= 2015–16 CB Gran Canaria season =

Herbalife Gran Canaria
2015–16 season
- Chairman: Miguel Ángel Betancor
- Head coach: Aíto García Reneses
- Arena: Gran Canaria Arena
- Liga ACB: 5th
- Playoffs: Quarterfinalists
- Copa del Rey: Runners-up
- Supercopa de España: Semifinalists
- Eurocup: Semifinalists
- PIR leader: (Slovenia) Alen Omić 16.50
- Scoring leader: (Slovenia) Alen Omić 12.45
- Rebounding leader: (Slovenia) Alen Omić 7.00
- Assists leader: (Canada) Kevin Pangos 4.64
- Highest home attendance: 9,097
- Lowest home attendance: 2,053
- Average home attendance: 5,543
Home	Away

The 2015–16 season was Herbalife Gran Canaria's 54th in existence and the club's 21st consecutive season in the top flight of Spanish basketball. Gran Canaria was involved in four competitions.

== Players ==
=== Squad information ===
Herbalife Gran Canaria roster
Players
Coaches

Pos.	No.	Nat.	Name	Ht.	Wt.	Age
PF	34	(Spain)	Aguilar, Pablo	2.05 m (6 ft 9 in)	107 kg (236 lb)	37 – 2 September 1989
F	13	(Dominican Republic)	Báez, Eulis (C)	2.01 m (6 ft 7 in)	95 kg (209 lb)	44 – 18 March 1982
SF	24	(United States)	Kuric, Kyle	1.93 m (6 ft 4 in)	88 kg (194 lb)	37 – 25 August 1989
SF	8	(Australia)	Newley, Brad	1.99 m (6 ft 6 in)	93 kg (205 lb)	41 – 18 February 1985
G	4	(Spain)	Oliver, Albert	1.87 m (6 ft 2 in)	84 kg (185 lb)	48 – 4 June 1978
C	23	(Slovenia)	Omić, Alen	2.16 m (7 ft 1 in)	102 kg (225 lb)	34 – 6 May 1992
PG	3	(Canada)	Pangos, Kevin	1.88 m (6 ft 2 in)	82 kg (181 lb)	33 – 26 January 1993
PF	14	(Latvia)	Pasečņiks, Anžejs	2.15 m (7 ft 1 in)	100 kg (220 lb)	30 – 20 December 1995
SF	21	(Spain)	Paulí, Oriol	2.01 m (6 ft 7 in)	84 kg (185 lb)	32 – 20 May 1994
G/F	22	(Spain)	Rabaseda, Xavi	1.96 m (6 ft 5 in)	93 kg (205 lb)	37 – 24 February 1989
G	9	(Finland)	Salin, Sasu	1.92 m (6 ft 4 in)	86 kg (190 lb)	35 – 11 June 1991
F/C	7	(Senegal)	Savané, Sitapha	2.01 m (6 ft 7 in)	103 kg (227 lb)	48 – 20 August 1978
SG	11	(United States)	Seeley, D. J.	1.93 m (6 ft 4 in)	88 kg (194 lb)	36 – 28 November 1989

Head coach

- (Spain) Aíto García Reneses

Assistant coach(es)

- (Spain) Israel González
- (Spain) Víctor García

Legend

- (C) Team captain
- Injured

- Roster

=== Players in ===
No.	Pos.	Nat.	Name	Age	Moving from		Type	Ends	Transfer fee	Date	Source
34	PF	(Spain)	Pablo Aguilar	26	Valencia Basket	(Spain)	Expired contract	2 years	Free	July 7, 2015	
22	G/F	(Spain)	Xavi Rabaseda	26	Movistar Estudiantes	(Spain)	Expired contract	2 years	Free	July 22, 2015	
3	PG	(Canada)	Kevin Pangos	22	Gonzaga	(United States)	End of NCAA eligibility	2 years	Free	July 24, 2015	
7	F/C	(Senegal)	Sitapha Savané	36	FIATC Joventut	(Spain)	Expired contract	1 year	Free	July 31, 2015	
23	C	(Slovenia)	Alen Omić	23	Union Olimpija	(Slovenia)	Expired contract	2 years	Free	August 1, 2015	
14	C	(Latvia)	Anžejs Pasečņiks	19	VEF Rīga	(Latvia)	Expired contract	1 year	Free	August 13, 2015	
44	C	(Lithuania)	Ovidijus Galdikas	26	Asseco Gdynia	(Poland)	Expired contract	1 year	Free	August 29, 2015	
11	SG	(United States)	D. J. Seeley	26	Beşiktaş	(Turkey)	Transfer	1 year	Free	December 2, 2015	

Total spending: ▼€0

=== Players out ===
No.	Pos.	Nat.	Name	Age	Moving to		Type	Transfer fee	Date	Source
22	C	(Cape Verde)	Walter Tavares	23	Atlanta Hawks	(United States)	Expired contract	Free	July 2, 2015	
11	PG	(Spain)	Tomás Bellas	28	CAI Zaragoza	(Spain)	Expired contract	Free	July 16, 2015	
3	PG	(Italy)	Luca Vitali	28	Vanoli Cremona	(Italy)	Expired contract	Free	July 16, 2015	
25	PF	(United States)	Ian O'Leary	28	Iberostar Tenerife	(Spain)	Expired contract	Free	August 4, 2015	
17	PG	(Spain)	Fabio Santana	23	Sáenz Horeca Araberri	(Spain)	Expired contract	Free	August 7, 2015	
12	C	(Australia)	Aleks Marić	30	Budućnost VOLI	(Montenegro)	Expired contract	Free	September 3, 2015	
10	SG	(Spain)	Txemi Urtasun	31	RETAbet.es GBC	(Spain)	Termination of contract	–	September 7, 2015	
44	C	(Lithuania)	Ovidijus Galdikas	27	King Wilki Morskie Szczecin	(Poland)	Loan	Free	February 19, 2016	
14	F/C	(Republic of Ireland)	Levon Kendall	31	Movistar Estudiantes	(Spain)	Expired contract	Free	April 25, 2016	

Total income: ▲€0

Total expenditure: €0

== Club ==
=== Technical staff ===
Position	Staff
Head coach	Aíto García Reneses
Assistant coach	Israel González; Víctor García

Source: ACB

=== Kit ===
Supplier: Spalding / Sponsor: Herbalife

Home	Away

== Pre-season and friendlies ==
Win Loss

11 September 2015 1	Herbalife Gran Canaria	90–67	Movistar Estudiantes	Vilagarcía de Arousa
	Scoring by quarter: 30–25, 21–21, 21–12, 18–9
	Pts: Kuric 18; Rebs: Galdikas 5 Asts: Pangos 5 PIR: Pangos 24	Boxscore	Pts: Hernangómez 16; Rebs: Hernangómez 11; Asts: Salgado 6 PIR: Hernangómez 28	Arena: Pabellón Fontecarmoa; Attendance: 800; Referees: Cortés, Pérez Pérez, Rial

13 September 2015 2	Rio Natura Monbus Obradoiro	46–74	Herbalife Gran Canaria	Vilagarcía de Arousa
	Scoring by quarter: 11–22, 14–14, 7–24, 14–14
	Pts: Caloiaro, Haws 11; Rebs: Caloiaro 15; Asts: McGrath 3 PIR: Caloiaro 28	Boxscore	Pts: Kuric 14; Rebs: Galdikas 9 Asts: Portugués 4 PIR: Kuric 16	Arena: Pabellón Fontecarmoa; Attendance: 1,000; Referees: Rial, Pérez Pérez, Cortés

20 September 2015 3	Herbalife Gran Canaria	51–66	ratiopharm Ulm	Las Palmas
	Scoring by quarter: 9–16, 10–12, 13–21, 19–17
	Pts: Galdikas 13; Rebs: Galdikas 7 Asts: Oliver 3 PIR: Galdikas 18	Boxscore	Pts: Kane 16; Rebs: Neumann 6 Asts: Günther 4 PIR: Kane 17	Arena: Gran Canaria Arena; Attendance: 3,574; Referees: Serrano, Araña, Pérez Niz

26 September 2015 4	Valencia Basket	86–70	Herbalife Gran Canaria	Burgos
	Scoring by quarter: 25–13, 17–26, 21–18, 23–13
	Pts: Hamilton 18; Rebs: Hamilton 8 Asts: Van Rossom 7 PIR: Hamilton 21	Boxscore	Pts: Báez 14; Rebs: Omić 5 Asts: Oliver 8 PIR: Rabaseda 12	Arena: Coliseum de Burgos; Attendance: 800; Referees: Martínez, Martínez, Rial

27 September 2015 5	Rio Natura Monbus Obradoiro	77–82	Herbalife Gran Canaria	Burgos
	Scoring by quarter: 18–24, 25–26, 16–17, 18–15
	Pts: Yusta 19; Rebs: Brown 7 Asts: McGrath 7 PIR: Yusta 20	Boxscore	Pts: Aguilar 11; Rebs: Omić 5 Asts: Báez, Savané 3 PIR: Savané 16	Arena: Coliseum de Burgos; Referees: Martínez, Sacristán, Rial

== Competitions ==
=== Overall ===
Competition	Started round	Final position / round	First match	Last match
Liga ACB	Matchday 1	5th	10 October 2015	22 May 2016
ACB Playoffs	Quarterfinals	Quarterfinalists	27 May 2016	31 May 2016
Copa del Rey	Quarterfinals	Runners-up	18 February 2016	21 February 2016
Supercopa de España	Semifinals	Semifinalists	2 October 2015	
Eurocup	Regular season	Semifinalists	13 October 2015	6 April 2016

Updated to match played May 31, 2016
Source: Competitions

=== Overview ===
Competition	Record							
Competition	Pld	W	D	L	PF	PA	PD	Win %
Liga ACB	34	21	0	13	2,818	2,705	+113	61.76
ACB Playoffs	3	1	0	2	240	246	−6	33.33
Copa del Rey	3	2	0	1	245	234	+11	66.67
Supercopa de España	1	0	0	1	60	88	−28	0.00
Eurocup	22	16	0	6	1,874	1,673	+201	72.73
Total	63	40	0	23	5,237	4,946	+291	63.49

Last updated: May 31, 2016
Source: Competitions

=== Supercopa de España ===
Win Loss

2 October 2015 Semifinals	Herbalife Gran Canaria	60–88	FC Barcelona Lassa	Málaga
19:00 (CEST)	Scoring by quarter: 13–16, 19–25, 15–30, 13–17
	Pts: Pangos 13; Rebs: four players 4 Asts: Pangos 6 PIR: Savané 14	Boxscore	Pts: Eriksson 16; Rebs: three players 5 Asts: Satoranský 8 PIR: Eriksson 19	Arena: Martín Carpena; Attendance: 0 Referees: García González, Conde, Peruga

=== Liga ACB ===
==== League table ====
Pos	Team	Pld	W	L	PF	PA	PD	Qualification or relegation
3	Valencia Basket	34	28	6	2831	2501	+330	Qualification to playoffs
4	Laboral Kutxa Baskonia	34	24	10	2987	2703	+284	Qualification to playoffs
5	Herbalife Gran Canaria	34	21	13	2818	2705	+113	Qualification to playoffs
6	Unicaja	34	20	14	2637	2508	+129	Qualification to playoffs
7	UCAM Murcia	34	18	16	2683	2663	+20	Qualification to playoffs

Source: ACB

==== Results summary ====
Overall						Home					Away				
Pld	W	L	PF	PA	PD	W	L	PF	PA	PD	W	L	PF	PA	PD
34	21	13	2818	2705	+113	14	3	1512	1342	+170	7	10	1306	1363	−57

Last updated: May 22, 2016.
Source: Competitive matches

==== Results by round ====
Round	1	2	3	4	5	6	7	8	9	10	11	12	13	14	15	16	17	18	19	20	21	22	23	24	25	26	27	28	29	30	31	32	33	34
Ground	H	A	H	A	H	A	H	A	H	A	A	H	A	A	H	H	A	H	A	H	A	H	H	A	H	A	H	A	H	A	H	A	H	A
Result	W	W	W	L	W	L	W	L	W	L	W	W	L	L	W	L	W	W	W	W	W	L	W	L	W	W	W	W	W	L	W	L	W	L
Position	2	1	1	5	3	6	5	5	5	5	5	5	5	5	5	5	5	5	5	5	5	5	5	5	5	5	5	5	5	5	5	5	5	5

Updated to match(es) played on May 22, 2016. Source: Competitive matches
A = Away; H = Home; W = Win; D = Draw; L = Loss

==== Matches ====
Win Loss

10 October 2015 1	Herbalife Gran Canaria	97–64	RETAbet.es GBC	Las Palmas
19:00 (CEST)	Scoring by quarter: 25–16, 25–15, 18–12, 29–21
	Pts: Kuric 23; Rebs: Omić 13; Asts: Pangos 5 PIR: Kuric 26	Boxscore	Pts: Lawrence 16; Rebs: Vrkić 7 Asts: Llompart 3 PIR: Urtasun 14	Arena: Gran Canaria Arena; Attendance: 6,187; Referees: Bulto, García Ortiz, Mas

18 October 2015 2	Dominion Bilbao Basket	59–85	Herbalife Gran Canaria	Bilbao
13:00 (CEST)	Scoring by quarter: 14–13, 19–23, 16–21, 10–28
	Pts: James 10; Rebs: James 8 Asts: Hervelle, López 3 PIR: James 16	Boxscore	Pts: Oliver 17; Rebs: Omić 12; Asts: Oliver 4 PIR: Báez, Omić 18	Arena: Bilbao Arena; Attendance: 8,106; Referees: Jiménez Trujillo, Calatrava, Caballero

25 October 2015 3	Herbalife Gran Canaria	76–67	Baloncesto Sevilla	Las Palmas
13:00 (CET)	Scoring by quarter: 19–8, 25–22, 13–21, 19–16
	Pts: Salin 14; Rebs: Báez 6 Asts: Oliver 4 PIR: Newley, Salin 15	Boxscore	Pts: Bamforth 12; Rebs: Balvin 10; Asts: Bamforth, Miljenović 3 PIR: Slokar 12	Arena: Gran Canaria Arena; Attendance: 7,624; Referees: Cortés, Castillo, Cardús

1 November 2015 4	Laboral Kutxa Baskonia	77–67	Herbalife Gran Canaria	Vitoria-Gasteiz
13:00 (CET)	Scoring by quarter: 20–19, 18–17, 21–19, 18–12
	Pts: Causeur 16; Rebs: Kangur 7 Asts: James 4 PIR: Bourousis 23	Boxscore	Pts: Pangos 16; Rebs: Omić 8 Asts: Oliver 5 PIR: Pangos 16	Arena: Fernando Buesa Arena; Attendance: 9,026; Referees: Conde, Perea, Aliaga

8 November 2015 5	Herbalife Gran Canaria	88–59	ICL Manresa	Las Palmas
13:00 (CET)	Scoring by quarter: 25–14, 15–11, 28–18, 20–16
	Pts: Oliver 13; Rebs: Omić 8 Asts: Pangos 9 PIR: Omić 18	Boxscore	Pts: Simon 16; Rebs: Musli 9 Asts: three players 2 PIR: Musli 12	Arena: Gran Canaria Arena; Attendance: 6,488; Referees: Peruga, Sanchez Mohedas, Sacristán

15 November 2015 6	Iberostar Tenerife	65–63	Herbalife Gran Canaria	San Cristóbal de La Laguna
19:30 (CET)	Scoring by quarter: 12–15, 17–19, 21–19, 15–10
	Pts: Richotti 15; Rebs: Abromaitis 8 Asts: four players 3 PIR: Beirán 22	Boxscore	Pts: Omić 15; Rebs: Omić 9 Asts: three players 2 PIR: Omić 24	Arena: Santiago Martín; Attendance: 3,976; Referees: Pérez Pérez, Guirao, Munar

22 November 2015 7	Herbalife Gran Canaria	91–79(OT)	CAI Zaragoza	Las Palmas
13:00 (CET)	Scoring by quarter: 16–13, 17–20, 15–21, 26–20, Overtime: 17–5
	Pts: Salin 16; Rebs: Galdikas, Omić 6 Asts: Pangos 9 PIR: Salin 24	Boxscore	Pts: Jelovac 19; Rebs: Jelovac 8 Asts: Bellas 4 PIR: Bellas 21	Arena: Gran Canaria Arena; Attendance: 6,736; Referees: Hierrezuelo, Araña, Rial

29 November 2015 8	Valencia Basket	86–61	Herbalife Gran Canaria	Valencia
19:30 (CET)	Scoring by quarter: 23–17, 22–20, 26–10, 15–14
	Pts: Hamilton 16; Rebs: Sikma, Vives 7 Asts: Diot 3 PIR: Hamilton 23	Boxscore	Pts: Pangos 15; Rebs: Omić, Paulí 6 Asts: Oliver 4 PIR: Omić 14	Arena: Fuente de San Luis; Attendance: 8,500; Referees: García González, Oyón, Fernández

6 December 2015 9	Herbalife Gran Canaria	88–75	Rio Natura Monbus Obradoiro	Las Palmas
13:00 (CET)	Scoring by quarter: 17–18, 31–23, 23–10, 17–24
	Pts: Omić 17; Rebs: Omić 9 Asts: Oliver 7 PIR: Pangos 26	Boxscore	Pts: Waczyński 24; Rebs: Caloiaro 9 Asts: McGrath 7 PIR: Waczyński 24	Arena: Gran Canaria Arena; Attendance: 6,468; Referees: Martín Bertrán, Pérez Niz, Martínez Díez

13 December 2015 10	Real Madrid	85–68	Herbalife Gran Canaria	Madrid
19:30 (CET)	Scoring by quarter: 23–20, 16–17, 23–14, 23–17
	Pts: Taylor 17; Rebs: Ayón 11; Asts: Rodríguez 8 PIR: Ayón 19	Boxscore	Pts: Pangos 11; Rebs: Aguilar 5 Asts: Pangos 4 PIR: Pangos 16	Arena: Barclaycard Center; Attendance: 8,015; Referees: Bultó, Sánchez Monserrat, Sacristán

20 December 2015 11	UCAM Murcia	71–75	Herbalife Gran Canaria	Murcia
13:00 (CET)	Scoring by quarter: 22–19, 12–8, 21–28, 16–20
	Pts: Benite, Lishchuk 13; Rebs: Lima, Lishchuk 6 Asts: Campazzo 4 PIR: Lishchuk 18	Boxscore	Pts: three players 11; Rebs: Omić 8 Asts: Pangos 3 PIR: Aguilar 13	Arena: Palacio de Deportes; Attendance: 5,876; Referees: Pérez Pizarro, Castillo, Serrano

22 December 2015 12	Herbalife Gran Canaria	98–65	Unicaja	Las Palmas
21:30 (CET)	Scoring by quarter: 24–23, 35–11, 23–16, 16–15
	Pts: Pangos 17; Rebs: Savané 5 Asts: Oliver 7 PIR: Báez, Newley 15	Boxscore	Pts: Kuzminskas 12; Rebs: Kuzminskas 6 Asts: Nedović 4 PIR: Kuzminskas 11	Arena: Gran Canaria Arena; Attendance: 6,928; Referees: Conde, Perea, Cardús

27 December 2015 13	MoraBanc Andorra	84–77(OT)	Herbalife Gran Canaria	Andorra la Vella
13:00 (CET)	Scoring by quarter: 19–17, 18–15, 16–18, 21–24, Overtime: 10–3
	Pts: Shermadini 17; Rebs: Bogdanović 9 Asts: Schreiner 6 PIR: Bogdanović 18	Boxscore	Pts: Báez 14; Rebs: Omić 7 Asts: Pangos 8 PIR: Báez 17	Arena: Poliesportiu d'Andorra; Attendance: 3,915; Referees: Cortés, Araña, Zamorano

3 January 2016 14	Montakit Fuenlabrada	92–72	Herbalife Gran Canaria	Fuenlabrada
13:00 (CET)	Scoring by quarter: 25–18, 16–23, 21–17, 30–14
	Pts: Popović 21; Rebs: Scott, Tabu 5 Asts: Tabu 9 PIR: Popović 26	Boxscore	Pts: Pangos 16; Rebs: Omić 7 Asts: Newley, Seeley 3 PIR: Báez 11	Arena: Fernando Martín; Attendance: 5,213; Referees: García González, Martínez, Sacristán

10 January 2016 15	Herbalife Gran Canaria	82–67	FIATC Joventut	Las Palmas
13:00 (CET)	Scoring by quarter: 26–18, 18–15, 26–12, 12–22
	Pts: Omić 18; Rebs: Omić 8 Asts: Oliver 9 PIR: Omić 30	Boxscore	Pts: Drame 15; Rebs: Llovet 7 Asts: Vidal 4 PIR: Drame 18	Arena: Gran Canaria Arena; Attendance: 6,764; Referees: Pérez Pizarro, Manuel, Munar

17 January 2016 16	Herbalife Gran Canaria	81–96	FC Barcelona Lassa	Las Palmas
20:30 (CET)	Scoring by quarter: 17–23, 24–34, 12–28, 28–11
	Pts: Omić 23; Rebs: Omić 6 Asts: Oliver 4 PIR: Omić 32	Boxscore	Pts: three players 16; Rebs: Lawal 9 Asts: Ribas 9 PIR: Satoranský 22	Arena: Gran Canaria Arena; Attendance: 8,696; Referees: Arteaga, Guirao, Fernández

24 January 2016 17	Movistar Estudiantes	70–87	Herbalife Gran Canaria	Madrid
18:30 (CET)	Scoring by quarter: 19–27, 12–15, 18–24, 21–21
	Pts: Laprovíttola 18; Rebs: Hernangómez 7 Asts: Fernández 3 PIR: Laprovíttola 15	Boxscore	Pts: Seeley 16; Rebs: Omić 11; Asts: Oliver 6 PIR: Omić 24	Arena: Barclaycard Center; Attendance: 9,867; Referees: Hierrezuelo, Bultó, Cardús

31 January 2016 18	Herbalife Gran Canaria	90–80	Iberostar Tenerife	Las Palmas
13:00 (CET)	Scoring by quarter: 30–23, 21–24, 21–20, 18–13
	Pts: Oliver 18; Rebs: Omić 9 Asts: Báez 4 PIR: Báez, Oliver 22	Boxscore	Pts: Arco 19; Rebs: Sekulić 7 Asts: San Miguel 6 PIR: Arco 19	Arena: Gran Canaria Arena; Attendance: 7,652; Referees: García González, Calatrava, Más

7 February 2016 19	ICL Manresa	70–78	Herbalife Gran Canaria	Manresa
19:00 (CET)	Scoring by quarter: 21–14, 12–18, 19–19, 18–27
	Pts: Otverchenko 22; Rebs: Musli 9 Asts: Hernández 5 PIR: Musli 29	Boxscore	Pts: Seeley 21; Rebs: Aguilar 7 Asts: Oliver 7 PIR: Seeley 31	Arena: Nou Congost; Attendance: 4,480; Referees: Pérez Pizarro, Cortés, Zamorano

14 February 2016 20	Herbalife Gran Canaria	91–85	Dominion Bilbao Basket	Las Palmas
19:30 (CET)	Scoring by quarter: 27–26, 22–21, 20–20, 22–18
	Pts: Omić 20; Rebs: Aguilar 6 Asts: Oliver 5 PIR: Omić 20	Boxscore	Pts: Hannah 23; Rebs: Bogris 8 Asts: Hannah 7 PIR: Hannah 29	Arena: Gran Canaria Arena; Attendance: 6,043; Referees: Perea, Oyón, Planells

28 February 2016 21	RETAbet.es GBC	79–87	Herbalife Gran Canaria	San Sebastián
18:00 (CET)	Scoring by quarter: 24–24, 19–25, 20–23, 16–15
	Pts: Llompart 18; Rebs: Grimau 5 Asts: Llompart 6 PIR: Llompart 15	Boxscore	Pts: Oliver 20; Rebs: three players 4 Asts: Salin 3 PIR: Oliver 21	Arena: San Sebastián Arena; Attendance: 4,281; Referees: Peruga, Manuel, Martínez Díez

6 March 2016 22	Herbalife Gran Canaria	93–103	Real Madrid	Las Palmas
12:30 (CET)	Scoring by quarter: 24–26, 34–29, 10–24, 25–24
	Pts: Oliver 18; Rebs: Omić 9 Asts: Oliver 6 PIR: Omić 27	Boxscore	Pts: Ayón 21; Rebs: Mačiulis 7 Asts: Rodríguez 9 PIR: Ayón 33	Arena: Gran Canaria Arena; Attendance: 9,097; Referees: Pérez Pérez, Calatrava, Sanchez Mohedas

13 March 2016 23	Herbalife Gran Canaria	87–75	UCAM Murcia	Las Palmas
13:00 (CET)	Scoring by quarter: 15–24, 32–14, 16–21, 24–16
	Pts: Seeley 15; Rebs: Báez 8 Asts: Pangos 7 PIR: Omić, Seeley 16	Boxscore	Pts: Campazzo 20; Rebs: Faverani 7 Asts: Campazzo 7 PIR: Campazzo 21	Arena: Gran Canaria Arena; Attendance: 5,922; Referees: Jiménez Trujillo, Sánchez Monserrat, Aliaga

19 March 2016 24	Baloncesto Sevilla	97–72	Herbalife Gran Canaria	Sevilla
19:00 (CET)	Scoring by quarter: 30–14, 19–9, 24–17, 24–32
	Pts: Nachbar 23; Rebs: Balvin 10; Asts: Håkanson, Rodríguez 5 PIR: Nachbar 28	Boxscore	Pts: Omić 16; Rebs: Omić 8 Asts: Oliver 4 PIR: Omić 23	Arena: San Pablo; Attendance: 4,007; Referees: Hierrezuelo, Pérez Niz, Martín Caballero

27 March 2016 25	Herbalife Gran Canaria	93–90	Laboral Kutxa Baskonia	Las Palmas
12:30 (CEST)	Scoring by quarter: 26–26, 15–22, 26–18, 26–24
	Pts: Omić, Salin 16; Rebs: Omić 7 Asts: Pangos 9 PIR: Pangos 24	Boxscore	Pts: James 21; Rebs: Bourousis 11; Asts: three players 2 PIR: Bourousis 23	Arena: Gran Canaria Arena; Attendance: 5,904; Referees: Martín Bertrán, Peruga, Munar

2 April 2016 26	Rio Natura Monbus Obradoiro	68–80	Herbalife Gran Canaria	Santiago de Compostela
20:00 (CEST)	Scoring by quarter: 17–15, 9–24, 25–20, 17–21
	Pts: Caloiaro 14; Rebs: Caloiaro 8 Asts: McGrath 6 PIR: Caloiaro 19	Boxscore	Pts: Salin 15; Rebs: Aguilar, Oliver 7 Asts: Oliver 5 PIR: Báez 17	Arena: Multiusos Fontes do Sar; Attendance: 5,113; Referees: Conde, García Ortiz, Mas Cagide

10 April 2016 27	Herbalife Gran Canaria	68–84	Valencia Basket	Las Palmas
19:30 (CEST)	Scoring by quarter: 19–16, 23–21, 16–27, 10–20
	Pts: Aguilar 13; Rebs: Omić 8 Asts: Oliver 5 PIR: Seeley 17	Boxscore	Pts: Dubljević 16; Rebs: Dubljević 12; Asts: Diot 5 PIR: Dubljević 24	Arena: Gran Canaria Arena; Attendance: 6,612; Referees: Pérez Pizarro, Martínez, Martínez Díez

17 April 2016 28	CAI Zaragoza	87–96	Herbalife Gran Canaria	Zaragoza
12:30 (CEST)	Scoring by quarter: 21–27, 20–20, 22–22, 24–27
	Pts: Benzing 20; Rebs: three players 6 Asts: Bellas 7 PIR: Jelovac 20	Boxscore	Pts: Oliver 20; Rebs: Aguilar 6 Asts: Oliver 5 PIR: Oliver 26	Arena: Pabellón Príncipe Felipe; Attendance: 7,221; Referees: Jiménez, Manuel, Caballero

24 April 2016 29	Herbalife Gran Canaria	98–85	MoraBanc Andorra	Las Palmas
12:00 (CEST)	Scoring by quarter: 22–18, 23–16, 22–18, 31–33
	Pts: Omić 18; Rebs: Aguilar 6 Asts: Pangos 11; PIR: Aguilar 22	Boxscore	Pts: Shermadini 21; Rebs: Navarro 5 Asts: Shermadini 8 PIR: Shermadini 34	Arena: Gran Canaria Arena; Attendance: 6,712; Referees: Arteaga, Castillo, Cardús

1 May 2016 30	Unicaja	92–87	Herbalife Gran Canaria	Málaga
19:30 (CEST)	Scoring by quarter: 25–21, 26–20, 16–21, 25–25
	Pts: Hayes 28; Rebs: Thomas 8 Asts: Jackson, Nedović 3 PIR: Thomas 25	Boxscore	Pts: Salin 20; Rebs: Omić 6 Asts: Oliver 7 PIR: Omić 22	Arena: Martín Carpena; Attendance: 7,000; Referees: García González, Oyón, Aliaga

8 May 2016 31	Herbalife Gran Canaria	82–80	Movistar Estudiantes	Las Palmas
12:30 (CEST)	Scoring by quarter: 24–11, 15–15, 18–27, 25–27
	Pts: Báez 15; Rebs: Omić 10; Asts: Pangos 7 PIR: Omić 21	Boxscore	Pts: Salgado 19; Rebs: Hernangómez, Simpson 6 Asts: Salgado 8 PIR: Salgado 25	Arena: Gran Canaria Arena; Attendance: 6,341; Referees: Perea, Martínez, Planells

11 May 2016 32	FC Barcelona Lassa	85–75	Herbalife Gran Canaria	Barcelona
20:30 (CEST)	Scoring by quarter: 27–18, 16–26, 22–17, 20–14
	Pts: Abrines, Navarro 16; Rebs: Lawal, Samuels 5 Asts: three players 3 PIR: Abrines, Navarro 19	Boxscore	Pts: Seeley 20; Rebs: Báez, Omić 8 Asts: Pangos 4 PIR: Omić 22	Arena: Palau Blaugrana; Attendance: 3,879; Referees: Hierrezuelo, García Ortiz, Sacristán

15 May 2016 33	Herbalife Gran Canaria	109–88	Montakit Fuenlabrada	Las Palmas
12:30 (CEST)	Scoring by quarter: 28–26, 32–15, 19–23, 30–24
	Pts: Pangos 25; Rebs: Savané 8 Asts: Oliver 5 PIR: Pangos 25	Boxscore	Pts: Popović 28; Rebs: Wear 6 Asts: Popović, Stević 3 PIR: Popović 23	Arena: Gran Canaria Arena; Attendance: 4,859; Referees: Martín Bertrán, Castillo, Fernández

22 May 2016 34	FIATC Joventut	96–76	Herbalife Gran Canaria	Badalona
12:30 (CEST)	Scoring by quarter: 26–27, 20–17, 35–19, 15–13
	Pts: Mallet 23; Rebs: three players 8 Asts: Sàbat, Vidal 5 PIR: Vidal 36	Boxscore	Pts: Kuric 13; Rebs: Pasečņiks 8 Asts: Pangos 6 PIR: Pangos 17	Arena: Palau Municipal d'Esports; Attendance: 3,733; Referees: Pérez Pérez, Sánchez Monserrat, Munar

==== Results overview ====
Win Draw Loss

Opposition	Home score	Away score	Double
Baloncesto Sevilla	76–67	97–72	148–164
CAI Zaragoza	91–79	87–96	187–166
Dominion Bilbao Basket	91–85	59–85	176–144
FC Barcelona Lassa	81–96	85–75	156–181
FIATC Joventut	82–67	96–76	158–163
Iberostar Tenerife	90–80	65–63	153–145
ICL Manresa	88–59	70–78	166–129
Laboral Kutxa Baskonia	93–90	77–67	160–167
Montakit Fuenlabrada	109–88	92–72	181–180
MoraBanc Andorra	98–85	84–77	175–169
Movistar Estudiantes	82–80	70–87	169–150
Real Madrid	93–103	85–68	161–188
RETAbet.es GBC	97–64	79–87	184–143
Rio Natura Monbus Obradoiro	88–75	68–80	168–143
UCAM Murcia	87–75	71–75	162–146
Unicaja	98–65	92–87	185–157
Valencia Basket	68–84	86–61	129–170

=== ACB Playoffs ===
Win Loss

==== Quarterfinals ====
27 May 2016 1st leg	Laboral Kutxa Baskonia	81–76	Herbalife Gran Canaria	Vitoria-Gasteiz
19:30 (CEST)	Scoring by quarter: 13–17, 18–15, 27–16, 23–28
	Pts: Adams 24; Rebs: Bourousis 12; Asts: Adams, James 4 PIR: Adams 23	Boxscore	Pts: Seeley 18; Rebs: Omić 7 Asts: three players 4 PIR: Seeley 22	Arena: Fernando Buesa Arena; Attendance: 9,634; Referees: Martín Bertrán, Peruga, Fernández

29 May 2016 2nd leg	Herbalife Gran Canaria	93–87	Laboral Kutxa Baskonia	Las Palmas
12:30 (WEST)	Scoring by quarter: 23–20, 26–17, 22–25, 22–25
	Pts: Oliver 13; Rebs: Aguilar 7 Asts: Pangos 6 PIR: Oliver 15	Boxscore	Pts: Adams 22; Rebs: Bourousis 9 Asts: Adams 7 PIR: Bourousis 28	Arena: Gran Canaria Arena; Attendance: 6,732; Referees: Pérez Pérez, Bultó, Oyón

31 May 2016 3rd leg	Laboral Kutxa Baskonia	78–71	Herbalife Gran Canaria	Vitoria-Gasteiz
20:30 (CEST)	Scoring by quarter: 18–20, 22–21, 21–13, 17–17
	Pts: Bourousis 17; Rebs: Bourousis 11; Asts: Adams, Bourousis 4 PIR: Bourousis 28	Boxscore	Pts: Báez, Pangos 13; Rebs: Omić 6 Asts: Pangos 5 PIR: Pangos 17	Arena: Fernando Buesa Arena; Attendance: 12,683; Referees: Conde, Jiménez, Cortés

=== Eurocup ===
==== Regular season ====
Pos	Team	Pld	W	L	PF	PA	PD	Qualification
1	(Spain) Herbalife Gran Canaria	10	8	2	839	752	+87	Advance to Last 32
2	(Germany) MHP Riesen Ludwigsburg	10	7	3	811	732	+79	Advance to Last 32
3	(Italy) Grissin Bon Reggio Emilia	10	6	4	778	759	+19	Advance to Last 32
4	(Germany) Alba Berlin	10	5	5	774	790	−16	Advance to Last 32
5	(France) Le Mans Sarthe	10	3	7	721	785	−64	
6	(Italy) Enel Basket Brindisi	10	1	9	710	815	−105	

Source: Eurocup Basketball

Win Loss

13 October 2015 1	Le Mans Sarthe (France)	74–79	(Spain) Herbalife Gran Canaria	Le Mans, France
21:00 (CEST)	Scoring by quarter: 24–22, 14–21, 16–19, 20–17
	Pts: Cornelie, McKee 17; Rebs: Cornelie 7 Asts: McKee 6 PIR: Cornelie 18	Boxscore	Pts: Kuric, Omić 11; Rebs: Omić 9 Asts: Pangos 5 PIR: Salin 16	Arena: Antarès; Attendance: 3,100; Referees: Saša Pukl (SLO), Spiros Gkontas (GRE), Miloš Koljenšić (MNE)

21 October 2015 2	Herbalife Gran Canaria (Spain)	95–75	(Germany) MHP Riesen Ludwigsburg	Las Palmas, Spain
21:00 (CEST)	Scoring by quarter: 23–15, 20–20, 24–20, 28–20
	Pts: Salin 17; Rebs: Newley, Omić 6 Asts: Aguilar 6 PIR: Salin, Aguilar 19	Boxscore	Pts: Shakur 18; Rebs: Brockman 9 Asts: three players 3 PIR: Trice 18	Arena: Gran Canaria Arena; Attendance: 2,547; Referees: Robert Vyklický (CZE), Tomas Jasevičius (LTU), Gentian Cici (ALB)

27 October 2015 3	Herbalife Gran Canaria (Spain)	103–76	(Italy) Enel Basket Brindisi	Las Palmas, Spain
21:15 (CET)	Scoring by quarter: 31–13, 19–22, 27–17, 26–24
	Pts: Salin 20; Rebs: Aguilar 10; Asts: Pangos 8 PIR: Pangos 21	Boxscore	Pts: Scott 20; Rebs: Milošević, Gagić 7 Asts: three players 2 PIR: Gagić 17	Arena: Gran Canaria Arena; Attendance: 2,053; Referees: Petros Papapetrou (GRE), Sérgio Silva (POR), Regis Bardera (FRA)

4 November 2015 4	Alba Berlin (Germany)	84–71	(Spain) Herbalife Gran Canaria	Berlin, Germany
20:00 (CET)	Scoring by quarter: 17–28, 18–19, 25–7, 24–17
	Pts: Kikanović 24; Rebs: Lončar 7 Asts: Taylor 5 PIR: Kikanović 26	Boxscore	Pts: Pangos 18; Rebs: Omić 9 Asts: Báez, Pangos 4 PIR: Omić 15	Arena: Mercedes-Benz Arena; Attendance: 7,944; Referees: Nicola Maestre (FRA), Tomasz Trawicki (POL), Markos Michaelides (SUI)

10 November 2015 5	Herbalife Gran Canaria (Spain)	76–67	(Italy) Grissin Bon Reggio Emilia	Las Palmas, Spain
21:00 (CET)	Scoring by quarter: 23–26, 13–10, 17–16, 23–15
	Pts: Omić 17; Rebs: Omić 10; Asts: Pangos 6 PIR: Omić 28	Boxscore	Pts: Aradori 12; Rebs: Polonara, Strautiņš 6 Asts: De Nicolao 6 PIR: Polonara 14	Arena: Gran Canaria Arena; Attendance: 3,807; Referees: Ilija Belošević (SRB), Elias Koromilas (GRE), Joseph Bissang (FRA)

17 November 2015 6	Herbalife Gran Canaria (Spain)	77–62	(France) Le Mans Sarthe	Las Palmas, Spain
21:00 (CET)	Scoring by quarter: 17–13, 12–19, 26–10, 22–20
	Pts: Omić 19; Rebs: Aguilar 9 Asts: Pangos 4 PIR: Omić 27	Boxscore	Pts: Lofton 23; Rebs: Yarou 13; Asts: Konaté, McKee 2 PIR: Lofton 22	Arena: Gran Canaria Arena; Attendance: 3,803; Referees: Christos Christodoulou, (GRE), Damir Javor (SLO), Petar Obradović (BIH)

25 November 2015 7	MHP Riesen Ludwigsburg (Germany)	92–89(OT)	(Spain) Herbalife Gran Canaria	Ludwigsburg, Germany
20:00 (CET)	Scoring by quarter: 21–20, 23–16, 11–19, 26–26, Overtime: 11–8
	Pts: Cotton 20; Rebs: Brockman 11; Asts: Shakur 5 PIR: Brockman 29	Boxscore	Pts: Pangos 31; Rebs: three players 5 Asts: Pangos 6 PIR: Pangos 38	Arena: MHP Arena; Attendance: 3,075; Referees: Ioannis Foufis (GRE), Saverio Lanzarini (ITA), Igor Dragojević (MNE)

2 December 2015 8	Enel Basket Brindisi (Italy)	71–88	(Spain) Herbalife Gran Canaria	Brindisi, Italy
20:45 (CET)	Scoring by quarter: 12–25, 21–21, 21–22, 17–20
	Pts: Harris 20; Rebs: Milošević, Zerini 7 Asts: Banks 4 PIR: Harris 23	Boxscore	Pts: Salin 21; Rebs: Omić 11; Asts: Báez 6 PIR: Báez 24	Arena: PalaPentassuglia; Attendance: 2,100; Referees: Siniša Herceg (CRO), Marko Juras (SRB), Jean-Charles Collin (FRA)

9 December 2015 9	Herbalife Gran Canaria (Spain)	83–78	(Germany) Alba Berlin	Las Palmas, Spain
21:00 (CET)	Scoring by quarter: 21–17, 18–21, 24–23, 20–17
	Pts: Pangos 23; Rebs: Omić 9 Asts: Pangos 5 PIR: Pangos 28	Boxscore	Pts: Kikanović, Milosavljević 15; Rebs: Kikanović 6 Asts: Taylor 4 PIR: Taylor 14	Arena: Gran Canaria Arena; Attendance: 3,723; Referees: Anastasios Piloidis (GRE), Aleksandar Glišić (SRB), Ilya Putenko (RUS)

16 December 2015 10	Grissin Bon Reggio Emilia (Italy)	73–78	(Spain) Herbalife Gran Canaria	Reggio Emilia, Italy
20:30 (CET)	Scoring by quarter: 22–16, 13–14, 21–26, 17–22
	Pts: Aradori, Lavrinovič 20; Rebs: Della Valle 6 Asts: De Nicolao 4 PIR: Lavrinovič 30	Boxscore	Pts: Pangos 15; Rebs: Omić 7 Asts: Pangos 7 PIR: Omić 15	Arena: PalaBigi; Attendance: 3,099; Referees: Milivoje Jovčić (SRB), Aare Halliko (EST), Gentian Cici (ALB)

==== Last 32 ====
Pos	Team	Pld	W	L	PF	PA	PD	Qualification
1	(Spain) Herbalife Gran Canaria	6	5	1	531	440	+91	Advance to Eighthfinals
2	(France) SIG Strasbourg	6	4	2	464	456	+8	Advance to Eighthfinals
3	(Russia) Avtodor Saratov	6	3	3	531	540	−9	
4	(Israel) Hapoel Jerusalem	6	0	6	455	545	−90	

Source: Eurocup Basketball

Win Loss

6 January 2016 1	Herbalife Gran Canaria (Spain)	76–85	(France) Strasbourg	Las Palmas, Spain
19:30 (CET)	Scoring by quarter: 21–26, 17–17, 15–25, 23–17
	Pts: Seeley 22; Rebs: Aguilar 10; Asts: Pangos 6 PIR: Seeley 17	Boxscore	Pts: Collins 21; Rebs: Collins 7 Asts: Collins 4 PIR: Collins 28	Arena: Gran Canaria Arena; Attendance: 3,935; Referees: Seffi Shemmesh (ISR), Uroš Obrknežević (SRB), Torkild Rødsand (NOR)

13 January 2016 2	Hapoel Jerusalem (Israel)	64–75	(Spain) Herbalife Gran Canaria	Jerusalem, Israel
19:55 (CET)	Scoring by quarter: 16–18, 13–28, 13–15, 22–14
	Pts: Halperin, Gaffney 14; Rebs: Eliyahu 9 Asts: Rowland 7 PIR: Halperin 21	Boxscore	Pts: Salin 20; Rebs: Aguilar, Omić 6 Asts: Oliver 5 PIR: Salin 21	Arena: Pais Arena Jerusalem; Attendance: 8,000; Referees: Saša Pukl (SLO), Milija Vojinović (SRB), Igor Mitrovski (MKD)

20 January 2016 3	Herbalife Gran Canaria (Spain)	101–77	(Russia) Avtodor Saratov	Las Palmas, Spain
21:00 (CET)	Scoring by quarter: 23–24, 27–20, 23–18, 28–15
	Pts: Omić 18; Rebs: Omić 9 Asts: Oliver 11; PIR: Omić 22	Boxscore	Pts: Chappell 14; Rebs: Brooks 9 Asts: Chappell 4 PIR: Brooks 21	Arena: Gran Canaria Arena; Attendance: 3,191; Referees: Christos Christodoulou (GRE), Sašo Petek (SLO), Tomislav Hordov (CRO)

27 January 2016 4	Avtodor Saratov (Russia)	85–92	(Spain) Herbalife Gran Canaria	Saratov, Russia
17:00 (CET)	Scoring by quarter: 12–26, 25–18, 28–20, 22–28
	Pts: Peterson 19; Rebs: Brooks 7 Asts: Stoll 5 PIR: Brooks, Peterson 21	Boxscore	Pts: Salin 19; Rebs: Omić 7 Asts: Oliver 10; PIR: Salin 19	Arena: Kristall Arena; Attendance: 2.500; Referees: Anastasios Piloïdis (GRE), Aleksandar Glišić (SRB), Moritz Reiter (GER)

3 February 2016 5	Strasbourg (France)	68–79	(Spain) Herbalife Gran Canaria	Strasbourg, France
20:45 (CET)	Scoring by quarter: 21–25, 15–15, 15–17, 17–22
	Pts: Leloup 20; Rebs: Howard 10; Asts: Collins 4 PIR: Leloup 26	Boxscore	Pts: Seeley 16; Rebs: Aguilar 6 Asts: Oliver 8 PIR: Seeley 20	Arena: Rhénus Sport; Attendance: 5,364; Referees: Robert Lottermoser (GER), Sérgio Silva (POR), Amit Balak (ISR)

10 February 2016 6	Herbalife Gran Canaria (Spain)	108–61	(Israel) Hapoel Jerusalem	Las Palmas, Spain
21:00 (CET)	Scoring by quarter: 31–12, 27–13, 25–21, 25–15
	Pts: Aguilar 19; Rebs: Omić 17; Asts: Oliver 8 PIR: Omić 37	Boxscore	Pts: Duncan 14; Rebs: Duncan 5 Asts: Rowland 5 PIR: Smith 13	Arena: Gran Canaria Arena; Attendance: 3,308; Referees: Borys Ryzhyk (UKR), Siniša Herceg (CRO), Mario Majkić (SLO)

==== Knockout stage ====
Win Draw Loss

===== Eighthfinals =====
24 February 2016 First leg	Limoges (France)	65–82	(Spain) Herbalife Gran Canaria	Limoges, France
20:40 (CET)	Scoring by quarter: 11–22, 18–15, 15–25, 21–20
	Pts: Boungou Colo, Westermann 13; Rebs: Boungou Colo 6 Asts: Westermann 6 PIR: Boungou Colo 20	Boxscore	Pts: Salin 18; Rebs: Omić 9 Asts: Pangos 6 PIR: Salin 17	Arena: Beaublanc; Attendance: 5,200; Referees: Fernando Rocha (POR), Petros Papapetrou (GRE), David Romano (ISR)

2 March 2016 Second leg	Herbalife Gran Canaria (Spain)	77–78	(France) Limoges	Las Palmas, Spain
21:00 (CET)	Scoring by quarter: 18–24, 24–18, 12–19, 23–17
	Pts: Omić 15; Rebs: Omić 7 Asts: Pangos 6 PIR: Omić 22	Boxscore	Pts: Traoré 19; Rebs: Daniels 7 Asts: Westermann 3 PIR: Traoré 19	Arena: Gran Canaria Arena; Attendance: 4,652; Referees: Tolga Sahin (ITA), Aare Halliko (EST), Ingus Baumanis (LAT)

===== Quarterfinals =====
16 March 2016 First leg	Stelmet Zielona Góra (Poland)	82–93	(Spain) Herbalife Gran Canaria	Zielona Góra, Poland
19:15 (CET)	Scoring by quarter: 20–23, 29–21, 16–23, 17–26
	Pts: Bost 20; Rebs: Moldoveanu, Bost 6 Asts: Bost 8 PIR: Bost 28	Boxscore	Pts: Omić 20; Rebs: Omić 8 Asts: Pangos 8 PIR: Omić 27	Arena: Centrum Rekreacyjno Sportowe; Attendance: 4,509; Referees: Ioannis Foufis (GRE), Sašo Petek (SLO), Igor Mitrovski (MKD)

23 March 2016 Second leg	Herbalife Gran Canaria (Spain)	83–86	(Poland) Stelmet Zielona Góra	Las Palmas, Spain
21:30 (CET)	Scoring by quarter: 24–18, 21–21, 25–19, 13–28
	Pts: Omić 14; Rebs: Rabaseda 6 Asts: Oliver 5 PIR: Omić 22	Boxscore	Pts: Koszarek, Moldoveanu 15; Rebs: Ponitka 7 Asts: Koszarek 7 PIR: Koszarek 20	Arena: Gran Canaria Arena; Attendance: 6,786; Referees: Seffi Shemmesh (ISR), Siniša Herceg (CRO), Saverio Lanzarini (ITA)

===== Semifinals =====
30 March 2016 First leg	Galatasaray Odeabank (Turkey)	89–75	(Spain) Herbalife Gran Canaria	Istanbul, Turkey
19:00 (CEST)	Scoring by quarter: 25–24, 24–18, 24–14, 16–19
	Pts: McCollum 18; Rebs: Davis, Schilb 10; Asts: Micov 6 PIR: Davis 29	Boxscore	Pts: Omić 15; Rebs: Omić 6 Asts: Oliver 5 PIR: Omić 20	Arena: Abdi İpekçi Arena; Attendance: 10,383; Referees: Borys Ryzhyk (UKR), Milija Vojinović (SRB), Miloš Koljenšić (MNE)

6 April 2016 Second leg	Herbalife Gran Canaria (Spain)	94–81(OT)	(Turkey) Galatasaray Odeabank	Las Palmas, Spain
21:30 (CEST)	Scoring by quarter: 27–29, 21–15, 19–13, 23–19, Overtime: 4–5
	Pts: Seeley 23; Rebs: Omić 7 Asts: Seeley, Báez 5 PIR: Seeley 28	Boxscore	Pts: Micov 21; Rebs: Micov 7 Asts: Schilb, Güler 2 PIR: McCollum 23	Arena: Gran Canaria Arena; Attendance: 7,908; Referees: Ilija Belošević (SRB), Tomas Jasevičius (LTU), Clemens Fritz (GER)

=== Copa del Rey ===
Win Loss

18 February 2016 Quarterfinals	Valencia Basket	78–83	Herbalife Gran Canaria	A Coruña
21:30 (CET)	Scoring by quarter: 26–16, 16–26, 23–15, 13–25
	Pts: San Emeterio 17; Rebs: Hamilton 10; Asts: Hamilton, Vives 3 PIR: San Emeterio 17	Boxscore	Pts: Aguilar 16; Rebs: Omić 9 Asts: Pangos 8 PIR: Aguilar 18	Arena: Coliseum; Attendance: 9,156; Referees: García González, Pérez Pérez, Cortés

20 February 2016 Semifinals	Dominion Bilbao Basket	71–81	Herbalife Gran Canaria	A Coruña
19:00 (CET)	Scoring by quarter: 22–15, 24–19, 9–14, 16–33
	Pts: Hannah 20; Rebs: Bogris 6 Asts: Bogris 3 PIR: Hannah 18	Boxscore	Pts: Oliver 18; Rebs: Báez 8 Asts: Oliver 4 PIR: Oliver 18	Arena: Coliseum; Attendance: 10,000; Referees: Conde, Jiménez, Calatrava

21 February 2016 Final	Herbalife Gran Canaria	81–85	Real Madrid	A Coruña
19:00 (CET)	Scoring by quarter: 18–24, 20-16, 21–22, 22–23
	Pts: Oliver 16; Rebs: Aguilar 8 Asts: Seeley, Pangos 4 PIR: Oliver 18	Boxscore	Pts: Ayón 15; Rebs: Nocioni 7 Asts: Rodríguez, Llull 5 PIR: Ayón 21	Arena: Coliseum; Attendance: 10,000; Referees: Martín Bertrán, García González, Cortés

== Statistics ==
Legend
GP	Games played	GS	Games started	MPG	Minutes per game
FG%	Field-goal percentage	3FG%	3-point field-goal percentage	FT%	Free-throw percentage
RPG	Rebounds per game	APG	Assists per game	SPG	Steals per game
BPG	Blocks per game	PPG	Points per game	PIR	PIR per game

=== Liga ACB ===
Player	GP	GS	MPG	FG%	3FG%	FT%	RPG	APG	SPG	BPG	PPG	EFF
Pablo Aguilar	30	2	18.0	.442	.363	.698	4.0	0.5	1.0	0.3	8.0	8.9
Eulis Báez	34	32	22.0	.415	.358	.768	4.3	1.2	1.0	0.2	7.7	9.7
Ovidijus Galdikas	5	3	5.0	.833	.000	.000	1.2	0.0	0.4	0.2	2.0	2.6
Kyle Kuric	10	4	16.0	.482	.375	1.000	2.1	0.3	1.0	0.1	7.9	8.6
Brad Newley	32	25	21.0	.456	.352	.712	2.7	1.4	0.8	0.1	8.3	7.8
Albert Oliver	34	10	20.0	.384	.292	.929	2.1	4.3	0.4	0.1	8.4	9.8
Alen Omić	32	25	24.0	.611	.000	.534	6.9	1.1	0.8	0.4	12.3	15.9
Kevin Pangos	30	24	23.0	.385	.373	.400	2.3	4.5	0.9	0.0	11.0	11.1
Anžejs Pasečņiks	18	2	9.0	.500	.200	.581	1.8	0.2	0.4	0.2	3.2	2.7
Oriol Paulí	27	1	11.0	.356	.172	.552	1.8	0.8	0.4	0.1	2.7	3.0
Xavi Rabaseda	33	7	15.0	.413	.237	.788	1.9	0.6	1.2	0.2	4.2	3.6
Sasu Salin	33	29	23.0	.379	.370	.975	2.2	1.2	0.8	0.1	8.8	6.9
Sitapha Savané	32	4	13.0	.583	.000	.781	2.5	0.5	0.5	0.6	5.5	6.9
D. J. Seeley	24	2	18.0	.458	.382	.927	1.9	1.4	1.1	0.2	9.0	9.1

Last updated: May 22, 2016.
Source: ACB

=== ACB Playoffs ===
Player	GP	GS	MPG	FG%	3FG%	FT%	RPG	APG	SPG	BPG	PPG	EFF
Pablo Aguilar	3	0	16.0	.375	.000	1.000	4.7	0.3	1.3	1.0	4.7	7.3
Eulis Báez	3	3	24.0	.480	.231	.727	4.3	0.7	0.3	0.0	11.7	12.7
Kyle Kuric	3	2	11.0	.545	.833	1.000	1.0	0.7	1.3	0.0	6.3	6.7
Brad Newley	3	3	19.0	.455	.375	.500	1.7	1.7	1.3	0.0	4.7	6.7
Albert Oliver	3	1	16.0	.261	.188	.923	1.3	3.0	1.0	0.0	9.0	6.3
Alen Omić	3	0	25.0	.440	.000	1.000	6.0	1.7	0.3	0.3	8.7	8.3
Kevin Pangos	3	2	24.0	.423	.467	.000	2.0	5.0	0.7	0.0	9.7	10.7
Anžejs Pasečņiks	3	3	4.0	.000	.000	1.000	1.3	0.0	0.7	0.7	0.7	2.0
Oriol Paulí	0	0	0.0	.000	.000	.000	0.0	0.0	0.0	0.0	0.0	0.0
Xavi Rabaseda	3	0	18.0	.636	.400	.571	1.7	0.3	2.0	0.3	6.7	6.0
Sasu Salin	2	1	20.0	.357	.300	.000	3.0	1.0	1.0	0.0	6.5	5.0
Sitapha Savané	3	0	10.0	.333	.000	1.000	3.0	0.0	0.3	0.3	3.7	3.0
D. J. Seeley	3	0	18.0	.571	.250	.666	1.7	2.0	0.3	0.0	10.0	11.7

Last updated: May 31, 2016.
Source: ACB

=== Copa del Rey ===
Player	GP	GS	MPG	FG%	3FG%	FT%	RPG	APG	SPG	BPG	PPG	EFF
Pablo Aguilar	3	0	17.0	.476	.250	.778	5.0	0.0	0.7	0.3	10.0	10.7
Eulis Báez	3	3	24.0	.364	.400	.833	6.0	0.3	0.7	0.3	8.3	10.7
Brad Newley	3	3	17.0	.333	.143	1.000	1.7	0.3	0.7	0.0	5.3	2.7
Albert Oliver	3	2	21.0	.52	.444	.900	2.0	3.7	0.0	0.0	13.0	14.0
Alen Omić	3	2	28.0	.615	.000	.786	5.7	0.7	1.0	0.3	9.0	14.0
Kevin Pangos	3	1	21.0	.200	.375	.929	3.0	4.3	0.3	0.0	7.3	11.0
Anžejs Pasečņiks	1	1	4.0	.500	.000	.000	1.0	0.0	0.0	0.0	2.0	0.0
Oriol Paulí	1	0	5.0	.000	.000	.000	0.0	0.0	0.0	0.0	0.0	0.0
Xavi Rabaseda	3	0	20.0	.563	.556	.571	3.3	0.3	0.7	0.0	9.0	10.0
Sasu Salin	3	3	21.0	.412	.308	1.000	0.7	1.0	0.7	0.0	7.3	4.7
Sitapha Savané	3	0	9.0	.250	.000	.333	0.3	0.0	0.0	1.0	2.0	0.0
D. J. Seeley	3	0	20.0	.526	.429	.750	1.0	1.3	1.3	0.3	9.7	8.0

Last updated: February 21, 2016.
Source: ACB

=== Supercopa de España ===
Player	GP	GS	MPG	FG%	3FG%	FT%	RPG	APG	SPG	BPG	PPG	EFF
Pablo Aguilar	1	0	14.0	.000	.000	.500	4.0	0.0	0.0	0.0	1.0	4.0
Eulis Báez	1	1	26.0	.200	.333	1.000	1.0	1.0	1.0	0.0	7.0	5.0
Kyle Kuric	1	0	13.0	.167	.000	.000	0.0	0.0	0.0	0.0	2.0	0.0
Brad Newley	1	0	15.0	.200	.000	.000	3.0	1.0	0.0	0.0	4.0	3.0
Albert Oliver	1	0	14.0	.000	.000	1.000	1.0	5.0	0.0	0.0	2.0	7.0
Alen Omić	1	0	19.0	.666	.000	.000	4.0	1.0	0.0	0.0	8.0	10.0
Kevin Pangos	1	1	27.0	.333	.500	1.000	4.0	6.0	2.0	0.0	13.0	12.0
Anžejs Pasečņiks	0	0	0.0	.000	.000	.000	0.0	0.0	0.0	0.0	0.0	0.0
Oriol Paulí	1	0	7.0	.000	.000	.000	4.0	0.0	0.0	0.0	0.0	3.0
Xavi Rabaseda	1	1	19.0	.000	.000	.500	2.0	2.0	1.0	1.0	1.0	5.0
Sasu Salin	1	1	24.0	.333	.286	.000	4.0	2.0	1.0	0.0	10.0	7.0
Sitapha Savané	1	1	21.0	.571	.000	1.000	2.0	3.0	1.0	0.0	12.0	14.0

Last updated: October 2, 2015.
Source: ACB

=== Eurocup ===
Player	GP	GS	MPG	FG%	3FG%	FT%	RPG	APG	SPG	BPG	PPG	EFF
Pablo Aguilar	20	3	18.24	.468	.420	.842	4.5	1.3	0.4	0.5	8.1	9.8
Eulis Báez	22	18	22.10	.406	.276	.760	3.8	2.0	0.6	0.2	7.2	9.4
Ovidijus Galdikas	5	4	9.39	.462	.000	.500	4.4	0.6	0.0	0.8	2.6	5.4
Kyle Kuric	3	3	24.09	.536	.545	.500	2.0	1.3	0.0	0.3	14.7	12.3
Brad Newley	22	17	22.34	.500	.333	.692	3.0	1.3	0.7	0.1	8.5	8.4
Albert Oliver	22	8	18.25	.283	.247	.871	2.0	4.4	0.4	0.0	5.4	5.3
Alen Omić	21	13	24.32	.633	.000	.639	7.6	1.4	0.4	0.2	14.0	19.2
Kevin Pangos	19	14	23.53	.436	.512	.756	1.6	4.8	0.3	0.0	11.9	12.1
Anžejs Pasečņiks	15	5	8.12	.629	.333	.636	1.8	0.1	0.2	0.2	3.5	3.0
Oriol Paulí	16	1	11.25	.419	.333	.421	2.1	1.3	0.3	0.2	3.1	3.6
Xavi Rabaseda	22	4	15.52	.471	.370	.800	1.7	1.2	0.8	0.2	5.7	5.4
Sasu Salin	22	17	22.27	.412	.384	.854	2.7	1.0	0.8	0.0	11.5	9.9
Sitapha Savané	18	1	13.02	.438	.000	.714	2.8	0.6	0.2	0.6	3.2	4.4
D. J. Seeley	12	2	18.12	.539	.500	.688	1.8	1.7	0.4	0.2	11.4	11.3

Last updated: April 6, 2016.
Source: Eurocup
