= 2018 Copa del Rey de Baloncesto =

Spanish basketball competition

Tournament details
- Arena: Gran Canaria Arena; Las Palmas
- Dates: 15–18 February 2018

Final positions
- Champions: FC Barcelona Lassa
- Runners-up: Real Madrid

Awards and statistics
- MVP: (France) Thomas Heurtel

The 2018 Copa del Rey de Baloncesto was the 82nd edition of the Spanish King's Basketball Cup, won by FC Barcelona Lassa against former 4-time reigning champions Real Madrid. The competition is managed by the ACB and was held in Las Palmas, in the Gran Canaria Arena in February 2018.

All times are in Western European Time (UTC±00:00).

== Qualified teams ==
The seven first qualified after the first half of the 2017–18 ACB regular season qualified to the tournament. As Herbalife Gran Canaria, host team, not finished between the seven first teams, the eighth qualified did not enter in the Copa del Rey.

Pos	Team	Pld	W	L	PF	PA	PD	Seeding
1	Real Madrid	17	16	1	1565	1346	+219	Qualified as seeded teams
2	Valencia Basket	17	12	5	1426	1295	+131	Qualified as seeded teams
3	FC Barcelona Lassa	17	11	6	1528	1385	+143	Qualified as seeded teams
4	Montakit Fuenlabrada	17	11	6	1311	1358	−47	Qualified as seeded teams
5	Unicaja	17	10	7	1376	1258	+118	
6	Baskonia	17	10	7	1412	1364	+48	
7	Iberostar Tenerife	17	10	7	1308	1271	+37	
9	Herbalife Gran Canaria (H)	17	9	8	1443	1426	+17	

Source: ACB
(H) Hosts

== Draw ==
The 2018 Copa del Rey de Baloncesto was drawn on 23 January 2018 at approximately 11:30 and was broadcast live on YouTube and on TV in many countries. The seeded teams were paired in the quarterfinals with the non-seeded teams. There were not any restrictions for the draw of the semifinals. As in recent seasons, the first qualified team plays its quarterfinal game on Thursday.

== Threat of strike ==
In the previous week of the Cup, the Basketball Players Association (ABP) called for a strike on 14 February, thus trying to stop the Cup if the ACB do not accept their requirements, in the negotiation of the new collective agreement, including the subsidy of €315,000 from the league to the players' trade union.

After the trade union's proposal, several clubs refused to follow the strike. However, many players are supporting the Players' Association by social networks. Finally, on 13 February, ACB and ABP agreed terms and the Cup would be played normally.

== Bracket ==
Quarterfinals
15 February
Valencia Basket	72
Iberostar Tenerife	79
15 February
Real Madrid	89
Unicaja	84
16 February
Herbalife Gran Canaria	107
Montakit Fuenlabrada	92
16 February
FC Barcelona Lassa	94
Baskonia	90

Semifinals
17 February
Iberostar Tenerife	59
Real Madrid	77
17 February
Herbalife Gran Canaria	74
FC Barcelona Lassa	87

Final
18 February
Real Madrid	90
FC Barcelona Lassa	92

== Quarterfinals ==
=== Valencia Basket vs. Iberostar Tenerife ===
15 February 2018	Valencia Basket	72–79	Iberostar Tenerife	Las Palmas
18:00	Scoring by quarter: 21–20, 15–16, 19–23, 17–20
	Pts: Green 14; Rebs: Pleiß 8 Asts: Doornekamp, Pleiß 3 PIR: Pleiß 24	Boxscore	Pts: Abromaitis 15; Rebs: Tobey, Vázquez 6 Asts: San Miguel 8 PIR: Vázquez 13	Arena: Gran Canaria Arena; Attendance: 8,324; Referees: Daniel Hierrezuelo, Miguel Ángel Pérez Pérez, Carlos Cortés

Starters:			Pts	Reb	Ast
F	00	(United States) Will Thomas	11	2	1
F	6	(Spain) Alberto Abalde	9	3	2
G	17	(Spain) Rafa Martínez	3	0	0
C	21	(Germany) Tibor Pleiß	13	8	3
F	42	(Canada) Aaron Doornekamp	5	7	3
Reserves:					
G	3	(Spain) Josep Puerto	DNP		
G	5	(Spain) Sergi García	0	0	1
C	14	(Montenegro) Bojan Dubljević	6	5	1
F	19	(Spain) Fernando San Emeterio	7	4	0
F	30	(Spain) Joan Sastre	4	2	1
G	32	(United States) Erick Green	14	1	0
C	51	(Iceland) Tryggvi Hlinason	DNP		
Head coach:
(Spanish Basketball Federation) Txus Vidorreta

Valencia Basket	Iberostar Tenerife

Starters:			Pts	Reb	Ast
G	00	(Spain) Rodrigo San Miguel	6	1	8
C	13	(United States) Mike Tobey	11	6	0
G	20	(Poland) Mateusz Ponitka	14	4	1
F	21	(United States) Tim Abromaitis	15	4	0
F	77	(Greece) Kostas Vasileiadis	9	2	2
Reserves:					
G	6	(Sweden) Tobias Borg	DNP		
C	7	(Senegal) Mamadou Niang	0	0	0
G	10	(Spain) Ferrán Bassas	0	3	2
C	17	(Spain) Fran Vázquez	12	6	0
F	25	(Hungary) Rosco Allen	0	2	0
F	33	(Spain) Javier Beirán	4	2	5
G	34	(United States) Davin White	8	0	0
Head coach:
(Hellenic Basketball Federation) Fotios Katsikaris

=== Real Madrid vs. Unicaja ===
15 February 2018	Real Madrid	89–84	Unicaja	Las Palmas
20:30	Scoring by quarter: 26–23, 20–22, 18–21, 25–18
	Pts: Campazzo 18; Rebs: Tavares 9 Asts: Campazzo 7 PIR: Campazzo 33	Boxscore	Pts: Suárez 17; Rebs: Shermadini 7 Asts: Nedović, Suárez 3 PIR: Suárez 23	Arena: Gran Canaria Arena; Attendance: 9,327; Referees: José Antonio Martín Bertrán, Carlos Peruga, Luis Miguel Castillo

Starters:			Pts	Reb	Ast
G	1	(France) Fabien Causeur	12	0	1
G	7	(Slovenia) Luka Dončić	11	5	5
G	11	(Argentina) Facundo Campazzo	18	3	7
F	33	(United States) Trey Thompkins	14	4	0
F	44	(Sweden) Jeffery Taylor	3	1	0
Reserves:					
G	2	(United States) Chasson Randle	DNP		
F	3	(Slovenia) Anthony Randolph	7	3	0
F	5	(Spain) Rudy Fernández	11	3	1
F	8	(Lithuania) Jonas Mačiulis	DNP		
F	9	(Spain) Felipe Reyes	2	0	0
G	20	(Azerbaijan) Jaycee Carroll	3	1	1
C	22	(Cape Verde) Edy Tavares	8	9	1
Head coach:
(Spanish Basketball Federation) Pablo Laso

Real Madrid	Unicaja

Starters:			Pts	Reb	Ast
G	3	(United States) Ray McCallum	10	2	2
F	11	(Spain) Dani Díez	4	2	0
G	16	(Serbia) Nemanja Nedović	11	2	3
F	23	(United States) Jeff Brooks	8	3	0
C	40	(United States) James Augustine	2	1	1
Reserves:					
C	2	(Republic of the Congo) Viny Okouo	DNP		
G	9	(Spain) Alberto Díaz	3	2	2
G	10	(Finland) Sasu Salin	9	0	1
G	12	(Serbia) Dragan Milosavljević	DNP		
C	17	(Georgia (country)) Giorgi Shermadini	5	7	2
F	21	(Poland) Adam Waczyński	15	4	1
F	43	(Spain) Carlos Suárez	17	5	3
Head coach:
(Spanish Basketball Federation) Joan Plaza

=== Herbalife Gran Canaria vs. Montakit Fuenlabrada ===
16 February 2018	Herbalife Gran Canaria	107–92	Montakit Fuenlabrada	Las Palmas
18:00	Scoring by quarter: 25–27, 33–25, 21–15, 28–25
	Pts: Balvín, Oliver 18; Rebs: Pasečņiks 9 Asts: Mekel, Seeley 4 PIR: Balvín 25	Boxscore	Pts: Cruz 20; Rebs: O'Leary 5 Asts: Cruz 8 PIR: Cruz 22	Arena: Gran Canaria Arena; Attendance: 9,172; Referees: García González, Pérez Pizarro, Aliaga

Starters:			Pts	Reb	Ast
G	9	(Israel) Gal Mekel	9	3	4
F	10	(Argentina) Nicolás Brussino	4	1	1
C	12	(Czech Republic) Ondřej Balvín	18	5	0
C	14	(Latvia) Anžejs Pasečņiks	9	9	0
F	22	(Spain) Xavi Rabaseda	2	3	1
Reserves:					
G	4	(Spain) Albert Oliver	12	0	3
F	8	(Sweden) Marcus Eriksson	6	0	0
G	11	(United States) D. J. Seeley	8	1	4
F	13	(Dominican Republic) Eulis Báez	6	3	2
G	31	(Serbia) Nikola Radičević	15	1	3
F	34	(Spain) Pablo Aguilar	18	2	0
C	40	(Armenia) Luke Fischer	0	0	0
Head coach:
(Spanish Basketball Federation) Luis Casimiro

Herbalife Gran Canaria	Montakit Fuenlabrada

Starters:			Pts	Reb	Ast
C	0	(United Kingdom) Gabriel Olaseni	11	3	0
G	11	(Mexico) Francisco Cruz	20	4	8
F	13	(Latvia) Rolands Šmits	8	4	0
G	16	(Venezuela) Gregory Vargas	10	2	6
F	31	(Democratic Republic of the Congo) Christian Eyenga	16	3	0
Reserves:					
G	2	(Croatia) Marko Popović	DNP		
F	4	(United States) Ian O'Leary	11	5	0
G	5	(Slovenia) Luka Rupnik	14	0	2
G	8	(Spain) Álex Llorca	2	1	1
C	12	(Spain) Osas Ehigiator	DNP		
C	15	(Spain) Chema González	0	2	0
G	19	(Spain) Sergio Llorente	0	0	0
Head coach:
(Argentine Basketball Confederation) Néstor García

=== FC Barcelona Lassa vs. Baskonia ===
16 February 2018	FC Barcelona Lassa	94–90	Baskonia	Las Palmas
20:30	Scoring by quarter: 28–22, 24–25, 22–20, 20–23
	Pts: Heurtel 20; Rebs: Tomić 9 Asts: Heurtel 9 PIR: Heurtel 27	Boxscore	Pts: Shengelia 30; Rebs: three players 5 Asts: Voigtmann 5 PIR: Shengelia 40	Arena: Gran Canaria Arena; Attendance: 9,695; Referees: Antonio Conde, Benjamín Jiménez Trujillo, Calatrava

Starters:			Pts	Reb	Ast
F	9	(Hungary) Ádám Hanga	5	6	1
G	13	(France) Thomas Heurtel	20	3	9
F	21	(United States) Rakim Sanders	8	1	1
C	44	(Croatia) Ante Tomić	18	9	0
F	45	(France) Adrien Moerman	5	1	0
Reserves:					
G	5	(Spain) Pau Ribas	9	4	8
G	8	(United States) Phil Pressey	DNP		
G	11	(Spain) Juan Carlos Navarro	9	2	0
F	14	(Bulgaria) Sasha Vezenkov	DNP		
F	18	(Spain) Pierre Oriola	14	7	0
G	25	(Finland) Petteri Koponen	DNP		
F	30	(Spain) Víctor Claver	6	7	1
Head coach:
(Basketball Federation of Serbia) Svetislav Pešić

FC Barcelona Lassa	Baskonia

Starters:			Pts	Reb	Ast
F	6	(Latvia) Jānis Timma	17	5	1
F	8	(Latvia) Rinalds Mālmanis	0	0	0
F	10	(France) Rodrigue Beaubois	22	1	3
G	15	(Uruguay) Jayson Granger	4	3	3
C	17	(France) Vincent Poirier	6	5	0
Reserves:					
G	3	(Argentina) Luca Vildoza	0	2	3
C	7	(Germany) Johannes Voigtmann	4	3	5
G	9	(Brazil) Marcelinho Huertas	0	1	1
G	11	(United States) Matt Janning	7	1	0
C	12	(Spain) Ilimane Diop	DNP		
PF	23	(Georgia (country)) Tornike Shengelia	30	5	1
F	29	(Argentina) Patricio Garino	0	0	0
Head coach:
(Spanish Basketball Federation) Pedro Martínez

== Semifinals ==
=== Iberostar Tenerife vs. Real Madrid ===
17 February 2018	Iberostar Tenerife	59–77	Real Madrid	Las Palmas
18:00	Scoring by quarter: 19–11, 19–26, 11–19, 10–21
	Pts: Vázquez 16; Rebs: Abromaitis 8 Asts: Bassas, San Miguel 4 PIR: Vázquez 15	Boxscore	Pts: Dončić 17; Rebs: Dončić, Tavares 7 Asts: Dončić 5 PIR: Dončić 28	Arena: Gran Canaria Arena; Attendance: 9,346; Referees: Miguel Ángel Pérez Pérez, Benjamín Jiménez Trujillo, Carlos Cortés

Starters:			Pts	Reb	Ast
C	13	(United States) Mike Tobey	14	7	1
G	20	(Poland) Mateusz Ponitka	8	3	2
F	21	(United States) Tim Abromaitis	4	8	2
F	77	(Greece) Kostas Vasileiadis	0	3	3
G	00	(Spain) Rodrigo San Miguel	5	4	4
Reserves:					
G	6	(Sweden) Tobias Borg	0	0	0
C	7	(Senegal) Mamadou Niang	DNP		
G	10	(Spain) Ferran Bassas	0	1	4
C	17	(Spain) Fran Vázquez	16	3	0
F	25	(Hungary) Rosco Allen	0	0	0
F	33	(Spain) Javier Beirán	4	5	1
G	34	(United States) Devin White	8	1	1
Head coach:
(Hellenic Basketball Federation) Fotios Katsikaris

Iberostar Tenerife	Real Madrid

Starters:			Pts	Reb	Ast
G	1	(France) Fabien Causeur	7	3	0
G	11	(Argentina) Facundo Campazzo	6	3	0
C	22	(Cape Verde) Edy Tavares	4	7	0
F	33	(United States) Trey Thompkins	13	3	0
F	44	(Sweden) Jeffery Taylor	1	1	0
Reserves:					
F	3	(Slovenia) Anthony Randolph	2	4	0
F	5	(Spain) Rudy Fernández	13	2	0
G	7	(Slovenia) Luka Dončić	17	7	5
F	8	(Lithuania) Jonas Mačiulis	0	1	0
F	9	(Spain) Felipe Reyes	0	4	0
C	14	(Mexico) Gustavo Ayón	DNP		
G	20	(Azerbaijan) Jaycee Carroll	14	2	0
Head coach:
(Spanish Basketball Federation) Pablo Laso

=== Herbalife Gran Canaria vs. FC Barcelona Lassa ===
17 February 2018	Herbalife Gran Canaria	74–87	FC Barcelona	Las Palmas
20:30	Scoring by quarter: 15–21, 28–20, 13–27, 18–19
	Pts: Eriksson 25; Rebs: Aguilar 7 Asts: Oliver 4 PIR: Eriksson 28	Boxscore	Pts: Oriola 14; Rebs: Claver 8 Asts: Heurtel 14; PIR: Heurtel 24	Arena: Gran Canaria Arena; Attendance: 9,844; Referees: Juan Carlos García González, Antonio Conde, Calatrava

Starters:			Pts	Reb	Ast
G	9	(Israel) Gal Mekel	2	0	2
F	10	(Argentina) Nicolás Brussino	8	2	1
C	12	(Czech Republic) Ondřej Balvín	3	4	0
F	22	(Spain) Xavi Rabaseda	2	2	3
F	34	(Spain) Pablo Aguilar	11	7	1
Reserves:					
G	4	(Spain) Albert Oliver	5	2	4
F	8	(Sweden) Marcus Eriksson	25	6	0
G	11	(United States) D. J. Seeley	2	2	1
F	13	(Dominican Republic) Eulis Báez	3	2	2
C	14	(Latvia) Anžejs Pasečņiks	10	1	1
G	31	(Serbia) Nikola Radičević	3	2	2
C	40	(Armenia) Luke Fischer	DNP		
Head coach:
(Spanish Basketball Federation) Luis Casimiro

Herbalife Gran Canaria	FC Barcelona Lassa

Starters:			Pts	Reb	Ast
G	13	(France) Thomas Heurtel	13	4	14
F	21	(United States) Rakim Sanders	8	0	1
G	25	(Finland) Petteri Koponen	4	1	1
C	44	(Croatia) Ante Tomić	6	5	0
F	45	(France) Adrien Moerman	7	6	0
Reserves:					
G	5	(Spain) Pau Ribas	12	2	2
G	8	(United States) Phil Pressey	DNP		
F	9	(Hungary) Ádám Hanga	12	6	1
G	11	(Spain) Juan Carlos Navarro	3	1	3
F	14	(Bulgaria) Sasha Vezenkov	DNP		
F	18	(Spain) Pierre Oriola	14	1	0
F	30	(Spain) Víctor Claver	8	8	1
Head coach:
(Basketball Federation of Serbia) Svetislav Pešić

== Final ==
18 February 2018	Real Madrid	90–92	FC Barcelona Lassa	Las Palmas
17:30	Scoring by quarter: 21–15, 13–25, 18–27, 38–25
	Pts: Carroll 18; Rebs: Dončić 5 Asts: Campazzo, Dončić 3 PIR: Thompkins 18	Boxscore	Pts: Ribas 21; Rebs: Moerman 7 Asts: Heurtel 7 PIR: Ribas 24	Arena: Gran Canaria Arena; Attendance: 9,912; Referees: Daniel Hierrezuelo, Emilio Pérez Pizarro, Carlos Peruga

Starters:			Pts	Reb	Ast
G	11	(Argentina) Facundo Campazzo	14	2	3
G	7	(Slovenia) Luka Dončić	14	5	3
G	1	(France) Fabien Causeur	2	2	0
F	33	(United States) Trey Thompkins	17	3	0
C	22	(Cape Verde) Edy Tavares	2	4	0
Reserves:					
F	3	(Slovenia) Anthony Randolph	2	0	0
F	5	(Spain) Rudy Fernández	14	4	1
F	8	(Lithuania) Jonas Mačiulis	DNP		
F	9	(Spain) Felipe Reyes	2	1	0
C	14	(Mexico) Gustavo Ayón	3	1	0
G	20	(Azerbaijan) Jaycee Carroll	18	0	1
F	44	(Sweden) Jeffery Taylor	2	1	2
Head coach:
(Spanish Basketball Federation) Pablo Laso

Real Madrid	FC Barcelona Lassa

Starters:			Pts	Reb	Ast
G	13	(France) Thomas Heurtel	8	4	7
F	9	(Hungary) Adam Hanga	12	3	0
F	21	(United States) Rakim Sanders	12	4	0
F	45	(France) Adrien Moerman	4	7	0
C	44	(Croatia) Ante Tomić	17	5	0
Reserves:					
G	5	(Spain) Pau Ribas	21	4	2
G	8	(United States) Phil Pressey	DNP		
G	11	(Spain) Juan Carlos Navarro	0	1	0
F	14	(Bulgaria) Sasha Vezenkov	DNP		
F	18	(Spain) Pierre Oriola	9	1	1
G	25	(Finland) Petteri Koponen	2	1	0
F	30	(Spain) Víctor Claver	7	5	0
Head coach:
(Basketball Federation of Serbia) Svetislav Pešić
