= 2015 Supercopa de España de Baloncesto =

2015 Supercopa Endesa
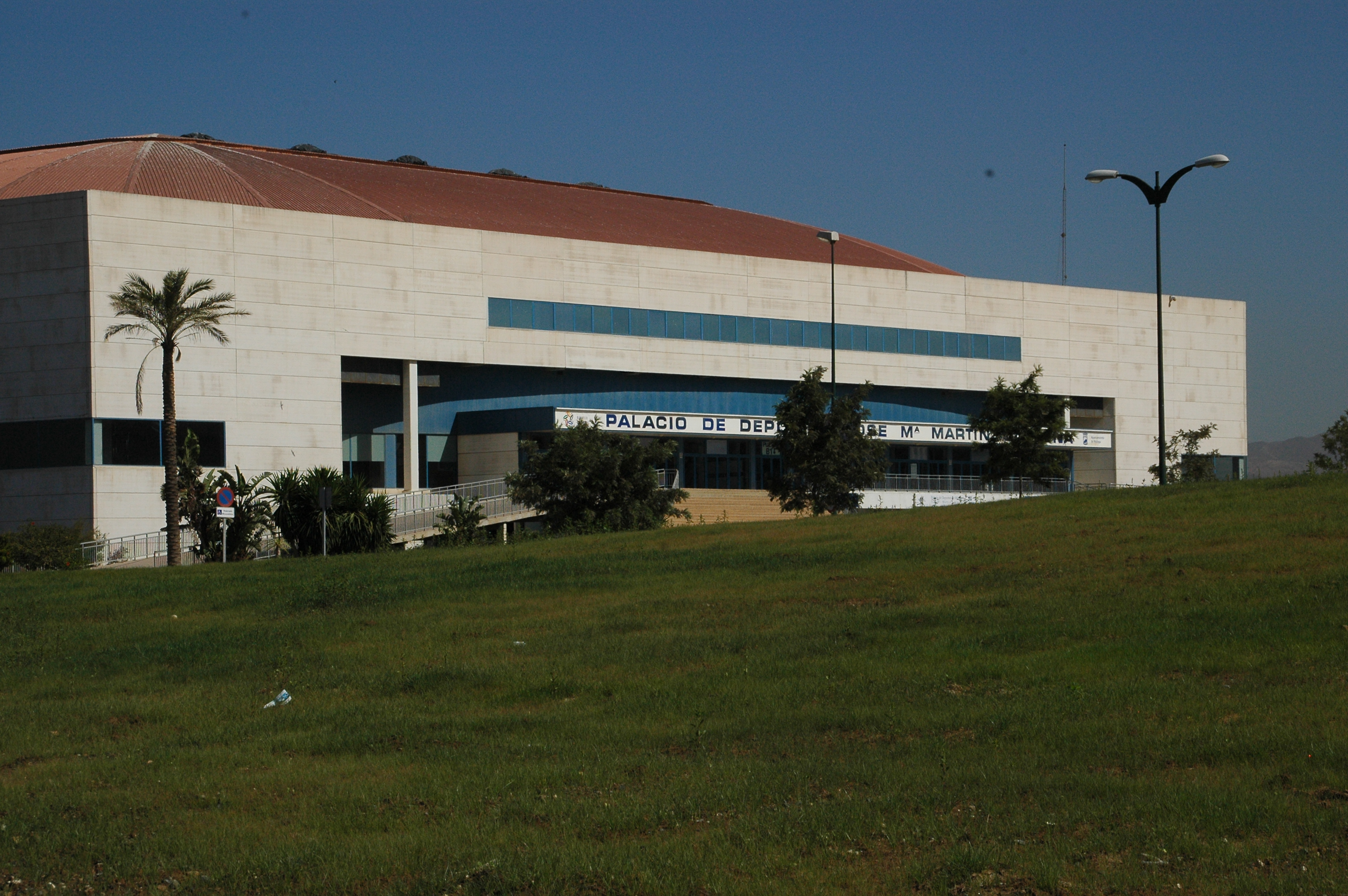
- The Martín Carpena hosted the Supercopa

Tournament details
- Arena: Martín Carpena; Málaga, Spain
- Dates: 2 October 2015– 3 October 2015

Final positions
- Champions: FC Barcelona; 6th title
- Runners-up: Unicaja

Awards and statistics
- MVP: (Spain) Pau Ribas
- Top scorer(s): (Lithuania) Mindaugas Kuzminskas – 25

The Supercopa de España de Baloncesto 2015 is the 12th edition of the tournament since it is organized by the ACB and the 16th overall. It is also called Supercopa Endesa for sponsorship reasons.

It will be played in the Palacio de Deportes José María Martín Carpena in Málaga on 2 and 3 October. After the 2004 and 2006 editions, this will be the third Supercopa at the Andalusian city.

== Participant teams ==
The ACB board confirmed the participants on 22 June 2015 and they were drawn on 23 September.

Team	Qualified as	Appearance	Qualification date
Unicaja	Host team	4th	25 May 2013
Real Madrid	2014–15 ACB champion	13th	22 February 2015
Herbalife Gran Canaria	2014–15 Eurocup runner-up	2nd	23 April 2015
FC Barcelona Lassa	2015 Copa del Rey runner-up	12th	14 June 2015

== Semifinals ==
=== Herbalife Gran Canaria vs. FC Barcelona Lassa ===
2 October 2015	Herbalife Gran Canaria	60–88	FC Barcelona Lassa	Málaga
19:00 (CEST)	Scoring by quarter: 13–16, 19–25, 15–30, 13–17
	Pts: Pangos 13; Rebs: four players 4 Asts: Pangos 6 PIR: Savané 14	Boxscore	Pts: Eriksson 16; Rebs: three players 5 Asts: Satoranský 8 PIR: Eriksson 19	Arena: Martín Carpena; Referees: García González, Conde, Peruga

Starters:			Pts	Reb	Ast
PG	3	(Canada) Kevin Pangos	13	4	6
SG	9	(Finland) Sasu Salin	10	4	2
SF	22	(Spain) Xavi Rabaseda	1	2	2
PF	13	(Dominican Republic) Eulis Báez	7	1	1
C	7	(Senegal) Sitapha Savané	12	2	3
Reserves:					
PG	4	(Spain) Albert Oliver	2	1	5
SF	8	(Australia) Brad Newley	4	3	1
C	14	(Latvia) Anžejs Pasečņiks	DNP		
SG	21	(Spain) Oriol Paulí	0	4	0
C	23	(Slovenia) Alen Omić	8	4	1
SG	24	(United States) Kyle Kuric	2	0	0
PF	34	(Spain) Pablo Aguilar	1	4	0
Head coach:
(Spain) Aíto García Reneses

Herbalife Gran Canaria	FC Barcelona Lassa

Starters:			Pts	Reb	Ast
PG	13	(Czech Republic) Tomáš Satoranský	11	1	8
SG	8	(Spain) Pau Ribas	9	2	3
SF	10	(Spain) Álex Abrines	10	2	1
PF	5	(United States) Justin Doellman	14	2	1
C	9	(Nigeria) Shane Lawal	0	5	0
Reserves:					
PF	14	(Bulgaria) Sasha Vezenkov	0	5	1
SF	20	(Sweden) Marcus Eriksson	16	2	0
C	21	(Senegal) Moussa Diagne	4	4	0
SG	24	(United States) Brad Oleson	8	0	3
PG	30	(Puerto Rico) Carlos Arroyo	7	2	2
SF	33	(Greece) Stratos Perperoglou	2	2	2
C	44	(Croatia) Ante Tomić	7	5	0
Head coach:
(Spain) Xavi Pascual

=== Unicaja vs. Real Madrid ===
2 October 2015	Unicaja	94–79	Real Madrid	Málaga
21:30 (CEST)	Scoring by quarter: 17–17, 29–20, 26–15, 22–27
	Pts: Thomas 15; Rebs: Hendrix 6 Asts: Marković 7 PIR: Thomas 14	Boxscore	Pts: Reyes 18; Rebs: Reyes 10; Asts: Rodríguez 4 PIR: Reyes 25	Arena: Martín Carpena; Attendance: 10,156; Referees: Pérez Pizarro, Pérez Pérez, Calatrava

Starters:			Pts	Reb	Ast
PG	9	(Serbia) Stefan Marković	5	1	7
SG	15	(United States) Jamar Smith	12	0	1
SF	11	(Spain) Dani Díez	10	3	0
PF	10	(United States) Will Thomas	15	5	0
C	17	(Spain) Fran Vázquez	4	2	0
Reserves:					
SG	1	(France) Edwin Jackson	4	2	4
PG	4	(Spain) Alberto Díaz	2	0	2
C	7	(United States) Richard Hendrix	9	6	0
PF	12	(Spain) Carlos Suárez	4	5	4
PF	14	(Spain) Germán Gabriel	4	3	0
SG	16	(Serbia) Nemanja Nedović	12	1	4
SF	19	(Lithuania) Mindaugas Kuzminskas	13	1	1
Head coach:
(Spain) Joan Plaza

Unicaja	Real Madrid

Starters:			Pts	Reb	Ast
PG	23	(Spain) Sergio Llull	8	1	3
SG	20	(Azerbaijan) Jaycee Carroll	16	2	2
SF	8	(Lithuania) Jonas Mačiulis	4	3	1
PF	9	(Spain) Felipe Reyes	18	10	2
C	14	(Mexico) Gustavo Ayón	4	4	1
Reserves:					
SF	6	(Argentina) Andrés Nocioni	0	1	1
SG	7	(Slovenia) Luka Dončić	9	3	1
PG	13	(Spain) Sergio Rodríguez	16	2	4
PF	17	(Montenegro) Dino Radončić	DNP		
PF	33	(United States) Trey Thompkins	2	2	0
C	41	(Spain) Guillermo Hernangómez	2	1	0
Head coach:
(Spain) Pablo Laso

== Final ==
3 October 2015	Unicaja	62–80	FC Barcelona Lassa	Málaga
19:00 (CEST)	Scoring by quarter: 15–22, 16–15, 12–20, 19–23
	Pts: Kuzminskas 12; Rebs: Thomas 6 Asts: Marković 3 PIR: three players 10	Boxscore	Pts: Ribas 15; Rebs: Lawal 8 Asts: Arroyo 6 PIR: Ribas 25	Arena: Martín Carpena; Attendance: 10,310; Referees: García González, Pérez Pérez, Peruga

Starters:			Pts	Reb	Ast
PG	9	(Serbia) Stefan Marković	3	1	3
SG	1	(France) Edwin Jackson	8	2	0
SF	19	(Lithuania) Mindaugas Kuzminskas	12	3	1
PF	10	(United States) Will Thomas	9	6	1
C	17	(Spain) Fran Vázquez	7	3	0
Reserves:					
PG	4	(Spain) Alberto Díaz	0	1	0
C	7	(United States) Richard Hendrix	9	2	1
SF	11	(Spain) Dani Díez	3	2	0
PF	12	(Spain) Carlos Suárez	0	0	1
PF	14	(Spain) Germán Gabriel	5	3	0
SG	15	(United States) Jamar Smith	2	1	2
SG	16	(Serbia) Nemanja Nedović	4	0	2
Head coach:
(Spain) Joan Plaza

Unicaja	FC Barcelona Lassa

Supercopa Endesa MVP
(Spain) Pau Ribas
Game rules
Game was played under FIBA rules.

2015 Supercopa Endesa Winners
FC Barcelona Lassa
6th title

Starters:			Pts	Reb	Ast
PG	13	(Czech Republic) Tomáš Satoranský	0	3	2
SG	8	(Spain) Pau Ribas	15	3	3
SF	33	(Greece) Stratos Perperoglou	13	1	2
PF	5	(United States) Justin Doellman	7	1	0
C	9	(Nigeria) Shane Lawal	6	8	1
Reserves:					
SF	10	(Spain) Álex Abrines	4	4	0
PF	14	(Bulgaria) Sasha Vezenkov	8	4	1
SF	20	(Sweden) Marcus Eriksson	0	0	0
C	21	(Senegal) Moussa Diagne	2	0	0
SG	24	(United States) Brad Oleson	9	0	2
PG	30	(Puerto Rico) Carlos Arroyo	10	4	6
C	44	(Croatia) Ante Tomić	6	4	1
Head coach:
(Spain) Xavi Pascual
