= Ovidijus =

- Gender: Male
- Language: Lithuanian
- Name day: 12 September

Origin
- Region of origin: Lithuania

Ovidijus is a Lithuanian masculine given name. People with the name Ovidijus include:

- Ovidijus Galdikas (born 1988), Lithuanian basketball player
- Ovidijus Verbickas (born 1993), Lithuanian footballer
- Ovidijus Varanauskas (born 1991), Lithuanian basketball player
- Ovidijus Vyšniauskas (born 1957), Lithuanian musician
