= Pau Ribas =

Spanish basketball player

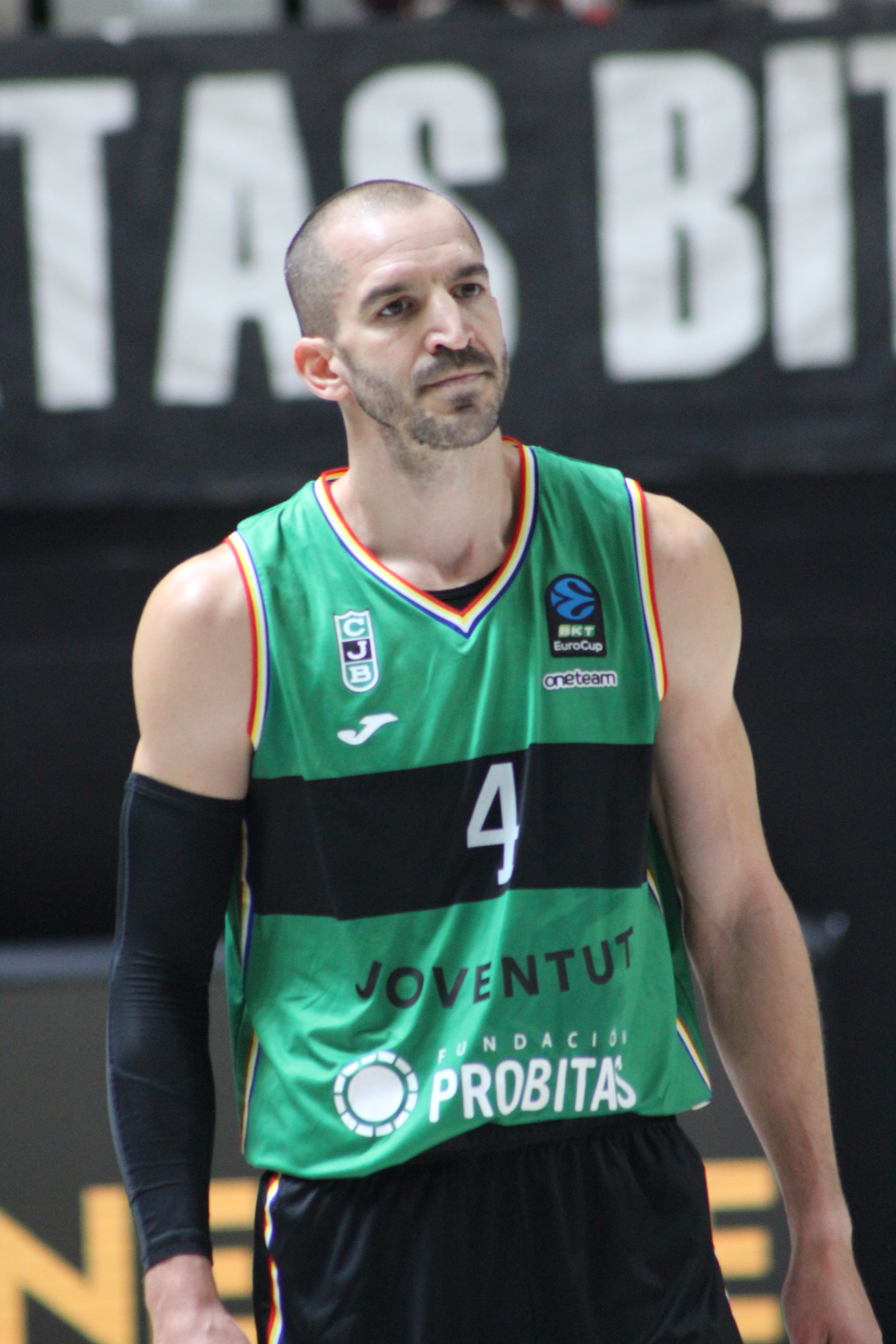
- Ribas with Joventut Badalona in 2024

Personal information
- Born: 2 March 1987 (age 39) Barcelona, Spain
- Listed height: 1.96 m (6 ft 5 in)
- Listed weight: 95 kg (209 lb)

Career information
- NBA draft: 2009: undrafted
- Playing career: 2005–2025
- Position: Shooting guard

Career history
- 2005–2009: Joventut
- 2005–2007: →Prat
- 2009–2012: Caja Laboral
- 2012–2015: Valencia
- 2015–2020: Barcelona
- 2020–2025: Joventut

Career highlights
- All-Spanish League Team (2015); Spanish League (2010); Spanish King's Cup (2008, 2018, 2019); Spanish Supercup MVP (2015)
Medals
Men's basketball
Representing Spain
World Cup
Gold medal – first place	2019 China
EuroBasket
Gold medal – first place	2015 France–Croatia–Germany–Latvia

Pau Ribas Tossas (born 2 March 1987) is a Spanish former professional basketball player. He played most of his career for Catalan Liga ACB teams FC Barcelona and Joventut Badalona. Standing at 1.96 m (6 ft 5 in), he primarily played in the shooting guard position. His father, Jordi Ribas, was also a professional basketball player.

== Professional career ==
Ribas is a product of the Joventut Badalona basketball academy. He climbed through the team's youth ranks before joining associated team CB Prat for two seasons in 2005, first in the Liga EBA and then the LEB Plata. He made his Liga ACB debut on October 20, 2005, playing for the Joventut senior team in a game against Bàsquet Manresa. He would join the senior Joventut Badalona roster for the 2007-08 ACB season, playing two seasons for the Catalans.

In July 2009, Ribas joined the Spanish EuroLeague club Caja Laboral. In July 2012, he signed a three-year deal with Valencia Basket.

On 23 July 2015, he signed a three-year deal with FC Barcelona Lassa. After winning the 2015 Supercopa, Ribas was named the Supercopa MVP. On 26 October 2016, Ribas had a season-ending injury and was out for the rest of the 2016–17 season after just three EuroLeague games. On 17 July 2018, he re-signed with FC Barcelona Lassa on a three-year deal. On 4 July 2020, it was announced that Ribas had mutually parted ways with the Catalan club after five seasons.

In July 2020, Ribas returned to Joventut Badalona 11 years after his first spell with the Catalans. Ribas announced his retirement in May 2025, at the end of the 2024-25 ACB season. Ribas played his last game on June 4th, 2025, in a defeat against CB Canarias in the 2025 ACB Playoffs.

== Spain national teams ==
Ribas played internationally with the Spain junior national teams at the 2005 FIBA Europe Under-18 Championship, and at the 2006 FIBA Europe Under-20 Championship. They won the silver medal at the 2007 FIBA Europe Under-20 Championship.

With the senior Spain national team, Ribas won gold medal at the EuroBasket 2015 and at the 2019 FIBA Basketball World Cup.

== Career statistics ==
Legend
GP	Games played	GS	Games started	MPG	Minutes per game
FG%	Field-goal percentage	3P%	3-point field-goal percentage	FT%	Free-throw percentage
RPG	Rebounds per game	APG	Assists per game	SPG	Steals per game
BPG	Blocks per game	PPG	Points per game	PIR	Performance index rating
**Bold**	Career high

=== EuroLeague ===
*	Led the league

Year	Team	GP	GS	MPG	FG%	3P%	FT%	RPG	APG	SPG	BPG	PPG	PIR
2008–09	Badalona	10	4	19.8	.383	.313	.778	1.4	2.3	**1.2**	—	7.0	5.9
2009–10	Baskonia	20	**15**	20.2	.391	.360	**1.000**	2.0	2.1	.5	**.1**	4.5	4.3
2010–11	Baskonia	20	2	12.9	.444	.320	.200	1.6	1.0	.5	—	2.5	2.8
2011–12	Baskonia	10	3	17.5	.420	.176	.875	**2.5**	1.8	.9	—	5.2	5.3
2014–15	Valencia	10	4	**24.1**	.489	.439	.769	2.3	**3.6**	1.1	—	**11.8**	**12.3**
2015–16	Barcelona	27	4	18.5	.447	.424	.939*	1.9	2.7	.7	—	6.1	7.6
2016–17	Barcelona	2	0	10.0	.429	**.500**	—	.5	.5	.5	—	4.5	3.5
2017–18	Barcelona	**28**	12	17.8	**.500**	.478	**1.000**	1.6	3.0	.7	**.1**	6.7	8.1
2018–19	Barcelona	26	11	17.4	.356	.386	.800	1.9	2.1	.7	—	5.4	5.3
2019–20	Barcelona	12	1	9.3	.261	.188	.571	1.2	1.5	.3	—	1.6	2.2
Career		165	56	17.3	.426	.389	.833	1.8	2.2	.7	.0	5.5	5.9

== Awards and accomplishments ==
=== Club honours ===
- FIBA EuroCup: 2005–06
- EuroCup: 2007–08, 2013–14
- Spanish League: 2009–10
- Spanish King's Cup: 2008, 2018 and 2019
- Spanish Supercup: 2015

=== Spain national team ===
Senior

- EuroBasket 2015: Gold
- World Cup 2019 : Gold

Under-20

- 2007 FIBA Europe Under-20 Championship: Silver

== Personal ==
Ribas is known for his frequent take on political stances. He has also written articles for the Catalan newspaper Ara, known for its Catalan nationalist and independentist editorial policy.
