= Anžejs Pasečņiks =

Latvian basketball player (born 1995)

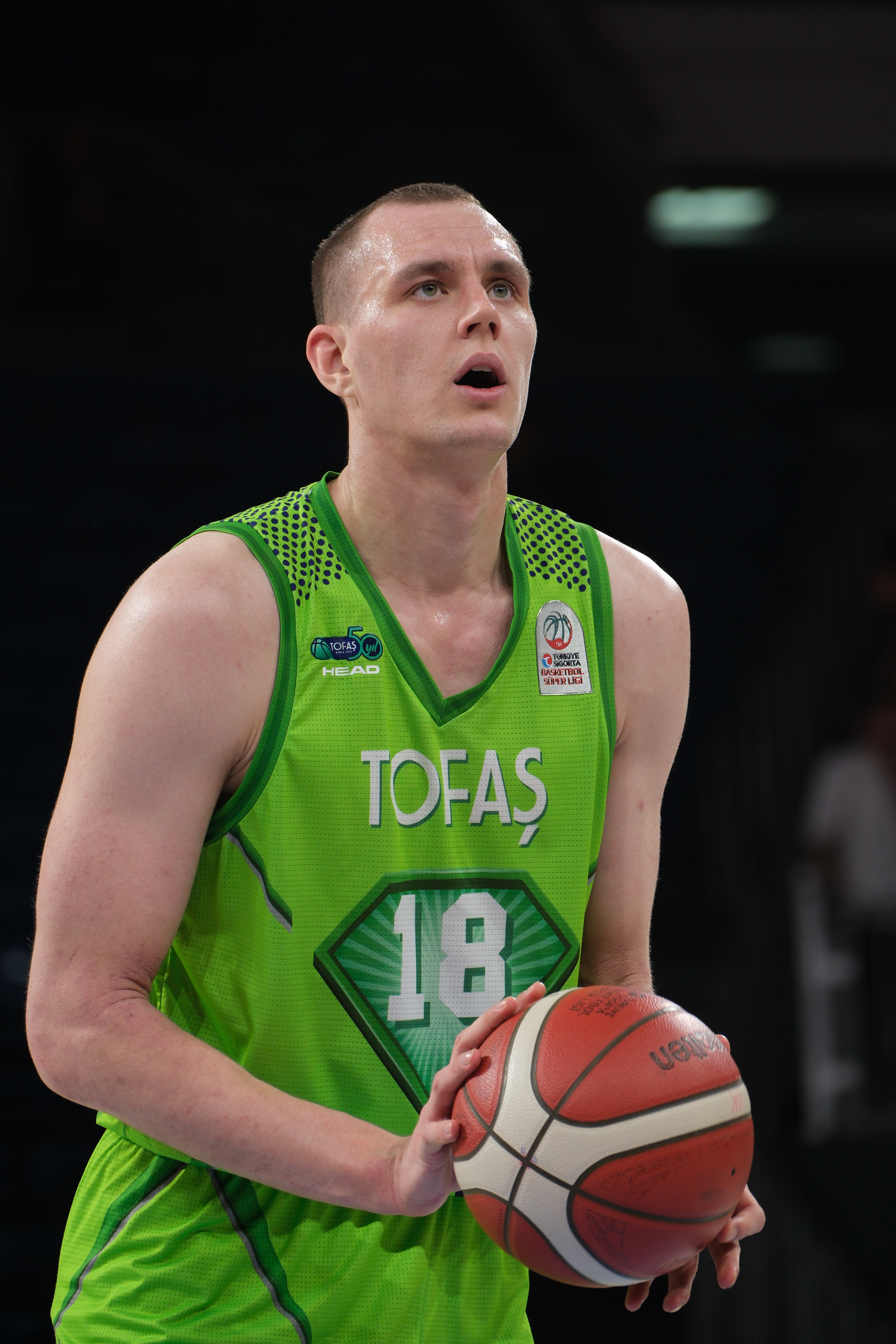
- Pasečņiks with Tofaş in 2025

No. 18 – Petkim Spor
- Position: Center / power forward
- League: Basketbol Süper Ligi

Personal information
- Born: 20 December 1995 (age 30) Riga, Latvia
- Listed height: 216 cm (7 ft 1 in)
- Listed weight: 103 kg (227 lb)

Career information
- NBA draft: 2017: 1st round, 25th overall pick
- Drafted by: Orlando Magic
- Playing career: 2012–present

Career history
- 2012–2015: VEF Rīga
- 2015–2019: Herbalife Gran Canaria
- 2019: Capital City Go-Go
- 2019–2021: Washington Wizards
- 2021–2022: Real Betis
- 2022–2023: Metropolitans 92
- 2023: Real Betis
- 2023–2024: Zunder Palencia
- 2024–2025: Tofaş
- 2025–2026: Hsinchu Toplus Lioneers
- 2026–present: Petkim Spor

Career highlights
- 3× LBL champion (2012, 2013, 2015); Spanish Supercup champion (2016); Spanish League All-Young Players Team (2017)
- Stats at NBA.com
- Stats at Basketball Reference

Anžejs Pasečņiks (Latvian pronunciation: ['an.ʒɛ͡is 'pa.sɛt͡ʃ.ɲiks]; born 20 December 1995) is a Latvian professional basketball player for the Petkim Spor of the Basketbol Süper Ligi.

== Professional career ==
=== VEF Rīga (2012–2015) ===
He made his professional debut in the Latvian League with VEF Rīga in 2012.

=== Herbalife Gran Canaria (2015–2019) ===
In August 2015, Pasečņiks signed with the Spanish club Herbalife Gran Canaria. He would play in its reserve team, club of the Liga EBA, fourth division. He debuted with the ACB team in the Supercopa Endesa.

=== Washington Wizards / Capital City Go-Go (2019–2021) ===
Pasečņiks was drafted by the Orlando Magic with the 25th overall pick in the first round of the 2017 NBA draft. He was immediately traded to the Philadelphia 76ers for future first-round and second-round picks.

On 1 July 2019, the Sixers renounced their draft right to Pasečņiks and two days later, he joined the Washington Wizards summer league team. On 16 October, he signed by the Wizards, but was waived three days later. On 27 October, joined the Capital City Go-Go. On 17 December, the Wizards announced that they had signed Pasečņiks to a two-way contract. On 18 December, Pasečņiks made his debut in the NBA, coming off from bench with nine points, eight rebounds and an assist in a 110–109 overtime loss to the Chicago Bulls. On 12 January 2020, the Wizards announced that they had signed Pasečņiks to a multi-year contract. The Wizards waived Pasečņiks on 17 January 2021.

=== Real Betis (2021–2022) ===
On 9 November 2021, Pasečņiks signed with Real Betis of the Spanish Liga ACB.

=== Metropolitans 92 (2022–2023) ===
On 30 November 2022, Pasečņiks signed with Metropolitans 92.

=== Zunder Palencia (2023–2024) ===
On 23 August 2023, Pasečņiks signed with Zunder Palencia.

On 12 August 2024, Pasečņiks signed a two-way contract with the Milwaukee Bucks, but was waived on 21 October.

=== Tofaş (2024–2025) ===
On 5 November 2024, Pasečņiks signed with Tofaş of the Basketball Super League.

=== Hsinchu Toplus Lioneers (2025–2026) ===
On August 13, 2025, Pasečņiks signed with the Hsinchu Toplus Lioneers of the Taiwan Professional Basketball League (TPBL).

=== Petkim Spor (2026–present) ===
On August 26, 2026, Pasečņiks signed with the Petkim Spor of the Basketbol Süper Ligi.

== National team career ==
He was a regular Latvia youth national team player. He helped Latvia's U-18 national team reach semi-finals at the 2013 FIBA Europe Under-18 Championship, where he was named to the All-Tournament Team, averaging 12.6 points and 7.7 rebounds at the tournament.

== Accomplishments and awards ==
=== Individual ===
- 2013 FIBA Europe Under-18 Championship: All-Tournament Team
- European Under-18 All-Star Game MVP (2013)

== Career statistics ==
Legend
GP	Games played	GS	Games started	MPG	Minutes per game
FG%	Field goal percentage	3P%	3-point field goal percentage	FT%	Free throw percentage
RPG	Rebounds per game	APG	Assists per game	SPG	Steals per game
BPG	Blocks per game	PPG	Points per game	**Bold**	Career high

=== NBA ===
==== Regular season ====
Year	Team	GP	GS	MPG	FG%	3P%	FT%	RPG	APG	SPG	BPG	PPG
2019–20	Washington	**27**	0	**16.2**	**.526**	.000	**.586**	**4.0**	.7	**.3**	**.4**	**5.8**
2020–21	Washington	1	0	6.0	.000	.000	—	1.0	**1.0**	.0	.0	.0
Career		28	0	15.8	.521	.000	.586	3.9	.7	.3	.4	5.6
