= Sitapha Savané =

Senegalese basketball player

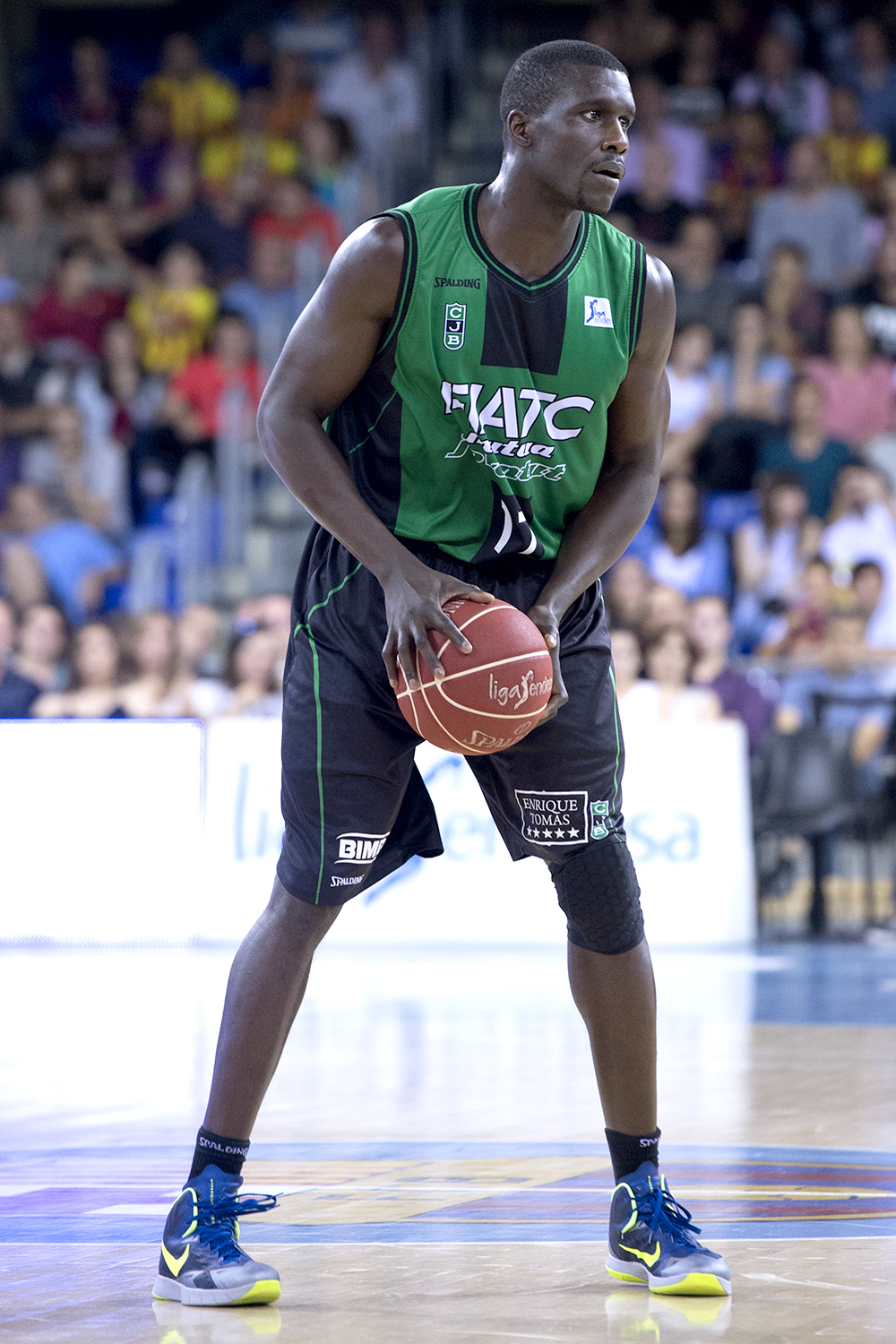
- Sitapha in 2015

Personal information
- Born: October 20, 1978 (age 48) Dakar, Senegal
- Listed height: 2.01 m (6 ft 7 in)
- Listed weight: 103 kg (227 lb)

Career information
- High school: UN International School (New York City, New York)
- College: Navy (1997–2000)
- NBA draft: 2000: undrafted
- Playing career: 2000–2018
- Position: Center
- Number: 17

Career history
- 2000–2001: Menorca
- 2001–2004: Tenerife
- 2004–2012: Gran Canaria
- 2012–2015: Joventut Badalona
- 2015–2016: Gran Canaria
- 2016–2018: Estudiantes

Sitapha Alfred Savané Sagna (born 20 August 1978) is a Senegalese retired professional basketball player. He was a member of the Senegal national basketball team. He played his entire professional career in Spain, most of it in the ACB League.

== Early life ==
Sitapha Alfred Savané was born on 20 October 1978 in Dakar, Senegal, son to Landing Savané and Marie-Angélique Savané (née Sagna); his father (a Muslim) has been a key figure in the Senegalese left-wing, while his mother (a Catholic) is a noted feminist and has been a UN official. Savané lived for a while in Geneva (where his mother worked), moving to the United States at age fourteen. He attended the United Nations International School, where he caught the attention of the US Naval Academy.

== College ==
Savané attended the United States Naval Academy, from which he graduated in 2000. (Note: He was featured in the book The Last Amateurs.) In his junior and senior seasons, Savané was first team all Patriot League. He also led Navy in scoring, rebounding, blocks, field goal percentage and steals. He originally planned to not attend Navy, but when his Service Time was shortened he reconsidered.

== Professional ==
Savané went undrafted in the 2000 NBA draft (although he was drafted 13th in the second round of the USBL draft). He spent however all his career in Spain, especially in CB Gran Canaria where he spent eight seasons.

With Tenerife CB he won a Copa Príncipe de Asturias and a LEB Oro, promoting to Liga ACB.

He announced his retirement in May 2018.

== Activity after retirement ==
Savané became a sports commentator for Movistar+ after his retirement.

== Awards ==
- Hijo Adoptivo ("adoptive son") of Las Palmas (6 June 2016).
