= Gran Canaria Arena =

Arena in Las Palmas, Canary Islands, Spain

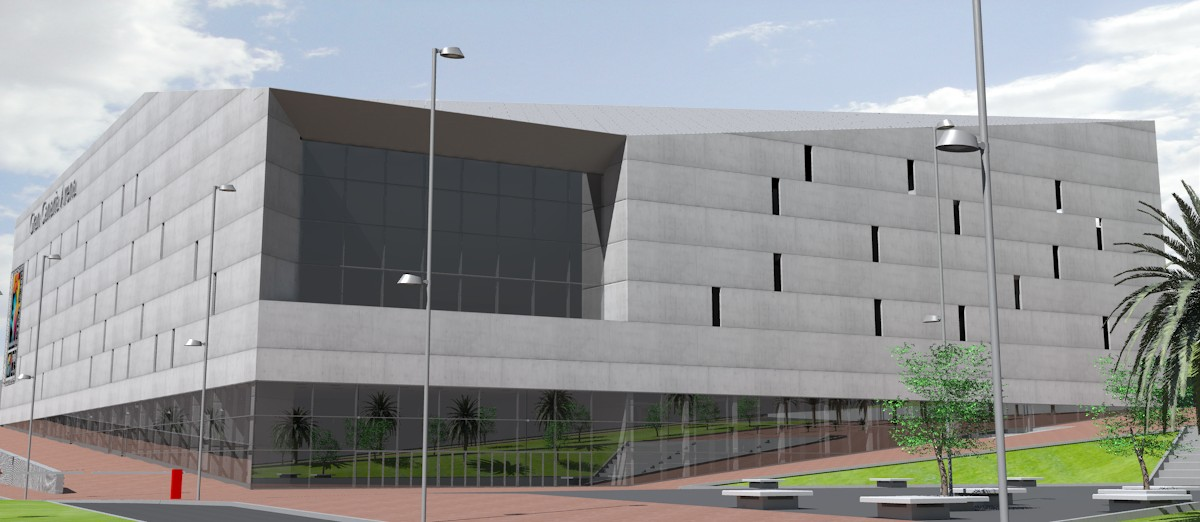
- Interactive map of Gran Canaria Arena
- Former names: Palacio Multiusos de Gran Canaria
- Location: Las Palmas, Spain
- Coordinates: 28°06′10″N 15°27′26″W
- Owner: Cabildo of Gran Canaria
- Capacity: 11,500
- Record attendance: 10,200 (United States vs Slovenia, 26 August 2014)

Construction
- Groundbreaking: January 2011
- Opened: 15 March 2014
- Cost: € 67 million
- Architects: Eduardo Pérez Gómez; Miguel Ángel Sánchez García; (LLPS Arquitectos)

Tenant
- CB Gran Canaria (2014–present)

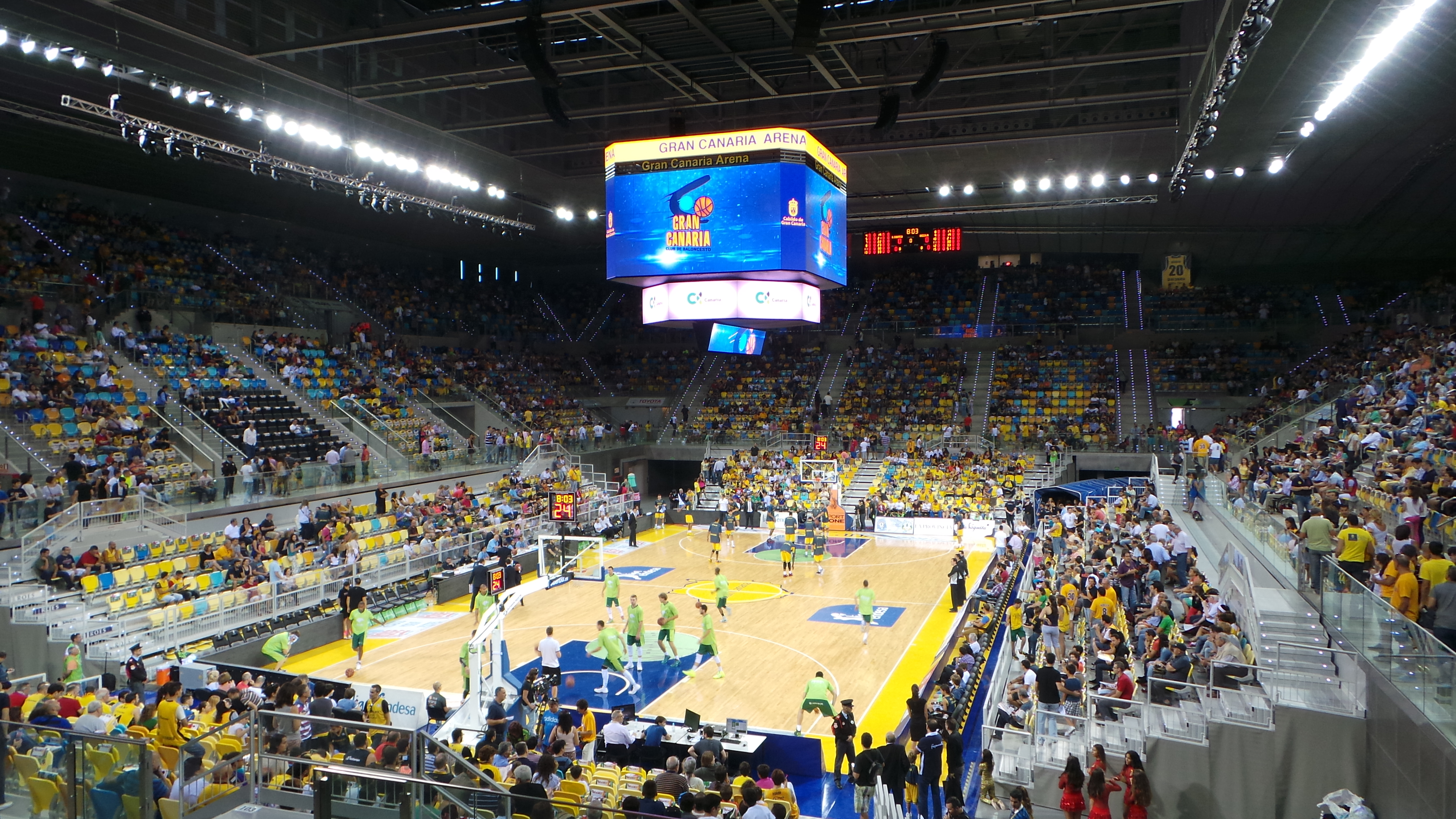
Gran Canaria Arena

Gran Canaria Arena, originally known as Palacio Multiusos de Gran Canaria, is an indoor sporting arena located in Las Palmas, Canary Islands, Spain. The arena, opened in 2014 by Mariano Rajoy, has a capacity of 11,470 spectators and is the home arena of CB Gran Canaria.

The first game in Gran Canaria Arena was the game of the 28th round of the 2013–14 ACB season between Herbalife Gran Canaria and FC Barcelona, played on 1 May 2014.

The arena hosted of the groups of the main round of the 2014 FIBA Basketball World Cup and the basketball's Copa del Rey in February 2015.

== Attendances ==
This is a list of games attendances of CB Gran Canaria at Gran Canaria Arena.

Liga ACB					European competitions				
Season	Total	High	Low	Average	Season	Total	High	Low	Average
2013–14 (Note: Only four games were played in this arena.)	31,088	9,332	5,855	7,772	did not enter any European competition				
2014–15	112,652	9,056	4,125	6,258	2014–15 EC	53,371	9,875	2,913	4,478
2015–16	121,765	9,097	4,859	6,765	2015–16 EC	45,727	7,908	2,053	4,157
2016–17	109,883	8,661	4,283	6,464	2016–17 EC	29,896	5,202	2,393	3,737
2017–18	111,434	6,978	4,176	5,865	2017–18 EC	36,526	5,567	2,725	4,058
2018–19	89,467	7,349	1,849	5,263	2018–19 EL	72,348	7,430	3,648	4,823
2019–20 (Note: Season suspended due to the COVID-19 pandemic.)	67,342	7,271	5,364	6,122	did not enter any European competition				

== See also ==
- List of indoor arenas in Spain
