= Ovidijus Galdikas =

Lithuanian basketball player

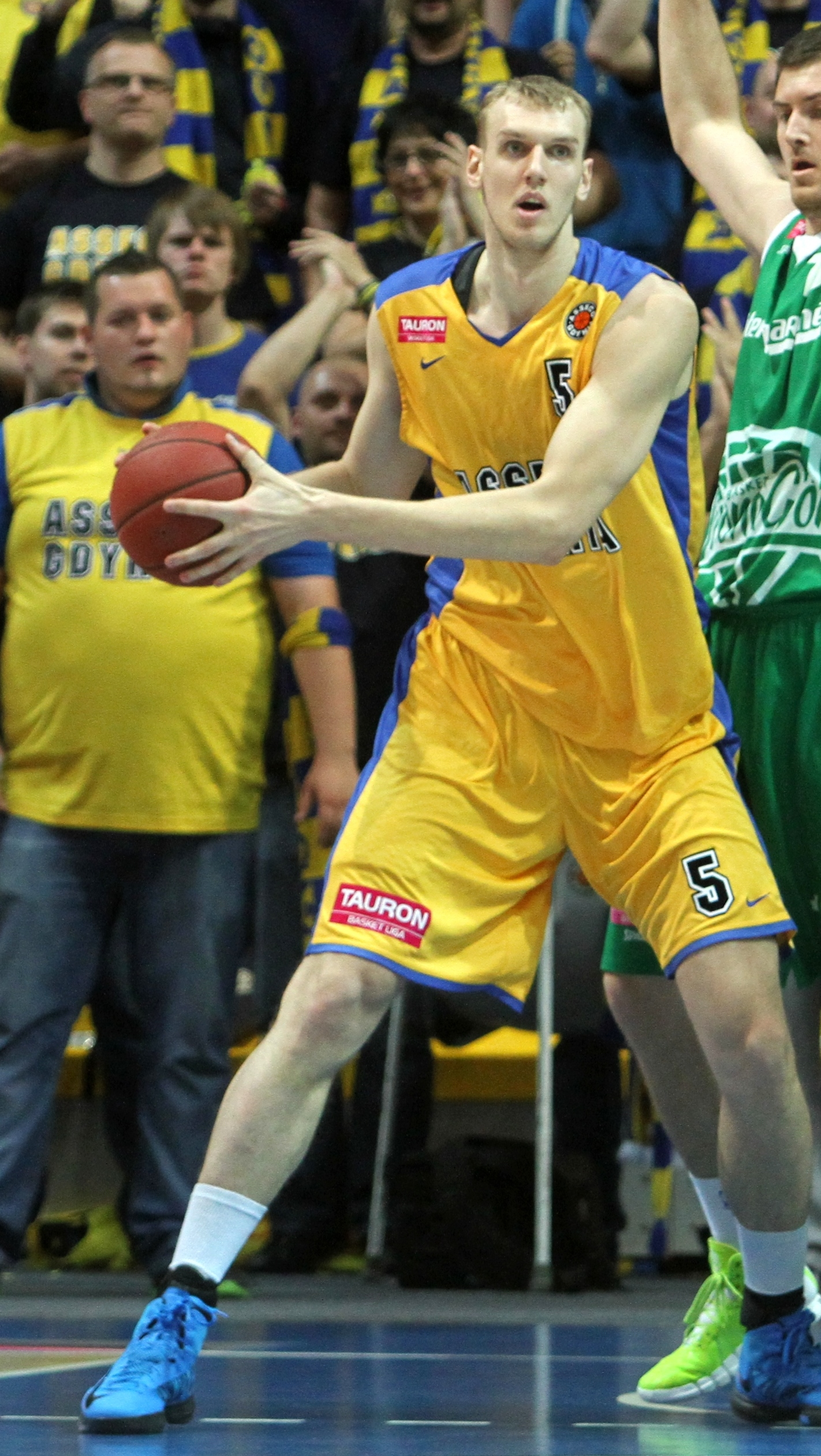
- Galdikas with Asseco Gdynia in 2014

Personal information
- Born: 4 September 1988 (age 38) Kaunas, Lithuanian SSR, Soviet Union
- Listed height: 7 ft 2 in (2.18 m)
- Listed weight: 241 lb (109 kg)

Career information
- NBA draft: 2010: undrafted
- Playing career: 2009–2017
- Position: Center
- Number: 5

Career history
- 2006–2007: Žalgiris-Arvydas Sabonis school
- 2009–2010: KM-Magnus Vilnius
- 2010–2011: Puntukas Anykščiai
- 2012–2013: Šiauliai
- 2013–2015: Asseco Gdynia
- 2015–2016: Gran Canaria
- 2016: →Wilki Morskie Szczecin
- 2016–2017: Juventus Utena
- 2017: Prienai–Birštonas

Career highlights
- Lithuanian League blocks leader (2017)

Ovidijus Galdikas (born 4 September 1988) is a Lithuanian former professional basketball player.

== Career ==
Galdikas spent 2006-07 training with the Žalgiris-Arvydas Sabonis school but, after suffering a broken arm, he stopped playing basketball at the behest of his mother and spent the next two years working various menial jobs to support his family.

In around 2009, basketball agent Šarūnas Broga (his current agent) and Klemensas Patiejūnas (a Lithuanian basketball player who was playing in France at that time) started hearing stories of a 7 footer in Kaunas who wasn't playing basketball anywhere. Having found Galdikas, they realised that he wasn't yet ready for professional basketball and started working with him. Klemensas took him to France and, upon his return, Galdikas joined Vilnius KM-Magnus (a third-tier club) during the 2009–10 season, where he averaged 21.2 points, 10.9 rebounds. Next season, he moved up a tier to Anykščiai Puntukas and averaged 14.8 points, 9.3 rebounds and 3 blocks.

He missed the 2011–12 season due to injuries. In 2012 he joined Šiauliai. However, the team didn't give him much playing time as they also had the more experienced Papa Dia.

According to reports, the Knicks have been watching him for over 3 years, and Knicks' president visited Šiauliai during the 2012–13 season to meet with Galdikas and watch him play, however, Galdikas was injured at the time). In August 2013, the New York Knicks again showed interest in Galdikas, describing him as a 'diamond in the rough' and the 'third best Lithuanian center after Jonas Valančiūnas and Donatas Motiejūnas.

During the 2014–2015 season he was scoring 11.2 points (74% FG), grabbing 10 rebounds and blocking 2.6 shots, while representing Asseco Gdynia club in Poland. Following it, he decided to participate in the NBA Summer League to seek his dream of representing NBA club. He represented the New York Knicks in the NBA Summer League.

On 29 August 2015, Galdikas signed with the Spanish team Herbalife Gran Canaria. He debuted by scoring 10 points, grabbing 4 rebounds and blocking 6 shots.

On 19 February 2016, Gran Canaria announced Galdikas would be loaned to Polish club Wilki Morskie Szczecin until the end of the 2015–16 PLK season. Gran Canaria later released Galdikas. After a successful season with Juventus Utena in 2016–17, Galdikas signed with Vytautas Prienai–Birštonas, but was released after a few games in September 2017. In October 2017, he retired from professional basketball for health reasons.

== Personal life ==
Prior to becoming famous for his actions on the court, Galdikas appeared in the Lithuanian media because of his relationship with and subsequent marriage to an underage girl to avoid facing charges for statutory rape. He was 19 at the time and his wife, at 15 years old, was the youngest bride in Lithuania in 2008.
