= Pablo Aguilar (basketball) =

Spanish basketball player (born 1989)

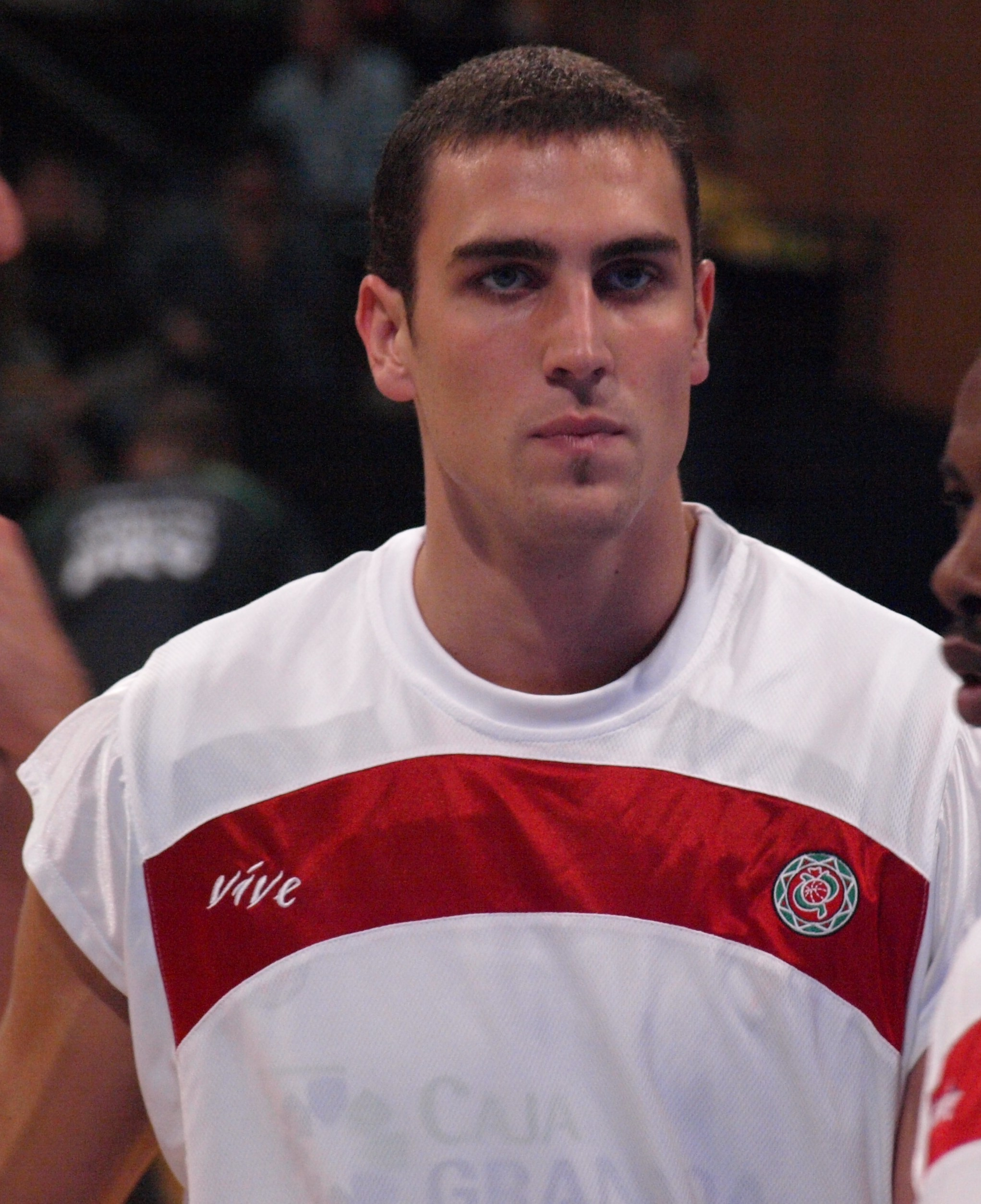
- Aguilar with Granada in 2008

Free agent
- Position: Power forward

Personal information
- Born: 9 February 1989 (age 37) Granada, Spain
- Listed height: 6 ft 9 in (2.06 m)
- Listed weight: 235 lb (107 kg)

Career information
- NBA draft: 2011: undrafted
- Playing career: 2006–present

Career history
- 2005–2008: Real Madrid
- 2008–2010: Granada
- 2010–2013: Zaragoza
- 2013–2015: Valencia
- 2015–2018: Gran Canaria
- 2018: Cedevita
- 2018–2019: Pallacanestro Reggiana
- 2020: Kawasaki Brave Thunders
- 2020: Burgos
- 2020–2022: Kawasaki Brave Thunders
- 2022–2023: Nagasaki Velca
- 2023–2025: Rizing Zephyr Fukuoka

Career highlights
- 2× EuroCup champion (2007, 2014); Spanish League champion (2007); Spanish Supercup winner (2016)
Medals
Men's basketball
Representing Spain
EuroBasket
Bronze medal – third place	2013 Slovenia
Gold medal – first place	2015 France–Croatia–Germany–Latvia
FIBA Europe Under-18 Championship
Bronze medal – third place	2006 Greece	U-18 Team

Pablo Aguilar Bermúdez (born 9 February 1989) is a Spanish professional basketball player who last played for the Rizing Zephyr Fukuoka of the B.League. He plays the power forward position.

== Professional career ==
Aguilar signed with the Spanish League club CAI Zaragoza in 2011. In July 2013, he signed a three-year deal with Valencia BC.

On 1 August 2018 he signed with Croatian club Cedevita. On 10 November 2018 he was released by Cedevita. The same day he signed a deal with Italian club Pallacanestro Reggiana. On 17 July 2019, Aguilar signed a two-year deal with Spanish club Iberostar Tenerife. On 8 October, he has left Iberostar Tenerife due to physical problems.

On 23 June 2023, Aguilar signed with the Rizing Zephyr Fukuoka of the B.League. On 21 March 2025, his contract was terminated.

== Spain national team ==
Aguilar has also been a member of the senior men's Spain national team. He played at EuroBasket 2013, where he won a bronze medal, and at EuroBasket 2015, where he won a gold medal.
