= Eulis Báez =

Dominican basketball player

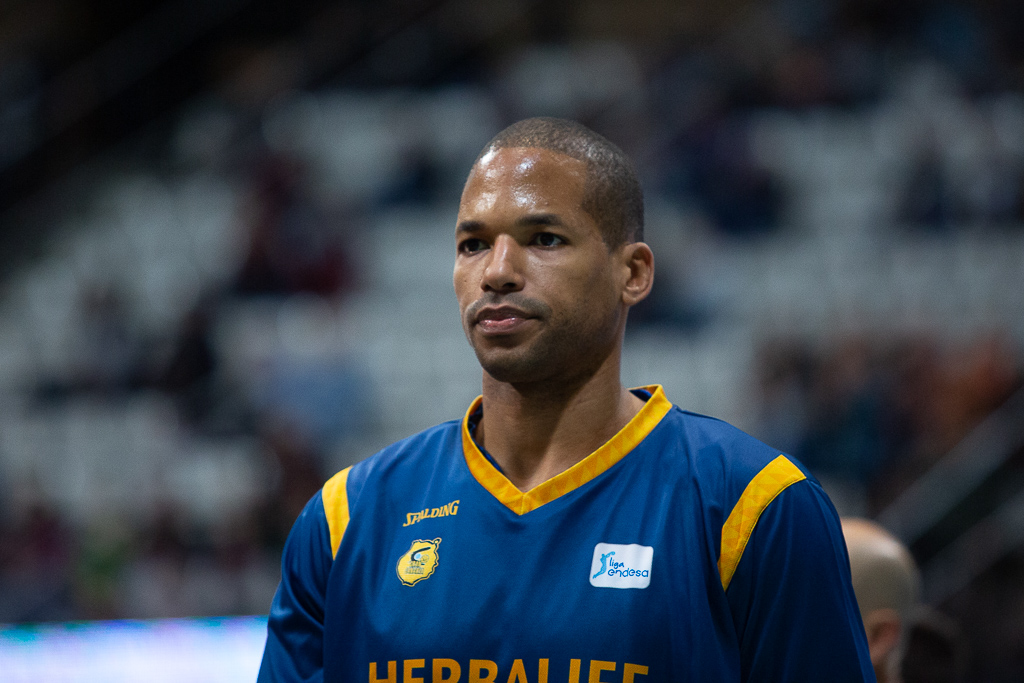
- Baez in 2019

Personal information
- Born: March 18, 1982 (age 44) Santo Domingo, Dominican Republic
- Listed height: 6 ft 7 in (2.01 m)
- Listed weight: 245 lb (111 kg)

Career information
- College: Florida International (2002–2003); Southeastern CC (2003–2004); Western Illinois (2004–2005)
- NBA draft: 2005: undrafted
- Playing career: 2005–present
- Position: Power forward

Career history
- 2005–2008: Vic
- 2008: Indios de San Francisco de Macorís
- 2008–2009: León
- 2009–2011: Valladolid
- 2011: Leones de Santo Domingo
- 2011–2012: Joventut
- 2012–2019: Gran Canaria
- 2019–2021: Manresa
- 2021–2022: Coosur Real Betis
- 2022: Leones de Santo Domingo
- 2022–2023: Coosur Real Betis

Career highlights
- Summit League Newcomer of the Year (2005)
Medals
Men's basketball
Representing Dominican Republic
FIBA AmeriCup
| Bronze medal – third place | 2011 Mar del Plata |

Eulis Báez (born March 18, 1982) is a former Dominican professional basketball player. He competes internationally with the Dominican Republic national basketball team, and has appeared in various events, including the 2011 FIBA Americas Championship and 2014 FIBA Basketball World Cup. Báez played college basketball with three college teams spanning from 2002 to 2005: Florida International, Southeastern Iowa Community College, and Western Illinois.

Báez spent the 2020–21 season with Manresa, averaging 6.5 points and 2.9 rebounds per game. On November 29, 2021, he signed with Real Betis.
