= Sasu Salin =

Finnish basketball player (born 1991)

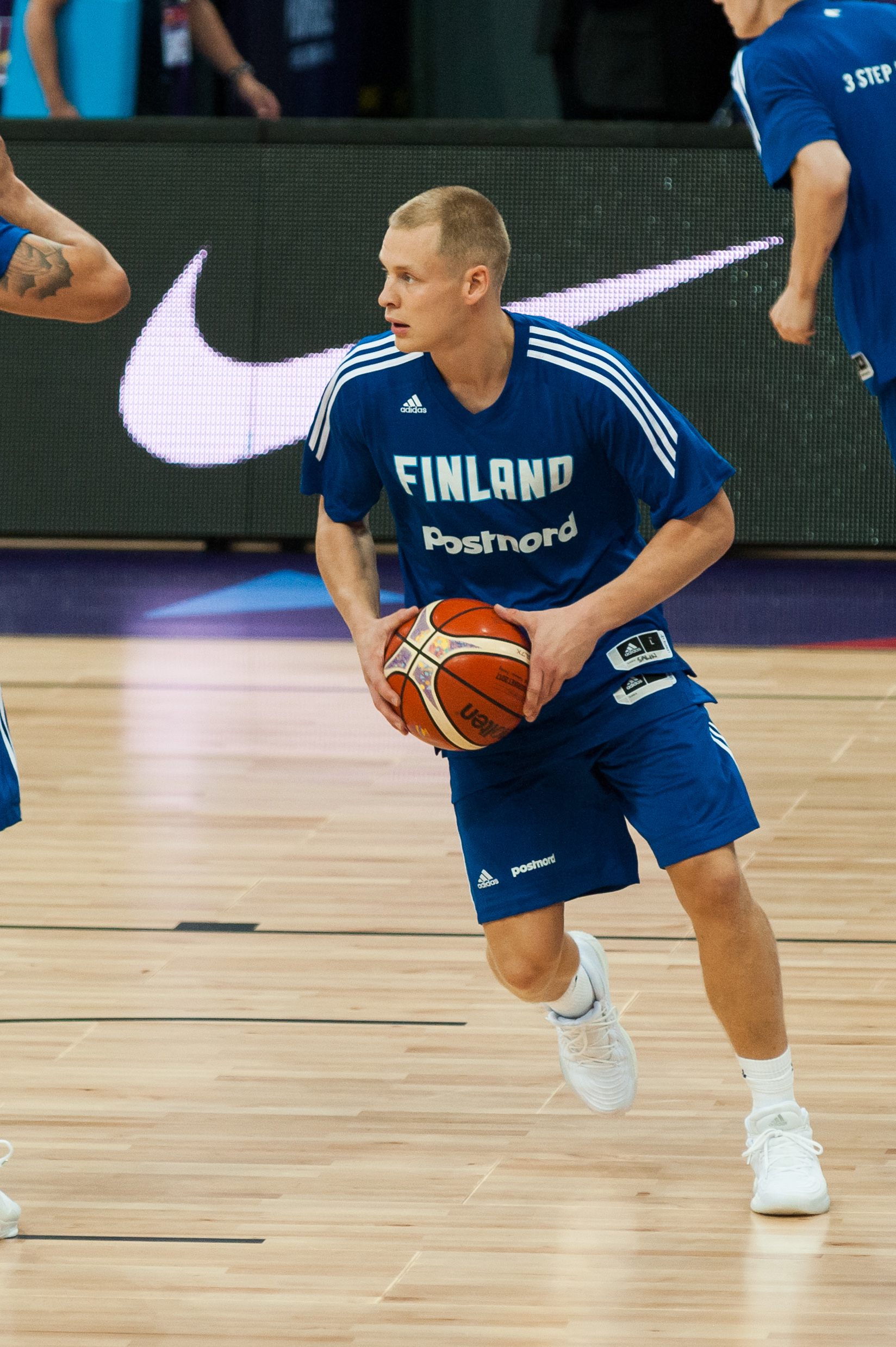
- Salin with Finland during EuroBasket 2017

No. 9 – CB Estudiantes
- Position: Shooting guard
- League: LEB Oro

Personal information
- Born: June 11, 1991 (age 35) Helsinki, Finland
- Listed height: 6 ft 2.8 in (1.90 m)
- Listed weight: 198 lb (90 kg)

Career information
- NBA draft: 2013: undrafted
- Playing career: 2007–present

Career history
- 2007–2010: Espoon Honka
- 2010–2015: Union Olimpija
- 2015–2017: Gran Canaria
- 2017–2019: Unicaja Malaga
- 2019–2024: Tenerife
- 2024–2025: U-BT Cluj-Napoca
- 2025–present: Estudiantes

Career highlights
- FIBA Champions League champion (2022); 2× FIBA Intercontinental Cup champion (2020, 2023); Romanian League champion (2025); Spanish Supercup winner (2016); Spain Cup champion (2026); 3× Slovenian Cup winner (2011–2013); Finnish Korisliiga champion (2008); Finnish Cup winner (2010)

Sasu Antreas Salin (born June 11, 1991) is a Finnish professional basketball player who plays for Spanish team Estudiantes. Standing at 1.91 m (6 ft 3 in) he plays at the shooting guard position. Salin also captains the Finland national team.

== Professional career ==
=== Espoon Honka ===
Salin started his professional career with Espoon Honka in Finnish Korisliiga in 2007. With Honka, Salin won the Finnish championship in 2008 and the Finnish Cup in 2010.

=== Union Olimpija ===
On August 27, 2010, Salin signed a three-year contract with the Slovenian club Union Olimpija in the EuroLeague. On June 20, 2013, he extended his contract with Olimpija for two more seasons.

=== Gran Canaria ===
In February 2015, he left Olimpija and signed with Spanish Liga ACB and the EuroCup team Herbalife Gran Canaria for the rest of the season. On June 16, 2015, he re-signed with Gran Canaria for one more season.

=== Unicaja Malaga ===
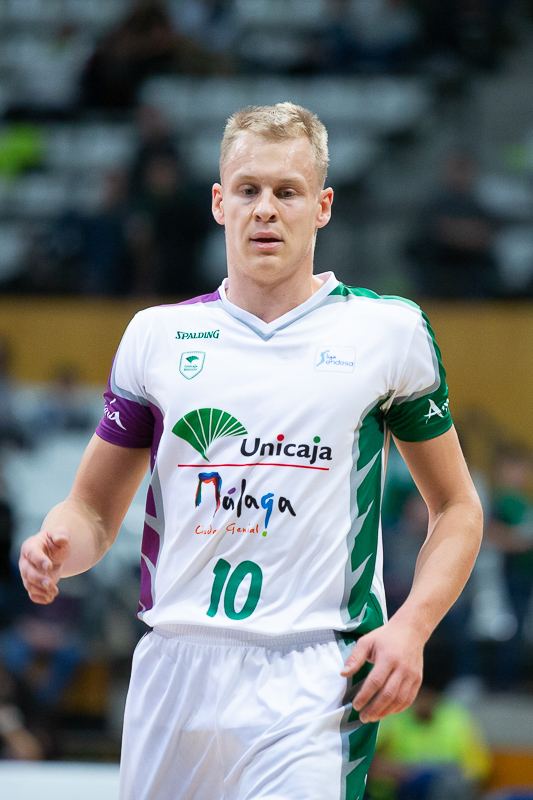
Salin with Unicaja Malaga in 2018

On July 11, 2017, Salin signed a two-year deal with Spanish club Unicaja of the Liga ACB and the EuroLeague.

=== Tenerife ===
On July 12, 2019, Salin signed a two-year deal with Spanish club Tenerife in ACB and the Basketball Champions League. Salin and Tenerife were crowned the Champions League champions in 2022. On 7 July 2023, Salin renewed his contract with Tenerife again, on a one-year deal with an option for the further year.

On 18 October 2023, in the opening match of the 2023–24 Basketball Champions League against Cholet, Salin scored 7/7 three-pointers in only 8 minutes in the second quarter, helping his side to take the lead after being 19 points short, and ultimately to win the game. Salin finished as a top scorer of the game with 25 points (8/9 behind the 3p line).

On 16 December 2023 in a match against Manresa, Salin made his 300th appearance in the Liga ACB. After the 2023–24 season, it was confirmed that Salin would leave Tenerife after spending five seasons with the club.

=== U-BT Cluj-Napoca ===
On 3 August 2024, Salin moved to Romania and signed with U-BT Cluj-Napoca in the Liga Națională and the EuroCup. They went on to win the Romanian domestic league championship title.

=== Estudiantes ===
In August 2025, Salin returned to Spain after signing with CB Estudiantes.

== International career ==
At the international stage, Salin has represented Finland national team at the 2014 FIBA World Cup and the 2023 FIBA World Cup. At the European stage, he played in the EuroBasket 2011, EuroBasket 2013, EuroBasket 2015, EuroBasket 2017 and in the EuroBasket 2022.

Salin also played in the 2024 FIBA Olympic qualifying tournament.

In August 2025, Salin played his 150th game for the Finland national team. He captained the team at the EuroBasket 2025, where they historically reached the semi-finals and finished 4th in the tournament.

== Career statistics ==
Legend
GP	Games played	GS	Games started	MPG	Minutes per game
FG%	Field-goal percentage	3P%	3-point field-goal percentage	FT%	Free-throw percentage
RPG	Rebounds per game	APG	Assists per game	SPG	Steals per game
BPG	Blocks per game	PPG	Points per game	PIR	Performance index rating
**Bold**	Career high	*	Led the league

†	Denotes season in which Salin won the Champions League

=== EuroLeague ===
Year	Team	GP	GS	MPG	FG%	3P%	FT%	RPG	APG	SPG	BPG	PPG	PIR
2010–11	Union Olimpija	11	0	5.31	.353	**.333**	.667	.8	.1	0.4	-	1.8	1.0
2011–12	Union Olimpija	10	8	**25.3**	.286	.167	**1.000**	2.0	1.3	.8	.1	4.4	3.4
2012–13	Union Olimpija	9	9	24.2	**.389**	.325	**1.000**	**2.7**	**1.4**	**1.2**	**.2**	**6.3**	**7.9**
2017–18	Unicaja	**28**	**11**	15.6	.318	.305	.722	1.7	1.2	.5	-	5.0	4.2
Career		58	28	16.6	.327	.285	.781	1.7	1.0	.7	.1	4.5	4.1

=== EuroCup ===
Year	Team	GP	GS	MPG	FG%	3P%	FT%	RPG	APG	SPG	BPG	PPG	PIR
2013–14	Union Olimpija	16	4	**26.0**	.344	.340	.854	2.4	1.5	**1.2**	-	10.9	8.4
2014–15	Union Olimpija	9	6	22.4	.397	.419	.800	**3.1**	1.1	.7	-	9.8	**10.7**
2015–16	Gran Canaria	**22**	**17**	22.3	.412	.384	.854	2.7	1.0	.8	-	**11.5**	9.9
2016–17	Gran Canaria	16	13	17.5	**.469**	**.474**	**.955**	1.4	.7	.8	**.1**	9.3	8.6
2018–19	Unicaja	19	8	20.5	.372	.372	.810	2.4	1.2	.4	**.1**	7.1	6.3
2024–25	U-BT Cluj-Napoca	20	11	22.1	.393	.375	.852	2.0	**1.6**	.8	-	8.7	7.9
Career		102	59	21.6	.396	.386	.855	2.3	1.2	0.8	0.0	9.5	8.5

=== FIBA Champions League ===
Year	Team	GP	GS	MPG	FG%	3P%	FT%	RPG	APG	SPG	BPG	PPG
2019–20	Tenerife	18		22.8	.420	.400	.850	1.9	1.4	.7	.0	10.9
2020–21	Tenerife	12		23.2	.464	**.459**	.967	1.5	**2.0**	.3	.0	**12.8**
2021–22†	Tenerife	**19**		**26.6**	**.482**	.454	.765	**2.3**	1.6	1.0	.0	12.6
2022–23	Tenerife	15		20.7	.381	.385	**1.000**	**2.3**	1.3	.7	.0	10.1
2023–24	Tenerife	10		16.9	.382	.420	.750	1.5	1.1	**1.2**	.0	6.9

=== National team ===
Team	Tournament	Pos.	GP	PPG	RPG	APG
Finland	EuroBasket 2011	9th	8	6.6	3.0	0.9
Finland	EuroBasket 2013	9th	8	7.1	5.0	1.6
Finland	2014 FIBA World Cup	22nd	5	6.6	2.6	1.0
Finland	EuroBasket 2015	16th	6	13.2	3.2	1.8
Finland	EuroBasket 2017	11th	6	11.7	5.7	2.0
Finland	EuroBasket 2022	7th	7	12.0	3.1	2.6
Finland	2023 FIBA World Cup	21st	5	9.4	2.0	2.6
Finland	EuroBasket 2025	4th	9	7.7	3.2	2.7
