= 2026 Copa del Rey de Baloncesto =

90th edition of the Spanish Basketball King's Cup

2026 Copa del Rey

Tournament details
- Country: Spain
- City: Valencia
- Venue: Roig Arena
- Dates: 19–22 February 2026
- Teams: 8
- Defending champions: Unicaja

Final positions
- Champions: Kosner Baskonia (7th title)
- Runners-up: Real Madrid
- Semifinalists: Valencia Basket; Barça

Tournament statistics
- Matches played: 7
- Attendance: 101,399 (14,486 per match)

Awards
- MVP: Trent Forrest (Kosner Baskonia)

The 2026 Copa del Rey de Baloncesto was the 90th edition of the Spanish Basketball King's Cup. It was managed by the ACB and was held in Valencia, in the Roig Arena in February 2026.

Unicaja were the defending champions, which were thrashed by Real Madrid in quarterfinals, which were stunned in the final by Kosner Baskonia that achieved their seventh cup after 17 years since the last title in its favourite tournament.

All times are in Central European Time (UTC+01:00).

== Venue ==
On 11 March 2025, ACB selected and announced Valencia to host the Copa del Rey in February 2026. The plot is located between the streets Ángel Villena, Bomber Ramón Duart and Antonio Ferrandis, next to La Fonteta; it was used as a parking lot for the attendants to the former venue and L'Alqueria. The arena was funded by Juan Roig, who created the company Licampa 1617 S.L. to carry out the project. After a fifty-year concession, the facilities will revert to the municipality. It will host matches for the 2028 European Men's Handball Championship. The venue has a capacity of 15,600 for basketball fixtures, of 18,600 for 180° concerts and of 20,000 for 360° shows. It also features around 1,300 parking spaces. Building works started on 29 June 2020 and ended on 5 September 2025. In 2020 the arena was expected to open in 2023, but was later delayed to 2025, and it was finally opened on 6 September 2025. It replaced La Fonteta as the main venue of Valencia Basket.

Valencia	2026 Copa del Rey de Baloncesto (Spain)
Roig Arena	2026 Copa del Rey de Baloncesto (Spain)
Capacity: 15,600	2026 Copa del Rey de Baloncesto (Spain)

== Qualified teams ==
The top seven ranking teams after the first half of the 2025–26 ACB regular season qualified to the tournament. As Valencia Basket, host team, finished between the seven first teams, the eighth qualified entered in the Copa del Rey.

Pos	Team	Pld	W	L	PF	PA	PD	Qualification
1	Real Madrid	17	15	2	1566	1402	+164	Qualification to the tournament
2	Valencia Basket (H)	17	13	4	1608	1388	+220	Qualification to the tournament
3	Barça	17	12	5	1496	1365	+131	Qualification to the tournament
4	Kosner Baskonia	17	12	5	1605	1495	+110	Qualification to the tournament
5	UCAM Murcia	17	11	6	1492	1389	+103	Qualification to the tournament
6	Unicaja	17	11	6	1486	1429	+57	Qualification to the tournament
7	La Laguna Tenerife	17	10	7	1479	1425	+54	Qualification to the tournament
8	Asisa Joventut	17	10	7	1429	1386	+43	Qualification to the tournament

Source: ACB
Rules for classification: 1) Win–loss record; 2) Point difference; 3) Points scored; 4) Sum of quotients of points scored
(H) Hosts

== Draw ==
The draw was held on 26 January 2026 in Palau de les Arts Reina Sofía in Valencia, Spain. The top four ranking teams act as seeded teams in the draw of the quarterfinals. For its part, Real Madrid as the top ranked team played its quarterfinal match on Thursday. Two Valencian sports stars act as innocent hands: the former Liga ACB player Víctor Claver and the former professional tennis player David Ferrer who was ranked world No. 3 in men's singles by the Association of Tennis Professionals (ATP) in July 2013 and won 27 ATP Tour singles titles.

Seeded teams Team Real Madrid Valencia Basket Barça Kosner Baskonia (Note: At the time of the draw, the last seeded team was dependent on the result of the postponed match between Dreamland Gran Canaria and Kosner Baskonia. Specifically, Kosner Baskonia would be the seeded team if they would win in Gran Canaria, while UCAM Murcia would be the seeded team if Baskonia would lose.)	Unseeded teans Team UCAM Murcia (Note: At the time of the draw, the last unseeded team was dependent on the result of the postponed match between Dreamland Gran Canaria and Kosner Baskonia. Specifically, this spot would be for UCAM Murcia if Kosner Baskonia would beat Dreamland Gran Canaria, and for Baskonia if they would lose in Gran Canaria.) Unicaja La Laguna Tenerife Joventut Badalona

== Bracket ==
Quarterfinals; 19–20 February
Valencia Basket	95
Asisa Joventut	84
Real Madrid	100
Unicaja	70
Barça	91
UCAM Murcia	85
Kosner Baskonia	91
La Laguna Tenerife	81

Semifinals; 21 February
Valencia Basket	106
Real Madrid	108
Barça	67
Kosner Baskonia	70

Final; 22 February
Real Madrid	89
Kosner Baskonia	100

== Quarterfinals ==
=== Valencia Basket vs. Asisa Joventut ===
Host team Valencia Basket kicked off their Copa del Rey campaign in style, with a 95–84 win over Asisa Joventut, which never gave up. Talented as ever, but with the added benefit of maturity, hard work, and consistency this season, the Dominican player Jean Montero shook off Valencia Basket's nerves on Thursday in their Copa del Rey opener, guiding them to the semifinals and blocking Asisa Joventut's path. Joventut fought hard, making the victory difficult until the final quarter. The Dominican guard, who finished with 19 points, 4 rebounds, and 3 assists as the home team's top performer, carried his team on his back during moments of doubt for Valencia and, along with a sharp–shooting Brancou Badio, neutralized Joventut's last-ditch effort to force a close finish

In his return to the Copa del Rey after a 15–year absence, Ricky Rubio was the driving force behind Joventut, very well supported by Cameron Hunt. The Spanish point guard distributed the ball, rebounded and scored, but he did so mainly from the free throw line and his 2/12 field goal percentage weighed heavily.

19 February 2026	Valencia Basket	95–84	Asisa Joventut	Valencia
18:00	Scoring by quarter: 22–23, 24–11, 21–26, 28–24
	Pts: Badio 21; Rebs: Key, Reuvers 7 Asts: Thompson, Montero 3 PIR: Montero 23	Boxscore	Pts: Hunt 26; Rebs: Birgander 9 Asts: Rubio 8 PIR: Hunt 25	Arena: Roig Arena; Attendance: 13,376; Referees: Emilio Pérez Pizarro, Martín Caballero, Alfonso Olivares

Regular season fixtures

26 October 2025

Boxscore

Valencia Basket	102–90	Joventut Badalona

Roig Arena, Valencia

8 February 2026

Boxscore

Asisa Joventut	90–87	Valencia Basket

Palau Municipal d'Esports, Badalona

This was the third cup meeting between these two teams, with each team winning one out of the first two meetings.

Previous cup series
Tied 1–1 in all-time cup series

2 February 1998

Boxscore

Pamesa Valencia	89–75	Festina Joventut

1998 final

8 February 2008

Boxscore

DKV Joventut	84–59	Pamesa Valencia

2008 quarterfinals

=== Real Madrid vs. Unicaja ===
Real Madrid dominated from start to finish against Unicaja (100–70), extending their winning streak to 13 consecutive quarterfinal series. Lyles (16 points, 23 PIR) and Maledon (13 points, 21 PIR) avenged Los Blancos defeat in the previous final. With an imposing start and overwhelming control in the paint, Real Madrid intimidated Unicaja from beginning to end of the match. Unicaja never found an answer and was ultimately overwhelmed by Sergio Scariolo's team, which exacted revenge for the 2025 final and will face Valencia Basket in the semifinals on Saturday. First Edy Tavares and then Usman Garuba intimidated the Andalusian team's big men, the former with his size and the latter with his intensity. Unicaja lost all confidence, failed to tighten up their defense, and allowed the Madrid team to shoot with dazzling percentages until they finished the match before halftime.

19 February 2026	Real Madrid	100–70	Unicaja	Valencia
21:00	Scoring by quarter: 28–12, 22–16, 23–16, 27–26
	Pts: Lyles 16; Rebs: Lyles 6 Asts: Feliz, Maledon 4 PIR: Lyles 23	Boxscore	Pts: Webb 18; Rebs: Webb 7 Asts: Balcerowski 4 PIR: Webb 17	Arena: Roig Arena; Attendance: 14,062; Referees: Carlos Peruga, Arnau Padrós, Jorge Martínez

Regular season fixtures

28 December 2025

Boxscore

Real Madrid	91–82	Unicaja

Movistar Arena, Madrid

15 February 2026

Boxscore

Unicaja	92–96	Real Madrid

Martín Carpena, Málaga

This was the seventh cup meeting between these two teams, with each team winning three out of the first six meetings.

Previous cup series
Tied 3–3 in all-time cup series

16 March 2001

Boxscore

Unicaja	70–73	Real Madrid

2001 quarterfinals

20 February 2005

Boxscore

Unicaja	80–76	Real Madrid

2005 final

15 February 2018

Boxscore

Real Madrid	89–84	Unicaja

2018 quarterfinals

16 February 2020

Boxscore

Unicaja	68–95	Real Madrid

2020 final

18 February 2023

Boxscore

Real Madrid	82–93	Unicaja

2023 semifinals

16 February 2025

Boxscore

Unicaja	93–79	Real Madrid

2025 final

=== Kosner Baskonia vs. La Laguna Tenerife ===
Kosner Baskonia defeated La Laguna Tenerife 91–81 in a match that they were always ahead, although they lost a 16–point lead against a Canarian team that managed to tie the game but was unable to complete their comeback. The Basque team, whose top scorer was Trent Forrest with 21 points, returns to the semifinals after a two-year absence from the tournament.

20 February 2026	Kosner Baskonia	91–81	La Laguna Tenerife	Valencia
18:00	Scoring by quarter: 25–18, 20–15, 19–27, 27–21
	Pts: Forrest 21; Rebs: Diakite 6 Asts: Omoruyi 7 PIR: Forrest 28	Boxscore	Pts: Fitipaldo, Scrubb 14; Rebs: Doornekamp 9 Asts: Fitipaldo 5 PIR: Scrubb 14	Arena: Roig Arena; Attendance: 13,214; Referees: Óscar Perea, Jordi Aliaga, Francisco Araña

Regular season fixtures

2 November 2025

Boxscore

Baskonia	89–79	La Laguna Tenerife

Buesa Arena, Vitoria-Gasteiz

1 February 2026

Boxscore

La Laguna Tenerife	89–85	Kosner Baskonia

Santiago Martín, San Cristóbal de La Laguna

This was the second cup meeting between these two teams, with Kosner Baskonia winning the previous meeting.

Previous cup series
Baskonia leads 1–0 in all-time cup series

16 February 2017

Boxscore

Baskonia	90–81	Iberostar Tenerife

2017 quarterfinals

=== Barça vs. UCAM Murcia ===
Barça waited for their moment and defeated a relentless UCAM Murcia (91–85) to qualify for the semifinals. Kevin Punter returned on Friday, two weeks after suffering a muscle injury that threatened to sideline him for a month. He led Barça to a semifinal where they will face Kosner Baskonia and ended the dream of a strong UCAM Murcia team, which dominated the last quarterfinal match of the tournament in Valencia for much of the game. Led by Dylan Ennis and Devontae Cacok, and with all their players fully engaged, the team from Murcia seemed to have the game under control, holding a six-point lead with eight minutes remaining. But then Punter, who had already neutralized an initial Murcia surge, reappeared to cap off his performance: 20 points in 20 minutes.

20 February 2026	Barça	91–85	UCAM Murcia	Valencia
21:00	Scoring by quarter: 20–19, 22–25, 18–18, 31–23
	Pts: Punter 20; Rebs: Hernangómez 5 Asts: Laprovíttola 9 PIR: Laprovíttola 19	Boxscore	Pts: Ennis 25; Rebs: Cacok 10; Asts: Ennis, DeJulius 4 PIR: Cacok 24	Arena: Roig Arena; Attendance: 15,124; Referees: Antonio Conde, Fernando Calatrava, Alberto Sánchez Sixto

Regular season fixtures

2 November 2025

Boxscore

Barça	78–81	UCAM Murcia

Palau Blaugrana, Barcelona

1 February 2026

Boxscore

UCAM Murcia	84–83	Barça

Palacio de Deportes, Murcia

This was the second cup meeting between these two teams, with Barça winning the previous meeting.

Previous cup series
Barça leads 1–0 in all-time cup series

19 February 2022

Boxscore

Barça	103–90	UCAM Murcia

2022 semifinals

== Semifinals ==
=== Valencia Basket vs. Real Madrid ===
A lethal Mario Hezonja, with two accurate three-pointers in the last minute, ruined the show in which the Dominican Jean Montero, author of 19 points in the last quarter and 26 in total, had put Valencia Basket on the verge of the final of the tournament. Thus, Real Madrid reached the final in the match with the most total points scored (without overtime) in the history of the tournament.

21 February 2026	Valencia Basket	106–108	Real Madrid	Valencia
18:00	Scoring by quarter: 34–16, 20–34, 25–27, 27–31
	Pts: Montero 26; Rebs: Reuvers 5 Asts: Thompson 5 PIR: Montero 27	Boxscore	Pts: Hezonja 25; Rebs: Tavares, Garuba 8 Asts: Maledon 5 PIR: Tavares 24	Arena: Roig Arena; Attendance: 15,221; Referees: Antonio Conde, Jordi Aliaga, Sergio Manuel

Regular season fixture

18 January 2026

Boxscore

Real Madrid	94–79	Valencia Basket

Movistar Arena, Madrid

This was the seventh cup meeting between these two teams, with Real Madrid winning the previous six meetings.

Previous cup series
Real Madrid leads 6–0 in all-time cup series

12 February 2011

Boxscore

Real Madrid	69–59	Power Electronics Valencia

2011 semifinals

19 February 2017

Boxscore

Real Madrid	97–95	Valencia Basket

2017 final

15 February 2020

Boxscore

Real Madrid	91–68	Valencia Basket

2020 semifinals

11 February 2021

Boxscore

Real Madrid	85–74	Valencia Basket

2021 quarterfinals

16 February 2023

Boxscore

Real Madrid	86–85	Valencia Basket

2023 quarterfinals

17 February 2024

Boxscore

Real Madrid	95–76	Valencia Basket

2024 semifinals

=== Barça vs. Kosner Baskonia ===
Kosner Baskonia managed to stay close behind Barça for much of the second semifinal, never letting them pull away on the scoreboard. In the final stretch, they capitalized on Nico Laprovittola's rest to seize control of the game and reach the final of the tournament, held at the Roig Arena in Valencia, for the first time in 17 years, in pursuit of what would be their seventh title. In a match marked by more errors than successes, Kosner Baskonia managed to score several field goals against their opponent and remained calm to prevent Barça from forcing overtime.

21 February 2026	Barça	67–70	Kosner Baskonia	Valencia
21:00	Scoring by quarter: 21–16, 16–22, 21–11, 9–21
	Pts: Laprovíttola, Shengelia 12; Rebs: Shengelia 7 Asts: Laprovíttola 4 PIR: Clyburn 15	Boxscore	Pts: Kurucs 14; Rebs: Luwawu-Cabarrot 7 Asts: Forrest 8 PIR: Forrest 20	Arena: Roig Arena; Attendance: 15,088; Referees: Emilio Pérez Pizarro, Fernando Calatrava, Alfonso Olivares

Regular season fixture

16 November 2025

Boxscore

Barça	91–83	Baskonia

Palau Blaugrana, Barcelona

This was the 16th cup meeting between these two teams, with Barça winning 11 out of the first 15 meetings.

Previous cup series
Barça leads 11–1–3 in all-time cup series

1 April 1979

Boxscore

CD Basconia Sallkon	89–99	FC Barcelona

1979 semifinals first leg

8 April 1979

Boxscore

FC Barcelona	108–84	CD Basconia Sallkon

1979 semifinals second leg

18 October 1988

Boxscore

FC Barcelona	93–82	Taugrés Baskonia

1989 round of 16 first leg

25 October 1988

Boxscore

Taugrés Baskonia	81–81	FC Barcelona

1989 round of 16 second leg

21 February 1991

Boxscore

FC Barcelona	98–79	Taugrés

1991 quarterfinals

4 March 1993

Boxscore

Taugrés Baskonia	78–74	FC Barcelona Banca Catalana

1993 quarterfinals

6 March 1994

Boxscore

FC Barcelona Banca Catalana	86–75	Taugrés

1994 final

17 March 2002

Boxscore

TAU Cerámica	85–83	FC Barcelona

2002 final

23 February 2003

Boxscore

TAU Cerámica	78–84	FC Barcelona

2003 final

21 February 2009

Boxscore

Regal FC Barcelona	77–90	TAU Cerámica

2009 semifinals

12 February 2011

Boxscore

Regal FC Barcelona	92–73	Caja Laboral

2011 semifinals

18 February 2012

Boxscore

FC Barcelona Regal	66–57	Caja Laboral

2012 semifinals

9 February 2013

Boxscore

Caja Laboral	69–80	FC Barcelona Regal

2013 semifinals

16 February 2018

Boxscore

Barcelona Lassa	94–90	Kirolbet Baskonia

2018 quarterfinals

13 February 2021

Boxscore

Barça	77–68	TD Systems Baskonia

2021 semifinals

== Final ==
Kosner Baskonia defeated Real Madrid (100–89) in the final. Timothé Luwawu-Cabarrot, Eugene Omoruyi, and Trent Forrest scored 73 of their team's 100 points, along with late contributions from Markus Howard. Kosner Baskonia became champions 17 years after their last title in this tournament. The team were coached by Paolo Galbiati.

22 February 2026	Real Madrid	89–100	Kosner Baskonia	Valencia
19:00	Scoring by quarter: 26–26, 26–21, 20–20, 17–33
	Pts: Feliz, Hezonja 15; Rebs: Feliz 9 Asts: Campazzo 5 PIR: Campazzo 19	Boxscore	Pts: Luwawu-Cabarrot 28; Rebs: Forrest 9 Asts: Forrest 11; PIR: Forrest 38	Arena: Roig Arena; Attendance: 15,314; Referees: Carlos Peruga, Antonio Conde, Fernando Calatrava

Regular season fixture

12 October 2025

Boxscore

Baskonia	105–100	Real Madrid

Buesa Arena, Vitoria-Gasteiz

This was the 11th cup meeting between these two teams, with Real Madrid winning 7 out of the first 10 meetings.

Previous cup series
Real Madrid leads 7–3 in all-time cup series

10 February 1990

Boxscore

Real Madrid	84–82	Taugrés Baskonia

1990 quarterfinals

6 March 1993

Boxscore

Real Madrid Teka	89–70	Taugrés Baskonia

1993 semifinals

4 March 1995

Boxscore

Real Madrid	79–86	Taugrés

1995 semifinals

31 January 1999

Boxscore

Real Madrid Teka	74–78	TAU Cerámica

1999 semifinals

19 February 2005

Boxscore

TAU Cerámica	77–80	Real Madrid

2005 semifinals

18 February 2006

Boxscore

Real Madrid	75–87	TAU Cerámica

2006 semifinals

10 February 2007

Boxscore

TAU Cerámica	72–74	Real Madrid

2007 semifinals

20 February 2010

Boxscore

Caja Laboral	50–78	Real Madrid

2010 semifinals

20 February 2016

Boxscore

Laboral Kutxa Baskonia	80–86	Real Madrid

2016 semifinals

18 February 2017

Boxscore

Baskonia	99–103 (OT)	Real Madrid

2017 semifinals

2026 Copa del Rey champion
Kosner Baskonia
7th title

== Statistical leaders ==
=== Performance index rating ===
Pos	Player	Club	PIR
1	(United States) Trent Forrest	Kosner Baskonia	28.7
2	(Dominican Republic) Jean Montero	Valencia Basket	25.0
3	(Cape Verde) Edy Tavares	Real Madrid	17.7
4	(France) Timothé Luwawu-Cabarrot	Kosner Baskonia	17.3
5	(Argentina) Facundo Campazzo	Real Madrid	16.7

=== Points ===
Pos	Player	Club	PPG
1	(Dominican Republic) Jean Montero	Valencia Basket	22.5
2	(France) Timothé Luwawu-Cabarrot	Kosner Baskonia	18.3
3	(United States) Trent Forrest	Kosner Baskonia	17.7
4	(Croatia) Mario Hezonja	Real Madrid	17.3
5	(Senegal) Brancou Badio	Valencia Basket	15.5

=== Rebounds ===
Pos	Player	Club	RPG
1	(Hungary) Nate Reuvers	Valencia Basket	6.0
2	(Cape Verde) Edy Tavares	Real Madrid	6.0
3	(United States) Trent Forrest	Kosner Baskonia	6.0
4	(France) Timothé Luwawu-Cabarrot	Kosner Baskonia	5.7
5	(United States) Braxton Key	Valencia Basket	5.5

=== Assists ===
Pos	Player	Club	APG
1	(United States) Trent Forrest	Kosner Baskonia	7.3
2	(Argentina) Nicolás Laprovíttola	Barça	6.5
3	(Italy) Darius Thompson	Valencia Basket	4.0
4	(Nigeria) Eugene Omoruyi	Kosner Baskonia	4.0
5	(France) Théo Maledon	Real Madrid	4.0

Source: ACB

== Awards ==
=== MVP ===
Pos.	Player	Team
PG	(United States) Trent Forrest	Kosner Baskonia
