= 2025 Copa del Rey de Baloncesto =

89th edition of the Spanish Basketball King's Cup

2025 Copa del Rey

Tournament details
- Country: Spain
- City: Las Palmas
- Venue: Gran Canaria Arena
- Dates: 13–16 February 2025
- Teams: 8
- Defending champions: Real Madrid

Final positions
- Champions: Unicaja (3rd title)
- Runners-up: Real Madrid
- Semifinalists: La Laguna Tenerife; Dreamland Gran Canaria

Tournament statistics
- Matches played: 7
- Attendance: 65,742 (9,392 per match)

Awards
- MVP: Kendrick Perry (Unicaja)

The 2025 Copa del Rey de Baloncesto was the 89th edition of the Spanish Basketball King's Cup. It was managed by the ACB and was held in Las Palmas, in the Gran Canaria Arena in February 2025.

Real Madrid was the defending champion, which was overcame in the final by Unicaja, which achieved their third cup, after those achieved in 2005 and 2023. With this title, the team from Málaga conquered their third title consecutive of the season after the super cup and the Intercontinental Cup.

All times are in Central European Time (UTC+01:00).

== Venue ==
On June 3, 2024, ACB selected and announced Las Palmas to host the Copa del Rey in February 2025. The arena, opened in 2014 by then Spanish prime minister Mariano Rajoy, has a capacity of 9,870 spectators and is the home arena of Dreamland Gran Canaria that was the host team of the tournament. The first game in Gran Canaria Arena was the 28th regular season round of the 2013–14 ACB season between Herbalife Gran Canaria and FC Barcelona, played on 1 May 2014. The arena was built with the aim of hosting one of the groups of the preliminary round of the 2014 FIBA Basketball World Cup. It hosted previously the Copa del Rey in 2015 and 2018, and the Supercopa Endesa in 2017.

Las Palmas	2025 Copa del Rey de Baloncesto (Canary Islands)
Gran Canaria Arena	2025 Copa del Rey de Baloncesto (Canary Islands)
Capacity: 9,870	2025 Copa del Rey de Baloncesto (Canary Islands)

== Qualified teams ==
The top seven ranking teams after the first half of the 2024–25 ACB regular season qualified to the tournament. As Dreamland Gran Canaria, host team, finished between the seven first teams, the eighth qualified entered the Copa del Rey.

Pos	Team	Pld	W	L	PF	PA	PD	Qualification
1	Unicaja	17	14	3	1501	1401	+100	Qualification to the tournament
2	Real Madrid	17	13	4	1497	1324	+173	Qualification to the tournament
3	Valencia Basket	17	13	4	1643	1472	+171	Qualification to the tournament
4	La Laguna Tenerife	17	12	5	1500	1416	+84	Qualification to the tournament
5	Joventut Badalona	17	11	6	1432	1384	+48	Qualification to the tournament
6	Baxi Manresa	17	10	7	1448	1377	+71	Qualification to the tournament
7	Dreamland Gran Canaria (H)	17	10	7	1411	1383	+28	Qualification to the tournament
8	Barça	17	9	8	1510	1446	+64	Qualification to the tournament

Updated to match(es) played on 19 January 2025. Source: ACB
Rules for classification: 1) Win–loss record; 2) Point difference; 3) Points scored; 4) Sum of quotients of points scored
(H) Hosts

== Draw ==
The draw was held on 21 January 2025 in Auditorio Alfredo Kraus in Las Palmas, Spain. The top four ranking teams act as seeded teams in the draw of the quarterfinals. For its part, Unicaja as the top ranked team will play its quarterfinal match on Thursday. Two Canarian sports stars act as innocent hands: the former basketball player Leonor Rodríguez, who recently announced her retirement from professional basketball, and the former footballer Juan Carlos Valerón.

Seeded teams Team Unicaja Real Madrid Valencia Basket La Laguna Tenerife	Unseeded teams Team Joventut Badalona Baxi Manresa Dreamland Gran Canaria Barça

== Bracket ==
Quarterfinals; 13–14 February
Unicaja	100
Joventut Badalona	83
La Laguna Tenerife	91
Barça	86
Dreamland Gran Canaria	79
Valencia Basket	65
Real Madrid	92
Baxi Manresa	69

Semifinals; 15 February
Unicaja	90
La Laguna Tenerife	83
Dreamland Gran Canaria	63
Real Madrid	80

Final; 16 February
Unicaja	93
Real Madrid	79

== Quarterfinals ==
=== Unicaja vs. Joventut Badalona ===
Unicaja's physical superiority and choral game demolished Joventut's hopes in the quarterfinals, which held in during the first half, but was unable to respond to a 31–19 run in the third quarter at the Gran Canaria Arena. The temporary absence of Sam Dekker, which was the top scorer of the match with 23 points, was decisive. He missed the last six minutes of the third quarter after receiving an elbow from Dylan Osetkowski in the fight for a rebound. The team from Málaga, which was more aggressive in defense with 12 steals and more strength solid on the rebound, took advantage of this moment to seal the victory with the outstanding contribution of Kendrick Perry (12 points), Tyson Pérez (14 points), Osetkowski (18 points) and Kameron Taylor (14 points).

Unicaja performed 28 assists beating the record of assists in the tournament history.

13 February 2025	Unicaja	100–83	Joventut Badalona	Las Palmas
18:30	Scoring by quarter: 21–16, 21–26, 31–19, 27–22
	Pts: Osetkowski 18; Rebs: Osetkowski 7 Asts: Perry 9 PIR: Taylor 23	Boxscore	Pts: Dekker 23; Rebs: Hanga 5 Asts: Robertson, Tomić 3 PIR: Dekker 22	Arena: Gran Canaria Arena; Attendance: 8,784; Referees: Juan Carlos García González, Martín Caballero, Rafael Serrano

Regular season fixture

9 November 2024

Boxscore

Joventut Badalona	75–79	Unicaja

Palau Municipal d'Esports, Badalona

This was the second cup meeting between these two teams, with Unicaja winning the previous meeting.

Previous cup series
Unicaja leads 1–0 in all-time cup series

21 February 2003

Boxscore

Unicaja	77–75	DKV Joventut

2003 quarterfinals

=== La Laguna Tenerife vs. Barça ===
Marcelo Huertas, who at 41 years, 8 months and 16 days became the oldest player to play in a Copa del Rey match, led his team's comeback to eliminate Barça and qualify for semifinal against Unicaja at the Gran Canaria Arena. The Brazilian performed 6 assists and 22 points, of which 12 points were scored in a final quarter of undisputed Canarian dominance (25–13), against a Catalan team that broke the record for scoring in a first quarter of the tournament (23–33), but faded after the break, weighed down by the injury of Kevin Punter in the third quarter despite the contribution of Tomáš Satoranský (17 points). It was the triumph of perseverance and faith for La Laguna Tenerife, which never gave up despite fighting the entire match against them and, cheered on by the crowd, completed the comeback under the management of Huertas, who was well supported by Fran Guerra (14 points).

13 February 2025	La Laguna Tenerife	91–86	Barça	Las Palmas
21:30	Scoring by quarter: 23–33, 24–21, 19–19, 25–13
	Pts: Huertas 22; Rebs: Huertas 6 Asts: Fitipaldo 7 PIR: Guerra 31	Boxscore	Pts: Satoranský 17; Rebs: Fall, Parra 6 Asts: Satoranský 7 PIR: Satoranský 20	Arena: Gran Canaria Arena; Attendance: 9,152; Referees: Emilio Pérez Pizarro, Carlos Cortés, Iyán González

Regular season fixture

13 October 2024

Boxscore

La Laguna Tenerife	91–95	Barça

Santiago Martín, San Cristóbal de La Laguna

This was the fourth cup meeting between these two teams, with Barça winning the previous three meetings.

Previous cup series
Barça leads 3–0 in all-time cup series

7 February 2014

Boxscore

FC Barcelona	102–60	Iberostar Tenerife

2014 quarterfinals

16 February 2019

Boxscore

Barça Lassa	92–86	Iberostar Tenerife

2019 semifinals

17 February 2024

Boxscore

Barça	108–76	Lenovo Tenerife

2024 semifinals

=== Real Madrid vs. Baxi Manresa ===
Real Madrid began with the aim to win back the Copa del Rey title with a clear win in the quarterfinals against Baxi Manresa, which trailed on the scoreboard from the second half onwards and were unable to display their dynamic style of play at any time. The team coached by Chus Mateo, winner of the tournament in seven of the last 13 editions and finalist in 10 of the 11 most recent seasons, took over the second quarter with a partial score of 23-8, supported by the intimidation of Serge Ibaka and the points of Mario Hezonja, which finished as the top scorer of the match with 24 points. The team coached by Diego Ocampo, with lack of success at the three-pointer (4/26) and were unable to show its high pace of play, hinted at a slight improvement after the halftime, which was stopped by four consecutive three-pointers from Hezonja and Sergio Llull (13 points), thus sealing a solvent win to Los Blancos.

14 February 2025	Real Madrid	92–69	Baxi Manresa	Las Palmas
18:30	Scoring by quarter: 22–22, 21–8, 20–19, 29–20
	Pts: Hezonja 24; Rebs: Musa 8 Asts: Llull 4 PIR: Hezonja 25	Boxscore	Pts: Alston 17; Rebs: Massa 9 Asts: Obasohan 4 PIR: Massa 22	Arena: Gran Canaria Arena; Attendance: 9,218; Referees: Carlos Peruga, Jordi Aliaga, Alfonso Olivares

Regular season fixture

27 October 2024

Boxscore

Real Madrid	86–61	Baxi Manresa

WiZink Center, Madrid

This was the fifth cup meeting between these two teams, with Real Madrid winning three out of the first four meetings.

Previous cup series
Real Madrid leads 3–1 in all-time cup series

11 April 1971

Boxscore

CD Manresa Kan S	71–70	Real Madrid

1971 semifinals first leg

18 April 1971

Boxscore

Real Madrid	116–78	CD Manresa Kan S

1971 semifinals second leg

23 April 1981

Boxscore

Manresa E.B.	63–87	Real Madrid

1981 semifinals first leg

26 April 1981

Boxscore

Real Madrid	119–90	Manresa E.B.

1981 semifinals second leg

=== Dreamland Gran Canaria vs. Valencia Basket ===
Dreamland Gran Canaria qualified for the semifinals of the Copa del Rey, which it hosts, after overcoming Valencia Basket in an intense quarterfinal duel in which the host team imposed its defense to the Valencian crew. Mike Tobey stood out for the Canarian team with 19 points and 7 rebounds, deactivating the versatility of Jean Montero, which performed 15 points and 5 assists, which was not enough to avoid the host team win.

14 February 2025	Dreamland Gran Canaria	79–65	Valencia Basket	Las Palmas
21:30	Scoring by quarter: 19–15, 21–16, 25–20, 14–14
	Pts: Tobey 19; Rebs: Tobey 7 Asts: Albicy 7 PIR: Tobey 29	Boxscore	Pts: Montero 15; Rebs: Costello 9 Asts: Jones 3 PIR: Montero 14	Arena: Gran Canaria Arena; Attendance: 9,673; Referees: Antonio Conde, Óscar Perea, Arnau Padrós

Regular season fixture

27 December 2024

Boxscore

Dreamland Gran Canaria	97–94	Valencia Basket

Gran Canaria Arena, Las Palmas

This was the sixth cup meeting between these two teams, with Valencia Basket winning four out of the first five meetings.

Previous cup series
Valencia Basket leads 4–1 in all-time cup series

20 February 2003

Boxscore

Pamesa Valencia	81–70	Auna Gran Canaria

2003 quarterfinals

9 February 2013

Boxscore

Valencia Basket	83–72	Gran Canaria 2014

2013 semifinals

18 February 2016

Boxscore

Valencia Basket	78–83	Herbalife Gran Canaria

2016 quarterfinals

17 February 2017

Boxscore

Valencia Basket	88–72	Herbalife Gran Canaria

2017 quarterfinals

15 February 2024

Boxscore

Dreamland Gran Canaria	81–89	Valencia Basket

2024 quarterfinals

== Semifinals ==
=== Unicaja vs. La Laguna Tenerife ===
Unicaja qualified for the fifth time in its history for the Copa del Rey final, after beating in the semifinals La Laguna Tenerife, which suffered due to the physical output in the paint showed by Yankuba Sima, who performed 21 points and 8 rebounds, counteracting the 18 points and 4 assists performed by Marcelo Huertas.

15 February 2025	Unicaja	90–83	La Laguna Tenerife	Las Palmas
18:30	Scoring by quarter: 21–15, 17–24, 34–21, 18–23
	Pts: Sima 21; Rebs: Barreiro, Sima 8 Asts: Díaz 6 PIR: Sima 24	Boxscore	Pts: Huertas 18; Rebs: Shermadini 7 Asts: Shermadini, Fitipaldo 5 PIR: Shermadini 26	Arena: Gran Canaria Arena; Attendance: 9,245; Referees: Juan Carlos García González, Rafael Serrano, Alfonso Olivares

Regular season fixture

30 November 2024

Boxscore

Unicaja	84–81	La Laguna Tenerife

Martín Carpena, Málaga

This was the sixth cup meeting between these two teams, with Unicaja winning three out of the first five meetings.

Previous cup series
Unicaja leads 3–2 in all-time cup series

17 October 1988

Boxscore

Caja Ronda	81–80	Cajacanarias

1989 round of 16 first leg

25 October 1988

Boxscore

Cajacanarias	66–75	Caja Ronda

1989 round of 16 second leg

14 February 2019

Boxscore

Iberostar Tenerife	88–78	Unicaja

2019 quarterfinals

19 February 2023

Boxscore

Lenovo Tenerife	80–83	Unicaja

2023 final

16 February 2024

Boxscore

Unicaja	83–91	Lenovo Tenerife

2024 quarterfinals

=== Dreamland Gran Canaria vs. Real Madrid ===
Real Madrid, which act as the defending champion, ended the dream of the host team, Dreamland Gran Canaria, which were defeated to certify the return of Los Blancos to the final, in which it will face against Unicaja at the Gran Canaria Arena. The team coached by Chus Mateo, which will play the title match for the 11th time in the last 12 editions, skillfully overcame an unsuccessful start and grew as the clock advanced under the leadership of Facundo Campazzo (13 points and 8 assists), helped by Mario Hezonja (14 points ) and the final appearance of Sergio Llull (12), who decided the duel in the second half.

15 February 2025	Dreamland Gran Canaria	63–80	Real Madrid	Las Palmas
21:30	Scoring by quarter: 16–10, 15–20, 16–25, 16–25
	Pts: Homesley 15; Rebs: Salvó 8 Asts: Homesley 5 PIR: Salvó 15	Boxscore	Pts: Hezonja 14; Rebs: Tavares 11; Asts: Campazzo 7 PIR: Tavares 19	Arena: Gran Canaria Arena; Attendance: 9,800; Referees: Antonio Conde, Fernando Calatrava, Arnau Padrós

Regular season fixture

10 November 2024

Boxscore

Real Madrid	83–77	Dreamland Gran Canaria

WiZink Center, Madrid

This was the fifth cup meeting between these two teams, with Real Madrid winning the first four meetings.

Previous cup series
Real Madrid leads 4–0 in all-time cup series

9 February 2007

Boxscore

Real Madrid	85–82	Gran Canaria

2007 quarterfinals

10 February 2011

Boxscore

Real Madrid	78–72	Gran Canaria 2014

2011 quarterfinals

6 February 2014

Boxscore

Real Madrid	83–60	Herbalife Gran Canaria

2014 quarterfinals

21 February 2016

Boxscore

Herbalife Gran Canaria	81–85	Real Madrid

2016 final

== Final ==
Unicaja snatched the crown from Real Madrid, which were defeated at the Gran Canaria Arena by the team from Málaga to return to win the title again two years later, led by Kendrick Perry (27 points, 6/7 on three-pointers and 8 assists) and David Kravish (20 points and 5/6 on three-pointers). Between them, they scored 26 of the Andalusian team's 29 points in the last quarter, in an exhibition at the decisive moment that decided an intense final dominated by Unicaja, in which Los Blancos were overcome by the energy of its rival (17 turnovers), which was in the final for the fifth time and won the trophy for the third time. As in the 2005 final and the 2023 semifinal, Unicaja had to defeat Real Madrid, the most successful team in the competition, that came close to winning its 30th title and ended up bowing down, as it did last September in the super cup final in a new success for the project built by the coach Ibon Navarro.

16 February 2025	Unicaja	93–79	Real Madrid	Las Palmas
20:00	Scoring by quarter: 18–15, 21–21, 25–19, 29–24
	Pts: Perry 27; Rebs: Taylor 8 Asts: Perry 6 PIR: Perry 32	Boxscore	Pts: Campazzo, Llull 14; Rebs: Campazzo, Tavares 6 Asts: Campazzo 5 PIR: Campazzo 21	Arena: Gran Canaria Arena; Attendance: 9,870; Referees: Emilio Pérez Pizarro, Óscar Perea, Jordi Aliaga

Regular season fixture

8 December 2024

Boxscore

Real Madrid	90–77	Unicaja

WiZink Center, Madrid

This was the sixth cup meeting between these two teams, with Real Madrid winning three out of the first five meetings.

Previous cup series
Real Madrid leads 3–2 in all-time cup series

16 March 2001

Boxscore

Unicaja	70–73	Real Madrid

2001 quarterfinals

20 February 2005

Boxscore

Unicaja	80–76	Real Madrid

2005 final

15 February 2018

Boxscore

Real Madrid	89–84	Unicaja

2018 quarterfinals

16 February 2020

Boxscore

Unicaja	68–95	Real Madrid

2020 final

18 February 2023

Boxscore

Real Madrid	82–93	Unicaja

2023 semifinals

2025 Copa del Rey champion
Unicaja
3rd title

== Statistical leaders ==
=== Performance index rating ===
Pos	Player	Club	PIR
1	(Spain) Fran Guerra	La Laguna Tenerife	24.5
2	(Brazil) Marcelinho Huertas	La Laguna Tenerife	24.0
3	(United States) Kameron Taylor	Unicaja	21.7
4	(Slovenia) Mike Tobey	Dreamland Gran Canaria	20.0
5	(Montenegro) Kendrick Perry	Unicaja	18.0

=== Points ===
Pos	Player	Club	PPG
1	(Brazil) Marcelinho Huertas	La Laguna Tenerife	20.0
2	(Croatia) Mario Hezonja	Real Madrid	16.0
3	(Spain) Fran Guerra	La Laguna Tenerife	15.0
4	(Montenegro) Kendrick Perry	Unicaja	14.0
5	(Slovenia) Mike Tobey	Dreamland Gran Canaria	14.0

=== Rebounds ===
Pos	Player	Club	RPG
1	(Cape Verde) Edy Tavares	Real Madrid	7.7
2	(Slovenia) Mike Tobey	Dreamland Gran Canaria	6.0
3	(Croatia) Mario Hezonja	Real Madrid	5.7
4	(United States) Kameron Taylor	Unicaja	5.3
5	(Spain) Miquel Salvó	Dreamland Gran Canaria	5.0

=== Assists ===
Pos	Player	Club	APG
1	(Montenegro) Kendrick Perry	Unicaja	6.3
2	(Uruguay) Bruno Fitipaldo	La Laguna Tenerife	6.0
3	(Brazil) Marcelinho Huertas	La Laguna Tenerife	5.0
4	(Argentina) Facundo Campazzo	Real Madrid	4.7
5	(Spain) Fran Guerra	La Laguna Tenerife	4.5

Source: ACB

== Awards ==
=== MVP ===
Pos.	Player	Team
PG	(Montenegro) Kendrick Perry	Unicaja
