= Jonathan Barreiro =

Spanish basketball player (born 1997)

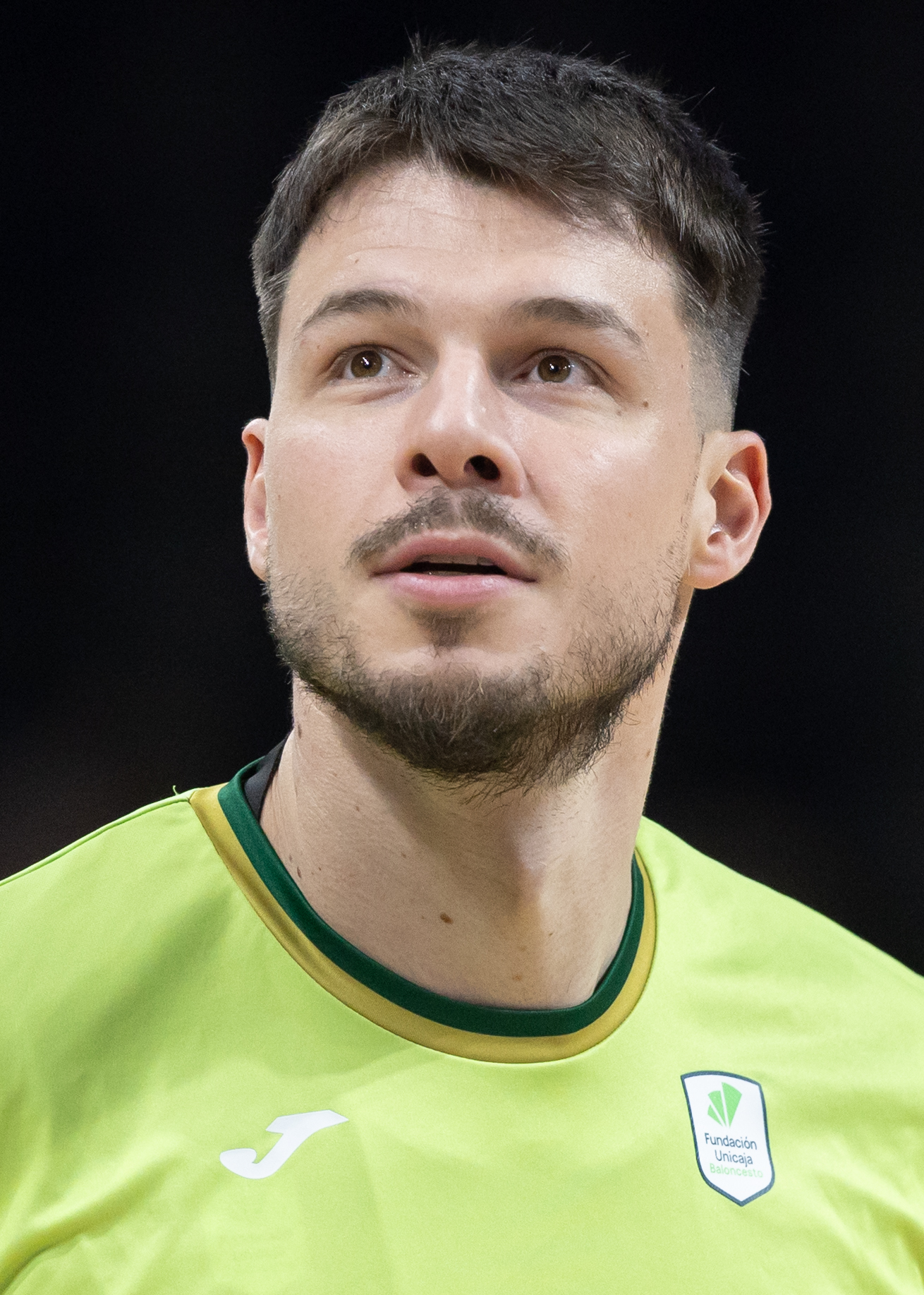
- Barreiro in 2026

No. 7 – Unicaja Málaga
- Position: Small forward
- League: Liga ACB

Personal information
- Born: 16 January 1997 (age 29) Cerceda, Spain
- Listed height: 6 ft 9 in (2.06 m)
- Listed weight: 227 lb (103 kg)

Career information
- Playing career: 2013–present

Career history
- 2013–2015: Real Madrid B
- 2014: →Real Madrid
- 2015–2016: Club Ourense Baloncesto
- 2016–2021: Basket Zaragoza
- 2021–present: Unicaja Málaga

Career highlights
- FIBA Intercontinental Cup champion (2024); 2× FIBA Champions League champion (2024, 2025); 2× Spanish Cup winner (2023, 2025); Spanish Supercup winner (2024); All-Liga ACB Young Team (2018)
Medals
Men's basketball
Representing Spain
FIBA Europe Under-20 Championship
Gold medal – first place	2016 Helsinki	Spain

Jonathan Barreiro Rodríguez (born 16 January 1997) is a Spanish professional basketball player for Unicaja Málaga in the Liga ACB. During the 2013–14 season, at just 17 years old, he made his debut in the Liga ACB and the EuroLeague with the Real Madrid first team.

== Early years ==
Barreiro began his career as a player in the lower categories of Escola Basket Xiria de Carballo (La Coruña) and later in CB Sant-Yago. In the 2010 Minicopa ACB he became known to the general public, playing as a guest for DKV Joventut. In the 2011 Spanish Youth Championship, he averaged 18.1 points and 9.6 rebounds in 25.1 minutes, which attracted the attention of several Spanish clubs. Later, FC Barcelona invited him to play in the 2011 Minicopa ACB and the UBSA Youth Tournament.

In September 2012, Barreiro joined the Real Madrid Basketball youth team, in the cadet category. His first campaign in the white team was marked by his great performances with the cadet team but also by his numerous minutes with the Junior team, reaching the Ciutat de L’Hospitalet NIJT Junior Tournament. In this prestigious tournament his numbers, being a younger player, were: 5.4 points, 3 rebounds and 1.2 assists per game.

In the 2013–14 season, Barreiro joined the Real Madrid Basketball Junior team, where he combined his participation with the Real Madrid B Liga EBA matches. He started the season by winning and being named MVP in the Villaviciosa de Odón Junior Tournament, thanks in large part to his performance in the final: 23 points, 8 rebounds and a PIR of 28 in 24 minutes. In January 2014, Real Madrid Junior won the Ciutat de L’Hospitalet NIJT Junior Tournament, a championship that the white team had not won since 2006. On 13 April 2014, they were proclaimed champions of the Madrid Junior Championship by defeating Tuenti Móvil Estudiantes A and Espacio Torrelodones A in the Final Phase. On 10 May 2014, Real Madrid won the 2014 Spanish Junior Championship, held in Marín (Pontevedra), after 14 years without winning in this competition.

== Professional career ==
In total, Barreiro played 24 games with the EBA, averaging 13.4 points per game. In addition, during that 2013/14 season he debuted with the first team of Real Madri in the EuroLeague (on 28 February 2014 against KK Partizan, scoring one point), and in the Liga ACB (on 9 March 2014 against Obradoiro CAB). On 15 March 2014, Barreiro played his second game in ACB with Real Madrid, against CB Murcia, scoring 3 points. In the summer of 2015 he signed for Club Ourense Baloncesto, thus returning to his native Galicia.

After his time with the Galician club, in August 2016, Barreiro signed a contract with Basket Zaragoza for four seasons.

== National team career ==
In August 2012, Barreiro was crowned champion of the Marín Friendship Tournament with the Spanish U-15 team, defeating the French team in the final.

Due to various injuries, in the summer of 2013 he was unable to compete with the Spanish team in the U-16 European Championship in Ukraine 2013, or the U-17 World Championship, held in Dubai, United Arab Emirates, in the summer of 2014.

In 2016, Barreiro was part of the national team that won gold at the U-20 European Championship, held in Helsinki.

He made his debut with the senior team in February 2018 against Montenegro, in a World Cup qualifying match.
