= Yankuba Sima =

Spanish basketball player

- Sima with Berlin in 2026

No. 77 – Alba Berlin
- Position: Center
- League: Basketball Bundesliga; EuroCup

Personal information
- Born: 28 July 1996 (age 30) Girona, Spain
- Listed height: 2.11 m (6 ft 11 in)
- Listed weight: 102 kg (225 lb)

Career information
- High school: Arlington Country (Jacksonville, Florida)
- College: St. John's (2015–2017); Oklahoma State (2017–2018)
- NBA draft: 2018: undrafted
- Playing career: 2018–present

Career history
- 2018: Breogán
- 2018–2022: Manresa
- 2020: →Ourense
- 2022–2023: Reyer Venezia
- 2023–2025: Unicaja Málaga
- 2025–2026: Valencia Basket
- 2026–present: Alba Berlin

Career highlights
- FIBA Intercontinental Cup champion (2024); 2× FIBA Champions League champion (2024, 2025); Liga ACB champion (2026); 2× Spanish Cup winner (2023, 2025); Spanish Supercup winner (2024)
Medals
Men's basketball
Representing Spain
U20 European Championship
Silver medal – second place	2015 Italy
Gold medal – first place	2016 Finland

Yankuba Sima Fatty (born 28 July 1996), is a Gambian-Spanish professional basketball player for Alba Berlin of the Basketball Bundesliga and the EuroCup. He has also represented the Spanish national team internationally. Standing at 2.11m (6 ft 11 in), Sima plays in the center position.

== Early life and youth career ==
Born in Girona, Catalonia to Gambian parents, Sima started playing basketball at age 7 in local club CE Santa Eugènia de Ter. He later joined the academy of CB Sant Josep. Sima would also join the Canarias Basketball Academy before moving to the United States to continue his studies and further develop his career.

Sima attended and played high school basketball for Arlington Country Day School and Elev8 Institute in Delray, Florida.

== College career ==
Sima played his freshman year of college for St. John's of the Big East Conference. In the 2025-16 season he averaged 7.3 points per game and led the team in rebounds per game with 5.7. He achieved the second highest number of blocks in the conference with 60.

In the 2016–17 season, he transferred to Oklahoma State midseason after playing 10 games for St. John's. In the 2017-18 season, Sima led the team in blocks with 1.1 per game.

== Professional career ==
=== Bàsquet Manresa (2018–2022) ===
Sima returned to Spain in 2018 to pursue professional basketball. He initially joined CB Breogán on a trial period at the start of the 2018-19 season, but he never made his debut for the Galician team. Sima later signed with Bàsquet Manresa of the Liga ACB in December 2018. He made his professional debut on 24 December 2018, in a Liga ACB game against Obradoiro. In March 2019, Manresa extended Sima's contract until 2022. After seeing little playtime during the 2019-20 season Sima joined Club Ourense Baloncesto on loan in January 2020, playing the rest of the season in the LEB Oro.

Sima spent two more seasons in Manresa, recording his best numbers in the 2021-22 season. He averaged 7.4 points and 4 rebounds per game in a total of 36 games played. Sima also reached the 2022 Basketball Champions League Final Four with Manresa, losing the final to Lenovo Tenerife.

=== Reyer Venezia (2022–2023) ===
Sima joined Reyer Venezia in July 2022, competing in the LBA and the EuroCup. Seeing little playtime, Sima would leave the Italian side in January 2023.

=== Unicaja Málaga (2023–2025) ===
Sima joined Unicaja Málaga of the Liga ACB and Basketball Champions League on 12 January 2023. Unicaja would win the 2023 Copa del Rey in Sima's first season, but he missed the competition due to injury. Owing to his good performances with the Andalusians, Sima's contract was extended for another season in June 2023. In his second season with Málaga, Sima would win the 2023-24 Basketball Champions League. Sima's contract was extended with two additional years in July 2024.

The 2024–25 season would be Sima's most successful yet, winning the Intercontinental Cup, the Spanish Supercup and the Copa del Rey. Sima recorded his best numbers with Unicaja in the Copa del Rey semifinal against La Laguna Tenerife, scoring 21 points.

=== Valencia Basket (2025–present) ===
On 4 July 2025, Sima signed a three-season contract with Valencia Basket of the Liga ACB and EuroLeague. Valencia paid the release clause of the contract that bound Sima to Unicaja.

== National team career ==
Sima represented the Spanish U20 team in the 2015 and 2016 U20 European Championship, winning the latter.

He made his debut for the Spanish national team in November 2021, in a win over North Macedonia during the 2023 World Cup qualifiers. Sima was Spain's top scorer with 17 points.

== Career statistics ==
Legend
GP	Games played	GS	Games started	MPG	Minutes per game
FG%	Field-goal percentage	3P%	3-point field-goal percentage	FT%	Free-throw percentage
RPG	Rebounds per game	APG	Assists per game	SPG	Steals per game
BPG	Blocks per game	PPG	Points per game	PIR	Performance index rating
**Bold**	Career high

=== EuroLeague ===
Year	Team	GP	GS	MPG	FG%	3P%	FT%	RPG	APG	SPG	BPG	PPG	PIR
2025–26	Valencia	6	0	8.2	.455	.500	.500	1.8	.0	.0	0.2	3.0	.5
Career		6	0	8.2	.455	.500	.500	1.8	.0	.0	0.2	3.0	.5

=== EuroCup ===
Year	Team	GP	GS	MPG	FG%	3P%	FT%	RPG	APG	SPG	BPG	PPG	PIR
2022–23	Venezia	5	0	7.7	.625	.000	.1000	1.8	.6	.8	.0	2.4	4.0
Career		5	0	7.7	.625	.000	.1000	1.8	.6	.8	.0	2.4	4.0

=== Domestic leagues ===
Year	Team	League	GP	MPG	FG%	3P%	FT%	RPG	APG	SPG	BPG	PPG
2018–19	(Spain) Manresa	ACB	21	8.4	.476	-	.350	2.0	.1	.3	.3	2.2
2019–20	(Spain) Manresa	ACB	1	11.1	.750	-	-	7.0	1.0	-	-	6.0
2019–20	(Spain) Ourense	LEB Oro	7	18.1	.575	-	.600	4.3	.6	.4	.3	8.7
2020–21	(Spain) Manresa	ACB	34	9.4	.596	-	.526	2.3	.5	.3	.1	5.9
2021–22	(Spain) Manresa	ACB	36	17.3	.533	-	.585	4.0	.9	.6	.6	7.4
2022–23	(Italy) Venezia	LBA	6	7.5	.400	-	-	2.0	.8	.2	.3	1.3
2022–23	(Spain) Málaga	ACB	25	15.1	.592	.000	.429	3.6	1.1	.4	.4	5.4
2023–24	(Spain) Málaga	ACB	37	15.3	.553	.000	.591	3.3	.9	.4	.4	5.3
2024–25	(Spain) Málaga	ACB	5	17.2	.455	.000	.667	2.6	1.4	.8	.2	5.2
2025–26	(Spain) Valencia	ACB	5	7.2	.533	.333	.1000	2.0	.0	.2	.8	3.8

=== College ===
Year	Team	GP	GS	MPG	FG%	3P%	FT%	RPG	APG	SPG	BPG	PPG
2015–16	St. John's	25	18	23.4	.487	.500	.386	5.7	1.2	.6	2.4	7.3
2016–17	St. John's	10	8	17.8	.447	-	.720	3.5	.6	.4	.5	6.0
2017–18	Oklahoma State	27	8	14.6	.500	.000	.425	3.1	.3	.5	1.1	3.7
Career		62	34	18.7	.484	.333	.459	4.2	.7	.5	1.5	5.5

== Personal life ==
Sima speaks Catalan, Spanish and English. He has four brothers and two sisters. One of his brothers, Ousman Sima, plays basketball professionally for Albacete Basket.
