= 2024 Copa del Rey de Baloncesto =

88th edition of the Spanish Basketball King's Cup

2024 Copa del Rey

Tournament details
- Country: Spain
- City: Málaga
- Venue: Martín Carpena
- Dates: 15–18 February 2024
- Teams: 8
- Defending champions: Unicaja

Final positions
- Champions: Real Madrid (29th title)
- Runners-up: Barça
- Semifinalists: Valencia Basket; Lenovo Tenerife

Tournament statistics
- Matches played: 7
- Attendance: 73,004 (10,429 per match)

Awards
- MVP: Facundo Campazzo (Real Madrid)

The 2024 Copa del Rey de Baloncesto was the 88th edition of the Spanish Basketball King's Cup. It was managed by the ACB and was held in Málaga, in the Martín Carpena sports palace in February 2024.

Unicaja were the defending champions, but were eliminated in quarterfinals by Lenovo Tenerife in the repeat of the 2023 final.

Real Madrid won the final and conquered their 29th cup, their first since 2020 in the same arena that last time.

All times are in Central European Time (UTC+01:00).

== Qualified teams ==
The top seven ranking teams after the first half of the 2023–24 ACB regular season qualified to the tournament. As Unicaja, host team, finished between the seven first teams, the eighth qualified entered in the Copa del Rey.

| Pos | Team | Pld | W | L | PF | PA | PD | Qualification |
|---|---|---|---|---|---|---|---|---|
| 1 | Real Madrid | 17 | 16 | 1 | 1557 | 1317 | +240 | Qualification as seeded team |
| 2 | Unicaja (H) | 17 | 14 | 3 | 1498 | 1302 | +196 | Qualification as seeded team |
| 3 | Barça | 17 | 11 | 6 | 1458 | 1363 | +95 | Qualification as seeded team |
| 4 | Dreamland Gran Canaria | 17 | 11 | 6 | 1425 | 1396 | +29 | Qualification as seeded team |
| 5 | UCAM Murcia | 17 | 10 | 7 | 1414 | 1371 | +43 | Qualification as unseeded team |
| 6 | Valencia Basket | 17 | 10 | 7 | 1367 | 1339 | +28 | Qualification as unseeded team |
| 7 | Lenovo Tenerife | 17 | 9 | 8 | 1403 | 1371 | +32 | Qualification as unseeded team |
| 8 | Baxi Manresa | 17 | 9 | 8 | 1427 | 1432 | −5 | Qualification as unseeded team |

Source: ACB
Rules for classification: 1) Win–loss record; 2) Point difference; 3) Points scored; 4) Sum of quotients of points scored; 5) Previous season standings position.
(H) Hosts

== Venue ==
On February 20, 2023, ACB selected and announced Málaga to host the Copa del Rey in February 2024. The arena was opened in 1999. It has been the long–time home arena to one of Spain's top ACB teams, Unicaja. The arena originally had a seating capacity of 9,743 spectators, and an area of around 22,000 square meters. In 2007, a project was proposed to expand the capacity of the venue to 17,000 spectators, due to the high demand for seats and tickets by fans of Unicaja. Ultimately, the expansion project was approved, but to a new capacity of 13,000 spectators, rather than the originally planned 17,000. The expansion project was then scheduled to be completed in separate phases. The first expansion phase, which was completed in 2010, increased the seating capacity from 9,743 to 11,000.

| Málaga | 2024 Copa del Rey de Baloncesto (Spain) |
| Martín Carpena | 2024 Copa del Rey de Baloncesto (Spain) |
| Capacity: 10,602 | 2024 Copa del Rey de Baloncesto (Spain) |

== Draw ==
The draw was held on 15 January 2024 in Málaga, Spain. The top four ranking teams act as seeded teams in the draw of the quarterfinals. For its part, the top ranked team played its quarterfinal match on Thursday.

== Bracket ==
Quarterfinals; 15–16 February
Real Madrid | 84
UCAM Murcia | 79
Dreamland Gran Canaria | 81
Valencia Basket | 89
Barça | 102
Baxi Manresa | 91
Unicaja | 83
Lenovo Tenerife | 91

Semifinals; 17 February
Real Madrid | 95
Valencia Basket | 76
Barça | 108
Lenovo Tenerife | 76

Final; 18 February
Real Madrid | 96
Barça | 85

== Quarterfinals ==
=== Real Madrid vs. UCAM Murcia ===
Real Madrid reached its 11th consecutive semifinal after beating UCAM Murcia that fought until the end in a close match. A complete performance of Facundo Campazzo (16 points and 4 assists) and the contributions of Gabriel Deck (15 points), Mario Hezonja (14 points) and Sergio Llull (13 points) prevented further damage and allowed Real Madrid to comply with the script and clinch, with more suffering than expected, their ticket to the semifinals against UCAM Murcia that gave everything and had options until the end, but were hampered by their poor 3-point percentage in a match where they were behind on the scoreboard from start to finish. In this match, Sergio Llull became the player with more 3-pointers made in the history of the final stage of the Copa del Rey.

| 15 February 2024 | Real Madrid | 84–79 | UCAM Murcia | Málaga |
| 18:00 | Scoring by quarter: 25–17, 19–17, 19–22, 21–23 |
| | Pts: Campazzo 16; Rebs: Hezonja 7 Asts: Campazzo 4 PIR: Campazzo 25 | Boxscore | Pts: Ennis 17; Rebs: Sant-Roos, Todorović 5 Asts: Caupain 4 PIR: Caupain, Ennis 12 | Arena: Martín Carpena; Attendance: 9,736; Referees: Emilio Pérez Pizarro, Benjamín Jiménez, Alfonso Olivares |

=== Dreamland Gran Canaria vs. Valencia Basket ===
Valencia Basket reached the semifinals after beating Dreamland Gran Canaria in extra time. The Valencian defense and Brandon Davies's energy (17 points and 7 rebounds) were decisive. A 10–0 streak near of the end of the fourth quarter and their greatest skill in extra time helped Valencia Basket from being eliminated from the Copa del Rey at the hands of a brave Dreamland Gran Canaria which, after dominating for much of the match and forcing extra time at the buzzer, ended up giving in to the faith of its rival, which knew how to overcome the scoring exhibition of Sylven Landesberg with 25 points.

| 15 February 2024 | Dreamland Gran Canaria | 81–89(OT) | Valencia Basket | Málaga |
| 21:00 | Scoring by quarter: 18–17, 17–15, 19–16, 23–29, Overtime: 4–12 |
| | Pts: Landesberg 25; Rebs: Lammers 8 Asts: Brussino 5 PIR: Landesberg 24 | Boxscore | Pts: Davies 17; Rebs: Inglis 12; Asts: Inglis 7 PIR: Inglis 22 | Arena: Martín Carpena; Attendance: 9,598; Referees: Miguel Ángel Pérez Pérez, Luis Miguel Castillo, Sergio Manuel |

=== Barça vs. Baxi Manresa ===
Barça had to work hard to overcome a great Baxi Manresa. The exhibition in the hoops of Willy Hernangómez (16 points and 10 rebounds) in his return to the Copa del Rey eight years later and the skills and intelligence of Jabari Parker (19 points) and Nicolás Laprovíttola (18 points) broke the resistance of a choral Baxi Manresa which kept in the match for 38 minutes with Barça that, after its early elimination in 2023, returned to the semifinals two years later.

| 16 February 2024 | Barça | 102–91 | Baxi Manresa | Málaga |
| 18:00 | Scoring by quarter: 22–23, 28–20, 24–28, 28–20 |
| | Pts: Parker 19; Rebs: Hernangómez 10; Asts: Laprovíttola 8 PIR: Laprovíttola 25 | Boxscore | Pts: Taylor 17; Rebs: Vaulet 9 Asts: Taylor 6 PIR: Geben 16 | Arena: Martín Carpena; Attendance: 10,423; Referees: Juan Carlos García González, Fernando Calatrava, Carlos Cortés |

=== Unicaja vs. Lenovo Tenerife ===
Lenovo Tenerife, one year later, was in the 2023 final against Unicaja that, on this occasion lost. Points gained by Aaron Doornekamp (25 points with 6/6 in three-pointers), Kyle Guy (23 points) and Giorgi Shermadini (17 points).

| 16 February 2024 | Unicaja | 83–91 | Lenovo Tenerife | Málaga |
| 21:00 | Scoring by quarter: 26–26, 23–19, 16–21, 18–25 |
| | Pts: Osetkowski 16; Rebs: Kravish 8 Asts: Díaz, Taylor 4 PIR: Osetkowski 20 | Boxscore | Pts: Doornekamp 25; Rebs: Cook 9 Asts: Guy 7 PIR: Guy 30 | Arena: Martín Carpena; Attendance: 10,900; Referees: Antonio Conde, Rafael Serrano, Arnau Padrós |

== Semifinals ==
=== Real Madrid vs. Valencia Basket ===
Real Madrid advanced to the Copa del Rey final by downing Valencia Basket in the first semifinal. Džanan Musa led the winners with 18 points. Guerschon Yabusele added 14, Sergio Llull had 11 while Facundo Campazzo and Vincent Poirier each got 10 for Real Madrid. Brandon Davies led Valencia with 18 points. Justin Anderson and Xabier López-Arostegui had 12 apiece. Davies and Chris Jones each struck from downtown to give Valencia Basket an early 3–6 lead. Real Madrid found a go–to guy in Musa, who had 7 points in a 16–0 run that Yabusele capped with a basket that boosted Real Madrid' lead to 19–6. Jones and Semi Ojeleye brought Valencia Basket closer, 23–17, after 10 minutes. López-Arostegui got Valencia Basket within 42–39 near halftime, then Musa and Mario Hezonja boosted Real Madrid's lead to 48–39 at halftime. Musa and Yabusele got help from Campazzo to break the game open, 65–44, soon after the break, and Real Madrid never looked back.

| 17 February 2024 | Real Madrid | 95–76 | Valencia Basket | Málaga |
| 18:00 | Scoring by quarter: 23–17, 25–22, 32–16, 15–21 |
| | Pts: Musa 18; Rebs: Poirier, Tavares 8 Asts: Campazzo 9 PIR: Poirier, Campazzo 22 | Boxscore | Pts: Davies 18; Rebs: Inglis 9 Asts: Jones 4 PIR: Davies, López-Arostegui 13 | Arena: Martín Carpena; Attendance: 10,900; Referees: Carlos Peruga, Carlos Cortés, Luis Miguel Castillo |

=== Barça vs. Lenovo Tenerife ===
Barça reached the Copa del Rey final for the 39th time by thrashing Lenovo Tenerife in Málaga. Willy Hernangómez led Barça with 15 points. Darío Brizuela added 13 while Álex Abrines, Joel Parra and Rokas Jokubaitis had for 10 for Barça, who trailed 14–16 after 10 minutes. Brizuela, Tomáš Satoranský and Abrines each struck from downtown in a 27–4 run that broke the game open, 41–20. Barça soon boosted its margin to 54–24 at the break. That 30-point lead at halftime is one of the three records Barça beat in this game, along with most points in a quarter (40) and biggest difference in a quarter (40–8, +32). Barça went on to keep a really safe lead until the final buzzer ahead of its next game against Real Madrid in a new edition of El Clásico at the Copa del Rey final.

| 17 February 2024 | Barça | 108–76 | Lenovo Tenerife | Málaga |
| 21:00 | Scoring by quarter: 14–16, 40–8, 24–24, 30–28 |
| | Pts: Hernangómez 15; Rebs: Hernangómez 7 Asts: Satoranský 7 PIR: Hernangómez 22 | Boxscore | Pts: Abromaitis 16; Rebs: Diop, Shermadini 4 Asts: Huertas 4 PIR: Abromaitis 17 | Arena: Martín Carpena; Attendance: 10,547; Referees: Juan Carlos García González, Emilio Pérez Pizarro, Alfonso Olivares |

== Final ==
Real Madrid won the Copa del Rey for a record 29th time after holding off archrival Barça in the final. Facundo Campazzo starred with 18 points and 6 assists and Vincent Poirier posted 17 points and 8 rebounds to lead the winners in a perfect final for the French center. Džanan Musa and Guerschon Yabusele added 15 points apiece, Gabriel Deck scored 13 and Mario Hezonja 12. Jabari Parker paced Barça with 19 points, Tomáš Satoranský contributed 15 and Jan Veselý 14. Real Madrid jumped out to a 9–2 start and Barça came back to tie the final in 19–19 at the end of the first quarter. It was 43–45 at halftime and Veselý put Barça up by 4 early in the third quarter. Real Madrid turned the tables to take a 66–63 lead into the fourth quarter. Three–pointers made by Yabusele and Deck saw Madrid pad their lead, but Barça kept it close, 81–77, after a Satoranský basket with less than 4 minutes to play. A 12–2 run then put the game on ice and started the celebrations.

| 18 February 2024 | Real Madrid | 96–85 | Barça | Málaga |
| 18:30 | Scoring by quarter: 19–19, 24–26, 23–18, 30–22 |
| | Pts: Campazzo 18; Rebs: Yabusele 9 Asts: Campazzo 6 PIR: Poirier 32 | Boxscore | Pts: Parker 19; Rebs: Hernangómez 8 Asts: Laprovíttola 4 PIR: Parker 17 | Arena: Martín Carpena; Attendance: 10,900; Referees: Antonio Conde, Rafael Serrano, Arnau Padrós |

2024 Copa del Rey champions
Real Madrid
29th title

== Statistical leaders ==
=== Performance Index Rating ===
| Pos | Player | Club | PIR |
|---|---|---|---|
| 1 | (Austria) Sylven Landesberg | Dreamland Gran Canaria | 24.0 |
| 2 | (France) Vincent Poirier | Real Madrid | 22.3 |
| 3 | (Georgia (country)) Giorgi Shermadini | Lenovo Tenerife | 21.0 |
| 4 | (Argentina) Facundo Campazzo | Real Madrid | 20.3 |
| 5 | (United States) Dylan Osetkowski | Unicaja | 20.0 |

=== Points ===
| Pos | Player | Club | PPG |
|---|---|---|---|
| 1 | (Austria) Sylven Landesberg | Dreamland Gran Canaria | 25.0 |
| 2 | (United States) Kyle Guy | Lenovo Tenerife | 17.5 |
| 3 | (Uganda) Brandon Davies | Valencia Basket | 17.5 |
| 4 | (Jamaica) Dylan Ennis | UCAM Murcia | 17.0 |
| 5 | (United States) Brandon Taylor | Baxi Manresa | 17.0 |

=== Rebounds ===
| Pos | Player | Club | RPG |
|---|---|---|---|
| 1 | (France) Damien Inglis | Valencia Basket | 10.5 |
| 2 | (Argentina) Juan Pablo Vaulet | Baxi Manresa | 9.0 |
| 3 | (Spain) Willy Hernangómez | Barça | 8.3 |
| 4 | (Bulgaria) David Kravish | Unicaja | 8.0 |
| 5 | (United States) Ben Lammers | Dreamland Gran Canaria | 8.0 |

=== Assists ===
| Pos | Player | Club | APG |
|---|---|---|---|
| 1 | (Argentina) Facundo Campazzo | Real Madrid | 6.3 |
| 2 | (United States) Brandon Taylor | Baxi Manresa | 6.0 |
| 3 | (Argentina) Nicolás Brussino | Dreamland Gran Canaria | 5.0 |
| 4 | (Argentina) Nicolás Laprovíttola | Barça | 5.0 |
| 5 | (France) Damien Inglis | Valencia Basket | 5.0 |

Source: ACB

== Awards ==
=== MVP ===
| Pos. | Player | Team |
|---|---|---|
| PG | (Argentina) Facundo Campazzo | Real Madrid |
