= 2001 Copa del Rey de Baloncesto =

The Copa del Rey 2001 was the 65th edition of the Spanish basketball Cup. It was organized by the ACB and was disputed in Málaga in the Palacio Martín Carpena between days 15 and 18 of March, 2001. The winning team was FC Barcelona.

== Brackett ==
Quarterfinals; March 15 & 16		Semifinals; March 17		Final; March 18
FC Barcelona	98
Jabones Pardo Fuenlabrada	76	FC Barcelona	95
Pamesa Valencia	73	Pamesa Valencia	69
Adecco Estudiantes	54			FC Barcelona	80
TAU Cerámica	71			Real Madrid	77
Cáceres CB	86	Cáceres CB	71
Real Madrid	73	Real Madrid	80
Unicaja Málaga	70

== Final ==
March 18
18:00 GTM+1

Box Score

(Catalonia) FC Barcelona	80–77	(Community of Madrid) Real Madrid
Scoring by quarter: 23-19, 13-24, 18-9, 26-25
Pts: P.Gasol 25; Rebs: Dueñas 8 Asts: Hawkins, Jasikevičius 4		Pts: Herreros 25; Rebs: Struelens 4 Asts: four players 2

Palacio Martín Carpena, Málaga
Attendance: 8,500
Referees: Mateo Ramos, José Antonio Martín Bertrán and Daniel Hierrezuelo

Copa del Rey 2001 Champions

FC Barcelona
18th title

- MVP of the Tournament: Pau Gasol

== See also ==
- Liga ACB
- Copa del Rey de Baloncesto
