= CB Gran Canaria =

Spanish basketball team

Gran Canaria
- Nickname: Granca
- Leagues: Primera FEB
- Founded: 1963; 63 years ago
- History: Colegio Claret (1963–1985); Claret Las Palmas (1985–1988); C.B. Gran Canaria (1988–present)
- Arena: Gran Canaria Arena
- Capacity: 11,500
- Location: Las Palmas, Spain
- Team colors: Yellow, Blue
- Head coach: Bruno Savignani
- Championships: 1 EuroCup; 1 Spanish Supercup
- Retired numbers: 2 (11, 20)
- Website: Official website
Home	Away

Club Baloncesto Gran Canaria, S.A.D., known as Cajasiete Gran Canaria due to sponsorship, is a professional basketball club based in Las Palmas, Spain. The team plays in the Spanish Primera FEB. Their home venue is the Gran Canaria Arena.

== History ==
CB Gran Canaria was founded inside Claret School and for many years played under that denomination. Following a successful period in school competitions, a senior team was created and integrated on the Spanish Second Division. The team played in that division until 1984, when the team adopted the decision of having a statute of its own, therefore becoming an independent institution. The new statute was approved on May 22, 1985, and the team became Claret Club de Baloncesto.

The following years, the team moved many times between Liga ACB and 1st Division B. On the 1987–88 season the club changed its name to CB Gran Canaria, paying homage to the place where its social mass came from. On 30 June 1992 the team became a sports public limited company (Sociedad Anónima Deportiva, SAD in Spanish) in order to fulfil with the requirements of the then-new Spanish sports legislation.

After three seasons in the Spanish silver division the team won the first Liga EBA in the 1994–95 season and was promoted to Liga ACB. From that season on, CB Gran Canaria has stayed in the top level of the Spanish basketball. The 2012–13 represents the team's eighteenth consecutive season in Liga ACB.

In April 2015, Gran Canaria played the Eurocup Finals. The team was defeated by BC Khimki in the two legs. Ten months later, the club qualified for the first time to a final of a national trophy. In the 2016 Copa del Rey defeated Valencia Basket in the quarterfinals and Dominion Bilbao Basket in the semifinals, but could not beat Real Madrid in the final, where it lost by 81–85.

On 24 September 2016, Gran Canaria won its first national title after beating FC Barcelona 79–59 in the Final of the 2016 Supercopa played in Vitoria-Gasteiz.

One season later, in June 2018, Gran Canaria qualified for the second time to the league semifinals and also achieved qualification to the EuroLeague for the first time ever.

In the 2022–23 EuroCup Basketball finals Gran Canaria defeated Türk Telekom, which was played at the Gran Canaria Arena in Las Palmas, to win their first EuroCup title. As winners, Gran Canaria automatically qualified for the 2023–24 EuroLeague. However, Gran Canaria gave up their spot in the league due to financial reasons.

Starting from the 2025–26 season, Gran Canaria decided to compete in the Basketball Champions League, leaving their 7-year journey in EuroCup behind.

== Sponsorship naming ==
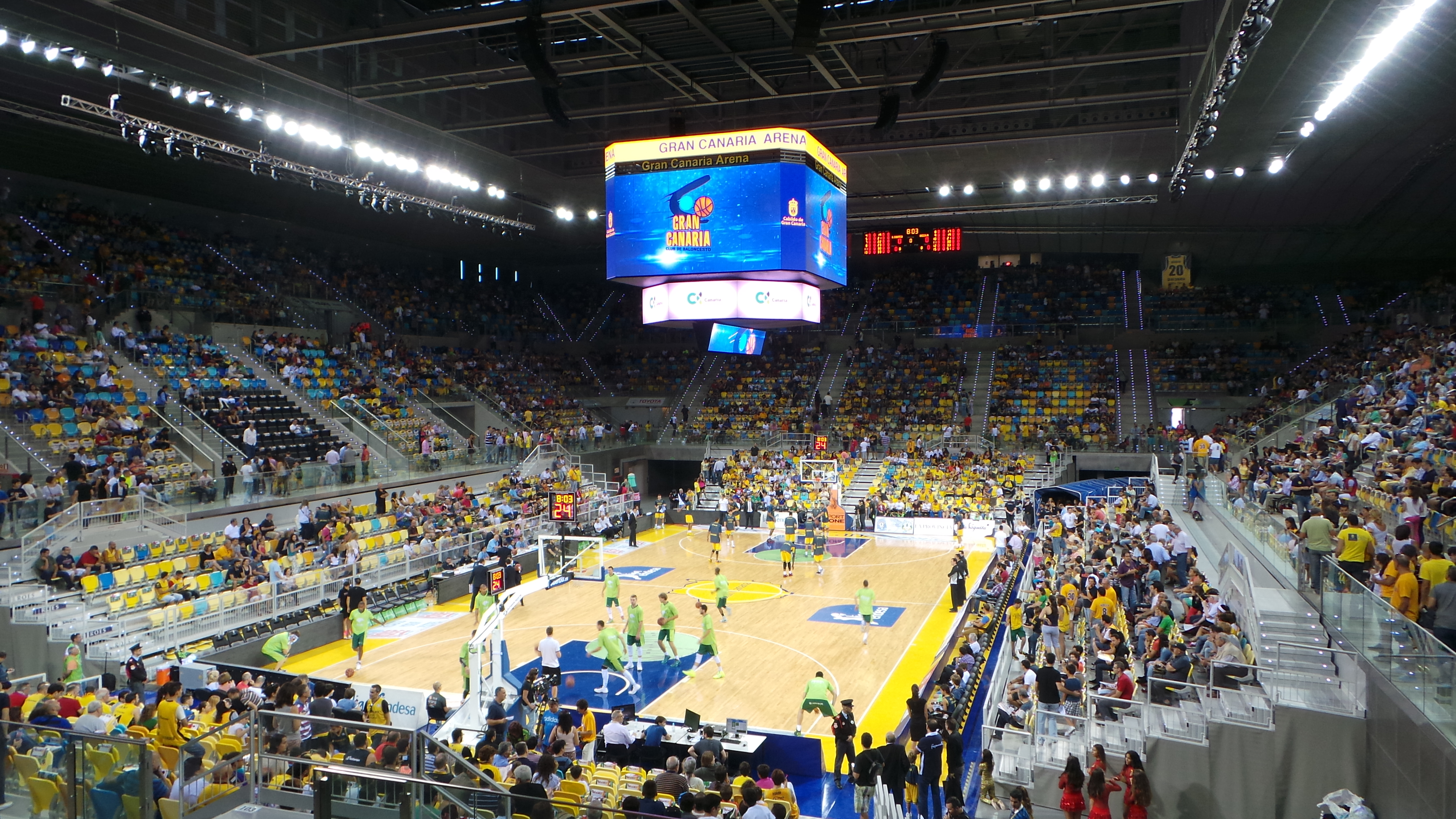
Home game in Gran Canaria Arena in 2014

Through the years CB Gran Canaria has had several denominations due to its sponsorship:

- Canarias Telecom: 1999–2002
- Auna Gran Canaria: 2002–04
- Gran Canaria Grupo Dunas: 2006–07
- Kalise Gran Canaria: 2007–09
- Gran Canaria 2014: 2009–12
- Herbalife Gran Canaria: 2012–2021
- Dreamland Gran Canaria: 2023–2026
- Cajasiete Gran Canaria: 2026–present

== Logos ==
Kalise Gran Canaria logo
(2007–2009)

CB Gran Canaria non-commercial logo
(until 2014)

CB Gran Canaria logo
(2014–present)

== Home arenas ==
- Centro Insular de Deportes: (until 2014)
- Gran Canaria Arena: (2014–present)

== Players ==
=== Retired numbers ===
Gran Canaria retired numbers
No.	Nat.	Player	Position	Tenure
11	(United States)	Greg Stewart	C	1988–1990 1991–1992
20	(Republic of Ireland)	Jim Moran	SF	2001–2011

=== Roster ===
Note: Flags indicate national team eligibility at FIBA-sanctioned events. Players may hold other non-FIBA nationalities not displayed.

Dreamland Gran Canaria roster
Players
Coaches

Pos.	No.	Nat.	Name	Ht.	Age
G/F	3	(United States)	Townes, Marques	1.93 m (6 ft 4 in)	31 – 3 September 1995
PG	6	(Iceland)	Guðmundsson, Jón Axel	1.95 m (6 ft 5 in)	30 – 27 October 1996
SF	10	(Spain)	Salvó, Miquel (injured) (C)	2.05 m (6 ft 9 in)	32 – 3 November 1994
PG	12	(Spain)	Alocén, Carlos	1.94 m (6 ft 4 in)	25 – 30 December 2000
PF	13	(France)	Pelos, Pierre	2.05 m (6 ft 9 in)	34 – 16 August 1992
G/F	14	(Uruguay)	Rodríguez, Joaquín	1.94 m (6 ft 4 in)	27 – 14 June 1999
SF	17	(Spain)	Rubio Niñirola, Juan	1.97 m (6 ft 6 in)	31 – 17 November 1995
PG	22	(Spain)	Díaz, Christian	1.85 m (6 ft 1 in)	34 – 23 March 1992
PF	23	(Latvia)	Stumbris, Roberts	1.98 m (6 ft 6 in)	33 – 9 July 1993
SG	24	(United States)	Cremo, Joe	1.93 m (6 ft 4 in)	30 – 5 November 1996
C	35	(Spain)	Guerra, Fran	2.14 m (7 ft 0 in)	33 – 23 December 1992
C	40	(United States) (Armenia)	Fischer, Luke	2.11 m (6 ft 11 in)	32 – 29 October 1994

Head coach

- (Brazilian Basketball Confederation) (Italian Basketball Federation) Bruno Savignani

Assistant coach(es)

- (Spanish Basketball Federation) Víctor García
- (Federación Dominicana de Baloncesto) Eulis Báez
- (Spanish Basketball Federation) Asier Setién

Legend

- (C) Team captain
- (Y) Youth player
- Injured

- Roster
- Transactions

=== Depth chart ===
Pos.	Starting 5	Bench 1	Bench 2	Inactive
C	Fran Guerra †	Luke Fischer
PF	Pierre Pelos	Roberts Stumbris
SF	Joaquín Rodríguez	Juan Rubio Niñirola †		Miquel Salvó † (injured)
SG	Marques Townes	Joe Cremo *
PG	Carlos Alocén †	Jón Axel Guðmundsson	Christian Díaz †

Notes: Blue † – homegrown player; (Note: A homegrown player is a player that played for at least three years before the age of 20 on a Spanish team. In Liga ACB, the team must register at least four homegrown players in rosters of 10–12 players or at least three homegrown players in rosters of 8–9 players. In Champions League, the team must register at least five homegrown players in rosters of 11–12 players or at least four homegrown players in rosters of 10 players.) Red * – overseas player; (Note: An overseas player is a player from outside EEA, FIBA Europe or ACP states. In Liga ACB, the team may register at most two overseas players. In Champions League, the team did not have any limitations regarding the number of overseas players.) Green ‡ – youth player (Note: In Liga ACB, the team may register under-22 players linked to the youth system.)

== Head coaches ==
- Joaquín Costa: 1985–90
- Manolo Hussein: 1990–92, 1995–2002
- Trifón Poch: 1992–94
- Roberto Orellana: 1994–95
- Pedro Martínez: 2002–05, 2009–2014, 2019
- Salva Maldonado: 2005–09, 2018
- Aíto García Reneses: 2014–2016
- Luis Casimiro: 2016–2018
- Víctor García: 2018–2019
- Fotios Katsikaris: 2019–2020
- Porfirio Fisac: 2020–2022
- Jaka Lakovič: 2022–2026
- Néstor García: 2026
- Bruno Savignani: 2026–present

== Season by season ==
Season	Tier	Division	Pos.	W–L	Copa del Rey	Other cups		European competitions		
1962–63	3	2ª División	7th							
1963–64	3	2ª División	9th							
1964–65	3	2ª División	7th							
1965–66	3	2ª División	8th							
1966–67	3	2ª División	10th							
1967–68	3	2ª División	7th							
1968–69	3	2ª División	8th							
1969–70	3	2ª División	5th							
1970–71	3	2ª División	10th							
1971–72	3	2ª División	3rd							
1972–73	3	2ª División	3rd							
1973–74	3	2ª División	5th							
1974–75	3	2ª División	7th							
1975–76	3	2ª División	7th							
1976–77	3	2ª División	7th							
1977–78	3	2ª División	8th							
1978–79	3	2ª División	8th							
1979–80	3	2ª División	6th							
1980–81	3	2ª División	10th							
1981–82	3	2ª División	10th							
1982–83	3	2ª División	7th							
1983–84	3	2ª División	2nd							
1984–85	2	1ª División B	2nd	19–7						
1985–86	1	Liga ACB	15th	8–23						
1986–87	2	1ª División B	3rd	22–12						
1987–88	2	1ª División B	3rd	31–16						
1988–89	1	Liga ACB	18th	20–19	Round of 16					
1989–90	1	Liga ACB	23rd	15–29	First round					
1990–91	2	1ª División	1st	31–11						
1991–92	1	Liga ACB	23rd	14–30	First round					
1992–93	2	1ª División	9th	20–18						
1993–94	2	1ª División	5th	21–14						
1994–95	2	Liga EBA	2nd	29–10						
1995–96	1	Liga ACB	14th	16–22						
1996–97	1	Liga ACB	12th	17–17						
1997–98	1	Liga ACB	10th	15–19						
1998–99	1	Liga ACB	14th	13–21						
1999–00	1	Liga ACB	7th	19–18	Quarterfinalist					
2000–01	1	Liga ACB	13th	12–22				3 Korać Cup	R32	1–1
2001–02	1	Liga ACB	16th	10–24						
2002–03	1	Liga ACB	5th	21–16	Quarterfinalist					
2003–04	1	Liga ACB	7th	18–20				2 ULEB Cup	R16	8–4
2004–05	1	Liga ACB	8th	20–18	Quarterfinalist			2 ULEB Cup	RS	6–4
2005–06	1	Liga ACB	5th	20–17	Quarterfinalist			3 FIBA Eurocup	GS	3–3
2006–07	1	Liga ACB	6th	22–16	Quarterfinalist			2 ULEB Cup	R16	5–7
2007–08	1	Liga ACB	9th	16–18				2 ULEB Cup	L16	10–4
2008–09	1	Liga ACB	6th	21–14	Quarterfinalist			2 Eurocup	RS	4–4
2009–10	1	Liga ACB	8th	17–19		Supercopa	SF	2 Eurocup	QF	9–5
2010–11	1	Liga ACB	6th	21–15	Quarterfinalist			2 Eurocup	L16	8–6
2011–12	1	Liga ACB	14th	13–21				2 Eurocup	RS	4–2
2012–13	1	Liga ACB	4th	21–19	Semifinalist					
2013–14	1	Liga ACB	5th	23–14	Quarterfinalist					
2014–15	1	Liga ACB	8th	18–18	Quarterfinalist			2 Eurocup	RU	21–3
2015–16	1	Liga ACB	5th	22–15	Runner-up	Supercopa	SF	2 Eurocup	SF	16–6
2016–17	1	Liga ACB	7th	22–13	Quarterfinalist	Supercopa	C	2 EuroCup	QF	11–5
2017–18	1	Liga ACB	4th	22–18	Semifinalist	Supercopa	RU	2 EuroCup	QF	9–9
2018–19	1	Liga ACB	12th	14–20				1 EuroLeague	RS	8–22
2019–20	1	Liga ACB	11th	13–14						
2020–21	1	Liga ACB	8th	18–20				2 EuroCup	SF	14–7
2021–22	1	Liga ACB	8th	17–19				2 EuroCup	QF	13–7
2022–23	1	Liga ACB	7th	19–17	Quarterfinalist			2 EuroCup	C	19–3
2023–24	1	Liga ACB	7th	20–16	Quarterfinalist			2 EuroCup	EF	12–7
2024–25	1	Liga ACB	7th	19–17	Semifinalist			2 EuroCup	RU	16–9
2025–26	1	Liga ACB	17th	10–24				3 Champions League	R16	9–3
2026–27	2	Primera FEB				Spain Cup				

== Trophies and awards ==
=== Domestic competitions ===
- Spanish Cup

Runners-up (1): 2016

- Spanish Supercup

Winners (1): 2016
Runners-up (1): 2017

- Liga de Verano ACB

Winners (1): 2005

=== European competitions ===
- EuroCup

Champions (1): 2022–23
Runners-up (2): 2014–15, 2024–25

=== Other competitions ===
- 2nd division championships: (2)
  - 1ª División B: (1) 1991
  - Liga EBA: (1) 1995
- Copa Toyota: (7)
  - 2003, 2004, 2005, 2006, 2007, 2012, 2013
- Trofeo Gobierno de Canarias: (4)
  - 2006, 2007, 2008, 2010
  - Runners-up (4): 2002, 2005, 2009, 2011
- Rome, Italy Invitational Game: (1)
  - 2009

=== Individual awards ===
All-ACB Team

- Jaycee Carroll – 2011

Supercup MVP

- Kyle Kuric – 2016

EuroCup Finals MVP

- John Shurna – 2023

All-EuroCup First Team

- Walter Tavares – 2015
- Alen Omić – 2016
- John Shurna – 2023

All-EuroCup Second Team

- James Augustine – 2010
- Kyle Kuric – 2015
- Kevin Pangos – 2016

== Notable players ==
Note: Flags indicate national team eligibility at FIBA-sanctioned events. Players may hold other non-FIBA nationalities not displayed.

Criteria

To appear in this section a player must have either:

- Set a club record or won an individual award while at the club
- Played at least one official international match for their national team at any time
- Played at least one official NBA match at any time.

- (Spain) Berdi Pérez
- (Spain) Roberto Íñiguez
- (Spain) Xavi Rabaseda
- (Spain) Fran Vázquez
- (Spain) Santiago Aldama
- (Argentina) Jorge Racca
- (Australia) Brad Newley
- (Brazil) Vítor Benite
- (Canada) Carl English
- (Cape Verde) Walter Tavares
- (Estonia) Siim-Sander Vene
- (Finland) Sasu Salin
- (Greece) Michael Bramos
- (United Kingdom) Joel Freeland
- (Hungary) Kornél Dávid
- (Italy) Vincenzo Esposito
- (Republic of Ireland) - (United States) Jim Moran
- (Republic of Ireland) - (United States) Jay Larrañaga
- (Republic of Ireland) - (United States) Pat Burke
- (Israel) Gal Mekel
- (Latvia) Anžejs Pasečņiks
- (North Macedonia) - (United States) Bo McCalebb
- (New Zealand) Kirk Penney
- (Senegal) - (Spain) Sitapha Savané
- (United States) Willie 'Hutch' Jones
- (United States) Tom Scheffler
- (United States) Shaun Vandiver
- (United States) Albert Burditt
- (United States) John Morton
- (United States) Bernard Hopkins
- (United States) Kenny Miller
- (United States) Rex Walters
- (United States) Marcus Goree
- (United States) - (Nigeria) Ime Udoka
- (United States) Will McDonald
- (United States) Billy Keys
- (United States) Kennedy Winston
- (United States) Harper Williams
- (United States) - (Croatia) Marcus Norris
- (United States) - (Lebanon) Jackson Vroman
- (United States) - (Azerbaijan) Nik Caner-Medley
- (United States) James Augustine
- (United States) - (Republic of the Congo) CJ Wallace
- (United States) - (Azerbaijan) Jaycee Carroll
- (United States) Demonte Harper
- (United States) Royce O'Neale
- (Dominican Republic) Eulis Báez
