= José María Martín Carpena =

Spanish politician (1950 - 2000)

José María Martín Carpena (Málaga, 1950 - Málaga, 2000) was a politician in the Partido Popular who was killed by ETA on July 15, 2000.

== Biography ==
He graduated with a degree in business administration, specializing in taxation and tax consultancy, and he also worked at the National Institute of Social Security in the Spanish Ministry of Social Affairs.

His political career began when he was appointed Councillor by the Partido Popular on April 21, 1997, succeeding Juan Manuel Moreno Bonilla who went on to serve as Deputy to the Regional Government of Andalusia. In the 1999 municipal elections, Carpena ranked number 15 in the list led by Celia Villalobos. His position as Councilman for the Partido Popular was reconfirmed as they obtained an absolute majority with 19 councillors.

=== Murder ===
He was killed at 9:40 p.m. on Saturday July 15, 2000 outside his home while travelling by official car to go to a local speech called the Proclamation of the Biznaga. Carpena was accompanied by his wife and his 17-year-old daughter, who were present during the murder. While the family was getting into the official car, the terrorist Igor Solana Matarran, who had been waiting for more than one hour for their departure, shot at him six times. Four bullets hit the politician and one struck him in the neck, fatally wounding him. Once the murder was committed, the killer escaped in another vehicle where another ETA member, Harriet Iragi Gurrutxaga, was waiting for him. Martín Carpena never received threats, which is why he did not have bodyguards with him.

The next day his body was laid in state in Malaga's City Hall, and the citizens carried out a protest against violence and terrorism. After lying in state, a funeral was held in the Cathedral of Malaga, which was attended by numerous politicians, including José María Aznar, Manuel Chaves, Ana Botella, Jaime Mayor Oreja, Jesús Posada, Javier Arenas and Mayor Francisco de la Torre.

=== Arrest of the murderers ===
Igor Solana and Harriet Iragi were arrested in Seville three months later after murdering Colonel Antonio Muñoz Cariñanos. In 2001, they were sentenced to 30 years in prison.

=== Recognition ===
The day after his murder, he was posthumously awarded the Gold Medal of the city. In September of the same year, it was decided to change the name of the Malaga City Sports Arena to the Martin Carpena Sports Arena, which it remains today. His hometown held a tribute in his honour 10 years after his death in 2010. There is also a bust in his memory in the Park of Huelin.

== Bibliography ==
- MERINO, A., CHAPA, A., Raíces de Libertad. pp. 199–209. FPEV (2011). ISBN 978-84-615-0648-4 (in spanish)
- This article makes use of material translated from the corresponding article in the Spanish-language Wikipedia.
