= 2007 Copa del Rey de Baloncesto =

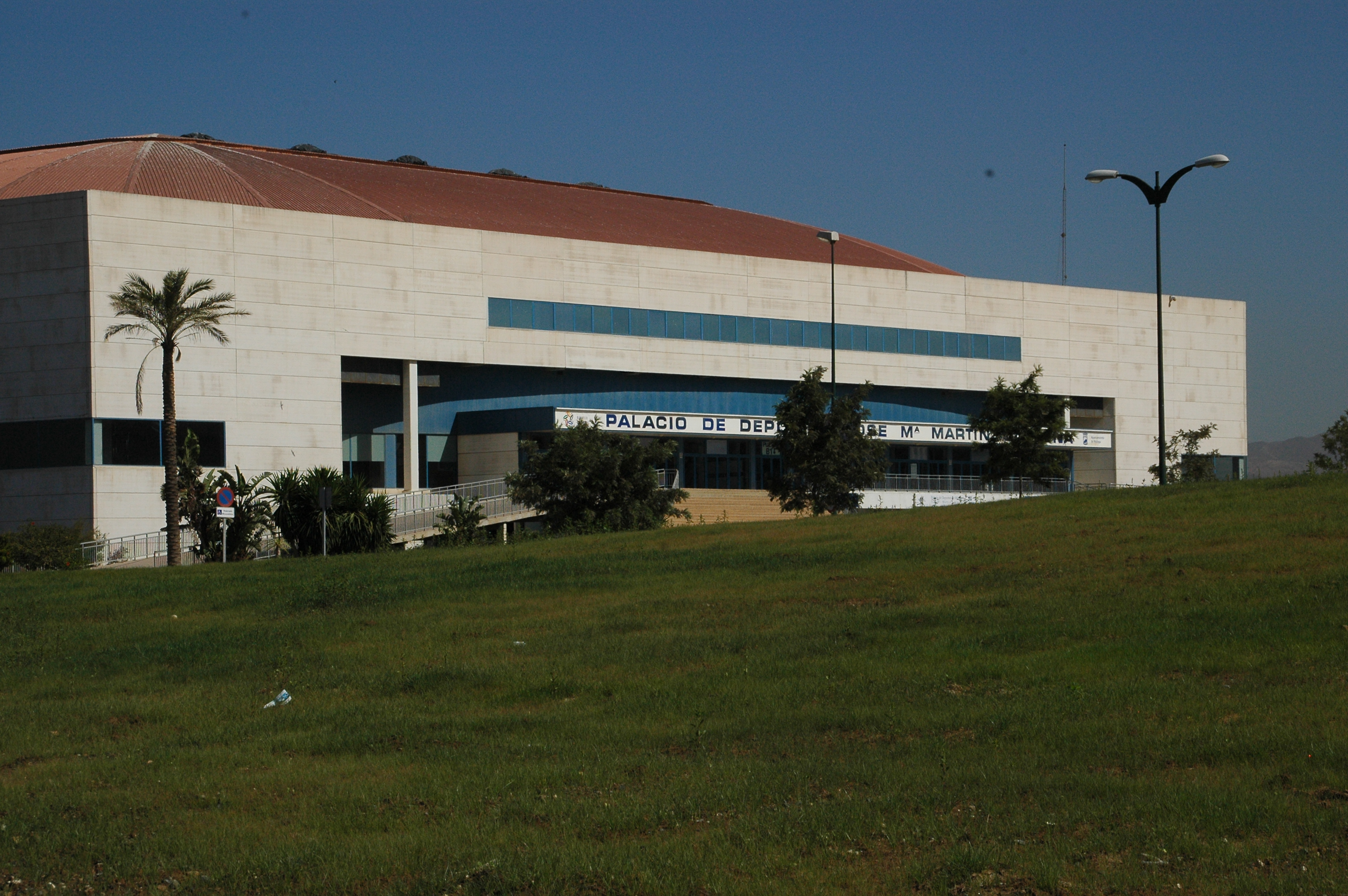
Jose Maria Martin Carpena Arena

The Copa del Rey 2006–07 was the 71st edition of the Spanish basketball Cup. It was organized by the ACB and was disputed in Málaga, Andalusia in the Jose Maria Martin Carpena Arena between days 8 and 11 of February. The winning team was Winterthur FC Barcelona.

== Brackett ==
| Quarterfinals; February 8 & 9 | | Semifinals; February 10 | | Final; February 11 |
| Akasvayu Girona | 82 |
| DKV Joventut | 84 | DKV Joventut | 70 |
| Unicaja | 62 | FC Barcelona | 84 |
| FC Barcelona | 77 | | | FC Barcelona | 69 |
| TAU Cerámica | 82 | | | Real Madrid | 53 |
| Caja San Fernando | 73 | TAU Cerámica | 72 |
| Real Madrid | 85 | Real Madrid | 74 |
| Gran Canaria | 82 |

=== Quarterfinals ===
February 8
18:30 GTM+1

Report

| Akasvayu Girona (Catalonia) | 82–84 (OT) | (Catalonia) DKV Joventut |
Scoring by quarter: 23–17, 16–20, 19–17, 17–21, Overtime: 7–9
| Pts: Šalenga 19; Rebs: Fučka 8 Asts: 6 players 2 | | Pts: Fernández, Archibald 17; Rebs: Archibald 9 Asts: Bennett 6 |

Jose Maria Martin Carpena Arena, Málaga
Attendance: 9,447
Referees: Fco. De La Maza, E. Pérez Pizarro, Redondo

February 8
21:00 GTM+1

Report

| Unicaja (Andalusia) | 62–77 | (Catalonia) Winterthur FC Barcelona |
Scoring by quarter: 10–21, 20–21, 12–13, 20–22
| Pts: Cabezas, Piètrus 12; Rebs: Three players 3 Asts: Sánchez 5 | | Pts: Trias 18; Rebs: Trias 8 Asts: Lakovič 4 |

Jose Maria Martin Carpena Arena, Málaga
Attendance: 10,000
Referees: Juan Carlos Arteaga, M.A. Pérez Pérez, José Javier Murgui

February 9
19:00 GTM+1

Report

| TAU Cerámica (Basque Country (autonomous community)) | 82–73 | (Andalusia) Caja San Fernando |
Scoring by quarter: 20–12, 24–23, 23–21, 15–17
| Pts: Scola 23; Rebs: Scola 7 Asts: Prigioni 9 | | Pts: Price 20; Rebs: Alexander 10; Asts: Marco 4 |

Jose Maria Martin Carpena Arena, Málaga
Attendance: 8,400
Referees: J.A. Martín Bertrán, Oscar Perea, Lluis Guirao

February 9
21:00 GTM+1

Report

| Real Madrid (Community of Madrid) | 85–82 | (Canary Islands) Gran Canaria Grupo Dunas |
Scoring by quarter: 22–12, 22–24, 17–23, 24–23
| Pts: Bullock 33; Rebs: Reyes 9 Asts: López 6 | | Pts: Dávid 25; Rebs: Savané 5 Asts: Fernández 5 |

Jose Maria Martin Carpena Arena, Málaga
Attendance: 10,000
Referees: Daniel Hierrezuelo, J.R. García Ortiz, Antonio Conde

=== SemiFinals ===
February 10
17:00 GTM+1

Report

| DKV Joventut (Catalonia) | 70–84 | (Catalonia) Winterthur FC Barcelona |
Scoring by quarter: 19–16, 19–20, 11–28, 21–20
| Pts: Fernández 16; Rebs: Gaines 7 Asts: Rubio 4 | | Pts: Basile, Trias 16; Rebs: Basile, Trias 7 Asts: Basile 6 |

Jose Maria Martin Carpena Arena, Málaga
Attendance: 10,000
Referees: J.A. Martín Bertrán, E. Pérez Pizarro, Redondo

February 9
19:30 GTM+1

Report

| TAU Cerámica (Basque Country (autonomous community)) | 72–74 | (Community of Madrid) Real Madrid |
Scoring by quarter: 21–19, 21–15, 18–23, 12–17
| Pts: Scola 15; Rebs: House 6 Asts: Prigioni, Splitter 3 | | Pts: Bullock 17; Rebs: Reyes 9 Asts: Tunçeri 2 |

Jose Maria Martin Carpena Arena, Málaga
Attendance: 10,000
Referees: Juan Carlos Arteaga, M.A. Pérez Pérez, Oscar Perea

=== Final ===
February 11
19:00 GTM+1

Report

| Real Madrid (Community of Madrid) | 53–69 | (Catalonia) Winterthur FC Barcelona |
Scoring by quarter: 5–21, 10–10, 20–16, 18–22
| Pts: Bullock 15; Rebs: Hervelle 13; Asts: Bulock 2 | | Pts: Lakovič 16; Rebs: Grimau 5 Asts: Lakovič 5 |

Jose Maria Martin Carpena Arena, Málaga
Attendance: 10,200
Referees: Juan Carlos Arteaga, M.A. Pérez Pérez, Daniel Hierrezuelo

Copa del Rey 2007 Champions

Winterthur Barcelona
20th title

- Copa del Rey MVP: Jordi Trias.

== Television Broadcasting ==
- TVE2 and FORTA.

== Organizer ==
- ACB and the Ayuntamiento de Málaga.

== Sponsorships ==
- Nike, Mahou-San Miguel and Winterthur Group.
