= Copa del Rey de Baloncesto =

Spanish basketball competition

Copa del Rey
- Founded: 1933; 93 years ago
- First season: 1933
- Country: Spain
- Other club from: Andorra
- Confederation: FIBA Europe
- Number of teams: 8
- Current champions: Baskonia (7th title) (2026)
- Most championships: Real Madrid (29 titles)
- TV partners: DAZN
- Website: acb.com
- 2026 Copa del Rey de Baloncesto

The Copa del Rey de Baloncesto (English: Basketball King's Cup) is an annual cup competition for Spanish basketball teams organized by Spain's top professional league, the Liga ACB.

== History ==
Originally known as the Copa de España de Baloncesto, was first played in 1933 and contested in its first editions only by teams from the provinces of Madrid and Barcelona. It was the first nationwide basketball competition played in Spain. During the Francoism, it was referred as the Copa del Generalísimo de Baloncesto, before becoming the Copa del Rey de Baloncesto in 1977.

== Format ==
Until the establishment of the ACB in 1983, the Cup was played in its latest rounds with double-legged series and its final as a single game in a neutral venue. In several seasons, there was a group stage as first round.

From 1983 and 1986, a Final Four format was adopted. The two best qualified teams from the two groups of the Liga ACB at the end of the first stage qualified for the tournament.

Since 1987, the tournament was expanded to Final Eight format has been used. Since the league is played with a round-robin single group, the top seven teams at the end of the first half of the regular season from the Spanish League and the host one, if it is not between these teams, qualify for the tournament. The eight teams play a knockout tournament at one venue, over four days, eventually producing a winner.

The Copa del Rey is one of the highlights of the Spanish sporting calendar.

== Finals ==
Year	Winner	Score	Runners-up	Venue	Location	Top scorer
Copa de España
1933	Rayo Club Madrid	21–11	Madrid CF	Jardines del Cine Goya	Madrid	(Spain) Juan Castellví
1934	Not played as a result of the boycott by Catalan teams.					
1935	Societé Patrie	23–19	Rayo Club Madrid	Parc Municipal de Montjuïc	Barcelona	(Spain) Fernando Font
1936	Rayo Club Madrid	23–20	Societé Patrie	Frontón de Recoletos	Madrid	(France) Raoul Arnaud
Copa del Generalísimo
1940	L'Hospitalet	20–17	Atlético Gracia (Note: After the Spanish Civil War, Societé Patrie changed its name to Atlético Gracia.)	Polideportivo de Sarriá	Barcelona	(Spain) Ramón Sanahuja
1941	Español	35–20	L'Hospitalet	Frontón Fiesta Alegre	Madrid	(Spain) Ramón Sanahuja
1942	Layetano	30–28	FC Barcelona	Frontón Zaragozano	Zaragoza	(Spain) Sebastián Navarrete
1943	FC Barcelona	27–25	Layetano	Frontón Balear	Palma	(Spain) Eduardo Kucharski
1944	Layetano	32–18	Real Madrid	Club de Campo	Vigo	(Spain) Eduardo Kucharski
1945	FC Barcelona	37–34	Layetano	Pista de Gran Vía	Barcelona	(Spain) Eduardo Kucharski
1946	FC Barcelona	44–35	Montgat	Plaza de toros de las Arenas	Barcelona	(Spain) Juan Ferrando
1947	FC Barcelona	39–25	Canarias de Madrid	Centro de Natación Helios	Zaragoza	(Spain) Juan Ferrando
1948	Juventud Badalona	41–32	Real Madrid	Instituto Deportivo General Yagüe	Burgos	(Spain) Andrés Oller
1949	FC Barcelona	(play-off)	Real Madrid	Palacio de Deportes del Club América	Madrid	(Spain) Andrés Oller
1950	FC Barcelona	46–39	Juventud Badalona	Plaza de toros de las Arenas	Barcelona	(Spain) Andrés Oller
1951	Real Madrid	47–36	FC Barcelona	Frontón Gros	San Sebastián	(Puerto Rico) Guillermo Galíndez
1952	Real Madrid	43–31	Juventud Badalona	Plaza de toros de Alicante	Alicante	(Puerto Rico) Guillermo Galíndez
1953	Juventud Badalona	41–39	Real Madrid	Colegio San José	Valladolid	(Spain) Ignacio Pinedo
1954	Real Madrid	56–41	Juventud Badalona	Frontón Fiesta Alegre	Madrid	(Puerto Rico) Guillermo Galíndez
1955	Juventud Badalona	59–44	Real Madrid	Pabellón del Deporte	Barcelona	(Spain) José Brunet
1956	Real Madrid	59–55	Aismalíbar	Frontón Fiesta Alegre	Madrid	(Spain) Alfonso Martínez
1957	Real Madrid	54–50	Aismalíbar	Pista de Vista Alegre	Vigo	(Spain) Alfonso Martínez
1958	Juventud Badalona	74–69	Real Madrid	Centro de Natación Helios	Zaragoza	(Spain) José Brunet
1959	FC Barcelona	50–36	Aismalíbar	Palacio de los Deportes	Barcelona	(Spain) Jorge Bonareu
1960	Real Madrid	76–64	Hesperia	Frontón Fiesta Alegre	Madrid	(United States) Travis Montgomery
1961	Real Madrid	76–51	FC Barcelona	Frontón Deportivo	Bilbao	(Spain) Emiliano Rodríguez
1962	Real Madrid	80–66	Estudiantes	Palacio de los Deportes	Barcelona	(Spain) José Ramón Ramos
1963	Estudiantes	94–90	Real Madrid	Frontón Urumea	San Sebastián	(Spain) José Ramón Ramos
1964	Picadero	63–51	Aismalíbar	Palacio dos Deportes	Lugo	(Spain) Miguel Albanell
1965	Real Madrid	102–82	Náutico Tenerife	Pabellón de Deportes	Salamanca	(Spain) Alejandro Plasencia (Spain) Lolo Sainz
1966	Real Madrid	62–61	Juventud Kalso	Pabellón del Casal Sagrada Familia	Terrassa	(Spain) Clifford Luyk
1967	Real Madrid	82–80	Kas Vitoria	Frontón Vitoriano	Vitoria-Gasteiz	(Spain) Clifford Luyk
1968	Picadero	58–55	Juventud Kalso	Pabellón de Deportes de La Arena	Gijón	(Spain) Enrique Margall
1969	Juventud Nerva	82–81	Real Madrid	Pabellón de Deportes	Ourense	(Spain) Clifford Luyk
1970	Real Madrid	102–90	Juventud Nerva	Palacio de los Deportes	León	(Spain) Clifford Luyk
1971	Real Madrid	72–63	Juventud Nerva	Pabellón de Deportes de Mendizorroza	Vitoria-Gasteiz	(Spain) Clifford Luyk (Spain) Luis Miguel Santillana
1972	Real Madrid	92–77	Juventud Schweppes	Palacio de Deportes de Riazor	A Coruña	(Spain) Emiliano Rodríguez
1973	Real Madrid	123–79	Estudiantes Monteverde	Pabellón Polideportivo de La Salle	Paterna	(Spain) Clifford Luyk
1974	Real Madrid	87–85	Juventud Schweppes	Pabellón de Deportes	Alicante	(Spain) Miguel Ángel Estrada
1975	Real Madrid	114–85	Estudiantes Monteverde	Pabellón Polideportivo	Jaén	(Spain) Gonzalo Sagi-Vela
1976	Juventud Schweppes	99–88	Real Madrid	Pabellón Municipal	Cartagena	(Spain) Wayne Brabender
Copa del Rey
1977	Real Madrid	97–71	FC Barcelona	Nuevo Palacio de Deportes	Palma	(Spain) Wayne Brabender
1978	FC Barcelona	103–96	Real Madrid	Pabellón Municipal	Zaragoza	(United States) Bob Guyette
1979	FC Barcelona	130–113	Tempus	Polideportivo Anaitasuna	Pamplona	(Spain) Chicho Sibilio
1980	FC Barcelona	92–83	Manresa EB	Pavillón Municipal de Punta Arnela	Ferrol	(United States) Bob Fullarton
1981	FC Barcelona	106–90	Real Madrid	Pabellón Municipal	Almería	(Spain) Epi
1982	FC Barcelona	110–108	Real Madrid	Polideportivo Entrepuentes	Badajoz	(Spain) Chicho Sibilio
1983	FC Barcelona	125–93	Inmobanco	Pabellón Municipal de Deportes	Palencia	(Spain) Epi
1984	CAI Zaragoza	81–78	FC Barcelona	Pabellón Municipal	Zaragoza	(Spain) Epi
1985	Real Madrid	90–76	Ron Negrita Joventut	Pavelló Club Joventut Badalona	Badalona	(Spain) Fernando Martín
1986	Real Madrid	87–79	Ron Negrita Joventut	Palau Blaugrana	Barcelona	(Spain) Jordi Villacampa
1987	FC Barcelona	110–102	Ron Negrita Joventut	Palacio Municipal de Deportes	Santa Cruz de Tenerife	(United States) Wallace Bryant
1988	FC Barcelona	84–83	Real Madrid	Pabellón Polideportivo Pisuerga	Valladolid	(United States) Wendell Alexis
1989	Real Madrid	85–81	FC Barcelona	Pazo dos Deportes de Riazor	A Coruña	(Socialist Federal Republic of Yugoslavia) Dražen Petrović
Year	Winner	Score	Runners-up	Venue	Location	MVP
1990	CAI Zaragoza	76–69	Ram Joventut	Centro Insular de Deportes	Las Palmas	(United States) Mark Davis
1991	FC Barcelona Banca Catalana	67–65	Estudiantes Caja Postal	Pabellón Príncipe Felipe	Zaragoza	(Spain) Juan Antonio Orenga
1992	Estudiantes Caja Postal	61–56	CAI Zaragoza	Palacio de Deportes	Granada	(United States) John Pinone
1993	Real Madrid Teka	74–71	Marbella Joventut	Coliseum da Coruña	A Coruña (2)	(United States) Joe Arlauckas
1994	FC Barcelona Banca Catalana	86–75	Taugrés	Palacio San Pablo	Sevilla	(Croatia) Velimir Perasović
1995	Taugrés	88–80	Amway Zaragoza	Palacio de Deportes (2)	Granada (2)	(Spain) Pablo Laso
1996	TDK Manresa	94–92	FC Barcelona Banca Catalana	Palacio de Deportes	Murcia	(Spain) Joan Creus
1997	Festina Joventut	79–71	Cáceres	Palacio de los Deportes	León	(United States) Andre Turner
1998	Pamesa Valencia	87–75	Pinturas Bruguer Badalona	Pabellón Polideportivo Pisuerga (2)	Valladolid (2)	(Spain) Nacho Rodilla
1999	Tau Cerámica	70–61	Caja San Fernando	Pabellón Fuente de San Luis	Valencia	(United States) Elmer Bennett
2000	Adecco Estudiantes	73–63	Pamesa Valencia	Fernando Buesa Arena	Vitoria-Gasteiz	(Spain) Alfonso Reyes
2001	FC Barcelona	80–77	Real Madrid Teka	Palacio Martín Carpena	Málaga	(Spain) Pau Gasol
2002	Tau Cerámica	85–83	FC Barcelona	Fernando Buesa Arena (2)	Vitoria-Gasteiz (2)	(Federal Republic of Yugoslavia) Dejan Tomašević
2003	FC Barcelona	84–78	Tau Cerámica	Pabellón Fuente de San Luis (2)	Valencia (2)	(Serbia and Montenegro) Dejan Bodiroga
2004	Tau Cerámica	81–77	DKV Joventut	Palacio San Pablo (2)	Sevilla (2)	(Spain) Rudy Fernández
2005	Unicaja	80–76	Real Madrid	Pabellón Príncipe Felipe (2)	Zaragoza (2)	(Spain) Jorge Garbajosa
2006	Tau Cerámica	85–80	Pamesa Valencia	Palacio de los Deportes	Madrid	(Argentina) Pablo Prigioni
2007	Winterthur FC Barcelona	69–53	Real Madrid	Palacio Martín Carpena (2)	Málaga (2)	(Spain) Jordi Trias
2008	DKV Joventut	82–80	Tau Cerámica	Fernando Buesa Arena (3)	Vitoria-Gasteiz (3)	(Spain) Rudy Fernández (2)
2009	Tau Cerámica	100–98	Unicaja	Palacio de los Deportes (2)	Madrid (2)	(Bosnia and Herzegovina) Mirza Teletović
2010	Regal FC Barcelona	80–61	Real Madrid	Bizkaia Arena	Bilbao	(Spain) Fran Vázquez
2011	Regal FC Barcelona	68–60	Real Madrid	Palacio de los Deportes (3)	Madrid (3)	(United States) Alan Anderson
2012	Real Madrid	91–74	FC Barcelona Regal	Palau Sant Jordi	Barcelona	(Spain) Sergio Llull
2013	FC Barcelona Regal	85–69	Valencia Basket	Fernando Buesa Arena (4)	Vitoria-Gasteiz (4)	(United States) Pete Mickeal
2014	Real Madrid	77–76	FC Barcelona	Palacio Martín Carpena (3)	Málaga (3)	(Spain) Nikola Mirotić
2015	Real Madrid	77–71	FC Barcelona	Gran Canaria Arena	Las Palmas (2)	(Spain) Rudy Fernández (3)
2016	Real Madrid	85–81	Herbalife Gran Canaria	Coliseum da Coruña (2)	A Coruña (3)	(Mexico) Gustavo Ayón
2017	Real Madrid	97–95	Valencia Basket	Fernando Buesa Arena (5)	Vitoria-Gasteiz (5)	(Spain) Sergio Llull (2)
2018	FC Barcelona Lassa	92–90	Real Madrid	Gran Canaria Arena (2)	Las Palmas (3)	(France) Thomas Heurtel
2019	Barça Lassa	94–93	Real Madrid	Palacio de los Deportes (4)	Madrid (4)	(France) Thomas Heurtel (2)
2020	Real Madrid	95–68	Unicaja	Palacio Martín Carpena (4)	Málaga (4)	(Argentina) Facundo Campazzo
2021	Barça	88–73	Real Madrid	Palacio de los Deportes (5)	Madrid (5)	(United States) Cory Higgins
2022	Barça	64–59	Real Madrid	Palacio de Deportes (2)	Granada (2)	(Spain) Nikola Mirotić (2)
2023	Unicaja	83–80	Lenovo Tenerife	Palau Municipal d'Esports de Badalona	Badalona (2)	(United States) Tyson Carter
2024	Real Madrid	96–85	Barça	Palacio Martín Carpena (5)	Málaga (5)	(Argentina) Facundo Campazzo (2)
2025	Unicaja	93–79	Real Madrid	Gran Canaria Arena (3)	Las Palmas (4)	(Montenegro) Kendrick Perry
2026	Kosner Baskonia	100–89	Real Madrid	Roig Arena	Valencia (3)	(United States) Trent Forrest

== Titles by team ==
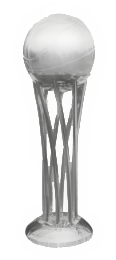
Current trophy

Team	Winners	Runners-up	Winning years
Real Madrid	29	25	1951, 1952, 1954, 1956, 1957, 1960, 1961, 1962, 1965, 1966, 1967, 1970, 1971, 1972, 1973, 1974, 1975, 1977, 1985, 1986, 1989, 1993, 2012, 2014, 2015, 2016, 2017, 2020, 2024
Barcelona	27	12	1943, 1945, 1946, 1947, 1949, 1950, 1959, 1978, 1979, 1980, 1981, 1982, 1983, 1987, 1988, 1991, 1994, 2001, 2003, 2007, 2010, 2011, 2013, 2018, 2019, 2021, 2022
Joventut	8	16	1948, 1953, 1955, 1958, 1969, 1976, 1997, 2008
Baskonia	7	3	1995, 1999, 2002, 2004, 2006, 2009, 2026
Estudiantes	3	4	1963, 1992, 2000
Málaga	3	2	2005, 2023, 2025
Laietà	2	2	1942, 1944
Zaragoza	2	2	1984, 1990
Rayo Club Madrid	2	1	1933, 1936
Picadero	2	0	1964, 1968
Valencia Basket	1	4	1998
Societé Patrie	1	2	1935
L'Hospitalet	1	1	1940
Manresa	1	1	1996
Espanyol	1	0	1941
Aismalíbar	0	4	
Inmobanco	0	2	
Montgat	0	1	
Canarias de Madrid	0	1	
Hesperia	0	1	
Náutico Tenerife	0	1	
Kas Vitoria	0	1	
Cáceres	0	1	
Sevilla	0	1	
Gran Canaria	0	1	
Canarias	0	1	

== See also ==
- Liga de Verano ACB
