= 1999 Copa del Rey de Baloncesto =

The 1999 Copa del Rey was the 63rd edition of the Spanish basketball Cup. It was organized by the ACB and was held in Valencia at the Pabellón Municipal Fuente de San Luis between January 29 and February 1, 1999. The winning team was TAU Cerámica.

== Bracket ==
Quarterfinals; January 29, 30		Semifinals; January 31		Final; February 1
FC Barcelona Banca Catalana	87
Unicaja Málaga	72	FC Barcelona Banca Catalana	79
Pamesa Valencia	57	Caja San Fernando	85
Caja San Fernando	58			Caja San Fernando	61
Real Madrid	89			TAU Cerámica	70
Baloncesto Fuenlabrada	69	Real Madrid Teka	74
Tau Cerámica	76	TAU Cerámica	78
Pinturas Bruguer Badalona	73

== Final ==
February 1
20:30 GTM+1

Box Score

Caja San Fernando	61–70	TAU Cerámica
Scoring by half: 32-28, 28-42
Pts: Turner 19; Rebs: Romero 9 Asts: Turner 5 PIR: Romero 21		Pts: Berić 19; Rebs: Bonner 9 Asts: Bennett, Berić 4 PIR: Berić 22

Pabellón Municipal Fuente de San Luis, Valencia
Attendance: 7,800
Referees: Betancor, Ramos, Martín Bertrán

Copa del Rey 1999 Champions
TAU Cerámica
2nd title

- MVP of the Tournament: (United States) Elmer Bennett

== See also ==
- ACB
- Copa del Rey de Baloncesto
