= 2002 Copa del Rey de Baloncesto =

The Copa del Rey 2001-02 was the 66th edition of the Spanish basketball Cup. It was organized by the ACB and was held in Vitoria-Gasteiz at the Fernando Buesa Arena between 14 and 17 March 2002. The winning team was TAU Cerámica.

== Brackett ==
Quarterfinals; March 14, 15		Semifinals; March 16		Final; March 17
TAU Cerámica	74
DKV Joventut	72	TAU Cerámica	83
Unicaja	73	Unicaja	72
Pamesa Valencia	59			TAU Cerámica	85
FC Barcelona	73			FC Barcelona	83
Caja San Fernando	66	FC Barcelona	88
Real Madrid	75	Adecco Estudiantes	68
Adecco Estudiantes	78

== Final ==
February 17
18:00 GTM+1

Box Score

TAU Cerámica	85–83	FC Barcelona
Scoring by quarter: 18-16, 20-19, 17-23, 26-19
Pts: Tomašević 20; Rebs: Tomašević 8 Asts: Bennett 6 PIR: Tomašević 34		Pts: Jasikevičius 28; Rebs: Dueñas 6 Asts: Jasikevičius, Karnišovas 4 PIR: Jasikevičius 30

Fernando Buesa Arena, Vitoria-Gasteiz
Attendance: 9,350
Referees: Ramos, De La Maza, Guirao

Copa del Rey 2004 Champions

TAU Cerámica
3rd title

- MVP of the Tournament: (Federal Republic of Yugoslavia) Dejan Tomašević

== See also ==
- ACB
- Copa del Rey de Baloncesto
