= 2003 Copa del Rey de Baloncesto =

The Copa del Rey 2002-03 was the 66th edition of the Spanish basketball Cup. It was organized by the ACB and was held in Valencia at the Pabellón Municipal Fuente de San Luis between 20 and 23 February 2003. The winning team was FC Barcelona after defeating defending champions Tau Cerámica after an overtime.

== Brackett ==
Quarterfinals; February 20, 21		Semifinals; February 22		Final; February 23
Pamesa Valencia	81
Auna Gran Canaria	70	Pamesa Valencia	51
Adecco Estudiantes	74	TAU Cerámica	56
Saski Baskonia	81			TAU Cerámica	78
FC Barcelona	72			FC Barcelona	84
Real Madrid	59	FC Barcelona	78
Unicaja	77	Unicaja	77
DKV Joventut	75

== Final ==
Sportmania (Spain)

February 17
18:00 GTM+1

Box Score

TAU Cerámica	78–84 (OT)	FC Barcelona
Scoring by quarter: 10-23, 14-11, 24-19, 21-16, Overtime: 9-15
Pts: Bennett 18; Rebs: Scola 12; Asts: Bennett 4 PIR: Bennett 15		Pts: Dueñas 18; Rebs: Dueñas 17; Asts: Bodirgoa 7 PIR: Dueñas 27

Pabellón Municipal Fuente de San Luis, Valencia
Attendance: 8,500
Referees: Betancor, Martín Bertrán, Requena

Copa del Rey 2004 Champions

FC Barcelona
19th title

- MVP of the Tournament: (Federal Republic of Yugoslavia) Dejan Bodiroga

== See also ==
- ACB
- Copa del Rey de Baloncesto
