= Berdi Pérez =

Spanish basketball player

Bernardino Pérez Maza, commonly known as Berdi Pérez, is a retired professional basketball player. He was the General Manager of Real Betis Baloncesto of the Spanish Liga ACB. He played for C.B. Gran Canaria in the late 1980s and was appointed as the General Manager on June 6, 2012.
