= 2005 Copa del Rey de Baloncesto =

Spanish basketball competition

The 2005 Copa del Rey was the 69th edition of the Spanish basketball Cup. It was organized by the ACB and was disputed in Zaragoza in the Pabellón Príncipe Felipe between days 17 and 20 of February. The winning team was Unicaja.

== Brackett ==
Quarterfinals; February 17 & 18		Semifinals; February 19		Final; February 20
Etosa Alicante	62
Unicaja	79	Unicaja	90
Winterthur Barcelona	76	Pamesa Valencia	82
Pamesa Valencia	83			Unicaja	80
TAU Cerámica	77			Real Madrid	76
Gran Canaria	75	TAU Cerámica	77
Real Madrid	86	Real Madrid	80
Adecco Estudiantes	76

== Quarterfinals ==
February 17
18:00 GTM+1

Report

Etosa Alicante (Valencian Community)	62–79	(Andalusia) Unicaja
Scoring by quarter: 18-23, 11-19, 17-23, 16-14
Pts: Lewis 22; Rebs: de Miguel 8 Asts: Hernández 2		Pts: Herrmann 17; Rebs: Tabak 7 Asts: Sánchez 7

Pabellón Príncipe Felipe, Zaragoza
Attendance: 8,900
Referees: Juan Carlos Arteaga, M.A. Pérez Pérez, Oscar Perea

February 17
20:15 GTM+1

Report

Winterthur FC Barcelona (Catalonia)	76–83	(Valencian Community) Pamesa Valencia
Scoring by quarter: 21-20, 17-24, 17-18, 21-21
Pts: Navarro 26; Rebs: Davis, Žižić 5 Asts: de la Fuente, Fučka 3		Pts: Rakočević 23; Rebs: Oberto 11; Asts: Three players 3

Pabellón Príncipe Felipe, Zaragoza
Attendance: 8,900
Referees: Eduardo Sancha, Fco. De La Maza, José Javier Murgui

February 18
18:00 GTM+1

Report

TAU Cerámica (Basque Country (autonomous community))	77–75	(Canary Islands) Gran Canaria Grupo Dunas
Scoring by quarter: 23-14, 15-21, 18-23, 21-17
Pts: Calderón, Macijauskas 18; Rebs: Scola 10; Asts: Macijauskas 6		Pts: Keys, McDonald 16; Rebs: Savané 8 Asts: Savané 4

Pabellón Príncipe Felipe, Zaragoza
Attendance: 9,700
Referees: Juan Carlos Mitjana, J.R. García Ortiz, Antonio Conde

February 18
20:15 GTM+1

Report

Real Madrid (Community of Madrid)	86–76	(Community of Madrid) Adecco Estudiantes
Scoring by quarter: 26-20, 11-24, 24-18, 25-14
Pts: Bullock 23; Rebs: Fotsis 10; Asts: Bennett, Sonko 4		Pts: Jiménez 13; Rebs: Garcés 11; Asts: Jasen 3

Pabellón Príncipe Felipe, Zaragoza
Attendance: 10,644
Referees: Mateo Ramos, J.A. Martín Bertrán, Daniel Hierrezuelo

== Semifinals ==
February 19
17:00 GTM+1

Report

Pamesa Valencia (Valencian Community)	82–90	(Andalusia) Unicaja
Scoring by quarter: 19-20, 28-19, 17-19, 18-32
Pts: Rakočević 27; Rebs: Tomašević 9 Asts: Rakočević 4		Pts: Herrmann 30; Rebs: Garbajosa 10; Asts: Cabezas 3

Pabellón Príncipe Felipe, Zaragoza
Attendance: 10,644
Referees: Mateo Ramos, Fco. De La Maza, Oscar Perea

February 19
19:30 GTM+1

Report

TAU Cerámica (Basque Country (autonomous community))	77–80	(Community of Madrid) Real Madrid
Scoring by quarter: 23-23, 13-22, 22-12, 19-23
Pts: Scola 20; Rebs: Dávid 8 Asts: Calderón 5		Pts: Bullock 20; Rebs: Burke 10; Asts: Bullock 4

Pabellón Príncipe Felipe, Zaragoza
Attendance: 10,644
Referees: Juan Carlos Mitjana, Daniel Hierrezuelo, Antonio Conde

== Final ==
February 20
19:30 GTM+1

Report

Unicaja (Andalusia)	80–76	(Community of Madrid) Real Madrid
Scoring by quarter: 23-14, 17-20, 13-18, 27-24
Pts: Garbajosa, Bremer 17; Rebs: Garbajosa 5 Asts: Garbajosa 4		Pts: Bullock 28; Rebs: Gelabale 6 Asts: Sonko, Bullock 2

Pabellón Príncipe Felipe, Zaragoza
Attendance: 10,644
Referees: J.A. Martín Bertrán, Juan Carlos Arteaga, M.A. Pérez Pérez

Copa del Rey 2005 Champions
Unicaja
1st title

- MVP of the Tournament: Jorge Garbajosa

== See also ==
- Liga ACB
- Copa del Rey de Baloncesto
