= 2023 Copa del Rey de Baloncesto =

87th edition of the Spanish Basketball King's Cup

2023 Copa del Rey

Tournament details
- Country: Spain
- City: Badalona
- Venue: Palau Municipal d'Esports
- Dates: 16–19 February 2023
- Teams: 8
- Defending champions: Barça

Final positions
- Champions: Unicaja (2nd title)
- Runners-up: Lenovo Tenerife
- Semifinalists: Real Madrid; Joventut

Tournament statistics
- Matches played: 7
- Attendance: 74,665 (10,666 per match)

Awards
- MVP: Tyson Carter (Unicaja)
- All statistics correct as of 19 February 2023.

The 2023 Copa del Rey de Baloncesto was the 87th edition of the Spanish Basketball King's Cup. It was managed by the ACB and was held in Badalona, in the Palau Municipal d'Esports in February 2023.

Barça were the defending champions, but were eliminated by Unicaja in the quarterfinals, who went on to win the cup for their 2nd overall.

All times are in Central European Time (UTC+01:00).

== Qualified teams ==
The top seven ranking teams after the first half of the 2022–23 ACB regular season qualified to the tournament. As Joventut, host team, finished between the seven first teams, the eighth qualified entered in the Copa del Rey.

Pos	Team	Pld	W	L	PF	PA	PD	Qualification
1	Real Madrid	17	14	3	1490	1285	+205	Qualification as seeded team
2	Barça	17	14	3	1429	1245	+184	Qualification as seeded team
3	Lenovo Tenerife	17	13	4	1401	1228	+173	Qualification as seeded team
4	Cazoo Baskonia	17	13	4	1540	1405	+135	Qualification as seeded team
5	Unicaja	17	12	5	1475	1290	+185	Qualification as unseeded team
6	Gran Canaria	17	10	7	1424	1350	+74	Qualification as unseeded team
7	Joventut (H)	17	10	7	1409	1359	+50	Qualification as unseeded team
8	Valencia Basket	17	9	8	1466	1434	+32	Qualification as unseeded team

Source: ACB
Rules for classification: 1) Win–loss record; 2) Point difference; 3) Points scored; 4) Sum of quotients of points scored; 5) Previous season standings position.
(H) Hosts

== Venue ==
On May 16, 2022, ACB selected and announced Badalona to host the Copa del Rey in February 2023. The arena is primarily used for basketball, though it is also an habitual home for music concerts and other municipal events. The arena was built in 1991, it was opened in 1992 with a basketball game between Catalonia and Croatia; where Croatians won by 118-82 led with 30 points of Toni Kukoč and 21 point of Dražen Petrović. The arena hosted the basketball tournament of the 1992 Summer Olympics, the 1992 Olympic Basketball Tournament. It was designed by the architects Esteve Bonell and Francesc Rius, who won the 1992 European Union Prize for Contemporary Architecture for this building. It is also the home arena of Joventut, one of the most important professional basketball squads in Spain. Before the Pavelló Olímpic was built, the now 3,300 capacity Pavelló Club Joventut Badalona hosted the city basketball games and most of the other indoor sports.

Badalona	2023 Copa del Rey de Baloncesto (Spain)
Palau Municipal d'Esports	2023 Copa del Rey de Baloncesto (Spain)
Capacity: 12,760	2023 Copa del Rey de Baloncesto (Spain)

== Draw ==
The draw was held on 23 January 2023 in Badalona, Spain. The top four ranking teams act as seeded teams in the draw of the quarterfinals. For its part, the top ranked team played its quarterfinal match on Thursday.

== Bracket ==
Quarterfinals
Joventut	94
Cazoo Baskonia	81
Lenovo Tenerife	89
Gran Canaria	73
Real Madrid	86
Valencia Basket	85
Barça	87
Unicaja	89

Semifinals
Joventut	72
Lenovo Tenerife	73
Real Madrid	82
Unicaja	93

Final
Lenovo Tenerife	80
Unicaja	83

== Quarterfinals ==
=== Real Madrid vs. Valencia Basket ===
16 February 2023	Real Madrid	86–85	Valencia Basket	Badalona
18:30	Scoring by quarter: 21–13, 20–21, 22–24, 23–27
	Pts: Deck 19; Rebs: Deck 9 Asts: Hanga 4 PIR: Deck 26	Boxscore	Pts: Jones 20; Rebs: Claver, Dubljević 5 Asts: Jones 5 PIR: Jones 17	Arena: Palau Municipal d'Esports; Attendance: 9,218; Referees: Emilio Pérez Pizarro, Óscar Perea, Joaquín García

=== Barça vs. Unicaja ===
16 February 2023	Barça	87–89(OT)	Unicaja	Badalona
21:30	Scoring by quarter: 21–20, 20–14, 14–16, 21–26, Overtime: 11–13
	Pts: Mirotić 15; Rebs: Mirotić 9 Asts: Veselý 5 PIR: Satoranský, Mirotić 14	Boxscore	Pts: Brizuela 27; Rebs: Perry 6 Asts: Thomas 6 PIR: Perry 27	Arena: Palau Municipal d'Esports; Attendance: 10,147; Referees: Carlos Peruga, Fernando Calatrava, Jorge Martínez

=== Lenovo Tenerife vs. Gran Canaria ===
17 February 2023	Lenovo Tenerife	89–73	Gran Canaria	Badalona
18:30	Scoring by quarter: 30–25, 25–13, 17–20, 17–15
	Pts: Fernández 26; Rebs: Guerra 5 Asts: Huertas 6 PIR: Fernández 24	Boxscore	Pts: Shurna 18; Rebs: Diop 7 Asts: Brussino 7 PIR: Shurna 19	Arena: Palau Municipal d'Esports; Attendance: 9,386; Referees: Daniel Hierrezuelo, Benjamín Jiménez, Alfonso Olivares

=== Joventut vs. Cazoo Baskonia ===
17 February 2023	Joventut	94–81	Cazoo Baskonia	Badalona
21:30	Scoring by quarter: 14–19, 21–23, 33–15, 26–24
	Pts: Tomić 18; Rebs: three players 5 Asts: Guy 6 PIR: Tomić 21	Boxscore	Pts: Giedraitis 13; Rebs: Costello 6 Asts: Thompson 8 PIR: Costello, Sedekerskis 16	Arena: Palau Municipal d'Esports; Attendance: 11,075; Referees: Antonio Conde, Martín Caballero, Rafael Serrano

== Semifinals ==
=== Real Madrid vs. Unicaja ===
18 February 2023	Real Madrid	82–93	Unicaja	Badalona
18:30	Scoring by quarter: 19–17, 20–22, 20–27, 23–27
	Pts: Tavares 19; Rebs: Deck 6 Asts: Rodríguez 3 PIR: Tavares 26	Boxscore	Pts: Kravish 20; Rebs: Kravish, Kalinoski 6 Asts: Carter 5 PIR: Kravish 24	Arena: Palau Municipal d'Esports; Attendance: 11,547; Referees: Antonio Conde, Óscar Perea, Rafael Serrano

=== Joventut vs. Lenovo Tenerife ===
18 February 2023	Joventut	72–73	Lenovo Tenerife	Badalona
21:30	Scoring by quarter: 27–23, 17–17, 15–17, 13–16
	Pts: Parra 26; Rebs: Ellenson 8 Asts: Guy, Ribas 2 PIR: Parra 26	Boxscore	Pts: Huertas 15; Rebs: Doornekamp 10; Asts: Huertas, Fernández 4 PIR: Shermadini 19	Arena: Palau Municipal d'Esports; Attendance: 11,834; Referees: Daniel Hierrezuelo, Emilio Pérez Pizarro, Benjamín Jiménez

== Final ==
19 February 2023	Lenovo Tenerife	80–83	Unicaja	Badalona
19:00	Scoring by quarter: 16–17, 23–20, 21–23, 20–23
	Pts: Huertas 21; Rebs: Shermadini 9 Asts: Huertas 10; PIR: Shermadini 31	Boxscore	Pts: Carter 17; Rebs: Kalinoski 9 Asts: Díaz 9 PIR: Carter 17	Arena: Palau Municipal d'Esports; Attendance: 11,458; Referees: Emilio Pérez Pizarro, Benjamín Jiménez, Fernando Calatrava

2023 Copa del Rey champions
Unicaja
2nd title
