= Palacio de Deportes José María Martín Carpena =

Indoor sporting arena in Málaga, Spain

Jose María Martín Carpena Arena
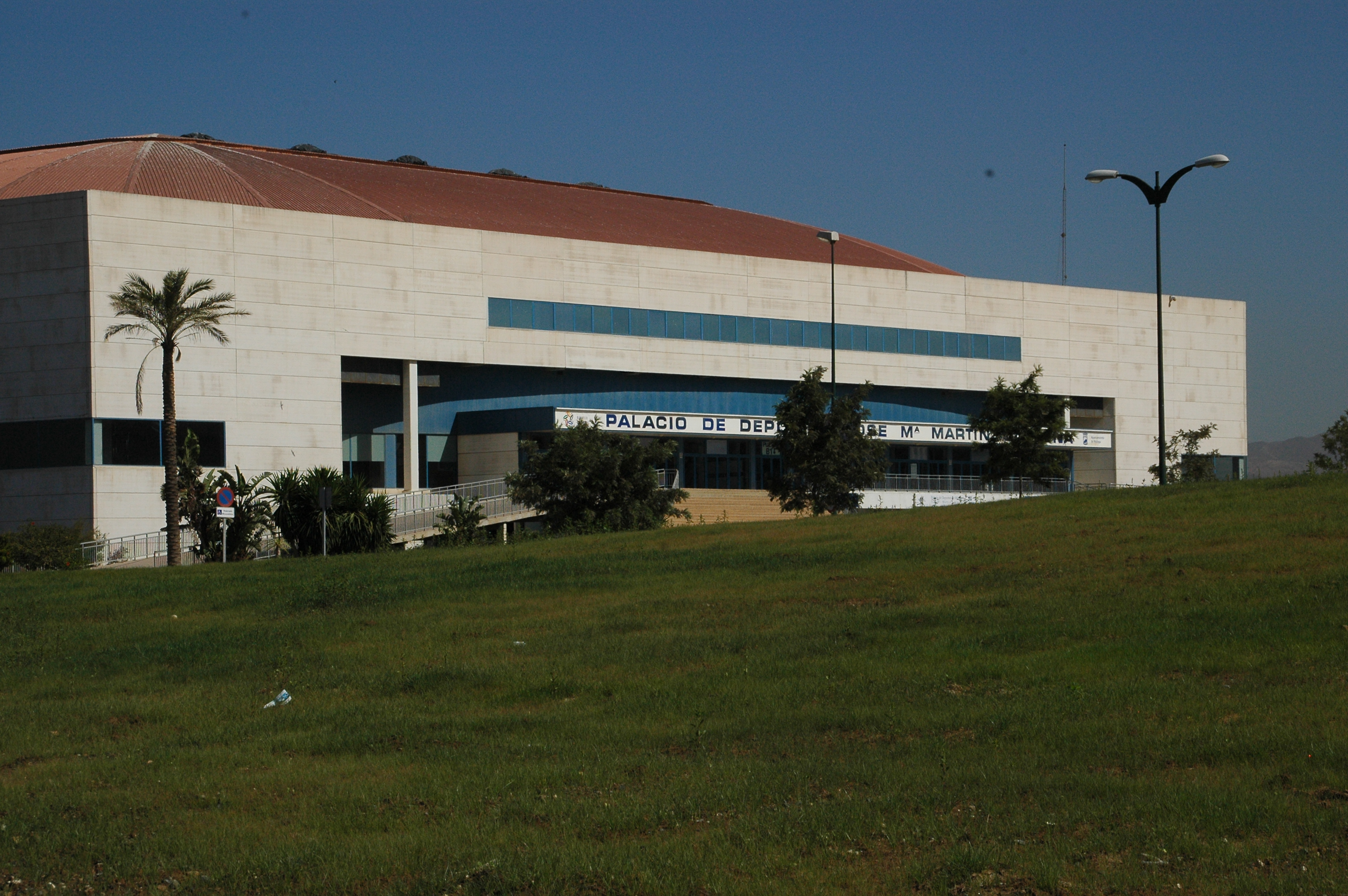
- Interactive map of Jose María Martín Carpena Arena
- Full name: Palacio de Deportes José María Martín Carpena
- Former names: Palacio de Deportes de Málaga (1999–2000)
- Location: Avenida Miguel Mérida Nicolich 2, 29004 Málaga, Spain
- Coordinates: 36°40′56.88″N 4°27′38.26″W
- Capacity: Large concerts: 10,000; Basketball: 11,300; Boxing: 11,300

Construction
- Opened: 1999
- Renovated: 2010, 2011
- Expanded: 2010

Tenant
- Unicaja Málaga (1999–present)

Palacio de Deportes José María Martín Carpena (Jose Maria Martin Carpena Arena) is an indoor sporting arena that is located in Málaga, Spain. The current seating capacity of the arena is 11,300 for sports, and 10,000 for large concert events.

== History ==
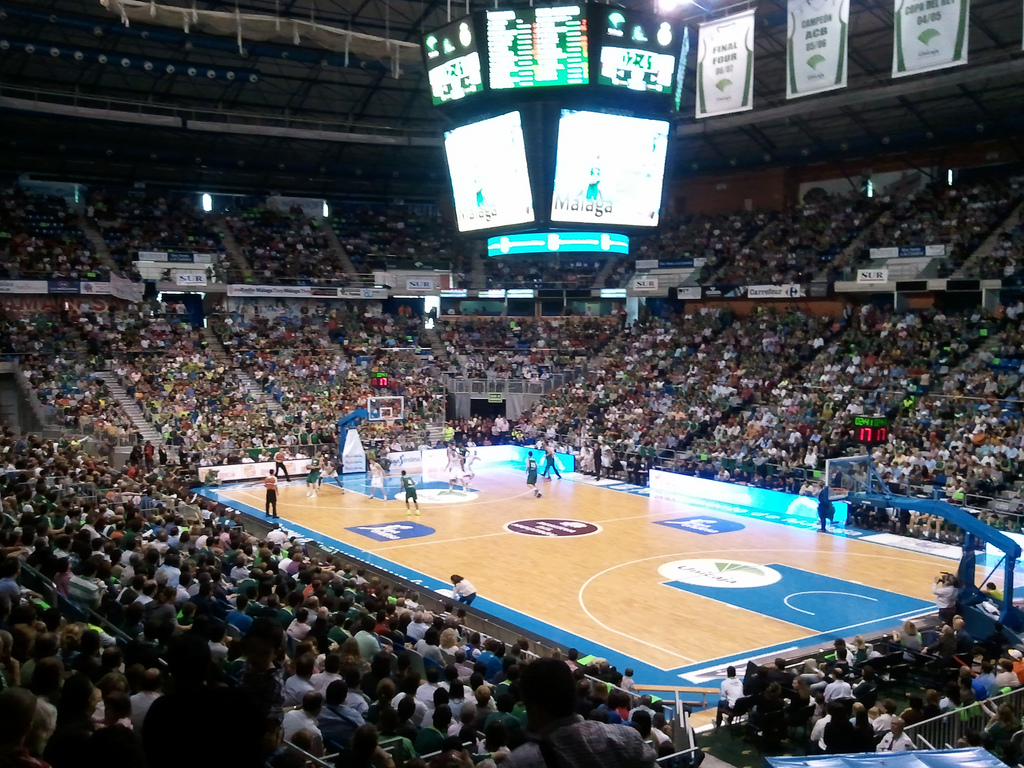
The arena, with its new scoreboard, during a basketball game in November 2011.

Martín Carpena arena opened in 1999. It has been the long-time home arena to one of Spain's top basketball teams, Unicaja Málaga, of the Liga ACB.

The arena originally had a seating capacity of 9,743 spectators, and an area of around 22,000 square meters. In 2007, a project was proposed to expand the capacity of the venue to 17,000 spectators, due to the high demand for seats and tickets by fans of Unicaja Málaga. Ultimately, the expansion project was approved, but to a new capacity of 13,000 spectators, rather than the originally planned 17,000. The expansion project was then scheduled to be completed in separate phases. The first expansion phase, which was completed in 2010, increased the seating capacity from 9,743 to 11,300. The next expansion phase will increase it to 13,000.

== See also ==
- List of indoor arenas in Spain
- José María Martín Carpena

Preceded by Madrid Arena	Davis Cup; Finals Venue; 2022 – 2024	Succeeded by Unipol Arena
