= Asociación de Clubs de Baloncesto =

Governing body of basketball in Spain

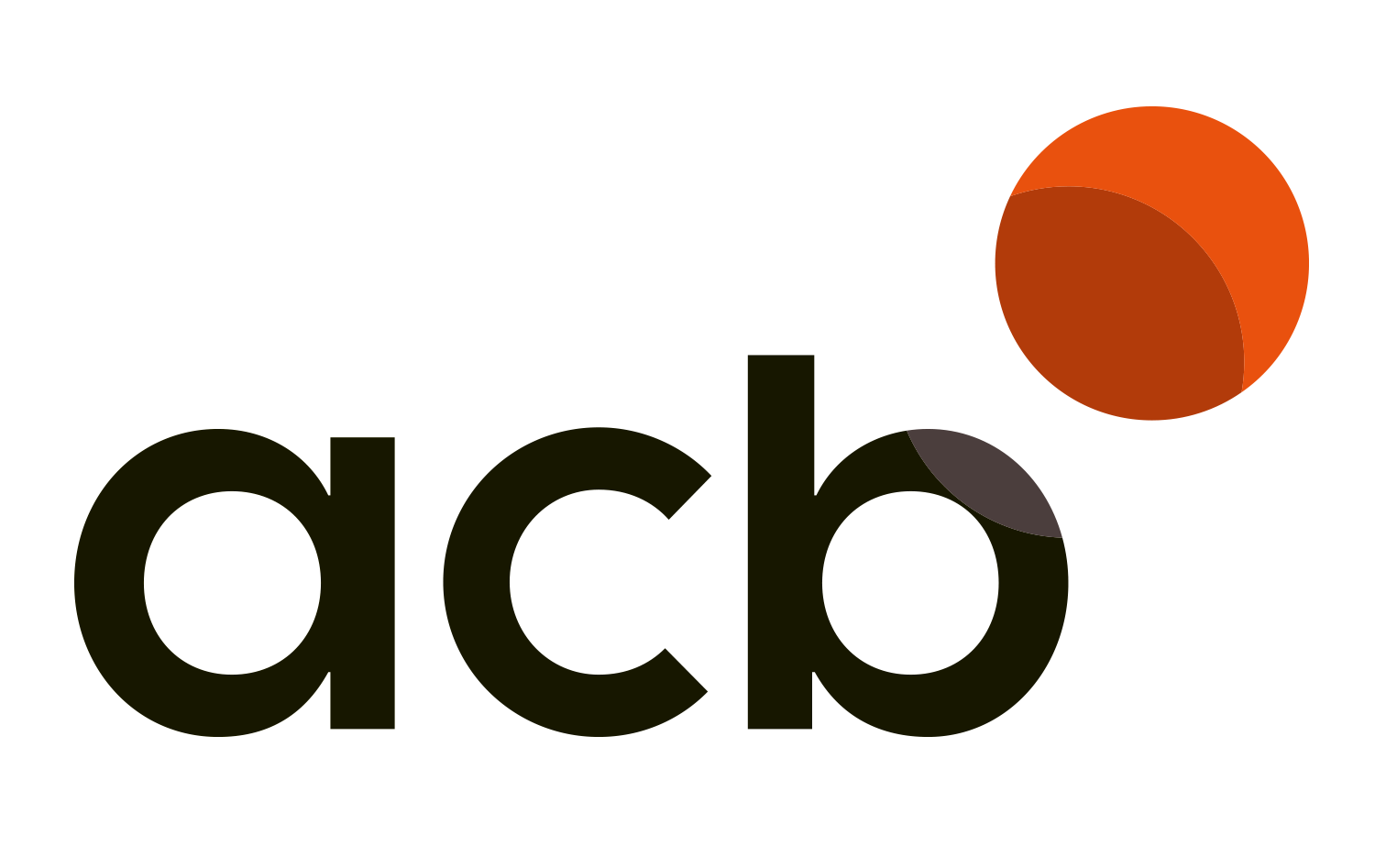
- Abbreviation: ACB
- Formation: March 3, 1982; 44 years ago
- Type: Sports association
- Headquarters: Barcelona, Spain
- Region served: Spain
- Members: 18 basketball clubs
- President: Antonio Martín
- Director general: José Miguel Calleja
- Main organ: General Assembly
- Affiliations: Union of European Leagues of Basketball
- Website: www.acb.com

The Asociación de Clubes Españoles de Baloncesto (Note: Spanish pronunciation: [asoθjaˈθjon de ˈkluβes espaˈɲoles ðe βalonˈθesto].) (Spanish Basketball Clubs Association), more commonly known as the Asociación de Clubs de Baloncesto (ACB), is a national sports association responsible for administering the Liga Endesa, the main professional basketball league in Spain. The organisation was founded in 1982.

== Competition ==
The 18 member clubs of the ACB are grouped into the Liga Endesa. In any given season a club plays each of the others in the same division twice, once at their home stadium and once at that of their opponents. This makes for a total of 34 games played each season in Liga Endesa.

Clubs gain one point for a win, no points for a defeat. If points are equal, the head-to-head records determine the winner. If still equal, the point difference and then points scored become the deciding factors. At the end of each season, the eight clubs with the most points in the Liga Endesa plays the playoffs and the winner of the playoffs is crowned champion. At the lower end, two club are relegated to the LEB Oro, while two teams from the LEB Oro join the Liga Endesa in their stead.

== Organisation ==
=== General Assembly ===
The General Assembly is the deliberative assembly of the ACB. It is composed of the 18 basketball clubs and public limited sports companies (Sociedad Anónima Deportiva, S.A.D.) that make up the Liga Endesa. Each club/S.A.D. is usually represented by its respective president.

=== President ===
The President, along with the other members of the Executive Committee, is responsible for the day-to-day running of the organisation. The current president is Antonio Martín, who was elected to the post on July 16, 2018.

President	Club	Term
Antonio Novoa	CB Granollers	
Mariano Jaquotot	Real Madrid	
Juan Fernández	OAR Ferrol	
Evaristo del Río	N/A	
Eduardo Portela	N/A	1990–2013
Francisco Roca	N/A	2014–2017
Antonio Martín	Real Madrid	2018–present

== See also ==
- Spanish basketball league system
- Spanish Basketball Federation
