= 2026 Supercopa de España de Baloncesto =

21st edition of Spanish basketball supercup

2026 Supercopa Endesa^{1}
Tournament details
- Country: Spain
- City: Badalona
- Venue: Olímpic de Badalona
- Dates: 19–20 September 2026
- Teams: 4
- Defending champions: Valencia Basket

Final positions
- Champions: Asisa Joventut (1st title)
- Runners-up: Barça
- Semifinalists: Valencia Basket; Kosner Baskonia

Tournament statistics
- Matches played: 3
- Attendance: 28,979 (9,660 per match)

Awards
- MVP: Nico Laprovíttola (Asisa Joventut)
- ^{1} Sponsored name, referring to Endesa.

The 2026 Supercopa de España de Baloncesto, also known as Supercopa Endesa for sponsorship reasons, was the 23rd edition of the Supercopa de España de Baloncesto, an annual basketball competition for clubs in the Spanish basketball league system that were successful in its major competitions in the preceding season.

Valencia Basket was the defending champions which were defeated in semifinals by Barça that could not prevent the overwhelming triumph from Asisa Joventut which achieved their first supercup title ending a 18-year drought without titles and becoming the first team to win the supercup as the host team ending a 23-year curse of the host.

All times are in Central European Summer Time (UTC+02:00).

== Qualification ==
The tournament featured the winners from the three major competitions (2025–26 Liga Endesa, 2026 Copa del Rey and 2025 Supercopa Endesa), the host team and the remaining highest ranked team from the 2025–26 Liga Endesa.

=== Qualified teams ===
The following four teams qualified for the tournament.

Team	Method of qualification	Appearance	Last appearance as
Asisa Joventut	Host team	4th	2022 semifinalists
Valencia Basket	Liga Endesa and Supercopa Endesa winners	8th	2025 winners
Kosner Baskonia	Copa del Rey winners	14th	2020 semifinalists
Barça	Liga Endesa runners-up	20th	2024 semifinalists

== Venue ==
On 25 May 2026, ACB selected and announced Badalona as host of the supercup on 19–20 September 2026. The arena was opened in 1991 for the 1992 Summer Olympics and it has been the long–time home arena for one of Spain's historic ACB teams, Joventut. With a capacity of 12,760 spectators, it has previously hosted Olympic basketball games and other international tournaments like the 2026 Basketball Champions League Final Four.

Badalona	2026 Supercopa de España de Baloncesto (Spain)
Olímpic de Badalona	2026 Supercopa de España de Baloncesto (Spain)
Capacity: 12,760	2026 Supercopa de España de Baloncesto (Spain)

== Draw ==
The draw was held on 21 July 2026 in Badalona Museum in Badalona, Spain. Valencia Basket as the league champions and Kosner Baskonia as the cup champions were the seeded teams. The mayor of Badalona, Xavier García Albiol, and the Olympic medalist swimmer Mireia Belmonte acted as the innocent hands of the draw.

== Bracket ==
Semifinals
Asisa Joventut	96
Kosner Baskonia	84
Valencia Basket	86
Barça	87

Final
Asisa Joventut	101
Barça	87

== Semifinals ==
=== Asisa Joventut vs. Kosner Baskonia ===
Asisa Joventut qualified for the final in which they host at the Palau Olímpic led by Argentine point guard Nico Laprovíttola (27 points) after defeating Kosner Baskonia 96–84 in the first semifinal. A strong second half from the team from Badalona, featuring a 58–43 run, proved key to their return to a supercup final after a 39–year absence in their first appearance since 1987.

19 September 2026	Asisa Joventut	96–84	Kosner Baskonia	Badalona
18:00	Scoring by quarter: 20–23, 18–18, 30–16, 28–27
	Pts: Laprovíttola 27; Rebs: Birgander 12; Asts: Laprovíttola 10; PIR: Laprovíttola 28	Boxscore	Pts: Simmons 19; Rebs: Spagnolo 8 Asts: Simmons 6 PIR: Simmons 25	Arena: Olímpic de Badalona; Attendance: 8,702; Referees: Antonio Conde, Martín Caballero, Alberto Sánchez Sixto

=== Valencia Basket vs. Barça ===
Barça vanquished a tough Valencia Basket (86–87) in the second semifinal of the supercup; despite trailing for over 35 minutes, Valencia never gave up and nearly staged a comeback with a buzzer beater from his own half made by Dylan Osetkowski that hit the rim. The team coached by Aleksander Sekulić dominated the boards and held a maximum advantage of 10 points in the second half, fueled by a balanced team effort in which 11 of the 12 players scored, although point guard Justin Robinson (17 points) and power forward Olivier Nkamhoua (10 points and 12 rebounds) stood out.

However, Valencia Basket, led by point guard TJ Shorts (17 points) and small forward Kameron Taylor (23 points), fought hard until the very end and had a chance to turn the match around. Having taken down the defending champions, Barça qualified to the final to face to the host team, Asisa Joventut in the Catalan derby with the aim to win the supercup for the seventh time and the first since 2015. The match at the Olímpic was a rematch of the 2026 ACB Finals, though the contenders bore little resemblance to their previous incarnations; both teams had new coaches and overhauled rosters: 10 new signings for Valencia and 11 for Barça with Valencia opting for continuity while the Barça adopted a radical shift toward a more physical, youthful style of play.

19 September 2026	Valencia Basket	86–87	Barça	Badalona
21:00	Scoring by quarter: 19–24, 21–19, 21–23, 25–21
	Pts: Taylor 23; Rebs: Shorts 6 Asts: Shorts 7 PIR: Shorts 29	Boxscore	Pts: Robinson 17; Rebs: Nkamhoua 12; Asts: Gibson 5 PIR: Nkamhoua 22	Arena: Olímpic de Badalona; Attendance: 8,231; Referees: Carlos Peruga, Óscar Perea, Alfonso Olivares

== Final ==
Argentine point guard Nico Laprovíttola crushed his former team Barça with 31 points and 9 three-pointers, sealing the final for Asisa Joventut (101–87); backed by their home crowd at the Olímpic, the team from Badalona was crowned tournament champion for the first time. Towering over the club that decided not to renew his contract in the summer, Laprovittola broke the competition's record for three-pointers—previously held by his compatriot Pablo Prigioni since 2008 with six. Yet, beyond his individual masterclass, the fact that Dani Miret’s roster was leading the match for the full 40 minutes was due to a collective team effort.

The playmaking of point guard Ricky Rubio (10 points, 8 assists), the perimeter sparks provided by Boogie Ellis (8 points) and Álex Reyes (11 points), and the energy provided by the power forwards Eli Ndiaye (14 points) and Emir Sulejmanović (19 points) in the paint played a significant role in the success of La Penya, which secured its first title since the 2007–08 ULEB Cup. Barça looked uncomfortable and inconsistent throughout the match, though they never stopped fighting; they remained in contention heading into the fourth quarter thanks largely to the leadership of shooting guard Kevin Punter (20 points) and small forward Joel Parra (24 points) which was particularly motivated while facing his former fans.

20 September 2026	Asisa Joventut	101–87	Barça	Badalona
19:00	Scoring by quarter: 32–23, 20–23, 19–22, 30–19
	Pts: Laprovíttola 31; Rebs: Sulejmanović 9 Asts: Rubio 8 PIR: Laprovíttola 28	Boxscore	Pts: Parra 24; Rebs: Martin, Umude 5 Asts: Parra, Robinson 3 PIR: Parra 27	Arena: Olímpic de Badalona; Attendance: 12,046; Referees: Antonio Conde, Carlos Peruga, Arnau Padrós

== Awards ==
=== MVP ===
Pos.	Player	Team
SG	(Spain) Nico Laprovíttola	Asisa Joventut
