= Josean Querejeta =

Spanish basketball player

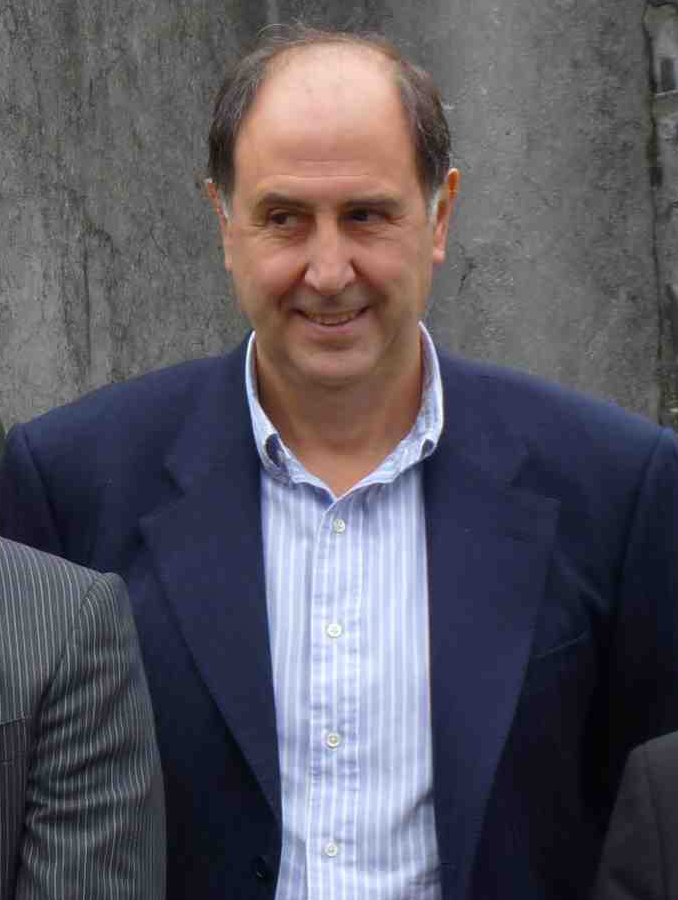
- José Antonio Querejeta in 2010
- Born: José Antonio Querejeta Altuna; 19 March 1957 (age 68); Lazkao, Gipuzkoa, Spain
- Known for: President of Saski Baskonia
- Height: 2.00 m (6 ft 7 in)
- Board member of: Chairman of Avtibask S.L. Chairman of Onalan S.L.
- Basketball career

Career information
- Playing career: 1974–1987
- Position: Small forward
- Number: 14

Career history
- 1974–1978: Baskonia
- 1978–1980: Real Madrid
- 1980–1981: Baskonia
- 1981–1982: Joventut Badalona
- 1982–1983: CAI Zaragoza
- 1983–1984: Corazonistas Vitoria
- 1984–1987: Baskonia

José Antonio Querejeta Altuna (born 19 March 1957), known as Josean Querejeta, is a retired basketball player of Saski Baskonia, Real Madrid, Joventut Badalona and CAI Zaragoza, and the current president of Vitoria-Gasteiz-based Saski Baskonia since 1988, following the conversion of the club into a S.A.D.

From 2013 his Avtibask S.L. group also held a controlling stake in the city's football club Deportivo Alavés.

In October 2025, he was fined after he went outside the referee's locker room to confront them during halftime of the game against Panathinaikos B.C. and he was fined for committing acts representing a lack of respect against the officiating crew.

== Honors ==
With Baskonia (as a player)

- Copa Asociación: (1)
  - 1985

With Baskonia (as a president)

- Spanish Championship: (3)
  - 2001–02, 2007–08, 2009–10
- Spanish Cup: (6)
  - 1995, 1999, 2002, 2004, 2006, 2009
- Spanish Supercup: (4)
  - 2005, 2006, 2007, 2008
- Basque Cup: (2)
  - 2011, 2012
- FIBA Saporta Cup: (1)
  - 1995–96

With Real Madrid

- Spanish Championship: (2)
  - 1979, 1980
- Spanish Cup: (1)
  - 1980
- FIBA European Champions Cup: (1)
  - 1979–80

== Awards ==
- Gianluigi Porelli EuroLeague Executive of the Year: (2)
  - 2005, 2016
