= 2025 Supercopa de España de Baloncesto =

21st edition of Spanish basketball supercup

2025 Supercopa Endesa^{1}

Tournament details
- Country: Spain
- City: Málaga
- Venue: Martín Carpena
- Dates: 27–28 September 2025
- Teams: 4
- Defending champions: Unicaja

Final positions
- Champions: Valencia Basket (2nd title)
- Runners-up: Real Madrid
- Semifinalists: Unicaja; La Laguna Tenerife

Tournament statistics
- Matches played: 3
- Attendance: 28,088 (9,363 per match)

Awards
- MVP: Sergio de Larrea (Valencia Basket)
- ^{1} Sponsored name, referring to Endesa.

The 2025 Supercopa de España de Baloncesto, also known as Supercopa Endesa for sponsorship reasons, was the 22nd edition of the Supercopa de España de Baloncesto, an annual basketball competition for clubs in the Spanish basketball league system that were successful in its major competitions in the preceding season.

Unicaja was the defending champion, which was knocked out in semifinals by Valencia Basket that achieved its second supercup title eight years later than the first one in a close win against Real Madrid.

All times are in Central European Summer Time (UTC+02:00).

== Qualification ==
The tournament featured the winners from the three major competitions (2024–25 Liga Endesa, 2025 Copa del Rey and 2024 Supercopa Endesa), the host team and the remaining highest ranked teams from the 2024–25 Liga Endesa season if vacant berths exist.

=== Qualified teams ===
The following four teams qualified for the tournament.

Team	Method of qualification	Appearance	Last appearance as
Unicaja	Host team, Copa del Rey and Supercopa Endesa winners	8th	2024 winners
Real Madrid	Liga Endesa winners	20th	2024 runners-up
Valencia Basket	Liga Endesa runners-up	7th	2021 semifinalists
La Laguna Tenerife	Liga Endesa third place	3rd	2021 semifinalists

== Venue ==
On 22 January 2025, ACB selected and announced Málaga to host the supercup on 27–28 September 2025. The arena was opened in 1999 and it has been the long–time home arena to one of Spain's top ACB teams, Unicaja. The arena originally had a seating capacity of 9,743 spectators, and an area of around 22,000 square meters. In 2007, a project was proposed to expand the capacity of the venue to 17,000 spectators, due to the high demand for seats and tickets by fans of Unicaja. Ultimately, the expansion project was approved, but to a new capacity of 13,000 spectators, rather than the originally planned 17,000. The expansion project was then scheduled to be completed in separate phases. The first expansion phase, which was completed in 2010, increased the seating capacity from 9,743 to 11,000.

Málaga	2025 Supercopa de España de Baloncesto (Spain)
Martín Carpena	2025 Supercopa de España de Baloncesto (Spain)
Capacity: 10,699	2025 Supercopa de España de Baloncesto (Spain)

== Draw ==
The draw was held on 5 September 2025. Real Madrid as the league champions and Unicaja as the cup champion were the seeded teams.

== Bracket ==
Semifinals
Real Madrid	72
La Laguna Tenerife	71
Unicaja	87
Valencia Basket	93

Final
Real Madrid	94
Valencia Basket	98

== Semifinals ==
=== Unicaja vs. Valencia Basket ===
Valencia Basket defeated defending champion Unicaja 87–93 in a close semifinal where guard Omari Moore was decisive with his debut with Valencia Basket with 20 points and 26 PIR. Therefore, the team from Valencia secured the first ticket to its third supercup final despite the significant absences of Pedro Martínez, who was without his best player, Dominican point guard Jean Montero, as well as key players such as forward Xabi López-Arostegui, point guard Brancou Badio, and one of the signings, former player from Unicaja Yankuba Sima. Unicaja fought hard, dominating the rebound (47–30 overall) but it had poor success from three-point line (7 of 33) and from the free throw line (14 of 24). Ibon Navarro's decision to play without power forward Tyson Pérez, one of the team's most in-form players in the recent Intercontinental Cup and preseason, was surprising.

Before the start of the match, it was pay tribute to the referee Juan Carlos García González in his final match after 28 seasons and 872 matches managed.

27 September 2025	Unicaja	87–93	Valencia Basket	Málaga
18:00	Scoring by quarter: 26–18, 18–25, 27–30, 16–20
	Pts: Kravish 14; Rebs: Sulejmanović 11; Asts: Perry 5 PIR: Duarte 16	Boxscore	Pts: Moore 20; Rebs: Moore 6 Asts: Thompson 6 PIR: Moore 26	Arena: Martín Carpena; Attendance: 9,951; Referees: Juan Carlos García González, Emilio Pérez Pizarro, Rafael Serrano

=== Real Madrid vs. La Laguna Tenerife ===
Real Madrid, in Sergio Scariolo's debut as head coach, managed to beat La Laguna Tenerife (72–71) in the final moments thanks to two free throws from Argentine Gabriel Deck, in a clash that Tenerife let slip away after leading by fourteen points. Therefore, Los Blancos qualified to its eighth consecutive supercup final after salvaging a very lukewarm game against La Laguna Tenerife. The team from Canary Islands came within one final shot from Jaime Fernández of taking the victory, but the guard's three-pointer fell short, and his team was eliminated. Sergio Scariolo qualified to his fourth final as Real Madrid coach, the last in 2001. The recently signed Trey Lyles and the young power forward Izan Almansa were left out to play and the most notable were the aforementioned Deck (12 points and 19 PIR), Edy Tavares (eight points and seven rebounds) and Andrés Feliz at specific moments in the fourth quarter.

27 September 2025	Real Madrid	72–71	La Laguna Tenerife	Málaga
21:00	Scoring by quarter: 18–17, 17–28, 20–15, 17–11
	Pts: Deck, Llull 12; Rebs: Okeke, Tavares 7 Asts: Feliz 4 PIR: Deck 19	Boxscore	Pts: Shermadini 23; Rebs: Abromaitis 5 Asts: Fitipaldo 5 PIR: Shermadini 28	Arena: Martín Carpena; Attendance: 8,507; Referees: Antonio Conde, Óscar Perea, Andrés Fernández

== Final ==
Valencia Basket defeated Real Madrid (94–98) and was crowned supercup champion for the second time in its history after winning the final. Spanish point guard Sergio de Larrea scored 21 points and was named the tournament's MVP. American shooting guard Kameron Taylor also scored 17 points. Pedro Martínez's team beat Scariolo's second title with Real Madrid, which were playing in its eighth consecutive supercup final and seeking their eleventh crown in this tournament. Valencia lifted their second supercup trophy.

28 September 2025	Real Madrid	94–98	Valencia Basket	Málaga
19:00	Scoring by quarter: 27–24, 17–27, 25–18, 25–29
	Pts: Hezonja 19; Rebs: three players 7 Asts: Campazzo 5 PIR: Campazzo 21	Boxscore	Pts: de Larrea 21; Rebs: Costello 7 Asts: Moore 6 PIR: de Larrea 23	Arena: Martín Carpena; Attendance: 9,630; Referees: Emilio Pérez Pizarro, Jordi Aliaga, Rafael Serrano

== Awards ==
=== MVP ===
Pos.	Player	Team
PG	(Spain) Sergio de Larrea	Valencia Basket
