= Ibon Navarro =

Spanish basketball coach (born 1976)

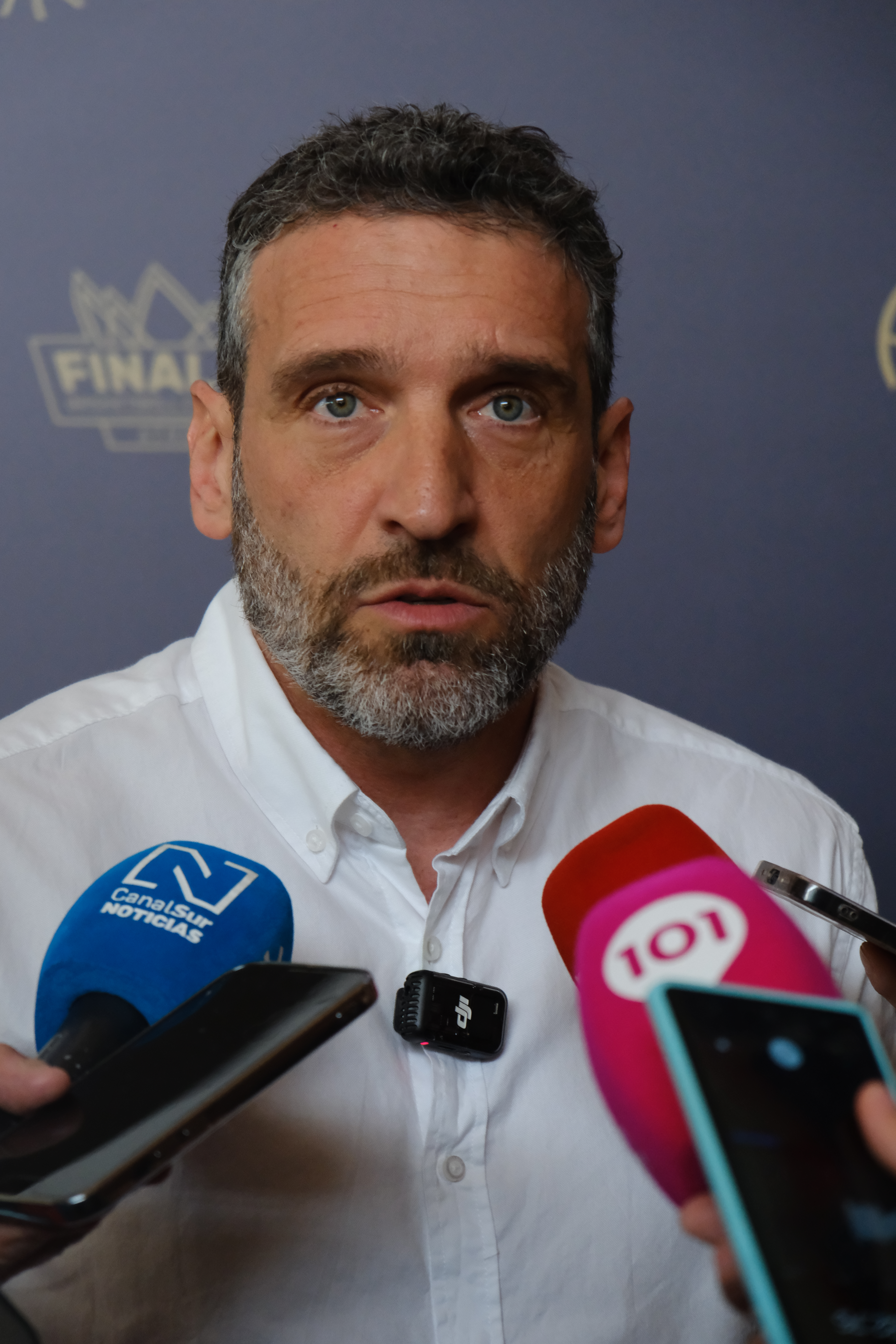
- Navarro in 2025

Crvena zvezda
- Position: Head coach
- League: KLS; ABA League; EuroLeague

Personal information
- Born: April 30, 1976 (age 50) Vitoria-Gasteiz, Spain
- Coaching career: 2000–present

Career history

Coaching
- 2000–2005: Baskonia (youth)
- 2005–2006: UPV Álava
- 2006–2007: Tenerife (assistant)
- 2007–2010: Baskonia (assistant)
- 2010–2011: Menorca (assistant)
- 2011–2012: Valencia (assistant)
- 2013–2014: Baskonia (assistant)
- 2014: Puerto Rico (assistant)
- 2014–2015: Baskonia
- 2015–2017: Manresa
- 2017–2018: Murcia
- 2018–2022: Andorra
- 2022–2026: Unicaja Málaga
- 2026–present: Crvena zvezda

Career highlights
- As head coach: 2× FIBA Intercontinental Cup champion (2024, 2025); 2× FIBA Champions League champion (2024, 2025); 2× Spanish Cup winner (2023, 2025); Spanish Supercup winner (2024); As assistant coach: 2× Liga ACB champion (2008, 2010); Spanish Cup winner (2009); 2× Spanish Supercup winner (2007, 2008)
Medals
Men's basketball
Assistant coach for Puerto Rico
Centrobasket
Silver medal – second place	2014 Mexico

Ibon Navarro Pérez de Albéniz (born 30 April 1976) is a Spanish basketball coach who is currently the head coach for Crvena zvezda of the Basketball League of Serbia (KLS), the ABA League and the EuroLeague.

== Coaching career ==
Ibon Navarro has been a coach in the lower categories of Saski Baskonia from 2000 to 2005. His first experience in professional basketball was as assistant coach of Rafa Sanz at Tenerife Rural. One year later, Navarro debuted in Spanish League during the 2007–08 season as the assistant coach of Neven Spahija and stayed there until 2010. After leaving Vitoria-Gasteiz he was the assistant coach of Paco Olmos in his experiences at Menorca, where the team finished in the last position, Valencia Basket, where Olmos was sacked during the season, and the Puerto Rico national team, achieving the silver medal at the 2014 Centrobasket.

Ibon Navarro helped Baskonia win two Spanish Leagues, one Spanish King's Cup and two Spanish Supercups. With Valencia he was the runner-up in the Spanish King's Cup and in EuroCup.

In 2013, he came back to Laboral Kutxa as assistant of Sergio Scariolo. In November 2014, after the dismissal of Scariolo and Marco Crespi, Navarro assumed the role of head coach. In February 2015, the club published a documentary about him.

In June 2015, the club announced he would not continue as head coach of the first team, although his continued participation in the club was encouraged. He waved off the fans thanking all the confidence and support received during his stay in the club.

In July 2015, Navarro signed a three-year deal with ICL Manresa. In June 2017, Navarro part ways with ICL Manresa after the relegation to LEB Oro and signed a one-year deal with UCAM Murcia. With Murcia, Navarro reached the Champions League Final Four in the club's first participation losing to AEK Athens in the semifinals and winning the third place game over MHP Riesen Ludwigsburg.

In June 2018, Navarro ended contract with UCAM Murcia and signed a two-year deal with MoraBanc Andorra.

On 10 February 2022, Navarro signed with Unicaja of the Liga ACB. Under his leadership, the team secured back-to-back Basketball Champions League titles in 2024 and 2025. With these victories, Unicaja became the second Spanish club to win consecutive titles in the competition's history, following San Pablo Burgos in 2020 and 2021. Navarro also led Unicaja to two Spanish Cup titles in 2023 and 2025, as well as their first Spanish Supercup title in 2024.

In June 2026, he became the coach of KK Crvena zvezda.

== Coaching record ==
Legend
G	Games coached	W	Games won	L	Games lost	W–L %	Win-loss %

Note: The EuroLeague is not the only competition in which the team played during the season. He also coached in domestic competition, and regional competition if applicable.

=== EuroLeague ===
Team	Year	G	W	L	W–L%	Result
Baskonia	2014–15	19	9	10	.474	Eliminated in Top 16 stage
Career		19	9	10	.474	

== Trophies ==
- 2007–08 TAU Cerámica. Spanish League champion.
- 2007–08 TAU Cerámica. Spanish King's Cup runner-up.
- 2007–08 TAU Cerámica. Spanish Supercup champion.
- 2008–09 TAU Cerámica. Spanish League runner-up.
- 2008–09 TAU Cerámica. Spanish King's Cup champion.
- 2008–09 TAU Cerámica. Spanish Supercup champion.
- 2009–10 Caja Laboral. Spanish League champion.
- 2011–12 Valencia Basket. EuroCup runner-up.
- 2012–13 Valencia Basket. Spanish King's Cup runner-up.
- 2014 Puerto Rico. Centrobasket silver medal..
- 2022–23 Baloncesto Málaga Spanish King's Cup champion.
- 2023–24 Baloncesto Málaga FIBA Champions League champion.
- 2024–25 Baloncesto Málaga Spanish Supercup champion.
- 2024–25 Baloncesto Málaga Spanish King's Cup champion.
- 2024–25 Baloncesto Málaga FIBA Champions League champion.

== Others ==
- 2014 Puerto Rico Centrobasket.
- Graduated in chemical sciences.
