= 2023 Supercopa de España de Baloncesto =

2023 Supercopa Endesa^{1}

Tournament details
- Country: Spain
- City: Murcia
- Venue(s): Palacio de Deportes
- Dates: 16–17 September 2023
- Teams: 4
- Defending champions: Real Madrid

Final positions
- Champions: Real Madrid (10th title)
- Runner-up: Unicaja
- Semifinalists: Barça; UCAM Murcia

Tournament statistics
- Matches played: 3
- Attendance: 22,200 (7,400 per match)

Awards
- MVP: Facundo Campazzo (Real Madrid)
- ^{1} Sponsored name, referring to Endesa.

The 2023 Supercopa de España de Baloncesto, also known as Supercopa Endesa for sponsorship reasons, was the 20th edition of the Supercopa de España de Baloncesto, an annual basketball competition for clubs in the Spanish basketball league system that were successful in its major competitions in the preceding season.

Real Madrid were the defending champions and defended the title successfully for their 6th Supercopa in a row and 10th in total.

All times are in Central European Summer Time (UTC+02:00).

== Qualification ==
The tournament will feature the winners from the three major competitions (2022–23 Liga Endesa, 2023 Copa del Rey and 2022 Supercopa Endesa), the host team and the remaining highest ranked teams from the 2022–23 Liga Endesa season if vacant berths exist.

=== Qualified teams ===
The following four teams qualified for the tournament.

Team	Method of qualification	Appearance	Last appearance as
Barça	2022–23 Liga Endesa winners	18th	2022 runners-up
Unicaja	2023 Copa del Rey champions	6th	2017 semifinalists
Real Madrid	2022 Supercopa Endesa winners	18th	2022 winners
UCAM Murcia	Host team	1st	Debut

== Venue ==
On July 20, 2023, ACB selected and announced Murcia to host the supercup in September 2023. The arena holds 7,454 people and was built in 1994. It had a budget of 25 million dollars, and was the most modern arena in Europe the moment it was built. The arena hosted the 1996 Copa del Rey de Baloncesto and 1998 All-Star weekend.

Murcia	2023 Supercopa de España de Baloncesto (Spain)
Palacio de Deportes	2023 Supercopa de España de Baloncesto (Spain)
Capacity: 7,454	2023 Supercopa de España de Baloncesto (Spain)

== Draw ==
The draw was held on 22 August 2023. Barça as the league champion and Unicaja as the cup champion were the seeded teams.

== Bracket ==
Semifinals
UCAM Murcia	74
Unicaja	79
Barça	80
Real Madrid	90

Final
Unicaja	81
Real Madrid	88

== Semifinals ==
=== Barça vs. Real Madrid ===
16 September 2023	Barça	80–90	Real Madrid	Murcia
18:30	Scoring by quarter: 25–22, 15–20, 19–25, 21–23
	Pts: Laprovíttola 27; Rebs: Abrines 4 Asts: Laprovíttola 5 PIR: Laprovíttola 32	Boxscore	Pts: Musa 24; Rebs: Tavares 11; Asts: Campazzo 5 PIR: Tavares 28	Arena: Palacio de Deportes; Attendance: 7,400; Referees: Benjamín Jiménez, Rafael Serrano, Cristóbal Sánchez

=== UCAM Murcia vs. Unicaja ===
16 September 2023	UCAM Murcia	74–79	Unicaja	Murcia
21:30	Scoring by quarter: 20–20, 17–21, 19–19, 18–19
	Pts: Ennis 14; Rebs: Radović 8 Asts: Håkanson 5 PIR: Diagne 19	Boxscore	Pts: Đedović 13; Rebs: Ejim 7 Asts: Perry 4 PIR: Ejim 18	Arena: Palacio de Deportes; Attendance: 7,400; Referees: Antonio Conde, Vicente Bultó, Alfonso Olivares

== Final ==
17 September 2023	Unicaja	81–88	Real Madrid	Murcia
19:00	Scoring by quarter: 17–21, 14–23, 25–17, 25–27
	Pts: Perry 17; Rebs: Kalinoski 6 Asts: Perry 4 PIR: Perry 16	Boxscore	Pts: Campazzo 19; Rebs: Tavares 11; Asts: Campazzo 5 PIR: Campazzo 23	Arena: Palacio de Deportes; Attendance: 7,400; Referees: Antonio Conde, Rafael Serrano, Javier Torres

2023 Supercopa Endesa champions
Real Madrid
10th title
