= Álex Reyes (basketball) =

Spanish basketball player (born 1993)

- Reyes with Joventut in 2026

No. 18 – Joventut Badalona
- Position: Small forward
- League: Liga ACB

Personal information
- Born: December 17, 1993 (age 32) Cáceres, Spain
- Listed height: 2.02 m (6 ft 8 in)
- Listed weight: 85 kg (187 lb)

Career information
- Playing career: 2010–present

Career history
- 2010–2011: Valladolid
- 2011–2014: Estudiantes Lugo
- 2014–2017: Clavijo
- 2017: Lucentum Alicante
- 2017–2019: Ciudad de Valladolid
- 2019–2020: Oviedo
- 2020–2024: Bilbao
- 2024–2026: Manresa
- 2026–present: Joventut

Career highlights
- Spanish Supercup winner (2026)

Alejandro Reyes Abad (born December 17, 1993) is a Spanish professional basketball player for Joventut of the Liga ACB. Standing at 6 ft 8 in (2.02 m), Reyes plays as a small forward. He has also represented the Spanish national team internationally.

== Early life and youth career ==
Born in Cáceres, Extremadura, Reyes is the son of a Spanish former professional basketball player, Miguel Ángel Reyes. Growing up in Palencia, he started playing basketball in the youth ranks of CB Palencia and later CB Valladolid. He would eventually make his professional debut in Liga ACB with Valladolid's senior team in 2011.

== Professional career ==
After making two appearances for Valladolid in the 2010–11 ACB season, Reyes signed for Estudiantes Lugo, a Liga EBA team associated to CB Breogán. During three seasons with Estudiantes, Reyes would train with and occasionally play for Breogán in LEB Oro.

On August 26, 2014, Reyes signed for the reserve team of CB Clavijo, then playing in Liga EBA. Making several appearances for Clavijo's senior team in LEB Oro during his first season, Reyes would officially join the senior team in his second season.

On January 2, 2017, Reyes signed for Lucentum Alicante of the Spanish LEB Plata. On July 17, 2017, Reyes signed for CBC Valladolid of the LEB Oro, the successor team of the now defunct CB Valladolid. After two seasons with Valladolid, Reyes joined another LEB Oro team, Oviedo CB, on June 14, 2019.

In July 2020, Reyes signed for Bilbao Basket of the Liga ACB, making his return to the top-tier of Spanish basketball nearly 10 years after his debut. He signed a two-season deal with the Basque team. On June 3, 2022, Reyes signed a contract extension for two more seasons with Bilbao. In March 2024, Reyes recorded his best performance with Bilbao, scoring 8 three-pointers and tying the club's record in Liga ACB. His performance also earned him the selection as player of the round.

On July 3, 2024, he joined Bàsquet Manresa of the Liga ACB and the EuroCup, signing a two-season contract. Becoming a key player in Manresa's roster, he signed a contract extension for two more seasons in February 2026. On June 22, 2026, Manresa announced Reyes had activated his contract's release clause and the player was therefore leaving the club after two seasons.

On July 6, 2026, he signed with Joventut of the Liga ACB.

== National team career ==
Reyes made his debut for the Spanish national team in February 2023, facing Italy in a 2023 World Cup qualification game. He would again represent Spain in November 2025 and February 2026 for World Cup qualification games.

== Career statistics ==
Legend
GP	Games played	GS	Games started	MPG	Minutes per game
FG%	Field-goal percentage	3P%	3-point field-goal percentage	FT%	Free-throw percentage
RPG	Rebounds per game	APG	Assists per game	SPG	Steals per game
BPG	Blocks per game	PPG	Points per game	PIR	Performance index rating
**Bold**	Career high

=== Domestic leagues ===
==== Regular season ====
Year	Team	League	GP	MPG	FG%	3P%	FT%	RPG	APG	SPG	BPG	PPG
2020–21	(Spain) Bilbao	ACB	35	11.7	.421	.357	.846	1.7	.4	.5	.0	3.8
2021–22	(Spain) Bilbao	ACB	31	14.8	.408	.404	.727	2.2	.4	.4	.0	5.2
2022–23	(Spain) Bilbao	ACB	34	19.7	.401	.364	.782	3.1	.6	.7	.0	7.4
2023–24	(Spain) Bilbao	ACB	33	14.6	.399	.339	.730	2.3	.3	.5	.0	5.9
2024–25	(Spain) Manresa	ACB	28	18.8	.364	.347	.840	3.5	.6	.7	.0	7.6

== Personal life ==
In addition to his father Miguel Ángel's professional basketball career, Reyes' brothers Álvaro and Alonso are also basketball players.
