= 2017 Supercopa de España de Baloncesto =

2017 Supercopa Endesa
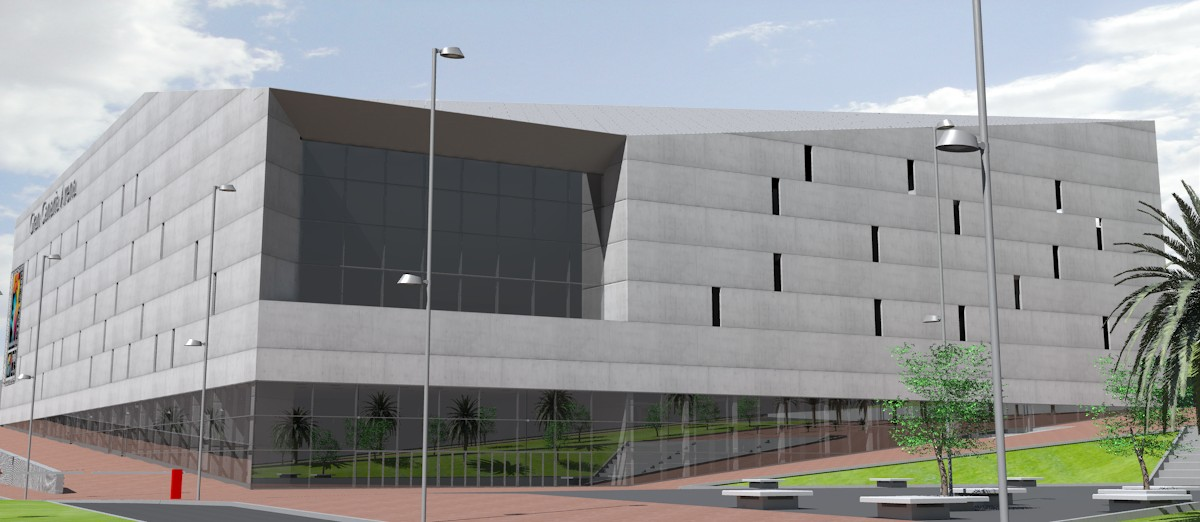
- The Gran Canaria Arena will host the Supercopa

Tournament details
- Arena: Gran Canaria Arena; Las Palmas, Spain
- Dates: 22–23 September 2017

Final positions
- Champions: Valencia Basket (1st title)
- Runners-up: Herbalife Gran Canaria

Awards and statistics
- MVP: Erick Green

The 2017 Supercopa de España de Baloncesto was the 14th edition of the tournament since it is organized by the ACB and the 18th overall. It will be also called Supercopa Endesa for sponsorship reasons. It was played in the Gran Canaria Arena in Las Palmas on September. Herbalife Gran Canaria was the defending champion.

== Participant teams and draw ==
On 13 February 2017 the ACB confirmed Las Palmas to host the tournament. The semifinals were drawn on 6 July 2017, without any restriction.

Team	Qualified as	Appearance
Herbalife Gran Canaria	Host team	4th
Real Madrid	Copa del Rey champion	15th
Unicaja	EuroCup champion	5th
Valencia Basket	ACB League champion	4th

== Semifinals ==
=== Valencia Basket vs. Unicaja ===
22 September 2017	Valencia Basket	83–78	Unicaja	Las Palmas
18:30 (WEST)	Scoring by quarter: 31–18, 19–18, 16–27, 17–15
	Pts: Green 18; Rebs: Thomas 9 Asts: Diot 6 PIR: Thomas 16	Boxscore	Pts: Nedović 23; Rebs: Shermadini 5 Asts: Augustine 4 PIR: Brooks 16	Arena: Gran Canaria Arena; Attendance: 8,975; Referees: Pérez Pizarro, Peruga, Araña

=== Herbalife Gran Canaria vs. Real Madrid ===
22 September 2017	Herbalife Gran Canaria	73–64	Real Madrid	Las Palmas
21:00 (WEST)	Scoring by quarter: 24–17, 13–11, 14–11, 22–25
	Pts: Mekel, Pasečņiks 11; Rebs: McKissic 7 Asts: Oliver 6 PIR: Báez 19	Boxscore	Pts: Ayón 17; Rebs: three players 5 Asts: Campazzo 3 PIR: Ayón 21	Arena: Gran Canaria Arena; Attendance: 9,386; Referees: Pérez Pérez, Cortés, Aliaga

== Final ==
23 September 2017	Herbalife Gran Canaria	63–69	Valencia Basket	Las Palmas
18:30 (WEST)	Scoring by quarter: 13–13, 19–10, 14–25, 17–21
	Pts: Eriksson 13; Rebs: Rabaseda 5 Asts: Oliver 8 PIR: Eriksson 18	Boxscore	Pts: San Emeterio 18; Rebs: Dubljević, Thomas 7 Asts: Vives 2 PIR: Dubljević 25	Arena: Gran Canaria Arena; Attendance: 9,478; Referees: Pérez Pizarro, Peruga, Cortés
