= 2016 Supercopa de España de Baloncesto =

2016 Supercopa Endesa
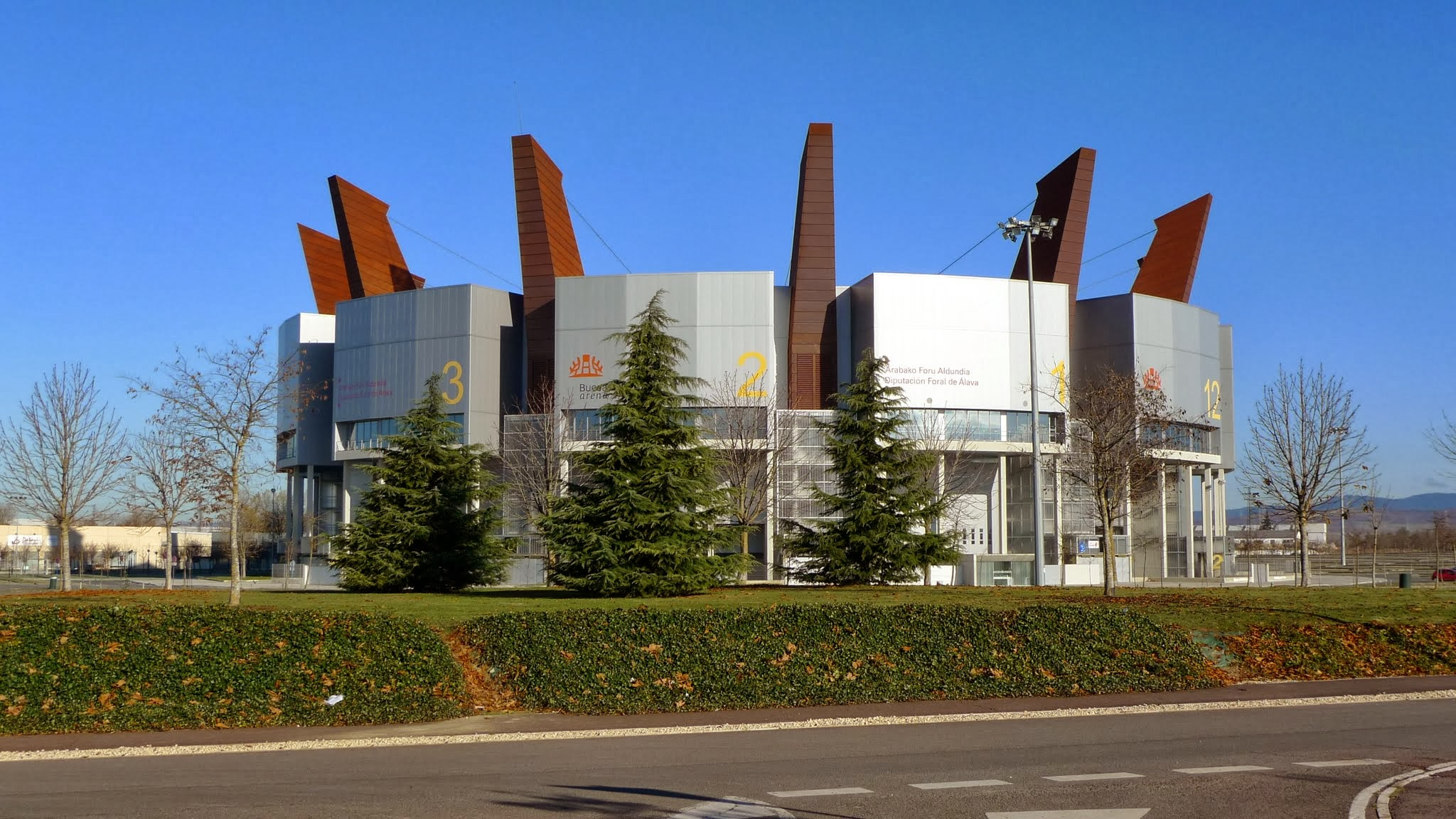
- The Fernando Buesa Arena hosted the Supercopa

Tournament details
- Arena: Fernando Buesa Arena; Vitoria-Gasteiz, Spain
- Dates: 23 September 2014– 24 September 2014

Final positions
- Champions: Herbalife Gran Canaria (1st title)
- Runners-up: FC Barcelona Lassa

Awards and statistics
- MVP: (United States) Kyle Kuric

The Supercopa de España de Baloncesto 2016 was the 13th edition of the tournament since it is organized by the ACB and the 17th overall. It was also called Supercopa Endesa for sponsorship reasons. It was played in the Fernando Buesa Arena in Vitoria-Gasteiz on September 23 and 24.

Herbalife Gran Canaria won its first national title after beating Baskonia in the semifinal and FC Barcelona Lassa in the final.

== Participant teams and draw ==
On August 1, 2016, the ACB confirmed Vitoria-Gasteiz to host the tournament and the participants. The draw of the semifinals will take part on 5 September 2016. As there will be only one seeded team (Real Madrid as League and Cup champion), there will not exist any restrictions for the pairings.

Team	Qualified as	Appearance
Baskonia	Host team	11th
Real Madrid	2015–16 ACB and 2016 Copa del Rey champion	14th
Herbalife Gran Canaria	2016 Copa del Rey runner-up	3rd
FC Barcelona Lassa	2015–16 ACB runner-up	13th

== Semifinals ==
=== Baskonia vs. Herbalife Gran Canaria ===
23 September 2016	Baskonia	80–84	Herbalife Gran Canaria	Vitoria-Gasteiz
19:00 (CEST)	Scoring by quarter: 13–17, 12–15, 28–21, 27–30
	Pts: Shengelia 16; Rebs: Tillie 6 Asts: Luz 7 PIR: Hanga 16	Boxscore	Pts: Kuric 24; Rebs: Planinić 8 Asts: Oliver 5 PIR: Kuric 22	Arena: Fernando Buesa Arena; Attendance: 9,257; Referees: José Antonio Martín Bertrán, Antonio Conde, Luis Miguel Castillo

Starters:			Pts	Reb	Ast
PG	55	(Brazil) Rafael Luz	5	1	7
SG	5	(United States) Trevor Cooney	15	2	0
SF	8	(Hungary) Ádám Hanga	15	3	3
PF	14	(France) Kim Tillie	2	6	0
C	12	(Spain) Ilimane Diop	6	2	1
Reserves:					
PG	0	(United States) Shane Larkin	12	0	2
PF	7	(Germany) Johannes Voigtmann	6	5	1
SG	9	(Lithuania) Tadas Sedekerskis	0	2	0
SF	11	(Slovenia) Jaka Blažič	3	5	1
PG	17	(Latvia) Artūrs Kurucs	DNP		
SF	20	(Slovenia) Jurij Macura	DNP		
PF	23	(Georgia (country)) Tornike Shengelia	16	3	14
Head coach:
(Spain) Sito Alonso

Baskonia	Herbalife Gran Canaria

Starters:			Pts	Reb	Ast
PG	7	(North Macedonia) Bo McCalebb	10	3	2
SG	9	(Finland) Sasu Salin	12	1	2
PF	22	(Spain) Xavi Rabaseda	0	3	2
PF	23	(Dominican Republic) Eulis Báez	8	6	2
C	2	(United States) Richard Hendrix	7	1	0
Reserves:					
PG	4	(Spain) Albert Oliver	9	5	5
C	6	(Croatia) Darko Planinić	9	8	1
PF	14	(Latvia) Anžejs Pasečņiks	2	0	0
SF	15	(United States) Royce O'Neale	0	4	3
SF	21	(Spain) Oriol Paulí	2	1	1
SG	24	(United States) Kyle Kuric	24	3	0
PF	34	(Spain) Pablo Aguilar	DNP		
Head coach:
(Spain) Luis Casimiro

=== Real Madrid vs. FC Barcelona Lassa ===
23 September 2016	Real Madrid	93–99	FC Barcelona Lassa	Vitoria-Gasteiz
21:30 (CEST)	Scoring by quarter: 26–26, 22–21, 22–26, 23–26
	Pts: Llull 27; Rebs: Dončić 8 Asts: Fernández 5 PIR: Llull 22	Boxscore	Pts: Rice 30; Rebs: Tomić 8 Asts: Rice 6 PIR: Rice 34	Arena: Fernando Buesa Arena; Attendance: 9,257; Referees: Juan Carlos García González, Benjamín Jiménez, Carlos Peruga

Starters:			Pts	Reb	Ast
PG	23	(Spain) Sergio Llull	27	1	2
SG	5	(Spain) Rudy Fernández	15	2	5
SF	44	(Sweden) Jeffery Taylor	0	1	0
PF	3	(United States) Anthony Randolph	7	5	2
C	14	(Mexico) Gustavo Ayón	4	2	0
Reserves:					
PG	4	(Croatia) Dontaye Draper	9	1	3
SF	6	(Argentina) Andrés Nocioni	0	1	0
PG	7	(Slovenia) Luka Dončić	8	8	1
SG	8	(Lithuania) Jonas Mačiulis	DNP		
PF	9	(Spain) Felipe Reyes	6	4	1
SF	20	(Azerbaijan) Jaycee Carroll	10	5	1
C	21	(United States) Othello Hunter	7	7	2
Head coach:
(Spain) Pablo Laso

Real Madrid	FC Barcelona Lassa

Starters:			Pts	Reb	Ast
PG	2	(Montenegro) Tyrese Rice	30	3	6
SG	24	(United States) Brad Oleson	6	1	3
SF	33	(Greece) Stratos Perperoglou	6	6	2
PF	10	(Spain) Víctor Claver	16	7	1
C	44	(Croatia) Ante Tomić	14	8	1
Reserves:					
PF	5	(Kosovo) Justin Doellman	11	3	0
C	6	(United States) Joey Dorsey	6	3	0
SG	8	(Spain) Pau Ribas	4	3	3
SG	11	(Spain) Juan Carlos Navarro	6	1	4
PF	14	(Bulgaria) Sasha Vezenkov	0	0	0
PG	16	(Serbia) Stefan Peno	DNP		
SF	20	(Sweden) Markus Eriksson	DNP		
Head coach:
(Greece) Georgios Bartzokas

== Final ==
24 September 2016	Herbalife Gran Canaria	79–59	FC Barcelona Lassa	Vitoria-Gasteiz
19:00 (CEST)	Scoring by quarter: 23–17, 27–22, 12–9, 17–11
	Pts: McCalebb 15; Rebs: O'Neale 8 Asts: O'Neale, Oliver 4 PIR: Báez, McCalebb 18	Boxscore	Pts: Claver, Navarro 12; Rebs: Dorsey 8 Asts: Navarro 4 PIR: Claver 18	Arena: Fernando Buesa Arena; Attendance: 9,350; Referees: José Manuel Martín Bertrán, Antonio Conde, Sergio Manuel

Starters:			Pts	Reb	Ast
PG	7	(North Macedonia) Bo McCalebb	15	5	5
SG	9	(Finland) Sasu Salin	10	1	0
SF	15	(United States) Royce O'Neale	8	8	4
PF	23	(Dominican Republic) Eulis Báez	11	6	3
C	2	(United States) Richard Hendrix	8	5	1
Reserves:					
PG	4	(Spain) Albert Oliver	1	2	4
C	6	(Croatia) Darko Planinić	12	4	1
PF	14	(Latvia) Anžejs Pasečņiks	2	2	0
SF	21	(Spain) Oriol Paulí	0	1	0
PF	22	(Spain) Xavi Rabaseda	0	1	2
SG	24	(United States) Kyle Kuric	10	0	0
PF	34	(Spain) Pablo Aguilar	2	1	0
Head coach:
(Spain) Luis Casimiro

Herbalife Gran Canaria	FC Barcelona Lassa

Supercopa Endesa MVP
(United States) Kyle Kuric
Game rules
Game was played under FIBA rules.

2016 Supercopa Endesa champions
Herbalife Gran Canaria
1st title

Starters:			Pts	Reb	Ast
PG	2	(Montenegro) Tyrese Rice	6	1	2
SG	24	(United States) Brad Oleson	8	2	1
SF	33	(Greece) Stratos Perperoglou	0	0	1
PF	10	(Spain) Víctor Claver	12	7	0
C	44	(Croatia) Ante Tomić	6	6	2
Reserves:					
PF	5	(Kosovo) Justin Doellman	9	3	3
C	6	(United States) Joey Dorsey	4	8	1
SG	8	(Spain) Pau Ribas	2	1	3
SG	11	(Spain) Juan Carlos Navarro	12	1	4
PF	14	(Bulgaria) Sasha Vezenkov	DNP		
PG	16	(Serbia) Stefan Peno	0	0	0
SF	20	(Sweden) Markus Eriksson	0	1	0
Head coach:
(Greece) Georgios Bartzokas
