= Sergio de Larrea =

Spanish basketball player (born 2005)

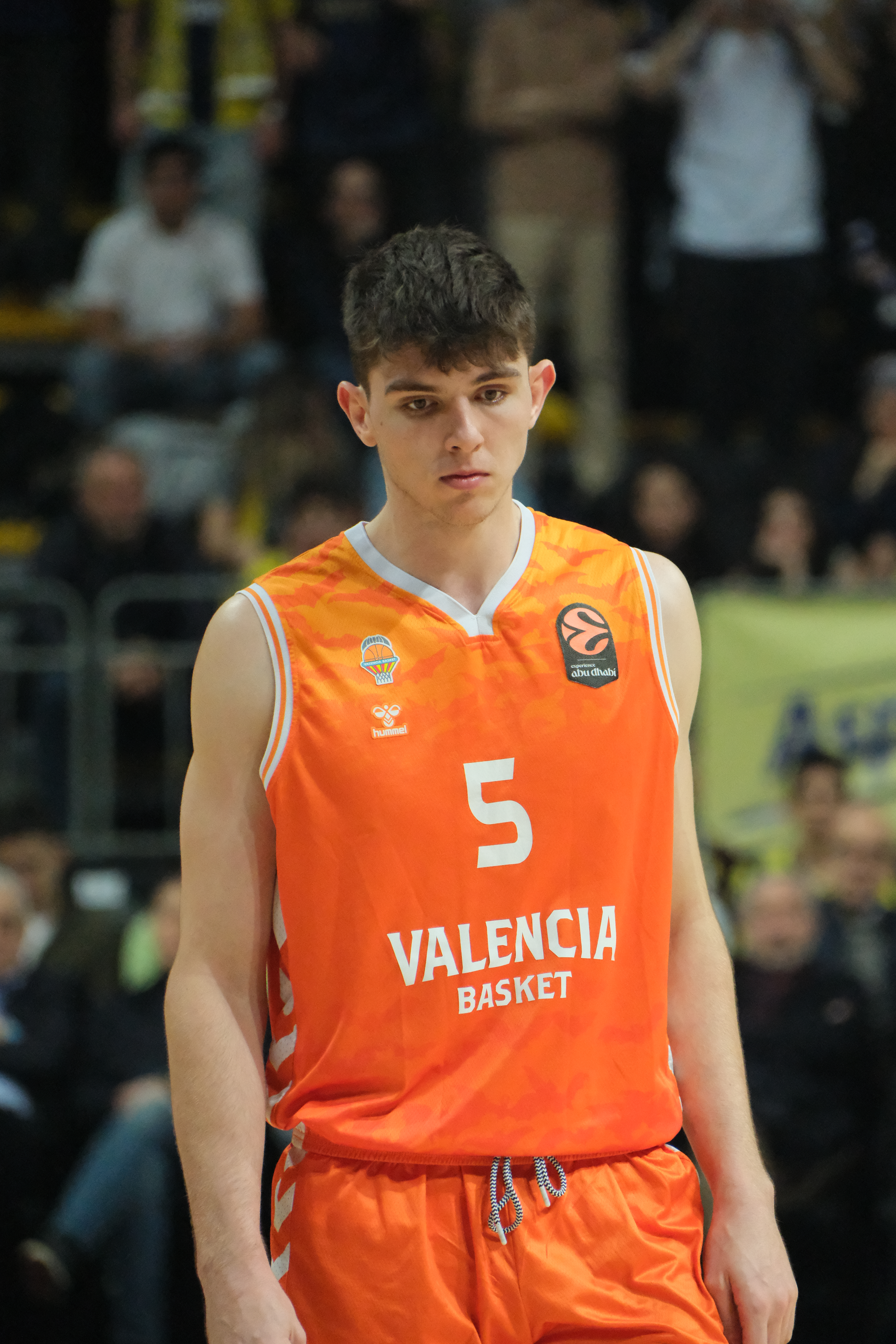
- De Larrea with Valencia Basket in 2026

No. 55 – Dallas Mavericks
- Position: Point guard / shooting guard
- League: NBA

Personal information
- Born: 4 December 2005 (age 20) Valladolid, Spain
- Listed height: 6 ft 6 in (1.98 m)
- Listed weight: 175 lb (79 kg)

Career information
- NBA draft: 2026: 1st round, 25th overall pick
- Drafted by: Los Angeles Lakers
- Playing career: 2021–present

Career history
- 2021–2022: Valencia B
- 2022–2026: Valencia
- 2022–2024: →L'Horta Godella
- 2026–present: Dallas Mavericks

Career highlights
- Liga ACB champion (2026); Spanish Supercup winner (2025); Liga ACB Best Young Player (2026); 2× All-Liga ACB Young Players Team (2025, 2026); Spanish Supercup MVP (2025)
- Stats at NBA.com
- Stats at Basketball Reference
Medals
Men's basketball
Representing Spain
FIBA U19 World Cup
Gold medal – first place	2023 Hungary	Team
FIBA U17 World Cup
Silver medal – second place	2022 Spain	Team

Sergio de Larrea Asenjo (born 4 December 2005) is a Spanish basketball player for the Dallas Mavericks of the National Basketball Association (NBA). He previously played for Valencia Basket. In international competitions he represents the Spanish national team.

== Early life ==
De Larrea was born on 4 December 2005 in Valladolid, Spain. His parents both played basketball on the University of Valladolid teams. He grew up playing basketball and attended Colegio San Agustín. After playing for a time with the team at his school, he move to Valencia to join the club Valencia Basket, training with their youth team.

== Professional career ==
=== Valencia (2021–2026) ===
De Larrea averaged 8.0 points for the Valencia U18 team in the 2020–21 season, then averaged 18.0 points for the Valencia reserve team in the Segunda LEB (third-tier) in 2021–22. He played most of the 2022–23 season with CB L'Horta Godella in the LEB league, averaging 10.1 points. He was promoted and made his senior debut for Valencia in January 2023, in EuroLeague play, at the age of 17. He returned to L'Horta Godella in 2023–24 and averaged 13.7 points, while also appearing in two games for Valencia. After declining offers to play college basketball in the U.S., he returned to Valencia for the 2024–25 season. He played regularly for the team at point guard. Finishing the 2024-25 season, De Larrea played sparingly and averaged 3.6 points, 2.2 assists, and 2.2 rebounds.

Entering the 2025-26 season, De Larrea became a key player for Valencia and was playing a career-high number of minutes. During the 2025-26 season, De Larrea averaged 9.7 points, 3.7 assists, and 3 rebounds, making it a career high for De Larrea across his stats sheets. De Larrea also made it to the Spanish League championship, where Valencia defeated FC Barcelona 3-1. During the series, he posted averages of 9.7 points, 3.7 assists, and 3.0 rebounds in just over 18 minutes per game.

=== Dallas Mavericks (2026–present) ===
On April 24, 2026, De Larrea declared for the 2026 NBA Draft. On June 23, 2026, De Larrea was selected with the 25th overall pick by the Los Angeles Lakers, but his rights were subsequently traded to the New York Knicks, alongside the draft rights to Chinemelu Elonu and Louis Labeyrie, for the draft rights to the 24th pick, Cameron Carr. Following the trade, De Larrea's draft rights were traded again, this time to the Dallas Mavericks in a three-team trade which saw Koa Peat go to the Phoenix Suns, while the Knicks got Tyler Nickel, three second-round picks and cash considerations. After facing concerns of being drafted and stashed in the EuroLeague, general manager Masai Ujiri and Mike Schmitz confirmed that De Larrea would be appearing on the 2026–27 Dallas Mavericks season. On July 3, 2026, De Larrea signed a standard contract with the Mavericks and he will be participating with the team during the 2026 NBA Summer League. In his 2026 NBA Summer League series with the Mavericks, De Larrea averaged 8 points, 4.8 rebounds, and 8.8 assists throughout four games.

== International career ==
De Larrea helped Spain win a silver medal at the 2022 FIBA Under-17 Basketball World Cup. The following year, he helped Spain win the 2023 FIBA Under-19 Basketball World Cup, and in 2024, he competed at the European U20 championship. He was called up to the senior national team and trained with them prior to the 2024 Summer Olympics. He made his senior national debut against the Dominican Republic in June 2024.
