= 2022 Supercopa de España de Baloncesto =

2022 Supercopa Endesa^{1}

Tournament details
- Country: Spain
- City: Seville
- Venue(s): San Pablo
- Dates: 24–25 September 2022
- Teams: 4
- Defending champions: Real Madrid

Final positions
- Champions: Real Madrid (9th title)
- Runner-up: Barça
- Semifinalists: Coosur Real Betis; Joventut

Tournament statistics
- Matches played: 3
- Attendance: 17,347 (5,782 per match)

Awards
- MVP: Edy Tavares (Real Madrid)
- ^{1} Sponsored name, referring to Endesa.

The 2022 Supercopa de España de Baloncesto, also known as Supercopa Endesa for sponsorship reasons, was the 19th edition of the Supercopa de España de Baloncesto, an annual basketball competition for clubs in the Spanish basketball league system that were successful in its major competitions in the preceding season.

Real Madrid were the defending champions and defended the title successfully for their 5th Supercopa in a row and 9th in total.

All times are in Central European Summer Time (UTC+02:00).

== Qualification ==
The tournament will feature the winners from the three major competitions (2021–22 Liga Endesa, 2022 Copa del Rey and 2021 Supercopa Endesa), the host team and the remaining highest ranked teams from the 2021–22 Liga Endesa season if vacant berths exist.

=== Qualified teams ===
The following four teams qualified for the tournament.

Team	Method of qualification	Appearance	Last appearance as
Real Madrid	2021–22 Liga Endesa and 2021 Supercopa Endesa champions	17th	2021 winners
Barça	2022 Copa del Rey champions	17th	2021 runners-up
Joventut	2021–22 Liga Endesa third place	3rd	2008 semifinalists
Coosur Real Betis	Host team	1st	Debut

== Venue ==
On July 18, 2022, ACB selected and announced Seville to host the supercup in September 2022. The venue can hold up to 7,242 people for basketball games. It is part of a sports complex which also contains a gym, two swimming pools, chess playing hall, fitness rooms, aerobics, rehab and changing rooms. The arena hosted the 2014 FIBA Basketball World Cup along with five other Spanish cities, as well as 1994 Copa del Rey de Baloncesto, EuroBasket 2007 and 2008 Copa de la Reina de Baloncesto.

Seville	2022 Supercopa de España de Baloncesto (Spain)
San Pablo	2022 Supercopa de España de Baloncesto (Spain)
Capacity: 7,242	2022 Supercopa de España de Baloncesto (Spain)

== Draw ==
The draw was held on 29 August 2022. Real Madrid as the league champion and Barça as the cup champion were the seeded teams.

== Bracket ==
Semifinals
24 September
Coosur Real Betis	69
Real Madrid	100
24 September
Barça	91
Joventut	74

Final
25 September
Real Madrid (OT)	89
Barça	83

== Semifinals ==
=== Coosur Real Betis vs. Real Madrid ===
24 September 2022	Coosur Real Betis	69–100	Real Madrid	Seville
18:30	Scoring by quarter: 21–25, 14–17, 13–26, 21–32
	Pts: Johnson 14; Rebs: Gerun, Johnson 6 Asts: five players 2 PIR: Johnson 16	Boxscore	Pts: Musa 21; Rebs: Yabusele 9 Asts: Musa 7 PIR: Musa 33	Arena: San Pablo; Attendance: 5,695; Referees: Carlos Peruga, Fernando Calatrava, Alberto Sánchez Sixto

=== Barça vs. Joventut ===
24 September 2022	Barça	91–74	Joventut	Seville
21:30	Scoring by quarter: 18–22, 21–24, 29–14, 23–14
	Pts: Laprovíttola 26; Rebs: Şanlı 8 Asts: Veselý, Laprovíttola 4 PIR: Laprovíttola 29	Boxscore	Pts: Parra, Ellenson 14; Rebs: Tomić 7 Asts: Vives 5 PIR: Parra 23	Arena: San Pablo; Attendance: 5,797; Referees: Daniel Hierrezuelo, Jordi Aliaga, Martín Caballero

== Final ==
25 September 2022	Real Madrid	89–83(OT)	Barça	Seville
18:30	Scoring by quarter: 17–15, 12–22, 26–12, 16–22, Overtime: 18–12
	Pts: Tavares 24; Rebs: Tavares 12; Asts: three players 3 PIR: Tavares 40	Boxscore	Pts: Şanlı 21; Rebs: Kalinić 7 Asts: Laprovíttola 14; PIR: Laprovíttola 18	Arena: San Pablo; Attendance: 5,855; Referees: Daniel Hierrezuelo, Antonio Conde, Jordi Aliaga

2022 Supercopa Endesa champions
Real Madrid
9th title
