= 2024 Supercopa de España de Baloncesto =

21st edition of Spanish basketball supercup

2024 Supercopa Endesa^{1}

Tournament details
- Country: Spain
- City: Murcia
- Venue: Palacio de Deportes
- Dates: 21–22 September 2024
- Teams: 4
- Defending champions: Real Madrid

Final positions
- Champions: Unicaja (1st title)
- Runners-up: Real Madrid
- Semifinalists: UCAM Murcia; Barça

Tournament statistics
- Matches played: 3
- Attendance: 22,200 (7,400 per match)

Awards
- MVP: Kameron Taylor (Unicaja)
- ^{1} Sponsored name, referring to Endesa.

The 2024 Supercopa de España de Baloncesto, also known as Supercopa Endesa for sponsorship reasons, was the 21st edition of the Supercopa de España de Baloncesto, an annual basketball competition for clubs in the Spanish basketball league system that were successful in its major competitions in the preceding season.

Real Madrid was the six-time back-to-back defending champion, which was defeated by Unicaja in a huge win to achieve its first supercup title and its second consecutive title after the Intercontinental Cup triumph seven days ago.

All times are in Central European Summer Time (UTC+02:00).

== Qualification ==
The tournament featured the winners from the three major competitions (2023–24 Liga Endesa, 2024 Copa del Rey and 2023 Supercopa Endesa), the host team and the remaining highest ranked teams from the 2023–24 Liga Endesa season if vacant berths exist.

=== Qualified teams ===
The following four teams qualified for the tournament.

| Team | Method of qualification | Appearance | Last appearance as |
|---|---|---|---|
| Real Madrid | Liga Endesa, Copa del Rey and Supercopa Endesa winners | 19th | 2023 winners |
| UCAM Murcia | Host team and Liga Endesa runners-up | 2nd | 2023 semifinalists |
| Unicaja | Liga Endesa third place | 7th | 2023 runners-up |
| Barça | Liga Endesa fourth place | 19th | 2023 semifinalists |

== Venue ==
On June 27, 2024, ACB selected and announced Murcia to host the supercup in September 2024. The arena holds 7,454 people and was built in 1994. It had a budget of 25 million dollars, and was the most modern arena in Europe the moment it was built. The arena hosted the 1996 Copa del Rey, 1998 All-Star weekend and 2023 Supercopa Endesa.

| Murcia | 2024 Supercopa de España de Baloncesto (Spain) |
| Palacio de Deportes | 2024 Supercopa de España de Baloncesto (Spain) |
| Capacity: 7,454 | 2024 Supercopa de España de Baloncesto (Spain) |

== Draw ==
The draw was held on 22 August 2024. Real Madrid and UCAM Murcia as league finalists were the seeded teams.

== Bracket ==
Semifinals
Real Madrid | 89
Barça | 83
UCAM Murcia | 78
Unicaja | 84

Final
Real Madrid | 80
Unicaja | 90

== Semifinals ==
=== Real Madrid vs. Barça ===
Real Madrid qualified for their seventh consecutive finals after winning a closely-contested El Clásico. Real Madrid shined especially in the third quarter, while Barça managed to overcome their worst moments of the match supported by Darío Brizuela and Jabari Parker to end up reaching a tight match that fell to Los Blancos with Campazzo great contribution with 18 points, 6 assists and a decisive steal that was key to the win. Edy Tavares and Džanan Musa were in their line from last season and Serge Ibaka left defensive flashes on his return to Real Madrid. Kevin Punter went from more to less in his debut with Barça.

| 21 September 2024 | Real Madrid | 89–83 | Barça | Murcia |
| 18:30 | Scoring by quarter: 20–18, 21–24, 26–19, 22–22 |
| | Pts: Campazzo 18; Rebs: Deck 10; Asts: Campazzo 6 PIR: Campazzo 33 | Boxscore | Pts: Parker 17; Rebs: Metu 6 Asts: Laprovíttola 8 PIR: Parker 17 | Arena: Palacio de Deportes; Attendance: 7,400; Referees: Carlos Peruga, Fernando Calatrava, Luis Miguel Castillo |

=== UCAM Murcia vs. Unicaja ===
Unicaja returned to the final after beating UCAM Murcia. The squad from Murcia competed very well during the first three quarters, even going ahead in the last one, but their problems controlling the rebound and the defensive work of Unicaja were too much for them, which played a very physical and choral match. Kendrick Perry and Dylan Osetkowski with 17 and 19 points, respectively, made the difference along with a providential Melvin Ejim with his points in the last quarter and they faced against Real Madrid in the final in a later edition of the last year final at the same venue.

Before the start of the match, it was pay tribute to the referee Miguel Ángel Pérez Pérez in his final match after 25 seasons and more than 800 matches managed.

| 21 September 2024 | UCAM Murcia | 78–84 | Unicaja | Murcia |
| 21:30 | Scoring by quarter: 21–20, 16–17, 24–23, 17–24 |
| | Pts: Håkanson 14; Rebs: Birgander 7 Asts: Ennis 5 PIR: R. Kurucs 16 | Boxscore | Pts: Osetkowski 19; Rebs: Osetkowski 7 Asts: Perry 7 PIR: Osetkowski 26 | Arena: Palacio de Deportes; Attendance: 7,400; Referees: Miguel Ángel Pérez Pérez, Emilio Pérez Pizarro, Iyán González |

== Final ==
Unicaja was crowned champion of the supercup for the first time in its history by defeating Real Madrid in a huge win. The team coached by Ibon Navarro, that registered the most scored quarter in the history of the supercup finals, was superior for a long time of the match against Real Madrid that was thick in the offensive and was forced to attack the rim in multiple chances due to its incessant fails from the three-point field goal and with issues with the players from the bench. On the other hand, Unicaja, which played more physically, had more organized ideas and rightly took the title to Málaga.

| 22 September 2024 | Real Madrid | 80–90 | Unicaja | Murcia |
| 20:00 | Scoring by quarter: 19–32, 26–17, 18–19, 17–22 |
| | Pts: Campazzo 19; Rebs: Tavares 13; Asts: Llull 3 PIR: Tavares 16 | Boxscore | Pts: Taylor 22; Rebs: Taylor 6 Asts: Taylor 6 PIR: Taylor 29 | Arena: Palacio de Deportes; Attendance: 7,400; Referees: Carlos Peruga, Sergio Manuel, Iyán González |

== Awards ==
=== MVP ===
| Pos. | Player | Team |
|---|---|---|
| SG | (United States) Kameron Taylor | Unicaja |
