= Xavi Rabaseda =

Spanish basketball player (born 1989)

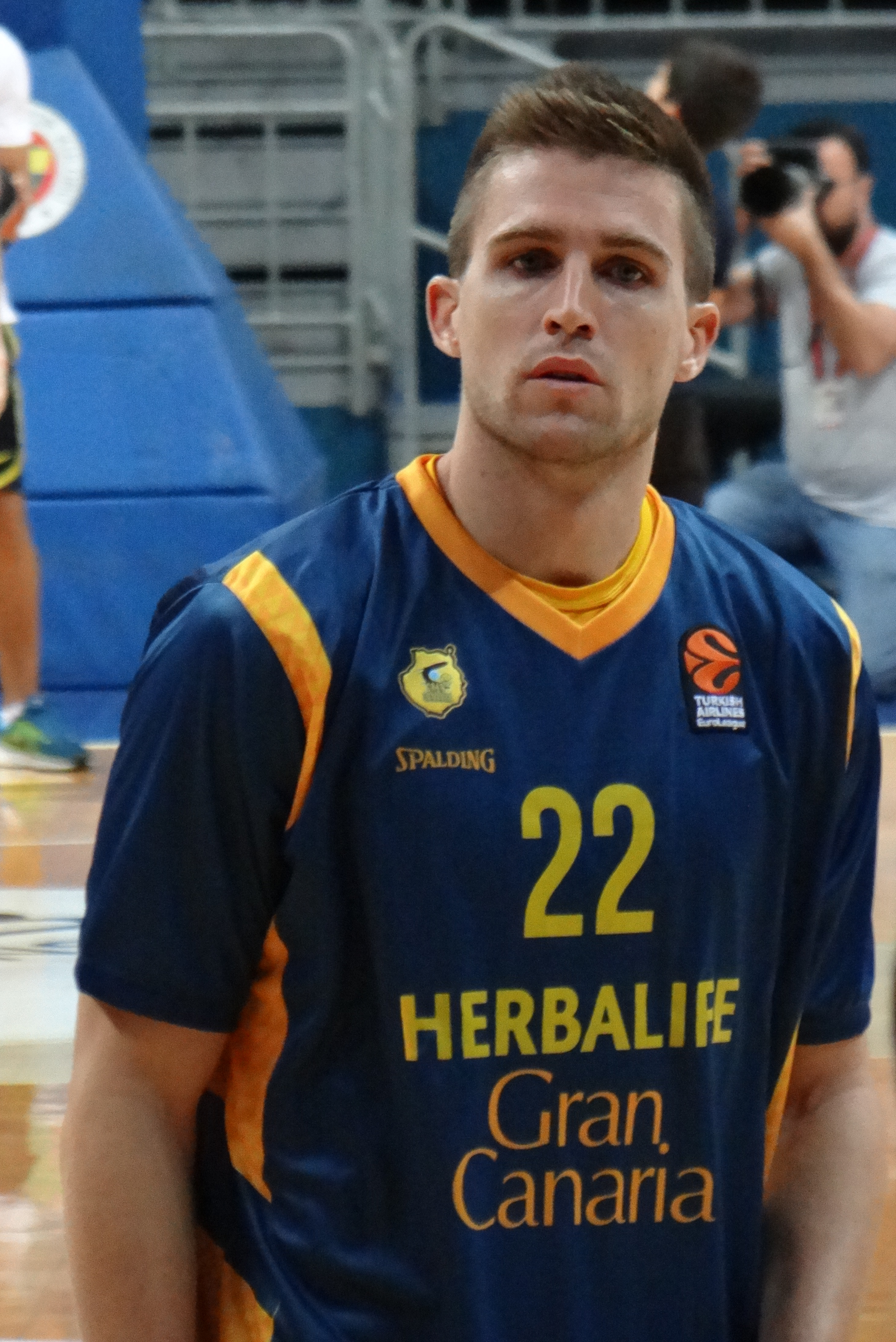
- Rabaseda with Gran Canaria in 2019

Personal information
- Born: February 24, 1989 (age 37) Ripoll, Girona, Spain
- Listed height: 6 ft 6 in (1.98 m)
- Listed weight: 205 lb (93 kg)

Career information
- NBA draft: 2011: undrafted
- Playing career: 2007–2025
- Position: Shooting guard / small forward

Career history
- 2007–2009: CB Cornellà
- 2009–2013: FC Barcelona
- 2010–2011: →Fuenlabrada
- 2013–2015: Estudiantes
- 2015–2020: Gran Canaria
- 2020–2022: San Pablo Burgos
- 2022–2025: Bilbao Basket

Career highlights
- EuroLeague champion (2010); 2× Champions League champion (2020, 2021); FIBA Intercontinental Cup champion (2021); FIBA Europe Cup champion (2025); Liga ACB champion (2012); 2× Spanish Cup winner (2010, 2013); 3× Spanish Supercup winner (2009, 2011, 2016)
Medals
Men's basketball
Representing Spain
World Cup
| Gold medal – first place | 2019 China |
FIBA Europe Under-20 Championship
| Bronze medal – third place | 2009 Greece | U-20 National Team |
FIBA Europe Under-18 Championship
| Bronze medal – third place | 2006 Greece | U-18 National Team |

Xavier "Xavi" Rabaseda Bertrán (born 24 February 1989) is a Spanish professional basketball player who last played for Bilbao Basket of the Liga ACB. He is a 1.98 m (6 ft 6 in) tall shooting guard-small forward.

== Professional career ==
After being formed in the youth teams of FC Barcelona, in 2007, Rabaseda joined CB Cornellà, a team affiliated with Barcelona, to play in the LEB Plata league. After two years, and achieving the promotion to the LEB Oro in 2009, he left Cornellà to join FC Barcelona Bàsquet's roster. Despite only playing limited minutes in three games, he was a part of the Barcelona team that won the EuroLeague's 2009-10 season championship, at that season's Euroleague Final Four in Paris.

In 2010, Rabaseda joined Baloncesto Fuenlabrada on loan. Despite being signed for two years with the team of the Community of Madrid, his good performance (9 points and 3 rebounds per game) was enough to earn him a return to FC Barcelona Bàsquet.

In August 2013, he signed with CB Estudiantes. In July 2015, he signed a two-year deal with Gran Canaria.

On July 8, 2020, he has signed with San Pablo Burgos of the Liga ACB. With Burgos, he won the 2019–20 Basketball Champions League and 2020–21 Basketball Champions League.

On July 15, 2022, he signed with Bilbao Basket of the Liga ACB and the Basketball Champions League.

== Spain national team ==
Rabaseda played with the Spain U-20 national team the 2009 FIBA Europe Under-20 Championship, where he won the bronze medal. He was also selected to that tournament's All-Tournament Team. He has also played with the senior men's Spain national team.

== Career statistics ==
Legend
| GP | Games played | GS | Games started | MPG | Minutes per game |
| FG% | Field-goal percentage | 3P% | 3-point field-goal percentage | FT% | Free-throw percentage |
| RPG | Rebounds per game | APG | Assists per game | SPG | Steals per game |
| BPG | Blocks per game | PPG | Points per game | PIR | Performance index rating |
| **Bold** | Career high |

=== EuroLeague ===
| † | Denotes seasons in which Rabaseda won the EuroLeague |

| Year | Team | GP | GS | MPG | FG% | 3P% | FT% | RPG | APG | SPG | BPG | PPG | PIR |
|---|---|---|---|---|---|---|---|---|---|---|---|---|---|
| 2009–10† | Barcelona | 3 | 0 | 2.3 | .333 | .000 | **1.000** | — | .3 | — | — | 1.3 | 1.0 |
| 2011–12 | Barcelona | 13 | 0 | 10.2 | .290 | .235 | .333 | 1.5 | .6 | .3 | .2 | 1.8 | 1.5 |
| 2012–13 | Barcelona | 22 | 1 | 10.5 | **.511** | .292 | .800 | 1.1 | .2 | .5 | — | 2.7 | 2.0 |
| 2018–19 | Gran Canaria | **28** | **19** | **20.0** | .408 | **.321** | .765 | **2.3** | **1.3** | **1.2** | **.3** | **6.2** | **6.0** |
| Career | | 66 | 20 | 14.1 | .412 | .299 | .723 | 1.7 | .7 | .7 | .2 | 3.9 | 3.5 |
