= 2007 Supercopa de España de Baloncesto =

The 2007 Supercopa de España de Baloncesto, or Spanish Basketball Super Cup, was the fourth time that the competition was organized by the Asociación de Clubs de Baloncesto (ACB) and the eighth time it was held since it was established. The basketball tournament, won by TAU Cerámica, took place in the Bizkaia Arena in the city of Baracaldo in Bilbao, Spain on September 28 and 29, 2007. Four Liga ACB teams took part in the tournament:

- Bilbao Basket - Host team
- Real Madrid - 2006/2007 Liga ACB Champions
- AXA FC Barcelona - 2006/2007 Copa del Rey de Baloncesto Champions
- TAU Cerámica - 3rd in the ACB League Play-Off 2006/2007 and team with the best national and international competition rankings

Since the ACB began hosting the tournament in 2004, TAU Cerámica had won every year except the first, when AXA FC Barcelona was crowned champion. In the 2007 tournament semifinals, TAU Cerámica beat Real Madrid and Bilbao Basket won against AXA FC Barcelona. TAU Cerámica then beat Bilbao Basket in the championship game with a final score of 85–73.

== Venue ==
On May 21, 2007, it was announced that Baracaldo (Vizcaya) would host the 2007 Spanish Basketball Super Cup. The event took place in the Bilbao Exhibition Center (BEC), where Bilbao Basket plays their matches. The venue had already hosted matches for the Liga ACB, such as the historic match between Lagun Aro and TAU Cerámica, in which the record attendance for a league match was broken with 15,414 spectators.

The planning council for the event was jointly led by the ACB, Bilbao Government, and Vizcaya Provincial Council, and allowed for the ACB to evaluate the venue's organizational capabilities and the BEC’s attributes for the 2009 or 2010 Copa del Rey’s Basketball celebration.

== Semifinals ==
The semifinals of the Spanish Super Cup were held on September 28, 2007. Bilbao Basket faced AXA FC Barcelona and Real Madrid played TAU Cerámica.

Real Madrid faced TAU Cerámica in the first game of the afternoon. However, the meeting was preceded with strong controversy because of Will McDonald’s passport. The Liga ACB allowed McDonald to play because an individual does not occupy a non-European Union spot when married to a Spanish player. However, the Spanish Basketball Federation thought the opposite, even though they sent him a letter granting him permission to play with the understanding that the tournament is not official.

The match was decided in the last few minutes. TAU Cerámica, coached by Neven Spahija, was eleven points behind in the second quarter (39-28), seven in the third (57-50), six in the final period (67-61) and still four points short at the three-minute mark (73-69). However, Pablo Prigioni led his team well, adding 18 points. Additionally, a few other players stood out. Darko Planinić did well in the first half, Tiago Splitter controlled the second half, and James Singleton played well overall. For Real Madrid, coached by Joan Plaza, Louis Bullock played the lead role, contributing 27 points, but Felipe Reyes' skills and a 3-pointer from Teltotovic at the end gave TAU Cerámica the victory. The final result was 82–83.

In the other semifinal, Bilbao Basket clearly dominated AXA FC Barcelona, a team who seemed surprised by Txus Vidorreta's players. At the beginning of the game, Bilbao Basket pulled away with a score of 18–4, but a 14–0 run by AXA FC Barcelona equalized the match. The Catalans began to dominate the game 25-24 after a great dunk by the Croatian, Mario Kasun, and without Marcelinho Huertas on the court, Bilbao did not score. However, two three-pointers by Huertas and Quincy Lewis put Bilbao ahead again (34-27), a split they maintained until the break (38-29 at the 20-minute mark) and later on as well (51-43 at the 28-minute mark). Bilbao Basket did not give up and always maintained a favorable score split as evident in the third period score, 58-49.

The most notable players throughout the match were Marcelinho Huertas, who played a great first half; Fred Weis, who dominated the entire match under the boards; as well as Javier Salgado and Martin Rančík. For AXA FC Barcelona, coached by Duško Ivanović, the most notable player was the Slovenian, Jaka Lakovič. Pepe Sanchez and Mario Kasun also played a good game. The semifinal ended with a final score of 74–67.

September 28
19:00

Semifinal 1

Real Madrid	82–83	TAU Cerámica
Scoring by quarter: 29–17, 13–24
Pts: Bullock 27; Rebs: Hervelle 8 Asts: Bullock 3		Pts: Prigioni 20; Rebs: McDonald 6 Asts: Prigioni 5

Bizkaia Arena, Bilbao
Attendance: 8,500
Referees: J.C. Mitjana, M.A. Pérez Pérez, V. Bultó (Spain)

September 28
21:30

Semifinal 2

Iurbentia Bilbao	74–67	AXA FC Barcelona
Scoring by quarter: 22–11, 16–18, 20–20, 16–18
Pts: Huertas 16; Rebs: Weis 6 Asts: Huertas 4		Pts: Lakovič 23; Rebs: İlyasova 9 Asts: Sánchez 8

Bizkaia Arena, Bilbao
Attendance: 11,500
Referees: J.C. Arteaga, J.A. Martín Bertrán, D. Hierrezuelo (Spain)

== Final ==
The Super Cup final took place on September 29, 2007, between Bilbao Basket and TAU Cerámica, two teams from Basque Country, Spain. The game began at 7:30 p.m. and not long after, Bilbao Basket's player, Luke Recker, was injured. In the first quarter, TAU Cerámica played well thanks to the efforts of Simas Jasaitis and Igor Rakočević. The quarter ended with a three-pointer from Pablo Prigioni which put TAU Cerámica up 24-19.

In the second quarter, Bilbao Basket made various defensive mistakes upon which Tiago Splitter and Simas Jasaitis capitalized. TAU Cerámica managed to take the lead with a score of 50–37 at the half. In the second half, Rakočević continued having great success, and two unsportsmanlike fouls from Frédéric Weis and Quincy Lewis gave TAU Cerámica an even greater lead, putting them up 18 points for a score of 64–46 at one point. James Singleton was injured due to the severity of Lewis’ foul, resulting in him leaving the court with the help of two teammates. Luke Recker, one of Bilbao’s players, had also previously been injured. The last quarter arrived with a score of 68–56 in favor of TAU Cerámica. Drago Pašalić reanimated Bilbao Basket, but it was not enough. Marcelinho Huertas y Paco Vázquez also tried, but TAU Cerámica showed resilience and ended up winning 85-73. Neven Spahija won his first Spanish title after having done so in Croatia, Slovenia, Lithuania, and Israel.

TVE2 (Spain)

September 29
21:30

Final

Iurbentia Bilbao	73–85	TAU Cerámica
Scoring by quarter: 19–24, 18–26, 19–18, 17–17
Pts: Huertas 18; Rebs: Pasalić 6 Asts: Salgado 4		Pts: Rakočević 23; Rebs: Splitter 7 Asts: Prigioni 7

Bizkaia Arena, Bilbao
Attendance: 12,200
Referees: J.C. Arteaga, Fco. De La Maza, D. Hierrezuelo (Spain)

MVP: Tiago Splitter of TAU Cerámica

Supercopa de España 2007
Champions
TAU Cerámica
Third title

== See also ==
- Supercopa de España de Baloncesto
- ACB
