= Darko Planinić =

Croatian basketball player

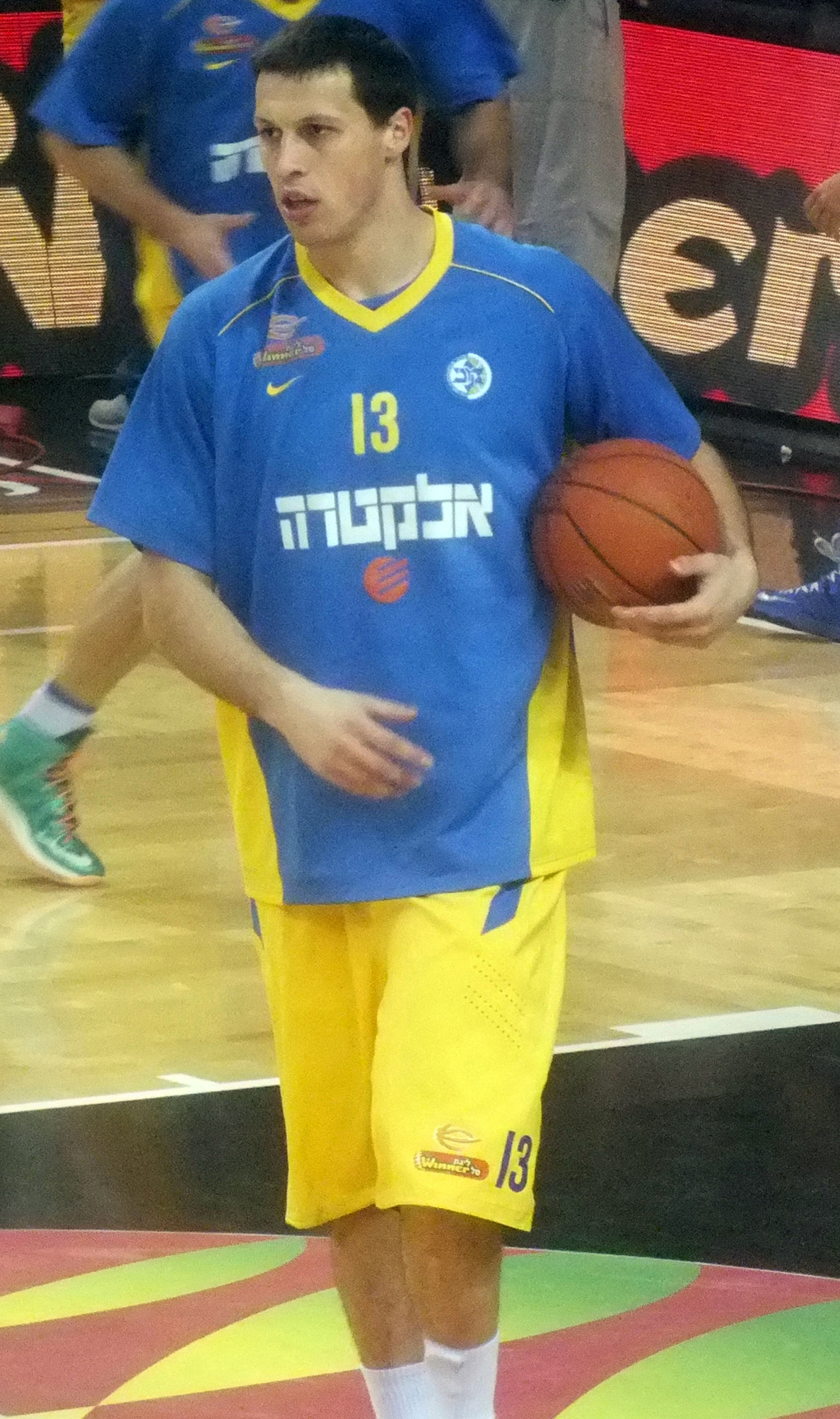

No. 0 – Šibenka
- Position: Center
- League: Croatian League

Personal information
- Born: 22 November 1990 (age 35) Mostar, SR Bosnia and Herzegovina, SFR Yugoslavia
- Listed height: 2.11 m (6 ft 11 in)
- Listed weight: 120 kg (265 lb)

Career information
- NBA draft: 2012: undrafted
- Playing career: 2009–present

Career history
- 2009–2012: Široki
- 2012–2014: Maccabi Tel Aviv
- 2013–2014: → Cibona
- 2014–2015: Budućnost Podgorica
- 2015–2016: Laboral Kutxa
- 2016–2017: Gran Canaria
- 2017–2018: Dinamo Sassari
- 2018–2019: Stelmet Zielona Góra
- 2019–2020: U-BT Cluj-Napoca
- 2020: Zadar
- 2020–2021: Cibona
- 2021–2022: Petkim Spor
- 2022–2023: CSO Voluntari
- 2023: Suke Lions
- 2023: Al-Fateh
- 2023–2024: Krka
- 2024: Guangxi Rhinos
- 2024–2025: Široki
- 2025–present: Šibenka

Career highlights
- Adriatic League champion (2014); 4× Bosnian League champion (2009–2012); Israeli League champion (2013); Montenegrin League champion (2015); 2× Bosnian Cup winner (2011, 2012); Israeli Cup winner (2013); Montenegrin Cup winner (2015); Spanish Supercup winner (2016)
Medals
Men's basketball
Representing Croatia
World U-19 Championship
Bronze medal – third place	2009 New Zealand	U-19 Team
European U-18 Championship
Bronze medal – third place	2008 Greece	U-18 Team

Darko Planinić (born 22 November 1990) is a Croatian professional basketball player for the Šibenka of the Croatian League. Standing at 2.11 m, he plays at the center position.

== Professional career ==
Planinić start playing basketball and played from season 2008 to season 2012 for his hometown club Široki.

For season 2012–13 he move to Israel Maccabi Tel Aviv after he has signe for season 2013–14 to Cibona.

Season 2014–15 he spent in Budućnost Podgorica

Season 2015–16 he move to Spain an sign with Laboral Kutxa

Season 2016–17 he is still in Spain playing for Gran Canaria

Season 2017–18 he has signed in Italy for Dinamo Sassari

Season 2018–19 he has signed in Poland Stelmet Zielona Góra

Season 2019–20 he has signed for Romania powerhouse team U-BT Cluj-Napoca and averaged 15.9 points and 5 rebounds per game.

Season 2020–21 signed open contract with Zadar on 28 August 2020.

On 29 November 2020, he has signed with Cibona of the ABA League.

On 9 July 2021, he has signed with Petkim Spor of the Turkish Basketball Super League.

On 20 June 2022, he has signed with CSO Voluntari of the Liga Națională.

In October 2023, Planinić signed with Al-Fateh of the Saudi League.

In December 2023, Planinić signed with Krka of the Slovenian Basketball League and ABA League for the remainder of the 2023–24 season.

On 14 November 2024, Planinić signed with the Široki of the Bosnian League.
