= 2004 Supercopa de España de Baloncesto =

The Supercopa de Baloncesto 2004 was disputed in Málaga, Andalusia and began with the following semifinals.

== Semifinals ==
September 25, 2004:

TAU Cerámica 75 - 76 Real Madrid : (Official Match Recap)

Unicaja 62 - 70 FC Barcelona : (Official Match Recap)

== Third and Fourth Place ==
September 26, 2004:

Unicaja 70 - 56 TAU Cerámica : (Official Match Recap)

== Final ==
September 26, 2004:

Real Madrid 75 - 76 (OT) FC Barcelona : (Official Match Recap)

MVP: Dejan Bodiroga of FC Barcelona

Supercopa de España 2004
Champions
FC Barcelona
Second title

== See also ==
- Supercopa de España de Baloncesto
- ACB
