= Simon Birgander =

Swedish basketball player

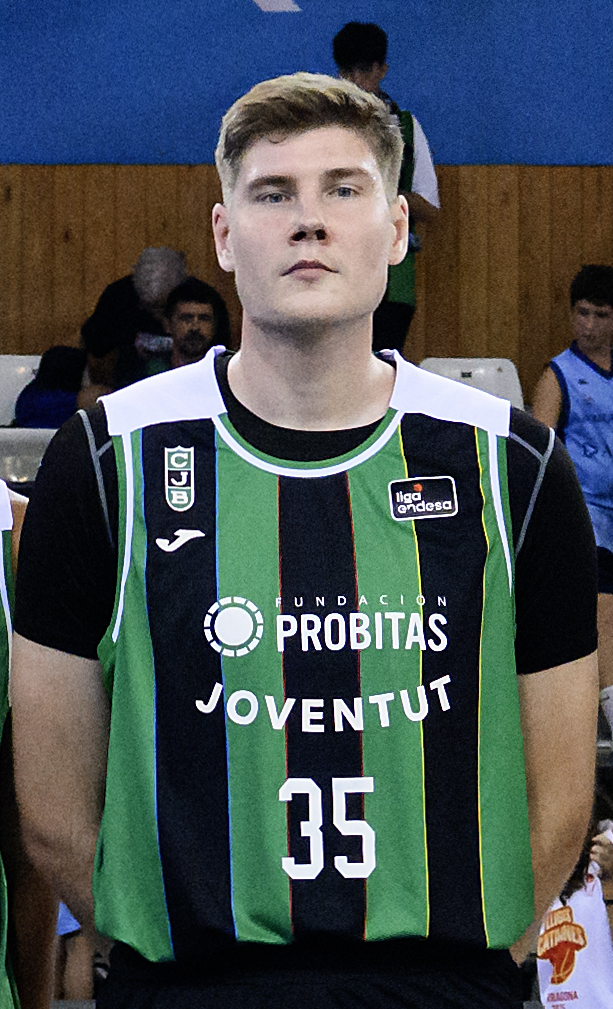
- Birgander with Joventut in 2025

No. 35 – Joventut Badalona
- Position: Center
- League: Liga ACB

Personal information
- Born: 23 October 1997 (age 28) Kvistofta, Helsingborg, Sweden
- Listed height: 2.09 m (6 ft 10 in)

Career information
- NBA draft: 2017: undrafted
- Playing career: 2015–present

Career history
- 2015–2016: Helsingborg BBK
- 2016–2017: Clavijo
- 2017–2023: Joventut Badalona
- 2023–2025: UCAM Murcia
- 2025–present: Joventut Badalona

Career highlights
- ACB All-Young Players Team (2018); Spanish Supercup winner (2026)

Simon Fredrik Stefan Birgander (born 23 October 1997) is a Swedish professional basketball player for Joventut Badalona in the Spanish Liga ACB.

== Professional career ==
He cut his teeth in the youth ranks of Helsingborg Basket in his native Sweden before making his debut in the country's second-tier league Basketettan in the early stages of the 2015–16 season. He had a tremendous presence inside in terms of blocking shots (5.8 bpg) in Basketettan play, while averaging 11.7 points and 13.5 rebounds per contest (12 games played).

Birgander left Sweden in January 2016 to head to Spain, where he joined CB Clavijo of the LEB Gold, the second-tier division. He was also made eligible to play for EBA side Natural Rioja Vintage Clavijo. In EBA play, he was a major contributor on the defensive end of the court, averaging 3.6 blocks a game in 14 games of the 2015–16 campaign, while scoring 7.4 points and pulling down 9.3 rebounds per outing.

In April 2017, Birgander put his name into the 2017 NBA draft. Two months later, he became one of only 10 international underclassmen to remain in the NBA Draft that year. However, he went undrafted. He signed with Joventut de Badalona of the Spanish top-flight Liga ACB in July 2017. In 2019 and 2020, he was injured (knee) and unable to play for a total of 352 days.

On July 1, 2023, Birgander signed with another Liga ACB side, UCAM Murcia.

On July 9, 2025, Birgander returned to Joventut Badalona, signing a two season contract with an option for a further one.

== International career ==
Birgander was a key member of the Swedish under-18 national team who won gold at the 2015 Division B European Championship, averaging 3.8 points, 6.0 boards as well as a tournament-high 2.5 blocks a game. In 2016, he averaged 7.9 points, 6.9 rebounds and 1.1 blocks per contest at the under-20 European Championships in Finland.

== Career statistics ==
=== National team ===
Team	Tournament	Pos.	GP	PPG	RPG	APG
Sweden	EuroBasket 2025	16th	5	11.0	8.4	3.4
