= Will McDonald (basketball) =

American basketball player (born 1979)

Personal information
- Born: October 5, 1979 (age 47) New Orleans, Louisiana, U.S.
- Listed height: 6 ft 11 in (2.11 m)
- Listed weight: 265 lb (120 kg)

Career information
- High school: Joseph S. Clark (New Orleans, Louisiana)
- College: South Florida (1999–2003)
- NBA draft: 2003: undrafted
- Playing career: 2003–2020
- Position: Power forward / center

Career history
- 2003–2004: Élan Chalon
- 2004–2005: Gran Canaria
- 2005–2007: Estudiantes
- 2007–2009: Tau Ceramica
- 2009–2010: Gran Canaria
- 2010–2011: DKV Joventut
- 2011–2012: Fujian Xunxing
- 2012: Petron Blaze Boosters
- 2012: Mets de Guaynabo
- 2012–2013: Fujian Xunxing
- 2013: Cangrejeros de Santurce
- 2013–2014: Fujian Xunxing
- 2014–2015: Jiangsu Monkey King
- 2015: Jiangsu Dragons
- 2016: Caciques de Humacao
- 2016–2017: Jiangsu Dragons
- 2017: Boca Juniors
- 2017–2018: Yokohama B-Corsairs
- 2018–2019: San-en NeoPhoenix
- 2019–2020: Yokohama B-Corsairs

Career highlights
- Liga ACB champion (2008); Spanish Supercup winner (2008); Spanish Cup winner (2009)

William McDonald (born October 5, 1979) is an American former professional basketball player. He graduated from the University of South Florida.

In March 2012, McDonald was ejected from a game while playing for Petron Blaze Boosters. During an 80–94 loss to Barako Bull Energy, McDonald was ejected for throwing the ball into Mick Pennisi's forehead. The ejection trended on YouTube because of Pennisi's 'delayed flop'.

McDonald was drafted 5th overall in the 2019 BIG3 draft by the Ball Hogs. In that year's season, McDonald ranked fourth in scoring and second in rebounding among all players in the league.

== The Basketball Tournament ==
William McDonald played for Overseas Elite in the 2018 edition of The Basketball Tournament. In four games, he averaged 3.5 points per game and 3.3 rebounds per game on 67 percent shooting. Overseas Elite reached the championship game and played Eberlein Drive, winning 70-58 for their fourth consecutive TBT Title.

== Career statistics ==
Legend
GP	Games played	GS	Games started	MPG	Minutes per game
FG%	Field-goal percentage	3P%	3-point field-goal percentage	FT%	Free-throw percentage
RPG	Rebounds per game	APG	Assists per game	SPG	Steals per game
BPG	Blocks per game	PPG	Points per game	PIR	Performance index rating
**Bold**	Career high

=== EuroLeague ===
*	Led the league

Year	Team	GP	GS	MPG	FG%	3P%	FT%	RPG	APG	SPG	BPG	PPG	PIR
2007–08	Baskonia	**24**	12	17.8	.559	—	**.634**	**4.6**	.6	.5	.6	8.9	9.1
2008–09	Baskonia	21	**21***	**21.1**	**.579**	**.357**	.625	4.2	**.9**	**.7**	**1.0**	**9.0**	**10.0**
Career		45	33	19.3	.568	.357	.631	4.4	.7	.6	.8	9.0	9.5
