= 2021 Supercopa de España de Baloncesto =

2021 Supercopa Endesa^{1}

Tournament details
- Country: Spain
- Venue(s): Santiago Martín; La Laguna
- Dates: 11–12 September 2021
- Teams: 4
- Defending champions: Real Madrid

Final positions
- Champions: Real Madrid (8th title)
- Runner-up: Barça
- Semifinalists: Lenovo Tenerife; Valencia Basket

Tournament statistics
- Matches played: 3
- Attendance: 6,600 (2,200 per match)

Awards
- MVP: Sergio Llull (Real Madrid)
- ^{1} Sponsored name, referring to Endesa.

The 2021 Supercopa de España de Baloncesto, also known as Supercopa Endesa for sponsorship reasons, was the 18th edition of the Supercopa de España de Baloncesto, an annual basketball competition for clubs in the Spanish basketball league system that were successful in its major competitions in the preceding season.

Real Madrid defended successfully the title and conquered its fourth consecutive Supercup, 8th overall.

All times were in Western European Summer Time (UTC+01:00).

== Qualification ==
The tournament featured the winners from the three major competitions (2020–21 Liga Endesa, 2021 Copa del Rey and 2020 Supercopa Endesa), the host team and the remaining highest ranked teams from the 2020–21 Liga Endesa season if vacant berths exist.

=== Qualified teams ===
The following four teams qualified for the tournament.

Team	Method of qualification	Appearance	Last appearance as
Barça	2020–21 Liga Endesa and 2021 Copa del Rey champion	16th	2020 runners-up
Real Madrid	2020 Supercopa Endesa champion	16th	2020 winners
Lenovo Tenerife	Host team	2nd	2020 semifinalist
Valencia Basket	2020–21 Liga Endesa fourth place	6th	2019 semifinalist

== Venue ==
On July 16, 2021, ACB selected and announced Tenerife to host the supercup in September 2021. The venue can hold 5,100 people for basketball games, and it offers 2,000 square meters of floor space. The facilities remain open all year long, without interruption. The pavilion also provides the following facilities for athletic use: 5 large locker rooms and 4 double locker rooms. Additionally, a gymnasium, infirmary, video and press room are available as well as a rehab room for athletes. The arena hosted the 2017 Champions League Final Four, as Iberostar Tenerife hosted the tournament in which Tenerife won its first Champions League title. The arena also hosted the 2017 Intercontinental Cup final match between Tenerife and Guaros de Lara. The arena was also used a host venue of the 2018 Women's World Cup, and the 2020 Intercontinental Cup. The arena previously hosted the supercup in 2020.

2021 Supercopa de España de Baloncesto (Spain, Canary Islands)
La Laguna
Santiago Martín
Capacity: 5,100

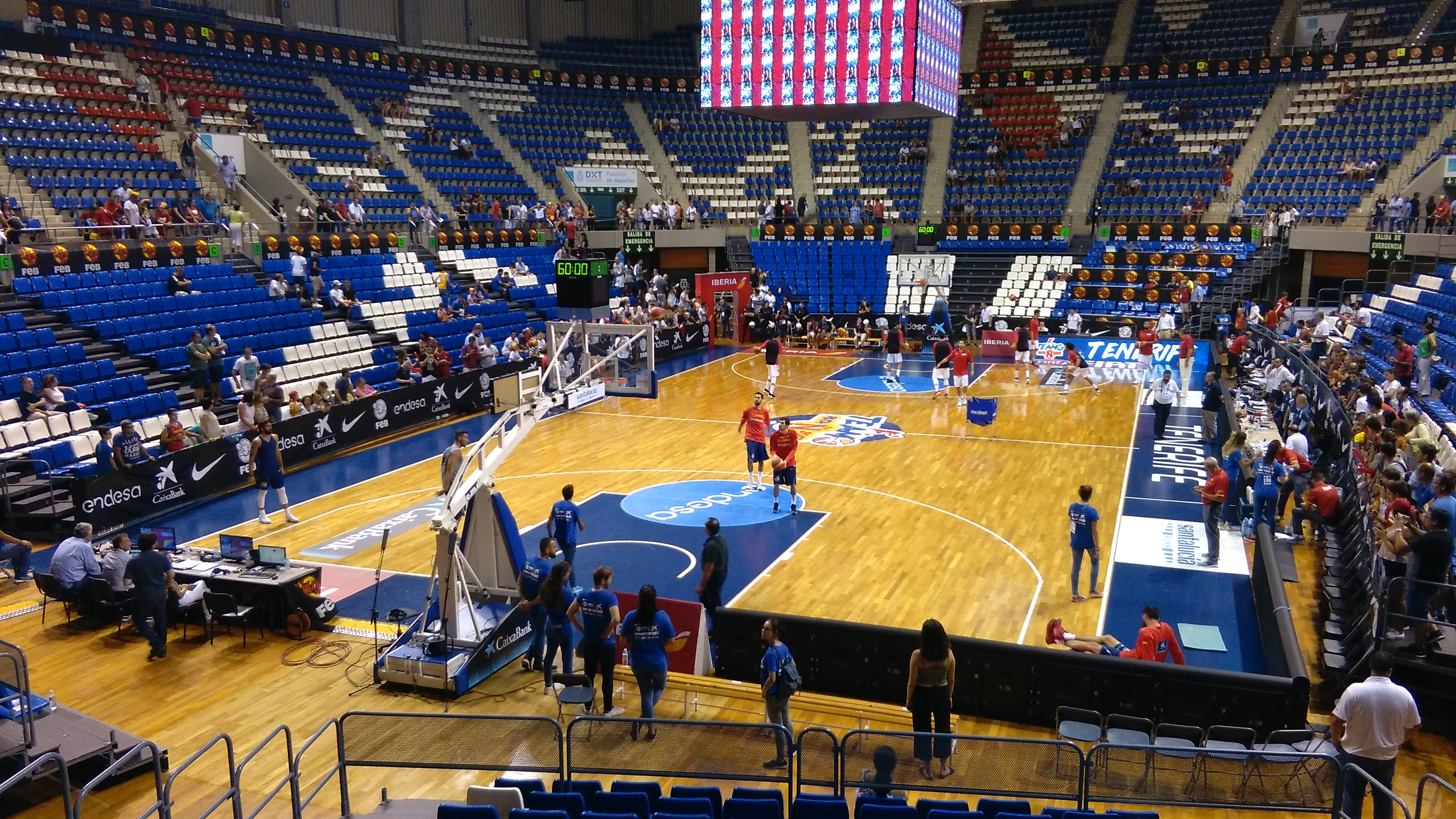

== Draw ==
The draw was held on 17 August 2021. Barça as the league and cup champion and Real Madrid as supercup champion were the seeded teams.

== Bracket ==
Semifinals
Barça	87
Valencia Basket	68
Lenovo Tenerife	70
Real Madrid	72

Final
Barça	83
Real Madrid	88

== Semifinals ==
=== Barça vs. Valencia Basket ===
11 September 2021	Barça	87–68	Valencia Basket	La Laguna
19:00	Scoring by quarter: 27–16, 18–12, 22–16, 20–24
	Pts: Davies 15; Rebs: three players 5 Asts: Calathes 6 PIR: Davies 20	Boxscore	Pts: Hermannsson, Puerto 11; Rebs: Dubljević 7 Asts: Hermannsson 3 PIR: Hermannsson 13	Arena: Santiago Martín; Attendance: 2,200; Referees: Carlos Peruga, Luis Miguel Castillo, Martín Caballero

=== Lenovo Tenerife vs. Real Madrid ===
11 September 2021	Lenovo Tenerife	70–72	Real Madrid	La Laguna
22:00	Scoring by quarter: 21–14, 16–17, 16–17, 17–24
	Pts: Shermadini 21; Rebs: Doornekamp 6 Asts: Huertas 6 PIR: Shermadini 21	Boxscore	Pts: Yabusele 15; Rebs: Yabusele 8 Asts: Heurtel 3 PIR: Yabusele 17	Arena: Santiago Martín; Attendance: 2,200; Referees: Antonio Conde, Fernando Calatrava, Arnau Padrós

== Final ==
12 September 2021	Barça	83–88	Real Madrid	La Laguna
18:30	Scoring by quarter: 23–22, 23–18, 25–22, 12–26
	Pts: Higgins 16; Rebs: Mirotić, Oriola 5 Asts: Calathes 7 PIR: Calathes 18	Boxscore	Pts: Llull 24; Rebs: Poirier 11; Asts: Williams-Goss, Yabusele 3 PIR: Llull 27	Arena: Santiago Martín; Attendance: 2,200; Referees: Emilio Pérez Pizarro, Carlos Peruga, Luis Miguel Castillo

2021 Supercopa Endesa champions
Real Madrid
8th title
