= 2020 Supercopa de España de Baloncesto =

2020 Supercopa Endesa^{1}

Tournament details
- Country: Spain
- City: La Laguna
- Venue(s): Santiago Martín
- Dates: 12–13 September 2020
- Teams: 4
- Defending champions: Real Madrid

Final positions
- Champions: Real Madrid (7th title)
- Runner-up: Barça
- Semifinalists: TD Systems Baskonia; Iberostar Tenerife

Tournament statistics
- Matches played: 3

Awards
- MVP: Facundo Campazzo (Real Madrid)
- ^{1} Sponsored name, referring to Endesa.

The 2020 Supercopa de España de Baloncesto, also known as Supercopa Endesa for sponsorship reasons, was the 17th edition of the Supercopa de España de Baloncesto, an annual basketball competition for clubs in the Spanish basketball league system that were successful in its major competitions in the preceding season. All matches were played behind closed doors due to the COVID-19 pandemic.

Real Madrid defended successfully the title and conquered its third consecutive Supercup, 7th overall.

All times were in Western European Summer Time (UTC+01:00).

== Qualification ==
The tournament featured the winners from the three major competitions (2019–20 Liga Endesa, 2020 Copa del Rey and 2019 Supercopa Endesa), the host team and the remaining highest ranked teams from the 2019–20 Liga Endesa season if vacant berths exist.

=== Qualified teams ===
The following four teams qualified for the tournament.

Team	Method of qualification	Appearance	Last appearance as
TD Systems Baskonia	2019–20 Liga Endesa champion	13th	2018 runners-up
Real Madrid	2020 Copa del Rey and 2019 Supercopa Endesa champion	15th	2019 winners
Iberostar Tenerife	Host team	1st	Debut
Barça	2019–20 Liga Endesa runner-up	15th	2019 runners-up

== Venue ==
On May 16, 2019, ACB selected and announced Tenerife to host the supercup in September 2020. The venue can hold 5,000 people for basketball games, and it offers 2,000 square meters of floor space. The facilities remain open all year long, without interruption. The pavilion also provides the following facilities for athletic use: 5 large locker rooms and 4 double locker rooms. Additionally, a gymnasium, infirmary, video and press room are available as well as a rehab room for athletes. The arena hosted the 2017 Champions League Final Four, as Iberostar Tenerife hosted the tournament in which Tenerife won its first Champions League title. The arena also hosted the 2017 Intercontinental Cup final match between Tenerife and Guaros de Lara. The arena was also used a host venue of the 2018 Women's World Cup, and the 2020 Intercontinental Cup.

2020 Supercopa de España de Baloncesto (Spain, Canary Islands)
La Laguna
Santiago Martín

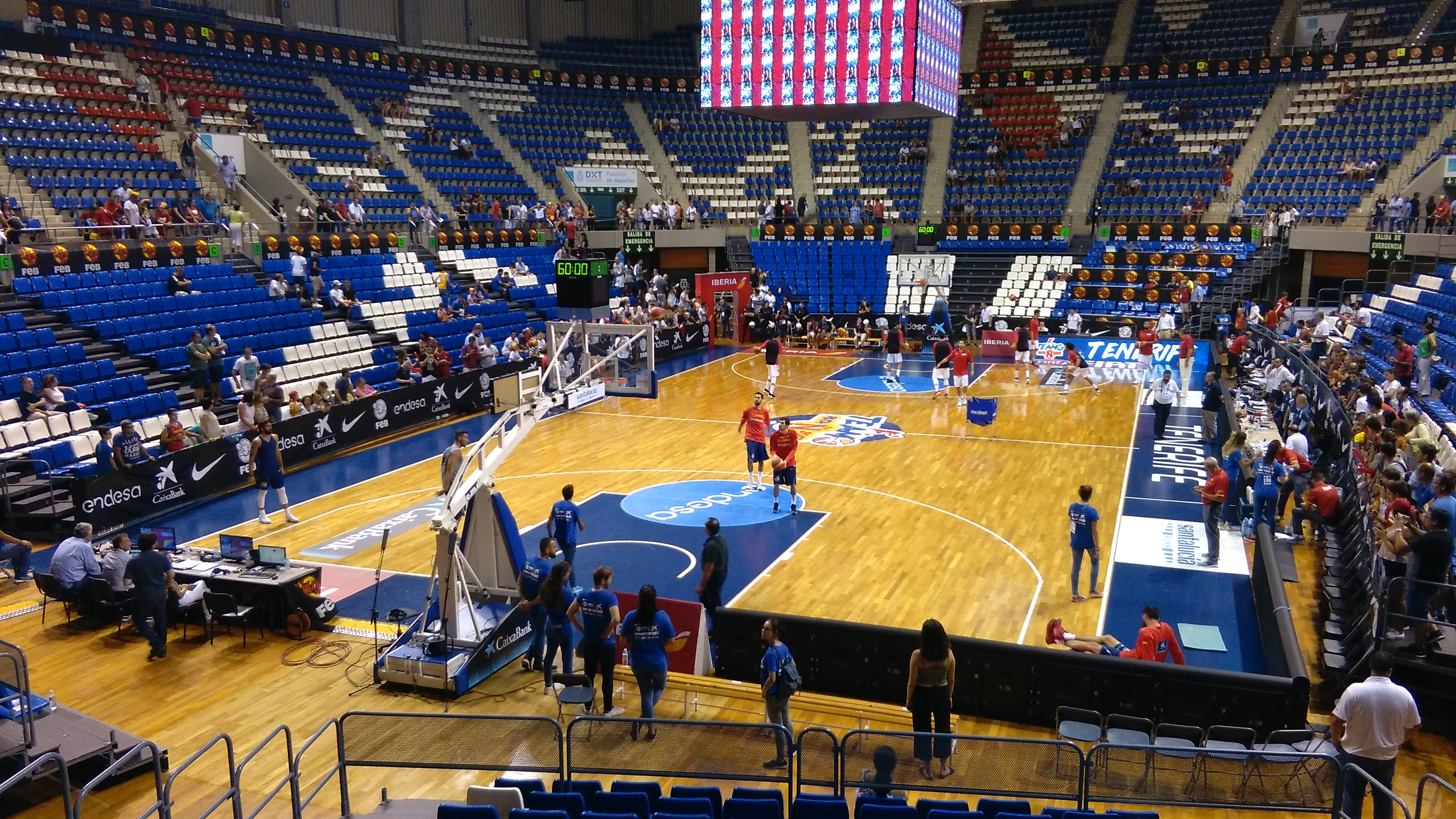

== Draw ==
The draw was held on 29 July 2020 in Tenerife, Spain. TD Systems Baskonia as the league champion and Real Madrid as cup champion were the seeded teams.

== Bracket ==
Semifinals
Iberostar Tenerife	79
Real Madrid	92
TD Systems Baskonia	68
Barça	72

Final
Real Madrid	72
Barça	67

== Semifinals ==
=== TD Systems Baskonia vs. Barça ===
12 September 2020	TD Systems Baskonia	68–72	Barça	La Laguna
17:30	Scoring by quarter: 14–22, 14–13, 17–25, 23–12
	Pts: Peters, Vildoza 14; Rebs: three players 5 Asts: Henry 5 PIR: Peters 15	Boxscore	Pts: Abrines 19; Rebs: Mirotić 6 Asts: Calathes 8 PIR: Abrines 19	Arena: Santiago Martín; Referees: José Antonio Martín, Carlos Peruga, Sergio Manuel

=== Iberostar Tenerife vs. Real Madrid ===
12 September 2020	Iberostar Tenerife	79–92	Real Madrid	La Laguna
20:30	Scoring by quarter: 18–23, 24–25, 17–22, 20–22
	Pts: Huertas 17; Rebs: Sulejmanović 8 Asts: Huertas 5 PIR: Huertas 16	Boxscore	Pts: Fernández 18; Rebs: Randolph 8 Asts: Campazzo 7 PIR: Fernández 18	Arena: Santiago Martín; Referees: José Ramón García, Fernando Calatrava, Jordi Aliaga

== Final ==
13 September 2020	Real Madrid	72–67	Barça	La Laguna
17:30	Scoring by quarter: 18–14, 13–18, 19–17, 22–18
	Pts: Campazzo 21; Rebs: Tavares 7 Asts: Campazzo 2 PIR: Campazzo 18	Boxscore	Pts: Mirotić 22; Rebs: Davies 8 Asts: three players 3 PIR: Mirotić 26	Arena: Santiago Martín; Referees: Carlos Peruga, Óscar Perea, Sergio Manuel

2020 Supercopa Endesa champions
Real Madrid
7th title
