= Kameron Taylor =

American basketball player (born 1994)

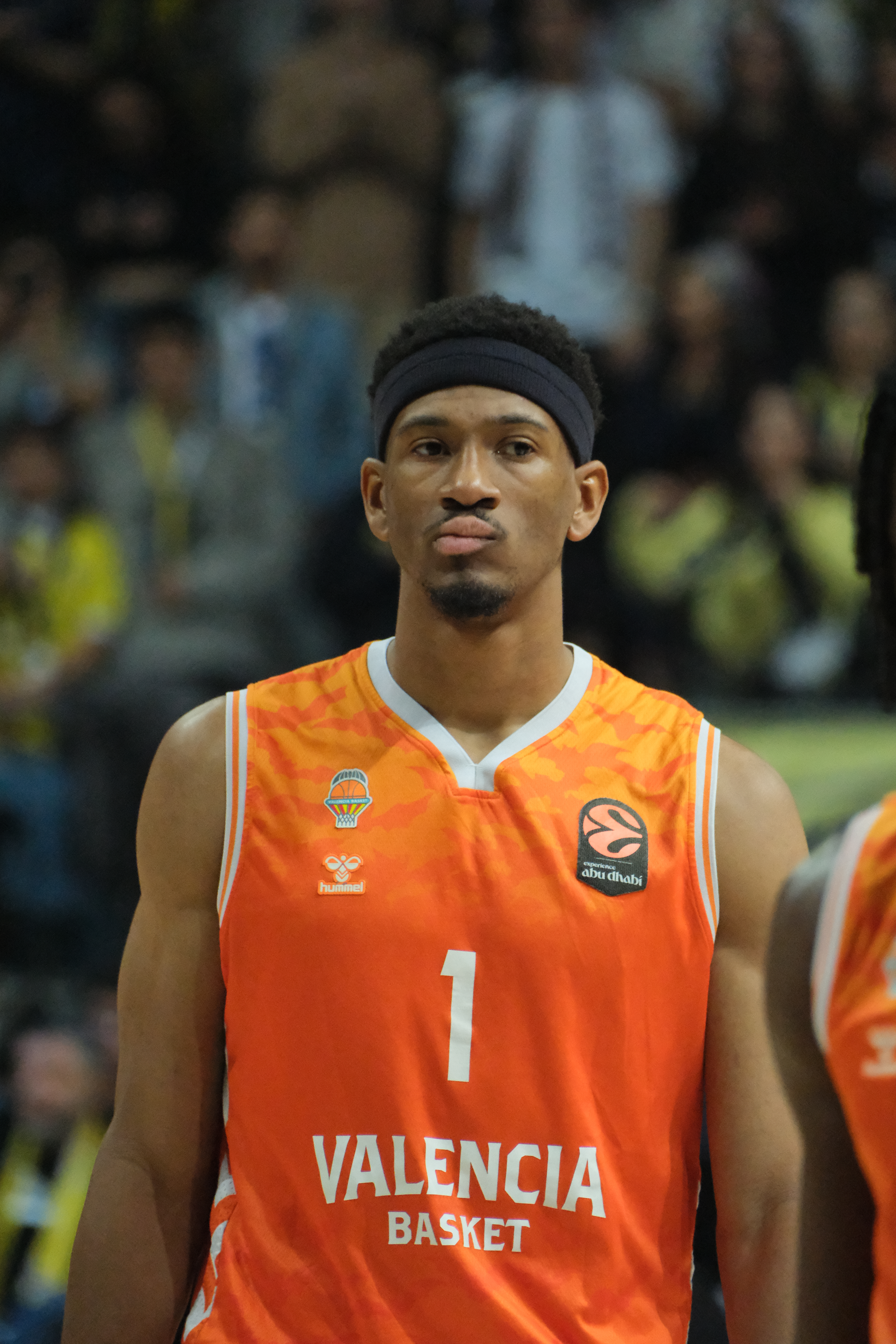
- Taylor with Valencia Basket in 2026

No. 1 – Valencia Basket
- Position: Small forward
- League: Liga ACB; EuroLeague

Personal information
- Born: October 5, 1994 (age 32) Hyattsville, Maryland, U.S.
- Listed height: 6 ft 6 in (1.98 m)
- Listed weight: 200 lb (91 kg)

Career information
- High school: DeMatha Catholic (Hyattsville, Maryland)
- College: Seton Hill (2012–2016)
- NBA draft: 2016: undrafted
- Playing career: 2016–present

Career history
- 2016–2017: Erdgas Ehingen
- 2017–2018: Dragons Rhöndorf
- 2018: s.Oliver Würzburg
- 2018–2019: PVSK Panthers
- 2019–2020: Brose Bamberg
- 2020–2021: Hamburg Towers
- 2021–2022: Maccabi Tel Aviv
- 2022: →SIG Strasbourg
- 2022–2023: Bàsquet Girona
- 2023–2025: Unicaja
- 2025–present: Valencia

Career highlights
- FIBA Intercontinental Cup champion (2024); 2× FIBA Champions League champion (2024, 2025); Liga ACB champion (2026); Spanish Cup winner (2025); 2× Spanish Supercup winner (2024, 2025); All-Liga ACB Second Team (2025); Spanish Supercup MVP (2024); Hungarian NB I/A steals leader (2019); German ProB leading scorer (2018); First-team All-PSAC West (2016)

Kameron Milton Allante Taylor (born October 5, 1994) is an American professional basketball player for Valencia Basket of the Liga ACB and the EuroLeague. He played college basketball for the Seton Hill Griffins. Standing at 6 feet 6 inches (1.98 m), Taylor plays the small forward position.

== Early life ==
He was born in Hyattsville, Maryland, and his hometown is Landover, Maryland. He is 6 ft 6 in (198 cm), and weighs 200 pounds (91 kg).

== High school ==
In high school, Taylor played for DeMatha Catholic High School in Hyattsville. In his senior season in 2010–11, he averaged 12 points, 8 rebounds, and 6 assists. He was All Washington Catholic Athletic Conference honorable mention.

== College career ==
Taylor joined Seton Hill University in Pennsylvania in 2012, where he majored in sociology. He played for the Seton Hill Griffins in NCAA Division II and the Pennsylvania State Athletic Conference (PSAC). In his freshman year in 2012–13 he averaged 7.8 points, 4.8 rebounds, 2.0 assists, and 1.5 steals per game. He shot 41% from the floor and 70% from the free throw line.

In his sophomore year in 2013–14 he averaged 12.6 points, 6.3 rebounds, 2.6 assists, and 2.0 steals per game. He shot 44% from the floor and 78% from the free throw line.

In his junior year in 2014–15 he was a preseason All-PSAC West selection. He averaged 13.2 points and 4.6 rebounds, 2.1 assists, and 1.0 steals per game. He shot 43% from the floor and 71% from the free throw line.

In his senior year in 2015–16, he averaged 20.8 points, 8.7 rebounds, 4.1 assists, and 2.2 steals per game. He shot 49.6% from the floor, and 76.8% from the line. He was named National Association of Basketball Coaches All-District Second Team and First Team All-PSAC West. He graduated in the spring of 2016.

== Professional career ==
In 2016, after not being drafted by the any NBA team, Taylor signed with Ehingen Urspring in the ProA, the second German division. In 2016–17 for them he averaged 10.8 points, 3.9 rebounds, 2.3 assists, and 1.3 steals per game, while shooting 50.0% from the floor, 43.9% from three point range, and 80.2% from the line. In 2017 Taylor signed with Dragons Rhöndorf in the ProB, the third German division. In 2017–18 for them he averaged 23.4 points (leading the league), 7.9 rebounds, 5.6 assists (5th), and 2.6 steals (2nd) per game.

In March 2018 Taylor signed with s.Oliver Würzburg in the German Basketball Bundesliga (BBL), the country's highest level, with whom he played eight games. Then in 2018, Taylor joined Hungarian basketball team PVSK Panthers in the NB I/A, the highest level league in Hungary, averaging 19.2 points (5th in the league), 8.1 rebounds, 3.9 rebounds, and 2.2 steals (tops in the division) per game. In 2019 he then played for Brose Bamberg of the BBL and the Basketball Champions League, averaging 9.5 points and 3.8 rebounds in 12 games. Later in 2019 Taylor joined Hamburg Towers. In 2020–21 with Hamburg, as an off-guard and point forward he averaged 14.3 points, 5.3 rebounds, 3.4 assists, and 1.5 steals (5th in the league) per game.

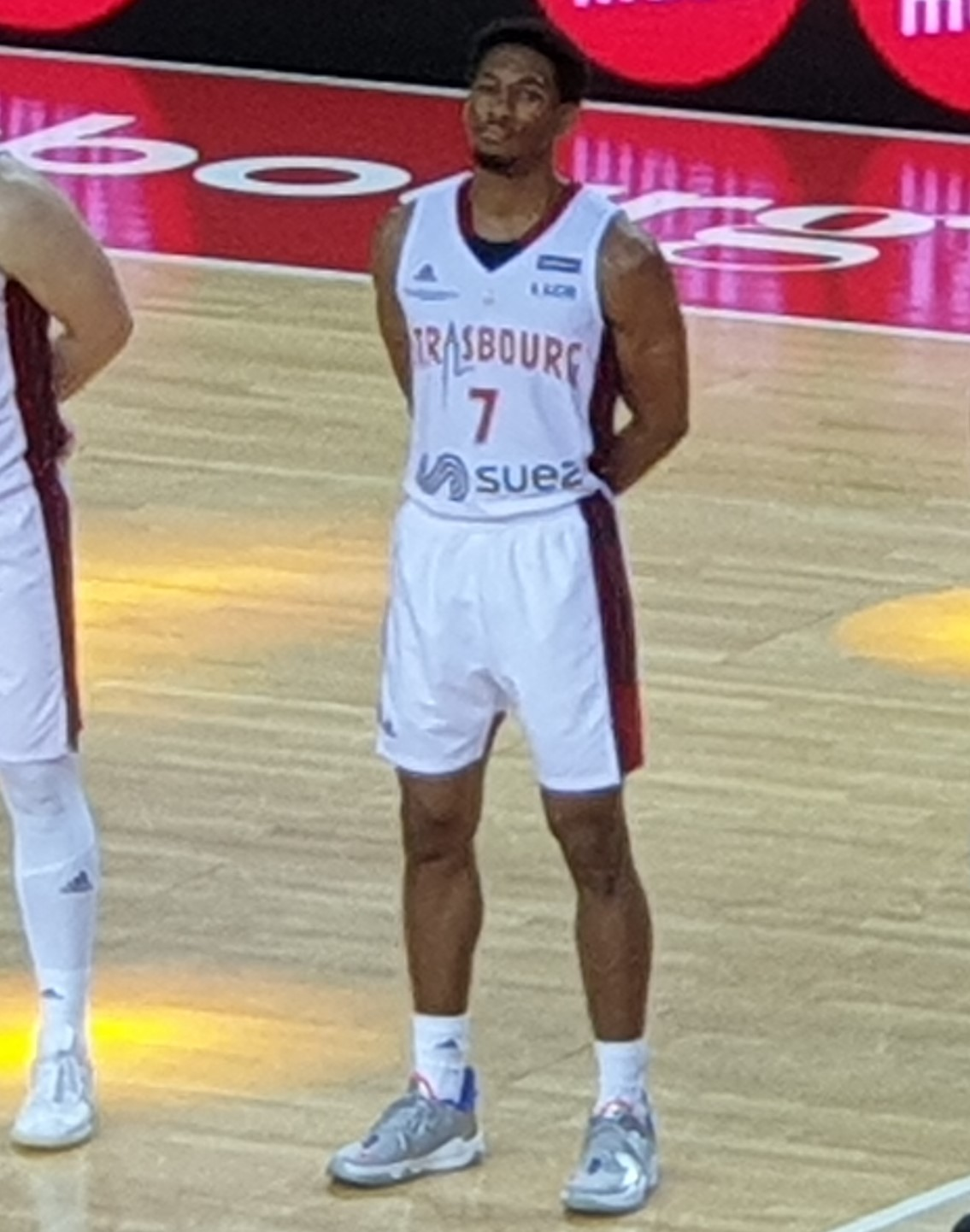
Taylor with Strasbourg in February 2022

In July 2021, Kameron signed a one-year contract with an option for a second season with Israeli Euroleague and Israeli Basketball Premier League team Maccabi Tel Aviv. He plays the shooting guard and small forward positions for the team, and is known for his defense. On January 26, 2022, he was loaned to SIG Strasbourg of the LNB Pro A until end of the season.

On July 21, 2022, he has signed with Bàsquet Girona of the Liga ACB.

On July 14, 2023, he signed with Unicaja of the Spanish Liga ACB.

On June 27, 2025, he signed with Valencia after being bought out of his contract with Unicaja. He then signed a two-year contract with the team.
