= 2005 Supercopa de España de Baloncesto =

The Supercopa de Baloncesto 2005 was disputed in Granada, Andalusia and begins with the following semifinals.

== Semifinals ==
October 8, 2005:

Real Madrid 69 - 74 TAU Cerámica : (Official Match Recap)

Unicaja 71 - 73 CB Granada : (Official Match Recap)

== Third and fourth place ==
October 9, 2005:

Real Madrid 81 - 74 Unicaja: (Official Match Recap)

== Final ==
October 9, 2005:

TAU Cerámica 61 - 55 CB Granada: (Official Match Recap)

MVP: Luis Scola of TAU Cerámica

Supercopa de España 2005
Champions
TAU Cerámica
First title

== See also ==
- Supercopa de España de Baloncesto
- ACB
