= Emir Sulejmanović =

Bosnian-Finnish basketball player

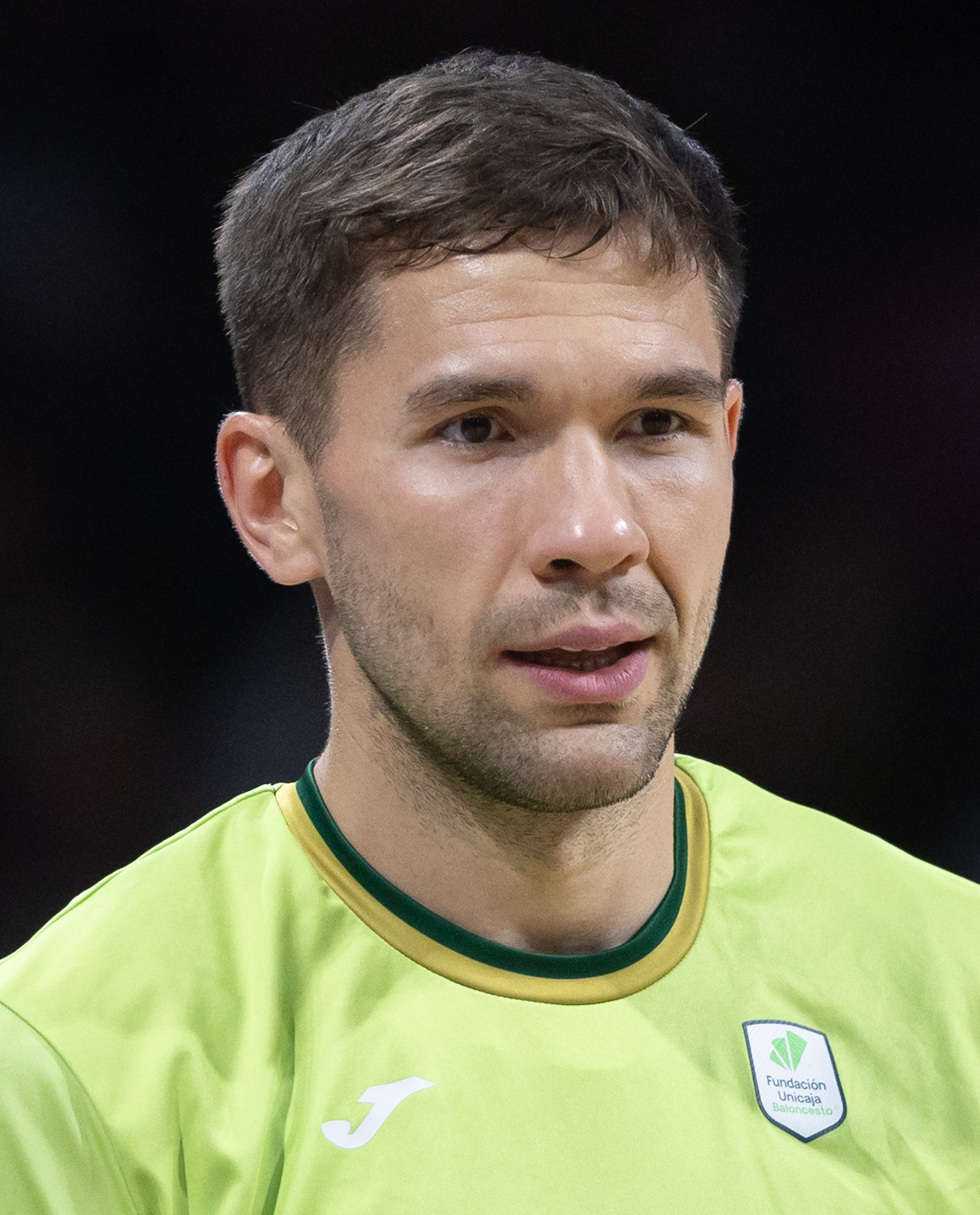
- Sulejmanović with Unicaja in 2026

No. 19 – Joventut Badalona
- Position: Power forward
- League: Liga ACB

Personal information
- Born: July 13, 1995 (age 31) Srebrenica, Bosnia and Herzegovina
- Listed height: 6 ft 9 in (2.06 m)
- Listed weight: 245 lb (111 kg)

Career information
- NBA draft: 2017: undrafted
- Playing career: 2012–present

Career history
- 2011–2013: Union Olimpija
- 2011–2012: →Union Olimpija mladi
- 2013–2016: Barcelona
- 2013–2016: →Barcelona B
- 2015: →Orlandina
- 2016–2017: Cibona
- 2017–2019: Fuenlabrada
- 2017–2019: →Breogán
- 2019–2020: Bilbao
- 2020–2022: Canarias
- 2022–2023: Bilbao
- 2023–2025: Zaragoza
- 2025–2026: Unicaja
- 2026–present: Joventut

Career highlights
- FIBA Champions League champion (2022); FIBA Intercontinental Cup champion (2025); Spanish Supercup winner (2026); Slovenian Cup (2013)

Emir Sulejmanović (born July 13, 1995) is a Bosnian-Finnish professional basketball player for Joventut Badalona of the Spanish Liga ACB.

== Professional career ==
=== Club career ===
Sulejmanović was born in Srebrenica, Bosnia and Herzegovina, but migrated with his family to Jyväskylä, Finland in 1997. The family finally settled in Kaarina in 2000, where Sulejmanović grew up playing junior basketball for the Ura Basket team. In 2011 he transferred to the junior academy of KK Union Olimpija, signing a four-year contract as he made the full squad one year later. He participated in the EuroLeague for the first time against Real Madrid Baloncesto in December 2012.

In July 2013, Sulejmanović moved to FC Barcelona Bàsquet. During the next two years he mostly played with the FC Barcelona B reserve squad. In April 2015, he was loaned to Italian team Orlandina Basket for the rest of the season.

On August 4, 2016, Sulejmanović signed with Croatian club Cibona.

On August 14, 2017, Sulejmanović signed a two-year deal with Spanish club Fuenlabrada. On October 11, 2017, he was loaned to Cafés Candelas Breogán of the LEB Oro. On July 18, 2018, he was loaned to Cafés Candelas Breogán. On August 16, 2019, Sulejmanović signed a two-year deal with Spanish club RETAbet Bilbao Basket. He averaged 6 points and 5 rebounds per game. On July 12, 2020, he parted ways with the team. Sulejmanović signed with CB 1939 Canarias on July 14.

On July 20, 2022, he has signed with Bilbao of the Spanish Liga ACB.

On July 14, 2023, he signed with Casademont Zaragoza of the Liga ACB.

On June 28, 2025, he signed with Unicaja of the Liga ACB.

On July 10, 2026, he signed with Joventut Badalona of the Liga ACB.

== International career ==
Sulejmanović has played for the Finnish U-16 and U-20 junior national teams in the past. He however decided to represent the Bosnia and Herzegovina national team.
