= 2006 Supercopa de España de Baloncesto =

The Supercopa 2006 was disputed in Málaga. The teams that took part in the tournament are:

- Unicaja - Liga ACB champion
- TAU Ceramica - Copa del Rey champion
- Winterthur FCB - 3rd in Liga ACB
- DKV Joventut - 4th in Liga ACB

== Semifinals ==
September 22, 2006:

TAU Cerámica 76 - 52 Winterthur FCB : (Official Match Recap)

Unicaja 74 - 66 DKV Joventut: (Official Match Recap)

== Final ==
September 23, 2006:

Unicaja 78 - 83 TAU Cerámica : (Official Match Recap), (Recap)

MVP: Tiago Splitter of TAU Cerámica

Supercopa de España 2006
Champions
TAU Cerámica
Second title

== See also ==
- Supercopa de España de Baloncesto
- ACB
