= 2008 Supercopa de España de Baloncesto =

The Supercopa 2008 was disputed in the Pabellón Príncipe Felipe, Zaragoza. The teams that took part in the tournament were:

- CAI Zaragoza - host team
- TAU Cerámica - 2007/2008 Liga ACB champions
- DKV Joventut - 2007/2008 Copa del Rey de Baloncesto champions
- Regal FC Barcelona - Runner-up in the ACB League Play-Off 2007/2008

== Semifinals ==
TVE2 (Spain)

September 26
19:00

Report

| TAU Cerámica | 73–70 | Regal FC Barcelona |
Scoring by quarter: 23–14, 20–27, 23–25, 7–4
| Pts: McDonald 21; Rebs: McDonald 8 Asts: Rakočević 4 | | Pts: İlyasova 18; Rebs: İlyasova, Bartoň 6 Asts: Grimau 4 |

Pabellón Principe Felipe, Zaragoza
Attendance: 6,500
Referees: Fco. De La Maza, M.A. Pérez Pérez, Lluis Guirao (Spain)

FORTA, Teledeporte (Spain)

September 26
21:30

Report

| CAI Zaragoza | 96–81 | DKV Joventut |
Scoring by quarter: 27–33, 23–11, 24–17, 22–20
| Pts: Quinteros 21; Rebs: Starosta, Lewis 6 Asts: Victoriano 4 | | Pts: Mallet 18; Rebs: four players 6 Asts: Ribas 4 |

Pabellón Príncipe Felipe, Zaragoza
Attendance: 7,200
Referees: Xavier Amorós, Redondo, José Javier Murgui (Spain)

== Final ==
TVE2 (Spain)

September 27
20:00

Report

| CAI Zaragoza | 85–86 | TAU Cerámica |
Scoring by quarter: 24-27, 11-17, 23-22, 27-20
| Pts: Lewis 19; Rebs: Garcés 6 Asts: Victoriano 5 | | Pts: Prigioni 22; Rebs: four players 4 Asts: Prigioni 3 |

Pabellón Príncipe Felipe, Zaragoza
Attendance: 7,500
Referees: Miguel Ángel Pérez, Juan Luis Redondo, José Javier Murgui (Spain)

Supercopa de España 2008
Champions
TAU Cerámica
Fourth title

== See also ==
- Supercopa de España de Baloncesto
- ACB
