= Supercopa de España de Baloncesto =

Spanish basketball tournament

Supercopa Endesa
- Founded: 2004; 22 years ago
- First season: 2004
- Country: Spain
- Confederation: FIBA Europe
- Number of teams: 4
- Current champions: Joventut (1st title) (2026)
- Most championships: Real Madrid (9 titles)
- TV partners: DAZN
- Website: ACB.COM
- 2026 edition

The Supercopa de España de Baloncesto (English: Spanish Basketball Supercup) is a Spanish annual men's professional basketball competition. The competition is a super cup tournament.

== History ==
The Supercopa was created in 1984 by the recently established Asociación de Clubs de Baloncesto (ACB) in which the league winner faces the cup winner in a single-game final. During its first four editions (1984–1987), the Supercup was also known as Federation Cup, as the tournament was jointly organized by the Spanish Basketball Federation (FEB), and it was held in the middle of the regular season. In 1988–89 season, the Supercup was not played for lack of competitive interest, and finally it was officially cancelled at the beginning of the 1989–90 season.

In 2004, almost two decades after its demise, ACB restored this classic tournament and renamed it Supercopa ACB (since 2011 known as Supercopa Endesa for sponsoring reasons). In order to achieve a higher competitive status, it was moved to the ACB pre-season and turned into a typical Final Four stage, including both the League and Cup winners from the previous season, the host team and the best qualified Spanish club in European competitions.

== Format ==
Since 2004, four teams join the competition, played with a Final Four format the week before the start of the ACB season. During the Supercopa, a three-point shootout is also played between ACB players and, sometimes, players of the Spanish women's league or amateur players.

=== Selection criteria ===
Teams that take part in this competition are:

1. Host team
2. Liga ACB champion
3. Copa del Rey champion
4. Supercopa de España champion
5. If vacancies exist, they will be awarded in the following order:
  1. Liga ACB runner-up
  2. Liga ACB third-placed team
6. If a vacant continues existing, the best qualified at Liga ACB will get the spot.

== Predecessors of Supercopa ACB ==
Year	Season	Host	Arena	Champion	Runner-up	Score
1984	1984–85	L'Alcora	Polideportivo Municipal	Real Madrid	CAI Zaragoza	101–61
1985	1985–86	Valladolid	Polideportivo Pisuerga	Ron Negrita Joventut	Real Madrid	104–91
1986	1986–87	A Coruña	Riazor	Ron Negrita Joventut (2)	Real Madrid	74–67
1987	1987–88	Vigo	Polideportivo Municipal	FC Barcelona	RAM Joventut	91–88

== Finals by year ==
Year	Host	Arena	Champion	Runner-up	Score
2004	Málaga	Martín Carpena	FC Barcelona	Real Madrid	76–75
2005	Granada	Palacio de Deportes	TAU Cerámica	CB Granada	61–55
2006	Málaga	Martín Carpena	TAU Cerámica (2)	Unicaja	83–78
2007	Bilbao	Bizkaia Arena	TAU Cerámica (3)	iurbentia Bilbao Basket	85–73
2008	Zaragoza	Pabellón Príncipe Felipe	TAU Cerámica (4)	CAI Zaragoza	86–85
2009	Las Palmas	Centro Insular de Deportes	Regal FC Barcelona (2)	Real Madrid	86–82
2010	Vitoria-Gasteiz	Buesa Arena	Regal FC Barcelona (3)	Power Electronics Valencia	83–63
2011	Bilbao	Bilbao Arena	FC Barcelona Regal (4)	Caja Laboral	82–73
2012	Zaragoza	Pabellón Príncipe Felipe	Real Madrid	FC Barcelona Regal	95–84
2013	Vitoria-Gasteiz	Buesa Arena	Real Madrid (2)	FC Barcelona	83–79
2014	Vitoria-Gasteiz	Buesa Arena	Real Madrid (3)	FC Barcelona	99–78
2015	Málaga	Martín Carpena	FC Barcelona Lassa (5)	Unicaja	80–62
2016	Vitoria-Gasteiz	Buesa Arena	Herbalife Gran Canaria	FC Barcelona Lassa	79–59
2017	Las Palmas	Gran Canaria Arena	Valencia Basket	Herbalife Gran Canaria	69–63
2018	Santiago de Compostela	Fontes do Sar	Real Madrid (4)	Kirolbet Baskonia	80–73
2019	Madrid	WiZink Center	Real Madrid (5)	FC Barcelona	89–79
2020	La Laguna	Santiago Martín	Real Madrid (6)	FC Barcelona	72–67
2021	La Laguna	Santiago Martín	Real Madrid (7)	FC Barcelona	88–83
2022	Seville	San Pablo	Real Madrid (8)	FC Barcelona	89–83
2023	Murcia	Palacio de Deportes	Real Madrid (9)	Unicaja	88–81
2024	Murcia	Palacio de Deportes	Unicaja	Real Madrid	90–80
2025	Málaga	Martín Carpena	Valencia Basket (2)	Real Madrid	98–94
2026	Badalona	Olímpic Badalona	Joventut	FC Barcelona	101–87

== Titles by team in Supercopa ACB ==
Team	Winner	Runner-up	Semifinalist	Years won	Years runner-up	Years semifinalist
Real Madrid	9	4	7	2012, 2013, 2014, 2018, 2019, 2020, 2021, 2022, 2023	2004, 2009, 2024, 2025	2005, 2007, 2010, 2011, 2015, 2016, 2017
Barcelona	5	9	6	2004, 2009, 2010, 2011, 2015	2012, 2013, 2014, 2016, 2019, 2020, 2021, 2022, 2026	2006, 2007, 2008, 2018, 2023, 2024
Baskonia	4	2	8	2005, 2006, 2007, 2008	2011, 2018	2004, 2009, 2010, 2013, 2014, 2016, 2020, 2026
Valencia	2	1	5	2017, 2025	2010	2012, 2014, 2019, 2021, 2026
Unicaja	1	3	4	2024	2006, 2015, 2023	2004, 2005, 2017, 2025
Gran Canaria	1	1	2	2016	2017	2009, 2015
Joventut	1	–	3	2026	–	2006, 2008, 2022
Bilbao	–	1	2	–	2007	2011, 2013
Basket Zaragoza	–	1	1	–	2008	2012
Granada	–	1	–	–	2005	–
Canarias	–	–	3	–	–	2020, 2021, 2025
UCAM Murcia	–	–	2	–	–	2023, 2024
Obradoiro	–	–	1	–	–	2018
Fuenlabrada	–	–	1	–	–	2019
Real Betis	–	–	1	–	–	2022

== Titles by team in predecessors of Supercopa ACB ==
Team	Winner	Runner-up	Seasons won	Seasons runner-up
Joventut	2	1	1985–86, 1986–87	1987–88
Real Madrid	1	2	1984–85	1985–86, 1986–87
Barcelona	1	–	1987–88	–
CB Zaragoza	–	1	–	1984–85

== Awards ==
=== MVP ===
==== Winners by year ====
Year	Player	Team
2004	(Serbia and Montenegro) Dejan Bodiroga	FC Barcelona
2005	(Argentina) Luis Scola	TAU Cerámica
2006	(Brazil) Tiago Splitter	TAU Cerámica
2007	(Brazil) Tiago Splitter (2)	TAU Cerámica
2008	(Argentina) Pablo Prigioni	TAU Cerámica
2009	(Spain) Juan Carlos Navarro	Regal FC Barcelona
2010	(Spain) Juan Carlos Navarro (2)	Regal FC Barcelona
2011	(Spain) Juan Carlos Navarro (3)	FC Barcelona Regal
2012	(Spain) Rudy Fernández	Real Madrid
2013	(Spain) Sergio Rodríguez	Real Madrid
2014	(Spain) Sergio Llull	Real Madrid
2015	(Spain) Pau Ribas	FC Barcelona Lassa
2016	(United States) Kyle Kuric	Herbalife Gran Canaria
2017	(United States) Erick Green	Valencia Basket
2018	(Spain) Sergio Llull (2)	Real Madrid
2019	(Argentina) Facundo Campazzo	Real Madrid
2020	(Argentina) Facundo Campazzo (2)	Real Madrid
2021	(Spain) Sergio Llull (3)	Real Madrid
2022	(Cape Verde) Edy Tavares	Real Madrid
2023	(Argentina) Facundo Campazzo (3)	Real Madrid
2024	(United States) Kameron Taylor	Unicaja
2025	(Spain) Sergio de Larrea	Valencia Basket
2026	(Argentina) Nicolás Laprovittola	Asisa Joventut
