= Bizkaia Arena =

Indoor arena in Barakaldo, Greater Bilbao

- Pavilion 4
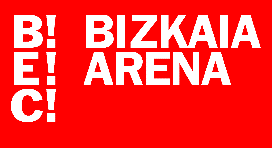

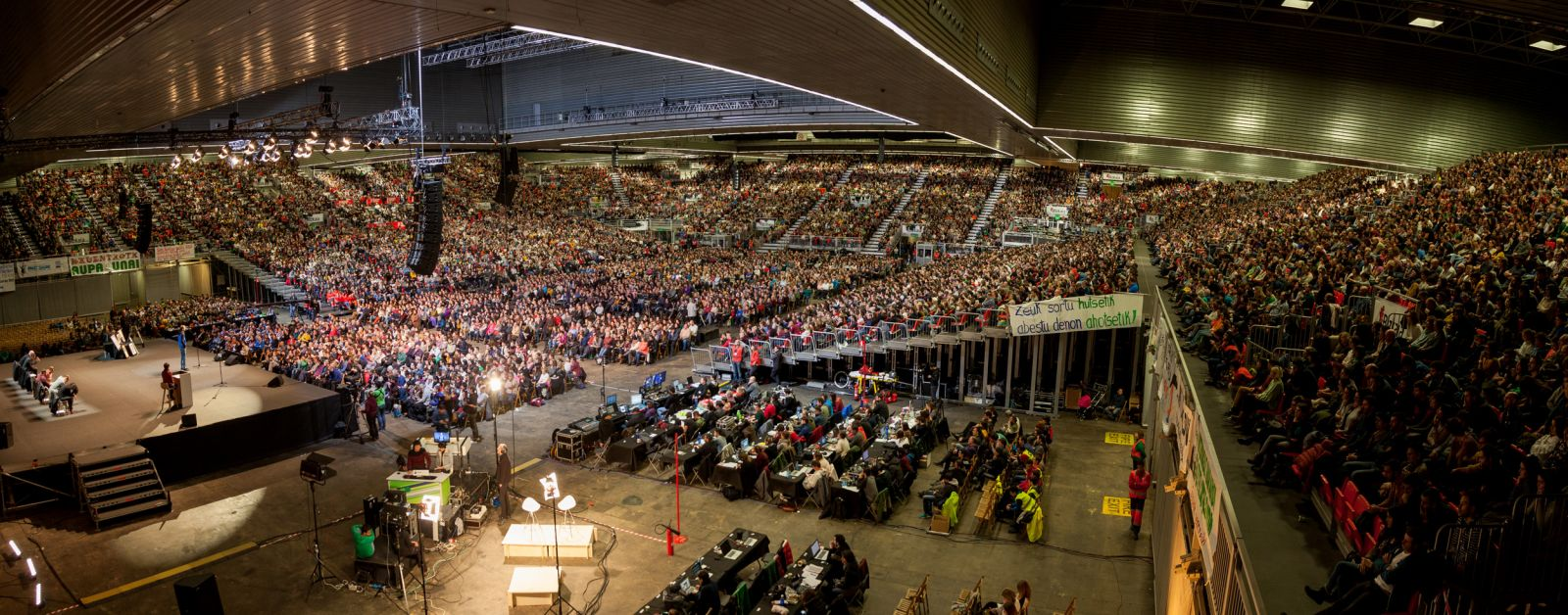
- Great Bertsolari Championship in 2017
- Interactive map of Bizkaia Arena
- Location: Ronda de Azkue Nr. 1, 48902 Barakaldo, Biscay, Spain
- Coordinates: 43°17′17.65″N 2°59′26.64″W
- Operator: Bilbao Exhibition Centre
- Capacity: Bizkaia Arena; 26 000 (maximum legal capacity); 21 500 (maximum concert capacity); 18 640 (180° concerts); 15 414 (basketball); Sala CUBEC! 5 500 (maximum); 3 000 (minimum)
- Record attendance: 15,483 (Ukraine vs United States, 4 September 2014)

Construction
- Opened: November 2004
- Architect: ACXT

Tenant
- Bizkaia Bilbao Basket (2009–2010)

Website
- https://bizkaiaarena.bilbaoexhibitioncentre.com/en/bizkaia-arena/

Bizkaia Arena is an indoor arena in Barakaldo, Greater Bilbao. It is one of the biggest multipurpose halls in Spain, as it can hold up to 26,000 people with maximum legal capacity, although in most concert configurations the capacity is reduced to 18,640. It can also be exceptionally expanded to 21,500 (combining the maximum capacity of the bleachers and stands with the stage), and for basketball the maximum capacity is 15,414 people. The arena is part of the Bilbao Exhibition Centre (BEC) complex, the Exhibition and Congress Centre of Bilbao and Biscay, inaugurated in April 2004. It is situated in the Pavilion 4.

The venue regularly hosts basketball games, for which it has a capacity of 15,414. It was one of the six venues used for the 2014 FIBA Basketball World Cup, hosted by Spain. The arena hosted the annual MTV Europe Music Awards in 2018 as the awards show was held in Spain for the third time and the first time in Bilbao.

== Description and technical data ==
The Bizkaia Arena has a perimeter of 22,000 m², measuring 125 x 175 meters.

As for the court, it has a variable width from 29 meters to 60 meters, a surface area from 2,300 m² to 4,700 m², and a depth of 79 meters.

The bleachers are with 11,500 seats, expandable by 3,500 and the court with capacity of 10,000 standing spectators.

The ceiling height varies, ranging from a minimum of 11.5 meters to 18.3 meters.

The venue has six dressing rooms, with the possibility of adding more in the adjacent pavilions.

- Two dressing rooms (C1-C6) of 82 m² each
- Two dressing rooms (C2-C5) of 77 m² each
- Two VIP dressing rooms (C3-C4) of 28 m² each

In addition, the concert configuration includes a 142 m² catering area and dressing rooms for production catering, with a 10-meter bar and temporary storage for equipment. VIP areas can also be installed.

Above the usual stage location is an aerial structure consisting of 18-meter-long bridges, with a maximum load capacity of 2 tons per unit.

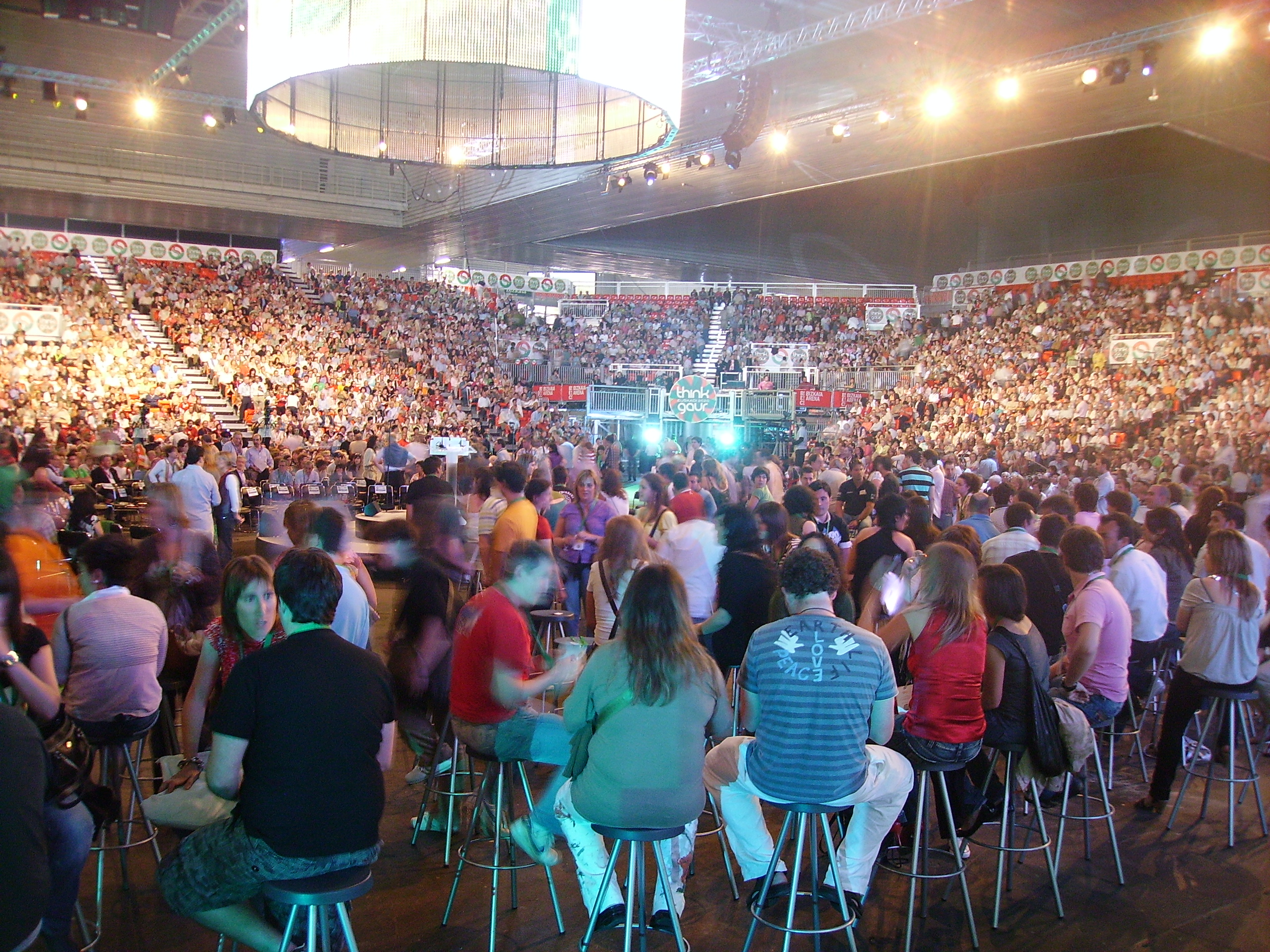
A political event with 15,000 people was held at the Bizkaia Arena.

Finally, there are small rooms that function as offices and two interconnected, independent modules of 37 m² each for event production and setup equipment. Like the BEC, it has an operational helipad.

=== Configurations ===
Being a modular venue, there are numerous configurations: with seating, without seating, with a usable section, etc. The most common are the following:

==== Bizkaia Arena Amphitheater ====
This configuration combines a section of seating with a section of the floor. With careful and well-planned capacity, it creates the atmosphere of a medium-sized venue, like an amphitheater or semicircular seating area. Depending on the floor configuration (seated or standing), capacities of between 4,500 and 6,000 people are achieved. The unused sections are covered with a black tarpaulin that improves acoustics and prevents reverberation.

==== Bizkaia Arena Concerts ====
With this configuration, part of the seating is retractable, allowing the capacity to be configured according to the client's preferences, with more or fewer people in the seating and/or on the floor. In this way, a capacity of 10,000 people can be achieved with the stage positioned halfway across the arena, or a maximum capacity of 18,640 people with the stage at a 180-degree angle. Exceptionally, and depending on the stage configuration, a capacity of 21,500 people is possible.

=== Services ===
The venue has ticket offices outside, multiple cloakrooms inside the arena near the entrance (free of charge for promoters), bars, catering and a restaurant services. It also has parking for 4,400 vehicles, a and private security.

For truck access, trailers can drive right up to the front of the stage through two gates (4.6 and 4.7), each 6 meters wide and with a turning radius of over 15 meters. The entire access road is smooth, well-paved, and free of obstacles for maneuvering. The arena can accommodate the simultaneous unloading of up to 15 trailers. In addition, there are eight more identical gates around the perimeter of the pavilion to access other potential areas (emergency services, merchandise unloading, etc.).

== History ==
The arena was used as the home arena of the Spanish League basketball club Bilbao Basket during the 2009-10 season. In other seasons, it has also occasionally been used for their most attractive games. It hosted the 2010 Spanish King's Cup Final Eight.

The arena hosted a preseason game between Bilbao Basket and the NBA team the Philadelphia 76ers. Several international pop and rock acts have also performed at the Bizkaia Arena.

The venue has also been used for other kinds of shows, such as opera, Disney on Ice, etc., political speeches, and religious meetings.

== Concerts ==
Concerts held at Bizkaia Arena
| Year | Date | Nationality | Artist(s) | Tour |
|---|---|---|---|---|
| 2005 | 17 June | United States | Lenny Kravitz | Electric Church Tour |
| 2006 | 24 October | United Kingdom | Muse | Black Holes and Revelations |
| 2007 | 29 January | United States | Chuck Berry | |
| 2007 | 3 May | Mexico | Luis Miguel | México En La Piel Tour |
| 2009 | 17 September | Canada | Leonard Cohen | 2009 Tour |
| 2009 | 10 November | United States | Jonas Brothers | Jonas Brothers World Tour 2009 |
| 2009 | 14 November | Germany | Rammstein | Liebe Ist Für Alle Da Tour |
| 2010 | 8 November | Basque | Berri Txarrak | |
| 2011 | 17 September | Mexico | Maná | Drama y Luz Tour |
| 2011 | 24 September | United Kingdom | George Michael | Symphonica Tour |
| 2013 | 19 April | Germany | Rammstein | Made in Germany 1995–2011 |
| 2013 | 26 May | Barbados | Rihanna | Diamonds World Tour |
| 2014 | 29 May | United Kingdom | Iron Maiden | Maiden England Tour |
| 2014 | 19 July | France | David Guetta | Guetta Live |
| 2014 | 20 September | Spain | Extremoduro | Para Todos los Públicos |
| 2014 | 2 November | United Kingdom | Elton John | Follow the Yellow Brick Road Tour |
| 2014 | 13 December | Spain | Fito & Fitipaldis | Huyendo Conmigo de Mí |
| 2015 | 14 March | Spain | Joaquín Sabina | 500 Noches Para 1 Crisis |
| 2015 | 10 April | United States | Romeo Santos | Vol. 2 World Tour |
| 2015 | 1 May | Spain | Vetusta Morla | La Deriva Tour |
| 2015 | 9 September | Mexico | Maná | Cama Incendiada Tour |
| 2015 | 4 October | United States | Rise Against | 2015 Tour |
| 2015 | 24 October | Spain | Fito & Fitipaldis | Huyendo Conmigo de Mí |
| 2016 | 29 January | Canada | Bryan Adams | Get Up Tour |
| 2016 | 16 February | Italy | Eros Ramazzotti | Perfetto World Tour |
| 2016 | 8 June | Various | Il Divo | Amor & Pasión Tour |
| 2016 | 14 October | Argentina | God Save the Queen | Forever World Tour |
| 2016 | 15 October | Spain | El Barrio | |
| 2016 | 17 November | United States | Paul Simon | Live in Concert |
| 2016 | 24 November | United Kingdom | The Twilight Sad | Nobody Wants to be Here |
| 2016 | 29 November | Basque | La Oreja de Van Gogh | |
| 2017 | 25 March | Spain | Juan Magán | En Concierto |
| 2017 | 31 March | Colombia | Carlos Vives | La Fiesta de Todos Tour |
| 2017 | 29 April | United States | Dream Theater | Images, Words & Beyond |
| 2017 | 11 June | Puerto Rico | Ricky Martin | One World Tour |
| 2017 | 30 June | United Kingdom | Deep Purple | The Long Goodbye Tour |
| 2017 | 13 September | Colombia | Maluma | Maluma World Tour |
| 2017 | 7 October | Spain | Joaquín Sabina | Lo Niego Todo |
| 2017 | 8 October | Spain | Joaquín Sabina | Lo Niego Todo |
| 2017 | 4 November | Spain | Kase.O | Gira el Círculo |
| 2018 | 9 January | Mexico | Soy Luna | Soy Luna Live |
| 2018 | 17 March | Basque | Berri Txarrak | Infra Tour |
| 2018 | 14 April | United States | Thirty Seconds to Mars | The Monolith Tour |
| 2018 | 4 May | Spain | Fito & Fitipaldis | Gira 20 Aniversario |
| 2018 | 5 May | Spain | Fito & Fitipaldis | Gira 20 Aniversario |
| 2018 | 1 June | Spain | Pablo Alborán | Prometo Tour |
| 2018 | 24 June | Spain | Operación Triunfo | OT 2017 en concierto |
| 2018 | 28 June | United Kingdom | Judas Priest | |
| 2018 | 30 June | Colombia | Shakira | El Dorado World Tour |
| 2018 | 6 October | Spain | Melendi | Ahora Tour |
| 2018 | 20 October | Spain | Dani Martín | Gira Grandes Éxitos |
| 2018 | 16 November | Spain | Loquillo | 40 Años de Rock and Roll |
| 2018 | 17 November | Spain | Malú | Oxígeno Tour |
| 2018 | 2 December | Finland | Nightwish | Decades: World Tour |
| 2018 | 15 December | Spain | Rosendo | Tour 2018 |
| 2018 | 29 December | Lebanon | Ara Malikian | La Increíble Gira de Violín |
| 2019 | 15 March | United States | Twenty One Pilots | The Bandito Tour |
| 2019 | 26 April | United States | Bob Dylan | Never Ending Tour |
| 2019 | 3 May | Spain | Taburete | Ayahuasca Tour |
| 2019 | 4 May | Italy | Ennio Morricone | 60 Years of Music |
| 2019 | 1 June | Spain | Operación Triunfo | OT 2018 en concierto |
| 2019 | 22 June | Spain | Leiva | Nuclear Tour |
| 2019 | 5 October | Puerto Rico | Anuel AA | Real Hasta la Muerte Tour |
| 2019 | 18 October | Basque | La Polla Records | ¡Ni Descanso, Ni Paz! |
| 2019 | 19 October | Basque | La Polla Records | ¡Ni Descanso, Ni Paz! |
| 2019 | 23 November | Spain | Amaral | Salto al Color Tour |
| 2019 | 1 December | Germany | Hans Zimmer | The World of Hans Zimmer |
| 2019 | 10 December | Canada | Bryan Adams | Shine a Light Tour |
| 2019 | 21 December | Spain | Melendi | Mi Cubo de Rubik Tour |
| 2019 | 28 December | Basque | Marea | El Azogue |
| 2020 | 24 October | Spain | Triángulo de Amor Bizarro | |
| 2021 | 22 May | Spain | M Clan | En Acústico |
| 2021 | 5 June | Spain | Derby Motoreta's Burrito Kachimba | Tour 2021 |
| 2021 | 3 September | Puerto Rico | Myke Towers | Myke Towers World Tour |
| 2021 | 11 October | Puerto Rico | Rauw Alejandro | Rauw Alejandro World Tour |
| 2021 | 16 October | United States | Justin Quiles | 2021 Tour |
| 2021 | 27 November | Basque | Gatibu | 20 Years Tour |
| 2021 | 11 December | Spain | Dani Martín | Qué Caro Es El Tiempo |
| 2021 | 18 December | Spain | Beret | Prisma Tour |
| 2022 | 9 April | Spain | C. Tangana | Sin Cantar Ni Afinar Tour |
| 2022 | 7 May | Spain | Estopa | Fuego Tour |
| 2022 | 13 May | United States | Bad Religion | European Tour |
| 2022 | 7 July | Dominican | Juan Luis Guerra | Entre Mar y Palmeras Tour |
| 2022 | 16 July | Spain | Alejandro Sanz | Sanz en Vivo |
| 2022 | 23 July | Colombia | Camilo | De Adentro Pa Afuera Tour |
| 2022 | 27 July | Spain | Rosalía | Motomami World Tour |
| 2022 | 10 September | Spain | Aitana | 11 Razones Tour |
| 2022 | 23 September | United States | Becky G | Ni Mala Ni Santa Tour |
| 2022 | 11 November | Denmark | Volbeat | Servant of the Road Tour |
| 2022 | 2 December | Spain | Rigoberta Bandini | Rigotour |
| 2022 | 16 December | Basque | Hertzainak | Jaio Eta Bukatu |
| 2022 | 17 December | Basque | Hertzainak | Jaio Eta Bukatu |
| 2023 | 2 March | United Kingdom | Queen Extravaganza | 2023 Tour |
| 2023 | 11 May | Germany | Hans Zimmer | Hans Zimmer Live |
| 2023 | 23 June | Spain | Joaquín Sabina | Contra Todo Pronóstico Tour |
| 2023 | 25 June | Spain | Joaquín Sabina | Contra Todo Pronóstico Tour |
| 2023 | 22 July | United Kingdom | Iron Maiden | The Future Past World Tour |
| 2023 | 2 September | Puerto Rico | Rauw Alejandro | Saturno World Tour |
| 2023 | 7 October | Spain | Quevedo | DQE Tour |
| 2023 | 1 November | Spain | Aitana | Alpha Tour |
| 2023 | 10 November | Spain | Melendi | 20 Años Sin Noticias |
| 2023 | 18 November | Spain / Morocco | Morad | Morad Euro Tour |
| 2023 | 25 November | Basque | Marea | Tour 2023 |
| 2023 | 15 December | Spain | Melendi | 20 Años Sin Noticias |
| 2024 | 21 March | United Kingdom | Depeche Mode | Memento Mori World Tour |
| 2024 | 27 April | Spain | Operación Triunfo | OT 2023 en concierto |
| 2024 | 30 April | Spain | Saiko | Sakura Tour |
| 2024 | 11 May | Spain | Estopa | Gira 25 Aniversario |
| 2024 | 29 June | Mexico | Maná | México Lindo y Querido |
| 2024 | 28 September | Spain | Ana Mena | Bellodrama Tour |
| 2024 | 5 October | Spain / Morocco | Morad | Tour 2024/2025 |
| 2024 | 15 November | Canada | Bryan Adams | So Happy It Hurts Tour |
| 2025 | 15, 21 and 22 March | Basque | En Tol Sarmiento | 20 urte zure eskutik |
| 2025 | 28 March | Basque | Chill Mafia | Agur eta ohore |
| 2025 | 29 March | Spain | Ojete Calor | |
| 2025 | 5 April | Basque | ZEIDFEST | Basque Music Festival |
| 2025 | 11 April | United States / Canada | Queen Extravaganza | Celebrating 50 years of Bohemian Rhampsody |
| 2025 | 9 May | United States | Bad Religion | Bad Religion 45 years |
| 2025 | 10 May | Spain | Un1ted Festival | Un1ted Festival (I) |
| 2025 | 31 May | Basque | Izaro | |
| 2025 | 6 June | Spain | Rigoberta Bandini | Tour 2025 |
| 2025 | 7 June | Puerto Rico | Myke Towers | European Tour 2025 |
| 2025 | 14 June | Spain | Leiva | Tour Gigante |
| 2025 | 27 June | United States | Marc Anthony | Marc Anthony En Vivo |
| 2025 | 16 July | United States | Jennifer Lopez | Up All Night Live |
| 2025 | 4 September | Spain | Quevedo | Buenas Noches Tour España |
| 2025 | 4 October | Spain | Blackworks Festival | Techno music festival |
| 2025 | 10 October | Spain | Loquillo | Corazones Legendarios |
| 2025 | 17 October | Spain | Trend Festival XXL: Hard GZ, Kidd Keo and Arce | Music Festival |
| 2025 | 24 October | Basque | Ura Bere Bidean | Basque Music Festival |
| 2025 | 25 October | Basque | Ura Bere Bidean | Basque Music Festival |
| 2025 | 28 October | Denmark | Volbeat | Greatest of all Tours |
| 2025 | 5 November | Spain | Joaquín Sabina | Hola y adiós |
| 2025 | 7 November | Spain | Joaquín Sabina | Hola y adiós |
| 2025 | 8 November | Spain | Lágrimas de Sangre | Gira despedida |
| 2025 | 15 November | Spain | Remember Paradise Festival | 8º Aniversario Remember Paradise. Destino Final. |
| 2025 | 29 November | Spain | Love the 90's Music Festival | 90's music festival |
| 2025 | 6 December | Basque | Gatibu | Agur esan barik |
| 2025 | 12 December | Basque | Gatibu | Agur esan barik |
| 2025 | 13 December | Basque | Gatibu | Agur esan barik |
| 2025 | 19 December | Puerto Rico | Gilberto Santa Rosa | Navidades con Gilberto Santa Rosa |
| 2025 | 20 December | Spain | Un1ted Festival | Un1ted Festival (II) |
| 2025 | 27 December | Spain | Megasalseo | Music Festival |
| 2026 | 9 January | Spain | Fito & Fitipaldis | Aullidos Tour |
| 2026 | 10 January | Spain | Fito & Fitipaldis | Aullidos Tour |
| 2026 | 18 April | Spain | Operación Triunfo | OT 2025 |
| 2026 | 25 April | Spain | Trend Festival XXL: Yung Beef and Kaydy Cain | Music Festival |
| 2026 | 3 May | Spain | Amaia | Gira Arenas |
| 2026 | 9 May | Spain | La Oreja de Van Gogh | Tantas Cosas Que Contar Tour |
| 2026 | 10 May | Spain | La Oreja de Van Gogh | Tantas Cosas Que Contar Tour |
| 2026 | 15 May | Spain | Fito & Fitipaldis | Aullidos Tour |
| 2026 | 16 May | Spain | Fito & Fitipaldis | Aullidos Tour |
| 2026 | 22 May | Spain | Los Delinqüentes | 25 años del sentimiento garrapatero que nos traen las flores |
| 2026 | 29 May | United States | Megadeth | The Farewell Tour |
| 2026 | 30 May | Spain | El Último de la Fila | Gira 2026 |
| 2026 | 5 June | Spain | El Último de la Fila | Gira 2026 |
| 2026 | 14 June | Spain | Alejandro Sanz | ¿Y ahora qué? |
| 2026 | 15 July | Colombia | Beéle | Detone y Abandone Tour |
| 2026 | 18 September | Spain | Aitana | Cuarto Azul World Tour |
| 2026 | 19 September | Spain | Aitana | Cuarto Azul World Tour |
| 2026 | 2 October | Spain | Dani Martín | Gira 25 p*t*s años |
| 2026 | 3 October | Spain | Dani Martín | Gira 25 p*t*s años |
| 2026 | 17 October | Spain | Melendi | Pop Rock Tour |
| 2026 | 18 October | Spain | Melendi | Pop Rock Tour |
| 2026 | 22 October | Basque | Ura Bere Bidean 26 | Basque music festival |
| 2026 | 23 October | Basque | Ura Bere Bidean 26 | Basque music festival |
| 2026 | 24 October | Basque | Ura Bere Bidean 26 | Basque music festival |
| 2026 | 13 November | Canada | Bryan Adams | Roll with the punches 2026 |
| 2026 | 14 November | Spain | Remember Paradise Festival | 9º Aniversario Remember Paradise. Destino Final. |
| 2026 | 5 December | Spain | La Oreja de Van Gogh | Tantas Cosas Que Contar Tour |
| 2026 | 26 December | Spain | Carolina Durante | Fin de la aventura |
| 2027 | 9 January | Basque | Peio eta Pantxoa | Azken Dantza |
| 2027 | 10 January | Basque | Peio eta Pantxoa | Azken Dantza |
| 2027 | 16 January | Spain | Rodrigo Cuevas | La Belleza |

== Sala CUBEC! ==
The Sala CUBEC! is a multipurpose space integrated within the Bizkaia Arena pavilion, designed for small- to medium-sized events that do not require seating. Its current configuration is the result of an adaptation and optimization process initiated after a pilot test conducted in late 2015 during a concert with an audience of 4,200 people.

The space is located in the central area of the Bizkaia Arena pavilion, a venue typically used for large concerts and shows. The Sala CUBEC! hall is designed to accommodate events with capacities of up to 5,500 people, offering a suitable alternative for smaller productions or concerts.

Its spatial configuration is achieved through the installation of fire-resistant curtains approximately 18 meters high, suspended from the roof to ground level and arranged to conceal the pavilion's seating area. This solution creates a cubic-shaped enclosure that fosters greater proximity between the audience and participants, providing an environment with dimensions tailored to the expected capacity and enhanced acoustics.

The versatility of the Sala CUBEC! allows the space to be adapted to different types of events, including concerts, theatrical performances, audiovisual screenings, and corporate events, through specific configurations based on the needs of each organizing body.

In its standard configuration with a stage, the venue has an approximate area of 1,575 m², corresponding to dimensions of 45 meters wide by 35 meters long. Without the stage, the usable length can reach 79 meters, increasing the available area to 3,555 m².

Above the usual stage location is an aerial structure consisting of three 18-meter-long bridges, with a maximum load capacity of 2 tons per unit.

Its technical facilities include basic sound and lighting equipment that can be expanded according to the needs of each production, two 400-volt three-phase power lines, rigging systems, permanent blackout curtains, a resident stage, and a large outdoor area for production operations and parking for technical vehicles, tour buses, and trailers.

The support infrastructure comprises six dressing rooms located at the back of the stage, equipped with power, network connections, and basic furniture. In the same area are two 37 m² production offices, connected to each other to facilitate operational coordination.

Public access is directly from outside the exhibition center, a short distance from the Ansio metro station. This layout allows operations to be carried out exclusively on the ground floor of the building, without needing to use the main atrium of the BEC (Bilbao Exhibition Centre) or the usual entrances of the Bizkaia Arena, thus optimizing the resources associated with the management and operation of the event, making it more accessible and cost-effective.

== Access and public transport ==
The multipurpose pavilion utilizes the existing infrastructure for the BEC trade fair:

=== Vehicles ===
It has parking for 4,400 vehicles. In addition, the Bizkaia Arena has independent access for up to 15 trailers simultaneously for production operations.

It also has a taxi rank next to the main entrance of the BEC and a bus parking area.

=== Metro ===
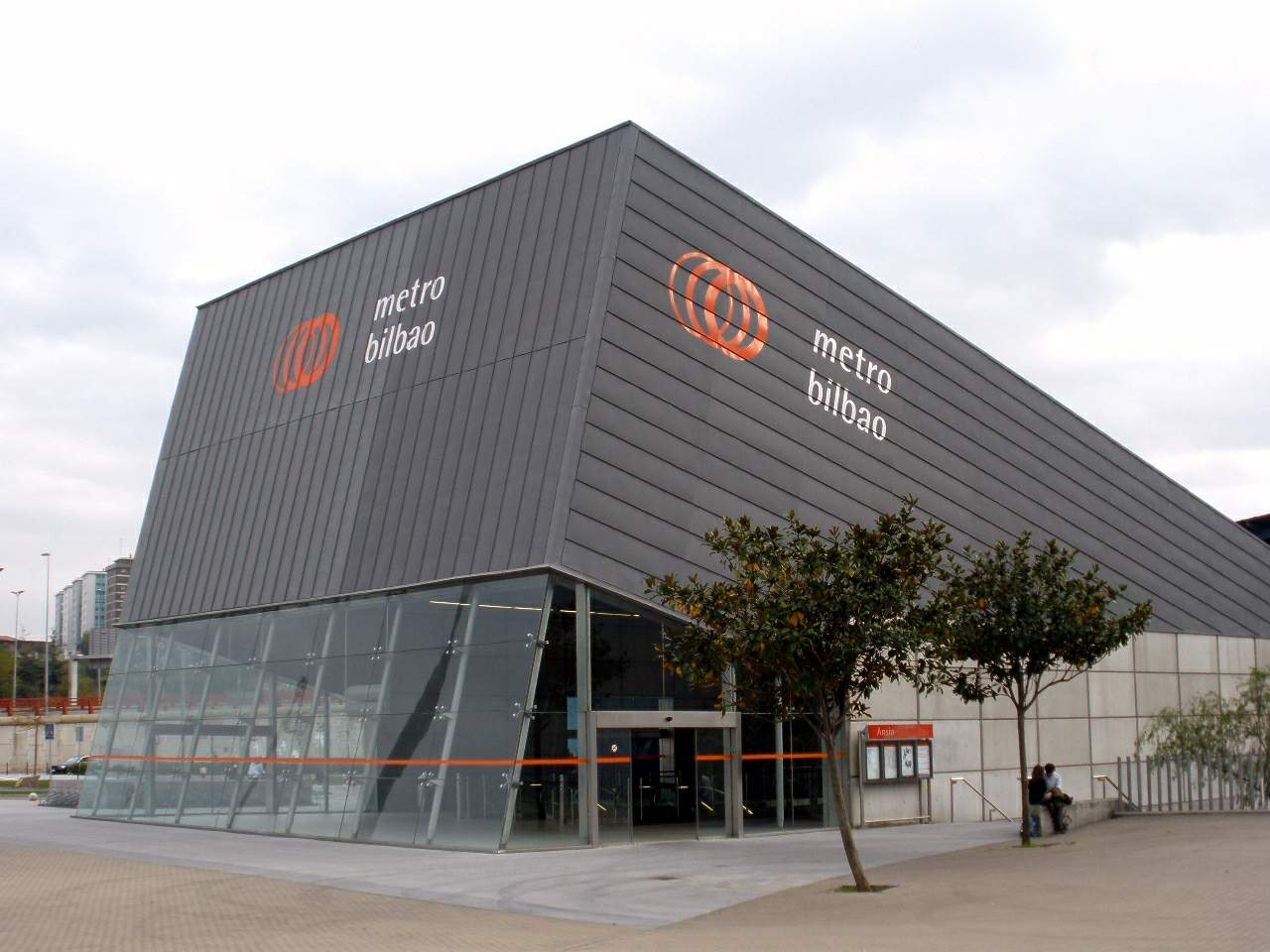
Ansio metro station and the bus terminal

The nearest stations of Bilbao Metro are Ansio (10 meters away) and Barakaldo (800 meters away) that connects to Bilbao: Bilbao Intermodal, San Mamés Stadium, etc...

=== Bus ===
Next to the Ansio Metro station, there is a bus terminal where both the Barakaldo city bus (Kbus) and suburban buses (Bizkaibus) stop. Bizkaibus connects it directly to Bilbao Airport, located in Loiu and some city's, such us Sestao, Bilbao, Portugalete or Getxo.

=== Public Bicycle Rental ===
There is a Bizkaibizi station, number 34521 (BEC).

== See also ==
- Bilbao Exhibition Centre
- Bilbao Arena
- List of indoor arenas in Spain
