= Saski Baskonia =

Basketball team in Spain

Baskonia Vitoria-Gasteiz
- Leagues: Liga ACB; EuroLeague
- Founded: 26 December 1959; 66 years ago
- History: List: Club Deportivo Vasconia (1959–1976); Club Deportivo Basconia (1976–1987); Saski-Baskonia S.A.D. (1988–present)
- Arena: Fernando Buesa Arena
- Capacity: 15,504
- Location: Vitoria-Gasteiz, Spain
- Team colors: Red, blue, white
- President: José Antonio Querejeta
- Head coach: Velimir Perasović
- Team captain: Tadas Sedekerskis
- Ownership: José Antonio Querejeta (57.62%)
- Championships: 1 FIBA Saporta Cup; 4 Spanish Championships; 7 Spanish Cups; 4 Spanish Supercups
- Retired numbers: 5 (4, 5, 8, 9, 21)
- Website: baskonia.com
| Home | Away | Third |

Club Deportivo Saski-Baskonia, S.A.D commonly known as Saski Baskonia (pronounced [s̺as̺ki bas̺konia]) and also simply as Baskonia, is a professional basketball team based in Vitoria-Gasteiz, Spain. The team plays in the Liga ACB and the EuroLeague.

== History ==
=== 1959–1969: start in the provincial basketball ===
In 1959, the Club Deportivo Vasconia founded a basketball program under the presidency of Félix Ullivarriarrazua. Vicente Elejalde was appointed as head coach. A previous attempt to establish a basketball program, in 1951, had ended in failure.

In its first season, the team finished second in the provincial championship behind Corazonistas. In the 1963–64 season, the team won its first provincial titles, taking both the league and cup. The team went on to win the provincial championship in five of its first ten seasons of competition (1959–69) and achieved the promotion to the 3rd division after Pepe Laso took over as head coach, prevailing over city rival Deportivo Alavés.

=== 1970–1980: the leap to the Spanish top league ===
Club Deportivo Vasconia was an immediate success in the Spanish 3rd division and was elevated to the 2nd division after beating Grupo Covadonga in the promotion playoffs. In its first season in the 2nd division (1970–71), the team qualified for the promotion playoffs to the 1st division, but was defeated by Breogán. A year later, the team achieved promotion to the 1st division after finishing as the champion of Group A.

The team opened the 1972–73 season in the 1st division by defeating Breogán 89–67. The Basque team went on to reach the semifinals of the Copa del Rey where they were eliminated by Estudiantes. In the 1973–74 season, the club reached 1,400 supporters and signed its first foreign player, the Canadian Phil Tollestrup. The team finished in eighth place and gained the right to play in the Korać Cup but declined to participate on financial grounds.

In 1974, Jose Luis Sánchez Erauskin, former player and founder of the club, took over the club's presidency. The team incorporated young players such as Manu Moreno, Kepa Segurola, Luis María Junguitu, Carlos Salinas, and José Antonio Querejeta, and signed American Ray Price, who became the division's top scorer. Memorable wins in the 1975–76 season included a 70–69 upset of FC Barcelona and a 78–76 road win over Joventut. In 1976–77, Sánchez Erauskin and his board made the decision to change the V by B in the name of the club, which became Club Deportivo Basconia. The team adopted the Basque national colors of the Ikurriña, green with red and white trim instead of the club's traditional blue and maroon. Pepe Laso combined his position as head coach with the Spanish national coach and Iñaki Garaialde and Txema Capetillo joined the team.

In 1977, Juan Antonio Ortiz de Pinedo retired as a player to become the head coach of the team, replacing Pepe Laso. In 1978, José Antonio Querejeta was transferred to Real Madrid. In addition to financial compensation, the club obtained the young player Manuel San Emeterio in return. Iñaki Iriarte became the head coach of the team. Players like Junguitu, and Txomin Sautu returned and Juan Manuel Conde was signed, along with the American Webb Williams. Fernando Aranguiz assumed the presidency of the club in June 1978 and Carlos Luquero was honored for a professional record including more than 300 games and more than 7,000 points with the team. In the Copa del Rey, the team reached the semifinals before falling to that year's winner, FC Barcelona.

In 1979, Peio Cambronero arrived from Estudiantes and the club signed the American Malcolm Cesare, but the results for the 1979–80 season were not good and the team finished the league in a relegation position. Fortunately, the Spanish Federation decided to expand the 1st division to fourteen teams, allowing Club Deportivo Basconia to remain in the league.

=== 1980–1990: in steady progression ===
The reprieve lasted just one year, as the 1980–81 season was one of the saddest in the club's history. A last-place finish and just six wins led to relegation to the 2nd division. The misfortunes did not end there, as one of its players, Juanma Conde, died after an irreversible illness. This was a blow to the entire club, for the loss of a teammate and a friend.

In the summer of 1981, José Antonio Querejeta, who had returned to the team after passing through Real Madrid and had been tested by FC Barcelona, was transferred to Joventut. The direction of Iñaki Iriarte from the bench and the contribution of Cambronero Peio, Txomin Sautu, Salva Diez, Mikel Cuadra, Xabier Jon Davalillo and Luis Mari Junguitu allowed the team to promote to the 1st division and return to the place that it had occupied among the great teams for almost a decade. A new change in the presidency of the club allowed the arrival of José Antonio Apraiz. The season of the return to the top league was not very positive in terms of results, the team ended up in relegation positions with a baggage of three wins, three draws and twenty defeats. Spanish basketball was preparing to enter a new stage marked by professionalism, and the creation of the Liga ACB made it possible for the team to avoid relegation back to the 2nd Division.

As of the 1983–84 season with the first edition of the Liga ACB, the modern Spanish basketball story begins in which the club was strongly committed to leaving its modest club status. Basque guard Alberto Ortega returns to the team, one of the stars of the league like Essie Hollis and Rilley Clarida became the first couple of foreigners of the club because the new Liga ACB allowed the signing of two foreign players per team. In the 1984–85 season, José Antonio Querejeta returned to the team, Pablo Laso made the leap to the first team after his trip at an American institute with only 16 years, which together with another youth player like Aitor Zárate formed the youngest guards in the league. As a counterpoint to this commitment to youth, an illustrious veteran of Spanish basketball like Miguel López signed for the team. Completing the incorporations with the arrival of Terry White as new foreign player for the team led by Xabier Añua.

In 1985, the club won its first official title, the Copa Asociación which was played among the teams eliminated in the first round of the league playoffs. In the final, the team won to the Zaragoza led by Pepe Laso in Villanueva de La Serena (Badajoz). José Antonio Querejeta was the top scorer of the game with 30 points and the team earned the qualification to the Korać Cup for the following season. At the institutional level, Jose Antonio Santamaría is again the club president. The 1985–86 season was marked by the Korać Cup debut. The first rival was the Dutch Super Cracks Werkendam, which was clearly defeated at home (73–88) and overwhelmingly in Vitoria-Gasteiz (130–94). The next rival was the French ASVEL. In the home game, the Basque team fell against the French team 84–94, but this defeat did not undermine the team hopes to seek the comeback weeks later in Lyon. The game played in the French town at the end of game resulted in a draw at 88 points, but the competition system computed the difference in points of both clashes and meant the elimination of the Basque team from the competition.

At that time, important foreigners such as Abdul Jeelani and Larry Micheaux arrived who gave a plus of quality to a large team from the team (Alberto Ortega, José Antonio Querejeta, Pablo Laso, Jesús Brizuela and the young players Madoz, Urdiain, Felix De La Fuente and Arana) and directed by Pepe Laso who returned to be the head coach of the team for two seasons. A season later, the captain of the team, Iñaki Garaialde, who was honored in Polideportivo Mendizorrotza days before the start of the 1987–88 season, retired as a player. Manu Moreno took over the bench as the head coach. Names like Fede Ramiro, or Agustin Cuesta with an already important experience in Spanish basketball reinforced the team. Larry Micheaux and David Lawrence formed the American couple, but the weak performance of the second led to its replacement by the jumpy Nikita Wilson midway through the season. The team was strong at home and began to stand up to rivals with a bigger budget. The season ended in eighth position.

At the start of the 1988–89 season, José Antonio Querejeta retired as a player. A few weeks after his retirement, offered himself as a candidate for the presidency of the club and José Antonio Santamaría gave his position to the former player, being one of the youngest presidents of the ACB. As president, began the process of converting the club into a Sociedad Anónima Deportiva, as required by the Sports Law. The club became the first Spanish professional sport club to carry out this transformation and was born under the name of Saski-Baskonia S.A.D.. The Baskonia of José Antonio Querejeta wanted to take another step in the professionalization of the club taking as an example the NBA franchises and began to make his first important bets, the signing of Chicho Sibilio after being one of the stars of FC Barcelona. Puerto Rican pivot from the Boston Celtics, Ramón Rivas and the signing of the Argentine Marcelo Nicola who signed a 10-year deal as a franchise player in which the club would settle in the 90s.

The objective was to overcome the seventh place in the final standings that would allow the pass to compete in European competitions. Despite these important bets, the 1989–90 season the club failed to take that step forward. Halfway through the season, Manu Moreno was sacked as coach and the Željko Pavličević signed after a brilliant record in Cibona. However, the team fell in the first round of playoffs against Real Madrid and closed his short stay in Vitoria-Gasteiz as a head coach.

=== 1990–2010: introducing in European basketball and first trophies ===
With José Antonio Querejeta as president, the club grows exponentially. Herb Brown signed as head coach and Alfredo Salazar began his travels through Argentina to capture talent. In 1991, the club left Polideportivo Mendizorrotza to move to the Araba Arena, which lived its extension from 5,000 to 9,500 spectators at the end of the decade. In 1993, Manel Comas signed as head coach. With Manel Comas, the team won its first Spanish King's Cup, when Pablo Laso and Velimir Perasović led the team to an historical win. The club was already making noise internationally too, reaching the FIBA European Cup final in both 1994 and 1995. When it hosted the same title game in 1996, the team pleased its many fans by downing PAOK behind 31 points from Ramón Rivas. After the departure of Manel Comas, Sergio Scariolo signed as head coach. With Scariolo, the team made its first Spanish Championship playoff final in 1998 and added a second Spanish King's Cup title in 1999. Names like Ramón Rivas, Marcelo Nicola, Juan Alberto Espil, Pablo Laso, Elmer Bennett or Velimir Perasović were some of the protagonists of that decade.

The team started the 21st century with Duško Ivanović on the bench. In his first year, they then found quick success in the newly reborn EuroLeague. With a deep roster featuring Elmer Bennett, Saulius Štombergas, Victor Alexander, Fabricio Oberto and a young Luis Scola, Baskonia reached the 2001 Euroleague Finals, before losing to Virtus Bologna in the fifth and final game on the road. With winning momentum and the additions of Dejan Tomašević and Andrés Nocioni, the team achieved its first double in the next season, with another Spanish King's Cup trophy and its first Spanish League title ever. Baskonia snatched two more Spanish King's Cups, in 2004 and 2006, as Luis Scola and Pablo Prigioni played decisive roles, and success followed the team in the EuroLeague. Baskonia's arrival to its first EuroLeague Final Four in 2005 couldn't have been louder, as the team upset favored host CSKA Moscow in the semi-finals, but couldn't overcome defending champ Maccabi in the title game.

Back home, Baskonia again reached the Spanish League finals, only to lose in dramatic fashion. Baskonia returned to the EuroLeague Final Four in 2006, but once again Maccabi stood in its way, this time in the semi-final. The team also made it to the Spanish League finals, but was swept there. The next season, Baskonia won its EuroLeague regular season and Top 16 groups before sweeping Olympiacos in the Playoffs, as Scola became the Euroleague Basketball's top all-time scorer at that time. Nonetheless, eventual champion Panathinaikos downed Baskonia in the semi-finals and once home again in Spain, Baskonia lost in the semi-finals.

Baskonia reached four consecutive EuroLeague Final Fours from 2005 to 2008. The team lost to Maccabi Tel Aviv in the 2005 final and 2006 semi-finals, to Panathinaikos in the 2007 semi-finals, and to CSKA Moscow in the 2008 semi-finals.

In the 2007–08 season, the team led by Neven Spahija won its second Spanish Liga ACB championship. In 2008–09 season, the team added its sixth Spanish King's Cup title. In the 2009–10 season, Baskonia won its third Spanish Liga ACB championship by sweeping FC Barcelona on a memorable series-winning three-point play by Fernando San Emeterio. Names like Luis Scola, Andrés Nocioni, Pablo Prigioni. Igor Rakočević, Arvydas Macijauskas, José Calderón, Pete Mickeal or Tiago Splitter were some of the protagonists of that decade.

=== 2010–present: new arena and the new EuroLeague era ===
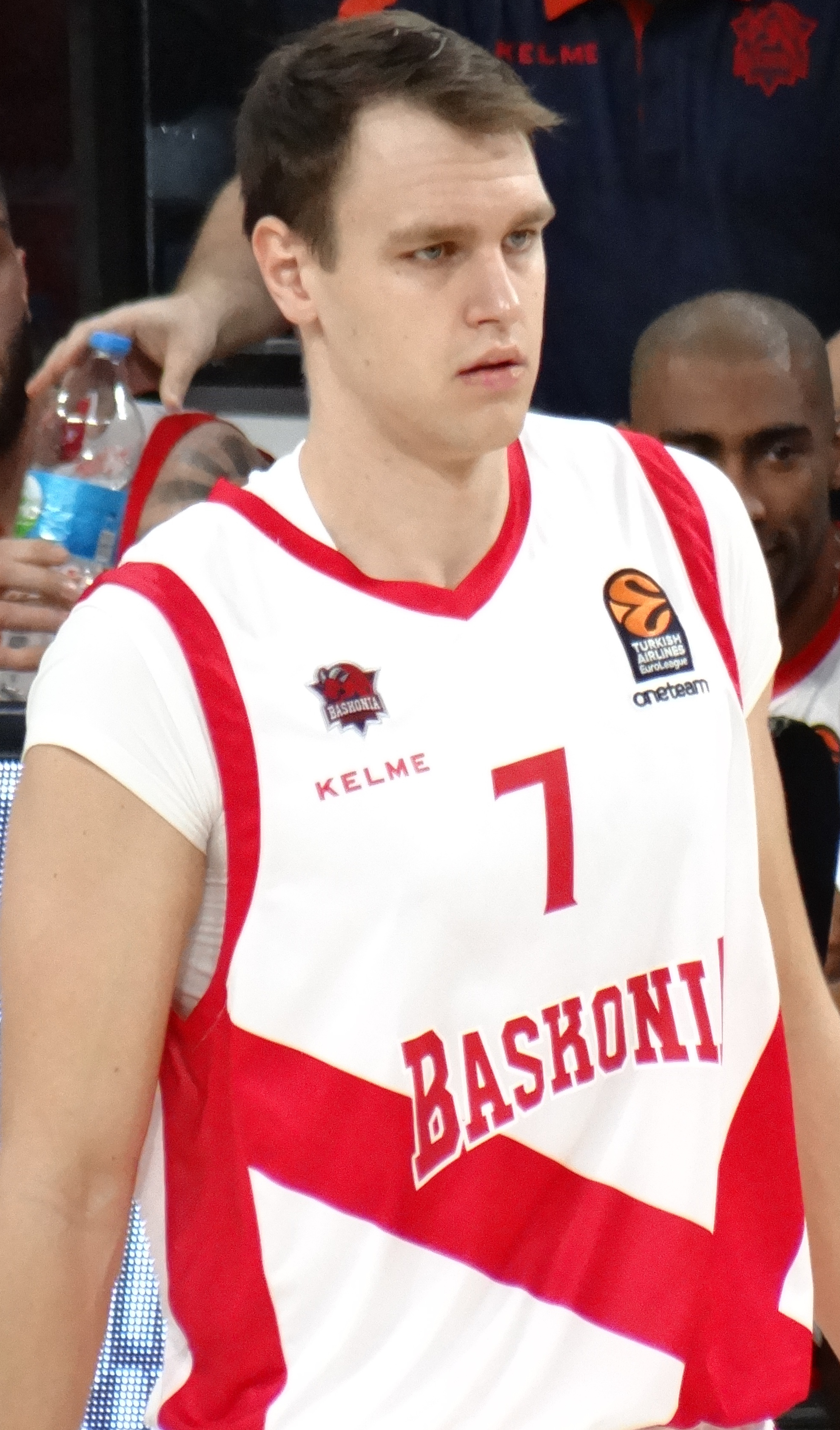
Johannes Voigtmann with Baskonia, in 2017.

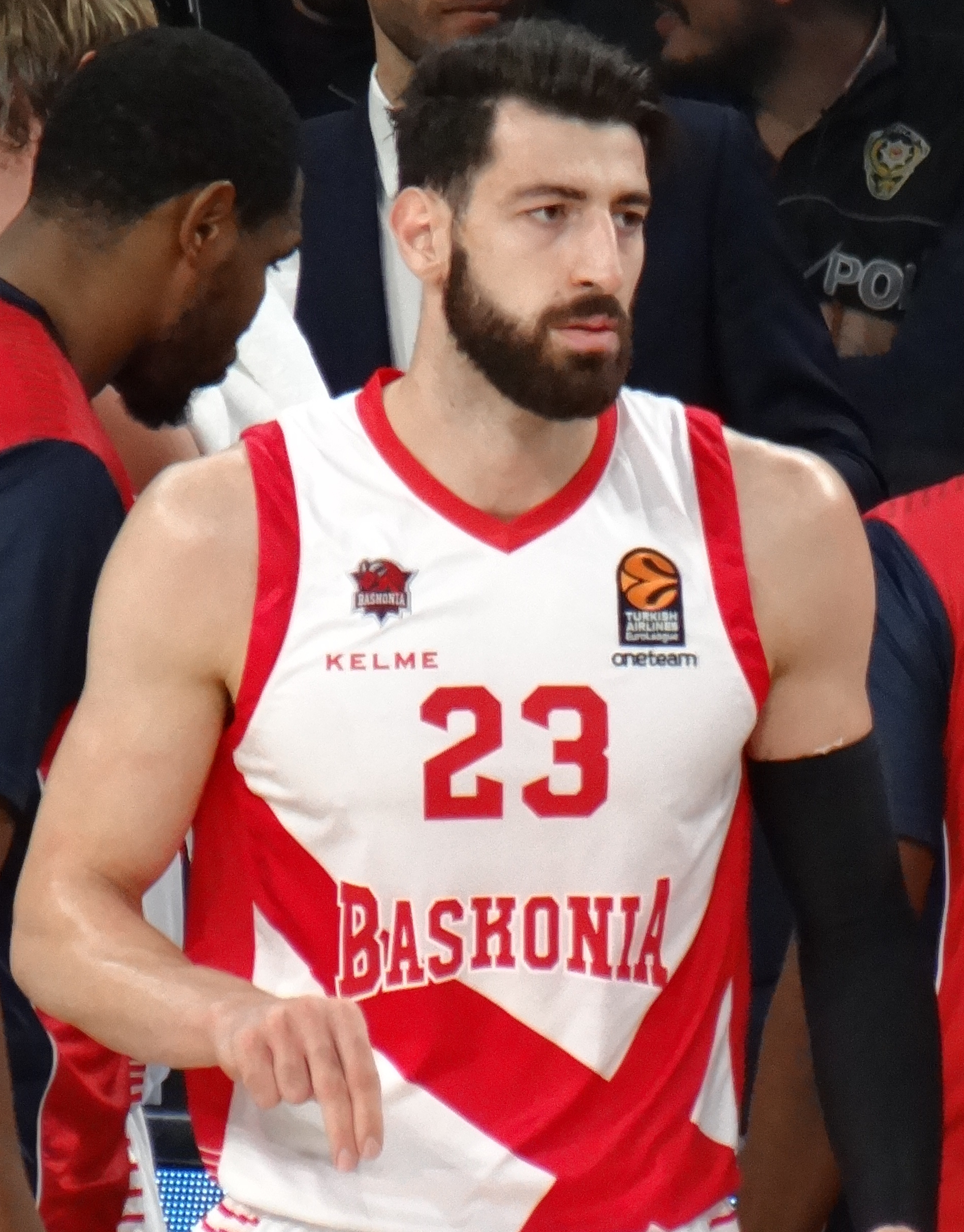
Tornike Shengelia with Baskonia, in 2017.

In 2012, its arena Fernando Buesa Arena was expanded to 15,504 seats and the many initiatives the club continues to put into practice show that Baskonia is always moving forward. The club reached the EuroLeague Playoffs in 2011 and 2012 and reached the Top 16 14 times in 15 years. In 2016, Baskonia returned the EuroLeague Final Four for the first time in eight years, as the club made it to the 2016 Final Four. Here the team was defeated after overtime in the semi-final by Fenerbahçe. In the third place game, Baskonia lost to Russian side Lokomotiv Kuban.

In the 2016–17 season, the EuroLeague adopted a new league-style format in which a round-robin season of sixteen teams was played. In the first season in the new format, the team changed its core of players and also its head coach, but still remained deep in the playoff zone for most of the regular season and ended up advancing to the next phase with a 17–13 record and seventh place. A four-game winning streak in December and another in March covered up for a negative run of six losses in seven games between Rounds 17 and 23. Baskonia clinched a playoff berth for the 10th time in 12 seasons, but there the team was swept by CSKA Moscow after three tough games. Ádám Hanga was one of the team leaders and was chosen as the EuroLeague Best Defender by the league's head coaches, and Baskonia showed, once again, its innate ability to sign talent that seemed to go under the radar for everybody else with names like Shane Larkin, Johannes Voigtmann and Rodrigue Beaubois playing major roles.

In the 2017–18 season, the club advanced to the playoffs for the third consecutive year and put up a major fight against Fenerbahçe before falling in four games. None of that was looking likely when the Basque club suffered a shocking start, losing its first four games to signal the departure from the coaching position of club legend Pablo Prigioni. The man appointed to turn things around was Pedro Martínez, who immediately effected a remarkable revival as Baskonia won four of its next five games to ignite its challenge. A mid-season dip left the side in the bottom half of the standings heading into the final few weeks of the regular season, but then came a dramatic surge in form that yielded six consecutive win, with the consistent excellence of versatile big man Tornike Shengelia earning him the monthly MVP award for March. A top half finish was sealed with a home win over Maccabi Tel Aviv in Round 29, and although disappointment followed against Fenerbahçe, that playoff berth was a just reward for Baskonia's typically spirited recovery from its slow start. The team was also highly competitive on the domestic front, earning a second-place finish in the Spanish League after pushing Real Madrid hard in the finals.

The 2018–19 season was an important season for the club with the Final Four taking place on its home court. A slow start caused Baskonia to part ways with head coach Pedro Martínez and bring back club legend Velimir Perasović to replace him. Baskonia kept struggling on the road, but won 10 of its last 11 regular season games – including victories against playoff-bound teams CSKA Moscow, Panathinaikos and Real Madrid – to reach the playoffs from sixth place. Baskonia managed to do something no team had done in over a decade – steal home-court advantage in a playoff series against CSKA, but the Russian powerhouse recovered with back-to-back wins at Buesa Arena to qualify for the Final Four and eventually win the title. Vincent Poirier was chosen to the All-EuroLeague Second Team. Baskonia had early exits in its two main domestic competitions; it lost against Joventut in the Copa del Rey quarterfinals and against Zaragoza in the Spanish League quarterfinals.

On 30 June 2020, ten years after their last title, Baskonia won the 2019–20 ACB season, marked by the COVID-19 pandemic.

== Sponsorship naming ==
The club was often referred to for years as TAU Cerámica, a Spanish brand name of ceramics manufacturer TAULELL, which name sponsored the club from 1987 to 2009. Originally, TAULELL used another of its brand names, Taugrés, as the name of the team, before changing the name to TAU Cerámica in 1997. TAU, Taugrés and TAU Vitoria were also frequently used to refer to the team. Baskonia, Saski Baskonia, and Saski Baskonia, S.A.D. refer to the name of the actual sports club itself. In 2009, the Spanish credit union Caja Laboral became the new name sponsor of the club and increased the amount of money that the name sponsor contributes to the sports club's budget. In 2016, Laboral Kutxa end its sponsorship naming to Baskonia.

Baskonia has received diverse sponsorship names along the years:

- Caja Álava (1983–1987)
- Taugrés (1987–1997) / Tau Cerámica (1997–2009)
- Caja Laboral / Laboral Kutxa (2009–2016)
- Kirolbet Baskonia (2018–2020)
- TD Systems Baskonia (2020–2021)
- Bitci Baskonia (2021–2022)
- Cazoo Baskonia (2022–2023)
- Kosner Baskonia (2025–)

== Arena ==
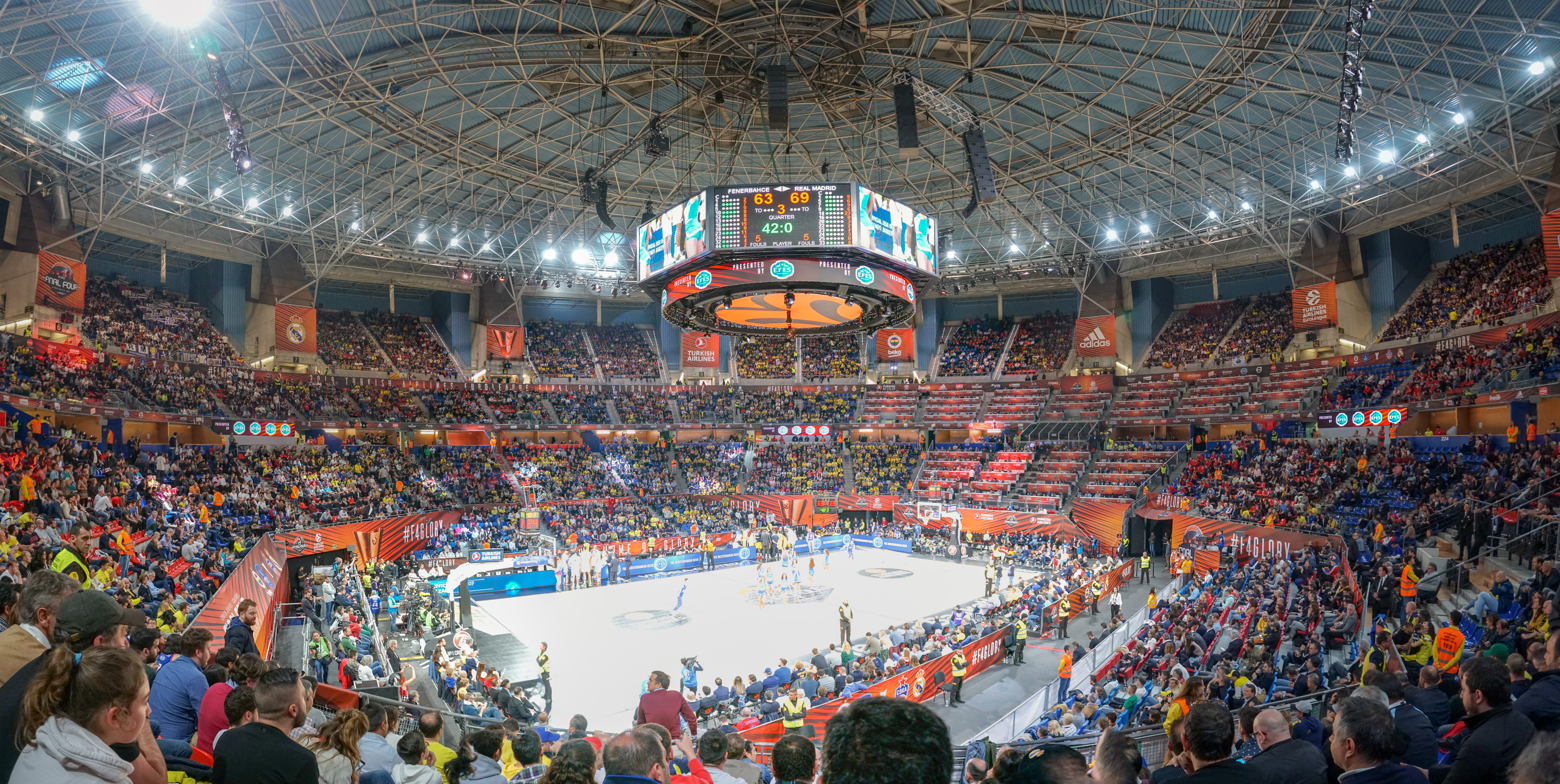
Fernando Buesa Arena during the 2019 EuroLeague Final Four.

Since 1991, Baskonia has played its home games at the Fernando Buesa Arena, which has a seating capacity of 15,504 people for basketball games. The arena was originally called the Pabellón Araba, from 1991 to 2000. The arena was extensively renovated and expanded in the year 2012.

The arena hosted the 1996 FIBA European Cup Final, in which Baskonia won the title and also hosted the 2010 Eurocup Finals, before hosting the EuroLeague Final Four in 2019.

== Players ==
=== Current roster ===
Note: Flags indicate national team eligibility at FIBA-sanctioned events. Players may hold other non-FIBA nationalities not displayed.

Baskonia Vitoria-Gasteiz roster
Players
Coaches

| Pos. | No. | Nat. | Name | Ht. | Wt. | Age |
|---|---|---|---|---|---|---|
| SG | 1 | (Canada) | Lawson, A. J. | 2.01 m (6 ft 7 in) | 84 kg (185 lb) | 26 – 15 July 2000 |
| PG | 2 | (Ivory Coast) | Simmons, Kobi | 1.95 m (6 ft 5 in) | 86 kg (190 lb) | 29 – 4 July 1997 |
| SF | 3 | (North Macedonia) | Stewart Jr., D.J. | 1.98 m (6 ft 6 in) | 93 kg (205 lb) | 27 – 28 July 1999 |
| SG | 5 | (Dominican Republic) | Duarte, Chris | 1.98 m (6 ft 6 in) | 86 kg (190 lb) | 29 – 13 June 1997 |
| SG | 6 | (Slovenia) | Joksimović, Stefan (Y) | 2.04 m (6 ft 8 in) | 85 kg (187 lb) | 18 – 16 November 2008 |
| PF | 7 | (Latvia) | Kurucs, Rodions | 2.06 m (6 ft 9 in) | 104 kg (229 lb) | 28 – 5 February 1998 |
| PF | 8 | (Lithuania) | Sedekerskis, Tadas (C) | 2.06 m (6 ft 9 in) | 101 kg (223 lb) | 28 – 17 January 1998 |
| SG | 10 | (Italy) | Spagnolo, Matteo | 1.97 m (6 ft 6 in) | 89 kg (196 lb) | 23 – 10 January 2003 |
| C | 11 | (Latvia) | Šmits, Rolands | 2.08 m (6 ft 10 in) | 107 kg (236 lb) | 31 – 25 June 1995 |
| PG | 12 | (Democratic Republic of the Congo) | Baugh, Damion | 1.92 m (6 ft 4 in) | 88 kg (194 lb) | 26 – 3 August 2000 |
| C | 21 | (Brazil) | Santos, Márcio (injured) | 2.04 m (6 ft 8 in) | 114 kg (251 lb) | 24 – 2 November 2002 |
| PF | 25 | (France) | Frisch, Clément | 2.01 m (6 ft 7 in) | 100 kg (220 lb) | 24 – 7 January 2002 |
| C | 34 | (Bosnia and Herzegovina) | Kamenjaš, Kenan | 2.07 m (6 ft 9 in) | 105 kg (231 lb) | 26 – 17 January 2000 |
| C | 35 | (United States) | Faried, Kenneth (injured) | 2.02 m (6 ft 8 in) | 103 kg (227 lb) | 37 – 19 January 1989 |

Head coach

- (Croatian Basketball Federation) Velimir Perasović

Assistant coach(es)

- (Spanish Basketball Federation) Pablo Pin
- (Spanish Basketball Federation) Xabier Aspe
- (Spanish Basketball Federation) Miguel Ángel Hoyo

Legend

- (C) Team captain
- (Y) Youth player
- Injured

- Roster
- Transactions
Updated: November 14, 2026

=== Depth chart ===
| Pos. | Starting 5 | Bench 1 | Bench 2 | Inactive |
|---|---|---|---|---|
| C | Rolands Šmits | Kenan Kamenjaš | | Márcio Santos (injured) |
| PF | Tadas Sedekerskis | Rodions Kurucs | Clément Frisch | Kenneth Faried (injured) |
| SF | D.J. Stewart Jr. | A. J. Lawson |
| SG | Chris Duarte | Matteo Spagnolo | Stefan Joksimović |
| PG | Kobi Simmons | Damion Baugh |

Notes: Blue – homegrown player; (Note: A homegrown player is a player that played for at least three years before the age of 20 on a Spanish team. In Liga ACB, the team must register at least four homegrown players in rosters of 10–12 players or at least three homegrown players in rosters of 8–9 players. In EuroLeague, the team did not have any limitations regarding the number of homegrown players.) Red – overseas player; (Note: An overseas player is a player from outside EEA, FIBA Europe or ACP states. In Liga ACB, the team may register at most two overseas players. In EuroLeague, the team did not have any limitations regarding the number of overseas players.) Purple – community player; (Note: Comunitarios (loosely translated as "Community players") refers to any player who holds a passport from a country within the European Union (EU), the European Economic Area (EEA), or an associated nation with specific treaties. In Liga ACB, if a European player signs with a Spanish team, they are registered as a Comunitario. Teams can theoretically sign an unlimited number of these players, provided they still satisfy the mandatory homegrown quota (cupos).) Black – cotonou status player; (Note: Cotonou status is a massive roster loophole in European basketball. It allows players from 78 African, Caribbean, and Pacific (ACP) countries to be treated exactly like EU citizens (Comunitarios) for employment purposes. In Liga ACB, a player with a passport from a Cotonou country does not count toward the maximum limit of 2 non-EU imports.) Green – youth player (Note: In Liga ACB, the team may register under-22 players linked to the youth system. In EuroLeague, the team may register under-20 players linked to the youth system.)

=== Retired jerseys ===
Despite not having retired any number in its history, five of the club's most notable players have a jersey with the number they wore in their time with the team hung at the Fernando Buesa Arena. These are Pablo Prigioni (#5), whose shirt was put on display in 2017; Igor Rakočević (#8) and Sergi Vidal (#9), who followed suit in 2020; Luis Scola (#4), who was inducted in 2023; and Tiago Splitter (#21), who was inducted in 2024.

Baskonia retired jerseys
| No. | Nat. | Player | Pos. | Tenure | Ceremony date |
| 4 | (Argentina) | Luis Scola | PF | 1998–2007 | 3 November 2023 |
| 5 | (Argentina) | Pablo Prigioni | PG | 2003–2009, 2011–2012, 2016–2017 | 15 January 2017 |
| 8 | (Serbia) | Igor Rakočević | SG | 2006–2009 | 19 December 2019 |
| 9 | (Spain) | Sergi Vidal | SF | 2000–2009 | 19 December 2019 |
| 21 | (Brazil) | Tiago Splitter | C | 2000–2010 | 5 May 2024 |

== Notable players ==
Note: Flags indicate national team eligibility at FIBA-sanctioned events. Players may hold other non-FIBA nationalities not displayed.

Criteria

To appear in this section a player must have either:

- Set a club record or won an individual award while at the club
- Played at least one official international match for their national team at any time
- Played at least one official NBA match at any time.

- (Spain) Carlos Cabezas
- (Spain) José Calderón
- (Spain) Carlos Cazorla
- (Spain) Ilimane Diop
- (Spain) Jorge Garbajosa
- (Spain) Roberto Íñiguez
- (Spain) Pablo Laso
- (Spain) Fernando San Emeterio
- (Spain) Pau Ribas
- (Spain) Sergi Vidal
- (Argentina) Walter Herrmann
- (Argentina) Marcelo Nicola
- (Argentina) Andrés Nocioni
- (Argentina) Fabricio Oberto
- (Argentina) Pablo Prigioni
- (Argentina) Luis Scola
- (Argentina) Luca Vildoza
- (Bosnia and Herzegovina) Mirza Teletović
- (Brazil) Marcelo Huertas
- (Brazil) Tiago Splitter
- (Bulgaria) Georgi Glouchkov
- (Croatia) Velimir Perasović
- (Croatia) Zoran Planinić
- (Croatia) Darko Planinić
- (Croatia) Roko Ukić
- (Estonia) Maik Kotsar
- (Estonia) Sander Raieste
- (France) Jim Bilba
- (France) Laurent Foirest
- (France) Thomas Heurtel
- (France) William Phillips
- (France) Kevin Séraphin
- (Finland) Hanno Möttölä
- (Georgia (country)) Tornike Shengelia
- (Germany) Tibor Pleiß
- (Germany) Johannes Voigtmann
- (Greece) Ioannis Bourousis
- (Greece) Christos Charissis
- (Greece) Nikos Rogkavopoulos
- (Hungary) Kornél Dávid
- (Hungary) Ádám Hanga
- (Republic of Ireland) Pat Burke
- (Israel) Lior Eliyahu
- (Italy) Andrea Bargnani
- (Italy) Simone Fontecchio
- (Italy) Achille Polonara
- (Italy) Stefano Rusconi
- (Latvia) Dāvis Bertāns
- (Latvia) Jānis Timma
- (Lithuania) Simas Jasaitis
- (Lithuania) Rimantas Kaukėnas
- (Lithuania) Arvydas Macijauskas
- (Lithuania) Saulius Štombergas
- (Lithuania) Mindaugas Timinskas
- (Lithuania) Rokas Giedraitis
- (Montenegro) Predrag Drobnjak
- (Nigeria) Chima Moneke
- (Poland) Thomas Kelati
- (Poland) Maciej Lampe
- (Poland) David Logan
- (Puerto Rico) Ramón Rivas
- (Serbia) Miroslav Berić
- (Serbia) Nemanja Bjelica
- (Serbia) Vladimir Micov
- (Serbia) Dejan Tomašević
- (Serbia) Igor Rakočević
- (Slovakia) Richard Petruška
- (Slovenia) Goran Dragić
- (Slovenia) Zoran Dragić
- (Slovenia) Jaka Blažič
- (Turkey) Ender Arslan
- (Turkey) Serkan Erdoğan
- (Turkey) Kaya Peker
- (United Kingdom) Andrew Betts
- (United States) (Israel) Max Heidegger
- (United States) Victor Alexander
- (United States) Jerome Allen
- (United States) J. J. Anderson
- (United States) Joe Arlauckas
- (United States) Wade Baldwin IV
- (United States) Ken Bannister
- (United States) Scooter Barry
- (United States) Elmer Bennett
- (United States) Anthony Bonner
- (United States) Ryan Bowen
- (United States) Rickey Brown
- (United States) Chase Budinger
- (United States) Lionel Chalmers
- (United States) Chris Corchiani
- (United States) Pat Durham
- (United States) Rashard Griffith
- (United States) Travis Hansen
- (United States) Pierriá Henry
- (United States) Darrun Hilliard
- (United States) Essie Hollis
- (United States) Casey Jacobsen
- (United States) Mike James
- (United States) Linton Johnson
- (United States) Jalen Jones
- (United States) Randolph Keys
- (United States) Shane Larkin
- (United States) Will McDonald
- (United States) Jordan McRae
- (United States) Larry Micheaux
- (United States) Pete Mickeal
- (United States) Drew Nicholas
- (United States) Dan O'Sullivan
- (United States) Lamar Odom
- (United States) Lou Roe
- (United States) Brent Scott
- (United States) James Singleton
- (United States) Matt Steigenga
- (United States) Darius Thompson
- (United States) Nikita Wilson
- (United States) David Wood

=== Players at the NBA draft ===
| Position | Player | Year | Round | Pick | Drafted by |
|---|---|---|---|---|---|
| PF | (Argentina) Marcelo Nicola | 1993 | 2nd round | 30th | Houston Rockets |
| PF | (Argentina) Luis Scola | 2002 | 2nd round | 56th | San Antonio Spurs |
| PF/C | (Brazil) Tiago Splitter | 2007 | 1st round | 28th | San Antonio Spurs |

== Head coaches ==
- (Spain) Vicente Elejalde 1959–1969
- (Spain) Pepe Laso 1969–1977, 1985–1987
- (Spain) Juan Antonio Ortiz de Pinedo 1977–1978, 1982–1983
- (Spain) Iñaki Iriarte 1978–1980, 1981–1983, 1992–1993
- (Spain) Manu Moreno 1980–1981, 1987–1989
- (Spain) Txema Capetillo 1983–1984
- (Spain) Xabier Añúa 1984–1985
- (Socialist Federal Republic of Yugoslavia) Željko Pavličević 1989–1990
- (United States) Herb Brown 1990–1992
- (Spain) Manel Comas 1993–1997
- (Italy) Sergio Scariolo 1997–1999, 2013–2014
- (Spain) Salva Maldonado 1999
- (Argentina) Julio Lamas 1999–2000
- (Montenegro) Duško Ivanović 2000–2005, 2008–2012, 2019–2021, 2023–2024
- (Spain) Pedro Martínez 2005, 2017–2018
- (Croatia) Velimir Perasović 2005–2007, 2015–2016, 2018–2019, 2026–present
- (Spain) Natxo Lezkano 2007
- (Serbia) Božidar Maljković 2007
- (Croatia) Neven Spahija 2007–2008, 2021–2022
- (Croatia) Žan Tabak 2012–2013
- (Italy) Marco Crespi 2014
- (Spain) Ibon Navarro 2014–2015
- (Spain) Sito Alonso 2016–2017
- (Argentina) Pablo Prigioni 2017
- (Spain) Joan Peñarroya 2022–2023
- (Spain) Pablo Laso 2024–2025
- (Italy) Paolo Galbiati 2025–2026

Source: baskonistas.com

== Logos ==
Tau sponsorship logo (1987–2009)

Caja Laboral sponsorship logo (2009–2013)

Non commercial logo (2010–2016)

Non commercial logo (2016–present)

== Season by season ==
| Season | Tier | Division | Pos. | W–L | Copa del Rey | Other cups | | European competitions | | |
|---|---|---|---|---|---|---|---|---|---|---|
| 1959 | Foundation of Club Deportivo Vasconia | | | | | | | | | |
| 1959–60 | 4 | Provincial | 2nd | | | | | | | |
| 1960–61 | 4 | Provincial | 2nd | | | | | | | |
| 1961–62 | 4 | Provincial | 1st | | | | | | | |
| 1962–63 | 4 | Provincial | 2nd | | | | | | | |
| 1963–64 | 4 | Provincial | 1st | | | | | | | |
| 1964–65 | 4 | Provincial | 2nd | | | | | | | |
| 1965–66 | 4 | Provincial | 1st | | | | | | | |
| 1966–67 | 4 | Provincial | 2nd | | | | | | | |
| 1967–68 | 4 | Provincial | 1st | | | | | | | |
| 1968–69 | 4 | Provincial | 1st | | | | | | | |
| 1969–70 | 3 | 3ª División | 1st | 10–5 | | | | | | |
| 1970–71 | 2 | 2ª División | 2nd | 20–4 | | | | | | |
| 1971–72 | 2 | 2ª División | 1st | 21–3 | | | | | | |
| 1972–73 | 1 | 1ª División | 10th | 12–18 | Semi-finalist | | | | | |
| 1973–74 | 1 | 1ª División | 8th | 12–16 | | | | | | |
| 1974–75 | 1 | 1ª División | 8th | 8–14 | Quarter-finalist | | | | | |
| 1975–76 | 1 | 1ª División | 8th | 14–18 | | | | | | |
| 1976 | Converting in Club Deportivo Basconia | | | | | | | | | |
| 1976–77 | 1 | 1ª División | 10th | 8–14 | First round | | | | | |
| 1977–78 | 1 | 1ª División | 10th | 7–1–14 | First round | | | | | |
| 1978–79 | 1 | 1ª División | 8th | 9–13 | Semi-finalist | | | | | |
| 1979–80 | 1 | 1ª División | 11th | 5–2–15 | Round of 16 | | | | | |
| 1980–81 | 1 | 1ª División | 14th | 6–20 | Round of 16 | | | | | |
| 1981–82 | 2 | 1ª División B | 2nd | 19–1–6 | | | | | | |
| 1982–83 | 1 | 1ª División | 13th | 3–3–20 | Round of 16 | | | | | |
| 1983–84 | 1 | Liga ACB | 9th | 9–22 | Round of 16 | | | | | |
| 1984–85 | 1 | Liga ACB | 10th | 8–22 | | Copa Asociación | C | | | |
| 1985–86 | 1 | Liga ACB | 9th | 16–14 | | Copa Príncipe | QF | 3 Korać Cup | R2 | 0–1–1 |
| 1986–87 | 1 | Liga ACB | 8th | 15–18 | | Copa Príncipe | R16 | | | |
| 1987–88 | 1 | Liga ACB | 8th | 19–14 | | Copa Príncipe | R16 | | | |
| 1988 | Converting in Saski-Baskonia S.A.D. | | | | | | | | | |
| 1988–89 | 1 | Liga ACB | 7th | 21–17 | Round of 16 | | | | | |
| 1989–90 | 1 | Liga ACB | 7th | 23–15 | Quarter-finalist | | | | | |
| 1990–91 | 1 | Liga ACB | 4th | 26–16 | Quarter-finalist | | | | | |
| 1991–92 | 1 | Liga ACB | 4th | 30–15 | Quarter-finalist | | | 3 Korać Cup | QF | 6–6 |
| 1992–93 | 1 | Liga ACB | 11th | 19–14 | Third position | | | 3 Korać Cup | GS | 6–4 |
| 1993–94 | 1 | Liga ACB | 11th | 17–15 | Runner-up | | | 2 European Cup | RU | 11–4 |
| 1994–95 | 1 | Liga ACB | 5th | 24–17 | Champion | | | 2 European Cup | RU | 12–3 |
| 1995–96 | 1 | Liga ACB | 8th | 22–19 | | | | 2 European Cup | C | 13–1–3 |
| 1996–97 | 1 | Liga ACB | 5th | 21–17 | | | | 3 Korać Cup | R16 | 8–2 |
| 1997–98 | 1 | Liga ACB | 2nd | 34–10 | Quarter-finalist | | | 3 Korać Cup | R32 | 5–3 |
| 1998–99 | 1 | Liga ACB | 5th | 25–13 | Champion | | | 1 EuroLeague | GS | 4–6 |
| 1999–00 | 1 | Liga ACB | 4th | 25–18 | Quarter-finalist | | | 2 Saporta Cup | R16 | 9–5 |
| 2000–01 | 1 | Liga ACB | 3rd | 32–11 | Quarter-finalist | | | 1 Euroleague | RU | 15–7 |
| 2001–02 | 1 | Liga ACB | 1st | 33–12 | Champion | | | 1 Euroleague | T16 | 13–7 |
| 2002–03 | 1 | Liga ACB | 6th | 20–19 | Runner-up | | | 1 Euroleague | T16 | 11–9 |
| 2003–04 | 1 | Liga ACB | 3rd | 32–10 | Champion | | | 1 Euroleague | T16 | 13–7 |
| 2004–05 | 1 | Liga ACB | 2nd | 36–11 | Semi-finalist | Supercopa | 4th | 1 Euroleague | RU | 13–11 |
| 2005–06 | 1 | Liga ACB | 2nd | 31–13 | Champion | Supercopa | C | 1 Euroleague | 3rd | 18–7 |
| 2006–07 | 1 | Liga ACB | 3rd | 31–11 | Semi-finalist | Supercopa | C | 1 Euroleague | 4th | 20–4 |
| 2007–08 | 1 | Liga ACB | 1st | 29–13 | Runner-up | Supercopa | C | 1 Euroleague | 4th | 16–9 |
| 2008–09 | 1 | Liga ACB | 2nd | 33–8 | Champion | Supercopa | C | 1 Euroleague | QF | 14–7 |
| 2009–10 | 1 | Liga ACB | 1st | 35–9 | Semi-finalist | Supercopa | SF | 1 Euroleague | QF | 11–9 |
| 2010–11 | 1 | Liga ACB | 4th | 25–14 | Semi-finalist | Supercopa | SF | 1 Euroleague | QF | 10–10 |
| 2011–12 | 1 | Liga ACB | 3rd | 27–14 | Semi-finalist | Supercopa | RU | 1 Euroleague | RS | 5–5 |
| 2012–13 | 1 | Liga ACB | 5th | 26–11 | Semi-finalist | | | 1 Euroleague | QF | 13–15 |
| 2013–14 | 1 | Liga ACB | 6th | 19–17 | Quarter-finalist | Supercopa | SF | 1 Euroleague | T16 | 11–13 |
| 2014–15 | 1 | Liga ACB | 6th | 20–17 | | Supercopa | SF | 1 Euroleague | T16 | 11–13 |
| 2015–16 | 1 | Liga ACB | 4th | 27–14 | Semi-finalist | | | 1 Euroleague | 4th | 18–11 |
| 2016–17 | 1 | Liga ACB | 3rd | 26–13 | Semi-finalist | Supercopa | SF | 1 EuroLeague | 7th | 17–16 |
| 2017–18 | 1 | Liga ACB | 2nd | 31–13 | Quarter-finalist | | | 1 EuroLeague | 7th | 17–17 |
| 2018–19 | 1 | Liga ACB | 5th | 26–10 | Quarter-finalist | Supercopa | RU | 1 EuroLeague | 7th | 16–18 |
| 2019–20 | 1 | Liga ACB | 1st | 17–13 | | | | 1 EuroLeague | – | 12–16 |
| 2020–21 | 1 | Liga ACB | 5th | 24–15 | Semi-finalist | Supercopa | SF | 1 EuroLeague | 10th | 18–16 |
| 2021–22 | 1 | Liga ACB | 4th | 22–18 | | | | 1 EuroLeague | 9th | 12–16 |
| 2022–23 | 1 | Liga ACB | 5th | 28–8 | Quarter-finalist | | | 1 EuroLeague | 9th | 18–16 |
| 2023–24 | 1 | Liga ACB | 9th | 18–16 | | | | 1 EuroLeague | 8th | 19–20 |
| 2024–25 | 1 | Liga ACB | 8th | 19–17 | | | | 1 EuroLeague | 14th | 14–20 |
| 2025–26 | 1 | Liga ACB | 6th | 26–11 | Champion | | | 1 EuroLeague | 18th | 13–25 |
| 2026–27 | 1 | Liga ACB | | | | Supercopa | SF | 1 EuroLeague | | |

== Honours and other achievements ==
Honours
| Type | Competition | Titles | Seasons |
| International | FIBA Saporta Cup | 1 | 1995–96 |
| Domestic | Spanish League | 4 | 2001–02, 2007–08, 2009–10, 2019–20 |
| Domestic | Spanish Cup | 7 | 1995, 1999, 2002, 2004, 2006, 2009, 2026 |
| Domestic | Spanish Supercup | 4 | 2005, 2006, 2007, 2008 |

=== Other Achievements ===
==== International competitions ====
- EuroLeague
  - Runners-up (2): 2000–01, 2004–05
  - 3rd place (1): 2005–06
  - 4th place (3): 2006–07, 2007–08, 2015–16
  - Final Four (6): 2001, 2005, 2006, 2007, 2008, 2016
- FIBA Saporta Cup
  - Runners-up (2): 1993–94, 1994–95

==== Domestic competitions ====
- Spanish League
  - Runners-up (5): 1997–98, 2004–05, 2005–06, 2008–09, 2017–18
- Spanish Cup
  - Runners-up (3): 1994, 2003, 2008
- Spanish Supercup
  - Runners-up (2): 2011, 2018

==== Other competitions ====
- Association Cup

Winners (1): 1985

- 2nd Division

Winners (1): 1971–72

- Basque Cup

Winners (4): 2010–11, 2011–12, 2018–19, 2022–23

- Trofeo Diputación / Álava

Winners (29): 1991, 1992, 1995, 1996, 1997, 1999, 2000, 2001, 2002, 2003, 2004, 2005, 2006, 2007, 2008, 2009, 2010, 2011, 2012, 2013, 2014, 2016, 2017, 2018, 2019, 2021, 2022, 2023, 2024

- Estella, Spain Invitational Game

Winners (1): 2007

- Logroño, Spain Invitational Game

Winners (1): 2007

- Ourense, Spain Invitational Game

Winners (1): 2008

- Tudela, Spain Invitational Game

Winners (1): 2008

- Torneo de Lleida Stagepro

3rd Place (1): 2009

- Switzerland Invitational Game

Winners (1): 2010

- Torneo Angers

Winners (1): 2010

- Lanzarote, Spain Invitational Game

Winners (1): 2011

- Bergara, Spain Invitational Game

Winners (1): 2015

- Torneo Fundacion CID

Runners-up (1): 2016

== Individual awards ==
All-EuroLeague First Team

- Dejan Tomašević – 2002
- Arvydas Macijauskas – 2005
- Luis Scola – 2006, 2007
- Tiago Splitter – 2008
- Igor Rakočević – 2009
- Fernando San Emeterio – 2011
- Ioannis Bourousis – 2016
- Tornike Shengelia – 2018

All-EuroLeague Second Team

- Andrés Nocioni – 2003, 2004
- Luis Scola – 2005
- Pablo Prigioni – 2006, 2007
- Igor Rakočević – 2007
- Tiago Splitter – 2009, 2010
- Vincent Poirier – 2019
- Darius Thompson – 2023

EuroLeague Best Defender

- Ádám Hanga – 2017

EuroLeague Top Scorer "Alphonso Ford"

- Igor Rakočević – 2007, 2009
- Markus Howard – 2024

ACB Most Valuable Player

- Kenny Green – 1997
- Andrés Nocioni – 2004
- Luis Scola – 2005, 2007
- Tiago Splitter – 2010
- Fernando San Emeterio – 2011
- Ioannis Bourousis – 2016

ACB Finals MVP

- Elmer Bennett – 2002
- Pete Mickeal – 2008
- Tiago Splitter – 2010
- Luca Vildoza – 2020

All-ACB First Team

- Andrés Nocioni – 2004, 2013
- Luis Scola – 2004, 2005, 2006, 2007
- José Calderón – 2005
- Pablo Prigioni – 2006, 2007, 2009
- Igor Rakočević – 2009
- Tiago Splitter – 2010
- Marcelo Huertas – 2011
- Fernando San Emeterio – 2011
- Mirza Teletović – 2012
- Darius Adams – 2016
- Ioannis Bourousis – 2016
- Ádám Hanga – 2017
- Tornike Shengelia – 2018
- Pierriá Henry – 2021
- Darius Thompson – 2023
- Markus Howard – 2023, 2024
- Timothé Luwawu-Cabarrot – 2026

All-ACB Second Team

- Ádám Hanga – 2016
- Shane Larkin – 2017
- Tornike Shengelia – 2019, 2020
- Vincent Poirier – 2019
- Rokas Giedraitis – 2021

ACB Top Scorer

- Ray Price – 1974
- Webb Williams – 1979
- Claude Gregory – 1983
- Igor Rakočević – 2009
- Darius Adams – 2016
- Markus Howard – 2024
- Timothé Luwawu-Cabarrot – 2026

ACB Rising Star

- Mirza Teletović – 2008

ACB Most Spectacular Player

- Tornike Shengelia – 2019

Spanish Cup MVP

- Joe Arlauckas – 1993
- Velimir Perasović – 1994
- Pablo Laso – 1995
- Elmer Bennett – 1999
- Dejan Tomašević – 2002
- Pablo Prigioni – 2007
- Mirza Teletović – 2009
- Trent Forrest – 2026

Supercup MVP

- Luis Scola – 2005
- Tiago Splitter – 2006, 2007
- Pablo Prigioni – 2008

== Matches against NBA teams ==
14 October 2010

Boxscore

| Memphis Grizzlies (United States) | 110–105 | (Spain) Caja Laboral |

FedExForum, Memphis, TN

16 October 2010

Boxscore

| San Antonio Spurs (United States) | 108–85 | (Spain) Caja Laboral |

AT&T Center, San Antonio, TX

== Baskonia B ==
Baskonia B is the reserve team of Baskonia. It currently plays in Tercera FEB, the fourth tier of Spanish basketball.
