= En Tol Sarmiento =

Spanish music group

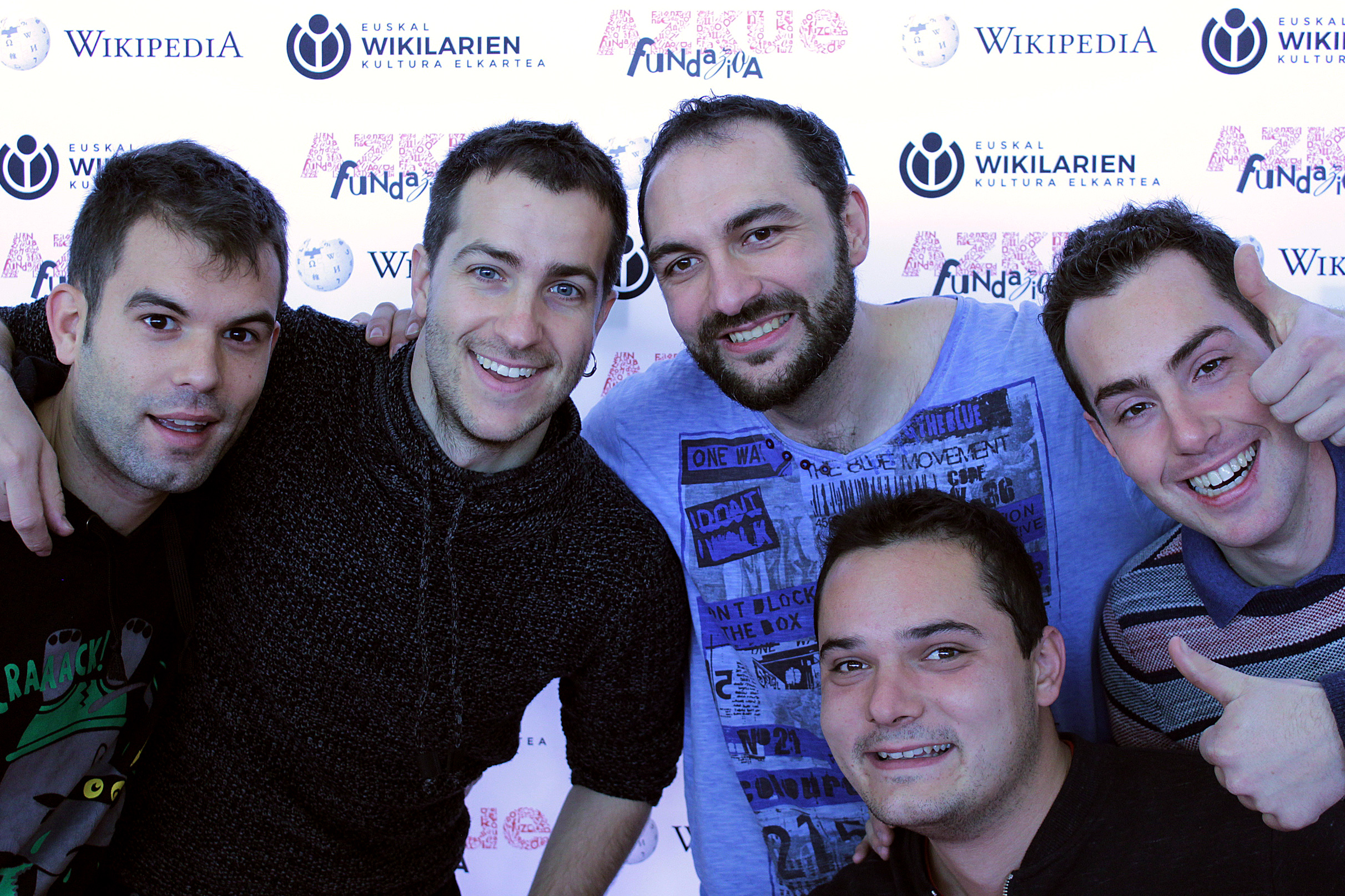
En Tol Sarmiento

En Tol Sarmiento, also known as ETS or E.T.S, is a ska music group which was created in Yécora/Iekora (Álava) in the Basque Country in the year 2005. Since then they have performed more than 200 concerts all around the Basque Country. Their music is characterised by strong rhythms, lively tunes and powerful lyrics, written both in Castilian Spanish and Basque which mention a wide types of topics, from hedonistic social commentary to more existential themes, but always maintaining a cheerful tone.

== History ==
This band's first album was called Vendimia Seleccionada (2008). However, it is quite difficult to find copies of it as they made very few. After some concerts around the Rioja Alavesa region, they caught the attention of producer Baga Biga, and they went on to create another album with this company: Hacia la Luna, in 2012). The lead single from this record, named "Musikaren doinua", quickly became a big success. To this day they continue singing it at concerts throughout the Basque Country. After going on tour with some 50 concerts, the group recorded another record (Zure mundua, 2014), once again with the company Baga Biga. In that year concerts in Vitoria-Gasteiz and Araba Euskaraz brought fame to the song "Piztuko dugu". In November 2015 they released their third record with Baga Biga, Beldurrik ez.

In March 2025, to celebrate their 20-year anniversary, the band played 3 sold out shows at the Bizkaia Arena (BEC) in the Basque Country, to 45,000 fans across the 3 dates. The shows featured several special guests, including Zetak, Dupla, Süne and members of Huntza.

Following this, the band announced arena shows for Madrid and Barcelona in 2026.

== Curiosities ==
In August 2015, Spotify revealed that En Tol Sarmiento was the group most listened to by underage people in the Basque Country.

== Members ==
- Iñigo Etxe – voice and guitar
- Rubén Campinún – bass guitar
- Alex Alonso – drums
- Javier Lucas – trombone
- Rubén Terreros – trumpet
- Gari – piano

== Discography ==
Albums

- Vendimia seleccionada (2008)
- Hacia la luna (Baga-Biga, 2012)
- Zure mundua (Baga-Biga, 2014)
- Beldurrik ez (Baga-Biga, 2015)
- Aukeria Berriak (Baga-Biga, 2020) No. 81 Spain
- Guretzat (Baga-Biga, 2023)
- Konkista (Baga-Biga, 2025)
