= God Save the Queen (disambiguation) =

"God Save the Queen" is the national anthem of the United Kingdom and the royal anthem of most Commonwealth realms, when there is a female monarch.

God Save the Queen may also refer to:

- "God Save the Queen" (Sex Pistols song), 1977, also covered by Motörhead in 2000
- "God Save the Queen", a song by Conrad Sewell from Precious
- "God Save the Queen", an instrumental by Queen on the 1975 album A Night at the Opera
- "God Save the Queen", an episode of the television series My Lady Jane
- God Save the Queen (comics), a 2007 graphic novella
- God Save the Queen/Under Heavy Manners, a 1980 album by Robert Fripp
- God Save the Queen (band), an Argentine tribute band
- GSTQ, a clothing brand by Dany Garcia

== See also ==
- God Save the King (disambiguation)
