= Yécora =

Yécora may refer to:

- Yécora, Sonora
- Yécora/Iekora, in the Basque Country
