= Josep Gusó =

Spanish businessman and football executive (1959–2019)

Josep Gusó i Garganta
- Born: 1959
- Died: 1 March 2019 (aged 59–60)
- Occupations: Businessman; Football executive
- Known for: President of Girona FC (2005–2010)

Josep Gusó i Garganta (1959 – 1 March 2019) was a Spanish businessman and football executive from Catalonia who served as the president of Girona FC from 2005 to 2010.

During Gusó's presidency, Girona won promotion to Segunda División B in the 2006–07 promotion play-offs, defeating RSD Alcalá. They then achieved a second consecutive promotion in 2007–08, after beating AD Ceuta 1-0 at Estadi Montilivi on 16 June 2008, to return to the Segunda División after an absence of 49 years. This also marked the club's return to professional football.

He also oversaw the financial operation that allowed the club to convert into a Sociedad Anónima Deportiva (S.A.D.), then a requirement for remaining in the Segunda División. In 2010, after serious financial problems at the club, including unpaid wages and bonuses owed to players, Gusó resigned as president and later sold his majority shareholding to businessman Josep Delgado, ending his association with Girona.

He died on 1 March 2019, aged 60, after a long illness.
