= 2010 Copa del Rey de Baloncesto =

The Copa del Rey 2009-10 was the 74th edition of the Spanish basketball Cup. It was managed by the ACB and was disputed in Bilbao, Basque Country in the Bizkaia Arena between days 18 and 21 of February.

== Brackett ==
| Quarterfinals; February 18 & 19 | | Semifinals; February 20 | | Final; February 21 |
| PE Valencia | 75 |
| Asefa Estudiantes | 73 | PE Valencia | 64 |
| Regal Barcelona | 77 | Regal Barcelona | 72 |
| Cajasol | 72 | | | Regal Barcelona | 80 |
| Bilbao Bizkaia Basket | 62 | | | Real Madrid | 61 |
| Caja Laboral | 75 | Caja Laboral | 50 |
| Real Madrid | 90 | Real Madrid | 78 |
| DKV Joventut | 82 |

=== Quarterfinals ===
FORTA & Teledeporte (Spain)

February 18
19:00 GTM+1

Report

| (Valencian Community) Power Electronics Valencia | 75–73 | (Community of Madrid) Asefa Estudiantes |
Scoring by quarter: 20-20, 15-12, 20-21, 20-20
| Pts: Martínez 18; Rebs: Nielsen 6 Asts: Martínez 3 | | Pts: Caner-Medley 24; Rebs: Caner-Medley 8 Asts: Oliver, Granger 4 |

Bizkaia Arena, Bilbao
Attendance: 12,475
Referees: Xavier Amorós, M.A. Pérez Pérez, Oscar Perea

La 2 (Spain)

February 18
21:35 GTM+1

Report

| (Catalonia) Regal Barcelona | 77–72 | (Andalusia) Cajasol |
Scoring by quarter: 20-24, 17-13, 22-12, 18-23
| Pts: Navarro 15; Rebs: Mickeal 7 Asts: Rubio 7 | | Pts: Kirksay 15; Rebs: Kirksay 10; Asts: Calloway 5 |

Bizkaia Arena, Bilbao
Attendance: 12,834
Referees: De la Maza, Redondo and García González

Teledeporte (Spain)

February 19
19:30 GTM+1

Report

| (Basque Country (autonomous community)) Bizkaia Bilbao Basket | 62–75 | (Basque Country (autonomous community)) Caja Laboral |
Scoring by quarter: 11-20, 20-17, 16-26, 15-12
| Pts: Banić 22; Rebs: Hervelle 5 Asts: Salgado 8 | | Pts: San Emeterio 23; Rebs: San Emeterio 7 Asts: four players 2 |

Bizkaia Arena, Bilbao
Attendance: 14,417
Referees: J.A. Martín Bertrán, Daniel Hierrezuelo, Jiménez Trujillo

La 2 (Spain)

February 19
21:50 GTM+1

Report

| (Community of Madrid) Real Madrid | 90–82 | (Catalonia) DKV Joventut |
Scoring by quarter: 23-20, 28-19, 16-19, 23-24
| Pts: Llull 29; Rebs: Garbajosa 8 Asts: Prigioni 7 | | Pts: Bogdanović 16; Rebs: Bogdanović 6 Asts: Tucker 6 |

Bizkaia Arena, Bilbao
Attendance: 14,417
Referees: Juan Carlos Arteaga, E. Pérez Pizarro, Antonio Conde

=== Semifinals ===
FORTA & Teledeporte (Spain)

February 20
18:00 GTM+1

Report

| (Valencian Community) Power Electronics Valencia | 64–72 | (Catalonia) Regal FC Barcelona |
Scoring by quarter: 13-22, 19-13, 17-20, 15-17
| Pts: Nielsen 19; Rebs: three players 4 Asts: Nielsen 2 | | Pts: Vázquez 16; Rebs: N'Dong 9 Asts: Rubio 4 |

Bizkaia Arena, Bilbao
Attendance: 13,916
Referees: Daniel Hierrezuelo, E. Pérez Pizarro, Redondo

La 2 (Spain)

February 20
20:30 GTM+1

Report

| (Basque Country (autonomous community)) Caja Laboral | 50–78 | (Community of Madrid) Real Madrid |
Scoring by quarter: 18-17, 9-23, 16-18, 7-20
| Pts: Eliyahu, San Emeterio 10; Rebs: Barać 6 Asts: English 2 | | Pts: Lavrinovič 21; Rebs: Lavrinovič 7 Asts: Prigioni 4 |

Bizkaia Arena, Bilbao
Attendance: 14,403
Referees: Juan Carlos Arteaga, J.A. Martín Bertrán, Antonio Conde

=== Final ===
La 2 & Teledeporte (Spain)

February 21
19:00 GTM+1

Report

| (Catalonia) Regal Barcelona | 80–61 | (Community of Madrid) Real Madrid |
Scoring by quarter: 19-16, 21-9, 24-12, 16-24
| Pts: Vázquez 14; Rebs: Mickeal, Lorbek 6 Asts: Sada 4 | | Pts: Veličković, Lavrinovič 11; Rebs: Reyes 9 Asts: Prigioni, Jarić 4 |

Bizkaia Arena, Bilbao
Attendance: 14,814
Referees: Juan Carlos Arteaga, E. Pérez Pizarro, J.C García González

Copa del Rey 2010 Champions

Regal Barcelona
21st title

- MVP of the Tournament: Fran Vázquez

== Television broadcasting ==
- TVE2, FORTA and Teledeporte.
