= Trofeo Álava (basketball) =

The Trofeo Álava is a basketball friendly competition held in Vitoria-Gasteiz, Basque Country by the local team, Baskonia. It is held in the preseason, usually around late August to early September.

After an agreement was signed by the Provincial Council of Álava and Saski Baskonia in 1990, the tournament was set to be played under the name "Trofeo Diputación Foral de Álava", and it would serve as an introduction between the season's team and the fans. It featured Baskonia and two other teams, usually having a Liga ACB team and an international team have a round-robin tournament to determine the overall winner. From 1996 onwards, the format changed to a single game tournament, and has remained like that ever since. In 2018, the name "Trofeo Álava / Araba Saria" was adopted, but it is still commonly referred to as Trofeo Diputación by Baskonia fans.

The tournament has been held every year since 1991, with the exceptions of 1998, as the expansion works for the Araba Arena were being carried out during the months when the tournament was played, and 2020, caused by the COVID-19 pandemic. Out of the 31 times it has been contested, Baskonia has won it 28 times.

== Results ==
Year	Champion	Score	Runner-up
1991	(Basque Country (autonomous community)) Taugrés Baskonia	1W-1L, avg +6	(Italy) Benetton Treviso & (Spain) CAI Zaragoza
1992	(Basque Country (autonomous community)) Taugrés Baskonia	2W-0L	(Spain) Estudiantes & (Croatia) KK Cibona
1993	(Catalonia) Joventut Badalona	2W-0L	(Spain) Estudiantes & (Basque Country (autonomous community)) Taugrés Baskonia
1994	(Ukraine) Dynamo Kyiv	1W-1L, avg +3	(Spain) CB Valladolid & (Basque Country (autonomous community)) Taugrés Baskonia
1995	(Basque Country (autonomous community)) Taugrés Baskonia	uncertain	(Portugal) Porto & (Spain) CB Murcia
1996	(Basque Country (autonomous community)) Taugrés Baskonia	85-76	(Greece) Panathinaikos
1997	(Basque Country (autonomous community)) Taugrés Baskonia	88-84	(Catalonia) Barcelona
1998	not held		
1999	(Basque Country (autonomous community)) TAU Cerámica Baskonia	121-67	(Bosnia and Herzegovina) Bosna Sarajevo
2000	(Basque Country (autonomous community)) TAU Cerámica Baskonia	88-74	(France) Pau-Orthez
2001	(Basque Country (autonomous community)) TAU Cerámica Baskonia	87-65	(France) Pau-Orthez
2002	(Basque Country (autonomous community)) TAU Cerámica Baskonia	90-81	(Federal Republic of Yugoslavia) KK Partizan
2003	(Basque Country (autonomous community)) TAU Cerámica Baskonia	80-70	(Russia) Dynamo Moscow
2004	(Basque Country (autonomous community)) TAU Cerámica Baskonia	85-78	(Lithuania) Lietuvos Rytas
2005	(Basque Country (autonomous community)) TAU Cerámica Baskonia	95-82	(Russia) UNICS Kazan
2006	(Basque Country (autonomous community)) TAU Cerámica Baskonia	85-78	(Lithuania) Lietuvos Rytas
2007	(Basque Country (autonomous community)) TAU Cerámica Baskonia	63-57	(Spain) Cajasol Sevilla
2008	(Basque Country (autonomous community)) TAU Cerámica Baskonia	103-83	(Basque Country (autonomous community)) Gipuzkoa Basket
2009	(Basque Country (autonomous community)) Caja Laboral Baskonia	90-89	(Basque Country (autonomous community)) Gipuzkoa Basket
2010	(Basque Country (autonomous community)) Caja Laboral Baskonia	67-62	(Spain) CB Gran Canaria
2011	(Basque Country (autonomous community)) Caja Laboral Baskonia	75-68	(Spain) Real Madrid
2012	(Basque Country (autonomous community)) Caja Laboral Baskonia	77-75	(Italy) Olimpia Milano
2013	(Basque Country (autonomous community)) Laboral Kutxa Baskonia	76-64	(France) ASVEL Villeurbane
2014	(Basque Country (autonomous community)) Laboral Kutxa Baskonia	86-79	(Russia) BC Khimki
2015	(Italy) Aquila Basket Trento	86-76	(Basque Country (autonomous community)) Laboral Kutxa Baskonia
2016	(Basque Country (autonomous community)) Baskonia	96-81	(Venezuela) Guaros de Lara
2017	(Basque Country (autonomous community)) Baskonia	97-75	Hapoel Jerusalem
2018	(Basque Country (autonomous community)) Kirolbet Baskonia	87-77	(Germany) Alba Berlin
2019	(Basque Country (autonomous community)) Kirolbet Baskonia	78-75	(Spain) Iberostar Tenerife
2020	not held		
2021	(Basque Country (autonomous community)) Baskonia	101-56	(Romania) CSU Sibiu
2022	(Basque Country (autonomous community)) Cazoo Baskonia	100-82	(England) London Lions
2023	(Basque Country (autonomous community)) Baskonia	86-85	(Italy) Derthona Basket
2024	(Basque Country (autonomous community)) Baskonia	93-76	(Italy) Pallacanestro Trieste
2025	not held		
2026	not held		
