= Yécora/Iekora =

Municipality in Álava, Basque Country, Spain

- Municipality
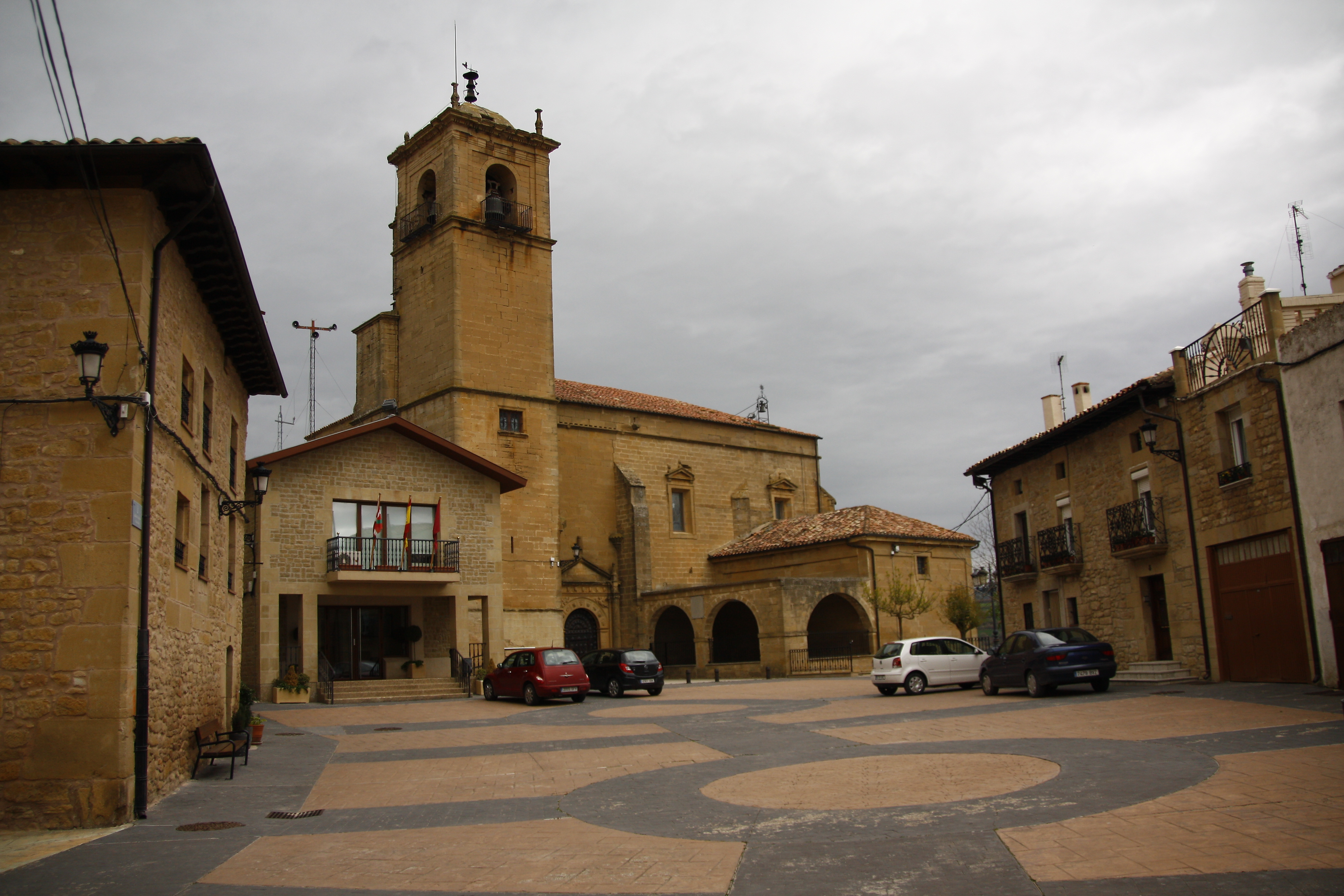
- Town hall and church of the town of Iekora in Rioja Alavesa

- Coat of arms

- Location of Yécora/Iekora within the Basque Country
- Coordinates: 42°34′4″N 2°28′13″W
- Country: Spain
- Autonomous Community: Basque Country
- Province: Álava
- Comarca: Arabako Errioxa / Rioja Alavesa

Government
  - Mayor: Iñaki Ibañez Fernandez

Area
  - Total: 18.80 km^{2} (7.26 sq mi)
- Elevation (AMSL): 694 m (2,277 ft)

Population (2025-01-01)
  - Total: 278
  - Density: 14.8/km^{2} (38.3/sq mi)
- Time zone: UTC+1 (CET)
  - Summer (DST): UTC+2 (CEST (GMT +2))
- Postal code: 01322
- Area code: +34 (Spain) + 94 (Biscay)

Yécora (Basque: Iekora) is a town and municipality in the province of Álava, in the Basque Country, northern Spain.

== Geography ==
Yecora has an area of 18.8 km ² and a population of 299 inhabitants (2008). Yecora is situated in southern Álava, within the wine region of Rioja Alavesa, on the border with Navarre, close to La Rioja. Yecora is at 694m above sea level, at the foot of the mountains of Cantabria and Codes.

The adjacent municipalities are Lapoblación to the north; Oyón-Oion to the south-east; and Lanciego/Lantziego to the west. The capital of the region, Laguardia, is 15 km to the west. The provincial capital, Vitoria-Gasteiz is 50 km away. The city of Logroño, capital of La Rioja is 13 km to the south.

The nearest villages are Lanciego and Lapoblación.

== Economy and society ==
Yécora is a rural community, with 37% of the workforce working in agriculture and wine production. There are 4 wineries in the village, (/ / John Campinún Vallarmen, and Jalon Ibalonja Solar) that produce Rioja as well as a cooperative, St. Sixtus, which produces wines and Valsierra Campolengo.

The village has a swimming pool, opened in 2006, a health centre, leisure centre and auditorium.

== History ==
The village is first recorded in the 11th century cartulary of San Millán under the name Equora or Ecora. It was then known as Laguardia; in 1669 the king Charles II granted the title of town. The community later adopted the official name Yécora (or Iekora).

== Heritage ==
Yécora has many Renaissance buildings. The most prominent building is the church of San Juan Bautista, built in Gothic and Renaissance style. It has a 14th-century square tower, a Renaissance façade decorated with angels and two columns with Corinthian capitals.

Outside the town is the shrine of Santa María de Bercijana which was restored in 1984.

There is a medieval spring known as the Fuente Vieja.

== Festivals and traditions ==
Several processions are held during the year at the Bercijana shrine. The most important festivals are Santo Domingo in May and the harvest thanksgiving in August.

- In May, celebrating the day of Santo Domingo, the people process from the chapel at Bercijana, carrying the image of the Virgin of Bercijana to the Church of St. John the Baptist in Yécora.
- In late August, during the harvest festival, the people carry the statue of the patron saint of Yécora, accompanied by bagpipes and dance.

These celebrations, together with a traditional pilgrimage to San Tirso in the Sierra de Cantabria in June, are usually held annually in the town.

== Famous people ==
- Miguel de Ayala: He was the bishop of Palencia and Calahorra in the 17th century.
- Fuidio Fidel Rodriguez (1880–1936): religious Marianist who was beatified by the Catholic Church in 1995.
- En Tol Sarmiento, musical group.
