= God Save the King (disambiguation) =

"God Save the King" is the national anthem of the United Kingdom and the royal anthem of most Commonwealth realms.

God Save King, or a similar variant, may also refer to:

- God Save the Tsar!, former Russian national anthem
- E Ola Ke Aliʻi Ke Akua, Hawaiian national anthem
- Bevare Gud vår kung, Swedish royal anthem
- God (?) Save Our King!, North American title of Kyo Kara Maoh! anime
- God Save the King (album), by Copywrite, 2012
- "God Save His King", a song by Lee "Scratch" Perry album from the 2008 album Repentance

== See also ==
- God Save the Queen (disambiguation)
- Gott erhalte Franz den Kaiser ('God Save Emperor Francis'), personal anthem of Holy Roman Emperor Francis II
- God Bless the Prince of Wales, a patriotic song
- God Save the Tsar!, national anthem of the Russian Empire
