= Huntza =

Basque folk rock band

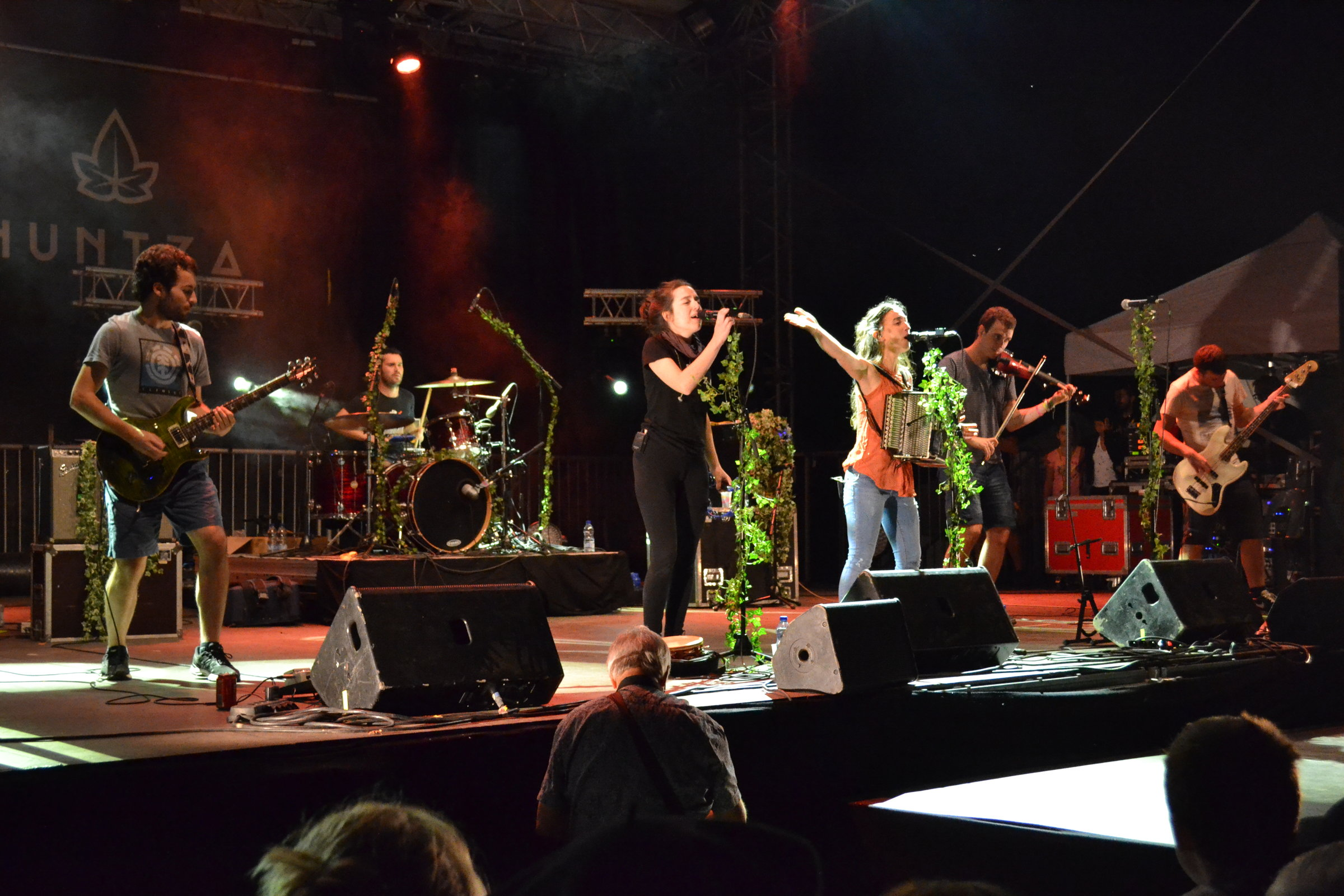

Background information
- Origin: Bilbao, Basque Country
- Genres: Folk rock, folk punk
- Years active: 2014–2024
- Members: Josune Arakistain Salas; Uxue Amonarriz Zubiondo; Aitor Huizi Izagirre; Aitzol Eskisabel Ruiz; Inhar Eskisabel Ruiz; Peru Altube Kazalis
- Website: https://huntza.eus/en/gu-geu/

Huntza is a Basque folk rock band from Bilbao, formed in 2014.

The word Huntza is a Basque noun which means "ivy".

== History ==
The band was created in the streets of Bilbao in 2014. All the members are from different towns of Gipuzkoa.

The band first appeared on 8 March 2016 when they released the song "Harro gaude". In November 2016, they published the single "Aldapan gora", whose music video later became the most viewed song in Basque language on YouTube. The song was included in their first studio album, "Ertzetatik", released in 2016.

In 2017 the single "Lumak" was released, containing two songs.

In 2018 they released their second studio album "Xilema", with the single "Lasai, Lasai".

On 23 February 2023, it was announced that the group would disband, with their last planned concert to be on 3 February 2024.

== Discography ==
Studio albums

- Ertzetatik (2016)
- Xilema (2018)
- Ezin ezer espero (2021)
