= Gatibu =

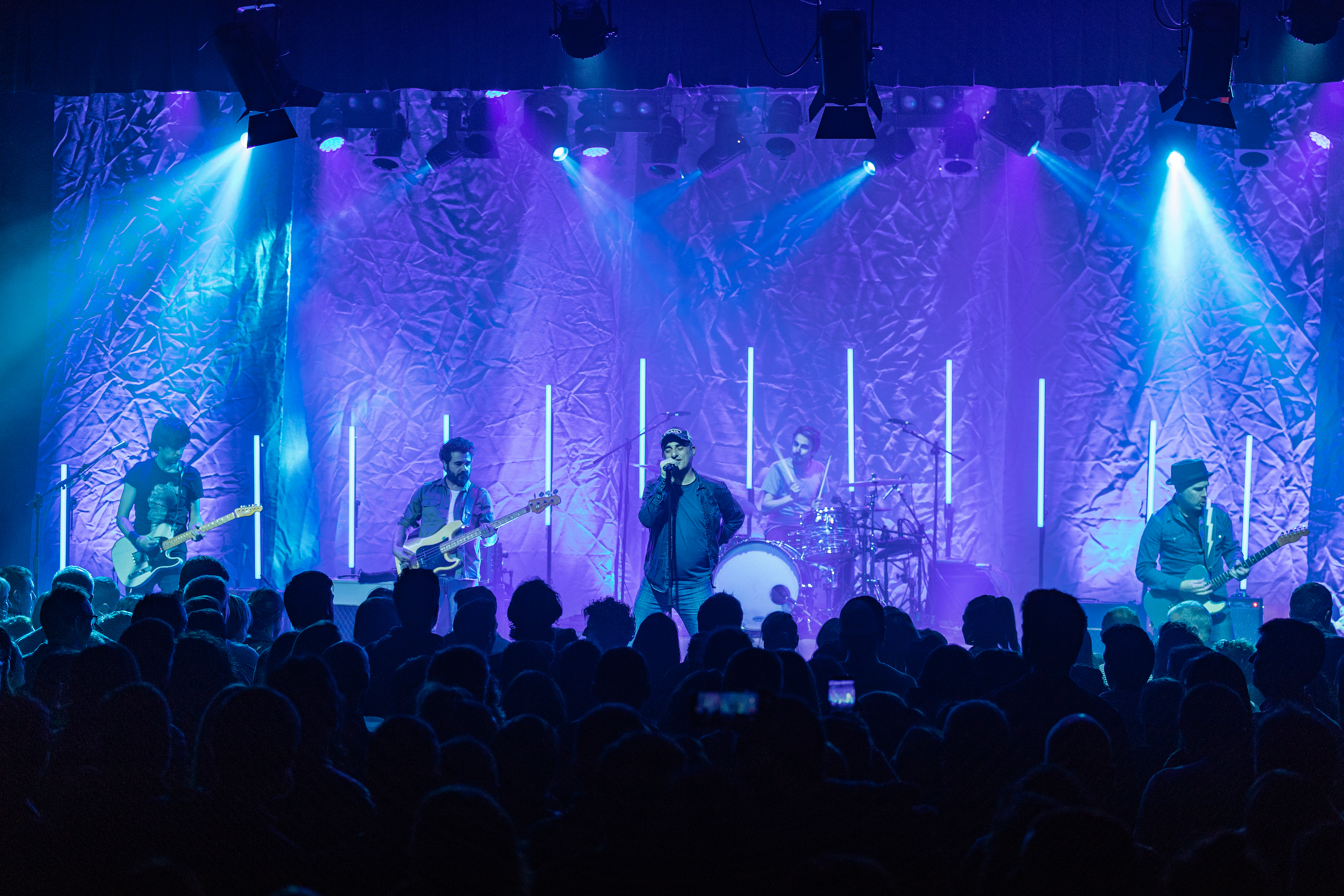
- Gatibu performing in 2019

Background information
- Origin: Gernika-Lumo, Biscay
- Genres: Rock
- Years active: 2002 - present
- Members: Alex Sardui; Haimar Arejita; Mikel Caballero; Gaizka Salazar
- Website: Official page

Gatibu is a Basque rock band from Gernika-Lumo, Biscay, northern Spain. Its name "Gatibu" means 'captive' in Basque. The group was formed around Alex Sardui, former lead vocalist of Exkixu, in summer 2002.

Gatibu is a Basque language band singing largely in the Biscayan dialect. This defense of Biscayan Basque has earned them numerous awards and praise from both institutions and cultural associations.

The band's first album was released in 2002 under the title Zoramena ('madness'). The album was recorded with the label Oihuka in the studio of Iñaki 'Uoho' Antón (Extremoduro and Platero y Tú) located in Muxika (Biscay). Their first album was a great success thanks to tracks like Musturrek sartunde (Putting the hills), earning them public acclaim across the Basque Country and landing the Egaztea award for the best song of 2003. The album featured a collaboration with Fito Cabrales (from Platero y Tú and Fito & Fitipaldis) and Roberto Iniesta (singer of Extremoduro), exceptionally singing songs in Basque.

In 2005, their second studio album was released, Disko Infernu ("Infernal Disco"), featuring songs like Inpernuaren ate joka (knocking on hell's door) or Gogoratzen zaitut (I remember you).

The band tours around local and other topic specific festivals of the Basque Country.

== Awards and nominations ==
Winner. Egaztea 2003. Best Song, "Musturrek Sartunde".

Nomination. Egaztea 2006. Best Live, "Disko Infernu Tour".

Winner. 2006. Bertsolaris Association of Getxo (Biscay).

Winner. Egaztea 2009. Best song, "Bang-Bang Txik-Txiki Bang Bang".

Winner. Egaztea 2009. Best album, "Laino Guztien Gainetik, Sasi Guztien Azpitik".

== Members ==
- Alex Sardui - Voice
- Haimar Arejita - Electric and Acoustic Guitar
- Mikel Caballero - Bass
- Gaizka Salazar - Drum

=== Other members of the Lives ===
Iñigo San Anton - Rhythm guitar (2002 - 2009, continuously).
Iñigo Ibarretxe - Alboka (2002–Present, sporadically).
Luis Camino - Txalaparta, Goblet drum, Udu, Congas (2005, presentation "Disko Infernu Tour").
José Alberto Batiz - Rhythm guitar, Slide guitar (2005 - 2006, continuously).
Cristian Daniel de Resita - Voice (2005–Present, sporadically).
Jon Calvo - Rhythm guitar (2009 - 2010, continuously).
Arkaitz Ortuzar - Rhythm guitar (2011 - 2016, continuously).

== Discography ==
* Zoramena (Oihuka, 2002)

No.	Title	Length
1.	"Musturrek sartunde"
2.	"Bilusik"
3.	"Mila doinu aidien"
4.	"Lorak eskeintzen"
5.	"Urepel"
6.	"Librea naz"
7.	"Ihes"
8.	"Ez dago barroterik"
9.	"Zoramena"
10.	"Ez dot sinisten"

* Disko Infernu (Oihuka, 2005)

No.	Title	Length
1.	"Inpernuen ate joka"
2.	"Besoak zabalik"
3.	"Gaur gure gaba da ta"
4.	"Gerra gogoa"
5.	"Doniene"
6.	"Hara honien"
7.	"Ifer haixien semie"
8.	"Pozarren zu barik"
9.	"Gogoratzen zaitut"
10.	"Egunon (Buna dimineata)"

* Laino Guztien Gainetik, Sasi Guztien Azpitik (Baga-Biga, 2008)

No.	Title	Length
1.	"Bang-bang txik-txiki bang-bang"
2.	"Eztanda egin arte"
3.	"Ure dakar zeruek"
4.	"Bizitzeko gogoa"
5.	"Nor zara zu?"
6.	"Pailazo"
7.	"Zoragarrixori"
8.	"Apirilaren 27"
9.	"Zeu, zeu, zeu!"
10.	"Hitz artien galdute"

* Zuzenean Bizitzeko Gogoa (2010)

No.	Title	Length
1.	"Bang-bang txik-txiki bang bang"
2.	"Bizitzeko gogoa"
3.	"Lorak eskeintzen"
4.	"Gaur gure gaba da ta"
5.	"Apirilaren 27"
6.	"Pailazo"
7.	"Inpernuen ate joka"
8.	"Gerra gogoa"
9.	"Besoak zabalik"
10.	"Egun on"
11.	"Urepel"
12.	"Zeu, zeu, zeu!"
13.	"Prest"
14.	"Behar zaitut"
15.	"Kalekatue"

* Euritan dantzan (2014)

No.	Title	Length
1.	"Zumarragako trena"
2.	"Bizitzen badakit"
3.	"Euritan dantzan"
4.	"Egun bat"
5.	"Zer da"
6.	"Loretxoa"
7.	"Bertsoa"

* Aske Maitte, Aske Bizi (2016)

No.	Title	Length
1.	"Ez Naitu Epaitu"
2.	"Nire Ondoan Basiña"
3.	"Sorgin"
4.	"Txanpon Bat Aldien"
5.	"Infinitorantz"
6.	"Igelak"
7.	"Aske Maitte (feat. Izaro)"

* Azken Indioak (2018)

No.	Title	Length
1.	"Gelditu Zaitez"
2.	"Uhinak"
3.	"Salto!"
4.	"Oh nire Maitie"
5.	"Iraultza Alaia"
6.	"Zure Uretan"
7.	"Ez naz Makurtuko"
