= Lapoblación =

Municipality of Spain

Coordinates: 42°36′17″N 2°28′27″W

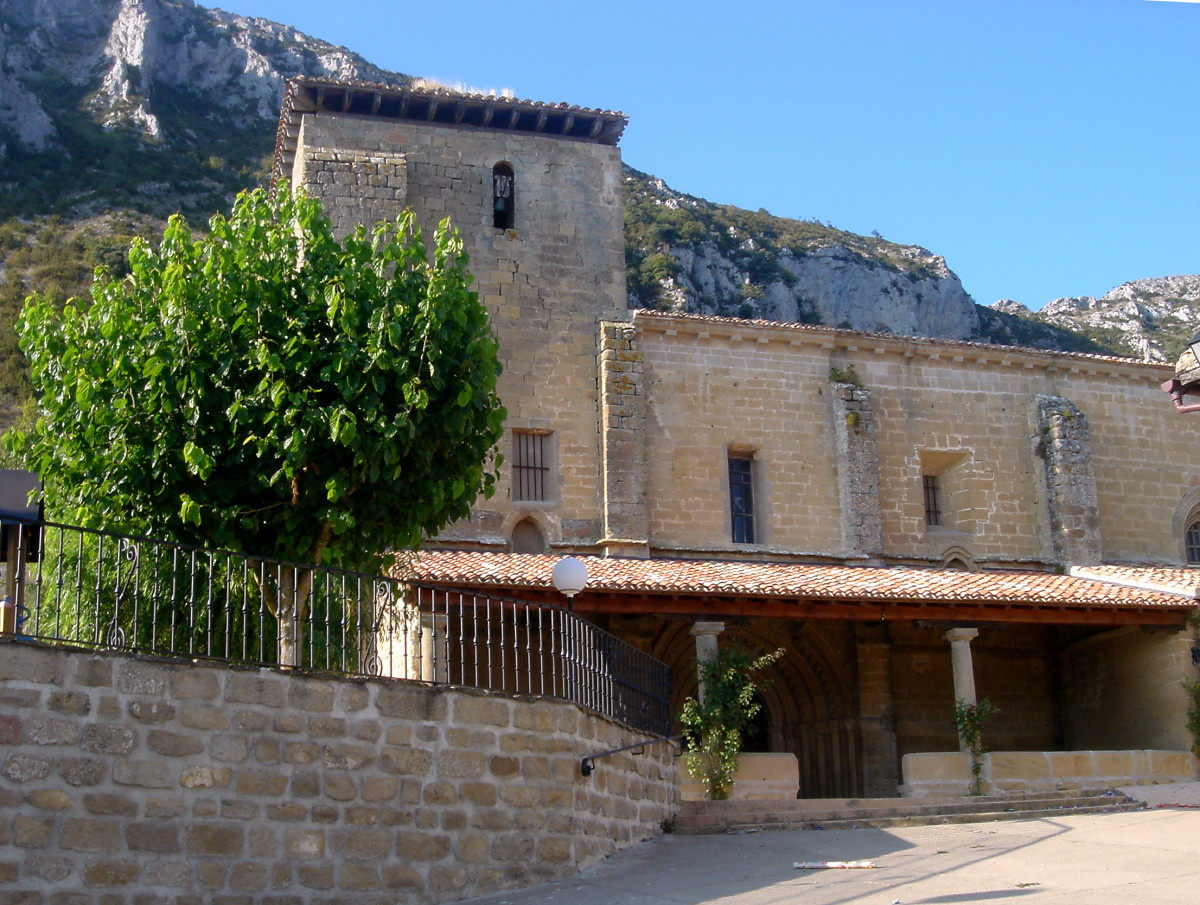
Church of Lapoblacion, Spain

Lapoblación is a town and municipality located in the province and autonomous community of Navarre, northern Spain.
