= Sociedad Anónima Deportiva =

Spanish legal status for sports companies

Sociedad anónima deportiva ("Public limited sports company") is a special type of Spanish public limited company (known as sociedad anónima in Spain). The new legal status was introduced in 1990 to improve financial management and transparency in sports clubs. Many Spanish football and basketball clubs add the suffix S.A.D. to the end of their official name, for example Club Atlético de Madrid, S.A.D.

Every club which plays in La Liga, Segunda División or Liga ACB and remains in the league is obliged to convert to S.A.D. status. However, this obligation was eliminated in 2022.

For historical reasons, Athletic Club, FC Barcelona, Real Madrid and Osasuna were allowed to retain their status as non-commercial sports associations.

== See also ==
- List of football clubs in Spain
- Sociedade Anónima Desportiva
- Sociedade Anônima do Futebol
