= God Save the Queen (band) =

Argentine tribute band

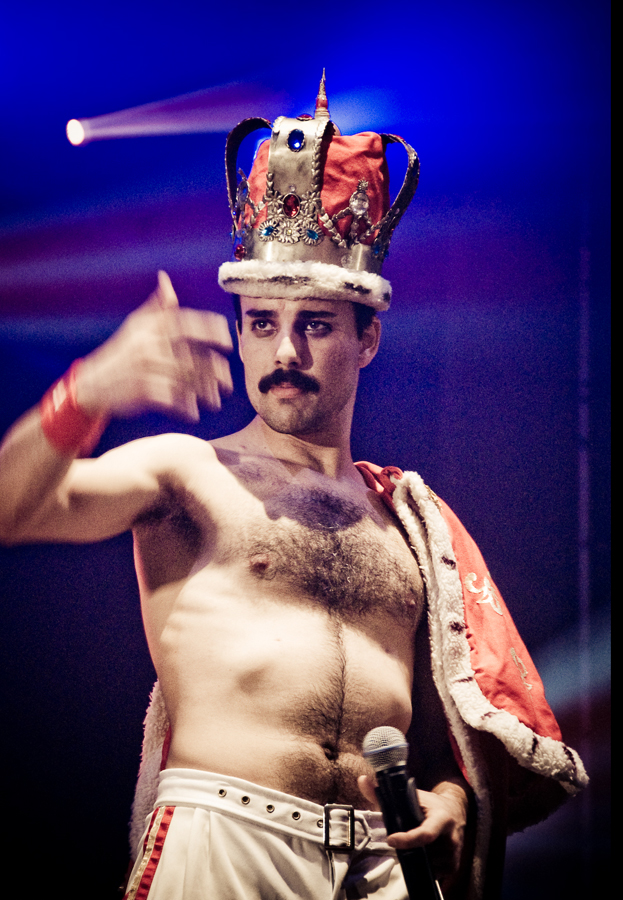
- Dios Salve a La Reina

Background information
- Years active: 1998 – present
- Members: Pablo Padin (vocals); Daniel Marcos (guitar); Matias Albornoz (drums); Ezequiel Tibaldo (bass)
- Website: www.dsr.com.ar

God Save the Queen (Spanish: Dios Salve a la Reina) is an Argentine Queen tribute-band formed in 1998. The band's members are: Pablo Padin (vocals), Francisco Calgaro (guitar), Matias Albornoz (drums) and Ezequiel Tibaldo (bass). The band takes their name from the United Kingdom's national anthem which was played on tape at the end of every Queen show while the band took their bows.

== Overview ==
God Save the Queen was formed in 1998, in the city of Rosario as Argentina's first four piece Queen tribute. The band's stage performance, including costumes and stage presence, resembles Queen's during the 1980s. The band has been noted for their faithful imitation of Queen in fashion and sound.

== Touring ==
Over the last five years, God Save the Queen has played in several big venues and arenas, including Luna Park Stadium in Buenos Aires and Montreux, Switzerland. In 2005, they took their act to the United Kingdom, Germany and India. During this tour, the band billed themselves as "Argentina's Greatest Tribute to Queen". When asked about their 2005 tour, drummer Matias Albornoz said, "I think it was a success, the music broke down the language barrier." In 2006, on the 25 year anniversary of Queen's first concert in Argentina, they performed using the precise setlist, clothing, and stage antics Queen used in 1981 (when members of the band saw Queen live at the same venue).
