= List of Spanish basketball champions =

- Founded: 1957; 69 years ago
- First season: 1957
- Country: Spain
- Other club from: Andorra
- Confederation: FIBA Europe
- Number of teams: 18
- Current champions: Valencia Basket (2nd title) (2025–26)
- Most championships: Real Madrid (38 titles)
- 2025–26 season

The Spanish basketball champions are the winners of the main basketball competition in Spain, which since 1983–84 is the Liga ACB. The league is contested on a round robin basis and the championship awarded to the team that is top of the league at the end of the season. The Liga Nacional, first established in 1957, originally contained six teams. Before the league, the Copa del Rey—a regionalised cup competition—was effectively the national championship. Nowadays, Liga ACB is contested by 18 teams; the two lowest-placed teams are relegated to the Primera FEB and replaced by the top two teams in that division. Of the founding teams in the league, only Joventut and Real Madrid have not been relegated.

Real Madrid is the most successful club with 38 titles, followed by Barcelona with 20 titles. The most recent club other than Real Madrid and Barcelona to win the league is Valencia Basket in the 2025–26 season. Real Madrid has won the Spanish version of the double the most times, having won the league and cup in the same year nineteen times in its history, 10 more than Barcelona's nine. Real Madrid has won the Triple Crown three times and Barcelona one time. The current champions are Valencia Basket, which won the 2025–26 competition.

== Champions ==
Key
*	Champions also won the Copa del Rey and FIBA European Champions Cup/EuroLeague that season
†	Champions also won the FIBA European Champions Cup/EuroLeague that season
‡	Champions also won the Copa del Rey that season

=== Liga Española de Baloncesto (1957–1983) ===
Season	Champions (number of titles)	Runners-up	Third	Fourth
1957	Real Madrid C.F. (1) ‡	C.F. Barcelona	Orillo Verde Sabadell	CB Aismalíbar
1958	Real Madrid C.F. (2)	Club Juventud Badalona	CB Aismalíbar	Orillo Verde Sabadell
1958–59	C.F. Barcelona (1) ‡	Real Madrid C.F.	Club Juventud Badalona	Orillo Verde Sabadell
1959–60	Real Madrid C.F. (3) ‡	Club Juventud Badalona	Orillo Verde Sabadell	CB Aismalíbar
1960–61	Real Madrid C.F. (4) ‡	Orillo Verde Sabadell	C.F. Barcelona	Club Juventud Badalona
1961–62	Real Madrid C.F. (5) ‡	Club Juventud Badalona	Estudiantes Madrid	CB Aismalíbar
1962–63	Real Madrid C.F. (6)	Estudiantes Madrid	Club Juventud Badalona	Picadero J.C. Barcelona
1963–64	Real Madrid C.F. (7) †	Picadero J.C. Barcelona	Club Juventud Badalona	CB Aismalíbar
1964–65	Real Madrid C.F. (8) *	Picadero J.C. Barcelona	Club Juventud Badalona	Estudiantes Madrid
1965–66	Real Madrid C.F. (9) ‡	Picadero J.C. Barcelona	C.D. Mataró	Club Juventud Badalona
1966–67	Club Juventud Badalona (1)	Real Madrid C.F.	Estudiantes Madrid	Picadero J.C. Barcelona
1967–68	Real Madrid C.F. (10) †	Estudiantes Madrid	Club Juventud Badalona	S.D. Kas Vitoria
1968–69	Real Madrid C.F. (11)	Club Juventud Badalona	Picadero J.C. Barcelona	S.D. Kas Bilbao
1969–70	Real Madrid C.F. (12) ‡	Picadero J.C. Barcelona	Club Juventud Badalona	S.D. Kas Bilbao
1970–71	Real Madrid C.F. (13) ‡	Club Juventud Badalona	Picadero J.C. Barcelona	C.D. Manresa
1971–72	Real Madrid C.F. (14) ‡	C.F. Barcelona	Club Juventud Badalona	Picadero J.C. Barcelona
1972–73	Real Madrid C.F. (15) ‡	Club Juventud Badalona	C.F. Barcelona	Estudiantes Madrid
1973–74	Real Madrid C.F. (16) *	C.F. Barcelona	Club Juventud Badalona	Estudiantes Madrid
1974–75	Real Madrid C.F. (17) ‡	F.C. Barcelona	Club Juventud Badalona	YMCA Madrid
1975–76	Real Madrid C.F. (18)	F.C. Barcelona	Club Juventud Badalona	Estudiantes Madrid
1976–77	Real Madrid C.F. (19) ‡	F.C. Barcelona	Club Juventud Badalona	U.D.R. Pineda
1977–78	Club Juventud Badalona (2)	Real Madrid C.F.	F.C. Barcelona	C.B. Círculo Católico Badalona
1978–79	Real Madrid C.F. (20)	F.C. Barcelona	Club Juventud Badalona	Estudiantes Madrid
1979–80	Real Madrid C.F. (21) †	F.C. Barcelona	Club Juventud Badalona	C.B. Círculo Católico Badalona
1980–81	F.C. Barcelona (2) ‡	Estudiantes Madrid	Real Madrid C.F.	C.B. Círculo Católico Badalona
1981–82	Real Madrid C.F. (22)	F.C. Barcelona	C.B. Círculo Católico Badalona	C.B. Valladolid
1982–83	F.C. Barcelona (3) ‡	Real Madrid C.F.	C.B. Granollers	C.B. Zaragoza

=== Liga ACB (1983–present) ===
Season	Champions (number of titles)	Runners-up
1983–84	Real Madrid (23)	FC Barcelona
1984–85	Real Madrid (24) ‡	Ron Negrita Joventut
1985–86	Real Madrid (25) ‡	FC Barcelona
1986–87	FC Barcelona (4) ‡	Ron Negrita Joventut
1987–88	FC Barcelona (5) ‡	Real Madrid
1988–89	FC Barcelona (6)	Real Madrid
1989–90	FC Barcelona (7)	RAM Joventut Badalona
1990–91	Montigalà Joventut (3)	FC Barcelona
1991–92	Montigalà Joventut (4)	Real Madrid Asegurator
1992–93	Real Madrid Teka (26) ‡	Marbella Joventut
1993–94	Real Madrid Teka (27)	FC Barcelona Banca Catalana
1994–95	FC Barcelona Banca Catalana (8)	Unicaja
1995–96	FC Barcelona Banca Catalana (9)	Caja San Fernando
1996–97	FC Barcelona Banca Catalana (10)	Real Madrid Teka
1997–98	TDK Manresa (1)	TAU Cerámica
1998–99	FC Barcelona (11)	Caja San Fernando
1999–00	Real Madrid Teka (28)	FC Barcelona
2000–01	FC Barcelona (12) ‡	Real Madrid
2001–02	TAU Cerámica (1) ‡	Unicaja
2002–03	FC Barcelona (13) *	Pamesa Valencia
2003–04	FC Barcelona (14)	Adecco Estudiantes
2004–05	Real Madrid (29)	TAU Cerámica
2005–06	Unicaja (1)	TAU Cerámica
2006–07	Real Madrid (30)	Winterthur FC Barcelona
2007–08	TAU Cerámica (2)	AXA FC Barcelona
2008–09	Regal FC Barcelona (15)	TAU Cerámica
2009–10	Caja Laboral (3)	Regal FC Barcelona
2010–11	Regal FC Barcelona (16) ‡	Bizkaia Bilbao Basket
2011–12	FC Barcelona Regal (17)	Real Madrid
2012–13	Real Madrid (31)	FC Barcelona Regal
2013–14	FC Barcelona (18)	Real Madrid
2014–15	Real Madrid (32) *	FC Barcelona
2015–16	Real Madrid (33) ‡	FC Barcelona Lassa
2016–17	Valencia Basket (1)	Real Madrid
2017–18	Real Madrid (34) †	Kirolbet Baskonia
2018–19	Real Madrid (35)	Barcelona Lassa
2019–20 (Note: The regular season was curtailed due to the COVID-19 pandemic, and the title was decided in an end-of-season tournament in Valencia.)	Kirolbet Baskonia (4)	Barcelona
2020–21	Barcelona (19) ‡	Real Madrid
2021–22	Real Madrid (36)	Barcelona
2022–23	Barcelona (20)	Real Madrid
2023–24	Real Madrid (37) ‡	UCAM Murcia
2024–25	Real Madrid (38)	Valencia Basket
2025–26	Valencia Basket (2)	Barcelona

== Total titles won ==
Clubs in bold are competing in the league as of the 2025–26 season.

Location of Spanish basketball champions

Club	Champions	Runners-up
**Real Madrid**	38	14
**Barcelona**	20	24
**Joventut**	4	10
**Baskonia**	4	5
**Valencia**	2	2
**Málaga**	1	2
**Manresa**	1	0
Picadero	0	4
Estudiantes	0	4
Real Betis	0	2
Orillo Verde	0	1
**Bilbao**	0	1
**UCAM Murcia**	0	1

Titles won by club (%)
1. Real Madrid – 38 (54.3%)
2. Barcelona – 20 (28.6%)
3. Joventut – 4 (5.71%)
4. Baskonia – 4 (5.71%)
5. Valencia - 2 (2.86%)
6. Other clubs - 2 (2.86%)

=== By city ===
City	Championships	Clubs
Madrid	38	Real Madrid (38)
Barcelona	20	Barcelona (20)
Badalona	4	Joventut (4)
Vitoria-Gasteiz	4	Baskonia (4)
Valencia	2	Valencia (2)
Manresa	1	Manresa (1)
Málaga	1	Málaga (1)

=== By Autonomous Community ===
Community	Championships	Clubs
Madrid	38	Real Madrid (38)
Catalonia	25	Barcelona (20), Joventut (4), Manresa (1)
Basque Country	4	Baskonia (4)
Valencia	2	Valencia (2)
Andalusia	1	Málaga (1)

== All-time table ==
The all-time table is an overall record of all match results of every team that has played since its inception in 1957. The table is accurate as of the end of the 2025–26 season.

Pos	Team	Season	Played	Won	Lost	Drawn	1st	2nd	3rd	4th	Debut	Since/Last App	Best
1	Real Madrid	70	2362	1866	490	6	38	14	7	2	1957	1957	1
2	Barcelona	68	2347	1717	624	6	20	24	8	2	1957	1965–66	1
3	Joventut	70	2193	1323	855	15	4	10	20	7	1957	1957	1
4	Baskonia	53	1912	1129	777	6	4	5	5	6	1972–73	1982–83	1
5	Estudiantes	65	1991	1020	953	18	–	4	7	12	1957	2020–21	2
6	Málaga (Note: Includes CB Caja de Ronda results)	43	1606	901	704	1	1	2	6	7	1981–82	1987–88	1
7	Valencia	37	1410	829	581	–	2	2	4	3	1988–89	1996–97	1
8	Manresa	52	1683	718	955	10	1	–	–	3	1968–69	2018–19	1
9	Gran Canaria	35	1269	607	662	–	–	–	–	2	1985–86	1995–96	4
10	Real Betis	33	1171	515	656	–	–	2	–	–	1989–90	2022–23	2
11	Valladolid	35	1154	492	660	2	–	–	–	1	1976–77	2013–14	4
12	Murcia	28	981	385	596	–	–	1	–	–	1990–91	2011–12	2
13	Canarias (Note: Includes old CB Canarias results)	22	772	380	390	2	–	–	2	1	1981–82	2012–13	3
14	Breogán	29	964	365	598	1	–	–	–	–	1970–71	2021–22	6
15	CB Girona	20	731	330	401	–	–	–	–	–	1988–89	2007–08	5
16	Bilbao	21	729	326	403	–	–	1	–	–	2004–05	2019–20	2
17	Fuenlabrada	25	852	324	528	–	–	–	–	–	1996–97	2022–23	7
18	CB Zaragoza	15	525	301	223	1	–	–	2	4	1981–82	1995–96	3
19	Basket Zaragoza	17	583	242	341	–	–	–	1	1	2008–09	2010–11	3
20	Granollers	16	496	230	258	8	–	–	1	–	1977–78	1992–93	3
21	Andorra	15	521	223	298	–	–	–	–	–	1992–93	2023–24	6
22	Círcol Catòlic	13	345	181	157	7	–	–	1	4	1973–74	1985–86	3
23	León	11	398	179	219	–	–	–	–	–	1990–91	2007–08	6
24	Obradoiro	15	493	173	320	–	–	–	–	–	1982–83	2023–24	8
25	Peñas	12	441	173	268	–	–	–	–	–	1983–84	1995–96	10
26	OAR Ferrol	13	428	169	256	3	–	–	–	–	1980–81	1993–94	7
27	Cáceres	11	388	163	225	–	–	–	–	–	1992–93	2002–03	5
28	Picadero	12	246	156	86	4	–	4	2	4	1961–62	1972–73	2
29	Ourense	10	383	143	240	–	–	–	–	–	1989–90	2000–01	8
30	CB Granada	12	411	140	271	–	–	–	–	–	1996–97	2010–11	10
31	Gipuzkoa	12	411	135	276	–	–	–	–	–	2006–07	2020–21	5
32	Lucentum	9	316	132	184	–	–	–	–	–	2000–01	2011–12	6
33	Espanyol	11	289	115	172	2	–	–	–	–	1958	1988–89	5
34	Tenerife AB (Note: Includes RC Náutico de Tenerife results)	13	359	108	247	4	–	–	–	–	1966–67	1989–90	7
35	Kas	8	186	101	84	1	–	–	–	3	1966–67	1973–74	4
36	Mataró	12	252	95	153	4	–	–	1	–	1963–64	1977–78	3
37	Collado Villalba	6	226	93	133	–	–	–	–	–	1984–85	1991–92	8
38	Águilas	14	294	91	202	1	–	–	–	–	1958–59	1975–76	6
39	San Pablo Burgos	6	203	87	116	–	–	–	–	1	2017–18	2025–26	4
40	Aismalíbar	8	144	87	54	3	–	–	1	3	1957	1963–64	3
41	Oximesa	6	225	82	143	–	–	–	–	–	1986–87	1991–92	11
42	Cajabilbao	5	184	76	108	–	–	–	–	–	1986–87	1990–91	9
43	Maristas Málaga	4	160	76	84	–	–	–	–	–	1988–89	1991–92	13
44	Pineda de Mar	8	200	75	122	3	–	–	–	1	1971–72	1978–79	4
45	L'Hospitalet	8	193	63	126	4	–	–	–	–	1965–66	1983–84	7
46	Orillo Verde	5	94	63	31	–	–	1	2	2	1957	1960–61	2
47	Lleida	4	140	57	83	–	–	–	–	–	2001–02	2004–05	8
48	San José Irpen	6	146	56	85	5	–	–	–	–	1968–69	1973–74	7
49	Cantabria	5	170	53	117	–	–	–	–	–	1997–98	2001–02	14
50	Menorca	5	168	51	117	–	–	–	–	–	2005–06	2011–12	15
51	Bàsquet Girona	4	136	50	86	–	–	–	–	–	2022–23	2022–23	12
52	Cajamadrid	3	98	46	52	–	–	–	–	–	1983–84	1985–86	5
53	Inmobanco	4	96	40	53	3	–	–	–	–	1978–79	1982–83	5
54	Gijón	4	144	37	107	–	–	–	–	–	1995–96	2001–02	15
55	Fundación Granada	4	136	37	99	–	–	–	–	–	2022–23	2022–23	15
56	Helios	7	134	37	93	4	–	–	–	–	1959–60	1980–81	6
57	Salamanca	2	76	36	40	–	–	–	–	–	1994–95	1995–96	9
58	Canoe NC	8	138	33	103	2	–	–	–	–	1958	1964–65	8
59	Askatuak	4	109	30	76	3	–	–	–	–	1976–77	1988–89	5
60	Hesperia	3	62	28	32	2	–	–	–	–	1958	1959–60	5
61	Vallehermoso	4	100	27	71	2	–	–	–	–	1967–68	1973–74	9
62	Iberia	4	84	27	56	1	–	–	–	–	1958–59	1961–62	7
63	Llíria	2	79	27	52	–	–	–	–	–	1991–92	1992–93	16
64	Tenerife	2	68	25	43	–	–	–	–	–	2003–04	2004–05	10
65	Força Lleida	2	68	23	45	–	–	–	–	–	2024–25	2024–25	14
66	Atlético San Sebastián	3	64	23	41	–	–	–	–	–	1967–68	1969–70	5
67	YMCA España	2	50	22	27	1	–	–	–	1	1973–74	1974–75	4
68	Montgat	4	66	19	47	–	–	–	–	–	1959–60	1963–64	7
69	Ciudad de Huelva	1	39	11	28	–	–	–	–	–	1997–98	1997–98	17
70	Laietà	3	40	10	30	–	–	–	–	–	1958	1963–64	7
71	Agromán	3	40	10	30	–	–	–	–	–	1961–62	1963–64	8
72	Sevilla FC	2	30	10	20	–	–	–	–	–	1963–64	1965–66	8
73	CB Manresa	1	30	9	20	1	–	–	–	–	1972–73	1972–73	15
74	Coruña	1	34	7	27	–	–	–	–	–	2024–25	2024–25	18
75	Mollet	2	44	6	36	2	–	–	–	–	1978–79	1979–80	10
76	Palencia	1	34	6	28	–	–	–	–	–	2023–24	2023–24	18
77	Bosco	1	22	6	15	1	–	–	–	–	1968–69	1968–69	12
78	Tritones	1	10	5	5	–	–	–	–	–	1962–63	1962–63	6
79	La Salle Josepets	1	22	4	16	2	–	–	–	–	1958–59	1958–59	10
80	La Salle Barcelona	1	26	3	23	–	–	–	–	–	1981–82	1981–82	13
81	Real Zaragoza	1	22	2	19	1	–	–	–	–	1960–61	1960–61	11

League or status at 2025–26 season:

2025–26 ACB season
2025–26 Primera FEB
2025–26 Segunda FEB
2025–26 Tercera FEB
Lower divisions
Clubs that no longer exist

== Clubs in international competitions ==
	Tier 1			Tier 2						Tier 3								
	EuroLeague (1958–)			EuroCup (2002–)			Saporta Cup (1966–2002)			Champions League (2016–)			EuroChallenge (2003–2015)			Korać Cup (1971–2002)		
	C	RU	SF	C	RU	SF	C	RU	SF	C	RU	SF	C	RU	SF	C	RU	SF
Real Madrid	11	10	14	1	1		4	2								1	1	
Barcelona	2	6	9				2	1	3							2	1	3
Joventut	1	1		1		1		1	5				1			2		3
Baskonia		2	3				1	2										
Málaga			1	1												1	1	
Estudiantes			1			2			2						1		1	1
Valencia				4	2	2		2	1									
Bilbao					1	2												
Gran Canaria					1	2												
Girona					1								1					1
Real Betis					1													
Andorra						1												
Zaragoza								1	2			2						2
Miraflores										2								
Canarias										1	1							
Murcia												1						
Picadero																		2
Círculo Católico																		1
Valladolid																		1
Cáceres																1		
