= Vladimir Tkachenko =

Soviet And Russian Professional Basketball player

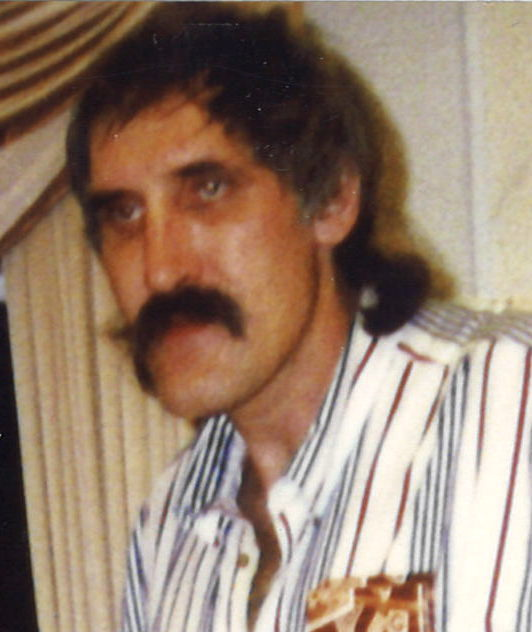

Personal information
- Born: 20 September 1957 (age 69) Sochi, Russian SFSR, Soviet Union
- Listed height: 220 cm (7 ft 3 in)
- Listed weight: 110 kg (243 lb)

Career information
- Playing career: 1974–1991
- Position: Center
- Number: 11

Career history
- 1974–1982: Stroitel
- 1983–1990: CSKA Moscow
- 1990-1991: Guadalajara

Career highlights
- Euroscar (1979); Mr. Europa (1979); 2× FIBA European Selection (1979, 1982); 4× USSR League champion (1983, 1984, 1988, 1990); Master of Sports of the USSR (1979); Order of the Badge of Honour (USSR) (1985); FIBA All-Time EuroStars Team (2007)
- FIBA Hall of Fame
Medals
Men's basketball
Representing Soviet Union
Olympic Games
| Bronze medal – third place | 1976 Montreal |
| Bronze medal – third place | 1980 Moscow |
FIBA World Cup
| Silver medal – second place | 1978 Philippines |
| Gold medal – first place | 1982 Colombia |
| Silver medal – second place | 1986 Spain |
FIBA EuroBasket
| Silver medal – second place | 1977 Belgium |
| Gold medal – first place | 1979 Italy |
| Gold medal – first place | 1981 Czechoslovakia |
| Gold medal – first place | 1985 West Germany |
| Silver medal – second place | 1987 Greece |
European U-18 Championship
| Silver medal – second place | 1976 Spain | Under-18 |
European Championship for Cadets
| Gold medal – first place | 1973 Italy | Under-16 |

Vladimir Petrovich Tkachenko (alternative spelling: Vladimir Tkatchenko) (Russian: Владимир Петрович Ткаченко; born 20 September 1957) is a retired Soviet and Russian professional basketball player. Tkachenko won two Summer Olympic Games medals and three FIBA World Cup medals with the senior men's Soviet Union national team. He was also named both the Euroscar and the Mr. Europa in 1979. His pro club career lasted 17 years. Standing at 220 cm, he played as a center.

He was named to the FIBA All-Time EuroStars Team in 2007. He became a FIBA Hall of Fame player in 2015.

== Professional career ==
Tkachenko began playing with Stroitel of the USSR Premiere League, during the 1973–74 season, when he was 16 years old. He continued to play for them through the 1981–82 season. In 1983, he began playing for the USSR League club CSKA Moscow, and he stayed there through the 1989–90 season. He finished his club career in the former Spanish 2nd division, with Guadalajara, in the 1990–91 season.

== National team career ==
From 1976 to 1987, Tkachenko played on the senior men's Soviet Union national team, participating in many FIBA EuroBasket and FIBA World Cup competitions. With the Soviet national team, he won numerous medals, including: two bronze medals, at the 1976 Summer Olympic Games and at the 1980 Summer Olympic Games, the gold medal at the 1982 FIBA World Championship (also silver medals at the 1978 FIBA World Championship and the 1986 FIBA World Championship); as well as three gold medals at the FIBA EuroBasket: at the FIBA EuroBasket 1979, the FIBA EuroBasket 1981, and the FIBA EuroBasket 1985 (also silvers at the FIBA EuroBasket 1977 and the FIBA EuroBasket 1987).

== Player profile ==
Tkachenko, a 7 ft 3 in (2.21 m), 243 lb (110 kg) center, was a great defensive player. He could block out 2-3 opponents to give teammates a chance to grab a rebound. His offensive ability was important too, as his post up moves were basic, but effective, and his shooting was good for a player of his size, with a range of approximately 17 feet.
