= 1990–91 Primera División de Baloncesto =

The 1990–91 Primera División season was the second category of the Spanish basketball league system during the 1990–91 season. It was the second played with the name of Primera División.

== Format ==
16 teams played this season.

- Regular Season
  - League of 16 teams in a single group where they play all against all in two rounds.
- Second Phase
  - Group A1, made up of those classified in 1st, 4th, 5th and 8th positions.
  - Group A2, made up of those classified in the 2nd, 3rd, 6th and 7th positions.
  - Group B1, made up of those classified in positions 9th, 12th, 13th and 16th.
  - Group B2, made up of those classified in the 10th, 11th, 14th and 15th positions.
- Promotion playoffs
  - The first 3 of groups A1 and A2; plus the champions of groups B1 and B2 play two rounds of knockout rounds for promotion. The first round is the best of 3 matches (first and third matches are played at the home of the best classified in the regular season) and the second to the best of 5 (first, third and fifth matches are played at the home of the best classified in the regular season). The two winners go up to the ACB League.
- Relegation playoffs
  - The last of groups A1 and A2 together with the 2nd classified of groups B1 and B2 play an intermediate tie to the best of 3 games (first and third matches are played at the home of the best classified in the regular season). The winners keep the category, while the losers have to play another round to decide who goes down.
  - The last 2 classifieds in groups B1 and B2 play a best of 3 games. The losers go down to the 'Segunda División' and the winners have to play one more tie against the losers of the intermediate to the best of 5 games (first, third and fifth games are played at the home of the best classified in the regular season). The winners keep the category.

== Teams ==
=== Promotion and relegation (pre-season) ===
A total of 16 teams contested the league, including 10 sides from the 1989–90 season, two relegated from the 1989–90 ACB and four promoted from the Segunda División. CAB Obradoiro was not admitted by the FEB and was replaced by Loyola Easo, who obtained a relegation place the previous season.

Teams relegated from Liga ACB

- Gran Canaria
- Tenerife AB

Teams promoted from Segunda División

- CB Azuqueca
- Digsa Loja
- Santa Coloma
- CAB Cartagena

=== Venues and locations ===
Location of teams in 1990–91 1ªDivisión
Location of teams from the Canary Islands in 1990–91 1ªDivisión
Location of teams from the Guadalajara Region in 1990–91 1ªDivisión

Team	Home city
BC Andorra	Andorra la Vella
CAB Cartagena	Cartagena
Caja Badajoz	Badajoz
CB Azuqueca	Azuqueca de Henares
CB Guadalajara	Guadalajara
CB Llíria	Llíria
CD Cajamadrid	Alcalá de Henares
Cirsa Hospitalet	Hospitalet de Llobregat
Digsa Loja	Loja
ElMonte Huelva	Huelva
Gran Canaria	Las Palmas
Lagisa Gijón	Gijón
Loyola Easo	San Sebastián
Prohaci Mallorca	Palma de Mallorca
Santa Coloma	Santa Coloma de Gramenet
Tenerife AB	Santa Cruz de Tenerife

== Regular season ==
Pos	Team	Pld	W	L	PF	PA	PD	Pts	Qualification or relegation
1	Gran Canaria	30	22	8	2295	2101	+194	52	Qualification to A1
2	CB Llíria	30	18	12	2311	2294	+17	48	Qualification to A2
3	Prohaci Mallorca	30	18	12	2501	2391	+110	48	Qualification to A2
4	CB Guadalajara	30	18	12	2314	2226	+88	48	Qualification to A1
5	CD Cajamadrid	30	18	12	2326	2244	+82	48	Qualification to A1
6	BC Andorra	30	18	12	2604	2461	+143	48	Qualification to A2
7	Loyola Easo	30	17	13	2392	2331	+61	47	Qualification to A2
8	ElMonte Huelva	30	15	15	2453	2471	−18	45	Qualification to A1
9	Caja Badajoz	30	15	15	2433	2374	+59	45	Qualification to B1
10	Lagisa Gijón	30	15	15	2433	2374	+59	45	Qualification to B2
11	Santa Coloma	30	12	18	2272	2301	−29	42	Qualification to B2
12	CAB Cartagena	30	11	19	2272	2413	−141	41	Qualification to B1
13	Tenerife AB	30	11	19	2443	2580	−137	41	Qualification to B1
14	Cirsa Hospitalet	30	11	19	2357	2497	−140	41	Qualification to B2
15	Digsa Loja	30	11	19	2315	2499	−184	41	Qualification to B2
16	CB Azuqueca	30	10	20	2307	2401	−94	40	Qualification to B1

Source: League at JM Almenzar website

== Second Phase ==
=== Group A1 ===
Pos	Team	Pld	W	L	PF	PA	PD	Pts	Qualification or relegation
1	Gran Canaria	6	4	2	489	439	+50	10	Qualification to Promotion playoffs
2	CD Cajamadrid	6	4	2	463	446	+17	10	Qualification to Promotion playoffs
3	ElMonte Huelva	6	4	2	467	469	−2	10	Qualification to Promotion playoffs
4	CB Guadalajara	6	0	6	454	478	−24	6	Qualification to Intermediate playoff

Source: hispaligas.net

=== Group A2 ===
Pos	Team	Pld	W	L	PF	PA	PD	Pts	Qualification or relegation
1	Prohaci Mallorca	6	5	1	527	492	+35	11	Qualification to Promotion playoffs
2	BC Andorra	6	3	3	487	476	+11	9	Qualification to Promotion playoffs
3	CB Llíria	6	2	4	478	486	−8	8	Qualification to Promotion playoffs
4	Loyola Easo	6	2	4	452	490	−38	8	Qualification to Intermediate playoff

Source: League at JM Almenzar website

=== Group B1 ===
Pos	Team	Pld	W	L	PF	PA	PD	Pts	Qualification or relegation
1	Caja Badajoz	6	4	2	479	451	+28	10	Qualification to Promotion playoffs
2	Tenerife AB	6	4	2	546	476	+70	10	Qualification to Intermediate playoff
3	CAB Cartagena	6	3	3	505	469	+36	9	Qualification to Relegation playoffs
4	CB Azuqueca	6	1	5	483	529	−46	7	Qualification to Relegation playoffs

Source: League at JM Almenzar website

=== Group B2 ===
Pos	Team	Pld	W	L	PF	PA	PD	Pts	Qualification or relegation
1	Lagisa Gijón	6	4	2	433	437	−4	10	Qualification to Promotion playoffs
2	Cirsa Hospitalet	6	4	2	461	443	+18	10	Qualification to Intermediate playoff
3	Digsa Loja	6	2	4	484	481	+3	8	Qualification to Relegation playoffs
4	Santa Coloma	6	2	4	434	460	−26	8	Qualification to Relegation playoffs

Source: League at JM Almenzar website

== PlayOffs ==
=== Promotion playoffs ===
Semifinal winners are promoted to Liga ACB.

Quarterfinals
A1-1 Gran Canaria	63	65	85
B2-1 Lagisa Gijón	53	69	74
A2-2 BC Andorra	87	84
A1-3 ElMonte Huelva	66	74
A2-3 CB Llíria	69	72	97
A1-2 CD Cajamadrid	66	81	85
A2-1 Prohaci Mallorca	106	103
B1-1 Caja Badajoz	99	86

Semifinals
A1-1 Gran Canaria	87	81
A2-2 BC Andorra	87	62
A2-3 CB Llíria	84	89	92
A2-1 Prohaci Mallorca	71	86	84

Promoted to Liga ACB
A1-1 Gran Canaria
A2-3 CB Llíria

=== Intermediate playoff ===
Winners remain in the category next season and the losers play the second round of the relegation play-off.

Team 1	Series	Team 2	Game 1	Game 2	Game 3
CB Guadalajara	2–1	Cirsa Hospitalet	76–71	82–89	82–72
Loyola Easo	2–0	Tenerife AB	87–80	97–79	

=== Relegation playoffs ===
==== First Round ====
Team 1	Series	Team 2	Game 1	Game 2	Game 3
Santa Coloma	1–2	CAB Cartagena	77–70	69–75	73–78
Digsa Loja	2–0	CB Azuqueca	78–76	78–69	

==== Second Round ====
Team 1	Series	Team 2	Game 1	Game 2	Game 3	Game 4	Game 5
Cirsa Hospitalet	3–2	Digsa Loja	103–89	70–71	84–78	81–87	95–83
CAB Cartagena	3–2	Tenerife AB	86–68	75–89	86–74	68–75	85–72

== Final standings ==
Pos	Team	Pld	W	L	Qualification or relegation
1	Gran Canaria (P)	42	31	11	Promoted to ACB
2	CB Llíria (P)	42	25	17	Promoted to ACB
3	Prohaci Mallorca	42	25	17	
4	BC Andorra	41	23	18	
5	CD Cajamadrid	39	23	16	Resigned to participate next season
6	ElMonte Huelva	38	19	19	
7	Caja Badajoz	39	20	19	
8	Lagisa Gijón	39	20	19	
9	CB Guadalajara	39	20	19	
10	Loyola Easo	38	21	17	
11	CAB Cartagena	44	19	25	Resigned to participate next season
12	Cirsa Hospitalet	44	19	25	
13	Tenerife AB (R)	43	17	26	Relegation to Segunda División
14	Digsa Loja (R)	34	14	20	Relegation to Segunda División
15	Santa Coloma	39	15	24	Relegation to Segunda División
16	CB Azuqueca (R)	38	11	27	Relegation to Segunda División

Source: hispaligas.net
(P) Promoted; (R) Relegated
