= José Luis Llorente =

Spanish basketball player

José Luis Llorente Gento (born 6 January 1959 in Valladolid, Spain) is a Spanish retired basketball player. He played 112 matches for the Spain national team.

== Clubs ==
- 1979-83: Real Madrid
- 1983-85: Cajamadrid
- 1985-87: CB Zaragoza
- 1987-92: Real Madrid
- 1992-96: BC Andorra
- 1996-97: Baloncesto Fuenlabrada

== Awards ==
- Liga ACB (2): 1979-80, 1981–82
- Copa del Rey (1): 1988-89
- Euroleague (1): 1979-80
- Intercontinental Cup (1): 1981
- Korać Cup (1): 1987-88
- Saporta Cup (2): 1988-89, 1991–92
- Summer Olympics - Silver Medal 1984
