= 1984–85 Primera División B de Baloncesto =

The 1984–85 Primera División B was the second category of the Spanish basketball league system during the 1984–85 season

== Format ==
14 teams played this season.

- League of 14 teams, the first three are promoted to the Liga ACB, the last four are relegated to the Second Division.

== Teams ==
=== Promotion and relegation (pre-season) ===
A total of 14 teams contested the league, including 6 sides from the 1983–84 season, three relegated from the 1983–84 ACB, four promoted from the Segunda División and one Wild Cards.

Teams relegated from Liga ACB

- Peñas Huesca
- Hospitalet ATO
- EB Manresa

Teams promoted from Segunda División

- CB Tizona
- Claret Mútua Guanarteme
- Caja Guadalajara
- Caja Bilbao

Wild Cards

- Maristas de Málaga

Teams that resigned to participate

- UER Pineda

=== Venues and locations ===
Location of teams in 1984–85 1ªDivisión B
Location of teams from the Canary Islands in 1984–85 1ªDivisión B

Team	Home city
Caja Bilbao	Bilbao
Caja Guadalajara	Guadalajara
Canoe NC	Madrid
CB Tizona	Burgos
Claret Mútua Guanarteme	Las Palmas
CD Oximesa	Albolote
EB Manresa	Manresa
Hospitalet ATO	Hospitalet de Llobregat
Kanterbrau Dribling	Madrid
Llíria Seguros Mediodía	Llíria
Maristas de Málaga	Málaga
Peñas Huesca	Huesca
RC Naútico	Santa Cruz de Tenerife
Trébol Gijón	Gijón

== Regular season ==
Pos	Team	Pld	W	L	PF	PA	PD	Pts	Qualification or relegation
1	Peñas Huesca (P)	26	19	7	2054	1883	+171	45	Promoted to ACB
2	Claret Mútua Guanarteme (P)	26	19	7	2089	2032	+57	45	Promoted to ACB
3	EB Manresa (P)	26	17	9	2117	2079	+38	43	Promoted to ACB
4	Caja Bilbao	26	17	9	2233	2082	+151	43	
5	CD Oximesa	26	14	12	2083	2044	+39	40	
6	Hospitalet ATO	26	14	12	1967	1975	−8	40	
7	RC Naútico	26	13	13	2027	2010	+17	39	
8	Canoe NC	26	12	14	1910	1962	−52	38	
9	Kanterbrau Dribling	26	12	14	2108	2144	−36	38	
10	Trébol Gijón	26	12	14	2081	2114	−33	38	
11	Llíria Seguros Mediodía	26	11	15	1970	1943	+27	37	Relegated to 2ª División
12	CB Tizona	26	9	17	2064	2089	−25	35	Relegated to 2ª División
13	Caja Guadalajara (R)	26	7	19	2024	2164	−140	33	Relegated to 2ª División
14	Maristas de Málaga (R)	26	6	20	1954	2160	−206	32	Relegated to 2ª División

Source: JM Almenzar Website
(P) Promoted; (R) Relegated
