= 1989–90 Primera División de Baloncesto =

Spanish basketball league season

The 1989–90 Primera División season was the second category of the Spanish basketball league system during the 1989–90 season. It was the second played with the name of Primera División.

== Format ==
16 teams played this season.

- Regular Season
  - League of 16 teams in a single group where they play all against all in two rounds.
  - The last two teams are relegated to Segunda Division.
- Promotion playoffs
  - The top 8 play two knockout rounds for promotion. The first round is the best of 3 matches (first and third matches are played at the home of the best classified in the previous phase) and the second to the best of 5 (first, third and fifth matches are played at the home of the best classified in the phase previous). The two winners go up to the ACB League.
- Relegation playoffs
  - Those classified between the 11th to 14th places play a best of 5 matches (first, third and fifth matches are played at the home of the best classified in the previous phase), the 2 losers go down to Segunda Division.

== Teams ==
=== Promotion and relegation (pre-season) ===
A total of 16 teams contested the league, including 10 sides from the 1988–89 season, one relegated from the 1988–89 ACB, three promoted from the Segunda División and two Wild Cards.

Teams relegated from Liga ACB

- CB Askatuak

Teams promoted from Segunda División

- Choleck Llíria
- Cirsa Hospitalet
- CB Argaray

Wild Cards

- Cajahuelva, who obtained a relegation place the previous season.
- CB Las Rozas

Teams that resigned to participate

- CB Oviedo sold his place to Atlético de Madrid

=== Venues and locations ===
Location of teams in 1989–90 1ªDivisión
Location of teams in 1989–90 1ªDivisión (Community of Madrid)

Team	Home city
Atlético de Madrid	Madrid
BC Andorra	Andorra la Vella
CAB Obradoiro	Santiago de Compostela
Cajahuelva	Huelva
Caja Badajoz	Badajoz
CB Argaray	Pamplona
CB Askatuak	San Sebastián
CB Guadalajara	Guadalajara
CB Las Rozas	Las Rozas
CD Cajamadrid	Alcalá de Henares
Choleck Llíria	Llíria
Cirsa Hospitalet	Hospitalet de Llobregat
Elosúa León	León
Lagisa Gijón	Gijón
Júver Murcia	Murcia
Syrius Patronato	Palma de Mallorca

== Regular season ==
Pos	Team	Pld	W	L	PF	PA	PD	Pts	Qualification or relegation
1	CD Cajamadrid	30	23	7	2493	2288	+205	53	Qualification to Promotion
2	Júver Murcia	30	22	8	2631	2349	+282	52	Qualification to Promotion
3	CAB Obradoiro	30	19	11	2558	2340	+218	49	Qualification to Promotion
4	Elosúa León	30	19	11	2534	2431	+103	49	Qualification to Promotion
5	BC Andorra	30	18	12	2543	2488	+55	48	Qualification to Promotion
6	Cajahuelva	30	18	12	2566	2539	+27	48	Qualification to Promotion
7	Syrius Patronato	30	18	12	2552	2437	+115	48	Qualification to Promotion
8	Choleck Llíria	30	17	13	2520	2459	+61	47	Qualification to Promotion
9	CB Guadalajara	30	15	15	2616	2553	+63	45	
10	Caja Badajoz	30	14	16	2489	2494	−5	44	
11	Cirsa Hospitalet	30	13	17	2661	2615	+46	43	Qualification to Relegation
12	Atlético de Madrid	30	13	17	2470	2564	−94	43	Qualification to Relegation
13	Lagisa Gijón	30	11	19	2410	2437	−27	41	Qualification to Relegation
14	CB Askatuak	30	11	19	2458	2621	−163	41	Qualification to Relegation
15	CB Las Rozas	30	6	24	2441	2770	−329	36	Relegation to Segunda División
16	CB Argaray	30	3	27	2497	2942	−445	33	Relegation to Segunda División

Source: hispaligas.net

== PlayOffs ==
=== Promotion playoffs ===
Semifinal winners are promoted to Liga ACB.

Quarterfinals
1 CD Cajamadrid	69	70
8 Choleck Llíria	82	72
4 Elosúa León	87	81	89
5 BC Andorra	94	73	87
2 Júver Murcia	82	103
7 Syrius Patronato	72	86
3 CAB Obradoiro	82	71	69
6 Cajahuelva	73	74	59

Semifinals
8 Choleck Llíria	80	80	75
4 Elosúa León	81	83	82
2 Júver Murcia	90	93	89
3 CAB Obradoiro	86	87	80

Promoted to Liga ACB
4 Elosúa León
2 Júver Murcia

=== Relegation playoffs ===
Team 1	Series	Team 2	Game 1	Game 2	Game 3	Game 4	Game 5
Cirsa Hospitalet	3–2	CB Askatuak	103–88	76–94	73–78	89–73	85–77
Atlético de Madrid	1–3	Lagisa Gijón	65–68	79–71	68–76	74–79	

== Final standings ==
Pos	Team	Pld	W	L	Qualification or relegation
1	Júver Murcia (P)	35	27	8	Promoted to ACB
2	Elosúa León (P)	36	24	12	Promoted to ACB
3	CAB Obradoiro	36	21	15	Excluded for the following season
4	Choleck Llíria	35	19	16	
5	CD Cajamadrid	32	23	9	
6	BC Andorra	33	19	14	
7	Cajahuelva	33	19	14	
8	Syrius Patronato	32	18	14	
9	CB Guadalajara	30	15	15	
10	Caja Badajoz	30	14	16	
11	Cirsa Hospitalet	35	16	19	
12	Lagisa Gijón	34	14	20	
13	Atlético de Madrid (R)	34	14	20	Relegation to Segunda División
14	CB Askatuak	35	13	22	Relegation to Segunda División
15	CB Las Rozas (R)	30	6	24	Relegation to Segunda División
16	CB Argaray (R)	30	3	27	Relegation to Segunda División

Source: hispaligas.net
(P) Promoted; (R) Relegated
