= 1983–84 Primera División B de Baloncesto =

Spanish basketball league system category

The 1983–84 Primera División B was the second category of the Spanish basketball league system during the 1983–84 season

== Format ==
14 teams played this season.

- 14 teams in a round-robin format, the first three are promoted to the Liga ACB, the last four are relegated to Segunda División.
- Ties are eliminated.
- In case of tie at the end of the game, extensions will be played until one team wins.
- Victory is worth 2 points and defeat 1

== Teams ==
=== Promotion and relegation (pre-season) ===
A total of 14 teams contested the league, including 6 sides from the 1982–83 season, one relegated from the 1982–83 Liga Española de Baloncesto, four promoted from the Segunda División and three Wild Cards.

Teams relegated from Liga Española de Baloncesto

- Obradoiro Feiraco

Teams promoted from Segunda División

- Kanterbrau Dribling
- CD Oximesa
- CB Llíria
- Iveco Gijón

Wild Cards

- AB Premià
- Breogán Caixa Galicia
- CB Gasteiz

Teams that resigned to participate

- CD Fortuna sold his place to Atlético de Madrid

=== Venues and locations ===
Location of teams in 1983–84 1ªDivisión B
Location of teams from the Canary Islands in 1983–84 1ªDivisión B

Team	Home city
AB Premià	Premià de Mar
Atlético de Madrid	Madrid
Breogán Caixa Galicia	Lugo
Canoe NC	Madrid
CB Bosco	La Coruña
CB Gasteiz	Vitoria-Gasteiz
CB Llíria	Llíria
CD Oximesa	Albolote
Iveco Gijón	Gijón
Kanterbrau Dribling	Madrid
Obradoiro Feiraco	Santiago de Compostela
RC Naútico	Santa Cruz de Tenerife
RCD Español	Barcelona
UER Pineda	Pineda de Mar

== Regular season ==
Pos	Team	Pld	W	L	PF	PA	PD	Pts	Qualification or relegation
1	RCD Español (P)	26	21	5	2200	1938	+262	47	Promoted to ACB
2	Breogán Caixa Galicia (P)	26	18	8	2314	2175	+139	44	Promoted to ACB
3	Atlético de Madrid (P)	26	17	9	2251	2095	+156	43	Promoted to ACB
4	CD Oximesa	26	15	11	2209	2102	+107	41	
5	Canoe NC	26	14	12	2146	2176	−30	40	
6	RC Naútico	26	13	13	2109	1992	+117	39	
7	Iveco Gijón	26	13	13	2129	2079	+50	39	
8	UER Pineda	26	13	13	2089	2086	+3	39	Resigned to participate next season
9	Kanterbrau Dribling	26	12	14	2097	2182	−85	38	
10	Llíria Seguros Mediodía	26	11	15	2157	2189	−32	37	
11	AB Premià (R)	26	10	16	2036	2172	−136	36	Relegated to 2ª División
12	Obradoiro Feiraco (R)	26	9	17	1935	2104	−169	35	Relegated to 2ª División
13	CB Bosco (R)	26	8	18	2093	2148	−55	34	Relegated to 2ª División
14	CB Gasteiz (R)	26	8	18	2086	2316	−230	34	Relegated to 2ª División

Source: JM Almenzar Website
(P) Promoted; (R) Relegated
