= 1983–84 ACB season =

ACB Primera División
- Season: 1983–84
- Games played: 259
- Teams: 16

Regular season
- Relegated: Peñas Recreativas Huesca; Hospitalet ATO; Ebro Manresa

Finals
- Champions: Real Madrid; 1st ACB title 23rd Spanish title
- Runners-up: FC Barcelona
- Semi-finalists: Joventut Massana; CAI Zaragoza

The 1983–84 ACB season was the inaugural season of the ACB Primera División, the top Spanish professional basketball league. It started on 10 September 1983 with the first round of the regular season and ended on 13 April 1984 with the finals. The league was made up of the clubs that broke away from Spanish Basketball Federation at the end of the 1982–83 season with the aim to professionalize the league. The new league introduced the best-of-three playoffs at the end of the regular season just like in the Italian league.

Real Madrid won their first ACB title, and their 23rd Spanish title after the decision of the Competition Committee, when FC Barcelona didn't appear in the third game of the finals in protest of what it considered an unfair decision by this body following a fight between players in the second game of the finals: Davis was sanctioned for six games due to attack Real Madrid player Iturriaga, who had previously elbowed him in a block.

== Format changes ==
For this season, the league was expanded to 16 teams and the teams were divided in two groups (Group Odd, Group Even) formed by the odd teams (1st, 3rd, 5th, 7th,...) and the even teams (2nd, 4th, 6th, 8th,...) of the final standings of the previous season. At the end of first phase, the top four teams of each group advanced to the Group A1 and the rest of the teams of each group advanced to the Group A2. At the end of second phase, the top four teams of the Group A1 advanced to the quarterfinals playoffs, the rest of the teams of the Group A1 and the top four teams of the Group A2 advanced to the first round playoffs, and the rest of the teams of the Group A2 advanced to the relegation playoffs of which three teams were relegated to Primera División B.

Another significant change was the introduction of the overtimes in case of draw.

== Teams ==
=== Promotion and relegation (pre-season) ===
A total of 16 teams contested the league, including 12 sides from the 1982–83 Liga Nacional and four promoted from the 1982–83 Primera División B.

Teams promoted from Primera División B

- Cajamadrid
- Cafisa Canarias
- Hospitalet ATO
- Peñas Recreativas Huesca (achieved a vacant berth after the dissolution of Inmobanco)

=== Venues and locations ===
Location of teams in 1983–84 ACB
Location of teams from Barcelona in 1983–84 ACB
Location of teams from the Canary Islands in 1983–84 ACB

Team	Home city	Arena
Arabatxo Baskonia	Vitoria-Gasteiz	Mendizorrotza
Areslux	Granollers	Municipal
Cafisa Canarias	San Cristóbal de La Laguna	Colegio Luther King
CAI Zaragoza	Zaragoza	Palacio de Deportes
Caja de Ronda	Málaga	Ciudad Jardín
Cajamadrid	Alcalá de Henares	Municipal
Ebro Manresa	Manresa	Congost
Estudiantes Caja Postal	Madrid	Antonio Magariños
FC Barcelona	Barcelona	Palau Blaugrana
Fórum Filatélico Valladolid	Valladolid	Huerta del Rey
Hospitalet ATO	L'Hospitalet	L'Hospitalet Nord
Joventut Massana	Badalona	Club Joventut Badalona
Licor 43	Santa Coloma de Gramenet	Municipal
OAR Ferrol	Ferrol	Punta Arnela
Peñas Recreativas Huesca	Huesca	Municipal
Real Madrid	Madrid	Ciudad Deportiva

== First phase ==
=== Group Odd ===
Pos	Team	Pld	W	L	PF	PA	PD	Pts	Qualification
1	Joventut Massana	14	13	1	1270	1094	+176	27	Qualification to Group A1
2	FC Barcelona	14	12	2	1423	1176	+247	26	Qualification to Group A1
3	Areslux	14	11	3	1180	1071	+109	25	Qualification to Group A1
4	OAR Ferrol	14	6	8	1100	1102	−2	20	Qualification to Group A1
5	Caja de Ronda	14	5	9	1215	1283	−68	19	Qualification to Group A2
6	Cafisa Canarias	14	4	10	1223	1347	−124	18	Qualification to Group A2
7	Peñas Recreativas Huesca	14	3	11	1110	1246	−136	17	Qualification to Group A2
8	Ebro Manresa	14	2	12	1104	1306	−202	16	Qualification to Group A2

Source: Linguasport

=== Group Even ===
Pos	Team	Pld	W	L	PF	PA	PD	Pts	Qualification
1	Real Madrid	14	12	2	1377	1092	+285	26	Qualification to Group A1
2	CAI Zaragoza	14	10	4	1241	1203	+38	24	Qualification to Group A1
3	Cajamadrid	14	10	4	1272	1254	+18	24	Qualification to Group A1
4	Arabatxo Baskonia	14	6	8	1188	1244	−56	20	Qualification to Group A1
5	Estudiantes Caja Postal	14	5	9	1205	1255	−50	19	Qualification to Group A2
6	Licor 43	14	5	9	1186	1248	−62	19	Qualification to Group A2
7	Hospitalet ATO	14	5	9	1144	1204	−60	19	Qualification to Group A2
8	Fórum Filatélico Valladolid	14	3	11	1254	1367	−113	17	Qualification to Group A2

Source: Linguasport

== Second phase ==
=== Group A1 ===
Pos	Team	Pld	W	L	PF	PA	PD	Pts	Qualification
1	Real Madrid	14	13	1	1313	1123	+190	27	Qualification to quarterfinals
2	FC Barcelona	14	12	2	1423	1276	+147	26	Qualification to quarterfinals
3	Cajamadrid	14	7	7	1222	1249	−27	21	Qualification to quarterfinals
4	Areslux	14	7	7	1205	1212	−7	21	Qualification to quarterfinals
5	Joventut Massana	14	7	7	1278	1210	+68	21	Qualification to first round
6	CAI Zaragoza	14	5	9	1267	1305	−38	19	Qualification to first round
7	OAR Ferrol	14	4	10	1111	1244	−133	18	Qualification to first round
8	Arabatxo Baskonia	14	1	13	1199	1399	−200	15	Qualification to first round

Source: Linguasport

=== Group A2 ===
Pos	Team	Pld	W	L	PF	PA	PD	Pts	Qualification
1	Licor 43	14	13	1	1267	1087	+180	27	Qualification to first round
2	Caja de Ronda	14	9	5	1175	1149	+26	23	Qualification to first round
3	Cafisa Canarias	14	8	6	1188	1157	+31	22	Qualification to first round
4	Fórum Filatélico Valladolid	14	7	7	1252	1285	−33	21	Qualification to first round
5	Estudiantes Caja Postal	14	7	7	1149	1138	+11	21	Qualification to relegation playoffs
6	Hospitalet ATO	14	5	9	1134	1166	−32	19	Qualification to relegation playoffs
7	Peñas Recreativas Huesca	14	4	10	1117	1190	−73	18	Qualification to relegation playoffs
8	Ebro Manresa	14	3	11	1041	1151	−110	17	Qualification to relegation playoffs

Source: Linguasport

== Playoffs ==
=== Championship playoffs ===
First round
A1–8 Arabatxo Baskonia	72	93	66
A2–1 Licor 43	94	85	76
A1–5 Joventut Massana	125	113
A2–4 Fórum Valladolid	110	103
A1–7 OAR Ferrol	81	95
A2–2 Caja de Ronda	77	87
A1–6 CAI Zaragoza	106	97
A2–3 Cafisa Canarias	92	85

Quarterfinals
A1–1 Real Madrid	92	82	83
A2–1 Licor 43	70	91	60
A1–4 Areslux	82	100	59
A1–5 Joventut Massana	106	99	74
A1–2 FC Barcelona	109	111
A1–7 OAR Ferrol	91	92
A1–3 Cajamadrid	96	101	83
A1–6 CAI Zaragoza	83	103	84

Semifinals
A1–1 Real Madrid	101	116
A1–5 Joventut Massana	93	89
A1–2 FC Barcelona	100	95	101
A1–6 CAI Zaragoza	104	77	75

Finals
A1–1 Real Madrid	80	79	2
A1–2 FC Barcelona	65	81	0

Source: Linguasport

=== Relegation playoffs ===
First round
A2–5 Estudiantes	93	75
A2–8 Ebro Manresa	91	72
A2–6 Hospitalet ATO	96	82	82
A2–7 Peñas Huesca	102	81	87

Second round
A2–5 Estudiantes	88	78	87
A2–7 Peñas Huesca	82	79	70

Source: Linguasport

== Final standings ==
Pos	Team	Pld	W	L	Qualification or relegation
1	Real Madrid (C)	35	30	5	Qualification to European Champions Cup
2	FC Barcelona	35	29	6	Qualification to European Cup Winners' Cup
3	Joventut Massana	35	24	11	
4	CAI Zaragoza	36	20	16	Qualification to European Cup Winners' Cup
5	Cajamadrid	31	18	13	Qualification to Korać Cup
6	Areslux	31	19	12	
7	OAR Ferrol	32	12	20	Qualification to Korać Cup
8	Licor 43	34	21	13	Qualification to Korać Cup
9	Arabatxo Baskonia	31	8	23	
10	Caja de Ronda	30	14	16	
11	Cafisa Canarias	30	12	18	
12	Fórum Filatélico Valladolid	30	10	20	
13	Estudiantes Caja Postal	33	16	17	
14	Peñas Recreativas Huesca (R)	34	10	24	Relegation to Primera División B
15	Hospitalet ATO (R)	31	11	20	Relegation to Primera División B
16	Ebro Manresa (R)	30	5	25	Relegation to Primera División B

Source: Linguasport
(C) Champions; (R) Relegated
