= 1978–79 Primera División B de Baloncesto =

The 1978–79 Primera División B de Baloncesto was the second tier of the 1978–79 Spanish basketball season.

== Regular season ==
Key to colors
Promotion to 1ª División

#	Teams	P	W	D	L	Pts
1	Valladolid	22	20	0	2	40
2	Helios	22	19	2	1	40
3	La Salle	22	14	0	8	28
4	Canet	22	13	0	9	26
5	Canarias	22	12	0	10	23 ^{(1)}
6	Hospitalet	22	11	1	10	23
7	Náutico	22	10	0	12	20
8	OAR Ferrol	22	8	2	12	18
9	Liria	22	7	1	14	15
10	Caja Ronda	22	6	0	16	12
11	Bosco	22	5	0	17	9 ^{(1)}
12	Alcalá	22	4	0	18	8

^{(1)} Canarias & Bosco 1 pt deducted.
