= 1981–82 Primera División B de Baloncesto =

The 1981–82 Primera División B de Baloncesto was the second tier of the 1981–82 Spanish basketball season.

== Regular season ==
Key to colors
Promotion to 1ª División
Relegation to 2ª División

#	Teams	P	W	D	L	Pts
1	Inmobanco	26	24	0	2	48
2	Basconia	26	19	1	6	39
3	Obradoiro	26	18	0	8	36
4	Renta	26	17	0	9	34
5	Hospitalet	26	16	1	8	33
6	Bosco	26	14	0	12	28
7	Caja Madrid	26	13	0	13	26
8	Pineda	26	11	1	14	23
9	Calasancio	26	10	1	15	21
10	Mataró	26	10	1	15	21
11	Juventud Córdoba	26	9	1	15	19
12	Satecma Patronato	26	8	0	18	16
13	Mongat	26	6	0	20	12
14	Universitario Pamplona	26	3	0	22	6
