= CEB Llíria =

- Founded: 1945 (reformed in 2001)
- History: CB Llíria (1945–2001); CEB Llíria (2001–present)
- Arena: Pavelló Pla d'Arc (capacity: 5,020)
- Location: Llíria, Valencian Community
- Team colors: Black and yellow
| Home | Away |

Club Esportiu Bàsquet Llíria is a basketball club based in Llíria, Spain. It played in Liga ACB from 1991 to 1993.

== History ==
CB Llíria, also known during the 1990s as Ferrys Llíria by sponsorship reasons, promoted to Liga ACB in 1991 and remained in the league two seasons before being relegated again.

In 1994, the club tried to inscribe again in Liga ACB, but it was rejected by the Association. After years in the court, in 2002, Justice ruled in favor of the ACB.

In 2001, the club was re-founded as Club Esportiu Bàsquet Llíria and played in LEB Plata two seasons. Nowadays, the club plays in Liga EBA, fourth tier in Spanish basketball.

== Season by season ==
| Season | Tier | Division | Pos. | W–L | Copa del Rey |
|---|---|---|---|---|---|
| 1972–73 | 2 | 2ª División | 8th | 15–1–12 | |
| 1973–74 | 2 | 2ª División | | | |
| 1974–75 | 2 | 2ª División | 6th | 10–12 | |
| 1975–76 | 3 | 3ª División | | | |
| 1976–77 | 2 | 2ª División | 14th | 11–17 | |
| 1977–78 | 3 | 2ª División | | | |
| 1978–79 | 2 | 1ª División B | 9th | 7–1–14 | |
| 1979–80 | 3 | 2ª División | | | |
| 1980–81 | 2 | 1ª División B | 13th | 7–3–16 | |
| 1981–82 | 3 | 2ª División | | | |
| 1982–83 | 3 | 2ª División | | | |
| 1983–84 | 2 | 1ª División B | 10th | 11–15 | |
| 1984–85 | 2 | 1ª División B | 11th | 11–15 | |
| 1985–86 | 2 | 1ª División B | 12th | 17–14 | |
| 1986–87 | 2 | 1ª División B | 7th | 19–15 | |
| 1987–88 | 2 | 1ª División B | 23rd | 22–20 | |
| 1988–89 | 3 | 2ª División | 1st | | |
| 1989–90 | 2 | 1ª División B | 4th | 19–16 | |
| 1990–91 | 2 | 1ª División | 2nd | 25–17 | |
| 1991–92 | 1 | Liga ACB | 16th | 15–28 | First round |
| 1992–93 | 1 | Liga ACB | 21st | 12–24 | First round |
| 1993–94 | 2 | 1ª División | 21st | 12–24 | |
| 1994–95 | 2 | Liga EBA | 3rd | 23–14 | |
| 1995–96 | 2 | Liga EBA | 10th | 13–17 | |
| 1996–97 | 3 | Liga EBA | 8th | | |
| 1997–02 | Lower divisions | | | | |
| 2002–03 | 4 | Liga EBA | 11th | 12–18 | |
| 2003–04 | 4 | Liga EBA | 3rd | 22–1–10 | |
| 2004–05 | 4 | Liga EBA | 3rd (Note: Achieved a vacant place in LEB 2.) | 22–8 | |
| 2005–06 | 3 | LEB 2 | 13th | 22–10 | |
| 2006–07 | 3 | LEB 2 | 8th | 17–20 | |
| 2007–09 | Lower divisions | | | | |
| 2009–10 | 4 | Liga EBA | 12th | 7–19 | |
| 2010–11 | 4 | Liga EBA | 5th | 15–11 | |
| 2011–12 | 4 | Liga EBA | 5th (Note: Resigned to continue playing in Liga EBA.) | 13–9 | |
| 2012–13 | 5 | 1ª División | 4th | 19–7 | |
| 2013–14 | 5 | 1ª División | 3rd | 20–6 | |
| 2014–15 | 5 | 1ª División | 2nd | 21–8 | |
| 2015–16 | 5 | 1ª División | 1st (Note: Achieved a vacant place in Liga EBA.) | 21–8 | |
| 2016–17 | 4 | Liga EBA | 5th | 11–15 | |
| 2017–18 | 4 | Liga EBA | 7th | 13–14 | |
| 2018–19 | 4 | Liga EBA | 6th | 19–9 | |
