= 1992–93 ACB season =

1992-93 ACB season
- League: Liga ACB
- Sport: Basketball
- Teams: 22
- TV partner: Televisión Española

Regular Season
- Season champions: Real Madrid Teka
- Season MVP: (United States) Darryl Middleton (Valvi Girona)

Playoffs

ACB Finals
- Champions: Real Madrid Teka
- Runners-up: Unicaja
- Finals MVP: (Lithuania) Arvydas Sabonis (Real Madrid Teka)

ACB seasons
- ← 1991–92 1993–94 →

== Regular season ==
| Pos | Team | J | G | P | PF | PC | Qualification |
|---|---|---|---|---|---|---|---|
| 1 | Real Madrid Teka | 31 | 25 | 6 | 2531 | 2287 | Championship Playoffs |
| 2 | Marbella Joventut | 31 | 24 | 7 | 2621 | 2332 | Championship Playoffs |
| 3 | FC Barcelona Banca Catalana | 31 | 23 | 8 | 2670 | 2485 | Championship Playoffs |
| 4 | Estudiantes Argentaria | 31 | 21 | 10 | 2510 | 2403 | Championship Playoffs |
| 5 | Caja San Fernando | 31 | 19 | 12 | 2641 | 2473 | Championship Playoffs |
| 6 | Unicaja Mayoral | 31 | 19 | 12 | 2481 | 2484 | Championship Playoffs |
| 7 | Pamesa Valencia | 31 | 18 | 13 | 2454 | 2451 | Championship Playoffs |
| 8 | Elosúa León | 31 | 17 | 14 | 2683 | 2557 | Championship Playoffs |
| 9 | Taugrés | 31 | 17 | 14 | 2610 | 2540 | Championship Playoffs |
| 10 | Natwest Zaragoza | 31 | 16 | 15 | 2310 | 2310 | Championship Playoffs |
| 11 | Coren Orense | 31 | 15 | 16 | 2450 | 2476 | Championship Playoffs |
| 12 | Festina Andorra | 31 | 15 | 16 | 2345 | 2349 | Championship Playoffs |
| 13 | TDK Manresa | 31 | 15 | 16 | 2416 | 2489 | Championship Playoffs |
| 14 | BFI Granollers | 31 | 13 | 18 | 2483 | 2554 | Championship Playoffs |
| 15 | Pescanova Ferrol | 31 | 12 | 19 | 2307 | 2483 | Championship Playoffs |
| 16 | Valvi Girona | 31 | 12 | 19 | 2458 | 2550 | Championship Playoffs |
| 17 | DYC Breogán | 31 | 12 | 19 | 2591 | 2619 | |
| 18 | Grupo Libro Valladolid | 31 | 11 | 20 | 2412 | 2542 | |
| 19 | Argal Huesca | 31 | 11 | 20 | 2488 | 2574 | Relegation playoffs |
| 20 | Ferrys Llíria | 31 | 10 | 21 | 2417 | 2545 | Relegation playoffs |
| 21 | Cáceres CB | 31 | 9 | 22 | 2365 | 2470 | Relegation playoffs |
| 22 | Júver Murcia | 31 | 7 | 24 | 2260 | 2530 | Relegation playoffs |

== Relegation playoffs ==
| Finals |
| 19 | Argal Huesca | 3 |
| 22 | Júver Murcia | 1 |

| Finals |
| 20 | Ferrys Llíria | 2 |
| 21 | Cáceres CB | 3 |

Júver Murcia and Ferrys Llíria, relegated to 1ª División. As BFI Granollers is dissolved, Júver Murcia stays at Liga ACB.

== Championship Playoffs ==
First round
1 | Real Madrid Teka | 2
16 | Valvi Girona | 0
8 | Elosúa León | 2
9 | Taugrés | 0
4 | Estudiantes Arg. | 2
13 | TDK Manresa | 1
5 | Caja San Fernando | 2
13 | Festina Andorra | 0
2 | Marbella Joventut | 2
15 | Pescanova Ferrol | 0
7 | Pamesa Valencia | 1
10 | NatWest Zaragoza | 2
3 | FC Barcelona | 2
14 | Granollers | 0
6 | Unicaja Mayoral | 0
11 | Coren Orense | 2

Quarterfinals
1 | Real Madrid Teka | 2
8 | Elosúa León | 0
4 | Estudiantes Arg. | 2
5 | Caja San Fernando | 1
2 | Marbella Joventut | 2
10 | NatWest Zaragoza | 1
3 | FC Barcelona | 2
11 | Coren Orense | 0

Semifinals
1 | Real Madrid Teka | 3
4 | Estudiantes Arg. | 2
2 | Marbella Joventut | 3
3 | FC Barcelona | 2

Finals
1 | Real Madrid Teka | 3
2 | Marbella Joventut | 2

1992-93 ACB League
Real Madrid Teka
4th title
since ACB
