= CD Cajamadrid =

Spanish basketball and handball club

- Founded: 1979
- Dissolved: 1991
- Arena: Pabellón Caja Madrid
- Capacity: 4,550
- Location: Alcalá de Henares, Spain
- Team colors: Green and white
Home	Away

Club Deportivo Cajamadrid was a professional basketball and handball team in Spain. It was founded in 1979 and the basketball team played in Liga ACB from 1983 to 1986 and participated in the Korac Cup during the 1984–85 season. The club was sponsored by Caja Madrid until 1991, when the bank decided to retire its support and continued as a different club called Juventud Alcalá.

The handball section played in Liga ASOBAL until 1991.

== Season by season (basketball team) ==
Season	Tier	Division	Pos.	W–L	European competitions		
1980–81	3	2ª División	1st	27–4			
1981–82	2	1ª División B	7th	13–13			
1982–83	2	1ª División B	1st	22–1–3			
1983–84	1	Liga ACB	5th	18–13			
1984–85	1	Liga ACB	13th	14–19	3 Korać Cup	GS	5–3
1985–86	1	Liga ACB	14th	14–20			
1986–87	2	1ª División B	4th	24–10			
1987–88	2	1ª División B	13th	26–17			
1988–89	2	1ª División	3dr	24–14			
1989–90	2	1ª División	5th	23–9			
1990–91	2	1ª División	5th	23–16			

== Honours ==
- Spanish Second Division (1): 1983
- Spanish Third Division (1): 1981

== Notable players ==
- (Spain) José Manuel Beirán
- (Spain) José Luis Llorente
- (Spain) Juan Antonio Orenga
- (Spain) Wayne Brabender
- (United States) Ken Howard
- (United States) Norris Coleman
- (United States) Bob Thornton
- (Canada) Greg Wiltjer
- (Croatia) Andro Knego
