= 1969–70 Liga Española de Baloncesto =

Liga Española de Baloncesto
- Season: 1969–70
- Games played: 132
- Teams: 12
- TV partner(s): TVE

Finals
- Champions: Real Madrid (12th title)
- Runners-up: Picadero Damm

Statistical leaders
- Points: Charles Thomas

Records
- Biggest home win: Real Madrid 103–37 Náutico (22 November 1969)
- Biggest away win: Español 47–85 Barcelona (6 December 1969)
- Highest scoring: Real Madrid 101–98 Juventud (14 December 1969)
- Winning streak: 11 games Real Madrid
- Losing streak: 13 games Atlético San Sebastián

The 1969–70 Liga Española de Baloncesto season was the 14th season of the Liga Española de Baloncesto and was played between 1 November 1969 and 25 March 1970. The season ended with Real Madrid winning their 12th title.

== Overview before the season ==
12 teams joined the league, including two promoted from the 1968–69 Segunda División.

Promoted from 1968 to 1969 Segunda División

- Español
- Águilas Schweppes

== Teams and locations ==
Location of teams in 1969–70 Liga Española de Baloncesto
Location of teams in 1969–70 Liga Española de Baloncesto (Canary Islands)

Team	Home city
Águilas Schweppes	Bilbao
Atlético San Sebastián	San Sebastián
Barcelona	Barcelona
Español	Barcelona
Estudiantes	Madrid
Juventud Nerva	Badalona
Kas	Bilbao
Mataró Molfort's	Mataró
Náutico	Santa Cruz de Tenerife
Picadero Damm	Barcelona
Real Madrid	Madrid
San José Irpen	Badalona

== Regular season ==
=== League table ===
Pos	Team	Pld	W	D	L	PF	PA	PD	Pts	Qualification or relegation
1	Real Madrid (C)	22	19	0	3	2082	1601	+481	38	Qualification to FIBA European Champions Cup
2	Picadero Damm	22	18	1	3	1778	1532	+246	37	
3	Juventud Nerva	22	17	1	4	1887	1545	+342	35	Qualification to FIBA European Cup Winners' Cup
4	Kas	22	14	0	8	1660	1548	+112	28	
5	Estudiantes	22	11	1	10	1727	1597	+130	23	
6	Barcelona	22	11	0	11	1664	1550	+114	22	
7	San José Irpen	22	10	0	12	1729	1765	−36	20	
8	Mataró Molfort's	22	9	0	13	1686	1743	−57	18	
9	Águilas Schweppes (O)	22	8	0	14	1459	1692	−233	16	Relegation playoffs
10	Náutico (O)	22	6	0	16	1244	1701	−457	12	Relegation playoffs
11	Atlético San Sebastián (R)	22	4	0	18	1395	1671	−276	8	Relegation
12	Español (R)	22	3	1	18	1495	1861	−366	7	Relegation

Source: Linguasport^{[usurped]}
(C) Champions; (O) Play-off winners; (R) Relegated

== Relegation playoffs ==
Team 1	Agg.	Team 2	1st leg	2nd leg
Águilas Schweppes	143–139	Fiber Urcelay	75–74	68–65
Pineda	150–164	Náutico	88–83	62–81

== Statistics leaders ==
=== Points ===
Rank	Name	Team	Points
1	(United States) Charles Thomas	San José Irpen	529
2	(United States) Norman Carmichael	Barcelona	517
3	(Spain) Lorenzo Alocén	Picadero Damm	466
4	(Spain) Clifford Luyk	Real Madrid	464
5	(Spain) José Luis Martínez	Mataró Molfort's	421
