= BC Andorra =

MoraBanc Andorra
- Leagues: Liga ACB
- Founded: 12 June 1970; 56 years ago
- History: CB Les Escaldes; 1970–1971; BC Andorra; 1971–present
- Arena: Poliesportiu d'Andorra
- Capacity: 5,000
- Location: Andorra la Vella, Andorra
- Team colors: Blue, white, cyan
- President: Gorka Aixàs
- Vice-presidents: Xavi Mujal; Pere Aixàs
- Head coach: Žan Tabak
- Championships: 1 LEB Oro; 1 LEB Plata; 1 Copa Príncipe; 2 Lliga Catalana
- Website: bca.ad
Home	Away

Bàsquet Club Andorra SAOE, also known as MoraBanc Andorra for sponsorship reasons, is a professional basketball team that is based in Andorra la Vella, Andorra. Though based in Andorra, the club plays in the Spanish basketball league system. The team plays in the Liga ACB with home games played at the Poliesportiu d'Andorra.

From 1992 to 1996, BC Andorra played in the top league, the Liga ACB and also the Korać Cup during the 1995–96 season. After being relegated and playing one season in LEB league, the club resigned to its berth and came back to regional competitions. The club returned to Liga ACB in 2014, 18 years after its last appearance.

== History ==
On 12 June 1970 the club was founded as Club de Basket Les Escaldes, and changed its name to Bàsquet Club Andorra on 12 April 1971.

BC Andorra began playing in the regional competitions of Lleida, being promoted in the 1975–76 season to Primera Catalana. The following season the club resigned the category due to financial problems, but achieved a promotion again during the 1980–81 season. The club was promoted to the Spanish Third Division at the end of 1981–82 season and the Spanish Second Division during the 1983–84 season. In the 1985–86 season, Andorra reached the Primera Division B after 6 seasons and won the promotion to the Liga ACB, where BC Andorra remained four seasons. During the 1995–96 season the Andorran club participated in the Korać Cup. In 1996, the club was relegated to LEB and in the following seasons, competed at the low levels of Catalonia and Spain until 2009–10, when BC Andorra participated in the LEB Plata.

In the 2012–13 season, BC Andorra participated in the LEB Oro, the second division of the Spanish basketball, reaching the play-off final promotion to the Liga ACB and being finalist of the Copa Príncipe.

The following season the Andorran club achieved the Copa Príncipe and the promotion to the top league of Spain after becoming winners of the 2013–14 LEB Oro.

In 2017, Andorra qualified for the first time since 22 years to the ACB playoffs, where they were eliminated in the quarterfinals by Real Madrid. This allowed the Andorrans to come back to the European competitions in the 2017–18 season, as the club registered in the EuroCup. After a first experience where the club was eliminated in the first round, Andorra reached the semifinals in their second participation.

== Support ==
BC Andorra is one of the most followed club of Andorra with approximately 1,200 associates and a reference of the Andorran basketball. In 2014 was founded the first official fan-club supporter Penya Tricolor. Some notable club supporters include Albert Llovera, Joaquim Rodríguez, José Luis Llorente, Roberto Dueñas or Cédric Gracia.

== Presidents ==
- Joan Alay: Honorary president (Founder)
- Magí Maestre: 1970–71 (Founder)
- Eduard Molné: 1971–90 (Founder)
- Carles Fiñana: 1990–94
- Manel Arajol: 1994–2007
- Gorka Aixàs: 2007–present

== Sponsorship naming ==
BC Andorra has had several sponsorship names over the years:

- Festina Andorra: 1991–96
- Quick Andorra: 2000–02
- River Andorra: 2002–13
- River Andorra MoraBanc: 2013–14
- MoraBanc Andorra: 2014–present

== Uniforms ==
Traditional "tricolor"	Festina Andorra away	2002–2006 River Andorra	2002–2013 away uniform	Alternative "tricolor"	2016 Alternative

== Players ==
=== Current roster ===
Note: Flags indicate national team eligibility at FIBA-sanctioned events. Players may hold other non-FIBA nationalities not displayed.

MoraBanc Andorra roster
Players
Coaches

Pos.	No.	Nat.	Name	Ht.	Age
PF	0	(United States)	McGriff, Cam	2.01 m (6 ft 7 in)	29 – 30 September 1997
F	1	(Bosnia and Herzegovina)	Mutić, Lazar	2.03 m (6 ft 8 in)	27 – 6 January 1999
SG	3	(Canada)	Best, Aaron	1.93 m (6 ft 4 in)	34 – 1 September 1992
PG	5	(Brazil)	Luz, Rafa (C)	1.88 m (6 ft 2 in)	34 – 11 February 1992
G	7	(Spain)	Ortega, Chumi	1.90 m (6 ft 3 in)	29 – 13 August 1997
PF	8	(Spain)	Aquino, Owen	2.03 m (6 ft 8 in)	23 – 8 January 2003
PG	11	(United States)	Akinjo, James	1.85 m (6 ft 1 in)	25 – 27 November 2000
C	13	(Ukraine)	Pustovyi, Artem	2.19 m (7 ft 2 in)	34 – 25 June 1992
SG	24	(Slovakia)	Kuric, Kyle	1.93 m (6 ft 4 in)	37 – 25 August 1989
SF	25	(Nigeria)	Iwundu, Wes	1.98 m (6 ft 6 in)	31 – 20 December 1994
G	30	(Canada)	Robertson, Kassius	1.90 m (6 ft 3 in)	32 – 20 April 1994
PG	40	(Spain)	Bottiroli, Luka (Y)	1.78 m (5 ft 10 in)	17 – 10 January 2009
C	43	(Croatia)	Radošević, Leon	2.08 m (6 ft 10 in)	36 – 26 February 1990
G	88	(Georgia (country))	Andronikashvili, Rati	1.94 m (6 ft 4 in)	25 – 19 March 2001

Head coach

- (Croatian Basketball Federation) Žan Tabak

Assistant coach(es)

- (Spanish Basketball Federation) Paco Vázquez
- (Spanish Basketball Federation) Alejandro González

Legend

- (C) Team captain
- Injured

- Roster
- Transactions
Updated: September 13, 2026

=== Depth chart ===
Pos.	Starting 5	Bench 1	Bench 2	Bench 3
C	Artem Pustovyi	Leon Radošević
PF	Cam McGriff *	Owen Aquino †
SF	Wes Iwundu	Lazar Mutic †
SG	Aaron Best	Kyle Kuric	Chumi Ortega †
PG	Kassius Robertson	Rafa Luz †	James Akinjo *	Luka Bottiroli ‡

Notes: Blue † – homegrown player; (Note: A homegrown player is a player that played for at least three years before the age of 20 on a Spanish team. In Liga ACB, the team must register at least four homegrown players in rosters of 10–12 players or at least three homegrown players in rosters of 8–9 players.) Red * – overseas player; (Note: An overseas player is a player from outside EEA, FIBA Europe or ACP states. In Liga ACB, the team may register at most two overseas players.) Green ‡ – youth player (Note: In Liga ACB, the team may register under-22 players linked to the youth system.)

== Season by season ==
Season	Tier	Division	Pos.	W–L	Copa del Rey	Other cups		European competitions		
1980–81	5	1ª Catalana	6th							
1981–82	5	1ª Catalana								
1982–83	4	3ª División	5th							
1983–84	4	3ª División	1st							
1984–85	3	2ª División	6th							
1985–86	3	2ª División	1st							
1986–87	2	1ª División B	22nd	12–22						
1987–88	2	1ª División B	20th	22–20						
1988–89	2	1ª División	10th	15–15						
1989–90	2	1ª División	5th	19–14						
1990–91	2	1ª División	4th	23–18						
1991–92	2	1ª División	1st	29–12						
1992–93	1	Liga ACB	12th	15–18	First round					
1993–94	1	Liga ACB	9th	20–12	First round					
1994–95	1	Liga ACB	8th	20–20	Quarterfinalist					
1995–96	1	Liga ACB	19th	11–31				3 Korać Cup	GS	3–7
1996–97	2	LEB	4th (Note: Resigned to the berth in the league due to financial problems.)	21–19						
1997–98	7	3ª Catalana	1st							
1998–99	6	2ª Catalana	1st							
1999–00	5	1ª Catalana	1st							
2000–01	5	Copa Catalunya	7th	18–12						
2001–02	5	Copa Catalunya	2nd	21–11						
2002–03	5	Copa Catalunya	6th	17–13						
2003–04	5	Copa Catalunya	4th	21–9						
2004–05	5	Copa Catalunya	1st	26–6						
2005–06	4	Liga EBA	7th	16–14						
2006–07	4	Liga EBA	9th	13–13						
2007–08	4	Liga EBA	5th	20–10						
2008–09	4	Liga EBA	2nd	23–10						
2009–10	3	LEB Plata	6th	21–15						
2010–11	3	LEB Plata	3rd	27–14		Copa LEB Plata	RU			
2011–12	3	LEB Plata	1st	19–5		Copa LEB Plata	RU			
2012–13	2	LEB Oro	3rd	30–10		Copa Príncipe	RU			
2013–14	2	LEB Oro	1st	21–5		Copa Príncipe	C			
2014–15	1	Liga ACB	14th	12–22						
2015–16	1	Liga ACB	14th	12–22						
2016–17	1	Liga ACB	8th	17–18	Quarterfinalist					
2017–18	1	Liga ACB	6th	20–17				2 EuroCup	RS	3–7
2018–19	1	Liga ACB	10th	16–18				2 EuroCup	SF	13–8
2019–20	1	Liga ACB	9th	15–13	Semifinalist			2 EuroCup	T16	8–8
2020–21	1	Liga ACB	9th	17–19				2 EuroCup	T16	6–10
2021–22	1	Liga ACB	17th	11–23				2 EuroCup	SF	12–7
2022–23	2	LEB Oro	1st	30–4		Copa Príncipe	RU			
2023–24	1	Liga ACB	11th	13–21						
2024–25	1	Liga ACB	11th	14–20				3 Champions League	QR2	1–1
2025–26	1	Liga ACB	16th	10–24						

== Trophies and awards ==
=== Trophies ===
- 2nd division championships: (2)
  - 1ª División B: (1) 1992
  - LEB Oro: (1) 2014
- 3rd division championships: (1)
  - LEB Plata: (1) 2012
- Lliga Catalana: (2)
  - 2018, 2020
- Lliga Catalana LEB Oro: (1)
  - 2013
- Lliga Catalana LEB Plata: (1)
  - 2010
- Lliga Catalana EBA: (3)
  - 1989, 1990, 1992
- Copa Príncipe: (1)
  - 2014
- Trofeo Ciutat de Valencia: (1)
  - 2017

=== Individual awards ===
LEB Oro MVP

- Jordi Trias – 2014

All-ACB First Team

- Giorgi Shermadini – 2017

All LEB Oro First Team

- Marc Blanch – 2013, 2014
- Jordi Trias – 2014

== Notable players ==
Note: Flags indicate national team eligibility at FIBA-sanctioned events. Players may hold other non-FIBA nationalities not displayed.

Criteria

To appear in this section a player must have either:

- Set a club record or won an individual award while at the club
- Played at least one official international match for their national team at any time
- Played at least one official NBA match at any time.

- (Andorra) (Spain) Quino Colom (youth teams)
- (Andorra) (Spain) David Navarro
- (Australia) Nathan Jawai
- (Austria) Thomas Schreiner
- (Bosnia and Herzegovina) Nikola Marić
- (Brazil) Rafa Luz
- (Bulgaria) (United States) Codi Miller-McIntyre
- (Czech Republic) David Jelínek
- (Dominican Republic) Jean Montero
- (Finland) Alexander Madsen
- (France) Andrew Albicy
- (France) Sekou Doumbouya
- (France) Amine Noua
- (Georgia (country)) Giorgi Shermadini
- (Georgia (country)) Beka Burjanadze
- (Greece) Georgios Bogris
- (Greece) Thanasis Antetokounmpo
- (Guinea) (United States) Shannon Evans
- (Jamaica) (Canada) Dylan Ennis
- (North Macedonia) Vojdan Stojanovski
- (Nigeria) Stan Okoye
- (Poland) (United States) Jerrick Harding
- (Puerto Rico) José "Piculín" Ortiz
- (Senegal) Moussa Diagne
- (Senegal) (United States) Clevin Hannah
- (Serbia) Luka Bogdanović
- (Serbia) Dejan Todorović
- (Slovenia) Jaka Blažič
- (Slovenia) Martin Krampelj
- (Spain) Ferran Bassas
- (Spain) Jaime Fernández
- (Spain) Sergi García
- (Spain) José Luis Llorente
- (Spain) Josep Maria Margall
- (Spain) Nacho Martín
- (Spain) Oriol Paulí
- (Spain) (Dominican Republic) Tyson Pérez
- (Spain) Víctor Sada
- (Spain) Jordi Trias
- (Spain) Enrique Villalobos
- (Ukraine) Artem Pustovyi
- (United States) (Israel) T. J. Cline
- (United States) Eric Anderson
- (United States) Rickey Brown
- (United States) Dan Godfread
- (United States) Conner Henry
- (United States) (Slovakia) Kyle Kuric
- (United States) Jerrod Mustaf
- (United States) John Shurna
- (United States) Andy Toolson
