= CB L'Hospitalet =

- Leagues: LEB Plata
- Founded: 1929
- Arena: Nou Pavelló del Centre
- Location: L'Hospitalet de Llobregat, Catalonia, Spain
- Team colors: White
- Head coach: Jose Manuel Hoya
- Championships: 1 Spanish Cup; 1 LEB Plata Championship; 2 Liga EBA Championship
- Website: cbhospitalet.cat
Home	Away

Club Bàsquet L'Hospitalet, also known as Torrons Vicens L'Hospitalet for sponsorship reasons, is a professional basketball team based in L'Hospitalet de Llobregat, Catalonia and plays in the Complex Esportiu L'Hospitalet Nord, in LEB Plata league.

CB L'Hospitalet organises annually the under-18 City of L'Hospitalet Tournament, integrated in the Euroleague Basketball Next Generation Tournament.

== History ==
Founded in 1929, CB L'Hospitalet is one of the oldest basketball clubs in Spain. In their first years, the club achieved one Spanish Cup in 1940, became runner-up in the next year and in both seasons, it won two Catalan championships.

In 1974, CB L'Hospitalet achieved their first promotion ever to the National League, where it played until 1978. In 1983, after promoting again, L'Hospitalet became one of the founding clubs of the Liga ACB, but they only played the first season, as the club finished in the last position.

After several relegations, L'Hospitalet comes back to Liga EBA, third tier in that time, in 1999 and it becomes champion in the 2003–04 season, thus promoting to LEB 2, the new third division later renamed as LEB Plata.

The club achieves the league title in their debut season in the league, and promoted to LEB league, where they played three seasons until its relegation in 2008, achieving the qualification to the promotion playoffs to Liga ACB in 2006.

In 2010, L'Hospitalet could not register in LEB Plata due to the inability to meet the financial requirements and was dropped to the fifth tier, but came back to Liga EBA by achieving a vacant berth in the Group C.

In the 2015–16 season, L'Hospitalet registered a 30–2 record for promoting to LEB Plata, six years after the last time they played. The club was relegated again to Liga EBA. However, it remained in the league due to the existence of vacant places in it.

== Season by season ==
Season	Tier	Division	Pos.	W–L	Copa del Rey	Other cups	
1929–56	Copa del Rey		1 time champion (39–40), 1 time runner-up (40–41)				
1956–65	Lower divisions						
1965–66	1	1ª División	8th	5–13	Quarterfinalist		
1966–67	1	1ª División	10th	3–17			
1967–68	2	2ª División	4th	9–9			
1968–69	2	2ª División	10th	1–1–16			
1969–73	Lower divisions						
1973–74	2	2ª División		–			
1974–75	1	1ª División	9th	7–1–14			
1975–76	1	1ª División	7th	14–1–17			
1976–77	1	1ª División	7th	14–1–17	First round		
1977–78	1	1ª División	12th	5–1–16	First round		
1978–79	2	1ª División B	6th	11–1–10			
1979–80	2	1ª División B	3rd	23–1–6			
1980–81	1	1ª División	10th	9–17			
1981–82	2	1ª División B	4th	16–1–8			
1982–83	2	1ª División B	3rd	17–2–7			
1983–84	1	Liga ACB	15th	11–20			
1984–85	2	1ª División B	6th	14–12			
1985–86	2	1ª División B	14th	15–16			
1986–90	Lower divisions						
1989–90	2	1ª División	11th	16–19			
1990–91	2	1ª División	11th	19–25			
1991–92	2	1ª División	16th	11–25			
1992–99	Lower divisions						
1999–00	4	Copa Catalunya	3rd				
2000–01	4	Liga EBA	8th	15–15			
2001–02	4	Liga EBA	4th	21–11			
2002–03	4	Liga EBA	9th	16–14			
2003–04	4	Liga EBA	1st	27–6			
2004–05	3	LEB 2	1st	27–10			
2005–06	2	LEB	6th	17–20			
2006–07	2	LEB	12th	16–18			
2007–08	2	LEB Oro	18th	11–23			
2008–09	3	LEB Plata	5th	22–13		Copa LEB Plata	RU
2009–10	3	LEB Plata	17th (Note: Resigned to continue playing in LEB Plata.)	11–17			
2010–11	5	Copa Catalunya	7th (Note: Achieved a vacant berth in Liga EBA.)	14–16			
2011–12	4	Liga EBA	4th	17–11			
2012–13	4	Liga EBA	8th	16–14			
2013–14	4	Liga EBA	5th	11–9			
2014–15	4	Liga EBA	2nd	21–8			
2015–16	4	Liga EBA	1st	29–2			
2016–17	3	LEB Plata	13th (Note: Remained in LEB Plata due to the existence of vacant berths.)	10–20			
2017–18	3	LEB Plata	7th	19–15			
2018–19	3	LEB Plata	16th	16–18			
2019–20	3	LEB Plata	17th (Note: Season curtailed due to the COVID-19 pandemic.)	12–13			
2020–21	3	LEB Plata	14th	6–20			
2021–22	4	Liga EBA	1st	20–2			
2022–23	3	LEB Plata	11th	8–18			
2023–24	3	LEB Plata	12th (Note: Resigned due to economical reasons.)	10–16			

== Trophies and awards ==
=== Trophies ===
- Spanish Cups: (1)
  - 1940
- 2nd division Championships: (1)
  - 2ª División: (1) 1974
- LEB Plata: (1)
  - 2005
- Catalan Championship: (2)
  - 1940, 1941

=== Individual awards ===
LEB Oro MVP

- Thomas Terrell – 2006

LEB Plata MVP

- Thomas Terrell – 2005

== Notable players ==
- (Spain) José Ángel Antelo
- (Spain) Joan Creus
- (Spain) Xavi Fernández
- (Spain) Ferran Laviña
- (Spain) Roger Grimau
- (Spain) Edgar San Epifanio
- (United States) Thomas Terrell
- (Republic of the Congo) (Spain) Serge Ibaka
- (United States) Chris Copeland
