= CB Guadalajara =

- Nickname: Rayet Guadalajara
- Founded: 1972
- Dissolved: 2011
- Arena: Palacio Multiusos de Guadalajara
- Location: Guadalajara, Spain
- Team colors: Purple, white
- President: (Spain) Antonio de la Orden
- Head coach: (Spain) Román Peinado
- Website: www.cbguadalajara.es
Home	Away

Club Baloncesto Guadalajara was a professional Basketball team based in Guadalajara, Castile-La Mancha, Spain. It was also known as Rayet Guadalajara by sponsorship reasons.

After the 1992–93 season, the team was promoted to Liga ACB, the Spanish top league, but due to financial problems CB Guadalajara renounced promotion

In 2011, the club was dissolved due to huge debts.

== Season by season ==
Season	Tier	Division	Pos.	W–L	Cup competitions	
1978–79	4	3ª División	3rd			
1979–80	4	3ª División	7th			
1980–81	4	3ª División	5th			
1981–82	4	3ª División				
1982–83	3	2ª División	5th			
1983–84	3	2ª División	1st			
1984–85	2	1ª División B	13th	7–19		
1985–86	3	2ª División	1st			
1986–87	2	1ª División B	11th	16–18		
1987–88	2	1ª División B	19th	22–20		
1988–89	2	1ª División	8th	18–15		
1989–90	2	1ª División	9th	15–15		
1990–91	2	1ª División	9th	20–19		
1991–92	2	1ª División	10th	20–16		
1992–93	2	1ª División	2nd (Note: Resigned to promote to Liga ACB.)	33–13		
1993–94	2	1ª División	15th	11–19		
1994–95	2	Liga EBA	3rd	17–9		
1995–96	3	Liga EBA	7th			
1996–97	3	Liga EBA	10th			
1997–98	3	Liga EBA	6th	13–12		
1998–99	3	Liga EBA	4th	20–10		
1999–00	3	Liga EBA	2nd (Note: Achieved a vacant berth in LEB 2.)	19–8		
2000–01	3	LEB 2	12th	12–18		
2001–02	3	LEB 2	8th	16–17	Copa LEB 2	SF
2002–03	3	LEB 2	13th	12–18		
2003–04	3	LEB 2	10th	11–15		
2004–05	4	LEB 2	15th	11–24		
2005–06	4	Liga EBA	3rd	23–1–9		
2006–07	4	Liga EBA	3rd (Note: Was invited to join the newly created LEB Bronce.)	21–8		
2007–08	4	LEB Bronce	5th	21–14		
2008–09	4	LEB Bronce	13th (Note: After the dissolution of the LEB Bronce, achieved a vacant berth in LEB Plata.)	12–18		
2009–10	3	LEB Plata	12th	12–18		
2010–11	3	LEB Plata	13th	8–20		
