= 1988–89 Primera División de Baloncesto =

The 1988–89 Primera División season was the second category of the Spanish basketball league system during the 1988–89 season. It was the first played with the name of Primera División.

== Format ==
16 teams played this season.

- Regular Season
  - League of 16 teams in a single group where they play all against all in two rounds.
  - The last two teams are relegated to Segunda Division.
- Promotion playoffs
  - The top 8 play two knockout rounds for promotion. The first round is the best of 3 matches (first and third matches are played at the home of the best classified in the previous phase) and the second to the best of 5 (first, third and fifth matches are played at the home of the best classified in the phase previous). The two winners go up to the ACB League.
- Relegation playoffs
  - Those classified between the 11th to 14th places play a best of 5 matches (first, third and fifth matches are played at the home of the best classified in the previous phase), the 2 losers go down to Segunda Division.

== Teams ==
=== Promotion and relegation (pre-season) ===
A total of 16 teams contested the league, including 11 sides from the 1987–88 season, two promoted from the Segunda División and three Wild Cards.

Teams promoted from Segunda División

- Cajahuelva
- CB Torrejon

Wild Cards

- CAB Obradoiro, who obtained a relegation place the previous season.
- Tenerife Sur, who obtained a relegation place the previous season.
- Syrius Patronato

Teams that resigned to participate

- Ordenadores APD Mataró
- CB Tizona sold his place to Caja Badajoz, who obtained a relegation place the previous season.

=== Venues and locations ===
Location of teams in 1988–89 1ªDivisión
Location of teams from the Canary Islands in 1988–89 1ªDivisión
Location of teams in 1988–89 1ªDivisión (Community of Madrid)

Team	Home city
BC Andorra	Andorra la Vella
CAB Obradoiro	Santiago de Compostela
Caixa Ourense	Ourense
Caja Badajoz	Badajoz
Caja San Fernando	Sevilla
Cajahuelva	Huelva
CB Guadalajara	Guadalajara
CB Oviedo	Oviedo
CB Torrejón	Torrejón de Ardoz
CD Cajamadrid	Alcalá de Henares
Elosúa León	León
Júver Murcia	Murcia
Lagisa Gijón	Gijón
Santa Coloma	Santa Coloma de Gramenet
Syrius Patronato	Palma de Mallorca
Tenerife Sur	Arona

== Regular season ==
Pos	Team	Pld	W	L	PF	PA	PD	Pts	Qualification or relegation
1	CD Cajamadrid	30	20	10	2862	2668	+194	50	Qualification to Promotion
2	Syrius Patronato	30	19	11	2629	2594	+35	49	Qualification to Promotion
3	Lagisa Gijón	30	19	11	2739	2610	+129	49	Qualification to Promotion
4	Caixa Ourense	30	19	11	2552	2454	+98	49	Qualification to Promotion
5	Júver Murcia	30	19	11	2523	2401	+122	49	Qualification to Promotion
6	Caja San Fernando	30	17	13	2723	2600	+123	47	Qualification to Promotion
7	Caja Badajoz	30	17	13	2620	2602	+18	47	Qualification to Promotion
8	CB Guadalajara	30	17	13	2577	2494	+83	47	Qualification to Promotion
9	CB Oviedo	30	16	14	2556	2534	+22	46	
10	BC Andorra	30	15	15	2552	2539	+13	45	
11	Elosúa León	30	14	16	2620	2663	−43	44	Qualification to Relegation
12	Cajahuelva	30	13	17	2878	2721	+157	43	Qualification to Relegation
13	CAB Obradoiro	30	10	20	2468	2680	−212	40	Qualification to Relegation
14	Santa Coloma	30	10	20	2499	2555	−56	40	Qualification to Relegation
15	Tenerife Sur	30	9	21	2339	2654	−315	39	Relegation to Segunda División
16	CB Torrejón	30	6	24	2653	2819	−166	36	Relegation to Segunda División

Source: hispaligas.net

== PlayOffs ==
=== Promotion playoffs ===
Semifinal winners are promoted to Liga ACB.

First Round
1 CD Cajamadrid	75	67	83
8 CB Guadalajara	73	70	82
4 Caixa Ourense	89	78	77
5 Júver Murcia	79	81	68
2 Syrius Patronato	102	85	97
7 Caja Badajoz	84	87	75
3 Lagisa Gijón	81	74	78
6 Caja San Fernando	95	73	80

Second Round
1 CD Cajamadrid	77	73	70	82	94
4 Caixa Ourense	66	75	88	69	95
2 Syrius Patronato	91	79	80
6 Caja San Fernando	93	84	87

Promoted to Liga ACB
4 Caixa Ourense
6 Caja San Fernando

=== Relegation playoffs ===
Team 1	Series	Team 2	Game 1	Game 2	Game 3	Game 4	Game 5
Elosúa León	3–0	Santa Coloma	69–67	70–69	78–67		
Cajahuelva	2–3	CAB Obradoiro	102–74	71–99	73–66	83–91	57–60

== Final standings ==
Pos	Team	Pld	W	L	Qualification or relegation
1	Caixa Ourense (P)	38	24	14	Promoted to ACB
2	Caja San Fernando (P)	36	22	14	Promoted to ACB
3	CD Cajamadrid	38	24	14	
4	Syrius Patronato	36	21	15	
5	Lagisa Gijón	33	20	13	
6	Júver Murcia	33	20	13	
7	Caja Badajoz	33	18	15	
8	CB Guadalajara	33	18	15	
9	CB Oviedo	30	16	14	Resigned to participate next season
10	BC Andorra	30	15	15	
11	Elosúa León	33	17	16	
12	CAB Obradoiro	32	13	19	
13	Cajahuelva	35	15	20	Relegation to Segunda División
14	Santa Coloma (R)	33	10	23	Relegation to Segunda División
15	Tenerife Sur (R)	30	9	21	Relegation to Segunda División
16	CB Torrejón (R)	30	6	24	Relegation to Segunda División

Source: hispaligas.net
(P) Promoted; (R) Relegated
