= 1982–83 Primera División B de Baloncesto =

The 1982–83 Primera División B de Baloncesto was the second tier of the 1982–83 Spanish basketball season.

== Regular season ==
Key to colors
Promotion to 1ª División
Relegation to 2ª División

#	Teams	P	W	D	L	Pts
1	Cajamadrid	26	22	1	3	45
2	Canarias	26	20	1	5	41
3	Hospitalet	26	17	2	7	36
4	Peñas	26	15	2	9	32
5	Náutico	26	16	0	9	32
6	Español	26	13	1	12	27
7	Pineda	26	13	1	12	27
8	Canoe	26	12	2	12	26
9	Bosco	26	12	1	13	25
10	Fortuna	26	11	2	13	24
11	La Salle	26	8	4	14	20
12	Sant Josep Badalona	26	7	2	17	16
13	Mataró	26	5	1	20	11
14	Calasancio	26	1	0	25	1 ^{(1)}

^{(1)} Calasancio 1 pt deducted.
