= Liga ACB =

Spanish premier professional basketball league

Liga Endesa
- Founded: 1983; 43 years ago
- First season: 1983–84
- Country: Spain
- Other club from: Andorra
- Federation: Spanish Federation
- Confederation: FIBA Europe
- Number of teams: 18
- Level on pyramid: 1
- Relegation to: Primera FEB
- Domestic cup: Copa del Rey
- Supercup: Supercopa de España
- International cup(s): EuroLeague; EuroCup; Champions League; FIBA Europe Cup
- Current champions: Valencia (2nd title) (2025–26)
- Most championships: Barcelona (17 titles)
- All-time top scorer: Alberto Herreros (9,759)
- TV partners: DAZN
- Website: www.acb.com
- 2026–27 ACB season

The Liga ACB, (Note: Spanish: [ˈliɣa aθeˈβe]; "ACB League") known as Liga Endesa (Note: Spanish: [ˈliɣa eŋˈdesa]; "Endesa League") for sponsorship reasons, is the top professional basketball division of the Spanish basketball league system. Administered by the Asociación de Clubs de Baloncesto (ACB), Liga ACB is contested by 18 teams, with the two lowest-placed teams relegated to the Primera FEB and replaced by the top team in that division plus the winner of the promotion playoffs.

The competition was founded as the ACB Primera División on 1983 following the decision of clubs in the Liga Nacional, founded in 1957, to break away from the Spanish Basketball Federation and professionalize the league. The league's revenues were around €40 million in 2025, with DAZN and Endesa contributing 50% of the revenues of the league. The league is a corporation where president Antonio Martín is responsible for its management, whilst the member clubs act as shareholders. Clubs were apportioned central payment revenues of €16 million in 2023–24.

A total of 54 teams have competed in Liga ACB since its inception in 1983. Seven teams have been crowned champions, with FC Barcelona winning the title a record 17 times and Real Madrid 16 times, though Liga ACB also saw other champions, including Baskonia, Joventut Badalona, Valencia Basket, Bàsquet Manresa and Baloncesto Málaga.

Liga ACB is one of the most popular professional indoor sports leagues in the world, with an average attendance of 6,633 for league matches in the 2024–25 season. This is the 10th-highest of any domestic professional indoor sports league in the world and the fifth-highest of any professional basketball league in the world, behind the National Basketball Association (NBA), the EuroLeague, the Women's National Basketball Association (WNBA), and the National Basketball League (NBL).

== Competition format ==
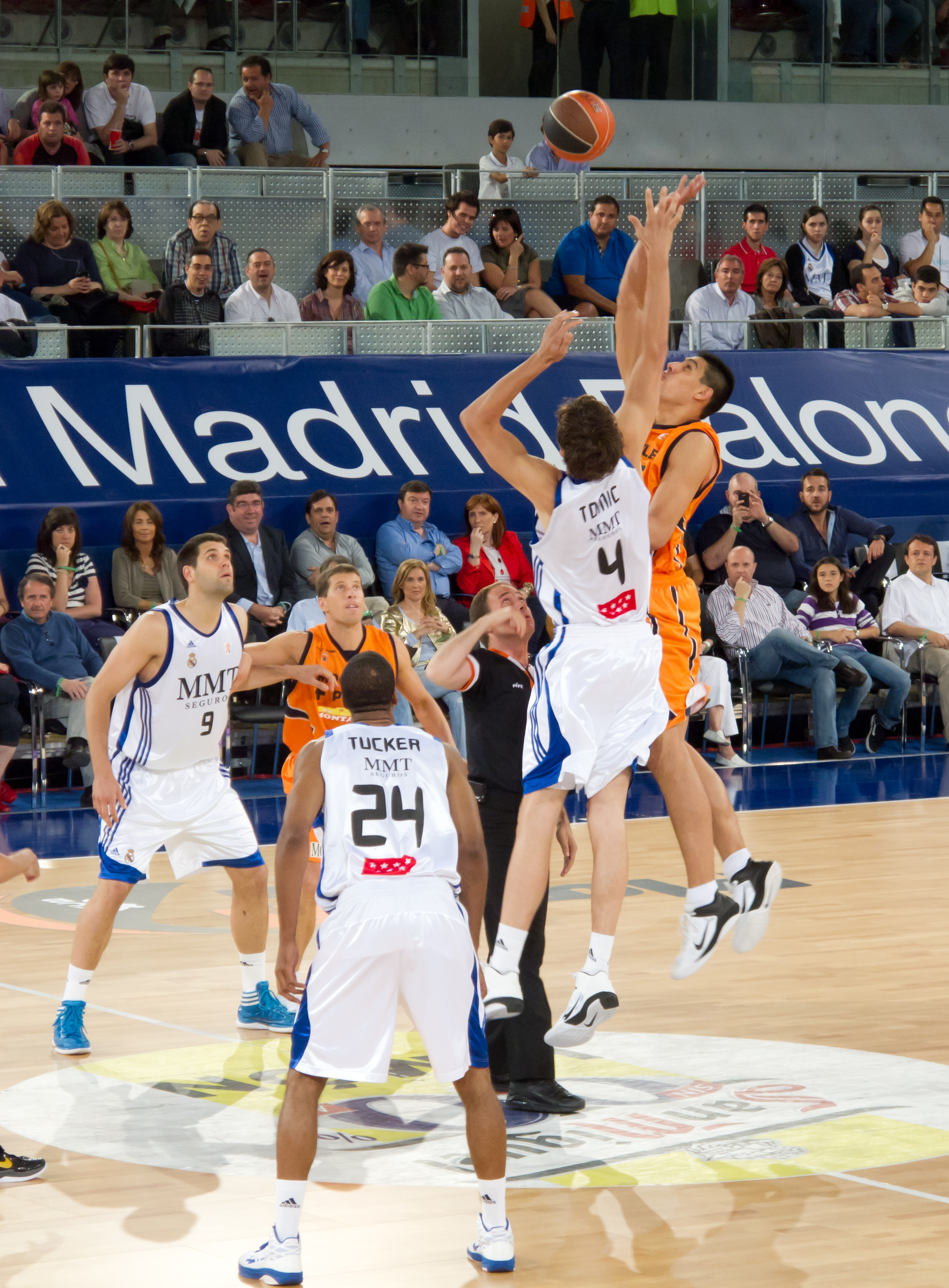
Real Madrid playing against Fuenlabrada

The competition format follows the usual double round-robin format. During the course of a season, which lasts from October to May, each club plays every other club twice, once at home and once away, for a total of 34 games. Teams are ranked by total wins. The eight highest-ranked clubs at the end of the season advance to the playoffs. The winner of the playoffs is crowned champion.

=== Relegation and promotion ===
A system of relegation and promotion exists between the Liga ACB and the Primera FEB. The two lowest placed teams in Liga ACB are relegated to the Primera FEB, and the top team from the Primera FEB promoted to Liga ACB, with an additional club promoted after a series of playoffs involving the second, third, fourth, fifth, sixth, seventh, eighth and ninth placed clubs. Below is a complete record of how many teams played in each season throughout the league's history:

Number of clubs in Liga ACB throughout the years
Period (in years)	No. of clubs	Relegations	Promotions
1983–1986	16 clubs	3 clubs	3 clubs
1986–1988	16 clubs	2 clubs	2 clubs
1988–1992	24 clubs	2 clubs	2 clubs
1992–1993	22 clubs	2 clubs	2 clubs
1993–1996	20 clubs	2 clubs	2 clubs
1996–2008	18 clubs	2 clubs	2 clubs
2008–2009	17 clubs	2 clubs	2 clubs
2009–2016	18 clubs	2 clubs	2 clubs
2016–2017	17 clubs	2 clubs	2 clubs
2017–2020	18 clubs	2 clubs	2 clubs
2020–2021	19 clubs	2 clubs	1 club
2021–present	18 clubs	2 clubs	2 clubs

==== Controversies about promotion to Liga ACB ====
Prior to 2012, in the 29 editions played of the Liga ACB, only three teams declined promotion, due to acting as reserve teams or for lack of funds: CB Guadalajara and CB Cornellà in 1993 and CB Cajabilbao in 1994.

Since 2012, due to the 2008–2014 Spanish financial crisis, only two teams (Canarias and Andorra) of a possible 10 could promote to Liga ACB. This started a discussion about the promotion requirements of the ACB, considered by the LEB Oro clubs as "disproportionate".

For clubs that promote and would make their debut in the ACB demands:

- An arena with a minimum capacity of 5,000 seats.
- An inbound of €3m. For clubs that return to the league after a promotion, an update of the inbound is demanded.
- A deposit of €1.7m that would be returned in case of relegation to LEB Oro. In case of a new promotion, this deposit is required to be restored.
- Conversion into a Sociedad Anónima Deportiva if the club remains in Liga ACB after its first season.

In 2012, Iberostar Canarias and Menorca Bàsquet achieved promotion to ACB, but neither could fulfill the requirements in order to promote. However, Canarias finally played in ACB after buying the berth in the league of Lucentum Alicante, previously sold to the association.

In 2013, neither CB Atapuerca, Ford Burgos by sponsorship reasons, nor Lucentum Alicante could promote. The latter resigned also to play in the second league and joined the fifth division.

In 2014 and 2015, CB Tizona, also Ford Burgos by sponsorship reasons, did not promote despite achieving the place two years in a row. After its second failed promotion, the third in the city of Burgos, the club sued the Association and accused it of "distorting the reality". Also in 2015, despite having played in the league during the 1980s and 1990s, Club Ourense Baloncesto was not admitted into the league despite fulfilling all the requirements, after not passing an accounts audit. However, ACB would admit Ourense for the 2016–17 season if it fulfilled the requirements regardless of their position in the 2015–16 LEB Oro season.

On 24 April 2016, the National Commission of the Markets and the Competence argued that the inbound impedes, in an "unjustified, disproportionate and discriminatory" way, access of new clubs to Liga ACB.

In June 2016, the two promoted teams from LEB Oro (Palencia and Melilla) resigned promotion to the 2016–17 ACB season and requested to the ACB their sign-in before the 2017–18 season. However, as Gipuzkoa Basket, who finished in relegation positions in three of the last four seasons, resigned from ACB, the Association offered again its place to Palencia and Melilla under these conditions:

- An arena with a minimum capacity of 5,000 seats.
- An inbound of €2m. The second million delayed on the dates agreed between the club and ACB.
- A deposit of €1.6m that would be returned in case of relegation to LEB Oro. In case of a new promotion, this deposit is required to be restored.
- Conversion into a Sociedad Anónima Deportiva before the start of their second season in Liga ACB.

Palencia and Mellila refused the invitation, to reinforce their position against the inbound to play in the league.

In April 2017, the National Commission for Markets and Competition declared the entering inbound and the deposit for the regulation of promotions and relegations as illegal, as they consider it "unjustified, discriminatory and excessive" and imposed a fine of €400,000 to the ACB. Subsequently, the ACB replied that it would appeal the decision of the CNMC, contending that it infringed on the self-organizing capacity of professional leagues, as recognized in the Treaty on the Functioning of the European Union and in the European jurisprudence, and which was unprecedented in Europe and in the rest of the world.

In May 2017, the ACB filed a contentious-administrative appeal and request for precautionary measures before the National Court, on the occasion of the resolution of the National Commission for Markets and Competition (CNMC), as well as to refuse any resolution or decision, present or future, which relates to that act. Also, the ACB approved to establish a negotiation plan with the CSD and the FEB regarding the number of participating teams and the conditions to access to the competition in the next seasons.

In June 2017, the ACB agreed not to require the promotion requirements that have been the subject of the resolution (entering inbound and the deposit for the regulation of promotions and relegations) and the participation fee. Also, the ACB agreed to continue negotiations with the CSD, the FEB and the CNMC to try to establish by mutual agreement new conditions for promotion. In view of the possibility of reaching an agreement that establishes economic and financial requirements in a consensual way before 5 July, the Assembly agreed to establish two new access criteria, provided that there was no pronouncement of the National Court on the precautionary measures regarding the resolution of the National Court, nor agreement with the different bodies that replace it. These conditions were:

- A deposit of €1.9m that would be returned in case of relegation to LEB Oro, guaranteeing at least the value contributed by the clubs in their moment of promotion.
- A minimum budget (for all clubs) of €2.3m to play in the league.

On 10 July 2017, the ACB ratified the agreement with the FEB endorsed by the CSD, to change the conditions to make them easier for promoted teams from LEB Oro. The ACB had also reached a principle of agreement with FEB and CSD regarding a reduction of competition to 16 clubs in 2019 and the model of promotions and relegations in the coming seasons. However, this text has not obtained the necessary support of the clubs in the General Assembly and has not been approved, agreeing to continue the negotiations to find the model of competition appropriate to the interests of the teams overall. These new conditions consist of:

- A deposit of €1.6 million, to be paid over four seasons, that would be returned in case of relegation to LEB Oro, guaranteeing at least the value contributed by the clubs in their moment of promotion.
- A minimum budget (for all clubs) of €2 million to play in the league.

Ten days later and two years after the denounce of CB Tizona, Gipuzkoa Basket and CB Miraflores, also from Burgos, were promoted to Liga ACB. These were the first promotions since the Andorra in 2014. Also, Miraflores became the first team to make its debut in ACB since 2009.

=== Ranking of clubs on equal wins ===
If wins are equal between two or more clubs, the rules are:

- If all clubs involved have played each other twice:
  - If the tie is between two clubs, then the tie is broken using the point difference for the two matches those clubs have played against each other
  - If the tie is between more than two clubs, then the tie is broken using the games the clubs have played against each other:
    - a) head-to-head wins
    - b) head-to-head point difference
    - c) head-to-head points scored
- If two legged games between all clubs involved have not been played, or the tie is not broken by the rules above, it is broken using:
  - a) total point difference
  - b) total points scored
- If the tie is still not broken, a new tiebreak process is initiated with only those teams that remain tied.

== History ==
The first basketball league in Spain was the Liga Nacional, organised by the Spanish Basketball Federation, whose first edition was played in 1957 by six teams from Madrid and the province of Barcelona. Until 1983 it continued being organised by the federation and consisting in only a round-robin tournament, where every teams faced all other twice, one at home and one away, with two points per win and one point in case of a draw.

In 1982, the Asociación de Clubs de Baloncesto was founded and one year later took the helm of the organisation of the league, with several changes in the competition format as they introduced the playoffs and the overtimes in case of draw.

=== League names ===
- 1983–1988: ACB Primera División
- 1988–2011: Liga ACB
- 2011–present Liga Endesa

=== Champions ===
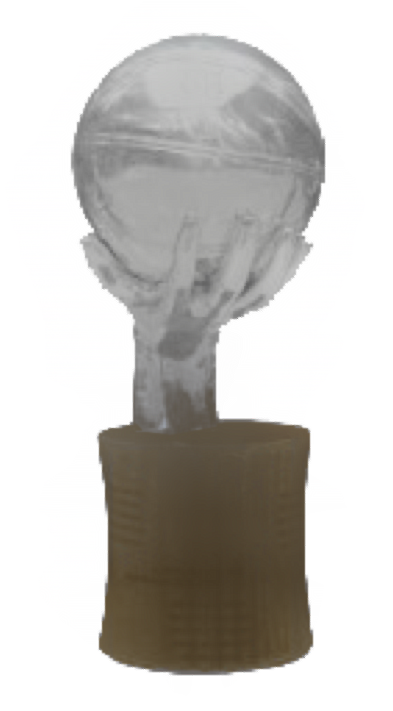
Current Liga ACB trophy

Season	Champion	Runner-up	Series	Finals MVP	Champion's Coach
1983–84	Real Madrid	FC Barcelona	2–1	Not awarded	(Spanish Basketball Federation) Lolo Sainz
1984–85	Real Madrid	Ron Negrita Joventut	2–1	Not awarded	(Spanish Basketball Federation) Lolo Sainz
1985–86	Real Madrid	FC Barcelona	2–0	Not awarded	(Spanish Basketball Federation) Lolo Sainz
1986–87	FC Barcelona	Ron Negrita Joventut	3–1	Not awarded	(Spanish Basketball Federation) Aíto García Reneses
1987–88	FC Barcelona	Real Madrid	3–2	Not awarded	(Spanish Basketball Federation) Aíto García Reneses
1988–89	FC Barcelona	Real Madrid	3–2	Not awarded	(Spanish Basketball Federation) Aíto García Reneses
1989–90	FC Barcelona	RAM Joventut	3–0	Not awarded	(Spanish Basketball Federation) Aíto García Reneses
1990–91	Montigalà Joventut	FC Barcelona	3–1	(United States) Corny Thompson	(Spanish Basketball Federation) Lolo Sainz
1991–92	Montigalà Joventut	Real Madrid Asegurator	3–2	(United States) Mike Smith	(Spanish Basketball Federation) Lolo Sainz
1992–93	Real Madrid Teka	Marbella Joventut	3–2	(Lithuania) Arvydas Sabonis	(USA Basketball) Clifford Luyk
1993–94	Real Madrid Teka	FC Barcelona Banca Catalana	3–0	(Lithuania) Arvydas Sabonis	(USA Basketball) Clifford Luyk
1994–95	FC Barcelona Banca Catalana	Unicaja	3–2	(United States) Michael Ansley	(Spanish Basketball Federation) Aíto García Reneses
1995–96	FC Barcelona Banca Catalana	Caja San Fernando	3–0	(Spain) Xavi Fernández	(Spanish Basketball Federation) Aíto García Reneses
1996–97	FC Barcelona Banca Catalana	Real Madrid Teka	3–2	(Spain) Roberto Dueñas	(Spanish Basketball Federation) Aíto García Reneses
1997–98	TDK Manresa	TAU Cerámica	3–1	(Spain) Joan Creus	(Spanish Basketball Federation) Luis Casimiro
1998–99	FC Barcelona	Caja San Fernando	3–0	(United States) Derrick Alston	(Spanish Basketball Federation) Aíto García Reneses
1999–00	Real Madrid Teka	FC Barcelona	3–2	(Spain) Alberto Angulo	(Italian Basketball Federation) Sergio Scariolo
2000–01	FC Barcelona	Real Madrid Teka	3–0	(Spain) Pau Gasol	(Spanish Basketball Federation) Aíto García Reneses
2001–02	TAU Cerámica	Unicaja	3–0	(United States) Elmer Bennett	(FR Yugoslavia) Duško Ivanović
2002–03	FC Barcelona	Pamesa Valencia	3–0	(Lithuania) Šarūnas Jasikevičius	(Basketball Federation of Serbia and Montenegro) Svetislav Pešić
2003–04	FC Barcelona	Adecco Estudiantes	3–2	(Serbia and Montenegro) Dejan Bodiroga	(Basketball Federation of Serbia and Montenegro) Svetislav Pešić
2004–05	Real Madrid	TAU Cerámica	3–2	(United States) Louis Bullock	(Basketball Federation of Serbia and Montenegro) Božidar Maljković
2005–06	Unicaja	TAU Cerámica	3–0	(Spain) Jorge Garbajosa	(Italian Basketball Federation) Sergio Scariolo
2006–07	Real Madrid	Winterthur FC Barcelona	3–1	(Spain) Felipe Reyes	(Spanish Basketball Federation) Joan Plaza
2007–08	TAU Cerámica	AXA FC Barcelona	3–0	(United States) Pete Mickeal	(Croatian Basketball Federation) Neven Spahija
2008–09	Regal FC Barcelona	TAU Cerámica	3–1	(Spain) Juan Carlos Navarro	(Spanish Basketball Federation) Xavi Pascual
2009–10	Caja Laboral	Regal FC Barcelona	3–0	(Brazil) Tiago Splitter	(Basketball Federation of Montenegro) Duško Ivanović
2010–11	Regal FC Barcelona	Bizkaia Bilbao Basket	3–0	(Spain) Juan Carlos Navarro	(Spanish Basketball Federation) Xavi Pascual
2011–12	FC Barcelona Regal	Real Madrid	3–2	(Slovenia) Erazem Lorbek	(Spanish Basketball Federation) Xavi Pascual
2012–13	Real Madrid	FC Barcelona Regal	3–2	(Spain) Felipe Reyes	(Spanish Basketball Federation) Pablo Laso
2013–14	FC Barcelona	Real Madrid	3–1	(Spain) Juan Carlos Navarro	(Spanish Basketball Federation) Xavi Pascual
2014–15	Real Madrid	FC Barcelona	3–0	(Spain) Sergio Llull	(Spanish Basketball Federation) Pablo Laso
2015–16	Real Madrid	FC Barcelona Lassa	3–1	(Spain) Sergio Llull	(Spanish Basketball Federation) Pablo Laso
2016–17	Valencia Basket	Real Madrid	3–1	(Montenegro) Bojan Dubljević	(Spanish Basketball Federation) Pedro Martínez
2017–18	Real Madrid	Kirolbet Baskonia	3–1	(Spain) Rudy Fernández	(Spanish Basketball Federation) Pablo Laso
2018–19	Real Madrid	Barça Lassa	3–1	(Argentina) Facundo Campazzo	(Spanish Basketball Federation) Pablo Laso
2019–20 (Note: Regular season was cancelled in response to the COVID-19 pandemic and the title was decided in an end-of-season tournament in Valencia.)	Kirolbet Baskonia	Barça	69–67 (Note: The final was played in a single game.)	(Argentina) Luca Vildoza	(Basketball Federation of Montenegro) Duško Ivanović
2020–21	Barça	Real Madrid	2–0	(Spain) Nikola Mirotić	(Lithuanian Basketball Federation) Šarūnas Jasikevičius
2021–22	Real Madrid	Barça	3–1	(Cape Verde) Edy Tavares	(Spanish Basketball Federation) Pablo Laso
2022–23	Barça	Real Madrid	3–0	(Spain) Nikola Mirotić	(Lithuanian Basketball Federation) Šarūnas Jasikevičius
2023–24	Real Madrid	UCAM Murcia	3–0	(Bosnia and Herzegovina) Džanan Musa	(Spanish Basketball Federation) Chus Mateo
2024–25	Real Madrid	Valencia Basket	3–0	(Argentina) Facundo Campazzo	(Spanish Basketball Federation) Chus Mateo
2025–26	Valencia Basket	Barça	3–1	(Dominican Republic) Jean Montero	(Spanish Basketball Federation) Pedro Martínez

==== Titles by club ====
Club	Champions	Runners-up	Winning years
Barcelona	17	15	1987, 1988, 1989, 1990, 1995, 1996, 1997, 1999, 2001, 2003, 2004, 2009, 2011, 2012, 2014, 2021, 2023
Real Madrid	16	10	1984, 1985, 1986, 1993, 1994, 2000, 2005, 2007, 2013, 2015, 2016, 2018, 2019, 2022, 2024, 2025
Baskonia	4	5	2002, 2008, 2010, 2020
Joventut	2	4	1991, 1992
Valencia	2	2	2017, 2026
Málaga	1	2	2006
Manresa	1	0	1998
Real Betis	0	2	
Estudiantes	0	1	
Bilbao	0	1	
UCAM Murcia	0	1	

== Current clubs ==
Location of teams in 2026–27 ACB

Team	Home city	Arena	Capacity
Asisa Joventut	Badalona	Palau Municipal d'Esports	12,760
Barça	Barcelona	Palau Blaugrana	7,786
Casademont Zaragoza	Zaragoza	Pabellón Príncipe Felipe	10,744
FIATC Girona	Girona	Fontajau	5,500
Ilerna Lleida	Lleida	Espai Fruita Barris Nord	6,100
Kids&Us Manresa	Manresa	Nou Congost	5,000
Kosner Baskonia	Vitoria-Gasteiz	Buesa Arena	15,504
La Laguna Tenerife	San Cristóbal de La Laguna	Santiago Martín	5,100
Leyma Coruña	A Coruña	Coliseum da Coruña	9,300
Monbus Obradoiro	Santiago de Compostela	Multiusos Fontes do Sar	6,000
MoraBanc Andorra	Andorra la Vella	Pavelló Toni Martí	5,001
Real Madrid	Madrid	Movistar Arena	13,109
Recoletas Salud San Pablo Burgos	Burgos	Coliseum Burgos	9,604
Río Breogán	Lugo	Pazo dos Deportes	5,310
Surne Bilbao	Bilbao	Bilbao Arena	10,014
UCAM Murcia	Murcia	Palacio de Deportes	7,454
Unicaja	Málaga	Martín Carpena	10,699
Valencia Basket	Valencia	Roig Arena	15,600

== All-time Liga ACB table ==
The all-time Liga ACB table is an overall record of all match results of every team that has played in Liga ACB since the 1983–84 season. The table is accurate as of the end of the 2025–26 season.

Pos	Team	Season	Played	Won	Lost	1st	2nd	3rd	4th	Debut	Since/Last App	Best
1	Barcelona	43	1806	1349	457	17	15	5	2	1983–84	1983–84	1
2	Real Madrid	43	1773	1335	438	16	10	6	2	1983–84	1983–84	1
3	Baskonia	43	1660	1045	615	4	5	5	6	1983–84	1983–84	1
4	Joventut	43	1605	909	696	2	4	7	5	1983–84	1983–84	1
5	Málaga (Note: Includes CB Caja de Ronda results)	41	1554	885	669	1	2	6	7	1983–84	1987–88	1
6	Valencia	37	1410	829	581	2	2	4	3	1988–89	1996–97	1
7	Estudiantes	38	1403	721	682	–	1	5	7	1983–84	2020–21	2
8	Gran Canaria	35	1269	607	662	–	–	–	2	1985–86	1995–96	4
9	Manresa	38	1339	572	767	1	–	–	2	1983–84	2018–19	1
10	Real Betis	33	1171	515	656	–	2	–	–	1989–90	2022–23	2
11	Valladolid	30	1032	432	600	–	–	–	–	1983–84	2013–14	6
12	Murcia	28	981	385	596	–	1	–	–	1990–91	2011–12	2
13	Canarias (Note: Includes old CB Canarias results)	21	746	376	370	–	–	2	1	1983–84	2012–13	3
14	CB Girona	20	731	330	401	–	–	–	–	1988–89	2007–08	5
15	Bilbao	21	729	326	403	–	1	–	–	2004–05	2019–20	2
16	Fuenlabrada	25	852	324	528	–	–	–	–	1996–97	2022–23	7
17	Breogán	23	808	320	488	–	–	–	–	1984–85	2021–22	6
18	CB Zaragoza	13	473	270	203	–	–	2	3	1983–84	1995–96	3
19	Basket Zaragoza	17	583	242	341	–	–	1	1	2008–09	2010–11	3
20	Andorra	15	521	223	298	–	–	–	–	1992–93	2023–24	6
21	León	11	398	179	219	–	–	–	–	1990–91	2007–08	6
22	Peñas	12	441	173	268	–	–	–	–	1983–84	1995–96	10
23	Obradoiro	14	467	171	296	–	–	–	–	2009–10	2023–24	8
24	Granollers	10	352	166	186	–	–	–	–	1983–84	1992–93	5
25	Cáceres	11	388	163	225	–	–	–	–	1992–93	2002–03	5
26	Ourense	10	383	143	240	–	–	–	–	1989–90	2000–01	8
27	CB Granada	12	411	140	271	–	–	–	–	1996–97	2010–11	10
28	OAR Ferrol	10	350	140	210	–	–	–	–	1983–84	1993–94	7
29	Gipuzkoa	12	411	135	276	–	–	–	–	2006–07	2020–21	5
30	Lucentum	9	316	132	184	–	–	–	–	2000–01	2011–12	6
31	Collado Villalba	6	226	93	133	–	–	–	–	1987–88	1991–92	8
32	San Pablo Burgos	6	203	87	116	–	–	–	1	2017–18	2025–26	4
33	Oximesa	6	225	82	143	–	–	–	–	1986–87	1991–92	11
34	Cajabilbao	5	184	76	108	–	–	–	–	1986–87	1990–91	9
35	Maristas Málaga	4	160	76	84	–	–	–	–	1988–89	1991–92	13
36	Espanyol	5	165	73	92	–	–	–	–	1984–85	1988–89	8
37	Lleida	4	140	57	83	–	–	–	–	2001–02	2004–05	8
38	Cantabria	5	170	53	117	–	–	–	–	1997–98	2001–02	14
39	Menorca	5	168	51	117	–	–	–	–	2005–06	2011–12	15
40	Bàsquet Girona	4	136	50	86	–	–	–	–	2022–23	2022–23	12
41	Círcol Catòlic	3	97	49	48	–	–	–	1	1983–84	1985–86	4
42	Cajamadrid	3	98	46	52	–	–	–	–	1983–84	1985–86	5
43	Gijón	4	144	37	107	–	–	–	–	1995–96	2001–02	15
44	Fundación Granada	4	136	37	99	–	–	–	–	2022–23	2022–23	15
45	Salamanca	2	76	36	40	–	–	–	–	1994–95	1995–96	9
46	Tenerife AB	2	89	28	61	–	–	–	–	1988–89	1989–90	22
47	Llíria	2	79	27	52	–	–	–	–	1991–92	1992–93	16
48	Tenerife	2	68	25	43	–	–	–	–	2003–04	2004–05	10
49	Força Lleida	2	68	23	45	–	–	–	–	2024–25	2024–25	14
50	Ciudad de Huelva	1	39	11	28	–	–	–	–	1997–98	1997–98	17
51	L'Hospitalet	1	31	11	20	–	–	–	–	1983–84	1983–84	15
52	Askatuak	1	43	10	33	–	–	–	–	1988–89	1988–89	24
53	Coruña	1	34	7	27	–	–	–	–	2024–25	2024–25	18
54	Palencia	1	34	6	28	–	–	–	–	2023–24	2023–24	18

League or status at 2025–26 season:

2025–26 ACB season
2025–26 Primera FEB
2025–26 Segunda FEB
2025–26 Tercera FEB
Lower divisions
Clubs that no longer exist

== Awards ==
- ACB Most Valuable Player Award
- ACB Finals Most Valuable Player Award
- ACB Best Young Player Award
- All-ACB Team
- ACB Player of the Month Award
- ACB Best Coach
- AEEB Coach of the Year
- ACB contests

== Statistical leaders ==
=== All-time scoring leaders ===
Player nationality set by the player's national team affiliation. In bold, active players. In gold, players with more than 6,000 points, considered by the ACB as historic players.

Stats through end of 2018–19 ACB season:

Rank	Player	Games	Points	Average
1.	(Spain) Alberto Herreros	654	9,759	14.92
2.	(Spain) Jordi Villacampa	506	8,991	17.77
3.	(United States) Brian Jackson	392	8,651	22.07
4.	(Spain) Juan Carlos Navarro	689	8,318	12.07
5.	(Spain) Felipe Reyes	798	8,254	10.34
6.	(United States) Granger Hall	433	8,039	18.57
7.	(Spain) Joan Creus	585	7,929	13.55
8.	(United States) Joe Arlauckas	365	7,543	20.67
9.	(Spain) Álex Mumbrú	677	7,435	10.98
10.	(Croatia) Velimir Perasović	354	7,387	20.87
11.	(Spain) Epi	422	7,029	16.66
12.	(Spain) Darryl Middleton	398	6,425	16.14
13.	(United States) Andre Turner	378	6,405	16.94
14.	(Spain) Rafael Jofresa	756	6,327	8.37
15.	(United States) Richard Scott	350	6,199	17.71
16.	(United States) John Pinone	332	6,175	18.60
17.	(Spain) Bernard Hopkins	456	6,088	13.35
18.	(United States) Claude Riley	308	6,074	19.72
19.	(Spain) Xavi Fernández	499	6,042	12.11
20.	(Spain) Chicho Sibilio	348	6,010	17.27

=== All-time rebounding leaders ===
Player nationality set by the player's national team affiliation. In bold, active players. In gold, players with more than 2,500 rebounds, considered by the ACB as historic players.

Stats through the end of the 2018–19 ACB season:

Rank	Player	Games	Rebounds	Average
1.	(Spain) Felipe Reyes	798	4,665	5.85
2.	(United States) Granger Hall	433	4,292	9.91
3.	(Spain) Carlos Jiménez	641	3,526	5.50
4.	(United States) Claude Riley	308	3,033	9.85
5.	(Spain) Juan Antonio Orenga	616	2,933	4.77
6.	(Lithuania) Arvydas Sabonis	235	2,904	12.36
7.	(Spain) Bernard Hopkins	456	2,806	6.15
8.	**(Spain)** Fran Vázquez	638	2,788	4.37
9.	(Spain) Mike Smith	405	2,755	6.80
10.	(United States) Larry Micheaux	269	2,729	10.14
11.	(Spain) Darryl Middleton	398	2,701	6.79
12.	(United States) Joe Arlauckas	365	2,626	7.19
13.	(Spain) Álex Mumbrú	677	2,499	3,68
14.	(United States) Harper Williams	346	2,493	7.21
15.	(Central African Republic) Anicet Lavodrama	345	2,429	7.04
16.	(Spain) Alfonso Reyes	461	2,417	5.24
17.	(Belgium) Axel Hervelle	473	2,355	4.98
18.	(Croatia) **Ante Tomić**	389	2,341	6.02
19.	(Spain) Ramón Rivas	307	2,290	7.46
20.	(Spain) Ferran Martínez	417	2,287	5.48

== Records ==
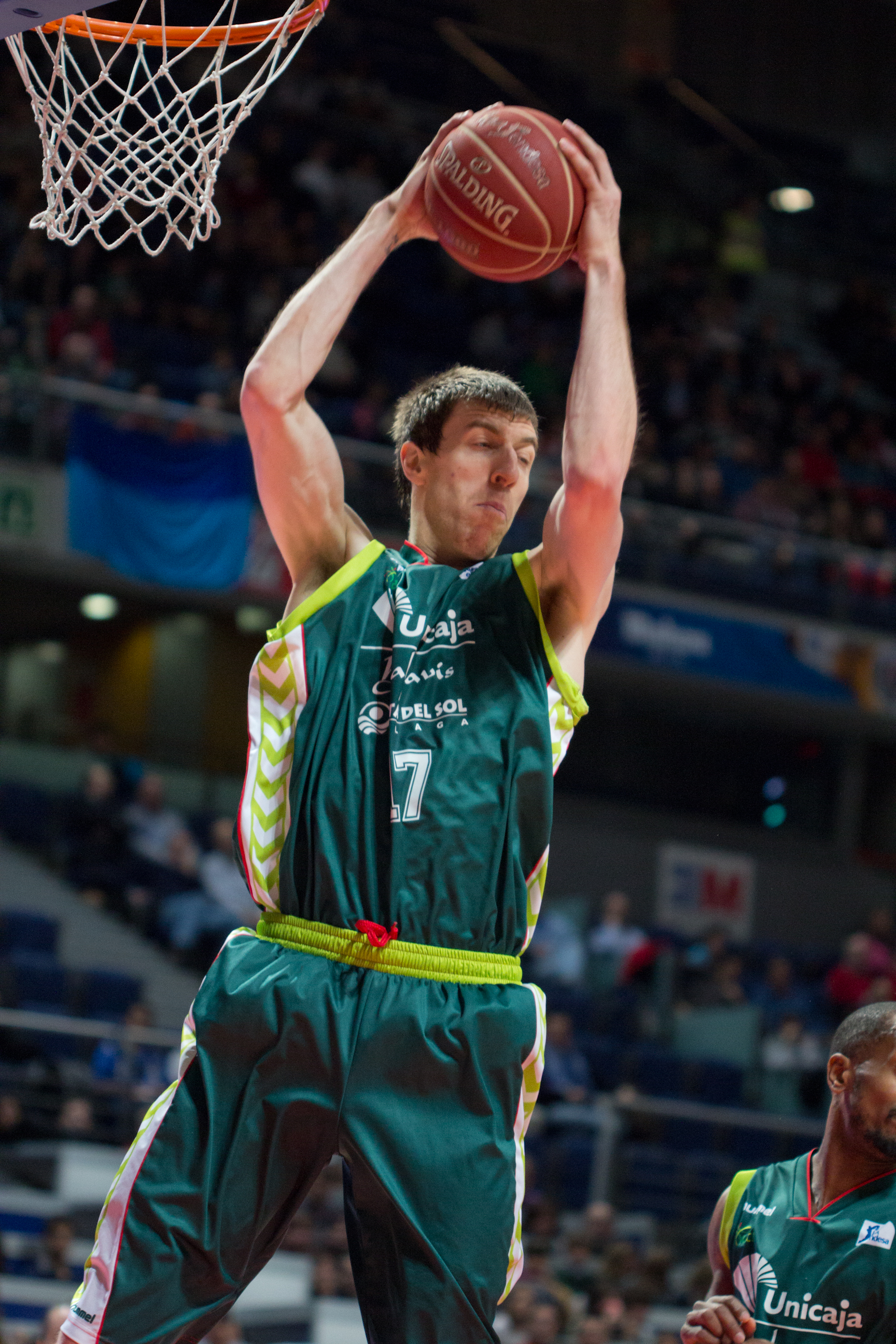
Fran Vázquez holds the record for most blocks in an ACB game, 12

These are the standing ACB records for the regular season (RS) and play-offs (PO).

- Most Points in a game

- RS: 54 by Epi, FC Barcelona vs Joventut Massana on 18 February 1984
- PO: 43 by David Russell, CB Estudiantes vs Real Madrid on 28 March 1987
- Liga Nacional (prior to the 1983–84 season): 65 by Walter Szczerbiak, Real Madrid vs Dyc Breogán on 8 February 1976

- Most Field Goals Made in a game

- RS: 25 by Essie Hollis, Arabatxo Baskonia vs OAR Ferrol on 5 February 1984
- PO: 19 by Chicho Sibilio, FC Barcelona vs OAR Ferrol on 17 March 1984

- Most Three Point Field Goals Made in a game

- RS: 12 by Jacob Pullen, FC Barcelona vs CB Valladolid on 8 March 2014
- PO: 10 by Chicho Sibilio, FC Barcelona vs Breogán Caixa Galicia on 12 April 1986

- Most Free Throws Made in a game

- RS: 29 by Jeff Lamp, Granada vs Fórum Filatélico Valladolid on 21 December 1991
- PO: 19 by José Miguel Antúnez, Estudiantes Caja Postal vs CAI Zaragoza on 19 April 1991

- Most Rebounds in a game

- RS: 29 by Clarence Kea, Juver Murcia vs Dyc Breogán on 21 December 1991
- PO: 21 by Fernando Romay, Real Madrid vs FC Barcelona on 4 April 1987; and by Arvydas Sabonis, Real Madrid Teka vs Valvi Girona on 1 April 1993 & Real Madrid Teka vs Estudiantes Caja Postal on 1 May 1993

- Most Assists in a game

- RS: 19 by Sergio Rodríguez, Real Madrid vs Montakit Fuenlabrada on 11 May 2016
- PO: 13 by Michael Anderson, Caja San Fernando vs TDK Manresa on 22 May 1999; by Andre Turner, Caja San Fernando vs Real Madrid Teka on 7 May 1999; and by Elmer Bennett, TAU Cerámica vs Adecco Estudiantes on 20 May 2001

- Most Steals in a game

- RS: 13 by Lance Berwald, BBV Villalba vs Caja Guipúzcoa on 11 March 1989 (unofficial)
- PO: 14 by Andrés Jiménez, Ron Negrita Joventut vs Real Madrid on 1 May 1985

- Most Blocks in a game

- RS: 12 by Fran Vázquez, FC Barcelona vs Grupo Capitol Valladolid on 7 January 2007
- PO: 8 by George Singleton, TDK Manresa vs Unicaja Polti on 7 April 1994; and by Derrick Alston, TDK Manresa vs Adecco Estudiantes on 8 May 1998

- PER

- RS: 66 by Arvydas Sabonis, Real Madrid vs Coren Ourense on 31 March 1995
- PO: 48 by Dennis Hopson, Banco Natwest Zaragoza vs Marbella Joventut on 18 April 1993

- Prolific Scorers

- Most 50 points RS games in a career: 2 by Eddie Phillips and Henry Turner.
- Most 50 points RS games in a season: 2 by Eddie Phillips in 1986/87 and Henry Turner in 1991/92.

- Most 40 points RS games in a career: 11 by Ray Smith.
- Most 40 points RS games in a season: 7 by Eddie Phillips in 1986/87 and Ray Smith in 1988/89.
- Most 40 points RS games streak: 3 by Eddie Phillips in 1986/87 and Oscar Schmidt in 1993/94.

- Most 30 points RS games in a season: 24 by Walter Berry in 1990/91.
- Most 30 points RS games streak: 13 by Walter Berry in 1990/91 (from stage 4 to stage 16).

- Players with 20 rebounds games

- 12 games: Arvydas Sabonis (9 RS, 3 PO).
- 4 games: Jerome Lane (4 RS)
- 3 games: Tanoka Beard (3 RS) and Ken Johnson (3 RS).
- 2 games: Clarence Kea (2 RS), Warren Kidd (2 RS), Terry White (2 RS) and Claude Riley (2 RS).
- 1 game: Fernando Romay (1 PO), Felipe Reyes (1 RS), Granger Hall (1 RS), Clyde Myers (1 RS) and Greg Foster (1 PO).

- Double-Doubles (d-d)

- All-time RS: 205 by Granger Hall in 387 games, 137 by Arvydas Sabonis in 189 games, 119 by Claude Riley in 278 games, 116 by Larry Micheaux in 235 games, 100 by Tanoka Beard in 168 games
- All-time PO: 37 by Arvydas Sabonis in 46 games, 22 by Granger Hall in 46 games, 20 by Larry Micheaux in 33 games
- Most d-d in a single RS: 33 by Tanoka Beard, 1997–98
- Most d-d in a single PO: 11 by Arvydas Sabonis, 1992–93 & 1993–94
- RS games streak recording a d-d: 17 by Arvydas Sabonis, 1989–90

- Triple-Doubles
  - Luka Dončić with 17 points, 10 rebounds and 10 assists on 9 May 2018
  - Fran Vázquez with 11 points, 10 rebounds and 12 blocks on 7 January 2007
  - Dejan Tomašević with 14 points, 13 rebounds and 10 assists, Pamesa Valencia vs Unicaja on 12 May 2004
  - George Singleton with 23 points, 12 rebounds and 10 blocks on 12 February 1994
  - Nacho Suárez with 10 points, 10 rebounds and 11 assists on stage 13 1990–91; and 15 points, 10 rebounds and 11 assists on stage 19 1990–91
  - Mike Smith with 31 points, 10 rebounds and 10 steals on 21 October 1989
- Most Points in a game

- RS: 147 – FC Barcelona defeated Cajabilbao 147–106 on 31 January 1987

- Fewest Points in a game

- RS: 39 – Lagun Aro GBC was defeated by Blancos de Rueda Valladolid 61–39 on 25 April 2010

- Most Combined Points in a game

- RS: 254 – Real Madrid defeated UCAM Murcia 131–123 on 3 May 2026

- Largest Margin of Victory in a game

- RS: 65 – FC Barcelona Lassa defeated Real Betis Energía Plus 121–56 on 11 April 2018

- Victory with fewest points

- RS: 49 – Assignia Manresa defeated Meridiano Alicante 49–48 on 6 March 2011

== Attendances ==
Since several years ago, the Liga ACB is the European domestic league with the highest average attendance, always surpassing the 6,000 spectators per game since the 2002–03 season.

=== Season averages ===
All averages include playoffs games.

Season	Total gate	Games	Average	Change	High avg.	Team	Low avg.	Team
1995–96	1,984,706	409	4,853		6,757	Estudiantes Argentaria	3,400	Xacobeo 99 Ourense
1996–97	1,692,188	341	4,962	+2.2%	6,517	Estudiantes Argentaria	3,357	Baloncesto Fuenlabrada
1997–98	1,703,784	341	4,996	+0.1%	7,784	Pamesa Valencia	2,826	Ourense Xacobeo 99
1998–99	1,753,105	331	5,296	+6.0%	8,050	Pamesa Cerámica	3,414	Real Madrid Teka
1999–2000	1,766,883	335	5,274	–0.0%	8,603	Pamesa Valencia	3,607	Cantabria Lobos
2000–01	1,705,898	331	5,154	–3.0%	8,425	Unicaja	3,159	Club Ourense Baloncesto
2001–02	1,933,425	332	5,824	+13.0%	12,018	Adecco Estudiantes	3,385	Canarias Telecom
2002–03	2,009,153	332	6,052	+3.9%	11,171	Adecco Estudiantes	3,735	Cáceres CB
2003–04	2,045,619	335	6,106	+0.9%	11,176	Adecco Estudiantes	3,424	Polaris World Murcia
2004–05	2,203,588	336	6,558	+7.4%	11,055	Adecco Estudiantes	3,903	Unelco Tenerife
2005–06	2,108,671	336	6,276	–4.3%	9,733	Unicaja	4,265	Leche Río
2006–07	2,254,576	336	6,710	+6.9%	9,727	Real Madrid	4,528	Akasvayu Girona
2007–08	2,088,989	323	6,467	–3.6%	9,641	MMT Estudiantes	4,184	Akasvayu Girona
2008–09	2,073,773	292	7,102	+9.8%	9,090	TAU Cerámica	4,858	Ricoh Manresa
2009–10	2,135,484	326	6,551	–7.8%	9,765	Bizkaia Bilbao Basket	4,194	CB Murcia
2010–11	2,018,072	324	6,409	–2.2%	9,345	Asefa Estudiantes	4,200	Meridiano Alicante
2011–12	2,171,673	329	6,621	+3.3%	10,412	Asefa Estudiantes	4,424	Assignia Manresa
2012–13	2,077,787	328	6,335	–4.3%	9,971	Laboral Kutxa	3,985	Cajasol
2013–14	2,213,116	329	6,202	–2.0%	9,242	Real Madrid	3,515	CB Valladolid
2014–15	2,091,134	328	6,375	+2.7%	9,406	Real Madrid	3,599	MoraBanc Andorra
2015–16	2,082,234	328	6,387	+1.5%	9,918	Baskonia	4,026	Iberostar Tenerife
2016–17	1,901,826	295	6,456	+1.0%	9,758	Baskonia	3,985	ICL Manresa
2017–18	2,101,755	327	6,427	–0.4%	10,194	Kirolbet Baskonia	3,169	Delteco GBC
2018–19	2,026,760	325	6,236	–3.0%	9,316	San Pablo Burgos	3,283	Delteco GBC
2019–20	1,369,822	205 (Note: Season was curtailed in response to the COVID-19 pandemic, and was finished behind closed doors. These games are not included in the attendance data.)	6,682	+7.1%	9,438	San Pablo Burgos	3,991	MoraBanc Andorra
2020–21	Season played behind closed doors, except play-offs, with limited attendance.							
2021–22	1,572,083 (Note: Matches played until March with limited attendance.)	327	4,808	–28.0% (Note: Compared to 2019–20 season.)	7,870	San Pablo Burgos	2,810	MoraBanc Andorra
2022–23	1,995,370	325	6,140	+27.7%	9,108	Unicaja	4,477	Carplus Fuenlabrada
2023–24	2,094,929	326	6,246	+4.3%	9,933	Unicaja	3,825	MoraBanc Andorra
2024–25	2,155,837	325	6,633	+3.2%	9,940	Unicaja	3,542	MoraBanc Andorra
2025–26	2,268,020	327	6,936	+4.6%	12,240	Valencia Basket	3,471	MoraBanc Andorra

=== Historic average attendances ===
All averages include playoffs games. In the 2021–22, some games were played under limited attendance.

Season	AND	FCB	BKN	BLB	BRE	CAC	CBC	CTB	COR	EST	FUE	GIJ	GBC	GIR BGI	GCA	GRA FGR	HLV	JOV	LEO	LLE FLL	LUC	MGA	MAN	MEN	MIR	MUR	OBR	COB	PAL	PEÑ	BET	RMA	SAL	TFE	VBC	VAD	CBZ BZA
1994–95	3,997	7,504	5,132		3,681	5,021				7,275				4,629				5,837	6,097			4,544	4,090			6,767		4,153		4,021	4,226	5,100	4,316			5,305	5,713
1995–96	3,562	5,896	5,100			4,974				6,757		4,457		4,982	3,989			4,668	5,347			4,881	4,441			6,160		3,400		3,954	4,775	5,640	3,968			5,104	4,890
1996–97		5,913	5,130			4,956				6,517	3,357			4,432	3,889	4,362		6,214	4,886			5,000	4,303			5,197		3,363			4,018	6,229			5,529	4,805	
1997–98		6,088	5,203			4,869		4,258		6,653				4,706	4,100	5,412	3,600	6,301	4,735			5,000	4,620					2,826			4,467	4,686			7,784	4,253	
1998–99		5,766	7,288			4,918		4,096		6,325	4,664			4,453	4,382	6,276		6,128	4,853			5,000	4,700			4,709					5,955	3,414			8,050	3,641	
1999–00		5,316	8,311		3,885	5,349		3,607		7,448	5,045	4,094		4,267	4,278			5,737	4,603			5,368	4,562								5,482	4,113			8,603	3,929	
2000–01		6,248	7,852		5,035	5,218		3,336		6,142	4,574	4,238		4,145	3,835			4,959			3,953	8,425						3,159			4,368	3,861			7,668	4,283	
2001–02		6,152	7,993		5,000	4,715		3,577		12,018	4,902	3,897		4,363	3,385	6,884		5,815		4,916		8,529									4,314	4,200			7,032	4,675	
2002–03		7,385	8,311		5,507	3,735				11,171	4,799			3,840	4,441	5,006		5,208		5,071	4,909	8,547	4,479								6,306	4,459			7,939	4,688	
2003–04		6,889	8,766		5,447					11,176	4,709			4,431	4,199			5,603		5,771	5,137	8,547	4,437			3,424					5,935	4,774		4,094	8,175	5,214	
2004–05		5,451	8,510	5,003	5,424					11,055				4,545	4,208	6,823		5,746		4,899	5,251	9,825	4,803								5,959	10,561		3,903	6,853	5,654	
2005–06		5,143	8,619	5,471	4,265					7,782	4,787			4,997	4,346	6,996		6,306			5,244	9,733	4,874	5,154							5,782	9,139			7,074	5,855	
2006–07		5,375	8,759	6,454						8,800	4,874		9,371	4,528	4,612	7,082		6,439			4,974	9,481		5,235		5,368					5,771	9,727			6,968	5,981	
2007–08		5,009	8,660	5,706						9,641	5,099			4,184	4,782	7,499		7,936	5,285			9,242	4,879	5,311		5,091					5,354	8,878			6,928	6,183	
2008–09		5,091	9,090	7,003						8,963	5,255		8,294		4,924	7,407		7,467				8,950	4,858	5,350		4,925					5,950	8,847			7,529		10,264
2009–10		5,469	9,011	9,345						8,586	5,260		6,698		4,646	6,468		6,361			4,306	8,650	4,585			4,194	5,510				6,194	8,390			7,572	5,530	
2010–11		4,833	8,937	7,868						9,765	5,427		6,049		4,658	5,483		5,506			4,200	9,356	4,209	4,588							5,141	6,458			7,478	4,988	7,600
2011–12		4,898	10,234	8,668						10,412	5,223		7,037		4,606			5,200			4,531	8,426	4,424			5,355	5,241				5,461	8,558			7,952	4,548	7,326
2012–13		4,561	9,750	9,626			4,157			9,023	5,080		6,362		4,666			5,230				6,193	4,276			5,662	5,414				3,985	7,607			7,865	4,894	7,626
2013–14		4,909	9,190	9,097			3,868			7,927	4,860		5,998		5,147			5,449				6,317	4,023			5,584	5,049				4,157	9,242			8,002	3,515	8,010
2014–15	3,599	4,868	8,918	8,855			4,066			7,839	4,993		5,593		6,258			5,931				7,565	4,253			5,968	5,065				4,153	9,406			8,060		7,933
2015–16	4,037	5,074	9,918	9,063			4,026			8,650	5,187		4,114		6,765			4,938				7,340	4,330			5,931	5,264				4,546	8,971			8,210		7,144
2016–17	4,228	4,272	9,758	8,708			4,521			8,356	4,911				6,464			4,975				7,116	3,985			5,637	5,067				4,886	9,072			8,159		7,467
2017–18	4,224	4,790	10,194	8,752			4,660			8,150	5,174		3,169		5,865			4,986				7,238			9,070	5,578	4,982				4,157	8,584			7,254		7,663
2018–19	4,046	5,323	9,147		4,878		4,582			8,611	5,114		3,283		5,263			5,219				7,572	4,705		9,153	5,605	4,903					8,727			7,273		7,904
2019–20	3,991	5,693	8,931	8,500			4,873			9,074	5,179				6,122			5,550				7,768	4,515		9,438	5,510	5,104				5,321	8,086			7,096		9,371
2020–21	Season played under closed doors, except the play-offs, under limited attendance.																																				
2021–22	2,810	5,035	6,773	5,930	4,203		3,465				3,681				4,153			5,751				4,238	3,754		7,870	4,819	4,248				3,933	5,709			4,440		5,162
2022–23		5,975	8,774	7,846	5,058		4,880				4,477			4,929	5,791	6,581		7,119				9,108	4,692			5,315	5,193				4,922	7,560			5,488		5,801
2023–24	3,825	5,614	9,047	8,386	5,158		4,939							4,979	6,448	7,478		6,716				9,933	4,858			6,420	5,213		4,944			8,592			6,235		5,719
2024–25	3,542	5,662	9,546	8,316	5,232		4,980		7,455					4,940	6,608	6,988		6,814		5,318		9,940	4,875			6,198						8,517			6,599		6,617
2025–26	3,471	5,391	8,871	8,427	5,263		4,848							4,933	6,342	6,692		7,070		5,584		9,206	4,785		9,008	6,845						7,693			12,240		6,906
Season	AND	FCB	BKN	BLB	BRE	CAC	CBC	CTB	COR	EST	FUE	GIJ	GBC	GIR BGI	GCA	GRA FGR	HLV	JOV	LEO	LLE FLL	LUC	MGA	MAN	MEN	MIR	MUR	OBR	COB	PAL	PEÑ	BET	RMA	SAL	TFE	VBC	VAD	CBZ BZA

=== Individual game highest attendance ===
Rank	Home team	Score	Away team	Attendance	Arena	Date	Ref
1	Laboral Kutxa Baskonia	86–80	Real Madrid	15,544	Fernando Buesa Arena	3 January 2016	
1	Kirolbet Baskonia	74–91	Real Madrid	15,544	Fernando Buesa Arena	30 December 2018	
3	Kirolbet Baskonia	78–83	Real Madrid	15,512	Fernando Buesa Arena	17 June 2018	
4	Laboral Kutxa	67–66	Real Madrid	15,504	Fernando Buesa Arena	9 April 2012	
4	Baskonia	92–72	Surne Bilbao Basket	15,504	Fernando Buesa Arena	30 September 2023	
6	Cazoo Baskonia	103–89	Unicaja	15,501	Fernando Buesa Arena	30 September 2022	
7	Lagun Aro Bilbao Basket	76–88	TAU Cerámica	15,414	Bizkaia Arena	6 January 2007	
8	Adecco Estudiantes	85–68	FC Barcelona	15,350	Palacio Vistalegre	11 June 2004	
9	Caja Laboral	66–76	Real Madrid	15,219	Fernando Buesa Arena	31 May 2012	
10	Cazoo Baskonia	84–91	Barça	15,208	Fernando Buesa Arena	14 May 2023	

== Other competitions ==
- Spanish King's Cup
- Spanish Supercup
- Liga de Verano ACB
