= Lolo Sainz =

Spanish basketball player and coach

Personal information
- Born: 28 August 1940 (age 86) Tetuan, Spain (now Morocco)
- Listed height: 6 ft 1.25 in (1.86 m)
- Listed weight: 175 lb (79 kg)

Career information
- Playing career: 1959–1969
- Position: Point guard / shooting guard
- Number: 7
- Coaching career: 1969–2001

Career history

Playing
- 1959–1960: Hesperia
- 1960–1969: Real Madrid

Coaching
- 1969–1972: Real Madrid (juniors)
- 1971–1972: Real Madrid (assistant)
- 1972–1973: Club Vallehermoso Madrid
- 1973–1975: Real Madrid (assistant)
- 1975–1990: Real Madrid
- 1989–1990: Real Madrid (GM)
- 1990–1993: Joventut Badalona
- 1993–2001: Spain
- 2001–2002: Spain (GM)
- 2002–2005: Real Madrid (GM)

Career highlights
- As a player: 2× FIBA International Christmas Tournament champion (1967, 1968); 4× EuroLeague champion (1964, 1965, 1967, 1968); 8× Spanish League champion (1960–1966, 1968); 5× Spanish King's Cup winner (1961, 1962, 1965–1967); Spanish King's Cup Finals Top Scorer (1965); As an assistant coach: 4× FIBA International Christmas Tournament champion (1970, 1972, 1973, 1974); EuroLeague champion (1974); 4× Spanish League champion (1971, 1972, 1974, 1975); 4× Spanish Kings's Cup winner (1971, 1972, 1974, 1975); As a head coach: 4× FIBA Intercontinental Cup champion (1976–1978, 1981); 9× FIBA International Christmas Tournament champion (1975, 1976, 1977, 1978, 1980, 1981, 1985, 1986, 1987); 3× European Club Super Cup (1984, 1988, 1989); 2× EuroLeague champion (1978, 1980); 2× FIBA European Selection (1980, 1996); FIBA EuroStar (1997); 50 Greatest EuroLeague Contributors (2008); 2× FIBA Saporta Cup champion (1984, 1989); FIBA Korać Cup champion (1988); 10× Spanish League champion (1976, 1977, 1979, 1980, 1982, 1984–1986, 1991, 1992); 4× Spanish King's Cup winner (1977, 1985, 1986, 1989); Spanish Supercup winner (1985); Spanish Prince's Cup winner (1990); 3× Catalan League champion (1990, 1991, 1992); 3× AEEB Spanish Coach of the Year (1977, 1985, 1991); Spanish Basketball Hall of Fame (2022); As a General Manager: 2× FIBA International Christmas Tournament champion (2003, 2004); Spanish League champion (2005)
Medals
Men's basketball
Head Coach for Spain
FIBA EuroBasket
Silver medal – second place	1999 France

Manuel "Lolo" Sainz Márquez (born 28 August 1940) is a Spanish retired professional basketball player and coach. Sainz spent most of his career with Real Madrid, either as a player, or a head coach. He did however, also coach the senior Spain national team, between 1993 and 2001. On 3 February 2008, he was chosen as one of the 50 Greatest EuroLeague Contributors, over the previous half-century, by the EuroLeague Basketball Experts Committee.

== Playing career ==
=== Clubs ===
As a player with Real Madrid, Sainz won 4 FIBA European Champions Cup (now called EuroLeague) titles (1964, 1965, 1967, 1968).

=== Spanish senior national team ===
As a player, Sainz was a member of the senior Spain national basketball team. With Spain, he played at the EuroBasket 1961, the 1963 EuroBasket, and the 1965 EuroBasket.

== Coaching career ==
=== Clubs ===
As a head coach with Real Madrid, Sainz won 2 FIBA European Champions Cup (now called EuroLeague) titles (1978, 1980). He was the AEEB Spanish Coach of the Year in 1977, 1985, and 1991.

=== National team career ===
Sainz was also the head coach of the senior Spanish national team, between 1993 and 2001. He led Spain to a silver medal at the 1999 EuroBasket.

== See also ==
- List of EuroLeague-winning head coaches
