= 1960–61 Liga Española de Baloncesto =

1960–61 Liga Españolade Baloncesto
- League: Liga Nacional
- Sport: Basketball
- Number of teams: 12

Regular Season
- Season champions: Real Madrid
- Top scorer: (Spain) Francisco Llobet (ORI)

ACB seasons
- ← 1959–60 1961–62 →

The 1960–61 season was the 5th season of the Liga Española de Baloncesto. R. Madrid won their title.

== Teams and venues ==
Team	Home city
Real Madrid CF	Madrid
CB Orillo Verde	Sabadell
CF Barcelona	Barcelona
Club Juventud	Badalona
CB Aismalíbar	Moncada
Club Águilas	Bilbao
CB Estudiantes	Madrid
Canoe NC	Madrid
CD Iberia	Zaragoza
RCD Español	Barcelona
Real Zaragoza CF	Zaragoza
UD Montgat	Montgat

== League table ==
Pos	Team	Pld	W	D	L	PF	PA	PD	Pts	Qualification or relegation
1	Real Madrid (C)	22	21	0	1	1592	1154	+438	42	Qualification to FIBA European Champions Cup
2	Orillo Verde (Note: Orillo Verde withdrew at the end of the season) (R)	22	15	0	7	1412	1244	+168	30	Withdraw
3	Barcelona (Note: Barcelona withdrew at the end of the season) (R)	22	15	0	7	1210	1177	+33	30	Withdraw
4	Juventud	22	14	0	8	1261	1161	+100	28	
5	Aismalíbar	22	12	2	8	1243	1105	+138	26	
6	Águilas	22	13	0	9	1195	1179	+16	26	
7	Estudiantes	22	10	2	10	1248	1233	+15	22	
8	Real Canoe	22	10	0	12	1327	1359	−32	20	
9	Iberia	22	9	1	12	1200	1394	−194	19	
10	Español	22	6	0	16	1071	1148	−77	12	
11	Zaragoza (R)	22	2	1	19	1128	1417	−289	5	Relegation playoffs
12	Montgat (R)	22	2	0	20	1074	1390	−316	4	Relegation playoffs

Source: Linguasport^{[usurped]}
(C) Champions; (R) Relegated

== Relegation playoffs ==
Team 1	Series	Team 2	Game 1	Game 2	Game 3
Zaragoza	1–2	Agromán	60–65	50–45	52–58
Montgat	w/o	Picadero			

== Individual statistics ==
=== Points ===
Rank	Name	Team	Games	Points	PPG
1	(Spain) Francisco Llobet	Orillo Verde	22	450	20.4
2	(United States) John Arrillaga	Águilas	22	439	19.9
3	(Spain) Nino Buscató	Aismalíbar	22	390	17.7
4	(Spain) José María Soro	Orillo Verde	22	379	17.2
5	(Spain) Adolfo Beneyto	Real Canoe	22	369	16.8
