= Madrid basketball derby =

- Location: (Community of Madrid) Madrid
- Teams: Estudiantes; Real Madrid
- First meeting: Real Madrid 51–38 Estudiantes; Exhibition game (5 March 1950)
- Latest meeting: Movistar Estudiantes 65–79 Real Madrid; 2020–21 ACB (7 February 2021)
- Stadiums: Movistar Arena

Statistics
- Total meetings: 208
- Most wins: Real Madrid (155)
- Largest victory: Real Madrid 116–57 Estudiantes; 1970–71 Liga Nacional (6 December 1970)

The Madrid basketball derby (Spanish: Derbi madrileño), is the name given to the basketball matches between Estudiantes and Real Madrid, both from the city of Madrid. Both teams currently share their home arena, the Palacio de Deportes de la Comunidad de Madrid.

Until 2021, Estudiantes and Real Madrid, along with Joventut, were the only teams that had played all the seasons in the top tier. However, Estudiantes was relegated to LEB Oro after finishing 18th in the 2020–21 ACB season.

== History ==
=== First matches ===
The first match between both teams was played on 5 March 1950 at Fiesta Alegre fronton, as part of the CAVE Cup. Real Madrid won the match by 51–38. Five days later, Real Madrid won again by 35–30.

Estudiantes won their first derby on 14 January 1952, by beating the merengues 31–29.

=== The Liga Nacional and the Cup finals ===
In 1957, both clubs became the founders of the new national league and were two of the six teams that played its inaugural season. Real Madrid won its first edition. All matches played in Madrid were hosted at the Fiesta Alegre fronton. Real Madrid won the first match by 76–61 and Estudiantes, the second one by 68–63.

On 6 May 1962, Real Madrid defeated Estudiantes in the final of the Copa del Generalísimo, played in Barcelona, by 80–66. However, Estudiantes took revenge in the next edition and achieved their first title with a 64–60 win at Frontón Urumea in San Sebastián.

Real Madrid lost the 1966–67 Liga Nacional in favour of Juventud de Badalona, after losing in the last round against Estudiantes, with a buzzer-beater by Emilio Segura.

Another cup match played on 16 March 1972, became the first draw in a derby as it ended 73–73.

Estudiantes and Real Madrid would meet in two more finals played in 1973 and 1975. Real Madrid defeated Estu widely in both matches by 123–79, the highest win in a final at that moment, and 114–85 respectively.

The second draw took place on 9 November 1980, a 94–94 game in the 1980–81 season, where Estudiantes finished as runner-up.

In 1983, both clubs would be founding members of the Asociación de Clubs de Baloncesto, an association that would organise the Liga ACB, to replace the Liga Nacional.

On 28 March 1987, Estu and Real met in the quarterfinals of the 1986–87 ACB season. In the second match of the series, Estudiantes won by 123–115 after playing three overtimes.

=== 1990s: Alberto Herreros' transfer ===
On 17 December 1992, both clubs met for the first time in a European competition. As part of the 1992–93 FIBA European League group stage, Real Madrid won 73–69. The Whites also won the second leg by 71–79.

On 14 September 1996, Real Madrid signed Estudiantes' captain Alberto Herreros by paying 230 million pesetas. Estu supporters started to refer to him as a "traitor", after he said he left the club "to be able to win titles".

New European derbies were played during the 1997–98 EuroLeague. Real Madrid won the first match by 75–64 and Estudiantes the second by 68–65, finally achieving the blues the qualification to the round of 16 two weeks later.

=== 2000s: League semifinals and the brawl in 2004 ===
On 3 October 2004, Real Madrid won an opening league match by 86–77. That match was famous due to a brawl where Rubén Garcés kicked Alberto Herreros.

== Head-to-head statistics ==
As of 15 February 2021

| Competition | GP | EST | D | RMB |
|---|---|---|---|---|
| Liga Nacional | 60 | 8 | 1 | 51 |
| Liga ACB | 81 | 22 | 0 | 59 |
| ACB Playoffs | 33 | 14 | 0 | 19 |
| Copa del Rey | 26 | 5 | 1 | 20 |
| EuroLeague | 6 | 2 | 0 | 4 |
| ULEB Cup | 2 | 0 | 0 | 2 |
| Total in all games | 208 | 51 | 2 | 155 |

== See also ==
- Torneo Comunidad de Madrid
- Madrid derby
