= 1961–62 Liga Española de Baloncesto =

1961–62 Liga Españolade Baloncesto
- League: Liga Nacional
- Sport: Basketball
- Number of teams: 10

Regular Season
- Season champions: Real Madrid
- Top scorer: (United States) Wayne Hightower (RMD)

ACB seasons
- ← 1960–61 1962–63 →

The 1961–62 season was the 6th season of the Liga Española de Baloncesto. R. Madrid won their title.

== Teams and venues ==
Team	Home city
Real Madrid CF	Madrid
Club Juventud	Badalona
CB Estudiantes	Madrid
Picadero JC	Barcelona
RCD Español	Barcelona
Club Águilas	Bilbao
CB Aismalíbar	Moncada
Club Agromán	Madrid
Canoe NC	Madrid
CD Iberia	Zaragoza

== League table ==
Pos	Team	Pld	W	L	PF	PA	PD	Pts	Qualification or relegation
1	Real Madrid (C)	18	18	0	1436	871	+565	36	Qualification to FIBA European Champions Cup
2	Juventud	18	13	5	1178	1031	+147	31	
3	Estudiantes	18	10	8	1148	979	+169	28	
4	Picadero	18	10	8	1140	998	+142	28	
5	Español (Note: Español withdrew at the end of the season. One point deducted after sanction) (R)	18	10	8	1036	988	+48	27	Withdraw
6	Águilas	18	9	9	928	1003	−75	27	
7	Aismalíbar	18	9	9	1035	1000	+35	27	
8	Agromán	18	6	12	845	979	−134	24	
9	Real Canoe (Note: Real Canoe avoid relegation playoffs after a League expansion)	18	4	14	866	1164	−298	22	Relegation playoffs
10	Iberia (Note: Iberia withdrew at the end of the season) (R)	18	1	17	762	1361	−599	19	Relegation playoffs

Source: Linguasport^{[usurped]}
(C) Champions; (R) Relegated

== Stats Leaders ==
=== Points ===
Rank	Name	Team	Pts
1.	Wayne Hightower	RMD	355
2.	Emiliano Rodríguez	RMD	347
3.	José Ramón Ramos	EST	320
4.	Alfonso Martínez	JUV	315
5.	Nino Buscató	AIS	303

== Notes ==
1. Espanyol was docked 1 point
2. Espanyol withdrawn, UD Montgat promoted.
3. Iberia withdrawn, Tritones promoted.
