= 1958–59 Liga Española de Baloncesto =

Liga Española de Baloncesto
- Season: 1958–59
- Games played: 132
- Teams: 12

Finals
- Champions: Barcelona (1st title)
- Runners-up: Real Madrid

Statistical leaders
Points	Johnny Báez	20.2

Records
- Biggest home win: Barcelona 84–37 Iberia (7 March 1959)
- Biggest away win: Real Canoe 43–84 Orillo Verde (25 January 1959)
- Highest scoring: Real Madrid 84–69 Estudiantes (14 December 1958)
- Winning streak: 13 games Barcelona
- Losing streak: 10 games Real Canoe

The 1958–59 season was the third season of the Liga Española de Baloncesto. Barcelona won their title.

== Teams ==
=== Venues and locations ===
Team	Home city	Arena	Capacity
Águilas	Bilbao	Pabellón de la Industria Pesada	—
Aismalíbar	Montcada i Reixac	Palacio de los Deportes	8,000
Barcelona	Barcelona	Palacio de los Deportes	8,000
Español	Barcelona	Palacio de los Deportes	8,000
Estudiantes	Madrid	Fiesta Alegre	3,500
Hesperia	Madrid	Fiesta Alegre	3,500
Iberia	Zaragoza	Frontón Aragonés	—
Juventud	Badalona	La Plana	—
La Salle Josepets	Barcelona	Palacio de los Deportes	8,000
Orillo Verde	Sabadell	Palacio de los Deportes	8,000
Real Canoe	Madrid	Fiesta Alegre	3,500
Real Madrid	Madrid	Fiesta Alegre	3,500

== League table ==
Pos	Team	Pld	W	D	L	PF	PA	PD	Pts	Qualification or relegation
1	Barcelona (C)	22	20	0	2	1313	1102	+211	40	Qualification to FIBA European Champions Cup
2	Real Madrid	22	19	0	3	1365	1113	+252	38	
3	Juventud	22	17	0	5	1231	1009	+222	34	
4	Orillo Verde	22	14	0	8	1221	1065	+156	28	
5	Aismalíbar	22	13	0	9	1135	1050	+85	26	
6	Estudiantes	22	12	2	8	1141	1115	+26	26	
7	Español	22	9	0	13	1177	1258	−81	18	
8	Hesperia	22	8	1	13	1310	1228	+82	17	
9	Iberia	22	8	0	14	1089	1258	−169	16	
10	La Salle Josepets (R)	22	4	2	16	1082	1251	−169	10	Relegation playoffs
11	Águilas (R)	22	3	0	19	1014	1325	−311	6	Relegation playoffs
12	Real Canoe (O)	22	2	1	19	1019	1323	−304	5	Relegation playoffs

Source: Linguasport^{[usurped]}
(C) Champions; (O) Play-off winners; (R) Relegated

== Relegation playoffs ==
Team 1	Series	Team 2	Game 1	Game 2	Game 3
Montgat	2–0	La Salle Josepets	48–40	40–39	
Helios	2–0	Águilas	63–48	59–53	
Real Canoe	2–0	Fiesta Alegre	47–33	69–57	

== Individual statistics ==
=== Points ===
Rank	Name	Team	Games	Points	PPG
1	(Puerto Rico) Johnny Báez	Real Madrid	22	445	20.2
2	(Spain) Emiliano Rodríguez	Aismalíbar	22	381	17.3
3	(Puerto Rico) Pete Reimer	Español	22	359	16.3
4	(Spain) Alfonso Martínez	Barcelona	22	349	15.9
5	(Spain) José María Soro	Orillo Verde	22	332	15.1
