= Joaquín Hernández (basketball) =

Spanish basketball player and coach

Personal information
- Born: 5 February 1933 Bilbao, Spain
- Died: 20 January 1965 (aged 31) Madrid, Spain
- Listed height: 6 ft 1.75 in (1.87 m)

Career information
- Playing career: 1950–1960
- Position: Point guard
- Number: 7
- Coaching career: 1959–1964

Career history

Playing
- 1950–1952: Royal Racing Club de Bruxelles
- 1952–1955: Espanyol Bàsquet
- 1955–1959: Real Madrid
- 1959–1960: Hesperia Madrid
- 1960–1962: Real Canoe NC

Coaching
- 1959–1960: Hesperia Madrid
- 1960–1962: Real Canoe NC
- 1962–1964: Real Madrid
- 1962–1964: Spain

Career highlights
- As player: 2× Spanish League champion (1957, 1958); 2× Spanish Cup winner (1956, 1957); As head coach: EuroLeague champion (1964); 2× Spanish League champion (1963, 1964)
Medals
Men's basketball
Representing Spain
Mediterranean Games
Gold medal – first place	1955 Spain
Head coach for Spain
Mediterranean Games
Silver medal – second place	1963 Italy

Joaquín Hernández Gallego (born 5 February 1933 – 20 January 1965) was a Spanish basketball player and coach.

== Club career ==
Hernández played with the Spanish club Espanyol Bàsquet, from 1951 to 1955. After that, he played with Real Madrid. As a member of Real Madrid, he won 2 Spanish League championships, in 1957 and 1958, and also 2 Spanish Kings's Cups, in 1956 and 1957.

== National team career ==
Hernández played internationally with the senior Spanish men's national basketball team, in 41 games. He won the gold medal at the 1955 Mediterranean Games. He also played at the EuroBasket 1959.

== Coaching career ==
After retirement he continued in 1960 in the sport as a basketball coach. He became the head coach of Real Madrid in 1962, and with them he won 2 Spanish League championships, in 1963 and 1964. He also won the premier European-wide competition, the FIBA European Champions Cup (now called EuroLeague) championship, of the 1963–64 season.

Hernández was also the head coach of the senior Spanish national team. He coached Spain at the EuroBasket 1963, and he also led them to the silver medal at the 1963 Mediterranean Games.

== Personal life ==
Hernández died at age 31, in Madrid, Spain, on 20 January 1965, from liver disease.

== See also ==
- List of EuroLeague-winning head coaches
