= 1959–60 Liga Española de Baloncesto =

Liga Española de Baloncesto
- Season: 1959–60
- Games played: 132
- Teams: 12

Finals
- Champions: Real Madrid (3rd title)
- Runners-up: Juventud

Statistical leaders
Points	Alfonso Martínez	20.2

Records
- Biggest home win: Real Madrid 78–25 Estudiantes (5 December 1959)
- Biggest away win: Helios 36–70 Real Madrid (13 February 1960)
- Highest scoring: Real Madrid 84–70 Barcelona (6 March 1960)
- Winning streak: 12 games Real Madrid

The 1959–60 season was the 4th season of the Liga Española de Baloncesto. R. Madrid won their title.

== Teams ==
=== Venues and locations ===
Team	Home city	Arena	Capacity
Aismalíbar	Montcada i Reixac	Palacio de los Deportes	8,000
Barcelona	Barcelona	Palacio de los Deportes	8,000
Español	Barcelona	Palacio de los Deportes	8,000
Estudiantes	Madrid	Fiesta Alegre	3,500
Helios	Zaragoza	Pabellón Polideportivo	—
Hesperia	Madrid	Fiesta Alegre	3,500
Iberia	Zaragoza	Frontón Aragonés	—
Juventud	Badalona	La Plana	—
Montgat	Montgat	Pabellón Municipal	—
Orillo Verde	Sabadell	Palacio de los Deportes	8,000
Real Canoe	Madrid	Fiesta Alegre	3,500
Real Madrid	Madrid	Fiesta Alegre	3,500

== League table ==
Pos	Team	Pld	W	D	L	PF	PA	PD	Pts	Qualification or relegation
1	Real Madrid (C)	22	20	0	2	1497	1047	+450	40	Qualification to FIBA European Champions Cup
2	Juventud	22	16	1	5	1298	1117	+181	33	
3	Orillo Verde	22	16	0	6	1235	1166	+69	32	
4	Aismalíbar	22	14	1	7	1230	1065	+165	29	
5	Hesperia (Note: Hesperia withdrew at the end of the season) (R)	22	14	1	7	1337	1226	+111	29	Withdraw
6	Barcelona	22	11	0	11	1383	1273	+110	22	
7	Iberia	22	9	0	13	1096	1267	−171	18	
8	Montgat (O)	22	8	0	14	1132	1217	−85	16	Relegation playoffs
9	Español (O)	22	7	1	14	1080	1252	−172	15	Relegation playoffs
10	Estudiantes (Note: Estudiantes avoid relegation playoffs after Helios withdrawal)	22	6	2	14	1146	1263	−117	14	Relegation playoffs
11	Helios (Note: Helios withdrew at the end of the season and Estudiantes avoid relegation playoffs) (R)	22	4	1	17	1051	1355	−304	9	Relegation playoffs
12	Real Canoe (Note: Real Canoe avoid relegation after Hesperia withdrawal)	22	3	1	18	1173	1410	−237	7	Relegation

Source: Linguasport^{[usurped]}
(C) Champions; (O) Play-off winners; (R) Relegated

== Relegation playoffs ==
=== League table ===
Pos	Team	Pld	W	D	L	PF	PA	PD	Pts	Promotion or relegation
1	Montgat (O)	6	5	0	1	339	259	+80	10	Remained at Liga Española de Baloncesto
2	Español (O)	6	5	0	1	352	306	+46	10	Remained at Liga Española de Baloncesto
3	Mollet	6	3	0	3	295	357	−62	6	
4	Picadero	6	0	0	6	261	325	−64	0	

Source: Linguasport^{[usurped]}
(O) Play-off winners

== Individual statistics ==
=== Points ===
Rank	Name	Team	Games	Points	PPG
1	(Spain) Alfonso Martínez	Barcelona	16	323	20.2
2	(Puerto Rico) Johnny Báez	Real Madrid	22	439	19.9
3	(Spain) Emiliano Rodríguez	Aismalíbar	22	394	17.9
4	(United States) Travis Montgomery	Real Madrid	22	361	16.4
5	(Spain) Adolfo Beneyto	Real Canoe	22	338	15.4

== Notes ==
1. Hesperia withdrawn, farm club of Real Madrid, and Canoe NC not relegated.
2. Helios withdrawn, Zaragoza was promoted.
