= 1963–64 Liga Española de Baloncesto =

1963–64 Liga Nacional de Baloncesto
- League: Liga Nacional
- Sport: Basketball
- Duration: 3 November 1963 – 19 April 1964
- Teams: 14

Regular Season
- Season champions: Real Madrid

ACB seasons
- ← 1962–63 1964–65 →

The 1963–64 season was the 8th season of the Liga Nacional de Baloncesto. Real Madrid won the title.

== Teams and venues ==
Team	Home city
Real Madrid CF	Madrid
Club Juventud	Badalona
CB Estudiantes	Madrid
Picadero JC	Barcelona
CN Helios	Zaragoza
Club Águilas	Bilbao
CB Aismalíbar	Moncada
Club Agromán	Madrid
Canoe NC	Madrid
CD Layetano	Barcelona
CD Mataró	Mataró
CF Barcelona	Barcelona
UD Montgat	Montgat
Sevilla CF	Seville

== First stage ==
=== Group A ===
==== League table ====
Pos	Team	Pld	W	L	PF	PA	PD	Pts	Qualification or relegation
1	Real Madrid	12	11	1	1098	679	+419	23	Qualification to final stage
2	Estudiantes	12	9	3	773	630	+143	21	Qualification to final stage
3	Águilas	12	6	6	681	791	−110	18	Qualification to final stage
4	Sevilla (R)	12	5	7	679	724	−45	17	Relegation playoffs
5	Helios (Note: Helios avoid relegation after Aismilíbar withdrawal)	12	5	7	643	708	−65	17	Relegation playoffs
6	Real Canoe (O)	12	5	7	736	807	−71	17	Relegation playoffs
7	Agromán (R)	12	1	11	558	829	−271	13	Relegation

Source: Linguasport
(O) Play-off winners; (R) Relegated

=== Group B ===
==== League table ====
Pos	Team	Pld	W	L	PF	PA	PD	Pts	Qualification or relegation
1	Aismalíbar	12	10	2	854	671	+183	22	Qualification to final stage
2	Picadero	12	7	5	781	679	+102	19	Qualification to final stage
3	Juventud	12	7	5	779	744	+35	19	Qualification to final stage
4	Montgat (R)	12	6	6	681	684	−3	18	Relegation playoffs
5	Mataró (O)	12	5	7	721	749	−28	17	Relegation playoffs
6	Barcelona (R)	12	4	8	641	732	−91	16	Relegation playoffs
7	Layetano (R)	12	3	9	613	811	−198	15	Relegation

Source: Linguasport
(O) Play-off winners; (R) Relegated

== Final stage ==
=== League table ===
Pos	Team	Pld	W	L	PF	PA	PD	Pts	Qualification or relegation
1	Real Madrid (C)	10	8	2	822	658	+164	18	Qualification to FIBA European Champions Cup
2	Picadero	10	6	4	662	589	+73	16	
3	Juventud	10	6	4	619	615	+4	16	
4	Aismalíbar (Note: Aismalíbar withdrew at the end of the season) (R)	10	5	5	611	612	−1	15	Withdraw
5	Estudiantes	10	4	6	618	699	−81	14	
6	Águilas	10	1	9	561	720	−159	11	

Source: Linguasport
(C) Champions; (R) Relegated

== Relegation playoffs ==
Teams qualified between 4th and 6th played the relegation playoffs. Only two teams remained in the league: Canoe NC and CD Mataró.

== Stats Leaders ==
=== Points ===
Rank	Name	Team	Points	Games	PPG
1.	Emiliano Rodríguez	RMA	499	22	22.68
2.	Alfonso Martínez	PIC	373	22	16.95
