= 1957 Liga Española de Baloncesto =

Basketball season

Liga Española de Baloncesto
- Season: 1957
- Games played: 30
- Teams: 6

Finals
- Champions: Real Madrid (1st title)
- Runners-up: Barcelona

Statistical leaders
| Points | Alfonso Martínez | 18.0 |

Records
- Biggest home win: Real Madrid 73–41 Aismalíbar (5 May 1957)
- Biggest away win: Juventud 49–80 Real Madrid (18 May 1957)
- Highest scoring: Estudiantes 78–74 Juventud (13 April 1957)
- Winning streak: 7 games Barcelona
- Losing streak: 4 games Juventud

The 1957 Liga Española de Baloncesto season was the first season of the Liga Española de Baloncesto. The season ended with Real Madrid winning their first championship.

== Teams ==
The league was composed by 6 teams and played with a double round-robin format. The league was played in 50 days (March 31–May 19) at only two venues: Fiesta Alegre in Madrid and Palau dels esports in Barcelona.

=== Venues and locations ===
| Team | Home city | Arena | Capacity |
|---|---|---|---|
| Aismalíbar | Montcada i Reixac | Palacio de los Deportes | 8,000 |
| Barcelona | Barcelona | Palacio de los Deportes | 8,000 |
| Estudiantes | Madrid | Fiesta Alegre | 3,500 |
| Joventut | Badalona | Palacio de los Deportes | 8,000 |
| Orillo Verde | Sabadell | Palacio de los Deportes | 8,000 |
| Real Madrid | Madrid | Fiesta Alegre | 3,500 |

== League table ==
| Pos | Team | Pld | W | D | L | PF | PA | PD | Pts | Qualification or relegation |
|---|---|---|---|---|---|---|---|---|---|---|
| 1 | Real Madrid (C) | 10 | 7 | 0 | 3 | 706 | 593 | +113 | 14 | Qualification to European Champions Cup |
| 2 | Barcelona | 10 | 7 | 0 | 3 | 547 | 514 | +33 | 14 | |
| 3 | Orillo Verde | 10 | 6 | 0 | 4 | 593 | 600 | −7 | 12 | |
| 4 | Aismalíbar | 10 | 5 | 0 | 5 | 536 | 526 | +10 | 10 | |
| 5 | Estudiantes | 10 | 3 | 0 | 7 | 585 | 662 | −77 | 6 | |
| 6 | Juventud | 10 | 2 | 0 | 8 | 520 | 592 | −72 | 4 | |

Source: Linguasport
(C) Champions

=== Results ===
| Home \ Away | AIS | BAR | EST | JOV | ORI | RMB |
|---|---|---|---|---|---|---|
| Aismalíbar | — | 45–43 | 65–46 | 43–47 | 49–56 | 65–58 |
| Barcelona | 59–52 | — | 58–53 | 52–39 | 48–55 | 60–50 |
| Estudiantes | 48–74 | 50–59 | — | 78–74 | 61–79 | 68–63 |
| Juventud | 40–53 | 38–42 | 62–69 | — | 65–50 | 49–80 |
| Orillo Verde | 56–49 | 59–71 | 52–51 | 53–45 | — | 73–75 |
| Real Madrid | 73–41 | 73–55 | 76–61 | 72–61 | 86–60 | — |

Source: Linguasport
Legend: Blue = home team win; Red = away team win.

== Individual statistics ==
=== Points ===
| Rank | Name | Team | Games | Points | PPG |
|---|---|---|---|---|---|
| 1 | (Spain) Alfonso Martínez | Real Madrid | 10 | 180 | 18 |
| 2 | (Spain) José María Soro | Orillo Verde | 10 | 176 | 17.6 |
| 3 | (Spain) Joaquín Hernández | Real Madrid | 10 | 162 | 16.2 |
| 4 | (Spain) Jordi Bonareu | Barcelona | 10 | 134 | 13.4 |
| 5 | (Spain) Leopoldo Codina | Estudiantes | 10 | 132 | 13.2 |
