= 1962–63 Liga Española de Baloncesto =

1962–63 Liga Nacional de Baloncesto
- League: Liga Nacional
- Sport: Basketball
- Teams: 14
- TV partner: Televisión Española

Regular Season
- Season champions: Real Madrid

ACB seasons
- ← 1961–62 1963–64 →

The 1962–63 season was the 7th season of the Liga Nacional de Baloncesto. Real Madrid won the title.

== Teams and venues ==
Team	Home city
Real Madrid CF	Madrid
Club Juventud	Badalona
CB Estudiantes	Madrid
Picadero JC	Barcelona
Club Tritones	Zaragoza
Club Águilas	Bilbao
CB Aismalíbar	Moncada
Club Agromán	Madrid
Canoe NC	Madrid
CD Layetano	Barcelona
CF Barcelona	Barcelona
UD Montgat	Montgat

== First stage ==
=== Group A ===
==== League table ====
Pos	Team	Pld	W	L	PF	PA	PD	Pts	Qualification or relegation
1	Real Madrid	10	9	1	808	487	+321	19	Qualification to final stage
2	Estudiantes	10	8	2	672	537	+135	18	Qualification to final stage
3	Tritones (Note: Tritones withdrew at the end of the season) (R)	10	5	5	460	534	−74	15	Withdraw
4	Agromán	10	3	7	477	588	−111	13	
5	Águilas	10	3	7	494	617	−123	13	
6	Real Canoe (Note: Real Canoe avoid relegation after a League expansion)	10	2	8	466	614	−148	12	Relegation playoffs

Source: Linguasport
(R) Relegated

=== Group B ===
==== League table ====
Pos	Team	Pld	W	L	PF	PA	PD	Pts	Qualification or relegation
1	Picadero	10	10	0	676	510	+166	20	Qualification to final stage
2	Juventud	10	6	4	657	561	+96	16	Qualification to final stage
3	Aismalíbar	10	6	4	624	548	+76	16	
4	Layetano	10	5	5	545	563	−18	15	
5	Montgat	10	3	7	567	628	−61	13	
6	Barcelona (O)	10	0	10	440	699	−259	10	Relegation playoffs

Source: Linguasport
(O) Play-off winners

== Final stage ==
=== League table ===
Pos	Team	Pld	W	L	PF	PA	PD	Pts	Qualification or relegation
1	Real Madrid (C)	6	5	1	531	410	+121	11	Qualification to FIBA European Champions Cup
2	Estudiantes	6	3	3	405	419	−14	9	
3	Juventud	6	3	3	391	473	−82	9	
4	Picadero	6	1	5	370	395	−25	7	

Source: Linguasport
(C) Champions

=== Relegation playoffs ===
Team 1	Series	Team 2	Game 1	Game 2	Game 3
Real Canoe	0–2	Barcelona	50–60	39–46	

== Stats Leaders ==
=== Points ===
Rank	Name	Team	Points
1.	Emiliano Rodríguez	RMA	319
2.	Alfonso Martínez	PIC	225
