= John Coughran =

American basketball player (born 1951)

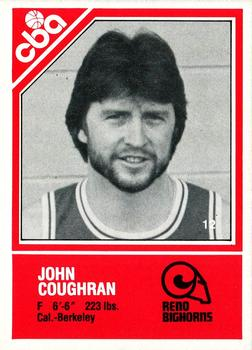

Personal information
- Born: September 12, 1951 (age 75) Pittsburg, California, U.S.
- Listed height: 6 ft 7 in (2.01 m)
- Listed weight: 225 lb (102 kg)

Career information
- High school: Piedmont Hills (San Jose, California)
- College: California (1970–1973)
- NBA draft: 1973: 5th round, 74th overall pick
- Drafted by: Cleveland Cavaliers
- Playing career: 1973–1980
- Position: Small forward / power forward
- Number: 41, 15

Career history
- 1973–1975: YMCA España
- 1975–1978: Real Madrid
- 1978–1979: Stella Azzurra
- 1979–1980: Golden State Warriors

Career highlights
- 3× FIBA Intercontinental Cup champion (1976–1978); EuroLeague champion (1978); 2× Spanish League champion (1976, 1977); Spanish Cup winner (1977); Spanish League Top Scorer (1974)
- Stats at NBA.com
- Stats at Basketball Reference

John Douglas Coughran (born September 12, 1951) is an American former professional basketball player. During his playing career, at a height of 2.01 m (6 ft 7 in) tall, he played at the small forward and power forward positions.

== Early life ==
Coughran was born in Pittsburg, California, in September 1951. He attended Piedmont Hills High School, in San Jose, California, where he also played high school basketball.

== College career ==
After high school, Coughran played college basketball for the California Golden Bears, from 1969 to 1973.

== Professional career ==
After college, Coughran was drafted from the University of California, in the fifth round of the 1973 NBA draft, with the 74th overall pick, by the Cleveland Cavaliers. He played one season in the National Basketball Association (NBA), with the Golden State Warriors, during the 1979–1980 season.

He also played in Spain's top-level league, the Primera División, where he was the league's top scorer, in the 1973–74 season. With Real Madrid, he won the FIBA European Champions Cup (EuroLeague) championship of the 1977–78 season. With Real Madrid, he also won the 1976, 1977, and 1978 editions of the FIBA Intercontinental Cup.

He also played in Italy's top-level league, the LBA, with Stella Azzurra.

== Career statistics ==
Legend
GP	Games played	GS	Games started	MPG	Minutes per game
FG%	Field goal percentage	3P%	3-point field goal percentage	FT%	Free throw percentage
RPG	Rebounds per game	APG	Assists per game	SPG	Steals per game
BPG	Blocks per game	PPG	Points per game	**Bold**	Career high

=== NBA ===
==== Regular season ====
Year	Team	GP	MPG	FG%	3P%	FT%	RPG	APG	SPG	BPG	PPG
1979–80	Golden State	24	6.7	.358	.222	.571	.8	.5	.3	.0	2.8
