= 1977–78 Liga Española de Baloncesto =

1977–78 Liga Nacional de Baloncesto
- League: Liga Nacional
- Sport: Basketball
- Number of teams: 14
- TV partner(s): Televisión Española

Regular Season
- Season champions: Joventut Badalona
- Top scorer: (United States) Essie Hollis (Askatuak SBT)

ACB seasons
- ← 1976–77 1978–79 →

The 1977–78 season was the 22nd season of the Liga Nacional de Baloncesto. Joventut Badalona won the title.

== Teams and venues ==
Team	Home city
FC Barcelona	Barcelona
Real Madrid CF	Madrid
CB Areslux Granollers	Granollers
UDR Pineda	Pineda de Mar
CB Askatuak	San Sebastián
Club Joventut	Badalona
CB Cotonificio	Badalona
CE Manresa	Manresa
CB Estudiantes	Madrid
UE Mataró	Mataró
CB L'Hospitalet	L'Hospitalet de Llobregat
CD Basconia	Vitoria

== Team Standings ==
Pos	Team	Pld	W	D	L	PF	PA	Pts
1	Club Joventut de Badalona	22	20	0	2	2135	1823	40
2	Real Madrid	22	19	0	3	2446	1781	38
3	FC Barcelona	22	19	0	3	2185	1824	38
4	CB Cotonificio	22	12	1	9	1908	1973	25
5	CE Manresa	22	9	1	12	1889	1989	19
6	CB Askatuak	22	7	3	12	1833	1991	17
7	CB Estudiantes	22	8	1	13	2005	2054	17
8	UDR Pineda	22	8	0	14	1968	2112	16
9	Areslux Granollers	22	7	1	14	1905	1993	15
10	CD Basconia	22	7	1	14	1781	2072	15
11	UE Mataró	22	6	1	15	1841	2034	13
12	CB L'Hospitalet	22	5	1	16	1760	2010	11

1978 Champion
Joventut Badalona

== Stats Leaders ==
=== Points ===
Rank	Name	Team	Points	Games	PPG
1.	Essie Hollis	ASK	860	21	41.0
2.	Jack Schrader	MAT	703	22	32.0
3.	Bob Fullarton	MAN	605	22	27.5
