= 1964–65 Liga Española de Baloncesto =

1964–65 Liga Nacional de Baloncesto
- League: Liga Nacional
- Sport: Basketball
- Teams: 8
- TV partner: Televisión Española

Regular Season
- Season champions: Real Madrid

ACB seasons
- ← 1963–64 1965–66 →

The 1964–65 season was the 9th season of the Liga Nacional de Baloncesto. Real Madrid won the title.

== Teams and venues ==
Team	Home city
Canoe NC	Madrid
Real Madrid CF	Madrid
CD Mataró	Mataró
Club Juventud	Badalona
CB Estudiantes	Madrid
Club Águilas	Bilbao
Picadero JC	Barcelona
CN Helios	Zaragoza

== League table ==
Pos	Team	Pld	W	L	PF	PA	PD	Pts	Qualification or relegation
1	Real Madrid (C)	14	13	1	1210	808	+402	27	Qualification to FIBA European Champions Cup
2	Picadero Damm	14	11	3	903	780	+123	25	
3	Juventud Fantasit	14	8	6	940	800	+140	22	
4	Estudiantes	14	6	8	859	979	−120	20	
5	Molfort's Mataró	14	5	9	934	879	+55	19	
6	Helios Tusa	14	5	9	809	953	−144	19	
7	Águilas Schuss (O)	14	4	10	889	1024	−135	18	Relegation playoffs
8	Real Canoe (R)	14	4	10	572	893	−321	18	Relegation playoffs

Source: Linguasport
(C) Champions; (O) Play-off winners; (R) Relegated

== Relegation playoffs ==
Club Águilas remained in the league and Canoe NC was relegated after the relegation playoffs, played with the third and fourth qualified teams in Segunda División (CB Hospitalet, promoted, and CN Vitoria).

== Stats Leaders ==
=== Points ===
Rank	Name	Team	Points
1.	Lorenzo Alocén	HEL	330
2.	Vicente Ramos	EST	279
3.	Alfonso Martínez	PIC	247
