= 1973–74 Liga Española de Baloncesto =

1973–74 Liga Nacional de Baloncesto
- League: Liga Nacional
- Sport: Basketball
- Number of teams: 15
- TV partner(s): Televisión Española

Regular Season
- Season champions: Real Madrid

ACB seasons
- ← 1972–73 1974–75 →

The 1973–74 season was the 18th season of the Liga Nacional de Baloncesto. Real Madrid won the title.

== Teams and venues ==
| Team | Home city |
|---|---|
| FC Barcelona | Barcelona |
| Real Madrid CF | Madrid |
| SD Kas | Bilbao |
| UDR Pineda | Pineda de Mar |
| Club Águilas | Bilbao |
| Club Juventud | Badalona |
| Círculo Católico | Badalona |
| CE Manresa | Manresa |
| CB Estudiantes | Madrid |
| Club YMCA España | Madrid |
| CD Mataró | Mataró |
| CD Vasconia | Vitoria |
| CB San José Irpen | Badalona |
| Club Vallehermoso OJE | Madrid |
| CB Breogán | Lugo |

== Regular season ==
=== League table ===
| Pos | Team | Pld | W | D | L | PF | PA | PD | Pts | Qualification or relegation |
|---|---|---|---|---|---|---|---|---|---|---|
| 1 | Real Madrid (C) | 28 | 27 | 1 | 0 | 3007 | 1961 | +1046 | 55 | Qualification to European Champions Cup |
| 2 | Barcelona | 28 | 22 | 2 | 4 | 2680 | 2254 | +426 | 46 | Qualification to Korać Cup |
| 3 | Juventud Schweppes | 28 | 22 | 1 | 5 | 2478 | 1992 | +486 | 45 | Qualification to European Cup Winners' Cup |
| 4 | Estudiantes Aguas Monteverde | 28 | 17 | 2 | 9 | 2437 | 2178 | +259 | 36 | |
| 5 | Kas | 28 | 15 | 1 | 12 | 2437 | 2448 | −11 | 31 | Withdraw |
| 6 | Manresa La Casera | 28 | 13 | 2 | 13 | 2352 | 2234 | +118 | 28 | |
| 7 | Pineda | 28 | 13 | 0 | 15 | 2183 | 2275 | −92 | 26 | Qualification to Korać Cup |
| 8 | Vasconia | 28 | 12 | 0 | 16 | 2176 | 2271 | −95 | 24 | |
| 9 | San José Irpen Rovilux | 28 | 11 | 1 | 16 | 2147 | 2345 | −198 | 23 | Withdraw |
| 10 | Círculo Católico | 28 | 11 | 1 | 16 | 2097 | 2367 | −270 | 23 | |
| 11 | YMCA España | 28 | 11 | 1 | 16 | 2169 | 2409 | −240 | 23 | Qualification to Korać Cup |
| 12 | Náutico (R) | 28 | 8 | 1 | 19 | 2055 | 2492 | −437 | 17 | Relegation playoffs |
| 13 | Ignis Mataró (O) | 28 | 8 | 0 | 20 | 2315 | 2478 | −163 | 16 | Relegation playoffs |
| 14 | Vallehermoso (R) | 28 | 7 | 1 | 20 | 2308 | 2565 | −257 | 15 | Relegation |
| 15 | Breogán (R) | 28 | 6 | 0 | 22 | 1970 | 2542 | −572 | 12 | Relegation |

Source: Linguasport^{[usurped]}
(C) Champions; (O) Play-off winners; (R) Relegated

== Relegation playoffs ==
| Team 1 | Agg. | Team 2 | 1st leg | 2nd leg |
|---|---|---|---|---|
| RC Náutico | 134–146 | Club Águilas | 66–59 | 68–87 |
| CD Mataró | 147–137 | ADC Castilla | 94–65 | 53–62 |

== Stats Leaders ==
=== Points ===
| Rank | Name | Team | Points | Games | PPG |
|---|---|---|---|---|---|
| 1. | John Coughran | YMC | 888 | 28 | 31.7 |
| 2. | Walter Szczerbiak | RMA | 818 | 27 | 30.3 |
| 3. | Gonzalo Sagi-Vela | EST | 693 | 25 | 27.7 |
