= 1958 Liga Española de Baloncesto =

Association Football League

Liga Española de Baloncesto
- Season: 1958
- Games played: 90
- Teams: 10

Finals
- Champions: Real Madrid (2nd title)
- Runners-up: Juventud

Statistical leaders
Points	Alfonso Martínez	17.2

Records
- Biggest home win: Real Madrid 96–48 Layetano (8 March 1958)
- Biggest away win: Layetano 34–97 Real Madrid (24 May 1958)
- Highest scoring: Real Madrid 96–48 Layetano (8 March 1958)
- Winning streak: 12 games Real Madrid
- Losing streak: 12 games Real Canoe

The 1958 season was the 2nd season of the Liga Española de Baloncesto. Real Madrid won their title.

== Teams ==
=== Venues and locations ===
Team	Home city	Arena	Capacity
Aismalíbar	Montcada i Reixac	Palacio de los Deportes	8,000
Barcelona	Barcelona	Palacio de los Deportes	8,000
Español	Barcelona	Palacio de los Deportes	8,000
Estudiantes	Madrid	Fiesta Alegre	3,500
Hesperia	Madrid	Fiesta Alegre	3,500
Juventud	Badalona	La Plana	—
Layetano	Barcelona	Palacio de los Deportes	8,000
Orillo Verde	Sabadell	Palacio de los Deportes	8,000
Real Canoe	Madrid	Fiesta Alegre	3,500
Real Madrid	Madrid	Fiesta Alegre	3,500

== League table ==
Pos	Team	Pld	W	D	L	PF	PA	PD	Pts	Qualification or relegation
1	Real Madrid (C)	18	16	0	2	1241	880	+361	32	Qualification to European Champions Cup
2	Juventud	18	14	1	3	1059	821	+238	29	
3	Aismalíbar	18	13	0	5	1031	866	+165	26	
4	Orillo Verde	18	13	0	5	1054	893	+161	26	
5	Estudiantes	18	11	1	6	879	861	+18	23	
6	Hesperia	18	7	0	11	1028	1032	−4	14	
7	Español	18	7	0	11	943	1092	−149	14	
8	Barcelona	18	4	0	14	791	938	−147	8	
9	Layetano (R)	18	2	0	16	759	1125	−366	4	Relegation playoffs
10	Real Canoe (O)	18	2	0	16	814	1091	−277	4	Relegation playoffs

Source: Linguasport^{[usurped]}
(C) Champions; (O) Play-off winners; (R) Relegated

== Relegation playoffs ==
Team 1	Series	Team 2	Game 1	Game 2	Game 3
La Salle Josepets	2–1	Layetano	60–48	38–62	45–32
Real Canoe	2–0	Parque Móvil	59–39	44–24	

== Individual statistics ==
=== Points ===
Rank	Name	Team	Games	Points	PPG
1	(Spain) Alfonso Martínez	Real Madrid	18	310	17.2
2	(Spain) Jordi Bonareu	Orillo Verde	18	303	16.8
3	(Spain) Carlos Sevillano	Hesperia	18	290	16.1
4	(Spain) Constantino Nadal	Hesperia	18	276	15.3
5	(Puerto Rico) Johnny Báez	Real Madrid	18	269	14.9
