= 1968–69 Liga Española de Baloncesto =

Liga Española de Baloncesto
- Season: 1968–69
- Games played: 132
- Teams: 12
- TV partner: TVE

Finals
- Champions: Real Madrid (11th title)
- Runners-up: Juventud Nerva

Statistical leaders
- Points: Charles Thomas

Records
- Biggest home win: Real Madrid 133–63 Manresa (16 March 1969)
- Biggest away win: San Sebastián 42–75 Juventud (23 November 1968); Náutico 67–100 Real Madrid (12 January 1969)
- Highest scoring: San José 114–91 Picadero (23 February 1969)
- Winning streak: 15 games Real Madrid
- Losing streak: 6 games Bosco Revoltosa

The 1968–69 Liga Española de Baloncesto season was the 13th season of the Liga Española de Baloncesto and was played between 23 November 1968 and 20 April 1969. The season ended with Real Madrid winning their 11th title.

== Overview before the season ==
12 teams joined the league, including three promoted from the 1967–68 Segunda División.

Promoted from 1967 to 1968 Segunda División

- San José Irpen
- Manresa Kan's
- Bosco Revoltosa

== Teams and locations ==
Location of teams in 1968–69 Liga Española de Baloncesto
Location of teams in 1968–69 Liga Española de Baloncesto (Canary Islands)

Team	Home city
Atlético San Sebastián	San Sebastián
Barcelona	Barcelona
Bosco Revoltosa	A Coruña
Estudiantes	Madrid
Juventud Nerva	Badalona
Kas	Bilbao
Manresa Kan's	Manresa
Mataró Molfort's	Mataró
Náutico	Santa Cruz de Tenerife
Picadero Damm	Barcelona
Real Madrid	Madrid
San José Irpen	Badalona

== Regular season ==
=== League table ===
Pos	Team	Pld	W	D	L	PF	PA	PD	Pts	Qualification or relegation
1	Real Madrid (C)	22	18	1	3	2032	1474	+558	37	Qualification to FIBA European Champions Cup
2	Juventud Nerva	22	15	3	4	1649	1378	+271	33	Qualification to FIBA European Cup Winners' Cup
3	Picadero Damm	22	16	0	6	1743	1514	+229	32	
4	Kas	22	14	0	8	1496	1386	+110	28	
5	Estudiantes	22	12	0	10	1703	1623	+80	24	
6	Atlético San Sebastián	22	9	0	13	1218	1432	−214	18	
7	Barcelona	22	8	1	13	1469	1527	−58	17	
8	Mataró Molfort's	22	8	1	13	1582	1612	−30	17	
9	San José Irpen (O)	22	8	1	13	1661	1783	−122	17	Relegation playoffs
10	Náutico (O)	22	7	0	15	1265	1629	−364	14	Relegation playoffs
11	Manresa Kan's (R)	22	7	0	15	1414	1635	−221	14	Relegation
12	Bosco Revoltosa (R)	22	6	1	15	1389	1628	−239	13	Relegation

Source: Linguasport
(C) Champions; (O) Play-off winners; (R) Relegated

== Relegation playoffs ==
Team 1	Agg.	Team 2	1st leg	2nd leg
San José Irpen	132–125	Pineda	69–57	63–68
Náutico	141–119	Fiber Urcelay	77–45	64–74

== Statistics leaders ==
=== Points ===
Rank	Name	Team	Points
1	(United States) Charles Thomas	San José Irpen	563
2	(United States) Earl Beechum	Picadero Damm	482
3	(Spain) José Sagi-Vela	Estudiantes	479
4	(Spain) Lorenzo Alocén	Picadero Damm	451
5	(United States) Steve Sullivan	Kas	437
