= 1980–81 Liga Española de Baloncesto =

1980–81 Liga Nacional de Baloncesto
- League: Liga Nacional
- Sport: Basketball
- Number of teams: 14
- TV partner(s): Televisión Española

Regular Season
- Season champions: FC Barcelona
- Top scorer: (Canada) Lars Hansen (OAR)

ACB seasons
- ← 1979–80 1981–82 →

The 1980–81 season was the 25th season of the Liga Nacional de Baloncesto. FC Barcelona won the title.

== Teams and venues ==
Team	Home city
FC Barcelona	Barcelona
Real Madrid CF	Madrid
CB Areslux Granollers	Granollers
CN Helios	Zaragoza
CB L'Hospitalet	L'Hospitalet
CB Miñón Valladolid	Valladolid
Club Joventut	Badalona
CB Cotonificio	Badalona
Manresa EB	Manresa
CB Estudiantes	Madrid
CB OAR Ferrol	Ferrol
CB Inmobanco	Madrid
RC Náutico	Santa Cruz de Tenerife
CD Basconia	Vitoria

== Team Standings ==
Pos	Team	Pld	W	D	L	PF	PA	Pts	
1	FC Barcelona	26	23	0	3	2651	2162	46	
2	CB Estudiantes	26	18	2	6	2347	2210	38	
3	Real Madrid	26	18	2	6	2469	2125	38	
4	CB Cotonificio	26	18	1	7	2265	2079	37	
5	Club Joventut de Badalona	26	16	1	9	2368	2240	33	
6	Miñón Valladolid	26	13	0	13	2314	2391	26	
7	CN Helios	26	11	0	15	2230	2256	22	
8	Manresa EB	26	10	1	15	2262	2357	21	
9	CB OAR Ferrol	26	10	1	15	2160	2313	21	
10	Areslux Granollers	26	9	1	16	2163	2265	19	
11	RC Náutico	26	9	1	16	2079	2237	19	
12	CB L'Hospitalet	26	9	0	17	2100	2230	18	Relegation to Primera División B
13	CB Inmobanco	26	7	0	19	2339	2504	14	Relegation to Primera División B
14	CD Basconia	26	6	0	20	2024	2302	12	Relegation to Primera División B

1981 Champion
FC Barcelona

== Stats Leaders ==
=== Points ===
Rank	Name	Team	Points	Games	PPG
1.	Lars Hansen	OAR	713	26	27.4
2.	Essie Hollis	GRA	692	26	26.6
3.	Nate Davis	VAD	605	26	26.3
