= 1974–75 Liga Española de Baloncesto =

1974–75 Liga Nacional de Baloncesto
- League: Liga Nacional
- Sport: Basketball
- Number of teams: 14
- TV partner(s): Televisión Española

Regular Season
- Season champions: Real Madrid

ACB seasons
- ← 1973–74 1975–76 →

The 1974–75 season was the 19th season of the Liga Nacional de Baloncesto. Real Madrid won the title.

== Teams and venues ==
Team	Home city
FC Barcelona	Barcelona
Real Madrid CF	Madrid
CB L'Hospitalet	L'Hospitalet de Llobregat
UDR Pineda	Pineda de Mar
Club Águilas	Bilbao
Club Juventud	Badalona
Círculo Católico	Badalona
CE Manresa	Manresa
CB Estudiantes	Madrid
Club YMCA España	Madrid
CD Mataró	Mataró
CD Vasconia	Vitoria

== First stage ==
Pos	Team	Pld	W	D	L	PF	PA	PD	Pts	Qualification or relegation
1	Real Madrid (C)	22	20	0	2	2288	1705	+583	40	Qualification to European Champions Cup
2	Barcelona	22	19	0	3	2019	1614	+405	38	Qualification to Korać Cup
3	Juventud Schweppes	22	16	1	5	1850	1613	+237	33	Qualification to Korać Cup
4	YMCA España	22	11	0	11	1891	1870	+21	22	
5	Manresa La Casera	22	9	3	10	1697	1650	+47	21	
6	Círculo Católico	22	10	0	12	1768	1885	−117	20	
7	Estudiantes Aguas Monteverde	22	8	0	14	1781	1911	−130	16	Qualification to Korać Cup
8	Vasconia	22	8	0	14	1711	1874	−163	16	
9	CB L'Hospitalet	22	7	1	14	1700	1858	−158	15	
10	Club Águilas (O)	22	7	1	14	1697	1931	−234	15	Relegation playoffs
11	Pineda (O)	22	7	0	15	1667	1951	−284	14	Relegation playoffs
12	Ignis Mataró (R)	22	7	0	15	1741	1948	−207	14	Relegation

Source: Linguasport^{[usurped]}
(C) Champions; (O) Play-off winners; (R) Relegated

== Relegation playoffs ==
Team 1	Agg.	Team 2	1st leg	2nd leg
RC Náutico	164–166	Club Águilas	88–69	76–97
CB Granollers	131–141	UDR Pineda	65–64	66–77

== Stats Leaders ==
=== Points ===
Rank	Name	Team	Points	Games	PPG
1.	Ray Price	VAS	708	22	32.2
1.	Bob Gords	HOS	565	18	31.4
3.	Walter Szczerbiak	RMA	659	22	30.0
