= Círcol Catòlic de Badalona =

Círcol Cotonifici Badalona
- Nickname: El Círcol
- Leagues: Copa Catalunya
- Founded: 1941
- Location: Badalona, Catalonia; Santa Coloma de Gramenet (1983–1989)
- Team colors: Blue and white
- President: Antoni Forteza
- Website: elcircol.cat
Home	Away

Círcol Catòlic de Badalona (in Spanish, Círculo Católico de Badalona) is a basketball club based in Badalona, Spain.

== History ==
The club was founded in 1941 and competed in the third division until 1958, when it promotes to Segunda División. Círcol played ten seasons in this league before being relegated again to Tercera in 1970. In two years, the team achieved the promotion to the Liga Nacional.

The team remained in the Liga Nacional (in 1983 renamed Liga ACB) until 1986. Círcol always played in Badalona until 1984 when the club was relocated to Santa Coloma de Gramenet until it was relegated to 1ª División B.

Nowadays, the club continues competing in the Regional Divisions of Catalonia.

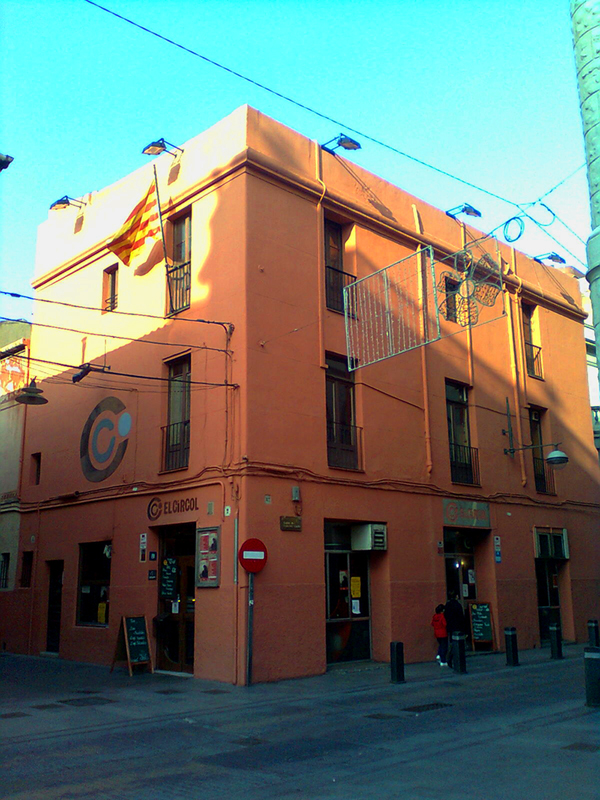
Círcol Catòlic headquarters.

== Sponsorship naming ==
- CB Cotonificio 1976–1983
- Licor 43 1983–1986

== Season by season ==
Season	Tier	Division	Pos.	W–L	Copa del Rey	European competitions		
1968–69	2	2ª División	5th	11–7				
1969–70	2	2ª División	12th	4–18				
1970–71	3	3ª División	6th	17–1–8				
1971–72	3	3ª División	1st	29–2				
1972–73	2	2ª División	1st	24–1–4				
1973–74	1	1ª División	10th	11–1–16				
1974–75	1	1ª División	6th	10–12	Quarterfinalist			
1975–76	1	1ª División	5th	13–2–17				
1976–77	1	1ª División	8th	9–13	Group stage			
1977–78	1	1ª División	4th	12–1–9	Quarterfinalist			
1978–79	1	1ª División	5th	13–1–8	Round of 16	3 Korać Cup	SF	7–3
1979–80	1	1ª División	4th	13–1–8	Quarterfinalist	3 Korać Cup	GS	6–2
1980–81	1	1ª División	4th	18–1–7	Quarterfinalist	3 Korać Cup	R2	1–1
1981–82	1	1ª División	3rd	20–6	Semifinalist	3 Korać Cup	GS	5–3
1982–83	1	1ª División	8th	13–13	Semifinalist			
1983–84	1	Liga ACB	8th	21–13				
1984–85	1	Liga ACB	4th	18–14		3 Korać Cup	GS	6–4
1985–86	1	Liga ACB	8th	10–21				
1986–87	2	1ª División B	10th	17–17				
1987–88	2	1ª División B	9th	20–20				
1988–89	2	1ª División B	14th	10–23				
1989–90	3	2ª División						
1990–91	2	1ª División	14th	15–24				
1991–92	2	1ª División	13th	12–27				
1992–00	Lower divisions							
2000–01	5	Copa Catalunya	9th	15–15				
2001–02	5	Copa Catalunya	14th	12–20				
2002–03	5	Copa Catalunya	15th	9–23				
2003–04	6	1ª Catalana	3rd	24–8				
2004–05	5	Copa Catalunya	4th	19–11				
2005–06	6	1ª Catalana	15th	9–21				
2006–07	7	2ª Catalana	9th	15–15				
2007–08	8	2ª Catalana	9th	16–14				
2008–09	8	2ª Catalana	5th	18–12				
2009–10	7	2ª Catalana	1st	22–8				
2010–11	6	1ª Catalana	6th	15–15				
2011–12	6	1ª Catalana	13th	13–17				
2012–13	7	2ª Catalana	2nd	24–6				
2013–14	6	1ª Catalana	3rd	13–25				
2014–15	5	Copa Catalunya	9th	16–14				
2015-16	5	Copa Catalunya	11th	12–18				
2016–17	6	1ª Catalana	3rd	26–6				
2017-18	5	Copa Catalunya	7th	12-14				

== Notable players ==
- (Spain) Quim Costa
- (Spain) Andrés Jiménez

== Notable coaches ==
- (Spain) Aíto García Reneses
