= 1972–73 Liga Española de Baloncesto =

Liga Española de Baloncesto
- Season: 1972–73
- Games played: 240
- Teams: 16
- TV partner(s): TVE

Finals
- Champions: Real Madrid (15th title)
- Runners-up: Juventud Schweppes

Statistical leaders
- Points: Alfredo Pérez

Records
- Biggest home win: Real Madrid 121–42 Ignis Mataró (4 February 1973)
- Biggest away win: Vallehermoso 63–107 Madrid (18 November 1972)
- Highest scoring: Kas 98–96 Barcelona (20 January 1973)
- Winning streak: 30 games Real Madrid
- Losing streak: 8 games Águilas Schweppes

The 1972–73 Liga Española de Baloncesto season was the 17th season of the Liga Española de Baloncesto and was played between 28 October 1972 and 27 May 1973. The season ended with Real Madrid winning their 15th title.

== Overview before the season ==
16 teams joined the league, including four promoted from the 1971–72 Segunda División.

Promoted from 1971 to 1972 Segunda División

- Vasconia
- Águilas Schweppes
- Ignis Mataró
- Manresa

== Teams and locations ==
Location of teams in 1972–73 Liga Española de Baloncesto
Location of teams in 1972–73 Liga Española de Baloncesto (Canary Islands)

Team	Home city
Águilas Schweppes	Bilbao
Barcelona	Barcelona
Breogán Fontecelta	Lugo
Estudiantes Aguas Monteverde	Madrid
Filomatic Picadero	Barcelona
Ignis Mataró	Mataró
Juventud Schweppes	Badalona
Kas	Bilbao
Manresa	Manresa
Manresa La Casera	Manresa
Náutico	Santa Cruz de Tenerife
Pineda	Pineda de Mar
Real Madrid	Madrid
San José Irpen Rovilux	Badalona
Vallehermoso	Madrid
Vasconia	Vitoria-Gasteiz

== Regular season ==
=== League table ===
Pos	Team	Pld	W	D	L	PF	PA	PD	Pts	Qualification or relegation
1	Real Madrid (C)	30	30	0	0	2727	1824	+903	60	Qualification to European Champions Cup
2	Juventud Schweppes	30	25	2	3	2471	1976	+495	52	Qualification to Korać Cup
3	Barcelona	30	22	2	6	2607	2023	+584	46	Qualification to Korać Cup
4	Estudiantes Aguas Monteverde	30	17	1	12	2339	2170	+169	35	Qualification to European Cup Winners' Cup
5	Filomatic Picadero (Note: Filomatic Picadero withdrew at the end of the season)	30	15	0	15	2194	2081	+113	30	Withdraw
6	Kas	30	15	0	15	2452	2425	+27	30	Qualification to Korać Cup
7	Manresa La Casera	30	14	1	15	2249	2182	+67	29	
8	Pineda	30	13	2	15	2068	2226	−158	28	
9	Ignis Mataró	30	12	1	17	2101	2384	−283	25	
10	Vasconia	30	12	0	18	2047	2119	−72	24	
11	Vallehermoso	30	11	1	18	2226	2398	−172	23	
12	San José Irpen Rovilux (O)	30	11	0	19	2007	2209	−202	22	Relegation playoffs
13	Breogán Fontecelta (O)	30	11	0	19	2091	2470	−379	22	Relegation playoffs
14	Náutico (O)	30	10	1	19	2002	2210	−208	21	Relegation playoffs
15	Manresa (R)	30	9	1	20	1899	2363	−464	19	Relegation
16	Águilas Schweppes (R)	30	7	0	23	1853	2273	−420	14	Relegation

Source: Linguasport^{[usurped]}
(C) Champions; (O) Play-off winners; (R) Relegated

== Relegation playoffs ==
Team 1	Agg.	Team 2	1st leg	2nd leg
La Salle Josepets	126–166	San José Irpen Rovilux	56–72	70–90
Universidad Canarias	137–167	Breogán Fontecelta	71–71	66–96
Náutico	w/o	Real Canoe		

== Statistics leaders ==
=== Points ===
Rank	Name	Team	Games	Points	PPG
1	(Spain) Alfredo Pérez	Breogán Fontecelta	30	697	23.2
2	(Spain) Víctor Escorial	Filomatic Picadero	30	682	22.7
3	(United States) Charles Thomas	Barcelona	30	628	20.9
4	(Spain) Alfonso Martínez	Ignis Mataró	24	498	20.7
5	(Spain) José Sagi-Vela	Kas	30	619	20.6
