= 1967–68 Liga Española de Baloncesto =

1967–68 Liga Nacional de Baloncesto
- League: Liga Nacional
- Sport: Basketball
- Number of teams: 11
- TV partner(s): Televisión Española

Regular Season
- Season champions: Real Madrid

ACB seasons
- ← 1966–67 1968–69 →

The 1967–68 season was the 12th season of the Liga Nacional de Baloncesto. Real Madrid won the title.

== Teams and venues ==
Team	Home city
FC Barcelona	Barcelona
Real Madrid CF	Madrid
SD Kas	Vitoria
CD Mataró	Mataró
Club Juventud	Badalona
Atlético San Sebastián	San Sebastián
CB Estudiantes	Madrid
Club Águilas	Bilbao
Picadero JC	Barcelona
RC Náutico	Santa Cruz de Tenerife
Club Vallehermoso OJE	Madrid

== League table ==
Pos	Team	Pld	W	L	PF	PA	PD	Pts	Qualification or relegation
1	Real Madrid (C)	20	18	2	1597	1253	+344	38	Qualification to FIBA European Champions Cup
2	Estudiantes	20	16	4	1552	1333	+219	36	
3	Juventud Kalso	20	16	4	1572	1194	+378	36	
4	Kas	20	11	9	1571	1348	+223	31	
5	Atlético San Sebastián	20	11	9	1318	1358	−40	31	
6	Picadero Damm	20	9	11	1469	1398	+71	29	Qualification to FIBA European Cup Winners' Cup
7	Molfort's Mataró	20	9	11	1421	1381	+40	29	
8	Barcelona	20	6	14	1385	1575	−190	26	
9	Vallehermoso (R)	20	6	14	1362	1672	−310	26	Relegation playoffs
10	Náutico (O)	20	5	15	1087	1402	−315	25	Relegation playoffs
11	Águilas (R)	20	3	17	1216	1636	−420	23	Relegation

Source: Linguasport^{[usurped]}
(C) Champions; (O) Play-off winners; (R) Relegated

== Relegation playoffs ==
Team 1	Agg.	Team 2	1st leg	2nd leg
Vallehermoso	89–99	Bosco	49–42	40–57
Real Canoe	120–122	Náutico	72–52	50–72

== Stats Leaders ==
=== Points ===
Rank	Name	Team	Points
1.	Clifford Luyk	RMA	486
2.	Moncho Monsalve	KAS	480
3.	Lorenzo Alocén	PIC	424
