= 1966–67 Liga Española de Baloncesto =

1966–67 Liga Nacional de Baloncesto
- League: Liga Nacional
- Sport: Basketball
- Number of teams: 11
- TV partner(s): Televisión Española

Regular Season
- Season champions: Juventud de Badalona

ACB seasons
- ← 1965–66 1967–68 →

The 1966–67 season was the 11th season of the Liga Nacional de Baloncesto. Juventud de Badalona won its first league title ever.

== Teams and venues ==
Team	Home city
FC Barcelona	Barcelona
Real Madrid CF	Madrid
SD Kas	Vitoria
CD Mataró	Mataró
Club Juventud	Badalona
CB Hospitalet	L'Hospitalet de Llobregat
CB Estudiantes	Madrid
Club Águilas	Bilbao
Picadero JC	Barcelona
RC Náutico	Santa Cruz de Tenerife
CN Helios	Zaragoza

== League table ==
Pos	Team	Pld	W	L	PF	PA	PD	Pts	Qualification or relegation
1	Juventud Kalso (C)	20	18	2	1653	1128	+525	38	Qualification to FIBA European Champions Cup
2	Real Madrid	20	18	2	1618	1156	+462	38	Qualification to FIBA European Champions Cup
3	Estudiantes	20	14	6	1501	1212	+289	34	
4	Picadero Damm	20	13	7	1449	1271	+178	33	
5	Kas	20	10	10	1406	1333	+73	30	Qualification to FIBA European Cup Winners' Cup
6	Molfort's Mataró	20	9	11	1278	1294	−16	29	
7	Barcelona	20	9	11	1270	1325	−55	29	
8	Náutico	20	8	12	1143	1292	−149	28	
9	Águilas	20	7	13	1185	1376	−191	27	
10	L'Hospitalet (R)	20	3	17	1053	1516	−463	23	Relegation playoffs
11	Helios Trinaranjus (Note: Helios Trinaranjus withdrew at the end of the season) (O)	20	1	19	916	1569	−653	21	Relegation playoffs

Source: Linguasport^{[usurped]}
(C) Champions; (O) Play-off winners; (R) Relegated

== Relegation playoffs ==
Team 1	Agg.	Team 2	1st leg	2nd leg
L'Hospitalet	113–152	Vallehermoso	57–77	56–75
Helios Trinaranjus	105–99	Real Canoe	50–49	55–50

== Stats Leaders ==
=== Points ===
Rank	Name	Team	Points
1.	Alfonso Martínez	JUV	441
2.	Nino Buscató	JUV	357
3.	Juan Antonio Martínez Arroyo	EST	353
