= 1965–66 Liga Española de Baloncesto =

1965–66 Liga Nacional de Baloncesto
- League: Liga Nacional
- Sport: Basketball
- Number of teams: 10
- TV partner(s): Televisión Española

Regular Season
- Season champions: Real Madrid

ACB seasons
- ← 1964–65 1966–67 →

The 1965–66 season was the 10th season of the Liga Nacional de Baloncesto. Real Madrid won the title.

== Teams and venues ==
| Team | Home city |
|---|---|
| FC Barcelona | Barcelona |
| Real Madrid CF | Madrid |
| Sevilla CF | Seville |
| CD Mataró | Mataró |
| Club Juventud | Badalona |
| CB Hospitalet | L'Hospitalet de Llobregat |
| CB Estudiantes | Madrid |
| Club Águilas | Bilbao |
| Picadero JC | Barcelona |
| CN Helios | Zaragoza |

== League table ==
| Pos | Team | Pld | W | L | PF | PA | PD | Pts | Qualification or relegation |
|---|---|---|---|---|---|---|---|---|---|
| 1 | Real Madrid (C) | 18 | 16 | 2 | 1582 | 1172 | +410 | 34 | Qualification to FIBA European Champions Cup |
| 2 | Picadero Damm | 18 | 15 | 3 | 1353 | 994 | +359 | 33 | |
| 3 | Molfort's Mataró | 18 | 11 | 7 | 1295 | 1200 | +95 | 29 | |
| 4 | Juventud Kalso | 18 | 10 | 8 | 1272 | 1163 | +109 | 28 | Qualification to FIBA European Cup Winners' Cup |
| 5 | Barcelona | 18 | 8 | 10 | 1207 | 1243 | −36 | 26 | |
| 6 | Estudiantes | 18 | 8 | 10 | 1210 | 1164 | +46 | 26 | |
| 7 | Águilas | 18 | 7 | 11 | 1202 | 1347 | −145 | 25 | |
| 8 | L'Hospitalet | 18 | 5 | 13 | 1018 | 1266 | −248 | 23 | |
| 9 | Sevilla (Note: Sevilla withdrew at the end of the season) (O) | 18 | 5 | 13 | 1089 | 1359 | −270 | 23 | Relegation playoffs |
| 10 | Helios (O) | 18 | 5 | 13 | 981 | 1301 | −320 | 23 | Relegation playoffs |

Source: Linguasport^{[usurped]}
(C) Champions; (O) Play-off winners

== Relegation playoffs ==
| Team 1 | Agg. | Team 2 | 1st leg | 2nd leg |
|---|---|---|---|---|
| Dimar | 126–154 | Sevilla | 65–59 | 61–95 |
| Ripollet | 111–111 | Helios | 56–42 | 55–69 |

=== Tiebreaker ===
| Team 1 | Score | Team 2 |
|---|---|---|
| Ripollet | 47–56 | Helios |

== Stats Leaders ==
=== Points ===
| Rank | Name | Team | Points |
|---|---|---|---|
| 1. | Miles Aiken | AGU | 431 |
| 2. | Nino Buscató | JUV | 369 |
| 3. | José María Soler | MAT | 364 |
