= RCD Espanyol Bàsquet =

RCD Espanyol
- Founded: 1923
- Dissolved: 1989
- Arena: Palau dels Esports de Barcelona; Capacity: 3,500
- Location: Barcelona, Spain
- Team colors: Blue, White
- Championships: 1 Copa del Rey
Home	Away

RCD Espanyol was the basketball team of RCD Espanyol.

== History ==
The team played during several season in the old Liga Nacional de Baloncesto and in the Liga ACB until 1991, when it merged with Granollers EB.

Espanyol was the champion of the currently called Copa del Rey in 1941.

In 2018, the section was refounded by the Association of Supporters and Shareholders of RCD Espanyol, as part of SD Espanyol, the project for recovering the sporting sections of the club.

== Season by season ==
Season	Tier	Division	Pos.	W–L	Copa del Rey	Other cups	
1929–58	Copa del Rey		1-time champion (40–41)				
1957–58	1	1ª División	7th	7–11			
1958–59	1	1ª División	7th	10–14			
1959–60	1	1ª División	9th	12–1–15	First round		
1960–61	1	1ª División	10th	6–16	Semifinalist		
1961–62	1	1ª División	5th	10–8	Quarterfinalist		
1962–82	Lower divisions						
1967–68	2	2ª División	2nd	13–8			
1968–69	2	2ª División	1st	24–1–3			
1969–70	1	1ª División	12th	3–1–18			
1970–71	2	2ª División	3rd	15–1–10			
1971–72	2	2ª División	6th	9–13			
1972–73	2	2ª División	9th	13–15			
1973–74	2	2ª División					
1974–75	2	2ª División	10th	7–1–14			
1975–76	3	3ª División	1st	24–4			
1976–77	3	3ª División	5th	16–1–9			
1977–78	3	3ª División	1st	23–7			
1978–79	3	2ª División	8th	15–15			
1979–80	3	2ª División					
1980–81	3	2ª División	2nd	18–8			
1981–82	3	2ª División					
1982–83	2	1ª División B	6th	13–1–11			
1983–84	2	1ª División B	1st	21–5			
1984–85	1	Liga ACB	12th	12–18		Copa Príncipe	R2
1985–86	1	Liga ACB	12th	16–17		Copa Príncipe	QF
1986–87	1	Liga ACB	14th	15–17		Copa Príncipe	R16
1987–88	1	Liga ACB	16th	8–24		Copa Príncipe	R16
1988–89	1	Liga ACB	8th	22–16	First round		

== Trophies ==
- Spanish Cups: (1)
  - 1941
- 2nd division championships: (2)
  - 2ª División: (1) 1968–69
  - 1ª División B: (1) 1981–82
- Catalan Championship: (2)
  - 1931, 1932
