= 1981–82 Liga Española de Baloncesto =

1981–82 Liga Nacional de Baloncesto
- League: Liga Nacional
- Sport: Basketball
- Number of teams: 14
- TV partner(s): Televisión Española

Regular season
- Season champions: Real Madrid
- Top scorer: (United States) Larry McNeill (CAN)

ACB seasons
- ← 1980–81 1982–83 →

The 1981–82 season was the 26th season of the Liga Nacional de Baloncesto. Real Madrid won the title.

== Teams and venues ==
Team	Home city
FC Barcelona	Barcelona
Real Madrid CF	Madrid
CB Areslux Granollers	Granollers
CB CAI Zaragoza	Zaragoza
CB Canarias	San Cristóbal de La Laguna
CB Miñón Valladolid	Valladolid
Club Joventut	Badalona
CB Cotonificio	Badalona
Manresa EB	Manresa
CB Estudiantes	Madrid
CB OAR Ferrol	Ferrol
CB Caja de Ronda	Málaga
RC Náutico	Santa Cruz de Tenerife
CE La Salle	Barcelona

== Team standings ==
Pos	Team	Pld	W	D	L	PF	PA	Pts	
1	Real Madrid	26	25	0	1	2897	2253	50	
2	FC Barcelona	26	24	0	2	2818	2204	48	
3	CB Cotonificio	26	20	0	6	2565	2203	40	
4	Miñón Valladolid	26	16	1	9	2509	2420	33	
5	CAI Zaragoza	26	15	0	11	2539	2433	30	
6	Club Joventut de Badalona	26	15	0	11	2437	2362	30	
7	Manresa EB	26	13	0	13	2262	2371	26	
8	CB OAR Ferrol	26	12	0	14	2284	2258	24	
9	Areslux Granollers	26	11	1	14	2340	2293	23	
10	Caja de Ronda	26	10	1	15	2104	2185	21	
11	CB Estudiantes	26	10	1	15	2207	2446	21	
12	CB Canarias	26	4	2	20	2422	2696	10	Relegation to Primera División B
13	CE La Salle Barcelona	26	3	0	23	2028	2736	6	Relegation to Primera División B
14	RC Náutico	26	1	0	25	2081	2633	2	Relegation to Primera División B

1982 Champion
Real Madrid

== Stats leaders ==
=== Points ===
Rank	Name	Team	Points	Games	PPG
1.	Larry McNeill	CAN	894	26	34.4
2.	Brian Jackson	COT	767	26	29.5
3.	Nate Davis	VAD	763	26	29.3
4.	Claude Gregory	CAI	730	25	29.2
5.	Wayne McKoy	EST	719	26	27.7
6.	Essie Hollis	GRA	702	26	27.0
7.	Ron Scales	NAU	484	18	26.9
8.	Chicho Sibilio	FCB	687	26	26.4
9.	Mirza Delibašić	RMA	659	26	25.3
10.	Greg Bunch	MAN	630	26	24.2
