= 1978–79 Liga Española de Baloncesto =

1978–79 Liga Nacional de Baloncesto
- League: Liga Nacional
- Sport: Basketball
- Number of teams: 14
- TV partner(s): Televisión Española

Regular Season
- Season champions: Real Madrid
- Top scorer: (United States) Nate Davis (Ask)

ACB seasons
- ← 1977–78 1979–80 →

The 1978–79 season was the 23rd season of the Liga Nacional de Baloncesto. Real Madrid won the title.

== Teams and venues ==
Team	Home city
FC Barcelona	Barcelona
Real Madrid CF	Madrid
CB Areslux Granollers	Granollers
UDR Pineda	Pineda de Mar
CB Askatuak	San Sebastián
Club Joventut	Badalona
CB Cotonificio	Badalona
Manresa EB	Manresa
CB Estudiantes	Madrid
CB Tempus	Madrid
CB Mollet	Mollet del Vallès
CD Basconia	Vitoria

== Team Standings ==
Pos	Team	Pld	W	D	L	PF	PA	Pts
1	Real Madrid	22	19	2	1	2358	1896	40
2	FC Barcelona	22	17	0	5	2280	1881	34
3	Club Joventut de Badalona	22	16	2	7	2237	1974	34
4	CB Estudiantes	22	13	1	8	2114	1944	27
5	CB Cotonificio	22	13	1	8	2057	2022	27
6	Areslux Granollers	22	11	0	11	2100	2204	22
7	Manresa EB	22	10	0	12	2018	2011	20
8	CD Basconia	22	9	0	13	1951	2130	18
9	CB Tempus	22	9	0	13	2204	2201	18
10	CB Mollet	22	5	0	17	1871	2271	10
11	UDR Pineda	22	4	0	18	1844	2139	8
12	CB Askatuak	22	3	0	19	1815	2176	6

1979 Champion
Real Madrid

== Stats Leaders ==
=== Points ===
Rank	Name	Team	Points	Games	PPG
1.	Nate Davis	ASK	724	21	34.5
2.	Webb Williams	BAS	730	22	33.2
3.	Bobb Fullarton	MAN	631	22	28.7
