= UER Pineda de Mar =

Spanish basketball club

- Leagues: 1ª Catalana
- Founded: 1954
- Arena: Pavelló Nino Buscató
- Capacity: 2,000
- Location: Pineda de Mar, Barcelona, Catalonia, Spain
- Team colors: Red and white
- Website: uerpineda.com
Home	Away

Unió Esportiva Recreativa Pineda de Mar (in Spanish, Unión Deportiva Recreativa Pineda de Mar) is a basketball club based in Pineda de Mar, Catalonia, Spain.

== History ==
The club was created in 1952 as a merge of three entities in the municipality (Club Ciclista, Club de Bàsquet and Club d'Escacs), but it was not officially founded until 1954.

UER Pineda de Mar played in Primera División from 1971 to 1979, when it was relegated to the Primera B. In these golden years, the club achieved the fourth position in the 1976–77 and played two times the Korać Cup.

In 1995, the club came back to the second division, this time called Liga EBA and in 1996 joins the new second division LEB, where it played only two seasons before resigning. Nowadays, it plays in the Regional leagues of Catalonia.

== Season by season ==
Season	Tier	Division	Pos.	W–L	Copa del Rey	Other cups		European Competitions		
1968–69	2	2ª División	2nd	18–5						
1969–70	2	2ª División	2nd	18–6						
1970–71	2	2ª División	1st	21–3	Quarterfinalist					
1971–72	1	1ª División	10th	7–1–16						
1972–73	1	1ª División	8th	14–1–15	Quarterfinalist					
1973–74	1	1ª División	7th	13–15	Quarterfinalist					
1974–75	1	1ª División	11th	8–16				3 Korać Cup	R1	1–1
1975–76	1	1ª División	8th	14–18						
1976–77	1	1ª División	4th	11–11	Group stage					
1977–78	1	1ª División	8th	8–14	Quarterfinalist					
1978–79	1	1ª División	11th	4–18	Quarterfinalist			3 Korać Cup	R2	0–2
1979–80	2	1ª División B	12th	12–18	Quarterfinalist					
1980–81	2	1ª División B	7th	12–2–12						
1981–82	2	1ª División B	8th	11–1–14						
1982–83	2	1ª División B	7th	13–1–11						
1983–84	2	1ª División B	8th (Note: Resigned to its place in Primera División B.)	13–13						
1984–94	Lower divisions									
1994–95	3	2ª División	5th	19–11						
1995–96	2	Liga EBA	6th (Note: Joined the newly created LEB league.)	18–15						
1996–97	2	LEB	6th	19–13						
1997–98	2	LEB	12th (Note: Resigned to the place in LEB league.)	11–17		Copa Príncipe	QF			
1998–08	Lower divisions									
2008–09	6	Copa Catalunya	3rd	20–10						
2009–10	5	Copa Catalunya	16th	5–25						
2010–11	6	1ª Catalana	5th	17–13						
2011–12	6	1ª Catalana	5th	16–14						
2012–13	6	1ª Catalana	8th	17–13						
2013–14	6	1ª Catalana	8th	17–13						
2014–15	6	1ª Catalana	10th	13–17						
2015–16	6	1ª Catalana	10th	13–17						
2016–17	6	1ª Catalana	16th	5–25						

== Notable players ==
- (Catalonia) Nino Buscató
