= 1976–77 Liga Española de Baloncesto =

1976–77 Liga Nacional de Baloncesto
- League: Liga Nacional
- Sport: Basketball
- Number of teams: 14
- TV partner(s): Televisión Española

Regular Season
- Season champions: Real Madrid

ACB seasons
- ← 1975–76 1977–78 →

The 1976–77 season was the 21st season of the Liga Nacional de Baloncesto. Real Madrid won the title.

== Teams and venues ==
Team	Home city
FC Barcelona	Barcelona
Real Madrid CF	Madrid
CB L'Hospitalet	L'Hospitalet de Llobregat
UDR Pineda	Pineda de Mar
Dico's San Sebastián	San Sebastián
Club Joventut	Badalona
CB Cotonificio	Badalona
CE Manresa	Manresa
CB Estudiantes	Madrid
CB Valladolid	Valladolid
CB Breogán	Lugo
CD Basconia	Vitoria

== Team Standings ==
Pos	Team	Pld	W	D	L	PF	PA	Pts
1	Real Madrid	22	21	0	1	2503	1856	42
2	FC Barcelona	22	20	1	1	2139	1823	41
3	Club Joventut de Badalona	22	15	1	6	2148	1836	31
4	UDR Pineda	22	11	0	11	1899	1926	22
5	Dico's San Sebastián	22	10	0	12	1827	1950	20
6	CB Estudiantes	22	10	0	12	1979	2036	20
7	CB L'Hospitalet	22	9	1	12	1963	2077	19
8	CB Cotonificio	22	9	0	13	1903	1895	18
9	CE Manresa	22	8	1	13	1787	1910	17
10	CD Basconia	22	8	0	14	1970	2103	16
11	CB Valladolid	22	7	0	15	1831	2087	14
12	CB Breogán	22	2	0	20	1692	2142	4

1977 Champion
Real Madrid

== Stats Leaders ==
=== Points ===
Rank	Name	Team	Points	Games	PPG
1.	Bob Guyette	FCB	703	22	32.0
2.	Walter Szczerbiak	RMA	665	22	30.2
3.	Dave Russell	DIC	587	20	29.4
