= 1975–76 Liga Española de Baloncesto =

1975–76 Liga Nacional de Baloncesto
- League: Liga Nacional
- Sport: Basketball
- Number of teams: 14
- TV partner(s): Televisión Española

Regular Season
- Season champions: Real Madrid

ACB seasons
- ← 1974–75 1976–77 →

The 1975–76 season was the 20th season of the Liga Nacional de Baloncesto. Real Madrid won the title.

== Teams and venues ==
Team	Home city
FC Barcelona	Barcelona
Real Madrid CF	Madrid
CB L'Hospitalet	L'Hospitalet de Llobregat
UDR Pineda	Pineda de Mar
Club Águilas	Bilbao
Club Joventut	Badalona
Círculo Católico	Badalona
CE Manresa	Manresa
CB Estudiantes	Madrid
RC Náutico	Santa Cruz de Tenerife
CB Breogán	Lugo
CD Vasconia	Vitoria

== First stage ==
Pos	Team	Pld	W	D	L	PF	PA	Pts	Qualification
1	Real Madrid	22	20	0	2	2263	1616	40	Qualification to Group Title
2	FC Barcelona	22	18	0	4	1890	1611	36	Qualification to Group Title
3	Club Joventut de Badalona	22	15	0	7	1880	1655	30	Qualification to Group Title
4	CB Estudiantes	22	12	0	10	1847	1746	24	Qualification to Group Title
5	Círculo Católico	22	11	0	11	1899	1926	22	Qualification to Group Title
6	CD Manresa	22	10	2	10	1824	1813	22	Qualification to Group Title
7	CB L'Hospitalet	22	8	1	13	1646	1828	17	Qualification to Relegation Group
8	UDR Pineda	22	8	0	14	1753	1868	16	Qualification to Relegation Group
9	CD Vasconia	22	8	0	14	1677	1870	16	Qualification to Relegation Group
10	CB Breogán	22	8	0	14	1722	2061	16	Qualification to Relegation Group
11	Club Águilas	22	7	0	15	1637	1971	14	Qualification to Relegation Group
12	RC Náutico	22	6	1	15	1852	1968	13	Qualification to Relegation Group

== Second stage ==
=== Title group ===
Pos	Team	Pld	W	D	L	PF	PA	Pts
1	Real Madrid	32	29	0	3	3276	2446	58
2	FC Barcelona	32	23	0	9	2711	2446	46
3	Club Joventut de Badalona	32	20	0	12	2736	2522	40
4	CB Estudiantes	32	17	0	15	2673	2538	34
5	Círculo Católico	32	13	2	17	2626	2740	28
6	CD Manresa	32	13	0	19	2582	2633	26

1977 Champion
Real Madrid

=== Relegation group ===
Pos	Team	Pld	W	D	L	PF	PA	Pts
7	CB L'Hospitalet	32	14	1	17	2499	2638	29
9	CD Vasconia	32	14	0	18	2537	2696	28
8	UDR Pineda	32	14	0	18	2625	2715	28
10	CB Breogán	32	14	0	18	2604	2955	28
11	RC Náutico	32	10	1	21	2700	2789	21
12	Club Águilas	22	9	0	23	2460	2911	18

== Stats Leaders ==
=== Points ===
Rank	Name	Team	Points	Games	PPG
1.	Walter Szczerbiak	RMA	895	29	30.9
1.	Bob Fullarton	BRE	968	32	30.3
3.	Ed Johnson	MAN	958	32	29.9
