= Real Madrid Baloncesto B =

Real Madrid B
- Leagues: Tercera FEB
- Founded: 1931 (re-founded in 1998)
- History: CB Fiesta Alegre (1931–1957); Club Hesperia (1957–1960); Real Madrid B (1998–present)
- Arena: Ciudad Real Madrid
- Location: Madrid, Spain
- Team colors: White, Purple, Grey
- President: Florentino Pérez
- Head coach: Javier Juárez
- Website: realmadrid.com
Home	Away

Real Madrid Baloncesto B is the reserve team of Real Madrid. The team currently plays in the amateur level 4th tier level league of Spain, the Tercera FEB.

== History ==
The reserve team of Real Madrid was founded in 1955, as CB Fiesta Alegre, but it had played games since 1931. Fiesta Alegre was also known later as, Club Hesperia. With this name it played during three seasons, in the Liga Nacional, the top-tier level Spanish league, and in a final of the Copa del Rey (Spanish Cup). Hesperia was the only reserve team which could play in these games. Hesperia resigned from its place in the league in 1960.

In 1998, the team was re-founded, and since then, it has continued competing, despite a break between 2003 and 2006. In 2006, it started to play in the LEB 2 division.

=== Squad information ===
Note: Flags indicate national team eligibility at FIBA-sanctioned events. Players may hold other non-FIBA nationalities not displayed.

Real Madrid roster
Players
Coaches

Pos.	No.	Nat.	Name	Ht.	Age
SF	5	(Uruguay)	Solé, Maximilano (C)	1.95 m (6 ft 5 in)	38 – 7 April 1988
SF	8	(Spain)	Silva-Brito, Owen	2.00 m (6 ft 7 in)	23 – 8 January 2003
PG	10	(Spain)	Hernández, Nikolás	1.83 m (6 ft 0 in)	21 – 9 September 2004
SF	18	(Spain)	Miller, Baba	2.04 m (6 ft 8 in)	22 – 7 February 2004
SF	19	(Spain)	Santacruz, Harold	2.05 m (6 ft 9 in)	22 – 20 May 2004
SG	20	(Spain)	Garuba, Sediq	1.92 m (6 ft 4 in)	22 – 2 February 2004

Head coach

- (Spain) Javier Juárez

Legend

- (C) Team captain
- Injured

- Roster
Updated: May 5, 2023

== Season by season ==
=== As Club Hesperia ===
Season	Tier	Division	Pos.	W–L	Copa del Rey
1957–58	1	1ª División	6th	7–11	Fifth position
1958–59	1	1ª División	8th	8–1–13	Semifinalist
1959–60	1	1ª División	5th	14–1–7	Runner-up

=== Since its re-foundation in 1998 ===
Season	Tier	Division	Pos.	W–L
1998–99	3	Liga EBA	5th	19–11
1999–00	3	Liga EBA	7th	14–12
2000–01	4	Liga EBA	3rd	22–8
2001–02	4	Liga EBA	3rd	24–10
2002–03	4	Liga EBA	4th	20–10
2003–06	Did not enter any competition			
2006–07	3	LEB 2	18th	7–27
2007–08	4	LEB Bronce	6th	19–16
2008–09	4	LEB Bronce	15th (Note: Despite being relegated to Liga EBA, the club was invited to LEB Plata after the dissolution of the LEB Bronce.)	9–21
2009–10	3	LEB Plata	16th (Note: Resigned to continue playing in LEB Plata.)	12–16
2010–11	4	Liga EBA	2nd	22–10
2011–12	4	Liga EBA	4th	24–6
2012–13	4	Liga EBA	5th	17–11
2013–14	4	Liga EBA	3rd	24–9
2014–15	4	Liga EBA	1st	22–7
2015–16	4	Liga EBA	6th	16–10
2016–17	4	Liga EBA	3rd (Note: Resigned to play the final stage as it was played during the same dates as the final of the Next Generation Tournament.)	23–7
2017–18	4	Liga EBA	4th	23–7
2018–19	4	Liga EBA	2nd	24–6
2019–20	4	Liga EBA	3rd	17–6
2020–21	4	Liga EBA	1st	16–2
2021–22	4	Liga EBA	1st	20–9

== Notable players ==
Note: Flags indicate national team eligibility at FIBA-sanctioned events. Players may hold other non-FIBA nationalities not displayed.

Criteria

To appear in this section a player must have either:

- Set a club record or won an individual award while at the club
- Played at least one official international match for their national team at any time
- Played at least one official NBA match at any time.

- (Argentina) Nicolás Richotti
- (Bosnia and Herzegovina) Nedžad Sinanović
- (Brazil) Felipe dos Anjos
- (Bulgaria) Konstantin Kostadinov
- (Croatia) Bojan Bogdanović
- (Czech Republic) Ondřej Starosta
- (Estonia) Henri Veesaar
- (Greece) Nikos Pappas
- (Italy) Matteo Spagnolo
- (Montenegro) Dino Radončić
- (Poland) Maciej Lampe
- (Romania) Emanuel Cățe
- (Senegal) Mansour Kasse
- (Slovenia) Luka Dončić
- (Slovenia) Urban Klavžar
- (Spain) Pablo Aguilar
- (Spain) Izan Almansa
- (Spain) Víctor Arteaga
- (Spain) Jonathan Barreiro
- (Spain) Antonio Bueno
- (Spain) Dani Díez
- (Spain) Usman Garuba
- (Spain) Hugo González
- (Spain) Eduardo Hernández-Sonseca
- (Spain) Willy Hernangómez
- (Spain) Iñaki de Miguel
- (Spain) Baba Miller
- (Spain) Nikola Mirotić
- (Spain) Juan Núñez
- (Spain) Santiago Yusta
- (Russia) Egor Dëmin
- (Serbia) Mario Nakić
- (Serbia) Tristan Vukčević
- (Sweden) Melwin Pantzar
- (Uruguay) Maximiliano Solé
