= Bob Guyette =

American dentist and basketball player

Robert "Bob" Guyette (born August 29, 1953, in Ottawa, Illinois) is an American former professional basketball player, who played five seasons in the Spanish League. At a height of 6' 9", he played at the power forward position. After his playing days, he became an oral and maxillofacial surgeon.

== College career ==
Guyette played for three varsity seasons with the Kentucky Wildcats, where he averaged 9.0 points and 6.4 rebounds per game. He also played on the junior varsity team as a freshman, since at the time, freshmen weren't eligible to play on the varsity squad. In 1975, he played in the NCAA Final against the UCLA Bruins, in which they lost 92–85. Guyette had 16 points and 7 rebounds in that game.

== Professional career ==
Guyette was selected in the 49th position of the 1975 NBA draft by the Kansas City-Omaha Kings, and also by the New York Nets at the 39th position in the fourth round of in the 1975 ABA Draft, but he eventually signed for FC Barcelona of the Spanish League. With Barcelona, he managed to win three Spanish King's Cup titles, in 1978, 1979 and 1980, and he was the top scorer of the King's Cup Final in 1978. He was also the top scorer of the Spanish League competition in 1977, averaging 32.0 points per game. Ultimately, a sciatica injury ended his playing career.

== Career after basketball ==
Guyette returned to the US, and earned a dental degree from the University of Kentucky College of Dentistry, followed by a medical degree from the University of Alabama School of Medicine. He is currently running a maxillofacial surgery clinic, in Scottsdale, Arizona.
