= 1970–71 Liga Española de Baloncesto =

Liga Española de Baloncesto
- Season: 1970–71
- Games played: 132
- Teams: 12
- TV partner: TVE

Finals
- Champions: Real Madrid (13th title)
- Runners-up: Juventud Nerva

Statistical leaders
- Points: Alfredo Pérez

Records
- Biggest home win: Real Madrid 116–57 Estudiantes (6 December 1970)
- Biggest away win: Ignis Mataró 58–97 Real Madrid (28 November 1970)
- Highest scoring: Picadero 128–82 Breogán (21 February 1971)
- Winning streak: 17 games Juventud Nerva
- Losing streak: 7 games Ignis Mataró

The 1970–71 Liga Española de Baloncesto season was the 15th season of the Liga Española de Baloncesto and was played between 10 October 1970 and 7 March 1971. The season ended with Real Madrid winning their 13th title.

== Overview before the season ==
12 teams joined the league, including two promoted from the 1969–70 Segunda División.

Promoted from 1969 to 1970 Segunda División

- Manresa Kan's
- Breogán Fontecelta

== Teams and locations ==
Location of teams in 1970–71 Liga Española de Baloncesto
Location of teams in 1970–71 Liga Española de Baloncesto (Canary Islands)

Team	Home city
Águilas Schweppes	Bilbao
Barcelona	Barcelona
Breogán Fontecelta	Lugo
Estudiantes	Madrid
Ignis Mataró	Mataró
Juventud Nerva	Badalona
Kas	Bilbao
Manresa Kan's	Manresa
Náutico	Santa Cruz de Tenerife
Picadero Damm	Barcelona
Real Madrid	Madrid
San José Irpen	Badalona

== Regular season ==
=== League table ===
Pos	Team	Pld	W	D	L	PF	PA	PD	Pts	Qualification or relegation
1	Real Madrid (C)	22	21	0	1	2070	1442	+628	42	Qualification to FIBA European Champions Cup
2	Juventud Nerva	22	21	0	1	1866	1451	+415	42	Qualification to FIBA European Cup Winners' Cup
3	Picadero Damm	22	13	3	6	1701	1614	+87	29	Qualification to FIBA Korać Cup
4	Manresa Kan's	22	11	1	10	1648	1645	+3	23	Qualification to FIBA Korać Cup
5	Kas	22	11	0	11	1664	1635	+29	22	
6	Barcelona	22	11	0	11	1715	1666	+49	22	
7	Náutico	22	9	0	13	1470	1707	−237	18	
8	Estudiantes	22	8	0	14	1612	1636	−24	16	
9	Breogán Fontecelta (O)	22	8	0	14	1547	1816	−269	16	Relegation playoffs
10	San José Irpen (O)	22	7	1	14	1498	1631	−133	15	Relegation playoffs
11	Ignis Mataró (R)	22	5	1	16	1426	1677	−251	11	Relegation
12	Águilas Schweppes (R)	22	4	0	18	1532	1829	−297	8	Relegation

Source: Linguasport
(C) Champions; (O) Play-off winners; (R) Relegated

== Relegation playoffs ==
Team 1	Agg.	Team 2	1st leg	2nd leg
Breogán Fontecelta	133–131	Vasconia	79–64	54–67
Real Canoe	120–127	San José Irpen	65–55	55–72

== Statistics leaders ==
=== Points ===
Rank	Name	Team	Points
1	(Spain) Alfredo Pérez	Breogán Fontecelta	595
2	(Spain) Clifford Luyk	Real Madrid	448
3	(Spain) Juan Martínez	Manresa Kan's	443
4	(Spain) José Sagi-Vela	Kas	442
5	(Spain) Juan María Monsalve	San José Irpen	440
