= 1979–80 Liga Española de Baloncesto =

1979–80 Liga Nacional de Baloncesto
- League: Liga Nacional
- Sport: Basketball
- Number of teams: 14
- TV partner(s): Televisión Española

Regular Season
- Season champions: Real Madrid
- Top scorer: (United States) Nate Davis (VAD)

ACB seasons
- ← 1978–79 1980–81 →

The 1979–80 season was the 24th season of the Liga Nacional de Baloncesto, a basketball league in Spain. Real Madrid Baloncesto won the title.

== Teams and venues ==
Team	Home city
FC Barcelona	Barcelona
Real Madrid CF	Madrid
CB Areslux Granollers	Granollers
CN Helios	Zaragoza
CB Miñón Valladolid	Valladolid
Club Joventut	Badalona
CB Cotonificio	Badalona
Manresa EB	Manresa
CB Estudiantes	Madrid
CB Tempus	Madrid
CB Mollet	Mollet del Vallès
CD Basconia	Vitoria

== Team Standings ==
Pos	Team	Pld	W	D	L	PF	PA	Pts
1	Real Madrid	22	20	0	2	2440	1954	40
2	FC Barcelona	22	19	0	3	2303	1923	38
3	Club Joventut de Badalona	22	15	0	7	2022	1911	30
4	CB Cotonificio	22	13	1	8	2037	1896	27
5	Areslux Granollers	22	9	3	10	1962	2037	21
6	Manresa EB	22	10	0	12	1955	1993	20
7	CB Tempus	22	8	3	11	2152	2203	19
8	CB Estudiantes	22	9	1	12	1864	1980	19
9	Miñón Valladolid	22	9	1	12	2129	2263	19
10	CN Helios	22	6	3	13	2030	2157	15
11	CD Basconia	22	5	2	15	1839	2031	12
12	CB Mollet	22	1	2	19	1871	2256	4

1980 Champion
Real Madrid

== Stats Leaders ==
=== Points ===
Rank	Name	Team	Points	Games	PPG
1.	Nate Davis	VAD	654	22	29.7
2.	Wayne Brabender	RMA	618	22	28.1
3.	Mike Phillips	MOL	557	22	27.9
