= Lars Hansen (basketball) =

Danish-Canadian basketball player

Personal information
- Born: September 14, 1954 (age 72) Copenhagen, Denmark
- Listed height: 6 ft 10 in (2.08 m)
- Listed weight: 225 lb (102 kg)

Career information
- High school: Centennial Secondary (Coquitlam, British Columbia)
- College: Washington (1972–1976)
- NBA draft: 1977: 7th round, 151st overall pick
- Drafted by: Los Angeles Lakers
- Playing career: 1976–1982
- Position: Centre
- Number: 22

Career history
- 1976–1978: Cinzano Milano
- 1978–1979: Seattle SuperSonics
- 1979–1980: Eldorado Roma
- 1980–1981: OAR Ferrol
- 1981–1982: FC Barcelona Bàsquet

Career highlights
- Spanish League Top Scorer (1981); Second-team All-Pac-8 (1976)
- Stats at NBA.com
- Stats at Basketball Reference

Lars Erik Hansen (born September 27, 1954) is a Danish-Canadian former basketball center in the National Basketball Association for the Seattle SuperSonics. He also was a member of the Cinzano Milano, Eldorado Roma, OAR Ferrol and FC Barcelona Bàsquet in Europe. He played college basketball for the Washington Huskies.

Hansen contributed to the Canada men's national basketball team finishing in eighth-place at the 1974 FIBA World Championship, for the first time in twenty years. He participated in the 1976 Summer Olympics in Montreal, helping Canada to a fourth-place finish. In 2006, he was inducted into the Canadian Basketball Hall of Fame. In 2014, he was inducted into the BC Sports Hall of Fame.

== Early years ==
Hansen was born in Copenhagen, Denmark. In 1956, two years after his birth, his family settled in Coquitlam, British Columbia. He later became a basketball star at Centennial Secondary School.

In 1971, he led the team to the B.C. High School Boys' provincial semifinals, losing to Vancouver College. In 1972, the team won the B.C. Provincial title, while he received AAA Provincial tournament MVP honors for the second straight year and the Vic Andrews Award winner as the B.C. High School Athlete of the year. He also practiced baseball as a pitcher.

== College career ==
Hansen accepted a basketball scholarship from the University of Washington. Hansen appeared in 95 games during his college career, averaging 9.9 points and 6.3 rebounds per game. He also played on the baseball team as a pitcher and was offered a contract by the Texas Rangers of Major League Baseball as a junior.

As a freshman in the 1972–73 season, he was named the starter at center, averaging 7.1 points and 5.4 rebounds per contest.

As a sophomore in the 1973–74 season, with the arrival of center James Edwards, he had a backup role. He also missed 5 games with a chipped bone in his wrist. He posted 6.8 points and 5.8 rebounds per game.

As a junior in the 1974–75 season, he was moved to a sixth man role from the bench, averaging 10.3 points and 6.2 rebounds per game.

As a senior in the 1975–76 season, he was named the starter at power forward, averaging 14.2 points (third on the team) and 7.5 rebounds (led the team) per game. He also contributed to the team having a 22–6 record, qualifying for the school's first NCAA basketball tournament appearance since 1953 and finishing the regular season ranked No. 11. This was also the last team to defeat (103–81) a John Wooden squad, as the legendary coach would retire after the season, having won his 10th National Championship.

== Professional career ==
Hansen was selected by the Chicago Bulls in the third round (37th overall) of the 1976 NBA draft. He instead opted to sign with the Cinzano Milano in Italy's second-tier Serie A2 Basket, where he averaged 19.2 points per game during the 1976–77 season. He was selected by the Los Angeles Lakers in the seventh round (151st overall) of the 1977 NBA draft. He decided to remain in Italy, where he played for the Cinzano Milano in the 1977–78 season.

On September 14, 1978, he signed as a free agent with the Chicago Bulls. He was waived on October 10. On December 15 of that year, he was signed by the Seattle SuperSonics to a 10-day contract. He later signed a contract for the balance of the season. He appeared in 15 games as a backup behind Jack Sikma, averaging 5.1 points and 3.9 rebounds. He was part of the franchise's title season and became the first Canadian to appear on an NBA championship roster. He also holds the distinction as being the first Denmark-born player in the NBA. On January 18, 1979, he was released make room for Center Dennis Awtrey.

On April 12, 1979, he was signed by the Kansas City Kings. He was released on September 26. Later that year, he signed with Eldorado Roma in Italy's Lega Basket Serie A. In 1980, he moved to play in the Spain's Liga ACB with the OAR Ferrol for the 1980–81 season, where he led the league in scoring and rebounding, while being named Player of the Year. In the 1981–1982 season, he signed with the FC Barcelona Bàsquet, contributing to the team winning the Spanish league championship. He also competed in the European Cup of Champions. He retired from professional basketball in 1983.

== Career statistics ==
Legend
GP	Games played	GS	Games started	MPG	Minutes per game
FG%	Field goal percentage	3P%	3-point field goal percentage	FT%	Free throw percentage
RPG	Rebounds per game	APG	Assists per game	SPG	Steals per game
BPG	Blocks per game	PPG	Points per game	**Bold**	Career high

=== NBA ===
==== Regular season ====
Year	Team	GP	MPG	FG%	FT%	RPG	APG	SPG	BPG	PPG
1978–79	Seattle	15	13.7	.509	.581	3.9	.9	.1	.1	5.1
