= Francisco Buscató =

Spanish basketball player

Francesc Buscató
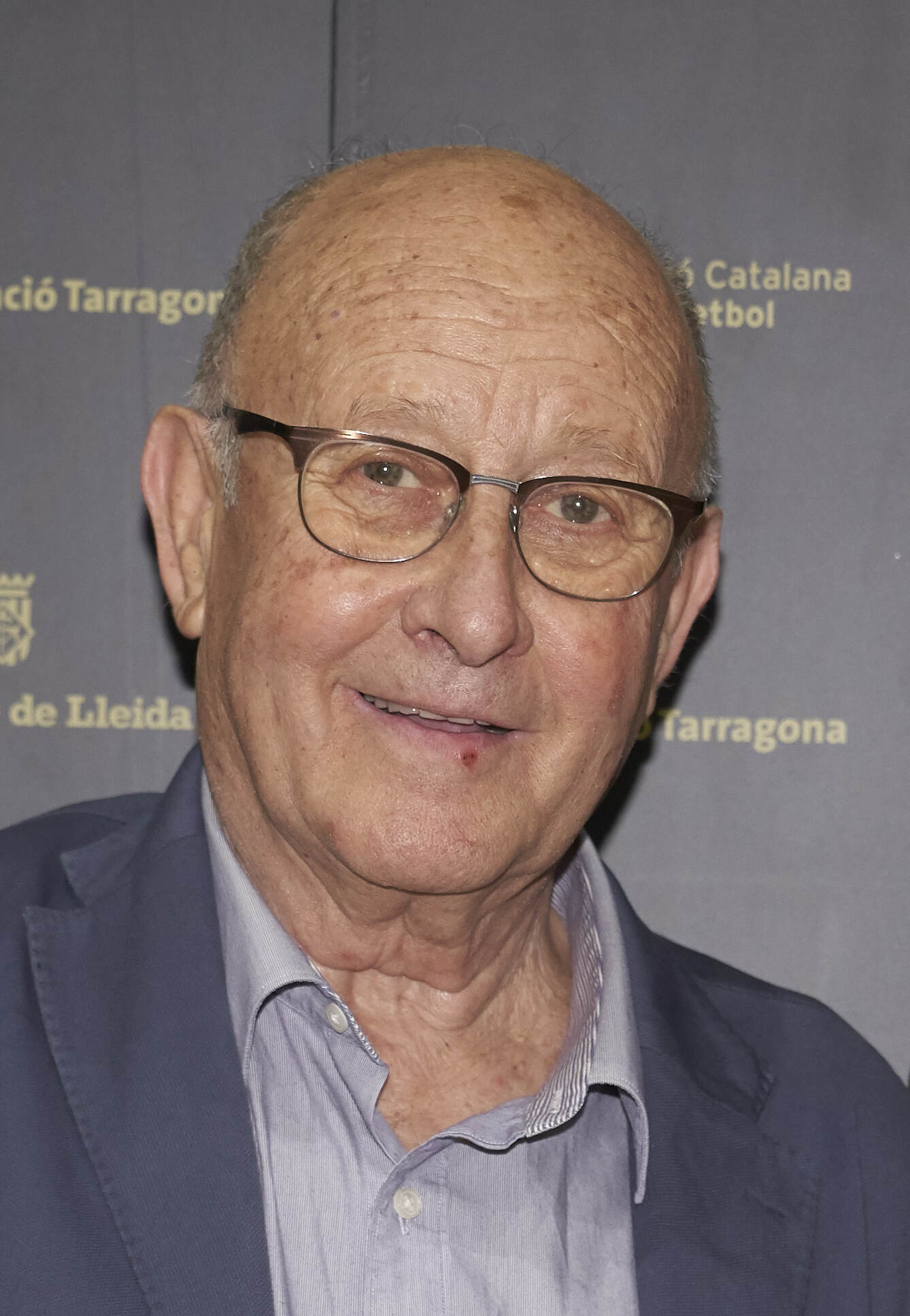

Personal information
- Born: 21 April 1940 (age 86) Pineda de Mar, Spain
- Listed height: 5 ft 10 in (1.78 m)
- Listed weight: 146 lb (66 kg)

Career information
- Playing career: 1955–1974
- Position: Point guard
- Coaching career: 1974–1992

Career history

Playing
- 1955–1957: Pineda de Mar
- 1957–1960: FC Barcelona
- 1960–1964: Aismalíbar Montcada
- 1964–1974: Joventut Badalona

Coaching
- 1974–1975: Joventut Badalona
- 1975–1980: FC Barcelona (Juniors)
- 1980–1981: L'Hospitalet
- 1992: Catalonia

Career highlights
- As player: 5× FIBA European Selection (1968–1971, 1973); 2× Spanish League champion (1959, 1968); 2× Spanish Cup winner (1959, 1969); 50 Greatest FIBA Players (1991)
Medals
Men's basketball
Representing Spain
FIBA EuroBasket
Silver medal – second place	1973 Spain

Francesc "Nino" Buscató Durlán (born 21 April 1940), commonly known as either Nino Buscató or Francisco Buscató, is a Spanish former professional basketball player and basketball coach. At 5 feet 10 inches (1.78 m) tall, he played at the point guard position. He was named to the FIBA European Selection five times (1968, 1969, 1970, 1971, 1973), and he was also named one of FIBA's 50 Greatest Players in 1991. In 1970 he shared UNESCO International Fair Play Award with another Spaniard, soccer player Pedro Zaballa.

== Club career ==
Buscató spent the major part of his club career playing with FC Barcelona and Joventut Badalona. He won two Spanish League championship titles (1959, 1968) and two Spanish Cups (1959, 1969).

== National team career ==
Buscató represented at international competition the senior Spain national team (1959–1973). He won a EuroBasket silver medal at the EuroBasket 1973, and was named to the All-Tournament Team, averaging 11 points per game in the tournament. He also competed at three Olympic Games.
