= Picadero JC =

Spanish sports club

Picadero
- Founded: 1951
- Folded: 1989
- Based in: Barcelona
- Championships: see above

Picadero Jockey Club, also known until 1970 as Picadero Damm for sponsorship reasons, was a Spanish multisports club from Barcelona founded in 1951.

== History ==
Overall the club enjoyed its golden era during the 1960s. Throughout this decade its men's basketball team won two Spanish Cups in 1964 and 1968 and was the runner-up of the Spanish League for three years in a row (1964–66) and in 1970, while its women's basketball reached the Spanish Cup's final in 1960 and was the following year the first Spanish team to enter the Women's Basketball European Cup after CD Cottet renounced for financial reasons, losing to Sportif Casablancais in the qualification round.

While Picadero is most remembered for its basketball teams, the club's baseball section was its most successful team in the international scene, winning the inaugural edition of the European Cup in 1963 and a second trophy five years later. Picadero's team handball team won four Spanish Leagues in a row between 1964 and 1967 and a fifth one in 1970, while its men's volleyball team won the first two editions of the Spanish League in 1965 and 1966. Picadero also had rink hockey, cycling and rugby teams.

The 1970s meant the beginning of the end for Picadero JC as the club collapsed financially. Picadero had to close most of its sections, and soon only the women's basketball team remained. However the team, known for sponsorship reasons as PICEFF Barcelona, Picadero Evax, Íntima Barcelona, Picadero Comansi and finally Natural Cus, experienced its golden years in this period, winning six Spanish Leagues between 1975 and 1983 and reaching the European Cup's quarter-final group stages in 1977 and 1979. In addition the team won seven national Cups, achieving doubles in 1975, 1978, 1980 and 1983. The 1985 Cup was its last national title and the team was also disbanded in 1989, ending Picadero JC's history.

== Baseball section ==
Picadero Damm

Information
- League: Campeonatos de España
- Location: Barcelona
- Ballpark: Estadi de Montjuic
- Founded: 1951
- League championships: 3, (1957, 1962 & 1964)

Picadero Damm was the commercial name of the baseball team from the Picadero JC in Barcelona, Catalonia (Spain) during the heyday of baseball in Spain in the 1950s and 1960s. Picadero Jockey Club is now a defunct sports club who had also basketball and handball teams. The commercial name was due to its main sponsor, S.A. Damm, a well-known Barcelona brewery.

Picadero Damm won the II Copa del Mediterráneo prize in 1965, two European Cups (1963 and 1968) and three Spanish leagues (1957, 1962 and 1964).

=== Titles ===
- 2 European Cups (1963, 1968)
- 1 Mediterranean Cup (1965)
- 3 Spanish Leagues (1957, 1962, 1964)

=== References ===
- Antonio Detrell

== Basketball section ==
Basketball men's team played in the top league, Liga Española de Baloncesto, from 1960 to 1973. In 1973, this section was folded. During these years, Picadero won two King's Cup and played three times in European competitions.

The women's team played in Liga Femenina de Baloncesto until 1985, year were the section was dissolved, and won several leagues and Cups.

=== Season by season (men) ===
Season	Tier	Division	Pos.	W–L	Copa del Rey	European Competitions		
1959–60	2	2ª División						
1960–61	2	2ª División						
1961–62	1	1ª División	4th	10–8	Semifinalist			
1962–63	1	1ª División	4th	11–5	Semifinalist			
1963–64	1	1ª División	2nd	13–9	Winner			
1964–65	1	1ª División	2nd	11–3	Quarterfinalist			
1965–66	1	1ª División	2nd	15–3	Quarterfinalist			
1966–67	1	1ª División	4th	13–7	Quarterfinalist			
1967–68	1	1ª División	6th	9–11	Winner			
1968–69	1	1ª División	3rd	16–6	Semifinalist	2 Cup Winners' Cup	R16	3–1
1969–70	1	1ª División	2nd	18–1–3	Semifinalist			
1970–71	1	1ª División	3rd	13–3–6	Semifinalist			
1971–72	1	1ª División	4th	13–9		3 Korać Cup	QF	0–2
1972–73	1	1ª División	5th	15–15		3 Korać Cup	SF	1–3

=== Titles ===
- Basketball (M)
  - 2 Spanish Cups (1964, 1968)
- Basketball (W)
  - 6 Spanish Leagues (1975, 1976, 1978, 1980, 1981, 1983)
  - 6 Spanish Cups (1973, 1975, 1978, 1979, 1980, 1983)

== Titles ==
=== Handball titles ===
- Handball (W)
  - 5 Spanish Leagues (1964, 1965, 1966, 1967, 1970)

=== Volleyball titles ===
- Volleyball (M)
  - 2 Spanish Leagues (1965, 1966)
  - 2 Spanish Cups (1963, 1965)
