= Liga Española de Baloncesto (1957–1983) =

Spanish Basketball League Liga Española de Baloncesto
- Sport: Basketball
- Founded: 1957
- First season: 1957
- Folded: 1982–83 season (renamed as Liga ACB)
- No. of teams: 14
- Country: Spain
- Continent: (European Union) FIBA Europe (Europe)
- Most titles: Real Madrid (22 titles)
- Broadcaster: TVE
- Level on pyramid: 1st tier
- Related competitions: Spanish King's Cup

The Liga Española de Baloncesto (English: Spanish Basketball League), whose top division was known as Primera División (English: First Division), was the old 1st Tier level basketball league in Spain, from 1957 to the 1982–83 season. It was organized by the Spanish Basketball Federation, and it was contested by the best clubs of the country. In 1983, the clubs decided to create the Basketball Clubs Association, and transformed the top division into the new Liga ACB, although that league was also named Primera División until 1988.

== Format ==
The league was played in a double round-robin format without playoffs. Two points were conceded for a winning game, one for a draw, and no points for the loser. The worst teams of each season were relegated to the second division (Segunda División, called Primera División B since 1978). The winner of the league qualified for the FIBA European Champions Cup (now called EuroLeague).

== History ==
The league was created in 1957 with the aim of publicising the basketball in Spain. In its first edition composed by six teams, two from Madrid (Real Madrid and Estudiantes) and four from the province of Barcelona (Barcelona, Joventut Badalona, Aismalíbar from Montcada i Reixac and Orillo Verde from Sabadell), and played with a double round-robin format. The league was played in 49 days at only two venues: Frontón Vista Alegre in Madrid and Palacio de Deportes de Montjuic in Barcelona.

Two years later, teams from other regions first entered in the league.

== Winners ==
Season	Champion	Runner-up
1957	Real Madrid	FC Barcelona
1958	Real Madrid	Joventut
1958–59	FC Barcelona	Real Madrid
1959–60	Real Madrid	Joventut
1960–61	Real Madrid	Orillo Verde
1961–62	Real Madrid	Joventut
1962–63	Real Madrid	Estudiantes
1963–64	Real Madrid	Picadero JC
1964–65	Real Madrid	Picadero JC
1965–66	Real Madrid	Picadero JC
1966–67	Joventut	Real Madrid
1967–68	Real Madrid	Estudiantes
1968–69	Real Madrid	Joventut
1969–70	Real Madrid	Picadero JC

Season	Champion	Runner-up
1970–71	Real Madrid	Joventut
1971–72	Real Madrid	FC Barcelona
1972–73	Real Madrid	Joventut
1973–74	Real Madrid	FC Barcelona
1974–75	Real Madrid	FC Barcelona
1975–76	Real Madrid	FC Barcelona
1976–77	Real Madrid	FC Barcelona
1977–78	Joventut	Real Madrid
1978–79	Real Madrid	FC Barcelona
1979–80	Real Madrid	FC Barcelona
1980–81	FC Barcelona	Estudiantes
1981–82	Real Madrid	FC Barcelona
1982–83	FC Barcelona	Real Madrid

== Titles ==
Team	Winners	Runners-up
Real Madrid	22	4
FC Barcelona	3	9
Joventut	2	6
Picadero JC	0	4
Estudiantes	0	3
Orillo Verde	0	1

== Liga Nacional Primera División Top Scorers by season ==
Season	Top Scorer	Club	Scoring Average / Total Points
1957	(Spain) Alfonso Martínez	Real Madrid	18.0
1958	(Spain) Alfonso Martínez (2)	Real Madrid	17.2
1958–59	(Puerto Rico) Johnny Báez	Real Madrid	19.9
1959–60	(Spain) Alfonso Martínez (average) (3) (Puerto Rico) Johnny Báez (total points) (2)	Barcelona; Real Madrid	20.2; 439 points
1960–61	(Spain) Francisco Llobet	Orillo Verde	20.4
1961–62	(United States) Wayne Hightower	Real Madrid	19.7
1962–63	(Spain) Emiliano Rodríguez	Real Madrid	19.9
1963–64	(Spain) Emiliano Rodríguez (2)	Real Madrid	22.7
1964–65	(Spain) Lorenzo Alocén	Helios	24.2
1965–66	(United States) Miles Aiken	Águilas	23.9
1966–67	(Spain) Alfonso Martínez (4)	Joventut Badalona	22.1
1967–68	(Spain) Clifford Luyk	Real Madrid	24.3
1968–69	(United States) Charles Thomas	San José Irpen	25.6
1969–70	(United States) Charles Thomas (2)	San José Irpen	24.1
1970–71	(Spain) Alfredo Pérez Gómez	Breogán	27.1
1971–72	(Spain) Gonzalo Sagi-Vela	Estudiantes	21.6
1972–73	(Spain) Alfredo Pérez Gómez (2)	Breogán	23.2
1973–74	(United States) John Coughran	YMCA	31.7
1974–75	(United States) Ray Price	Baskonia	32.2
1975–76	(United States) Walter Szczerbiak (average) (United States) Bob Fullarton (total points)	Real Madrid; Breogán	30.9; 968 points
1976–77	(United States) Bob Guyette	Barcelona	32.0
1977–78	(United States) Essie Hollis	Askatuak	41.0
1978–79	(United States) Nate Davis (average) (United States) Webb Williams (total points)	Askatuak; Baskonia	34.5; 730 points
1979–80	(United States) Nate Davis (2)	Valladolid	29.7
1980–81	(Canada) Lars Hansen	OAR Ferrol	27.4
1981–82	(United States) Larry McNeill	Canarias	34.4
1982–83	(United States) Claude Gregory	Baskonia	30.6

== See also ==
- Liga ACB
- Asociación de Clubs de Baloncesto
- Basketball in Spain
- Primera FEB
