= Essie Hollis =

American basketball player (born 1955)

Essie B Hollis
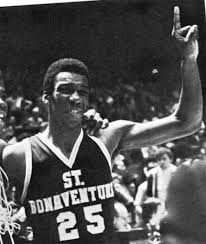
- Hollis at St. Bonaventure

Personal information
- Born: May 16, 1955 (age 71) Erie, Pennsylvania, U.S.
- Listed height: 6 ft 6 in (1.98 m)
- Listed weight: 194 lb (88 kg)

Career information
- High school: Strong Vincent (Erie, Pennsylvania)
- College: St. Bonaventure (1973–1977)
- NBA draft: 1977: 2nd round, 44th overall pick
- Drafted by: New Orleans Jazz
- Playing career: 1977–1990
- Position: Small forward
- Number: 22, 24

Career history
- 1977–1978: Askatuak
- 1978: Rochester Zeniths
- 1978–1979: Detroit Pistons
- 1979–1980: Pallacanestro Chieti
- 1980–1982: Areslux Granollers
- 1982–1983: Mestre 1958
- 1983–1985: Caja de Álava
- 1985–1986: Askatuak
- 1986–1988: Elosúa León
- 1988–1989: Syrius Mallorca
- 1989–1990: Cirsa Hospitalet

Career highlights
- CBA champion (1979); Spanish League Top Scorer (1978); No. 25 retired by St. Bonaventure Bonnies
- Stats at NBA.com
- Stats at Basketball Reference

Essie B Hollis (born May 16, 1955) is an American former professional basketball player. He played at the small forward position. He played college basketball for the St. Bonaventure Bonnies.

== College career ==
Born in Erie, Pennsylvania, Hollis attended St. Bonaventure University, where he played with the Bonnies.

== Professional career ==
Hollis was drafted by the New Orleans Jazz, in the second round of the 1977 NBA draft. He spent one season in the National Basketball Association (NBA), as a member of the Detroit Pistons, during the 1978–79 season. He averaged, 2.8 points, 1.8 rebounds, and 0.2 assists per game. Before, Hollis had played with Askatuak ("The free ones") in Donostia / San Sebastian, Spain in 1977–78. He also played in Italy.

Hollis won a CBA championship with the Rochester Zeniths in 1979.

== Career statistics ==
Legend
GP	Games played	GS	Games started	MPG	Minutes per game
FG%	Field goal percentage	3P%	3-point field goal percentage	FT%	Free throw percentage
RPG	Rebounds per game	APG	Assists per game	SPG	Steals per game
BPG	Blocks per game	PPG	Points per game	**Bold**	Career high

=== NBA ===
==== Regular season ====
Year	Team	GP	MPG	FG%	FT%	RPG	APG	SPG	BPG	PPG
1978–79	Detroit	25	6.2	.400	.750	1.8	.2	.4	.0	2.8
