= Lorenzo Alocén =

Spanish basketball player (1937–2022)

Personal information
- Full name: Lorenzo Alocén Castan
- Nationality: Spanish
- Born: 4 November 1937; Zaragoza, Spain
- Died: 18 January 2022 (aged 84); Barcelona, Spain

Sport
- Sport: Basketball

Lorenzo Alocén Castan (4 November 1937 – 18 January 2022) was a Spanish basketball player. He competed in the men's tournament at the 1968 Summer Olympics. Alocén died on 18 January 2022, at the age of 84.
