= Montgat =

- Municipality
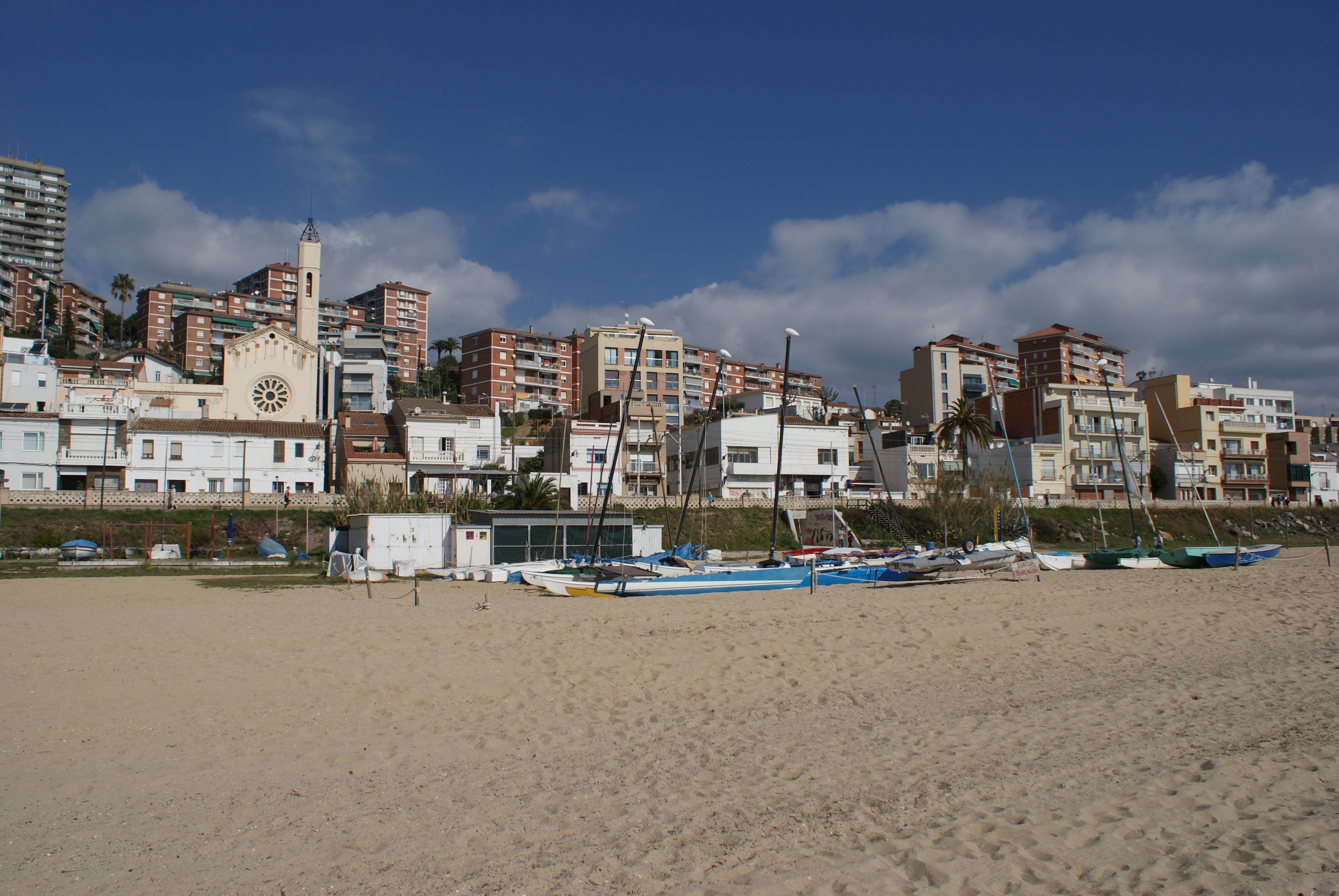

- Flag Coat of arms

- Location in Catalonia Montgat (Spain)
- Coordinates: 41.469°N 2.2805°E
- Autonomous community: Catalonia
- Province: Barcelona

Government
  - Mayor: Andreu Absil Solà

Area
  - Total: 2.9 km^{2} (1.1 sq mi)
- Elevation: 20 m (66 ft)

Population (2025-01-01)
  - Total: 12,879
  - Density: 4,400/km^{2} (12,000/sq mi)
- Website: www.montgat.cat

Montgat (Catalan pronunciation: [muŋˈɡat]) is a municipality in the comarca of the Maresme in Catalonia, Spain. It is situated on the coast between Badalona (Barcelonès) and El Masnou, to the north-east of Barcelona. The town is both a tourist centre and a (somewhat exclusive) dormitory town for Barcelona. The C-31 autopista, B-20 autopista, the main N-II road and a Renfe railway line run through the town.

== Etymology ==
There are several theories about the origin of his name, one of them being that the origin is Iberian, from "Mons-Cot", which means "Mount of Stone". In a document of the Monastery of Sant Pere de les Puel·les, the name "Monte Chato" appears.

== Demography ==
1900	1930	1950	1970	1986	2014
n/a	n/a	2911	5020	7276	11315
