= Emiliano Rodríguez =

Spanish basketball player

Personal information
- Born: 10 June 1937 (age 89) San Feliz de Torío, León, Spain
- Listed height: 6 ft 0 in (1.83 m)
- Listed weight: 180 lb (82 kg)

Career information
- Playing career: 1958–1973
- Position: Small forward

Career history
- 1958–1960: Aismalíbar
- 1960–1973: Real Madrid

Career highlights
- FIBA Order of Merit (1997); FIBA's 50 Greatest Players (1991); 50 Greatest EuroLeague Contributors (2008); EuroBasket MVP (1963); 4× EuroLeague champion (1964, 1965, 1967, 1968); 3× FIBA European Selection (1966, 1969, 1973); 12× Spanish League champion (1961–1966, 1968–1973); 9× Spanish Cup winner (1961, 1962, 1965–1967, 1970–1973); 2× Spanish League Top Scorer (1963, 1964)
- FIBA Hall of Fame
Medals
Men's basketball
Representing Spain
Mediterranean Games
| Silver medal – second place | 1959 Lebanon |
| Silver medal – second place | 1963 Italy |

Emiliano Rodríguez (Spanish pronunciation: [emiˈljano roˈðɾiɣeθ]; born 10 June 1937) is a Spanish retired professional basketball player. He was named one of FIBA's 50 Greatest Players in 1991. He was enshrined into the FIBA Hall of Fame in 2007, and in 2008, Rodríguez was chosen as one of the 50 Greatest EuroLeague Contributors.

== Club career ==
At the club level, Rodríguez played for Aismalíbar (1958–1960), and Real Madrid (1960–1973). With Real, he won four FIBA European Champions' Cups (now called EuroLeague) (1964, 1965, 1967, and 1968), 12 Spanish League titles (1961–1966, 1968–1973) and nine Spanish Cup titles (1961, 1962, 1965–1967, 1970–1973). He was the top scorer of the Spanish League in 1963 and 1964.

== National team career ==
Rodríguez played in 175 games with the senior Spain national basketball team, participating in the 1960 Summer Olympics, the 1968 Summer Olympic Games, and seven EuroBaskets, in the years 1959, 1961, 1963 (named the tournament's MVP), 1965, 1967, 1969, and 1971.
