= Fiesta Alegre fronton =

Fronton in Madrid, Spain

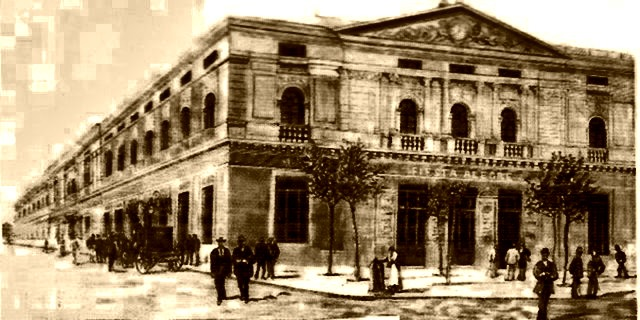
Facade of the Fiesta Alegre fronton.

The Fiesta Alegre fronton was a fronton located on the intersection of the streets Marqués de Urquijo and Juan Álvarez Mendizabal, in the Argüelles area, in Madrid, Spain.

== History ==
The Madrilenian Fiesta Alegre fronton was designed by the architect Francisco Andrés Octavio Palacios and opened to the public in 1892. Originally, it had a 70-meters track and capacity to host 3,500 spectators, an important volume for the time.
