= Pineda de Mar =

- Municipality
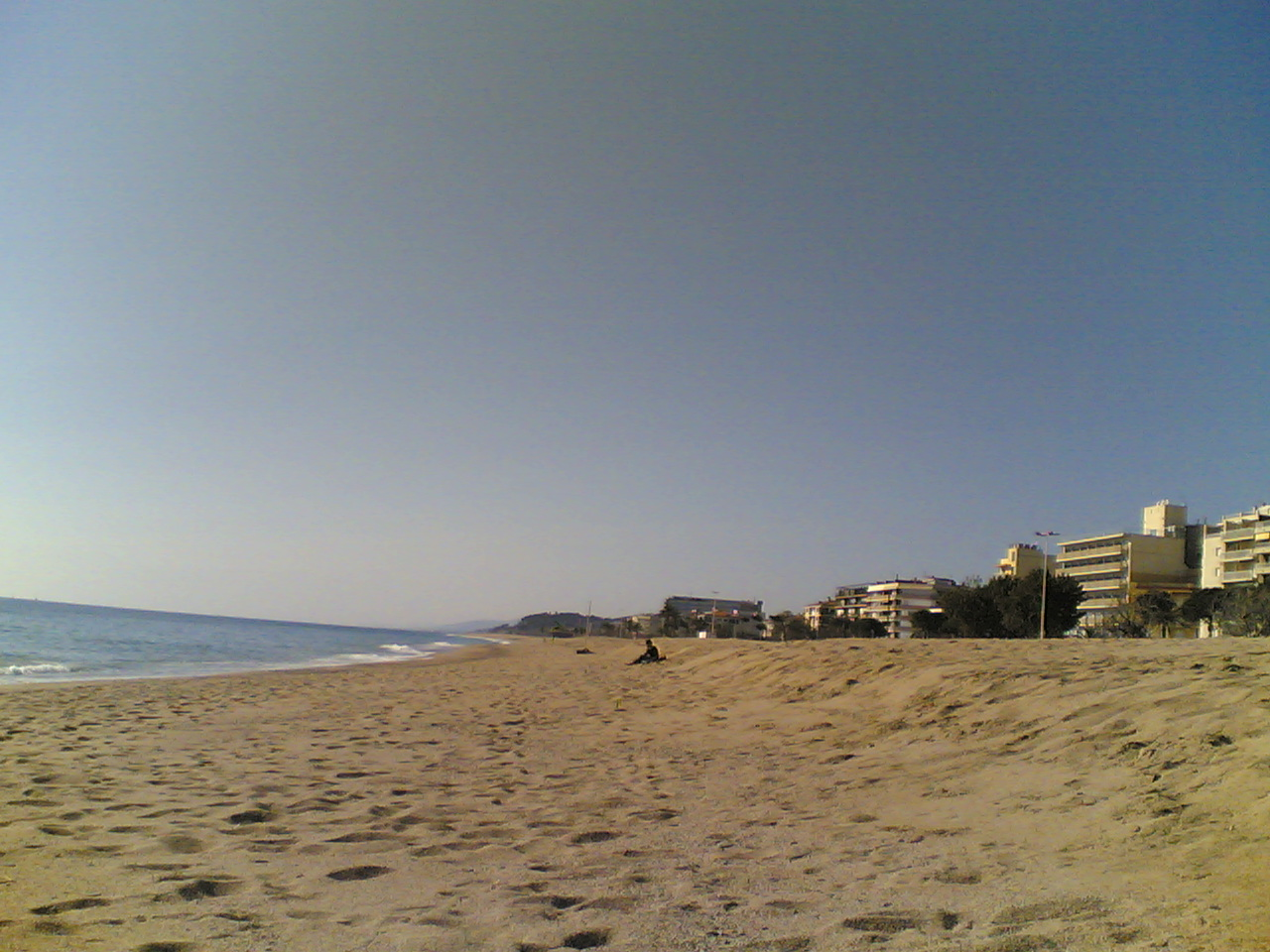

- Coat of arms
- Location of Pineda de Mar
- Location within Catalonia Location within Spain
- Coordinates: 41°37′30″N 2°41′30″E
- Country: Spain
- Community: Catalonia
- Province: Barcelona
- Comarca: Maresme

Government
  - Mayor: Silvia Biosca (2024) (PSC)

Area
  - Total: 10.7 km^{2} (4.1 sq mi)
- Elevation: 10 m (33 ft)

Population (2025-01-01)
  - Total: 30,108
  - Density: 2,810/km^{2} (7,290/sq mi)
- Demonym(s): Pinedenc, pinedenca
- Website: pinedademar.org

Pineda de Mar (Catalan pronunciation: [piˈnɛðə ðə ˈmaɾ]) is a municipality in the comarca of the Maresme in Catalonia, Spain. It is situated on the coast between Calella and Santa Susanna. The main N-II road and a Renfe railway line run through the town.

The town centre has several historical buildings from the 17th to the 19th centuries. Four arches survive of a Roman aqueduct over the Pineda river.

The local basketball team is called UER Pineda.

== Demography ==
1900	1930	1950	1970	1986	2007
1807	3275	3188	7776	13,951	25,568

== Twin towns ==
- Frontignan, France

== Image Gallery ==
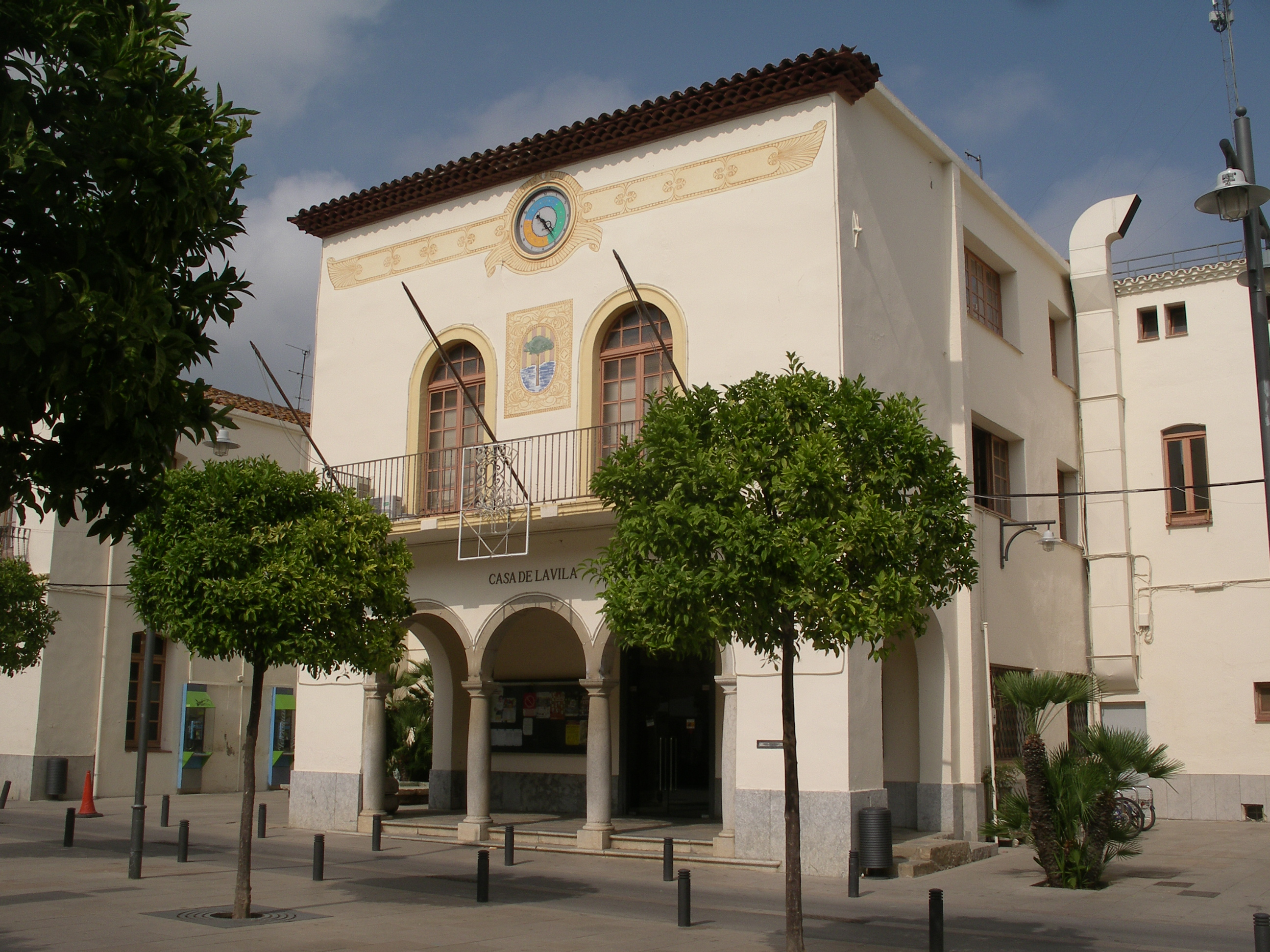
Pineda de Mar's Town Hall

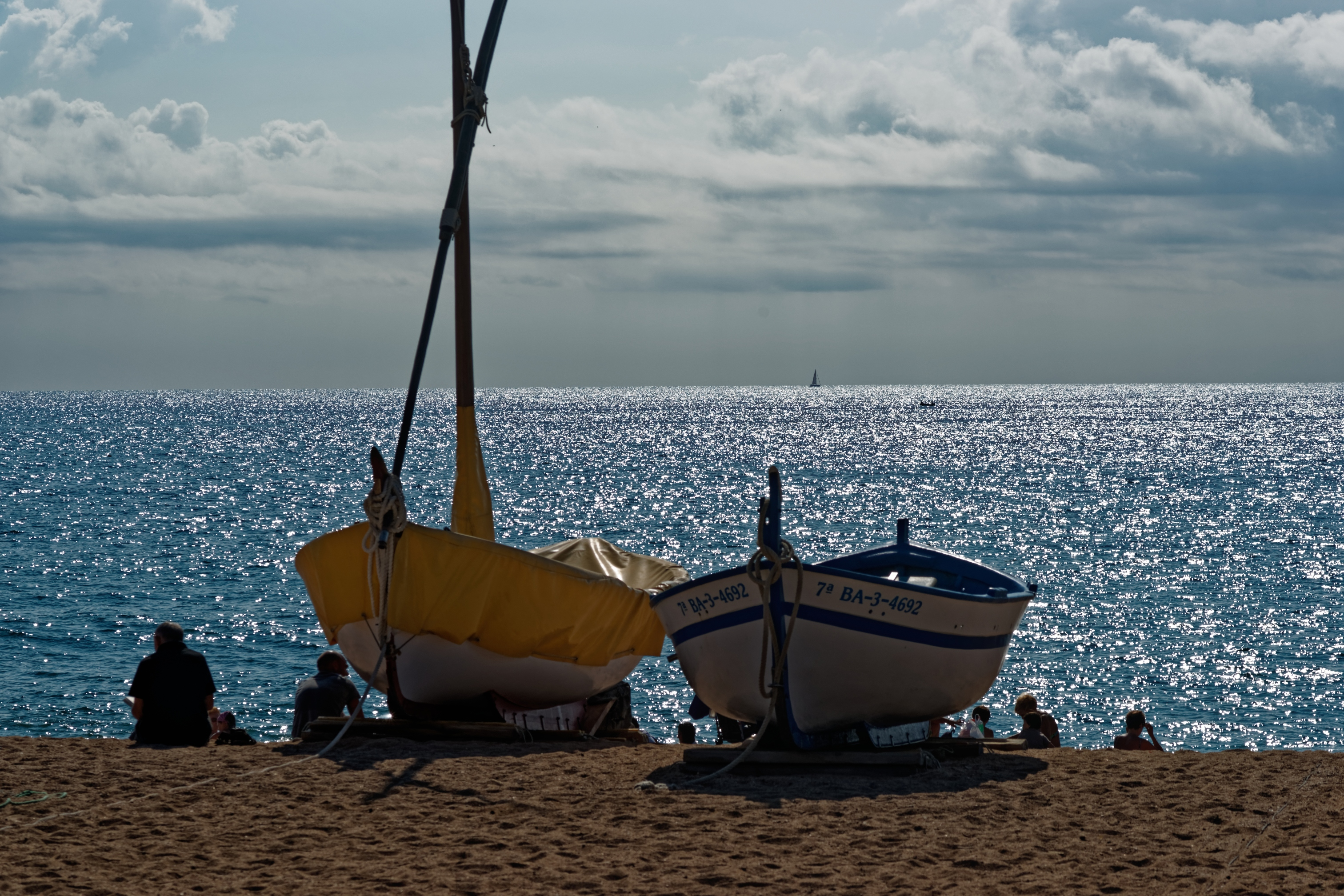
"Els pescadors" beach

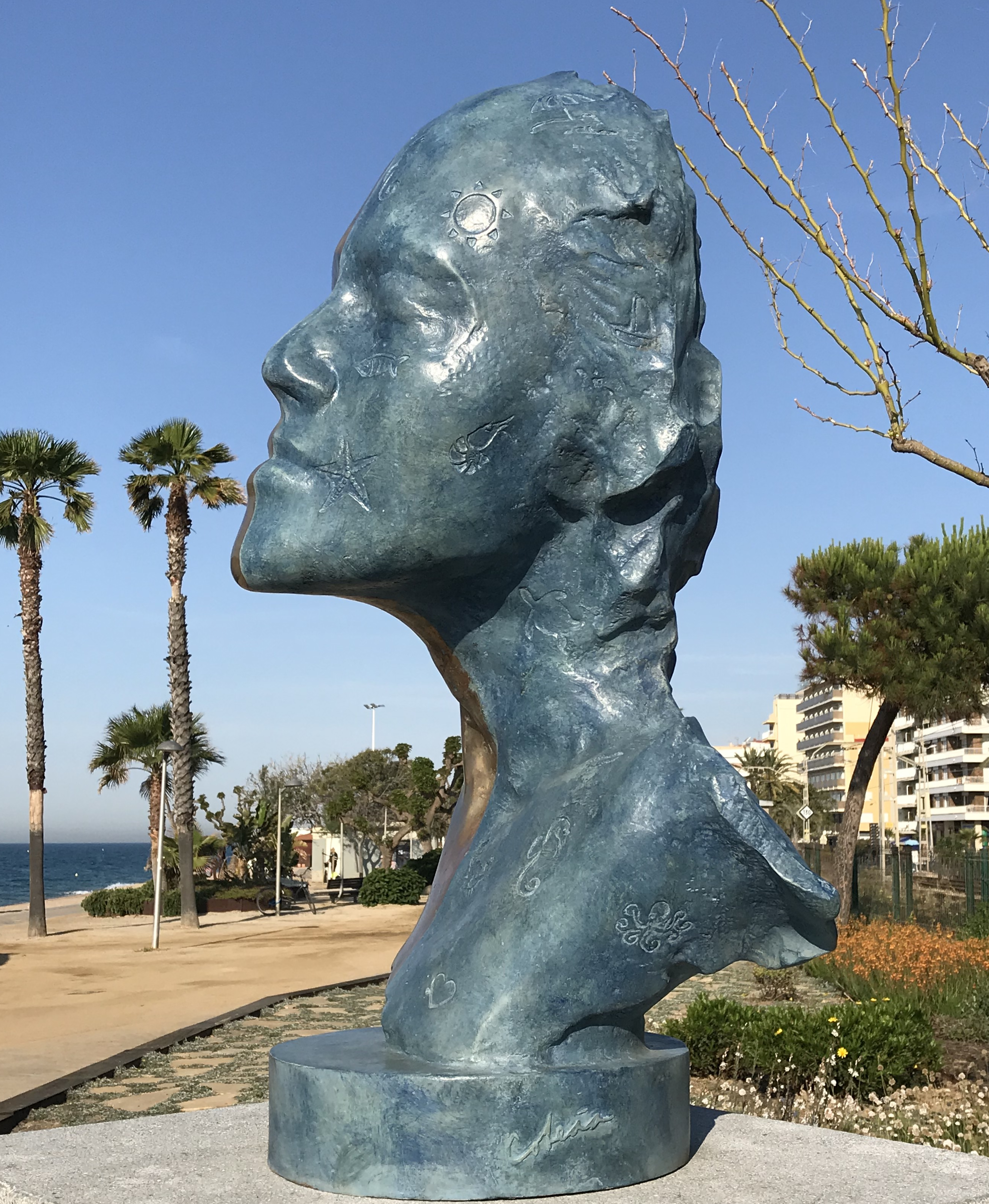
Public sculpture located on the beach (work of Teddy Cobeña)
