= Alfonso Martínez (basketball) =

Spanish basketball player

Personal information
- Full name: Alfonso Martínez Gómez
- Nationality: Spanish
- Born: 24 January 1937 Zaragoza, Spain
- Died: 17 April 2011 (aged 74) Barcelona, Spain

Sport
- Sport: Basketball

Alfonso Martínez (24 January 1937 – 17 April 2011) was a Spanish basketball player. He competed in the men's tournament at the 1960 Summer Olympics and the 1968 Summer Olympics.
