= CB Aismalíbar =

Club Baloncesto Aismalíbar
- Leagues: 1947
- Founded: 1964
- Location: Montcada i Reixac, Catalonia, Spain

Club Baloncesto Aismalíbar was a Spanish basketball club based in Montcada.

== History ==
The origins of the basketball team go back to the year 1947, when the company Aismalíbar created a social club for its workers. The employees created a basketball team that was entered in the Trade Union Work of Education and Leisure League. After several successes in that competition, the company entered a team in the Catalan Basketball Federation under the name CB Aismalíbar.

The Aismalíbar company then made a strong economic investment to make a great team in the 1950s, partly as an advertising medium for business and partly to help basketball grow in the city. They hired as a player-coach Eduardo Kucharski, and players Emiliano Rodriguez, who later would make history at Real Madrid, Francesc Nino Buscató, and center Francisco Borrell, the first player taller than two meters in the history of Spanish basketball.

In the 1956-1957 season Aismalíbar became one of the six founding teams in the league.

The Aismalíbar Moncada was champion of Catalonia but failed to win any major national title. They were runner-up four times for the Generalissimo Cup: 1956, 1957, 1959 and 1964.

In 1957, in a tournament in Sicily, the team defeated Sparta Prague 77-73, becoming the first team from Western Europe to defeat one of the communist bloc teams.

The decline of the club began when the team had to play their games at the Palacio de los Deportes of Barcelona, and not on its track Montcada, due to a rule change. The club was forced to pass on to their best players and in the end, finally disappeared at the end of the 1963-1964 season.

== Honours & achievements ==
Spanish Cup

- Runners-up (4): 1956, 1957, 1959, 1964

Campionat de Catalunya

- Winners (1): 1956
- Runners-up (1): 1957
