= 1998 Copa del Rey de Baloncesto =

62nd edition of Spanish Basketball Cup

The 1998 Copa del Rey was the 62nd edition of the Spanish basketball Cup. It was organized by the ACB and was held in Valladolid at the Pabellón Polideportivo Pisuerga between January 30 and February 2, 1998. Pamesa Valencia won its first title.

== Bracket ==
Quarterfinals; January 29, 30		Semifinals; January 31		Final; February 2
Fórum Valladolid	75
Real Madrid Teka	73	Fórum Valladolid	73
Tau Cerámica	64	Pamesa Valencia	78
Pamesa Valencia	72			Pamesa Valencia	89
Pinturas Bruguer Badalona	86			Pinturas Bruguer Badalona	75
FC Barcelona Banca Catalana	85	TDK Manresa	70
Adecco Estudiantes	82	Pinturas Bruguer Badalona	82
TDK Manresa	87

== Final ==
February 2
20:30 GTM+1

Box Score

Pamesa Valencia	89–75	Pinturas Bruguer Badalona
Scoring by half: 42-41, 47–34
Pts: Swinson 19; Rebs: Rodilla 7 Asts: Luengo, Radunović 3 PIR: Swinson 21		Pts: Espinosa 15; Rebs: Beard 11; Asts: Turner 8 PIR: Turner 19

Pabellón Polideportivo Pisuerga, Valladolid
Attendance: 5,000
Referees: De la Maza, García Ortiz, Arteaga

Copa del Rey 1998 Champions
Pamesa Valencia
First title

- MVP of the Tournament: (Spain) Nacho Rodilla

== See also ==
- ACB
- Copa del Rey de Baloncesto
