= 2010–11 Euroleague Quarterfinals =

Results for Quarterfinals of the 2010–11 Euroleague basketball tournament.

The quarterfinals were played from March 22 to April 6, 2011. Team #1 (i.e., the group winner in each series) hosted Games 1 and 2, plus Game 5 if necessary. Team #2 hosted Game 3, plus Game 4 if necessary.

== Bracket ==
Team 1 hosted Games 1 and 2, plus Game 5 if necessary. Team 2 hosted Game 3, and Game 4 if necessary.

| Team 1 | Agg. | Team 2 | 1st leg | 2nd leg | 3rd leg | 4th leg | 5th leg |
|---|---|---|---|---|---|---|---|
| Caja Laboral (Spain) | 1–3 | (Israel) Maccabi Tel Aviv | 76–70 | 81–83 | 60–81 | 77–99 | |
| FC Barcelona (Spain) | 1–3 | (Greece) Panathinaikos | 83–82 | 71–75 | 74–76 | 67–78 | |
| Real Madrid (Spain) | 3–2 | (Spain) Power Electronics Valencia | 71–65 | 75–81 | 75–66 | 72–81 | 66–58 |
| Olympiacos (Greece) | 1–3 | (Italy) Montepaschi Siena | 89–41 | 65–82 | 72–81 | 76–88 | |

== Quarterfinals ==
=== Quarterfinal 1 ===
Game 1

22 March 2011
20:30

Report

| Caja Laboral (Spain) | 76–70 | (Israel) Maccabi Tel Aviv |
Scoring by quarter: 26–14, 20–18, 15–23, 15–15
| Pts: Barać 17; Rebs: Teletović 11; Asts: Huertas, Logan 5 | | Pts: Hendrix 16; Rebs: Hendrix 16; Asts: Pargo 4 |

Fernando Buesa Arena, Vitoria-Gasteiz
Attendance: 9,450
Referees: Grzegorz Ziemblicki (POL), Sasa Pukl (SLO), Panagiotis Anastopoulos (GRE)

Game 2

24 March 2011
20:30

Report

| Caja Laboral (Spain) | 81–83 | (Israel) Maccabi Tel Aviv |
Scoring by quarter: 22–19, 24–19, 20–27, 15–18
| Pts: Batista, San Emeterio 17; Rebs: San Emeterio, Teletović 8 Asts: Huertas 7 | | Pts: Schortsanitis 22; Rebs: Pargo 8 Asts: Pargo, Perkins 4 |

Fernando Buesa Arena, Vitoria-Gasteiz
Attendance: 9,700
Referees: Luigi Lamonica (ITA), Volodymr Drabikovsky (UKR), Tolga Sahin (ITA)

Game 3

29 March 2011
21:00

Report

| Maccabi Tel Aviv (Israel) | 81–60 | (Spain) Caja Laboral |
Scoring by quarter: 24–23, 17–7, 28–15, 12–15
| Pts: Pargo 23; Rebs: Schortsanitis 8 Asts: Schortsanitis 5 | | Pts: Teletović 14; Rebs: Batista 7 Asts: Huertas 5 |

Nokia Arena, Tel Aviv
Attendance: 11,060
Referees: Zoran Sutulovic (MNE), Spiros Gkontas (GRE), David Chambon (FRA)

Game 4

31 March 2011
20:45

Report

| Maccabi Tel Aviv (Israel) | 99–77 | (Spain) Caja Laboral |
Scoring by quarter: 25–23, 26–29, 28–10, 20–15
| Pts: Pargo 26; Rebs: Hendrix 8 Asts: Pargo 7 | | Pts: Teletović 17; Rebs: Batista 6 Asts: San Emeterio 7 |
Tel Aviv win series 3–1

Nokia Arena, Tel Aviv
Attendance: 11,060
Referees: Christos Christodoulou (GRE), Guerrino Cerebuch (ITA), Matej Boltauzer (SLO)

=== Quarterfinal 2 ===
Game 1

22 March 2011
20:45

Report

| Regal FC Barcelona (Spain) | 83–82 | (Greece) Panathinaikos |
Scoring by quarter: 14–14, 23–21, 20–25, 26–22
| Pts: Navarro 13; Rebs: three players 4 Asts: Lakovič, Navarro 3 | | Pts: Diamantidis 26; Rebs: Fotsis 8 Asts: Diamantidis 2 |

Palau Blaugrana, Barcelona
Attendance: 6,779
Referees: Zoran Sutulovic (MNE), Matej Boltauzer (SLO), Olegs Latisevs (LAT)

Game 2

24 March 2011
21:15

Report

| Regal FC Barcelona (Spain) | 71–75 | (Greece) Panathinaikos |
Scoring by quarter: 17–10, 21–18, 19–28, 14–19
| Pts: Navarro 19; Rebs: Anderson 6 Asts: Navarro, Sada 3 | | Pts: Sato 18; Rebs: three players 4 Asts: Diamantidis 5 |

Palau Blaugrana, Barcelona
Attendance: 7,390
Referees: Guerrino Cerebuch (ITA), Sradan Dozai (CRO), Jakub Zamojski (POL)

Game 3

29 March 2011
20:45

Report

| Panathinaikos (Greece) | 76–74 | (Spain) Regal FC Barcelona |
Scoring by quarter: 16–13, 17–16, 22–20, 21–25
| Pts: Diamantidis 18; Rebs: Tsartsaris 7 Asts: Diamantidis 7 | | Pts: Rubio 16; Rebs: Vázquez 11; Asts: Sada 4 |

Olympic Indoor Hall, Athens
Attendance: 19,000
Referees: Grzegorz Ziemblicki (POL), Sasa Pukl (SLO), Fernando Rocha (POR)

Game 4

31 March 2011
20:45

Report

| Panathinaikos (Greece) | 78–67 | (Spain) Regal FC Barcelona |
Scoring by quarter: 16–12, 18–21, 22–14, 22–20
| Pts: Calathes 12; Rebs: Batiste, Fotsis 6 Asts: Diamantidis 5 | | Pts: Vázquez 14; Rebs: Morris, Vázquez 5 Asts: Lakovič 6 |
Panathinaikos win series 3–1

Olympic Indoor Hall, Athens
Attendance: 19,000
Referees: Luigi Lamonica (ITA), Volodymr Drabikovsky (UKR), Borys Ryzhyk (UKR)

=== Quarterfinal 3 ===
Game 1

22 March 2011
20:45

Report

| Real Madrid (Spain) | 71–65 | (Spain) Power Electronics Valencia |
Scoring by quarter: 20–18, 13–14, 19–21, 19–12
| Pts: Tomić 14; Rebs: Reyes 9 Asts: three players 3 | | Pts: de Colo 15; Rebs: Javtokas 6 Asts: Cook 8 |

Caja Mágica, Madrid
Attendance: 8,345
Referees: Juan Carlos Arteaga (ESP), Juan Carlos Garcia Gonzalez (ESP), Sinisa Herceg (CRO)

Game 2

24 March 2011
20:45

Report

| Real Madrid (Spain) | 75–81 | (Spain) Power Electronics Valencia |
Scoring by quarter: 19–17, 19–18, 16–24, 21–22
| Pts: Llull 18; Rebs: Mirotić 7 Asts: Prigioni 7 | | Pts: Cook 20; Rebs: Savanović 10; Asts: Cook 6 |

Caja Mágica, Madrid
Attendance: 10,112
Referees: José Martín (ESP), Christos Christodoulou (GRE), Milivoje Jovcic (SRB)

Game 3

29 March 2011
20:45

Report

| Power Electronics Valencia (Spain) | 66–75 | (Spain) Real Madrid |
Scoring by quarter: 19–17, 15–14, 17–17, 15–27
| Pts: Savanović 21; Rebs: Javtokas 8 Asts: Cook 8 | | Pts: Fischer 19; Rebs: Fischer 8 Asts: Llull 7 |

Fuente San Luis, Valencia
Attendance: 9,000
Referees: Luigi Lamonica (ITA), Ilija Belosevic (SRB), Elias Koromilas (GRE)

Game 4

31 March 2011
20:45

Report

| Power Electronics Valencia (Spain) | 81–72 | (Spain) Real Madrid |
Scoring by quarter: 17–14, 23–24, 19–17, 22–17
| Pts: Cook 16; Rebs: Javtokas 7 Asts: Cook 7 | | Pts: Tomić 20; Rebs: Veličković 5 Asts: Prigioni 6 |

Fuente San Luis, Valencia
Attendance: 9,000
Referees: Juan Carlos Mitjana (ESP), Dani Hierrezuelo (ESP), Robert Lottermoser (GER)

Game 5

7 April 2011
20:45

Report

| Real Madrid (Spain) | 66–58 | (Spain) Power Electronics Valencia |
Scoring by quarter: 11–17, 29–25, 18–9, 8–7
| Pts: Suárez, Tucker 12; Rebs: Suárez, Reyes 10; Asts: Prigioni 4 | | Pts: Savanović 19; Rebs: Savanović 6 Asts: Cook 3 |
Real Madrid win series 3–2

Caja Mágica, Madrid
Attendance: 12,093
Referees: Volodymr Drabikovsky (UKR), Sasa Pukl (SLO), Tolga Sahin (ITA)

=== Quarterfinal 4 ===
Game 1

22 March 2011
20:00

Report

| Olympiacos (Greece) | 89–41 | (Italy) Montepaschi Siena |
Scoring by quarter: 24–4, 23–5, 14–13, 28–19
| Pts: Mavrokefalidis 15; Rebs: Bourousis 12; Asts: Spanoulis 4 | | Pts: Lavrinovič 12; Rebs: three players 4 Asts: four players 1 |

Peace and Friendship Stadium, Piraeus
Attendance: 10,000
Referees: Ilija Belosevic (SRB), Dani Hierrezuelo (ESP), Recep Ankarali (TUR)

Game 2

24 March 2011
20:45

Report

| Olympiacos (Greece) | 65–82 | (Italy) Montepaschi Siena |
Scoring by quarter: 12–20, 19–19, 20–22, 14–21
| Pts: Mavrokefalides 16; Rebs: Mavrokefalides 7 Asts: Papaloukas, Spanoulis 5 | | Pts: Hairston 19; Rebs: Hairston 11; Asts: Zisis, Kaukėnas 3 |

Peace and Friendship Stadium, Piraeus
Attendance: 13,000
Referees: Juan Carlos Mitjana (ESP), Fernando Rocha (POR), Antonio Conde (ESP)

Game 3

29 March 2011
20:00

Report

| Montepaschi Siena (Italy) | 81–72 | (Greece) Olympiacos |
Scoring by quarter: 21–14, 18–23, 21–13, 21–22
| Pts: Jarić 24; Rebs: Lavrinovič 7 Asts: Kaukėnas 3 | | Pts: Nesterović 16; Rebs: Bourousis 6 Asts: Papaloukas 6 |

Palasport Mens Sana, Siena
Attendance: 5,065
Referees: Juan Carlos Arteaga (ESP), Jose Ramon Garcia Ortiz (ESP), Eddie Viator (FRA)

Game 4

31 March 2011
21:00

Report

| Montepaschi Siena (Italy) | 88–76 | (Greece) Olympiacos |
Scoring by quarter: 29–18, 21–18, 18–25, 20–15
| Pts: Hairston 25; Rebs: Hairston 7 Asts: Zisis 6 | | Pts: Bourousis, Gordon 16; Rebs: Nesterović 6 Asts: Vassilis Spanoulis, Gordon 3 |
Siena win series 3–1

Palasport Mens Sana, Siena
Attendance: 5,070
Referees: José Martín (ESP), Sinisa Herceg (CRO), Milija Vojinovic (SRB)
