= Josep Puerto =

Spanish basketball player (born 1999)

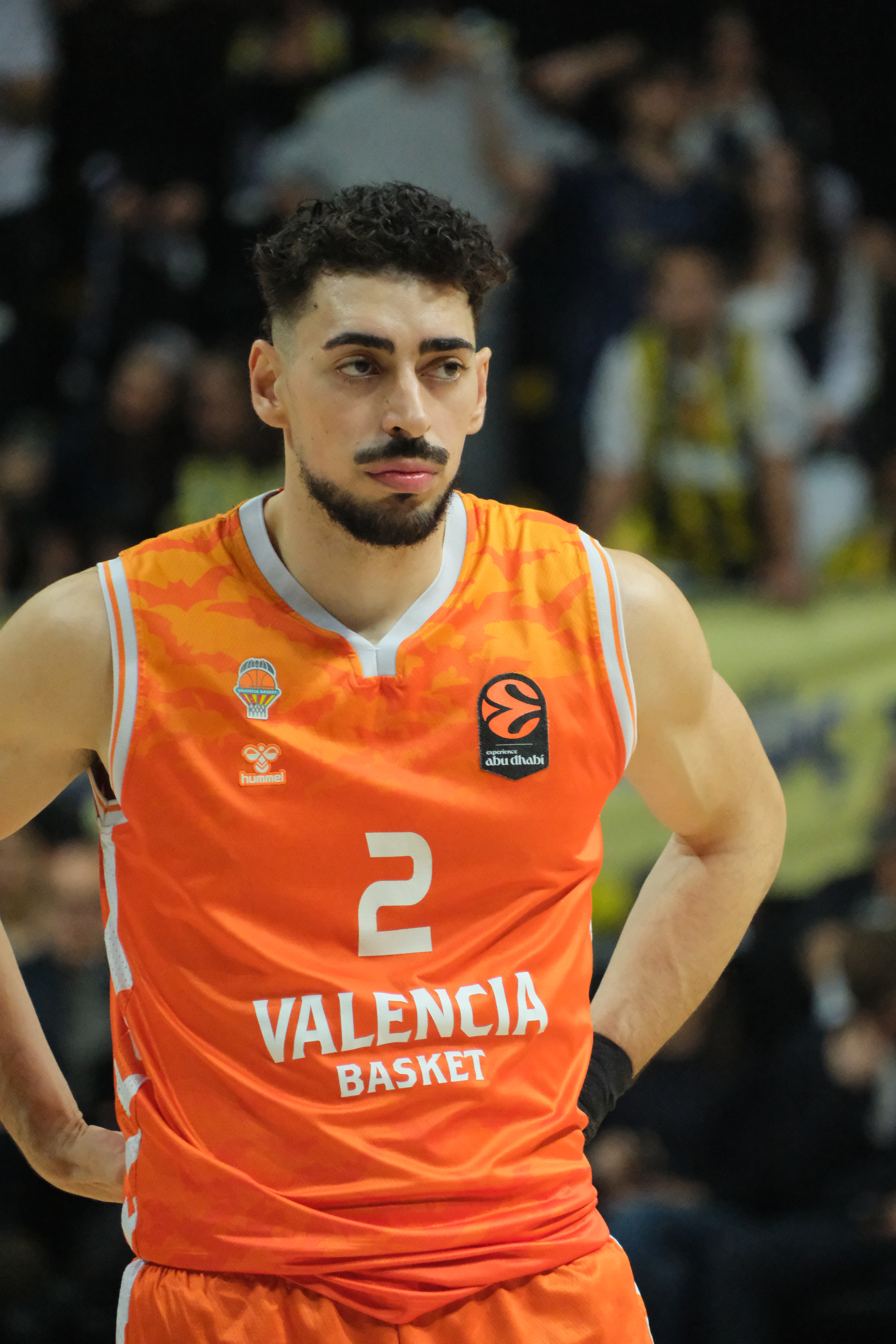
- Puerto with Valencia in 2026

No. 2 – Valencia Basket
- Position: Small forward
- League: Liga ACB; EuroLeague

Personal information
- Born: 8 March 1999 (age 27) Almussafes, Spain
- Listed height: 6 ft 6 in (1.98 m)
- Listed weight: 214 lb (97 kg)

Career information
- Playing career: 2015–present

Career history
- 2015–2018: Valencia B
- 2017–present: Valencia
- 2018–2019: →Oviedo
- 2019–2020: →Castelló

Career highlights
- Liga ACB champion (2026); Spanish Supercup winner (2025)
Medals
Men's basketball
Representing Spain
FIBA U20 EuroBasket
Silver medal – second place	2019 Israel	Team
FIBA U18 EuroBasket
Silver medal – second place	2017 Slovakia	Team

Josep Puerto Guaita (born 8 March 1999) is a Spanish professional basketball player and the team captain for Valencia Basket of the Liga ACB and the EuroLeague. Standing at 1.98 m (6 ft 6 in), he plays in the small forward position. He also represents Spain in international competitions.

== Professional career ==
=== Valencia B and Valencia (2015–2018) ===
Puerto developed his skills at CB Marcelina Benifaió and joined the Valencia Basket youth academy at the U14 level, where he was named to the All-Star Five of the Minicopa tournament held in Vitoria-Gasteiz. He truly blossomed as a first-year Cadet, winning the MVP award in the Valencian Community finals and leading Valencia Basket to the quarterfinals.

Puerto had a fantastic 2015-16 season in Group E of the Liga EBA, consistently ranking among the best in the division and representing Spain at the youth levels. A regular with the Spanish national team since the U14 level, he also participated in numerous tournaments, including two European Championships. However, he was unable to participate in the World Championship in Zaragoza due to personal reasons.

He made his EuroCup debut in the 2015-16 season in the tenth round match between his club and the Belgian team Proximus Spirou Charleroi, while still a junior and the third youngest player to debut for Valencia Basket.

In the 2016-17 season, Puerto was part of the reserve team squad that played in the Liga EBA and trained with the first ACB team, where he was included in the squads to play in the ACB and Eurocup.

On 5 March 2017, Puerto made his Liga ACB debut at the Buesa Arena against Saski Baskonia, where played one minute and 21 seconds, committing two personal fouls and missing a three-pointer. During the 2017-18 season, he became a regular in the first team's training sessions and played in 16 matches, making his EuroLeague debut, curiously also at home to Baskonia.

=== Oviedo and Castelló (2018–2020) ===
In September 2018, Puerto was loaned to Oviedo of the LEB Oro. After only 6 games with the Asturian team, Puerto suffered a back injury that forced Valencia Basket to terminate the loan in order to return to Valencia and recover. He finally ended up playing in a 2018-19 Liga ACB match against Movistar Estudiantes.

During the 2019-20 season, the player was loaned to TAU Castelló of the LEB Oro for one season. This season was very complete, with an average of 7.1 points, 3.1 rebounds and 48.3% in three-pointers.

=== Return to Valencia (2020–present) ===
On 1 September 2020, Valencia Basket reached an agreement with TAU Castelló to loan Puerto back to the Castellón club for a second consecutive season, but on 5 October, they decided to recall him and break the loan agreement, so that he would be part of the Valencia Basket first team in Liga Endesa during the 2020-21 season.

== National team career ==
Puerto's first call-up to the senior national team was for the matches on 21 and 24 February 2022, but he did not make his debut. He was then called up again for the matches against Slovakia on 22 and 25 November 2024, in the EuroBasket qualifiers, finally making his debut on 25 November.

On 2 July 2025, Puerto was added to the senior squad for EuroBasket 2025 and was named to the final squad the following month.
