= 2000 Copa del Rey de Baloncesto =

The 2000 Copa del Rey was the 64th edition of the Spanish basketball Cup. It was organized by the ACB and was played in Vitoria-Gasteiz in the Araba Arena between January 28 and 31, 2000. Estudiantes won its third title.

== Bracket ==
Quarterfinals; January 28, January 29		Semifinals; January 30		Final; January 31
Pamesa Valencia	74
Unicaja Málaga	53	Pamesa Valencia	75
FC Barcelona	73	FC Barcelona	73
Real Madrid	68			Pamesa Valencia	63
Tau Cerámica	65			Adecco Estudiantes	73
Adecco Estudiantes	79	Adecco Estudiantes	80
Caja San Fernando	71	Caja San Fernando	65
Canarias Telecom	60

== Final ==
31 January 2000
21:30 GTM+1

Boxscore

Pamesa Valencia	63–73	Adecco Estudiantes
Scoring by half: 33–30, 30–43
Pts: Hopkins 19; Rebs: Hopkins 15; Asts: Hopkins, Luengo 3 PIR: Hopkins 29		Pts: A. Reyes 26; Rebs: A. Reyes 7 Asts: Azofra, Thompson 5 PIR: A. Reyes 24

Buesa Arena
Attendance: 9,200
Referees: Betancor, Martín Bertrán, Llamazares

Copa del Rey 2000 Champions

Adecco Estudiantes
3rd title

- MVP of the Tournament: Alfonso Reyes
