= Yannick Driesen =

Belgian basketball player

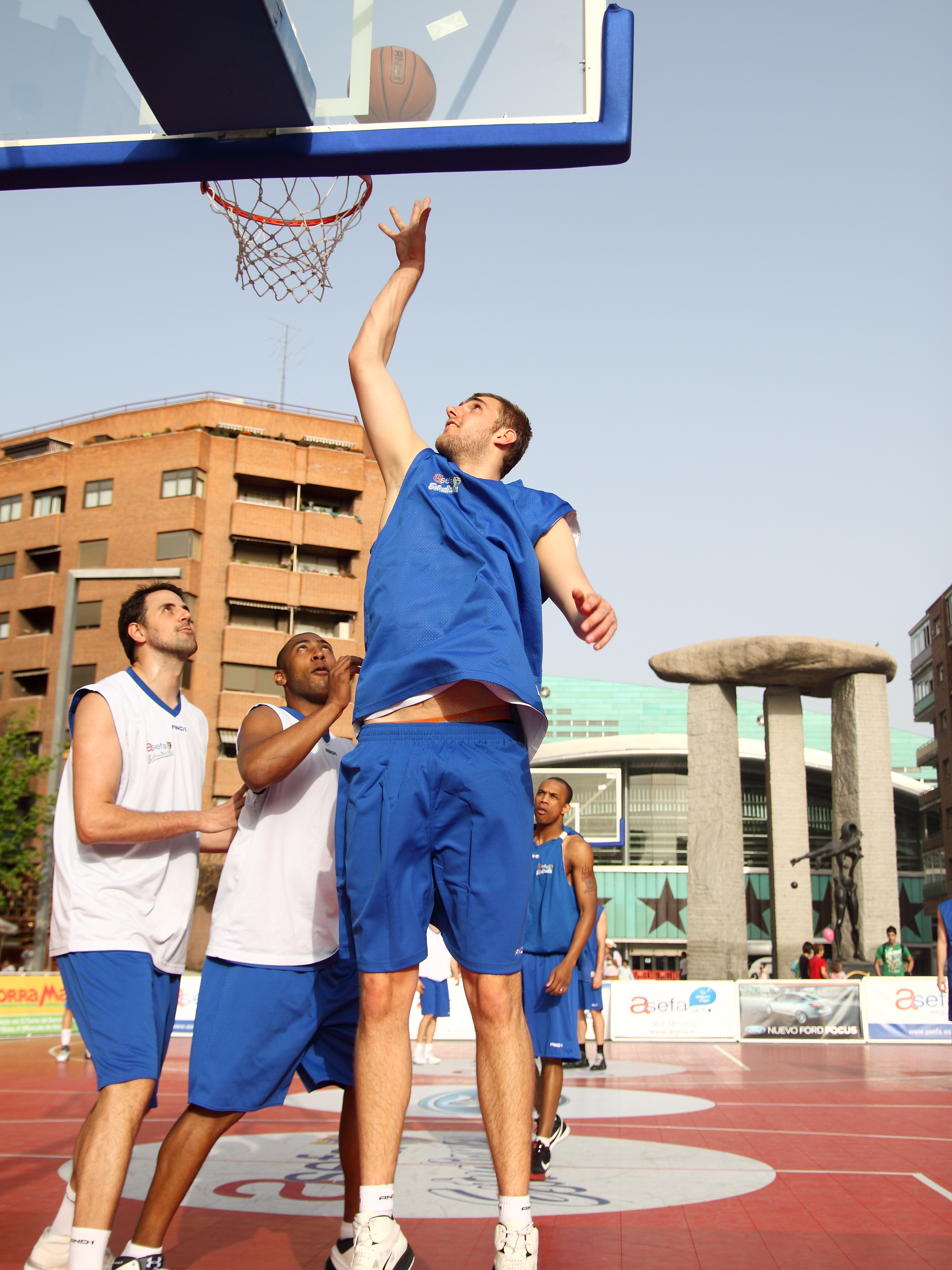
- Driesen, with blue shirt

Personal information
- Born: November 2, 1988 (age 36); Antwerp, Belgium
- Listed height: 2.18 m (7 ft 2 in)

Career information
- Playing career: 2006–present
- Position: Center

Career history
- 2006–2008: Estudiantes
- 2008–2009: Illescas
- 2009: La Palma
- 2009–2012: Estudiantes
- 2012–2014: Antwerp Giants

Yannick Driesen (born November 2, 1988) is a Belgian basketball player. Driesen usually plays as center. Driesen played with the Belgium national basketball team at EuroBasket 2013.
