= Alfonso Reyes (basketball) =

Spanish basketball player

Personal information
- Born: September 19, 1971 (age 55) Córdoba, Spain
- Listed height: 6 ft 7.5 in (2.02 m)
- Listed weight: 265 lb (120 kg)

Career information
- Playing career: 1989–2007
- Position: Center

Career history
- 1989–1993: Estudiantes Caja Postal
- 1993–1997: Unicaja Málaga
- 1997–1998: Racing Paris SG
- 1998–2002: Adecco Estudiantes
- 2002–2004: Real Madrid
- 2004–2007: Leche Río Breogán

Career highlights
- 6× Spanish League All-Star (1995, 1996, 1998, 1999, 2001, 2002); 2× Spanish All-Star Game MVP (1998, 2001); 2× Spanish Cup winner (1992, 2000); Spanish Cup MVP (2000)
Medals
Representing Spain
Men's basketball
EuroBasket
Silver medal – second place	1999 France
Bronze medal – third place	2001 Turkey
Silver medal – second place	2003 Sweden
European U-18 Championship
Bronze medal – third place	1990 Netherlands	U-18 Team

Alfonso Reyes Cabanás (born September 19, 1971) is a retired Spanish professional basketball player. Reyes finished his club playing career with the Spanish club Leche Río Breogán.

== Professional career ==
During his pro career, Reyes won the two Spanish King's Cup tournaments (1992, 2000), and he was named the MVP of the 2000 tournament. He announced his retirement from playing professional basketball in May 2007.

== National team career ==
Reyes played with the senior Spanish national basketball team at the following major FIBA tournaments: the 1995 EuroBasket, the 1997 EuroBasket, the 1998 FIBA World Cup, the 1999 EuroBasket, the 2000 Sydney Summer Olympics, the 2001 EuroBasket, the 2002 FIBA World Cup, and the 2003 EuroBasket.

With Spain, he won a silver medal at the 1999 EuroBasket, a bronze medal at the 2001 EuroBasket, and a silver medal at the 2003 EuroBasket.

== Post-playing career ==
After he retired from playing professional club basketball, Reyes became a civil engineer. He also served as the President of the Spanish Basketball Men's Players' Union (ABP).

== Personal life ==
Reyes' younger brother, Felipe, is also a professional basketball player.

== Awards and accomplishments ==
=== Clubs ===
- 2× Spanish King's Cup Winner with Adecco Estudiantes (1992, 2000)
- 2× Spanish Cup winner (1992, 2000)
- 6× Spanish League All-Star (1995, 1996, 1998, 1999, 2001, 2002)
- 2× Spanish All-Star Game MVP (1998, 2001)

=== Spanish senior national team ===
- EuroBasket 1999: Silver
- EuroBasket 2001: Bronze
- EuroBasket 2003: Silver
