= Valencia Basket =

- Nickname: Taronja / Taronges (Oranges); Clockwork Orange
- Leagues: Liga ACB; EuroLeague
- Founded: 15 July 1986; 40 years ago
- History: Valencia Hoja del Lunes (1986-1987); Pamesa Valencia (1987-2009); Power Electronics Valencia (2009-2011); Valencia Basket Club (2012–present)
- Arena: Roig Arena
- Capacity: 15,600
- Location: Valencia, Spain
- Team colors: Orange and Black
- President: Vicent J. Solà
- Head coach: Xavi Albert
- Ownership: Juan Roig
- Championships: 4 EuroCup; 2 Spanish League; 1 Spanish Cup; 2 Spanish Supercup
- Retired numbers: 5 (9, 11, 14, 15, 17)
- Website: valenciabasket.com
Home	Away	Third

Valencia Basket Club S.A.D., commonly known as Valencia Basket (Valencian: [vaˈlensia ˈbasket]; Spanish: [baˈlenθja ˈβasket]), is a professional basketball team based in Valencia, Spain. The team plays in the Liga Endesa and the EuroLeague. From 1987 to 2025, they played their home games at the Font de Sant Lluís. Since 2025, they have played their games at the Roig Arena, with a capacity of up to 20,000 spectators.

The "Oranges" have a total of fourteen official titles in the men's section and eleven in the women's section. Valencia is the only Spanish club to win the top basketball category in Spain in both sections: the 2016–17 and 2025–26 ACB (in addition to two runner-up finishes), and the 2022–23, 2023–24, 2024–25 and 2025–26 Women's League, as well as the EuroCup (ULEB Cup) on four occasions, where it is the most successful club in competition, and the 2020–21 EuroCup Women.

In the historical classification of the ACB, the men's team is in sixth place, having played 37 seasons in the top category. In 2024, the men's team placed 12th in the FIBA Europe classification and 10th place in the women's classification.

The club is owned by retail tycoon Juan Roig.

== History ==
=== 1986–1997 ===
Valencia Basket was founded on 27 September 1986, after Valencia CF decided to fold its basketball section.

On 4 May 1988, while in its second season in the Primera División B, which was the second-tier league of Spanish basketball at that time, the team won its first promotion to the Spanish top-tier level ACB, where the team remained until the 1994–95 season. In 1995, Valencia was relegated to the Spanish 2nd-tier level EBA League, after falling in the league's relegation playoff against Somontano Huesca. In the next season, after being the runner-up in Liga EBA, in a non-promoting season, Valencia BC bought Amway Zaragoza's ACB place to join the top league, where it has remained until nowadays.

=== 1998–2014 ===
On 2 February 1998, Pamesa Valencia won its first Spanish national title, after beating Pinturas Bruguer Badalona, by a score of 89–75, in the final of the 1998 Copa del Rey, which was played in Valladolid. One year later, on 13 April 1999, the club played in the final of the 1998–99 FIBA Saporta Cup, but was defeated by Benetton Treviso, 64–60, in the final played in Zaragoza. Three years later, the club repeated the same success, but Montepaschi Siena won the final of the 2001–02 FIBA Saporta Cup, by a score of 81–71, in Lyon, France.

Continuing on with some of the club's best years, the 2001–02 ACB season was historic for the club, as it reached the Spanish ACB League finals, where they could not win any games in their series against FC Barcelona. Before this first success in reaching the finals of the Spanish league's playoffs, Pamesa Valencia won its first European-wide title, by defeating Krka Novo Mesto in the 2002–03 ULEB Cup, which would then also allow the club to make its debut in the European top-tier level EuroLeague.

In its first EuroLeague participation, Pamesa Valencia qualified for the Top 16, but was eliminated there, after not contesting its game at Nokia Arena against Maccabi Tel Aviv, adducing security issues in Israel.

On 18 April 2010, Power Electronics Valencia won its second European title, by beating Alba Berlin, 67–44, in the 2010 EuroCup Finals, which was played in Vitoria-Gasteiz. This allowed the club to come back to the top level EuroLeague, seven years after its first participation in the tournament. This time, Valencia reached the EuroLeague quarterfinals, where it was eliminated by Real Madrid, who won the playoff series by a 3–2 margin.

The club's third European-wide 2nd-tier level EuroCup title arrived on 7 May 2014, when Valencia beat UNICS Kazan, in the double-legged finals.

=== 2015–present ===
On 5 June 2017, Valencia Basket qualified for its second Spanish Liga ACB Finals series, after defeating Baskonia in the semifinals of the 2017 national league playoffs. This time, the club won its first ever Spanish national domestic league championship, on 16 June 2017, by defeating Real Madrid with a 3–1 series score in the ACB league's finals. In the same season, the club also reached the finals of both the Copa del Rey (Spanish Cup), and the EuroCup, but they lost those finals to Real Madrid, and fellow Spanish side, Unicaja, respectively. By winning the Spanish League championship, Valencia also sealed their return to the next season's top-tier level EuroLeague competition, for the 2017–18 season.

The club's fourth European-wide 2nd-tier level EuroCup title arrived on 16 April 2019, when Valencia beat Alba Berlin, in the double-legged finals.

In the 2025–26 season, Valencia won its second Spanish League title after 9 years beating Barcelona in 4 games.

== Arena ==
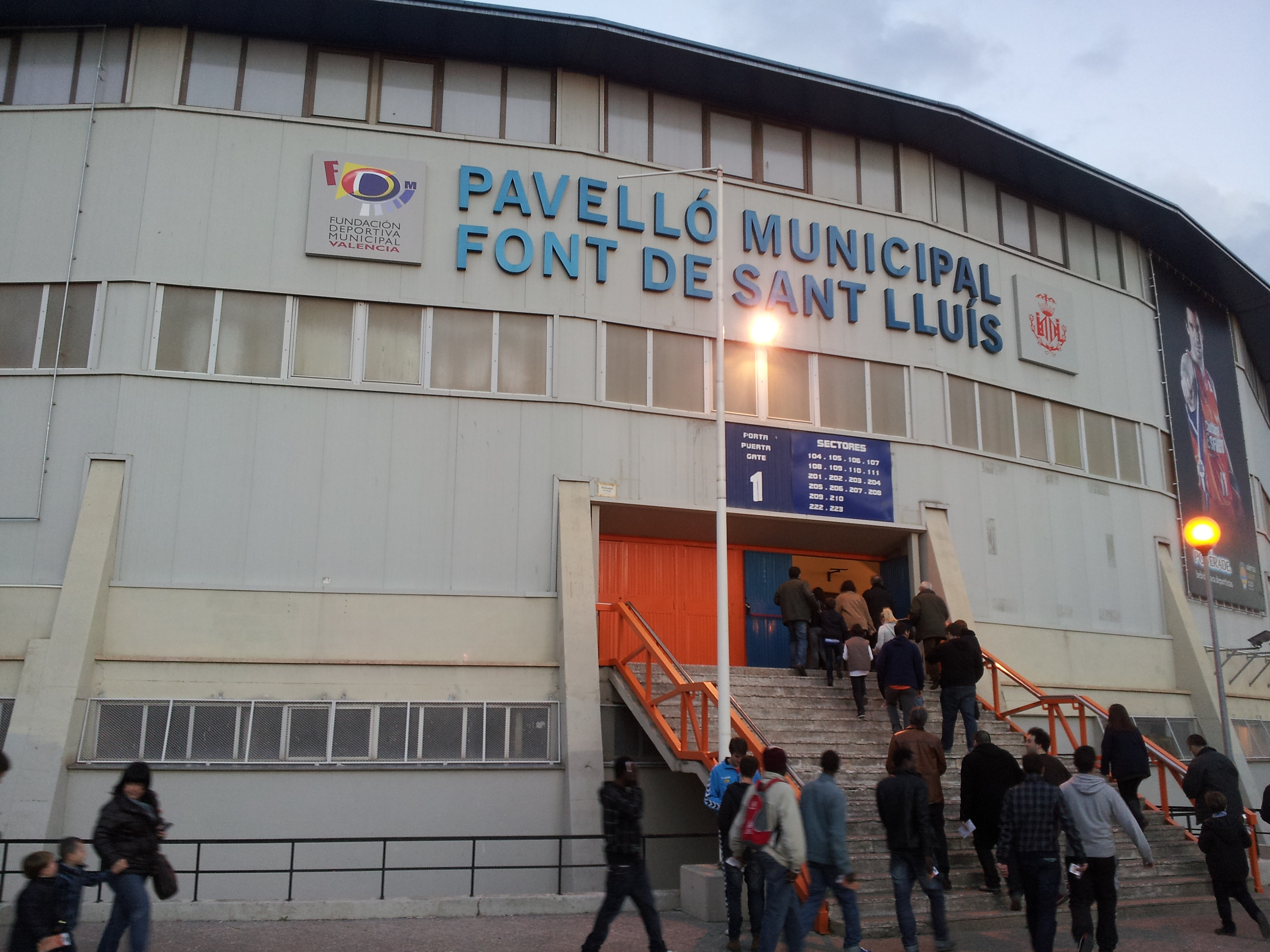
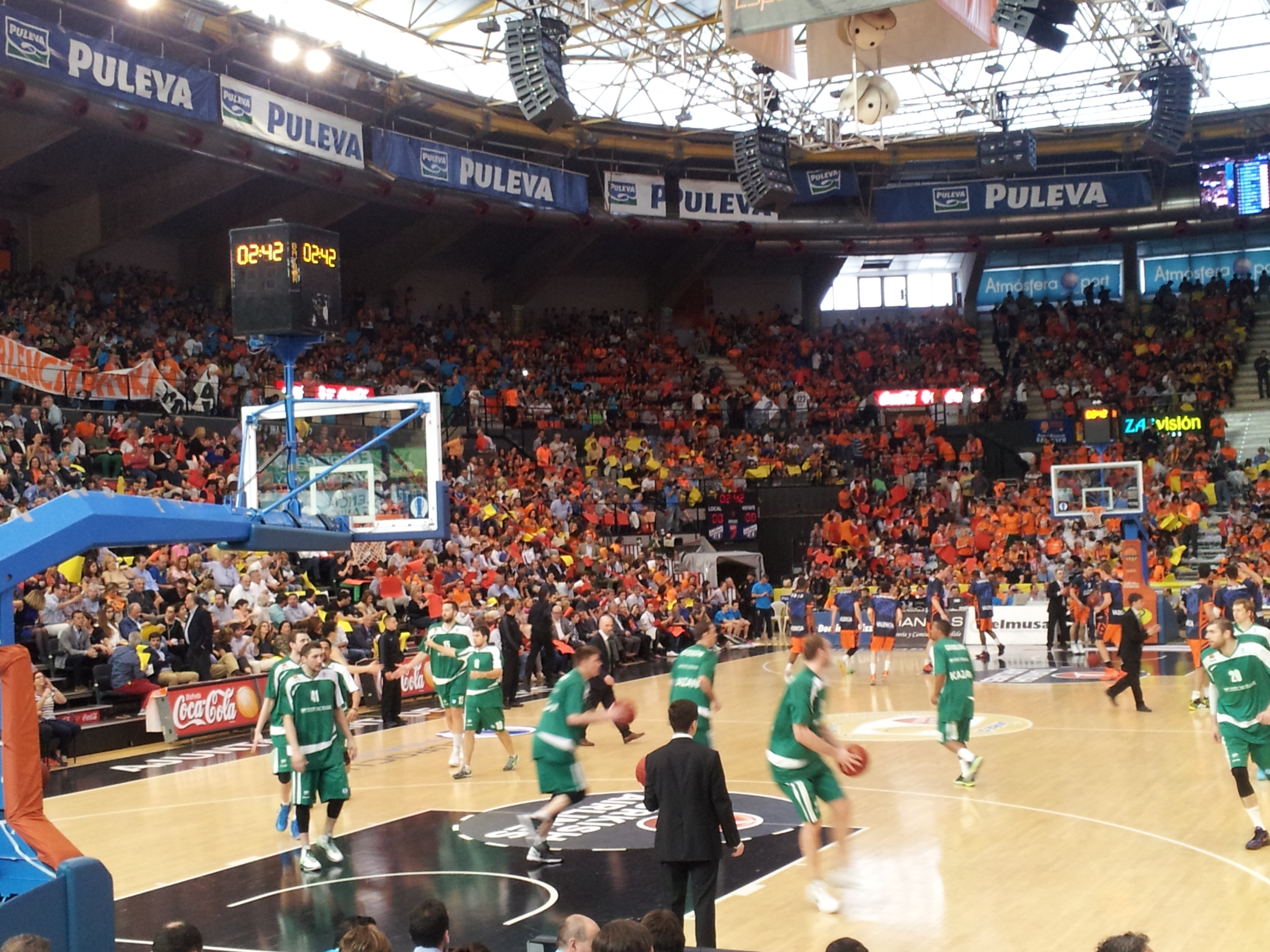
External and internal view of La Fonteta

During its first season of existence, the team played its home games at the La Canaleta Sports Complex in the municipality of Mislata.

Since 1987 Valencia Basket plays its home games at the 8,500 seat Font de Sant Lluís arena. The arena is better known as La Fonteta.

The club is expected to move to a new 15,600-seat arena called Roig Arena (previously proposed as Casal España Arena), with the inauguration scheduled for 2024.

== Sponsorship naming ==
Valencia Basket has had several sponsorship names over the years:

- Valencia-Hoja del Lunes: 1986–1987
- Pamesa Valencia: 1987–2009
- Power Electronics Valencia: 2009–2011

== Logos ==
1987–2009 (The logo during the Pamesa era).

2009–2017 (Original non commercial logo).

2016–2017 (30 year anniversary logo).

2017–present.

2026–2027.

== Players ==
=== Current roster ===
Note: Flags indicate national team eligibility at FIBA-sanctioned events. Players may hold other non-FIBA nationalities not displayed.

Valencia Basket roster
Players
Coaches

Pos.	No.	Nat.	Name	Ht.	Wt.	Age
PG	0	(United States)	Shorts II, TJ	1.79 m (5 ft 10 in)	73 kg (161 lb)	29 – 15 October 1997
SF	1	(United States)	Taylor, Kameron	1.98 m (6 ft 6 in)	91 kg (201 lb)	32 – 5 October 1994
SF	2	(Spain)	Puerto, Josep (C)	1.98 m (6 ft 6 in)	97 kg (214 lb)	27 – 8 March 1999
F/C	3	(United States)	Reuvers, Nate (injured)	2.11 m (6 ft 11 in)	107 kg (236 lb)	28 – 30 September 1998
SG	5	(Spain)	Saint-Supéry, Mario	1.93 m (6 ft 4 in)	90 kg (198 lb)	20 – 14 April 2006
PG	7	(Spain)	Cárdenas, Álvaro	1.85 m (6 ft 1 in)	83 kg (183 lb)	24 – 29 April 2002
F	8	(United States)	Osetkowski, Dylan	2.07 m (6 ft 9 in)	109 kg (240 lb)	30 – 8 August 1996
G	10	(United States)	Moore, Omari	2.00 m (6 ft 7 in)	88 kg (194 lb)	26 – 18 September 2000
G	12	(United States)	Brooks, Armoni	1.91 m (6 ft 3 in)	88 kg (194 lb)	28 – 5 June 1998
F/C	13	(France)	Sako, Neal	2.11 m (6 ft 11 in)	102 kg (225 lb)	28 – 13 August 1998
PF	16	(Senegal)	Gueye, Mouhamadou	2.06 m (6 ft 9 in)	95 kg (209 lb)	28 – 8 July 1998
G	20	(Argentina)	Corbalán, Gonzalo	1.93 m (6 ft 4 in)	88 kg (194 lb)	24 – 3 March 2002
G	23	(Spain)	Marí, Lucas	1.97 m (6 ft 6 in)	90 kg (198 lb)	21 – 20 October 2005
F	33	(Montenegro)	Mirotić, Nikola (injured)	2.08 m (6 ft 10 in)	108 kg (238 lb)	35 – 11 February 1991
F/C	41	(Cuba)	Rivero, Jasiel	2.06 m (6 ft 9 in)	110 kg (243 lb)	33 – 31 October 1993

Head coach

- (Spanish Basketball Federation) Xavi Albert

Assistant coach(es)

- (Spanish Basketball Federation) Israel González
- (Spanish Basketball Federation) Juan Maroto
- (Spanish Basketball Federation) Vicent Revert

Legend

- (C) Team captain
- (Y) Youth player
- Injured

- Roster
- Transactions
Updated: October 16, 2026

=== Depth chart ===
Pos.	Starting 5	Bench 1	Bench 2	Bench 3	Inactive
C	Neal Sako °	Jasiel Rivero ^			Nate Reuvers ° (injured)
PF	Dylan Osetkowski °	Mouhamadou Gueye ^			Nikola Mirotić † (injured)
SF	Kameron Taylor *	Gonzalo Corbalán †	Josep Puerto †	Lucas Marí †
SG	Mario Saint-Supéry †	Omari Moore °	Armoni Brooks *
PG	TJ Shorts II °	Álvaro Cárdenas †

Notes: Blue † – homegrown player; (Note: A homegrown player is a player that played for at least three years before the age of 20 on a Spanish team. In Liga ACB, the team must register at least four homegrown players in rosters of 10–12 players or at least three homegrown players in rosters of 8–9 players. In EuroLeague, the team did not have any limitations regarding the number of homegrown players.) Red * – overseas player; (Note: An overseas player is a player from outside EEA, FIBA Europe or ACP states. In Liga ACB, the team may register at most two overseas players. In EuroLeague, the team did not have any limitations regarding the number of overseas players.) Purple °; – community player (Note: Comunitarios (loosely translated as "Community players") refers to any player who holds a passport from a country within the European Union (EU), the European Economic Area (EEA), or an associated nation with specific treaties. In Liga ACB, if a European player signs with a Spanish team, they are registered as a Comunitario. Teams can theoretically sign an unlimited number of these players, provided they still satisfy the mandatory homegrown quota (cupos).) Gold ^; – cotonou status player (Note: Cotonou status is a massive roster loophole in European basketball. It allows players from 78 African, Caribbean, and Pacific (ACP) countries to be treated exactly like EU citizens (Comunitarios) for employment purposes. In Liga ACB, a player with a passport from a Cotonou country does not count toward the maximum limit of 2 non-EU imports.) Green ‡ – youth player (Note: In Liga ACB, the team may register under-22 players linked to the youth system. In EuroLeague, the team may register under-20 players linked to the youth system.)

=== Players out on loan ===
Players out on loan
Nat.	Player	Position	Team
(Mali)	Oumar Ballo	C	(Turkey) Galatasaray
(Spain)	Álex Blanco	PG	(Spain) Palmer Basket
(United States)	Wildens Leveque	C	(Spain) CB Menorca
(Latvia)	Tomas Talcis	SF	(Latvia) Rīgas Zeļļi

=== Retired numbers ===
Valencia Basket retired numbers
No	Nat.	Player	Position	Tenure	Date retired
9	(Belgium)	Sam Van Rossom	PG	2013–2023	May 10, 2025
11	(Spain)	Nacho Rodilla	PG	1994–2003	September 17, 2006
14	(Montenegro)	Bojan Dubljević	C/PF	2012–2023	
15	(Spain)	Víctor Luengo	SG/SF	1992–2007	October 5, 2009
17	(Spain)	Rafa Martínez	SG	2008–2019	October 2, 2022

=== FIBA Hall of Famers ===
Valencia Basket Hall of Famers
Players
No.	Nat.	Name	Position	Tenure	Inducted
44	(France)	Antoine Rigaudeau	G	2003–2005	2015
14	(Argentina)	Fabricio Oberto	C	2002–2005	2019
10	(Central African Republic)	Romain Sato	SF	2013–2017	2024

== Head coaches ==
- Toni Ferrer: 1986–87, 1989
- Antoni Serra: 1987–89
- José Antonio Figueroa: 1989–91
- Fernando Jiménez: 1991
- Manu Moreno: 1992–95
- Herb Brown: 1995
- Mihajlo Vuković: 1995–2000
- Luis Casimiro: 2000–02
- Paco Olmos: 2002–04, 2011–12
- Pablo Laso: 2004–05
- Chechu Mulero: 2005, 2006
- Ricard Casas: 2005–06
- Fotios Katsikaris: 2006–08
- Neven Spahija: 2008–10
- Manolo Hussein: 2010
- Svetislav Pešić: 2010–11
- Velimir Perasović: 2012–15
- Carles Duran: 2015
- Pedro Martínez: 2015–17, 2024–26
- Txus Vidorreta: 2017–18
- Jaume Ponsarnau: 2018–21
- Joan Peñarroya: 2021–22
- Álex Mumbrú: 2022–24
- Xavi Albert: 2024, 2026–present

== Season by season ==
Season	Tier	Division	Pos.	W–L	Copa del Rey	Other cups		European competitions		
1986–87	2	1ª División B	19th	14–20						
1987–88	2	1ª División B	8th	24–19						
1988–89	1	Liga ACB	16th	12–27	First round					
1989–90	1	Liga ACB	10th	27–12	Round of 16					
1990–91	1	Liga ACB	9th	18–22	Second round					
1991–92	1	Liga ACB	9th	21–19	Second round					
1992–93	1	Liga ACB	10th	19–15	Second round					
1993–94	1	Liga ACB	12th	15–17	First round					
1994–95	1	Liga ACB	19th	16–26	First round					
1995–96	2	Liga EBA	2nd (Note: Bought the ACB berth to Amway Zaragoza.)	28–10						
1996–97	1	Liga ACB	11th	17–17						
1997–98	1	Liga ACB	7th	21–17	Champion					
1998–99	1	Liga ACB	6th	20–19	Quarterfinalist			2 Saporta Cup	RU	17–2
1999–00	1	Liga ACB	6th	20–17	Runner-up			2 Saporta Cup	QF	13–3
2000–01	1	Liga ACB	5th	23–15	Semifinalist			2 Saporta Cup	SF	11–5
2001–02	1	Liga ACB	6th	22–16	Quarterfinalist			2 Saporta Cup	RU	13–4
2002–03	1	Liga ACB	2nd	32–13	Semifinalist			2 ULEB Cup	C	14–4
2003–04	1	Liga ACB	5th	24–14	Quarterfinalist			1 Euroleague	T16	13–7
2004–05	1	Liga ACB	9th	18–16	Semifinalist			2 ULEB Cup	SF	11–1–4
2005–06	1	Liga ACB	9th	16–18	Runner-up					
2006–07	1	Liga ACB	7th	20–18						
2007–08	1	Liga ACB	5th	23–14	Quarterfinalist			2 ULEB Cup	QF	10–5
2008–09	1	Liga ACB	7th	16–18	Quarterfinalist			2 Eurocup	QF	10–3
2009–10	1	Liga ACB	5th	23–13	Semifinalist			2 Eurocup	C	14–2
2010–11	1	Liga ACB	5th	24–12	Semifinalist	Supercopa	RU	1 Euroleague	QF	10–11
2011–12	1	Liga ACB	4th	23–18				2 Eurocup	RU	12–4
2012–13	1	Liga ACB	6th	23–14	Runner-up	Supercopa	SF	2 Eurocup	SF	11–5
2013–14	1	Liga ACB	3rd	34–8	Semifinalist			2 Eurocup	C	15–9
2014–15	1	Liga ACB	4th	23–18	Quarterfinalist	Supercopa	SF	1 Euroleague	RS	3–7
2014–15	1	Liga ACB	4th	23–18	Quarterfinalist	Supercopa	SF	2 Eurocup	QF	5–5
2015–16	1	Liga ACB	3rd	31–9	Quarterfinalist			2 Eurocup	L32	13–3
2016–17	1	Liga ACB	1st	31–12	Runner-up			2 EuroCup	RU	18–5
2017–18	1	Liga ACB	5th	23–14	Quarterfinalist	Supercopa	C	1 EuroLeague	9th	12–18
2018–19	1	Liga ACB	3rd	25–15	Quarterfinalist			2 EuroCup	C	20–3
2019–20	1	Liga ACB	3rd	16–13	Semifinalist	Supercopa	SF	1 EuroLeague	—	12–16
2020–21	1	Liga ACB	4th	27–15	Quarterfinalist			1 EuroLeague	9th	19–15
2021–22	1	Liga ACB	5th	24–13	Quarterfinalist	Supercopa	SF	2 EuroCup	SF	14–7
2022–23	1	Liga ACB	8th	17–19	Quarterfinalist			1 EuroLeague	9th	15–19
2023–24	1	Liga ACB	5th	22–15	Semifinalist			1 EuroLeague	13th	14–20
2024–25	1	Liga ACB	2nd	30–12	Quarterfinalist			2 EuroCup	SF	18–4
2025–26	1	Liga ACB	1st	33–10	Semifinalist	Supercopa	C	1 EuroLeague	SF	28–16
2026–27	1	Liga ACB				Supercopa	SF	1 EuroLeague		

== Honours and other achievements ==
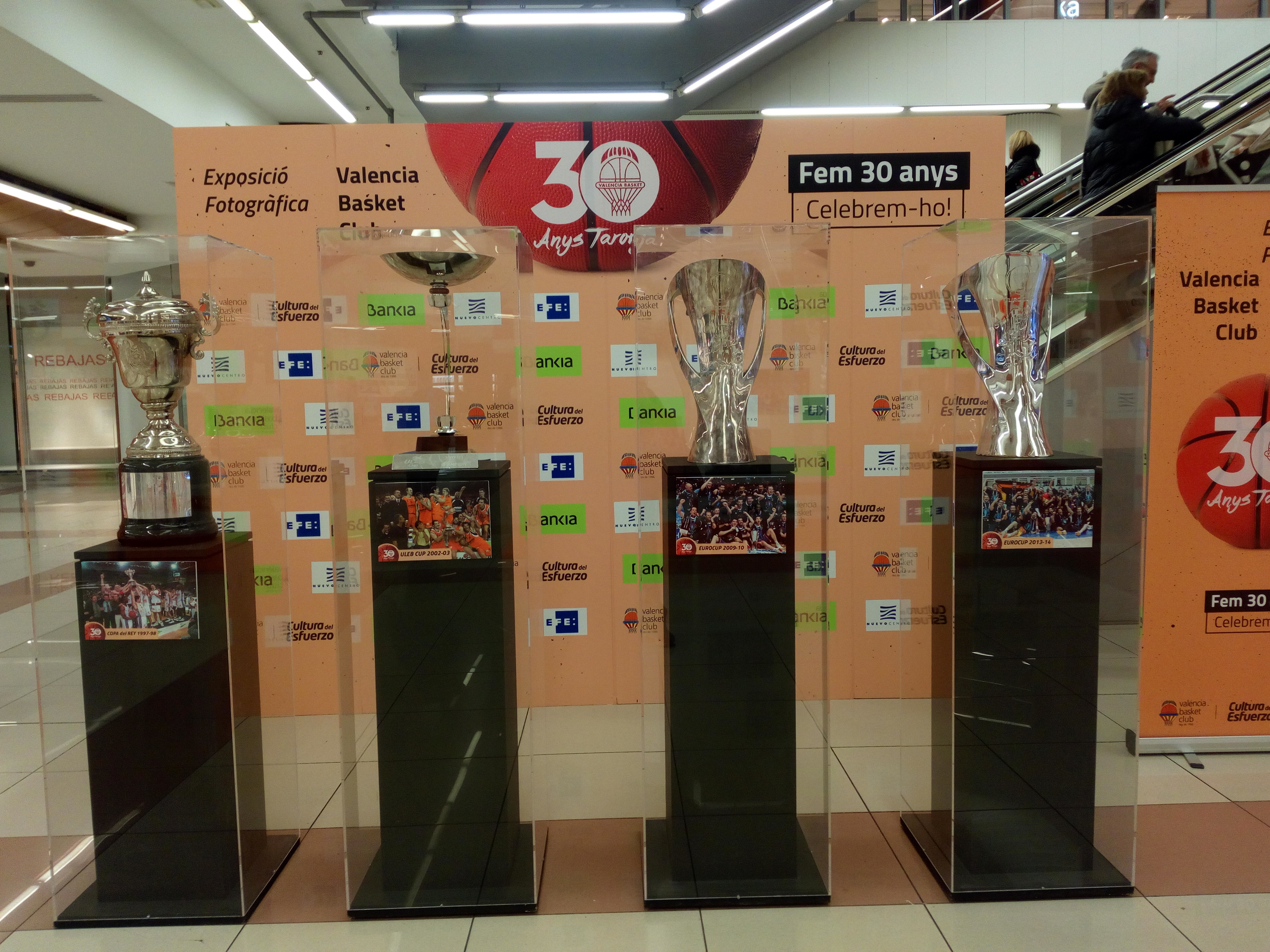
The Copa del Rey and the three EuroCups conquered by the club.

Honours
Type	Competition	Titles	Seasons
International	EuroCup	4	2002–03, 2009–10, 2013–14, 2018–19
Domestic	Spanish League	2	2016–17, 2025–26
Domestic	Spanish Cup	1	1998
Domestic	Spanish Supercup	2	2017, 2025

- Record title holders

=== Other achievements ===
==== International competitions ====
- EuroLeague
  - Final Four (1): 2026
- EuroCup
  - Runners-up (2): 2011–12, 2016–17
- FIBA Saporta Cup
  - Runners-up (2): 1998–99, 2001–02

===== Domestic competitions =====
- Spanish League
  - Runners-up (2): 2002–03, 2024–25
- Spanish Cup
  - Runners-up (4): 2000, 2006, 2013, 2017
- Spanish Supercup
  - Runners-up (1): 2010

==== Friendly trophies ====
- Torneo de Lleida Stagepro: (1)

2009

- Valencia, Spain Invitational Game: (1)

2009

- Trofeo Costa de Sol: (1)

2014

- Trofeo Feria de Albacete: (1)

2019

- Castello, Spain Invitational Game: (1)

2019

- Salou, Spain Invitational Game: (1)

2020

=== Individual awards ===
ACB Most Valuable Player

- Justin Doellman – 2014

ACB Finals MVP

- Bojan Dubljević – 2017

Spanish Cup MVP

- Nacho Rodilla – 1998

Spanish Supercup MVP

- Erick Green – 2017
- Sergio de Larrea – 2025

All-ACB First Team

- Justin Doellman – 2014
- Romain Sato – 2014
- Pau Ribas – 2015
- Justin Hamilton – 2016
- Bojan Dubljević – 2017, 2019
- Jean Montero – 2025, 2026

All-ACB Second Team

- Bojan Dubljević – 2018
- Alberto Abalde – 2020

ACB Slam Dunk Champion

- Víctor Claver – 2007

EuroCup Finals MVP

- Dejan Tomašević – 2003
- Matt Nielsen – 2010
- Justin Doellman – 2014
- Will Thomas - 2019

EuroLeague Rising Star

- Jean Montero – 2026

EuroCup Rising Star

- Víctor Claver – 2010
- Bojan Dubljević – 2013, 2014
- Jean Montero – 2025

EuroCup Coach of the Year

- Pedro Martínez – 2017, 2025

All-EuroLeague First Team

- Jean Montero – 2026

All-EuroLeague Second Team

- Duško Savanović – 2011

All-EuroCup First Team

- Nando De Colo – 2010
- Matt Nielsen – 2010
- Nik Caner-Medley – 2012
- Justin Doellman – 2013, 2014
- Bojan Dubljević – 2017, 2019
- Jean Montero – 2025

All-EuroCup Second Team

- Matt Nielsen – 2009
- Bojan Dubljević – 2014, 2022
- Fernando San Emeterio – 2017
- Sam Van Rossom – 2019
- Xabier López-Arostegui – 2025
- Semi Ojeleye – 2025

== Notable players ==
Note: Flags indicate national team eligibility at FIBA-sanctioned events. Players may hold other non-FIBA nationalities not displayed.

Criteria

To appear in this section a player must have either:

- Set a club record or won an individual award while at the club
- Played at least one official international match for their national team at any time
- Played at least one official NBA match at any time.

- (Spain) Salva Díez
- (Spain) Víctor Luengo
- (Spain) Nacho Rodilla
- (Spain) Berni Álvarez
- (Spain) Víctor Claver
- (Spain) Rafa Martinez
- (Spain) Pau Ribas
- (Spain) Guillem Vives
- (Spain) Fernando San Emeterio
- (Spain) Alberto Abalde
- (Spain) Xabier López-Arostegui
- (Spain) Joan Sastre
- (Spain) Pablo Aguilar
- (Albania) Ermal Kuqo
- (Argentina) Alejandro Montecchia
- (Argentina) Federico Kammerichs
- (Argentina) Fabricio Oberto
- (Australia) Matt Nielsen
- (Brazil) Tiago Splitter
- (Brazil) Vítor Faverani
- (Canada) Kyle Alexander
- (Cuba) Jasiel Rivero
- (France) Antoine Rigaudeau
- (France) Florent Piétrus
- (France) Antoine Diot
- (France) Damien Inglis
- (France) Nando de Colo
- (France) Mickaël Gelabale
- (Italy) Alessandro Abbio
- (Belgium) Sam Van Rossom
- (Greece) Dimos Dikoudis
- (Lithuania) Robertas Javtokas
- (Lithuania) Mindaugas Timinskas
- (Montenegro) Bojan Dubljević
- (Senegal) Maurice Ndour
- (Central African Republic) Romain Sato
- (Serbia) Dejan Tomašević
- (Serbia) Igor Rakočević
- (Serbia) Kosta Perović
- (Serbia) Duško Savanović
- (Serbia) Dejan Milojević
- (Serbia) Nikola Kalinić
- (Serbia) Vule Avdalović
- (Serbia) Vladimir Lučić
- (Serbia) Stefan Marković
- (Serbia) Vanja Marinković
- (Slovenia) Klemen Prepelič
- (Slovenia) Mike Tobey
- (Georgia (country)) Tornike Shengelia
- (Ukraine) Viacheslav Kravtsov
- (Ukraine) Serhiy Lishchuk
- (United States) Tanoka Beard
- (United States) Brad Branson
- (United States) Brian Cardinal
- (United States) / (Uganda) Brandon Davies
- (United States) / (Kosovo) Justin Doellman
- (United States) Derrick Alston
- (United States) Erick Green
- (United States) Jared Harper
- (United States) Jordan Loyd
- (United States) / (Nigeria) Semi Ojeleye
- (United States) / (Spain) Johnny Rogers
- (United States) James Webb III
- (United States) Derrick Williams
- (United States) / (Georgia (country)) Shammond Williams

== Women's team ==
The women's team of Valencia Basket was created in 2014 and promoted to Liga Femenina in 2018, winning the final game against Real Club Celta de Vigo in Valencia. This access to the first division and the relegation of CB Estudiantes made Valencia Basket the only club with masculine and feminine representation in the first division in the 2018–2019 season.

In the first season competing on the first division, Valencia Basket achieved a ticket to their first Copa de la Reina de baloncesto, celebrated in Vitoria between 28 February and 3 June. Also, they achieve a spot to participate in the playoffs, losing against Perfumerías Avenida on the semifinals, but achieving the opportunity to play his first European tournament the next season.
