= Nacho Rodilla =

Spanish basketball player

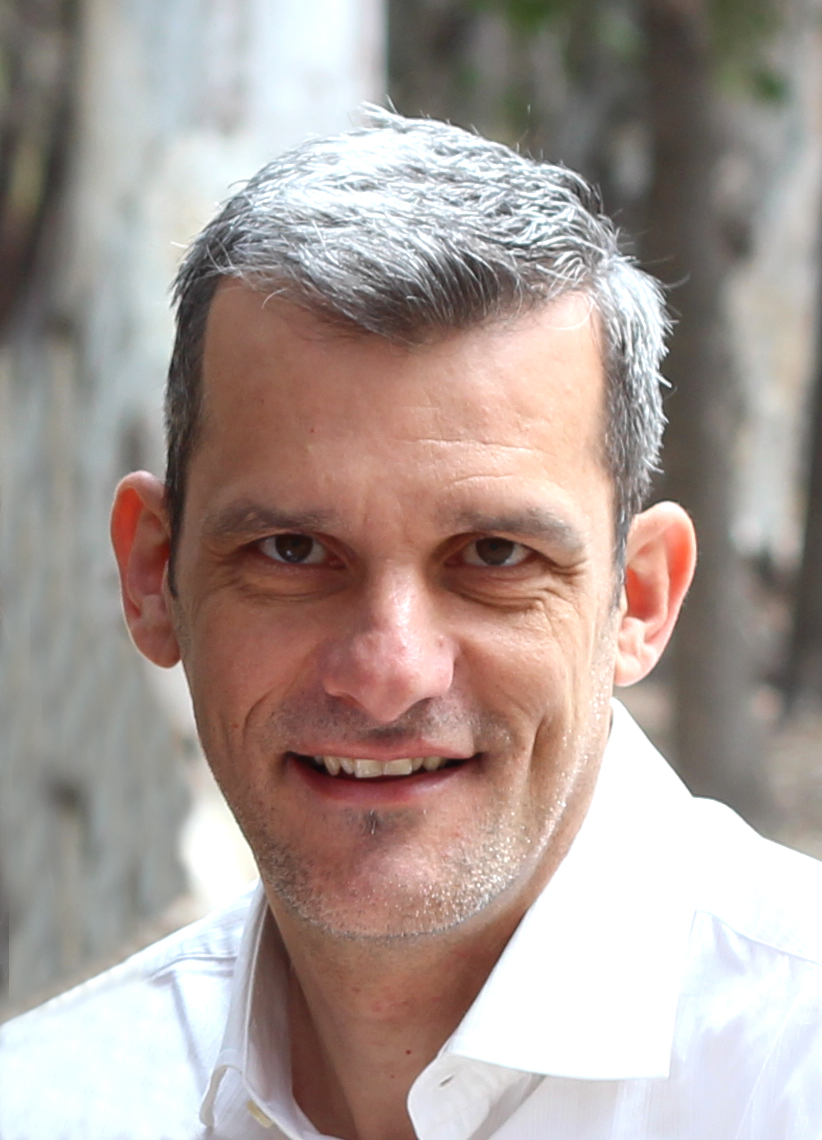

Personal information
- Born: 12 March 1974 (age 52) Llíria, Spain
- Listed height: 192 cm (6 ft 4 in)
- Listed weight: 87 kg (192 lb)

Career information
- Playing career: 1991–2005
- Position: Point guard
- Number: 11

Career history
- 1991–1994: Llíria
- 1994–2003: Valencia Basket
- 2003–2004: Lleida
- 2003–2004: Air Avellino
- 2004–2005: Virtus Bologna

Career highlights
- No. 11 retired by Valencia Basket; ULEB Cup champion (2003); Spanish Cup MVP (1998); Spanish Cup winner (1998); 3x Liga ACB All-Star (1997, 1999, 2001)

José Ignacio "Nacho" Rodilla Gil (born 12 March 1974) is a former Spanish professional basketball player. Standing at 192 cm (6 ft 4 in), Rodilla used to play as point guard. His jersey number 11 was retired by Valencia Basket. Rodilla was also a member of the Spain national basketball team.
