= CB Estudiantes =

Spanish basketball club

Movistar Estudiantes
- Nickname: Estu, Los del Ramiro (The kids from Ramiro), Dementes (Insanes), Madrid Students (NBA form)
- Leagues: Primera FEB; Spain Cup
- Founded: April 1948; 78 years ago
- History: Ramiro de Maeztu (1948); CB Estudiantes (1948–present)
- Arena: Movistar Arena
- Capacity: 17,953
- Location: Madrid, Spain
- Team colors: Light Blue, Navy, Gold
- Main sponsor: Movistar
- President: Jaime González
- Team manager: Íñigo de la Villa
- Head coach: Toni Ten
- Team captain: Omar Silverio and Fernando Zurbriggen
- Ownership: Diego Megía
- Championships: 3 Spanish Cups; 1 Spain Cup; 3 Princess Cups
- Retired numbers: No retired numbers
- Website: www.movistarestudiantes.com
Home	Away

Club Baloncesto Estudiantes, S.A.D. (English: Students Basketball Club), known simply as Estu and as Movistar Estudiantes for sponsorship reasons, is a basketball team based in the city of Madrid, Spain. It is a member of the Asociación de Clubes de Baloncesto (ACB). Founded in 1948, it is one of the most recognized basketball teams in Spain. The team currently competes in the Primera FEB and in the Spain Cup.

Some of its achievements include winning three Spanish Cups and reaching the ACB Finals in 2004. Playing on the courts of Instituto Ramiro de Maeztu, with a large number of teams of all categories from children to juniors, the club's youth academy has produced many players and coaches of Spanish basketball throughout its history, such as Alberto Herreros, Nacho Azofra, Aíto García Reneses, José Miguel Antúnez, Jesús Codina, José Sagi-Vela, Gonzalo Sagi-Vela, Fernando Martín, Alfonso Reyes, Felipe Reyes, Carlos Jiménez, Fran Guerra, Sergio Rodríguez, Iñaki de Miguel, Javier Beirán, Pepu Hernández, Carlos Suárez, Darío Brizuela, Jaime Fernández, Daniel Clark, Jayson Granger, Sebas Saiz or Juancho Hernangómez.

== History ==
The club Estudiantes was founded in April 1948 by a group of students (the "Estudiantes") of a public preparatory school (the Instituto Ramiro de Maeztu, IRM) in Madrid to form a team to practice sport during the school recesses. Mr. Antonio Magariños, Professor of Latin and head of studies of the high school, was the first president of the club. It held the position until 1964. From 1949 it has played in the maximum category of the Spanish basketball.

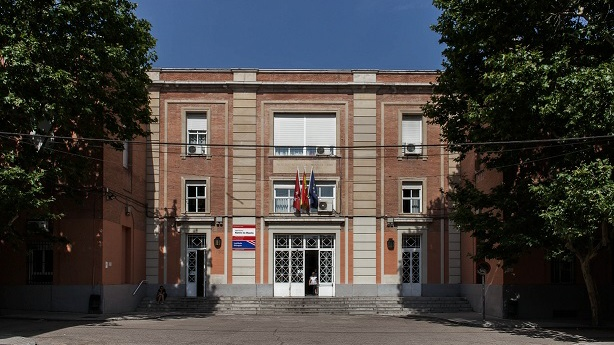
Instituto Ramiro de Maeztu (Madrid), where Estudiantes was born.

By the time when the first Spanish-wide season-long championship was organized in 1955, by the Spanish Basketball Association (FEB), it was one of the six clubs participating in that tournament, as the second best team from the Province of Madrid (the first being Real Madrid). Until 2021, it had always participated in the premier Spanish basketball league along with Real Madrid and Joventut. It was also one of two only Spanish basketball clubs with teams both at the top male and female Spanish championships.

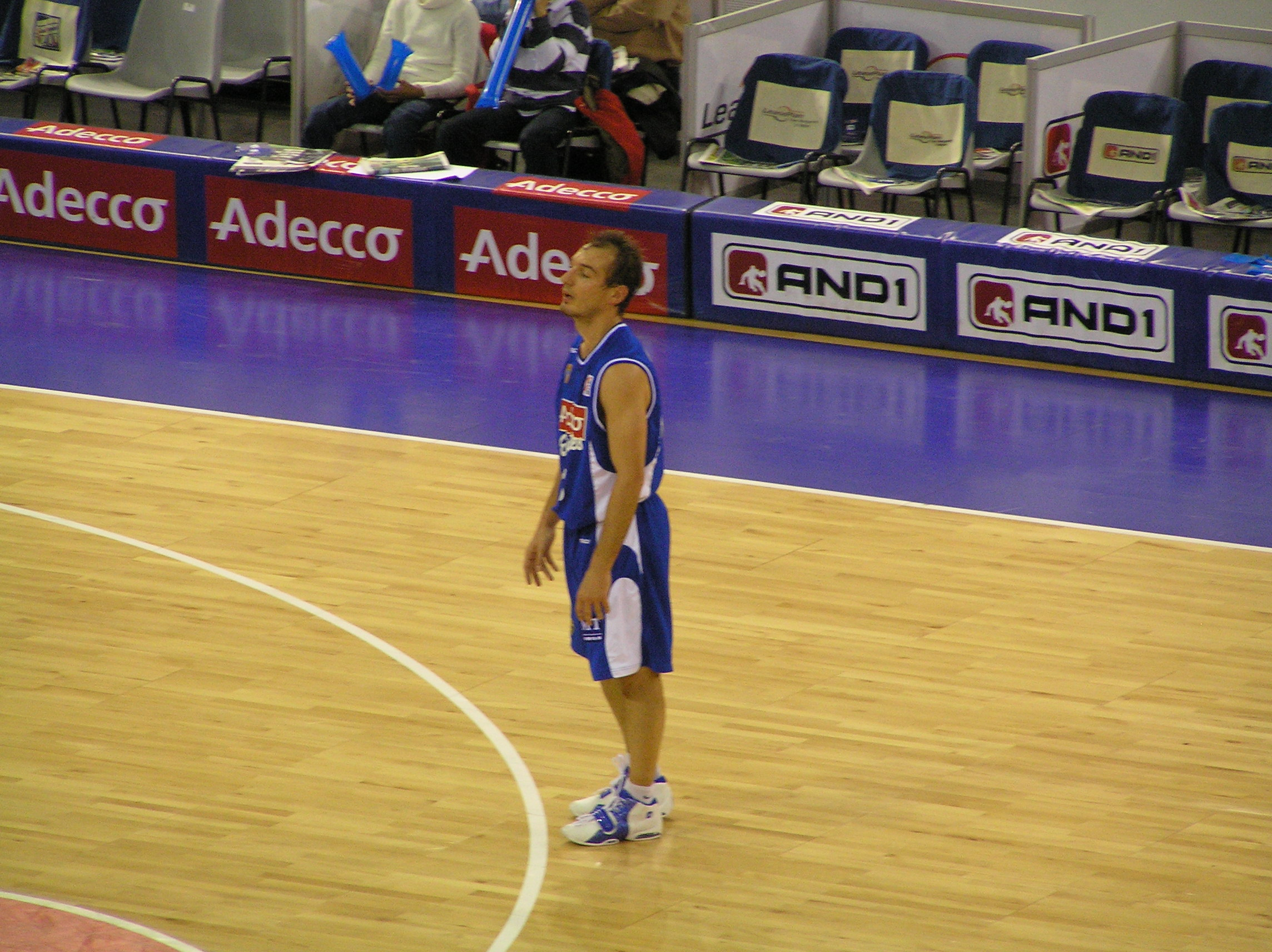
Nacho Azofra is the player with the most appearances in the club's history, and product of youth academy.

In May 1963, Estudiantes won their first trophy, the Spanish Cup, against Real Madrid. In April 1986, after several decades without sporting success, Estudiantes won their first Copa Príncipe de Asturias against Granollers, led by the American forward David Russell. The 1990s and 2000s would be the golden age of the college club. While competing every year in ACB and European competitions, he achieved success and won trophies. In April 1992, a month after winning his second Spanish Cup against CAI Zaragoza, Estudiantes reached the 1992 EuroLeague Final Four in Istanbul, finishing in 4th place. It was his Annus mirabilis. In March 1999, the team played his only European final, in the 1998–99 Korać Cup, by defeated by FC Barcelona. In January 2000, Estu won his third Spanish Cup against Valencia, the last one until today. In the 2003–04 ACB season, it reached the Spanish ACB League finals, where they could not win against FC Barcelona.

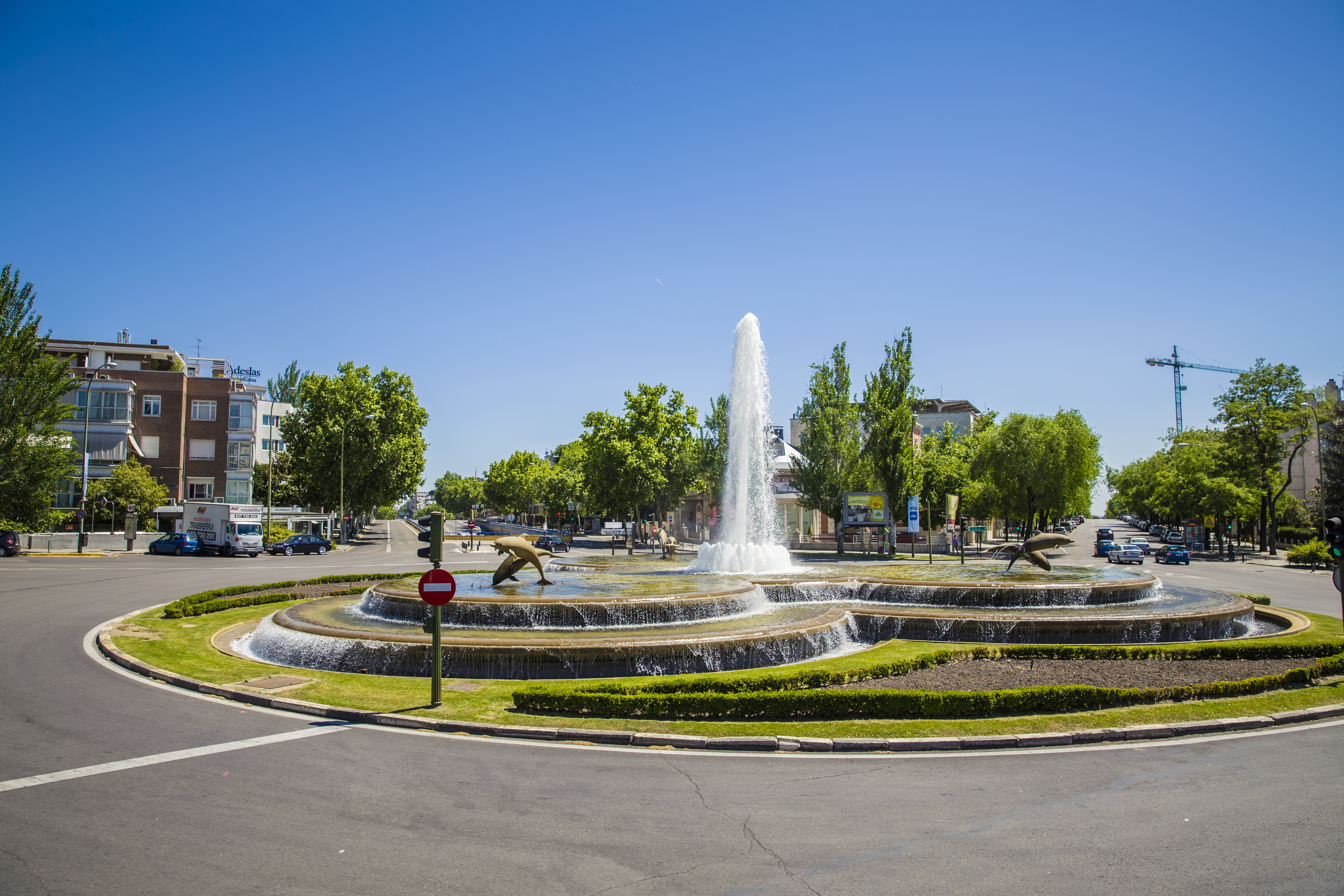
Fountain of Dolphins (Madrid), where the Estudiantes's fans celebrate the team's trophies.

In May 2012, after several irregular seasons, marked by a bad economic situation, Estudiantes was relegated for the first time in its history from the top tier of Spanish basketball, but remained in the league because LEB Oro champion CB 1939 Canarias didn't present the required documentation and money. In May 2016, again, the team was relegated, but remained in the ACB because champion Palencia Baloncesto didn't present the required documentation and money. The club's irregular sporting situation could have been resolved with more efficient management, but finally, after several relatively stable years, the team's relegation was completed during the coronavirus pandemic in May 2021. Since then, Estu remains in LEB Oro, fighting for promotion back to the ACB and gradually resolving its financial situation. Even so, during this negative period, Estudiantes has managed to expand their trophy collection, winning the Copa Princesa de Asturias twice more against Granada (2022) and Básquet Coruña (2024). In January 2026, Estudiantes added to its list of achievements once again, winning the newly created competition, the Spain Cup, against Palencia Baloncesto, the host team of the Final Four.

In September 2026, the CSD gave green light to the purchase of the club by Sexto Hombre S.L., a society led by investment banker Diego Megía.

== Logos ==
Non-commercial logo

Movistar sponsorship logo (2014–present)

== Sponsorship naming ==
Along the years CB Estudiantes has had several sponsorship names:

- No sponsorship name (1948-1971)
- Estudiantes Monteverde (1971–1977)
- No sponsorship name (1977–1978)
- Estudiantes Mudespa (1978–1981)
- Estudiantes Caja Postal (1981–1987), (1989–1992)
- Estudiantes Todagrés (1987–1988)
- Estudiantes Bose (1988–1989)

- Estudiantes Argentaria (1992–1997)
- No sponsorship name (1997–1998)
- Adecco Estudiantes (1998–2006)
- MMT Estudiantes (2006–2009)
- Asefa Estudiantes (2009–2013)
- Tuenti Móvil Estudiantes (2013–2014)
- Movistar Estudiantes (2014–present)

== Home arenas ==
- La Nevera (The IRM Arena): (1948–71)
- Polideportivo Antonio Magariños: (1971–87)
- Palacio Vistalegre: (2001–2005)
- Madrid Arena: (2005–2010)
- Palacio de Deportes de la Comunidad de Madrid: (1987–2001, 2010–present)

== Gallery ==
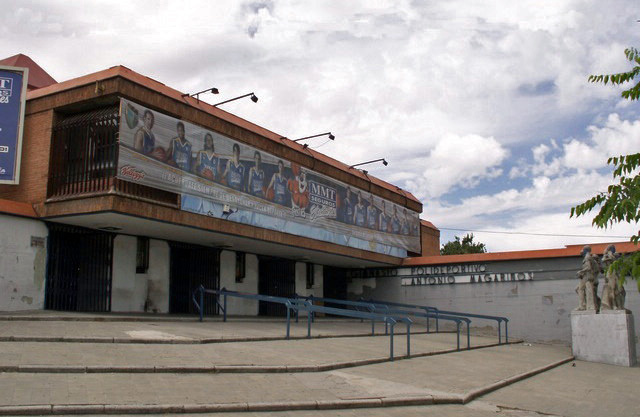
Polideportivo Antonio Magariños, where currently play the women's and the youth teams of the club.

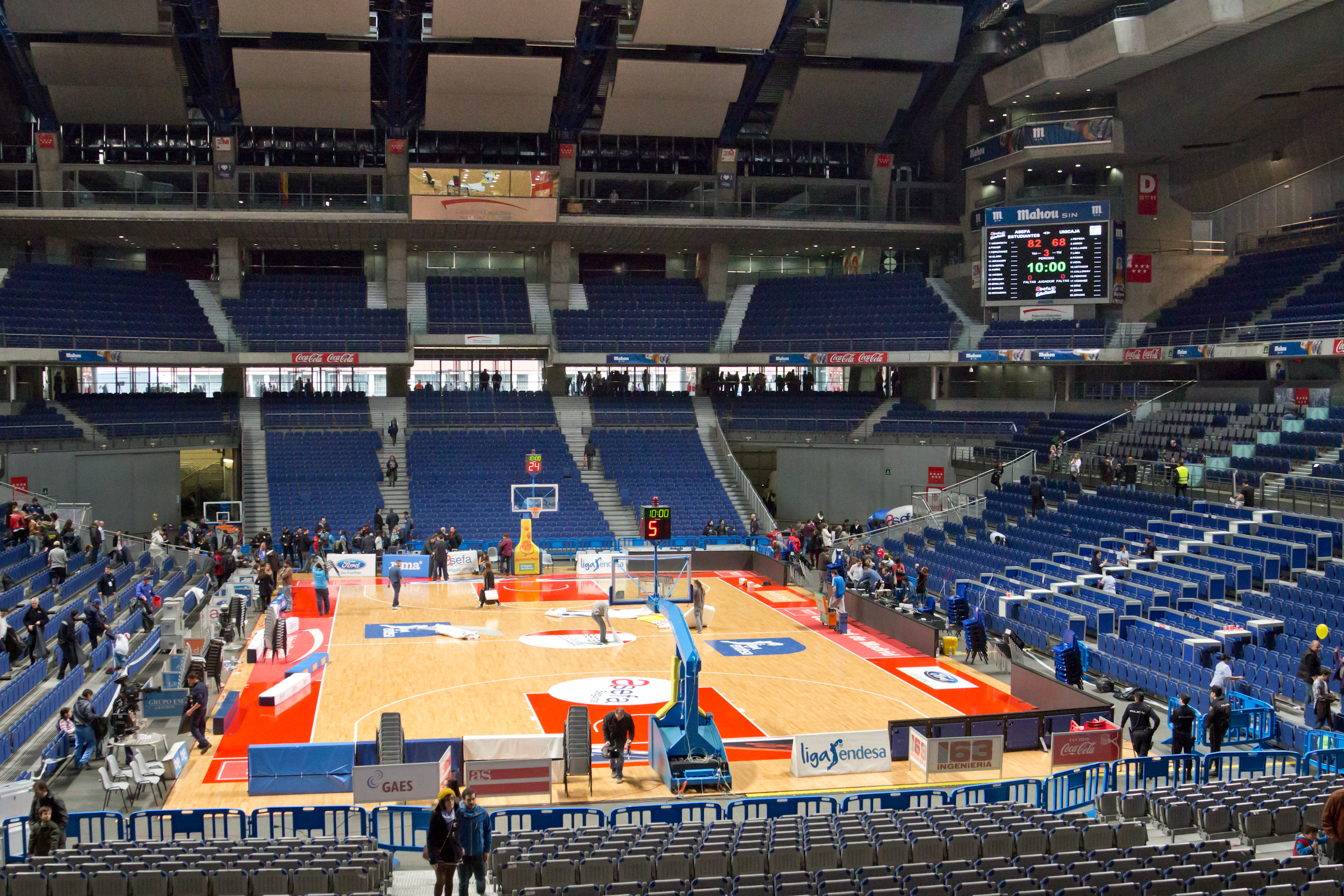
Internal view of Movistar Arena, the current home arena of the club since 2010.

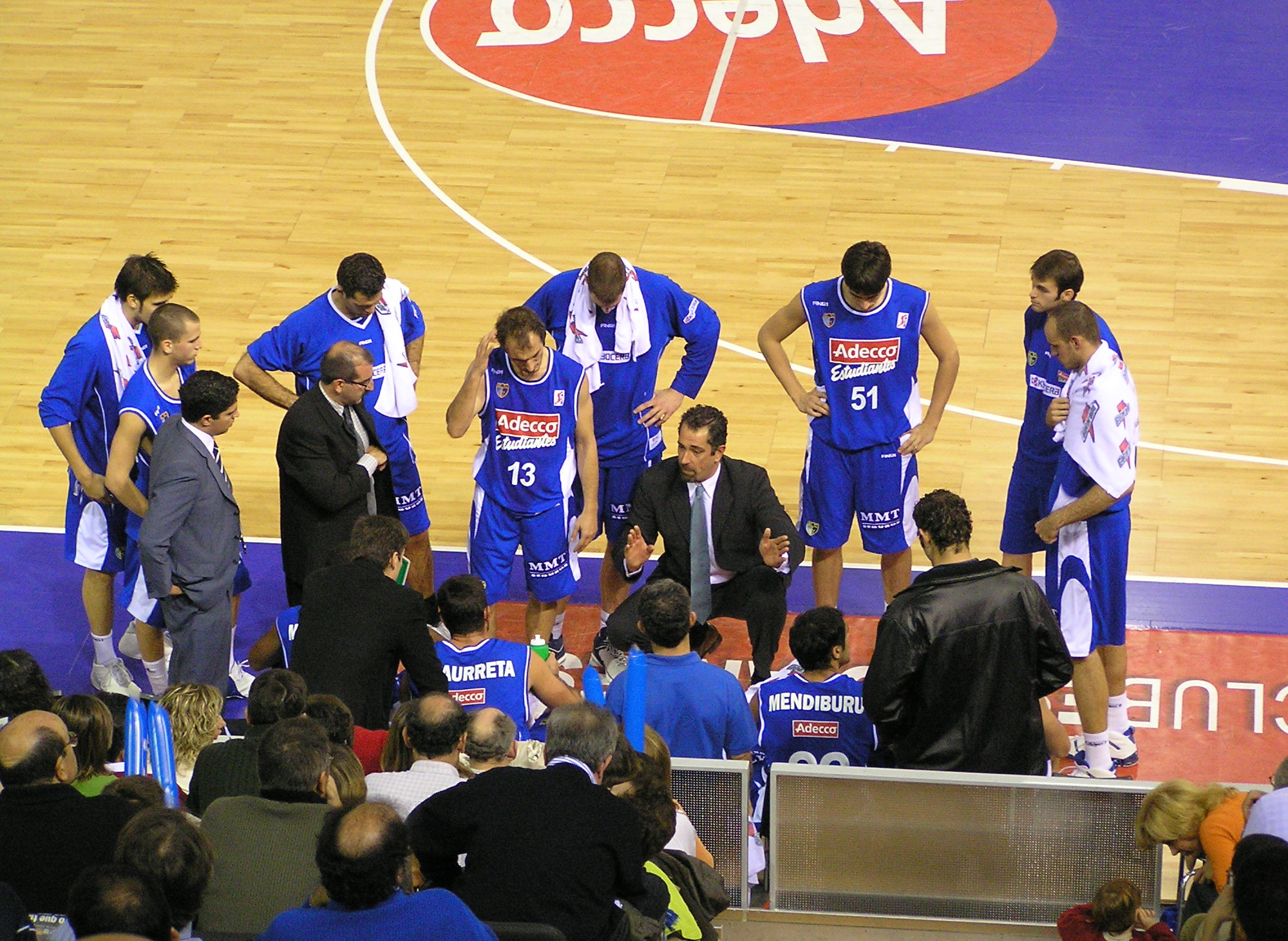
Estudiantes time out during a game versus Valencia Basket in November 2005.

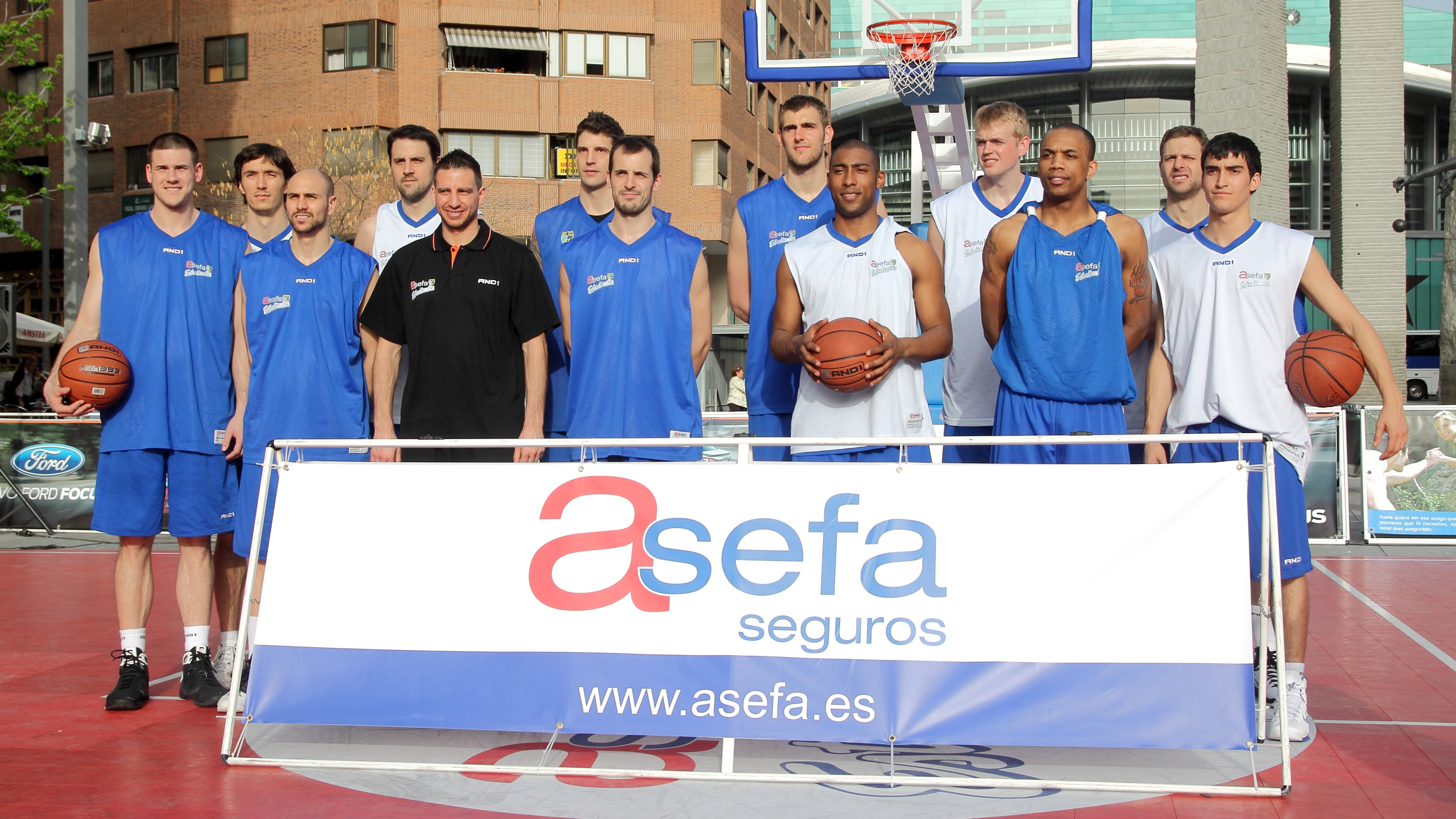
2010–11 season players (from left to right): Nik Caner-Medley, Jiří Welsch, Albert Oliver, Germán Gabriel, Sergio Sánchez, Josh Asselin, Marc Blanch, Yannick Driesen, Jayson Granger, Daniel Clark, Tyrone Ellis, Pancho Jasen, Jaime Fernández.

== Rivalries ==
Estudiantes has a rivalry with Real Madrid. Both teams meet in the Madrid basketball derby (Spanish: Derbi madrileño). Since 2011, both teams currently share their home arena, the Palacio de Deportes de la Comunidad de Madrid. Until 2021, Estudiantes and Real Madrid, along with Joventut, were the only teams that had played all the seasons in the top tier. However, Estudiantes was relegated to LEB Oro after finishing 18th in the 2020–21 ACB season.

== Players ==
=== Basketball Hall of Famers ===
- Antonio Díaz-Miguel, 1950–1952, 1953–1958, inducted 1997
- Fernando Martín, 1979–1981, inducted 2007

=== Current roster ===
Note: Flags indicate national team eligibility at FIBA-sanctioned events. Players may hold other non-FIBA nationalities not displayed.

CB Estudiantes roster
Players
Coaches

Pos.	No.	Nat.	Name	Ht.	Age
SF	2	(The Bahamas) (United States)	Munnings, Travis	1.98 m (6 ft 6 in)	32 – 14 September 1994
PG	3	(United States) (Spain)	Speight, Micah	1.78 m (5 ft 10 in)	28 – 26 June 1998
SF	6	(Argentina) (Italy)	Giovanetti, Lucas	2.01 m (6 ft 7 in)	21 – 14 June 2005
C	7	(Senegal) (Spain)	Niang, Mamadou	2.09 m (6 ft 10 in)	32 – 1 January 1994
PG	9	(France)	Westermann, Léo	1.98 m (6 ft 6 in)	34 – 26 July 1992
PG	10	(Argentina) (Italy)	Zurbriggen, Fernando (C)	1.88 m (6 ft 2 in)	29 – 20 October 1997
SG	11	(United States)	Walker, Jordan	1.83 m (6 ft 0 in)	29 – 19 October 1997
PF	13	(Estonia) (Italy)	Treier, Kaspar	2.04 m (6 ft 8 in)	27 – 19 September 1999
C	15	(Spain)	Aurrecoechea, Iván	2.04 m (6 ft 8 in)	31 – 19 November 1995
SF	16	(Spain)	Jiménez, Millán	1.99 m (6 ft 6 in)	24 – 16 September 2002
PF	17	(Croatia)	Tišma, Boris	2.04 m (6 ft 8 in)	24 – 20 February 2002
C	20	(United States)	Floyd, Jehyve	2.03 m (6 ft 8 in)	29 – 27 June 1997
PF	22	(Argentina) (Poland)	Vaulet, Juan Pablo	2.03 m (6 ft 8 in)	30 – 22 March 1996
PG	33	(Spain)	Sola, Miguel (Y)	1.93 m (6 ft 4 in)	20 – 30 October 2006
SG	51	(Dominican Republic)	Silverio, Omar (C)	1.92 m (6 ft 4 in)	28 – 5 November 1998

Head coach

- (Spain) Toni Ten

Assistant coach(es)

- (Spain) Sergio Jiménez
- (Spain) Manuel Gil
- (United Kingdom) Jack Burgess

Athletic trainer(s)

- (Spain) León Lansac
- (Spain) Nicolás Martínez

Physiotherapist(s)

- (Spain) Óscar Otín
- (Spain) José Alberto Espinosa

Team manager

- (Spain) Adolfo González

Legend

- (C) Team captain
- (Y) Youth player
- Injured

- Roster
Updated: October 12, 2026

=== Depth chart ===
Pos.	Starting 5	Bench 1	Bench 2	Bench 3
C	Jehyve Floyd	Mamadou Niang	Iván Aurrecoechea
PF	Juan Pablo Vaulet	Boris Tišma	Kaspar Treier
SF	Travis Munnings	Millán Jiménez	Lucas Giovannetti
SG	Omar Silverio	Jordan Walker
PG	Léo Westermann	Micah Speight	Fernando Zurbriggen	Miguel Sola

Notes: Blue † – homegrown player; (Note: A homegrown player is a player that played for at least three years before the age of 20 on a Spanish team. In Liga ACB, the team must register at least four homegrown players in rosters of 10–12 players or at least three homegrown players in rosters of 8–9 players.) Red * – overseas player; (Note: An overseas player is a player from outside EEA, FIBA Europe or ACP states. In Liga ACB, the team may register at most two overseas players.) Green ‡ – youth player (Note: In Liga ACB, the team may register under-22 players linked to the youth system.)

=== Notable players ===
- (Spain) José Miguel Antúnez
- (Spain) Víctor Arteaga
- (Spain) Nacho Azofra
- (Spain) Javier Beirán
- (Spain) Darío Brizuela
- (Spain) Jesús Codina
- (Spain) (Andorra) Quino Colom
- (Spain) Rodrigo de la Fuente
- (Spain) Iñaki de Miguel
- (Spain) Antonio Díaz-Miguel
- (Spain) Miguel Estrada
- (Spain) Jaime Fernández
- (Spain) (Venezuela) Germán Gabriel
- (Spain) Aíto García Reneses
- (Spain) Fran Guerra
- (Spain) Juancho Hernangómez
- (Spain) Alberto Herreros
- (Spain) Iker Iturbe
- (Spain) Carlos Jiménez
- (Spain) Oriol Junyent
- (Spain) Antonio Martín
- (Spain) Fernando Martín
- (Spain) (Israel) (Germany) Jan Martín
- (Spain) Nacho Martín
- (Spain) Juan Antonio Martínez
- (Spain) Javier Mendiburu
- (Spain) Albert Oliver
- (Spain) Juan Antonio Orenga
- (Spain) Xavi Rabaseda
- (Spain) Vicente Ramos
- (Spain) Xavi Rey
- (Spain) Alfonso Reyes
- (Spain) Felipe Reyes
- (Spain) Sergio Rodríguez
- (Spain) Guille Rubio
- (Spain) Gonzalo Sagi-Vela
- (Spain) José Sagi-Vela
- (Spain) Javi Salgado
- (Spain) Carlos Suárez
- (Spain) Rafael Vecina
- (Spain) Édgar Vicedo
- (Argentina) (Italy) Patricio Garino
- (Argentina) (Italy) Hernán Jasen
- (Argentina) (Italy) Nicolás Laprovíttola
- (Argentina) (Spain) Federico Van Lacke
- (Austria) (Israel) (United States) Sylven Landesberg
- (Azerbaijan) (United States) Nik Caner-Medley
- (Belgium) Yannick Driesen
- (Bosnia and Herzegovina) (United States) John Roberson
- (Brazil) Lucas Nogueira
- (Brazil) Caio Torres
- (Bulgaria) Dejan Ivanov
- (Canada) Carl English
- (Canada) (Republic of Ireland) Levon Kendall
- (Canada) (United Kingdom) Philip Scrubb
- (Chile) Nacho Arroyo
- (Colombia) (Spain) Hansel Atencia
- (Colombia) (Spain) Juan Palacios
- (Republic of the Congo) Junior Etou
- (Croatia) Marko Banić
- (Croatia) Danko Cvjetičanin
- (Croatia) Željko Šakić
- (Croatia) (United States) Goran Suton
- (Czech Republic) Ondřej Balvín
- (Czech Republic) Jiří Welsch
- (Denmark) Kevin Larsen
- (Dominican Republic) (United States) Josh Asselin
- (Dominican Republic) Ángel Delgado
- (Dominican Republic) (United States) Luis Flores
- (Finland) (United States) Alex Murphy
- (Finland) Sasu Salin
- (Finland) (United States) Jamar Wilson
- (France) (United States) Tariq Kirksay
- (France) Edwin Jackson
- (France) Michel Morandais
- (France) Florent Piétrus
- (France) Ali Traoré
- (Georgia (country)) (United States) Tyrone Ellis
- (Georgia (country)) Viktor Sanikidze
- (Greece) Fotios Lampropoulos
- (Italy) Pietro Aradori
- (Italy) Alessandro Gentile
- (Latvia) Mārtiņš Laksa
- (Latvia) Toms Leimanis
- (Lithuania) Dovydas Giedraitis
- (North Macedonia) (United States) Shayne Whittington
- (Montenegro) (United States) Omar Cook
- (Montenegro) Nemanja Đurišić
- (Montenegro) Goran Nikolić
- (Netherlands) (France) Nicolas de Jong
- (Norway) Torgeir Bryn
- (Norway) Karamo Jawara
- (Panama) (Spain) Rubén Garcés
- (Puerto Rico) J. J. Barea
- (Puerto Rico) Gian Clavell
- (Russia) Mikhail Mikhailov
- (Senegal) (Spain) Sitapha Savané
- (Serbia) Aleksa Avramović
- (Serbia) Stefan Birčević
- (Serbia) Aleksandar Cvetković
- (Serbia) Nemanja Dangubić
- (Serbia) (Spain) Nikola Lončar
- (Serbia) Petar Popović
- (Serbia) Vladimir Štimac
- (Slovenia) Domen Lorbek
- (Slovenia) Uroš Slokar
- (Slovenia) Samo Udrih
- (Slovakia) Martin Rančík
- (Sweden) Ludvig Håkanson
- (United Kingdom) Daniel Clark
- (Ukraine) Vitaly Potapenko
- (Uruguay) (Italy) Jayson Granger
- (Venezuela) Michael Carrera
- (United States) Gary Alexander
- (United States) Corey Brewer
- (United States) Alec Brown
- (United States) Louis Bullock
- (United States) Vonteego Cummings
- (United States) Johnny Dee
- (United States) Toney Douglas
- (United States) (Belize) Marlon Garnett
- (United States) Keith Jennings
- (United States) Adam Keefe
- (United States) (Slovakia) Kyle Kuric
- (United States) Chris Lofton
- (United States) Will McDonald
- (United States) Tony Mitchell
- (United States) Andrae Patterson
- (United States) John Pinone
- (United States) Phil Pressey
- (United States) David Russell
- (United States) Walker Russell
- (United States) (Bulgaria) Cedric Simmons
- (United States) Terry Stotts
- (United States) Ron Taylor
- (United States) Shaun Vandiver
- (United States) Glen Whisby
- (United States) Eric White
- (United States) Harper Williams
- (United States) Rickie Winslow
- (United States) Antoine Wright

== Head coach ==
- (Spain) Rafael Laborde: 1948–1949, 1953–1955, 1956
- (Spain) Miguel Parrilla: 1949–1951
- (Spain) Leopoldo Bermúdez: 1951–1953
- (Spain) Víctor Díaz: 1955–1956
- (Spain) Héctor Rodríguez: 1956 (int.)
- (Spain) José Antonio Garrido: 1956–1957
- (Spain) Roberto Bermúdez: 1957, 1959–1960, 1974–1975
- (Spain) Emilio Tejada: 1957–1958
- (Spain) Ramón Uturbi: 1958–1959
- (Spain) Jaime Bolea: 1960–1963
- (Spain) Jesús Codina: 1963–1964, 1973–1974, 1979–1981
- (Spain) Francisco Hernández: 1964–1965
- (Spain) Ignacio Pinedo: 1965–1973
- (Spain) Fernando Bermúdez: 1975–1976
- (Spain) José Ramón Ramos: 1976–1979
- (Spain) Fernando Martínez Arroyo: 1979
- (Spain) Antonio Gómez Carra: 1981–1983
- (Spain) Paco Garrido: 1983–1988
- (Spain) Miguel Ángel Martín: 1988–1994
- (Spain) Pepu Hernández: 1994–2001, 2001–2005, 2011–2012
- (Spain) Charly Sáinz de Aja: 2001
- (Spain) Juan Antonio Orenga: 2005–2006
- (Spain) Pedro Martínez: 2006–2007
- (Spain) Mariano de Pablos: 2007
- (France) (Spain) Javier Carlos González: 2007 (int.)
- (Croatia) Velimir Perasović: 2007–2008
- (Spain) Luis Casimiro: 2008–2011
- (Spain) Trifón Poch: 2012
- (Spain) Txus Vidorreta: 2012–2015
- (Spain) Diego Ocampo: 2015–2016
- (Spain) Alberto Lorenzo: 2016 (int.), 2023
- (Spain) Sergio Valdeolmillos: 2016
- (Spain) Salva Maldonado: 2016–2018
- (Spain) Josep Maria Berrocal: 2018–2019
- (Serbia) Aleksandar Džikić: 2019–2020
- (Spain) Javier Zamora: 2020–2021
- (Spain) Jota Cuspinera: 2021–2022
- (Spain) Diego Epifanio: 2022
- (Spain) Javi Rodríguez: 2022–2023
- (Spain) Pedro Rivero: 2023–2025
- (Spain) Natxo Lezkano: 2025
- (Spain) Toni Ten: 2025–present

== Presidents ==
- Antonio Magariños: 1948–1964
- Anselmo López: 1964 (int.)
- José Hermida: 1964–1971
- Pedro Dellmans: 1971–1983
- Juan Francisco Moneo: 1983–1998
- Alejandro González Varona: 1998–2004
- Juan Francisco García: 2004–2005, 2008–2014
- Fernando Bermúdez: 2005–2008
- Javier Tejedor: 2008
- Fernando Galindo: 2014–2022
- Ignacio Triana: 2022–2026
- Jaime González: 2026–present

== Season by season ==
Season	Tier	Division	Pos.	W–L	Copa del Rey	Other cups		European competitions		
1957	1	1ª División	5th	3–7						
1958	1	1ª División	5th	11–1–6						
1958–59	1	1ª División	6th	12–2–8	Quarterfinalist					
1959–60	1	1ª División	10th	6–2–14	Round of 16					
1960–61	1	1ª División	7th	10–2–10	First round					
1961–62	1	1ª División	3rd	10–8	Runner-up					
1962–63	1	1ª División	2nd	11–5	Champion					
1963–64	1	1ª División	5th	13–9	Semifinalist					
1964–65	1	1ª División	4th	6–8						
1965–66	1	1ª División	6th	8–10	Semifinalist					
1966–67	1	1ª División	3rd	14–6	Semifinalist					
1967–68	1	1ª División	2nd	16–4	Semifinalist					
1968–69	1	1ª División	5th	12–10	Quarterfinalist					
1969–70	1	1ª División	5th	11–1–10	Quarterfinalist					
1970–71	1	1ª División	8th	8–14	Round of 16					
1971–72	1	1ª División	5th	12–10	Semifinalist					
1972–73	1	1ª División	4th	17–1–12	Runner-up					
1973–74	1	1ª División	4th	17–2–9	Semifinalist			2 Cup Winners' Cup	SF	5–4
1974–75	1	1ª División	7th	8–14	Runner-up					
1975–76	1	1ª División	4th	17–15	Semifinalist			2 Cup Winners' Cup	SF	6–1
1976–77	1	1ª División	6th	10–12	Semifinalist					
1977–78	1	1ª División	7th	8–1–13	Semifinalist					
1978–79	1	1ª División	4th	13–1–8	Quarterfinalist					
1979–80	1	1ª División	8th	9–1–12	Round of 16					
1980–81	1	1ª División	2nd	18–2–6	Quarterfinalist					
1981–82	1	1ª División	11th	10–1–15	Round of 16					
1982–83	1	1ª División	10th	8–1–17	Round of 16					
1983–84	1	Liga ACB	13th	14–16						
1984–85	1	Liga ACB	7th	20–13		Copa Asociación	SF			
1985–86	1	Liga ACB	5th	17–15		Copa Príncipe	C			
1986–87	1	Liga ACB	5th	16–17	Quarterfinalist	Copa Príncipe	R16	3 Korać Cup	QF	5–3
1987–88	1	Liga ACB	5th	18–14	Quarterfinalist	Copa Príncipe	QF	3 Korać Cup	QF	3–5
1988–89	1	Liga ACB	10th	20–19	Quarterfinalist			3 Korać Cup	QF	4–6
1989–90	1	Liga ACB	4th	22–19	Round of 16					
1990–91	1	Liga ACB	3rd	30–12	Runner-up			3 Korać Cup	QF	8–4
1991–92	1	Liga ACB	3rd	30–13	Champion			1 European League	4th	14–7
1992–93	1	Liga ACB	4th	27–14	Quarterfinalist			1 European League	GS	6–10
1993–94	1	Liga ACB	4th	22–16	Fourth position			3 Korać Cup	GS	4–4
1994–95	1	Liga ACB	7th	20–20	Third position			3 Korać Cup	GS	5–5
1995–96	1	Liga ACB	3rd	29–16				3 Korać Cup	GS	6–4
1996–97	1	Liga ACB	3rd	25–17	Quarterfinalist			1 EuroLeague	R16	9–7
1997–98	1	Liga ACB	5th	25–13	Quarterfinalist			1 EuroLeague	R16	8–10
1998–99	1	Liga ACB	4th	24–17				3 Korać Cup	RU	14–2
1999–00	1	Liga ACB	3rd	28–14	Champion			3 Korać Cup	SF	11–3
2000–01	1	Liga ACB	6th	22–16	Quarterfinalist			1 Euroleague	R16	4–8
2001–02	1	Liga ACB	4th	23–19	Semifinalist			2 Saporta Cup	R16	6–6
2002–03	1	Liga ACB	4th	27–14	Quarterfinalist			2 ULEB Cup	SF	11–5
2003–04	1	Liga ACB	2nd	28–20	Quarterfinalist			2 ULEB Cup	SF	11–5
2004–05	1	Liga ACB	4th	25–17	Quarterfinalist			1 Euroleague	RS	4–10
2005–06	1	Liga ACB	8th	17–20				2 ULEB Cup	RS	4–6
2006–07	1	Liga ACB	9th	16–18				3 FIBA EuroCup	4th	12–4
2007–08	1	Liga ACB	14th	12–22						
2008–09	1	Liga ACB	13th	12–22	Semifinalist					
2009–10	1	Liga ACB	7th	19–17	Quarterfinalist					
2010–11	1	Liga ACB	12th	16–18				2 Eurocup	QF	8–6
2011–12	1	Liga ACB	17th (Note: Remained in ACB due to the resign of CB Canarias to promote.)	11–23						
2012–13	1	Liga ACB	12th	15–19	Quarterfinalist					
2013–14	1	Liga ACB	16th	12–22						
2014–15	1	Liga ACB	13th	14–20						
2015–16	1	Liga ACB	17th (Note: Remained in ACB due to the resign of Palencia Baloncesto to promote.)	9–25						
2016–17	1	Liga ACB	11th	13–19						
2017–18	1	Liga ACB	11th	17–17				3 Champions League	RS	9–1–6
2018–19	1	Liga ACB	16th	11–23	Quarterfinalist			3 Champions League	QR2	2–2
2019–20	1	Liga ACB	18th (Note: Season curtailed due to the coronavirus pandemic.)	5–18						
2020–21	1	Liga ACB	18th	9–27						
2021–22	2	LEB Oro	3rd	29–11		Copa Princesa	C			
2022–23	2	LEB Oro	7th	22–15						
2023–24	2	LEB Oro	3rd	29–12		Copa Princesa	C			
2024–25	2	Primera FEB	4th	29–9		Spain Cup	QF			
2025–26	2	Primera FEB	3rd	24–13		Spain Cup	C			

== International record ==
Season	Achievement	Notes
EuroLeague
1991–92	Final Four	4th place in Istanbul, lost to Joventut Badalona 91–69 in the semi-final, lost to Olimpia Milano 99–81 in the 3rd place game
FIBA Saporta Cup
1973–74	Semi-finals	eliminated by Crvena zvezda, 74-79 (L) in Madrid and 104-85 (L) in Belgrade
1975–76	Semi-finals	eliminated by Tours, 106-81 (L) in Tours and 93-72 (W) in Madrid
FIBA Korać Cup
1986–87	Quarter-finals	2nd place in a group with JuveCaserta, Challans and Budućnost
1987–88	Quarter-finals	3rd place in a group with Crvena zvezda, ASVEL and PAOK
1988–89	Quarter-finals	4th place in a group with Partizan, Varese and Mariembourg
1990–91	Quarter-finals	eliminated by Joventut Badalona, 93-79 (L) in Barcelona and 76-63 (W) in Madrid
1998–99	Final	lost to FC Barcelona, 93–77 (W) in Madrid, 97–70 (L) in Barcelona in the double finals of Korać Cup
1999–2000	Semi-finals	eliminated by Málaga, 85-72 (L) in Málaga and 53-47 (W) in Madrid
Eurocup
2002–03	Semi-finals	lost to Valencia, 68-55 (L) in Valencia and 75-68 (W) in Madrid
2003–04	Semi-finals	lost to Real Madrid, 75-83 (L) in Madrid and 82-73 (L) in Madrid
2010–11	Quarter-finals	lost to Cedevita, 90-81 (L) in Zagreb and 72-81 (L) in Madrid
FIBA EuroChallenge
2006–07	Final Four	4th place in Girona, lost to Girona 58–89 in the semi-final, lost to Virtus Bologna 62–80 in the 3rd place game

== Honours ==
=== Domestic competitions ===
- Liga ACB

Runners-up (4): 1962–63, 1967–68, 1980–81, 2003–04

- Copa del Rey de Baloncesto (Spanish King's Cup)

Winners (3): 1963, 1992, 2000
Runners-up (4): 1962, 1973, 1975, 1991

- Spain Cup

Winners (1): 2025–26

- Copa Princesa de Asturias (Spanish Princess' Cup) (defunct)

Winners (3): 1986, 2022, 2024

=== European competitions ===
- EuroLeague

4th place (1): 1991–92
Final Four (1): 1992

- FIBA Saporta Cup (defunct)

Semifinalists (2): 1973–74, 1975–76

- FIBA Korać Cup (defunct)

Runners-up (1): 1998–99

- EuroCup Basketball

Semifinalists (2): 2002–03, 2003–04

- FIBA EuroChallenge (defunct)

4th place (1): 2006–07
Final Four (1): 2007

=== Other competitions ===
- FIBA International Christmas Tournament (defunct)

Winners (1):1992
4th place (4): 1972, 1974, 1975, 1993

- Torneo Comunidad de Madrid (defunct)

Winners (8): 1988, 1990, 1992, 1993, 1996, 1999, 2001, 2002, 2003

- Albacete, Spain Invitational Game

Winners (1): 2014

- Torneo Ciudad de Getafe

Winners (1): 2019

=== Individual awards ===
Spanish Cup MVP

- Juan Antonio Orenga – 1991
- John Pinone – 1992
- Alfonso Reyes – 2000

ACB Rising Star

- Sergio Rodríguez – 2005
- Carlos Suárez – 2006
- Juancho Hernangómez – 2016

ACB Slam Dunk Champion

- David Russell – 1986, 1987
- Rickie Winslow – 1990
- Chandler Thompson – 1996, 1998

ACB Three Point Shootout Champion

- Danko Cvjetičanin – 1993
- Keith Jennings – 1996

All-ACB First Team

- Carlos Jiménez – 2006
- Carlos Suárez – 2010
- Nik Caner-Medley – 2011
- Edwin Jackson – 2017
- Sylven Landesberg – 2018

Spanish Princess' Cup MVP

- David Russell – 1986
- Álex Urtasun – 2022
- Alec Wintering – 2024

Spain Cup MVP

- Lotanna Nwogbo – 2026

== Matches against NBA teams ==
11 October 2007

Boxscore

Memphis Grizzlies (United States)	98–73	(Spain) MMT Estudiantes

(Spain) Palacio de Deportes, Madrid

== Gold and Diamond Badge ==
The Gold and Diamond Badge of Club Estudiantes is the highest honor bestowed by the sports organization. It is characterized as a piece of jewelry that represents the club's shield in gold, adorned with diamonds, symbolizing excellence, commitment and a long association with the entity. It is an exclusive symbol awarded to people who have made an exceptional contribution to its history, values or functioning, including presidents, historical players or important people for their career and institutional or social support. Currently, fifteen people have received the distinction in the club's more than 75-year history:

Presidets of the club

- José Hermida (1964–1971)
- Pedro Dellmans (1971–1983)
- Juan Francisco Moneo (1983–1998)
- Alejandro González Varona (1998–2004)
- Juan Francisco García (2004–2005, 2008–2014)

Institutional

- Francisco González, chairman of Argentaria
- Alberto Toledano, CEO and managing director of Asefa
- César Alierta, CEO and chairman of Telefónica
- Luis Miguel Gilpérez, chairman of Telefónica

Sports

- Juan Antonio Martínez Arroyo, player (1961–1975)
- José Sagi-Vela, player (1963–1969, 1974–1977)
- John Pinone, player (1984–1993)
- Pepu Hernández, head coach (1994–2001, 2001–2005, 2011–2012)

Social

- Manolo Cavido, prop man and team manager
- Petra Guzmán, prop woman, waitress and cleaning woman of the Instituto Ramiro de Maeztu

== Women's team ==
CB Estudiantes has also a women's team which was founded in 1989 and played during several seasons in Liga Femenina, the Spanish women's basketball top tier. It currently plays in Liga Femenina.

=== Current roster ===
Note: Flags indicate national team eligibility at FIBA-sanctioned events. Players may hold other non-FIBA nationalities not displayed.

CB Estudiantes roster
Players
Coaches

Pos.	No.	Nat.	Name	Ht.	Age
SG	4	(United States)	Broughton, Zipporah	1.70 m (5 ft 7 in)	26 – 17 August 2000
PG	5	(Spain)	Latorre, Isa	1.70 m (5 ft 7 in)	30 – 22 March 1996
SG	6	(Spain)	Buch, Rosó	1.76 m (5 ft 9 in)	34 – 24 July 1992
SG	7	(Spain)	Soler, Júlia	1.81 m (5 ft 11 in)	25 – 20 August 2001
PF	8	(Spain)	Etxarri, Irati	1.89 m (6 ft 2 in)	28 – 26 July 1998
C	11	(Spain)	García, Marta	1.89 m (6 ft 2 in)	24 – 16 February 2002
PG	12	(Spain)	Lamana, Laia	1.72 m (5 ft 8 in)	24 – 8 January 2002
SF	15	(Canada) (Haiti)	Féquière, Jessica	1.80 m (5 ft 11 in)	33 – 11 September 1993
SF	16	(Spain)	Osma, Carla	1.82 m (6 ft 0 in)	20 – 14 August 2006
C	21	(United States)	Cooper, Kendall	1.93 m (6 ft 4 in)	31 – 19 August 1995
PF	30	(Spain)	Sánchez, Gisela	1.91 m (6 ft 3 in)	23 – 30 June 2003
SF	78	(Spain)	De Santiago, Begoña	1.83 m (6 ft 0 in)	24 – 23 January 2002

Head coach

- (Spain) Isaac Fernández

Assistant coach(es)

- (Spain) Olmo Gómez
- (Spain) Olga González

Athletic trainer(s)

- (Spain) Álvaro Manzanares

Physiotherapist(s)

- (Spain) Marta González

Team manager

- (Spain) Miguel Herencias

Legend

- (C) Team captain
- Injured

- Roster
Updated: November 19, 2026

=== Season by season ===
Season	Tier	Division	Pos.	Copa de la Reina	European competitions		
2000–01	2	1ª División	2nd (Note: Invited to join the newly created Liga Femenina 2.)				
2001–02	2	Liga Femenina 2	2nd				
2002–03	1	Liga Femenina	10th				
2003–04	1	Liga Femenina	7th				
2004–05	1	Liga Femenina	7th	Quarterfinalist			
2005–06	1	Liga Femenina	8th				
2006–07	1	Liga Femenina	13th				
2007–08	2	Liga Femenina 2	3rd				
2008–09	1	Liga Femenina	12th				
2009–10	1	Liga Femenina	13th				
2010–11	2	Liga Femenina 2	4th				
2011–12	2	Liga Femenina 2	9th				
2012–13	2	Liga Femenina 2	7th				
2013–14	2	Liga Femenina 2	6th				
2014–15	2	Liga Femenina 2	8th				
2015–16	2	Liga Femenina 2	8th				
2016–17	2	Liga Femenina 2	2nd				
2017–18	1	Liga Femenina	14th				
2018–19	2	Liga Femenina 2	10th				
2019–20	2	Liga Femenina 2	1st (Note: Liga Femenina 2 season 19/20 curtailed due to coronavirus)				
2020–21	1	Liga Femenina	5th				
2021–22	1	Liga Femenina	7th	Quarterfinalist	2 EuroCup Women	PR1	4–4
2022–23	1	Liga Femenina	8th	Quarterfinalist	2 EuroCup Women	PR1	3–5
2023–24	1	Liga Femenina	6th	Semifinalist	2 EuroCup Women	PR1	6–2
2024–25	1	Liga Femenina	6th	Quarterfinalist	2 EuroCup Women	R16	6–1–3
2025–26	1	Liga Femenina	11th		2 EuroCup Women	QF	8–4
