= Duško Savanović =

Serbian basketball player

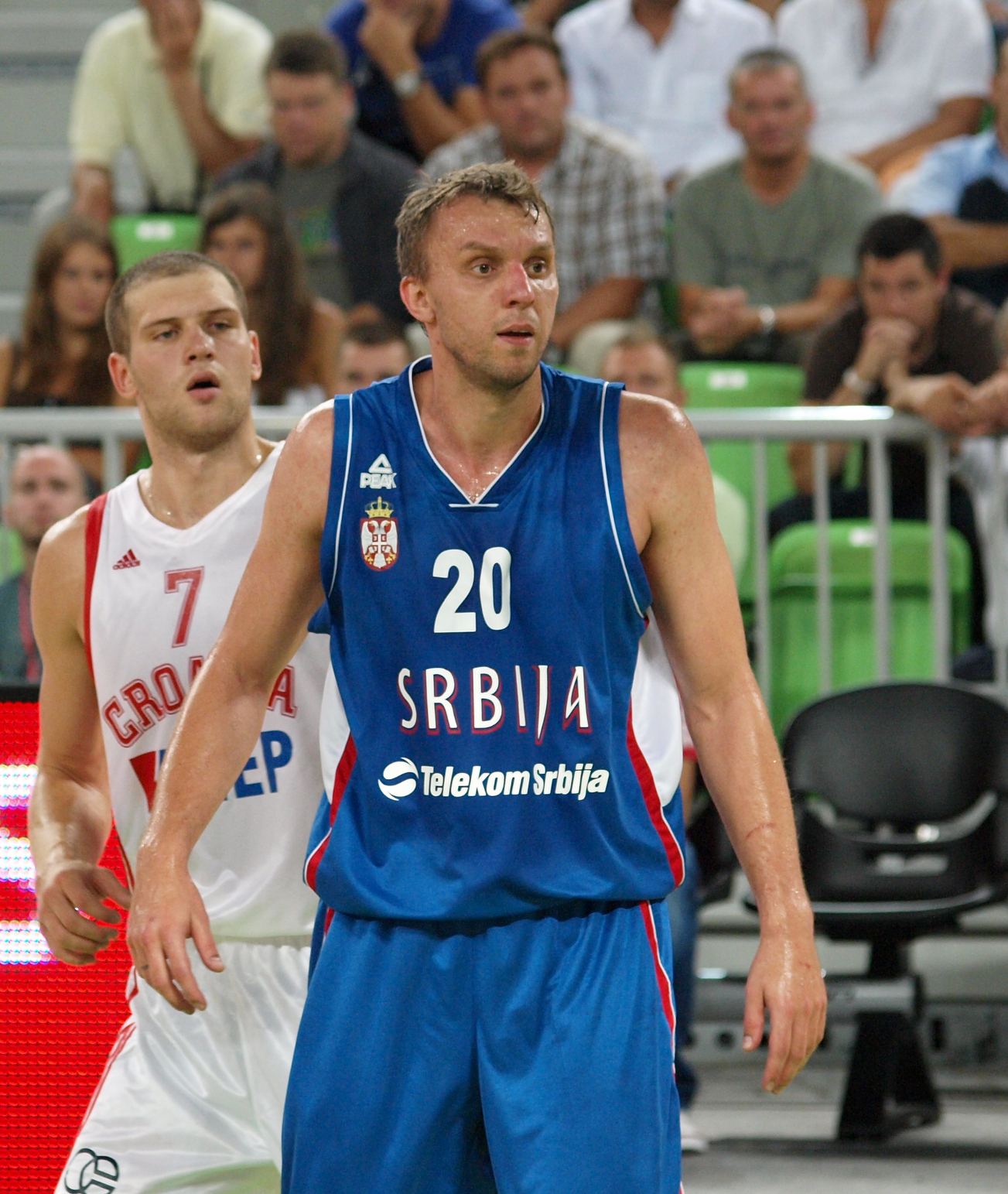
- Savanović with Serbian national team in August 2011.

Personal information
- Born: September 5, 1983 (age 43) Zagreb, SR Croatia, SFR Yugoslavia
- Listed height: 2.04 m (6 ft 8 in)
- Listed weight: 102 kg (225 lb)

Career information
- NBA draft: 2005: undrafted
- Playing career: 2003–2017
- Position: Power forward

Career history
- 2003–2004: Železnik Workers
- 2004–2005: Borac Čačak
- 2005–2006: FMP
- 2006–2008: UNICS Kazan
- 2008–2010: Cajasol Sevilla
- 2010–2011: Valencia Basket
- 2011–2014: Anadolu Efes
- 2014–2016: Bayern Munich
- 2016–2017: Dinamo Sassari

Career highlights
- All-Euroleague Second Team (2011); Adriatic League champion (2006); Turkish League All-Star (2013); German League All-Star (2016)

Duško Savanović (Serbian Cyrillic: Душко Савановић, born September 5, 1983) is a Serbian former professional basketball player. A 2.04 m (6 ft 8 1/2 in) power forward, he represented the Serbian national basketball team internationally and was an All-Euroleague Second Team selection in 2011.

== Professional career ==
=== Early years ===
In his first three years of the professional career, Savanović played for domestic clubs, two seasons with the FMP and one season with the Borac Čačak, both participants of the YUBA League. He helped FMP to win the Adriatic League title in 2006, the second in the club's history.

=== UNICS Kazan ===
In October 2006, after almost ten years of playing with the FMP (including his youth career), he signed a two-year contract with the Russian basketball team UNICS Kazan. UNICS also participated in the ULEB Cup. In his second season in the club, he played 15 games in the ULEB Cup and averaged 11.2 points and 3.9 rebounds per game helping his team to reach the Final Eight, while in the Russian League he averaged 11 points and 4.7 rebounds over 22 games.

=== Cajasol ===
On 27 June 2008, Savanović signed with the Spanish basketball team Cajasol. In the 2008–09 season, he averaged 14.7 points on 41% three-point shooting and 4.8 rebounds in 36 games in the ACB League. He led Cajasol to its best season of the decade, reaching the Spanish King's Cup final eight and the ACB League playoffs for the first time since 2000.

=== Valencia BC ===
After two seasons of playing for Cajasol, on 14 June 2010, Savanović signed with another Spanish team Valencia Power Electronics. Power Electronics was Savanović's first Euroleague club. In his first season in the Euroleague he averaged 11.9 points and 4.6 rebounds in 21 games at the European elite competition. He was named All-Euroleague Second Team at the end of the season.

=== Anadolu Efes ===
On 20 June 2011, after one season with the Valencia, Savanović signed a three-year contract with Turkish team Anadolu Efes. In 16 games (8 as starter) in the Euroleague, he averaged 10 points and 5.6 rebounds per game, while in the regular season of the Turkish Basketball League he averaged 12.6 points and 5.4 rebounds per game.

=== Bayern Munich ===
On July 18, 2014, he signed a two-year deal with the German team Bayern Munich.

=== Dinamo Sassari ===
On June 4, 2016, Savanović signed with Dinamo Sassari for the 2016–17 season. After the end of the season, in May 2017, his agent confirmed that he has retired from professional basketball.

== Serbian national team ==
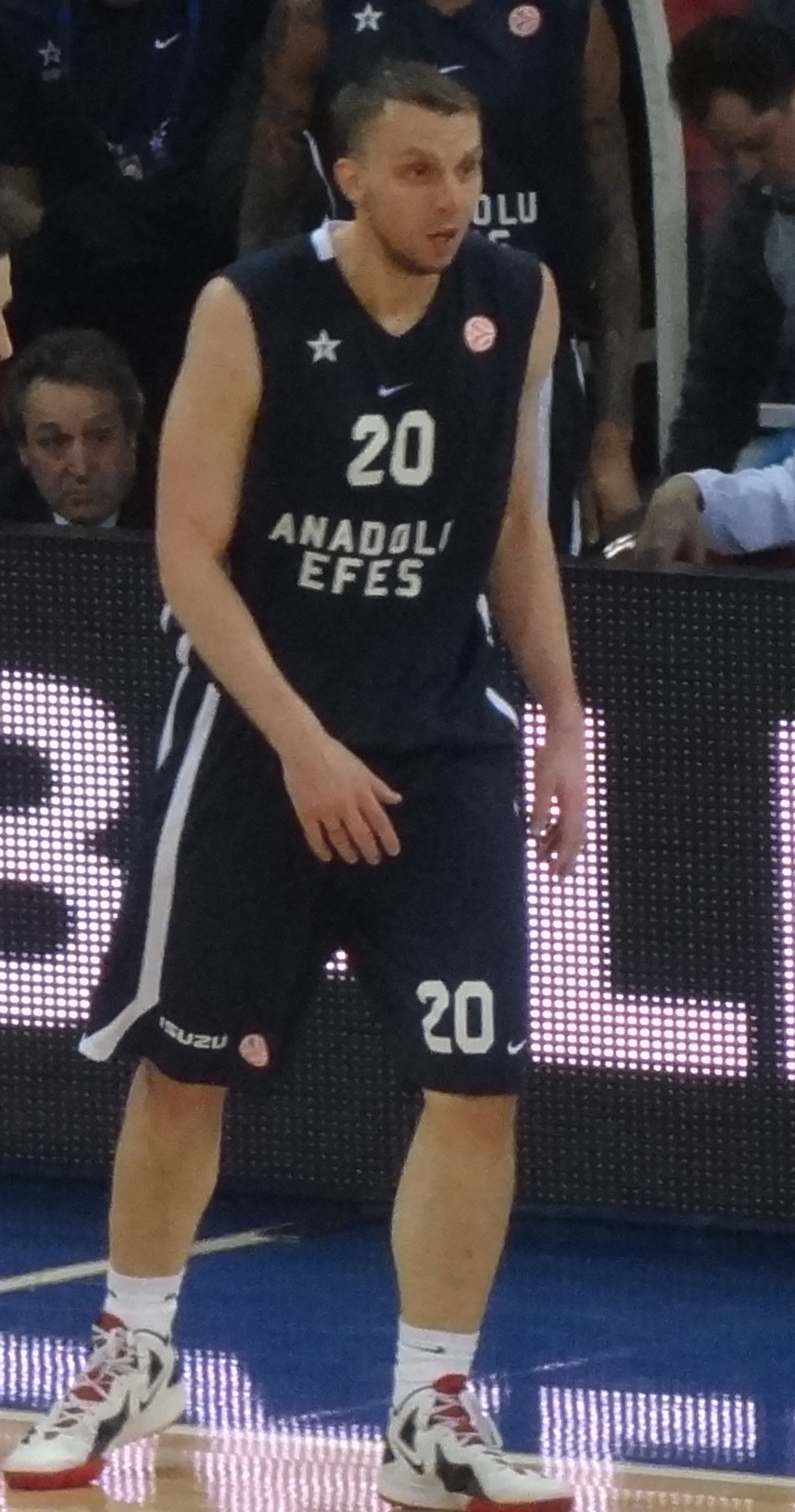
Savanović with Anadolu Efes in 2012

Savanović has been a member of the Serbian national team at the 2010 FIBA World Championship where Serbia was defeated 99–88 by Lithuania in the game for the bronze medal. He was capped for the national team of Serbia at the EuroBasket 2011 in Lithuania where Serbia finished 8th. He averaged 13.4 points and 3.6 rebounds per game.

== Career statistics ==
Legend
GP	Games played	GS	Games started	MPG	Minutes per game
FG%	Field-goal percentage	3P%	3-point field-goal percentage	FT%	Free-throw percentage
RPG	Rebounds per game	APG	Assists per game	SPG	Steals per game
BPG	Blocks per game	PPG	Points per game	PIR	Performance index rating
**Bold**	Career high

=== Euroleague ===
Year	Team	GP	GS	MPG	FG%	3P%	FT%	RPG	APG	SPG	BPG	PPG	PIR
2010–11	Valencia	21	13	25.4	.450	.365	**.851**	4.6	1.0	.8	**.4**	11.9	12.0
2011–12	Anadolu Efes	16	8	**27.1**	.371	.345	.824	5.6	1.1	.8	**.4**	10.0	11.8
2012–13	Anadolu Efes	**29**	**25**	22.7	.416	.320	.814	3.7	1.0	**1.0**	.1	9.4	9.8
2013–14	Anadolu Efes	23	19	26.1	.411	.344	.694	3.7	**2.2**	.7	.3	10.5	10.2
2014–15	Bayern	10	6	25.2	**.451**	**.462**	.750	4.4	1.2	.7	.2	**13.1**	**13.2**
2015–16	Bayern	9	9	24.4	.411	.300	.846	**5.8**	1.7	**1.0**	.2	11.2	11.2
**Career**		108	80	25.0	.419	.351	.790	4.4	1.4	.8	.3	10.7	11.0

== See also ==
- List of Serbia men's national basketball team players
