= Víctor Luengo =

Spanish basketball player

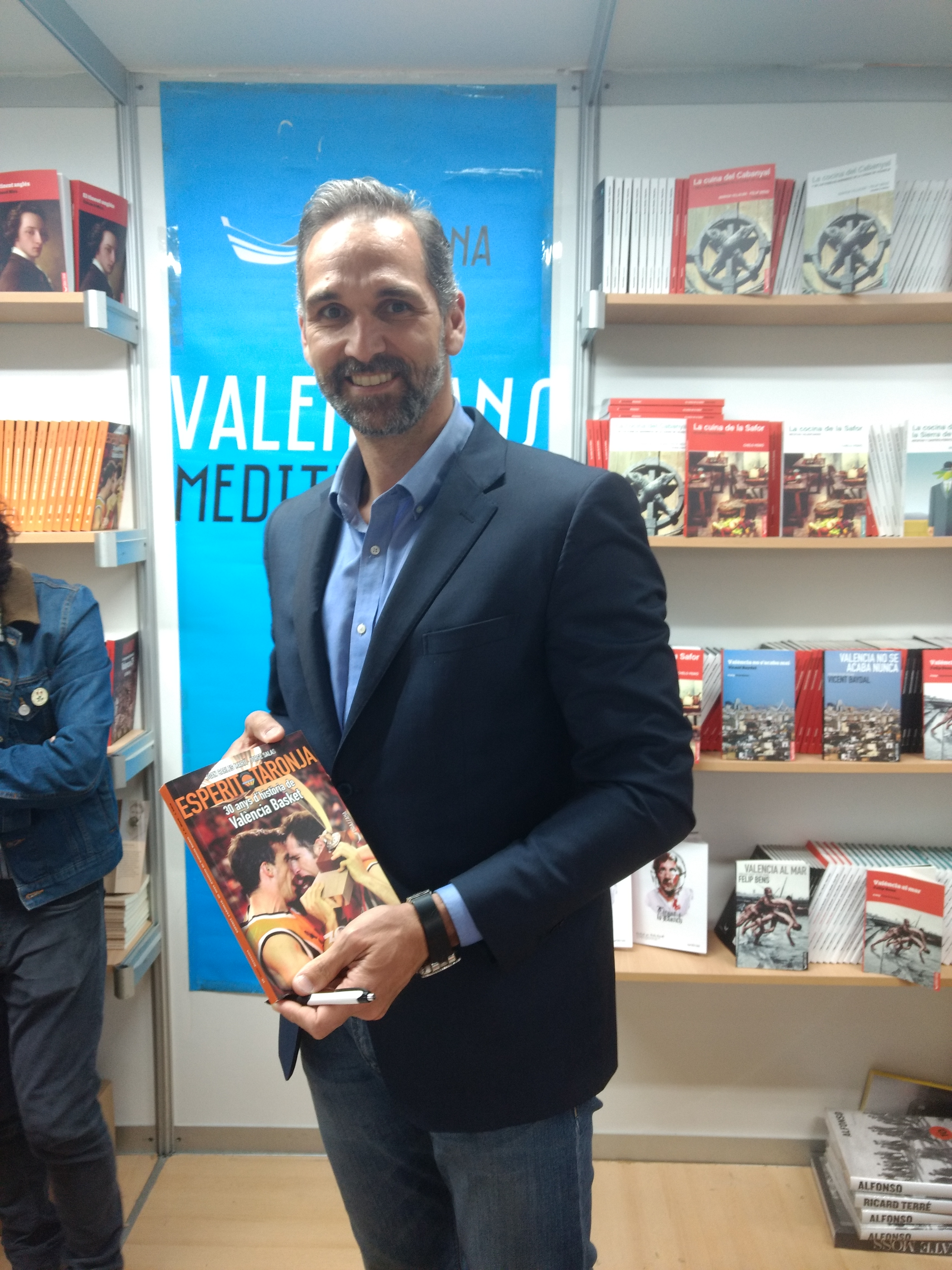
- Víctor Luengo

Personal information
- Born: February 1, 1974 (age 52) Valencia, Spain
- Listed height: 196 cm (6 ft 5 in)

Career information
- Playing career: 1992–2009
- Position: Shooting guard / small forward
- Number: 15

Career history
- 1992–2007: Valencia Basket
- 2007–2009: Gandía BA

Career highlights
- No. 15 retired by Valencia Basket; ULEB Cup champion (2003); Spanish Cup winner (1998)

Víctor José Luengo Ciscar (born February 1, 1974) is a former Spanish professional basketball player. Luengo played the majority of his career with Valencia Basket, as he spent 14 seasons with the club. He finished his career with two seasons for Gandía BA in the second division LEB Oro. His jersey number 15 was retired by Valencia.
