= 1989 Lliga Catalana de Bàsquet =

- League: Lliga Catalana de Bàsquet
- Sport: Basketball
- Number of teams: 6
- Top scorer: (United States) Marvin Alexander (Valvi Girona) 29.0
- Finals champions: (Catalonia) FC Barcelona Banca Catalana
- Runners-up: (Catalonia) Grupo IFA Granollers

Lliga Catalana de Bàsquet seasons
- ← 1988 1990 →

The 1989 Lliga Catalana de Bàsquet was the tenth edition of the Catalan Basketball League.

== Group stage ==
=== Group A ===
	Team	Pld	W	L	PF	PA	PD	Qualification
1	Grupo IFA Granollers	2	2	0	171	153	+18	
2	Ram Joventut	2	1	1	173	159	+14	
3	TDK Manresa	2	0	2	156	188	–32	

Local \ Visitor	GRA	CJB	MAN
Grupo IFA Granollers		80-76	91-77
Ram Joventut			97-79
TDK Manresa			

=== Group B ===
	Team	Pld	W	L	PF	PA	PD	Qualification
1	FC Barcelona Banca Catalana	2	2	0	175	139	+36	
2	Valvi Girona	2	1	1	206	193	+13	
3	Andorra	2	0	2	164	213	–49	

Local \ Visitor	FCB	GIR	AND
FC Barcelona Banca Catalana		112-96	103-83
Valvi Girona			110-81
Andorra			

== Final ==
4 October 1989

FC Barcelona Banca Catalana	99–88	Grupo IFA Granollers
Scoring by half: 49–51, 50–37
Pts: Martínez 28; Rebs: Martínez 10; Asts: Solozábal 4 Rec: Costa 4		Pts: Bosch 30; Rebs: Riley 8 Asts: Creus 2 Rec: Davis 2

Palau dels Esports de Barcelona, Barcelona
Referees: Mas, Galerón

FC Barcelona Banca Catalana	Grupo IFA Granollers

1989 Lliga Catalana de Bàsquet Champions

FC Barcelona Banca Catalana
7th title
