= 1987 Lliga Catalana de Bàsquet =

- League: Lliga Catalana de Bàsquet
- Sport: Basketball
- Number of teams: 6
- Top scorer: (United States) Kenneth Simpson (TDK Manresa) 46
- Finals champions: (Catalonia) Ram Joventut
- Runners-up: (Catalonia) FC Barcelona

Lliga Catalana de Bàsquet seasons
- ← 1986 1988 →

The 1987 Lliga Catalana de Bàsquet was the eighth edition of the Catalan Basketball League.

== Group stage ==
=== Group A ===
	Team	Pld	W	L	PF	PA	PD	Qualification
1	FC Barcelona	2	2	0	193	150	+43	
2	Cacaolat Granollers	2	1	1	157	155	+2	
3	Sant Josep Girona	2	0	2	144	189	–45	

Local \ Visitor	FCB	GRA	SJG
FC Barcelona		82-78	111-71
Cacaolat Granollers			78-73
Sant Josep Girona			

=== Group B ===
	Team	Pld	W	L	PF	PA	PD	Qualification
1	Ram Joventut	2	2	0	224	182	+42	
2	TDK Manresa	2	1	1	206	189	+17	
3	Grupo IFA Español	2	0	2	152	211	–59	

Local \ Visitor	CJB	MAN	ESP
Ram Joventut		114-105	110-77
TDK Manresa			101-75
Grupo IFA Español			

== Final ==
11 September 1987
21:15

Ram Joventut	90–82	FC Barcelona
Scoring by half: 45–50, 45–32
Pts: Johnson 34; Rebs: Meriweather 7 Asts: Margall 2 Rec: Johnson 3		Pts: Jiménez 20; Rebs: Trumbo 8 Asts: San Epifanio 2 Rec: Solozábal 4

Palau dels Esports de Barcelona, Barcelona
Attendance: 8.000
Referees: Sanchis, Catalán

Ram Joventut	FC Barcelona

1987 Lliga Catalana de Bàsquet Champions

Ram Joventut
2nd title
