= 1982 Lliga Catalana de Bàsquet =

- League: Lliga Catalana de Bàsquet
- Sport: Basketball
- Number of teams: 6
- Season MVP: (Spain) Josep Maria Margall (Joventut Fichet)
- Top scorer: (Spain) Javier Mendiburu (Areslux Granollers) 22.3
- Finals champions: (Catalonia) FC Barcelona
- Runners-up: (Catalonia) Joventut Fichet

Lliga Catalana de Bàsquet seasons
- ← 1981 1983 →

The 1982 Lliga Catalana de Bàsquet was the third edition of the Catalan Basketball League. As a novelty, there was a change in the competition system, dividing into two groups and also for the first time appeared a team of a lower category (Español), since there were only 5 Catalan teams in the first division. The title was won again by FC Barcelona, with an easily winning against the FIBA Korać Cup champions Joventut Fichet in a newly filled Palau dels Esports. Also, for the first time, and as a novelty at that time, Josep Maria Margall was awarded the best player in the competition, who was also the absolute maximum scorer of the competition with 105 points (21 points per game).

== Group stage ==
=== Group A ===
	Team	Pld	W	L	PF	PA	PD	Qualification	
1	FC Barcelona	4	4	0	0	407	350	+57	8
2	Areslux Granollers	4	2	0	2	361	329	+32	4
3	Seguros Velázquez Manresa	4	0	0	4	327	416	+41	0

Local \ Visitant	FCB	GRA	MAN
FC Barcelona		94-84	125-84
Areslux Granollers	86-88		101-76
Seguros Velázquez Manresa	96-100	71-90	

=== Group B ===
	Team	Pld	W	L	PF	PA	PD	Qualification	
1	Joventut Fichet	4	3	1	0	418	331	+87	7
2	Cotonificio	4	2	1	1	363	339	+24	5
3	Español	4	0	0	4	308	419	-111	0

Local \ Visitant	CJB	COT	ESP
Joventut Fichet		82-82	114-68
Cotonificio	92-106		91-79
Español	89-116	72-98	

== Final ==
October 12, 1982
11:45

FC Barcelona	122–86	Joventut Fichet
Scoring by half: 65–42, 57–44
Pts: Sibilio 32		Pts: Margall 28

Palau dels Esports, Barcelona
Attendance: 8.000
Referees: Pardo, Mas

FC Barcelona	Joventut Fichet

1982 Lliga Catalana de Bàsquet Champions

FC Barcelona
3rd title
