= 1988 Lliga Catalana de Bàsquet =

- League: Lliga Catalana de Bàsquet
- Sport: Basketball
- Number of teams: 6
- Top scorer: (Spain) Joan Creus (Cacaolat Granollers) 25.0
- Finals champions: (Catalonia) Ram Joventut
- Runners-up: (Catalonia) FC Barcelona

Lliga Catalana de Bàsquet seasons
- ← 1987 1989 →

The 1988 Lliga Catalana de Bàsquet was the ninth edition of the Catalan Basketball League.

== Group stage ==
=== Group A ===
	Team	Pld	W	L	PF	PA	PD	Qualification
1	Ram Joventut	2	2	0	167	151	+16	
2	Cacaolat Granollers	2	1	1	171	151	+20	
3	Valvi Girona	2	0	2	155	191	–36	

Local \ Visitor	CJB	GRA	GIR
Ram Joventut		77-70	90-81
Cacaolat Granollers			101-74
Valvi Girona			

=== Group B ===
	Team	Pld	W	L	PF	PA	PD	Qualification
1	FC Barcelona	2	1	1	181	167	+14	
2	Grupo IFA Español	2	1	1	172	174	–2	
3	TDK Manresa	2	1	1	147	159	–12	

Local \ Visitor	FCB	ESP	MAN
FC Barcelona		94-100	87-67
Grupo IFA Español			72-80
TDK Manresa			

== Final ==
24 December 1988
19:00

Ram Joventut	78–74	FC Barcelona
Scoring by half: 43–33, 35–41
Pts: Villacampa 20; Rebs: Jones 11; Asts: Margall 3 Rec: Margall 4		Pts: San Epifanio, Trumbo 13; Rebs: Waiters 10; Asts: Solozábal 5 Rec: Solozábal 4

Palau dels Esports de Barcelona, Barcelona
Referees: Sanchis, Alzuria

Ram Joventut	FC Barcelona

1988 Lliga Catalana de Bàsquet Champions

Ram Joventut
3rd title
