= 1980 Lliga Catalana de Bàsquet =

- League: Lliga Catalana de Bàsquet
- Sport: Basketball
- Number of teams: 6
- Season champions: FC Barcelona
- Top scorer: (United States) Essie Hollis (Areslux Granollers) 27.3
- Finals champions: (Catalonia) FC Barcelona
- Runners-up: (Catalonia) Cotonificio

Lliga Catalana de Bàsquet seasons
- 1981 →

The 1980 Lliga Catalana de Bàsquet was the first edition of the Catalan Basketball League. It was contested by six teams, and it run from September 13, 1980, to November 26, 1980.

== Regular season ==
=== Standings ===
Pos	Team	Pld	W	L	PF	PA	PD	Qualification
1	FC Barcelona	10	8	2	942	796	+146	Advance to Final
2	Cotonificio	10	7	3	840	818	+22	Advance to Final
3	Joventut Freixenet	10	5	5	863	863	0	
4	Areslux Granollers	10	4	6	863	882	–19	
5	Manresa	10	4	6	869	868	+1	
6	L'Hospitalet	10	2	8	788	938	–150	

=== Results ===
Local \ Visitant	FCB	COT	CJB	GRA	MAN	HOS
FC Barcelona		90–62	99-75	96–90	104-80	106–66
Cotonificio	78–95		92–84	80–79	85–83	96-66
Joventut Freixenet	87–77	81–79		92–76	98–103	85–71
Areslux Granollers	84–105	81–87	88–81		92–83	104–89
Manresa	89–77	75–91	97–78	79–87		104–77
L'Hospitalet	85–93	84–90	81–102	90-82	79–76	

== Final ==
November 26, 1980
20:30

FC Barcelona	90–73	Cotonificio
Scoring by half: 45–38, 45–35
Pts: Sibilio 26; Rebs: De la Cruz, 9		Pts: Costa 17; Rebs: Jiménez 10

Palau dels Esports de Barcelona, Barcelona
Attendance: 8.000
Referees: Bagué, Marcé

FC Barcelona	Cotonificio

1980 Lliga Catalana de Bàsquet Champions

FC Barcelona
1st title
