= 1983 Lliga Catalana de Bàsquet =

- League: Lliga Catalana de Bàsquet
- Sport: Basketball
- Teams: 6
- Finals champions: (Catalonia) FC Barcelona
- Runners-up: (Catalonia) Areslux Granollers

Lliga Catalana de Bàsquet seasons
- ← 1982 1984 →

The 1983 Lliga Catalana de Bàsquet was the fourth edition of the Catalan Basketball League. A certain disinterest was detected both in the fans and in the clubs as far as the competition was concerned, as it began to make it difficult to agree with pre-season preparation matches. This competition was the last for Cotonificio to play as a professional team, deleting the section for economic reasons once the ACB league started, where the team would play in Santa Coloma de Gramenet as CB Santa Coloma with the sponsorship of Licor 43, dedicating the socio-cultural Badalonina entity to the practice of training basketball and amateur as one more section.

== Group stage ==
=== Group A ===
	Team	Pld	W	L	PF	PA	PD	Qualification
1	FC Barcelona	4	4	0	396	324	+72	
2	L'Hospitalet ATO	4	1	3	321	361	–40	
3	Ebro Manresa	4	1	3	341	373	–32	

Local \ Visitant	FCB	HOS	MAN
FC Barcelona		98-77	110-94
L'Hospitalet ATO	69-100		98-75
Ebro Manresa	84-88	88-77	

=== Group B ===
	Team	Pld	W	L	PF	PA	PD	Qualification
1	Areslux Granollers	4	3	1	351	352	–1	
2	Joventut Massana	4	2	2	337	326	+11	
3	Cotonificio	4	1	3	353	463	-110	

Local \ Visitant	GRA	CJB	COT
Areslux Granollers		92-88	105-101
Joventut Massana	72-73		92-76
Cotonificio	91-81	83-85	

== Final ==
September 15, 1983

FC Barcelona	86–85	Areslux Granollers
Scoring by half: 46–40, 40–45
Pts: San Epifanio 30		Pts: Jones 23

Palau dels Esports, Barcelona
Attendance: 2.000
Referees: Sanchis, Galerón

FC Barcelona	Areslux Granollers

1983 Lliga Catalana de Bàsquet Champions

FC Barcelona
4th title
