= 1986 Lliga Catalana de Bàsquet =

- League: Lliga Catalana de Bàsquet
- Sport: Basketball
- Number of teams: 6
- Season MVP: (United States) Mike Schultz (Ron Negrita Joventut)
- Top scorer: (United States) Mike Zeno (Mataró) 32.3
- Finals champions: (Catalonia) Ron Negrita Joventut
- Runners-up: (Catalonia) FC Barcelona

Lliga Catalana de Bàsquet seasons
- ← 1985 1987 →

The 1986 Lliga Catalana de Bàsquet was the seventh edition of the Catalan Basketball League.

== Group stage ==
=== Group A ===
	Team	Pld	W	L	PF	PA	PD	Qualification
1	FC Barcelona	4	3	1	371	305	+66	
2	TDK Manresa	4	2	2	326	345	–19	
3	Gin MG Sarriá	4	1	3	337	384	–47	

Local \ Visitor	FCB	MAN	ESP
FC Barcelona		92-67	101-68
TDK Manresa	79-75		93-88
Gin MG Sarriá	91-103	90-87	

=== Group B ===
	Team	Pld	W	L	PF	PA	PD	Qualification
1	Ron Negrita Joventut	4	4	0	418	350	+68	
2	Cacaolat Granollers	4	1	3	358	393	–35	
3	Mataró	4	1	3	377	410	–33	

Local \ Visitor	CJB	GRA	MAT
Ron Negrita Joventut		113-83	101-95
Cacaolat Granollers	95-111		91-96
Mataró	77-93	91-107	

== Final ==
30 September 1986
22:00

Ron Negrita Joventut	98–97	FC Barcelona
Scoring by half: 51–52, 47–45
Pts: Schultz 28; Rebs: Johnson, Schultz 12; Asts: Johnson, Schultz, Montero 1 Rec: Johnson 4		Pts: Sibilio 32; Rebs: Bryant 10; Asts: Solozábal, San Epifanio, Simpson 1 Rec: Bryant, San Epifanio 3

Pavelló del CB Granollers, Granollers
Referees: Mitjana, Fernández

Ron Negrita Joventut	FC Barcelona

1986 Lliga Catalana de Bàsquet Champions

Ron Negrita Joventut
1st title
