= 1981 Lliga Catalana de Bàsquet =

- League: Lliga Catalana de Bàsquet
- Sport: Basketball
- Teams: 6
- Season champions: FC Barcelona
- Top scorer: (United States) Essie Hollis (Areslux Granollers)
- Finals champions: FC Barcelona

Lliga Catalana de Bàsquet seasons
- ← 1980 1982 →

The 1981 Lliga Catalana de Bàsquet was the second edition of the Catalan Basketball League. The competitionwas contested by six teams and the title game take place in the Palau dels Esports of Barcelona.

== Regular season ==
=== Standings ===
	Team	Pld	W	L	PF	PA	PD	Qualification
1	FC Barcelona	6	6	0	596	501	+95	Advance to Semifinals
2	Areslux Granollers	6	3	3	524	467	+57	Advance to Semifinals
3	Joventut Sony	6	3	3	565	524	+41	Advance to Semifinals
4	Cotonificio	6	3	3	480	512	–32	Advance to Semifinals
5	Caixa Manresa	6	2	4	492	568	–76	
6	La Salle Barcelona	6	1	5	506	591	–85	

=== Results ===
	FCB	GRA	JOV	COT	MAN	LSA
FC Barcelona		97-66	100-97	91-87		
Areslux Granollers	75-86				118-84	89–72
Joventut Sony		90-68			98-76	84–96
Cotonificio		38-108	94-83		86-64	
Caixa Manresa	80-105			90-85		98–76
La Salle Barcelona	96-117		90-113	76-90		

== Semifinals ==
Team 1	Agg.	Team 2	1st leg	2nd leg
Cotonificio (Catalonia)	155–156	(Catalonia) FC Barcelona	75–64	80–92
Joventut Sony (Catalonia)	165–160	(Catalonia) Areslux Granollers	79–74	86–86

== Final ==
October 29, 1981
20:30

92-87: Barça, Todo un campeon

FC Barcelona	92–87	Joventut Sony
Scoring by half: 46–45, 46–42
Pts: Sibilio 34		Pts: Housey 26

Palau dels Esports, Barcelona
Attendance: 8.000
Referees: Marcé, Bagué

FC Barcelona	Joventut Sony

1981 Lliga Catalana de Bàsquet Champions

FC Barcelona
2nd title
