= 1985 Lliga Catalana de Bàsquet =

- League: Lliga Catalana de Bàsquet
- Sport: Basketball
- Number of teams: 6
- Season MVP: (Spain) Andrés Jiménez (Ron Negrita Joventut)
- Top scorer: (Panama) Rolando Frazer (TDK Manresa) 28.8
- Finals champions: (Catalonia) FC Barcelona
- Runners-up: (Catalonia) Ron Negrita Joventut

Lliga Catalana de Bàsquet seasons
- ← 1984 1986 →

The 1985 Lliga Catalana de Bàsquet was the sixth edition of the Catalan Basketball League.

== Group stage ==
=== Group A ===
	Team	Pld	W	L	PF	PA	PD	Qualification
1	FC Barcelona	4	3	1	394	339	+55	
2	Español Juver	4	2	2	359	402	–43	
3	Santa Coloma	4	1	3	371	383	–12	

Local \ Visitor	FCB	ESP	SC
FC Barcelona		104-72	94-83
Español	98-96		99-86
Santa Coloma	86-100	106-90	

=== Group B ===
	Team	Pld	W	L	PF	PA	PD	Qualification
1	Ron Negrita Joventut	4	4	0	360	327	+33	
2	Cacaolat Granollers	4	2	2	340	334	+6	
3	TDK Manresa	4	0	4	327	366	–39	

Local \ Visitor	CJB	GRA	MAN
Ron Negrita Joventut		86-70	84-78
Cacaolat Granollers	88-90		86-76
TDK Manresa	91-100	82-96	

== Final ==
September 24, 1985
19:00

FC Barcelona	91–90	Ron Negrita Joventut
Scoring by half: 41–45, 50–45
Pts: Sibilio 23; Rebs: Wiltjer 10		Pts: Jiménez 18; Rebs: Stewart 9

Pavelló Josep Mora, Mataró
Attendance: 4.000
Referees: Mas, Pizarro

FC Barcelona	Ron Negrita Joventut

1985 Lliga Catalana de Bàsquet Champions

FC Barcelona
6th title
