= 1984 Lliga Catalana de Bàsquet =

- League: Lliga Catalana de Bàsquet
- Sport: Basketball
- Number of teams: 6
- Season MVP: (Spain) Juan Antonio San Epifanio (FC Barcelona)
- Top scorer: (Spain) Javier Mendiburu (Areslux Granollers) 26
- Finals champions: (Catalonia) FC Barcelona
- Runners-up: (Catalonia) Ron Negrita Joventut

Lliga Catalana de Bàsquet seasons
- ← 1983 1985 →

The 1984 Lliga Catalana de Bàsquet was the fifth edition of the Catalan Basketball League.

== Group stage ==
=== Group A ===
	Team	Pld	W	L	PF	PA	PD	Qualification
1	FC Barcelona	4	3	1	382	332	+50	
2	Licor 43	4	3	1	329	330	–1	
3	Español	4	0	4	322	371	–49	

Local \ Visitor	FCB	LIC	ESP
FC Barcelona		93-79	101-68
Licor 43	85-83		75-71
Español	100-105	83-90	

=== Group B ===
	Team	Pld	W	L	PF	PA	PD	Qualification
1	Ron Negrita Joventut	2	1	1	85	90	–5	
2	Cacaolat Granollers*	2	1	1	90	95	+5	
3	Pineda**	0	0	0	0	0	0	

^{*}Cacaolat Granollers was not present at the first game against Ron Negrita Joventut.

^{**}Pineda retired from the competition before starting.

Local \ Visitor	CJB	GRA	PIN
Ron Negrita Joventut		92-88	105-101
Cacaolat Granollers	72-73		92-76
Pineda	91-81	83-85	

== Final ==
October 12, 1984
12:00

FC Barcelona	102–100	Ron Negrita Joventut
Scoring by half: 55–46, 47–54
Pts: San Epifanio 39		Pts: Jiménez 23

Pavelló Municipal, Girona
Attendance: 4.000
Referees: Marcé, Amorós

FC Barcelona	Ron Negrita Joventut

1984 Lliga Catalana de Bàsquet Champions

FC Barcelona
5th title
