= 1984–85 ACB season =

ACB Primera División
- Season: 1984–85
- Games played: 258
- Teams: 16

Regular season
- Relegated: Caja Ronda; Lucky Canarias; Collado Villalba

Finals
- Champions: Real Madrid; 2nd ACB title 24th Spanish title
- Runners-up: Ron Negrita Joventut
- Semifinalists: FC Barcelona; Licor 43

The 1984–85 ACB season was the 2nd season of the ACB Primera División, the top Spanish professional basketball league. It started on 23 September 1984 with the first round of the regular season and ended on 1 May 1985 with the finals. In this season, the league introduced the new FIBA rules with the three-point field goal as the main change.

Real Madrid won their second consecutive ACB title, and their 24th Spanish title.

== Teams ==
=== Promotion and relegation (pre-season) ===
A total of 16 teams contested the league, including 13 sides from the 1983–84 season and three promoted from the 1983–84 Primera División B.

Teams promoted from Primera División B

- RCD Espanyol
- Breogán Caixa Galicia
- ~~Atlético Madrid~~ (sold its berth to Collado Villalba)

=== Venues and locations ===
Location of teams in 1984–85 ACB
Location of Madrid teams in 1984–85 ACB
Location of teams from Barcelona in 1984–85 ACB
Location of teams from the Canary Islands in 1984–85 ACB

Team	Home city	Arena
Breogán Caixa Galicia	Lugo	Municipal
Cacaolat Granollers	Granollers	Municipal
CAI Zaragoza	Zaragoza	Palacio de Deportes
Caja Álava	Vitoria-Gasteiz	Mendizorrotza
Caja Ronda	Málaga	Ciudad Jardín
Cajamadrid	Alcalá de Henares	Municipal
Clesa Ferrol	Ferrol	Punta Arnela
Collado Villalba	Collado Villalba	Municipal
Estudiantes	Madrid	Antonio Magariños
FC Barcelona	Barcelona	Palau Blaugrana
Fórum Valladolid	Valladolid	Huerta del Rey
Licor 43	Santa Coloma de Gramenet	Municipal
Lucky Canarias	San Cristóbal de La Laguna	Colegio Luther King
RCD Espanyol	Barcelona	Palau dels Esports
Real Madrid	Madrid	Ciudad Deportiva
Ron Negrita Joventut	Badalona	Club Joventut Badalona

== First phase ==
=== Group Odd ===
Pos	Team	Pld	W	L	PF	PA	PD	Pts	Qualification
1	Real Madrid	14	13	1	1358	1122	+236	27	Qualification to Group A1
2	Ron Negrita Joventut	14	12	2	1337	1163	+174	26	Qualification to Group A1
3	Breogán Caixa Galicia	14	7	7	1159	1223	−64	21	Qualification to Group A1
4	Caja Álava	14	6	8	1202	1272	−70	20	Qualification to Group A1
5	Clesa Ferrol	14	5	9	1212	1213	−1	19	Qualification to Group A2
6	Lucky Canarias	14	5	9	1148	1211	−63	19	Qualification to Group A2
7	Estudiantes	14	5	9	1200	1274	−74	19	Qualification to Group A2
8	Cajamadrid	14	3	11	1207	1345	−138	17	Qualification to Group A2

Source: Linguasport

=== Group Even ===
Pos	Team	Pld	W	L	PF	PA	PD	Pts	Qualification
1	FC Barcelona	14	12	2	1355	1205	+150	26	Qualification to Group A1
2	Fórum Valladolid	14	10	4	1194	1167	+27	24	Qualification to Group A1
3	Licor 43	14	8	6	1277	1163	+114	22	Qualification to Group A1
4	Cacaolat Granollers	14	7	7	1132	1168	−36	21	Qualification to Group A1
5	CAI Zaragoza	14	7	7	1255	1255	0	21	Qualification to Group A2
6	Caja Ronda	14	6	8	1254	1299	−45	20	Qualification to Group A2
7	RCD Espanyol	14	4	10	1132	1239	−107	18	Qualification to Group A2
8	Collado Villalba	14	2	12	1190	1293	−103	16	Qualification to Group A2

Source: Linguasport

== Second phase ==
=== Group A1 ===
Pos	Team	Pld	W	L	PF	PA	PD	Pts	Qualification
1	Real Madrid	14	14	0	1340	1065	+275	28	Qualification to quarterfinals
2	FC Barcelona	14	11	3	1322	1231	+91	25	Qualification to quarterfinals
3	Ron Negrita Joventut	14	9	5	1250	1129	+121	23	Qualification to quarterfinals
4	Licor 43	14	8	6	1281	1273	+8	22	Qualification to quarterfinals
5	Fórum Valladolid	14	5	9	1140	1228	−88	19	Qualification to first round
6	Cacaolat Granollers	14	4	10	1129	1198	−69	18	Qualification to first round
7	Breogán Caixa Galicia	14	3	11	1092	1314	−222	17	Qualification to first round
8	Caja Álava	14	2	12	1227	1343	−116	16	Qualification to first round

Source: Linguasport

=== Group A2 ===
Pos	Team	Pld	W	L	PF	PA	PD	Pts	Qualification
1	Estudiantes	14	12	2	1249	1160	+89	26	Qualification to first round
2	Clesa Ferrol	14	9	5	1305	1285	+20	23	Qualification to first round
3	RCD Espanyol	14	8	6	1203	1185	+18	22	Qualification to first round
4	CAI Zaragoza	14	8	6	1242	1182	+60	22	Qualification to first round
5	Cajamadrid	14	7	7	1226	1216	+10	21	Qualification to relegation playoffs
6	Lucky Canarias	14	5	9	1186	1219	−33	19	Qualification to relegation playoffs
7	Caja Ronda	14	5	9	1255	1307	−52	19	Qualification to relegation playoffs
8	Collado Villalba	14	2	12	1182	1294	−112	16	Qualification to relegation playoffs

Source: Linguasport

== Playoffs ==
=== Championship playoffs ===
First round
A1–8 Caja Álava	73	70
A2–1 Estudiantes	90	77
A1–5 Fórum Valladolid	102	81	80
A2–4 CAI Zaragoza	81	89	86
A1–7 Breogán Caixa Galicia	86	78
A2–2 Clesa Ferrol	81	77
A1–6 Cacaolat Granollers	84	102
A2–3 RCD Espanyol	81	77

Quarterfinals
A1–1 Real Madrid	103	80	116
A2–1 Estudiantes	87	83	98
A1–4 Licor 43	104	88
A2–4 CAI Zaragoza	99	87
A1–2 FC Barcelona	105	90
A1–7 Breogán Caixa Galicia	87	82
A1–3 Joventut	87	92	94
A1–6 Cacaolat Granollers	88	87	84

Semifinals
A1–1 Real Madrid	96	99
A1–4 Licor 43	78	98
A1–2 FC Barcelona	90	66	87
A1–3 Joventut	86	82	89

Finals
A1–1 Real Madrid	86	97	91
A1–3 Joventut	111	76	83

Source: Linguasport

=== Relegation playoffs ===
First round
A2–5 Cajamadrid	96	78	104
A2–8 Collado Villalba	65	82	77
A2–6 Lucky Canarias	74	90
A2–7 Caja Ronda	75	94

Second round
A2–5 Cajamadrid	90	101
A2–7 Caja Ronda	82	86

Source: Linguasport

== Final standings ==
Pos	Team	Pld	W	L	Qualification or relegation
1	Real Madrid (C)	36	33	3	Qualification to European Champions Cup
2	Ron Negrita Joventut	37	26	11	Qualification to European Cup Winners' Cup
3	FC Barcelona	33	26	7	Qualification to European Cup Winners' Cup
4	Licor 43	32	18	14	
5	Cacaolat Granollers	33	14	19	Qualification to Korać Cup
6	Breogán Caixa Galicia	32	12	20	Qualification to Korać Cup
7	Estudiantes	33	20	13	
8	CAI Zaragoza	33	17	16	Qualification to Korać Cup
9	Fórum Valladolid	31	16	15	
10	Caja Álava	30	8	22	Qualification to Korać Cup
11	Clesa Ferrol	30	14	16	
12	RCD Espanyol	30	12	18	
13	Cajamadrid	33	14	19	
14	Caja Ronda (R)	32	13	19	Relegation to Primera División B
15	Lucky Canarias (R)	30	10	20	Relegation to Primera División B
16	Collado Villalba (R)	31	5	26	Relegation to Primera División B

Source: Linguasport
(C) Champions; (R) Relegated
