= Lliga Catalana de Bàsquet =

- Organising body: Catalan Basketball Federation
- Founded: 1980
- First season: 1980
- Province: Catalonia
- Number of teams: 6
- Related competitions: Liga ACB
- Current champions: Barcelona (26th title)
- Most championships: Barcelona (26 titles)

The Catalan Basketball League, more commonly known as Lliga Catalana, is the regional preseason professional basketball competition that has been organized by the Catalan Basketball Federation since 1980, in Catalonia, Spain.

Nowadays, only teams that play in ACB (Spanish 1st Division) join the competition.

== Performance by club ==
Club	Winners	Runners-up	Winning years
Barcelona	26	15	1980, 1981, 1982, 1983, 1984, 1985, 1989, 1993, 1995, 2000, 2001, 2004, 2009, 2010, 2011, 2012, 2013, 2014, 2015, 2016, 2017, 2019, 2022, 2023, 2024, 2026
Joventut	11	16	1986, 1987, 1988, 1990, 1991, 1992, 1994, 1998, 2005, 2007, 2008
Manresa	4	6	1997, 1999, 2021, 2025
Andorra	2	4	2018, 2020
Lleida	2	1	2002, 2003
Sant Josep Girona	2	1	1996, 2006
Granollers	0	2	
Círcol Catòlic	0	1	
Força Lleida	0	1	

== Lliga Catalana History ==
Year	Host	Champion	Runner-up	Result	Finals MVP	Coach of the Year	Result of semifinals		Previous rounds	
2026	Tarragona	FC Barcelona	iLERNA Lleida	96–87	Justin Robinson	Aleksander Sekulić	Group A: BAR 2, MAN 1, AND 0		Group B: FLL 2, JOV 1, BGI 0	
2025	Tarragona	Baxi Manresa	Joventut Badalona	83–79	Hugo Benitez	Diego Ocampo	Group A: MAN 1, FLL 1, BGI 1		Group B: JOV 2, BAR 1, AND 0	
2024	Tarragona	FC Barcelona	Baxi Manresa	98–81	Willy Hernangómez	Joan Peñarroya	Group A: BAR 2, AND 1, BGI 0		Group B: MAN 2, FLL 1, JOV 1	
2023	Lleida	FC Barcelona	Baxi Manresa	81–79	Nicolás Laprovíttola	Roger Grimau	FCB 104–92 BGI	MAN 82–65 JOV		
2022	Tarragona	FC Barcelona	Joventut Badalona	92–82	Nicolás Laprovíttola	Šarūnas Jasikevičius	FCB 88–77 BGI	JOV 96–89 MAN		
2021	Manresa	Baxi Manresa	FC Barcelona	81-70	Ismaël Bako	Pedro Martínez	MAN 82–79 AND	FCB 82–69 JOV		
2020	Barcelona	MoraBanc Andorra	FC Barcelona	85-84	Nikola Mirotić	Ibon Navarro	AND 77–75 JOV	FCB 92–82 MAN		
2019	Badalona	FC Barcelona	MoraBanc Andorra	93-92	Nikola Mirotić	Svetislav Pešić	MAN 64–67 AND	JOV 85–87 FCB		
2018	Lleida	MoraBanc Andorra	FC Barcelona Lassa	94–76	Michele Vitali	Ibon Navarro	AND 83–75 JOV	FCB 78-63 MAN		
2017	Reus	FC Barcelona Lassa	MoraBanc Andorra	89–70	Ante Tomić	Svetislav Pešić	JOV 68–80 AND			
2016	Andorra la Vella	FC Barcelona Lassa	ICL Manresa	77–63	Justin Doellman	Georgios Bartzokas	FCB 78–52 JOV	AND 72–77 MAN		
2015	Granollers	FC Barcelona Lassa	MoraBanc Andorra	68–65	Pau Ribas	Xavi Pascual	AND 78–67 JOV	FCB 78–65 MAN		
2014	La Seu	FC Barcelona	MoraBanc Andorra	104–93	Ante Tomić	Xavi Pascual	FCB 82–66 MAN	AND 81–70 JOV		
2013	Girona	FC Barcelona	FIATC Joventut	85–73	Álex Abrines	Xavi Pascual	MAN 78–82 JOV			
2012	Badalona	FC Barcelona Regal	FIATC Mutua Joventut	76–69	—N/a	Xavi Pascual	FCB 80–60 FLL	JOV 88–80 MAN		
2011	Manresa	FC Barcelona Regal	FIATC Mutua Joventut	94–54	—N/a	Xavi Pascual	MAN 87–90 JOV	FCB 81–64 LLE		
2010	Barcelona	Regal FC Barcelona	DKV Joventut	95–79	Terence Morris	Xavi Pascual	JOV 83–71 GIR	FCB 78–71 MAN		
2009	Barcelona	Regal FC Barcelona	DKV Joventut	62–38	Ricky Rubio	Xavi Pascual	JOV 80–58 MAN	FCB 95–53 GIR		
2008	Barcelona	DKV Joventut	Regal FC Barcelona	95–83	Demond Mallet	Sito Alonso	JOV 79–64 LLE	FCB 95–68 MAN		
2007	Badalona	DKV Joventut	Akasvayu Girona	84–66	Rudy Fernández	Aíto García Reneses	GIR 82–60 MAN	FCB 60–83 JOV		
2006	Girona	Akasvayu Girona	Winterthur FC Barcelona	73–51	Ariel McDonald	Svetislav Pešić	FCB 76–75 MAN	JOV 75–90 GIR		
2005	Badalona	DKV Joventut	Winterthur FC Barcelona	79–78	Àlex Mumbrú	Aíto García Reneses	JOV 89–85 GIR	FCB 76–67 MAN		
2004	Barcelona	FC Barcelona	Plus Pujol Lleida	83–63	Roberto Dueñas	Joan Montes	LLE 95–82 MAN	FCB 85–76 JOV	MAN 80–72 GIR	
2003	Lleida	Plus Pujol Lleida	FC Barcelona	68–65	Roger Esteller	Edu Torres	LLE 83–80 JOV	FCB 69–60 GIR	GIR 72–71 MAN	
2002	Lleida	Plus Pujol Lleida	FC Barcelona	80–70	Roger Grimau	Edu Torres	FCB 72–65 MAN	LLE 90–70 JOV	MAN 81–72 GIR	
2001	Barcelona	FC Barcelona	DKV Joventut	95–73	Juan Carlos Navarro	Aíto García Reneses	JOV 87–82 GIR	FCB 105–77 LLE		
2000	Barcelona	FC Barcelona	Minorisa.net Manresa	76–67	Juan Carlos Navarro	Aíto García Reneses	FCB 98–92 GIR	JOV 75-90 MAN		
1999	Granollers	TDK Manresa	Pinturas Bruguer Badalona	81–65	Paco Vázquez	Manel Comas	FCB 69–71 JOV	GIR 62–80 MAN		
1998	Granollers	Pinturas Bruguer Badalona	TDK Manresa	86–71	Iván Corrales	Alfred Julbe	JOV 101–88 GIR	MAN 79–70 FCB		
1997	Girona	TDK Manresa	Festina Joventut	77–76	Derrick Alston	Luis Casimiro	MAN 91–82 FCB	GIR 97–111 JOV	4 more teams	
1996	Manresa	Valvi Girona	TDK Manresa	62–61	Chris Corchiani	Trifón Poch	MAN 80–75 JOV	FCB 69–80 GIR	3 more teams	
1995	Tarragona	FC Barcelona Banca Catalana	7up Joventut	92–89	Artūras Karnišovas	Aíto García Reneses	GIR 76–80 FCB	JOV 88–77 AND	TAR 78–89 GIR	MAN 72–73 AND
1994	Barcelona	7up Joventut	FC Barcelona Banca Catalana	88–72	Jordi Villacampa	Pedro Martínez	COR 51–87 FCB	JOV 68–65 MAN	AND 60–63 COR	MAN 77–66 GIR
1993	Girona	FC Barcelona Banca Catalana	Marbella Joventut	95–89	Juan Antonio San Epifanio	Aíto García Reneses	FCB 84–71 AND	JOV 86–78 MAN	AND 104–77 COR	GIR 74–94 MAN
1992	Manresa	Montigalà Joventut	FC Barcelona Banca Catalana	89–79	Pep Pujolràs	Lolo Sainz	JOV 75–72 MAN	FCB 73–60 AND	MAN 80–77 GRA	GIR 61–71 AND
1991	Girona	Montigalà Joventut	FC Barcelona Banca Catalana	87–73	Corny Thompson	Lolo Sainz	JOV 101–67 GIR	FCB 92–64 GRA	GIR 90–87 AND	GRA 67–63 MAN
1990	Barcelona	Ram Joventut	FC Barcelona Banca Catalana	92–70		Lolo Sainz	FCB 81–76 GIR	JOV 86–61 GRA	GIR 92–90 MAN	GRA 96–71 L'H
1989	Barcelona	FC Barcelona Banca Catalana	Grupo IFA Granollers	99–88		Aíto García Reneses	Group A: FCB 2, GIR 1, AND 0		Group B: GRA 2, JOV 1, MAN 0	
1988	Barcelona	Ram Joventut	FC Barcelona	78–74		Alfred Julbe	Group A: JOV 2, GRA 1, GIR 0		Group B: FCB 2, MAN 1, ESP 0	
1987	Barcelona	Ram Joventut	FC Barcelona	90–82		Alfred Julbe	Group A: FCB 2, GRA 1, GIR 0		Group B: JOV 2, MAN 1, ESP 0	
1986	Granollers	Ron Negrita Joventut	FC Barcelona	98–97		Alfred Julbe	Group A: FCB 3, MAN 2, ESP 1		Group B: JOV 4, MAT 1, GRA 0	
1985	Mataró	FC Barcelona	Ron Negrita Joventut	91–90		Aíto García Reneses	Group A: FCB 3, ESP 2, SC 1		Group B: JOV 4, GRA 2, MAN 0	
1984	Girona	FC Barcelona	Ron Negrita Joventut	102–100		Antoni Serra				
1983	Barcelona	FC Barcelona	Areslux Granollers	86–85		Antoni Serra				
1982	Barcelona	FC Barcelona	Joventut Fichet	122–86		Antoni Serra				
1981	Barcelona	FC Barcelona	Joventut Sony	92–87		Antoni Serra				
1980	Barcelona	FC Barcelona	Cotonificio	90–73		Antoni Serra				

== See also ==
- LEB Catalan basketball league
- Catalan basketball derby
