= 1996 Copa del Rey de Baloncesto =

The 1996 Copa del Rey was the 60th edition of the Spanish basketball Cup. It was organized by the ACB and was played in Murcia in the Palacio de Deportes between February 22 and 25, 1996. TDK Manresa won its first title after defeating FC Barcelona Banca Catalana in the overtime of the final game.

== Bracket ==
Quarterfinals; February 22, 23
FC Barcelona Banca Catalana	95
Amway Zaragoza	77
Real Madrid	85
Caja San Fernando	72
CB Murcia	93
Unicaja	87
TDK Manresa	72
Baloncesto León	58

Semifinals; February 24
FC Barcelona Banca Catalana	80
Real Madrid	72
CB Murcia	78
TDK Manresa	81

Final; February 25
FC Barcelona Banca Catalana	92
TDK Manresa	94
Third place
CB Murcia	68
Real Madrid	74

== Final ==
A three-point shoot at the buzzer of Joan Creus allowed TDK Manresa to win its first title ever.

25 February 1996
20:00 GTM+1

Boxscore

FC Barcelona Banca Catalana	92–94 (OT)	TDK Manresa
Scoring by half: 43–51, 38–30 Overtime: 11–13
Pts: Fernández 26; Rebs: Godfread 14; Asts: Montero 5 PIR: Fernández 28		Pts: Creus 25; Rebs: Williams 8 Asts: Frank 4 PIR: Williams 29

Palacio de Deportes, Murcia
Attendance: 7,500
Referees: Miguel Ángel Betancor, Vicente Bultó

1996 Copa del Rey Champions

TDK Manresa
First title

- MVP of the Tournament: Joan Creus
