= Joaquim Costa =

- Born: 23 January 1936; Portugal
- Died: 15 February 2008; Portugal
- Genres: Rock and roll
- Occupation: Performer

Joaquim Costa (23 January 1936 – 15 February 2008) was a Portuguese rock and roll performer. He was a pioneer in bringing rock and roll to Portugal.
