= Josep Maria Margall =

Spanish basketball player

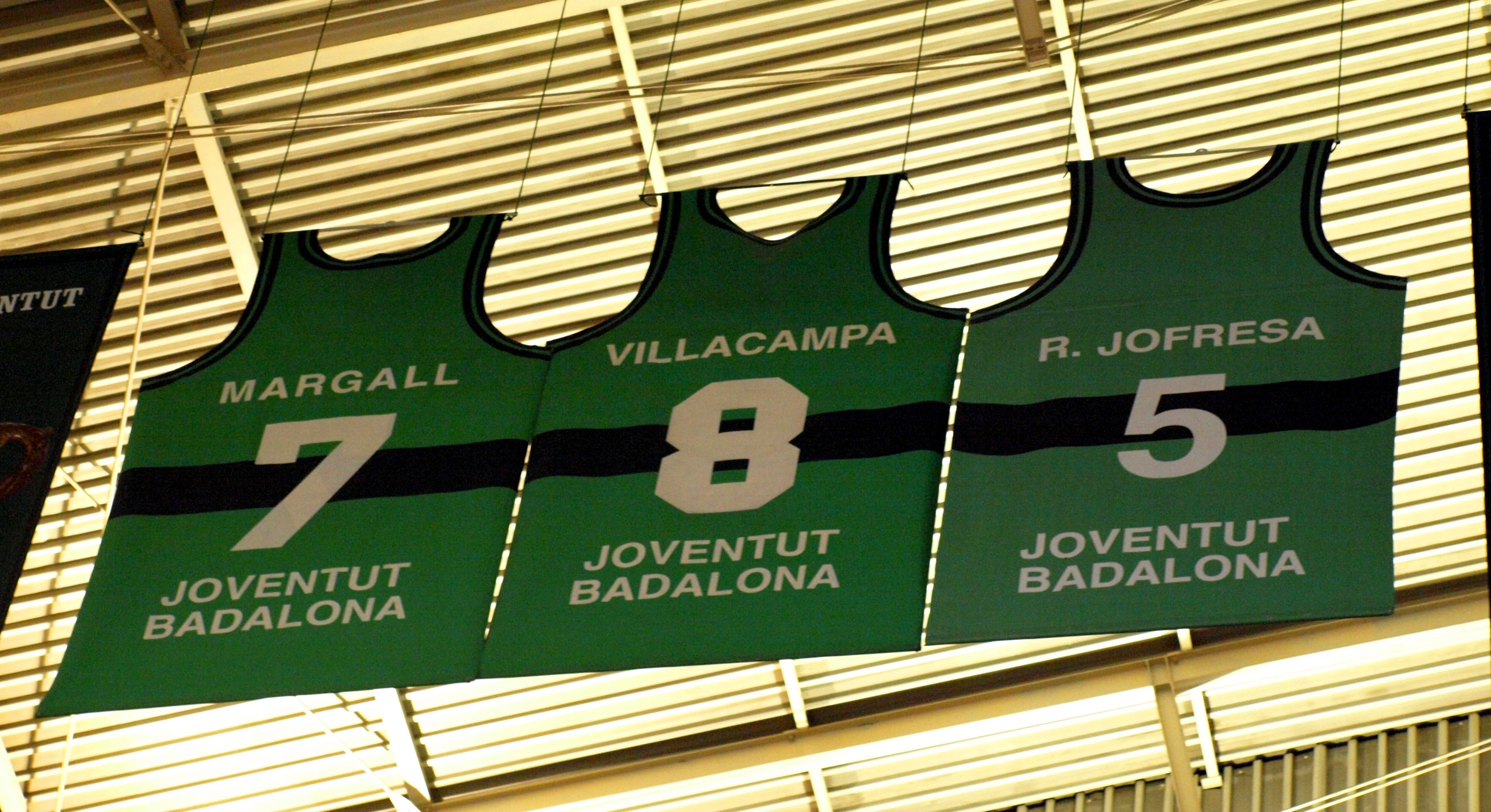
- T-shirts withdrawn from Joventut de Badalalona by JM Margall (7), Jordi Villacampa (8) and Rafael Jofresa (5) at the Olympic Pavilion in Badalona

Personal information
- Born: 17 March 1955 (age 71) Calella, Catalonia, Spain
- Listed height: 6 ft 6 in (1.98 m)

Career information
- NBA draft: 1977: undrafted
- Playing career: 1972–1993
- Position: Small forward
- Number: 7

Career history
- 1972–1990: Joventut Badalona
- 1990–1991: Girona
- 1991–1993: Andorra

Career highlights
- 2× Korać Cup winner (1981, 1990); Spanish League champion (1978); Spanish Cup winner (1976)

Josep Maria Margall i Tauler (Catalan pronunciation: [ʒuˈzɛb məˈɾi.ə məɾˈɣaʎ]; born 17 March 1955) is a Spanish former professional basketball player. Standing at 1.98 m (6 ft 6 in), he played at the small forward position.

== Professional career ==
Margall's number 7 jersey was retired by Joventut Badalona.

== Spain national team ==
Margall earned 187 caps with the senior Spain national basketball team, and competed in the 1980, 1984 and 1988 Summer Olympics.
