= Joan Creus =

Spanish basketball player (born 1956)

Personal information
- Born: November 24, 1956 (age 69) Ripollet, Barcelona, Catalonia, Spain
- Listed height: 5 ft 9.25 in (1.76 m)
- Listed weight: 180 lb (82 kg)

Career information
- Playing career: 1973–1999
- Position: Point guard

Career history

Playing
- 1973–1974: Ripollet
- 1975–1977: L'Hospitalet
- 1977–1980: Granollers
- 1980–1982: Barcelona
- 1982–1993: Granollers
- 1993–1999: Manresa

Coaching
- 2002–2008: Spain (assistant)

Career highlights
- As player: 2× Spanish League champion (1981 LEB, 1998 ACB); Spanish ACB League Finals MVP (1998); 3× Spanish King's Cup winner (1981, 1982, 1996); Spanish King's Cup MVP (1996); 5× Spanish League All-Star (1986, 1987, 1989–1991); Spanish Royal Order of Sports Merit (1997); Olympic Order (1998); No. 7 retired by Bàsquet Manresa
Medals
Men's basketball
Representing Spain
FIBA EuroBasket
Silver medal – second place	1983 France

Joan "Chichi" Creus Molist (born November 24, 1956) is a Spanish former professional basketball player, coach and executive. During his playing career, he played at the point guard position.

== Professional career ==
Creus spent his entire 25-year club career in Catalonia. He first played with the Granollers, with a two-year period with FC Barcelona, where he won one Spanish National League championship and two Spanish National Cups.

In 1993, after the dissolution of the Granollers, Creus signed with the Spanish club TDK Manresa. He led the club to win the two only championships in its history: the 1996 Spanish Copa del Rey and the Spanish Liga ACB in the 1997–98 season. The club's ACB league championship in 1998 is considered to be one of the biggest miracles in the history of Spanish basketball. Creus was named the MVP of both competitions.

In 1999, Creus announced his retirement from playing pro club basketball. He is considered to be an historic player of the Spanish Liga ACB, after having played 20,211 minutes in 585 games, with 7,929 points and 1,461 assists.

== National team career ==
Creus joined Spain's senior national team for the 1983 EuroBasket, where he won the silver medal. He also played with Spain at the 1986 FIBA World Championship.

== Coaching career ==
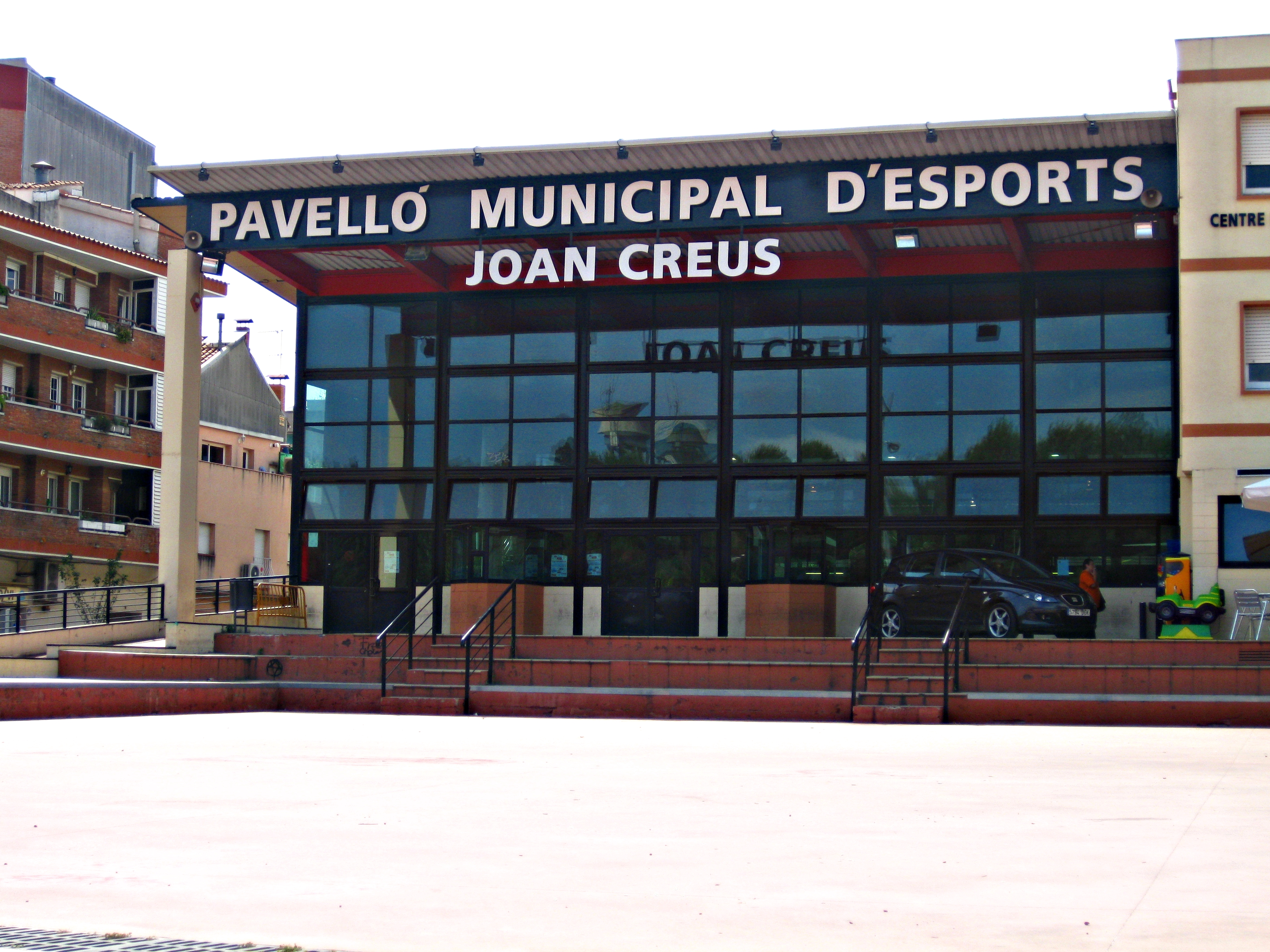
A new arena with his name was opened in his native town.

After his retirement, Creus became an assistant basketball coach for Spain's senior national team, in 2002. With Spain, he won a gold medal at the 2006 FIBA World Championship and two silver medals at the 2003 EuroBasket and the 2007 EuroBasket.

== Executive career ==
Creus left the Spanish national team in 2008, to become the general manager of the professional club basketball team FC Barcelona. Eight years later, in June 2016, Creus resigned from that position.

== Personal life ==
His son, Joan, is also a professional basketball player. In 2015, he played in the Liga ACB with Estudiantes Madrid.

== Honors and awards ==
=== With Manresa ===
- Liga ACB: (1) 1998
- Copa del Rey: (1) 1996

=== With Barcelona ===
- Liga Nacional: (1) 1981
- Copa del Rey: (2) 1981, 1982
