= 1980–81 FIBA Korać Cup =

- League: FIBA Korać Cup
- Sport: Basketball

Final
- Champions: (Spain) Joventut Freixenet
- Runners-up: (Italy) Carrera Venezia

FIBA Korać Cup seasons
- ← 1979–80 1981–82 →

The 1980–81 FIBA Korać Cup was the tenth edition of FIBA's Korać Cup basketball competition. The Spanish Joventut Freixenet defeated the Italian Carrera Venezia in the final on March 19, 1981 in Barcelona, Spain. This was the first edition of the competition to feature a champion team outside of Italy or Yugoslavia.

== First round ==
Team 1	Agg.	Team 2	1st leg	2nd leg
Vasas (Hungary)	181–158	(Turkey) Karşıyaka	106–81	75–77
Hapoel Haifa (Israel)	198–140	(Greece) Panellinios	102–63	96–77
Ovaltine Hemel Hempstead (England)	200–203	(Spain) Inmobanco	89–98	111–105
Mess (Luxembourg)	164–205	(Belgium) Anderlecht	86–108	78–97
Hapoel Tel Aviv (Israel)	174–159	(Belgium) CEP Fleurus	84–72	90–87
Stade Français (France)	219–170	(Luxembourg) Sparta Bertrange	112–70	107–100

== Second round ==
Team 1	Agg.	Team 2	1st leg	2nd leg
Vasas (Hungary)	174–187	(Greece) Aris	90–97	84–90
Hapoel Haifa (Israel)	184–203	(Italy) Carrera Venezia	95–103	89–100
Orthez (France)	185–154	(Spain) Inmobanco	99–71	86–83
Anderlecht (Belgium)	161–148	(Spain) Cotonificio	94–71	67–77
İstanbul Bankası Yenişehir (Turkey)	132–236	(Israel) Hapoel Tel Aviv	68–109	64–127
Beşiktaş (Turkey)	145–184	(Socialist Federal Republic of Yugoslavia) Zadar	81–96	64–88
Slavia VŠ Praha (Czechoslovakia)	154–163	(Belgium) Sunair Oostende	90–84	64–79
Zbrojovka Brno (Czechoslovakia)	169–151	(France) Stade Français	95–75	74–76
Caen (France)	161–182	(Socialist Federal Republic of Yugoslavia) Partizan	83–84	78–98
AEK (Greece)	159–162	(Belgium) Standard Liège	78–80	81–82
Crvena zvezda (Socialist Federal Republic of Yugoslavia)	157–132	(Greece) Sporting	85–63	72–69

Automatically qualified to round of 16

- (Italy) Ferrarelle Rieti (title holder)
- (Socialist Federal Republic of Yugoslavia) Jugoplastika
- (Soviet Union) Dynamo Moscow
- (Spain) Joventut Freixenet
- (France) ASVEL

== Round of 16 ==
Key to colors
Top place in each group advance to semifinals

=== Group A ===
	Team	Pld	Pts	W	L	PF	PA	PD
1.	(Socialist Federal Republic of Yugoslavia) Crvena zvezda	6	10	4	2	581	536	+45
2.	(Italy) Ferrarelle Rieti	6	10	4	2	528	510	+18
3.	(Belgium) Anderlecht	6	8	2	4	495	523	−28
4.	(Israel) Hapoel Tel Aviv	6	8	2	4	542	577	−35

=== Group B ===
	Team	Pld	Pts	W	L	PF	PA	PD
1.	(Spain) Joventut Freixenet	6	10	4	2	459	458	+1
2.	(Socialist Federal Republic of Yugoslavia) Partizan	6	9	3	3	550	509	+41
3.	(Belgium) Sunair Oostende	6	9	3	3	492	526	−34
4.	(France) ASVEL	6	8	2	4	506	514	−8

=== Group C ===
	Team	Pld	Pts	W	L	PF	PA	PD
1.	(Italy) Carrera Venezia	6	12	6	0	609	534	+75
2.	(Czechoslovakia) Zbrojovka Brno	6	8	2	4	587	582	+5
3.	(Socialist Federal Republic of Yugoslavia) Jugoplastika	6	8	2	4	576	588	−12
4.	(Greece) Aris	6	8	2	4	527	595	−68

=== Group D ===
	Team	Pld	Pts	W	L	PF	PA	PD
1.	(Soviet Union) Dynamo Moscow	6	11	5	1	640	614	+26
2.	(France) Orthez	6	10	4	2	604	586	+18
3.	(Socialist Federal Republic of Yugoslavia) Zadar	6	8	2	4	615	611	+4
4.	(Belgium) Standard Liège	6	7	1	5	547	595	−48

== Semi finals ==
Team 1	Agg.	Team 2	1st leg	2nd leg
Joventut Freixenet (Spain)	191–158	(Socialist Federal Republic of Yugoslavia) Crvena zvezda	109–85	82–73
Carrera Venezia (Italy)	220–208	(Soviet Union) Dynamo Moscow	119–104	101–104

== Final ==
March 19, Palau Blaugrana, Barcelona

Team 1	Score	Team 2
Carrera Venezia (Italy)	104–105 OT (92-92)	(Spain) Joventut Freixenet

1980–81 FIBA Korać Cup Champions

Joventut Freixenet
1st title
