= Reggie Johnson (basketball, born 1957) =

American basketball player

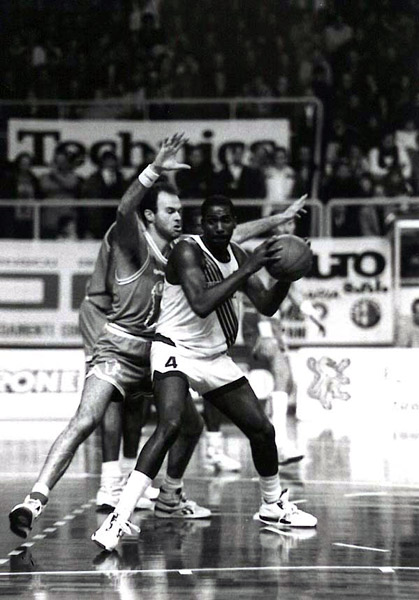
- image of Johnson playing basketball

Personal information
- Born: June 25, 1957 (age 69) Atlanta, Georgia, U.S.
- Listed height: 6 ft 9 in (2.06 m)
- Listed weight: 205 lb (93 kg)

Career information
- High school: Cedar Grove (Ellenwood, Georgia)
- College: Tennessee (1976–1980)
- NBA draft: 1980: 1st round, 15th overall pick
- Drafted by: San Antonio Spurs
- Playing career: 1980–1995
- Position: Power forward / center
- Number: 32, 44, 33

Career history
- 1980–1981: San Antonio Spurs
- 1981–1982: Cleveland Cavaliers
- 1982–1983: Kansas City Kings
- 1983: Philadelphia 76ers
- 1983–1984: New Jersey Nets
- 1984–1986: Marr Rimini
- 1986–1990: Joventut Badalona
- 1990–1991: Birra Messina Trapani
- 1991–1995: León

Career highlights
- NBA champion (1983); 2× Spanish Supercup champion (1986, 1987); 2× First-team All-SEC (1979, 1980); Second-team All-SEC (1978)

Career NBA statistics
- Points: 2,564 (8.4 ppg)
- Rebounds: 1,238 (4.1 rpg)
- Assists: 262 (0.9 apg)
- Stats at NBA.com
- Stats at Basketball Reference

Reginald Johnson (born June 25, 1957) is an American former professional basketball player.

A 6'9" power forward/center from the University of Tennessee, Johnson played four seasons (1980–1984) in the National Basketball Association as a member of the San Antonio Spurs, Cleveland Cavaliers, Kansas City Kings, Philadelphia 76ers and New Jersey Nets. He averaged 8.4 points per game in his NBA career and won a league championship with Philadelphia in 1983. In February 2009, he was named to the University of Tennessee's "All-Century" Basketball team, which includes the 20 greatest players in school history.

== Career statistics ==
Legend
GP	Games played	GS	Games started	MPG	Minutes per game
FG%	Field goal percentage	3P%	3-point field goal percentage	FT%	Free throw percentage
RPG	Rebounds per game	APG	Assists per game	SPG	Steals per game
BPG	Blocks per game	PPG	Points per game	**Bold**	Career high
†	Won an NBA championship

=== NBA ===
==== Regular season ====
Year	Team	GP	GS	MPG	FG%	3P%	FT%	RPG	APG	SPG	BPG	PPG
1980–81	San Antonio	**79**		21.7	.499	.000	.663	4.5	**1.0**	**.6**	.6	10.2
1981–82	San Antonio	21	17	24.0	.485	–	**.800**	**6.5**	**1.0**	.3	.8	10.5
1981–82	Cleveland	23	**22**	**26.8**	.537	–	.795	5.4	**1.0**	.3	.7	9.7
1981–82	Kansas City	31	9	25.3	**.556**	.000	.708	6.1	**1.0**	**.6**	**.9**	**12.2**
1982–83	Kansas City	50	0	19.8	.501	**.250**	.730	4.0	**1.0**	.4	.5	8.6
1982–83†	Philadelphia	29	8	18.9	.448	–	.733	3.1	.8	.3	.6	5.5
1983–84	New Jersey	72	4	11.4	.496	.000	.730	1.9	.6	.3	.3	4.8
Career		305	60	19.6	.505	.143	.716	4.1	.9	.4	.6	8.4

==== Playoffs ====
Year	Team	GP	MPG	FG%	3P%	FT%	RPG	APG	SPG	BPG	PPG
1981	San Antonio	**7**	**32.0**	.479	–	.760	**4.9**	**2.3**	**.6**	**.7**	**12.7**
1983†	Philadelphia	5	6.4	**.500**	–	**1.000**	.0	.6	.2	.0	1.2
1984	New Jersey	**7**	2.4	.000	–	.833	.7	.0	.0	.1	.7
Career		19	14.4	.457	–	.788	2.1	1.0	.3	.3	5.3
