= Joventut Badalona =

Spanish basketball team

- Leagues: Liga ACB; Champions League
- Founded: 1930; 96 years ago
- History: Penya Spirit of Badalona (1930–1932); Centre Esportiu Badaloní (1932–1939); Club Juventud de Badalona (1939–1978); Club Joventut de Badalona (1978–present)
- Arena: Pavelló Olímpic
- Capacity: 12,500
- Location: Badalona, Catalonia, Spain
- Team colors: Green and black
- President: Juan Antonio Morales
- Head coach: Daniel Miret
- Championships: 1 EuroLeague; 1 EuroCup; 2 FIBA Korać Cup; 1 FIBA EuroChallenge; 4 Spanish Championship; 8 King Cup; 3 Spanish Supercup
- Retired numbers: 3 (5, 7, 8)
- Website: Official website
Home	Away

ante to

Club Joventut Badalona, S.A.D. (Catalan pronunciation: [ˈklub ʒuβənˈtud bəðəˈlonə]) is a Spanish professional basketball club based in Badalona, Catalonia, Spain, playing in the Liga ACB and the FIBA Champions League. Known to their fans as La Penya (in English, The Club), it is one of only two teams that have never been relegated from the top division of the Spanish League. The only other is Real Madrid.

It is one of the most prestigious basketball clubs in Spain. Its trophy cabinet includes eight Basketball King's Cup, three Prince of Asturias Cup, three Spanish Super Cups, and four league titles at the domestic level, two of which were won during the current ACB era. At international level, Juventut has won an EuroLeague title—the top continental club competition—won in 1994 after defeating Olympiacos in the final; two Korać Cups, a ULEB Cup, and a FIBA EuroCup.

Well-known players have included the Margall brothers (with Josep Maria Margall), Zoran Slavnić, Jordi Villacampa, Rafael Jofresa, Corny Thompson, Mike Smith, Reggie Johnson, Harold Pressley, Tanoka Beard, Andre Turner, Raül López, Rudy Fernández, Ricky Rubio, Pau Ribas, Demond Mallet, Nicolás Laprovittola, Joel Parra, Andrés Feliz and Ante Tomic.

== History ==
=== Early years ===
Badalona has had a basketball team since 30 March 1930, when Joventut was founded as Penya Spirit of Badalona. Apart from basketball, the club initially had teams involved in several sports including cycling, table tennis, and football. In 1932, the club changed its name to Centre Esportiu Badaloní and in 1939, it was forced to become Club Juventud de Badalona. By 1940, basketball was established as the club's main sport and green and black were adopted as the club's colours.

As one of the founding clubs of the Spanish league, Joventut became also one of the top teams in Spain since the 1950s, developing a great rivalry with Real Madrid and with the other neighbouring teams like FC Barcelona, playing memorable duels. Joventut won their first Spanish Cup in 1948 and their two first leagues in 1967 and 1978.

In 1981, Joventut started its golden era by winning their first European title: the FIBA Korać Cup in 1981, by defeating Carrera Venezia in the final played in Barcelona by 105–104 after a game winning shot by Joe Galvin at the buzzer. Joventut repeated title in 1990, this time beating Scavolini Pesaro in the double-legged final.

=== 1991-present ===
One year later, in 1991, Joventut achieved their third league, the first under the ACB and repeated title in the following season, after losing the final of the FIBA European League against Partizan, that won thanks to a buzzer beater of Saša Đorđević. However, in 1994, Joventut won the title after winning the Final Four played in Tel Aviv against Olympiacos with Zeljko Obradovic as coach.

After two years of decline, Joventut clinched their seventh national cup and in the 2000s, started a new golden era with players like Rudy Fernández, and Ricky Rubio developed in the youth teams of the club. During their years at Badalona, Joventut won a FIBA Europe Cup in 2006, by beating Khimki in the final, a ULEB Cup in 2008, beating Akasvayu Girona in the finals, and the eighth Copa del Rey, also in 2008.

Joventut Badalona is one of the only two teams, along with Real Madrid, to have played every year in the top league.

In the 2017–18 season, Joventut was close of the dissolution, but the shareholders voted to save the club. Finally, it could finish the season in the 15th season and avoided the relegation, despite ending in the worst position ever.

Since then, Joventut has returned to the elite of Spanish basketball with several ACB and King's Cup semifinals, also being contenders in the Eurocup.

== Sponsorship naming ==
Club Joventut de Badalona has received diverse trade names along its history. These are the Joventut denominations along the years:

- Juventud Kalso: 1965–1968
- Juventud Nerva: 1968–1971
- Juventud Schweppes: 1971–1977
- Juventud Freixenet: 1977–1978
- Joventut Freixenet: 1978–1981
- Joventut Sony: 1981–1982
- Joventut Fichet: 1982–1983
- Joventut Massana: 1983–1984
- Ron Negrita Joventut: 1984–1987
- Ram Joventut: 1987–1990
- Montigalà Joventut: 1990–1992
- Marbella Joventut: 1992–1993
- 7up Joventut: 1993–1995
- Festina Joventut: 1996–1998
- Pinturas Bruguer Badalona: 1998–2000
- DKV Joventut: 2001–2011
- FIATC Joventut: 2011–2016
- Divina Seguros Joventut: 2016–2019
- Probitas Joventut: 2019–2025
- Asisa Joventut: 2026–present

== Home arenas ==
- Pavelló de la Plana: (1962–72), before 1962, the team played in open air stadiums.
- Pavelló d'Ausiàs March: (1972–91), also known as Pavelló Club Joventut (5,000 seats).
- Palau Olímpic: (1991–present)

== Gallery ==
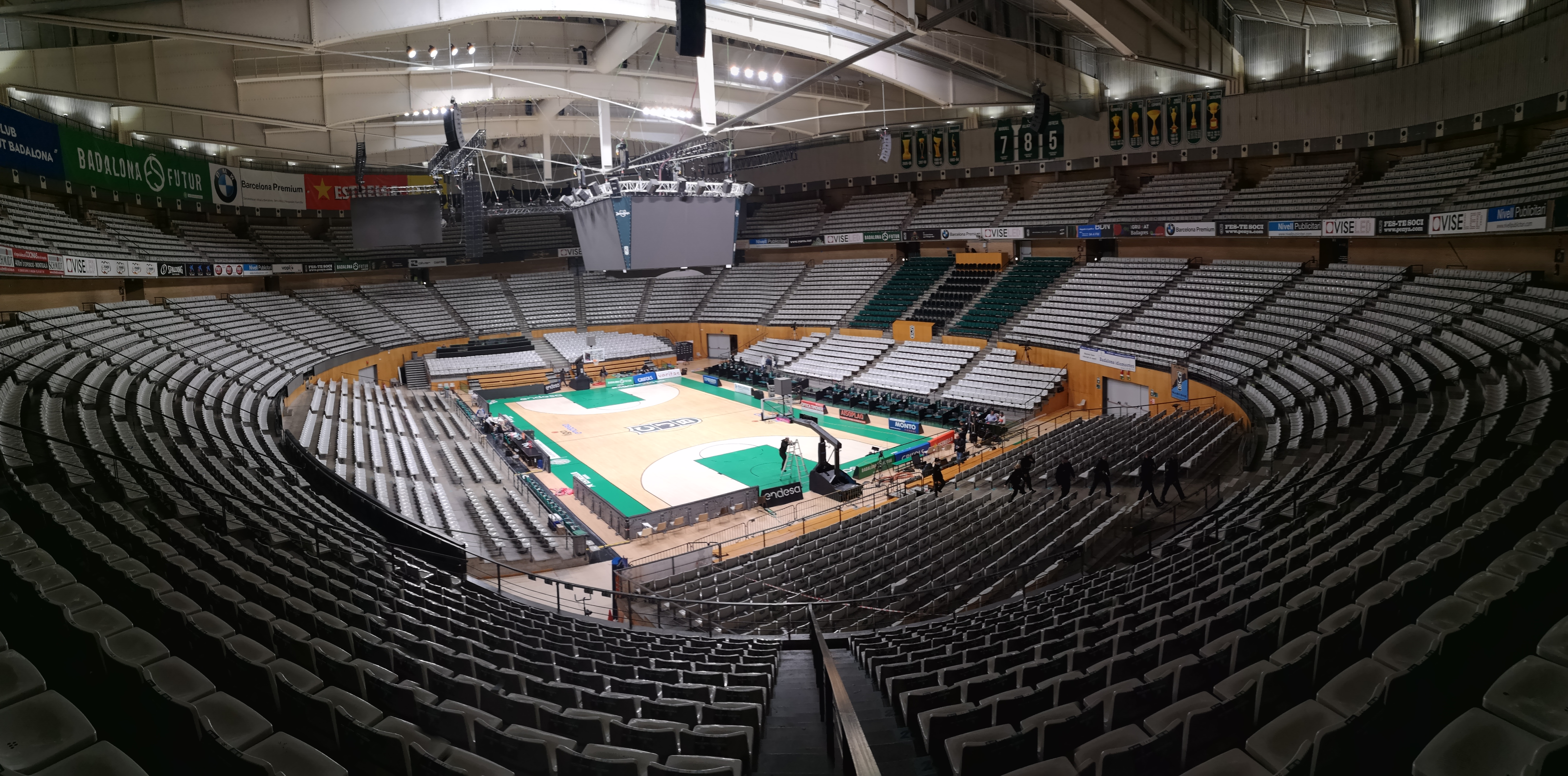
Palau Municipal d'Esports de Badalona

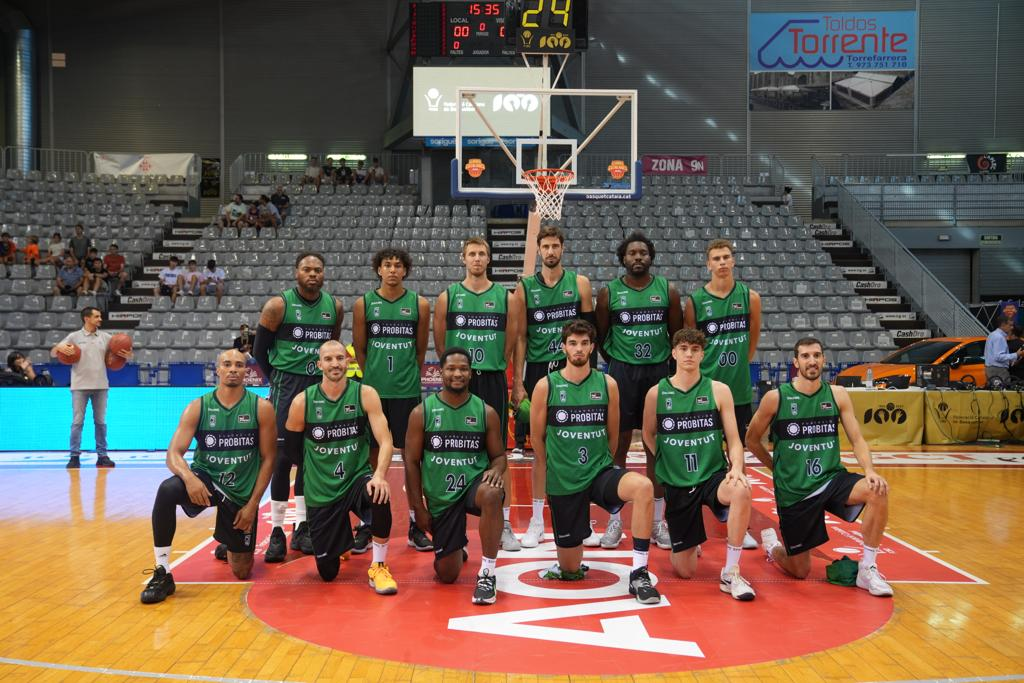
Team 2023

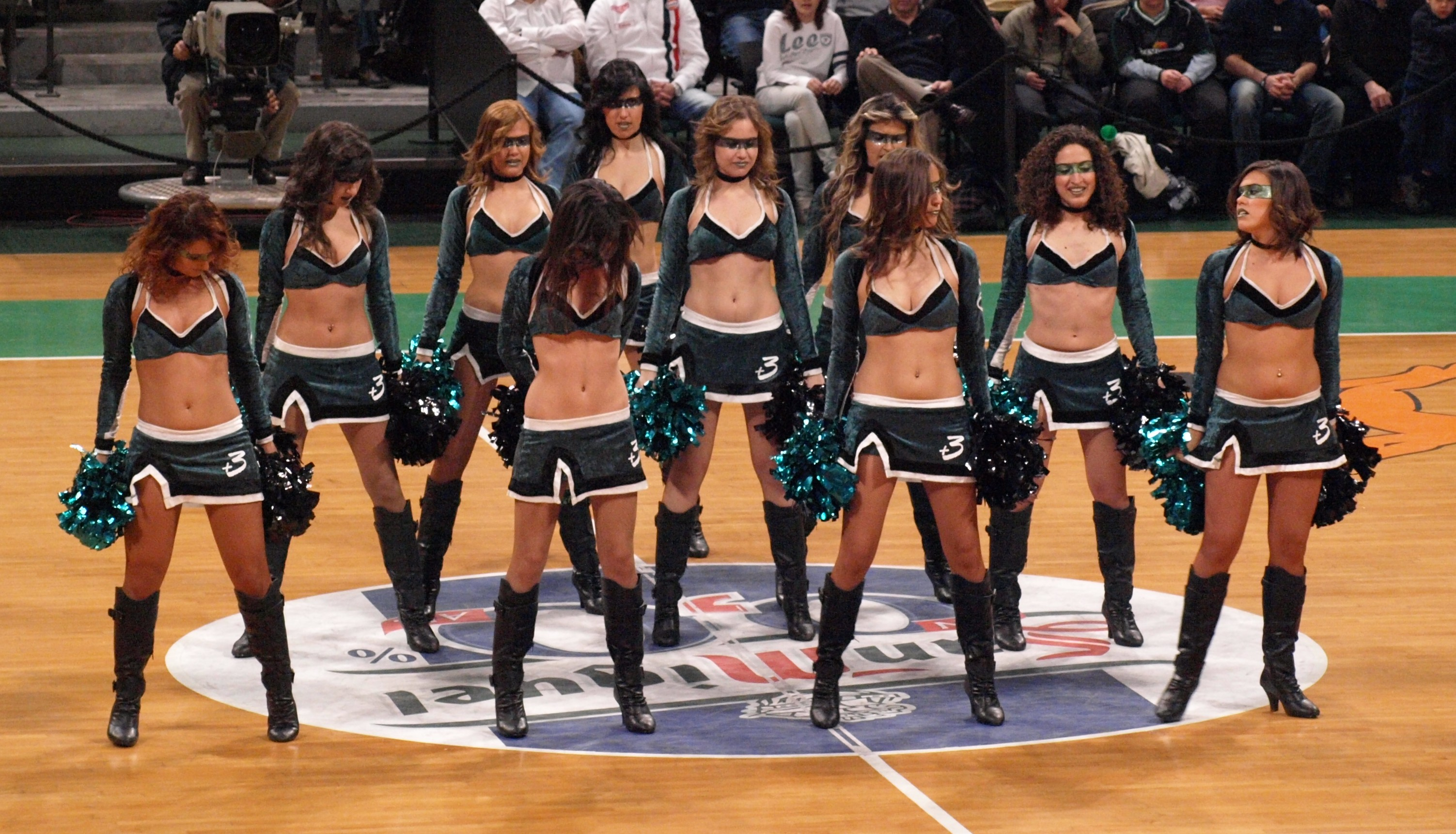
Les Glamcheers

== Players ==
=== Current roster ===
Note: Flags indicate national team eligibility at FIBA-sanctioned events. Players may hold other non-FIBA nationalities not displayed.

Joventut Badalona roster
Players
Coaches

Pos.	No.	Nat.	Name	Ht.	Wt.	Age
SF	1	(Netherlands)	Kraag, Yannick	2.02 m (6 ft 8 in)	94 kg (207 lb)	24 – 16 October 2002
PG	3	(United States)	Ellis, Boogie	1.88 m (6 ft 2 in)	86 kg (190 lb)	25 – 12 December 2000
PG	9	(Spain)	Rubio, Ricky	1.88 m (6 ft 2 in)	86 kg (190 lb)	36 – 21 October 1990
G	10	(Argentina)	Laprovíttola, Nicolás	1.91 m (6 ft 3 in)	82 kg (181 lb)	36 – 31 January 1990
G	12	(Sweden)	Håkanson, Ludvig	1.89 m (6 ft 2 in)	88 kg (194 lb)	30 – 22 March 1996
F/C	13	(Spain)	Osayi, Daniel (Y)	2.06 m (6 ft 9 in)	102 kg (225 lb)	17 – 13 December 2008
F	18	(Spain)	Reyes, Álex	2.02 m (6 ft 8 in)	85 kg (187 lb)	32 – 17 December 1993
G/F	20	(Spain)	Torres, Adrián	2.03 m (6 ft 8 in)	73 kg (161 lb)	20 – 12 September 2006
PF	19	(Bosnia and Herzegovina)	Sulejmanović, Emir	2.06 m (6 ft 9 in)	111 kg (245 lb)	31 – 13 July 1995
PG	31	(Serbia)	Radičević, Nikola	1.96 m (6 ft 5 in)	91 kg (201 lb)	32 – 25 April 1994
SG	32	(Spain)	Nogués, Isaac	1.96 m (6 ft 5 in)	86 kg (190 lb)	22 – 10 February 2004
F	34	(Spain)	Niebla, Diego (Y)	2.02 m (6 ft 8 in)	79 kg (174 lb)	18 – 19 January 2008
C	35	(Sweden)	Birgander, Simon	2.09 m (6 ft 10 in)	94 kg (207 lb)	29 – 23 October 1997
C	44	(Croatia)	Tomić, Ante	2.17 m (7 ft 1 in)	118 kg (260 lb)	39 – 17 February 1987
F/C	55	(United States)	Cheatham, Kwan	2.06 m (6 ft 9 in)	107 kg (236 lb)	31 – 21 August 1995
G/F	77	(Spain)	Mauri, Ferran (Y)	1.90 m (6 ft 3 in)	85 kg (187 lb)	19 – 30 September 2007

Head coach

- (Spanish Basketball Federation) Daniel Miret

Assistant coach(es)

- (Spanish Basketball Federation) Aleix Durán
- (Spanish Basketball Federation) Albert Cañellas

Legend

- (C) Team captain
- (Y) Youth player
- Injured

- Roster
- Transactions
Updated: October 31, 2026

=== Depth chart ===
Pos.	Starting 5	Bench 1	Bench 2	Bench 3
C	Ante Tomić °	Simon Birgander °		Daniel Osayi ‡
PF	Kwan Cheatham *	Emir Sulejmanović †		Diego Niebla ‡
SF	Yannick Kraag †	Álex Reyes †	Adrián Torres †	Ferran Mauri ‡
SG	Nicolás Laprovíttola ^	Isaac Nogués †
PG	Ricky Rubio †	Ludvig Håkanson †	Nikola Radičević †	Boogie Ellis *

Notes: Blue † – homegrown player; (Note: A homegrown player is a player that played for at least three years before the age of 20 on a Spanish team. In Liga ACB, the team must register at least four homegrown players in rosters of 10–12 players or at least three homegrown players in rosters of 8–9 players. In Champions League, the team did not have any limitations regarding the number of homegrown players.) Red * – overseas player; (Note: An overseas player is a player from outside EEA, FIBA Europe or ACP states. In Liga ACB, the team may register at most two overseas players. In Champions League, the team did not have any limitations regarding the number of overseas players.) Purple °; – community player (Note: Comunitarios (loosely translated as "Community players") refers to any player who holds a passport from a country within the European Union (EU), the European Economic Area (EEA), or an associated nation with specific treaties. In Liga ACB, if a European player signs with a Spanish team, they are registered as a Comunitario. Teams can theoretically sign an unlimited number of these players, provided they still satisfy the mandatory homegrown quota (cupos).) Gold ^; – cotonou status player (Note: Cotonou status is a massive roster loophole in European basketball. It allows players from 78 African, Caribbean, and Pacific (ACP) countries to be treated exactly like EU citizens (Comunitarios) for employment purposes. In Liga ACB, a player with a passport from a Cotonou country does not count toward the maximum limit of 2 non-EU imports.) Green ‡ – youth player (Note: In Liga ACB, the team may register under-22 players linked to the youth system. In Champions League, the team may register under-20 players linked to the youth system.)

=== Retired numbers ===
Joventut Badalona retired numbers
N°	Nat.	Player	Position	Tenure
5*	(Spain)	Rafael Jofresa	PG	1986–96, 1997–98, 2000–03
7	(Spain)	Josep Maria Margall	SF	1972–90
8	(Spain)	Jordi Villacampa	SF	1980–97

*Even though number #5 had been retired to honor Rafael Jofresa, from 2002 to 2008 Rudy Fernández kept wearing that number during his stay at the professional team.

=== Notable players ===
Note: Flags indicate national team eligibility at FIBA-sanctioned events. Players may hold other non-FIBA nationalities not displayed.

Criteria

To appear in this section a player must have either:

- Set a club record or won an individual award while at the club
- Played at least one official international match for their national team at any time
- Played at least one official NBA match at any time.

(Spain) Domestic players:

- Rudy Fernández
- Josep Maria Margall
- Tomás Jofresa
- Andrés Jiménez
- Rafa Jofresa
- Raúl López
- Pau Ribas
- Ferran Martinez
- Álex Mumbrú
- Ricky Rubio
- Alberto Abalde
- Pere Tomàs
- Jordi Villacampa
- Albert Oliver
- Sergi Vidal
- Albert Miralles
- Alfonso Martinez
- Gonzalo Sagi-Vela
- Lluis Miquel Santillana
- Joel Parra

(Non-EU players):

- Darryl Middleton
- Maceo Baston
- Tanoka Beard
- Elmer Bennett
- Kyle Guy
- Derek Willis
- Mike Smith
- Reggie Johnson
- Charles Gaines
- Harold Pressley
- Corny Thompson
- Tariq Kirksay
- Andre Turner
- Ed Johnson
- Askia Jones
- Sam Dekker

(European Union) Bosman players:

- Robert Archibald
- Jamie Arnold
- Luboš Bartoň
- Andrew Betts
- Demond Mallet
- Alain Digbeu
- Milan Gurović
- Marcelinho Huertas
- Jan-Hendrik Jagla
- Simas Jasaitis
- Marko Todorovic
- Juan Alberto Espil
- Andrés Feliz
- Nicolas Laprovittola
- Pops Mensah-Bonsu
- Jérôme Moïso
- Henk Norel
- Petar Popović
- Sitapha Savané
- Zoran Slavnić
- Žan Tabak
- Nenad Dimitrijevic
- Arturs Zagars
- Christian Eyenga
- Shawn Dawson
- Goran Suton
- Jerome Jordan
- Ante Tomic

For a complete list of current and former players, see the Joventut Badalona players category.

=== Players at the NBA draft ===
^{#}	Denotes player who has never appeared in an NBA regular-season or playoff game

Position	Player	Year	Round	Pick	Drafted by
PF	(Spain) Albert Miralles	2004	2nd round	39th	Toronto Raptors
SG/SF	(Spain) Rudy Fernández	2007	1st round	24th	Phoenix Suns
PG	(Spain) Ricky Rubio	2009	1st round	5th	Minnesota Timberwolves
PF	(Netherlands) Henk Norel	2009	2nd round	47th	Minnesota Timberwolves
SF	(Democratic Republic of the Congo) Christian Eyenga	2009	1st round	30th	Cleveland Cavaliers

== Head coaches ==
- Xavier Estruch: 1939–1941
- Luis Antoja: 1941–1943
- Gironés: 1943–1944
- Xavier Estruch: 1944–1946
- Vicenç Lleal: 1946–1947
- José Tomas: 1947–1948
- José Vila: 1947–1950
- José Maria Costa: 1950–1951
- José Grau: 1951–1953
- Joaquín Broto: 1953–1955
- J. Jiménez: 1955–1956
- Joaquín Broto: 1956–1958
- Rafael Murgadas: 1958–1959
- José Grau: 1959–1961
- Joan Canals: 1961–1962
- Antonio Molina: 1962–1963
- Albert Gasulla: 1963–1964
- Antonio Molina: 1963–1964
- Eduardo Kucharski: 1965–1969
- Josep Lluís Cortés: 1969–1972
- Clinton Morris: 1972–1973
- Josep Lluís Cortés: 1973–1975
- Eduardo Kucharski: 1975–1976
- Josep María Meléndez: 1975–1977
- Antoni Serra: 1977–1979
- Josep Lluís Cortés: 1979–1980
- Manel Comas: 1980–1982
- Joaquín Costa Prat: 1981–1982
- Jack Schrader: 1982–1983
- Aíto García Reneses: 1983–1985
- Miquel Nolis: 1985–1986
- Alfred Julbe: 1986–1989
- Herb Brown: 1989–1990
- Lolo Sainz: 1990–1993
- Željko Obradović: 1993–1994
- Pedro Martínez: 1994–1995
- Miquel Nolis: 1994–1995
- Zoran Slavnić: 1995–1996
- Alfred Julbe: 1996–2000
- Josep María Izquierdo: 1999–2001
- Manel Comas: 2000–2003
- Aíto García Reneses: 2003–2008
- Sito Alonso: 2008–2010
- Pepu Hernández: 2010–2011
- Salva Maldonado: 2011–2016
- Diego Ocampo: 2016–2018
- Carles Duran: 2018–2024
- Daniel Miret: 2024–present

== Logos ==
Non commercial logo

DKV sponsorship logo

FIATC sponsorship logo

== Uniforms ==
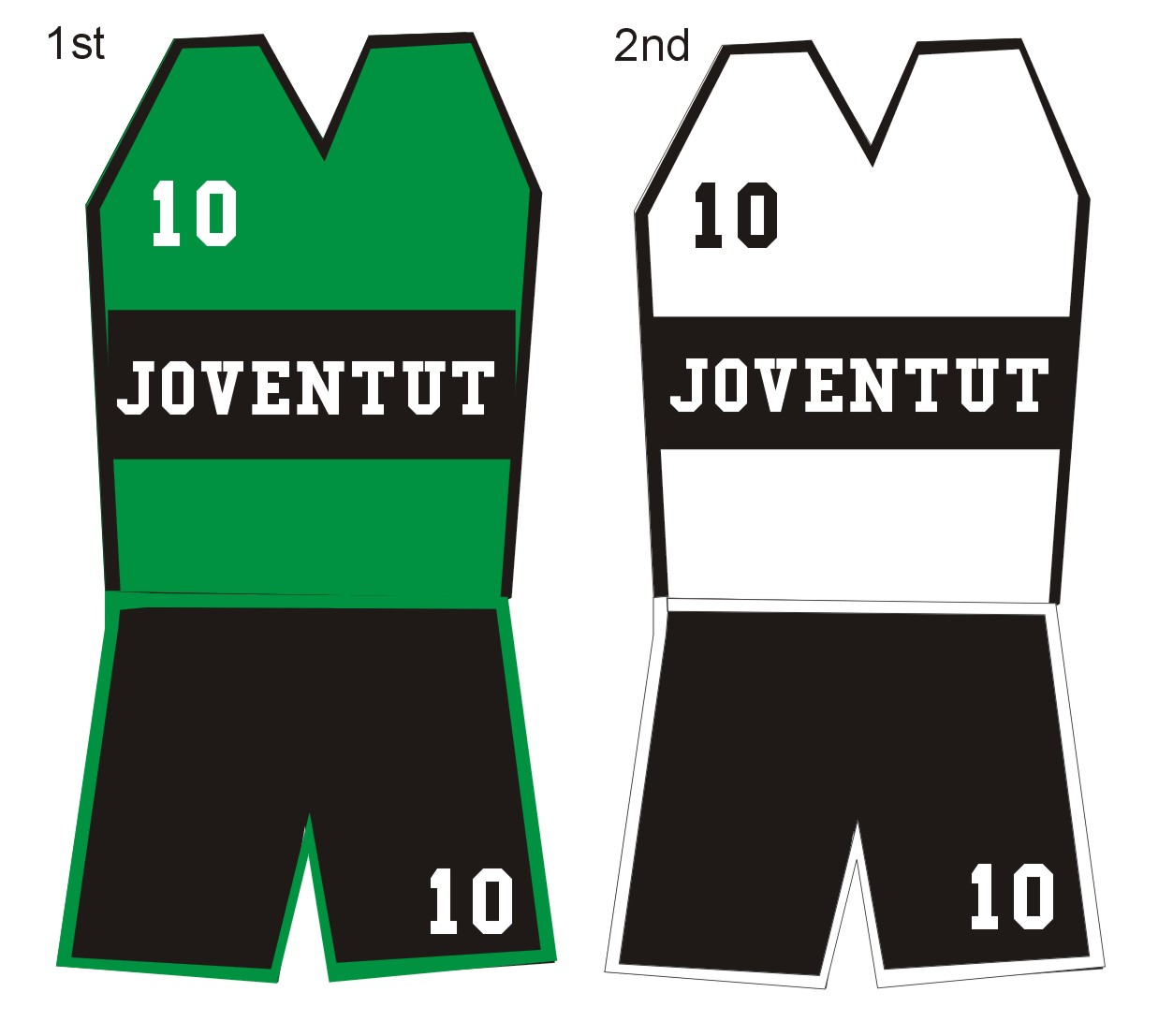
Traditional uniform of Joventut Badalona.

The Joventut jerseys have always been green with a black stripe across the chest, and the shorts have been traditionally black, with the exception of some years that have been green too. The traditional away jerseys have been white, although in 2008–09 a new silver alternate jersey was introduced.

== Rivalries ==
Joventut has a traditional rivalry with provincial neighbours FC Barcelona. Both teams face in the Catalan basketball derby.

== Season by season ==
Season	Tier	Division	Pos.	W–L	Copa del Rey	Other cups		European competitions		
1930–56	Copa del Rey		3 times champion (47–48, 52–53, 54–55), 3 times runner-up (49–50, 51–52, 53–54)							
1956–57	1	1ª División	6th	2–8						
1957–58	1	1ª División	2nd	14–1–3	Champion					
1958–59	1	1ª División	3rd	17–5	Quarterfinalist					
1959–60	1	1ª División	2nd	16–1–5	Semifinalist					
1960–61	1	1ª División	4th	14–8	Quarterfinalist					
1961–62	1	1ª División	2nd	13–5	Quarterfinalist					
1962–63	1	1ª División	3rd	9–7						
1963–64	1	1ª División	3rd	13–9						
1964–65	1	1ª División	3rd	8–6	Semifinalist					
1965–66	1	1ª División	4th	10–8	Runner-up					
1966–67	1	1ª División	1st	18–2	Semifinalist			2 Cup Winners' Cup	QF	5–2
1967–68	1	1ª División	3rd	16–4	Runner-up			1 Champions Cup	GS	5–2
1968–69	1	1ª División	2nd	15–3–4	Champion					
1969–70	1	1ª División	3rd	17–1–4	Runner-up			2 Cup Winners' Cup	QF	4–2
1970–71	1	1ª División	2nd	21–1	Runner-up			2 Cup Winners' Cup	QF	6–2
1971–72	1	1ª División	3rd	17–5	Runner-up			2 Cup Winners' Cup	SF	4–2
1972–73	1	1ª División	2nd	25–2–3	Semifinalist			2 Cup Winners' Cup	SF	5–3
1973–74	1	1ª División	3rd	22–1–5	Runner-up			3 Korać Cup	QF	5–1
1974–75	1	1ª División	3rd	16–1–5	Quarterfinalist			2 Cup Winners' Cup	QF	4–3
1975–76	1	1ª División	3rd	20–12	Champion			3 Korać Cup	SF	5–2
1976–77	1	1ª División	3rd	15–1–6	Semifinalist			2 Cup Winners' Cup	SF	7–5
1977–78	1	1ª División	1st	20–2	Semifinalist			3 Korać Cup	SF	9–1
1978–79	1	1ª División	3rd	16–2–4	Quarterfinalist			1 Champions Cup	SF	8–8
1979–80	1	1ª División	3rd	15–7	Semifinalist			3 Korać Cup	QF	4–4
1980–81	1	1ª División	5th	16–1–9	Semifinalist			3 Korać Cup	C	7–2
1981–82	1	1ª División	5th	15–11	Quarterfinalist			3 Korać Cup	QF	3–3
1982–83	1	1ª División	7th	14–1–11	Quarterfinalist			3 Korać Cup	QF	1–5
1983–84	1	Liga ACB	3rd	24–11	Fourth position					
1984–85	1	Liga ACB	2nd	26–11	Runner-up					
1985–86	1	Liga ACB	3rd	25–8	Runner-up	Supercopa	C	2 Cup Winners' Cup	SF	6–2
1986–87	1	Liga ACB	2nd	29–8	Runner-up	Supercopa	C	2 Cup Winners' Cup	QF	3–3
1986–87	1	Liga ACB	2nd	29–8	Runner-up	Copa Príncipe	C	2 Cup Winners' Cup	QF	3–3
1987–88	1	Liga ACB	4th	21–14	Semifinalist	Supercopa	RU	2 Cup Winners' Cup	RU	8–3
1987–88	1	Liga ACB	4th	21–14	Semifinalist	Copa Príncipe	SF	2 Cup Winners' Cup	RU	8–3
1988–89	1	Liga ACB	3rd	26–16	Semifinalist	Copa Príncipe	C	3 Korać Cup	QF	6–2
1989–90	1	Liga ACB	2nd	29–15	Runner-up			3 Korać Cup	C	11–1–2
1990–91	1	Liga ACB	1st	40–6	Third position	Copa Príncipe	C	3 Korać Cup	SF	9–3
1991–92	1	Liga ACB	1st	36–14	Third position			1 European League	RU	14–4
1992–93	1	Liga ACB	2nd	33–14	Runner-up			1 European League	GS	6–6
1993–94	1	Liga ACB	3rd	24–14	Quarterfinalist			1 European League	C	15–5
1994–95	1	Liga ACB	14th	17–21	Quarterfinalist			1 European League	GS	2–14
1995–96	1	Liga ACB	13th	17–21						
1996–97	1	Liga ACB	4th	24–17	Champion					
1997–98	1	Liga ACB	6th	25–13	Runner-up			2 FIBA EuroCup	R16	10–4
1998–99	1	Liga ACB	10th	18–16	Quarterfinalist			2 Saporta Cup	QF	13–3
1999–00	1	Liga ACB	11th	16–18						
2000–01	1	Liga ACB	14th	11–23						
2001–02	1	Liga ACB	9th	18–16	Quarterfinalist					
2002–03	1	Liga ACB	7th	18–19	Quarterfinalist			2 ULEB Cup	SF	9–7
2003–04	1	Liga ACB	8th	16–21	Runner-up			2 ULEB Cup	QF	8–6
2004–05	1	Liga ACB	7th	21–17				2 ULEB Cup	R16	6–1–5
2005–06	1	Liga ACB	4th	28–14	Quarterfinalist			3 FIBA EuroCup	C	13–3
2006–07	1	Liga ACB	4th	28–16	Semifinalist	Supercopa	SF	1 Euroleague	T16	8–12
2007–08	1	Liga ACB	3rd	27–12	Champion			2 ULEB Cup	C	16–1
2008–09	1	Liga ACB	5th	23–12	Quarterfinalist	Supercopa	SF	1 Euroleague	RS	4–6
2009–10	1	Liga ACB	11th	15–19	Quarterfinalist			2 Eurocup	L16	8–4
2010–11	1	Liga ACB	13th	14–20	Quarterfinalist					
2011–12	1	Liga ACB	11th	16–18						
2012–13	1	Liga ACB	11th	16–18						
2013–14	1	Liga ACB	9th	16–18						
2014–15	1	Liga ACB	7th	19–17	Semifinalist					
2015–16	1	Liga ACB	13th	13–21						
2016–17	1	Liga ACB	14th	11–21						
2017–18	1	Liga ACB	15th	12–22				3 Champions League	QR2	2–1–1
2018–19	1	Liga ACB	7th	18–18	Semifinalist					
2019–20	1	Liga ACB	12th	11–17				2 EuroCup	T16	8–8
2020–21	1	Liga ACB	7th	21–18				2 EuroCup	QF	12–5
2021–22	1	Liga ACB	3rd	25–16	Quarterfinalist			2 EuroCup	EF	12–5
2022–23	1	Liga ACB	4th	22–18	Semifinalist	Supercopa	SF	2 EuroCup	SF	15–6
2023–24	1	Liga ACB	10th	16–18				2 EuroCup	QF	11–9
2024–25	1	Liga ACB	6th	20–16	Quarterfinalist			2 EuroCup	RS	7–11
2025–26	1	Liga ACB	3rd	24–16	Quarterfinalist			3 Champions League	QF	11–4
2026–27	1	Liga ACB				Supercopa	C	3 Champions League		

== Honours ==
=== Domestic competitions ===
- Spanish League

Winners (4): 1966–67, 1977–78, 1990–91, 1991–92
Runners-up (10): 1958, 1959–60, 1961–62, 1968–69, 1970–71, 1972–73, 1984–85, 1986–87, 1989–90, 1992–93

- Spanish Cup

Winners (8): 1948, 1953, 1955, 1958, 1969, 1976, 1997, 2008
Runners-up (13): 1966, 1968, 1970, 1971, 1972, 1974, 1985, 1986, 1987, 1990, 1993, 1998, 2004

- Spanish Super Cup

Winners (3): 1986, 1987, 2026
Runners-up (1): 1988

- Liga de Verano ACB

Winners (2): 1997 (Ι), 1997 (ΙΙ)

=== European competitions ===
- EuroLeague

Winners (1): 1993–94
Runners-up (1): 1991–92
Final Four (2): 1992, 1994

- FIBA Saporta Cup (defunct)

Runners-up (1): 1987–88
Semifinalists (4): 1971–72, 1972–73, 1976–77, 1985–86

- FIBA Korać Cup (defunct)

Winners (2): 1980–81, 1989–90
Semifinalist (3): 1975–76, 1977–78, 1990–91

- EuroCup Basketball

Winners (1): 2007–08
Semifinalists (2): 2002–03, 2022-23

- FIBA Eurocup (defunct)

Winners (1): 2005–06

- European Basketball Club Super Cup (semi-official, defunct)

Runners-up (2): 1990, 1991
3rd place (1): 1987

=== Worldwide competitions ===
- McDonald's Championship (defunct)

Runners-up (1): 1991

=== Other competitions ===
- FIBA International Christmas Tournament (defunct)

Runners-up (3): 1967, 1970, 1978

- Vielha, Spain Invitational Game

Winners (1): 2014

=== Regional competitions ===
- Catalan League

Winners (11): 1986, 1987, 1988, 1990, 1991, 1992, 1994, 1998, 2005, 2007, 2008
Runners-up (14): 1981, 1982, 1984, 1985, 1993, 1995, 1997, 1999, 2001, 2009, 2010, 2011, 2012, 2013

- Catalan Championship (defunct)

Winners (5): 1949, 1952, 1953, 1954, 1957
Runners-up (5): 1948, 1950, 1951, 1955, 1957

== Individual awards ==
ACB Most Valuable Player

- Tanoka Beard – 2002
- Nicolás Laprovitola - 2018/19

Liga Nacional 1ra Div Top Scorer

- Alfonso Martinez(22.1pts) - 1966/67

ACB top scorer

- Rudy Fernández(21.2pts) - 2007/08
- Nicolás Laprovitola(17.2pts) - 2018/19
- Klement Prepelic(22.3pts) -2019/20

ACB Rising Star/Best Young Player

- Ricky Rubio – 2007
- Guillem Vives – 2014

ACB Finals MVP

- Corny Thompson – 1991
- Mike Smith – 1992

Spanish Cup MVP

- Andre Turner – 1997
- Rudy Fernández – 2004, 2008

ULEB Eurocup Finals MVP

- Rudy Fernández – 2008

EuroChallenge Final Four MVP

- Rudy Fernández – 2006

EuroLeague Rising Star

- Rudy Fernández – 2007

All-ACB Team

- Rudy Fernández – 2007, 2008
- Ricky Rubio – 2008
- Nicolás Laprovittola – 2019
- Klemen Prepelič – 2020
- Xabier López-Arostegui – 2021

ACB Slam Dunk Champion

- Christian Eyenga – 2009

== Wheelchair basketball ==
Joventut Badalona has also a wheelchair basketball team which currently plays in the División de Honor, the Spanish top league.

In 2011 the team, which was known as Joventut GAM by sponsorship reasons, was dissolved and two years later was re-launched again. In its first season after the re-opening, the team promoted to División de Honor.

=== Season by season ===
Season	Tier	League	Pos	Copa del Rey
2001–02	1	Div. Honor	6th	
2002–03	1	Div. Honor	7th	
2003–04	1	Div. Honor	13th	
2004–05	2	1ª División	1st	
2005–06	1	Div. Honor	9th	Quarterfinalist
2006–07	1	Div. Honor	9th	
2007–08	1	Div. Honor	11th	
2008–09	2	Div. Honor B	1st	
2009–10	1	Div. Honor	8th	
2010–11	1	Div. Honor	12	
2011–13	Did not enter any competition			
2013–14	2	1ª División	1st	
2014–15	1	Div. Honor	10th	
2015–16	1	Div. Honor	11th	
2016–17	2	1ª División	4th	
2017–18	Did not enter any competition			
2018–19	2	1ª División	6th	
2019–20	2	1ª División	5th	

== See also ==
- 1991 McDonald's Championship
