= Andrés Jiménez (basketball) =

Spanish basketball player

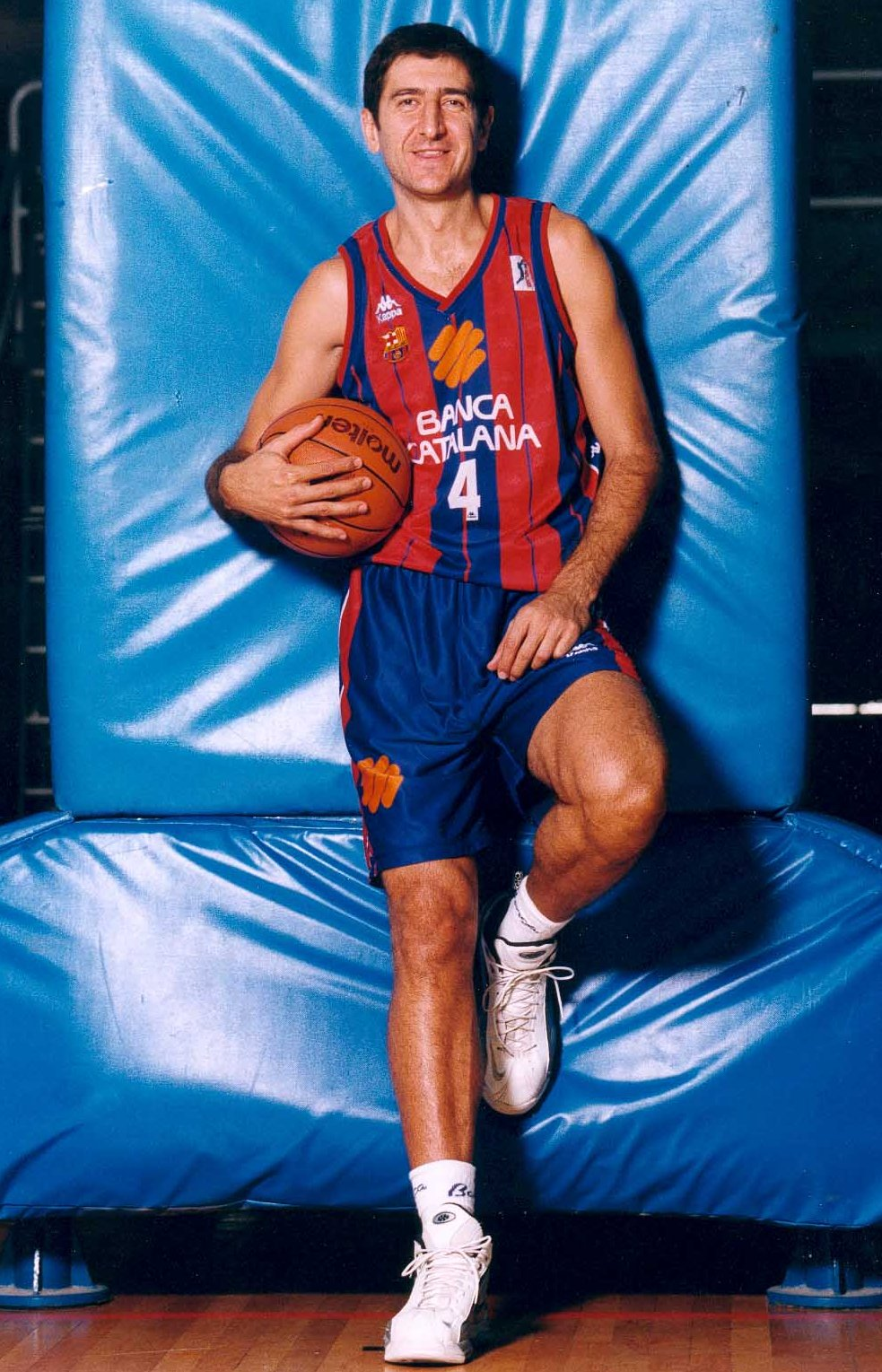
- Jiménez with Barça in the 1996-97 season

Personal information
- Born: June 6, 1962 (age 64) Carmona, Spain
- Listed height: 6 ft 8.75 in (2.05 m)
- Listed weight: 200 lb (91 kg)

Career information
- NBA draft: 1984: undrafted
- Playing career: 1978–1998
- Position: Power forward
- Number: 15

Career history
- 1978–1983: Círcol Catòlic
- 1983–1986: Joventut Badalona
- 1986–1998: FC Barcelona

Career highlights
- FIBA Europe SuperCup champion (1986); FIBA Korać Cup champion (1987); 7× Spanish League champion (1987–1989, 1990, 1995–1997); 4× Spanish King's Cup winner (1987, 1988, 1991, 1994); Spanish Prince's Cup winner (1988); No. 4 retired by FC Barcelona
Medals
Men's basketball
Representing Spain
Summer Olympic Games
| Silver medal – second place | 1984 Los Angeles |
EuroBasket
| Silver medal – second place | 1983 France |
European Championship for Cadets
| Bronze medal – third place | 1979 Syria | Under-16 Team |

Andrés Jiménez Fernández (born 6 June 1962) is a Spanish former professional basketball player. At a height of 2.05 m (6'8 3/4") tall, he played at the power forward position.

== Professional career ==
Jiménez started with Joventut Badalona and in 1986 FC Barcelona Bàsquet of the Spanish top-tier level Liga ACB acquired him for a fee of 15 million pesetas (90.000 euros). While playing with FC Barcelona, he won the 1986–87 season's FIBA Korać Cup title. His number 4 jersey was retired by FC Barcelona.

== National team career ==
Jiménez also played for Spain's senior national team at the 1984 Summer Olympics, where they won a silver medal, at the 1988 Summer Olympic Games, and at the 1992 Summer Olympic Games.

He also played with Spain at 4 FIBA World Cups: (1982, 1986, 1990 and 1994). He totaled 33 games played and 345 points (10.5 ppg.) scored during those competitions.

Jiménez also played at 4 EuroBaskets:1983, where he won a silver medal, 1985 and 1987 4th place and 1989 5th. He totaled 27 games played and 377 points (14.0 ppg.) scored during those competitions.
