= Palau dels Esports de Barcelona =

Multi-purpose indoor arena in Barcelona Province, Spain

Barcelona Teatre Musical
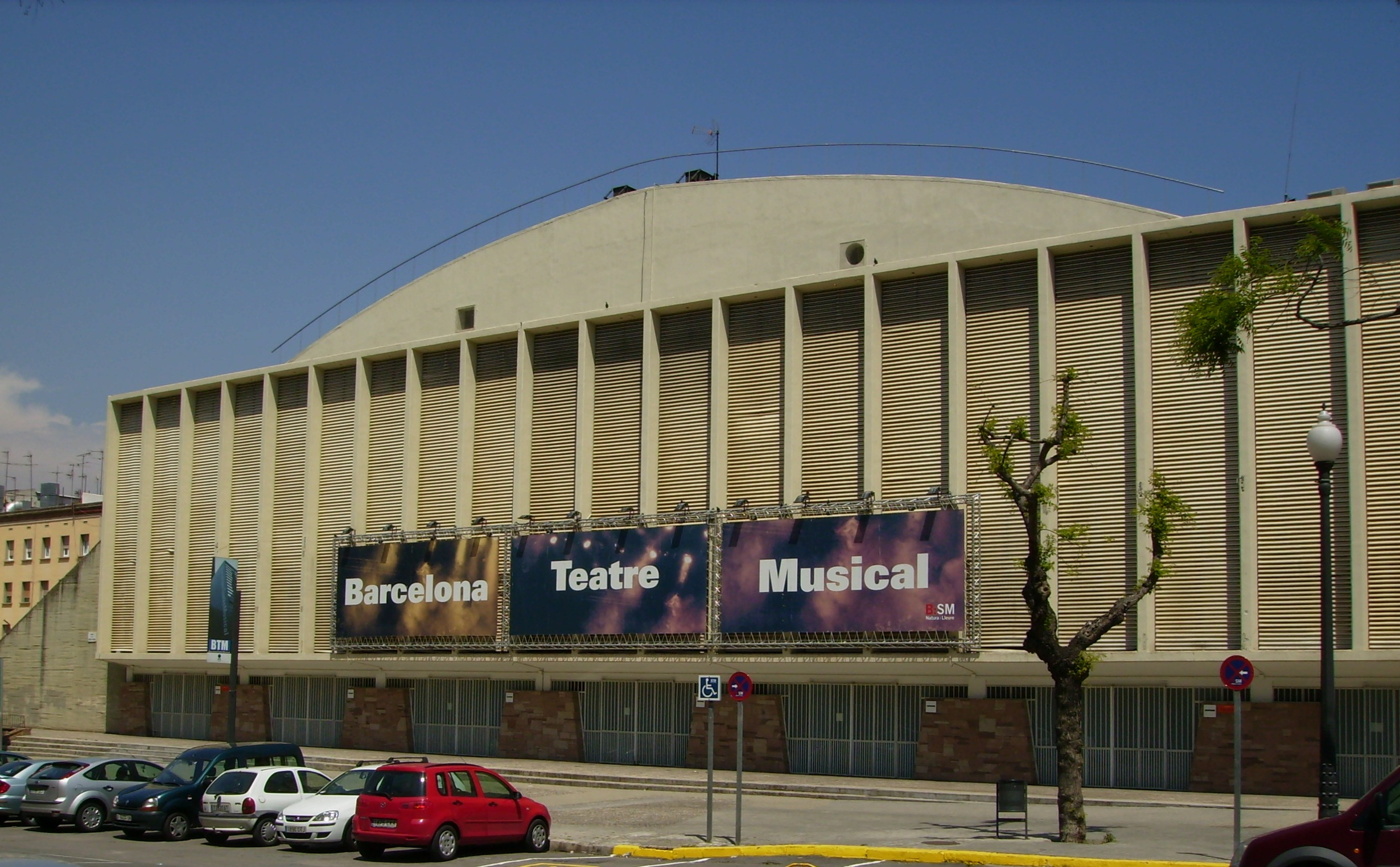
- Interactive map of Barcelona Teatre Musical
- Former names: Palau dels Esports de Barcelona (1955–2000)
- Location: Barcelona, Catalonia, Spain
- Coordinates: 41°22′17.88″N 2°9′18.79″E
- Capacity: 8,000 (1955–1999); 3,500 (2000–present)

Construction
- Opened: 1955
- Renovated: 1986, 2000
- Architects: Josep Soteras (1955); Francesc Labastida (1986)

Tenant
- RCD Espanyol basketball team (1980s)

The Palau dels Esports de Barcelona (Barcelona Sports Palace) is a multi-purpose indoor arena in Barcelona, Catalonia, Spain. It is on Lleida Street on the slopes of Montjuïc, a hill to the south east of the city centre.

The arena is able to host competitions of any indoor sport. In 2000 it was adapted to better accommodate theatre and musical shows and given a new name: Barcelona Teatre Musical. The seating capacity was reduced from 8,000 to 3,500, but comfort and the acoustic quality were enhanced.

== History ==
Inaugurated in 1955 for the Mediterranean Games, it was designed by the architect Josep Soteras.

It was the only indoor arena of its type in Barcelona until 1971 when FC Barcelona inaugurated the Palau Blaugrana. Even after this, the Palau dels Esports continued to be the only indoor arena in public hands: for this reason it continued to host the main sporting, social, cultural and musical events that took place in the city.

During the 1980s it was the home of the RCD Espanyol basketball team, which for several seasons competed in the ACB.

It was remodelled in 1986 by the architect Francesc Labastida for the group E games of the World Basketball Championship of 1986.

At the beginning of the 1990s activity in the arena began to diminish. The basketball team disappeared and in 1990 the Palau Sant Jordi was inaugurated, attracting many of the top events from that date on.

The venue hosted rhythmic gymnastics and the preliminary phase of the volleyball for the 1992 Summer Olympics. This proved to be its sporting swansong, however, and from the mid-1990s it concentrated on hosting drama, music and comedy.

== Notable sporting events ==
- 1955: Mediterranean Games
- 1969: FIBA European Champions Cup final in which CSKA Moscow defeated Real Madrid 103-99 after two overtime periods in front of a 9,000 sellout crowd
- 1973: European Basketball Championship final phase
- 1986: World Basketball Championship semi final round, Group E
- 1992: 1992 Summer Olympics

| Preceded by Palais des Sports de Lyon; Lyon | FIBA European Champions Cup; Final Venue; 1969 | Succeeded by Dvorana Skenderija; Sarajevo |
| Preceded by Grugahalle; Essen | EuroBasket; Final Venue; 1973 | Succeeded by Pionir Hall; Belgrade |
