= Bàsquet Manresa =

- Leagues: Liga ACB; EuroCup
- Founded: 1931; 95 years ago
- History: Manresa Basquetbol Club (1931–1934); Unió Manresana de Bàsquet (1934–1979); Manresa Esportiu Bàsquet (1979–1992); Bàsquet Manresa (1992–present)
- Arena: Nou Congost
- Capacity: 5,000
- Location: Manresa, Spain
- Team colors: Red, blue, white
- President: Josep Maria Herms
- Head coach: Diego Ocampo
- Retired numbers: 4 (7, 9, 10, 15)
- Website: basquetmanresa.com
Home	Away

Club Bàsquet Manresa S.A.D., also known as Kids&Us Manresa for sponsorship reasons, is a professional basketball club based in Manresa, Spain. The team plays in the Liga ACB and the EuroCup Basketball. Its home arena is the Pavelló Nou Congost.

Joan "Chichi" Creus is the team's most decorated player; he was the Spanish Cup Most Valuable Player in 1996, and the ACB Finals MVP two years later. Some others well known players that had played for Bàsquet Manresa are Juan Domingo de la Cruz, Roger Esteller, Derrick Alston, Serge Ibaka, Andrés Nocioni and Rolando Frazer.

== History ==
Bàsquet Manresa was founded in 1931 with the name of Manresa Bàsquetbol Club and merged in 1934 with Club Bàsquet Bages for becoming Unió Manresana de Bàsquet. In 1940, the club wins the Copa Barcelona and integrates in CE Manresa as its basketball section.

In 1968 the club promotes for the first time to the Liga Nacional but is immediately relegated again in its debut season. Two years later, Manresa played again in the top tier and ended the league in the fourth position, thus qualifying for the first time to play the Korać Cup, where it reached the quarterfinals.

In 1979 the club splits from CE Manresa and becomes Manresa Esportiu Bàsquet and grew up until becoming a usual contender in the Liga ACB. With the sponsorship of TDK between 1985 and 2000, the club lived its best years. In 1992, as a professional club and according to the law, Manresa becomes a Sociedad Anónima Deportiva and changes again its name to Bàsquet Manresa. This name change allowed Manresa EB and its former rival CB Manresa to merge definitively.

In 1996, Manresa wins its first national trophy by defeating FC Barcelona in the Copa del Rey played in Murcia. Two years later, and after finishing the regular season in the sixth position and without the home-court advantage in any of the playoffs series, Manresa wins the 1997–98 Liga ACB after eliminating Adecco Estudiantes in the quarterfinals and Real Madrid in the semifinals, for winning in Tau Cerámica Baskonia 3–1 in the finals. As in the Copa del Rey won two years ago, Joan Creus became the MVP of the finals. This achievement is nowadays considered on the biggest surprises in Spanish sport ever.

As league champions, Manresa played the EuroLeague, but was eliminated in the group stage. The golden era of the club suddenly ended in 2000, after the relegation to Liga LEB by losing in the do-or-die match against Gijón Baloncesto, that ended 95–91 after an overtime.

Since its relegation, Manresa started to alternate seasons in ACB and LEB, with two league promotions in 2002 and 2007, as LEB champions. In 2012 and 2013, Manresa suffered two relegations in Liga ACB, but remained in the league due to the impossibility of LEB Oro teams to promote. In 2017, after registering the worst season in the top tier since the 1983–84 season, Manresa relegated to LEB Oro. However, the club achieved promotion just in the next season after beating Club Melilla Baloncesto in the final of the playoffs.

During the 2018–19 ACB season the team returned to the top tier after a one–season absence and the team ended 8th in the standings qualified to the 2019 ACB Playoffs during that season but later they were eliminated by Real Madrid 2–0 in the quarterfinals. Resulting to the great performance during the season, Manresa qualified to the Basketball Champions League for the following 2019–20 season and returned to European competitions after 20 years.

In the 2021–22 season, Manresa made it success in the Basketball Champions League and the team returned after a one-season, which the team reached the 2022 Basketball Champions League Final Four and reached the championship game but however, it was lost to Lenovo Tenerife 98–87 in the final. But they managed to reach the playoffs in the 2022 ACB Playoffs, they reached the quarterfinals but they were eliminated by Real Madrid 2–0 in the series.

In the 2022–23 season, Manresa struggled and finding a way to salvate from regelation. In the end of the season they ended 14th in the standings and out of the playoff bound. Which the team almost collapse in regelation. In the 2022–23 Basketball Champions League season, they managed to reached the quarterfinals but they lost again to Lenovo Tenerife 2–1 which was their matchup in the previous year's final.

In the 2023–24 season, the team returned to its great performance, reaching to the ACB Playoffs after the previous season they didn't reach and the worst position. But later, they were eliminated by Uncaja 2–0 in the quarterfinals. The team did not qualify to 2023–24 Basketball Champions League due to its worst performance despite salvation from regelation from the previous season.

The team will participate in the EuroCup for the following 2025–26 season.

== Sponsorship naming ==
Bàsquet Manresa has several denominations through the years due to its sponsorship:

- Manresa K'ans 1967–1971
- Manresa La Casera 1971–1977
- Icab Manresa 1977–1979
- Marlboro Manresa 1979–1980
- Caixa Manresa 1981–1982, 1984–1985
- Seguros Velázquez Manresa 1982–1983
- Ebro Manresa 1983–1984
- TDK Manresa 1985–2000
- Minorisa.net Manresa 2000–2002

- Ricoh Manresa 2002–2009
- Suzuki Manresa 2009–2010
- Assignia Manresa 2010–2012
- La Bruixa d'Or 2013–2014
- La Bruixa d'Or Manresa 2014–2015
- ICL Manresa 2015–2018
- Baxi Manresa 2018–2026
- Kids&Us Manresa 2026–present

== Logos ==
Non commercial logo

2002–2009

2015–2018

2018–2026

2026–present

== Home arenas ==
- Pavelló Congost (1968–92), before 1968 the team played in outdoor courts next to the football stadium of Pujolet.

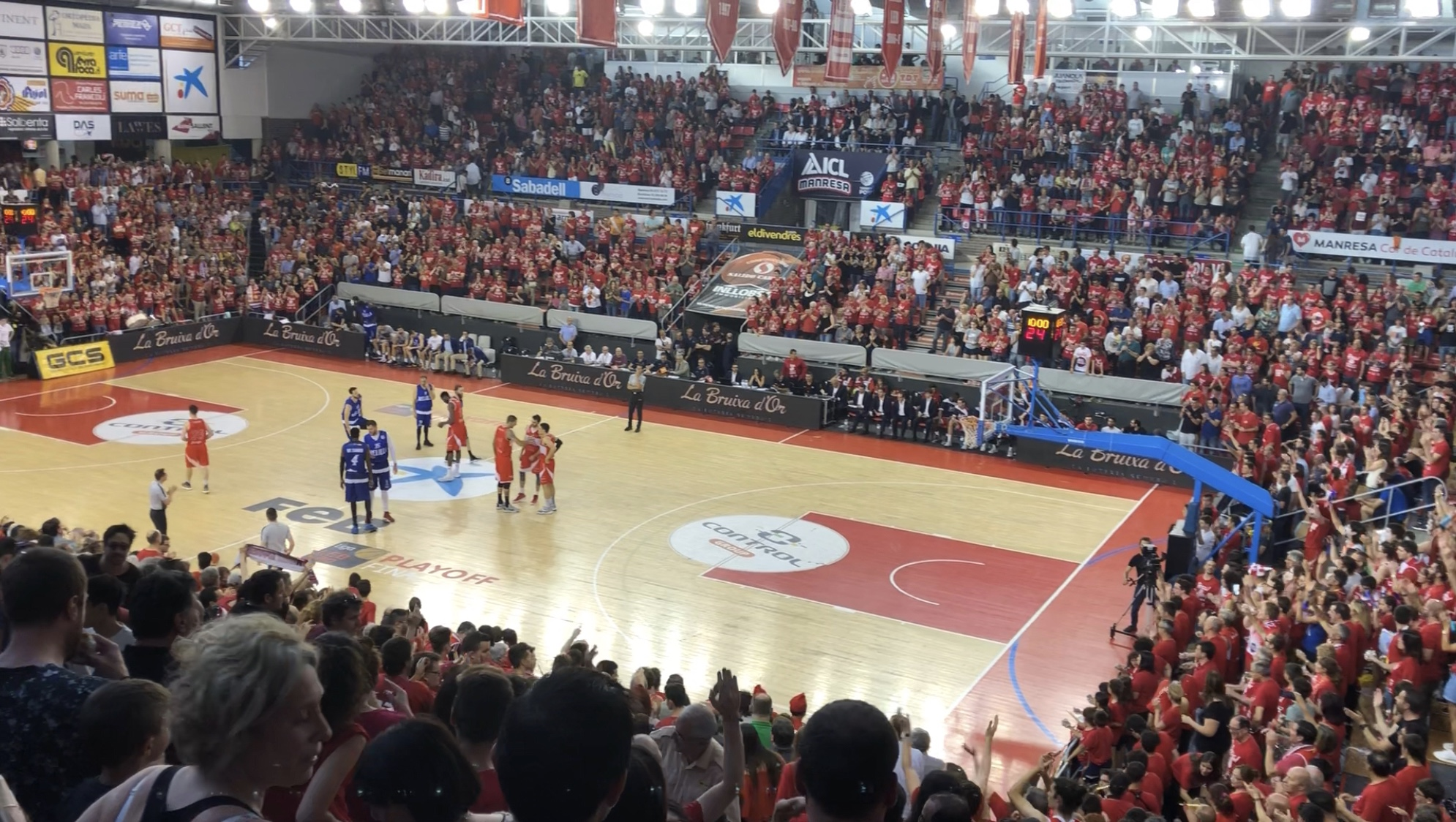
Pavelló Nou Congost

- Pavelló Nou Congost (1992–present)

== Players ==
=== Retired numbers ===
Bàsquet Manresa retired numbers
No	Nat.	Player	Position	Tenure
7	(Spain)	Joan Creus	G	1993–01
9	(Spain)	Joan Peñarroya	SG	1987–90, 1991–97, 2001–03
10	(Spain)	Pep Pujolrás	F	1986–92
15	(Spain)	Jordi Singla	F	1989–92, 1992–04

=== Current roster ===
Note: Flags indicate national team eligibility at FIBA-sanctioned events. Players may hold other non-FIBA nationalities not displayed.

Bàsquet Manresa roster
Players
Coaches

Pos.	No.	Nat.	Name	Ht.	Age
PG	00	(United States)	Notae, JD	1.88 m (6 ft 2 in)	28 – 27 October 1998
F	0	(United States)	Allen, Timmy	1.98 m (6 ft 6 in)	26 – 9 January 2000
SG	1	(Poland)	Kolenda, Łukasz	1.96 m (6 ft 5 in)	27 – 28 July 1999
PG	2	(France)	Benitez, Hugo	1.92 m (6 ft 4 in)	25 – 20 January 2001
F	3	(Slovenia)	Ščuka, Luka	2.08 m (6 ft 10 in)	24 – 23 May 2002
PF	4	(Spain)	Vila, Eric	2.09 m (6 ft 10 in)	28 – 15 May 1998
PG	5	(France)	Beaufort, Lucas	1.93 m (6 ft 4 in)	24 – 24 May 2002
PG	6	(Spain)	Bassas, Ferrán	1.81 m (5 ft 11 in)	34 – 29 April 1992
SF	8	(Spain)	Tamba, Pablo	2.01 m (6 ft 7 in)	23 – 4 September 2003
SF	11	(Nigeria)	Agbo, Chibuzo	2.01 m (6 ft 7 in)	24 – 28 November 2001
C	14	(Canada) (South Africa)	Ongenda, Nick	2.11 m (6 ft 11 in)	26 – 29 September 2000
F/C	29	(Spain)	Oriola, Pierre	2.08 m (6 ft 10 in)	34 – 25 September 1992
PF	33	(The Bahamas)	Mobley, Isaiah	2.06 m (6 ft 9 in)	27 – 24 September 1999
PG	44	(Spain)	Villar, Rafa	1.91 m (6 ft 3 in)	22 – 9 August 2004
PF	91	(Bulgaria)	Minchev, Yordan	2.03 m (6 ft 8 in)	28 – 17 October 1998

Head coach

- (Spanish Basketball Federation) Diego Ocampo

Assistant coach(es)

- (Spanish Basketball Federation) Lluís Riera
- (Spanish Basketball Federation) Carlos Flores
- (Spanish Basketball Federation) Nacho Juan

Legend

- (C) Team captain
- (Y) Youth player
- Injured

- Roster
- Transactions
Updated: November 4, 2026

=== Depth chart ===
Pos.	Starting 5	Bench 1	Bench 2
C	Pierre Oriola †	Nick Ongenda	Luka Ščuka
PF	Yordan Minchev	Eric Vila †	Isaiah Mobley
SF	Timmy Allen *	Pablo Tamba †	Chibuzo Agbo
SG	Hugo Benitez	Łukasz Kolenda	JD Notae *
PG	Ferran Bassas †	Rafa Villar †	Lucas Beaufort

Notes: Blue † – homegrown player; (Note: A homegrown player is a player that played for at least three years before the age of 20 on a Spanish team. In Liga ACB, the team must register at least four homegrown players in rosters of 10–12 players or at least three homegrown players in rosters of 8–9 players. In EuroCup, the team did not have any limitations regarding the number of homegrown players.) Red * – overseas player; (Note: An overseas player is a player from outside EEA, FIBA Europe or ACP states. In Liga ACB, the team may register at most two overseas players. In EuroCup, the team did not have any limitations regarding the number of overseas players.) Green ‡ – youth player (Note: In Liga ACB, the team may register under-22 players linked to the youth system.)

== Head coaches ==
Since 1967:

- Francesc Casé 1967–1968
- Josep Masseguer 1968–1969
- Jeroni Alberola 1969–1970
- Antoni Serra 1970–1977
- Alfonso Martínez 1977–1978
- Joan Martínez 1978
- Josep M. Soler 1978
- Jaume Berenguer 1978–1979
- Joan Basora 1979–1981
- Pere Guiu 1981
- Miguel López Abril 1981
- Jaume Ventura 1981–1984
- Germán González 1984
- Francesc Canellas 1984–1985
- Miquel Bataller 1985
- Juanito Jiménez 1985–1986
- Joan María Gavaldá 1986–1988
- Flor Meléndez 1988–1990
- Ricard Casas 1990, 2001–2005
- Pedro Martínez 1990–1994, 2014–2015, 2019–2024
- Salva Maldonado 1994–1997, 2000–2001
- Luis Casimiro 1997–1999
- Manel Comas 1999–2000
- Xavier García 2005
- Óscar Quintana 2005–2007
- Jaume Ponsarnau 2007–2013
- Borja Comenge 2013–2014
- Pere Romero 2014
- Ibon Navarro 2015–2017
- Aleix Duran 2017–2018
- Diego Ocampo 2018, 2024–
- Joan Peñarroya 2018–2019

== Season by season ==
Season	Tier	Division	Pos.	W–L	Copa del Rey	Other cups		European competitions		
1967–68	2	2ª División	2nd	24–5						
1968–69	1	1ª División	11th	7–16						
1969–70	2	2ª División	1st	19–3						
1970–71	1	1ª División	4th	11–1–10	Semifinalist					
1971–72	1	1ª División	8th	9–13	Quarterfinalist			3 Korać Cup	QF	0–2
1972–73	1	1ª División	7th	14–1–15	Round of 16					
1973–74	1	1ª División	6th	13–2–13	Quarterfinalist					
1974–75	1	1ª División	5th	9–3–10	Semifinalist					
1975–76	1	1ª División	6th	13–19						
1976–77	1	1ª División	9th	8–1–13	First round					
1977–78	1	1ª División	5th	9–1–12	Quarterfinalist					
1978–79	1	1ª División	7th	10–12	Round of 16					
1979–80	1	1ª División	6th	10–12	Runner-up					
1980–81	1	1ª División	8th	10–1–15	Semifinalist					
1981–82	1	1ª División	7th	13–13	Round of 16					
1982–83	1	1ª División	9th	10–16	Round of 16					
1983–84	1	Liga ACB	16th	5–23						
1984–85	2	1ª División B	3rd	17–9						
1985–86	1	Liga ACB	10th	14–16		Copa Príncipe	QF			
1986–87	1	Liga ACB	10th	14–17		Copa Príncipe	RU			
1987–88	1	Liga ACB	15th	17–16		Copa Príncipe	QF	3 Korać Cup	R2	1–1
1988–89	1	Liga ACB	20th	18–22	Round of 16					
1989–90	1	Liga ACB	22nd	17–16	Round of 16					
1990–91	1	Liga ACB	18th	18–20	Quarterfinalist					
1991–92	1	Liga ACB	13th	17–23	First round					
1992–93	1	Liga ACB	13th	16–18	Quarterfinalist					
1993–94	1	Liga ACB	7th	22–12	Second round					
1994–95	1	Liga ACB	4th	23–21	Second round			3 Korać Cup	GS	6–4
1995–96	1	Liga ACB	4th	28–18	Champion			3 Korać Cup	GS	5–5
1996–97	1	Liga ACB	8th	19–18	Quarterfinalist			2 EuroCup	R16	7–7
1997–98	1	Liga ACB	1st	30–16	Semifinalist			3 Korać Cup	R32	5–3
1998–99	1	Liga ACB	11th	16–18				1 Euroleague	GS	5–11
1999–00	1	Liga ACB	17th	11–23						
2000–01	2	LEB	3rd	26–12		Copa Príncipe	RU			
2001–02	2	LEB	2nd	32–1–8		Copa Príncipe	SF			
2002–03	1	Liga ACB	13th	15–19						
2003–04	1	Liga ACB	9th	16–18	Quarterfinalist					
2004–05	1	Liga ACB	13th	12–22						
2005–06	1	Liga ACB	17th	12–22						
2006–07	2	LEB	1st	26–15						
2007–08	1	Liga ACB	11th	14–20						
2008–09	1	Liga ACB	11th	14–18						
2009–10	1	Liga ACB	12th	14–20						
2010–11	1	Liga ACB	15th	10–24						
2011–12	1	Liga ACB	12th	15–19						
2012–13	1	Liga ACB	18th (Note: Remained in ACB after Ford Burgos and Lucentum Alicante did not complete the requirements for joining the league.)	6–28						
2013–14	1	Liga ACB	17th (Note: Remained in ACB after Ford Burgos did not complete the requirements for joining the league.)	7–27						
2014–15	1	Liga ACB	16th	11–23						
2015–16	1	Liga ACB	16th	10–24						
2016–17	1	Liga ACB	17th	5–27						
2017–18	2	LEB Oro	2nd	33–14		Copa Princesa	RU			
2018–19	1	Liga ACB	8th	17–19						
2019–20	1	Liga ACB	13th (Note: League ended prematurely due to the coronavirus pandemic.)	9–14				3 Champions League	RS	7–7
2020–21	1	Liga ACB	10th	17–19						
2021–22	1	Liga ACB	7th	20–16	Quarterfinalist			3 Champions League	RU	12–4
2022–23	1	Liga ACB	14th	12–22				3 Champions League	QF	8–7
2023–24	1	Liga ACB	8th	19–17	Quarterfinalist					
2024–25	1	Liga ACB	10th	17–17	Quarterfinalist			3 Champions League	R16	7–5
2025–26	1	Liga ACB	10th	16–18				2 EuroCup	EF	11–8

== Trophies and awards ==
=== Trophies ===
- Spanish championships: (1)
  - 1997–98
- Spanish cups: (1)
  - 1996
- 2nd division championships: (1)
  - LEB Oro: (1) 2007
- Catalan basketball leagues: (4)
  - 1997, 1999, 2021, 2025
- LEB Catalan basketball league (Catalan 2nd Division Cup): (2)
  - 2000, 2001
- Trofeu General Orgaz-Copa Ciutat de Barcelona: (1)
  - 1940
- Liga de Verano ACB

Winners (4): 1996, 1998, 2000, 2003

=== Individual awards ===
ACB Finals MVP

- Joan Creus – 1998

Spanish Cup MVP

- Joan Creus – 1996

ACB Rising Star

- Micah Downs – 2012

All-ACB Second Team

- Dejan Musli – 2016

ACB Slam Dunk Champion

- Nate Higgs – 2000
- Serge Ibaka – 2008

ACB Three Point Shootout Champion

- Sergiy Gladyr – 2010

LEB Oro MVP

- Jordi Trias – 2018

== Notable players ==
Note: Flags indicate national team eligibility at FIBA-sanctioned events. Players may hold other non-FIBA nationalities not displayed.

Criteria

To appear in this section a player must have either:

- Set a club record or won an individual award while at the club
- Played at least one official international match for their national team at any time
- Played at least one official NBA match at any time.

- (Catalonia) (Spain) Joan Creus
- (Catalonia) (Spain) Roger Grimau
- (Catalonia) (Spain) Rafa Martínez
- (Catalonia) (Spain) Albert Oliver
- (Catalonia) (Spain) Dani Pérez
- (Catalonia) (Spain) Jordi Trias
- (Balearic Islands) (Spain) Sergio Llull
- (Spain) (Republic of the Congo) Serge Ibaka
- (Spain) (Argentina) Juan Domingo de la Cruz
- (Argentina) Juan Alberto Espil
- (Argentina) Andrés Nocioni
- (Argentina) Juan Pablo Vaulet
- (Belgium) Ismaël Bako
- (Bosnia and Herzegovina) (United States) Alex Renfroe
- (Denmark) Gabriel Lundberg
- (Dominican Republic) Eulis Báez
- (Estonia) Siim-Sander Vene
- (Finland) Elias Valtonen
- (Finland) Erik Murphy
- (France) Sylvain Francisco
- (Hungary) Ádám Hanga
- (Lithuania) Marius Grigonis
- (Lithuania) Deividas Dulkys
- (Lithuania) Martinas Geben
- (Nigeria) Chima Moneke
- (Panama) Rolando Frazer
- (Serbia) Dejan Musli
- (Senegal) Brancou Badio
- (United Kingdom) Kieron Achara
- (United States) Derrick Alston
- (United States) Derrick Alston Jr.
- (United States) Toby Bailey
- (United States) Justin Doellman
- (United States) Granger Hall
- (United States) Nate Higgs
- (United States) Jeff Lamp
- (United States) Scott Machado
- (United States) Devin Robinson
- (United States) Linton Townes
