= El Clásico (basketball) =

Matches between Real Madrid and FC Barcelona

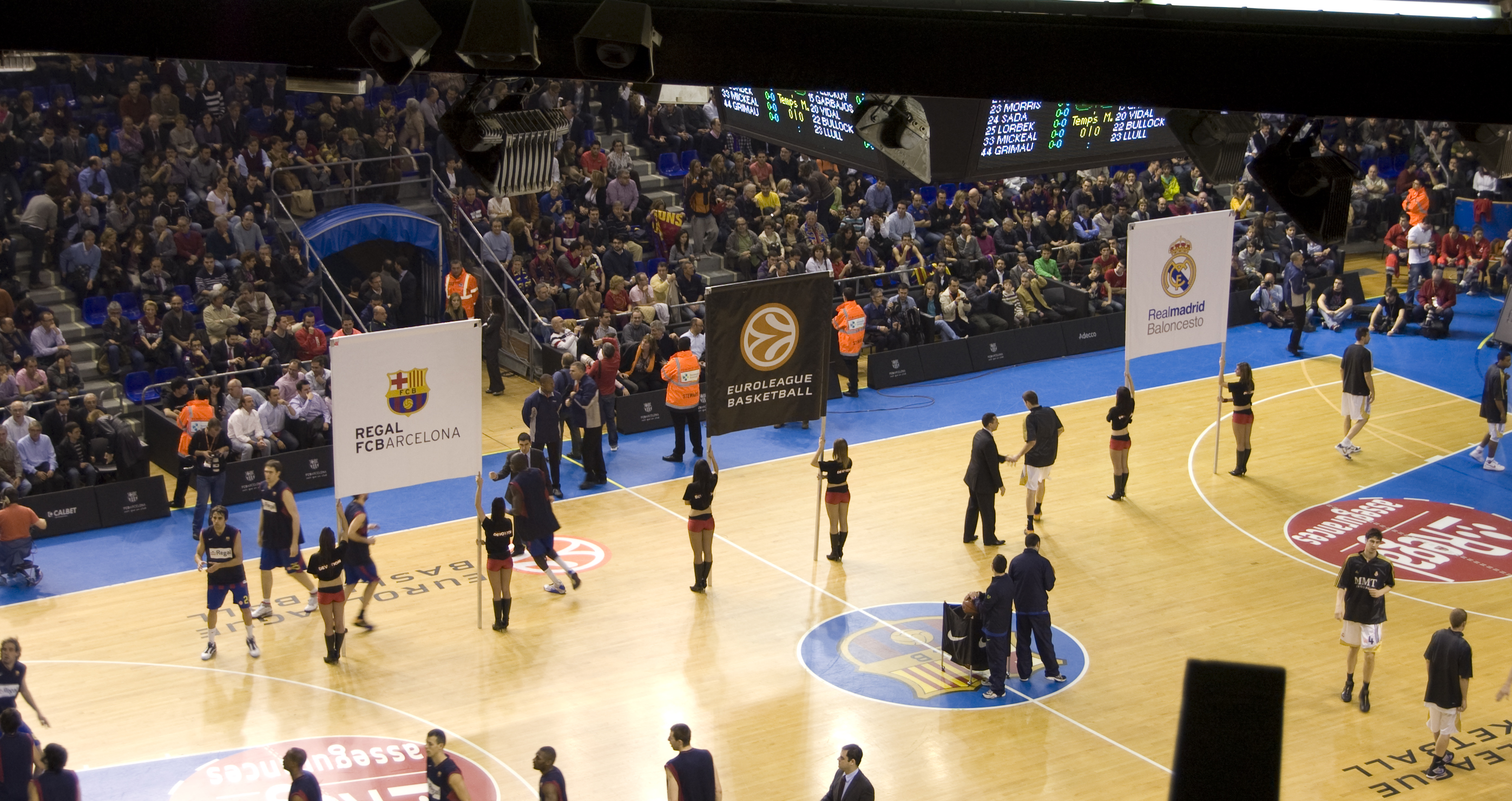
- EuroLeague Clásico at Palau Blaugrana in 2010
- Other names: Real Madrid vs. Barcelona
- Location: Spain
- Teams: Barcelona; Real Madrid
- First meeting: Real Madrid 25–12 Barcelona; Exhibition game (18 March 1942)
- Latest meeting: Barcelona 76–95 Real Madrid; 2025–26 ACB (22 March 2026)
- Next meeting: 3 December 2026; EuroLeague; Real Madrid v Barcelona
- Stadiums: Palau Blaugrana (Barcelona); Movistar Arena (Real Madrid)

Statistics
- Total meetings: 350
- Most wins: Barcelona (174 wins)
- Largest victory: Real Madrid 138–78 Barcelona; 1976–77 Liga Nacional (13 March 1977); Real Madrid 125–65 Barcelona; 1973–74 Liga Nacional (11 November 1973)

El Clásico (Spanish pronunciation: [el ˈklasiko]; Catalan: El Clàssic, pronounced [əl ˈklasik]; "The Classic"), is the name given to the basketball matches between Real Madrid and FC Barcelona (named after the cities they are based in; both cities are separated by 621 km), the two most successful and most supported basketball teams in Spain. Just as their football rivalry, basketball Clásico is known for its intensity and adversarial nature.

The first match was played on 18 March 1942, at the Frontón Recoletos in Madrid. It was an exhibition game and is notable for having been played around midnight, with the tip-off scheduled at 23:45 p.m. Real Madrid defeated Barcelona 25-12.

== Head-to-head statistics ==
Competition	GP	RMB	D	FCB
Liga	140	73	1	66
ACB Playoffs	87	46	0	41
Copa del Rey	63	22	2	39
Copa Príncipe de Asturias	1	0	0	1
Supercopa	14	9	0	5
EuroLeague	45	23	0	22
Total in all games	350	173	3	174

Updated as of 22 March 2026

== Results ==
=== Regular season ===
#	Season	Date	Round	Boxscore	Home team	Score	Away team	Attendance
1	1957	13 April 1957	5		Real Madrid	73 – 55	Barcelona	
2	1957	19 May 1957	13		Barcelona	60 – 50	Real Madrid	
3	1958	9 March 1958	10		Real Madrid	64 – 39	Barcelona	
4	1958	25 May 1958	22		Barcelona	55 – 70	Real Madrid	
5	1958-59	21 December 1958	6		Real Madrid	51 – 36	Barcelona	
6	1958-59	15 February 1959	17		Barcelona	59 – 58	Real Madrid	
7	1959-60	24 January 1960	11		Barcelona	69 – 75	Real Madrid	
8	1959-60	6 March 1960	22		Real Madrid	84 – 70	Barcelona	
9	1960-61	11 December 1960	4		Real Madrid	69 – 42	Barcelona	
10	1960-61	5 February 1961	16		Barcelona	50 – 63	Real Madrid	
11	1965-66	3 January 1966	9		Real Madrid	111 – 66	Barcelona	
12	1965-66	13 March 1966	18		Barcelona	61 – 77	Real Madrid	
13	1966-67	30 October 1966	4		Barcelona	63 – 71	Real Madrid	
14	1966-67	29 January 1967	15		Real Madrid	108 – 72	Barcelona	
15	1967-68	12 November 1967	2		Real Madrid	92 – 61	Barcelona	
16	1967-68	11 February 1968	13		Barcelona	67 – 90	Real Madrid	
17	1968-69	5 January 1969	7		Real Madrid	113 – 56	Barcelona	
18	1968-69	23 March 1969	18		Barcelona	82 – 98	Real Madrid	
19	1969-70	4 January 1970	11		Real Madrid	93 – 73	Barcelona	
20	1969-70	19 March 1970	22		Barcelona	86 – 67	Real Madrid	
21	1970-71	15 November 1970	6		Barcelona	83 – 84	Real Madrid	
22	1970-71	31 January 1971	17		Real Madrid	92 – 60	Barcelona	
23	1971-72	31 October 1971	5		Barcelona	60 – 57	Real Madrid	
24	1971-72	16 January 1972	17		Real Madrid	102 – 73	Barcelona	
25	1972-73	14 January 1973	11		Barcelona	62 – 63	Real Madrid	
26	1972-73	29 April 1973	26		Real Madrid	86 – 72	Barcelona	
27	1973-74	11 November 1973	1		Real Madrid	125 – 65	Barcelona	
28	1973-74	24 February 1974	16		Barcelona	85 – 85	Real Madrid	
29	1974-75	23 November 1974	5		Real Madrid	100 – 83	Barcelona	
30	1974-75	16 February 1975	16		Barcelona	90 – 77	Real Madrid	
31	1975-76	29 November 1975	11 (1st Stage)		Real Madrid	102 – 82	Barcelona	
32	1975-76	15 February 1976	22 (1st Stage)		Barcelona	73 – 74	Real Madrid	
33	1975-76	19 March 1976	5 (2nd Stage)		Real Madrid	114 – 76	Barcelona	
34	1975-76	25 April 1976	10 (2nd Stage)		Barcelona	89 – 71	Real Madrid	
35	1976-77	12 December 1976	9		Barcelona	92 – 73	Real Madrid	
36	1976-77	13 March 1977	20		Real Madrid	138 – 78	Barcelona	
37	1977-78	15 January 1978	7		Real Madrid	115 – 92	Barcelona	
38	1977-78	2 April 1978	18		Barcelona	101 – 95	Real Madrid	
39	1978-79	3 December 1978	10		Real Madrid	96 – 83	Barcelona	
40	1978-79	25 February 1979	21		Barcelona	92 – 85	Real Madrid	
41	1979-80	4 November 1979	5		Real Madrid	84 – 85	Barcelona	
42	1979-80	5 January 1980	16		Barcelona	89 – 102	Real Madrid	
43	1980–81	25 October 1980	3		Real Madrid	67 – 86	Barcelona	
44	1980–81	24 January 1981	16		Barcelona	96 – 86	Real Madrid	
45	1981-82	17 January 1982	13		Real Madrid	95 – 93	Barcelona	
46	1981-82	17 April 1982	26		Barcelona	93 – 102	Real Madrid	
47	1982-83	20 November 1982	7		Real Madrid	91 – 85	Barcelona	
48	1982-83	12 February 1983	20		Barcelona	82 – 80	Real Madrid	
49	1982-83	7 April 1983	Title Game		Barcelona	76 – 70	Real Madrid	
50	1983-84	28 December 1983	5 (2nd Stage)		Barcelona	88 – 74	Real Madrid	
51	1983-84	8 February 1984	12 (2nd Stage)		Real Madrid	93 – 88	Barcelona	
52	1984-85	6 January 1985	6 (2nd Stage)		Barcelona	67 – 82	Real Madrid	
53	1984-85	24 February 1985	13 (2nd Stage)		Real Madrid	75 – 72	Barcelona	
54	1985-86	22 September 1985	1 (1st Stage)		Real Madrid	104 – 92	Barcelona	
55	1985-86	3 November 1985	8 (1st Stage)		Barcelona	86 – 87	Real Madrid	
56	1985-86	28 December 1985	2 (2nd Stage)		Real Madrid	76 – 94	Barcelona	
57	1985-86	15 February 1986	9 (2nd Stage)		Barcelona	88 – 92	Real Madrid	
58	1986-87	10 January 1987	4 (2nd Stage)		Barcelona	84 – 79	Real Madrid	
59	1986-87	15 February 1987	11 (2nd Stage)		Real Madrid	100 – 99	Barcelona	
60	1987-88	7 February 1988	6 (2nd Stage)		Barcelona	80 – 85	Real Madrid	
61	1987-88	27 March 1988	13 (2nd Stage)		Real Madrid	92 – 99	Barcelona	
62	1988-89	17 December 1988	10 (1st Stage)		Real Madrid	81 – 67	Barcelona	
63	1988-89	10 February 1989	21 (1st Stage)		Barcelona	98 – 101	Real Madrid	
64	1988-89	18 February 1989	1 (2nd Stage)		Barcelona	87 – 94	Real Madrid	
65	1988-89	8 April 1989	8 (2nd Stage)		Real Madrid	87 – 95	Barcelona	
66	1989-90	17 October 1989	7 (1st Stage)		Real Madrid	91 – 78	Barcelona	
67	1989-90	7 January 1990	18 (1st Stage)		Barcelona	113 – 89	Real Madrid	
68	1989-90	24 February 1990	2 (2nd Stage)		Real Madrid	85 – 87	Barcelona	
69	1989-90	8 April 1990	9 (2nd Stage)		Barcelona	82 – 81	Real Madrid	
70	1990-91	21 October 1990	8		Barcelona	70 – 66	Real Madrid	
71	1990-91	20 January 1991	25		Real Madrid	76 – 73	Barcelona	
72	1991-92	3 November 1991	11		Real Madrid	78 – 69	Barcelona	
73	1991-92	16 February 1992	28		Barcelona	86 – 88	Real Madrid	
74	1992-93	5 December 1992	15		Real Madrid	77 – 88	Barcelona	
75	1992-93	14 February 1993	26		Barcelona	70 – 86	Real Madrid	
76	1993-94	12 October 1993	7		Real Madrid	84 – 95	Barcelona	
77	1993-94	9 January 1994	18		Barcelona	76 – 86	Real Madrid	
78	1994-95	23 October 1994	12		Barcelona	86 – 71	Real Madrid	
79	1994-95	12 March 1995	31		Real Madrid	86 – 89	Barcelona	
80	1995-96	23 October 1995	9		Barcelona	77 – 84	Real Madrid	
81	1995-96	18 February 1996	26		Real Madrid	102 – 110	Barcelona	
82	1996-97	27 October 1996	11		Barcelona	86 – 76	Real Madrid	
83	1996-97	23 March 1997	33		Real Madrid	77 – 85	Barcelona	
84	1997-98	2 November 1997	11		Barcelona	73 – 91	Real Madrid	
85	1997-98	5 April 1998	30		Real Madrid	84 – 71	Barcelona	
86	1998-99	13 December 1998	15		Real Madrid	75 – 70	Barcelona	
87	1998-99	16 April 1999	34		Barcelona	91 – 81	Real Madrid	
88	1999-00	11 December 1999	15		Barcelona	66 – 61	Real Madrid	
89	1999-00	8 April 2000	32		Real Madrid	63 – 72	Barcelona	
90	2000-01	9 December 2000	10		Barcelona	82 – 54	Real Madrid	7,500
91	2000-01	14 April 2001	28		Real Madrid	89 – 77	Barcelona	3,500
92	2001-02	27 October 2001	6		Real Madrid	97 – 76	Barcelona	5,200
93	2001-02	2 March 2002	23		Barcelona	78 – 73	Real Madrid	8,000
94	2002-03	30 December 2002	14		Real Madrid	75 – 83	Barcelona	5,300
95	2002-03	29 April 2003	31		Barcelona	92 – 91	Real Madrid	8,000
96	2003-04	28 December 2003	17		Real Madrid	81 – 88	Barcelona	5,300
97	2003-04	10 April 2004	31		Barcelona	81 – 78	Real Madrid	7,923
98	2004-05	12 December 2004	13		Barcelona	64 – 66	Real Madrid	7,000
99	2004-05	17 April 2005	29		Real Madrid	74 – 81	Barcelona	14,000
100	2005-06	11 December 2005	11		Real Madrid	72 – 73	Barcelona	12,500
101	2005-06	9 April 2006	27		Barcelona	66 – 69	Real Madrid	6,471
102	2006-07	25 November 2006	10		Real Madrid	90 – 73	Barcelona	13,900
103	2006-07	17 March 2007	25		Barcelona	73 – 68	Real Madrid	7,200
104	2007-08	28 December 2007	14		Barcelona	84 – 65	Real Madrid	7,416
105	2007-08	26 April 2008	32		Real Madrid	90 – 73	Barcelona	13,000
106	2008-09	20 December 2008	14		Barcelona	87 – 67	Real Madrid	7,521
107	2008-09	18 April 2009	31		Real Madrid	76 – 79	Barcelona	12,900
108	2009-10	27 December 2009	14		Real Madrid	57 – 79	Barcelona	13,000
109	2009-10	10 April 2010	29		Barcelona	78 – 73	Real Madrid	7,458
110	2010-11	30 December 2010	13		Barcelona	95 – 75	Real Madrid	7,411
111	2010-11	9 April 2011	29		Real Madrid	77 – 72	Barcelona	10,788
112	2011-12	4 January 2012	14		Real Madrid	78 – 74	Barcelona	12,888
113	2011-12	3 May 2012	33		Barcelona	86 – 83	Real Madrid	6,577
114	2012-13	30 December 2012	15		Barcelona	96 – 89	Real Madrid	7,359
115	2012-13	28 April 2013	31		Real Madrid	78 – 65	Barcelona	12,238
116	2013-14	29 December 2013	13		Real Madrid	98 – 84	Barcelona	13,217
117	2013-14	10 May 2014	32		Barcelona	86 – 75	Real Madrid	7,002
118	2014-15	28 December 2014	13		Barcelona	76 – 68	Real Madrid	7,261
119	2014-15	12 April 2015	28		Real Madrid	91 – 78	Barcelona	12,178
120	2015-16	27 December 2015	13		Real Madrid	84 – 91	Barcelona	13,149
121	2015-16	24 April 2016	29		Barcelona	86 – 91	Real Madrid	6,627
122	2016-17	6 November 2016	7		Barcelona	85 – 75	Real Madrid	6,581
123	2016-17	12 March 2017	24		Real Madrid	76 – 75	Barcelona	12,448
124	2017-18	12 November 2017	8		Real Madrid	80 – 84	Barcelona	12,114
125	2017-18	11 March 2018	22		Barcelona	94 – 72	Real Madrid	5,687
126	2018-19	25 November 2018	10		Barcelona	86 – 69	Real Madrid	7,159
127	2018-19	24 March 2019	24		Real Madrid	76 – 82	Barcelona	12,120
128	2019-20	29 December 2019	15		Barcelona	83 – 63	Real Madrid	7,387
129	2020-21	27 December 2020	16		Real Madrid	82 – 87	Barcelona	0 (Note: Held behind closed doors due to the COVID-19 pandemic)
130	2020-21	11 April 2021	30		Barcelona	85 – 87	Real Madrid	0 (Note: Held behind closed doors due to the COVID-19 pandemic)
131	2021-22	23 January 2022	16		Real Madrid	75 – 85	Barcelona	7,049 (Note: Reduced capacity due to the COVID-19 pandemic)
132	2021-22	10 April 2022	28		Barcelona	108 – 97	Real Madrid	7,438
133	2022-23	2 January 2023	14		Real Madrid	78 – 87	Barcelona	11,187
134	2022-23	16 April 2023	27		Barcelona	97 – 82	Real Madrid	7,580
135	2023-24	1 October 2023	3		Real Madrid	86 – 79	Barcelona	11,235
136	2023-24	7 April 2024	28		Barcelona	85 – 79	Real Madrid	7,726
137	2024-25	29 December 2024	13		Real Madrid	73 – 71	Barcelona	12,050
138	2024-25	6 April 2025	26		Barcelona	89 – 91	Real Madrid	7,334
139	2025-26	4 January 2026	14		Real Madrid	100 – 105	Barcelona	11,736
140	2025-26	22 March 2026	23		Barcelona	76 – 95	Real Madrid	7,032
141	2026-27	27 December 2026	14		Barcelona	–	Real Madrid	
142	2026-27	28 March 2027	26		Real Madrid	–	Barcelona	

=== Liga ACB Playoffs ===
#	Season	Date	Round	Boxscore	Home team	Score	Away team	Attendance
1	1983–84	8 April 1984	F		Barcelona	65 – 80	Real Madrid	
2	1983–84	13 April 1984	F		Real Madrid	79 – 81	Barcelona	
3	1983–84	14 April 1984	F		Real Madrid	2-0	Barcelona	
4	1985–86	3 May 1986	F		Real Madrid	83 – 80	Barcelona	
5	1985–86	10 May 1986	F		Barcelona	86 – 88	Real Madrid	
6	1986–87	4 April 1987	SF		Barcelona	91 – 90	Real Madrid	
7	1986–87	6 April 1987	SF		Barcelona	89 – 80	Real Madrid	
8	1986–87	9 April 1987	SF		Real Madrid	95 – 91	Barcelona	
9	1986–87	14 April 1987	SF		Real Madrid	78 – 87	Barcelona	
10	1987–88	14 May 1988	F		Barcelona	75 – 73	Real Madrid	
11	1987–88	16 May 1988	F		Barcelona	87 – 77	Real Madrid	
12	1987–88	19 May 1988	F		Real Madrid	90 – 85	Barcelona	
13	1987–88	21 May 1988	F		Real Madrid	90 – 78	Barcelona	
14	1987–88	24 May 1988	F		Barcelona	93 – 79	Real Madrid	
15	1988–89	16 May 1989	F		Barcelona	94 – 69	Real Madrid	4,000
16	1988–89	18 May 1989	F		Barcelona	81 – 88	Real Madrid	5,000
17	1988–89	21 May 1989	F		Real Madrid	86 – 100	Barcelona	12,000
18	1988–89	23 May 1989	F		Real Madrid	88 – 87	Barcelona	12,000
19	1988–89	25 May 1989	F		Barcelona	96 – 85	Real Madrid	6,000
20	1991–92	19 April 1992	QF		Real Madrid	87 – 84	Barcelona	10,000
21	1991–92	23 April 1992	QF		Barcelona	86 – 92	Real Madrid	13,375
22	1993–94	20 May 1994	F		Real Madrid	81 – 67	Barcelona	9,500
23	1993–94	22 May 1994	F		Real Madrid	79 – 69	Barcelona	12,000
24	1993–94	26 May 1994	F		Barcelona	64 – 77	Real Madrid	11,100
25	1994–95	27 April 1995	SF		Barcelona	94 – 65	Real Madrid	8,000
26	1994–95	29 April 1995	SF		Barcelona	68 – 75	Real Madrid	8,000
27	1994–95	4 May 1995	SF		Real Madrid	68 – 83	Barcelona	12,000
28	1994–95	6 May 1995	SF		Real Madrid	82 – 77	Barcelona	12,000
29	1994–95	9 May 1995	SF		Barcelona	84 – 65	Real Madrid	8,000
30	1996–97	11 May 1997	F		Real Madrid	79 – 83	Barcelona	11,000
31	1996–97	13 May 1997	F		Real Madrid	93 – 86	Barcelona	11,300
32	1996–97	16 May 1997	F		Barcelona	94 – 90	Real Madrid	8,000
33	1996–97	18 May 1997	F		Barcelona	83 – 89	Real Madrid	8,000
34	1996–97	20 May 1997	F		Real Madrid	69 – 82	Barcelona	12,000
35	1999–2000	26 May 2000	F		Barcelona	64 – 72	Real Madrid	7,800
36	1999–2000	28 May 2000	F		Barcelona	83 – 55	Real Madrid	7,800
37	1999–2000	31 May 2000	F		Real Madrid	87 – 61	Barcelona	5,200
38	1999–2000	2 June 2000	F		Real Madrid	71 – 80	Barcelona	5,200
39	1999–2000	5 June 2000	F		Barcelona	73 – 82	Real Madrid	8,000
40	2000–01	16 June 2001	F		Barcelona	81 – 73	Real Madrid	8,000
41	2000–01	18 June 2001	F		Barcelona	80 – 77	Real Madrid	8,000
42	2000–01	21 May 2001	F		Real Madrid	84 – 96	Barcelona	5,200
43	2005–06	19 May 2006	QF		Barcelona	79 – 67	Real Madrid	5,617
44	2005–06	21 May 2006	QF		Real Madrid	70 – 88	Barcelona	11,800
45	2005–06	26 May 2006	QF		Barcelona	76 – 84	Real Madrid	6,573
46	2005–06	28 May 2006	QF		Real Madrid	68 – 83	Barcelona	12,100
47	2006–07	17 June 2007	F		Real Madrid	69 – 62	Barcelona	13,780
48	2006–07	19 June 2007	F		Real Madrid	83 – 80	Barcelona	13,780
49	2006–07	22 June 2007	F		Barcelona	75 – 70	Real Madrid	7,394
50	2006–07	24 June 2007	F		Barcelona	71 – 82	Real Madrid	7,301
51	2011–12	6 June 2012	F		Barcelona	81 – 80	Real Madrid	6,377
52	2011–12	8 June 2012	F		Barcelona	69 – 75	Real Madrid	7,151
53	2011–12	11 June 2012	F		Real Madrid	85 – 59	Barcelona	13,109
54	2011–12	13 June 2012	F		Real Madrid	75 – 81	Barcelona	13,248
55	2011–12	16 June 2012	F		Barcelona	73 – 69	Real Madrid	7,691
56	2012–13	9 June 2013	F		Real Madrid	76 – 72	Barcelona	10,859
57	2012–13	11 June 2013	F		Real Madrid	71 – 72	Barcelona	12,348
58	2012–13	14 June 2013	F		Barcelona	72 – 84	Real Madrid	7,562
59	2012–13	16 June 2013	F		Barcelona	73 – 62	Real Madrid	7,219
60	2012–13	19 June 2013	F		Real Madrid	79 – 71	Barcelona	12,832
61	2013–14	19 June 2014	F		Real Madrid	93 – 98	Barcelona	11,342
62	2013–14	21 June 2014	F		Real Madrid	87 – 78	Barcelona	11,871
63	2013–14	24 June 2014	F		Barcelona	94 – 79	Real Madrid	7,328
64	2013–14	26 June 2014	F		Barcelona	83 – 81	Real Madrid	7,537
65	2014–15	19 June 2015	F		Real Madrid	78 – 72	Barcelona	11,871
66	2014–15	21 June 2015	F		Real Madrid	100 – 80	Barcelona	12,924
67	2014–15	24 June 2015	F		Barcelona	85 – 90	Real Madrid	7,247
68	2015–16	15 June 2016	F		Barcelona	100 – 99	Real Madrid	6,471
69	2015–16	17 June 2016	F		Barcelona	70 – 90	Real Madrid	6,742
70	2015–16	20 June 2016	F		Real Madrid	91 – 74	Barcelona	12,038
71	2015–16	22 June 2016	F		Real Madrid	91 – 84	Barcelona	12,173
72	2018–19	15 June 2019	F		Real Madrid	87 – 67	Barcelona	11,876
73	2018–19	17 June 2019	F		Real Madrid	81 – 80	Barcelona	12,247
74	2018–19	19 June 2019	F		Barcelona	78 – 77	Real Madrid	7,238
75	2018–19	21 June 2019	F		Barcelona	68 – 74	Real Madrid	7,301
76	2020–21	13 June 2021	F		Real Madrid	75 – 89	Barcelona	1,000 (Note: Reduced capacity due to the COVID-19 pandemic)
77	2020–21	15 June 2021	F		Barcelona	92 – 73	Real Madrid	1,000 (Note: Reduced capacity due to the COVID-19 pandemic)
78	2021–22	13 June 2022	F		Barcelona	75 – 88	Real Madrid	6,759
79	2021–22	15 June 2022	F		Barcelona	71 – 69	Real Madrid	7,201
80	2021–22	17 June 2022	F		Real Madrid	81 – 66	Barcelona	11,793
81	2021–22	19 June 2022	F		Real Madrid	81 – 74	Barcelona	12,315
82	2022–23	16 June 2023	F		Barcelona	97 – 88	Real Madrid	6,819
83	2022–23	18 June 2023	F		Barcelona	86 – 85	Real Madrid	7,406
84	2022–23	20 June 2023	F		Real Madrid	82 – 93	Barcelona	11,965
85	2023–24	29 May 2024	SF		Real Madrid	97 – 78	Barcelona	11,274
86	2023–24	31 May 2024	SF		Real Madrid	104 – 98	Barcelona	12,025
87	2023–24	2 June 2024	SF		Barcelona	92 – 95	Real Madrid	7,066

=== Copa del Rey ===
#	Season	Date	R	Boxscore	Home team	Score	Away team	Arena	Attendance
1	1945	28 April 1945	R1		Real Madrid	35 – 30	Barcelona		
2	1945	31 May 1945	R2		Barcelona	40 – 23	Real Madrid	Zaragoza	
3	1946	17 February 1946	R1		Real Madrid	48 – 51	Barcelona		
4	1946	10 March 1946	R1		Barcelona	44 – 21	Real Madrid		
5	1947	5 January 1947	R1		Real Madrid	36 – 54	Barcelona		
6	1947	18 January 1947	R1		Barcelona	77 – 25	Real Madrid		
7	1947	18 May 1947	SF		Real Madrid	34 – 53	Barcelona		
8	1947	25 May 1947	SF		Barcelona	55 – 24	Real Madrid		
9	1949	15 May 1949	FR		Barcelona	46 – 33	Real Madrid	Palacio de Deportes, Madrid	
10	1950	6 May 1950	SF		Real Madrid	32 – 33	Barcelona	Plaza de Toros de Las Arenas, Barcelona	
11	1951	13 June 1951	F		Barcelona	36 – 47	Real Madrid	Frontón Gros, San Sebastián	
12	1955	4 June 1955	SF		Barcelona	39 – 49	Real Madrid	Pabellón de la Gran Vía, Barcelona	
13	1959	6 June 1959	SF		Real Madrid	63 – 68	Barcelona		
14	1959	14 June 1959	SF		Barcelona	65 – 58	Real Madrid		
15	1960	8 May 1960	SF		Barcelona	64 – 72	Real Madrid		
16	1960	15 May 1960	SF		Real Madrid	81 – 47	Barcelona		
17	1961	28 May 1961	F		Real Madrid	76 – 51	Barcelona	Frontón del Club Deportivo, Bilbao	
18	1968	5 May 1968	QF		Real Madrid	91 – 61	Barcelona		
19	1968	12 May 1968	QF		Barcelona	76 – 83	Real Madrid		
20	1971	28 March 1971	QF		Real Madrid	88 – 62	Barcelona		
21	1971	4 April 1971	QF		Barcelona	60 – 50	Real Madrid		
22	1972	2 April 1972	SF		Barcelona	64 – 64	Real Madrid		
23	1972	9 April 1972	SF		Real Madrid	68 – 66	Barcelona		
24	1973	17 May 1973	QF		Barcelona	85 – 79	Real Madrid		
25	1973	24 May 1973	QF		Real Madrid	102 – 77	Barcelona		
26	1974	9 May 1974	SF		Real Madrid	85 – 72	Barcelona		
27	1974	22 May 1974	SF		Barcelona	73 – 62	Real Madrid		
28	1975	16 April 1975	SF		Barcelona	66 – 60	Real Madrid		
29	1975	19 April 1975	SF		Real Madrid	77 – 66	Barcelona		
30	1976	8 April 1976	SF		Barcelona	82 – 94	Real Madrid		
31	1976	22 April 1976	SF		Real Madrid	129 – 86	Barcelona		
32	1977	26 June 1977	F		Real Madrid	97 – 71	Barcelona	Nuevo Palacio de Deportes, Palma	4,500
33	1978	4 June 1978	F		Barcelona	103 – 96	Real Madrid	Pabellón Municipal, Zaragoza	4,000
34	1980	9 March 1980	QF		Real Madrid	93 – 93	Barcelona		
35	1980	16 March 1980	QF		Barcelona	110 – 91	Real Madrid		
36	1981	29 April 1981	F		Barcelona	106 – 90	Real Madrid	Pabellón Municipal, Almería	3,000
37	1982	3 June 1982	F		Real Madrid	108 – 110	Barcelona	Pabellón de Entrepuentes, Badajoz	2,500
38	1983	20 April 1983	SF		Barcelona	2-0	Real Madrid	Palau Blaugrana, Barcelona	
39	1984	30 November 1983	QF		Real Madrid	100 – 102	Barcelona	Pabellón Municipal de Deportes, Zaragoza	
40	1988	22 December 1987	F		Barcelona	84 – 83	Real Madrid	Pabellón Polideportivo Pisuerga, Valladolid	6,000
41	1989	17 November 1988	F		Real Madrid	85 – 81	Barcelona	Pazo dos Deportes de Riazor, A Coruña	8,000
42	1991	23 February 1991	SF		Barcelona	82 – 81	Real Madrid	Pabellón Príncipe Felipe, Zaragoza	
43	1994	5 March 1994	SF		Real Madrid	75 – 81	Barcelona	San Pablo, Seville	
44	1996	24 February 1996	SF		Barcelona	80 – 72	Real Madrid	Palacio de Deportes, Murcia	
45	1997	1 February 1997	QF		Barcelona	115 – 110	Real Madrid	Palacio de los Deportes, León	
46	2000	18 March 2000	QF		Barcelona	73 – 68	Real Madrid	Araba Arena, Vitoria-Gasteiz	
47	2001	18 March 2001	F		Barcelona	80 – 77	Real Madrid	Martín Carpena, Málaga	8,500
48	2003	21 February 2003	QF		Barcelona	72 – 59	Real Madrid	Fuente de San Luis, Valencia	8,500
49	2004	26 February 2004	QF		Barcelona	80 – 79	Real Madrid	San Pablo, Seville	9,100
50	2006	17 February 2006	QF		Real Madrid	77 – 67	Barcelona	Palacio de Deportes de la CAM, Madrid	13,400
51	2007	11 February 2007	F		Real Madrid	53 – 69	Barcelona	Martín Carpena, Málaga	10,200
52	2009	2 February 2009	QF		Real Madrid	75 – 83	Barcelona	Palacio de Deportes de la CAM, Madrid	11,000
53	2010	21 February 2010	F		Barcelona	80 – 61	Real Madrid	Bizkaia Arena, Barakaldo	14,814
54	2011	13 February 2011	F		Real Madrid	60 – 68	Barcelona	Palacio de Deportes de la CAM, Madrid	13,045
55	2012	19 February 2012	F		Barcelona	74 – 91	Real Madrid	Palau Sant Jordi, Barcelona	15,128
56	2013	7 February 2013	QF		Real Madrid	108 – 111	Barcelona	Fernando Buesa Arena, Vitoria-Gasteiz	14,500
57	2014	9 February 2014	F		Barcelona	76 – 77	Real Madrid	Martín Carpena, Málaga	11,000
58	2015	22 February 2015	F		Barcelona	71 – 77	Real Madrid	Gran Canaria Arena, Las Palmas	9,870
59	2018	18 February 2018	F		Real Madrid	90 – 92	Barcelona	Gran Canaria Arena, Las Palmas	9,912
60	2019	17 February 2019	F		Real Madrid	93 – 94	Barcelona	WiZink Center, Madrid	13,468
61	2021	14 February 2021	F		Real Madrid	73 – 88	Barcelona	WiZink Center, Madrid	0 (Note: Held behind closed doors due to the COVID-19 pandemic)
62	2022	20 February 2022	F		Real Madrid	59 – 64	Barcelona	Palacio Municipal de Deportes, Granada	6,918
63	2024	18 February 2024	F		Real Madrid	96 – 85	Barcelona	Martín Carpena, Málaga	10,900

=== Copa Príncipe de Asturias ACB ===
#	Season	Date	R	Boxscore	Home team	Score	Away team	Arena	Attendance
1	1988	13 April 1988	F		Barcelona	92 – 90	Real Madrid	Palau Municipal d'Esports Son Moix, Palma de Mallorca	

=== Supercopa ===
#	Season	Date	R	Boxscore	Home team	Score	Away team	Arena	Attendance
1	2004	26 September 2004	F		Real Madrid	75 – 76	Barcelona	Martín Carpena, Málaga	6,100
2	2009	3 October 2009	F		Barcelona	86 – 82	Real Madrid	Centro Insular de Deportes, Las Palmas	4,600
3	2010	24 September 2010	SF		Barcelona	89 – 55	Real Madrid	Fernando Buesa Arena, Vitoria-Gasteiz	9,600
4	2011	30 September 2011	SF		Barcelona	74 – 70	Real Madrid	Bilbao Arena, Bilbao	8,230
5	2012	23 September 2012	F		Barcelona	84 – 95	Real Madrid	Pabellón Príncipe Felipe, Zaragoza	7,000
6	2013	5 October 2013	F		Barcelona	79 – 83	Real Madrid	Fernando Buesa Arena, Vitoria-Gasteiz	8,217
7	2014	27 September 2014	F		Real Madrid	99 – 78	Barcelona	Fernando Buesa Arena, Vitoria-Gasteiz	8,452
8	2016	23 September 2016	SF		Real Madrid	93 – 99	Barcelona	Fernando Buesa Arena, Vitoria-Gasteiz	9,257
9	2019	22 September 2019	F		Real Madrid	89 – 79	Barcelona	WiZink Center, Madrid	12,348
10	2020	13 September 2020	F		Real Madrid	72 – 67	Barcelona	Santiago Martín, San Cristóbal de La Laguna	0 (Note: Held behind closed doors due to the COVID-19 pandemic)
11	2021	12 September 2021	F		Barcelona	83 – 88	Real Madrid	Santiago Martín, San Cristóbal de La Laguna	2,200 (Note: Capacity reduced due to the COVID-19 pandemic)
12	2022	25 September 2022	F		Real Madrid	89 – 83	Barcelona	San Pablo, Seville	5,855
13	2023	16 September 2023	SF		Barcelona	80 – 90	Real Madrid	Palacio de Deportes, Murcia	7,400
14	2024	21 September 2024	SF		Real Madrid	89 – 83	Barcelona	Palacio de Deportes, Murcia	7,400

=== EuroLeague ===
#	Season	Date	Stage	R	Boxscore	Home team	Score	Away team	Attendance
1	1993–94	6 January 1994	GS	7		Real Madrid	99 – 78	Barcelona	7,000
2	1993–94	24 February 1994	GS	14		Barcelona	80 – 64	Real Madrid	13,850
3	1995–96	23 November 1995	GS	3		Barcelona	88 – 80	Real Madrid	7,200
4	1995–96	17 January 1996	GS	10		Real Madrid	82 – 94	Barcelona	12,000
5	1995–96	9 April 1996	F4	SF		Barcelona	76 – 66	Real Madrid	11,000 (Note: Game played at the Palais Omnisports de Paris-Bercy in Paris)
6	2004–05	3 March 2005	T16	2		Barcelona	84 – 71	Real Madrid	8,000
7	2004–05	31 March 2005	T16	6		Real Madrid	76 – 73	Barcelona	9,700
8	2005–06	4 April 2006	QF	1		Barcelona	72 – 58	Real Madrid	7,397
9	2005–06	6 April 2006	QF	2		Real Madrid	84 – 78	Barcelona	13,000
10	2005–06	13 April 2006	QF	3		Barcelona	76 – 70	Real Madrid	8,000
11	2007–08	22 November 2007	RS	5		Barcelona	73 – 62	Real Madrid	7,311
12	2007–08	17 January 2008	RS	12		Real Madrid	82 – 79	Barcelona	13,000
13	2008–09	28 January 2009	T16	1		Real Madrid	85 – 83	Barcelona	12,500
14	2008–09	4 March 2009	T16	5		Barcelona	90 – 79	Real Madrid	7,592
15	2009–10	23 March 2010	QF	1		Barcelona	68 – 61	Real Madrid	7,428
16	2009–10	25 March 2010	QF	2		Barcelona	63 – 70	Real Madrid	7,585
17	2009–10	30 March 2010	QF	3		Real Madrid	73 – 84	Barcelona	13,500
18	2009–10	1 April 2010	QF	4		Real Madrid	78 – 84	Barcelona	13,700
19	2012–13	10 May 2013	F4	SF		Barcelona	67 – 74	Real Madrid	13,193 (Note: Game played at the O2 arena in London)
20	2013–14	16 May 2014	F4	SF		Barcelona	62 – 100	Real Madrid	11,843 (Note: Game played at the Mediolanum Forum in Assago)
21	2014–15	5 February 2015	T16	6		Real Madrid	97 – 73	Barcelona	12,662
22	2014–15	2 April 2015	T16	10		Barcelona	85 – 80	Real Madrid	8,529
23	2015–16	21 January 2016	T16	4		Real Madrid	86 – 87	Barcelona	12,018
24	2015–16	17 March 2016	T16	11		Barcelona	72 – 65	Real Madrid	7,142
25	2016–17	18 November 2016	RS	8		Barcelona	63 – 102	Real Madrid	7,013
26	2016–17	22 March 2017	RS	27		Real Madrid	85 – 69	Barcelona	11,759
27	2017–18	14 December 2017	RS	12		Real Madrid	87 – 75	Barcelona	10,516
28	2017–18	23 February 2018	RS	23		Barcelona	74 – 101	Real Madrid	6,829
29	2018–19	13 December 2018	RS	12		Real Madrid	92 – 65	Barcelona	11,953
30	2018–19	1 March 2019	RS	24		Barcelona	77 – 70	Real Madrid	7,311
31	2019–20	14 November 2019	RS	8		Real Madrid	86 – 76	Barcelona	12,729
32	2020–21	23 October 2020	RS	5		Barcelona	79 – 72	Real Madrid	0 (Note: Held behind closed doors due to the COVID-19 pandemic)
33	2020–21	11 March 2021	RS	29		Real Madrid	76 – 81	Barcelona	0 (Note: Held behind closed doors due to the COVID-19 pandemic)
34	2021–22	10 December 2021	RS	14		Barcelona	93 – 80	Real Madrid	7,079 (Note: Reduced capacity due to the COVID-19 pandemic)
35	2021–22	11 February 2022	RS	26		Real Madrid	68 – 86	Barcelona	9,131 (Note: Reduced capacity due to the COVID-19 pandemic)
36	2021–22	19 May 2022	F4	SF		Barcelona	83 – 86	Real Madrid	13,173 (Note: Game was played at the Štark Arena in Belgrade)
37	2022–23	13 October 2022	RS	2		Barcelona	75 – 73	Real Madrid	7,511
38	2022–23	26 January 2023	RS	21		Real Madrid	91 – 86	Barcelona	10,305
39	2022–23	19 May 2023	F4	SF		Barcelona	66 – 78	Real Madrid	11,411 (Note: Game was played at the Žalgiris Arena in Kaunas)
40	2023–24	26 October 2023	RS	5		Real Madrid	65 – 64	Barcelona	11,432
41	2023–24	3 January 2024	RS	18		Barcelona	83 – 78	Real Madrid	7,488
42	2024–25	28 November 2024	RS	12		Barcelona	90 – 97	Real Madrid	7,572
43	2024–25	27 February 2025	RS	27		Real Madrid	96 – 91	Barcelona	12,130
44	2025–26	7 November 2025	RS	9		Barcelona	92 – 101	Real Madrid	7,294
45	2025–26	16 January 2026	RS	22		Real Madrid	80 – 61	Barcelona	12,156
46	2026–27	3 December 2026	RS	15		Real Madrid	–	Barcelona	
47	2026–27	5 March 2027	RS	29		Barcelona	–	Real Madrid	

=== Honours ===
- Numbers with this background indicate the record in the competition.

Barcelona	Competition	Real Madrid
Domestic
20	Liga	38
27	Copa del Rey	29
6	Supercopa de España	10
1	Copa Príncipe de Asturias (defunct)	—
54	Aggregate	77
European
2	EuroLeague	11
2	FIBA Saporta Cup (defunct)	4
2	FIBA Korać Cup (defunct)	1
—	EuroCup	1
—	Latin Cup (defunct)	1
3	European Basketball Club Super Cup (semi-official, defunct)	3
—	EuroLeague SuperCup	1
9	Aggregate	22
Worldwide
1	Intercontinental Cup	5
1	Aggregate	5
64	Total aggregate	104

== Players who played for both clubs ==
Juan Núñez was the most recent player to transfer between the two rivals (in 2024).

Barcelona then Real Madrid

- 1956: (Spain) Alfonso Martínez (via Aismalíbar Montcada)
- 1956: (Spain) José Luis Martínez (via Aismalíbar Montcada)
- 1957: (Spain) Rafael González-Adrio
- 1959: (Spain) Jordi Parra
- 1964: (Spain) Miguel "Ché" González
- 1995: (Spain) Santi Abad (via Taugrés Baskonia)
- 1995: (Federal Republic of Yugoslavia) Zoran Savić (via PAOK Bravo)
- 1999: (Federal Republic of Yugoslavia) Aleksandar Đorđević
- 1999: (Spain) José Luis Galilea (via León Caja España)
- 2002: (France) Alain Digbeu
- 2002: (United States) Michael Hawkins (via Idea Śląsk)
- 2002: (United States) Derrick Alston (via Pamesa Valencia)
- 2008: (Argentina) Pepe Sánchez
- 2013: (Greece) Ioannis Bourousis (via EA7 Emporio Armani Milano)
- 2021: (France) Thomas Heurtel (via LDLC ASVEL)
- 2021: (Hungary) Ádám Hanga
- 2022: (Croatia) Mario Hezonja (via UNICS Kazan)

Real Madrid then Barcelona

- 1958: (Spain) Alfonso Martínez
- 1958: (Spain) José Luis Martínez
- 1990: (Puerto Rico) José "Piculín" Ortiz
- 2002: (Federal Republic of Yugoslavia) Dejan Bodiroga (via Panathinaikos)
- 2012: (Croatia) Ante Tomić
- 2013: (Poland) Maciej Lampe (via Caja Laboral)
- 2019: (Spain) Nikola Mirotić (via Milwaukee Bucks)
- 2021: (Argentina) Nicolás Laprovíttola
- 2023: (Spain) Willy Hernangómez (via New Orleans Pelicans)
- 2024: (Spain) Juan Núñez (via Ratiopharm Ulm)

From Barcelona to Real Madrid	7
From Barcelona to another club before Real Madrid	10
Total	17
From Real Madrid to Barcelona	5
From Real Madrid to another club before Barcelona	5
Total	10
Total Switches	27

== Managers who coached both clubs ==
- (Serbia) Božidar Maljković – Barcelona (1990–1992), then Real Madrid (2004–2006).

== See also ==
- El Clásico – rivalry between the two clubs' football divisions
