= CB Breogán =

Río Breogán
- Nickname: Breo
- League: Liga ACB
- Founded: 1966; 60 years ago
- History: CB Breogán (1966–present)
- Arena: Pazo dos Deportes
- Capacity: 5,310
- Location: Lugo, Spain
- Team colors: Sky blue and white
- Main sponsor: Río de Galicia
- President: Carmen Lence
- Head coach: Luis Casimiro
- Championships: 2 2nd division championship 3 Copa Princesa
- Website: cbbreogan.com
Home	Away

Club Baloncesto Breogán, S.A.D., also known as Río Breogán for sponsorship reasons, is a professional basketball club based in Lugo, Spain. The team was founded in 1966 and plays in the Liga ACB.

Their home arena is the Pazo dos Deportes, an arena with a seating capacity of 5,310 people. The current president of the team is Carmen Lence.

== History ==
Founded in 1966, CB Breogán only needed five years to promote for the first time in its history to the Liga Nacional. It played in it from 1971 to 1977, except in the 1974–75 season, before dropping down again to lower divisions. Alfredo Pérez was the league's top scorer in both 1970–71 and 1972–73 seasons. Breogán coexisted with another team from Lugo called La Casera for a while, and even though La Casera had more local players, Breogán was the whole city's preferred team because Lugo's population felt a lot more identified with the club. La Casera disappeared and a few of their players signed for Breogán afterwards.

Breogán had a bit of a rollercoaster journey between the top division and the lower leagues, and got promoted back to the now named Liga ACB in the 1983–84 season, and qualified for the Korać Cup after finishing in the sixth position in 1984–85, playing against Red Star Belgrade, Pallacanestro Varese and ASVEL Basket. Manel Sánchez, from Lugo, was the star of this team. The club got relegated in the 1986–87 season after the referees allowed Oximesa Granada to score the winning free throws despite the clock having run out of time before the foul. The incidents caused the closure of Breogán's arena and Breo had to play the remaining games in A Coruña, where it got relegated despite Lugo population's massive support filling up an arena 100 km away from home and Manel Sánchez being the league's top scorer. Season 1988–89 saw the club's return to Liga ACB once again, where they stayed until 1995, when it lost to against Valvi Girona and became relegated to Liga EBA. During this time, Manel Sánchez left the club for good, and Olympic medallist Velimir Perasović was brought as his substitute for the 1992–93 season, its first in the new arena, Pazo dos Deportes.

In 1999 the club returned once again to Liga ACB, an era which would last seven years. Great players like Anthony Bonner, former EuroLeague champion Nikola Lončar or Devin Davis played for the club during that time. They earned a European spot in the 2003–04 season, but ULEB Cup organisers decided to invite Real Madrid instead, even though they finished in a lower position than Breogán. 2004–05 season was defined by the arrival of one of Liga ACB's most talented players in the 21st century, Charlie Bell. His impressive performances for Breo earned him a move to the NBA for the following season. In the 2005–06 season, Breogán was the last qualified in the table despite having players such as Pete Mickeal or Alfonso Reyes and was relegated to LEB Oro in which would become the club's biggest absence from the top tier – 12 years -.

The club got in a very bad financial state, and was close to disappearing in the early 2010s. This became aggravated by the exit of former chairman Raúl López to become chairman at Obradoiro CAB, a move which kickstarted the rivalry between the two Galician sides. Obradoiro had only been at the Liga ACB for two season in their entire history when that happened. After failing to get promotion for many years, a playoff final loss against Club Ourense Baloncesto in 2015 the club went up by winning the LEB Oro in 2017–18. Breogán signing Ray McCallum Jr. mid-season wasn't enough to secure safety and were relegated with only 9 games out of 34 games. In 2021, Breogán were promoted to the top tier of Spanish basketball once again after beating Granada in the final. Breogán lost away from home in the first game but managed to win the second one at home and the final one in the Andalusian city.

Breogán made a brilliant start to the 2021/22 season. After winning the Galician Cup against rivals Obradoiro CAB, they won their first two Liga ACB games and visited FC Barcelona Bàsquet as leaders. Although a defeat there would mean they were no longer at the top of the table, they completed a tremendous first half of the league, qualifying for the Copa del Rey de Baloncesto for the first time in over 30 years, in which they suffered a narrow defeat against finalists Real Madrid Baloncesto. In January, head coach Paco Olmos decided to leave the club following an offer from relegation-bound CB San Pablo Burgos and was substituted by Veljko Mršić. Breogán's push to make it to the play-offs was hampered by star-man Džanan Musa's injury against Bàsquet Manresa. Trae Bell-Haynes got injured one week later as well, which resulted in Breogán being out of Play-off contention, although they were always far from being involved in a relegation battle. Džanan Musa became one of Breogán's most legendary players in the 2021–22 season and won Liga ACB's MVP award for the season, earning a move to Real Madrid.

Despite not being able to win the Basketball Champions League qualifiers at the beginning of the 2022–23 season, the Galicians managed to have another successful season, led by coach Veljko Mršić, despite maintaining only three players from the successful 2021–22 season, Erik Quintela, Sergi Quintela and Marko Luković. Key additions like Ethan Happ, Scott Bamforth, Toni Nakić and Justus Hollatz, who would later become a World Champion with Germany helped them to achieve a 10th-place finish in the Liga ACB and direct qualification to the 2023–24 edition of the Basketball Champions League, including a sweep against Galician rivals Obradoiro CAB and a 96–72 win against Real Madrid, led by former Breogán player Džanan Musa.

Breogán has had to face a massive rebuild again for the 2023–24 season, even though this time it was the club who chose not to offer some players a new deal. Veljko Mršić extended his contract as head coach, and club captains and local players Erik Quintela and Sergi Quintela stayed, alongside Sergi García, Toni Nakić and Stefan Momirov. New signings included former Bayern players Zan Mark Sisko and Matej Rudan, former ASVEL player Anthony Polite, the Italian rising star Mouhamet Diouf, Lithuanian Matas Jogėla and Martynas Sajus, the Argentinian center Juan Fernández and former Joventut captain Albert Ventura, but a lot of setbacks quickly started to happen. Toni Nakić got seriously injured in pre-season, and his replacement Dimitrios Agravanis left the club injured having played just two games, Zan Mark Sisko decided to leave for personal reasons after the first Liga ACB game against Baskonia and got replaced by Conner Frankamp and Anthony Polite suffered an adductor injury which also got him sidelined for a few weeks. Their ACB League struggles kept going for the rest of 2023 despite the improvement given by Justin Anderson's two-month stint in Lugo before leaving for Valencia Basket. On 22 December 2023, the club announced the signing of 9-year NBA veteran Ben McLemore, who had left Greek side AEK B.C. a few days before.

Bursaspor Basketbol, Hapoel Holon B.C. and current Champions Telekom Baskets Bonn were Breogán's rivals in Group F of the Basketball Champions League, in which the Galician club won all three home games and lost their three away games, finishing the group in 3rd place after all the teams finished with a 3–3 record, advancing to the play-in stage, in which they will face Turkish outfit Pinar Karsiyaka. On May 10, 2024, they secured safety in the Liga ACB by defeating MoraBanc Andorra.

== Sponsorship naming ==
Club Baloncesto Breogán has several denominations through the years due to its sponsorship:

- Breogán Lugo 1966–69
- Breogán Fontecelta 1969–73
- Breogán Lugo 1973–75
- Breogán La Casera 1975–76
- Breogán Lugo 1976–79
- Breogán Deportes Bourio 1979–80
- Breogán Stilton 1980–81
- Breogán Internacional de Seguros 1981–82
- Breogán Caixa Galicia 1982–86
- Leche Río Breogán 1986–89
- DYC Breogán 1989–94
- DYC Lugo 1994–95
- Leche Río Breogán 1995–98
- Breogán Universidade 1998–2001
- Leche Río Breogán 2001–12
- CB Breogán Lugo 2011–13
- Ribeira Sacra Breogán 2014–2015
- Cafés Candelas Breogán 2015–2019
- Leche Río Breogán 2019–21
- Río Breogán 2021–present

== Rivalries ==
Breogán has had different rivals throughout its history. Breogán's biggest rival during its first decades of existence was CB OAR Ferrol, which disappeared in 1996. Club Ourense Baloncesto was a rival as well, especially during the 2014–15 season in which they eliminated Breogán in the playoff finals to go back to the Liga ACB – although they couldn't materialise their promotion due to – as well as Básquet Coruña, a team they faced quite a lot of times during Breogán's tenures in the 2nd tier during the 2010s.

Obradoiro CAB, in Santiago de Compostela, brought to the Liga ACB after a long judicial process, have opposed Breogán since the early 2010s. I n 2009, Raúl López, former Breogán chairman, left the club in a very bad financial state, becoming Obradoiro's chairman in 2010. This action offended Breogán fans, initiating the rivalry. Now, Breogán and Obradoiro both are in Liga ACB and face each other in the Galician Derby.

Former Breogán's head coach Paco Olmos' departure to San Pablo Burgos in January 2022 also kicked off a bit of a rivalry between both fanbases, although it soon went away after San Pablo Burgos' relegation in May 2022 and Paco Olmos being sacked later that year.

== Players ==
=== Current roster ===
Note: Flags indicate national team eligibility at FIBA-sanctioned events. Players may hold other non-FIBA nationalities not displayed.

Río Breogán roster
Players
Coaches

Pos.	No.	Nat.	Name	Ht.	Age
F	00	(Spain)	Vicedo, Édgar	2.04 m (6 ft 8 in)	32 – 24 August 1994
F/C	2	(Montenegro)	Ilić, Aleksa	2.04 m (6 ft 8 in)	30 – 17 September 1996
G/F	5	(United States)	Brown, Tevin	1.96 m (6 ft 5 in)	28 – 23 September 1998
G	9	(Spain)	Peris, Josep	1.92 m (6 ft 4 in)	26 – 8 August 2000
SG	10	(Spain)	Alonso, Francis	1.91 m (6 ft 3 in)	30 – 25 May 1996
F	11	(Dominican Republic)	Garcia, Andersson	2.01 m (6 ft 7 in)	26 – 23 August 2000
G/F	17	(Serbia)	Aranitović, Aleksandar	1.95 m (6 ft 5 in)	28 – 24 January 1998
PG	19	(Croatia)	Mavra, Dominik	1.95 m (6 ft 5 in)	32 – 15 June 1994
C	22	(Croatia)	Branković, Danko	2.17 m (7 ft 1 in)	26 – 5 November 2000
PG	23	(Spain)	Quintela, Erik	1.86 m (6 ft 1 in)	35 – 17 August 1991
F	37	(Serbia)	Andrić, Mihajlo	2.01 m (6 ft 7 in)	32 – 4 January 1994
PG	45	(United States)	Bolton, Rasir	1.90 m (6 ft 3 in)	27 – 27 September 1999
F/C	88	(Democratic Republic of the Congo)	Kasibabu, Jonathan	2.04 m (6 ft 8 in)	30 – 24 April 1996

Head coach

- (Spanish Basketball Federation) Luis Casimiro

Assistant coach(es)

- (Spanish Basketball Federation) Fernán Varela
- (Spanish Basketball Federation) Víctor Pérez

Legend

- (C) Team captain
- Injured

- Roster
- Transactions
Updated: September 14, 2026

=== Depth chart ===
Pos.	Starting 5	Bench 1	Bench 2
C	Danko Branković	Aleksa Ilić	Jonathan Kasibabu †
PF	Mihajlo Andrić	Andersson Garcia
SF	Aleksandar Aranitović	Édgar Vicedo †
SG	Francis Alonso †	Tevin Brown *	Josep Peris †
PG	Dominik Mavra	Rasir Bolton *	Erik Quintela †

Notes: Blue † – homegrown player; (Note: A homegrown player is a player that played for at least three years before the age of 20 on a Spanish team. In Liga ACB, the team must register at least four homegrown players in rosters of 10–12 players or at least three homegrown players in rosters of 8–9 players. In Champions League, the team must register at least five homegrown players in rosters of 11–12 players or at least four homegrown players in rosters of 10 players.) Red * – overseas player; (Note: An overseas player is a player from outside EEA, FIBA Europe or ACP states. In Liga ACB, the team may register at most two overseas players. In Champions League, the team did not have any limitations regarding the number of overseas players.) Green ‡ – youth player (Note: In Liga ACB, the team may register under-22 players linked to the youth system.)

== Season by season ==
Season	Tier	Division	Pos.	W–L	Copa del Rey	Other cups		European competitions		
1968–69	2	2ª División	3rd	15–7						
1969–70	2	2ª División	3rd	15–5						
1970–71	1	1ª División	9th	9–15						
1971–72	1	1ª División	11th	5–1–18						
1972–73	1	1ª División	13th	12–1–19	Round of 16					
1973–74	1	1ª División	15th	6–22						
1974–75	2	2ª División	2nd	24–8						
1975–76	1	1ª División	10th	14–18						
1976–77	1	1ª División	12th	2–20	First round					
1977–78	2	2ª División	9th	13–2–15						
1978–79	3	2ª División								
1979–80	4	3ª División	12th							
1980–81	3	2ª División	6th	12–10						
1981–82	3	2ª División								
1982–83	3	2ª División								
1983–84	2	1ª División B	2nd	18–8						
1984–85	1	Liga ACB	6th	12–20		Copa Príncipe	R3			
1985–86	1	Liga ACB	7th	11–21		Copa Príncipe	QF	3 Korać Cup	GS	0–6
1986–87	1	Liga ACB	15th	13–19		Copa Príncipe	SF			
1987–88	2	1ª División B	5th	29–15						
1988–89	1	Liga ACB	21st	20–25	First round					
1989–90	1	Liga ACB	17th	22–18	Quarter-finalist					
1990–91	1	Liga ACB	16th	17–23	First round					
1991–92	1	Liga ACB	20th	15–22	First round					
1992–93	1	Liga ACB	17th	12–19	Third round					
1993–94	1	Liga ACB	16th	10–20	Third round					
1994–95	1	Liga ACB	20th	12–31	First round					
1995–96	3	Liga EBA	3rd	24-12						
1996–97	2	LEB	3rd	22–13		Copa Príncipe	4th			
1997–98	2	LEB	3rd	19–12		Copa Príncipe	QF			
1998–99	2	LEB	1st	26–10		Copa Príncipe	QF			
1999–00	1	Liga ACB	13th	15–19						
2000–01	1	Liga ACB	11th	13–21						
2001–02	1	Liga ACB	13th	13–21						
2002–03	1	Liga ACB	9th	17–17						
2003–04	1	Liga ACB	15th	14–20						
2004–05	1	Liga ACB	11th	13–21						
2005–06	1	Liga ACB	18th	11–23						
2006–07	2	LEB	9th	17–17						
2007–08	2	LEB Oro	4th	26–11		Copa Príncipe	C			
2008–09	2	LEB Oro	6th	23–13						
2009–10	2	LEB Oro	8th	20–18						
2010–11	2	LEB Oro	5th	21–20						
2011–12	2	LEB Oro	8th	20–18						
2012–13	2	LEB Oro	6th	16–15						
2013–14	2	LEB Oro	4th	20–12						
2014–15	2	LEB Oro	3rd	27–13		Copa Príncipe	RU			
2015–16	2	LEB Oro	7th	19–16						
2016–17	2	LEB Oro	4th	27–15						
2017–18	2	LEB Oro	1st	28–6		Copa Princesa	C			
2018–19	1	Liga ACB	18th	9–25						
2019–20	2	LEB Oro	8th (Note: Season curtailed due to the COVID-19 pandemic.)	15–9						
2020–21	2	LEB Oro	2nd	25–10		Copa Princesa	C			
2021–22	1	Liga ACB	11th	16–18	Quarter-finalist					
2022–23	1	Liga ACB	10th	14–20				3 Champions League	QR	0–1
2023–24	1	Liga ACB	16th	11–23				3 Champions League	PI	4–5
2024–25	1	Liga ACB	13th	13–21						
2025–26	1	Liga ACB	11th	15–19						
2026–27	1	Liga ACB						3 Champions League	QR	2–1

== Trophies and awards ==
=== Trophies ===
- LEB Oro: (2)
  - 1999, 2018
- Copa Princesa: (3)
  - 2008, 2018, 2021

=== Records ===
- 23 seasons in the top division
  - 6 in Primera División
  - 17 in Liga ACB
- 1 participation in Korać Cup
  - 1985–86 season: eliminated in quarterfinals group stage
- 2 participations in Basketball Champions League
  - 2022–23 season: eliminated in the qualifying rounds
  - 2023–24 season: group stages.

=== Individual awards ===
ACB MVP

- Džanan Musa – 2021–22

All-ACB Team

- Charlie Bell – 2004–05
- Džanan Musa – 2021–22

ACB Top Scorer

- Alfredo Pérez – 1971 (27,1)
- Alfredo Pérez – 1973 (23,2)
- Bob Fullarton – 1976 (30,3)
- Velimir Perasović – 1993 (24,5)
- Charlie Bell – 2005 (27,0)
- Džanan Musa – 2022 (20,1)

ACB Three Point Shootout Champion

- Jacobo Odriozola – 2002
- Nebojša Bogavac – 2005

All-LEB Oro Team

- Anthony Winchester – 2013
- Álex Llorca – 2015
- Jeff Xavier – 2016

== Notable players ==
Note: Flags indicate national team eligibility at FIBA-sanctioned events. Players may hold other non-FIBA nationalities not displayed.

Criteria

To appear in this section a player must have either:

- Set a club record or won an individual award while at the club
- Played at least one official international match for their national team at any time
- Played at least one official NBA match at any time.

- (Spain) Sergi García
- (Spain) Alfons Alzamora
- (Spain) José Miguel Antúnez
- (Spain) Alfonso Martínez
- (Spain) Alfonso Reyes
- (Spain) Sergi Vidal
- (Spain) Salva Arco
- (Argentina) Jorge Racca
- (Bosnia and Herzegovina) Džanan Musa
- (Bosnia and Herzegovina) Sabahudin Bilalović
- (Canada) Trae Bell-Haynes
- (Croatia) Velimir Perasović
- (Cape Verde) Betinho
- (Denmark) Kevin Larsen
- (Dominican Republic) James Feldeine
- (Democratic Republic of the Congo) Jordan Sakho
- (Finland) Roope Ahonen
- (France) Joseph Gomis
- (Germany) Justus Hollatz
- (Italy) Marco Carraretto
- (Montenegro) Nebojša Bogavac
- (Montenegro) Đuro Ostojić
- (Netherlands) Roeland Schaftenaar
- (Norway) Torgeir Bryn
- (Panama) Rubén Garcés
- (Serbia) Nikola Lončar
- (Ukraine) Volodymyr Gerun
- (United States) Jeff Adrien
- (United States) Tanoka Beard
- (United States) Charlie Bell
- (United States) Anthony Bonner
- (United States) Devin Davis
- (United States) James Donaldson
- (United States) Greg Foster
- (United States) Claude Gregory
- (United States) Tharon Mayes
- (United States) Ben McLemore
- (United States) Pete Mickeal
- (United States) Sam Pellom
- (United States) Linton Townes
- (United States) Tyler Kalinoski
- (United States) Ethan Happ
