= Santiago Aldama =

Spanish basketball player (born 1968)

Personal information
- Born: 7 December 1968 (age 57) Quel, La Rioja, Spain
- Listed height: 2.13 m (7 ft 0 in)
- Listed weight: 108 kg (238 lb)

Career information
- NBA draft: 1990: undrafted
- Playing career: 1987–2003
- Position: Center

Career history
- 1987–1990: CB Zaragoza
- 1990–1991: Huesca La Magia
- 1991–1994: CB Zaragoza
- 1994–1995: CB Valladolid
- 1995–1997: Gran Canaria
- 1997: CN Helios Zaragoza
- 1997-1998: FC Porto
- 1998-2000: CN Helios Zaragoza
- 2000-2001: Drac Inca
- 2001-2003: Club Ourense Baloncesto

Santiago Aldama Alesón (born 7 December 1968) is a Spanish former professional basketball player. He competed in the men's tournament at the 1992 Summer Olympics.

He is the father of current NBA player Santi Aldama.
