= Jimmy Oliver (basketball) =

American basketball player (born 1969)

Personal information
- Born: July 12, 1969 (age 57) Menifee, Arkansas, U.S.
- Listed height: 6 ft 5 in (1.96 m)
- Listed weight: 205 lb (93 kg)

Career information
- High school: Morrilton (Morrilton, Arkansas)
- College: Purdue (1988–1991)
- NBA draft: 1991: 2nd round, 39th overall pick
- Drafted by: Cleveland Cavaliers
- Playing career: 1991–2007
- Position: Shooting guard / small forward
- Number: 24, 27, 33, 11

Career history
- 1991–1992: Cleveland Cavaliers
- 1992–1993: Sioux Falls Skyforce
- 1993: Pescanova Ferrol
- 1993–1994: Boston Celtics
- 1994–1995: Baloncesto Salamanca
- 1995: Rockford Lightning
- 1995–1996: San Diego Wildcards
- 1996: Oklahoma City Cavalry
- 1996: SLUC Nancy
- 1996–1997: Oklahoma City Cavalry
- 1997: Toronto Raptors
- 1997: Quad City Thunder
- 1997: Washington Wizards
- 1997–1998: Ciudad de Huelva
- 1998–1999: Ducato Siena
- 1999: Phoenix Suns
- 1999–2000: Iraklio
- 2000–2003: Maroussi
- 2003–2004: Dynamo Moscow
- 2004–2005: Split
- 2005–2006: Union Olimpija
- 2006–2007: Apollon Patras

Career highlights
- FIBA Saporta Cup champion (2001); FIBA Saporta Cup Finals MVP (2001); FIBA Saporta Cup Finals Top Scorer (2001); 2× Greek League All-Star (2001, 2002); Slovenian League champion (2006); Slovenian Cup winner (2006); Slovenian Super Cup winner (2005); Galician Cup winner (1993); First-team All-Big Ten (1991); Mr. Basketball of Arkansas (1987)
- Stats at NBA.com
- Stats at Basketball Reference

Jimmy Allen Oliver (born July 12, 1969) is an American former professional basketball player who played several seasons in the National Basketball Association (NBA). He was selected by the Cleveland Cavaliers in the second round (39th pick overall) of the 1991 NBA draft.

== College career ==
Jimmy "Slice" Oliver attended Community College for one year and then transferred to Purdue University, located in West Lafayette, Indiana and played under head coach Gene Keady. The 6'6", 208 lb guard-forward appeared in 31 games in his sophomore season, playing behind Center Steve Scheffler and alongside guard Matt Painter. He averaged 5.3 points while averaging 18.2 minutes per game in his first eligible season.

Jimmy started his junior season out receiving more minutes and improved his shooting percentage to nearly 50%, while also improving his points average to 8 a game. He helped lead the Boilers to a 2nd-place finish in the Big Ten Conference and to the Second Round of the NCAA Tournament with a 22–8 record.

Averaging 19.2 points a game during his senior year, fourth in the conference, and owning an .861 free throw percentage to lead the conference, he was an All-Big Ten First Team selection. Jimmy led Purdue to a second straight NCAA Tournament appearance. He finished his college career with a 40.6% accuracy from 3-point land. Jimmy led the Boilers in assists (89) and minutes per game (35.4) in his senior season. He played his last collegiate game in the NABC All-America Game at the 1991 NCAA Final Four, where he recorded a game-high 25 points.

== Professional career ==
Oliver was selected in the second round with the 39th pick by the Cleveland Cavaliers in the 1991 NBA draft. Oliver played his rookie season for the Cavaliers, averaging 3.6 ppg in 27 games. After being invited to the Detroit Pistons' pre-season camp, he joined the CBA for the 1992–93 season, where he averaged 17.3 ppg in 15 games. After one season in the CBA, Oliver returned to the NBA for the 1993–1994 season. He played for the Boston Celtics, where he averaged 4.9 ppg and started six of the 44 games he played. After leaving the league for two seasons, he returned for the expansion draft, where he played a season with the Toronto Raptors for the 1996–97 season. He finished his last two NBA seasons with the Washington Bullets (1997–98) and the Phoenix Suns (1998–99). Playing on five different NBA teams throughout five seasons, he played in a total of 78 games (14 starts) and scored 331 points with 34% three point and .772% free throw accuracy.

After his NBA tenure, Jimmy Oliver played for several European clubs, including the Greek club Maroussi Athens; he won the FIBA Saporta Cup with them in 2001. He scored 31 points in the final match against Chalon.

Earlier, he had won the 1993 Copa Galicia, with Pescanova Ferrol, of Spain; in 2006, he led KK Olimpija to both the Slovenian League and Slovenian Cup titles.

== National team career ==
During the NBA lockout, Jimmy played for the US national team in the 1998 FIBA World Championship, teamed up with the likes of another former Boilermaker, Brad Miller. Jimmy Oliver was the leading scorer of Team USA averaging 11.8 points per game, leading them to the bronze medal.
