= Roope Ahonen =

Finnish basketball player (born 1990)

Personal information
- Born: 12 June 1990 (age 34); Salo, Finland
- Listed height: 6 ft 1.75 in (1.87 m)
- Listed weight: 186 lb (84 kg)

Career information
- NBA draft: 2012: undrafted
- Playing career: 2007–present
- Position: Point guard
- Number: 8

Career history
- 2007–2009: Torpan Pojat
- 2009–2012: Vilpas Vikings
- 2012–2013: Solna Vikings
- 2013–2014: Borås Basket
- 2014–2015: Bisons Loimaa
- 2015–2017: Kolossos Rodou
- 2017–2018: Ourense
- 2018–2019: Oviedo
- 2019–2021: Breogán
- 2021–2023: Vilpas Vikings

Career highlights
- LEB Oro champion (2021); Copa Del Reina champion (2021)

Roope Ahonen (born 12 June 1990) is a Finnish former basketball player.

== Professional career ==
In the season 2014–2015 Ahonen played in the VTB with Bisons Loimaa, averaging 9.8 points and 2.7 assists per game.

On 1 September 2017 he signed with Ourense of the LEB Oro. On 22 July 2018 he signed with Liberbank Oviedo Baloncesto of the LEB Oro.

On 28 October 2023 His number 8 jersey was retired by Salon Vilpas

== Career statistics ==
=== National team ===
Team	Tournament	Pos.	GP	PPG	RPG	APG
Finland	EuroBasket 2015	16th	7	3.4	0.6	1.0
Finland	EuroBasket 2017	11th	6	0.7	0.5	0.2
