= 1992 Copa del Rey de Baloncesto =

The 1992 Copa del Rey was the 56th edition of the Spanish basketball Cup. It was organized by the ACB and its Final Eight was played in Granada, in the Palacio de Deportes between March 3 and 6, 1992.

This edition was played by the 24 teams of the 1991–92 ACB season. The four first qualified teams of the previous season qualified directly to the Final Eight while teams 5 to 8 joined the competition in the third round.

== First round ==
Teams #2 played the second leg at home.

Team 1	Agg.	Team 2	1st leg	2nd leg	
Coren Orense	147–185	Unicaja Ronda	68–94	79–91	{{{8}}}
Júver Murcia	183–156	Ferrys Llíria	101–78	82–78	{{{8}}}
Huesca La Magia	147–136	TDK Manresa	67–73	80–63	{{{8}}}
Caja San Fernando	146–147	Valvi Girona	78–79	68–68	{{{8}}}
DYC Breogán	116–136	Elosúa León	52–72	64–64	{{{8}}}
Pamesa Valencia	161–155	OAR Ferrol	68–67	73–68	{{{8}}}
CB Gran Canaria	151–154	CB Granollers	75–75	76–79	{{{8}}}
Mayoral Maristas	152–159	Granada	83–74	72–85	{{{8}}}

== Second round ==
Team 1	Agg.	Team 2	1st leg	2nd leg	
Unicaja Ronda	161–168	Júver Murcia	92–79	69–89	{{{8}}}
Huesca La Magia	153–162	Valvi Girona	74–72	79–90	{{{8}}}
Elosúa León	161–151	Pamesa Valencia	76–74	85–77	
CB Granollers	173–135	Granada	84–54	89–81	

== Third round ==
Team 1	Agg.	Team 2	1st leg	2nd leg
Real Madrid Asegurator	164–153	Júver Murcia	79–78	85–74
Collado Villalba	131–147	Valvi Girona	71–83	60–64
Elosúa León	167–159	Fórum Valladolid	83–75	84–83
CAI Zaragoza	168–155	CB Granollers	87–77	81–78

== Final Eight Bracket ==
Quarterfinals; March 5 and 6
Estudiantes Caja Postal	82
Real Madrid Asegurator	80
Montigalà Joventut	77
Valvi Girona	71
FC Barcelona	67
Elosúa León	62
Taugrés Baskonia	83
CAI Zaragoza	87

Semifinals; March 7
Estudiantes Caja Postal	78
Montigalà Joventut	77
FC Barcelona	77
CAI Zaragoza	81

Final; March 8
Estudiantes Caja Postal	61
CAI Zaragoza	56
Third place
Montigalà Joventut	83
FC Barcelona	72

== Final ==
8 March 1992
20:00 GTM+1

Boxscore

Estudiantes Caja Postal	61–56	CAI Zaragoza
Scoring by half: 31–31, 30–25
Pts: Herreros 16; Rebs: Winslow 12; Asts: Martínez 4 PIR: Winslow 20		Pts: Arcega 19; Rebs: Arcega 9 Asts: Andreu, Álvarez 2 PIR: Arcega 20

Palacio de Deportes, Granada
Attendance: 7,800
Referees: Vicente Sanchís, Mateo Ramos

1992 Copa del Rey Champions

Estudiantes Caja Postal
2nd title

- MVP of the Tournament: John Pinone
