= 1994 Copa del Rey de Baloncesto =

56th edition of the Spanish basketball Cup

The 1994 Copa del Rey was the 56th edition of the Spanish basketball Cup. It was organized by the ACB and it Final Eight was played at Palacio de San Pablo, in Seville, between 3 and 6 March 1994.

This edition was played by the 20 teams of the 1993–94 ACB season. The four first qualified teams of the previous season qualified directly to the Final Eight while teams 5 to 8 joined the competition in the third round. In the draw of the first round, two teams received a bye.

== First round ==
Teams #2 played the second leg at home.

Team 1	Agg.	Team 2	1st leg	2nd leg
Valvi Girona	151–147	Argal Huesca	81–82	70–65
Cáceres CB	159–170	DYC Breogán	69–72	90–98
TDK Manresa	158–132	Júver Murcia	86–64	72–68
Pamesa Valencia	151–158	OAR Ferrol	76–78	75–80
Fórum Valladolid	156–150	Festina Andorra	84–84	66–72

== Second round ==
Team 1	Agg.	Team 2	1st leg	2nd leg
Valvi Girona	123–127	DYC Breogán	50–57	73–70
Unicaja Polti	143–138	TDK Manresa	69–67	74–71
OAR Ferrol	170–156	Fórum Valladolid	86–69	84–88

== Third round ==
Team 1	Agg.	Team 2	1st leg	2nd leg
DYC Breogán	158–169	Coren Orense	70–75	68–64
Unicaja Polti	177–176	Natwest Zaragoza	103–84	74–92
Taugrés	174–169	Elmar León	79–73	95–96
OAR Ferrol	131–128	Caja San Fernando	66–64	65–64

== Final Eight Bracket ==
Quarterfinals; March 3
Real Madrid Teka	78
Coren Orense	67
FCB Banca Catalana	74
Unicaja Polti	71
7up Joventut	71
Taugrés	79
Estudiantes Argentaria	86
OAR Ferrol	70

Semifinals; March 5
Real Madrid Teka	75
FCB Banca Catalana	81
Taugrés	97
Estudiantes Argentaria	93

Final; March 6
FCB Banca Catalana	86
Taugrés	75
Third place
Real Madrid Teka	89
Estudiantes Argentaria	79

== Final ==
The 1994 Copa del Rey Final started with 45-minutes delay due to problems in one of the rims. In the game, Tony Massebunrg (FC Barcelona) was disqualified in the first minute of the game after punching Ramón Rivas. Ten minutes later, Ken Bannister (Taugrés Baskonia) was also disqualified after attacking Quique Andreu.

6 March 1994
20:45 GTM+1

Boxscore

FC Barcelona Banca Catalana	86–75	Taugrés
Scoring by half: 40–32, 46–43
Pts: Andreu 20; Rebs: Andreu, Jiménez 8 Asts: Roberts 4		Pts: Perasović 25; Rebs: Abad 13; Asts: Laso 9

San Pablo, Seville
Attendance: 7,500
Referees: Álvaro Herrera, Miguel Ángel Betancor

1994 Copa del Rey Champions

FC Barcelona Banca Catalana
17th title

- MVP of the Tournament: Velimir Perasović
