= 1968–69 Segunda División de Baloncesto =

The 1968–69 Segunda División de Baloncesto was the ninth edition of the Spanish basketball second division.

== Regular season ==
=== Group 1 ===
Pos	Team	Pld	W	D	L	PF	PA	PD	Pts	Promotion, qualification or relegation
1	Breogán	12	10	0	2	904	624	+280	20	Qualification to second round
2	Estudiantes de Vigo	12	10	0	2	804	685	+119	20	Qualification to second round
3	Canoe	12	9	0	3	779	584	+195	18	
4	Manuel Álvarez	12	6	0	6	690	637	+53	12	Repechage
5	EyD Orense	12	3	0	9	547	788	−241	6	Repechage
6	Bazán Ferrol	12	2	0	10	667	783	−116	4	Relegation
7	Salamanca	12	2	0	10	634	924	−290	4	Relegation

Source: FEB

=== Group 2 ===
Pos	Team	Pld	W	D	L	PF	PA	PD	Pts	Promotion, qualification or relegation
1	Águilas Schweppes	12	11	0	1	794	629	+165	22	Qualification to second round
2	Fiber Urcelay	12	10	0	2	826	644	+182	20	Qualification to second round
3	Juventus	12	6	0	6	662	660	+2	12	
4	Grupo Covadonga	12	5	0	7	753	759	−6	10	Repechage
5	Patronato Ardau	12	4	1	7	682	780	−98	9	Repechage
6	Oberena	12	4	1	7	661	745	−84	9	Relegation
7	Sniace	12	1	0	11	624	785	−161	2	Relegation

Source: FEB

=== Group 3 ===
Pos	Team	Pld	W	D	L	PF	PA	PD	Pts	Promotion, qualification or relegation
1	CB Manresa	16	12	0	4	1143	903	+240	24	Qualification to second round
2	Pineda	16	12	0	4	1028	846	+182	24	Qualification to second round
3	Milsa Antorcha	16	11	0	5	951	952	−1	22	
4	Stadium Casablanca	16	9	1	6	871	849	+22	19	Repechage
5	Mollet	16	8	0	8	970	953	+17	16	Repechage
6	Reus	16	6	1	9	896	975	−79	13	Relegation
7	Roca Radiadores	16	4	2	10	822	874	−52	10	Relegation
8	Valls	16	5	0	11	811	925	−114	10	Relegation
9	Santa Coloma	16	3	0	13	853	1068	−215	6	Relegation

Source: FEB

=== Group 4 ===
Pos	Team	Pld	W	D	L	PF	PA	PD	Pts	Promotion, qualification or relegation
1	Español	18	16	0	2	1147	973	+174	32	Qualification to second round
2	Sagrada Familia	18	12	1	5	959	934	+25	25	Qualification to second round
3	Pedagogium San Fernando	18	12	0	6	1062	1027	+35	24	
4	Ripollet	18	11	0	7	1129	975	+154	22	Repechage
5	Círculo Católico Piher	18	11	0	7	1008	935	+73	22	Repechage
6	Hispano-Francés	18	10	0	8	1100	971	+129	20	Relegation
7	CN Sabadell	18	8	0	10	1051	1054	−3	16	Relegation
8	Molinar	18	5	1	12	911	1088	−177	11	Relegation
9	Layetano	18	2	1	15	858	1019	−161	5	Relegation
10	Hospitalet Pepsi	18	1	1	16	961	1210	−249	3	Relegation

Source: FEB

=== Group 5 ===
Pos	Team	Pld	W	D	L	PF	PA	PD	Pts	Promotion, qualification or relegation
1	Vallehermoso	16	15	0	1	1011	656	+355	30	Qualification to second round
2	Dimar	16	11	1	4	983	772	+211	23	Qualification to second round
3	Marcol Lanas Aragón	16	10	0	6	1010	830	+180	20	
4	Bazán Cartagena	16	9	1	6	795	711	+84	19	Repechage
5	Colegio Ateneo	16	9	1	6	846	742	+104	19	Repechage
6	Atlético Montemar	16	6	2	8	750	878	−128	14	Relegation
7	EMT Madrid	16	5	0	11	718	804	−86	10	Relegation
8	Alibérico	16	4	1	11	833	968	−135	9	Relegation
9	San Fernando	16	0	0	16	596	1181	−585	0	Relegation

Source: FEB

=== Group 6 ===
Pos	Team	Pld	W	D	L	PF	PA	PD	Pts	Promotion, qualification or relegation
1	Banesto	12	10	0	2	728	571	+157	20	Qualification to second round
2	Lanjarón	12	9	0	3	656	620	+36	18	Qualification to second round
3	Guardia de Franco	12	8	0	4	695	623	+72	16	
4	CD Málaga	12	7	0	5	650	523	+127	14	Repechage
5	Círculo de Labradores	12	4	0	8	624	699	−75	8	Repechage
6	National	12	3	1	8	601	705	−104	7	Relegation
7	Club Militar	12	0	1	11	530	743	−213	1	Relegation

Source: FEB

== Second round ==
=== Group A ===
Pos	Team	Pld	W	D	L	PF	PA	PD	Pts	Promotion, qualification or relegation
1	Breogán	5	5	0	0	352	281	+71	10	Qualification to final round
2	Fiber Urcelay	5	4	0	1	348	314	+34	8	Qualification to final round
3	Sagrada Familia	5	2	0	3	298	316	−18	4	Qualification to final round
4	CB Manresa	5	2	0	3	320	306	+14	4	
5	Lanjarón	5	1	0	4	243	312	−69	2	
6	Vallehermoso	5	1	0	4	290	322	−32	2	

Source: FEB

=== Group B ===
Pos	Team	Pld	W	D	L	PF	PA	PD	Pts	Promotion, qualification or relegation
1	Pineda	5	4	0	1	308	280	+28	8	Qualification to final round
2	Español	5	4	0	1	324	293	+31	8	Qualification to final round
3	Águilas Schweppes	5	3	0	2	333	297	+36	6	Qualification to final round
4	Estudiantes de Vigo	5	3	0	2	284	269	+15	6	
5	Dimar	5	1	0	4	249	311	−62	2	
6	Banesto	5	0	0	5	266	314	−48	0	

Source: FEB

== Final round ==
Pos	Team	Pld	W	D	L	PF	PA	PD	Pts	Promotion, qualification or relegation
1	Español	5	4	1	0	371	305	+66	9	Promoted
2	Águilas Schweppes	5	3	2	0	342	315	+27	8	Promoted
3	Fiber Urcelay	5	2	1	2	349	346	+3	5	Promotion play off
4	Pineda	5	2	0	3	312	322	−10	4	Promotion play off
5	Sagrada Familia	5	1	0	4	304	353	−49	2	
6	Breogán	5	1	0	4	330	367	−37	2	

Source: FEB

== Repechage round ==
=== Group A ===
Pos	Team	Pld	W	D	L	PF	PA	PD	Pts
1	Mollet	3	3	0	0	179	155	+24	6
2	Manuel Álvarez	3	2	0	1	170	147	+23	4
3	Huarte Chamberí	3	1	0	2	175	176	−1	2
4	Bazán Cartagena	3	0	0	3	142	188	−46	0

Source: FEB
