= Copa Príncipe de Asturias ACB =

Spanish basketball tournament

The Copa Príncipe de Asturias ACB (ACB Prince of Asturias Cup) was a basketball tournament played with teams of Liga ACB between 1986 and 1991. The 1985 tournament was called Copa de la Asociación de Clubs (Association of Clubs Cup) or Torneo de la ACB (ACB Tournament). Since the next season to its end, it was called Copa Príncipe de Asturias.

== Finals ==
Year	Host	Winner	Runner-up	Score
1985	Villanueva de la Serena	Caja Álava	CAI Zaragoza	93–85
1986	Alcora	Estudiantes Caja Postal	Cacaolat Granollers	89–82
1987	Vigo	Ram Joventut	TDK Manresa	99–80
1988	Palma de Mallorca	FC Barcelona	Real Madrid	92–90
1989	Ferrol	Ram Joventut	FC Barcelona	84–80
1990	A Coruña	Montigalà Joventut	Fórum Filatélico Valladolid	72–52

== History of the Cup ==
=== 1985 edition ===
The first edition of Copa Príncipe de Asturias was played by the eliminated teams in the Round of 16 and the quarterfinals of the 1984–85 ACB season. Caja de Álava won the tournament, which was its first official title in the club history. The final was played in Villanueva de la Serena.

The first round was played between teams eliminated in the Round of 16. The quarterfinalists of Liga ACB joined in the second round. A team would be eliminated if it loses two rounds. If the number of teams in a round was odd, a team would receive a bye to the next round.

==== First round ====
Team #1	Agg.	Team #2	1st leg	2nd leg
RCD Español	150–182	Saski Baskonia	87–77	63–105
CB Valladolid	172–168	OAR Ferrol	92–90	80–78

==== Second round ====
Team #1	Agg.	Team #2	1st leg	2nd leg
OAR Ferrol	202–199	CB Breogán	80–70	122–129
Saski Baskonia	181–178	CB Zaragoza	91–85	90–93
RCD Español	172–174	Granollers EB	82–80	90–94
CB Estudiantes	161–148	CB Valladolid	77–75	84–73

==== Third round ====
Team #1	Agg.	Team #2	1st leg	2nd leg
CB Breogán	191–210	CB Zaragoza	93–107	98–103
Saski Baskonia	192–190	CB Valladolid	108–101	84–89
Granollers EB	173–211	CB Estudiantes	77–85	96–123
OAR Ferrol received a bye

==== Fourth round ====
Team #1	Agg.	Team #2	1st leg	2nd leg
CB Estudiantes	194–212	CB Zaragoza	105–104	89–108
Granollers EB	194–189	OAR Ferrol	97–97	97–92
Saski Baskonia received a bye

==== Semifinals and final ====
Semifinals
Granollers EB	92	84
CB Zaragoza	92	98
Saski Baskonia	99	79
CB Estudiantes	90	91

Finals
CB Zaragoza	85
Saski Baskonia	93

=== 1986 edition ===
This was the first edition with the name of Copa Príncipe de Asturias. Like in the previous season, the tournament was played by the losers in the two first rounds of the 1985–86 ACB season. Teams were divided in two groups of four teams with a double round-robin competition. The two first qualified teams played the semifinals.

Finally, CB Estudiantes won the title in Pabellón Polideportivo Municipal de L'Alcora.

#	Teams	W	L	PF	PA
1	CB Valladolid	4	2	530	496
2	OAR Ferrol	3	3	495	498
3	RCD Español	3	3	518	518
4	CB Breogán	2	4	505	536

#	Teams	W	L	PF	PA
1	CB Estudiantes	5	1	594	544
2	Granollers EB	5	1	564	533
3	Bàsquet Manresa	1	5	533	565
4	Saski Baskonia	1	5	557	606

Semifinals
CB Estudiantes	85
OAR Ferrol	74
Granollers EB	91
CB Valladolid	85

Final
CB Estudiantes	89
Granollers EB	82

=== 1987 edition ===
The 1986–87 edition was played between the months of October and November 1986. A single round tournament was played. The final was in a neutral venue. In the first time they played the tournament, Joventut Badalona took the victory after defeating Manresa in Pabellón Municipal, Vigo and playing only the semifinal game at home.

Round of 16
RCD Español	93
Real Madrid	104
CB Zaragoza	95
Joventut Badalona	104
CB Canarias	68
CB Breogán	91
Granollers EB	88
CB Valladolid	75
Bàsquet Manresa	96
CB Peñas Huesca	75
FC Barcelona	120
CB Estudiantes	80
Cajabilbao	78
Saski Baskonia	72
CD Oximesa	87
OAR Ferrol	84

Quarterfinals
Real Madrid	84
Joventut Badalona	99
CB Breogán	100
Granollers EB	91
Bàsquet Manresa	84
FC Barcelona	75
Cajabilbao	82
CD Oximesa	83

Semifinals
Joventut Badalona	113
CB Breogán	89
Bàsquet Manresa	83
CD Oximesa	78

Final
Joventut Badalona	99
Bàsquet Manresa	80

=== 1988 edition ===
Like in the last year, the 1987–88 Copa Príncipe was played with a knockout stage format, but in double leg series from September 1987 to April 1988. The Final Four was played in single games at the Palau Municipal d'Esports Son Moix in Palma de Mallorca in April 1988. FC Barcelona won its first tournament.

Round of 16
1	CB Canarias	89	90	179
16	CB Peñas Huesca	72	93	165
8	CB Caja de Ronda	82	77	159
9	FC Barcelona	84	103	187
5	CB Collado Villalba	82	84	166
12	Joventut Badalona	107	106	213
4	CB Estudiantes	84	71	155
13	Cajabilbao	79	72	151
6	Saski Baskonia	84	77	161
11	Bàsquet Manresa	80	87	167
3	CB Valladolid	80	82	162
14	CB Zaragoza	85	82	167
7	Real Madrid	123	90	213
10	RCD Español	86	77	163
2	Granollers EB	104	89	193
15	CD Oximesa	90	91	181

Quarterfinals
CB Canarias	81	78	159
FC Barcelona	111	101	212
Joventut Badalona	97	90	187
CB Estudiantes	81	93	174
Bàsquet Manresa	97	81	178
CB Zaragoza	91	88	179
Real Madrid	90	94	184
Granollers EB	92	90	182

Semifinals
FC Barcelona	93
Joventut Badalona	86
CB Zaragoza	96
Real Madrid	111

Final
FC Barcelona	92
Real Madrid	90

=== 1989 edition ===
This edition was played between the three first qualified teams of Group A1 and the leader of Group A2 in the 1987–88 ACB season. The Cup was held at Polideportivo Municipal de A Malata in Ferrol in a Final Four format in September 1989. This edition was postponed due to the Spanish national basketball team's participation in the 1988 Olympic Games that took place in September 1988. It was ultimately decided to reschedule the tournament to the start of the 1989-90 season. However, from an official standpoint, it was still considered part of the originally intended season: 1988-89.

Semifinals
Joventut Badalona	82
Real Madrid	79
OAR Ferrol	71
FC Barcelona	78

Final
Joventut Badalona	84
FC Barcelona	80

=== 1990 edition ===
The format was similar than the 1989 edition and it was held at Pazo dos Deportes de Riazor, A Coruña in September 1990. This was the last edition of the Copa Príncipe de Asturias with teams of Liga ACB and Joventut Badalona won its third title.

Semifinals
Joventut Badalona	85
Real Madrid	67
FC Barcelona	69
CB Valladolid	70

Final
Joventut Badalona	72
CB Valladolid	52
