= CB Valladolid =

Basketball team in Castile-León, Spain

Valladolid
- Leagues: Liga ACB
- Founded: 1976
- Dissolved: 2015
- History: CB Valladolid (1976–2015)
- Arena: Polideportivo Pisuerga
- Capacity: 6,800
- Location: Valladolid, Castile-León
- Team colors: Purple and gold
- President: Sunil Bhardwaj
- Head coach: Porfirio Fisac
- Championships: 1 LEB Oro Championship
- Retired numbers: 5 Lalo García
- Website: cbvalladolid.es
Home	Away

Club Baloncesto Valladolid, S.A.D. was a professional basketball team based in Valladolid, Castile-León, Spain. CB Valladolid was member of the Asociación de Clubs de Baloncesto (ACB). Famous players that have played for the team include Arvydas Sabonis, Oscar Schmidt, John Williams, Ed O'Bannon and Panagiotis Vasilopoulos.

In 2015, the club was dissolved due to financial problems. It was replaced by the CB Ciudad de Valladolid, immediately created by the former player Mike Hansen.

== Sponsorship naming ==
CB Valladolid has received diverse trade names along its history. These are their denominations along the years:

- Impala Tours 1978–1979
- Miñón Valladolid 1979–1983
- Fórum Valladolid 1983–1992, 1993–2006
- Grupo Libro Valladolid 1992–1993
- Grupo Capitol Valladolid 2006–2008
- Blancos de Rueda Valladolid 2009–2013
- MyWigo Valladolid 2014–2015

== Season by season ==
Season	Tier	Division	Pos.	W–L	Copa del Rey	Other cups		European competitions		
1976–77	1	1ª División	11th	7–15	First round					
1977–78	2	2ª División	3rd	19–3–8						
1978–79	2	1ª División B	1st	20–2						
1979–80	1	1ª División	9th	9–1–12	Quarterfinalist			3 Korać Cup	QF	6–4
1980–81	1	1ª División	6th	13–13	Round of 16					
1981–82	1	1ª División	4th	16–1–9	Semifinalist			3 Korać Cup	QF	4–4
1982–83	1	1ª División	6th	15–11	Round of 16					
1983–84	1	Liga ACB	12th	10–20						
1984–85	1	Liga ACB	9th	16–15	Fourth position	Copa Príncipe	R3			
1985–86	1	Liga ACB	11th	12–19		Copa Príncipe	SF			
1986–87	1	Liga ACB	13th	13–18		Copa Príncipe	R16			
1987–88	1	Liga ACB	9th	14–16	Semifinalist	Copa Príncipe	R16			
1988–89	1	Liga ACB	17th	14–22	Quarterfinalist					
1989–90	1	Liga ACB	6th	26–12	Round of 16					
1990–91	1	Liga ACB	7th	23–16	Third round	Copa Príncipe	RU			
1991–92	1	Liga ACB	8th	23–15	Third round			3 Korać Cup	SF	10–4
1992–93	1	Liga ACB	18th	11–20	Third round			3 Korać Cup	R2	1–1
1993–94	1	Liga ACB	19th (Note: Remained in ACB due to the resign of CB Cajabilbao to promote.)	11–22	Second round					
1994–95	1	Liga ACB	11th	19–19						
1995–96	1	Liga ACB	16th	15–23						
1996–97	1	Liga ACB	15th	15–22						
1997–98	1	Liga ACB	9th	16–18	Semifinalist					
1998–99	1	Liga ACB	13th	13–21				3 Korać Cup	R32	5–3
1999–00	1	Liga ACB	12th	15–19						
2000–01	1	Liga ACB	8th	16–21						
2001–02	1	Liga ACB	10th	17–17				3 Korać Cup	GS	3–5
2002–03	1	Liga ACB	16th	11–23						
2003–04	1	Liga ACB	11th	16–18						
2004–05	1	Liga ACB	12th	13–21						
2005–06	1	Liga ACB	14th	13–21						
2006–07	1	Liga ACB	16th	12–22						
2007–08	1	Liga ACB	17th	11–23						
2008–09	2	LEB Oro	1st	25–9						
2009–10	1	Liga ACB	13th	13–21						
2010–11	1	Liga ACB	9th	18–16	Quarterfinalist					
2011–12	1	Liga ACB	18th (Note: Remained in ACB due to the resign of Menorca Bàsquet to promote.)	9–25						
2012–13	1	Liga ACB	16th	12–22						
2013–14	1	Liga ACB	18th	3–31						
2014–15	2	LEB Oro	4th	22–12						

== Home arenas ==
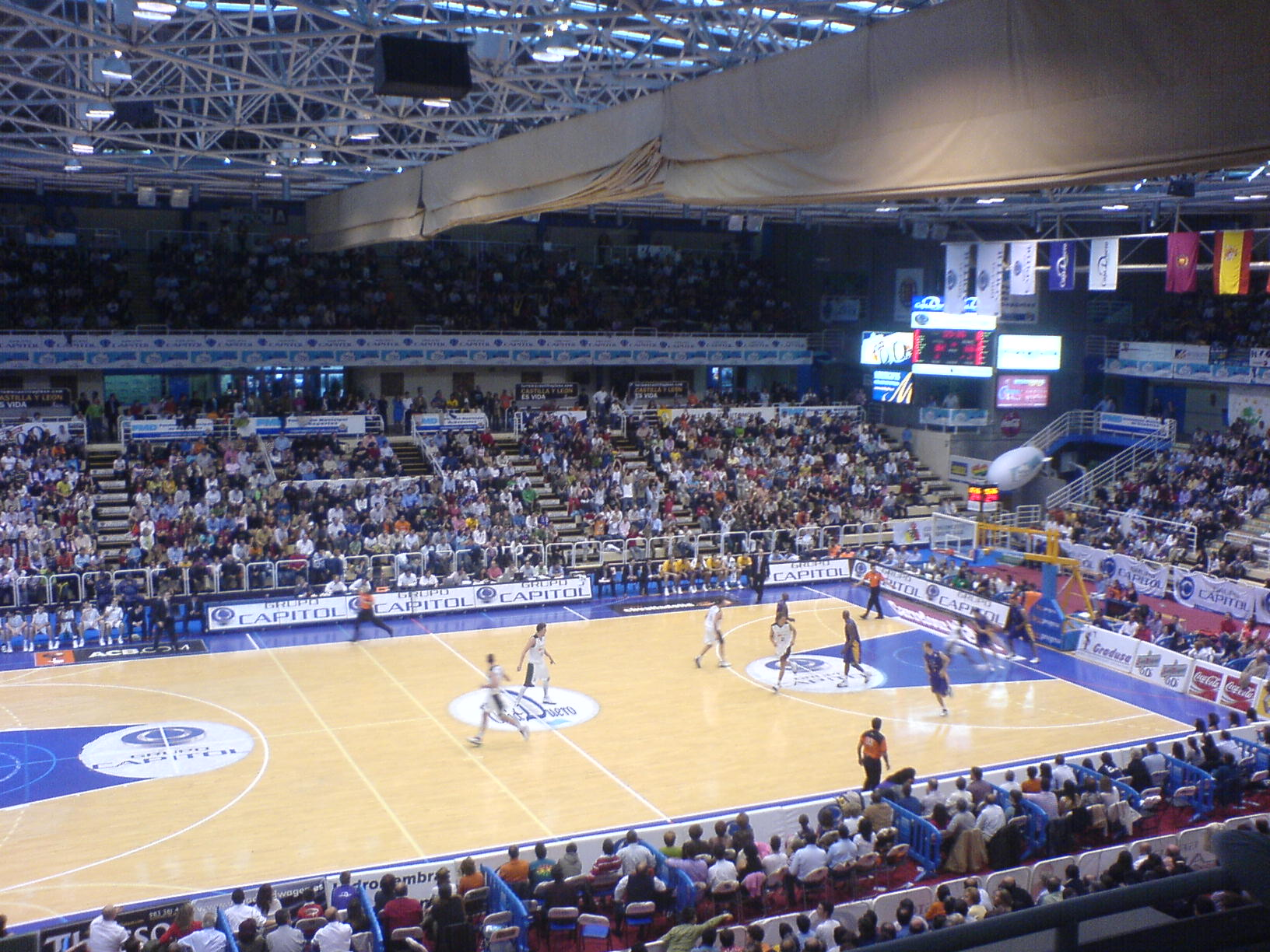
CB Valladolid in a game versus Caja San Fernando at the Polideportivo Pisuerga in 2007

- Polideportivo Huerta del Rey (1976–85)
- Polideportivo Pisuerga (1985–2015)

== Notable players ==
Note: Flags indicate national team eligibility at FIBA-sanctioned events. Players may hold other non-FIBA nationalities not displayed.

Criteria

To appear in this section a player must have either:

- Set a club record or won an individual award while at the club
- Played at least one official international match for their national team at any time
- Played at least one official NBA match at any time.

- Wendell Alexis
- Lalo García
- Alex Bradley
- A. J. Bramlett
- Anthony Bonner
- Valdemaras Chomičius
- Andrius Giedraitis
- Sam Clancy Jr.
- Fred Cofield
- Patrick Ewing Jr.
- Gabriel Fernández
- Andrei Fetisov
- Andrés Guibert
- Granger Hall
- Zendon Hamilton
- Mike Iuzzolino
- Andrew Kennedy
- Bruce Kuczenski
- Jerome Lane
- Amal McCaskill
- Carlton Myers

- Gaylon Nickerson
- Dyron Nix
- Ed O'Bannon
- Nikola Radulović
- Efthimios Rentzias
- Nacho Rodríguez
- Arvydas Sabonis
- Jeff Sanders
- Joao Santos
- Oscar Schmidt
- John Shasky
- Kevin Thompson
- Wayne Tinkle
- Andre Turner
- Tony White
- Eddie Wilkins
- John Williams
- Óscar Yebra
- Michael Young
- Darius Songaila
- Santiago Aldama

== Head coaches ==
- Paco García 2005–2006
- Javier Imbroda 2006–2008
- Porfirio Fisac 2008–2012, 2014–2015
- Luis Casimiro 2011–2012
- Roberto González 2012–2013
- Ricard Casas 2013–2014

== Honors and titles ==
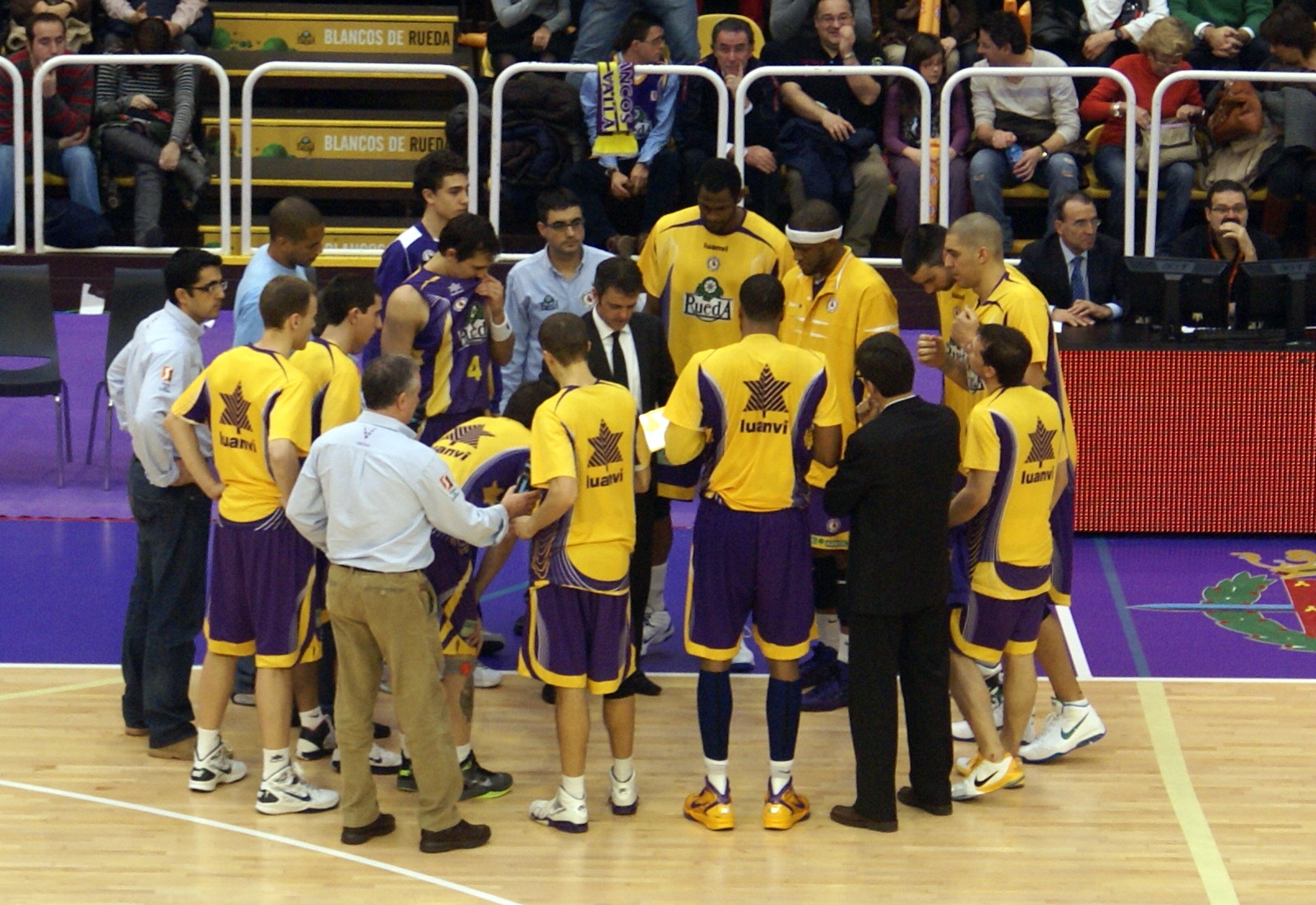
Team in half-time in January 2011

=== Trophies ===
- Liga de Verano ACB: (1)
  - 2001
- 2nd division championships: (2)
  - 1ª División B: (1)
  - 1979
  - LEB Oro: (1) 2009
- Copa Castilla y León: (8)
  - 2003, 2005, 2006, 2006, 2007, 2009, 2010, 2011

=== Individual awards ===
ACB Slam Dunk Champion

- Gaylon Nickerson – 1999

ACB Three Point Shootout Champion

- Oscar Schmidt – 1994

All LEB Oro First Team

- Mikel Uriz – 2015
