= Copa Galicia =

Spanish basketball competition

The Copa Galicia (Galicia Cup) is a basketball competition between the best teams of Galicia, Spain, organized by the Galician Basketball Federation, since 1986. CB Breogán is the last winner, in 2025.

== History ==
Year	Host	Winner	Runner-up	Score
1986	O Barco de Valdeorras	CB Breogán	Obradoiro CAB	70–67
1987	Pontevedra	CB Breogán	CB OAR Ferrol	101–87
1988	A Estrada	CB OAR Ferrol	CB Breogán	87–77
1989	Ourense	CB OAR Ferrol	Club Ourense Baloncesto	106–101
1990	Carballo	CB OAR Ferrol	Club Ourense Baloncesto	99–88
1991	O Barco de Valdeorras	CB OAR Ferrol	Basketmar Coruña	86–85
1992	O Carballiño	Club Ourense Baloncesto	CB OAR Ferrol	82–80
1993	Vilagarcía	CB OAR Ferrol	Club Ourense Baloncesto	86–82
1994	Vigo	Club Ourense Baloncesto	CB Breogán	79–69
1995	Ourense	Club Ourense Baloncesto	CB Breogán	93-77
1996	A Coruña	Básquet Coruña	Club Ourense Baloncesto	73–67
1997	Chantada	Club Ourense Baloncesto	Basket Base Club	97–77
1998	Rianxo	CB Breogán	Club Ourense Baloncesto	86–78
1999	Cambados	Club Ourense Baloncesto	CB Breogán	83–75
2000	Chantada	CB Breogán	Club Ourense Baloncesto	105–94
2001	Chantada	Club Ourense Baloncesto	CB Breogán	88–64
2002	Foz	CB Breogán	Club Ourense Baloncesto	83–76
2003	Lugo	CB Breogán	Club Ourense Baloncesto	92–73
2004	Santiago de Compostela	CB Breogán	Basket Base Club	74–57
2005	Pontevedra	CB Breogán	CB Ciudad de Pontevedra	107–78
2006	A Coruña	Club Ourense Baloncesto	CB Breogán	76–61
2007	Vigo	CB Breogán	CI Rosalía de Castro	89–57
2008	Ponteareas	CB Breogán	CI Rosalía de Castro	82–64
2009	O Porriño	CB Breogán	Obradoiro CAB	63–57
2010	Lalín	Obradoiro CAB	Club Ourense Baloncesto	72–61
2011	Noia	Obradoiro CAB	Club Ourense Baloncesto	72–70
2012	Ourense	Obradoiro CAB	Club Ourense Baloncesto	86–67
2013	Santiago de Compostela	Obradoiro CAB	CB Breogán	67–60
2014	Lugo	Obradoiro CAB	CB Breogán	74–59
2015	Ourense	Obradoiro CAB	Básquet Coruña	79–69
2016	Noia	Obradoiro CAB	Básquet Coruña	85–77
2017	Marín	Obradoiro CAB	CB Breogán	75–71
2018	Marín	CB Breogán	Obradoiro CAB	75–74
2019	Marín	Obradoiro CAB	Club Ourense Baloncesto	89–65
2021	Ferrol	CB Breogán	Obradoiro CAB	82–76
2023	Lugo	Obradoiro CAB	CB Breogán	69–68

=== Titles by team ===
Team	Winners	Runners-up	Winning years
CB Breogán	16	9	1986, 1987, 1998, 2000, 2002, 2003, 2004, 2005, 2007, 2008, 2009, 2018, 2021, 2022, 2024, 2025
Obradoiro CAB	10	5	2010, 2011, 2012, 2013, 2014, 2015, 2016, 2017, 2019, 2023
Club Ourense Baloncesto	7	11	1992, 1994, 1995, 1997, 1999, 2001, 2006
CB OAR Ferrol	5	2	1988, 1989, 1990, 1991, 1993
Básquet Coruña	1	2	1996
Basket Base Club	0	2	
CI Rosalía de Castro	0	2	
Basketmar Coruña	0	1	
CB Ciudad de Pontevedra	0	1	

== Latest editions ==
=== Vigo 2007 ===
Liga EBA stage Group A

Team	W	L	PF	PA	CHA	SAR	NAR	MAR
CB Chantada	3	0	226	200		72–67		
CB Sarria	1	2	209	211			57–68	85–71
Baloncesto Narón	1	2	187	199	63–74			
CB Peixefresco	1	2	209	221	70–80		68–56	

Liga EBA stage Group B

Team	W	L	PF	PA	XIR	GAL	SRO	EST
AD Xiria	2	1	226	219			85–74	
CB Galicia	2	1	240	231	73–68			87–80
CB San Rosendo	2	1	229	233			83–80	72–68
Estudiantes de Lugo	0	3	220	232	72–73			

LEB teams stage

Team	W	L	PF	PA	VIG	COB	COR
Ciudad de Vigo Básquet	2	0	148	133			74–61
Club Ourense Baloncesto	1	1	160	155	72–74		
Básquet Coruña	0	2	142	162		81–88	

Semi-finals
CI Rosalía de Castro	87
AD Xiria	59
CB Breogán	77
Ciudad de Vigo Básquet	55

Final
CI Rosalía de Castro	57
CB Breogán	89

=== Ponteareas 2008 ===
Liga EBA stage Group A

Team	W	L	PF	PA	EST	XIR	FER
Estudiantes de Lugo	2	0	155	137		64–57	
AD Xiria	1	1	121	127			
Ferrol CB	0	2	143	155	80–91	63–64	

LEB stage

Team	W	L	PF	PA	COB	VIG	COR
Club Ourense Baloncesto	2	0	143	116			76–62
Ciudad de Vigo Básquet	1	1	133	134	54–67		
Básquet Coruña	0	2	129	155		67–79	

Liga EBA stage Group B

Team	W	L	PF	PA	NAR	ABO	MAR	CHA
Baloncesto Narón	3	0	212	205				67–63
ABO Ourense	1	2	203	195	76–78			65–48
CB Peixefresco	1	2	193	189	66–67	69–62		
CB Chantada	1	2	171	190			60–58	

Previous knockout stage

Liga EBA stage final			EBA vs LEB game
			1	Estudiantes de Lugo	52
2	Estudiantes de Lugo	78		Ciudad de Vigo Básquet	91
3	Baloncesto Narón	71

Final Four

Semi-finals
CI Rosalía de Castro	68
Club Ourense Baloncesto	54
CB Breogán	88
Ciudad de Vigo Básquet	62

Final
CI Rosalía de Castro	64
CB Breogán	82

=== O Porriño 2009 ===
LEB teams round

Team	W	L	PF	PA	BRE	ROS	COR	COB
CB Breogán	3	0	268	236			97–78	92–83
CI Rosalía de Castro	2	1	254	243	75–79			
Básquet Coruña	1	2	226	236		68–78		
Club Ourense Baloncesto	0	3	240	273		96–101	61–80	

Final Four

Semi-finals
CB Breogán	62
CI Rosalía de Castro	52
Obradoiro CAB	88
Básquet Coruña	62

Final
CB Breogán	63
Obradoiro CAB	57

=== Lalín 2010 ===
Group A

Team	W	L	PF	PA	OBR	MAR	ROS
Obradoiro CAB	2	0	183	118			
CB Peixefresco	1	1	147	172	57–93		90–79
CI Rosalía de Castro	0	2	140	180	61–90		

Group B

Team	W	L	PF	PA	FER	COR	XIR	OBR
Ferrol CB	3	0	220	171		79–71		52–34
Básquet Coruña	2	1	243	196				
AD Xiria	1	2	221	257	66–89	66–86		
Obradoiro CAB B	0	3	167	227		51–86	82–89	

Group C

Team	W	L	PF	PA	BRE	XUV	EST
CB Breogán	2	0	191	107			
Xuventude Baloncesto	1	1	135	130	69–79		66–51
Estudiantes de Lugo	0	2	89	178	38–112		

Group D

Team	W	L	PF	PA	COB	CHA	ABO
Club Ourense Baloncesto	2	0	161	100			
CB Chantada	1	1	101	143	32–77		
ABO Ourense	0	2	134	153	68–84		66–69

Final Four

Semi-finals
Obradoiro CAB	76
Ferrol CB	59
CB Breogán	61
Club Ourense Baloncesto	70

Final
Obradoiro CAB	72
Club Ourense Baloncesto	61

=== Noia 2011 ===
A Final Four was played directly between the top four teams in Galicia.

Semi-finals
CB Breogán	79
Club Ourense Baloncesto	91
Obradoiro CAB	81
Básquet Coruña	56

Final
Club Ourense Baloncesto	70
Obradoiro CAB	72

=== Ourense 2012 ===
The format was similar as in the 2011 edition, with Obradoiro CAB as Liga ACB and the three LEB Oro teams.

Semi-finals
Club Ourense Baloncesto	74
Básquet Coruña	68
Obradoiro CAB	81
CB Breogán	77

Final
Club Ourense Baloncesto	67
Obradoiro CAB	86

=== Santiago de Compostela 2013 ===
A draw decided which two Liga ACB or LEB Oro would qualify directly to the semifinals. The other two teams will play the previous round at the court of the LEB Plata teams.

Previous round 14, 17 September
Xuventude Baloncesto	65
Club Ourense Baloncesto	68
CB Peixefresco	52
CB Breogán	78

Semifinals; 21 September
Club Ourense Baloncesto	53
Obradoiro CAB	81
CB Breogán	70
Básquet Coruña	64

Final; 22 September
Obradoiro CAB	67
CB Breogán	60

=== Lugo 2014 ===
First round
CB Peixefresco
Básquet Coruña	(Note: CB Peixefresco withdrew of the competition)
Xuventude Baloncesto	68
Club Ourense Baloncesto	75

Semifinals
CB Breogán	72
Básquet Coruña	63
Obradoiro CAB	83
Club Ourense Baloncesto	64

Final
CB Breogán	59
Obradoiro CAB	74

=== Ourense 2015 ===
Previous round 15 September
CB Peixefresco	71
CB Breogán	69
Xuventude Baloncesto	67
Básquet Coruña	84

Semifinals; 18 September
Obradoiro CAB	73
CB Peixefresco	70
Club Ourense Baloncesto	62
Básquet Coruña	67

Final; 19 September
Obradoiro CAB	79
Básquet Coruña	69

=== 2016 edition ===
The 2016 edition was played by the four LEB Oro teams, Xuventude Cambados of LEB Plata and Obradoiro CAB of Liga ACB, who directly joins the competition in the final. The semifinal and the final both will be played at Noia.

Pos	Team	Pld	W	L	PF	PA	PD	Qualification	COR	COB	PEI	BRE	XUV
1	Básquet Coruña	4	4	0	329	285	+44	Semifinal	—	72–64	—	—	86–67
2	Club Ourense Baloncesto	4	3	1	291	263	+28	Semifinal	—	—	78–73	69–66	—
3	CB Peixefresco	4	2	2	299	302	−3		65–74	—	—	84–79	—
4	CB Breogán	4	1	3	328	329	−1		89–97	—	—	—	94–79
5	Xuventude Baloncesto	4	0	4	269	337	−68		—	52–80	71–77	—	—

Source: Galician Basketball Federation

Semifinal; 24 September			Final; 25 September
			1	Básquet Coruña	77
2	Básquet Coruña	70		Obradoiro CAB	85
3	Club Ourense Bto.	61

=== 2017 edition ===
The three LEB Oro teams and LEB Plata team Xuventude Baloncesto played a preliminary round, where the two first qualified for the semifinal, played in Marín. The winner would play against Obradoiro CAB, the Galician Liga ACB.

Pos	Team	Pld	W	L	PF	PA	PD	Qualification	BRE	COB	COR	XUV
1	CB Breogán	3	3	0	296	235	+61	Semifinal	—	102–80	—	—
2	Club Ourense Baloncesto	3	2	1	261	250	+11	Semifinal	—	—	98–89	83–59
3	Básquet Coruña	3	1	2	229	247	−18		72–88	—	—	—
4	Xuventude Baloncesto	3	0	3	203	257	−54		83–106	—	61–68	—

Source: Galician Basketball Federation

Semifinal; 22 September			Final; 24 September
			1	CB Breogán	71
2	CB Breogán	86		Obradoiro CAB	75
3	Club Ourense Bto.	64

=== 2018 edition ===
LEB Oro and LEB Plata teams played the first stage, where the two first qualified ones joined the semifinal with the two Liga ACB teams.

Pos	Team	Pld	W	L	PF	PA	PD	Qualification	COR	COB	BRE
1	Básquet Coruña	2	2	0	186	161	+25	Semifinal	—	86–63	—
2	Club Ourense Baloncesto	2	1	1	156	158	−2	Semifinal	—	—	93–72
3	CB Marín Peixegalego	2	0	2	170	193	−23		98–100	—	—

Source: Galician Basketball Federation

Semi-finals
16 September – Marín
Club Ourense Baloncesto	49
Obradoiro CAB	84
16 September – Marín
Básquet Coruña	64
CB Breogán	84

Final
31 October
Obradoiro CAB	74
CB Breogán	75

=== 2019 edition ===
Five teams joined the competition, with Obradoiro CAB joining directly the final as the only ACB team of the region.

Quarter-finals
7 September – Marín
CB Marín Peixegalego	69
Básquet Coruña	63
14 September – Marín
CB Breogán	66
Club Ourense Baloncesto	88

Semi-finals
20 September - Marín
CB Marín Peixegalego	75
Club Ourense Baloncesto	95

Final
22 September - Marín
Obradoiro CAB	89
Club Ourense Baloncesto	65
