= CB Zaragoza =

Basketball team in Zaragoza, Aragón, Spain

Club Baloncesto Zaragoza
- Leagues: 1ª División
- Founded: 1981
- Location: Zaragoza, Aragón
- Team colors: Red, White
- Championships: 2 Copa del Rey
- Website: cbzaragoza.com
| Home | Away |

Club Baloncesto Zaragoza is a basketball team based in Zaragoza, Aragón, who played from 1981 to 1996 in the top Spanish league (Liga ACB since 1983) and now plays in the 1ª División, the fifth tier. Most of the years in which the team played in Liga ACB, CB Zaragoza was also known as CAI Zaragoza for sponsorship reasons.

CB Zaragoza must be not confused with Basket Zaragoza 2002, the team of the same city who plays today in Liga ACB.

== History ==
The club was founded in 1981 with the purpose of having an elite team in the city of Zaragoza with sufficient resources to play in the 1ª División.

In 1984, CAI Zaragoza achieved its first title: the Copa del Rey, after beating FC Barcelona 81–78 in Zaragoza. The second Copa del Rey arrived in 1990, when CAI Zaragoza beat Ram Joventut 76–69 in the Centro Insular de Deportes at Las Palmas.

In 1990–91 season, the club participated in the FIBA European Cup Winners' Cup and managed to reach the final in Geneva where CAI lost to PAOK by 76–72. From 1992 to 1994, the club was sponsored by Banco NatWest España. Later, in 1996, due to financial problems, CB Zaragoza sold their Liga ACB berth and the FIBA Korać Cup spot to CB Granada and the senior team was folded.

In 2001 the senior team returned to Liga EBA but only played two years. Since 2004, CB Zaragoza started to play regional competitions. It was promoted several times to Liga EBA, but always remained in the Primera División.

== Sponsorship naming ==
- Zaragoza Skol: 1981–1982
- CAI Zaragoza: 1982–1992
- NatWest Zaragoza: 1992–1994
- Amway Zaragoza: 1994–1996
- Adecco Zaragoza: 2001–2003
- Serviplem Baryval Zaragoza: 2004–2008
- 100x100 Basket Zaragoza: 2009–2013
- Universidad de Zaragoza CBZ: 2013–2015
- UniZar Azulejos Moncayo CBZ: 2015–present

== Season by season ==
| Season | Tier | Division | Pos. | W–L | Copa del Rey | Other cups | | European competitions | | |
|---|---|---|---|---|---|---|---|---|---|---|
| 1981–82 | 1 | 1ª División | 6th | 15–11 | | | | | | |
| 1982–83 | 1 | 1ª División | 4th | 16–1–9 | Round of 16 | | | 3 Korać Cup | QF | 5–3 |
| 1983–84 | 1 | Liga ACB | 4th | 20–16 | Champion | | | 3 Korać Cup | SF | 7–1 |
| 1984–85 | 1 | Liga ACB | 8th | 17–16 | | Copa Asociación | RU | 2 Cup Winners' Cup | SF | 5–3 |
| 1984–85 | 1 | Liga ACB | 8th | 17–16 | | Supercopa | RU | 2 Cup Winners' Cup | SF | 5–3 |
| 1985–86 | 1 | Liga ACB | 4th | 21–11 | Fourth position | | | 3 Korać Cup | R2 | 3–1 |
| 1986–87 | 1 | Liga ACB | 3rd | 21–12 | Semifinalist | Copa Príncipe | R16 | 3 Korać Cup | SF | 5–5 |
| 1987–88 | 1 | Liga ACB | 3rd | 18–17 | Quarterfinalist | Copa Príncipe | SF | 3 Korać Cup | QF | 3–5 |
| 1988–89 | 1 | Liga ACB | 4th | 23–18 | Semifinalist | | | 3 Korać Cup | QF | 4–4 |
| 1989–90 | 1 | Liga ACB | 9th | 20–19 | Champion | | | 3 Korać Cup | GS | 6–4 |
| 1990–91 | 1 | Liga ACB | 6th | 22–16 | Quarterfinalist | | | 2 Cup Winners' Cup | RU | 8–3 |
| 1991–92 | 1 | Liga ACB | 5th | 28–11 | Runner-up | | | 3 Korać Cup | GS | 6–4 |
| 1992–93 | 1 | Liga ACB | 7th | 19–18 | Fourth position | | | 2 European Cup | SF | 10–6 |
| 1993–94 | 1 | Liga ACB | 14th | 12–19 | Third round | | | 3 Korać Cup | GS | 2–8 |
| 1994–95 | 1 | Liga ACB | 6th | 24–17 | Runner-up | | | | | |
| 1995–96 | 1 | Liga ACB | 7th (Note: Sold its place in Liga ACB to Pamesa Valencia.) | 25–15 | Quarterfinalist | | | 3 Korać Cup | GS | 3–7 |
| 1996–01 | Did not enter any competition | | | | | | | | | |
| 2001–02 | 4 | Liga EBA | 13th | 12–22 | | | | | | |
| 2002–03 | 4 | Liga EBA | 9th | 14–16 | | | | | | |
| 2003–04 | Did not enter any competition | | | | | | | | | |
| 2004–08 | Lower divisions | | | | | | | | | |
| 2008–09 | 6 | 1ª División | | 13–13 | | | | | | |
| 2009–10 | 5 | 1ª División | 9th | 10–16 | | | | | | |
| 2010–11 | 5 | 1ª División | 3rd | 19–6 | | | | | | |
| 2011–12 | 5 | 1ª División | 1st (Note: Since 2012, the club has always declined to promote to Liga EBA.) | 25–1 | | | | | | |
| 2012–13 | 5 | 1ª División | 1st | 20–5 | | | | | | |
| 2013–14 | 5 | 1ª División | 1st | 22–4 | | | | | | |
| 2014–15 | 5 | 1ª División | 1st | 19–4 | | | | | | |
| 2015–16 | 5 | 1ª División | 1st | 17–3 | | | | | | |
| 2016–17 | 5 | 1ª División | 2nd | 16–4 | | | | | | |
| 2017–18 | 5 | 1ª División | 2nd | 10–5 | | | | | | |
| 2018–19 | 5 | 1ª División | 2nd | 16–5 | | | | | | |
| 2019–20 | 5 | 1ª División | 1st | 12–1 | | | | | | |
| 2020–21 | 4 | Tercera FEB | 5th | 5–7 | | | | | | |
| 2021–22 | 4 | Tercera FEB | 9th | 8–14 | | | | | | |
| 2022–23 | 4 | Tercera FEB | 12th | 7–21 | | | | | | |
| 2023–24 | 4 | Tercera FEB | 10th | 12–14 | | | | | | |
| 2024–25 | 4 | Tercera FEB | 2nd | 23–6 | | | | | | |
| 2025–26 | 3 | Segunda FEB | | | | | | | | |

== Trophies and awards ==
=== Trophies ===
- Spanish Cups: (2)

1984, 1990

- Saporta Cup Runners-up:

1991

=== Individual awards ===
Spanish Cup MVP

- Mark Davis – 1990
