= 1988 Copa del Rey de Baloncesto =

The 1988 Copa del Rey was the 52nd edition of the Spanish basketball Cup. It was organized by the ACB and its Final Eight was played in Valladolid, in the Pabellón Polideportivo Pisuerga between 19 and 21 December 1987.

This edition was played by the four first qualified of the 1987–88 ACB first stage.

== Qualified teams ==
Group Even

Team	Pld	W	L	PF	PA	PD	Pts
Real Madrid	14	14	0	1350	1099	+251	28
RAM Joventut	14	9	5	1328	1221	+107	23
Cajacanarias	14	8	6	1287	1286	+1	22
Magia de Huesca	14	7	7	1264	1264	0	21

Group Odd

Team	Pld	W	L	PF	PA	PD	Pts
Fórum Filatélico	14	11	3	1160	1091	+69	25
FC Barcelona	14	11	3	1299	1140	+159	25
Estudiantes Todagrés	14	9	5	1215	1142	+73	23
CAI Zaragoza	14	7	7	1182	1144	+38	21

== Bracket ==
Quarterfinals; 19 December
FC Barcelona	84
Estudiantes Todagrés	79
Fórum Filatélico	84
Magia de Huesca	76
Real Madrid	94
CAI Zaragoza	90
RAM Joventut	107
Cajacanarias	87

Semifinals; 20 December
FC Barcelona	79
Fórum Filatélico	69
Real Madrid	101
RAM Joventut	99

Final; 21 December
Real Madrid	83
FC Barcelona	84

== Final ==
A buzzer-beater of Ignacio Solozábal allowed FC Barcelona to repeat the title of Copa del Rey.

22 December 1987
20:30 GTM+1

Boxscore

FC Barcelona	84–83	Real Madrid
Scoring by half: 42–46, 42–37
Pts: Epi, Sibilio 18; Rebs: McDowell 7 Asts: Solozábal 3 PIR: Epi 17		Pts: Alexis 22; Rebs: Martín 9 Asts: Llorente, Martín 6 PIR: Martín 22

Pabellón Polideportivo Pisuerga, Valladolid
Attendance: 6,000
Referees: Jesús León Arencibia, Miguel Ángel Betancor

1988 Copa del Rey Champions

FC Barcelona
15th title
