= 1984 Copa del Rey de Baloncesto =

The 1984 Copa del Rey was the 48th edition of the Spanish basketball Cup. For the first time, it was organized by the ACB and played, for the first time in decades, with a Final Four format. Zaragoza hosted the Cup at the Palacio Municipal de Deportes.

This edition was played by the two first qualified teams of the 1983–84 ACB first stage.

== Qualified teams ==
Group Odd

Team	Pld	W	L	PF	PA	PD	Pts
Joventut Massana	14	13	1	1270	1094	+176	27
FC Barcelona	14	12	2	1423	1176	+247	26

Group Even

Team	Pld	W	L	PF	PA	PD	Pts
Real Madrid	14	12	2	1377	1092	+285	26
CAI Zaragoza	14	10	4	1241	1203	+38	24

== Bracket ==
Semifinals; 30 November
CAI Zaragoza	87
Joventut Massana	77
FC Barcelona	102
Real Madrid	100

Final; 1 December
CAI Zaragoza	81
FC Barcelona	78
Third place game
Real Madrid	88
Joventut Massana	84

== Final ==
CAI Zaragoza won its first title ever thanks to a great performance of Kevin Magee.

1 December 1983
19:00 GTM+1

Boxscore

CAI Zaragoza	81–78	FC Barcelona
Scoring by half: 38–47, 43–31
Pts: Magee 19; Rebs: Magee 13; Asts: Bosch 8 PIR: Magee 26		Pts: Epi 23; Rebs: Davis 11; Asts: Solozábal 6 PIR: Epi 22

Pabellón Municipal de Deportes, Zaragoza
Attendance: 5,000
Referees: José Marcé, José Ángel Gárate

1984 Copa del Rey champions

CAI Zaragoza
First title
