= Club Ourense Baloncesto =

- Nickname: COB
- Leagues: Primera FEB
- Founded: 1979
- Arena: Pazo dos Deportes Paco Paz
- Capacity: 6,000
- Location: Ourense, Spain
- Team colors: Blue, Navy, Yellow
- President: Jorge Bermello
- Head coach: Moncho López
- Championships: 1 Copa Príncipe; 1 Copa LEB Plata
- Website: clubourensebaloncesto.com
Home	Away

Club Ourense Baloncesto, S.A.D., more commonly referred to today by its sponsorship name of Cloud.gal Ourense Baloncesto, is a professional basketball team based in Ourense, Spain. The team currently plays in league Primera FEB.

== History ==
Founded in 1978 as Club Bosco-Salesianos, the club achieved its first success promoting to Segunda División in 1984.

Two years later, Ourense advances to Primera División B, the second tier, where it plays three seasons before promoting to Liga ACB in 1989 as champion of the league.

In the top league, COB plays during nine seasons alternating title and relegation playoffs in its first years. Finally, it is relegated to LEB Oro in the 1998 playoffs, the third series the club played in three consecutive seasons.

Ourense only played ACB again in the 2000–01 season before falling to LEB Plata, the third category in 2005. COB came back to LEB Oro in 2009 after buying the vacant spot of Cantabria Lobos.

On 2 June 2015 Ourense was promoted again to Liga ACB, fourteen years since its relegation, but could not play in the league because the assembly of the league rejected its entry. However, on 17 September 2015, the assembly of the league ratified the promotion to the 2016–17 season, independently of the position at the 2015–16 LEB Oro. However, despite this agreement, Ourense could not finally promote the next season.

== Players ==
=== Current roster ===
Note: Flags indicate national team eligibility at FIBA-sanctioned events. Players may hold other non-FIBA nationalities not displayed.

Club Ourense Baloncesto roster
Players
Coaches

Pos.	No.	Nat.	Name	Ht.	Age
PG	4	(Spain)	Pérez, Darío		17 – 2 March 2009
SG	7	(Spain)	Oroz, Xabi	1.96 m (6 ft 5 in)	30 – 19 January 1996
SF	8	(Spain)	García, Marc	1.98 m (6 ft 6 in)	30 – 7 March 1996
PG	10	(Nigeria) (United Kingdom)	Russell, Sesan	1.85 m (6 ft 1 in)	27 – 26 April 1999
SG	11	(Spain)	Fernández, Martín	1.94 m (6 ft 4 in)	24 – 5 December 2001
C	12	(Spain)	Nicolau, Javier	2.08 m (6 ft 10 in)	29 – 21 January 1997
PF	13	(Spain)	Pinedo, Eddy	2.02 m (6 ft 8 in)	22 – 7 April 2004
SF	23	(Portugal)	Seixas, Diogo	2.03 m (6 ft 8 in)	22 – 11 March 2004
PF	24	(United States)	McDonnell, Sean	2.08 m (6 ft 10 in)	31 – 13 September 1995
PF/C	25	(Czech Republic)	Zídek, Jan	2.04 m (6 ft 8 in)	26 – 13 December 1999
PF	27	(Spain)	Iglesias, Martín	2.04 m (6 ft 8 in)	22 – 10 January 2004
SF	41	(Spain)	Echave, Fabio		16 – 9 April 2010
CG	44	(Latvia)	Leimanis, Toms	1.90 m (6 ft 3 in)	32 – 7 August 1994

Head coach

- (Spain) Moncho López

Assistant coach(es)

- (Spain) Diego Gómez

Legend

- (C) Team captain
- Injured

=== Depth chart ===
Pos.	Starting 5	Bench 1	Bench 2
C	Javier Nicolau	Jan Zídek
PF	Sean McDonnell	Eddy Pinedo	Martín Iglesias
SF	Marc García	Diogo Seixas	Fabio Echave
SG	Martín Fernández	Sesan Russell
PG	Xabi Oroz	Toms Leimanis	Darío Pérez

Colours: Blue = homegrown player; Red = non-FIBA Europe player

== Season by season ==
Season	Tier	Division	Pos.	W–L	Copa del Rey	Other cups		European competitions		
1979–80	4	3ª División								
1980–81	4	3ª División	6th							
1981–82	4	3ª División	6th							
1982–83	4	3ª División	6th							
1983–84	4	3ª División	1st							
1984–85	3	2ª División	4th							
1985–86	3	2ª División	2nd							
1986–87	2	1ª División B	17th	16–18						
1987–88	2	1ª División B	18th	17–27						
1988–89	2	1ª División B	1st	24–14						
1989–90	1	Liga ACB	21st	16–28	First round					
1990–91	1	Liga ACB	11th	18–22	First round					
1991–92	1	Liga ACB	21st	13–27	First round					
1992–93	1	Liga ACB	8th	17–18	Second round					
1993–94	1	Liga ACB	8th	15–19	Quarterfinalist					
1994–95	1	Liga ACB	15th	17–21	Second round					
1995–96	1	Liga ACB	17th	16–26						
1996–97	1	Liga ACB	16th	13–25						
1997–98	1	Liga ACB	18th	9–29						
1998–99	2	LEB	7th	18–17		Copa Príncipe	QF			
1999–00	2	LEB	2nd	26–13		Copa Príncipe	C			
2000–01	1	Liga ACB	18th	9–25						
2001–02	2	LEB	3rd	28–10		Copa Príncipe	SF			
2002–03	2	LEB	9th	14–16				3 FIBA Champions' Cup	GS	8–8
2003–04	2	LEB	16th	17–22						
2004–05	2	LEB	17th	12–26						
2005–06	3	LEB 2	4th	22–16						
2006–07	3	LEB 2	3rd	25–16		Copa LEB 2	C			
2007–08	3	LEB Plata	14th	12–22						
2008–09	3	LEB Plata	10th (Note: Bought the LEB Oro berth of Cantabria Lobos.)	15–15						
2009–10	2	LEB Oro	15th	13–21						
2010–11	2	LEB Oro	18th	9–25						
2011–12	3	LEB Plata	2nd	25–11						
2012–13	2	LEB Oro	13th (Note: Remained in LEB Oro due to the existence of vacant berths.)	11–20						
2013–14	2	LEB Oro	12th	8–18						
2014–15	2	LEB Oro	2nd (Note: They could not promote in the league because the assembly of the Liga ACB rejected its entry.)	28–10						
2015–16	2	LEB Oro	8th	17–18						
2016–17	2	LEB Oro	9th	19–19						
2017–18	2	LEB Oro	14th	13–21						
2018–19	2	LEB Oro	5th	23–15						
2019–20	2	LEB Oro	10th (Note: Season curtailed due to the COVID-19 pandemic.)	10–14						
2020–21	2	LEB Oro	16th	11–15						
2021–22	3	LEB Plata	3rd	23–9						
2022–23	2	LEB Oro	13th	12–22						
2023–24	2	LEB Oro	11th	14–20						
2024–25	2	Primera FEB	11th	14–20		Spain Cup	GS			
2025–26	2	Primera FEB	12th	12–20		Spain Cup	SF			
2026–27	2	Primera FEB				Spain Cup	R16			

=== Notable players ===
Note: Flags indicate national team eligibility at FIBA-sanctioned events. Players may hold other non-FIBA nationalities not displayed.

Criteria

To appear in this section a player must have either:

- Set a club record or won an individual award while at the club
- Played at least one official international match for their national team at any time
- Played at least one official NBA match at any time.

- (Spain) Santiago Aldama
- (Croatia) Fran Pilepić
- (Cuba) Andrés Guibert
- (Denmark) Zarko Jukic
- (Finland) Roope Ahonen
- (Portugal) Diogo Brito
- (United States) Charles Smith
- (United States) Chaz Williams

== Trophies and awards ==
- 2nd division championships: (1)
  - 1ª División B: (1) 1989
- Copa Príncipe de Asturias: (1)
  - 2000
- Copa LEB Plata: (1)
  - 2007
- Copa Galicia: (7)
  - 1992, 1994, 1995, 1997, 1999, 2001, 2006
