= CB OAR Ferrol =

Former Spanish basketball club

OAR Ferrol
- Founded: 1951
- Dissolved: 1996
- Arena: A Malata
- Capacity: 5,000
- Location: Ferrol, Spain, Galicia
- Championships: 5 Copa Galicia

Club Baloncesto OAR Ferrol was a professional basketball club based in Ferrol, Spain.

== History ==
OAR Ferrol was founded in 1951, but didn't promote to the top league until 1980. During 13 years played on Primera División or Liga ACB and qualified to play the Korać Cup three seasons.

In 1994, the club was relegated due to financial problems and, two years later, it was dissolved.

== Season by season ==
Season	Tier	Division	Pos.	W–L	Copa del Rey	Other cups		European competitions		
1951–78	Lower divisions									
1978–79	2	1ª División B	9th	8–2–12						
1979–80	2	1ª División B	2nd	24–6						
1980–81	1	1ª División	9th	10–1–15	Quarterfinalist					
1981–82	1	1ª División	8th	12–14				3 Korać Cup	R2	3–1
1982–83	1	1ª División	11th	7–2–17	Quarterfinalist			3 Korać Cup	R1	0–1–1
1983–84	1	Liga ACB	7th	12–20						
1984–85	1	Liga ACB	11th	14–15		Copa Príncipe	R4	3 Korać Cup	GS	4–6
1985–86	1	Liga ACB	12th	12–18		Copa Príncipe	SF			
1986–87	1	Liga ACB	16th	5–26		Copa Príncipe	R16			
1987–88	2	1ª División B	1st	37–9						
1988–89	1	Liga ACB	9th	26–13	First round	Copa Príncipe	SF			
1989–90	1	Liga ACB	19th	11–30	First round					
1990–91	1	Liga ACB	21st	16–27	Second round					
1991–92	1	Liga ACB	10th	17–19	First round					
1992–93	1	Liga ACB	15th	13–21	Second round					
1993–94	1	Liga ACB	15th (Note: Resigned to its place in ACB.)	11–19	Quarterfinalist					
1994–95	3	2ª División								

== Notable players ==
- (Spain) Fernando Romay
- (Central African Republic) (Spain) Anicet Lavodrama
- (Denmark) (Canada) Lars Hansen
- (United States) Chuck Aleksinas
- (United States) Linton Townes
- (United States) Otis Howard
- (United States) Jimmy Oliver

== Trophies and awards ==
- Copa Galicia: (5)
  - 1988, 1989, 1990, 1991, 1993
