= 1993–94 ACB season =

Season in Spanish basketball league

- League: Liga ACB
- Sport: Basketball
- Teams: 20
- TV partner: Televisión Española

Regular Season
- Season champions: Real Madrid Teka
- Season MVP: (Lithuania) Arvydas Sabonis (Real Madrid Teka)

Playoffs

ACB Finals
- Champions: Real Madrid Teka
- Runners-up: FC Barcelona Banca Catalana
- Finals MVP: (Lithuania) Arvydas Sabonis (Real Madrid Teka)

ACB seasons
- ← 1992–93 1994–95 →

During the 1993–94 season, the Liga ACB – the top tier of the Spanish basketball league system – contained 20 teams. The winning team was Real Madrid Teka.

== Regular season ==
| Pos | Team | J | G | P | PF | PC | Qualification |
|---|---|---|---|---|---|---|---|
| 1 | Real Madrid Teka | 28 | 24 | 4 | 2473 | 2164 | Championship Playoffs |
| 2 | FC Barcelona Banca Catalana | 28 | 21 | 7 | 2453 | 2314 | Championship Playoffs |
| 3 | TDK Manresa | 28 | 19 | 9 | 2219 | 2207 | Championship Playoffs |
| 4 | 7up Joventut | 28 | 18 | 10 | 2304 | 2071 | Championship Playoffs |
| 5 | Festina Andorra | 28 | 18 | 10 | 2392 | 2223 | Championship Playoffs |
| 6 | Estudiantes Argentaria | 28 | 17 | 11 | 2249 | 2155 | Championship Playoffs |
| 7 | Taugrés Baskonia | 28 | 16 | 12 | 2377 | 2289 | Championship Playoffs |
| 8 | Cáceres CB | 28 | 15 | 13 | 2331 | 2328 | Championship Playoffs |
| 9 | Pamesa Valencia | 28 | 14 | 14 | 2276 | 2337 | Championship Playoffs |
| 10 | Caja San Fernando | 28 | 14 | 14 | 2362 | 2356 | Championship Playoffs |
| 11 | Elmar León | 28 | 13 | 15 | 2360 | 2390 | Championship Playoffs |
| 12 | Unicaja Polti | 28 | 12 | 16 | 2256 | 2285 | Championship Playoffs |
| 13 | Coren Orense | 28 | 12 | 16 | 2119 | 2212 | Championship Playoffs |
| 14 | Natwest Zaragoza | 28 | 11 | 17 | 2283 | 2371 | Championship Playoffs |
| 15 | OAR Ferrol | 28 | 11 | 17 | 2126 | 2134 | Championship Playoffs |
| 16 | DYC Breogán | 28 | 10 | 18 | 2092 | 2238 | Championship Playoffs |
| 17 | Fórum Valladolid | 28 | 9 | 19 | 2395 | 2504 | Relegation playoffs |
| 18 | Argal Huesca | 28 | 9 | 19 | 2327 | 2456 | Relegation playoffs |
| 19 | Valvi Girona | 28 | 9 | 19 | 2204 | 2371 | Relegation playoffs |
| 20 | CB Murcia | 28 | 8 | 20 | 2108 | 2301 | Relegation playoffs |

== Classification playoffs ==
TDK Manresa, Festina Andorra, Taugrés Baskonia and Cáceres CB finished in the previous season between the positions 11th and 20th, so they played a classification game against Unicaja Polti, Elmar León, Caja San Fernando and Pamesa Valencia respectively. After this games, the final classification for the Championship playoffs was modified:

4. Festina Andorra
5. CB Estudiantes
6. Cáceres CB
7. Caja San Fernando
8. Unicaja Polti
9. TDK Manresa
10. Taugrés Baskonia
11. Pamesa Valencia
12. Elmar León

== Relegation playoffs ==
| Finals |
| 17 | Fórum Valladolid | 2 |
| 20 | CB Murcia | 3 |

| Finals |
| 18 | Argal Huesca | 1 |
| 19 | Valvi Girona | 3 |

== Championship Playoffs ==
First round
1 | Real Madrid Teka | 2
16 | DYC Breogán | 0
8 | Unicaja Polti | 0
9 | TDK Manresa | 2
4 | Festina Andorra | 1
13 | Coren Orense | 2
5 | Estudiantes Argentaria | 2
13 | Elmar León | 1
2 | FCB Banca Catalana | 2
15 | OAR Ferrol | 0
7 | Caja San Fernando | 2
10 | Taugrés | 1
3 | 7up Joventut | 2
14 | Natwest Zaragoza | 1
6 | Cáceres CB | 2
11 | Pamesa Valencia | 1

Quarterfinals
1 | Real Madrid Teka | 2
9 | TDK Manresa | 1
5 | Estudiantes Argentaria | 2
13 | Coren Orense | 1
2 | FCB Banca Catalana | 2
10 | Caja San Fernando | 0
3 | 7up Joventut | 2
6 | Cáceres CB | 0

Semifinals
1 | Real Madrid Teka | 3
4 | Estudiantes Argentaria | 1
2 | FCB Banca Catalana | 3
3 | 7up Joventut | 2

Finals
1 | Real Madrid Teka | 3
2 | FCB Banca Catalana | 0

1993–94 ACB League
Real Madrid Teka
5th title
since ACB
