= 1985–86 ACB season =

ACB Primera División
- Season: 1985–86
- Games played: 257
- Teams: 16

Regular season
- Relegated: Cajamadrid; Claret Las Palmas; Licor 43

Finals
- Champions: Real Madrid; 3rd ACB title 25th Spanish title
- Runners-up: FC Barcelona
- Semifinalists: Ron Negrita Joventut; CAI Zaragoza

The 1985–86 ACB season was the 3rd season of the ACB Primera División, the top Spanish professional basketball league. It started on 21 September 1985 with the first round of the regular season and ended on 10 May 1986 with the finals.

Real Madrid won their third consecutive ACB title, and their 25th Spanish title.

== Teams ==
=== Promotion and relegation (pre-season) ===
A total of 16 teams contested the league, including 13 sides from the 1984–85 season and three promoted from the 1984–85 Primera División B.

Teams promoted from Primera División B

- Magia de Huesca
- Claret Las Palmas
- TDK Manresa

=== Venues and locations ===
Location of teams in 1985–86 ACB
Location of teams from Barcelona in 1985–86 ACB
Location of teams from the Canary Islands in 1985–86 ACB

Team	Home city	Arena
Breogán Caixa Galicia	Lugo	Municipal
Cacaolat Granollers	Granollers	Municipal
CAI Zaragoza	Zaragoza	Palacio de Deportes
Caja Álava	Vitoria-Gasteiz	Mendizorrotza
Cajamadrid	Alcalá de Henares	Municipal
Claret Las Palmas	Las Palmas	Tarnaraceite
Clesa Ferrol	Ferrol	Punta Arnela
Espanyol Juver	Barcelona	Palau dels Esports
Estudiantes Caja Postal	Madrid	Antonio Magariños
FC Barcelona	Barcelona	Palau Blaugrana
Fórum Valladolid	Valladolid	Huerta del Rey
Licor 43	Santa Coloma de Gramenet	Municipal
Magia de Huesca	Huesca	Municipal
Real Madrid	Madrid	Ciudad Deportiva
Ron Negrita Joventut	Badalona	Club Joventut Badalona
TDK Manresa	Manresa	Congost

== First phase ==
=== Group Odd ===
Pos	Team	Pld	W	L	PF	PA	PD	Pts	Qualification
1	Real Madrid	14	12	2	1383	1097	+286	26	Qualification to Group A1
2	FC Barcelona	14	12	2	1429	1178	+251	26	Qualification to Group A1
3	Cacaolat Granollers	14	8	6	1242	1224	+18	22	Qualification to Group A1
4	Estudiantes Caja Postal	14	7	7	1246	1300	−54	21	Qualification to Group A1
5	Cajamadrid	14	6	8	1107	1244	−137	20	Qualification to Group A2
6	Clesa Ferrol	14	5	9	1177	1323	−146	19	Qualification to Group A2
7	Fórum Valladolid	14	3	11	1159	1232	−73	17	Qualification to Group A2
8	Magia de Huesca	14	3	11	1128	1273	−145	17	Qualification to Group A2

Source: Linguasport

=== Group Even ===
Pos	Team	Pld	W	L	PF	PA	PD	Pts	Qualification
1	Ron Negrita Joventut	14	13	1	1355	1167	+188	27	Qualification to Group A1
2	CAI Zaragoza	14	11	3	1293	1216	+77	25	Qualification to Group A1
3	Espanyol Juver	14	9	5	1219	1227	−8	23	Qualification to Group A1
4	Breogán Caixa Galicia	14	7	7	1238	1272	−34	21	Qualification to Group A1
5	Caja Álava	14	6	8	1216	1256	−40	20	Qualification to Group A2
6	Licor 43	14	5	9	1226	1246	−20	19	Qualification to Group A2
7	TDK Manresa	14	4	10	1154	1213	−59	18	Qualification to Group A2
8	Claret Las Palmas	14	1	13	1067	1171	−104	15	Qualification to Group A2

Source: Linguasport

== Second phase ==
=== Group A1 ===
Pos	Team	Pld	W	L	PF	PA	PD	Pts	Qualification
1	Real Madrid	14	12	2	1392	1174	+218	26	Qualification to quarterfinals
2	FC Barcelona	14	11	3	1394	1201	+193	25	Qualification to quarterfinals
3	Ron Negrita Joventut	14	9	5	1314	1275	+39	23	Qualification to quarterfinals
4	CAI Zaragoza	14	8	6	1322	1325	−3	22	Qualification to quarterfinals
5	Estudiantes Caja Postal	14	8	6	1331	1308	+23	22	Qualification to first round
6	Espanyol Juver	14	5	9	1190	1330	−140	19	Qualification to first round
7	Breogán Caixa Galicia	14	2	12	1193	1395	−202	16	Qualification to first round
8	Cacaolat Granollers	14	1	13	1169	1297	−128	15	Qualification to first round

Source: Linguasport

=== Group A2 ===
Pos	Team	Pld	W	L	PF	PA	PD	Pts	Qualification
1	Caja Álava	14	10	4	1179	1120	+59	24	Qualification to first round
2	TDK Manresa	14	10	4	1207	1117	+90	24	Qualification to first round
3	Fórum Valladolid	14	8	6	1138	1092	+46	22	Qualification to first round
4	Clesa Ferrol	14	7	7	1132	1100	+32	21	Qualification to first round
5	Magia de Huesca	14	6	8	1166	1207	−41	20	Qualification to relegation playoffs
6	Claret Las Palmas	14	6	8	1099	1232	−133	20	Qualification to relegation playoffs
7	Cajamadrid	14	5	9	1193	1235	−42	19	Qualification to relegation playoffs
8	Licor 43	14	4	10	1156	1167	−11	18	Qualification to relegation playoffs

Source: Linguasport

== Playoffs ==
=== Championship playoffs ===
First round
A1–8 Cacaolat Granollers	93	96
A2–1 Caja Álava	90	84
A1–5 Estudiantes	102	88
A2–4 Clesa Ferrol	84	86
A1–7 Breogán Caixa Galicia	105	95
A2–2 TDK Manresa	91	86
A1–6 Espanyol Juver	82	85	87
A2–3 Fórum Valladolid	88	84	86

Quarterfinals
A1–1 Real Madrid	97	87
A1–8 Cacaolat Granollers	84	76
A1–4 CAI Zaragoza	105	89
A1–5 Estudiantes	99	88
A1–2 FC Barcelona	123	137
A1–7 Breogán Caixa Galicia	82	82
A1–3 Joventut	97	88
A1–6 Espanyol Juver	85	73

Semifinals
A1–1 Real Madrid	98	105
A1–4 CAI Zaragoza	81	93
A1–2 FC Barcelona	96	96	95
A1–3 Joventut	95	100	81

Finals
A1–1 Real Madrid	83	88
A1–2 FC Barcelona	80	86

Source: Linguasport

=== Relegation playoffs ===
First round
A2–5 Magia de Huesca	111	95	82
A2–8 Licor 43	105	108	79
A2–6 Claret Las Palmas	95	72	95
A2–7 Cajamadrid	85	98	99

Second round
A2–5 Magia de Huesca	107	92	83
A2–7 Cajamadrid	90	97	72

Source: Linguasport

== Final standings ==
Pos	Team	Pld	W	L	Qualification or relegation
1	Real Madrid (C)	34	30	4	Qualification to European Champions Cup
2	FC Barcelona	35	27	8	Qualification to Korać Cup
3	Ron Negrita Joventut	33	25	8	Qualification to European Cup Winners' Cup
4	CAI Zaragoza	32	21	11	Qualification to Korać Cup
5	Estudiantes Caja Postal	32	17	15	Qualification to Korać Cup
6	Espanyol Juver	33	16	17	Qualification to Korać Cup
7	Breogán Caixa Galicia	32	11	21	
8	Cacaolat Granollers	32	11	21	
9	Caja Álava	30	16	14	
10	TDK Manresa	30	14	16	
11	Fórum Valladolid	31	12	19	
12	Clesa Ferrol	30	12	18	
13	Magia de Huesca	34	13	21	
14	Cajamadrid (R)	34	14	20	Relegation to Primera División B
15	Claret Las Palmas (R)	31	8	23	Relegation to Primera División B
16	Licor 43 (R)	31	10	21	Relegation to Primera División B

Source: Linguasport
(C) Champions; (R) Relegated
