= 2023 ACB Playoffs =

Spanish basketball postseason tournament

Tournament details
- Country: Spain
- Dates: 27 May–20 June 2023
- Teams: 8
- Defending champions: Real Madrid

Final positions
- Champions: Barça; 17th ACB title 20th Spanish title
- Runner-up: Real Madrid
- Semifinalists: Unicaja; Joventut

Tournament statistics
- Matches played: 19
- Attendance: 156,999 (8,263 per match)

The 2023 ACB Playoffs, also known as 2023 Liga Endesa Playoffs for sponsorship reasons, was the postseason tournament of the ACB's 2022–23 season, which began on 28 September 2022. The playoffs started on May 27 after the EuroLeague Final Four, which was played on May 19–21, and ended on June 20.

Real Madrid was the defending champion, but was swept in the final series by Barça, who won their 20th title (17th in the ACB era), returning to glory since their last triumph in 2021.

== Format ==
At the end of the regular season, the eight teams with the most wins qualify for the playoffs. The seedings are based on each team's record.

The bracket is fixed; there is no reseeding. The quarterfinals are best-of-three series; the team that wins two games advances to the next round. This round is in a 1–1–1 format. From the semifinals onward, the rounds are best-of-five series; the team that wins three games advances to the next round. These rounds, including the Finals, are in a 2–2–1 format. Home court advantage in any round belong to the higher-seeded team.

== Playoff qualifying ==
On April 2, 2023, Barça became the first team to clinch a playoff spot.

Seed	Team	Record	Clinched		
Seed	Team	Record	Playoff berth	Seeded team	Top seed
1	Barça	29–5	April 2	April 30	May 14
2	Cazoo Baskonia	28–6	April 9	April 30	–
3	Real Madrid	28–6	April 9	May 7	–
4	Lenovo Tenerife	24–10	April 23	May 23	–
5	Unicaja	24–10	April 20	–	–
6	Dreamland Gran Canaria	19–15	April 30	–	–
7	Joventut	19–15	April 26	–	–
8	Valencia Basket	17–17	May 24	–	–

== Bracket ==
Teams in bold advanced to the next round. The numbers to the left of each team indicate the team's seeding, the numbers to the right indicate the result of games including result in bold of the team that won in that game, and the numbers furthest to the right indicate the number of games the team won in that round.

Quarterfinals
**1**	**Barça**	**84**	**87**	**2**
8	Valencia Basket	74	64	0
4	Lenovo Tenerife	59	74	0
**5**	**Unicaja**	**72**	**97**	**2**
**3**	**Real Madrid**	**95**	**89**	**2**
6	Dreamland Gran Canaria	68	81	0
2	Cazoo Baskonia	91	76	0
**7**	**Joventut**	**99**	**83**	**2**

Semifinals
**1**	**Barça**	**84**	79	**90**	**87**	**3**
5	Unicaja	81	**88**	79	75	1
**3**	**Real Madrid**	83	**90**	**83**	**94**	**3**
7	Joventut	**93**	73	73	73	1

Finals
**1**	**Barça**	**97**	**86**	**93**	**3**
3	Real Madrid	88	85	82	0

== Quarterfinals ==
All times are in Central European Summer Time (UTC+02:00)

=== Barça v Valencia Basket ===
29 May 2023	**Barça**	**84**–74 (Series: **1–0**)	Valencia Basket	Barcelona
21:00	Scoring by quarter: **18**–16, **22**–21, **29**–18, 15–**19**
	Pts: Mirotić 27; Rebs: Veselý 6 Asts: Satoranský 6 PIR: Mirotić 31	Boxscore	Pts: Harper 15; Rebs: Dubljević 7 Asts: Jones 5 PIR: Jones 16	Arena: Palau Blaugrana; Attendance: 5,454; Referees: Miguel Ángel Pérez Pérez, Rafael Serrano, Esperanza Mendoza

2 June 2023	Valencia Basket	64–**87** (Series: **0–2**)	**Barça**	Valencia
21:00	Scoring by quarter: 13–**26**, 13–**17**, 19–**24**, 19–**20**
	Pts: Harper 12; Rebs: Dubljević 8 Asts: Jones 3 PIR: Dubljević 17	Boxscore	Pts: Satoranský 14; Rebs: Tobey 8 Asts: Satoranský 7 PIR: Satoranský 20	Arena: La Fonteta; Attendance: 7,103; Referees: Juan Carlos García González, Benjamín Jiménez, Alfonso Olivares

Regular season series
Barça won 2–0 in the regular season series

30 October 2022

Boxscore

Valencia Basket	80–**92**	**Barça**

La Fonteta, Valencia

5 February 2023

Boxscore

**Barça**	**81**–75	Valencia Basket

Palau Blaugrana, Barcelona

This was the sixth playoff meeting between these two teams, with Barça winning four of the first five meetings.

Previous playoff series
Barça leads 4–1 in all-time playoff series

2003

**FC Barcelona**	**3**–0	Pamesa Valencia

2003 Finals

2009

**Regal FC Barcelona**	**2**–0	Pamesa Valencia

2009 Quarterfinals

2012

**FC Barcelona Regal**	**3**–1	Valencia Basket

2012 Semifinals

2014

Valencia Basket	2–**3**	**FC Barcelona**

2014 Semifinals

2017

**Valencia Basket**	**2**–1	FC Barcelona Lassa

2017 Quarterfinals

=== Cazoo Baskonia v Joventut ===
27 May 2023	Cazoo Baskonia	91–**99** (Series: **0–1**)	**Joventut**	Vitoria-Gasteiz
18:30	Scoring by quarter: 16–**28**, **23**–20, 27–**30**, **25**–21
	Pts: Howard 28; Rebs: Giedraitis 8 Asts: Thompson 7 PIR: Sedekerskis 21	Boxscore	Pts: Guy 36; Rebs: three players 5 Asts: Feliz 6 PIR: Guy 34	Arena: Buesa Arena; Attendance: 8,648; Referees: Antonio Conde, Martín Caballero, Francisco Araña

30 May 2023	**Joventut**	**83**–76 (Series: **2–0**)	Cazoo Baskonia	Badalona
21:00	Scoring by quarter: **21**–19, **25**–21, **25**–22, 12–**14**
	Pts: Guy 22; Rebs: Parra 10; Asts: Tomić 4 PIR: Brodziansky 19	Boxscore	Pts: Howard 16; Rebs: Kotsar 8 Asts: Thompson 6 PIR: Kotsar 25	Arena: Palau Municipal d'Esports; Attendance: 6,917; Referees: Daniel Hierrezuelo, Jordi Aliaga, Sergio Manuel

Regular season series
Baskonia won 2–0 in the regular season series

15 January 2023

Boxscore

**Cazoo Baskonia**	**84**–83	Joventut

Buesa Arena, Vitoria-Gasteiz

11 May 2023

Boxscore

Joventut	77–**86**	**Cazoo Baskonia**

Palau Municipal d'Esports, Badalona

This was the fourth playoff meeting between these two teams, with Joventut winning two of the first three meetings.

Previous playoff series
Joventut leads 2–1 in all-time playoff series

1991

**Montigalá Joventut**	**3**–1	Taugrés

1991 Semifinals

1997

**Festina Joventut**	**3**–1	Taugrés

1997 Quarterfinals

2004

**TAU Cerámica**	**3**–0	DKV Joventut

2004 Quarterfinals

=== Real Madrid v Dreamland Gran Canaria ===
28 May 2023	**Real Madrid**	**95**–68 (Series: **1–0**)	Dreamland Gran Canaria	Madrid
12:30	Scoring by quarter: **22**–13, **29**–12, 19–**22**, **25**–21
	Pts: Musa 20; Rebs: Tavares 8 Asts: three players 3 PIR: Musa 21	Boxscore	Pts: Balcerowski, Inglis 15; Rebs: Balcerowski, Inglis 5 Asts: Brussino 5 PIR: Inglis 18	Arena: WiZink Center; Attendance: 7,558; Referees: Fernando Calatrava, Jorge Martínez, Joaquín García

31 May 2023	Dreamland Gran Canaria	81–**89** (Series: **0–2**)	**Real Madrid**	Las Palmas
21:00	Scoring by quarter: 18–**21**, **19**–18, 19–**28**, **25**–22
	Pts: Slaughter 17; Rebs: Inglis 8 Asts: Albicy 4 PIR: Balcerowski 15	Boxscore	Pts: Musa 22; Rebs: Tavares 12; Asts: Rodríguez 4 PIR: Musa 24	Arena: Gran Canaria Arena; Attendance: 6,287; Referees: Carlos Peruga, Carlos Cortés, Juan de Dios Oyón

Regular season series
Madrid won 2–0 in the regular season series

8 January 2023

Boxscore

**Real Madrid**	**105**–85	Gran Canaria

WiZink Center, Madrid

14 May 2023

Boxscore

Gran Canaria	67–**95**	**Real Madrid**

Gran Canaria Arena, Las Palmas

This was the fifth playoff meeting between these two teams, with Real Madrid winning the previous four meetings.

Previous playoff series
Madrid leads 4–0 in all-time playoff series

2000

**Real Madrid Teka**	**3**–0	Canarias Telecom

2000 Quarterfinals

2015

**Real Madrid**	**2**–0	Herbalife Gran Canaria

2015 Quarterfinals

2018

**Real Madrid**	**3**–0	Herbalife Gran Canaria

2018 Semifinals

2021

**Real Madrid**	**2**–0	Herbalife Gran Canaria

2021 Quarterfinals

=== Lenovo Tenerife v Unicaja ===
28 May 2023	Lenovo Tenerife	59–**72** (Series: **0–1**)	**Unicaja**	San Cristóbal de La Laguna
21:00	Scoring by quarter: 9–**13**, 11–**19**, 16–**22**, **23**–18
	Pts: Fitipaldo 13; Rebs: Diagne 6 Asts: Bolmaro 4 PIR: Fitipaldo 14	Boxscore	Pts: Perry 16; Rebs: Kravish 7 Asts: Brizuela 4 PIR: Osetkowski 16	Arena: Santiago Martín; Attendance: 5,047; Referees: Carlos Peruga, Óscar Perea, Raúl Zamorano

1 June 2023	**Unicaja**	**97**–74 (Series: **2–0**)	Lenovo Tenerife	Málaga
21:00	Scoring by quarter: 13–**22**, **37**–14, **26**–21, **21**–17
	Pts: Kalinoski 21; Rebs: Osetkowski 7 Asts: Carter 6 PIR: Perry 20	Boxscore	Pts: Doornekamp, Salin 13; Rebs: Diagné 7 Asts: Guerra, Huertas 4 PIR: Huertas 18	Arena: Martín Carpena; Attendance: 10,602; Referees: Emilio Pérez Pizarro, Luis Miguel Castillo, Cristóbal Sánchez

Regular season series
Tied 1–1 in the regular season series

8 January 2023

Boxscore

**Lenovo Tenerife**	**91**–84	Unicaja

Santiago Martín, San Cristóbal de La Laguna

21 May 2023

Boxscore

**Unicaja**	**75**–71	Lenovo Tenerife

Martín Carpena, Málaga

This was the second playoff meeting between these two teams, with Unicaja winning the first one.

Previous playoff series
Unicaja leads 1–0 in all-time playoff series

2017

**Unicaja**	**2**–1	Iberostar Tenerife

2017 Quarterfinals

== Semifinals ==
All times are in Central European Summer Time (UTC+02:00)

=== Barça v Unicaja ===
7 June 2023	**Barça**	**84**–81 (Series: **1–0**)	Unicaja	Barcelona
21:00	Scoring by quarter: **26**–15, **19**–16, 21–**27**, 18–**23**
	Pts: Mirotić 14; Rebs: three players 4 Asts: Satoranský 5 PIR: Jokubaitis 16	Boxscore	Pts: Sima 19; Rebs: Ejim 8 Asts: Carter 6 PIR: Sima 24	Arena: Palau Blaugrana; Attendance: 5,390; Referees: Fernando Calatrava, Jordi Aliaga, Francisco Araña

9 June 2023	Barça	79–**88** (Series: **1–1**)	**Unicaja**	Barcelona
21:00	Scoring by quarter: 18–**25**, **19**–15, 20–**23**, 22–**25**
	Pts: Laprovíttola 19; Rebs: Veselý 5 Asts: Satoranský 5 PIR: Kalinić 20	Boxscore	Pts: Carter 19; Rebs: Ejim 9 Asts: Perry 5 PIR: Kravish 20	Arena: Palau Blaugrana; Attendance: 6,153; Referees: Carlos Peruga, Vicente Bultó, Rafael Serrano

11 June 2023	Unicaja	79–**90** (Series: **1–2**)	**Barça**	Málaga
18:30	Scoring by quarter: 17–**20**, **26**–20, 17–**26**, 19–**24**
	Pts: Kravish 13; Rebs: Sima 6 Asts: Díaz 4 PIR: Kravish 14	Boxscore	Pts: four players 12; Rebs: Mirotić 5 Asts: Jokubaitis 5 PIR: Mirotić 17	Arena: Martín Carpena; Attendance: 10,602; Referees: Antonio Conde, Martín Caballero, Javier Torres

13 June 2023	Unicaja	75–**87** (Series: **1–3**)	**Barça**	Málaga
21:00	Scoring by quarter: 13–**23**, **24**–22, 15–**28**, **23**–14
	Pts: Kravish 10; Rebs: Ejim 5 Asts: Brizuela 3 PIR: Kravish 10	Boxscore	Pts: Mirotić 13; Rebs: Veselý 7 Asts: Jokubaitis 6 PIR: Mirotić 14	Arena: Martín Carpena; Attendance: 10,602; Referees: Juan Carlos García González, Carlos Cortés, Sergio Manuel

Regular season series
Barça won 2–0 in the regular season series

18 December 2022

Boxscore

**Barça**	**75**–60	Unicaja

Palau Blaugrana, Barcelona

19 March 2023

Boxscore

Unicaja	81–**86**	**Barça**

Martín Carpena, Málaga

This will be the 10th playoff meeting between these two teams, with Barça winning the previous nine meetings.

Previous playoff series
Barça leads 9–0 in all-time playoff series

1995

**FC Barcelona Banca Catalana**	**3**–2	Unicaja

1995 Finals

1997

**FC Barcelona Banca Catalana**	**3**–2	Unicaja

1997 Quarterfinals

2000

**FC Barcelona**	**3**–2	Unicaja

2000 Quarterfinals

2001

**FC Barcelona**	**3**–0	Unicaja

2001 Semifinals

2004

**FC Barcelona**	**3**–0	Unicaja

2004 Semifinals

2009

**Regal FC Barcelona**	**2**–1	Unicaja

2009 Semifinals

2010

**Regal FC Barcelona**	**3**–0	Unicaja

2010 Semifinals

2011

**Regal FC Barcelona**	**2**–0	Unicaja

2011 Quarterfinals

2015

**FC Barcelona Lassa**	**3**–2	Unicaja

2015 Semifinals

=== Real Madrid v Joventut ===
6 June 2023	Real Madrid	83–**93** (Series: **0–1**)	**Joventut**	Madrid
21:00	Scoring by quarter: **22**–18, 17–**24**, 25–25, 19–**26**
	Pts: Musa, Tavares 18; Rebs: Tavares 14; Asts: Rodríguez 4 PIR: Tavares 38	Boxscore	Pts: Guy 30; Rebs: Tomić 11; Asts: Vives 6 PIR: Guy, Tomić 26	Arena: WiZink Center; Attendance: 8,672; Referees: Antonio Conde, Emilio Pérez Pizarro, Vicente Martínez

8 June 2023	**Real Madrid**	**90**–73 (Series: **1–1**)	Joventut	Madrid
21:00	Scoring by quarter: **22**–14, 14–**26**, **27**–19, **27**–14
	Pts: Yabusele 27; Rebs: Tavares 10; Asts: Rodríguez, Williams-Goss 4 PIR: Yabusele 37	Boxscore	Pts: Ellenson 17; Rebs: Parra 7 Asts: Feliz 4 PIR: Feliz 19	Arena: WiZink Center; Attendance: 9,468; Referees: Daniel Hierrezuelo, Benjamín Jiménez, Andrés Fernández

10 June 2023	Joventut	73–**83** (Series: **1–2**)	**Real Madrid**	Badalona
18:30	Scoring by quarter: 16–**25**, 16–**23**, 11–**22**, **30**–13
	Pts: Guy 20; Rebs: Tomić 6 Asts: Feliz 5 PIR: Guy 19	Boxscore	Pts: Musa 25; Rebs: Tavares 8 Asts: Williams-Goss 5 PIR: Musa 29	Arena: Palau Municipal d'Esports; Attendance: 12,323; Referees: Carlos Peruga, Óscar Perea, Fabio Fernández

12 June 2023	Joventut	73–**94** (Series: **1–3**)	**Real Madrid**	Badalona
21:00	Scoring by quarter: 17–17, 18–**21**, 14–**25**, 24–**31**
	Pts: Parra 17; Rebs: Birgander 7 Asts: Feliz, Vives 4 PIR: Parra 20	Boxscore	Pts: Hezonja, Musa 16; Rebs: Tavares 10; Asts: Rodríguez 7 PIR: Tavares 28	Arena: Palau Municipal d'Esports; Attendance: 9,924; Referees: Emilio Pérez Pizarro, Fernando Calatrava, Alfonso Olivares

Regular season series
Madrid won 2–0 in the regular season series

16 October 2022

Boxscore

**Real Madrid**	**96**–79	Joventut

WiZink Center, Madrid

23 April 2023

Boxscore

Joventut	76–**86**	**Real Madrid**

Palau Municipal d'Esports, Badalona

This was the 11th playoff meeting between these two teams, with Real Madrid winning eight of the previous ten meetings.

Previous playoff series
Madrid leads 8–2 in all-time playoff series

1984

**Real Madrid**	**2**–0	Joventut Massana

1984 Semifinals

1985

**Real Madrid**	**2**–1	Ron Negrita Joventut

1985 Finals

1989

**Real Madrid**	**3**–1	Ram Joventut

1989 Semifinals

1990

Real Madrid	0–**3**	**Ram Joventut**

1990 Semifinals

1992

**Montigalà Joventut**	**3**–2	Real Madrid

1992 Finals

1993

**Real Madrid Teka**	**3**–2	Marbella Joventut

1993 Finals

1997

**Real Madrid Teka**	**3**–0	Festina Joventut

1997 Semifinals

2005

**Real Madrid**	**3**–1	DKV Joventut

2005 Quarterfinals

2007

**Real Madrid**	**3**–2	DKV Joventut

2007 Semifinals

2009

**Real Madrid**	**2**–1	DKV Joventut

2009 Quarterfinals

== Finals ==
All times are in Central European Summer Time (UTC+02:00)

16 June 2023	**Barça**	**97**–88 (Series: **1–0**)	Real Madrid	Barcelona
21:00	Scoring by quarter: **28**–23, 19–**27**, **16**–11, **34**–27
	Pts: Laprovíttola 19; Rebs: Mirotić 7 Asts: Jokubaitis 7 PIR: Laprovíttola 23	Boxscore	Pts: Rodríguez 16; Rebs: Tavares 7 Asts: Rodríguez 3 PIR: Tavares 22	Arena: Palau Blaugrana; Attendance: 6,819; Referees: Daniel Hierrezuelo, Óscar Perea, Martín Caballero

18 June 2023	**Barça**	**86**–85 (Series: **2–0**)	Real Madrid	Barcelona
18:30	Scoring by quarter: **20**–19, **25**–22, 23–**24**, 18–**20**
	Pts: Mirotić 20; Rebs: Satoranský 5 Asts: Laprovíttola 4 PIR: Mirotić 26	Boxscore	Pts: Hezonja 18; Rebs: Tavares 6 Asts: Musa 3 PIR: Hezonja 22	Arena: Palau Blaugrana; Attendance: 7,406; Referees: Antonio Conde, Emilio Pérez Pizarro, Fernando Calatrava

20 June 2023	Real Madrid	82–**93** (Series: **0–3**)	**Barça**	Madrid
21:00	Scoring by quarter: **21**–20, **20**–18, 25–**29**, 16–**26**
	Pts: Tavares 19; Rebs: Tavares 11; Asts: Rodríguez 6 PIR: Tavares 28	Boxscore	Pts: Veselý 19; Rebs: Mirotić 6 Asts: Laprovíttola 5 PIR: Mirotić 18	Arena: WiZink Center; Attendance: 11,965; Referees: Carlos Peruga, Benjamín Jiménez, Javier Torres

Regular season series
Barça won 2–0 in the regular season series

2 January 2023

Boxscore

Real Madrid	78–**87**	**Barça**

WiZink Center, Madrid

16 April 2023

Boxscore

**Barça**	**97**–82	Real Madrid

Palau Blaugrana, Barcelona

This was the 22nd playoff meeting between these two teams, with Real Madrid winning 11 out of the first 21 meetings.

Previous playoff series
Madrid leads 11–10 in all-time playoff series

1984

**Real Madrid**	**2**–1	FC Barcelona

1984 Finals

1986

**Real Madrid**	**2**–0	FC Barcelona

1986 Finals

1987

**FC Barcelona**	**3**–1	Real Madrid

1987 Semifinals

1988

**FC Barcelona**	**3**–2	Real Madrid

1988 Finals

1989

**FC Barcelona**	**3**–2	Real Madrid

1989 Finals

1992

**Real Madrid Asegurator**	**2**–0	FC Barcelona

1992 Quarterfinals

1994

**Real Madrid Teka**	**3**–0	FC Barcelona Banca Catalana

1994 Finals

1995

**FC Barcelona Banca Catalana**	**3**–2	Real Madrid Teka

1995 Semifinals

1997

Real Madrid Teka	2–**3**	**FC Barcelona Banca Catalana**

1997 Finals

2000

FC Barcelona	2–**3**	**Real Madrid Teka**

2000 Finals

2001

**FC Barcelona**	**3**–0	Real Madrid

2001 Finals

2006

**Winterthur FC Barcelona**	**3**–1	Real Madrid

2006 Quarterfinals

2007

**Real Madrid**	**3**–1	Winterthur FC Barcelona

2007 Finals

2012

**FC Barcelona Regal**	**3**–2	Real Madrid

2012 Finals

2013

**Real Madrid**	**3**–2	FC Barcelona Regal

2013 Finals

2014

Real Madrid	1–**3**	**FC Barcelona**

2014 Finals

2015

**Real Madrid**	**3**–0	FC Barcelona

2015 Finals

2016

FC Barcelona Lassa	1–**3**	**Real Madrid**

2016 Finals

2019

**Real Madrid**	**3**–1	Barça Lassa

2019 Finals

2021

Real Madrid	0–**2**	**Barça**

2021 Finals

2022

Barça	1–**3**	**Real Madrid**

2022 Finals
