= Aíto García Reneses =

Spanish basketball player and coach

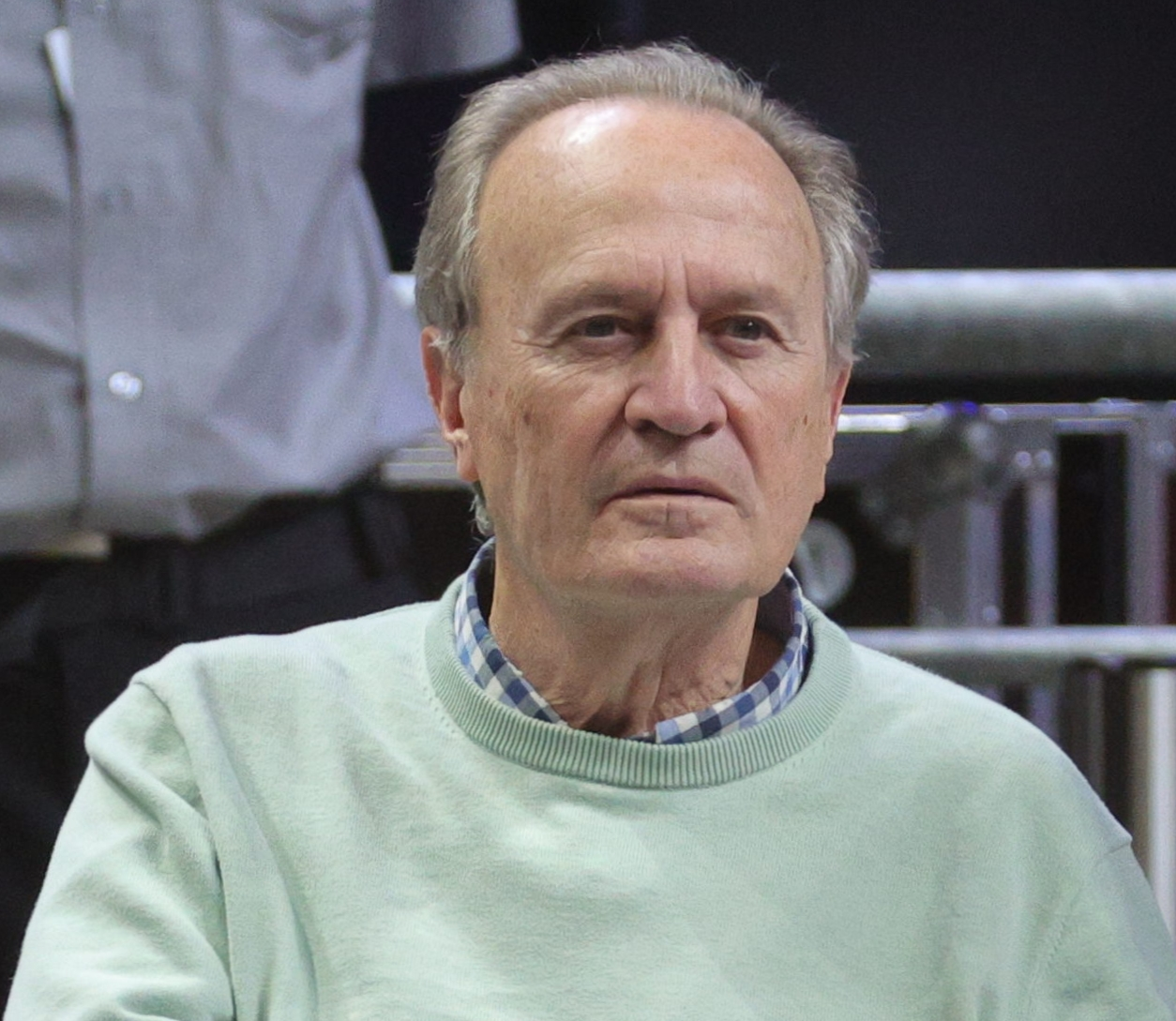
- Aíto in 2024

Personal information
- Born: 20 December 1946 (age 79) Madrid, Spain
- Listed height: 6 ft 1.25 in (1.86 m)
- Listed weight: 180 lb (82 kg)

Career information
- Playing career: 1963–1973
- Position: Point guard
- Coaching career: 1998–present

Career history

Playing
- 1963–1968: Estudiantes
- 1968–1973: FC Barcelona

Coaching
- 1973–1983: Círculo Católico / Cotonificio
- 1983–1985: Joventut Badalona
- 1985–1990: FC Barcelona
- 1992–1997: FC Barcelona
- 1998–2001: FC Barcelona
- 2003–2008: Joventut Badalona
- 2008: Spain
- 2008–2011: Unicaja
- 2012–2014: Sevilla
- 2014–2016: Gran Canaria
- 2017–2021: Alba Berlin
- 2022–2023: Bàsquet Girona

Career highlights
- As head coach: FIBA European Super Cup champion (1986); EuroCup champion (2008); FIBA Saporta Cup champion (1986); 2× FIBA Korać Cup champion (1987, 1999); FIBA EuroChallenge champion (2006); 9× Liga ACB champion (1987–1990, 1995–1997, 1999, 2001); 5× Spanish Cup winner (1987, 1988, 1994, 2001, 2008); Spanish Super Cup winner (1987); Prince of Asturias Cup winner (1988); Catalan League champion (2005); 2× Bundesliga champion (2020, 2021); German Cup winner (2020); FIBA European Selection Head coach (1990); 2× EuroCup Coach of the Year (2015, 2019); ULEB All-Star Game (1994); 4× AEEB Spanish Coach of the Year (1976, 1990, 2006, 2008); 3× Spanish All-Star Game (1986, 1988, 2001 (II)); Bundesliga Coach of the Year (2018)
Medals
Men's basketball
Head coach for Spain
Summer Olympics
Silver medal – second place	2008 Beijing
European U16 Championship
Bronze medal – third place	1979 Syria	Under-16 Team

Alejandro "Aíto" García Reneses (born 20 December 1946 in Madrid, Spain), usually and most commonly known as just "Aíto", is a Spanish former professional basketball player and coach. As a head coach at the professional club level, García Reneses won the FIBA European Super Cup championship in 1986. He was also a Finalist of Europe's top-tier level pro club competition, the EuroLeague, on three occasions with Spanish club FC Barcelona: in the 1989–90, 1995–96, and 1996–97 seasons. He also coached Barcelona in six EuroLeague Final Fours. García Reneses also won five European-wide professional club championships. He won two European-wide 2nd-tier level championships, as he won the FIBA Saporta Cup championship with FC Barcelona, in the 1985–86 season; and the EuroCup championship with the Spanish club Joventut Badalona, in the 2007–08 season. He also won three European-wide 3rd-tier level championships, as he won the FIBA Korać Cup championship with Joventut Badalona, in the 1986–87 season, the FIBA Korać Cup championship with Barcelona, in the 1998–99 season, and the FIBA EuroChallenge championship with Joventut Badalona, in the 2005–06 season.

García Reneses was the first head coach to win the European-wide 2nd-tier level EuroCup's Coach of the Year award twice, as he won the award with Gran Canaria in 2015, and also with Alba Berlin in 2019. During his club head coaching career, García Reneses trained and developed several young players that would eventually go on to play in the NBA, such as: Pau Gasol, Juan Carlos Navarro, Rudy Fernández, Ricky Rubio, and Kristaps Porziņģis.

García Reneses was also the head coach of the senior Spanish national team. He led Spain's national team to the silver medal at the 2008 Summer Olympics.

== Playing career ==
During his club playing career, García Reneses played at the point guard position. He played in the Spanish First Division, with Estudiantes Madrid, from 1963 to 1968, and with FC Barcelona, from 1968 to 1973. While with Barcelona, he was the team's captain.

== Club coaching career ==
=== Spain ===
García Reneses spent most of his basketball coaching career in Barcelona, Cataluña, Spain, with FC Barcelona. Altogether, he spent a total of 15 seasons with FC Barcelona, working as the club's head coach for 13 seasons, and also as the club's general manager, for two seasons. García Reneses also coached two basketball teams from Badalona, Cataluña, Spain: Círcol Catòlic (also called "Cotonificio" or "Coto"), and Joventut, where he worked from 1983–1985 and also from 2003–2008. In Spain, he also coached Baloncesto Unicaja Málaga for three seasons (2008–2011), led CDB Sevilla between 2012 and 2014, trained Gran Canaria, from 2014 to 2016, and coached Girona, during the 2022–23 season.

As FC Barcelona's head coach, García Reneses won nine Spanish national domestic Liga ACB championships. He won the Spanish League championship with Barcelona in the seasons: 1986–87, 1987–88, 1988–89, 1989–90, 1994–95, 1995–96, 1996–97, 1998–99, and 2000–01. He also won five national domestic Spanish King's Cup titles. He won four Spanish Cup titles with Barcelona in the years 1987, 1988, 1994, and 2001, and a fifth Spanish Cup title with Joventut Badalona, in 2008. In addition to that, he won the Spanish Super Cup title with Barcelona, in 1987.

On an individual level, García Reneses was a four-time AEEB Spanish Coach of the Year, in the years 1976, 1990, 2006, and 2008.

=== Germany ===
In the Summer of 2017, at the age of 70, García Reneses moved to a non-Spanish club, for the first time in his life: He became the head coach of the German Bundesliga club Alba Berlin. In his first season in Berlin, he was awarded the German Federal League's Bundesliga Coach of the Year award, and he also had a big influence on the German club's youth basketball development. Under García Reneses, several talented Alba youth players, such as Tim Schneider and Bennet Hundt, made the leap up from the German junior ranks, to the senior men's Bundesliga team. In 2018 and 2019, the Berliners became the German League's runners-up, under his leadership. In the 2018–19 season, the Spaniard head coach also led Alba Berlin to the final of the secondary level European-wide club competition, the EuroCup, and he also won the EuroCup Coach of the Year award. Under his guidance, Alba Berlin also captured the German League championship title, as well as the German Cup title, in the 2019–20 campaign. García Reneses also won the German League championship with Alba, in the 2020–21 season.

== National team coaching career ==
=== Spanish junior national team ===
García Reneses won the bronze medal with the Spanish Under-16 junior national team, at the 1979 FIBA Europe Under-16 Championship.

=== Spanish senior national team ===
In June 2008, García Reneses became the head coach of the senior men's Spanish national team, after he replaced Pepu Hernández in the role.

In the 2008 Beijing Summer Olympics' closely contested gold medal game against Team USA, Spain was trailing by just 2 points, with a few minutes left in the game. However, they eventually lost the game to the Redeem Team, by a score of 118–107.

== Personal life ==
During his time in Barcelona, when he was a member of the FC Barcelona senior men's basketball team, García Reneses also studied physics and telecommunications. He would later go on to design electronic basketball scoreboards, which have been installed in more than thirty indoor arenas throughout Spain.
