= Audie Norris =

American basketball player and coach (born 1960)

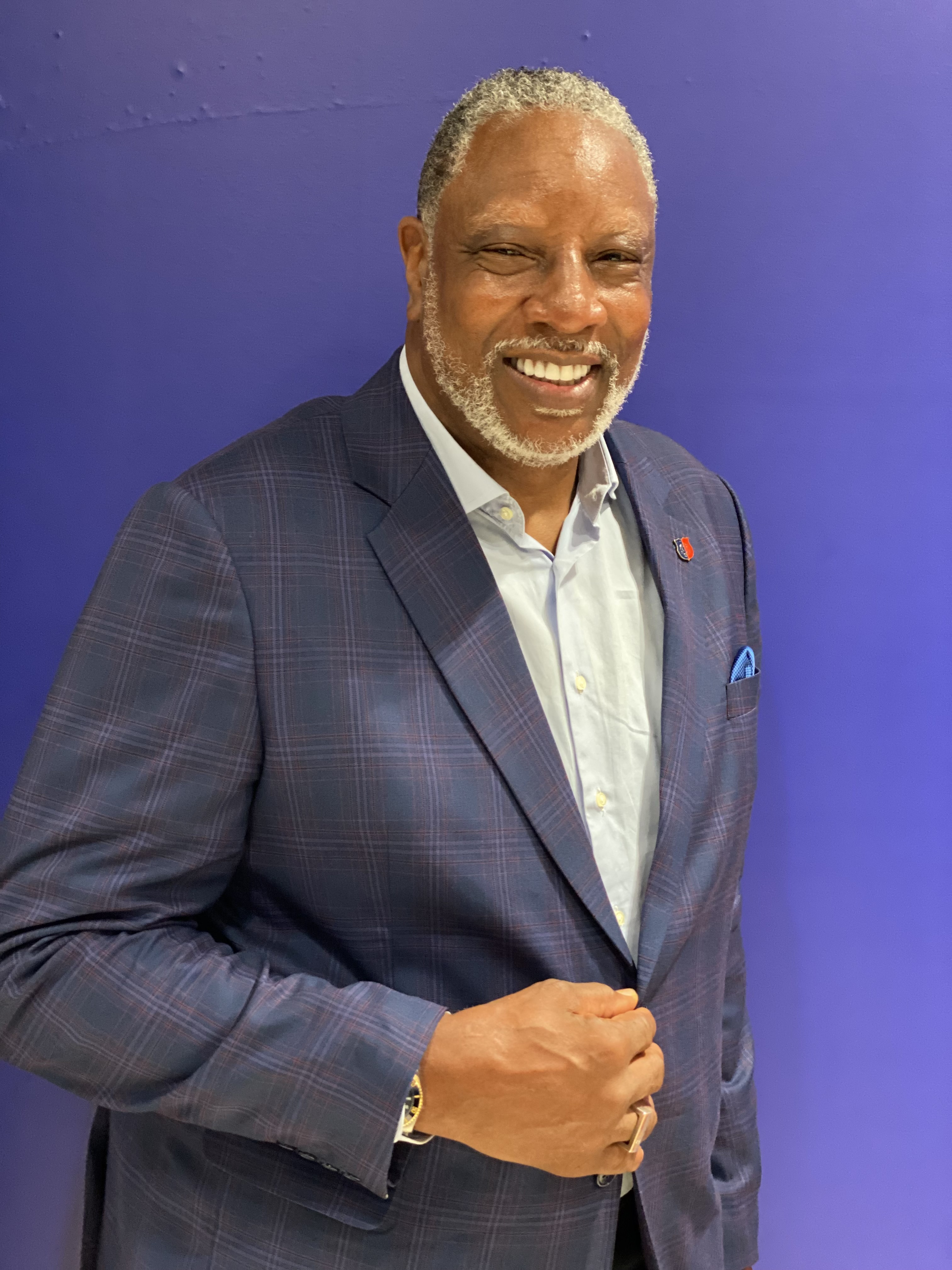
- Norris in 2025

Personal information
- Born: December 18, 1960 (age 65) Jackson, Mississippi, U.S.
- Listed height: 6 ft 9 in (2.06 m)
- Listed weight: 230 lb (104 kg)

Career information
- High school: Jim Hill (Jackson, Mississippi)
- College: Jackson State (1978–1982)
- NBA draft: 1982: 2nd round, 37th overall pick
- Drafted by: Portland Trail Blazers
- Playing career: 1982–1994
- Position: Power forward / center
- Number: 24
- Coaching career: 2014–2016

Career history

Playing
- 1982–1985: Portland Trail Blazers
- 1985–1987: Benetton Treviso
- 1987–1993: FC Barcelona
- 1993–1994: Nikas Peristeri

Coaching
- 2014–2016: CDB Sevilla (assistant)

Career highlights
- As player: 3× Spanish League champion (1988, 1989, 1990); 2× Spanish King's Cup winner (1988, 1991); Spanish Super Cup winner (1987); 2× Spanish League All-Star (1988, 1990); Italian League All-Star (1986); Spanish Prince's Cup winner (1988); Catalan League champion (1989)
- Stats at NBA.com
- Stats at Basketball Reference

Audie James Norris (born December 18, 1960) is an American former professional basketball player and coach. Norris played for the National Basketball Association's Portland Trail Blazers, from 1982 to 1985. His former teammate Mychal Thompson gave him the nickname "The Atomic Dog", because of his brutal in-game dunks.

After retiring from playing professional basketball in 1994, Norris has spent his time coaching and developing the skills of young student athletes. With more than 10 years as a consultant to European basketball teams, he has over 18 years of basketball coaching experience, on several levels of competition, from the cadet level to semi-pro men's leagues. He is a certified Spanish Basketball Federation (FEB) Basketball Superior Coach, and a member of the Spanish Basketball Coaches Association, AEEB.

Norris was also named an NBA Ambassador, by the league's commissioner Adam Silver, and he has participated in the NBA Ambassador programs, with Jr. NBA and NBA Cares. His brother Sylvester Norris was also a player for the NBA's San Antonio Spurs.

== College career ==
Norris played college basketball at Jackson State University, with the Tigers, from 1978 to 1982, while he studied Therapeutic Recreation and Special Education. During his time at Jackson State, he accumulated numerous accolades during those 4 years. He was named Freshman of the Year, and was a two-time league MVP.

He was inducted into the Jackson State University Athletics Hall of Fame in 1998.

== Professional career ==
Norris was selected by the Portland Trail Blazers in the second round of the 1982 NBA draft with the 37th overall pick of the draft. In three seasons with the Trail Blazers in the NBA, he averaged 4.4 points, 3.1 rebounds, and 0.8 assists per game. After that, Norris moved to Europe, to continue playing professional basketball.

After he left the NBA, Norris spent the two seasons playing in the Italian League, with Benetton Treviso. He was an Italian League All-Star in 1986.

He then spent the next six seasons of his career in the Spanish League with FC Barcelona. While with Barcelona, Norris played on one of the best teams in Europe at that time. Some of his teammates with the club included "Epi", Nacho Solozábal, Andrés Jiménez, and Chicho Sibilio.

With Barcelona, Norris won three Spanish League championships (1988, 1989, and 1990), two Spanish King's Cup titles (1988 and 1991), the Spanish Super Cup title (1987), the second-tier Spanish Prince's Cup title (1988), and the Catalan League title (1989). With Barcelona, he also played in three straight EuroLeague Final Fours (1989, 1990, and 1991), where he also made the EuroLeague Finals in consecutive years (1990 and 1991). He was a two-time Spanish League All-Star (1988 and 1990), and he was also voted to the 1991 EuroLeague All-Final Four Team.

Norris finished his club career playing in the Greek League. He played with Peristeri Athens, during the 1993–94 season. In total, Norris played 12 seasons as a professional basketball player.

== Coaching career ==
During his basketball coaching career, Norris has served as an assistant coach for the Jackson State Tigers, head coach of the Saint Joseph Catholic High School girls basketball team, assistant basketball coach of the Tougaloo College girls basketball team, head coach of the Jackson State Lady Tigers, assistant coach of the Jackson Rage Pro team, head coach at Genesis One Christian Prep School, and head coach of the New Horizon Preparatory School. He has also had coaching appearances with the National Basketball Association, Top 100 Camp, Uariachi Hoop Camp, 5-Star Basketball Camp, Mo Williams Skill Development Camp, and the Emvipi Foundation Academy.

Since 2012, he has also worked at his camps and basketball clinics worldwide, in countries such as Spain, Senegal, Greece, South Africa, and at the annual summer Audie Norris Basketball Camp, which is held at L'Hospitalet de Llobregat, in Barcelona.

In 2014, Norris signed with the Spanish ACB League team CDB Sevilla, as an assistant coach. However, he was officially listed as the team's head coach, instead of Scott Roth, whose coaching license had not yet been processed by the Liga ACB. He was hired to coach the team's post players, two of whom later went on to play in the NBA: Kristaps Porziņģis and Willy Hernangómez.

In 2016, Norris took over as the head coach of the Jump10 Elite Training Camp, and he then served as the head coach of the Chinese team that was participating in the World Jump10 Hoops Challenge in Shanghai, where the team finished in 4th place. In September 2016, Norris worked for a month coaching the post players of the Chinese Basketball Association team Guangzhou Long-Lions. Two of those players were sent to the Spanish league team Movistar Estudiantes.

== Personal life ==
Norris' older brother, Sylvester, is also a former NBA player. He played with the San Antonio Spurs.

== Career statistics ==
Legend
GP	Games played	GS	Games started	MPG	Minutes per game
FG%	Field goal percentage	3P%	3-point field goal percentage	FT%	Free throw percentage
RPG	Rebounds per game	APG	Assists per game	SPG	Steals per game
BPG	Blocks per game	PPG	Points per game	**Bold**	Career high

=== NBA ===
==== Regular season ====
Year	Team	GP	GS	MPG	FG%	3P%	FT%	RPG	APG	SPG	BPG	PPG
1982–83	Portland	30	0	10.4	.413	–	.467	2.3	.8	.4	.1	2.2
1983–84	Portland	**79**	1	**14.6**	.504	–	**.698**	**3.3**	**1.0**	.4	**.4**	4.5
1984–85	Portland	78	**13**	14.3	**.543**	.000	.665	3.2	.6	**.5**	**.4**	**5.1**
Career		187	14	13.8	.511	.000	.662	3.1	.8	.5	.4	4.4

==== Playoffs ====
Year	Team	GP	GS	MPG	FG%	3P%	FT%	RPG	APG	SPG	BPG	PPG
1983	Portland	7		7.6	.538	–	.500	1.7	.7	.3	.3	2.1
1984	Portland	5		10.4	**.600**	–	**.625**	3.2	**.8**	.2	.2	3.4
1985	Portland	**8**	0	**13.6**	.594	–	.409	**5.4**	.4	**.5**	**.6**	**5.9**
Career		20	0	10.7	.582	–	.469	3.6	.6	.4	.4	4.0
