= Cándido Sibilio =

Dominican-Spanish basketball player (1958–2019)

Chicho Sibilio
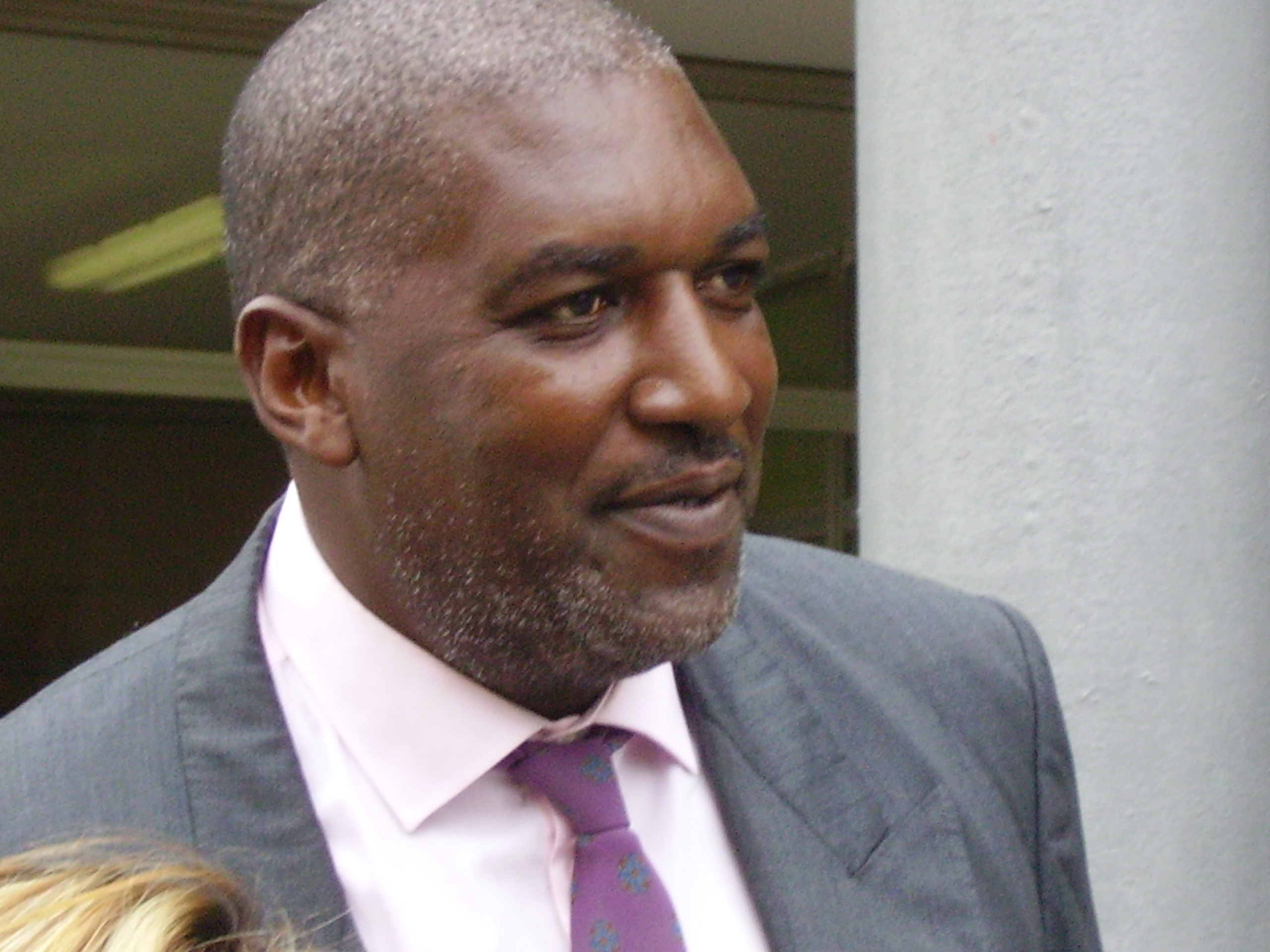
- Chicho Sibilio in 2006

Personal information
- Born: 3 October 1958 San Cristóbal, Dominican Republic
- Died: 10 August 2019 (aged 60) San Gregorio de Nigua, Dominican Republic
- Listed height: 6 ft 8 in (2.03 m)
- Listed weight: 223 lb (101 kg)

Career information
- Playing career: 1976–1993
- Position: Small forward
- Number: 6
- Coaching career: 2001–2009

Career history

Playing
- 1976–1989: Barcelona
- 1989–1993: Tau Vitoria

Coaching
- 2001: Cañeros de la Romana
- 2005: Los Prados
- 2009: San Carlos

Career highlights
- As player: FIBA Club World Cup champion (1985); European Super Cup champion (1986); 2× FIBA European Cup Winner's Cup champion (1985, 1986); FIBA Korać Cup champion (1987); 101 Greats of European Basketball (2018); 5× Spanish League champion (1981, 1983, 1987–1989); 8× Spanish Cup winner (1978–1983, 1987, 1988); Spanish Super Cup winner (1987); Asturias Cup winner (1988); Gigantes del Basket Spanish League Best Sixth Man (1990); 2× Spanish League All-Star (1987, 1990); Spanish All-Star Game MVP (1990); Dominican Sports Hall of Fame (2003); ISF World Schools' Championship champion (1977)
Medals
Men's basketball
Representing Dominican Republic
FIBA CentroBasket
Gold medal – first place	1977 Panama
Representing Spain
FIBA EuroBasket
Silver medal – second place	1983 France

Cándido Antonio Sibilio Hughes, most commonly known as Chicho Sibilio (Note: In this Spanish name, the first or paternal surname is Sibilio and the second or maternal family name is Hughes.) (3 October 1958 – 10 August 2019), was a Dominican-Spanish professional basketball player and coach. During his pro club playing career, Sibilio, who was well-known for being a great three-point shooter, won the FIBA Club World Cup championship in 1985, and the European Super Cup championship in 1986. He was also a EuroLeague Finalist in 1984.

As a member of the senior Spanish national team, he competed in the men's tournament at the 1980 Moscow Summer Olympic Games.

== Early years and youth career ==
Sibilio was born and raised in the Dominican Republic. He grew up starring in youth team competitions in the sports of baseball and basketball. In February 1976, at the age of 17, he moved to Spain. He acquired Spanish citizenship roughly a year later, on 16 June 1977. With Barca's youth team, he won the ISF World Schools' Championship in 1977.

== Professional career ==
During his professional club career, Sibilio played with the Spanish club Barcelona, from 1976 to 1989. With Barcelona, he won Spain's top-tier level Spanish Primera División and Spanish ACB league championship five times, in the years 1981, 1983, 1987, 1988, and 1989. With Barcelona, he also won eight Spanish Cup titles (1978, 1979, 1980, 1981, 1982, 1983, 1987, and 1988), and the Spanish Super Cup title in 1987.

With Barcelona, in international club competition, he won the European-wide 2nd-tier level FIBA European Cup Winner's Cup championship, in the 1984–85 and 1985–86 seasons, and the European-wide 3rd-tier level FIBA Korać Cup championship, in the 1986–87 season. He also won the European Super Cup championship in 1986, and the 1985 edition of the FIBA Club World Cup championship. He was never able to win Europe's top-tier level club competition, the EuroLeague, however he did play in the EuroLeague Finals in the 1983–84 season, and in the 1989 EuroLeague Final Four.

Sibilio also played with the Spanish club Tau Vitoria, before he retired, and put an end to his club playing career, after the conclusion of the 1992–93 Spanish League season.

== National team career ==
=== Dominican Republic ===
Sibilio was a member of the senior men's Dominican Republic national team. With the Dominican Republic, he played at the 1975 FIBA CentroBasket, and the 1977 FIBA CentroBasket. He won the gold medal at the 1977 FIBA CentroBasket.

=== Spain ===
Sibilio was also a member of the senior men's Spanish national team. With Spain's senior national team, he played at the following major FIBA international tournaments: the 1980 Summer Olympics, the 1981 FIBA EuroBasket, the 1982 FIBA World Cup, the 1983 FIBA EuroBasket, the 1985 FIBA EuroBasket, the 1986 FIBA World Cup, and the 1987 FIBA EuroBasket.

He won the silver medal with Spain at the 1983 FIBA EuroBasket. With Spain's national team, he had a total of 87 caps, in which he scored a total of 1,324 points, for a career national team scoring average of 15.2 points per game.

== Death ==
Sibilio died on 10 August 2019, at a property he owned in San Gregorio de Nigua, on the southern coast of the Dominican Republic.
