= 1989 Copa del Rey de Baloncesto =

The 1989 Copa del Rey was the 53rd edition of the Spanish basketball Cup. It was organized by the ACB and its Final Eight was played in A Coruña, in the Pazo dos Deportes de Riazor between 15 and 17 November 1988.

This edition was played by the 24 teams of the 1988–89 ACB season. The eight first qualified teams of the previous season qualified directly to the Round of 16.

== First round ==
Teams #2 played the second leg at home.

Team 1	Agg.	Team 2	1st leg	2nd leg	
Puleva Baloncesto	161–153	Pamesa Valencia	84–76	77–77	{{{8}}}
Cacaolat Granollers	179–184	BBV Collado Villalba	90–92	89–92	{{{8}}}
Grupo IFA Español	157–168	Cajabilbao	83–81	74–87	{{{8}}}
TDK Manresa	166–165	DYC Breogán	88–89	78–76	{{{8}}}
Clesa Ferrol	168–197	Taugrés Baskonia	94–98	74–99	{{{8}}}
Valvi Girona	162–153	Tenerife Nº1	84–79	78–74	{{{8}}}
CB Gran Canaria	170–162	Mayoral Maristas	70–70	100–92	{{{8}}}
Caja de Ronda	180–158	Caja Guipúzcoa	85–93	95–65	{{{8}}}

== Round of 16 ==
Team 1	Agg.	Team 2	1st leg	2nd leg
Real Madrid	220–172	Puleva Baloncesto	98–83	122–89
BBV Collado Villalba	182–195	Magia de Huesca	90–95	92–100
RAM Joventut	158–143	Cajabilbao	79–72	79–71
TDK Manresa	174–175	Estudiantes Bose	75–75	79–80
FC Barcelona	174–163	Taugrés	93–82	81–81
Valvi Girona	172–174	Fórum Valladolid	81–73	91–101
CB Gran Canaria	148–176	CAI Zaragoza	82–84	66–92
Caja de Ronda	156–146	Cajacanarias	81–80	75–66

== Final Eight Bracket ==
Quarterfinals; 15 November
RAM Joventut	86
Estudiantes Bose	71
Real Madrid	88
Magia de Huesca	64
FC Barcelona	91
Fórum Valladolid	80
CAI Zaragoza	115
Caja de Ronda	110

Semifinals; 16 November
RAM Joventut	74
Real Madrid	99
FC Barcelona	88
CAI Zaragoza	78

Final; 17 November
Real Madrid	85
FC Barcelona	81

== Final ==
Real Madrid won its 21st title thanks to 27 points of Petrović, who won at A Coruña his only title in Spain.

17 November 1988
20:30 GTM+1

Boxscore

Real Madrid	85–81	FC Barcelona
Scoring by half: 43–48, 42–33
Pts: Petrović 27; Rebs: Rogers 6 Asts: Martín, Petrović 2 PIR: Rogers 22		Pts: Epi 20; Rebs: Norris 15; Asts: Waiters 3 PIR: Norris 21

Riazor, A Coruña
Attendance: 8,000
Referees: Jesús León Arencibia, Álvaro Herrera

1989 Copa del Rey Champions

Real Madrid
21st title
