= 1990 Copa del Rey de Baloncesto =

54th Spanish Basketball Cup

The 1990 Copa del Rey was the 54th edition of the Spanish basketball Cup. It was organized by the ACB and its Final Eight was played in Las Palmas, in the Centro Insular de Deportes between 10 and 13 February 1990.

This edition was played by the 24 teams of the 1989–90 ACB season. The eight first qualified teams of the previous season qualified directly to the Round of 16.

== First round ==
Teams #2 played the second leg at home.

Team 1	Agg.	Team 2	1st leg	2nd leg	
BBV Collado Villalba	142–168	Cajabilbao	67–68	75–100	{{{8}}}
Huesca La Magia	163–165	DYC Breogán	92–79	71–86	{{{8}}}
Puleva Baloncesto	164–174	TDK Manresa	83–83	81–91	{{{8}}}
Cajacanarias	168–191	Estudiantes Caja Postal	83–79	85–114	{{{8}}}
Pamesa Valencia	177–150	Tenerife Nº1	86–59	91–91	{{{8}}}
CB Gran Canaria	142–145	Caja San Fernando	72–69	70–76	{{{8}}}
Fórum Valladolid	149–142	Caixa Ourense	82–81	67–61	{{{8}}}
Mayoral Maristas	166–157	Clesa Ferrol	86–77	80–83	{{{8}}}

== Round of 16 ==
Team 1	Agg.	Team 2	1st leg	2nd leg
Cajabilbao	160–178	RAM Joventut	77–85	83–93
Caja Ronda	140–160	DYC Breogán	57–78	83–82
TDK Manresa	148–203	FC Barcelona	80–102	68–101
Grupo IFA	169–150	Estudiantes Caja Postal	83–70	86–80
CAI Zaragoza	185–171	Pamesa Valencia	113–88	72–83
Caja San Fernando	154–174	Valvi Girona	73–83	81–91
Fórum Valladolid	158–182	Real Madrid	67–78	91–104
Taugrés Baskonia	190–176	Mayoral Maristas	94–86	96–90

== Final Eight Bracket ==
Quarterfinals; 10 February
FC Barcelona	83
Grupo IFA	85
RAM Joventut	94
DYC Breogán	78
Real Madrid Otaysa	84
Taugrés Baskonia	82
CAI Zaragoza	85
Valvi Girona	79

Semifinals; 11 February
Grupo IFA	81
RAM Joventut	93
Real Madrid Otaysa	73
CAI Zaragoza	74

Final; 13 February
CAI Zaragoza	76
RAM Joventut	69

== Final ==
After eliminating Real Madrid Otaysa in the previous semifinal, CAI Zaragoza beat RAM Joventut in the Final for achieving its second Cup. Mark Davis scored 44 points, the highest performance in a Copa del Rey Final.

This was the first final without Real Madrid and FC Barcelona since 1968.

13 February 1990
19:00 GTM+1

Boxscore

RAM Joventut	69–76	CAI Zaragoza
Scoring by half: 35–38, 34–38
Pts: Villacampa 22; Rebs: Lampley, Morales 7 Asts: three players 1 PIR: Lampley 14		Pts: Davis 44; Rebs: Belostenny 9 Asts: Arcega, Davis 2 PIR: Davis 37

Centro Insular de Deportes, Las Palmas
Attendance: 5,200
Referees: Francisco Javier Fajardo, Miguel Ángel Betancor

1990 Copa del Rey Champions

CAI Zaragoza
2nd title

- MVP of the Tournament: Mark Davis
