= 1991 Copa del Rey de Baloncesto =

55th edition of the Spanish basketball Cup

The 1991 Copa del Rey was the 55th edition of the Spanish basketball Cup. It was organized by the ACB and its Final Eight was played in Zaragoza, in the Pabellón Príncipe Felipe between 22 and 25 February 1991.

This edition was played by the 24 teams of the 1990–91 ACB season. The four first qualified teams of the previous season qualified directly to the Final Eight while teams 5 to 8 joined the competition in the third round.

== First round ==
Teams #2 played the second leg at home.

Team 1	Agg.	Team 2	1st leg	2nd leg	
Huesca La Magia	146–157	OAR Ferrol	78–70	68–87	{{{8}}}
TDK Manresa	197–181	Atlético Madrid Villalba	104–90	93–91	{{{8}}}
Caja San Fernando	192–169	Caixa Ourense	93–74	99–95	{{{8}}}
Puleva Granada	156–161	Mayoral Maristas	89–86	67–75	{{{8}}}
DYC Breogán	156–163	Cajacanarias	68–71	88–92	{{{8}}}
Elosúa León	153–148	Grupo IFA Granollers	75–73	78–75	{{{8}}}
Valvi Girona	168–161	Cajabilbao	95–88	73–73	{{{8}}}
Júver Murcia	127–164	Pamesa Valencia	54–86	73–78	{{{8}}}

== Second round ==
Team 1	Agg.	Team 2	1st leg	2nd leg	
OAR Ferrol	149–154	TDK Manresa	71–75	78–79	{{{8}}}
Caja San Fernando	179–169	Mayoral Maristas	77–79	102–90	
Cajacanarias	179–207	Elosúa León	90–109	89–98	{{{8}}}
Valvi Girona	143–140	Pamesa Valencia	71–69	73–71	

== Third round ==
Team 1	Agg.	Team 2	1st leg	2nd leg
Fórum Valladolid	138–161	TDK Manresa	69–84	77–69
CAI Zaragoza	173–155	Caja San Fernando	82–71	91–84
Taugrés Baskonia	155–146	Caja de Ronda	73–58	82–88
Elosúa León	185–170	Valvi Girona	84–81	101–89

== Final Eight Bracket ==
Quarterfinals; 21–22 February
Montigalà Joventut	83
TDK Manresa	81
CAI Zaragoza	70
Estudiantes Caja Postal	76
FC Barcelona	98
Taugrés Baskonia	79
Real Madrid Otaysa	71
Elosúa León	70

Semifinals; 23 February
Montigalà Joventut	71
Estudiantes Caja Postal	81
FC Barcelona	82
Real Madrid Otaysa	81

Final; 24 February
Estudiantes Caja Postal	65
FC Barcelona	67
Third place
Montigalà Joventut	79
Real Madrid Otaysa	63

== Final ==
24 February 1991
20:00 GTM+1

Boxscore

FC Barcelona	67–65	Estudiantes Caja Postal
Scoring by half: 32–34, 35–31
Pts: Ortiz 19; Rebs: Ortiz 9 Asts: Epi, Norris 2 PIR: Ortiz 23		Pts: Winslow 27; Rebs: Winslow 10; Asts: Antúnez 4 PIR: Winslow 30

Pabellón Príncipe Felipe, Zaragoza
Attendance: 9,500
Referees: Francisco Javier Fajardo, Mateo Ramos

1991 Copa del Rey Champions

FC Barcelona
16th title

- MVP of the Tournament: Juan Antonio Orenga
