= 1992–93 Primera División de Baloncesto =

The 1992–93 Primera División season was the second category of the Spanish basketball league system during the 1992–93 season. It was the third played with the name of Primera División.

== Format ==
32 teams played this season and were divided into two groups of 16 teams called Group A and Group B.

- First Phase
  - Group A, teams that the previous season earned their place in the category. They play all against all to two turns.
  - Group B, teams that the previous season had relegated, were re-caught or invited. They play all against all to two turns.
- Second Phase
  - Group A1, made up of those classified in the 1st, 4th, 5th, 8th and 9th positions of group A and 2nd of B.
  - Group A2, made up of those classified in the 2nd, 3rd, 6th, 7th and 10th positions of group A and 1st of B.
  - Group B1, made up of those classified in the 11th and 16th positions of group A plus the 5th and 6th of B.
  - Group B2, made up of those classified in 12th place of group A plus 4th, 7th and 12th of B.
  - Group B3, made up of those classified in the 13th position of group A plus the 3rd, 8th and 11th of B.
  - Group B4, made up of those classified in the 14th and 15th positions of group A plus 9th and 10th of B.
- The top 4 finishers of groups A1 and A2 play two rounds of qualifying for promotion playoffs, to the best of 3 matches (the second and third matches are played at the home of the best classified in the previous phase) the first and at best of 5 the second (the first, second and fifth matches are played at the home of the best classified in the previous phase). The winners go up to the ACB League. In addition, the promoted players play a round-trip tie to determine the category champion.
- The 1st classified of groups B1, B2, B3 and B4 earn the right to be the following season in group A.
- The last 4 classified in group B go down directly to the Segunda División.

== Teams ==
=== Promotion and relegation (pre-season) ===
A total of 32 teams contested the league, including 11 sides from the 1991–92 season, three relegated from the 1991–92 ACB, four promoted from the Segunda División and fourteen Wild Cards.

Teams relegated from Liga ACB

- Gran Canaria
- CB Granada
- Collado Villalba, who resigned to participate in 1992–93 ACB season.

Teams promoted from Segunda División

- Tano Gandía
- Europolis Las Rozas
- Baloncesto Fuenlabrada
- Loyola Easo

Wild Cards

- CB Melilla, who obtained a relegation place the previous season.
- Centre Comercial Llobregat
- Conservas Daroca
- UDEA Algeciras
- Down Tarragona
- CB Mataró
- Caja Cantabria
- CAB Loja
- Cajasur Córdoba
- CB Castellón
- Unicaja Mayoral
- CB Vetusta
- San Isidro
- Hyundai Nautico
- Pan de Azucar Zamora

=== Venues and locations ===
Location of teams in 1992–93 1ªDivisión
Red: Group A; Green: Group B
Location of teams from the Canary Islands in 1992–93 1ªDivisión
Location of teams in 1992–93 1ªDivisión (Community of Madrid)

Team	Home city
Baloncesto Fuenlabrada	Fuenlabrada
CAB Loja	Loja
Caja Badajoz	Badajoz
Caja Bilbao	Bilbao
Caja Cantabria	Torrelavega
Cajasur Córdoba	Córdoba
CB Askatuak	San Sebastián
CB Canarias	San Cristóbal de la Laguna
CB Castellón	Castellón de la Plana
CB Granada	Granada
CB Guadalajara	Guadalajara
CB Mataró	Mataró
CB Melilla	Melilla
CB Vetusta	Oviedo
Centre Comercial Llobregat	Cornellà de Llobregat
Clas Gijón	Gijón
Collado Villalba	Collado Villalba
Conservas Daroca	Zaragoza
Down Tarragona	Tarragona
ElMonte Huelva	Huelva
Europolis Las Rozas	Las Rozas
Gran Canaria	Las Palmas
Hyundai Naútico	Santa Cruz de Tenerife
Juventud Alcalá	Alcalá de Henares
Loyola Easo	San Sebastián
Pan de Azucar Zamora	Zamora
Patronato Mallorca	Palma de Mallorca
San Isidro	La Orotava
Tano Gandía	Gandía
UDEA Algeciras	Algeciras
Unicaja Mayoral	Málaga
Viña Costeira	La Coruña

== First phase ==
=== Group A ===
Pos	Team	Pld	W	L	PF	PA	PD	Pts	Qualification or relegation
1	CB Guadalajara	28	21	7	2387	2132	+255	49	Qualification to A1
2	Caja Bilbao	28	20	8	2222	2012	+210	48	Qualification to A2
3	Gran Canaria	28	18	10	2243	2203	+40	46	Qualification to A2
4	Viña Costeira	28	17	11	2143	2103	+40	45	Qualification to A1
5	CB Canarias	28	16	12	2347	2268	+79	44	Qualification to A1
6	ElMonte Huelva	28	15	13	2182	2134	+48	43	Qualification to A2
7	CB Askatuak	28	14	14	2285	2269	+16	42	Qualification to A2
8	CB Granada	28	14	14	2225	2195	+30	42	Qualification to A1
9	Tano Gandía	28	13	15	2003	2058	−55	41	Qualification to A1
10	Europolis Las Rozas	28	13	15	2223	2182	+41	41	Qualification to A2
11	Baloncesto Fuenlabrada	28	13	15	2197	2293	−96	41	Qualification to B1
12	Clas Gijón	28	11	17	2039	2206	−167	39	Qualification to B2
13	Loyola Easo	28	10	18	2299	2424	−125	38	Qualification to B3
14	Caja Badajoz	28	8	20	2178	2363	−185	36	Qualification to B4
15	Juventud Alcalá	28	7	21	2036	2197	−161	35	Qualification to B4
16	Patronato Mallorca	0	0	0	0	0	0	0	Relegation to Segunda División

Source: League at JM Almenzar website

=== Group B ===
Pos	Team	Pld	W	L	PF	PA	PD	Pts	Qualification or relegation
1	Centre Comercial Llobregat	30	27	3	2599	2260	+339	57	Qualification to A2
2	Conservas Daroca	30	23	7	2597	2211	+386	53	Qualification to A1
3	UDEA Algeciras	30	20	10	2598	2537	+61	50	Qualification to B3
4	Down Tarragona	30	19	11	2427	2347	+80	49	Qualification to B2
5	CB Mataró	30	18	12	2398	2330	+68	48	Qualification to B1
6	Caja Cantabria	30	16	14	2304	2343	−39	46	Qualification to B1
7	Collado Villalba	30	16	14	2273	2224	+49	46	Qualification to B2
8	CAB Loja	30	15	15	2282	2263	+19	45	Qualification to B3
9	Cajasur Córdoba	30	15	15	2305	2423	−118	45	Qualification to B4
10	CB Melilla	30	15	15	2477	2540	−63	45	Qualification to B4
11	CB Castellón	30	15	15	2363	2348	+15	45	Qualification to B3
12	Unicaja Mayoral	30	10	20	2119	2180	−61	40	Qualification to B2
13	CB Vetusta	30	9	21	2189	2405	−216	39	Qualification to B1
14	San Isidro	30	9	21	2218	2401	−183	39	Relegation to Segunda División
15	Hyundai Naútico	30	9	21	2563	2645	−82	39	Relegation to Segunda División
16	Pan de Azucar Zamora	30	5	25	2431	2686	−255	35	Relegation to Segunda División

Source: League at JM Almenzar website

== Second phase ==
=== Group A1 ===
Pos	Team	Pld	W	L	PF	PA	PD	Pts	Qualification or relegation
1	CB Granada	10	7	3	740	755	−15	17	Qualification to Promotion Playoffs
2	CB Guadalajara	10	6	4	782	750	+32	16	Qualification to Promotion Playoffs
3	Tano Gandía	10	6	4	706	700	+6	16	Qualification to Promotion Playoffs
4	CB Canarias	10	4	6	817	784	+33	14	Qualification to Promotion Playoffs
5	Conservas Daroca	10	4	6	791	825	−34	14	
6	Viña Costeira	10	3	7	731	777	−46	13	

Source: League at JM Almenzar website

=== Group A2 ===
Pos	Team	Pld	W	L	PF	PA	PD	Pts	Qualification or relegation
1	Caja Bilbao	10	9	1	826	629	+197	19	Qualification to Promotion Playoffs
2	Centre Comercial Llobregat	10	7	3	800	755	+45	17	Qualification to Promotion Playoffs
3	CB Askatuak	10	6	4	772	767	+5	16	Qualification to Promotion Playoffs
4	ElMonte Huelva	10	4	6	754	812	−58	14	Qualification to Promotion Playoffs
5	Gran Canaria	10	2	8	712	784	−72	12	
6	Europolis Las Rozas	10	2	8	757	810	−53	12	

Source: League at JM Almenzar website

=== Group B1 ===
Pos	Team	Pld	W	L	PF	PA	PD	Pts	Qualification or relegation
1	Caja Cantabria	6	5	1	514	458	+56	11	Promotion to Group A
2	CB Mataró	6	4	2	465	455	+10	10	
3	Baloncesto Fuenlabrada	6	3	3	514	472	+42	9	
4	CB Vetusta	6	0	6	393	501	−108	6	

Source: League at JM Almenzar website

=== Group B2 ===
Pos	Team	Pld	W	L	PF	PA	PD	Pts	Qualification or relegation
1	Down Tarragona	6	4	2	499	478	+21	10	Promotion to Group A
2	Clas Gijón	6	4	2	470	444	+26	10	
3	Collado Villalba	6	2	4	475	481	−6	8	
4	Unicaja Mayoral	6	2	4	423	458	−35	8	

Source: League at JM Almenzar website

=== Group B3 ===
Pos	Team	Pld	W	L	PF	PA	PD	Pts	Qualification or relegation
1	CAB Loja	6	5	1	503	485	+18	11	Promotion to Group A
2	Loyola Easo	6	4	2	531	511	+20	10	
3	UDEA Algeciras	6	2	4	488	487	+1	8	
4	CB Castellón	6	1	5	472	511	−39	7	

Source: League at JM Almenzar website

=== Group B4 ===
Pos	Team	Pld	W	L	PF	PA	PD	Pts	Qualification or relegation
1	Juventud Alcalá	6	6	0	533	446	+87	12	Promotion to Group A
2	Caja Badajoz	6	3	3	499	518	−19	9	
3	CB Melilla	6	2	4	493	527	−34	8	
4	Cajasur Córdoba	6	1	5	468	502	−34	7	

Source: League at JM Almenzar website

== Promotion Playoffs ==
The two winners of the semifinals are promoted to Liga ACB.

Quarterfinals
A2-4 ElMonte Huelva	57	85
A1-1 CB Granada	53	81
A1-3 Tano Gandía	64	61
A2-2 Centre Comercial Llobregat	72	70
A2-1 Caja Bilbao	87	99
A1-4 CB Canarias	68	81
A1-2 CB Guadalajara	84	85
A2-3 CB Askatuak	79	81

Semifinals
A2-4 ElMonte Huelva	69	69	63	72
A2-2 C.C. Llobregat	57	83	81	96
A1-2 CB Guadalajara	69	71	57	84
A2-1 Caja Bilbao	59	69	67	78

Finals
A2-2 Centre Comercial Llobregat	82	90
A1-2 CB Guadalajara	94	64

== Final standings ==
Pos	Team	Pld	W	L	Qualification or relegation
1	Centre Comercial Llobregat	48	40	8	Promoted to ACB
2	CB Guadalajara	46	33	13	Promoted to ACB
3	Caja Bilbao	44	32	12	
4	ElMonte Huelva	44	22	22	
5	CB Canarias	40	20	20	
6	CB Askatuak	40	20	20	Resigned to participate next season
7	CB Granada	40	21	19	Dissolved at the end of the season
8	Tano Gandía	40	19	21	
9	Gran Canaria	38	20	18	
10	Viña Costeira	38	20	18	
11	Europolis Las Rozas	38	15	23	
12	Conservas Daroca	40	27	13	Resigned to participate next season
13	Juventud Alcalá	34	13	21	
14	Down Tarragona	36	23	13	
15	Caja Cantabria	36	21	15	
16	CAB Loja	36	20	16	
17	Baloncesto Fuenlabrada	34	16	18	
18	Clas Gijón	34	15	19	
19	Loyola Easo	34	14	20	Resigned to participate next season
20	Caja Badajoz	34	11	23	
21	UDEA Algeciras	36	22	14	
22	CB Mataró	36	22	14	Resigned to participate next season
23	Collado Villalba	36	18	18	Dissolved at the end of the season
24	Cajasur Córdoba	36	16	20	
25	CB Melilla	36	17	19	
26	CB Castellón	36	16	20	
27	Unicaja Mayoral	36	12	24	
28	CB Vetusta	36	9	27	
29	San Isidro (R)	30	9	21	Relegation to Segunda División
30	Hyundai Naútico	30	9	21	Relegation to Segunda División
31	Pan de Azucar Zamora	30	5	25	Relegation to Segunda División
32	Patronato Mallorca (R)	0	0	0	Relegation to Segunda División

Source: hispaligas.net
(R) Relegated
