= Sibilio =

Sibilio is a surname. Notable people with the surname include:

- Alessandro Sibilio (born 1999), Italian hurdler and sprinter
- Cándido Sibilio (1958–2019), Dominican-Spanish basketball player
