= 1991–92 Primera División de Baloncesto =

The 1991–92 Primera División season was the second category of the Spanish basketball league system during the 1991–92 season. It was the second played with the name of Primera División.

== Format ==
16 teams played this season.

- Regular Season
  - League of 16 teams in a single group where they play all against all in two rounds.
- Second Phase
  - Group A1, made up of those classified in 1st, 4th, 5th and 8th positions.
  - Group A2, made up of those classified in the 2nd, 3rd, 6th and 7th positions.
  - Group B1, made up of those classified in positions 9th, 12th, 13th and 16th.
  - Group B2, made up of those classified in the 10th, 11th, 14th and 15th positions.
- Champions playoff
  - The winners of groups A1 and A2 play a best-of-5 tie, the winner of which goes directly to the ACB League and the loser goes to the promotion playoffs, starting in the second round.
- Promotion playoffs
  - Teams classified between 2nd and 4th place in groups A1 and A2 play three rounds of knockout rounds for promotion to the best of 5 games. From the second round they are joined by the loser of the Champions playoff. The winner goes up to the ACB League.
- Relegation playoffs
  - The 2nd and 3rd classified of groups B1 and B2 play a best-of-5 tie with the winners remaining and the losers relegated.
  - The last 2 classified in groups B1 and B2 go directly to Segunda División.

== Teams ==
=== Promotion and relegation (pre-season) ===
A total of 16 teams contested the league, including 10 sides from the 1990–91 season, two relegated from the 1990–91 ACB, one promoted from the Segunda División and three Wild Cards.

Teams relegated from Liga ACB

- Caja Bilbao
- CB Canarias

Teams promoted from Segunda División

- Basketmar Coruña

Wild Cards

- CB Cáceres
- Unicaja Melilla
- CAB Obradoiro

Teams that resigned to participate

- CD Cajamadrid transfers its rights to Juventud Alcalá.
- CAB Cartagena was replaced by Lotus Santa Coloma, who obtained a relegation place the previous season.

=== Venues and locations ===
Location of teams in 1991–92 1ªDivisión
Location of teams from the Canary Islands in 1991–92 1ªDivisión

| Team | Home city |
|---|---|
| Basketmar Coruña | La Coruña |
| CAB Obradoiro | Santiago de Compostela |
| Caja Badajoz | Badajoz |
| Caja Bilbao | Bilbao |
| CB Askatuak | San Sebastián |
| CB Cáceres | Cáceres |
| CB Canarias | San Cristóbal de la Laguna |
| CB Guadalajara | Guadalajara |
| Cirsa Hospitalet | Hospitalet de Llobregat |
| ElMonte Huelva | Huelva |
| Festina Andorra | Andorra la Vella |
| Juventud Alcalá | Alcalá de Henares |
| Lagisa Gijón | Gijón |
| Lotus Santa Coloma | Santa Coloma de Gramenet |
| Prohaci Mallorca | Palma de Mallorca |
| Unicaja Melilla | Melilla |

== Regular season ==
| Pos | Team | Pld | W | L | PF | PA | PD | Pts | Qualification or relegation |
|---|---|---|---|---|---|---|---|---|---|
| 1 | Festina Andorra | 30 | 21 | 9 | 2506 | 2334 | +172 | 51 | Qualification to A1 |
| 2 | Prohaci Mallorca | 30 | 21 | 9 | 2456 | 2272 | +184 | 51 | Qualification to A2 |
| 3 | CB Cáceres | 30 | 18 | 12 | 2378 | 2251 | +127 | 48 | Qualification to A2 |
| 4 | ElMonte Huelva | 30 | 17 | 13 | 2396 | 2309 | +87 | 47 | Qualification to A1 |
| 5 | Lagisa Gijón | 30 | 17 | 13 | 2494 | 2508 | −14 | 47 | Qualification to A1 |
| 6 | CB Canarias | 30 | 16 | 14 | 2474 | 2334 | +140 | 46 | Qualification to A2 |
| 7 | Caja Badajoz | 30 | 16 | 14 | 2388 | 2342 | +46 | 46 | Qualification to A2 |
| 8 | Basketmar Coruña | 30 | 16 | 14 | 2420 | 2390 | +30 | 46 | Qualification to A1 |
| 9 | Caja Bilbao | 30 | 16 | 14 | 2496 | 2551 | −55 | 46 | Qualification to B1 |
| 10 | Juventud Alcalá | 30 | 15 | 15 | 2456 | 2438 | +18 | 45 | Qualification to B2 |
| 11 | CB Guadalajara | 30 | 15 | 15 | 2281 | 2326 | −45 | 45 | Qualification to B2 |
| 12 | CB Askatuak | 30 | 13 | 17 | 2451 | 2435 | +16 | 43 | Qualification to B1 |
| 13 | CAB Obradoiro | 30 | 12 | 18 | 2286 | 2370 | −84 | 42 | Qualification to B1 |
| 14 | Lotus Santa Coloma | 30 | 10 | 20 | 2187 | 2288 | −101 | 40 | Qualification to B2 |
| 15 | CB Hospitalet | 30 | 10 | 20 | 2269 | 2415 | −146 | 40 | Qualification to B2 |
| 16 | Unicaja Melilla | 30 | 7 | 23 | 2162 | 2437 | −275 | 37 | Qualification to B1 |

Source: League at JM Almenzar website

== Second phase ==
=== Group A1 ===
| Pos | Team | Pld | W | L | PF | PA | PD | Pts | Qualification or relegation |
|---|---|---|---|---|---|---|---|---|---|
| 1 | Festina Andorra | 6 | 5 | 1 | 506 | 436 | +70 | 11 | Qualification to Champions playoff |
| 2 | ElMonte Huelva | 6 | 3 | 3 | 511 | 476 | +35 | 9 | Qualification to Promotion Playoffs |
| 3 | Lagisa Gijón | 6 | 3 | 3 | 443 | 487 | −44 | 9 | Qualification to Promotion Playoffs |
| 4 | Basketmar Coruña | 6 | 1 | 5 | 447 | 508 | −61 | 7 | Qualification to Promotion Playoffs |

Source: League at JM Almenzar website

=== Group A2 ===
| Pos | Team | Pld | W | L | PF | PA | PD | Pts | Qualification or relegation |
|---|---|---|---|---|---|---|---|---|---|
| 1 | CB Cáceres | 6 | 4 | 2 | 473 | 426 | +47 | 10 | Qualification to Champions playoff |
| 2 | Caja Badajoz | 6 | 3 | 3 | 449 | 444 | +5 | 9 | Qualification to Promotion Playoffs |
| 3 | CB Canarias | 6 | 3 | 3 | 448 | 470 | −22 | 9 | Qualification to Promotion Playoffs |
| 4 | Prohaci Mallorca | 6 | 2 | 4 | 419 | 449 | −30 | 8 | Qualification to Promotion Playoffs |

Source: League at JM Almenzar website

=== Group B1 ===
| Pos | Team | Pld | W | L | PF | PA | PD | Pts | Qualification or relegation |
|---|---|---|---|---|---|---|---|---|---|
| 1 | Caja Bilbao | 6 | 5 | 1 | 524 | 499 | +25 | 11 | |
| 2 | CB Askatuak | 6 | 3 | 3 | 543 | 531 | +12 | 9 | Qualification to Relegation |
| 3 | Unicaja Melilla | 6 | 3 | 3 | 549 | 545 | +4 | 9 | Qualification to Relegation |
| 4 | CAB Obradoiro | 6 | 1 | 5 | 487 | 508 | −21 | 7 | Relegation to Segunda División |

Source: League at JM Almenzar website

=== Group B2 ===
| Pos | Team | Pld | W | L | PF | PA | PD | Pts | Qualification or relegation |
|---|---|---|---|---|---|---|---|---|---|
| 1 | CB Guadalajara | 6 | 5 | 1 | 455 | 431 | +24 | 11 | |
| 2 | Juventud Alcalá | 6 | 4 | 2 | 453 | 414 | +39 | 10 | Qualification to Relegation |
| 3 | Lotus Santa Coloma | 6 | 2 | 4 | 455 | 455 | 0 | 8 | Qualification to Relegation |
| 4 | CB Hospitalet | 6 | 1 | 5 | 425 | 488 | −63 | 7 | Relegation to Segunda División |

Source: League at JM Almenzar website

== PlayOffs ==
=== Champions playoff ===
The winner is promoted to Liga ACB.

| Finals |
| A1-1 Festina Andorra | 84 | 77 | 82 | 85 | 73 |
| A2-1 CB Cáceres | 85 | 69 | 80 | 87 | 71 |

=== Promotion playoffs ===
The winner is promoted to Liga ACB.

Quarterfinals
A1-3 Lagisa Gijón | 77 | 81 | 62 | 74 | 71
A2-3 CB Canarias | 79 | 80 | 73 | 65 | 73
A1-2 Prohaci Mallorca | 72 | 64 | 55 | 70 | 95
A2-4 ElMonte Huelva | 79 | 59 | 75 | 67 | 78
A2-2 Caja Badajoz | 78 | 91 | 94 | 91
A1-4 Basketmar Coruña | 88 | 77 | 92 | 79

Semifinals
A2-1 CB Cáceres | 72 | 82 | 95
A2-3 CB Canarias | 63 | 79 | 73
A1-2 Prohaci Mallorca | 81 | 81 | 88
A2-2 Caja Badajoz | 66 | 73 | 79

Finals
A1-2 Prohaci Mallorca | 93 | 67 | 78 | 79
A2-1 CB Cáceres | 82 | 73 | 91 | 80

=== Relegation playoffs ===
| Team 1 | Series | Team 2 | Game 1 | Game 2 | Game 3 | Game 4 | Game 5 |
|---|---|---|---|---|---|---|---|
| CB Askatuak | 3–0 | Lotus Santa Coloma | 101–73 | 95–78 | 89–88 | | |
| Juventud Alcalá | 3–1 | Unicaja Melilla | 78–82 | 101–87 | 101–93 | 88–81 | |

== Final standings ==
| Pos | Team | Pld | W | L | Qualification or relegation |
|---|---|---|---|---|---|
| 1 | Festina Andorra (P) | 41 | 29 | 12 | Promoted to ACB |
| 2 | CB Cáceres (P) | 48 | 30 | 18 | Promoted to ACB |
| 3 | Prohaci Mallorca | 48 | 30 | 18 | |
| 4 | CB Canarias | 44 | 22 | 22 | |
| 5 | Caja Badajoz | 43 | 22 | 21 | |
| 6 | ElMonte Huelva | 41 | 22 | 19 | |
| 7 | Lagisa Gijón | 41 | 22 | 19 | |
| 8 | Basketmar Coruña | 40 | 18 | 22 | |
| 9 | Caja Bilbao | 36 | 21 | 15 | |
| 10 | CB Guadalajara | 36 | 20 | 16 | |
| 11 | Juventud Alcalá | 40 | 22 | 18 | |
| 12 | CB Askatuak | 39 | 19 | 20 | |
| 13 | Lotus Santa Coloma (R) | 39 | 12 | 27 | Relegation to Segunda División |
| 14 | Unicaja Melilla | 40 | 11 | 29 | Relegation to Segunda División |
| 15 | CAB Obradoiro (R) | 36 | 13 | 23 | Relegation to Segunda División |
| 16 | CB Hospitalet (R) | 36 | 11 | 25 | Relegation to Segunda División |

Source: hispaligas.net
(P) Promoted; (R) Relegated
