= Torneo Comunidad de Madrid =

Basketball competition

The Torneo de la Comunidad de Madrid or Torneo de la CAM (English: Community of Madrid Tournament) was a basketball competition played every preseason between the Spanish ACB teams from the Community of Madrid organized by the Federación de Baloncesto de Madrid (FBM) until it was folded in 2014.

Real Madrid is the team with the most tournament titles won, and was the winner of the last ten editions of the tournament. Only Real, Estudiantes, and Fuenlabrada won any of the tournament titles. Collado Villalba and Cajamadrid, also participated at the tournament.

== History ==
Year	Host	Champion	Runner-up	Score
1984	Collado Villalba	Real Madrid	Estudiantes	101–72
1985	San Sebastián de los Reyes	Real Madrid	Estudiantes	101–79
1986	Madrid	Real Madrid	Estudiantes	95–92
1987	Madrid	Real Madrid	Estudiantes	102–87
1988	Madrid	Estudiantes	Real Madrid	82–78
1989	Madrid	Real Madrid	Estudiantes	RM 96–85 EST; RM 93–65 CV; EST 111–83 CV
1990	Madrid	Estudiantes	Collado Villalba	EST 86–82 CV; CV 77–61 RM; RM 68–92 EST
1991	Madrid	Real Madrid	Estudiantes	RM 80–76 EST; RM 101–95 CV; EST 95–68 CV
1992	Madrid	Estudiantes	Real Madrid	EST 65–76 RM; RM 68–54 EST
1993	Madrid	Estudiantes	Real Madrid	78–69
1994	Madrid	Real Madrid	Estudiantes	EST 79–81 RM; RM 100–91 EST
1995	Madrid	Real Madrid	Estudiantes	100–92
1996	Madrid	Estudiantes	Real Madrid	RM 51–30 FUE; EST 40–27 FUE; EST 48–44 RM
1997	Madrid	Real Madrid	Estudiantes	87–75
1998	Torrejón de Ardoz	Fuenlabrada	Real Madrid	FUE 91–80 RM; EST 88–87 FUE; RM 79–73 EST
1999	Torrejón de Ardoz	Estudiantes	Real Madrid	EST 77–69 RM; EST 90–74 FUE; FUE 75–91 RM
2000	Torrejón de Ardoz	Real Madrid	Fuenlabrada	RM 90–69 FUE; FUE 76–75 EST; RM 93–89 EST
2001	Arganda del Rey	Estudiantes	Real Madrid	EST 97–96 FUE; FUE 49–93 RM; EST 95–82 RM
2002	Arganda del Rey	Estudiantes	Fuenlabrada	EST 80–73 FUE; FUE 68–67 RM; EST 83–72 RM

Year	Host	Champion	Runner-up	Score
2003	Torrejón de Ardoz	Estudiantes	Real Madrid	RM 84–82 FUE; EST 108–89 FUE; EST 90–74 RM
2004	Torrejón de Ardoz	Real Madrid	Estudiantes	81–69
2005	Pinto	Real Madrid	Fuenlabrada	EST 77–76 FUE; FUE 70–67 RM; RM 92–70 EST
2006	Pinto	Real Madrid	Fuenlabrada	RM 78–61 FUE; FUE 67–54 EST; RM 69–57 EST
2007	Alcobendas	Real Madrid	Fuenlabrada	EST 72–76 FUE; FUE 62–71 RM; RM 70–60 EST
2008	Alcobendas	Real Madrid	Estudiantes	EST 75–59 FUE; FUE 69–63 RM; RM 75–59 EST
2009	Alcobendas	Real Madrid	Fuenlabrada	RM 65–59 FUE; EST 75–79 FUE; RM 78–70 EST
2010	Fuenlabrada; Madrid	Real Madrid	Fuenlabrada	FUE 78–76 EST; FUE 81–85 RM; EST 79–84 RM
2011	Leganés	Real Madrid	Estudiantes	FUE 62–81 RM; EST 70–68 FUE; RM 79–68 EST
2012	Leganés	Real Madrid	Estudiantes	71–60
2013	Leganés	Real Madrid	Estudiantes	86–69

== Performance by club ==
Club	Titles	Runners-up	Winning years
Real Madrid	20	8	1984, 1985, 1986, 1987, 1989, 1991, 1994, 1995, 1997, 2000, 2004, 2005, 2006, 2007, 2008, 2009, 2010, 2011, 2012, 2013
Estudiantes	9	14	1988, 1990, 1992, 1993, 1996, 1999, 2001, 2002, 2003
Fuenlabrada	1	7	1998
Collado Villalba	0	1	

== See also ==
- Madrid basketball derby
