= CD Oximesa =

Former Spanish basketball club

Club Deportivo Oximesa
- Founded: 1979
- Dissolved: 1993
- Arena: Municipal José Antonio Murado
- Location: Albolote, Andalusia (1979–1992); Granada, Andalusia (1992–1993)
- Team colors: Blue and white

Club Deportivo Oximesa was a professional basketball club based in Albolote, Spain.

== History ==
CD Oximesa was founded in 1979 and started playing in the Provincial League, promoting in its first year to Tercera División (Spanish fourth tier). In 1983 promotes to Primera División B, second tier, and in 1986 promotes to Liga ACB, where it plays until the relegation in 1992. In this year, the team is moved to Granada and renamed as Baloncesto Granada. After the 1992–93 season in Primera B, the team is dissolved.

== Sponsorship naming ==
- Oximesa Granada 1979–1988
- Puleva Granada 1988–1992
- Ciudad de Granada 1992–1993

== Season by season ==
Season	Tier	Division	Pos.	W–L	Copa del Rey	Other cups	
1979–80	5	Provincial					
1980–81	4	3ª División					
1981–82	3	2ª División					
1982–83	3	2ª División	2nd				
1983–84	2	1ª División B	4th	15–11			
1984–85	2	1ª División B	6th	14–12			
1985–86	2	1ª División B	3rd	23–9			
1986–87	1	Liga ACB	11th	13–18		Copa Príncipe	SF
1987–88	1	Liga ACB	11th	15–16		Copa Príncipe	R16
1988–89	1	Liga ACB	14th	17–24	Round of 16		
1989–90	1	Liga ACB	20th	16–24	First round		
1990–91	1	Liga ACB	22nd	12–30	First round		
1991–92	1	Liga ACB	24th	9–31	Second round		
1992–93	2	1ª División	7th	21–19			

== Notable players ==
- (United States) Dallas Comegys
- (United States) Joe Cooper
- (United States) Jeff Lamp
- (United States) Jerome Lane
- (United States) Dave Popson
- (Socialist Federal Republic of Yugoslavia) Goran Grbović
- (Socialist Federal Republic of Yugoslavia) Milenko Savović

== Notable coaches ==
- (Socialist Federal Republic of Yugoslavia) Duško Vujošević
