= Tenerife AB =

- Nickname: Tenerife Nº1
- Founded: 1986
- Dissolved: 1994
- Arena: Pabellón Municipal de Santa Cruz (capacity: 4,000)
- Location: Santa Cruz de Tenerife, Canary Islands
- Team colors: White and navy
Home	Away

Tenerife Amigos del Baloncesto, more commonly known by its sponsorship name Tenerife Nº1 was a professional basketball club based in Santa Cruz de Tenerife, Spain.

== History ==
Tenerife AB was founded on 1986 with the aim to professionalize the basketball section of the classic team RC Náutico de Tenerife. In the 1987–88 season, the club promoted to Liga ACB where it played two seasons until its relegation.

The club was folded in 1994 when it merged with the old CB Canarias to create the CB Tenerife Canarias, which it only played two seasons in the new-creation Liga EBA.

== Season by season ==
Season	Tier	Division	Pos.	W–L	Copa del Rey
1986–87	2	1ª División B	13th	17–17	
1987–88	2	1ª División B	6th	27–16	
1988–89	1	Liga ACB	22nd	15–29	First round
1989–90	1	Liga ACB	24th	13–32	First round
1990–91	2	1ª División	13th	17–26	
1991–92	3	2ª División			
1992–93	2	1ª División	30th (Note: Remained in the league after achieving a vacant berth.)	9–21	
1993–94	2	1ª División	19th	21–9	

== Notable players ==
- (United States) Tony Dawson
- (United States) Lemone Lampley
- (United States) Bobby Lee Hurt
