= CB Cajabilbao =

Basketball team in Bilbao, Spain

Club Baloncesto Caja Bilbao
- Founded: 1983
- Dissolved: 1994
- Arena: La Casilla
- Location: Bilbao, Basque Country
- Team colors: Navyblue and white

Club Baloncesto Caja Bilbao was a professional basketball club based in Bilbao, Spain.

== History ==
Caja Bilbao was founded in 1983 and promoted to Liga ACB in 1987, where it remained during five years.

It was dissolved in 1994 after promoting again to Liga ACB, but had not enough supporting to play the league.

== Season by season ==
Season	Tier	Division	Pos.	W–L	Copa del Rey	Other cups	
1984–85	2	1ª División B	4th	17–9			
1985–86	2	1ª División B	2nd	20–8			
1986–87	1	Liga ACB	9th	13–18	Semifinalist	Copa Príncipe	QF
1987–88	1	Liga ACB	12th	15–15		Copa Príncipe	R16
1988–89	1	Liga ACB	11th	17–24	Round of 16		
1989–90	1	Liga ACB	15th	16–13	Round of 16		
1990–91	1	Liga ACB	23rd	15–28	First round		
1991–92	2	1ª División	9th	21–15			
1992–93	2	1ª División	3rd	32–12			
1993–94	2	1ª División	1st	37–13			

== Notable players ==
- (Spain) Juan Manuel López Iturriaga
- (United States) Joe Kopicki
- (United States) Darrell Lockhart
