= CB Granollers =

- Leagues: Copa Catalunya
- Founded: 1932
- History: CB Granollers (1930–1989); Granollers EB (1989–1991); CB Granollers (1991–present)
- Arena: Pavelló CB Granollers (capacity: 3,200)
- Location: Granollers, Catalonia, Spain
- Team colors: White and Navy blue
- President: Joan Nadal Castells
- Website: www.cbgranollers.com
Home	Away

Club Bàsquet Granollers is a professional basketball team based in Granollers, Catalonia, Spain, which currently plays in Liga EBA.

== History ==
It was one of the historic teams of Liga Nacional and Liga ACB, where he played from 1977 to 1993, when it resigned to their place due to financial problems. In the 1985–86 season, the club played the Korać Cup.

In 1991 it changed its name to Granollers Esportiu Bàsquet after a merge with RCD Espanyol and played with it until 1993. After that, the professional club was dissolved and continued as Club Bàsquet Granollers.

== Sponsorship naming ==
- Areslux Granollers 1977–1984
- Cacaolat Granollers 1984–1989
- Grupo IFA Granollers 1989–1991
- BFI Granollers 1992–1993

== Season by season ==
Season	Tier	Division	Pos.	W–L	Copa del Rey	Other cups		European competitions		
Granollers EB
1970–71	3	3ª División	8th	14–1–11						
1971–72	3	3ª División	2nd	23–8						
1972–73	2	2ª División	5th	18–10						
1973–74	2	2ª División		–						
1974–75	2	2ª División	1st	21–7						
1975–76	2	2ª División	6th	13–1–10						
1976–77	2	2ª División	2nd	19–1–8						
1977–78	1	1ª División	9th	7–1–14	Group stage					
1978–79	1	1ª División	6th	11–11	Quarterfinalist			3 Korać Cup	R2	2–2
1979–80	1	1ª División	5th	9–3–10	Round of 16					
1980–81	1	1ª División	10th	9–1–16	Round of 16					
1981–82	1	1ª División	9th	11–1–4	Quarterfinalist					
1982–83	1	1ª División	3rd	17–2–7	Quarterfinalist					
1983–84	1	Liga ACB	6th	19–12						
1984–85	1	Liga ACB	5th	12–19		Copa Príncipe	SF			
1985–86	1	Liga ACB	8th	11–21		Copa Príncipe	RU	3 Korać Cup	GS	4–6
1986–87	1	Liga ACB	7th	13–20	Quarterfinalist	Copa Príncipe	QF			
1987–88	1	Liga ACB	7th	17–13		Copa Príncipe	QF			
1988–89	1	Liga ACB	8th	18–20	First round					
1989–90	1	Liga ACB	8th	21–17	Semifinalist					
1990–91	1	Liga ACB	19th	18–24	Third round					
1991–92	1	Liga ACB	12th	20–20	Third round					
1992–93	1	Liga ACB	14th (Note: The professional team of the club was dissolved at the end of the season.)	13–20	Third round					
Granollers EB
1999–00	3	Liga EBA	16th	3–27						
2000–01	5	Copa Catalunya	8th	17–13						
2001–02	5	Copa Catalunya	1st	30–2						
2002–03	4	Liga EBA	15th	7–23						
2003–04	4	Liga EBA	13th	12–18						
2004–05	4	Liga EBA	10th	14–16						
2005–06	4	Liga EBA	3rd	22–12						
2006–07	4	Liga EBA	8th	14–12						
2007–08	5	Liga EBA	6th	19–11						
2008–09	5	Liga EBA	9th	16–14						
2009–10	4	Liga EBA	2nd	17–9						
2010–11	4	Liga EBA	8th	16–14						
2011–12	4	Liga EBA	15th (Note: Remained in the league after achieving a vacant place.)	6–22						
2012–13	4	Liga EBA	12th (Note: Resigned to continue playing in Liga EBA.)	13–17						
2013–14	6	1ª Catalana	1st	24–9						
2014–15	5	Copa Catalunya	12th (Note: Remained in the league after achieving a vacant place.)	12–20						
2015–16	5	Copa Catalunya	9th	15–15						
2016–17	5	Copa Catalunya	7th	12–14						
2017–18	5	Copa Catalunya	7th	11–15						
