= CB Collado Villalba =

Club Baloncesto Collado Villalba
- Founded: 1922
- Dissolved: 1993
- History: CB Collado Villalba (1922–1990); CB Atlético Madrid-Villalba (1990–1991); CB Collado Villalba (1991–1993)
- Arena: Pabellón Municipal de Villalba (capacity: 3,500)
- Location: Collado Villalba, Community of Madrid
- Team colors: Green and white
Home	Away

Club Baloncesto Collado Villalba was a professional basketball club based in Collado Villalba, Spain.

== History ==
CB Collado Villalba was founded in 1922. During its first years in Liga ACB, the club had the sponsorship of the actual BBVA bank, in that years known as Bancobao and later as BBV. In the 1990–91 ACB season, Jesús Gil acquires the team and converts it in the basketball section of Atlético de Madrid, but it ceased the next season.

After the 1991–92 ACB season, where the team avoided the relegation to Primera B, CB Collado Villalba was dissolved due to its financial trouble.

== Season by season ==
Season	Tier	Division	Pos.	W–L	Copa del Rey	Other cups		European competitions		
1983–84	2	1ª División B	3rd	17–9						
1984–85	1	Liga ACB	16th	4–26						
1985–86	2	1ª División B	8th	12–16						
1986–87	2	1ª División B	2nd	21–13						
1987–88	1	Liga ACB	13th	10–22		Copa Príncipe	R16			
1988–89	1	Liga ACB	12th	27–14	Round of 16					
1989–90	1	Liga ACB	11th	19–21	First round					
1990–91	1	Liga ACB	8th	19–19	First round					
1991–92	1	Liga ACB	22nd	11–28	Third round			3 Korać Cup	R32	2–2
1992–93	2	1ª División	23rd	18–18						

== Notable players ==
- (Spain) Juan Antonio Orenga
- (Spain) David Brabender
- (United States) Walter Berry
- (United States) Mark Landsberger
- (United States) Rory White
- (United States) Lance Berwald
- (United States) Henry Turner
- (United States) Tod Murphy
- (United States) Winfred King
