= 1987 Copa del Rey de Baloncesto =

The 1987 Copa del Rey was the 51st edition of the Spanish basketball Cup. It was organized by the ACB and its Final Eight was played in Santa Cruz de Tenerife, in the Palacio Municipal de Deportes between 13 and 15 December 1986.

This edition was played by the four first qualified of the 1986–87 ACB first stage, and was the first one played with a Final Eight format.

== Qualified teams ==
Group Odd

Team	Pld	W	L	PF	PA	PD	Pts
Real Madrid	14	12	2	1337	1151	+186	26
Ron Negrita Joventut	14	12	2	1295	1190	+105	26
Estudiantes Caja Postal	14	7	7	1310	1275	+35	21
Cajabilbao	14	7	7	1214	1247	−33	21

Group Even

Team	Pld	W	L	PF	PA	PD	Pts
FC Barcelona	14	12	2	1394	1153	+241	26
CAI Zaragoza	14	11	3	1322	1173	+149	25
Cajacanarias	14	9	5	1316	1265	+51	23
Cacaolat Granollers	14	8	6	1225	1249	−24	22

== Bracket ==
Quarterfinals; 13 December
FC Barcelona	104
Cacaolat Granollers	90
CAI Zaragoza	103
Estudiantes Caja Postal	87
Ron Negrita Joventut	97
Cajacanarias	92
Cajabilbao	89
Real Madrid	84

Semifinals; 14 December
FC Barcelona	117
CAI Zaragoza	88
Cajabilbao	91
Ron Negrita Joventut	102

Final; 15 December
FC Barcelona	110
Ron Negrita Joventut	102

== Final ==
15 December 1986
18:45 GTM+1

Boxscore

FC Barcelona	110–102	Ron Negrita Joventut
Scoring by half: 54–58, 56–44
Pts: Bryant 29; Rebs: Bryant 8 Asts: Solozábal 2 PIR: Bryant 33		Pts: Villacampa 26; Rebs: Johnson 10; Asts: Villacampa 3 PIR: Johnson 29

Palacio Municipal de Santa Cruz, Santa Cruz de Tenerife
Attendance: 5,000
Referees: Juan José Neyro, Jesús León Arencibia

1987 Copa del Rey Champions

FC Barcelona
14th title
