= Real Betis Baloncesto =

Real Betis
- Nickname: Béticos; Los Verdiblancos
- Founded: 1987; 39 years ago
- Dissolved: 2025; 1 year ago
- History: Club Deportivo Baloncesto Sevilla (1987–2018); Real Betis Baloncesto (2018–2025)
- Arena: San Pablo
- Capacity: 7,626
- Location: Seville, Spain
- Team colors: Green, White
- Championships: 1 LEB Oro; 1 Copa Princesa
- Retired numbers: 1 (9)
- Website: realbetisbaloncesto.com
Home	Away

Real Betis Baloncesto S.A.D., simply known as Real Betis, was a professional basketball team based in Seville, Spain. The team last played in the Primera FEB, the second basketball division of the Spanish basketball league system after the Liga ACB. It played its home games at San Pablo.

== History ==
Club Deportivo Baloncesto Sevilla was founded in 1987 when the team bought the seat of Dribling de Madrid in the second division, in that time called Primera División B. In 1989, the team promoted to Liga ACB for the first time ever.

In 1996 and 1999 the club finished the league as runner-up being defeated both times in the finals 0–3 by FC Barcelona.

In 2011, Sevilla lost the 2010–11 Eurocup final, played in Treviso, Italy, against Unics Kazan.

On 21 July 2016, Baloncesto Sevilla and Real Betis agreed a collaboration agreement for helping the football squad to solve the financial problems of the basketball team. The team would be called Real Betis Energía Plus as a result of the agreement and a new sponsor. On 31 December 2016, Real Betis agreed the buy of the 99.99% of the shares of the club and implemented it on 12 January 2017.

In 2017 the club relegated from Liga ACB for the first time in its history, but remained in the league in application of the precautionary measures issued by the judicial demand of the Andalusian club after the change of the requirements to join the ACB during the pre-season. However, the club was relegated again in the next season after a very poor performance with only seven wins in 34 matches, finishing in the last position of the league table.

On 6 September 2018, the club unanimously approved to take the necessary steps to obtain the pertinent authorization from the Spanish royal house to change its name to Real Betis Baloncesto S.A.D. This change was finally approved on 15 December 2018.

During the 2018–19 season, their first ever in LEB Oro, Real Betis beat the record of biggest winning streak with 17, thus meaning they beat all their league opponents consecutively. The club quickly came back to the top tier after winning the championship with four rounds left.

== Sponsorship naming ==
From 1987 to 2014, the club was sponsored by Caja San Fernando, renamed in 2007 as Cajasol and merged in Banca Cívica years later.

- Caja San Fernando (1987–2007)
- Cajasol (2007–10)
- Cajasol Banca Cívica (2010–2011)
- Banca Cívica (2011–2012)
- Cajasol (2012–2014)
- Baloncesto Sevilla (2014–2016)
- Real Betis Energía Plus (2016–2019)
- Coosur Real Betis (2019–2022)
- Real Betis Baloncesto (2022–2025)

== Logos ==
2016–2019

== Players ==
=== Retired numbers ===
Real Betis Baloncesto retired numbers
No.	Nat.	Player	Position	Tenure
9	(Spain)	Raúl Pérez	F	1989–1997, 2002–2006

=== Notable players ===
- (Spain) Nacho Azofra
- (Spain) Willy Hernangómez
- (Spain) Raúl Pérez
- (Spain) Joan Sastre
- (Spain) - (United States) Mike Smith
- (Spain) - (United States) Chuck Kornegay
- (Argentina) Hernán Jasen
- (Australia) Chris Anstey
- (Australia) Martin Cattalini
- (Canada) Carl English
- (Czech Republic) Ondřej Balvín
- (Czech Republic) Tomáš Satoranský
- (United Kingdom) Darren Phillip
- (Georgia (country)) - (United States) Tyrone Ellis
- (Georgia (country)) Beka Burjanadze
- (Germany) Patrick Femerling
- (Greece) Michalis Kakiouzis
- (Greece) Georgios Tsalmpouris
- (Israel) (Trinidad and Tobago) (United States) Khadeen Carrington
- (Latvia) Kristaps Porziņģis
- (Lithuania) Donatas Slanina
- (Lithuania) Mindaugas Katelynas
- (Netherlands) Francisco Elson
- (Poland) Michał Ignerski
- (Serbia) Duško Savanović
- (Turkey) - (Kosovo) Kenan Sipahi
- (Puerto Rico) (United States) John Holland
- (Dominican Republic) (United States) James Feldeine
- (United States) Maurice Ager
- (United States) Michael Anderson
- (United States) Louis Bullock
- (United States) Earl Calloway
- (United States) Paul Davis
- (United States) Erick Green
- (United States) Tariq Kirksay
- (United States) Donnie McGrath
- (United States) Darryl Middleton
- (United States) Andy Panko
- (United States) Hollis Price
- (United States) Lou Roe
- (United States) Clay Tucker
- (United States) Andre Turner
- (United States) / (North Macedonia) Jacob Wiley

== Head coaches ==
- José Alberto Pesquera : 1990–1995, 1998
- Aleksandar Petrović : 1995–1997
- Salva Maldonado : 1997–1998
- Javier Imbroda : 1998–2001
- Javier Fijo : 2001, 2005
- Marco Crespi : 2001–2002
- Gustavo Aranzana : 2002–2004
- Velimir Perasović : 2004–2005
- Óscar Quintana : 2005
- Manel Comas : 2005–2007, 2008
- Moncho López : 2007
- Rubén Magnano : 2007–2008
- Ángel Jareño : 2008
- Pedro Martínez : 2008–2009
- Joan Plaza : 2009–2012, 2020–2021
- Aíto García Reneses : 2012–2014
- Scott Roth : 2014–2015
- Luis Casimiro : 2015–2016, 2021–2023
- Žan Tabak : 2016–2017
- Alejandro Martínez : 2017
- Óscar Quintana : 2017–2018
- Javier Carrasco : 2018, 2023
- Curro Segura : 2018–2020
- Bruno Savignani : 2023–2024
- Gonzalo García de Vitoria : 2024–2025

== Season by season ==
Season	Tier	Division	Pos.	W–L	Copa del Rey	Other cups		European competitions		
1987–88	2	1ª División B	10th	20–21						
1988–89	2	1ª División	2nd	22–14						
1989–90	1	Liga ACB	12th	17–23	Round of 16					
1990–91	1	Liga ACB	12th	18–22	Third round					
1991–92	1	Liga ACB	19th	17–21	First round					
1992–93	1	Liga ACB	5th	22–14	Quarterfinalist					
1993–94	1	Liga ACB	6th	17–17	Third round			3 Korać Cup	GS	4–6
1994–95	1	Liga ACB	10th	19–19	Second round			3 Korać Cup	GS	6–4
1995–96	1	Liga ACB	2nd	27–21	Quarterfinalist					
1996–97	1	Liga ACB	9th	19–15	Quarterfinalist			1 Euroleague	R16	7–11
1997–98	1	Liga ACB	13th	13–21						
1998–99	1	Liga ACB	2nd	31–15	Runner-up					
1999–00	1	Liga ACB	5th	23–15	Semifinalist			1 Euroleague	GS	6–10
2000–01	1	Liga ACB	12th	13–21				2 Saporta Cup	R16	5–7
2001–02	1	Liga ACB	12th	14–20	Quarterfinalist					
2002–03	1	Liga ACB	12th	16–18						
2003–04	1	Liga ACB	12th	15–19	Semifinalist					
2004–05	1	Liga ACB	10th	14–20						
2005–06	1	Liga ACB	11th	14–20						
2006–07	1	Liga ACB	13th	14–20	Quarterfinalist					
2007–08	1	Liga ACB	10th	14–20						
2008–09	1	Liga ACB	14th	10–22				2 Eurocup	QR2	0–2
2008–09	1	Liga ACB	14th	10–22				3 EuroChallenge	L16	5–7
2009–10	1	Liga ACB	6th	20–17	Quarterfinalist					
2010–11	1	Liga ACB	11th	16–18				2 Eurocup	RU	10–6
2011–12	1	Liga ACB	7th	18–18	Semifinalist					
2012–13	1	Liga ACB	15th	12–22				2 Eurocup	L16	4–8
2013–14	1	Liga ACB	7th	19–18						
2014–15	1	Liga ACB	15th	12–22				2 Eurocup	L32	7–9
2015–16	1	Liga ACB	11th	14–20						
2016–17	1	Liga ACB	16th (Note: Could remain in ACB due to a precautionary statement to their judicial demand.)	9–23						
2017–18	1	Liga ACB	18th	7–27						
2018–19	2	LEB Oro	1st	30–4		Copa Princesa	C			
2019–20	1	Liga ACB	15th (Note: League ended prematurely due to the coronavirus pandemic.)	8–15						
2020–21	1	Liga ACB	16th	11–25						
2021–22	1	Liga ACB	13th	13–21						
2022–23	1	Liga ACB	17th	10–24		Supercopa	SF			
2023–24	2	Primera FEB	9th	19–20						
2024–25	2	Primera FEB	2nd	31–10		Spain Cup	SF			

== Records and awards ==
=== Records ===
- 33 seasons in ACB
- 5 seasons in the second tier:
  - 2 in Primera División B
  - 1 in LEB Oro
  - 2 in Primera FEB

=== Trophies ===
- LEB Oro: (1)
  - 2018–19
- Copa Princesa de Asturias: (1)
  - 2019
- Andalusia Cup: (5)
  - 1998, 1999, 2002, 2005, 2009

=== Individual awards ===
ACB Most Valuable Player

- Michael Anderson – 1996

ACB Three Point Shootout Champion

- Raúl Pérez – 2003

ACB Slam Dunk Champion

- Tomáš Satoranský – 2010

EuroCup Rising Star Award

- Kristaps Porziņģis – 2015

All-EuroCup First Team

- Tariq Kirksay – 2011

All-EuroCup Second Team

- Paul Davis – 2011
