= 1990–91 ACB season =

1990-91 ACB season
- League: Liga ACB
- Sport: Basketball
- Duration: September 19, 1990 - May 30, 1990
- Teams: 24
- TV partner: Televisión Española

Regular Season
- Season champions: Montigalà Joventut

Playoffs

ACB Finals
- Champions: Montigalà Joventut
- Finals MVP: (United States) Corny Thompson

ACB seasons
- ← 1989–90 1991–92 →

The 1990–91 ACB season was the 8th season of the Liga ACB, after changing its name. The competition format changed again. The 24 teams were divided in two groups of 12 teams each. The eight first teams of each group advanced to the championship playoffs, and the four last teams of each group advanced to the relegation playoffs.

Montigalà Joventut won their first ACB title, and their 3rd overall. It was the first ACB title won by a team besides FC Barcelona and Real Madrid.

== Team Standings ==
=== Regular season ===
| Advanced to Championship Playoffs |
| Advanced to Relegation Playoffs |

==== Group Even ====
| Team | Pld | W | L | PF | PA |
|---|---|---|---|---|---|
| Montigalà Joventut | 34 | 30 | 4 | 3091 | 2550 |
| Estudiantes Caja Postal | 34 | 25 | 9 | 2862 | 2637 |
| CAI Zaragoza | 34 | 20 | 14 | 3135 | 2929 |
| Fórum Valladolid | 34 | 20 | 14 | 2722 | 2695 |
| Valvi Girona | 34 | 18 | 16 | 2695 | 2668 |
| Mayoral Maristas | 34 | 16 | 18 | 2665 | 2664 |
| Caja San Fernando | 34 | 15 | 19 | 2759 | 2812 |
| Caixa Ourense | 34 | 15 | 19 | 2749 | 2984 |
| Grupo IFA | 34 | 14 | 20 | 2712 | 2819 |
| Elosúa León | 34 | 13 | 21 | 2854 | 2846 |
| Cajacanarias | 34 | 10 | 24 | 2820 | 3055 |
| Puleva Baloncesto Granada | 34 | 9 | 25 | 2534 | 2899 |

==== Group Odd ====
| Team | Pld | W | L | PF | PA |
|---|---|---|---|---|---|
| FC Barcelona | 34 | 26 | 8 | 2822 | 2443 |
| Real Madrid Otaysa | 34 | 24 | 10 | 2745 | 2575 |
| Taugrés | 34 | 21 | 13 | 2796 | 2669 |
| Atlético Madrid Villalba | 34 | 17 | 17 | 2648 | 2744 |
| Huesca La Magia | 34 | 16 | 18 | 2647 | 2612 |
| Pamesa Valencia | 34 | 15 | 19 | 2615 | 2628 |
| Caja Ronda | 34 | 15 | 19 | 2435 | 2534 |
| Dyc Breogán | 34 | 15 | 19 | 2549 | 2667 |
| Zumos Júver Murcia | 34 | 15 | 19 | 2704 | 2755 |
| TDK Manresa | 34 | 15 | 19 | 2625 | 2752 |
| Cajabilbao | 34 | 12 | 22 | 2782 | 2911 |
| OAR Ferrol | 34 | 12 | 22 | 2571 | 2689 |

=== Playoffs ===
==== Relegation Playoffs ====
First Round
1 | Zumos Júver Murcia | 85 | 93 | 86
4 | Puleva Baloncesto Granada | 80 | 72 | 72
2 | Elosúa León | 106 | 95 | 92 | 82
3 | Cajabilbao | 86 | 97 | 89 | 72

Second Round
4 | Puleva Baloncesto Granada | 78 | 72 | 95 | 68 | 88
3 | Cajabilbao | 95 | 82 | 82 | 62 | 85

First Round
1 | Grupo IFA | 63 | 83 | 71 | 69
4 | OAR Ferrol | 64 | 70 | 66 | 67
2 | TDK Manresa | 78 | 85 | 89 | 62
3 | Cajacanarias | 74 | 79 | 99 | 61

Second Round
4 | OAR Ferrol | 91 | 82 | 66 | 72 | 94
3 | Cajacanarias | 78 | 68 | 73 | 76 | 64

Cajabilbao and Cajacanarias were relegated.

==== Championship Playoffs ====
First Round
1 | Montigalà Joventut | 2
16 | DYC Breogán | 0
8 | Valvi Girona | 0
9 | At. Madrid Villalba | 2
5 | Taugrés | 2
12 | Pamesa Valencia | 0
13 | Caja Ronda | 0
4 | Real Madrid Otaysa | 2
3 | Estudiantes CP | 2
14 | Caixa Ourense | 0
11 | Huesca La Magia | 0
6 | CAI Zaragoza | 2
7 | Fórum Valladolid | 2
10 | Mayoral Maristas | 0
15 | Caja San Fernando | 0
2 | FC Barcelona | 2

Quarterfinals
1 | Montigalà Joventut | 2
9 | At. Madrid Villalba | 0
5 | Taugrés | 2
4 | Real Madrid Otaysa | 0
3 | Estudiantes CP | 2
6 | CAI Zaragoza | 0
7 | Fórum Valladolid | 1
2 | FC Barcelona | 2

Semifinals
1 | Montigalà Joventut | 3
5 | Taugrés | 1
3 | Estudiantes CP | 1
2 | FC Barcelona | 3

Finals
1 | Montigalà Joventut | 3
2 | FC Barcelona | 1

1990-91 ACB League
Montigalà Joventut
3rd Title
1st since ACB
