= 1991–92 ACB season =

1991-92 ACB season
- League: Liga ACB
- Sport: Basketball
- Duration: September 14, 1991 - March 30, 1990
- Teams: 24
- TV partner: Televisión Española

Regular Season
- Season champions: Montigalà Joventut

Playoffs

ACB Finals
- Champions: Montigalà Joventut
- Finals MVP: (United States) Mike Smith

ACB seasons
- ← 1990–91 1992–93 →

The 1991–92 ACB season was the 9th season of the Liga ACB.

Montigalà Joventut won their second ACB title, and their 4th overall.

== Team Standings ==
=== Regular season ===
Advanced to Championship Playoffs
Advanced to Relegation Playoffs

Team	Pld	W	L	PF	PA
Montigalà Joventut	34	26	8	2885	2522
CAI Zaragoza	34	25	9	2760	2462
Elosúa León	34	25	9	2760	2558
Real Madrid Asegurator	34	24	10	2902	2656
Estudiantes Caja Postal	34	24	10	2828	2660
FC Barcelona Banca Catalana	34	24	10	2745	2517
Taugrés	34	24	10	2759	2565
Fórum Filatélico Valladolid	34	21	13	2755	2588
Pamesa Valencia	34	18	16	2640	2595
Huesca La Magia	34	18	16	2709	2756
OAR Ferrol	34	17	17	2600	2616
Júver Murcia	34	16	18	2680	2715
Valvi Girona	34	16	18	2668	2671
Granollers	34	16	18	2769	2749
TDK Manresa	34	15	19	2546	2540
Caja San Fernando	34	14	20	2588	2704
Unicaja Ronda	34	13	21	2455	2527
DYC Breogán	34	12	22	2563	2655
Mayoral Maristas	34	12	22	2698	2847
Ferrys Llíria	34	11	23	2440	2676
Gran Canaria	34	10	24	2413	2656
Coren Orense	34	10	24	2433	2775
Granada	34	9	25	2581	2805
Collado Villalba	34	8	26	2578	2940

=== Playoffs ===
==== Relegation Playoffs ====
First Round
17	Unicaja Ronda	70	97	68	72	65
24	Collado Villalba	72	74	73	58	63
20	Ferrys Llíria	107	91	73	73	86
21	Gran Canaria	97	90	76	70	60

Second Round
24	Collado Villalba	83	88	95	75	79
21	Gran Canaria	85	85	83	91	68

First Round
18	DYC Breogán	81	67	64
23	Granada	78	59	55
19	Mayoral Maristas	96	76	101
22	Coren Orense	88	70	79

Second Round
23	Granada	52	69	79
22	Coren Orense	74	79	80

Gran Canaria and Granada were relegated.

==== Championship Playoffs ====
First round
1	Montigalà Joventut	2
16	Caja San Fernando	0
8	Fórum Valladolid	2
9	Pamesa Valencia	0
5	Estudiantes CP	2
12	Valvi Girona	0
3	Elosúa León	2
13	Júver Murcia	0
2	CAI Zaragoza	2
15	TDK Manresa	0
7	Taugrés	2
10	Huesca La Magia	1
4	Real Madrid	2
14	Granollers	0
6	FC Barcelona	2
11	OAR Ferrol	0

Quarterfinals
1	Montigalà Joventut	2
8	Fórum Valladolid	0
5	Estudiantes CP	2
3	Elosúa León	0
2	CAI Zaragoza	1
7	Taugrés	2
4	Real Madrid	2
6	FC Barcelona	0

Semifinals
1	Montigalà Joventut	3
5	Estudiantes Caja P.	2
7	Taugrés	2
4	Real Madrid	3

Finals
1	Montigalà Joventut	3
4	Real Madrid	2

1991-92 ACB League
Montigalà Joventut
4th title
2nd since ACB
