= 1987–88 ACB season =

ACB Primera División
- Season: 1987–88
- Games played: 264
- Teams: 16

Regular season
- Relegated: None (Note: No relegation occurred after the league was expanded to 24 teams, even though the relegation playoffs were played, but only for decide the final standings.)

Finals
- Champions: FC Barcelona; 2nd ACB title 5th Spanish title
- Runners-up: Real Madrid
- Semi-finalists: CAI Zaragoza; RAM Joventut

The 1987–88 ACB season was the 5th season of the ACB Primera División, the top Spanish professional basketball league. It started on 26 September 1987 with the first round of the regular season and ended on 24 May 1988 with the finals.

FC Barcelona won their second consecutive ACB title, and their fifth Spanish title.

== Teams ==
=== Promotion and relegation (pre-season) ===
A total of 16 teams contested the league, including 14 sides from the 1986–87 season and two promoted from the 1986–87 Primera División B.

Teams promoted from Primera División B

- Caja Ronda
- Bancobao Villalba

=== Venues and locations ===
Location of teams in 1987–88 ACB
Location of teams from Barcelona in 1987–88 ACB
Location of teams from the Canary Islands in 1987–88 ACB

Team	Home city	Arena
Bancobao Villalba	Collado Villalba	Municipal
Cacaolat Granollers	Granollers	Municipal
CAI Zaragoza	Zaragoza	Palacio de Deportes
Caja Ronda	Málaga	Ciudad Jardín
Cajabilbao	Bilbao	La Casilla
Cajacanarias	San Cristóbal de La Laguna	Juan Ríos Tejera
Estudiantes Todagrés	Madrid	Palacio de Deportes
FC Barcelona	Barcelona	Palau Blaugrana
Fórum Filatélico Valladolid	Valladolid	Pisuerga
IFA Espanyol	Barcelona	Palau dels Esports
Magia de Huesca	Huesca	Municipal
Oximesa Granada	Albolote	José Antonio Murado
RAM Joventut	Badalona	Club Joventut Badalona
Real Madrid	Madrid	Palacio de Deportes
Taugrés	Vitoria-Gasteiz	Mendizorrotza
TDK Manresa	Manresa	Congost

== First phase ==
=== Group Odd ===
Pos	Team	Pld	W	L	PF	PA	PD	Pts	Qualification
1	Fórum Filatélico Valladolid	14	11	3	1160	1091	+69	25	Qualification to Group A1
2	FC Barcelona	14	11	3	1299	1140	+159	25	Qualification to Group A1
3	Estudiantes Todagrés	14	9	5	1215	1142	+73	23	Qualification to Group A1
4	CAI Zaragoza	14	7	7	1182	1144	+38	21	Qualification to Group A1
5	Cacaolat Granollers	14	6	8	1205	1239	−34	20	Qualification to Group A2
6	Cajabilbao	14	6	8	1213	1219	−6	20	Qualification to Group A2
7	Oximesa Granada	14	5	9	1180	1238	−58	19	Qualification to Group A2
8	Caja Ronda	14	1	13	972	1213	−241	15	Qualification to Group A2

Source: Linguasport

=== Group Even ===
Pos	Team	Pld	W	L	PF	PA	PD	Pts	Qualification
1	Real Madrid	14	14	0	1350	1099	+251	28	Qualification to Group A1
2	RAM Joventut	14	9	5	1328	1221	+107	23	Qualification to Group A1
3	Cajacanarias	14	8	6	1287	1286	+1	22	Qualification to Group A1
4	Magia de Huesca	14	7	7	1264	1264	0	21	Qualification to Group A1
5	Taugrés	14	7	7	1290	1301	−11	21	Qualification to Group A2
6	TDK Manresa	14	7	7	1275	1298	−23	21	Qualification to Group A2
7	IFA Espanyol	14	2	12	1185	1333	−148	16	Qualification to Group A2
8	Bancobao Villalba	14	2	12	1179	1356	−177	16	Qualification to Group A2

Source: Linguasport

== Second phase ==
=== Group A1 ===
Pos	Team	Pld	W	L	PF	PA	PD	Pts	Qualification
1	FC Barcelona	14	12	2	1374	1188	+186	26	Qualification to quarterfinals
2	Real Madrid	14	11	3	1347	1174	+173	25	Qualification to quarterfinals
3	CAI Zaragoza	14	9	5	1232	1196	+36	23	Qualification to quarterfinals
4	RAM Joventut	14	8	6	1298	1186	+112	22	Qualification to quarterfinals
5	Estudiantes Todagrés	14	7	7	1160	1218	−58	21	Qualification to first round
6	Cajacanarias	14	5	9	1228	1389	−161	19	Qualification to first round
7	Fórum Filatélico Valladolid	14	3	11	1064	1226	−162	17	Qualification to first round
8	Magia de Huesca	14	1	13	1133	1259	−126	15	Qualification to first round

Source: Linguasport

=== Group A2 ===
Pos	Team	Pld	W	L	PF	PA	PD	Pts	Qualification
1	Cacaolat Granollers	14	11	3	1232	1147	+85	25	Qualification to first round
2	Taugrés	14	9	5	1288	1213	+75	23	Qualification to first round
3	Oximesa Granada	14	9	5	1249	1168	+81	23	Qualification to first round
4	Cajabilbao	14	9	5	1213	1180	+33	23	Qualification to first round
5	TDK Manresa	14	8	6	1169	1152	+17	22	Qualification to relegation playoffs
6	Bancobao Villalba	14	5	9	1225	1284	−59	19	Qualification to relegation playoffs
7	IFA Espanyol	14	5	9	1138	1189	−51	19	Qualification to relegation playoffs
8	Caja Ronda	14	0	14	1209	1390	−181	14	Qualification to relegation playoffs

Source: Linguasport

== Playoffs ==
=== Championship playoffs ===
First round
A1–8 Magia de Huesca	91	98
A2–1 Cacaolat Granollers	95	119
A1–5 Estudiantes Todagrés	93	83
A2–4 Cajabilbao	87	77
A1–7 Fórum Valladolid	76	77
A2–2 Taugrés	84	84
A1–6 Cajacanarias	79	98	88
A2–3 Oximesa Granada	83	85	86

Quarterfinals
A1–1 FC Barcelona	116	77
A2–1 Cacaolat Granollers	85	75
A1–4 RAM Joventut	102	78
A1–5 Estudiantes Todagrés	93	75
A1–2 Real Madrid	81	103	90
A2–2 Taugrés	89	55	86
A1–3 CAI Zaragoza	104	108
A1–6 Cajacanarias	90	92

Semifinals
A1–1 FC Barcelona	97	88	90	80	86
A1–4 RAM Joventut	75	90	96	74	67
A1–2 Real Madrid	93	89	93
A1–3 CAI Zaragoza	84	88	92

Finals
A1–1 FC Barcelona	75	87	85	78	93
A1–2 Real Madrid	73	77	90	90	79

Source: Linguasport

=== Relegation playoffs ===
Team 1	Series	Team 2	Game 1	Game 2	Game 3	Game 4	Game 5
TDK Manresa	2–3	Caja Ronda	107–100	104–81	93–105	88–95	110–112
Bancobao Villalba	3–1	IFA Espanyol	95–85	99–100	105–104	79–78	

Source: Linguasport

== Final standings ==
Pos	Team	Pld	W	L	Qualification
1	FC Barcelona (C)	40	31	9	Qualification to European Champions Cup
2	Real Madrid	39	32	7	Qualification to European Cup Winners' Cup
3	CAI Zaragoza	33	18	15	Qualification to Korać Cup
4	RAM Joventut	35	21	14	Qualification to Korać Cup
5	Estudiantes Todagrés	32	18	14	Qualification to Korać Cup
6	Cajacanarias	33	15	18	Qualification to Korać Cup
7	Cacaolat Granollers	32	19	13	
8	Taugrés	33	19	14	
9	Fórum Filatélico Valladolid	30	14	16	
10	Magia de Huesca	30	8	22	
11	Oximesa Granada	31	15	16	
12	Cajabilbao	30	15	15	
13	Bancobao Villalba	32	10	22	
14	Caja Ronda	33	4	29	
15	TDK Manresa	33	17	16	
16	IFA Espanyol	32	8	24	

Source: Linguasport
(C) Champions
