= 1986–87 ACB season =

ACB Primera División
- Season: 1986–87
- Games played: 262
- Teams: 16

Regular season
- Relegated: Leche Rio Breogán; Clesa Ferrol

Finals
- Champions: FC Barcelona; 1st ACB title 4th Spanish title
- Runners-up: Ron Negrita Joventut
- Semifinalists: CAI Zaragoza; Real Madrid

The 1986–87 ACB season was the 4th season of the ACB Primera División, the top Spanish professional basketball league. It started on 13 September 1986 with the first round of the regular season and ended on 25 April 1987 with the finals.

FC Barcelona won their first ACB title, and their fourth Spanish title.

== Format changes ==
Starting from this season, the promotions and relegations teams at the end of the season between ACB Primera División and Primera División B were reduced from three to two teams. For the championship playoffs, the semifinals and finals adopted the best-of-five playoff, instead of previous season's best-of-three playoff that were kept for the first round and quarterfinals. For the relegation playoffs, were reduced from two to one round and adopted the best-of-five playoff.

== Teams ==
=== Promotion and relegation (pre-season) ===
A total of 16 teams contested the league, including 13 sides from the 1985–86 season and three promoted from the 1985–86 Primera División B.

Teams promoted from Primera División B

- Cajacanarias
- Cajabilbao
- Oximesa Granada

=== Venues and locations ===
Location of teams in 1986–87 ACB
Location of teams from Barcelona in 1986–87 ACB
Location of teams from the Canary Islands in 1986–87 ACB

Team	Home city	Arena
Cacaolat Granollers	Granollers	Municipal
CAI Zaragoza	Zaragoza	Palacio de Deportes
Caja Álava	Vitoria-Gasteiz	Mendizorrotza
Cajabilbao	Bilbao	La Casilla
Cajacanarias	San Cristóbal de La Laguna	San Benito
Clesa Ferrol	Ferrol	A Malata
Estudiantes Caja Postal	Madrid	Antonio Magariños
Estudiantes Caja Postal	Madrid	Palacio de Deportes
FC Barcelona	Barcelona	Palau Blaugrana
Fórum Filatélico Valladolid	Valladolid	Huerta del Rey
Gin MG Sarriá	Barcelona	Palau dels Esports
Leche Rio Breogán	Lugo	Municipal
Magia de Huesca	Huesca	Municipal
Oximesa Granada	Albolote	José Antonio Murado
Real Madrid	Madrid	Palacio de Deportes
Ron Negrita Joventut	Badalona	Club Joventut Badalona
TDK Manresa	Manresa	Congost

== First phase ==
=== Group Odd ===
Pos	Team	Pld	W	L	PF	PA	PD	Pts	Qualification
1	Real Madrid	14	12	2	1337	1151	+186	26	Qualification to Group A1
2	Ron Negrita Joventut	14	12	2	1295	1190	+105	26	Qualification to Group A1
3	Estudiantes Caja Postal	14	7	7	1310	1275	+35	21	Qualification to Group A1
4	Cajabilbao	14	7	7	1214	1247	−33	21	Qualification to Group A1
5	Magia de Huesca	14	5	9	1152	1221	−69	19	Qualification to Group A2
6	Caja Álava	14	5	9	1135	1208	−73	19	Qualification to Group A2
7	Leche Río Breogán	14	5	9	1168	1237	−69	19	Qualification to Group A2
8	Fórum Filatélico Valladolid	14	3	11	1159	1241	−82	17	Qualification to Group A2

Source: Linguasport

=== Group Even ===
Pos	Team	Pld	W	L	PF	PA	PD	Pts	Qualification
1	FC Barcelona	14	12	2	1394	1153	+241	26	Qualification to Group A1
2	CAI Zaragoza	14	11	3	1322	1173	+149	25	Qualification to Group A1
3	Cajacanarias	14	9	5	1316	1265	+51	23	Qualification to Group A1
4	Cacaolat Granollers	14	8	6	1225	1249	−24	22	Qualification to Group A1
5	Gin MG Sarriá	14	6	8	1231	1255	−24	20	Qualification to Group A2
6	TDK Manresa	14	4	10	1153	1300	−147	18	Qualification to Group A2
7	Oximesa Granada	14	3	11	1145	1281	−136	17	Qualification to Group A2
8	Clesa Ferrol	14	3	11	1103	1213	−110	17	Qualification to Group A2

Source: Linguasport

== Second phase ==
=== Group A1 ===
Pos	Team	Pld	W	L	PF	PA	PD	Pts	Qualification
1	FC Barcelona	14	11	3	1473	1260	+213	25	Qualification to quarterfinals
2	Ron Negrita Joventut	14	11	3	1379	1320	+59	25	Qualification to quarterfinals
3	CAI Zaragoza	14	8	6	1306	1291	+15	22	Qualification to quarterfinals
4	Real Madrid	14	8	6	1350	1295	+55	22	Qualification to quarterfinals
5	Estudiantes Caja Postal	14	6	8	1324	1363	−39	20	Qualification to first round
6	Cajabilbao	14	5	9	1290	1399	−109	19	Qualification to first round
7	Cajacanarias	14	4	10	1339	1380	−41	18	Qualification to first round
8	Cacaolat Granollers	14	3	11	1192	1345	−153	17	Qualification to first round

Source: Linguasport

=== Group A2 ===
Pos	Team	Pld	W	L	PF	PA	PD	Pts	Qualification
1	TDK Manresa	14	9	5	1244	1227	+17	23	Qualification to first round
2	Oximesa Granada	14	9	5	1187	1181	+6	23	Qualification to first round
3	Caja Álava	14	8	6	1296	1264	+32	22	Qualification to first round
4	Magia de Huesca	14	8	6	1234	1225	+9	22	Qualification to first round
5	Fórum Filatélico Valladolid	14	7	7	1215	1195	+20	21	Qualification to relegation playoffs
6	Leche Río Breogán	14	7	7	1250	1224	+26	21	Qualification to relegation playoffs
7	Gin MG Sarriá	14	6	8	1242	1262	−20	20	Qualification to relegation playoffs
8	Clesa Ferrol	14	2	12	1151	1241	−90	16	Qualification to relegation playoffs

Source: Linguasport

== Playoffs ==
=== Championship playoffs ===
First round
A1–8 Cacaolat Granollers	96	93	96
A2–1 TDK Manresa	89	105	93
A1–5 Estudiantes	107	87
A2–4 Magia de Huesca	89	85
A1–7 Cajacanarias	97	81	98
A2–2 Oximesa Granada	90	88	97
A1–6 Cajabilbao	83	95	90
A2–3 Caja Álava	93	89	97

Quarterfinals
A1–1 FC Barcelona	99	101
A1–8 Cacaolat Granollers	79	76
A1–4 Real Madrid	104	115	98
A1–5 Estudiantes	95	121	86
A1–2 Joventut	91	116
A1–7 Cajacanarias	90	97
A1–3 CAI Zaragoza	109	87
A2–3 Caja Álava	93	86

Semifinals
A1–1 FC Barcelona	91	89	91	87
A1–4 Real Madrid	90	80	95	78
A1–2 Joventut	89	91	100
A1–3 CAI Zaragoza	77	85	95

Finals
A1–1 FC Barcelona	104	90	95	101
A1–2 Joventut	97	72	98	99

Source: Linguasport

=== Relegation playoffs ===
Team 1	Series	Team 2	Game 1	Game 2	Game 3	Game 4	Game 5
Fórum Filatélico Valladolid	3–0	Clesa Ferrol	76–65	89–86	98–91		
Leche Rio Breogán	1–3	Gin MG Sarriá	93–85	76–82	96–98	94–106	

Source: Linguasport

== Final standings ==
Pos	Team	Pld	W	L	Qualification or relegation
1	FC Barcelona (C)	38	31	7	Qualification to European Champions Cup
2	Ron Negrita Joventut	37	29	8	Qualification to European Cup Winners' Cup
3	CAI Zaragoza	33	21	12	Qualification to Korać Cup
4	Real Madrid	35	23	12	Qualification to Korać Cup
5	Estudiantes Caja Postal	33	16	17	Qualification to Korać Cup
6	Cajacanarias	33	15	18	
7	Cacaolat Granollers	33	13	20	
8	Caja Álava	33	15	18	
9	Cajabilbao	31	13	18	
10	TDK Manresa	31	14	17	Qualification to Korać Cup
11	Oximesa Granada	31	13	18	
12	Magia de Huesca	30	13	17	
13	Fórum Filatélico Valladolid	31	13	18	
14	Gin MG Sarriá	32	15	17	
15	Leche Rio Breogán (R)	32	13	19	Relegation to Primera División B
16	Clesa Ferrol (R)	31	5	26	Relegation to Primera División B

Source: Linguasport
(C) Champions; (R) Relegated
