= 1988–89 ACB season =

1988-89 ACB season
- League: Liga ACB
- Sport: Basketball
- Duration: October 15, 1988 - May 25, 1989
- Teams: 24
- TV partner: Televisión Española

Regular Season
- Season champions: FC Barcelona

Playoffs

ACB Finals
- Champions: FC Barcelona

ACB seasons
- ← 1987–88 1989–90 →

The 1988–89 ACB season was the 6th season of the Liga ACB, after changing its name. The number of teams increased from 16 to 24. The format also changed. The 24 teams were divided into two groups of 12. After playing a league, 24 teams were divided into three groups of eight teams each. The first six of the white group and the champions of the red and blue groups played for the title.

FC Barcelona won their third ACB title, and their 6th overall. It was their third ACB title in a row.

== Team Standings ==
=== First stage ===
Advanced to Group I
Advanced to Group II
Advanced to Group III

==== Group A-1 ====
Team	Pld	W	L	PF	PA
FC Barcelona	22	19	3	2076	1811
Real Madrid	22	18	4	2197	1930
Ram Joventut	22	15	7	2024	1892
CAI Zaragoza	22	14	8	1985	1850
Cacaolat Granollers	22	13	9	1915	1914
Magia de Huesca	22	11	11	1784	1873
Taugrés	22	10	12	2032	2045
Estudiantes Bose	22	8	14	1733	1880
Fórum Filatélico Valladolid	22	7	15	1884	1990
Puleva Baloncesto Granada	22	7	15	1921	2069
Cajabilbao	22	6	16	1796	1925
Cajcanarias	22	4	18	1923	2091

==== Group A-2 ====
Team	Pld	W	L	PF	PA
Clesa Ferrol	22	18	4	1909	1799
Caja Ronda	22	16	6	1885	1795
BBV Villalba	22	16	6	1975	1825
Mayoral Maristas	22	14	8	2018	1891
Grupo IFA	22	11	11	2010	1914
TDK Manresa	22	11	11	1776	1719
Valvi Girona	22	10	12	1856	1904
Gran Canaria	22	10	12	1675	1694
Dyc Breogán	22	9	13	1825	1940
Tenerife Nº 1	22	6	16	1707	1875
Caja Guipúzcoa	22	6	16	1807	1974
Pamesa Valencia	22	5	17	1785	1917

=== Second stage ===
Advanced to Championship Playoffs
Advanced to Qualification Playoffs
Advanced to Relegation Playoffs

==== Group I ====
Team	Pld	W	L	PF	PA
FC Barcelona	14	11	3	1287	1196
Real Madrid	14	11	3	1336	1245
Ram Joventut	14	8	6	1279	1227
Caja Ronda	14	7	7	1159	1148
CAI Zaragoza	14	7	7	1221	1252
Cacaolat Granollers	14	5	9	1182	1295
Clesa Ferrol	14	5	9	1208	1211
Magia de Huesca	14	2	12	1133	1231

==== Group II ====
Team	Pld	W	L	PF	PA
Taugrés	14	11	3	1299	1208
Cajabilbao	14	8	6	1219	1197
Mayoral Maristas	14	8	6	1131	1141
Pamesa Valencia	14	7	7	1126	1125
Fórum Filatélico Valladolid	14	7	7	1180	1197
Gran Canaria	14	7	7	1111	1082
Tenerife Nº 1	14	4	10	1130	1719
TDK Manresa	14	4	10	989	1024

==== Group III ====
Team	Pld	W	L	PF	PA
Grupo IFA	14	11	3	1225	1135
Estudiantes Bose	14	9	5	1171	1068
Puleva Baloncesto Granada	14	8	6	1218	1188
BBV Villalba	14	8	6	1133	1135
Dyc Breogán	14	7	7	1142	1102
Cajacanarias	14	5	9	1193	1229
Valvi Girona	14	5	9	1123	1207
Caja Guipúzcoa	14	3	11	1113	1254

=== Playoffs ===
==== Relegation Playoffs ====
First Round
1	Fórum Valladolid	86	81	75	94
4	Caja Guipúzcoa	70	84	72	75
2	Cajacanarias	72	87	80	77	88
3	Tenerife Nº 1	74	78	76	80	79

Second Round
4	Caja Guipúzcoa	82	69	67
3	Tenerife Nº 1	89	80	78

First Round
1	Dyc Breogán	68	77	80	74
4	TDK Manresa	76	83	75	76
2	Gran Canaria	69	71	84
3	Valvi Girona	64	52	76

Second Round
1	Dyc Breogán	76	68	80	75	78
3	Valvi Girona	72	69	74	76	61

Caja Guipúzcoa and Valvi Girona were relegated.

==== Qualification Games ====
(I-1) Clesa Ferrol vs. (II-3) Pamesa Valencia
Clesa Ferrol win the series 3-0 and qualified to play in the A-1 the next season

- Game 1 May 6, 1989 @ Ferrol: Clesa Ferrol 100 - Pamesa Valencia 76
- Game 2 May 8, 1989 @ Ferrol: Clesa Ferrol 111 - Pamesa Valencia 107
- Game 3 May 11, 1989 @ Valencia: Pamesa Valencia 79 - Clesa Ferrol - 83

(I-2) Magia de Huesca vs. (III-3) BBV Villalba
BBV Villalba win the series 3-2 and qualified to play in the A-1 the next season

- Game 1 May 6, 1989 @ Huesca: Magia de Huesca 67 - BBV Villalba 66
- Game 2 May 8, 1989 @ Huesca: Magia de Huesca 66 - BBV Villalba 73
- Game 3 May 11, 1989 @ Collado Villalba: BBV Villalba 82 - Magia de Huesca 53
- Game 4 May 13, 1989 @ Collado Villalba: BBV Villalba 70 - Magia de Huesca 88
- Game 5 May 16, 1989 @ Huesca: Magia de Huesca 67 - BBV Villaba 78

(III-1) Estudiantes Bose vs. (II-2) Mayoral Maristas
Estudiantes Bose win the series 3-0 and qualified to play in the A-1 the next season

- Game 1 May 6, 1989 @ Madrid: Estudiantes Bose 102 - Mayoral Maristas 80
- Game 2 May 8, 1989 @ Madrid: Estudiantes Bose 87 - Mayoral Maristas 82
- Game 3 May 11, 1989 @ Málaga: Mayoral Maristas 80 - Estudiantes Bose 91

(II-1) Cajabilbao vs. (III-2) Puleva Baloncesto Granada
Cajabilbao win the series 3-2 and qualified to play in the A-1 the next season

- Game 1 May 6, 1989 @ Bilbao: Cajabilbao 94 - Puleva Baloncesto Granada 87
- Game 2 May 8, 1989 @ Bilbao: Cajabilbao 69 - Puleva Baloncesto Granada 79
- Game 3 May 11, 1989 @ Granada: Puleva Baloncesto Granada 79 - Cajabilbao 83
- Game 4 May 13, 1989 @ Granada: Puleva Baloncesto Granada 83 - Cajabilbao 79
- Game 5 May 16, 1989 @ Bilbao: Cajabilbao 70 - Puleva Baloncesto Granada 69

==== Championship Playoffs ====
Quarterfinals
1	FC Barcelona	104	106
8	Grupo IFA	84	89
4	Caja Ronda	81	75
5	CAI Zaragoza	87	94
3	Ram Joventut	99	85
6	Cacaolat Granollers	79	82
2	Real Madrid	105	81
7	Taugrés	90	77

Semifinals
1	FC Barcelona	95	100	105
5	CAI Zaragoza	73	93	78
3	Ram Joventut	92	70	90	76
2	Real Madrid	93	93	87	87

Final
1	FC Barcelona	94	81	100	87	96
2	Real Madrid	69	88	86	88	85

1988-89 ACB League
FC Barcelona
6th Title
3rd since ACB
