= 1989–90 ACB season =

1989-90 ACB season
- League: Liga ACB
- Sport: Basketball
- Duration: September 19, 1989 - May 30, 1990
- Teams: 24
- TV partner: Televisión Española

Regular Season
- Season champions: FC Barcelona

Playoffs

ACB Finals
- Champions: FC Barcelona

ACB seasons
- ← 1988–89 1990–91 →

The 1989–90 ACB season was the 7th season of the Liga ACB, after changing its name. The competition format was the same as the previous season.

FC Barcelona won their 4th ACB title, and their 7th overall. It was their 4th ACB title in a row.

== Team Standings ==
=== First stage ===
Advanced to Group I
Advanced to Group II
Advanced to Group III

==== Group A-1 ====
Team	Pld	W	L	PF	PA
Ram Joventut	22	16	6	1908	1703
Real Madrid	22	15	7	1957	1885
FC Barcelona	22	14	8	2058	1883
Estudiantes Caja Postal	22	14	8	1826	1775
Caja Ronda	22	14	8	1787	1737
CAI Zaragoza	22	12	10	1870	1808
Taugrés	22	11	11	1921	1867
Grupo IFA	22	11	11	1850	1865
Valvi Girona	22	9	13	1805	1923
Cajabilbao	22	7	15	1745	1880
BBV Collado Villalba	22	7	15	1745	1857
Clesa Ferrol	22	2	20	1626	1915

==== Group A-2 ====
Team	Pld	W	L	PF	PA
Fórum Valladolid	22	20	2	1921	1727
Mayoral Maristas	22	15	7	1818	1746
Huesca Magia	22	14	8	1905	1795
Pamesa Valencia	22	13	9	1886	1815
Dyc Breogán	22	12	10	1764	1682
Cajacanarias	22	11	11	1818	1825
TDK Manresa	22	10	12	1818	1813
Caixa Ourense	22	9	13	1689	1794
Puleva Balonceto Granada	22	8	14	1620	1705
Gran Canaria	22	8	14	1586	1695
Caja San Fernando	22	6	16	1757	1914
Tenerife Nº 1	22	6	16	1708	1805

=== Second stage ===
Advanced to Championship Playoffs
Advanced to Qualification Playoffs
Advanced to Relegation Playoffs

==== Group I ====
Team	Pld	W	L	PF	PA
FC Barcelona	14	13	1	1291	1111
Real Madrid	14	9	5	1202	1152
Ram Joventut	14	8	6	1188	1193
Caja Ronda	14	7	7	1087	1110
Estudiantes Caja Postal	14	6	8	1125	1129
Fórum Valladolid	14	6	8	1103	1154
CAI Zaragoza	14	5	9	1145	1159
Mayoral Maristas	14	2	12	1072	1205

==== Group II ====
Team	Pld	W	L	PF	PA
Grupo IFA	14	10	4	1252	1156
Huesca Magia	14	9	5	1212	1159
Cajabilbao	14	9	5	1198	1192
Caja San Fernando	14	8	6	1112	1134
Dyc Breogán	14	7	7	1152	1147
Clesa Ferrol	14	6	8	1167	1128
Puleva Granada Baloncesto	14	5	9	1129	1150
TDK Manresa	14	2	12	1103	1259

==== Group III ====
Team	Pld	W	L	PF	PA
Taugrés	14	12	2	1266	1077
Pamesa Valencia	14	11	3	1252	1145
BBV Villalba	14	9	5	1223	1180
Cajacanarias	14	6	8	1230	1228
Valvi Girona	14	6	8	1166	1177
Gran Canaria	14	5	9	1038	1127
Tenerife Nº 1	14	4	10	1190	1314
Caixa Ourense	14	3	11	1183	1301

=== Playoffs ===
==== Relegation Playoffs ====
First Round
1	Dyc Breogán	79	98	76	79
4	Caixa Ourense	83	80	66	70
2	Gran Canaria	72	83	73	67
3	Puleva Granada	86	71	82	83

Second Round
4	Caixa Ourense	62	76	54	76
2	Gran Canaria	61	63	56	67

First Round
1	Valvi Girona	86	67	86
4	TDK Manresa	85	61	77
2	Clesa Ferrol	84	81	86	73	88
3	Tenerife Nº 1	71	88	80	76	76

Second Round
4	TDK Manresa	84	87	85	88
3	Tenerife Nº 1	83	91	83	83

Tenerife Nº 1 and Gran Canaria were relegated.

==== Qualification Games ====
(I-1) CAI Zaragoza vs. (III-3) Cajacanarias
CAI Zaragoza win the series 3-0 and qualified to play in the A-1 the next season

- Game 1 May 4, 1990 @ Zaragoza: CAI Zaragoza 129 - Cajacanarias 82
- Game 2 May 6, 1990 @ Zaragoza: CAI Zaragoza 98 - Cajacanarias 82
- Game 3 May 11, 1990 @ La Laguna: Cajacanarias 83 - CAI Zaragoza 111

(I-2) Mayoral Maristas vs. (II-3) Caja San Fernando
Caja San Fernando win the series 3-1 and qualified to play in the A-1 the next season

- Game 1 May 4, 1990 @ Málaga: Mayoral Maristas 78 - Caja San Fernando 75
- Game 2 May 6, 1990 @ Málaga: Mayoral Maristas 67 - Caja San Fernando 76
- Game 3 May 10, 1990 @ Sevilla: Caja San Fernando 85 - Mayoral Maristas 78
- Game 4 May 12, 1990 @ Sevilla: Caja San Fernando 90 - Mayoral Maristas 86

(III-1) Pamesa Valencia vs. (II-2) Cajabilbao
Pamesa Valencia win the series 3-0 and qualified to play in the A-1 the next season

- Game 1 May 3, 1990 @ Valencia: Pamesa Valencia 91 - Cajabilbao 90
- Game 2 May 5, 1990 @ Valencia: Pamesa Valencia 85 - Cajabilbao 83
- Game 3 May 10, 1990 @ Bilbao: Cajabilbao 86 - Pamesa Valencia 88

(II-1) Huesca Magia vs. (III-2) BBV Villalba
BBV Villalba win the series 3-1 and qualified to play in the A-1 the next season

- Game 1 May 3, 1990 @ Huesca: Huesca Magia 83 - BBV Villalba 86
- Game 2 May 5, 1990 @ Huesca: Huesca Magia 83 - BBV Villalba 87
- Game 3 May 10, 1990 @ Collado Villalba: BBV Villalba 89 - Huesca Magia 92
- Game 4 May 12, 1990 @ Collado Villalba: BBV Villalba 78 - Huesca Magia 71

==== Championship Playoffs ====
Quarterfinals
1	FC Barcelona	101	88
8	Grupo IFA	64	85
4	Caja Ronda	81	66
5	Estudiantes Caja Postal	84	77
3	Ram Joventut	81	83
6	Fórum Valladolid	69	67
2	Real Madrid	105	81
7	Taugrés	90	77

Semifinals
1	FC Barcelona	119	103	106
5	Estudiantes Caja Postal	94	71	89
3	Ram Joventut	93	86	77
2	Real Madrid	80	69	72

Final
1	FC Barcelona	102	94	107
3	Ram Joventut	91	92	87

1989-90 ACB League
FC Barcelona
7th Title
4th since ACB
