= ACB Player of the Month Award =

The ACB Player of the Month Award is a basketball award that recognises the best Liga ACB player for each month of the season.

This award has been given out since the 1991–92 season, and it is not decided by the Performance Index Rating, despite being partly based on it.

== Winners ==
Key
†	Award was shared with another player

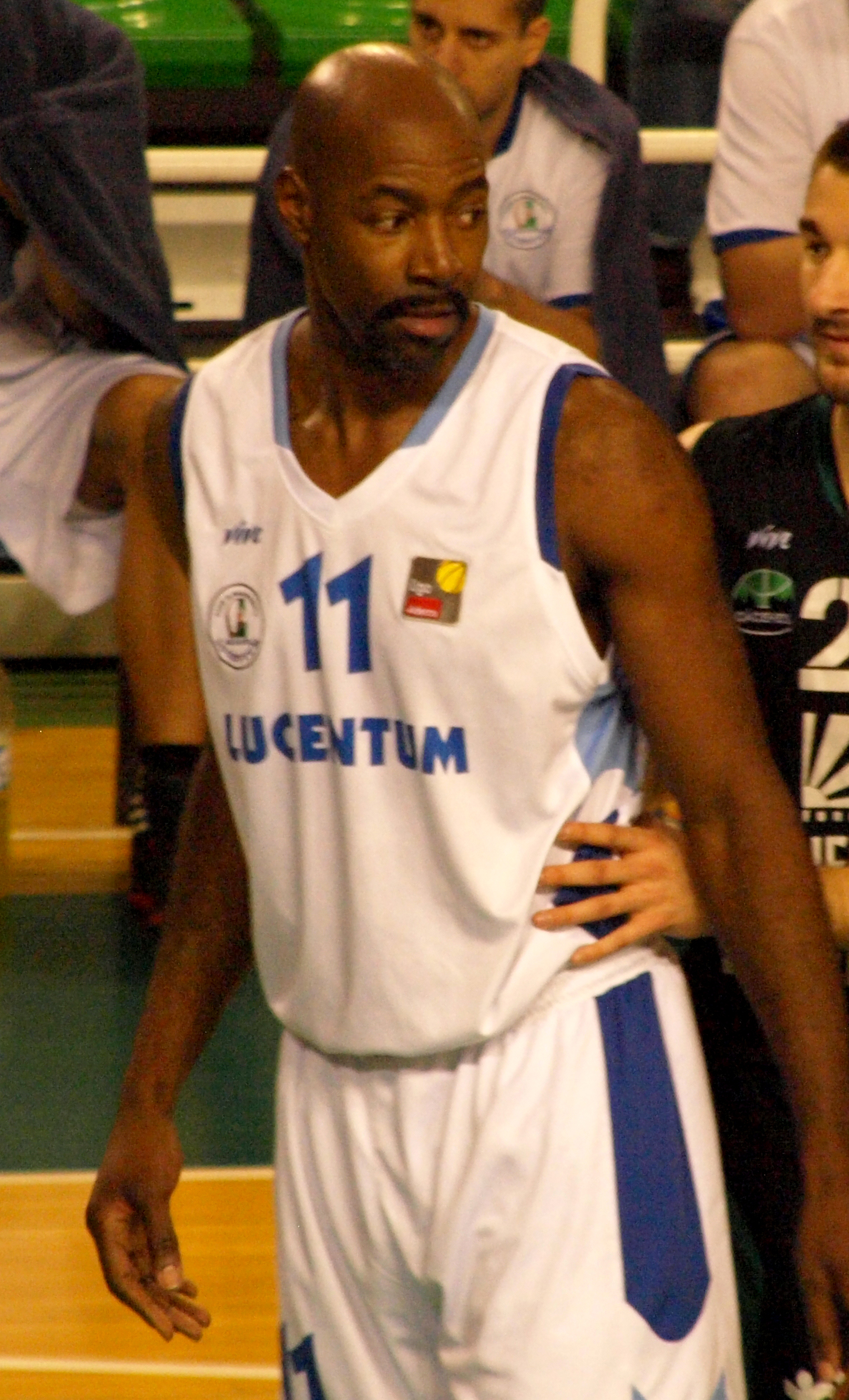

Darryl Middleton and Arvydas Sabonis shared the first Player of the Month Award.

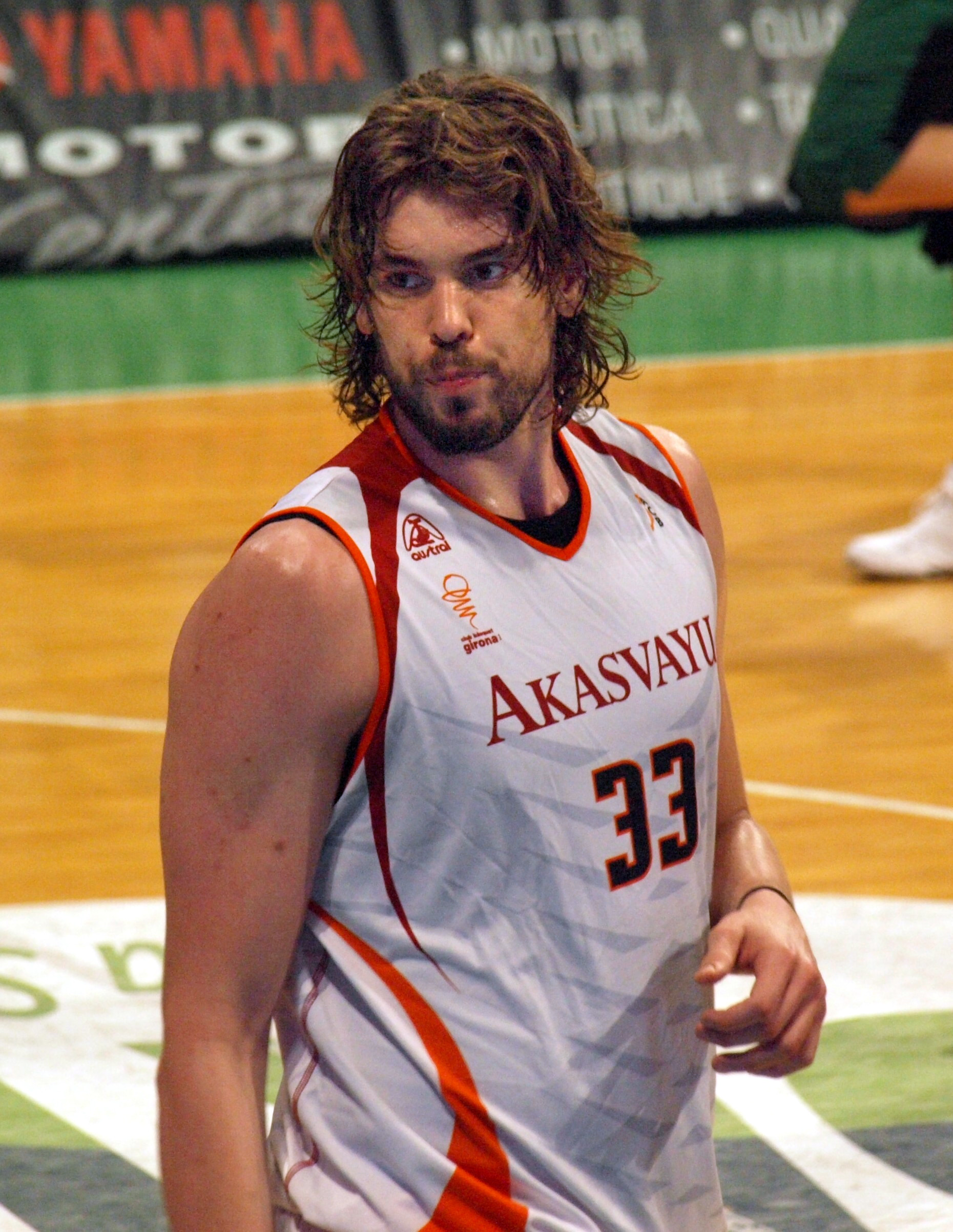
Marc Gasol is the Spaniard with the most awards. His five nominations were with Akasvayu Girona in the 2007–08 season.

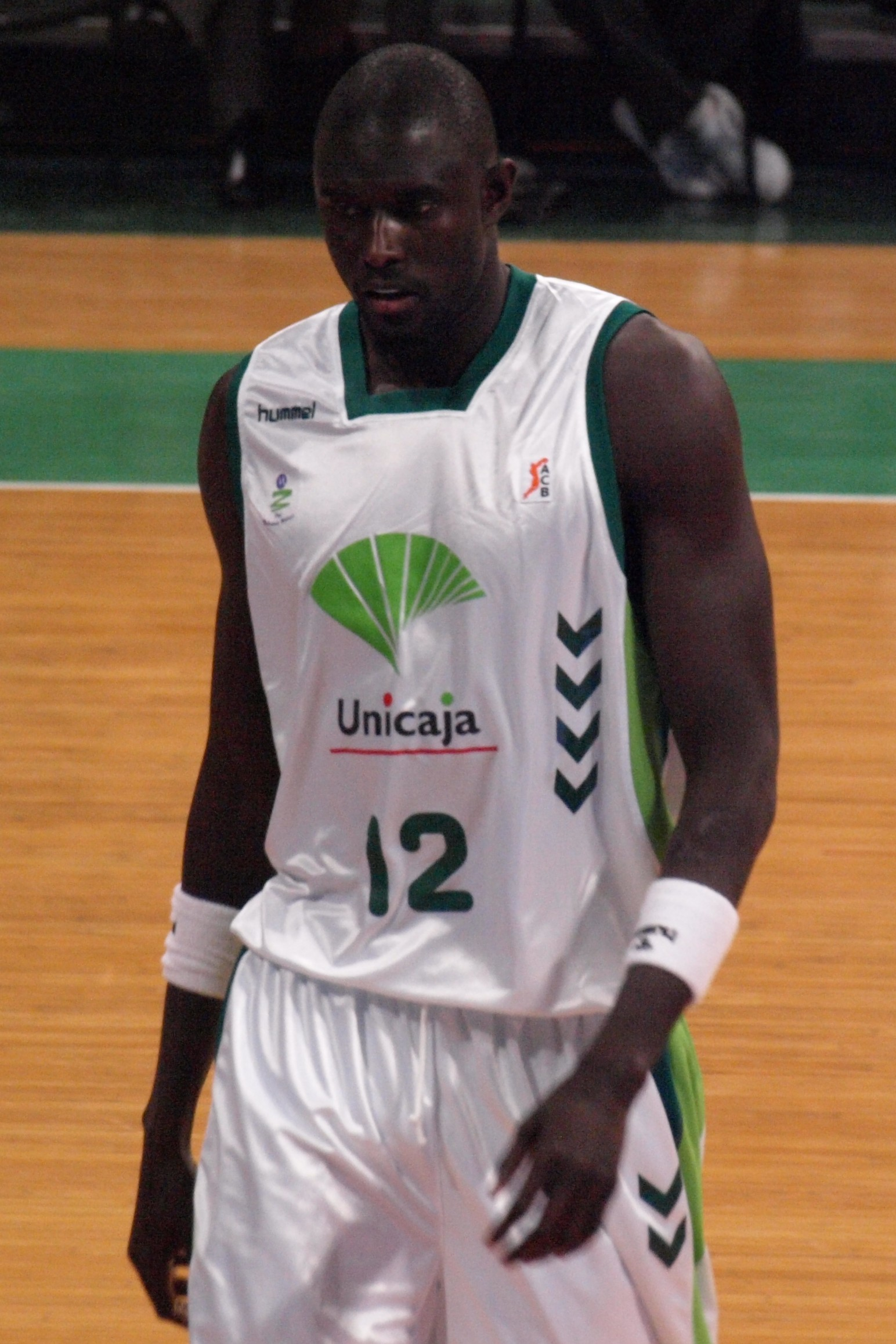
Boniface N'Dong was the first African player who won the award.

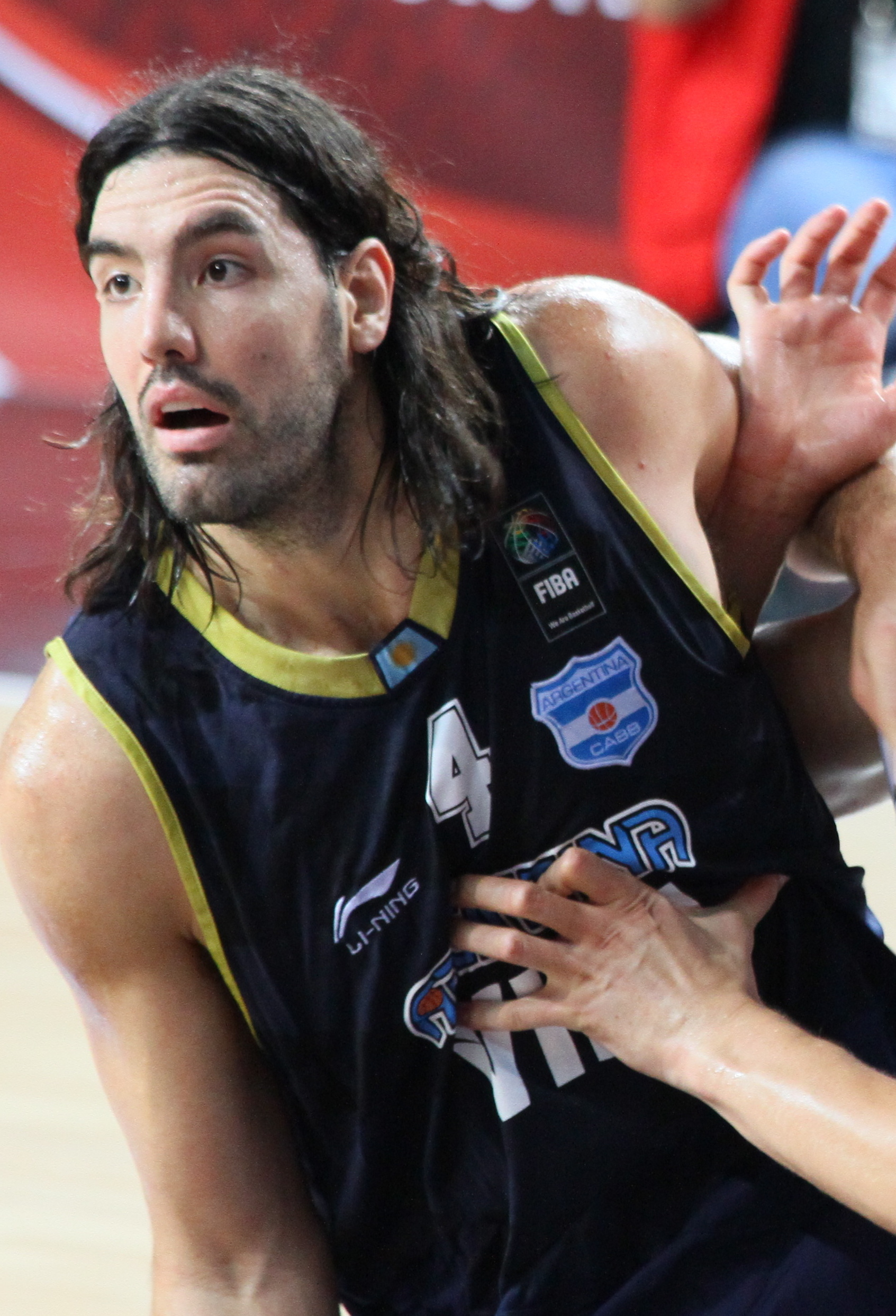
Luis Scola, four-time Player of the Month between 2005 and 2007.

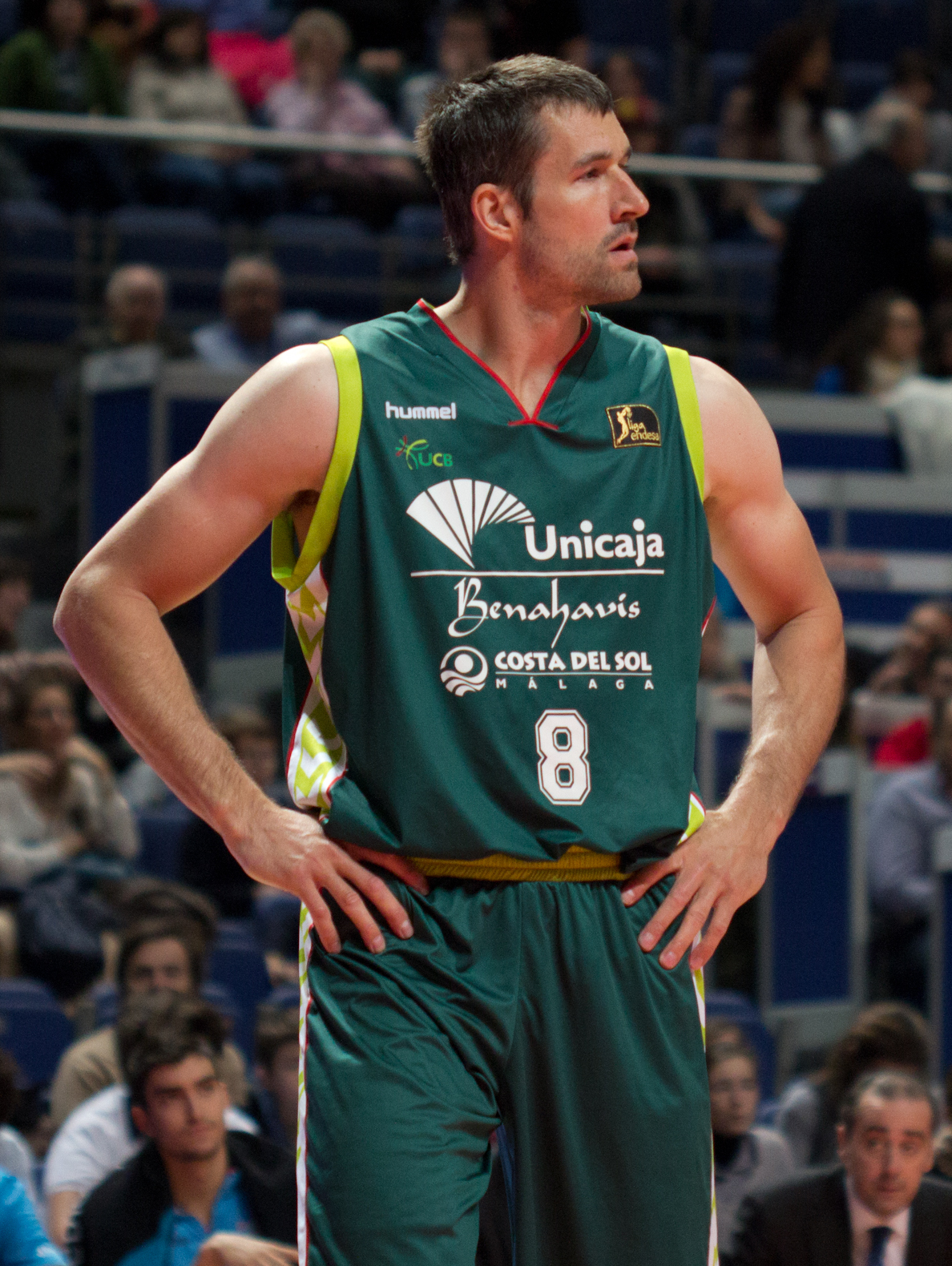
Andy Panko won the award five times.

Month	Year (Note: Each year is linked to an article on the particular season associated with the month of that year.)	Nationality	Player	Team	PIR	Ref
September	1991	United States	Darryl Middleton†	Girona		
September	1991	Lithuania	Arvydas Sabonis†	Valladolid		
October	1991	United States	Darryl Middleton	Girona		
November	1991	United States	Jeff Lamp	Oximesa		
December	1991	United States	Jeff Lamp	Oximesa		
January	1992	United States	Michael Turner	Collado Villalba		
February	1992	United States	Mike Ansley	Maristas		
March	1992	United States	Jeff Lamp	Oximesa		
September	1992	Lithuania	Arvydas Sabonis	Real Madrid		
October	1992	United States	Reggie Slater	Peñas		
November	1992	United States	Darryl Middleton	Sevilla		
December	1992	United States	Kevin Pritchard	Cáceres		
January	1993	Croatia	Velimir Perasović	Breogán		
February	1993	United States	Reggie Slater	Peñas		
March	1993	Jamaica	Wayne Sappleton	Llíria		
September	1993	United States	Darryl Middleton	Sevilla		
October	1993	United States	Granger Hall	Manresa		
November	1993	United States	John Ebeling	Murcia		
December	1993	Lithuania	Arvydas Sabonis	Real Madrid		
January	1994	United States	Michael Smith	Valencia		
February	1994	Lithuania	Arvydas Sabonis	Real Madrid		
March	1994	United States	Harper Williams	León		
September	1994	United States	Darrell Armstrong	Ourense		
October	1994	Lithuania	Arvydas Sabonis	Real Madrid		
November	1994	Lithuania	Arvydas Sabonis	Real Madrid		
December	1994	United States	Dyron Nix	Peñas		
February	1995	United States	Kenny Green	Baskonia		
March	1995	Lithuania	Arvydas Sabonis	Real Madrid		
September	1995	United States	Rod Sellers	Cáceres		
October	1995	United States	Kenny Green	Baskonia		
November	1995	United States	John Morton	Gran Canaria		
December	1995	Lithuania	Artūras Karnišovas	Barcelona		
January	1996	United States	Granger Hall	Salamanca		
February	1996	United States	Michael Anderson	Sevilla		
March	1996	United States	Michael Anderson	Sevilla		
April	1996	United States	Alphonso Ford	Peñas		
September	1996	United States	Kenny Green	Baskonia		
October	1996	United States	Kenny Green	Baskonia		
November	1996	United States	Wayne Tinkle	Granada		
December	1996	FR Yugoslavia	Dejan Bodiroga	Real Madrid		
January	1997	United States	Chris McNealy	León		
February	1997	United States	Tanoka Beard	Joventut		
March	1997	United States	Duane Washington	Murcia		
September	1997	United States	Bernard Hopkins	Gran Canaria		
October	1997	FR Yugoslavia	Dejan Bodiroga	Real Madrid		
November	1997	FR Yugoslavia	Dejan Bodiroga	Real Madrid		
December	1997	United States	Bernard Hopkins	Gran Canaria		
January	1998	United States	Buck Johnson	Girona		
February	1998	United States	Albert Burditt	Gran Canaria		
March	1998	United States	Thomas Jordan	Cantabria		
April	1998	United States	Tanoka Beard	Joventut		
September	1998	United States	Harper Williams	León		
October	1998	United States	Jackie Espinosa	Cantabria		
November	1998	United States	Aaron Swinson	Joventut		
December	1998	Russia	Sergei Babkov	Málaga		
January	1999	United States	Nate Huffman	Fuenlabrada		
February	1999	United States	Tanoka Beard	Real Madrid		
March	1999	United States	Tanoka Beard	Real Madrid		
April	1999	United States	Tanoka Beard	Real Madrid		
September	1999	United States	Danya Abrams	Cáceres	28.2	
October	1999	United States	Tanoka Beard	Valencia	24.8	
November	1999	Croatia	Velimir Perasović	Fuenlabrada	36.3	
December	1999	United States	Bernard Hopkins	Real Madrid	27.7	
January	2000	Spain	Alberto Herreros	Real Madrid	27.7	
February	2000	United States	Larry Stewart	Girona	27.0	
March	2000	United States	Darryl Middleton	Girona	28.3	
April	2000	United States	Darryl Middleton	Girona	28.6	
October	2000	United States	Elmer Bennett	Baskonia	29.5	
November	2000	United States	Richard Scott	Sevilla	30.4	
December	2000	United States	Derrick Alston	Valencia	28.0	
January	2001	Croatia	Velimir Perasović	Fuenlabrada	32.8	
February	2001	United States	Derrick Alston	Valencia	26.2	
March	2001	United States	Steve Payne	Cantabria	28.3	
April	2001	Germany	Ademola Okulaja	Girona	28.0	
May	2001	United States	Lou Roe	Gijón	31.0	
October	2001	United States	Tanoka Beard	Joventut	36.0	
November	2001	United States	Tanoka Beard	Joventut	31.3	
December	2001	United States	Bernard Hopkins	Valencia	28.2	
January	2002	United States	Tanoka Beard	Joventut	26.0	
February	2002	United States	Tanoka Beard	Joventut	27.2	
March	2002	Spain	Oriol Junyent	Granada	25.5	
April	2002	United States	John Williams	Valladolid	24.8	
May	2002	Portugal	Sérgio Ramos	Lleida	30.5	
October	2002	Spain	Javi Rodríguez	Breogán	22.8	
November	2002	Netherlands	Francisco Elson	Sevilla	25.5	
December	2002	United States	Lou Roe	Lucentum	30.8	
January	2003	Argentina	Walter Herrmann	Fuenlabrada	26.0	
February	2003	Argentina	Fabricio Oberto	Valencia	23.7	
March	2003	Argentina	Walter Herrmann	Fuenlabrada	30.5	
April	2003	Argentina	Walter Herrmann	Fuenlabrada	29.0	
May	2003	United States	Lou Roe	Lucentum	32.0	
October	2003	Lithuania	Arvydas Macijauskas	Baskonia	27.0	
November	2003	United States	Elmer Bennett	Real Madrid	27.2	
December	2003	United States	Bernard Hopkins	Tenerife	28.3	
January	2004	United States	Lou Roe	Lucentum	24.4	
February	2004	United States	Elmer Bennett	Real Madrid	27.3	
March	2004	United States	Lou Roe	Lucentum	26.5	
April	2004	United States	Lou Roe	Lucentum	30.0	
October	2004	United States	Lou Roe	Sevilla	28.4	
November	2004	Spain	Germán Gabriel	Bilbao	29.8	
December	2004	United States	Demetrius Alexander	Valladolid	31.0	
January	2005	United States	Charlie Bell	Breogán	30.8	
February	2005	United States	Charlie Bell†	Breogán	31.7	
February	2005	Argentina	Luis Scola†	Baskonia	31.7	
March	2005	United States	Charlie Bell	Breogán	31.0	
April	2005	United States	Lou Roe	Sevilla	31.0	
May	2005	Argentina	Fabricio Oberto	Valencia	33.5	
October	2005	Argentina	Luis Scola	Baskonia	22.2	
November	2005	United States	Pete Mickeal	Breogán	27.5	
December	2005	United States	Pete Mickeal	Breogán	27.2	
January	2006	Argentina	Luis Scola	Baskonia	26.8	
February	2006	United States	Lou Roe	Sevilla	33.0	
March	2006	United States	Pete Mickeal	Breogán	27.0	
April	2006	United States	Curtis Borchardt	Granada	30.3	
May	2006	Spain	Felipe Reyes	Real Madrid	30.7	
October	2006	Serbia	Dejan Milojević	Valencia	22.7	
November	2006	United States	Curtis Borchardt	Granada	25.8	
December	2006	United States	Curtis Borchardt	Granada	28.0	
January	2007	United States	Curtis Borchardt	Granada	28.5	
February	2007	Argentina	Luis Scola	Baskonia	26.7	
March	2007	United States	Charles Gaines	Joventut	22.4	
April	2007	Spain	Rudy Fernández	Joventut	26.6	
May	2007	United States	Chris Moss	Menorca	28.0	
October	2007	United States	Chris Moss	Menorca	22.0	
November	2007	Spain	Marc Gasol	Girona	31.2	
December	2007	Spain	Marc Gasol	Girona	24.5	
January	2008	Spain	Rudy Fernández	Joventut	34.5	
February	2008	Spain	Rudy Fernández	Joventut	25.7	
March	2008	Spain	Marc Gasol	Girona	29.5	
April	2008	Spain	Marc Gasol	Girona	33.8	
May	2008	Spain	Marc Gasol	Girona	28.0	
October	2008	Spain	Felipe Reyes	Real Madrid	30.8	
November	2008	Serbia	Igor Rakočević	Baskonia	26.2	
December	2008	United States	Curtis Borchardt	Granada	34.3	
January	2009	Canada	Carl English	Gran Canaria	24.3	
February	2009	United States	Brad Oleson	Fuenlabrada	30.5	
March	2009	Spain	Fran Vázquez	Barcelona	28.8	
April	2009	United States	Jimmie Hunter	Granada	21.2	
October	2009	United States	Gerald Fitch	Fuenlabrada	24.2	
November	2009	Serbia	Novica Veličković	Real Madrid	19.7	
December	2009	United States	Clay Tucker	Joventut	22.8	
January	2010	Argentina	Fede Van Lacke	Valladolid	22.4	
February	2010	United States	Omar Cook	Málaga	20.0	
March	2010	Spain	Carlos Suárez	Estudiantes	23.8	
April	2010	Brazil	Tiago Splitter	Baskonia	27.7	
May	2010	United States	Nik Caner-Medley	Estudiantes	22.7	
October	2010	Spain	Carlos Suárez	Real Madrid	22.4	
November	2010	Croatia	Stanko Barać	Baskonia	24.5	
December	2010	Spain	Víctor Claver	Valencia	18.8	
January	2011	Canada	Carl English	Joventut	27.2	
February	2011	United States	Nik Caner-Medley	Estudiantes	26.7	
March	2011	United States	Nik Caner-Medley	Estudiantes	22.4	
April	2011	United States	Nik Caner-Medley	Estudiantes	23.7	
May	2011	United States	Jaycee Carroll	Gran Canaria	23.0	
October	2011	Great Britain	Joel Freeland	Málaga	26.3	
November	2011	Mexico	Gustavo Ayón	Fuenlabrada	24.3	
December	2011	Bulgaria	Kaloyan Ivanov	Lucentum	26.5	
January	2012	United States	Justin Doellman	Manresa	25.0	
February	2012	Spain	Sergio Llull	Real Madrid	21.7	
March	2012	Spain	Sergi Vidal	Gipuzkoa	21.0	
April	2012	Senegal	Boniface N'Dong	Barcelona	18.2	
May	2012	United States	James Augustine	Murcia	30.0	
October	2012	Spain	Nikola Mirotić	Real Madrid	21.4	
November	2012	United States	Othello Hunter	Valladolid	21.0	
December	2012	Spain	Germán Gabriel	Estudiantes	21.1	
January	2013	Canada	Carl English	Estudiantes	22.0	
February	2013	Croatia	Ante Tomić	Barcelona	26.3	
March	2013	Spain	Nacho Martín	Valladolid	21.8	
April	2013	Spain	Albert Oliver	Joventut	25.8	
May	2013	United States	Justin Doellman	Valencia	23.0	
October	2013	Montenegro	Blagota Sekulić	Canarias	27.7	
November	2013	United States	Justin Doellman	Valencia	27.4	
December	2013	Montenegro	Blagota Sekulić	Canarias	21.0	
January	2014	United States	Andy Panko	Fuenlabrada	21.0	
February	2014	United States	Andy Panko	Fuenlabrada	27.3	
March	2014	Poland	Maciej Lampe	Barcelona	24.0	
April	2014	United States	Justin Doellman	Valencia	21.0	
May	2014	United States	Luke Sikma	Canarias	22.2	
October	2014	Montenegro	Blagota Sekulić	Canarias	22.4	
November	2014	Spain	Felipe Reyes	Real Madrid	19.6	
December	2014	United States	Andy Panko	Fuenlabrada	24.6	
January	2015	Nigeria	Jeleel Akindele	Fuenlabrada	23.0	
February	2015	United States	Andy Panko	Fuenlabrada	23.3	
March	2015	Montenegro	Marko Todorović	Bilbao	20.6	
April	2015	United States	Andy Panko	Fuenlabrada	23.3	
May	2015	Montenegro	Marko Todorović	Bilbao	22.0	
October	2015	Serbia	Dejan Musli	Manresa	23.5	
November	2015	United States	Justin Hamilton	Valencia	23.2	
December	2015	Greece	Ioannis Bourousis	Baskonia	23.4	
January	2016	Greece	Ioannis Bourousis	Baskonia	24.8	
February	2016	Spain	Sergio Llull	Real Madrid	22.3	
March	2016	Slovenia	Boštjan Nachbar	Sevilla	21.0	
April	2016	Czech Republic	Tomáš Satoranský	Barcelona	21.3	
May	2016	Mexico	Gustavo Ayón	Real Madrid	28.0	
October	2016	United States (Note: Scott Bamforth did not play with the Kosovo national team when the award was given, so he is considered in that moment as American.)	Scott Bamforth	Bilbao	22.8	
November	2016	Serbia	Stevan Jelovac	Zaragoza	23.6	
December	2016	Croatia	Ante Tomić	Barcelona	22.4	
January	2017	Georgia	Giorgi Shermadini	Andorra	27.8	
February	2017	United States	Shane Larkin	Baskonia	33.5	
March	2017	Georgia	Giorgi Shermadini	Andorra	25.8	
April	2017	Montenegro	Bojan Dubljević	Valencia	20.6	
May	2017	Georgia	Giorgi Shermadini	Andorra	24.7	
October	2017	Netherlands	Henk Norel	Gipuzkoa	24.2	
November	2017	United States	Gary Neal	Zaragoza	22.0	
December	2017	Slovenia	Luka Dončić	Real Madrid	24.0	
January	2018	United States	Clevin Hannah	Murcia	21.0	
February	2018	United States	Gary Neal	Zaragoza	39.0	
March	2018	Croatia	Ante Tomić	Barcelona	23.8	
April	2018	United States	Gary Neal	Zaragoza	23.8	
May	2018	Argentina	Nicolás Laprovíttola	Joventut	22.0	
October	2018	Georgia	Tornike Shengelia	Baskonia	19.8	
November	2018	Spain	Javier Beirán	Canarias	21.3	
December	2018	Greece	Kostas Vasileiadis	Obradoiro	22.6	
January	2019	United States	Colton Iverson	Canarias	23.5	
February	2019	Georgia	Giorgi Shermadini†	Málaga	27.0	
February	2019	United States	Dominique Sutton†	Burgos	27.0	
March	2019	Senegal	Moussa Diagne	Andorra	20.5	
April	2019	Argentina	Facundo Campazzo	Real Madrid	22.7	
May	2019	Montenegro	Marko Todorović	Joventut	25.0	
September	2019	Uganda	Brandon Davies	Barcelona	30.0	
October	2019	Spain	Nikola Mirotić	Barcelona	30.0	
November	2019	United States	Askia Booker	Murcia	23.7	
December	2019	Georgia	Giorgi Shermadini	Canarias	24.6	
January	2020	Spain	Nikola Mirotić	Barcelona	28.7	
February	2020	Georgia	Tornike Shengelia	Baskonia	29.0	
March	2020	Georgia	Tornike Shengelia	Baskonia	30.5	
September	2020	Lithuania	Laurynas Birutis	Obradoiro	27.7	
October	2020	Georgia	Giorgi Shermadini	Canarias	28.7	
November	2020	France	Louis Labeyrie	Valencia	26.0	
December	2020	Canada	Dylan Ennis	Zaragoza	23.6	
January	2021	Georgia	Giorgi Shermadini	Canarias	27.0	
February	2021	Cape Verde	Edy Tavares	Real Madrid	27.7	
March	2021	Georgia	Giorgi Shermadini†	Canarias	25.5	
March	2021	Georgia	Thad McFadden†	Burgos	25.5	
April	2021	Dominican Republic	Ángel Delgado	Estudiantes	24.0	
May	2021	Dominican Republic	Ángel Delgado	Estudiantes	27.0	
September	2021	Spain	Nikola Mirotić	Barcelona	27.7	
October	2021	Cape Verde	Edy Tavares	Real Madrid	20.2	
November	2021	Uruguay	Jayson Granger	Baskonia	25.0	
December	2021	Bosnia and Herzegovina	Džanan Musa	Breogán	34.0	
January	2022	United States	James Webb	Murcia	24.5	
February	2022	Bosnia and Herzegovina	Džanan Musa	Breogán	30.5	
March	2022	Georgia	Giorgi Shermadini	Canarias	24.4	
April	2022	Georgia	Giorgi Shermadini	Canarias	27.4	
May	2022	United States	Shannon Evans	Real Betis	37.0	
October	2022	Cuba	Jasiel Rivero	Valencia	26.5	
November	2022	Croatia	Ante Tomić	Joventut	21.0	
December	2022	Cuba	Jasiel Rivero	Valencia	20.7	
January	2023	Cape Verde	Edy Tavares†	Real Madrid	26.8	
January	2023	Georgia	Giorgi Shermadini†	Canarias	26.8	
February	2023	Argentina	Nicolás Brussino	Gran Canaria	31.5	
March	2023	United States	Ethan Happ	Breogán	20.8	
April	2023	Montenegro	Bojan Dubljević	Valencia	23.5	
May	2023	France	Guerschon Yabusele	Real Madrid	25.0	
September	2023	Bosnia and Herzegovina	Džanan Musa	Real Madrid	22.3	
October	2023	Cape Verde	Edy Tavares	Real Madrid	23.3	
November	2023	Argentina	Nicolás Brussino	Gran Canaria	26.8	
December	2023	Nigeria	Chima Moneke	Baskonia	25.4	
January	2024	Georgia	Giorgi Shermadini	Canarias	24.3	
February	2024	Montenegro	Marko Todorović	Murcia	29.0	
March	2024	Georgia	Giorgi Shermadini	Canarias	22.4	
April	2024	Dominican Republic	Jean Montero	Andorra	23.5	
May	2024	Ukraine	Artem Pustovyi	Obradoiro	22.3	
October	2024	United States	Jerrick Harding	Andorra	20.8	
November	2024	Croatia	Ante Tomić	Joventut	24.0	
December	2024	Angola	Jilson Bango	Zaragoza	23.4	
January	2025	United States	Derrick Alston Jr.	Manresa	22.0	
February	2025	Croatia	Ante Tomić	Joventut	25.0	
March	2025	Dominican Republic	Jean Montero	Valencia	27.5	
April	2025	Croatia	Ante Tomić	Joventut	27.5	
May	2025	Dominican Republic	Jean Montero	Valencia	22.4	
October	2025	Georgia	Giorgi Shermadini	Canarias	27.0	
November	2025	France	Théo Maledon	Real Madrid	18.8	
December	2025	France	Timothé Luwawu-Cabarrot	Baskonia	24.0	
January	2026	Croatia	Mario Hezonja	Real Madrid	23.8	
February	2026	Jamaica	Devontae Cacok	UCAM Murcia	27.0	
March	2026	Croatia	Luka Božić	Granada	26.8	
April	2026	Croatia	Luka Božić	Granada	30.3	
October	2026	France	Théo Maledon	Real Madrid	25.8	

== Multiple winners ==
The below table lists those who have won on more than one occasion.

*	Indicates current Liga ACB player
Italics	Indicates players still playing professional basketball

Rank	Player	Wins
1st	Giorgi Shermadini*	14
2nd	Tanoka Beard	10
3rd	Lou Roe	9
4th	Arvydas Sabonis	7
4th	Ante Tomić*	7
6th	Darryl Middleton	6
7th	Curtis Borchardt	5
7th	Marc Gasol	5
7th	Bernard Hopkins	5
7th	Andy Panko	5
11th	Nik Caner-Medley	4
11th	Justin Doellman	4
11th	Kenny Green	4
11th	Nikola Mirotić	4
11th	Luis Scola	4
11th	Edy Tavares*	4
11th	Marko Todorović	4
18th	Charlie Bell	3
18th	Elmer Bennett	3
18th	Dejan Bodiroga	3
18th	Carl English	3
18th	Rudy Fernández	3
18th	Walter Herrmann	3
18th	Jeff Lamp	3
18th	Pete Mickeal	3
18th	Jean Montero	3
18th	Džanan Musa	3
18th	Gary Neal	3
18th	Velimir Perasović	3
18th	Felipe Reyes	3
18th	Blagota Sekulić	3
18th	Tornike Shengelia	3
33rd	Derrick Alston	2
33rd	Michael Anderson	2
33rd	Gustavo Ayón	2
33rd	Nicolás Brussino*	2
33rd	Ioannis Bourousis	2
33rd	Luka Božić	2
33rd	Ángel Delgado	2
33rd	Bojan Dubljević	2
33rd	Sergio Llull*	2
33rd	Germán Gabriel	2
33rd	Granger Hall	2
33rd	Théo Maledon*	2
33rd	Chris Moss	2
33rd	Fabricio Oberto	2
33rd	Jasiel Rivero*	2
33rd	Reggie Slater	2
33rd	Carlos Suárez	2
33rd	Harper Williams	2

== Awards won by nationality ==
Country	Wins
United States	126
Spain	30
Georgia	18
Argentina	14
Croatia	14
Lithuania	10
Montenegro	10
Dominican Republic	5
France	5
Serbia	5
Canada	4
Cape Verde	4
Bosnia and Herzegovina	3
Greece	3
FR Yugoslavia	3
Cuba	2
Jamaica	2
Mexico	2
Netherlands	2
Nigeria	2
Senegal	2
Slovenia	2
Brazil	1
Bulgaria	1
Czech Republic	1
Croatia	1
Germany	1
Great Britain	1
Poland	1
Portugal	1
Russia	1
Uganda	1
Ukraine	1
Uruguay	1

== Awards won by club ==
Club	Wins
Real Madrid	36
Baskonia	22
Joventut	20
Valencia	20
Fuenlabrada	15
Canarias	16
Barcelona	12
Girona	12
Breogán	11
Real Betis	11
Estudiantes	9
Gran Canaria	8
Granada	8
Murcia	8
Lucentum	6
Valladolid	6
Andorra	6
Zaragoza	6
Bilbao	4
Málaga	4
Manresa	4
Peñas	4
Cáceres	3
Cantabria	3
León	3
Obradoiro	3
Oximesa	3
Fundación CB Granada	2
Gipuzkoa	2
Menorca	2
Burgos	2
Collado Villalba	1
Gijón	1
Lleida	1
Llíria	1
Maristas	1
Ourense	1
Salamanca	1
Tenerife	1
