= List of Liga ACB annual free throw percentage leaders =

In basketball, a free throw is an unopposed attempt to score points from behind the free throw line. The Liga ACB's (Endesa) free throw percentage leader is the player with the highest free throw percentage in a given season.

To qualify as a leader for the free throw percentage, a player must play in at least 75 percent of the total number of possible games, and must make at least 40 free throws the entire season.

== Free throw Percentage leaders ==
Season	Player	Position (Note: The player's primary position is listed first.)	Team	Games played	Free throws made	Free throws attempted	Free throw %	Ref.
1993–94	(Federal Republic of Yugoslavia) Nebojša Ilić	F	Cáceres CB	28	207	230	.9000	
1994–95	(Spain) Alberto Herreros	F	CB Estudiantes	38	212	247	.8563	
1995–96	(Spain) Alberto Herreros (2×)	F	CB Estudiantes	38	171	207	.8261	
1996–97	(Lithuania) Arturas Karnišovas	F	FC Barcelona Bàsquet	33	161	182	.8846	
1997–98	(Spain) Juan Alberto Espil	G/F	TAU Ceramica	34	64	72	.8889	
1998–99	(Argentina) (Italy) Jorge Racca	G	CB Gran Canaria	32	55	62	.8871	
1999–00	(Bosnia and Herzegovina) (Spain) Nenad Marković	G	Pamesa Valencia	34	64	70	.9143	
2000–01	(Spain) Xavi Fernández	G	Canarias Telecom	34	107	119	.8992	
2001–02	(Federal Republic of Yugoslavia) Aleksandar Đorđević	G	Real Madrid Baloncesto	31	120	136	.8824	
2002–03	(Spain) Paco Vazquez	F	Unicaja Málaga	34	76	84	.9048	
2003–04	(Spain) Juan Alberto Espil (2×)	G/F	Baxi Manresa	34	98	104	.9423	
2004–05	(Spain) Juan Alberto Espil (3×)	G/F	Baxi Manresa	34	73	75	.9733	
2005–06	(United States) (Slovenia) Arriel McDonald	G	Girona	33	66	73	.9041	
2006–07	(United States) Louis Bullock	G	Real Madrid Baloncesto	34	126	137	.9197	
2007–08	(United States) Louis Bullock (2×)	G	Real Madrid Baloncesto	30	116	125	.9280	
2008–09	(United States) Chris Thomas	G	UCAM Murcia	N/A	88	93	.9462	
2009–10	(United States) Brian Chase	G	CB Valladolid	31	57	60	.9500	
2010–11	(United States) Jimmy Baron	G	Donosti Gipuzkoa Basket	34	70	71	.9859	
2011–12	(Spain) Alberto Corbacho	G/F	Monbus Obradoiro	33	59	63	.9365	
2012–13	(Spain) Alberto Corbacho (2×)	G/F	Monbus Obradoiro	36	81	86	.9419	
2013–14	(Spain) Alberto Corbacho (3×)	G/F	Monbus Obradoiro	34	51	53	.9623	
2014–15	(Spain) Javi Salgado	G	Movistar Estudiantes	31	43	44	.9773	
2015–16	(Spain) Albert Oliver	G	Herbalife Gran Canaria	31	55	58	.9483	
2016–17	(United States) Jaycee Carroll	G	Real Madrid Baloncesto	34	92	99	.9293	
2017–18	(United States) (Czech Republic) Blake Schilb	G/F	Real Betis Baloncesto	33	43	43	1.0000	
2018–19	(United States) Brian Roberts	G	Unicaja Málaga	34	66	71	.9296	
2019–20 (Note: The number of games played were reduced in this season due to the COVID-19 Pandemic)	(Brazil) Marcelo Huertas	G	CB Lenovo Tenerife	22	53	54	.9815	
2020–21	(Spain) Xabier López-Arostegui	G	Club Joventut Badalona	25	94	97	.9691	
2021–22	(Uruguay) (Italy) Bruno Fitipaldo	G	CB Lenovo Tenerife	34	92	97	.9485	
