= Rod Sellers =

American basketball player (born 1970)

Personal information
- Born: August 7, 1970 (age 56) Florence, South Carolina, U.S.
- Listed height: 2.05 m (6 ft 9 in)
- Listed weight: 107 kg (236 lb)

Career information
- High school: Wilson (Florence, South Carolina)
- College: UConn (1988–1992)
- NBA draft: 1992: undrafted
- Playing career: 1992–2006
- Position: Center

Career history
- 1992–1993: AEK Athens
- 1993–1994: Apollon Patras
- 1994–1997: Cáceres
- 1997–1998: Efes Pilsen
- 1998–1999: Valencia
- 1999–2000: Panionios
- 2000–2001: Virtus Roma
- 2001–2003: Pau-Orthez
- 2003–2004: Olimpia Milano
- 2004–2005: Tenerife
- 2005: Melilla
- 2005–2006: Murcia

Career highlights
- LNB Pro A champion (2003); Semaine des As winner (2003); 2× French Basketball Cup winner (2002–2003); LNB Pro A All-Star (2002); Italian Basketball Supercup winner (2000); FIBA Saporta Cup Finals Top Scorer (1999); Turkish Basketball Cup winner (1998); Liga ACB All-Star (1996); Greek Basket League rebounding leader (1994); Third-team All-Big East (1992)

Walter Roderick Sellers (born August 7, 1970) is an American former professional basketball player. He played at Wilson High School in his native Florence, South Carolina, and played college basketball at UConn, where he was an all-conference performer in his senior year in 1992. After going undrafted in the 1992 NBA draft, Sellers opted not to sign for the Grand Rapids Hoops, which had selected him first overall in the CBA draft, and instead went to Europe, starting his professional career with Greek side AEK Athens. Sellers spent his whole career in Europe, playing in Greece, France, Italy, Spain and Turkey: he appeared in three Euroleague seasons and in 1999 he was the FIBA Saporta Cup Finals Top Scorer. In his 14-year career he has won 1 French league, 2 French cups, 1 Italian Supercup and 1 Semaine des As.

== High school career ==
Sellers was born in Florence, South Carolina: his father died when he was 12, leaving Sellers alone with his brother Patrick, who was one year older than him. Sellers attended Wilson High School in Florence, where he initially played baseball, but after injuring his eye he dedicated himself more to basketball; a member of the varsity team since his sophomore year, in his junior year he was considered among the best players of the team together with his brother, and he was named Conference Tournament MVP. In his senior year Sellers was 6 ft 8 in (2.03 m) tall, and weighed 199 pounds (90 kg); in 27 games he scored 583 points (21.6 average), grabbed 416 rebounds (15.4 per game) and shot 197/314 (62.7%) from the field. He was a second-team all-state selection and he was named 5A Conference Player of the Year.

== College career ==
Sellers was not recruited by major colleges until his junior year; in his senior year his brother was playing at Central Connecticut State and CCSU's coach named Sellers to Howie Dickenman, an assistant coach at UConn. Despite interest from coach Jim Satalin of Duquesne, Sellers signed for UConn in May 1988. In his first year Sellers chose jersey number 22 and he debuted on November 26, 1988 against Hartford, posting 13 points and 12 rebounds: throughout the season he performed inconsistently, and the one against Hartford was the only double double of his season. He played 16.7 minutes per game and averaged 3.8 points, 4.2 rebounds and 0.3 blocks per game while shooting 46.4% from the field. He was second on the team in rebounds per game behind senior Clifford Robinson, and third in blocks behind Robinson and Willie McCloud.

In his sophomore year coach Jim Calhoun promoted Sellers to a full-time starting role, and the center started 35 of his 37 games. On December 9, 1989 Sellers shot 11-for-12 from the field against Maine, for a field goal percentage of 91.7%, which at the time was the best recorded in UConn history. The record has since been surpassed and is the third-best as of 2019. Sellers led the team in blocks (0.8 per game) and in field goal percentage with 53.8% of his shots converted. He was also the fifth-best scorer on the team with 8.2 points per game, and the third-best rebounder with 5.3. In his junior season Sellers had 10 double doubles, the first of which was a 21-point, 10-rebound performance against Hartford on November 27. On January 10, 1991 he recorded a career-high 14 rebounds along with 13 points against Central Connecticut. On February 27, 1991 Sellers scored 21 points and had 12 rebounds against Seton Hall. On March 14, 1991 he had 13 points and 10 rebounds against LSU, battling opposing All-American center Shaquille O'Neal during the 1991 NCAA tournament. Coach Calhoun increased Sellers' minutes to 30.8 in the 1990–91 season, and the center led the team in field goal percentage with 55.4%. Sellers had also increased his scoring average to 11.7 points per game – his first season in double figures – and he was the team's leading rebounder with 8 per game.

In his senior season Sellers started all of his 29 games. He had 17 points and 12 rebounds against Hartford on November 22, 1991, and on February 2, 1992 he scored his 1,000 point in a game against Syracuse. On February 8, 1992 Sellers had 19 rebounds in a game against Seton Hall, which as of 2019 it is tied for most in a single game in UConn history (together with Emeka Okafor's 19 on December 7, 2002). In that game he also scored 17 points. On February 22, 1992 he had a 19-point, 16-rebound double double against Providence, and on March 4 he posted 18 points and 14 rebounds against Syracuse. On March 21, 1992 he recorded his last career double double with 12 points and 13 rebounds in a game against Ohio State during the 1992 NCAA tournament. He was the best rebounder on the team with 8.7 per game, and he led the team in field goal percentage for the third straight season, with 59.2%. Sellers was also the third-best scorer on the team with 12.3 points per game behind Chris Smith and Scott Burrell. That year he was included in the All-Big East Third Team.

He scored a total 1,143 points and started 112 career games, the 7th most for a UConn player as of 2019. He also ranks 19th for most games played with 128, and 7th for highest field goal percentage for a career, with 54.8%.

=== College statistics ===
Year	Team	GP	GS	MPG	FG%	3P%	FT%	RPG	APG	SPG	BPG	PPG
1988–89	UConn	31		16.7	.464	.000	.538	4.2	0.2	0.2	0.3	3.8
1989–90	UConn	37	35	23.1	.538	.000	.524	5.3	0.4	0.7	0.8	8.2
1990–91	UConn	31		30.8	.554	.000	.570	8.0	1.1	1.0	0.9	11.7
1991–92	UConn	29	29	31.7	.592	.000	.663	8.7	1.4	0.6	0.4	12.3
Career		128	112	25.4	.548	.000	.587	6.4	0.8	0.7	0.6	8.9

== Professional career ==
After the end of his senior season at UConn, Sellers was automatically eligible for the 1992 NBA draft, but he went undrafted. After contacts with the New Haven Skyhawks of the United States Basketball League, Sellers participated in training camp with the Washington Bullets in the summer of 1992. In August 1992 he was the first overall pick of the Continental Basketball Association (CBA) draft, selected by the Grand Rapids Hoops. Sellers stayed with the Bullets for the preseason training, but he was waived in late October, just before the start of the 1992–93 NBA season, together with Reggie Cross. Instead of joining a CBA team, Sellers opted to go overseas and signed for AEK B.C. of Athens, Greece, and started his professional career there. At AEK he replaced Miloš Babić, joining the team during Week 9 of the 1992–93 Greek Basket League season.

Sellers joined Apollon Patras B.C. the following season, and was named the regular season rebounding leader after averaging 14.3 rebounds per game. After the end of the 1993–94 season Sellers joined Spanish side Cáceres CB of the Liga ACB. In the 1994–95 ACB season Sellers averaged 15.9 points and 8.9 rebounds per game while shooting 58.2% from the field. The team also reached the semifinals in the 1994–95 FIBA Korać Cup. For the following season Sellers improved his averages to 17.3 points and 9.9 rebounds per game, posting several double doubles and earning the ACB Player of the Month Award in September 1995. He was also selected for the ACB All-Star game in 1996. In the 1996–97 ACB season Sellers averaged 16.8 points and 9.4 rebounds, being named Player of the Week on Week 2. During the 1997 Copa del Rey de Baloncesto Cáceres reached the finals, where they lost to Joventut Badalona despite Sellers' 23 points in the final game.

In 1997 Sellers left Spain for Turkey, and signed a contract Efes Pilsen. This marked his debut in the EuroLeague, participating in the 1997–98 edition. In the domestic league he averaged 11.3 points and 7.9 rebounds over 16 appearances (26.8 minutes of average playing time). After the stint in Turkey Sellers went back to Spain and signed for Valencia Basket, at the time known as Pamesa Cerámica for sponsorship reasons, and replaced Nigerian player Ime Oduok. In the 1998–99 ACB season Sellers played 31 games, with averages of 13.6 points and 7.5 rebounds per game. In 1999 he joined Panionios B.C., and spent another season in Greece.

In 2000 he signed for Pallacanestro Virtus Roma, and played one season in Serie A in Italy: he improved his averages to 15.8 points and 8.6 rebounds in 34 minutes of playing time, while recording a career high 2 steals per game. In 2001 Sellers joined French team Élan Béarnais Pau-Orthez. He played 27 games in the LNB Pro A, posting 14.1 points and 6.9 rebounds, shooting 55.8% from the field; he also appeared in 14 games during the 2001–02 Euroleague, and averaged 14.9 points and 6.5 rebounds. His team won the French Basketball Cup that year, and he was selected for the All-Star game. The 2002–03 season was the most successful at team level for Sellers: he won the LNB Pro A title, the Semaine des As, and his second consecutive French Cup. He again took part in the Euroleague, and in the 2002–03 edition he scored 16.6 points per game and had 5.5 rebounds per game. In 29 Pro A games, Sellers averaged 14.3 points while playing 23.8 minutes per game.

After winning three trophies in the 2002–03 season, Sellers left France, and returned to Italy for the second time in his career, signing with Olimpia Milano, then known as Breil Milano for sponsorship reasons. He appeared in the 2003–04 Lega Basket Serie A and in the 2003–04 ULEB Cup, his last appearance at international level. He averaged 11 points per game in both competitions, playing 27.2 minutes in Serie A and 30.4 in the ULEB Cup. In 2004 he joined Tenerife CB, and participated in the 2004–05 ACB season. In 2005 he played for Club Melilla Baloncesto in the second level of Spanish basketball, and he retired in 2006 after a season with Murcia.
