= 1997 Copa del Rey de Baloncesto =

Basketball tournament in 1997

The 1997 Copa del Rey was the 61st edition of the Spanish basketball Cup. It was organized by the ACB and was played in León in the Palacio de los Deportes between January 31 and February 3, 1997. Joventut Badalona won its seventh title after overcoming 17 points against Cáceres CB, which played its first final.

== Bracket ==
| Quarterfinals; January 31, February 1 | | Semifinals; February 2 | | Final; February 3 |
| FC Barcelona Banca Catalana (3 OT) | 115 |
| Real Madrid Teka | 110 | FC Barcelona Banca Catalana | 88 |
| Adecco Estudiantes | 81 | Cáceres CB | 94 |
| Cáceres CB | 88 | | | Cáceres CB | 71 |
| León Caja España | 88 | | | Festina Joventut | 79 |
| TDK Manresa | 85 | León Caja España | 72 |
| Caja San Fernando | 88 | Festina Joventut | 80 |
| Festina Joventut | 97 |

== Final ==
3 February 1997
20:30 GTM+1

Boxscore

| Cáceres CB | 71–79 | Festina Joventut |
Scoring by half: 47–34, 24–45
| Pts: Sellers 23; Rebs: Paraíso 7 Asts: Jackson 5 PIR: Sellers 24 | | Pts: Toolson 21; Rebs: Beard 11; Asts: Turner 8 PIR: Turner 26 |

Palacio de los Deportes, León
Attendance: 6,500
Referees: Betancor, Martín Bertrán, Hierrezuelo

Copa del Rey 1997 Champions

Joventut Badalona
7th title

- MVP of the Tournament: Andre Turner
