= Chris Moss =

American basketball player (born 1980

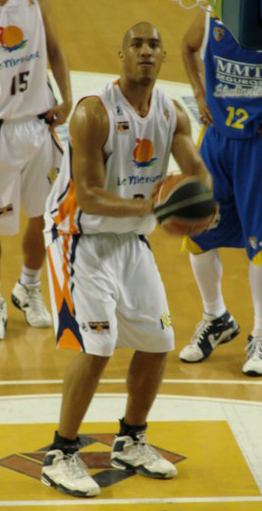

Personal information
- Born: February 7, 1980 (age 46) Columbus, Georgia, U.S.
- Listed height: 6 ft 9 in (2.06 m)
- Listed weight: 240 lb (109 kg)

Career information
- College: West Virginia (1997–2001)
- NBA draft: 2002: undrafted
- Playing career: 2002–2017
- Position: Power forward

Career history
- 2001–2002: Ironi Nahariya
- 2002–2003: AS Golbey Epinal
- 2003–2008: Menorca Bàsquet
- 2008–2010: CB Murcia
- 2010–2011: Deutsche Bank Skyliners
- 2011–2013: Toshiba Brave Thunders
- 2013: Club Biguá
- 2013–2014: Wonju Dongbu Promy
- 2014: Atlético Aguada
- 2015–2017: Peñarol Mar del Plata

Christopher Vashon Moss (born February 7, 1980) is an American former professional basketball player, who played the power forward position. He played for many teams overseas, including Deutsche Bank Skyliners, but has spent time in Israel, Spain, France, Japan, Puerto Rico, and Argentina as well.

== Clubs ==
- West Virginia University - NCAA (USA) - 1998/2001
- Hapoel Ironi Nahariya - BSL (Israel) - 2001/2002
- AS Golbey Epinal - Pro B (France) - 2002/2003
- Menorca Bàsquet - LEB (Spain) - 2003/2005
- ViveMenorca - ACB (Spain) - 2005/2008
- CB Murcia - ACB (Spain) - 2008/2010
- Deutsche Bank Skyliners - Basketball Bundesliga (Germany) - 2011/present

== Honors ==
Individual honors for club

- ACB League's MVP of the Month - May 2007
- ACB League's MVP of the Month - October 2007

== Career statistics ==
Correct as of 23 June 2007

| Season | Team | League | GP | MPG | RPG | APG | PPG |
|---|---|---|---|---|---|---|---|
| 2005-06 | Menorca | ACB | 26 | 32 | 7.3 | 0.5 | 14 |
| 2006-07 | Menorca | ACB | 34 | 30 | 7 | 0.8 | 13.4 |
