= Derrick Alston =

American basketball player (born 1972)

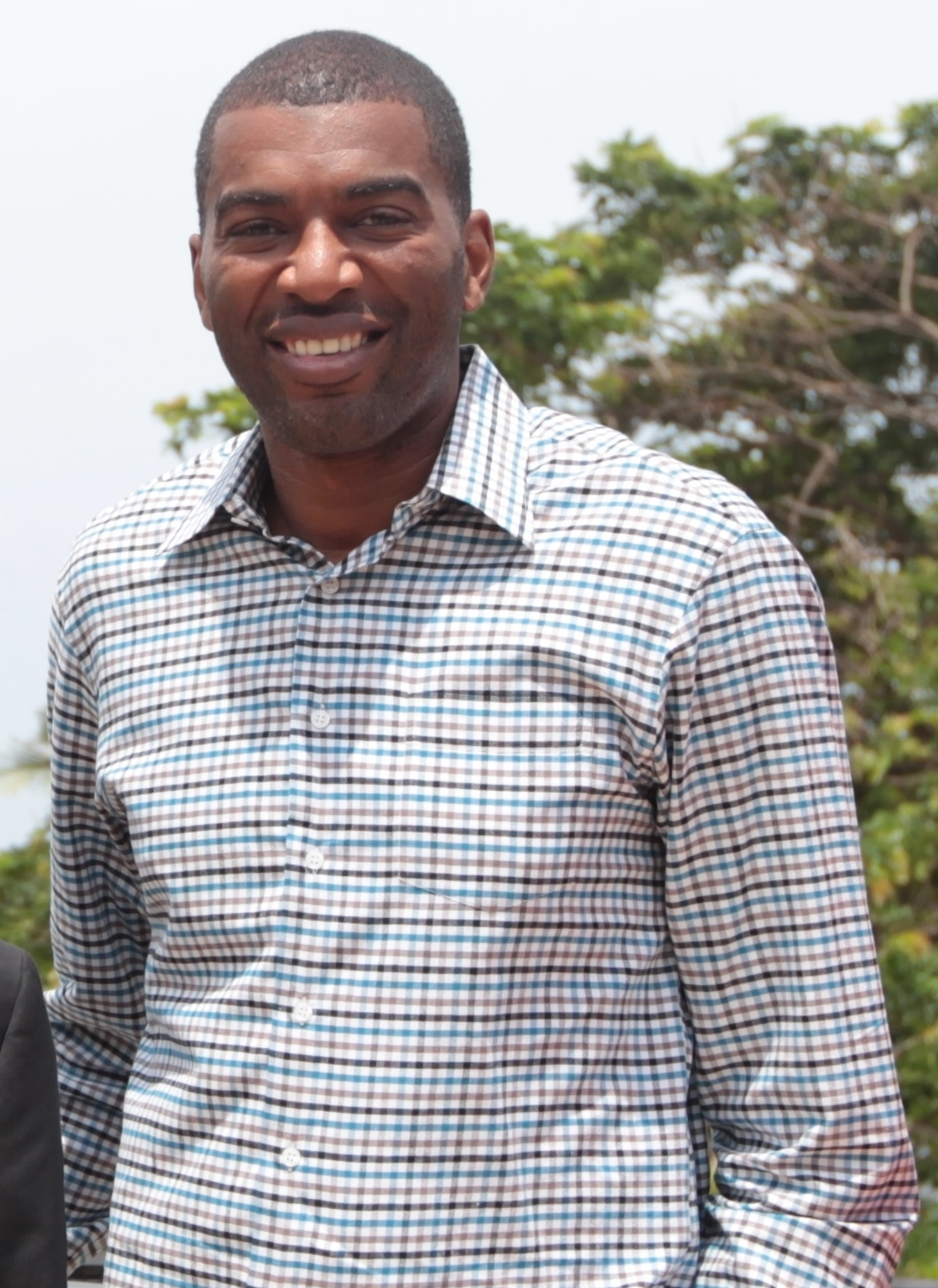
- Alston in 2014

Perth Wildcats
- Title: Assistant coach
- League: NBL

Personal information
- Born: August 20, 1972 (age 54) The Bronx, New York, U.S.
- Listed height: 6 ft 10 in (2.08 m)
- Listed weight: 225 lb (102 kg)

Career information
- High school: Hoboken (Hoboken, New Jersey)
- College: Duquesne (1990–1994)
- NBA draft: 1994: 2nd round, 33rd overall pick
- Drafted by: Philadelphia 76ers
- Playing career: 1994–2012
- Position: Power forward / center
- Number: 21, 45
- Coaching career: 2012–present

Career history

Playing
- 1994–1996: Philadelphia 76ers
- 1996: Atlanta Hawks
- 1996–1997: Efes Pilsen
- 1997–1998: TDK Manresa
- 1998–2000: FC Barcelona
- 2000–2002: Pamesa Valencia
- 2002–2003: Real Madrid
- 2003–2005: Lleida
- 2005–2006: BCM Gravelines
- 2006: Ural Great Perm
- 2006–2007: Türk Telekom
- 2007–2008: New Zealand Breakers
- 2008–2009: Libertad de Sunchales
- 2009–2010: Boca Juniors
- 2010: La Unión de Formosa
- 2011–2012: Boca Juniors

Coaching
- 2012–2015: Houston Rockets (assistant)
- 2015–2019: Westchester Knicks (assistant)
- 2019–2022: Westchester Knicks
- 2022–2023: College Park Skyhawks (assistant)
- 2023–2025: Montreal Alliance
- 2024: Pioneros de Los Mochis
- 2024–2026: Wisconsin Herd (assistant)
- 2026–present: Perth Wildcats (assistant)

Career highlights
- Spanish League champion (1999); Spanish League Finals MVP (1999); First-team All-Atlantic 10 (1994)
- Stats at NBA.com
- Stats at Basketball Reference

Derrick Samuel Alston Sr. (born August 20, 1972) is an American basketball coach and former player who serves as an assistant coach for the Perth Wildcats of the Australian National Basketball League (NBL).

== Early life ==
Born in The Bronx, New York, Alston played basketball at Hoboken High School in Hoboken, New Jersey.

== Professional career ==
Alston, a power forward/center from Duquesne University, started off his professional career when he was selected 33rd overall in the 1994 NBA draft by the Philadelphia 76ers for whom he played two seasons. He then played 2 games for the Atlanta Hawks in late 1996 before taking his game overseas.

Joining the New Zealand Breakers mid-season 2007–08, Alston made an immediate impact. Statwise, he reached the top 20 in the league for FG%, shooting at 56.0%, and offensive rebounds, while averaging 13.8 ppg and being instrumental in helping the Breakers reach the playoffs for the first time in club history.

== Career statistics ==
Legend
GP	Games played	GS	Games started	MPG	Minutes per game
FG%	Field goal percentage	3P%	3-point field goal percentage	FT%	Free throw percentage
RPG	Rebounds per game	APG	Assists per game	SPG	Steals per game
BPG	Blocks per game	PPG	Points per game	**Bold**	Career high

=== NBA ===
Year	Team	GP	GS	MPG	FG%	3P%	FT%	RPG	APG	SPG	BPG	PPG
1994–95	Philadelphia	64	1	16.1	.465	.000	**.492**	3.4	0.5	0.6	0.5	4.7
1995–96	Philadelphia	**73**	**41**	**22.1**	**.512**	**.333**	.491	**4.1**	**0.8**	**0.8**	**0.7**	**6.2**
1996–97	Atlanta	2	0	5.5	.000	.000	.000	2.0	0.0	0.0	0.0	0.0
Career		139	42	19.1	.489	.143	.487	3.8	0.7	0.7	0.6	5.4

=== College ===
Year	Team	GP	GS	MPG	FG%	3P%	FT%	RPG	APG	SPG	BPG	PPG
1990–91	Duquesne	28	25	28.8	.536	.000	.598	6.3	1.3	0.8	1.9	11.3
1991–92	Duquesne	28	-	32.8	.556	.000	.526	8.0	**1.5**	1.2	**2.1**	13.9
1992–93	Duquesne	28	**27**	34.3	.563	**1.000**	.574	**9.3**	1.1	1.4	**2.1**	19.9
1993–94	Duquesne	**30**	-	**36.0**	**.578**	.000	**.601**	7.3	1.4	**1.6**	1.8	**21.3**
Career		114	52	33.0	.561	.333	.576	7.7	1.3	1.2	2.0	16.7

== Coaching career ==
After retiring, in 2012, Alston joined the staff of the Houston Rockets and served as their Player Development Coach for two seasons 2012–2015. On October 27, 2015, he was hired by the Westchester Knicks to be an assistant coach.

In August 2014, Alston traveled to the Philippines as a SportsUnited Sports Envoy for the U.S. Department of State. In this function, he worked with Alison Feaster and Erik Spoelstra to conduct basketball clinics and events for more than 375 youth from underserved areas. In so doing, Alston helped contribute to SportsUnited's mission to advance the status of women and girls around the world and to show support to an important regional partner.

In August 2019, he was named head coach of the Westchester Knicks of the NBA G League. He held the head coaching position until the end of the 2021–22 season. On October 25, 2022, Alston was named an assistant coach of the NBA G League's College Park Skyhawks.

In February 2023, Alston became the second head coach of the Montreal Alliance of the Canadian Elite Basketball League (CEBL).

In November 2023, Alston was named head coach of the Pioneros de Los Mochis of the Circuito de Baloncesto de la Costa del Pacífico (CIBACOPA) ahead of the 2024 season.

On November 1, 2024, Alston became an assistant coach for the Wisconsin Herd.

On July 3, 2026, Alston was appointed assistant coach of the Perth Wildcats of the Australian National Basketball League (NBL) for the 2026–27 season.

== Personal life ==
Alston's son Derrick Alston Jr. was a college basketball player at Boise State, before embarking on a career in professional basketball. Alston also has a daughter named Avery.
