= CB Salamanca =

Basketball team in Salamanca, Spain

Club Baloncesto Salamanca
- Founded: 1993
- Dissolved: 1996
- Arena: Pabellón de Wurzburg (capacity: 5,000)
- Location: Salamanca, Castile and Lion
- Team colors: Orange and navy
Home	Away

Club Baloncesto Salamanca was a professional basketball club based in Salamanca, Spain.

== History ==
CB Salamanca was founded in 1993 after buying the spot in 1ª División (Spanish second league) to Askatuak SBT. On its first year, the team promoted to Liga ACB as runner-up of the league.

Salamanca played two season in Liga ACB. In the first one, 1994–95, the team finished in the 16th position and in the second one was 9th and qualified to play the Korać Cup. Due to financial problems, in summer 1996 CB Salamanca sold its berths of Liga ACB and Korać Cup to CB Granada and the team was dissolved.

== Season by season ==
Season	Tier	Division	Pos.	W–L
1993–94	2	1ª División	2nd	27–14
1994–95	1	Liga ACB	16th	17–21
1995–96	1	Liga ACB	9th (Note: Sold the ACB and the Korać Cup berths to CB Granada.)	19–19

== Honours ==
- Liga de Verano ACB: 1995

== Notable players ==
- (Spain) Rafael Vecina
- (Spain) Federico Ramiro
- (United States) Kenny Atkinson
- (United States) Granger Hall
- (United States) Perry Carter
- (United States) Jimmy Oliver
- (United States) Jeff Sanders
- (United States) Jeff Martin
