= Lou Roe =

American basketball player (born 1972)

Personal information
- Born: July 14, 1972 (age 54) Atlantic City, New Jersey, U.S.
- Listed height: 6 ft 7 in (2.01 m)
- Listed weight: 220 lb (100 kg)

Career information
- High school: Atlantic City (Atlantic City, New Jersey)
- College: UMass (1991–1995)
- NBA draft: 1995: 2nd round, 30th overall pick
- Drafted by: Detroit Pistons
- Playing career: 1995–2012
- Position: Power forward
- Number: 3, 21

Career history
- 1995–1996: Detroit Pistons
- 1996–1997: Golden State Warriors
- 1997–1998: Málaga
- 1998: Rockford Lightning
- 1998–1999: Cantù
- 1999–2000: Quad City Thunder
- 2000: Inca
- 2000–2002: Gijón
- 2002–2004: Lucentum Alicante
- 2004–2006: Caja San Fernando
- 2006–2007: Seoul Knights
- 2007: Palma
- 2007: Baskonia
- 2007–2008: Palma
- 2008: Murcia
- 2008–2009: Gipuzkoa
- 2009–2010: Tenerife
- 2010–2011: Halcones Xalapa
- 2011–2012: Regatas Corrientes

Career highlights
- 2× Spanish League Top Scorer (2004, 2006); Spanish League MVP (2001); All-Spanish League Team (2004); Consensus second-team All-American (1995); Third-team All-American – NABC (1994); Atlantic 10 Player of the Year (1995); 3× First-team All-Atlantic 10 (1993–1995); No. 15 retired by UMass Minutemen
- Stats at NBA.com
- Stats at Basketball Reference
Medals
Men's basketball
Representing United States
Goodwill Games
Bronze medal – third place	1994 St. Petersburg	National team

Louis Marquel Roe (born July 14, 1972) is an American former professional basketball player who played in the National Basketball Association (NBA) and the Spanish Liga ACB, among other leagues. He was an All-American college player for the UMass Minutemen.

== College playing career ==
Roe played college basketball for the UMass Minutemen, where in 1995, he was the Atlantic 10 Player of the Year, and a consensus second-team All-American.

== Professional playing career ==
Roe was selected by the Detroit Pistons, in the second round (30th pick overall) of the 1995 NBA draft. Roe played in two NBA seasons with the Pistons and Golden State Warriors. In his brief NBA career, he appeared in 66 games, and scored a total of 130 points.

After his NBA career wound up, Roe played professionally in Spain, the Continental Basketball Association (CBA), Italy, South Korea, Mexico and Argentina.

== Post-playing career ==
Roe was working with his alma mater's men's team in an administrative role, assisting his former UMass teammate and former head coach, Derek Kellogg. In January 2021, Roe was named head coach of the Putnam Vocational Technical Academy in Springfield, Massachusetts.

== Education ==
Lou Roe is an undergraduate student at the University of Massachusetts Amherst through the University Without Walls program.

== Honors ==
- Spanish League MVP: (2001)
- 2× Spanish League Top Scorer: (2004, 2006)
