= 2007–08 ACB season =

2007-08 ACB season
- League: Asociación de Clubs de Baloncesto
- Sport: Basketball
- Duration: October 6, 2007 - June 3, 2008
- TV partner: Televisión Española

Regular Season
- Season champions: Real Madrid
- Season MVP: (Spain) Marc Gasol (Girona)
- Top scorer: (Spain) Rudy Fernández (Joventut)

Playoffs

Finals
- Champions: Tau Cerámica
- Runners-up: Barça
- Finals MVP: (United States) Pete Mickeal (Tau)

ACB seasons
- ← 2006-07 2008-09 →

The 2007–08 ACB season was the 25th season of the Asociación de Clubs de Baloncesto. The 612-game regular season (34 games for each of the 18 teams) began on Saturday, October 6, 2007, and ended on Friday, May 9, 2008. The ACB playoffs started on Thursday, May 15, 2008 and ran until Tuesday, June 3, 2008.

TAU Cerámica won the Final series by 3-0 against AXA FC Barcelona and obtained their second ACB championship.

Some changes were introduced in this ACB season:

- First place in the Regular Season granted direct access to the following Euroleague season
- Playoffs' Quarterfinal and Semifinal series were 3-match rounds instead of 5-match rounds

== Team standings ==
Direct access to Euroleague 2008-09
Clinched playoff berth
Eliminated from playoffs contention
Relegated

Asociación de Clubs de Baloncesto
Teams	Pld	W	L	PF	PA	Diff
Real Madrid	34	29	5	2862	2572	+290
DKV Joventut	34	25	9	2980	2650	+330
AXA FC Barcelona	34	24	10	2617	2524	+93
TAU Cerámica	34	22	12	2867	2604	+263
Pamesa Valencia	34	22	12	2706	2520	+186
Iurbentia Bilbao	34	21	13	2597	2507	+90
Akasvayu Girona	34	21	13	2726	2685	+41
Unicaja Málaga	34	17	17	2721	2648	+73
Kalise Gran Canaria	34	16	18	2682	2689	-7
Cajasol Sevilla	34	14	20	2701	2764	-63
Ricoh Manresa	34	14	20	2715	2817	-102
Polaris World Murcia	34	13	21	2491	2634	-143
Alta Gestión Fuenlabrada	34	13	21	2542	2671	-129
MMT Estudiantes	34	12	22	2561	2694	-133
CB Granada	34	12	22	2629	2761	-132
ViveMenorca	34	12	22	2567	2755	-188
Grupo Capitol Valladolid	34	11	23	2685	2887	-202
Grupo Begar León	34	8	26	2571	2838	-267

|}

=== Summary ===
- Will participate in the Euroleague 2008-09:
  - TAU Vitoria, Unicaja Málaga, Real Madrid, F.C. Barcelona and DKV Joventut Badalona.
- Will participate in the ULEB Cup 2008-09:
  - Pamesa Valencia, Iurbentia Bilbao Basket, Akasvayu Girona and Kalise Gran Canaria.
- Will play in the Liga LEB:
  - Grupo Capitol Valladolid and Grupo Begar León.
- Will play in the 2008–2009 ACB season:
  - CAI Zaragoza and Bruesa GBC.

== Stats Leaders ==
Stats as of May 31, 2008

=== Points ===
Rank	Name	Team	Games	Points	PPG
1.	(Spain) Rudy Fernández	DKV Joventut	35	731	20.9
2.	(France) Joseph Gomis	Grupo Capitol Valladolid	34	612	18
3.	(Spain) Marc Gasol	Akasvayu Girona	37	613	16.6
4.	(United States) Ruben Douglas	Pamesa Valencia	37	611	16.5
5.	(Canada) Carl English	Kalise Gran Canaria	34	517	15.2

=== Rebounds ===
Rank	Name	Team	Games	Rebounds	RPG
1.	(Spain) Marc Gasol	Akasvayu Girona	37	311	8.4
2.	(France) Frédéric Weis	Iurbentia Bilbao	30	212	7.1
3.	(Spain) Felipe Reyes	Real Madrid	31	211	6.8
4.	(United States) Pete Mickeal	TAU Cerámica	32	197	6.1
5.	(United States) Chris Moss	Vive Menorca	34	209	6.1

=== Assists ===
Rank	Name	Team	Games	Assists	APG
1.	(Spain) Javier Rodríguez	Ricoh Manresa	34	182	5.3
2.	(Argentina) Juan Ignacio Sánchez	AXA FC Barcelona	40	202	5
3.	(United States) Shammond Williams	Pamesa Valencia	34	170	5
4.	(Argentina) Pablo Prigioni	TAU Cerámica	41	175	4.3
5.	(Spain) Víctor Sada	Akasvayu Girona	37	157	4.2

=== MVP Week by Week ===
Date	Player	Team	Efficiency
1	(Slovenia) Jaka Lakovič	AXA FC Barcelona	35
2	(Spain) Marc Gasol	Akasvayu Girona	38
3	(United States) Tom Wideman	Alta Gestión Fuenlabrada	37
4	(United States) Matt Walsh	Ricoh Manresa	32
5	(Slovenia) Jaka Lakovič (2)	AXA FC Barcelona (2)	36
6	(Spain) Marc Gasol (2)	Akasvayu Girona (2)	37
7	(United States) Charles Smith	Real Madrid	36
8	(Spain) Marc Gasol (3)	Akasvayu Girona (3)	38
9	(France) Florent Piétrus	MMT Estudiantes	38
10	(Spain) Marc Gasol (4)	Akasvayu Girona (4)	33
11	(United States) Curtis Borchardt	CB Granada	36
12	(Serbia) Branko Cvetković	Akasvayu Girona (5)	31
13	(United States) Rick Hughes	Grupo Begar León	46
14	(Spain) Rudy Fernández	DKV Joventut	39
15	(Spain) Rudy Fernández (2)	DKV Joventut (2)	34
16	(Spain) Salva Guardia	Alta Gestión Fuenlabrada (2)	34
17	(Spain) Rudy Fernández (3)	DKV Joventut (3)	37
18	(Spain) Rudy Fernández (4)	DKV Joventut (4)	42
19	(Spain) Marc Gasol (5)	Akasvayu Girona (6)	44
20	(United States) Nik Caner-Medley	Kalise Gran Canaria	28
21	(United States) Rick Hughes (2) (Puerto Rico) Daniel Santiago	Grupo Begar León (2); Unicaja	35
22	(Spain) Marc Gasol (6)	Akasvayu Girona (7)	37
23	(Spain) Felipe Reyes	Real Madrid (2)	32
24	(Spain) Marc Gasol (7)	Akasvayu Girona (8)	43
25	(United States) Tom Wideman (2)	Alta Gestión Fuenlabrada (3)	42
26	(Spain) Marc Gasol (8)	Akasvayu Girona (9)	38
27	(Spain) Felipe Reyes (2)	Real Madrid (3)	38
28	(Croatia) Marko Tomas	Alta Gestión Fuenlabrada (4)	37
29	(Spain) Rudy Fernández (5)	DKV Joventut (5)	35
30	(United States) Josh Asselin	Ricoh Manresa (2)	39
31	(Spain) Marc Gasol (9)	Akasvayu Girona (10)	38
32	(Spain) Marc Gasol (10)	Akasvayu Girona (11)	33
33	(Spain) Rudy Fernández (6)	DKV Joventut (6)	37
34	(Spain) Marc Gasol (11)	Akasvayu Girona (12)	34

=== All-ACB Team ===
Position	Player	Team
PG	(Brazil) Marcelinho Huertas	iurbentia Bilbao
PG	(Spain) Ricky Rubio	DKV Joventut
SF	(Spain) Rudy Fernández	DKV Joventut
C	(Spain) Marc Gasol	Akasvayu Girona
C	(Spain) Felipe Reyes	Real Madrid
