= Cantabria Baloncesto =

Alerta Cantabria
- Founded: 1975
- History: 1975-2009
- Arena: Palacio de los Deportes de Santander
- Location: Santander, Cantabria; 2004-2009; Torrelavega, Cantabria; 1975-2004
- Team colors: Black
- President: Isaías Díaz
- Head coach: Mateo Rubio
- Championships: 1 Copa Príncipe; 1 LEB Bronce Championship; 1 Copa LEB Bronce
- Website: www.basketlobos.com
Home	Away

Cantabria Baloncesto was a professional basketball team who played during five seasons in Liga ACB. The team was also known as Cantabria Lobos.

From 1975 to 2004 the team was based and played in Torrelavega, but after the 2003-04 season the Cantabria Lobos moved to Santander, Cantabria.

In 2008, the team renounced their spot in the LEB Oro and played in LEB Bronce. After that season, Cantabria Baloncesto ceased in activity but was not dissolved.

== Season by season ==
Season	Tier	Division	Pos.	W–L	Other cups	
1992–93	2	1ª División	15th	21–15		
1993–94	2	1ª División	18th	4–26		
1994–95	2	Liga EBA	5th	21–15		
1995–96	2	Liga EBA	3rd	23–7		
1996–97	2	LEB	2nd	25–13	Copa Príncipe	C
1997–98	1	Liga ACB	14th	12–22		
1998–99	1	Liga ACB	15th	13–21		
1999–00	1	Liga ACB	14th	11–23		
2000–01	1	Liga ACB	16th	10–24		
2001–02	1	Liga ACB	17th	7–27		
2002–03	2	LEB	7th	18–17		
2003–04	2	LEB	11th	16–18		
2004–05	2	LEB	13th	14–20		
2005–06	2	LEB	9th	17–17		
2006–07	2	LEB	5th	24–14	Copa Príncipe	RU
2007–08	2	LEB Oro	15th (Note: Resigned its place in LEB Oro.)	12–22		
2008–09	4	LEB Bronce	1st	21–9	Copa LEB Bronce	C
2009–	Did not enter any competition					

== Trophies and awards ==
=== Trophies ===
- Copa Príncipe de Asturias: (1)
  - 1997
- LEB Bronce: (1)
  - 2009
- Copa LEB Bronce: (1)
  - 2009

=== Individual awards ===
LEB Oro MVP

- Bob Harstad – 1997

== Notable players ==
- (Spain) Joaquín Ruiz Lorente
- (Italy) Mario Boni
- (United States) Bob Harstad
- (United States) Mike Iuzzolino
- (United States) Marc Jackson
- (United States Virgin Islands) Cuthbert Victor
- (Brazil) Marcelinho Machado
