= 1999–2000 ACB season =

1999-00 ACB season
- League: Liga ACB
- Sport: Basketball
- Games: 340
- Teams: 18
- TV partner: Canal+

Regular Season
- Season champions: Real Madrid
- Season MVP: (United States) Darryl Middleton (Casademont Girona)

Playoffs

ACB Finals
- Champions: Real Madrid
- Runners-up: FC Barcelona
- Finals MVP: (Spain) Alberto Angulo (Real Madrid)

ACB seasons
- ← 1998–99 2000–01 →

The 1999–2000 ACB season was the 18th season of the Liga ACB.

== Regular season ==
Pos	Equipo	J	G	P	PF	PC	Qualification or relegation
1	FC Barcelona	34	26	8	2545	2234	Playoffs
2	Real Madrid	34	23	11	2561	2335	Playoffs
3	Adecco Estudiantes	34	23	11	2507	2376	Playoffs
4	Caja San Fernando	34	22	12	2402	2297	Playoffs
5	TAU Cerámica	34	21	13	2696	2500	Playoffs
6	Pamesa Valencia	34	20	14	2703	2528	Playoffs
7	Canarias Telecom	34	19	15	2435	2479	Playoffs
8	Unicaja Málaga	34	19	15	2412	2370	Playoffs
9	Cáceres CB	34	17	17	2450	2467	
10	Casademont Girona	34	16	18	2523	2473	
11	Pinturas Bruguer Badalona	34	16	18	2640	2650	
12	Fórum Valladolid CB	34	15	19	2342	2444	
13	Breogán Universidade	34	15	19	2432	2522	
14	Jabones Pardo Fuenlabrada	34	11	23	2471	2563	
15	Cantabria Lobos	34	11	23	2345	2619	
16	Cabitel Gijón Baloncesto	34	11	23	2332	2570	
17	TDK Manresa	34	11	23	2336	2487	Relegated to LEB
18	León Caja España	34	10	24	2296	2514	Relegated to LEB

== Playoffs ==
Quarter Finals
1	FC Barcelona	3
8	Unicaja Málaga	2
4	Caja San Fernando	2
5	Tau Cerámica	3
2	Real Madrid	3
7	Canarias Telecom	0
3	Adecco Estudiantes	3
6	Pamesa Valencia	0

SemiFinals
1	FC Barcelona	3
5	Tau Cerámica	1
2	Real Madrid	3
3	Adecco Estudiantes	2

Finals
1	FC Barcelona	2
2	Real Madrid	3

1999-2000 ACB League
Real Madrid
28th Title

== See also ==
- Liga ACB
