= 1996–97 ACB season =

1996-97 ACB season
- League: Liga ACB
- Sport: Basketball
- Games: 340
- Teams: 18
- TV partner: Televisión Española

Regular Season
- Season champions: Real Madrid Teka
- Season MVP: (United States) Kenny Green (Tau Cerámica)

Playoffs

ACB Finals
- Champions: FC Barcelona Banca Catalana
- Runners-up: Real Madrid Teka
- Finals MVP: (Spain) Roberto Dueñas (FC Barcelona Banca Catalana)

ACB seasons
- ← 1995–96 1997–98 →

The 1996–97 ACB season was the 16th season of the Liga ACB.

== Regular season ==
Pos	Team	J	G	P	PF	PC	Qualification
1	Real Madrid Teka	34	29	5	2918	2582	Championship Playoffs
2	FC Barcelona Banca Catalana	34	27	7	2962	2643	Championship Playoffs
3	Estudiantes Argentaria	34	21	13	2804	2725	Championship Playoffs
4	Festina Joventut	34	21	13	2864	2703	Championship Playoffs
5	Taugrés	34	20	14	2831	2710	Championship Playoffs
6	León Caja España	34	20	14	2819	2824	Championship Playoffs
7	Unicaja Málaga	34	19	15	2699	2611	Championship Playoffs
8	TDK Manresa	34	19	15	2666	2538	Championship Playoffs
9	Caja San Fernando	34	19	15	2724	2693	
10	Cáceres CB	34	18	16	2812	2757	
11	Pamesa Valencia	34	17	17	2763	2797	
12	CB Gran Canaria	34	17	17	2748	2717	
13	Covirán Granada	34	14	20	2881	2961	
14	Valvi Girona	34	14	20	2521	2685	
15	Fórum Valladolid	34	12	22	2738	2875	Relegation playoffs
16	Xacobeo 99 Ourense	34	10	24	2568	2774	Relegation playoffs
17	CB Murcia Airtel	34	5	29	2588	2913	Relegation playoffs
18	Baloncesto Fuenlabrada	34	4	30	2527	2922	Relegation playoffs

== Relegation playoffs ==
Finals
15	Fórum Valladolid	3
18	Fuenlabrada	0

Finals
16	Xacobeo 99 Ourense	3
17	CB Murcia Artel	1

CB Murcia Artel and Fuenlabrada, relegated to LEB.

== Championship Playoffs ==
Quarter Finals
1	Real Madrid Teka	3
8	TDK Manresa	0
4	Festina Joventut	3
5	Taugrés	1
2	FC Barcelona Banca Catalana	3
7	Unicaja Málaga	2
3	Adecco Estudiantes	3
6	León Caja España	1

SemiFinals
1	Real Madrid Teka	3
4	Festina Joventut	0
2	FC Barcelona Banca Catalana	3
3	Adecco Estudiantes	1

Finals
1	Real Madrid Teka	2
2	FC Barcelona Banca Catalana	3

1996-97 ACB League
FC Barcelona Banca Catalana
10th Title

== See also ==
- Liga ACB
