= 1998–99 ACB season =

1998-99 ACB season
- League: Liga ACB
- Sport: Basketball
- Games: 340
- Teams: 18
- TV partner: Televisión Española

Regular Season
- Season champions: FC Barcelona Banca Catalana
- Season MVP: (United States) Tanoka Beard (Real Madrid Teka)

Playoffs

ACB Finals
- Champions: FC Barcelona Banca Catalana
- Runners-up: Caja San Fernando
- Finals MVP: (United States) Derrick Alston (FC Barcelona Banca Catalana)

ACB seasons
- ← 1997–98 1999–00 →

The 1998-1999 ACB season was the 17th season of the Liga ACB.

== Regular season ==
| Pos | Equipo | J | G | P | PF | PC | Qualification or relegation |
|---|---|---|---|---|---|---|---|
| 1 | FC Barcelona Banca Catalana | 34 | 26 | 8 | 2885 | 2543 | Qualification to playoffs |
| 2 | Real Madrid Teka | 34 | 26 | 8 | 2768 | 2524 | Qualification to playoffs |
| 3 | Caja San Fernando | 34 | 25 | 9 | 2488 | 2366 | Qualification to playoffs |
| 4 | TAU Cerámica | 34 | 24 | 10 | 2712 | 2576 | Qualification to playoffs |
| 5 | Adecco Estudiantes | 34 | 21 | 13 | 2791 | 2652 | Qualification to playoffs |
| 6 | Pamesa Cerámica | 34 | 18 | 16 | 2600 | 2565 | Qualification to playoffs |
| 7 | Baloncesto Fuenlabrada | 34 | 18 | 16 | 2758 | 2719 | Qualification to playoffs |
| 8 | Girona Gavis | 34 | 18 | 16 | 2696 | 2692 | Qualification to playoffs |
| 9 | Unicaja Málaga | 34 | 18 | 16 | 2577 | 2532 | |
| 10 | Pinturas Bruguer Badalona | 34 | 18 | 16 | 2666 | 2565 | |
| 11 | TDK Manresa | 34 | 16 | 18 | 2532 | 2545 | |
| 12 | Cáceres CB | 34 | 14 | 20 | 2566 | 2613 | |
| 13 | Fórum Valladolid | 34 | 13 | 21 | 2574 | 2625 | |
| 14 | CB Gran Canaria | 34 | 13 | 21 | 2506 | 2585 | |
| 15 | Lobos Caja Cantabria | 34 | 13 | 21 | 2724 | 2891 | |
| 16 | León Caja España | 34 | 13 | 21 | 2478 | 2699 | |
| 17 | Covirán Cervezas Alhambra | 34 | 8 | 26 | 2436 | 2730 | Relegation to LEB |
| 18 | Recreativos Orenes Murcia | 34 | 4 | 30 | 2517 | 2852 | Relegation to LEB |

== Playoffs ==
Quarter Finals
1 | FC Barcelona | 3
8 | Girona Gavis | 0
4 | Tau Cerámica | 1
5 | Adecco Estudiantes | 3
2 | Real Madrid | 3
7 | Baloncesto Fuenlabrada | 0
3 | Caja San Fernando | 3
6 | Pamesa Valencia | 2

SemiFinals
1 | FC Barcelona | 3
5 | Adecco Estudiantes | 0
2 | Real Madrid | 1
3 | Caja San Fernando | 3

Finals
1 | FC Barcelona | 3
3 | Caja San Fernando | 0

1998-99 ACB League
FC Barcelona
11th Title

== See also ==
- Liga ACB
