= 1997–98 ACB season =

Spanish basketball season

1997-98 ACB season
- League: Liga ACB
- Sport: Basketball
- Games: 340
- Teams: 18
- TV partner: Televisión Española

Regular Season
- Season MVP: (Serbia and Montenegro) Dejan Bodiroga (Real Madrid)

Playoffs

ACB Finals
- Champions: TDK Manresa
- Runners-up: Tau Cerámica
- Finals MVP: (Spain) Joan Creus (TDK Manresa)

ACB seasons
- ← 1996–97 1998–99 →

The 1997–98 ACB season was the 16th season of the Liga ACB.

== Regular season ==
Pos	Team	J	G	P	PF	PC	Qualification
1	TAU Cerámica	34	27	7	2906	2627	Championship Playoffs
2	Real Madrid Teka	34	25	9	2782	2507	Championship Playoffs
3	Adecco Estudiantes	34	24	10	2889	2651	Championship Playoffs
4	Festina Joventut	34	24	10	3068	2889	Championship Playoffs
5	FC Barcelona	34	21	13	2894	2760	Championship Playoffs
6	TDK Manresa	34	21	13	2728	2593	Championship Playoffs
7	Pamesa Valencia	34	20	14	2692	2635	Championship Playoffs
8	Unicaja Málaga	34	20	14	2703	2607	Championship Playoffs
9	Fórum Valladolid	34	16	18	2709	2816	
10	CB Gran Canaria	34	15	19	2833	2838	
11	León Caja España	34	14	20	2646	2811	
12	Valvi Girona	34	14	20	2917	2983	
13	Caja San Fernando	34	13	21	2677	2757	
14	Caja Cantabria	34	12	22	2720	2821	
15	Cáceres CB	34	12	22	2605	2799	Relegation playoffs
16	Covirán Sierra Nevada	34	11	23	2715	2823	Relegation playoffs
17	CB Ciudad de Huelva	34	9	25	2603	2921	Relegation playoffs
18	Ourense Xacobeo 99	34	8	26	2578	2827	Relegation playoffs

== Relegation playoffs ==
Finals
15	Cáceres CB	3
18	Ourense Xacobeo 99	1

Finals
16	Covirán SN	3
17	CB Ciudad de Huelva	2

Ourense Xacobeo 99 and CB Ciudad de Huelva, relegated to LEB.

== Championship Playoffs ==
Quarter Finals
1	Tau Cerámica	3
8	Unicaja Málaga	0
4	Festina Joventut	1
5	FC Barcelona	3
2	Real Madrid	3
7	Pamesa Valencia	1
3	Adecco Estudiantes	1
6	TDK Manresa	3

SemiFinals
1	Tau Cerámica	3
5	FC Barcelona	0
2	Real Madrid	1
6	TDK Manresa	3

Finals
1	Tau Cerámica	1
6	TDK Manresa	3

1997-98 ACB League
TDK Manresa
First Title

== See also ==
- Liga ACB
