= 2008–09 ACB season =

2008-09 ACB season
- League: Liga ACB
- Sport: Basketball
- Duration: October 4, 2008 - May 10, 2009
- Games: 256 (regular season); 19 (playoffs)
- Teams: 17
- TV partner: Televisión Española

Regular Season
- Season champions: TAU Cerámica
- Season MVP: (Spain) Felipe Reyes (Real Madrid)
- Top scorer: (Serbia) Igor Rakočević (TAU Cerámica)

Playoffs

ACB Finals
- Champions: FC Barcelona
- Runners-up: TAU Cerámica
- Finals MVP: (Spain) Juan Carlos Navarro

ACB seasons
- ← 2007–08 2009–10 →

The 2008–09 ACB season is the 26th season of the Liga ACB. The 272-game regular season (16 home games for each of the 17 teams) began on Saturday, October 4, 2008, and ended on Sunday, May 10, 2009. The top four teams earned berths in the Euroleague competition for 2009–10, the international basketball competition for European professional teams.

== Team standings ==
Direct access to Euroleague 2009–10
Clinched playoff berth
Eliminated from playoffs contention
Relegated

Team standings after 34 games.

#	Teams	GP	W	L	PF	PA	Diff
1	Tau Cerámica	32	28	4	2865	2464	+401
2	Regal FC Barcelona	32	26	6	2601	2278	+323
3	Unicaja	32	24	8	2668	2325	+343
4	Real Madrid	32	23	9	2690	2528	+162
5	DKV Joventut	32	22	10	2647	2525	+122
6	Kalise Gran Canaria	32	20	12	2566	2487	+79
7	Pamesa Valencia	32	16	16	2452	2416	+36
8	iurbentia Bilbao	32	15	17	2451	2492	-41
9	Alta Gestión Fuenlabrada	32	15	17	2669	2639	+30
10	Ricoh Manresa	32	14	18	2382	2503	-121
11	CB Granada	32	12	20	2369	2516	-147
12	Bruesa GBC	32	11	21	2448	2589	-141
13	MMT Estudiantes	32	11	21	2473	2586	-113
14	Cajasol	32	10	22	2429	2641	-212
15	CB Murcia	32	9	23	2347	2636	-289
16	ViveMenorca	32	8	24	2281	2481	-200
17	CAI Zaragoza	32	8	24	2383	2615	-232

|} |}

== Stats leaders ==
=== Points ===
Rank	Name	Team	PPG
1.	(Serbia) Igor Rakočević	Tau Cerámica	19.4
2.	(United States) Brad Oleson	Alta Gestión Fuenlabrada	18.0
3.	(Argentina) Paolo Quinteros	CAI Zaragoza	17.4
4.	(United States) Taquan Dean	CB Murcia	16.7
5.	(United States) Pooh Jeter	ViveMenorca	16.3

=== Rebounds ===
Rank	Name	Team	RPG
1.	(United States) Curtis Borchardt	CB Granada	9.9
2.	(Spain) Felipe Reyes	Real Madrid	8.9
3.	(United States) Nik Caner-Medley	Cajasol Sevilla	8.0
4.	(United States) Andrew Panko	Bruesa GBC	6.8
5.	(Turkey) Ersan İlyasova	Regal FC Barcelona	6.8

=== Assists ===
Rank	Name	Team	APG
1.	(Spain) Javier Rodríguez	Ricoh Manresa	6.1
2.	(Spain) Ricky Rubio	DKV Joventut	5.8
3.	(United States) Chris Thomas	CB Murcia	5.0
4.	(Latvia) Kristaps Valters	Alta Gestión Fuenlabrada	4.8
5.	(Argentina) Pablo Prigioni	TAU Cerámica	4.7

== Awards ==
=== Regular season MVP ===
- Felipe Reyes - Real Madrid

=== MVP Week by Week ===
Date	Player	Team	Efficiency
1	(Spain) Saúl Blanco	Alta Gestión Fuenlabrada	33
2	(United States) Brad Oleson	Alta Gestión Fuenlabrada (2)	39
3	(Spain) Felipe Reyes	Real Madrid	40
4	(Italy) Andrea Pecile	Cajasol	26
5	(Spain) Felipe Reyes (2)	Real Madrid (2)	34
6	(United States) Tom Wideman	MMT Estudiantes	29
7	(United States) Chris Thomas	CB Murcia	32
8	(United States) Marcus Haislip	Unicaja	31
9	(Serbia) Igor Rakočević	Tau Cerámica	33
10	(Serbia) Igor Rakočević (2)	Tau Cerámica (2)	32
11	(Brazil) Tiago Splitter (Spain) Saúl Blanco (2)	Tau Cerámica (3); Alta Gestión Fuenlabrada (3)	33
12	(United States) Pooh Jeter	ViveMenorca	31
13	(United States) Curtis Borchardt	CB Granada	35
14	(United States) Curtis Borchardt (2)	CB Granada (2)	41
15	(Spain) Felipe Reyes (3) (Spain) Fran Vázquez	Real Madrid (3); Regal FC Barcelona	32
16	(Canada) Carl English	Kalise Gran Canaria	37
17	(Argentina) Paolo Quinteros	CAI Zaragoza	33
18	(United States) Brad Oleson (2) (United States) Curtis Borchardt (3)	Alta Gestión Fuenlabrada (4); CB Granada (3)	32
19	(Brazil) Tiago Splitter (2)	Tau Cerámica (4)	36
20	(Serbia) Igor Rakočević (3)	Tau Cerámica (5)	39
21	(United States) Curtis Borchardt (4)	CB Granada (4)	41
22	(United States) Pete Mickeal	Tau Cerámica (6)	28
23	(United States) Marcus Haislip (2) (United States) Brad Oleson (3)	Unicaja (2); Alta Gestión Fuenlabrada (5)	33
24	(United States) Lamont Barnes	CB Murcia (2)	31
25	(Belgium) Axel Hervelle	Real Madrid (4)	36
26	(Spain) Fran Vázquez (2)	Regal FC Barcelona (2)	36
27	(Spain) Fran Vázquez (3)	Regal FC Barcelona (3)	45
28	(United States) Clay Tucker	Cajasol (2)	39
29	(Spain) Felipe Reyes (4)	Real Madrid (5)	34
30	(Senegal) Boniface N'Dong	Unicaja (3)	31
31	(United States) Jimmie Hunter	CB Granada (5)	34
32	(United States) Jimmie Hunter (2)	CB Granada (6)	41
33	(France) Jérôme Moïso	DKV Joventut	38
34	(Spain) Guillem Rubio	Ricoh Manresa	35

=== MVP Month by Month ===
Month	Player	Team	Efficiency
October	(Spain) Felipe Reyes	Real Madrid	30,8
November	(Serbia) Igor Rakočević	Tau Cerámica	26,2
December	(United States) Curtis Borchardt	CB Granada	34,3
January	(Canada) Carl English	Kalise Gran Canaria	24,3
February	(United States) Brad Oleson	Alta Gestión Fuenlabrada	30,5
March	(Spain) Fran Vázquez	Regal FC Barcelona	28,75
April	(United States) Jimmie Hunter	CB Granada (2)	21,2

=== All-ACB Team ===
Position	Player	Team
PG	(Argentina) Pablo Prigioni	Tau Cerámica
SG	(Serbia) Igor Rakočević	Tau Cerámica
SF	(Spain) Juan Carlos Navarro	Regal FC Barcelona
C	(Spain) Fran Vázquez	Regal FC Barcelona
C	(Spain) Felipe Reyes	Real Madrid
