= 2000–01 ACB season =

- League: Liga ACB
- Sport: Basketball
- Games: 340
- Teams: 18
- TV partner: Canal+

Regular Season
- Season champions: FC Barcelona
- Season MVP: (United States) Lou Roe (Gijón Baloncesto)

Playoffs

ACB Finals
- Champions: FC Barcelona
- Runners-up: Real Madrid
- Finals MVP: (Spain) Pau Gasol (FC Barcelona)

ACB seasons
- ← 1999–2000 2001–02 →

The 2001-02 ACB season was the 19th season of the Liga ACB.

== Regular season ==
Pos	Equipo	J	G	P	PF	PC	Qualification or relegation
1	FC Barcelona	34	29	5	3055	2613	Qualified for playoffs
2	Real Madrid	34	27	7	2788	2519	Qualified for playoffs
3	TAU Cerámica	34	27	7	2888	2452	Qualified for playoffs
4	Unicaja Málaga	34	27	7	2883	2582	Qualified for playoffs
5	Pamesa Valencia	34	22	12	2760	2622	Qualified for playoffs
6	Adecco Estudiantes	34	21	13	2767	2698	Qualified for playoffs
7	Jabones Pardo Fuenlabrada	34	20	14	2752	2669	Qualified for playoffs
8	Fórum Valladolid	34	16	18	2759	2795	Qualified for playoffs
9	Casademont Girona	34	15	19	2733	2797	
10	Cáceres CB	34	14	20	2650	2732	
11	Breogán Universidade	34	13	21	2669	2722	
12	Caja San Fernando	34	13	21	2605	2642	
13	Canarias Telecom	34	12	22	2591	2808	
14	Joventut Badalona	34	11	23	2692	2820	
15	Gijón Baloncesto	34	11	23	2643	2823	
16	Cantabria Lobos	34	10	24	2484	2894	
17	Proaguas Costablanca	34	9	25	2554	2846	Relegated to LEB
18	Club Ourense Baloncesto	34	9	25	2630	2869	Relegated to LEB

== Playoffs ==
Quarter Finals
1	FC Barcelona	3
8	Fórum Valladolid	0
4	Unicaja Málaga	3
5	Pamesa Valencia	1
2	Real Madrid	3
7	JP Fuenlabrada	0
3	Tau Cerámica	3
6	Adecco Estudiantes	1

SemiFinals
1	FC Barcelona	3
4	Unicaja Málaga	0
2	Real Madrid	3
3	Tau Cerámica	2

Finals
1	FC Barcelona	3
2	Real Madrid	0

2000-01 ACB League
FC Barcelona
12th Title

== See also ==
- Liga ACB
