= Tanoka Beard =

American basketball player (born 1971)

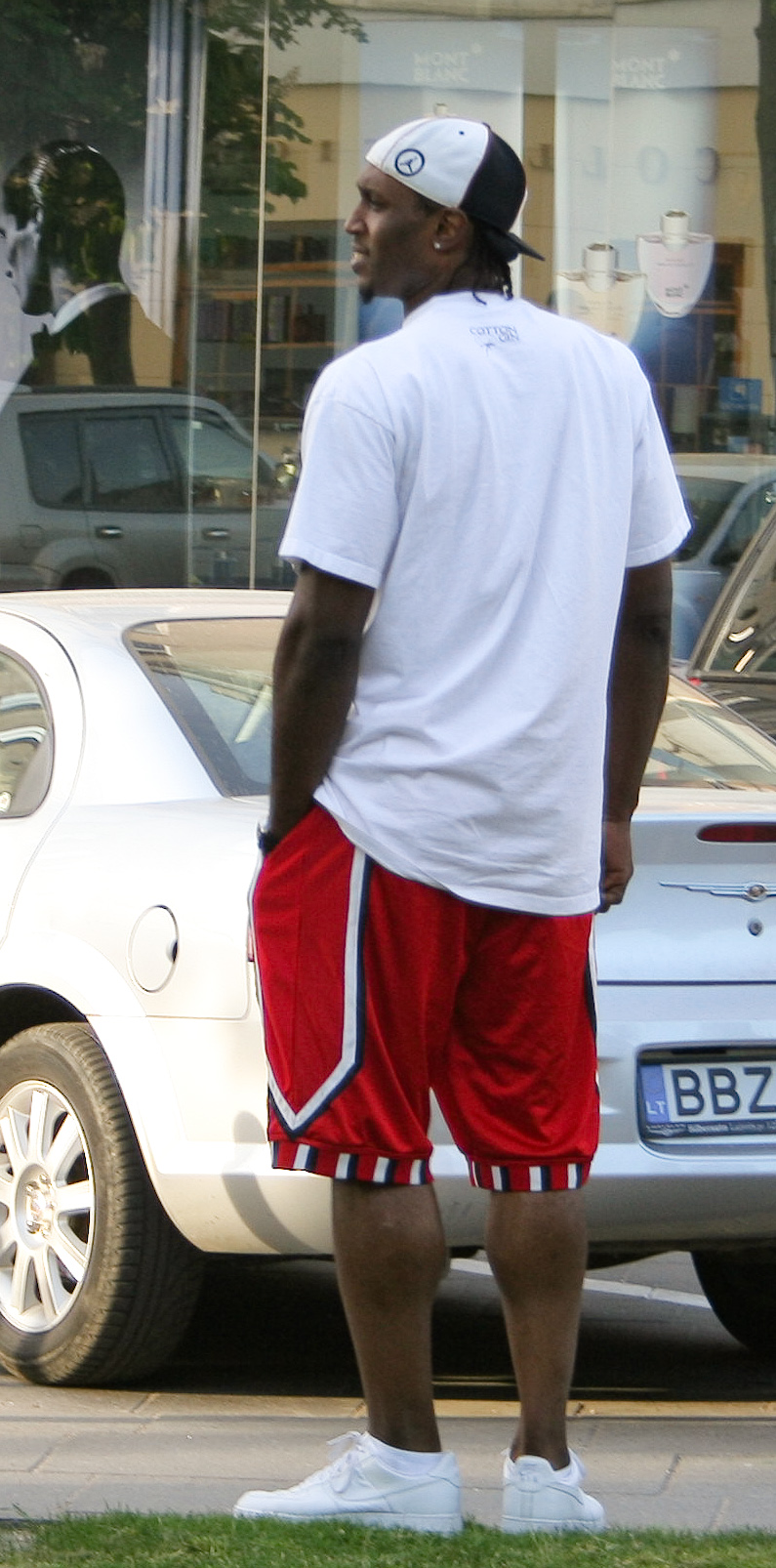
- Beard in Vilnius, Lithuania, in 2007

Personal information
- Born: September 29, 1971 (age 55) Ogden, Utah
- Listed height: 6 ft 9 in (2.06 m)
- Listed weight: 267 lb (121 kg)

Career information
- High school: Bonneville (Washington Terrace, Utah)
- College: Boise State (1989–1993)
- NBA draft: 1993: undrafted
- Playing career: 1993–2009
- Position: Center / power forward
- Number: 6
- Coaching career: 2012–present

Career history

Playing
- 1993–1994: Lottomatica Roma
- 1994: Leche Río Breogán
- 1994–1995: Ülkerspor
- 1995–1996: Besançon BCD
- 1996–1998: Joventut Badalona
- 1998–1999: Real Madrid
- 1999–2000: Pamesa Valencia
- 2000–2001: Fenerbahçe
- 2001–2002: Joventut Badalona
- 2002: Lokomotiv MV
- 2003–2007: Žalgiris Kaunas
- 2007–2008: Hapoel Holon
- 2008: Guayama Wizards
- 2008: Fajardo Cariduros
- 2008–2009: Tartu Ülikool/Rock

Coaching
- 2012–2014: Layton Christian Academy (assistant)
- 2014–2018: American Preparatory Academy (assistant)
- 2018–2019: Layton Christian Academy (assistant)
- 2019–: Ben Lomond High

Career highlights
- As player: All-EuroLeague Second Team (2005); 2× FIBA EuroStar (1998, 1999); Spanish Cup winner (1997); 2× Spanish League MVP (1999, 2002); 5× Spanish League All-Star (1996–1999, 2001); Turkish League champion (1995); 4× Lithuanian League champion (2003–2005, 2007); Lithuanian Federation Cup winner (2007); 4× Lithuanian League MVP (2003–2005, 2007); 2× Lithuanian League Finals MVP (2004, 2007); 2× Lithuanian All-Star Game MVP (2004, 2005); Baltic League champion (2005); Baltic League MVP (2005); Baltic League Final Four MVP (2005); 3× All-BSC First Team (1991–1993)

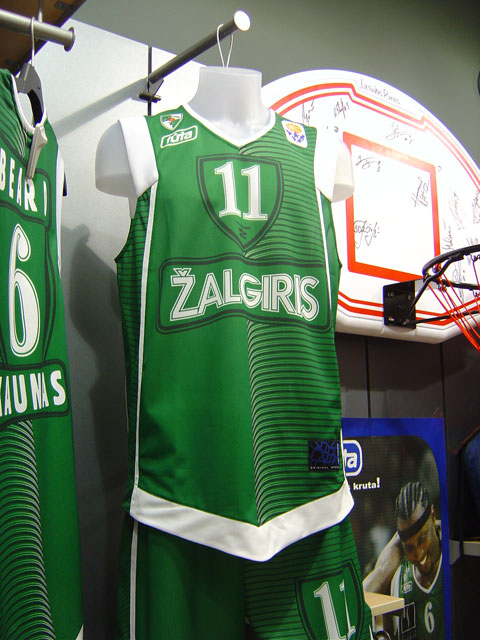
Beard's former Žalgiris #6 jersey (left)

Tanoka Dwight Beard (born September 29, 1971) is an American former professional basketball player and coach. During his career, he was able to play both the power forward and center positions. He earned an All-EuroLeague Second Team selection in 2005, while leading the competition in rebounds, with an average of 10.6 per game. He won various European national domestic league championships and national domestic cup titles, in three different European countries.

== High school ==
Beard attended Bonneville High School, in Washington Terrace, Utah, where he played high school basketball.

== College career ==
After high school, Beard played college basketball at Boise State University, with the Boise State Broncos, from 1989 to 1993. He was named the Big Sky Conference's Freshman of the Year in 1990. He was named to the Big Sky Conference's First Team in 1991, 1992, and 1993. He was also named the MVP of the Big Sky Conference Tournament in 1993.

Over his four year college career, Beard averaged 17.7 points, 6.1 rebounds, and 1.5 blocks per game. In his senior season, he averaged 21.0 points, 7.7 rebounds and 1.4 blocks per game. Beard was named to the school's all-time basketball team in 2007.

== Professional career ==
Beard was twice named the Liga ACB's (Spain's top-tier level league) Most Valuable Player, in 1999 and 2002. He also holds the EuroLeague record, for the highest Performance Index Rating (PIR), in a single game, with 63. He achieved the record while he was a member of Žalgiris Kaunas, in a EuroLeague 2003–04 season game against Fortitudo Bologna, on 22 January 2004. In that game, Beard recorded 35 points, 19 rebounds, 2 steals, and 2 blocks, in 38 minutes of playing time.

== Coaching career ==
After he retired from playing pro club basketball, Beard began working as a basketball coach in 2012. In 2013, he opened up a basketball academy youth club called Ogden Pride Youth Basketball Club, in Ogden, Utah.

== Awards and achievements ==
=== Ülkerspor ===
- Turkish Super League Champion: (1994–95)

=== Joventut Badalona ===
- Spanish King's Cup Winner: (1996–97)

=== Žalgiris Kaunas ===
- 4× Lithuanian League Champion: (2002–03, 2003–04, 2004–05, 2006–07)
- Baltic League Champion: (2004–05)
- Lithuanian Federation Cup Winner: (2006–07)

=== Personal ===
- 5× Spanish League All-Star: (1996, 1997, 1998, 1999, 2001)
- 13× Spanish League Player of the Week: (1996–02)
- 10× Spanish League Player of the Month: (1997–02)
- 2× FIBA EuroStar: (1998–99, 1999–00)
- Led the Spanish League in rebounding: (1998–99, 1999–00, 2001–02)
- 2× Spanish League MVP: (1998–99, 2001–02)
- Led the Turkish Super League in rebounding: (2000–01)
- 5× EuroLeague MVP of the Round: (2003–07)
- 5× Lithuanian League All-Star: (2003, 2004, 2005, 2006, 2007)
- PIR record in a single EuroLeague game: (2004)
- 2× Lithuanian All-Star Game MVP: (2003–04, 2004–05)
- 4× Lithuanian League MVP: (2002–03, 2003–04, 2004–05, 2006–07)
- Lithuanian League Finals MVP: (2003–04, 2006–07)
- Baltic League MVP: (2004–05)
- Baltic League Final Four MVP: (2004–05)
- All-EuroLeague Second Team: (2004–05)
- 2× Led the EuroLeague in rebounding: (2004–05, 2006–07)
- Led the Lithuanian League in rebounding: (2004–05)
- 2× Baltic League All-Star: (2006, 2007)
- Baltic League All Star Game MVP: (2007)

== Musical career ==
During 2005–06 season with Žalgiris, Beard recorded a track and a music video, with duo Linas and Simona, named "I Love U". This song was released on the album with the same name, on 22 July 2005, and in two weeks, it reached number 1 on the Lithuanian M-1 radio station. The lead singer of the duo, Linas Adomaitis, produced Beard's album, which has never been released.

== EuroLeague career statistics ==
Legend
GP	Games played	GS	Games started	MPG	Minutes per game
FG%	Field-goal percentage	3P%	3-point field-goal percentage	FT%	Free-throw percentage
RPG	Rebounds per game	APG	Assists per game	SPG	Steals per game
BPG	Blocks per game	PPG	Points per game	PIR	Performance index rating
**Bold**	Career high

Led the league

Year	Team	GP	GS	MPG	FG%	3P%	FT%	RPG	APG	SPG	BPG	PPG	PIR
2002–03	Žalgiris Kaunas	3	2	30.0	**.629**	.000	**.875**	**13.3**	1.7	**1.7**	.3	17.0	**27.3**
2003–04	Žalgiris Kaunas	**20**	10	26.0	.561	.000	.696	7.6	.7	1.1	**.8**	14.6	17.4
2004–05	Žalgiris Kaunas	**20**	**20**	**32.5**	.578	**.333**	.771	10.6	1.3	1.5	.4	**18.0**	21.9
2005–06	Žalgiris Kaunas	14	13	27.8	.429	.130	.781	8.1	**2.1**	.9	.3	13.6	15.4
2006–07	Žalgiris Kaunas	14	14	31.0	.547	.214	.667	9.9	1.6	.9	.6	14.5	18.3
2007–08	Žalgiris Kaunas	2	0	19.7	.308	.000	.500	4.0	.5	1.5	.5	5.5	4.0
Career		73	59	29.1	.536	.188	.730	9.1	1.3	1.1	.5	15.2	18.5
