= 2003–04 ACB season =

2003-04 ACB season
- League: Liga ACB
- Sport: Basketball
- Games: 340
- Teams: 18
- TV partner: Televisión Española

Regular Season
- Season champions: TAU Cerámica
- Season MVP: (Argentina) Andrés Nocioni (TAU Cerámica)

Playoffs

ACB Finals
- Champions: FC Barcelona
- Runners-up: Adecco Estudiantes
- Finals MVP: (Serbia and Montenegro) Dejan Bodiroga (FC Barcelona)

ACB seasons
- ← 2002–03 2004–05 →

The 2003–04 ACB season was the 21st season of the Liga ACB.

== Regular season ==
Pos	Team	GP	GW	GL	PF	PC	Qualification or relegation
1	TAU Cerámica	34	28	6	2964	2668	Qualified for Playoffs
2	FC Barcelona	34	23	11	2606	2462	Qualified for Playoffs
3	Pamesa Valencia	34	23	11	2841	2659	Qualified for Playoffs
4	Adecco Estudiantes	34	20	14	2750	2642	Qualified for Playoffs
5	Real Madrid	34	20	14	2846	2727	Qualified for Playoffs
6	Unicaja Málaga	34	20	14	2621	2623	Qualified for Playoffs
7	Auna Gran Canaria	34	17	17	2551	2529	Qualified for Playoffs
8	DKV Joventut	34	16	18	2829	2759	Qualified for Playoffs
9	Ricoh Manresa	34	16	18	2707	2697	
10	Unelco Tenerife	34	16	18	2651	2715	
11	Fórum Valladolid	34	16	18	2798	2844	
12	Caja San Fernando	34	15	19	2708	2684	
13	Casademont Girona	34	15	19	2735	2785	
14	Etosa Alicante	34	14	20	2558	2633	
15	Leche Río Breogán	34	14	20	2714	2818	
16	Caprabo Lleida	34	13	21	2673	2790	
17	Jabones Pardo Fuenlabrada	34	13	21	2704	2932	Relegated to LEB
18	Polaris World Murcia	34	7	27	2565	2854	Relegated to LEB

Play-Offs	Direct relegation

== Playoffs ==
Quarter Finals
1	TAU Cerámica	3
8	DKV Joventut	0
4	Adecco Estudiantes	3
5	Real Madrid	1
2	FC Barcelona	3
7	Auna Gran Canara	1
3	Pamesa Valencia	2
6	Unicaja Málaga	3

SemiFinals
1	TAU Cerámica	2
4	Adecco Estudiantes	3
2	FC Barcelona	3
6	Unicaja Málaga	0

Finals
2	FC Barcelona	3
4	Adecco Estudiantes	2

2003-04 ACB League
FC Barcelona
14th Title

== See also ==
- Liga ACB
