= Darryl Middleton =

American basketball player and coach (born 1966)

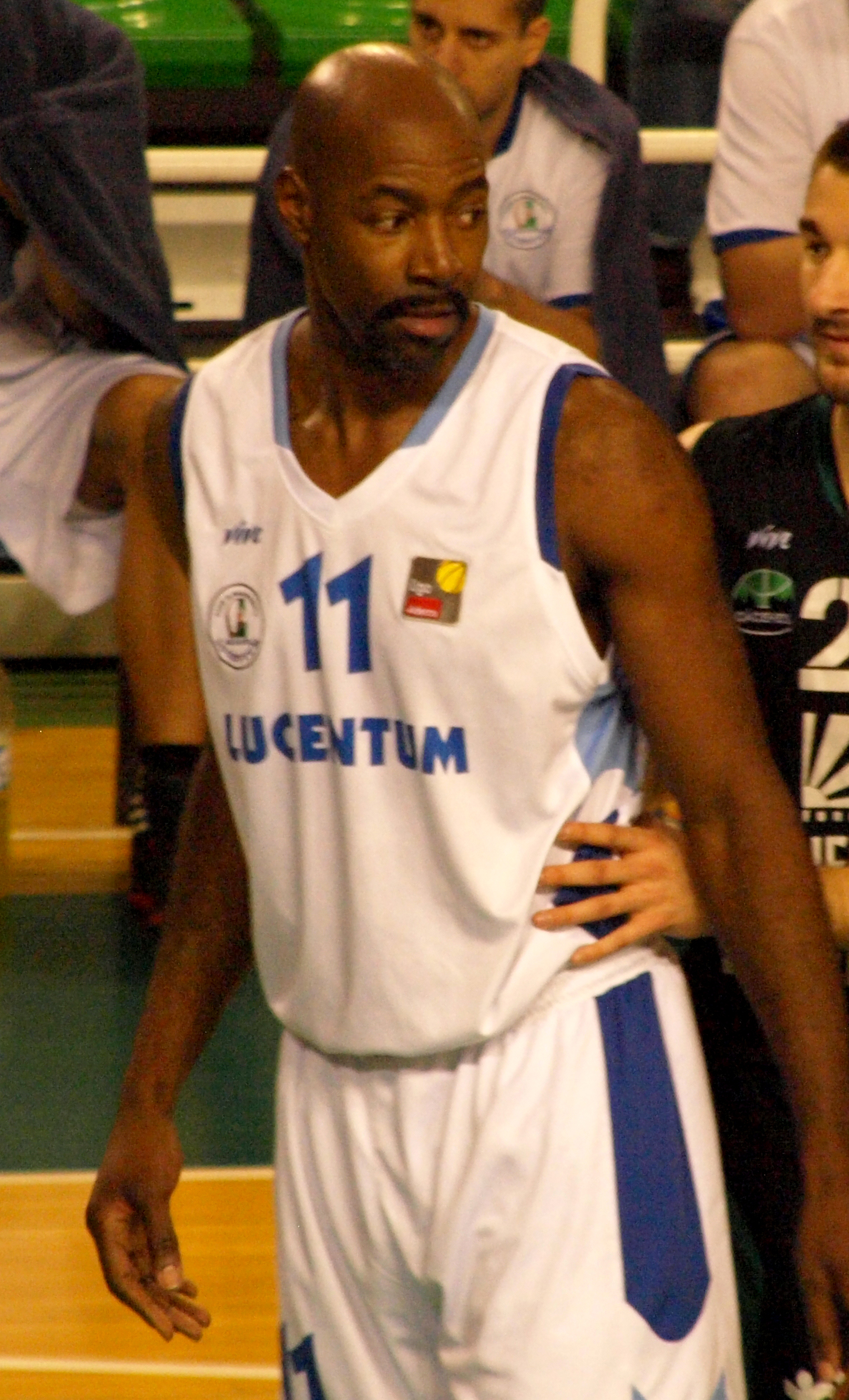
- Middleton with CB Lucentum Alicante in 2013

Bàsquet Girona
- Title: Assistant coach
- League: Liga ACB

Personal information
- Born: July 21, 1966 (age 60) New York City, New York, U.S.
- Listed height: 6 ft 8 in (2.03 m)
- Listed weight: 240 lb (109 kg)

Career information
- High school: William Cullen Bryant (Queens, New York)
- College: Baylor (1984–1988)
- NBA draft: 1988: 3rd round, 68th overall pick
- Drafted by: Atlanta Hawks
- Playing career: 1988–2014
- Position: Power forward
- Number: 7, 11, 44
- Coaching career: 2014–present

Career history

Playing
- 1988–1989: Çukurova Sanayi
- 1989–1991: Aresium Milan
- 1991–1992: Girona
- 1992–1994: Caja San Fernando
- 1994–1996: FC Barcelona
- 1996–1998: Girona
- 1998–1999: Joventut Badalona
- 1999–2000: Girona
- 2000–2005: Panathinaikos
- 2005–2006: Dynamo Saint Petersburg
- 2006–2011: Girona
- 2011: Valencia Basket
- 2011–2012: Girona
- 2012–2013: CB Lucentum Alicante
- 2013–2014: CB Benidorm

Coaching
- 2014–2024: CSKA Moscow (assistant)
- 2024–present: Girona (assistant)

Career highlights
- As a player: EuroLeague champion (2002); 3× Spanish League MVP (1992, 1993, 2000); 3× Spanish All-Star (1992–1994); 2× Spanish League champion (1995, 1996); 4× Greek League champion (2001, 2003–2005); 2× Greek Cup winner (2003, 2005); 2x Italian All-Star Game (1990, 1998); FIBA EuroCup champion (2007); SWC Player of the Year (1988); 2× First-team All-SWC (1987, 1988); As an assistant coach: 2× EuroLeague champion (2016, 2019); 3× VTB United League champion (2015–2017); 5× Gomelsky Cup champion (2015, 2016, 2018–2020)
- Stats at Basketball Reference

Darryl Bryan Middleton (born July 21, 1966) is an American former professional basketball player and current assistant coach for Girona of the Liga ACB. Standing at 6 ft 8 in (2.03 m), he played at the power forward position. He holds the record for being the oldest player to ever play a game in the history of the Spanish ACB League. He also holds a Spanish passport.

== College career ==
Middleton played college basketball with the Baylor Bears.

== Professional career ==
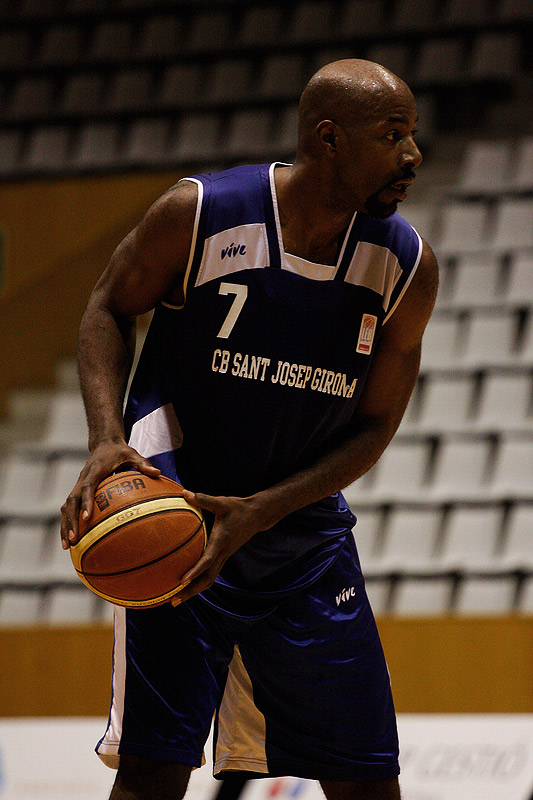
Middleton, at Girona.

After college, Middleton was selected by the Atlanta Hawks in the 3rd round (68th overall) of the 1988 NBA draft. However, he never played in the NBA. He did however, have a prosperous basketball career in Europe, with teams such as: Çukurova Sanayi, Aresium Milan, Girona, FC Barcelona, Joventut Badalona, Caja San Fernando, Panathinaikos, and Dynamo Saint Petersburg.

He won three Spanish League Most Valuable Player awards (1992, 1993, 2000). He also won two Spanish League championships (1995, 1996), while playing with FC Barcelona. From 2000 to 2005, Middleton played with Panathinaikos, and with them he won four Greek League championships (2001, 2003, 2004, 2005), two Greek Cups (2003, 2005), and the 2001–02 Euroleague championship. In 2007, Middleton won the FIBA EuroCup, while playing with Girona.

He then continued to play with Girona, as part of the re-founded Sant Josep. In March 2011, he signed a contract with Valencia Basket.

After Girona, he signed with CB Lucentum Alicante. Lucentum Alicante, despite having finished in 6th place in the Liga ACB, and having earned the right to play in European-wide league, sold their place in the top Spanish League, and played instead in the Spanish 2nd Division LEB Oro, during the 2012–13 season. This was due to financial issues. Middleton was a part of the team during that season, and he helped them to finish in 3rd place in the Spanish 2nd Division, and after winning in the league's playoffs, they earned a return to the top-tier level Liga ACB.

In October 2013, at the age of 47, Middleton signed with Servigroup Benidorm of the Liga EBA, the Spanish fourth division league.

== Coaching career ==
In June 2014, Middleton was appointed as an assistant coach for Dimitrios Itoudis in the Russian team CSKA Moscow.
