= 2004–05 ACB season =

2004-05 ACB season
- League: Liga ACB
- Sport: Basketball
- Games: 340
- Teams: 18
- TV partner: Televisión Española

Regular season
- Season champions: TAU Cerámica
- Season MVP: (Argentina) Luis Scola (TAU Cerámica)

Playoffs

ACB Finals
- Champions: Real Madrid
- Runners-up: Real Madrid
- Finals MVP: (United States) Louis Bullock (Real Madrid)

ACB seasons
- ← 2003–04 2005–06 →

The 2004–05 ACB season was the 22nd season of the Liga ACB.

#	Teams	GP	W	L	PF	PA
1P	TAU Ceramica	34	28	6	3.106	2.692
2P	Real Madrid	34	26	8	2.720	2.457
3P	Winterthur FC Barcelona	34	24	10	2.723	2.579
4P	Unicaja Málaga	34	23	11	2.775	2.531
5P	Etosa Alicante	34	23	11	2.813	2.629
6P	Adecco Estudiantes	34	21	13	2.915	2.773
7P	DKV Joventut	34	20	14	2.840	2.719
8P	Gran Canaria	34	19	15	2.539	2.446
9	Pamesa Valencia	34	18	16	2.950	2.893
10	Caja San Fernando	34	14	20	2.786	2.841
11	Leche Rio Breogan	34	13	21	2.814	2.889
12	Forum Valladolid	34	13	21	2.677	2.868
13	Ricoh Manresa	34	12	22	2.649	2.783
14	Lagun Aro Bilbao	34	12	22	2.634	2.801
15	CB Granada	34	12	22	2.632	2.881
16	Casademont Girona	34	11	23	2.786	2.996
17R	Plus Pujol Lleida	34	9	25	2.447	2.763
18R	Unelco Tenerife	34	8	26	2.667	2.932

Playoffs	Direct relegation

== Playoffs ==
Quarterfinals
1	TAU Cerámica	3
8	Gran Canaria	1
4	Unicaja Málaga	3
5	Etosa Alicante	2
2	Real Madrid	3
7	Joventut Badalona	1
3	Winterthur FC Barcelona	1
6	Adecco Estudiantes	3

Semifinals
1	TAU Cerámica	3
4	Unicaja Málaga	1
2	Real Madrid	3
6	Adecco Estudiantes	1

Finals
1	TAU Cerámica	2
2	Real Madrid	3

2004-05 ACB League
Real Madrid
29th title
7th since ACB

== See also ==
- Liga ACB
