= 2006–07 ACB season =

2006-07 ACB season
- League: ACB
- Sport: Basketball
- Duration: September 30, 2006 - June 24, 2007
- Games: 340 (regular season); 30 (playoff)
- Teams: 18
- TV partner: Televisión Española

Regular Season
- Season champions: TAU Cerámica
- Season MVP: (Argentina) Luis Scola
- Top scorer: (Spain) Juan Carlos Navarro

Playoffs

ACB Finals
- Champions: Real Madrid
- Runners-up: Winterthur FC Barcelona
- Finals MVP: (Spain) Felipe Reyes

ACB seasons
- ← 2005–06 2007–08 →

The 2006–07 ACB season was the 24th season of the Liga ACB. The regular season began on Saturday, September 30, 2006, and ended on Sunday, May 13, 2007. The regular season ended with TAU Cerámica in first place, but Real Madrid won the ACB finals against Wintethur FC Barcelona.

Clinched playoff berth
Eliminated from playoffs contention
Relegated

Team standings after 34 games.

#	Teams	GP	W	L	PF	PA	Diff
1	TAU Cerámica	34	26	8	2858	2547	+311
2	Real Madrid	34	25	9	2836	2532	+304
3	DKV Joventut	34	23	11	2736	2575	+161
4	Winterthur FC Barcelona	34	23	11	2656	2434	+222
5	Akasvayu Girona	34	21	13	2739	2638	+101
6	Gran Canaria Grupo Dunas	34	21	13	2648	2591	+57
7	Pamesa Valencia	34	19	15	2573	2553	+20
8	Unicaja	34	17	17	2578	2438	+140
9	MMT Estudiantes	34	16	18	2635	2744	-109
10	Lagun Aro Bilbao	34	15	19	2516	2610	-94
11	CB Granada	34	15	19	2648	2726	-91
12	Alta Gestión Fuenlabrada	34	14	20	2508	2583	-75
13	Caja San Fernando	34	14	20	2629	2804	-162
14	Polaris World Murcia	34	13	21	2506	2620	-114
15	ViveMenorca	34	12	22	2542	2705	-163
16	Grupo Capitol Valladolid	34	12	22	2555	2678	-123
17	Etosa Alicante	34	12	22	2469	2678	-209
18	Bruesa GBC	34	8	26	2477	2653	-176

== Playoffs ==
Quarter Finals
1	TAU Cerámica	3
8	Unicaja Málaga	0
4	Winterthur FCB	3
5	Akasvayu Girona	1
2	Real Madrid	3
7	Pamesa Valencia	1
3	DKV Joventut	3
6	Gran Canaria Grupo Dunas	2

SemiFinals
1	TAU Cerámica	2
4	Winterthur FCB	3
2	Real Madrid	3
3	DKV Joventut	2

Finals
4	Winterthur FCB	1
2	Real Madrid	3

2006-07 ACB League
Real Madrid
30th Title
8th since ACB

== Stats Leaders ==
=== Points ===
Rank	Name	Team	Games	Points	PPG
1.	(Spain) Juan Carlos Navarro	Winterthur FC Barcelona	33	572	17.3
2.	(Argentina) Luis Scola	TAU Cerámica	29	492	17.0
3.	(Spain) Rudy Fernández	DKV Joventut	32	520	16.3
4.	(United States) Louis Bullock	Real Madrid	34	525	15.4
5.	(Serbia) Igor Rakočević	TAU Cerámica	32	492	15.4

=== Rebounds ===
Rank	Name	Team	Games	Rebounds	RPG
1.	(United States) Curtis Borchardt	CB Granada	26	274	10.54
2.	(United States) Michael Bradley	Bruesa GBC	32	270	8.44
3.	(United States) Bud Eley	Grupo Capitol Valladolid	34	275	8.09
4.	(France) Frédéric Weis	Lagun Aro Bilbao	34	266	7.82
5.	(United States) Charles Gaines	DKV Joventut	34	264	7.76

=== Assists ===
Rank	Name	Team	Games	Assists	APG
1.	(Argentina) Pepe Sánchez	Unicaja Málaga	31	141	4.55
2.	(Spain) Raül López	Real Madrid	30	130	4.33
3.	(Argentina) Pablo Prigioni	TAU Cerámica	34	147	4.32
4.	(Argentina) Nicolás Gianella	CB Granada	29	108	3.72
5.	(Spain) Javier Salgado	Lagun Aro Bilbao	32	118	3.69

== See also ==
- Liga ACB
