= 1995–96 ACB season =

Spanish professional basketball season

Liga ACB
- Season: 1995–96
- Matches played: 411
- Teams: 20

Regular season
- Top seed: FC Barcelona Banca Catalana
- Season MVP: (United States) Michael Anderson
- Relegated: Festina Andorra; Gijón Baloncesto

Finals
- Champions: FC Barcelona Banca Catalana; 6th ACB title 9th Spanish title
- Runners-up: Caja San Fernando
- Semi-finalists: Estudiantes Argentaria; TDK Manresa
- Finals MVP: (Spain) Xavi Fernández

The 1995–96 ACB season was the 13th season of the top Spanish professional basketball league, since its establishment in 1983. It started on 8 September 1995 with the first round of the regular season and ended on 2 June 1996 with the finals.

FC Barcelona Banca Catalana won their sixth ACB title and their ninth Spanish title after sweeping Caja San Fernando at the finals.

== Teams ==
=== Promotion and relegation (pre-season) ===
A total of 20 teams contested the league, including 18 sides from the 1994–95 season and two promoted from the 1994–95 Liga EBA.

▲ Promoted from 1994–95 Liga EBA	▼ Relegated to 1995–96 Liga EBA
Gran Canaria; Gijón Baloncesto	Pamesa Valencia; Breogán

=== Venues and locations ===
Location of teams in 1995–96 ACB
Location of teams from the Canary Islands in 1995–96 ACB

Team	Home city	Arena
Amway Zaragoza	Zaragoza	Pabellón Príncipe Felipe
Baloncesto León	León	Palacio de los Deportes
Baloncesto Salamanca	Salamanca	Würzburg
Cáceres CB	Cáceres	Universitario V Centenario
Caja San Fernando	Seville	San Pablo
CB Murcia	Murcia	Palacio de Deportes
Estudiantes Argentaria	Madrid	Palacio de Deportes
FC Barcelona Banca Catalana	Barcelona	Palau Blaugrana
Festina Andorra	Andorra la Vella	Poliesportiu d'Andorra
Fórum Valladolid	Valladolid	Polideportivo Pisuerga
Gijón Baloncesto	Gijón	Palacio de Deportes
Gran Canaria	Las Palmas	Centro Insular de Deportes
Grupo AGB Huesca	Huesca	Municipal
Joventut	Badalona	Palau Municipal d'Esports
Real Madrid	Madrid	Palacio de Deportes
Taugrés	Vitoria-Gasteiz	Pabellón Araba
TDK Manresa	Manresa	Nou Congost
Unicaja	Málaga	Ciudad Jardín
Valvi Girona	Girona	Fontajau
Xacobeo 99 Ourense	Ourense	Pazo Paco Paz

== Regular season ==
=== League table ===
Pos	Team	Pld	W	L	PF	PA	PD	Qualification
1	FC Barcelona Banca Catalana	38	30	8	3399	3077	+322	Qualification to championship playoffs
2	Real Madrid	38	28	10	3243	2950	+293	Qualification to championship playoffs
3	Unicaja	38	26	12	3173	2975	+198	Qualification to championship playoffs
4	Estudiantes Argentaria	38	25	13	3250	3050	+200	Qualification to championship playoffs
5	Amway Zaragoza	38	25	13	3346	3231	+115	Qualification to championship playoffs
6	TDK Manresa	38	24	14	3094	2953	+141	Qualification to championship playoffs
7	Caja San Fernando	38	23	15	3242	3106	+136	Qualification to championship playoffs
8	Taugrés	38	21	17	3287	3181	+106	Qualification to championship playoffs
9	Baloncesto Salamanca	38	19	19	3032	3078	−46	
10	Cáceres CB	38	19	19	3281	3213	+68	
11	Valvi Girona	38	19	19	3147	3089	+58	
12	Baloncesto León	38	18	20	3009	3041	−32	
13	Joventut	38	17	21	3076	3151	−75	
14	Gran Canaria	38	16	22	3180	3278	−98	
15	CB Murcia	38	15	23	2963	3102	−139	
16	Fórum Valladolid	38	15	23	3036	3160	−124	
17	Xacobeo 99 Ourense	38	13	25	3044	3301	−257	Qualification to relegation playoffs
18	Festina Andorra	38	10	28	3016	3278	−262	Qualification to relegation playoffs
19	Grupo AGB Huesca	38	9	29	3176	3436	−260	Qualification to relegation playoffs
20	Gijón Baloncesto	38	8	30	2893	3237	−344	Qualification to relegation playoffs

Source: ACB

== Playoffs ==
=== Championship playoffs ===
Quarterfinals
1	FC Barcelona	90	98	83	2
8	Taugrés	94	92	57	1
4	Estudiantes A.	85	79	2
5	Amway Zaragoza	67	70	0
3	Unicaja	90	100	82	1
6	TDK Manresa	69	106	98	2
2	Real Madrid	75	86	0
7	C. San Fernando	83	90	2

Semifinals
1	FC Barcelona	93	87	86	64	84	3
4	Estudiantes A.	76	65	103	82	68	2
6	TDK Manresa	102	82	69	92	73	2
7	C. San Fernando	70	94	79	87	86	3

Finals
1	FC Barcelona	78	101	93	3
7	C. San Fernando	68	95	89	0

Source: ACB

=== Relegation playoffs ===
Team 1	Series	Team 2	1st leg	2nd leg	3rd leg	4th leg	5th leg
Xacobeo 99 Ourense	3–1	Gijón Baloncesto	74–80	77–73	80–77	78–75	—
Festina Andorra	1–3	Grupo AGB Huesca	81–76	70–73	75–88	68–75	—

Source: ACB

== Final standings ==
Pos	Team	Pld	W	L	Qualification or relegation
1	FC Barcelona Banca Catalana (C)	49	38	11	Qualification to EuroLeague
2	Caja San Fernando	48	28	20	Qualification to EuroLeague
3	Estudiantes Argentaria	45	29	16	Qualification to EuroLeague
4	TDK Manresa (Note: TDK Manresa qualified to EuroCup by winning the Copa del Rey.) (X)	46	28	18	Qualification to EuroCup
5	Real Madrid	40	28	12	Qualification to EuroCup
6	Unicaja	41	27	14	Qualification to Korać Cup
7	Amway Zaragoza	40	25	15	
8	Taugrés	41	22	19	Qualification to Korać Cup
9	Baloncesto Salamanca	38	19	19	
10	Cáceres CB	38	19	19	Qualification to Korać Cup
11	Valvi Girona	38	19	19	
12	Baloncesto León	38	18	20	
13	Joventut	38	17	21	
14	Gran Canaria	38	16	22	
15	CB Murcia	38	15	23	
16	Fórum Valladolid	38	15	23	
17	Xacobeo 99 Ourense	42	16	26	
18	Grupo AGB Huesca	42	12	30	
19	Festina Andorra (R)	42	11	31	Relegation to LEB
20	Gijón Baloncesto (R)	42	9	33	Relegation to LEB

Source: ACB
(C) Champions; (R) Relegated; (X) Cup winners
