= 2005–06 ACB season =

- League: Asociación de Clubs de Baloncesto
- Sport: Basketball
- TV partner: Televisión Española
- Season champions: Unicaja

Playoffs

ACB seasons
- ← 2004–05 2006–07 →

The 2005–06 ACB season was the 23rd season of the Liga ACB.

== Promotion and relegation ==
Teams promoted from LEB

Teams relegated to LEB Oro

== Team information ==
=== Stadia and locations ===
Location of teams in ACB League

Team	Home city	Stadium	Capacity
Estudiantes	Madrid	Palacio Vistalegre	15,000
Manresa	Manresa		
Fuenlabrada	Fuenlabrada	Fernando Martín	5,000
Bilbao	Bilbao		
Valladolid	Valladolid	Polideportivo Pisuerga	6,300
Baskonia	Vitoria-Gasteiz	Fernando Buesa Arena	9,900
Caja San Fernando	Sevilla		
Joventut	Badalona	Palau Municipal d'Esports	12,500
Gran Canaria	Las Palmas de Gran Canaria	Centro Insular de Deportes	5,000
Menorca Bàsquet	Mahón	Pabellón Menorca	5,115
Real Madrid	Madrid	Palacio Vistalegre	15,000
Valencia	Valencia	Fuente San Luis	9,000
FC Barcelona	Barcelona	Palau Blaugrana	8,250
Unicaja	Málaga	Martín Carpena Arena	10,500
Girona	Girona		
Granada	Granada		
Breogán	Lugo		
Alicante	Alicante		

== Team standings ==
	Team	Played	W	L	Points for	Points against
1P	Unicaja	34	26	8	2,753	2,512
2P	TAU Cerámica	34	25	9	2,855	2,607
3P	Winterthur FC Barcelona	34	24	10	2,747	2,551
4P	DKV Joventut	34	23	11	2,834	2,645
5P	Gran Canaria	34	20	14	2,568	2,493
6P	Real Madrid Baloncesto	34	19	15	2,640	2,485
7P	Akasvayu Girona	34	18	16	2,739	2,701
8P	Adecco Estudiantes	34	17	17	2,770	2,832
9	Pamesa Valencia	34	16	18	2,638	2,693
10	Alta Gestión Fuenlabrada	34	15	19	2,621	2,706
11	Caja San Fernando	34	14	20	2,662	2,764
12	Etosa Alicante	34	14	20	2,574	2,639
13	CB Granada	34	14	20	2,620	2,755
14	Forum Valladolid	34	13	21	2,706	2,767
15	Lagun Aro Bilbao	34	13	21	2,534	2,672
16	Llanera Menorca	34	12	22	2,600	2,772
17R	Ricoh Manresa	34	12	22	2,599	2,722
18R	Leche Rio Breogan	34	11	23	2,580	2,724

Play-offs	Direct relegation
