= 1994–95 ACB season =

Spanish professional basketball season

Liga ACB
- Season: 1994–95
- Matches played: 412
- Teams: 20

Regular season
- Top seed: FC Barcelona Banca Catalana
- Season MVP: (Lithuania) Arvydas Sabonis
- Relegated: Pamesa Valencia; Breogán

Finals
- Champions: FC Barcelona Banca Catalana; 5th ACB title 8th Spanish title
- Runners-up: Unicaja
- Semi-finalists: Real Madrid; TDK Manresa
- Finals MVP: (United States) Michael Ansley

The 1994–95 ACB season was the 12th season of the top Spanish professional basketball league, since its establishment in 1983. It started on 8 September 1994 with the first round of the regular season and ended on 21 May 1995 with the finals.

FC Barcelona Banca Catalana won their fifth ACB title, and their eighth Spanish title by defeating Unicaja at the fifth leg of the finals in one of the most epic moments in the history of the league. At the fourth leg of the finals, which was very even, with two points of advantage for FC Barcelona and possession for Unicaja, Michael Ansley shot a three-pointer with seven seconds left that could have given to Unicaja its first league title, but missed the three-pointer and sent the series to the fifth leg. At the fifth leg of the finals, FC Barcelona finally won the championship in a fixture that Juan Antonio San Epifanio retired from the basketball as a player.

== Format changes ==
From this season, the league adopted for the regular season a round-robin tournament, in which every team played all others in the league once at home and once away, and reduced to eight the teams competing in the championship playoffs removing the round of 16.

== Teams ==
=== Promotion and relegation (pre-season) ===
A total of 20 teams contested the league, including 19 sides from the 1993–94 season and one promoted from the 1993–94 Primera División.

▲ Promoted from 1993–94 Primera División	▼ Relegated to 1994–95 Liga EBA
~~Cajabilbao~~ (Note: It resigned to promote due to not having enough support to play in the league.); Baloncesto Salamanca	~~Fórum Valladolid~~ (Note: Achieved a vacant berth in the league.); ~~Somontano Huesca~~ (Note: Achieved a vacant berth after OAR Ferrol resigned to its place in the league.)

=== Venues and locations ===
Location of teams in 1994–95 ACB

Team	Home city	Arena
7Up Joventut	Badalona	Palau Municipal d'Esports
Amway Zaragoza	Zaragoza	Pabellón Príncipe Felipe
Baloncesto León	León	Palacio de los Deportes
Baloncesto Murcia	Murcia	Palacio de Deportes
Baloncesto Salamanca	Salamanca	Würzburg
Breogán	Lugo	Pazo dos Deportes
Cáceres CB	Cáceres	Universitario V Centenario
Caja San Fernando	Seville	San Pablo
Coren Orense	Ourense	Pazo Paco Paz
Estudiantes Caja Postal	Madrid	Palacio de Deportes
FC Barcelona Banca Catalana	Barcelona	Palau Blaugrana
Festina Andorra	Andorra la Vella	Poliesportiu d'Andorra
Fórum Valladolid	Valladolid	Polideportivo Pisuerga
Pamesa Valencia	Valencia	Fuente de San Luis
Real Madrid	Madrid	Palacio de Deportes
Somontano Huesca	Huesca	Municipal
Taugrés	Vitoria-Gasteiz	Pabellón Araba
TDK Manresa	Manresa	Nou Congost
Unicaja	Málaga	Ciudad Jardín
Valvi Girona	Girona	Fontajau

== Regular season ==
=== League table ===
Pos	Team	Pld	W	L	PF	PA	PD	Qualification
1	FC Barcelona Banca Catalana	38	30	8	3219	2937	+282	Qualification to championship playoffs
2	Unicaja	38	25	13	3166	3031	+135	Qualification to championship playoffs
3	Taugrés	38	23	15	3291	3170	+121	Qualification to championship playoffs
4	Real Madrid	38	23	15	3090	2875	+215	Qualification to championship playoffs
5	Amway Zaragoza	38	23	15	3381	3311	+70	Qualification to championship playoffs
6	TDK Manresa	38	21	17	2943	2875	+68	Qualification to championship playoffs
7	Estudiantes Caja Postal	38	20	18	3201	3129	+72	Qualification to championship playoffs
8	Festina Andorra	38	20	18	3035	3048	−13	Qualification to championship playoffs
9	Baloncesto León	38	19	19	2942	2894	+48	
10	Caja San Fernando	38	19	19	3040	3033	+7	
11	Fórum Valladolid	38	19	19	3162	3182	−20	
12	Baloncesto Murcia	38	18	20	3239	3271	−32	
13	Cáceres CB	38	17	21	2970	3043	−73	
14	7Up Joventut	38	17	21	2938	3014	−76	
15	Coren Orense	38	17	21	3018	3125	−107	
16	Baloncesto Salamanca	38	17	21	2881	2947	−66	
17	Valvi Girona	38	15	23	2886	2967	−81	Qualification to relegation playoffs
18	Pamesa Valencia	38	15	23	3060	3140	−80	Qualification to relegation playoffs
19	Somontano Huesca	38	12	26	2937	3138	−201	Qualification to relegation playoffs
20	Breogán	38	10	28	2942	3211	−269	Qualification to relegation playoffs

Source: ACB

== Playoffs ==
=== Championship playoffs ===
Quarterfinals
1	FC Barcelona	92	95	2
8	Festina Andorra	76	83	0
4	Real Madrid	75	77	83	2
5	Amway Zaragoza	69	94	67	1
2	Unicaja	83	79	2
7	Estudiantes CP	80	67	0
3	Taugrés	95	67	75	1
6	TDK Manresa	103	64	83	2

Semifinals
1	FC Barcelona	94	68	83	77	84	3
4	Real Madrid	65	75	68	82	65	2
2	Unicaja	80	87	89	3
6	TDK Manresa	62	79	72	0

Finals
1	FC Barcelona	77	93	87	80	73	3
2	Unicaja	84	92	88	78	64	2

Source: ACB

=== Relegation playoffs ===
Team 1	Series	Team 2	1st leg	2nd leg	3rd leg	4th leg	5th leg
Valvi Girona	3–2	Breogán	83–92	78–69	69–72	69–68	77–67
Pamesa Valencia	1–3	Somontano Huesca	80–92	98–68	69–81	89–90	—

Source: ACB

== Final standings ==
Pos	Team	Pld	W	L	Qualification or relegation
1	FC Barcelona Banca Catalana (C)	50	38	12	Qualification to European League
2	Unicaja	48	32	16	Qualification to European League
3	Real Madrid	46	27	19	Qualification to European League
4	TDK Manresa	44	23	21	Qualification to Korać Cup
5	Taugrés (Note: Taugrés qualified to European Cup by winning the Copa del Rey.) (X)	41	24	17	Qualification to European Cup
6	Amway Zaragoza	41	24	17	Qualification to Korać Cup
7	Estudiantes Caja Postal	40	20	20	Qualification to Korać Cup
8	Festina Andorra	40	20	20	Qualification to Korać Cup
9	Baloncesto León	38	19	19	
10	Caja San Fernando	38	19	19	
11	Fórum Valladolid	38	19	19	
12	Baloncesto Murcia	38	18	20	
13	Cáceres CB	38	17	21	
14	7Up Joventut	38	17	21	
15	Coren Orense	38	17	21	
16	Baloncesto Salamanca	38	17	21	
17	Valvi Girona	43	18	25	
18	Somontano Huesca	42	15	27	
19	Pamesa Valencia (R)	42	16	26	Relegation to Liga EBA
20	Breogán (R)	43	12	31	Relegation to Liga EBA

Source: ACB
(C) Champions; (R) Relegated; (X) Cup winners
