= 2017–18 CB Miraflores season =

Spanish sporting competition

San Pablo Burgos
2017–18 season
- Chairman: Félix Sancho
- Head coach: Diego Epifanio
- Arena: Coliseum Burgos
- Liga ACB: 14th
- PIR leader: (United States) Deon Thompson 15.9
- Scoring leader: (United States) John Jenkins 12.7
- Rebounding leader: (United States) Deon Thompson 6.7
- Assists leader: (Austria) Thomas Schreiner 3.6
- Highest home attendance: 9,352; Burgos 76–99 GBC (30 December 2017); Burgos 92–88 Real Betis (14 January 2018)
- Lowest home attendance: 8,531; Burgos 89–86 UCAM Murcia (11 November 2017)
- Average home attendance: 9,070
Home	Away	Third

The 2017–18 CB Miraflores season was the third in existence and their debut in the Liga ACB, the top flight of Spanish basketball, of this club, called San Pablo Burgos for sponsorship reasons.

== Overview ==
After several disappointments of different teams from the city of Burgos, that could not meet the requirements for promoting, San Pablo Burgos was finally admitted in the Liga ACB on 14 July 2017. As consequence of this and due to the requirement of the league to play in an arena of at least 5,000 seats, the club moved from Polideportivo El Plantío to the renovated bullring Coliseum Burgos.

The club made their debut on 1 October 2017, but they were defeated 65–81 at home by Iberostar Tenerife. After a streak of seven consecutive losses, including the matches against four of the five EuroLeague teams, the first win arrived on 11 November 2017 by beating UCAM Murcia at the Coliseum by 89–86.

On 3 December 2017, San Pablo Burgos won their first match away, against RETAbet Bilbao Basket by 62–78. Twenty days later, the team achieved the third win, the second one away, after beating direct rivals Divina Seguros Joventut by 81–88, thus allowing the club to remain at a distance of only one win for avoiding the relegation positions.

On 14 January 2018, and after earning two consecutive wins at MoraBanc Andorra and against Real Betis Energía Plus, after an overtime, San Pablo Burgos left for the first time in the season the relegation positions. Deon Thompson, with a Performance Index Rating of 31 in the second of these matches, was named MVP of the week. The streak would continue with a new win at Pabellón Príncipe Felipe, by defeating Tecnyconta Zaragoza with a 9/9 of Sebas Saiz.

San Pablo Burgos did not came back and ended the season with 13 wins in 34 matches, remaining in the ACB without options to be relegated since the 31st round.

== Players ==
=== Squad information ===
Note: Flags indicate national team eligibility at FIBA-sanctioned events. Players may hold other non-FIBA nationalities not displayed.

San Pablo Burgos roster
Players
Coaches

Pos.	No.	Nat.	Name	Ht.	Wt.	Age
SG	9	(Spain)	Barrera, Álex	1.96 m (6 ft 5 in)	82 kg (181 lb)	34 – 1 April 1992
C	31	(Slovenia)	Čančar, Vlatko	2.01 m (6 ft 7 in)	91 kg (201 lb)	29 – 10 April 1997
C	16	(Brazil)	dos Anjos, Felipe	2.18 m (7 ft 2 in)	114 kg (251 lb)	28 – 30 April 1998
PG	0	(United States)	Fisher, Corey	1.85 m (6 ft 1 in)	84 kg (185 lb)	38 – 8 April 1988
SF	13	(Lithuania)	Gailius, Deividas	2.00 m (6 ft 7 in)	92 kg (203 lb)	38 – 26 April 1988
C	23	(Serbia)	Huskić, Goran	2.10 m (6 ft 11 in)	102 kg (225 lb)	34 – 26 March 1992
SG	12	(United States)	Jenkins, John	1.93 m (6 ft 4 in)	98 kg (216 lb)	35 – 6 March 1991
SG	25	(Spain)	López, Álex	1.89 m (6 ft 2 in)	89 kg (196 lb)	35 – 8 May 1991
SF	15	(Spain)	Martínez, Edu	2.00 m (6 ft 7 in)	98 kg (216 lb)	36 – 5 May 1990
PF	11	(Spain)	Saiz, Sebas	2.05 m (6 ft 9 in)	109 kg (240 lb)	32 – 15 June 1994
PG	5	(Austria)	Schreiner, Thomas	1.95 m (6 ft 5 in)	88 kg (194 lb)	39 – 3 February 1987
PF	21	(United States)	Thompson, Deon	2.03 m (6 ft 8 in)	111 kg (245 lb)	37 – 16 September 1988
PF	10	(Spain)	Vega, Javi (C)	2.05 m (6 ft 9 in)	100 kg (220 lb)	38 – 5 January 1988

Head coach

- (Spain) Diego Epifanio

Assistant coach(es)

- (Spain) Fran Hernández
- (Spain) Alberto Codeso

Legend

- (C) Team captain
- Injured

- Roster
- Transactions
Updated: March 13, 2018

=== In ===
No.	Pos.	Nat.	Name	Age	Moving from		Type	Ends	Transfer fee	Date	Source
5	PG	(Austria)	Thomas Schreiner	30	MoraBanc Andorra	(Spain)	Transfer	June 2018	Free	1 August 2017	
0	PG	(United States)	Corey Fisher	29	Lietuvos rytas	(Lithuania)	Transfer	June 2018	Free	4 August 2017	
13	SF	(Lithuania)	Deividas Gailius	29	Lietuvos rytas	(Lithuania)	Transfer	June 2018	Free	10 August 2017	
16	C	(Brazil)	Felipe dos Anjos	19	Real Madrid (Note: Played the previous season loaned at Unión Financiera Baloncesto Oviedo.)	(Spain)	Loan	June 2018	Free	15 August 2017	
21	PF	(United States)	Deon Thompson	28	Crvena zvezda mts	(Serbia)	Transfer	June 2018	Free	19 August 2017	
11	PF	(Spain)	Sebas Saiz	23	Real Madrid	(Spain)	Loan	June 2018	Free	30 August 2017	
8	SF	(Lithuania)	Tadas Sedekerskis	19	Baskonia	(Spain)	Loan	June 2018	Free	1 September 2017	
	SF	(Estonia)	Robert Valge	20	Venta de Baños	(Spain)	Transfer	June 2020	Free	11 September 2017	
12	SG	(United States)	John Jenkins	26	Westchester Knicks	(United States)	Transfer	June 2018	Free	7 November 2017	
31	SF	(Slovenia)	Vlatko Čančar	20	Mega	(Serbia)	Loan	June 2018	Free	13 March 2018	

=== Out ===
No.	Pos.	Nat.	Name	Age	Moving to		Type	Transfer fee	Date	Source
	SF	(Estonia)	Robert Valge	20	Extremadura Plasencia	(Spain)	Loan	Free	11 September 2017	
8	SF	(Lithuania)	Tadas Sedekerskis	19	Baskonia (Note: On loan to Nevėžis.)	(Spain)	Loan return	Free	16 December 2017	
3	PG	(Iceland)	Ægir Steinarsson	26	TAU Castelló	(Spain)	End of contract	Free		
6	PG	(United Kingdom)	Morayo Soluade	22	Unicaja	(Spain)	Loan return	Free		
1	SF	(United States)	Brandon Brine	25			End of contract	Free		
12	PF	(Spain)	Jorge García	25	Montemar	(Spain)	End of contract	Free		
13	C	(Croatia)	Filip Tončinić	25	Mahram Tehran	(Iran)	End of contract	Free		

== Club ==
=== Technical staff ===
Position	Staff
Head coach	Diego Epifanio
Assistant coach	Francisco J. Hernández; Alberto Codeso
Delegate	Raúl Santamaría
Fitness trainer	Dani Hernández

Source: CB Miraflores

== Competitions ==
=== Liga ACB ===
==== League table ====
Pos	Team	Pld	W	L	PF	PA	PD
12	Monbus Obradoiro	34	14	20	2650	2742	−92
13	Delteco GBC	34	13	21	2742	2854	−112
14	San Pablo Burgos	34	13	21	2775	2961	−186
15	Divina Seguros Joventut	34	12	22	2709	2831	−122
16	Tecnyconta Zaragoza	34	10	24	2780	3006	−226

Source: ACB

==== Results summary ====
Overall						Home					Away				
Pld	W	L	PF	PA	PD	W	L	PF	PA	PD	W	L	PF	PA	PD
34	13	21	2775	2961	−186	6	11	1421	1505	−84	7	10	1354	1456	−102

Source: ACB.com

==== Results by round ====
Round	1	2	3	4	5	6	7	8	9	10	11	12	13	14	15	16	17	18	19	20	21	22	23	24	25	26	27	28	29	30	31	32	33	34
Ground	H	A	A	H	A	H	A	H	H	A	A	H	A	H	A	H	A	H	A	H	A	A	H	A	H	A	H	A	H	A	H	H	A	H
Result	L	L	L	L	L	L	L	W	L	W	L	L	W	L	W	W	W	L	L	L	L	L	L	L	W	W	W	W	L	W	W	L	L	W
Position	18	17	18	18	18	18	18	17	17	17	17	17	17	18	17	16	15	15	16	16	16	16	16	16	16	15	14	14	14	14	14	14	14	14

Source: ACB.com
A = Away; H = Home; W = Win; L = Loss

==== Matches ====
1 October 2017 1	San Pablo Burgos	65–81	Iberostar Tenerife	Burgos
12:30	Scoring by quarter: 16–19, 10–19, 19–19, 20–24
	Pts: Thompson 13; Rebs: Saiz, Thompson 7 Asts: Fisher, Gailius 3 PIR: Thompson 24	Boxscore	Pts: Beirán, Tobey 15; Rebs: Tobey 10; Asts: White 4 PIR: Vázquez 23	Arena: Coliseum Burgos; Attendance: 8,817; Referees: Peruga, Manuel, Torres

5 October 2017 2	Unicaja	93–72	San Pablo Burgos	Málaga
21:30	Scoring by quarter: 32–18, 33–14, 18–16, 10–24
	Pts: Díaz 14; Rebs: Augustine 7 Asts: Nedović 6 PIR: Brooks 21	Boxscore	Pts: Fisher, Martínez 11; Rebs: Gailius 10; Asts: Schreiner 5 PIR: Fisher 12	Arena: José María Martín Carpena; Attendance: 6,515; Referees: Perea, Fernández, Mas Cagide

8 October 2017 3	FC Barcelona Lassa	111–81	San Pablo Burgos	Barcelona
12:30	Scoring by quarter: 29–18, 27–23, 28–26, 27–14
	Pts: Ribas 21; Rebs: Moerman, Oriola 6 Asts: Heurtel 10; PIR: Oriola 26	Boxscore	Pts: Fisher, Huskić 13; Rebs: Sedekerskis, Thompson 4 Asts: Fisher 5 PIR: López 19	Arena: Palau Blaugrana; Attendance: 3,581; Referees: Pérez Pizarro, Aliaga, Olivares

14 October 2017 4	San Pablo Burgos	72–87	Movistar Estudiantes	Burgos
20:00	Scoring by quarter: 18–25, 21–21, 16–18, 17–23
	Pts: Huskić 18; Rebs: Thompson 11; Asts: three players 3 PIR: Thompson 13	Boxscore	Pts: Caner-Medley 15; Rebs: Brown 5 Asts: Cook 12; PIR: Cook 20	Arena: Coliseum Burgos; Attendance: 8,875; Referees: Jiménez, Castillo, Arnau Padrós

21 October 2017 5	Monbus Obradoiro	94–69	San Pablo Burgos	Santiago de Compostela
20:00	Scoring by quarter: 29–6, 23–24, 20–18, 22–21
	Pts: Thomas 20; Rebs: Pustovyi 11; Asts: Pozas 6 PIR: Thomas 24	Boxscore	Pts: Thompson 16; Rebs: Thompson 9 Asts: Scheiner 3 PIR: Thompson 23	Arena: Fontes do Sar; Attendance: 4,925; Referees: García González, Calatrava, Sánchez Mohedas

28 October 2017 6	San Pablo Burgos	95–100	Real Madrid	Burgos
20:00	Scoring by quarter: 17-18, 28-21, 28-29, 22-32
	Pts: Thompson 20; Rebs: Gailius 6 Asts: Schreiner 7 PIR: Thompson 19	Boxscore	Pts: Campazzo 17; Rebs: Mačiulis, Ayón 6 Asts: Campazzo 4 PIR: Campazzo 24	Arena: Coliseum Burgos; Attendance: 9,234; Referees: Martín Bertrán, Serrano, Sánchez Sixto

5 November 2017 7	Valencia Basket	87–78	San Pablo Burgos	Valencia
18:00	Scoring by quarter: 23–15, 22–19, 20–24, 22–20
	Pts: Green 21; Rebs: Dubljević 9 Asts: Van Rossom 6 PIR: Dubljević 22	Boxscore	Pts: Gailius, Thompson 17; Rebs: López, Sedekerskis 5 Asts: Fisher 4 PIR: Thompson 22	Arena: Fuente de San Luis; Attendance: 8,500; Referees: Cortés, García Ortiz, Mendoza

11 November 2017 8	San Pablo Burgos	89–86	UCAM Murcia	Burgos
20:00	Scoring by quarter: 18–23, 26–20, 14–20, 31–23
	Pts: Huskić 18; Rebs: Huskić 6 Asts: Schreiner 5 PIR: Huskić 26	Boxscore	Pts: Hannah 19; Rebs: Rojas 9 Asts: Hannah 4 PIR: Hannah 20	Arena: Coliseum Burgos; Attendance: 8,531; Referees: Pérez Pérez, Martínez, Fernández

19 November 2017 9	San Pablo Burgos	76–100	Baskonia	Burgos
12:30	Scoring by quarter: 23–24, 21–33, 11–18, 21–25
	Pts: Gailius 15; Rebs: Huskić 6 Asts: López, Schreiner 3 PIR: Huskić, Gailius 18	Boxscore	Pts: Shengelia 18; Rebs: Poirier, Shengelia 8 Asts: Granger 9 PIR: Shengelia 27	Arena: Coliseum Burgos; Attendance: 9,253; Referees: Pérez Pizarro, Oyón, Munar

3 December 2017 10	RETAbet Bilbao Basket	62–78	San Pablo Burgos	Bilbao
12:30	Scoring by quarter: 18–18, 11–15, 20–23, 13–22
	Pts: Mumbrú 16; Rebs: Mumbrú, Tomàs 7 Asts: Fischer 3 PIR: Tomàs 15	Boxscore	Pts: Fisher 24; Rebs: three players 5 Asts: Huskić 3 PIR: Fisher 26	Arena: Bilbao Arena; Attendance: 9,806; Referees: Peruga, Bultó, Padrós

10 December 2017 11	Herbalife Gran Canaria	87–80	San Pablo Burgos	Las Palmas
13:00	Scoring by quarter: 22–16, 24–26, 15–22, 26–16
	Pts: Eriksson 17; Rebs: Balvín 8 Asts: Paulí 5 PIR: Balvín 25	Boxscore	Pts: Jenkins 25; Rebs: Thompson 7 Asts: Schreiner 6 PIR: Jenkins 28	Arena: Gran Canaria Arena; Attendance: 5,347; Referees: Conde, Aliaga, Zamorano

16 December 2017 12	San Pablo Burgos	69–71	Montakit Fuenlabrada	Burgos
20:00	Scoring by quarter: 18–11, 19–15, 16–28, 16–17
	Pts: Thompson 16; Rebs: Huskić 6 Asts: Huskić 5 PIR: Huskić 17	Boxscore	Pts: Popović 23; Rebs: Sekulić, Šmits 11; Asts: Vargas 3 PIR: Popović 18	Arena: Coliseum Burgos; Attendance: 8,783; Referees: García González, Rial, Mas

23 December 2017 13	Divina Seguros Joventut	81–88	San Pablo Burgos	Badalona
20:00	Scoring by quarter: 20–15, 22–22, 27–27, 12–24
	Pts: Wayns 18; Rebs: Jordan 11; Asts: Richard 5 PIR: Jordan 23	Boxscore	Pts: Thompson 18; Rebs: Thompson 7 Asts: López 4 PIR: Thompson 18	Arena: Palau Olímpic; Attendance: 4,886; Referees: Jiménez, Serrano, Sánchez Sixto

30 December 2017 14	San Pablo Burgos	76–99	Delteco GBC	Burgos
20:00	Scoring by quarter: 20–20, 15–27, 21–33, 20–19
	Pts: Jenkins 14; Rebs: Saiz 5 Asts: Schreiner, Thompson 4 PIR: Fisher 15	Boxscore	Pts: Chery 17; Rebs: Agbelese 8 Asts: Van Lacke 6 PIR: Van Lacke 23	Arena: Coliseum Burgos; Attendance: 9,352; Referees: Hierrezuelo, Fernández, Sacristán

6 January 2018 15	MoraBanc Andorra	91–99	San Pablo Burgos	Andorra la Vella, Andorra
21:00	Scoring by quarter: 19–23, 17–27, 28–29, 27–20
	Pts: Fernández 16; Rebs: Stević 10; Asts: Fernández 6 PIR: Stević 22	Boxscore	Pts: Jenkins 19; Rebs: Gailius 7 Asts: Huskić 5 PIR: Jenkins 18	Arena: Poliesportiu d'Andorra; Attendance: 4,140; Referees: Calatrava, Oyón, Martínez

14 January 2018 16	San Pablo Burgos	92–88(OT)	Real Betis Energía Plus	Burgos
12:30	Scoring by quarter: 23–18, 14–22, 15–23, 28–17, Overtime: 12–8
	Pts: Thompson 25; Rebs: Gailius, Thompson 9 Asts: López 6 PIR: Thompson 31	Boxscore	Pts: Kelly 25; Rebs: Anosike, Schilb 6 Asts: Draper 7 PIR: Kelly 28	Arena: Coliseum Burgos; Attendance: 9,253; Referees: Jiménez, Araña, Sánchez Montserrat

21 January 2018 17	Tecnyconta Zaragoza	73–79	San Pablo Burgos	Zaragoza
18:30	Scoring by quarter: 12–28, 18–18, 17–13, 16–20
	Pts: Neal 18; Rebs: Varnado 7 Asts: Bellas 5 PIR: Neal, Varnado 15	Boxscore	Pts: Saiz 19; Rebs: Thompson 9 Asts: Fisher 6 PIR: Saiz 18	Arena: Príncipe Felipe; Attendance: 8,833; Referees: Pérez Pérez, Manuel, Caballero

27 January 2018 18	San Pablo Burgos	78–85	Unicaja	Burgos
20:00	Scoring by quarter: 19–18, 22–23, 16–26, 21–18
	Pts: Jenkins 16; Rebs: Saiz, Thompson 7 Asts: Jenkins 5 PIR: Saiz 21	Boxscore	Pts: three players 14; Rebs: Augustine 9 Asts: Salin 7 PIR: Augustine, Díez 19	Arena: Coliseum Burgos; Attendance: 9,122; Referees: Peruga, Aliaga, Olivares

3 February 2018 19	Iberostar Tenerife	84–76	San Pablo Burgos	San Cristóbal de La Laguna
20:00	Scoring by quarter: 19–16, 18–17, 22–21, 25–22
	Pts: Vázquez 19; Rebs: Vázquez 8 Asts: Beirán 7 PIR: Vázquez 29	Boxscore	Pts: Thompson 19; Rebs: Thompson 12; Asts: Schreiner 5 PIR: Thompson 27	Arena: Santiago Martín; Attendance: 4,166; Referees: Cortés, Perea, Sacristán

11 February 2018 20	San Pablo Burgos	76–90	Valencia Basket	Burgos
12:30	Scoring by quarter: 19–16, 20–28, 18–27, 17–19
	Pts: Huskić 15; Rebs: Thompson 10; Asts: Fisher, López 6 PIR: Thompson 21	Boxscore	Pts: Green 22; Rebs: Pleiß 7 Asts: Abalde 5 PIR: Green 23	Arena: Coliseum Burgos; Attendance: 9,112; Referees: García González, García Ortiz, Torres

4 March 2018 21	Real Madrid	96–81	San Pablo Burgos	Madrid
12:30	Scoring by quarter: 28–13, 25–18, 21–28, 22–22
	Pts: Carroll 18; Rebs: Tavares 13; Asts: Dončić 5 PIR: Tavares 27	Boxscore	Pts: López 16; Rebs: Huskić 9 Asts: López 5 PIR: López 25	Arena: WiZink Center; Attendance: 8,604; Referees: Martín Bertán, Caballero, Munar

11 March 2018 22	UCAM Murcia	67–64	San Pablo Burgos	Murcia
12:30	Scoring by quarter: 16–16, 16–18, 18–9, 17–21
	Pts: Benite 16; Rebs: Tumba 7 Asts: three players 2 PIR: Urtasun 11	Boxscore	Pts: Fisher 15; Rebs: Thompson 11; Asts: Fisher 4 PIR: Thompson 18	Arena: Palacio de Deportes; Attendance: 5,089; Referees: Pérez Pérez, Oyón, Sánchez Mohedas

18 March 2018 23	San Pablo Burgos	101–103(OT)	FC Barcelona Lassa	Burgos
18:30	Scoring by quarter: 15–20, 35–19, 20–24, 19–26, Overtime: 12–14
	Pts: Saiz, Vega 18; Rebs: Thompson 11; Asts: five players 3 PIR: Saiz 27	Boxscore	Pts: Heurtel 26; Rebs: Tomić 8 Asts: Heurtel 13; PIR: Heurtel 37	Arena: Coliseum Burgos; Attendance: 8,985; Referees: Hierrezuelo, Castillo, Mendoza

25 March 2018 24	Movistar Estudiantes	100–76	San Pablo Burgos	Madrid
12:30	Scoring by quarter: 27–21, 27–9, 25–29, 21–17
	Pts: Landesberg 26; Rebs: Suton 9 Asts: Cook 9 PIR: Landesberg 31	Boxscore	Pts: Jenkins 14; Rebs: Thompson 6 Asts: Jenkins 6 PIR: Jenkins 18	Arena: WiZink Center; Attendance: 9,213; Referees: Jiménez, Rial, Sánchez Montserrat

1 April 2018 25	San Pablo Burgos	86–77	Monbus Obradoiro	Burgos
12:30	Scoring by quarter: 17–17, 19–20, 27–20, 23–20
	Pts: Fisher 22; Rebs: Saiz 11; Asts: Fisher, Schreiner 3 PIR: Fisher, Thompson 19	Boxscore	Pts: Sàbat 17; Rebs: Radović 9 Asts: Sàbat, Simons 3 PIR: Bendžius 20	Arena: Coliseum Burgos; Attendance: 8,875; Referees: García González, Bultó, Zamorano

8 April 2018 26	Montakit Fuenlabrada	69–79	San Pablo Burgos	Fuenlabrada
12:30	Scoring by quarter: 16–18, 20–26, 19–24, 14–11
	Pts: Cruz 16; Rebs: Šmits 8 Asts: Šmits, Vargas 2 PIR: Šmits 17	Boxscore	Pts: Thompson 12; Rebs: Thompson 11; Asts: Schreiner 5 PIR: Thompson 24	Arena: Fernando Martín; Attendance: 5,149; Referees: Martín Bertrán, Serrano, Mas

11 April 2018 27	San Pablo Burgos	92–86	MoraBanc Andorra	Burgos
20:30	Scoring by quarter: 16–20, 15–22, 27–18, 34–26
	Pts: Fisher 19; Rebs: Thompson 8 Asts: Fisher 5 PIR: Fisher 25	Boxscore	Pts: Fernández 15; Rebs: Diagne, Janković 5 Asts: Albicy 5 PIR: Diagne, Janković 16	Arena: Coliseum Burgos; Attendance: 8,733; Referees: Conde, García Ortiz, Sánchez Sixto

15 April 2018 28	Real Betis Energía Plus	96–101	San Pablo Burgos	Seville
12:30	Scoring by quarter: 33–21, 21–28, 22–27, 20–25
	Pts: Booker 30; Rebs: Anosike 10; Asts: Booker 4 PIR: Booker 27	Boxscore	Pts: Huskić 17; Rebs: Huskić, Thompson 6 Asts: Fisher 5 PIR: Huskić 22	Arena: San Pablo; Attendance: 4,419; Referees: Pérez Pizarro, Perea, Caballero

22 April 2018 29	San Pablo Burgos	79–80	Divina Seguros Joventut	Burgos
12:30	Scoring by quarter: 19–22, 27–21, 19–24, 14–13
	Pts: Jenkins 16; Rebs: Huskić 7 Asts: Schreiner 7 PIR: Jenkins 20	Boxscore	Pts: Kulveitis 17; Rebs: Conger 6 Asts: Laprovíttola 9 PIR: Conger, Kulveitis 20	Arena: Coliseum Burgos; Attendance: 9,320; Referees: Hierrezuelo, Castillo, Torres

29 April 2018 30	Delteco GBC	63–71	San Pablo Burgos	San Sebastián
18:00	Scoring by quarter: 9–18, 15–16, 24–17, 15–20
	Pts: Fakuade 12; Rebs: Fakuade 12; Asts: Swing 3 PIR: Fakuade 18	Boxscore	Pts: Jenkins 17; Rebs: López 7 Asts: Schreiner 3 PIR: Saiz 12	Arena: Donostia Arena; Attendance: 4,205; Referees: García González, Calatrava, Mendoza

6 May 2018 31	San Pablo Burgos	96–88	Tecnyconta Zaragoza	Burgos
12:30	Scoring by quarter: 19–18, 30–20, 26–14, 21–36
	Pts: Jenkins 17; Rebs: Saiz 10; Asts: four players 3 PIR: Gailius, Saiz 19	Boxscore	Pts: Ennis 17; Rebs: Rey 8 Asts: Bellas 4 PIR: De Jong 15	Arena: Coliseum Burgos; Attendance: 9,320; Referees: Jiménez Trujillo, Perea, Sánchez Mohedas

12 May 2018 32	San Pablo Burgos	89–98	Herbalife Gran Canaria	Burgos
20:00	Scoring by quarter: 25–23, 18–20, 26–27, 20–28
	Pts: Saiz 15; Rebs: Thompson 9 Asts: Schreiner 10; PIR: López 20	Boxscore	Pts: Seeley 18; Rebs: Balvín 8 Asts: Mekel 4 PIR: Aguilar 22	Arena: Coliseum Burgos; Attendance: 9,235; Referees: Martín Bertrán, Aliaga, Padrós

19 May 2018 33	Kirolbet Baskonia	102–82	San Pablo Burgos	Vitoria-Gasteiz
19:00	Scoring by quarter: 26–13, 20–20, 23–29, 33–16
	Pts: Beaubois 20; Rebs: Diop 6 Asts: Huertas 6 PIR: Beaubois 30	Boxscore	Pts: Fisher 13; Rebs: Huskić 8 Asts: three players 3 PIR: Huskić 16	Arena: Fernando Buesa Arena; Attendance: 11,128; Referees: Calatrava, Serrano, Sacristán

24 May 2018 34	San Pablo Burgos	90–86	RETAbet Bilbao Basket	Burgos
20:30	Scoring by quarter: 30–21, 18–24, 17–17, 25–24
	Pts: Thompson 16; Rebs: Thompson 8 Asts: Schreiner 5 PIR: Thompson 21	Boxscore	Pts: Mumbrú 26; Rebs: Thomas 7 Asts: Mumbrú 5 PIR: Mumbrú 29	Arena: Coliseum Burgos; Attendance: 9,297; Referees: Peruga, Oyón, Mendoza

== Statistics ==
Legend
GP	Games played	GS	Games started	MPG	Minutes per game
FG%	Field-goal percentage	3FG%	3-point field-goal percentage	FT%	Free-throw percentage
RPG	Rebounds per game	APG	Assists per game	SPG	Steals per game
BPG	Blocks per game	PPG	Points per game	PIR	PIR per game

Player	GP	GS	MPG	2FG%	3FG%	FT%	RPG	APG	SPG	BPG	PPG	PIR
Álex Barrera	30	6	12.8	.557	.347	.770	1.4	0.8	0.5	0.0	4.5	4.0
Vlatko Čančar	12	6	19.5	.543	.342	1.000	2.9	0.4	0.8	0.0	7.2	4.7
Felipe dos Anjos	4	0	4.0	.400	.000	1.000	1.3	0.0	0.0	0.3	1.5	1.5
Corey Fisher	34	31	23.9	.510	.343	.700	1.6	2.6	0.8	0.0	10.8	9.5
Deividas Gailius	22	17	21.2	.514	.321	.690	4.1	1.1	0.5	0.0	10.4	9.4
Goran Huskić	34	27	20.6	.550	.250	.610	4.3	2.4	1.1	0.5	9.1	10.2
John Jenkins	22	13	22.9	.532	.349	.960	2.0	1.3	0.6	0.2	12.7	9.9
Álex López	34	20	20.0	.512	.278	.810	2.5	2.2	1.0	0.2	6.9	7.7
Edu Martínez	30	3	11.6	.522	.424	1.000	1.0	0.3	0.2	0.0	4.8	2.6
Sebas Saiz	34	3	18.0	.583	.167	.760	4.9	0.4	0.5	0.9	9.1	10.9
Emil Savić	2	0	0.0	.000	–	–	0.0	0.0	0.0	0.0	0.0	–1.0
Thomas Schreiner	34	3	16.9	.520	.247	.820	1.2	3.6	0.6	0.1	3.9	4.5
Tadas Sedekerskis	8	2	10.6	.455	.000	.500	2.9	0.6	0.4	0.1	1.6	4.9
Deon Thompson	34	34	27.2	.520	.412	.790	6.7	1.5	0.9	0.9	11.9	15.8
Javi Vega	34	5	14.9	.364	.284	.850	1.8	0.7	0.4	0.1	3.6	2.2

Source: ACB
