= 2009–10 ACB season =

- League: Liga ACB
- Sport: Basketball
- Duration: October 10, 2009 – May 16, 2010
- Games: 340 (regular season); 20 (playoffs)
- Teams: 18
- TV partner: Televisión Española

Regular Season
- Season champions: Regal Barcelona
- Season MVP: (Brazil) Tiago Splitter (Caja Laboral)
- Top scorer: (United States) Jaycee Carroll (Gran Canaria 2014)

Playoffs

ACB Finals
- Champions: Caja Laboral
- Runners-up: FC Barcelona
- Finals MVP: (Brazil) Tiago Splitter (Caja Laboral)

ACB seasons
- ← 2008–09 2010–11 →

The 2009–10 ACB season was the 27th season of the Liga ACB. The regular season began on Saturday, October 10, 2009, and ended on Sunday, May 16, 2010.

== Team Standings ==
Direct access to 2010–11 Euroleague via league position
Received berth to 2010–11 Euroleague by winning the 2009–10 Eurocup
Clinched playoff berth
Relegated

Italics indicate holder of a Euroleague "A License", giving the team automatic access to the 2010–11 Euroleague Regular Season regardless of league placement.

Final standings:

#	Teams	GP	W	L	PF	PA
1	Regal FC Barcelona	34	31	3	2736	2202
2	Caja Laboral	34	27	7	2734	2484
3	Real Madrid	34	27	7	2762	2442
4	Power Electronics Valencia	34	23	11	2637	2563
5	Unicaja	34	19	15	2721	2545
6	Cajasol	34	19	15	2406	2334
7	Asefa Estudiantes	34	19	15	2672	2621
8	Gran Canaria 2014	34	17	17	2560	2544
9	Bizkaia Bilbao Basket	34	16	18	2538	2551
10	CB Granada	34	15	19	2622	2690
11	DKV Joventut	34	15	19	2639	2712
12	Suzuki Manresa	34	14	20	2440	2563
13	Blancos de Rueda Valladolid	34	13	21	2484	2631
14	Lagun Aro GBC	34	13	21	2500	2667
15	Meridiano Alicante	34	13	21	2563	2696
16	Ayuda en Acción Fuenlabrada	34	12	22	2549	2733
17	Xacobeo Blu:sens	34	8	26	2520	2814
18	CB Murcia	34	5	29	2499	2790

Last updated: May 19, 2010.
Source: ACB

== Playoffs ==
Quarter Finals
1	Regal FC Barcelona	2
8	Gran Canaria 2014	0
4	Power Electronics Valencia	0
5	Unicaja	2
2	Caja Laboral	2
7	Asefa Estudiantes	0
3	Real Madrid	2
6	Cajasol	1

SemiFinals
1	Regal FC Barcelona	3
5	Unicaja	0
2	Caja Laboral	3
3	Real Madrid	2

Finals
1	Regal FC Barcelona	0
2	Caja Laboral	3

== Stats Leaders ==
Finals Stats

=== Points ===
Rank	Name	Team	Points	Games	PPG
1.	(United States) Jaycee Carroll	Gran Canaria 2014	649	34	19,1
2.	(United States) Gerald Fitch	Ayuda en acción Fuenlabrada	466	26	17,9
3.	(Serbia) Miloš Vujanić	CB Murcia	602	34	17,7
4.	(United States) Clay Tucker	DKV Joventut	533	33	16,2
5.	(Greece) Kostas Vasileiadis	Xacobeo Blu:sens	400	25	16,0

=== Rebounds ===
Rank	Name	Team	Rebounds	Games	RPG
1.	(Uruguay) Esteban Batista	Ayuda en acción Fuenlabrada	259	31	8,35
2.	(Brazil) Paulo Prestes	CB Murcia	204	28	7,29
3.	(France) Tariq Kirksay	Cajasol	237	33	7,18
4.	(United States) James Augustine	Gran Canaria 2014	242	34	7,12
5.	(United States) Richard Hendrix	CB Granada	235	34	6,91

=== Assists ===
Rank	Name	Team	Assists	Games	APG
1.	(United States) Omar Cook	Unicaja Málaga	204	34	6,00
2.	(Argentina) Maximiliano Stanic	Xacobeo Blu:Sens	151	29	5,21
3.	(Brazil) Marcelinho Huertas	Caja Laboral	133	27	4,93
4.	(Spain) Ricky Rubio	Regal FC Barcelona	150	34	4,41
5.	(Latvia) Kristaps Valters	DKV Joventut	143	33	4,33

== Awards ==
=== Regular season MVP ===
- Tiago Splitter – Caja Laboral

=== All-ACB team ===
Position	Player	Team
PG	(Spain) Ricky Rubio	Regal FC Barcelona
SG	(Spain) Juan Carlos Navarro	Regal FC Barcelona
SF	(Spain) Carlos Suárez	Asefa Estudiantes
PF	(Slovenia) Erazem Lorbek	Regal FC Barcelona
C	(Brazil) Tiago Splitter	Caja Laboral

=== Best Coach ===
- Xavi Pascual – Regal FC Barcelona

=== ACB Rising Star Award ===
- Richard Hendrix – CB Granada

=== MVP Week by Week ===
Date	Player	Team	Efficiency
1	(Uruguay) Esteban Batista	Ayuda en acción Fuenlabrada	31
2	(United States) Gerald Fitch	Ayuda en acción Fuenlabrada (2)	37
3	(United States) Chris Moss (United States) Chris Thomas	CB Murcia; Ayuda en acción Fuenlabrada (3)	32
4	(United States) Gerald Fitch (2)	Ayuda en acción Fuenlabrada (4)	44
5	(Spain) Rafa Martínez	Power Electronics Valencia	24
6	(Bosnia and Herzegovina) Mirza Teletović	Caja Laboral	34
7	(Spain) Román Montañez	Suzuki Manresa	36
8	(Serbia) Novica Veličković	Real Madrid	36
9	(Uruguay) Esteban Batista (2)	Ayuda en acción Fuenlabrada (5)	29
10	(Spain) Rafa Martínez (2)	Power Electronics Valencia (2)	36
11	(Croatia) Marko Banić	Bizkaia Bilbao Basket	25
12	(United States) Tariq Kirksay	Cajasol	30
13	(Brazil) Rafael Hettsheimeir	Xacobeo Blu:Sens	35
14	(Australia) Joe Ingles	CB Granada	40
15	(United States) Gerald Fitch (3)	Ayuda en acción Fuenlabrada (6)	42
16	(Argentina) Diego García	Blancos de Rueda Valladolid	47
17	(United States) Clay Tucker	DKV Joventut	44
18	(United States) Chris Lofton	Asefa Estudiantes	28
19	(United States) Gerald Fitch (4)	Ayuda en acción Fuenlabrada (7)	30
20	(Australia) Joe Ingles (2)	CB Granada (2)	34
21	(France) Nando De Colo	Power Electronics Valencia (3)	37
22	(Belgium) Axel Hervelle	Bizkaia Bilbao Basket (2)	36
23	(Argentina) Federico Van Lacke	Blancos de Rueda Valladolid (2)	33
24	(Spain) Carlos Suárez	Asefa Estudiantes (2)	35
25	(Greece) Kostas Vasileiadis	Xacobeo Blu:Sens (2)	35
26	(Uruguay) Esteban Batista (3)	Ayuda en acción Fuenlabrada (8)	33
27	(Australia) Matt Nielsen	Power Electronics Valencia (4)	32
28	(Spain) Juan Carlos Navarro	Regal FC Barcelona	32
29	(United States) Jaycee Carroll	Gran Canaria 2014	31
30	(Serbia) Dusko Savanovic	Cajasol (2)	40
31	(Spain) Álex Mumbrú	Bizkaia Bilbao Basket (3)	37
32	(Spain) Txemi Urtasun	Meridiano Alicante	26
33	(Argentina) Juanpi Gutiérrez	CB Granada (3)	31
34	(Serbia) Milos Vujanic	CB Murcia (2)	32

Last updated: May 16, 2010.
Source: ACB

=== Player of the month ===
Month	Week	Player	Team	Efficiency	
October	1–5	(United States) Gerald Fitch	Ayuda en acción Fuenlabrada	24,2	Archived February 2, 2014, at the Wayback Machine
November	6–10	(Serbia) Novica Veličković	Real Madrid	19,6	Archived February 2, 2014, at the Wayback Machine
December	11–15	(United States) Clay Tucker	DKV Joventut	22,8	Archived February 2, 2014, at the Wayback Machine
January	16–20	(Argentina) Federico Van Lacke	Blancos de Rueda Valladolid	22,4	Archived September 30, 2015, at the Wayback Machine
February	21–23	(United States) Omar Cook	Unicaja	20	Archived February 2, 2014, at the Wayback Machine
March	24–27	(Spain) Carlos Suárez	Asefa Estudiantes	23,75	Archived February 2, 2014, at the Wayback Machine
April	28–31	(Brazil) Tiago Splitter	Caja Laboral	27,7	Archived February 2, 2014, at the Wayback Machine
May	31–34	(United States) Nik Caner-Medley	Asefa Estudiantes	22,7	Archived February 2, 2014, at the Wayback Machine

Last updated: May 1, 2010.
Source: ACB
