= Thomas Schreiner =

Thomas Schreiner may refer to:

- Thomas R. Schreiner (born 1954), American biblical scholar
- Thomas Schreiner (basketball) (born 1987), Austrian basketball player
- Thomas "Jumbo" Schreiner, German actor and presenter
