= 2010 ACB Playoffs =

The 2010 ACB Playoffs were the final phase of the 2009–10 ACB season. It started on Thursday, 20 May 2010 and ended on 15 June 2010. Caja Laboral won the final series 3–0 against Regal FC Barcelona.

== Bracket ==
Quarter Finals
1	Regal FC Barcelona	2
8	Gran Canaria 2014	0
4	Power Electronics Valencia	0
5	Unicaja	2
2	Caja Laboral	2
7	Asefa Estudiantes	0
3	Real Madrid	2
6	Cajasol	1

SemiFinals
1	Regal FC Barcelona	3
5	Unicaja	0
2	Caja Laboral	3
3	Real Madrid	2

Finals
1	Regal FC Barcelona	0
2	Caja Laboral	3

== Quarterfinals ==
The quarterfinals were best-of-3 series.

=== Regal FC Barcelona vs. Gran Canaria 2014 ===
21 May
21:00 CEST

Report

Regal FC Barcelona	85–53	Gran Canaria 2014
Scoring by quarter: 14–10, 25–8, 24–23, 22–12
Pts: Mickeal 17; Rebs: Vázquez, Mickeal 5 Asts: Rubio, Lakovič 5		Pts: McDonald 21; Rebs: Augustine 7 Asts: Moran 3

Palau Blaugrana
Attendance: 5506
Referees: Fco. De La Maza, J.R. García Ortiz, Carlos Cortés

23 May
12:30 CEST

Report

Gran Canaria 2014	47–65	Regal FC Barcelona
Scoring by quarter: 4–18, 15–13, 12–18, 16-16
Pts: Caroll 11; Rebs: Savane 8 Asts: Bellas, Norris, Caroll 2		Pts: Navarro 16; Rebs: Morris 7 Asts: Rubio 6
Barcelona wins Series 2–0

Centro Insular de Deportes
Attendance: 4932
Referees: Daniel Hierrezuelo, José Javier Murgui, Carlos Peruga

=== Power Electronics Valencia vs. Unicaja ===
21 May
21:00 CEST

Report

Power Electronics Valencia	82–83	Unicaja
Scoring by quarter: 19–30, 27–16, 18–17, 18–20
Pts: Claver, Kelati 13; Rebs: Perović 13; Asts: Nielsen 7		Pts: Neal, Cook 20; Rebs: Jiménez 6 Asts: Rodríguez, Cook 5

Fuente de San Luis
Attendance: 8200
Referees: Xavier Amorós, J.C García González, C Sánchez Monserrat

23 May
12:30 CEST

Report

Unicaja	85–76	Power Electronics Valencia
Scoring by quarter: 23–17, 14–30, 25–14, 23–15
Pts: Freeland 16; Rebs: Freeland 7 Asts: Cook 7		Pts: Kelati 25; Rebs: Marinovic, Nielsen 5 Asts: Marinovic 4
Unicaja wins Series 2–0

Martin Carpena Arena
Attendance: 10000
Referees: Juan Carlos Arteaga, Redondo, J.J. Martínez Díez

=== Caja Laboral vs. Asefa Estudiantes ===
21 May
20:15 CEST

Report

Caja Laboral	92–76	Asefa Estudiantes
Scoring by quarter: 24–26, 27–17, 22–18, 19–15
Pts: Teletović 18; Rebs: Splitter 11; Asts: Huertas 10		Pts: Caner-Medley 18; Rebs: Jasen 12; Asts: Suárez 3

Fernando Buesa Arena
Attendance: 9200
Referees: E. Pérez Pizarro, Antonio Conde, Carlos Peruga

23 May
12:30 CEST

Report

Asefa Estudiantes	83–85	Caja Laboral
Scoring by quarter: 25–19, 21–25, 18–25, 19–16
Pts: Gabriel 20; Rebs: Caner-Medley 7 Asts: Oliver 8		Pts: San Emeterio 19; Rebs: Herrmann 7 Asts: Huertas 4
Laboral wins Series 2–0

Telefónica Arena
Attendance: 9500
Referees: Juan Carlos Mitjana, Vicente Bultó, Carlos Cortés

=== Real Madrid vs. Cajasol ===
20 May
20:30 CEST

Report

Real Madrid	60–66	Cajasol
Scoring by quarter: 9–13, 17–22, 18–17, 16–14
Pts: Bullock 13; Rebs: Reyes 11; Asts: Jarić 4		Pts: Savanović 19; Rebs: Duško Savanović 6 Asts: Radenović 3

Palacio Vistalegre
Attendance: 6200
Referees: Miguel Ángel Pérez Pérez, Óscar Perea, Anna Cardús

22 May
18:00 CEST

Report

Cajasol	71–76	Real Madrid
Scoring by quarter: 9–22, 16–18, 17–10, 29–26
Pts: Savanović 23; Rebs: Kirksay 10; Asts: Calloway 6		Pts: Bullock 17; Rebs: Tomic, Llull, Velickovic 5 Asts: Prigioni 4

Palacio Municipal San Pablo
Attendance: 6800
Referees: J.A. Martín Bertrán, Lluis Guirao, Francisco J. Araña

24 May
20:30 CEST

Report

Real Madrid	67–60	Cajasol
Scoring by quarter: 19–14, 22–15, 10–15, 16-16
Pts: Garbajosa 14; Rebs: Reyes, Garbajosa 5 Asts: Prigioni 5		Pts: Ellis 17; Rebs: Duško Savanović 5 Asts: Calloway 8
Madrid wins Series 2–1

Palacio Vistalegre
Attendance: 6300
Referees: Xavier Amorós, J.C García González, Vicente Bultó

== Semifinals ==
The Semifinals were best-of-5 series

=== Regal FC Barcelona vs. Unicaja ===
27 May
20:30 CEST

Report

Regal FC Barcelona	96–82	Unicaja
Scoring by quarter: 21–24, 23–24, 35–21, 17–13
Pts: Navarro 24; Rebs: Morris 9 Asts: Rubio 8		Pts: Neal 19; Rebs: Freeland 8 Asts: Welsch 5

Palau Blaugrana
Attendance: 5477
Referees: Juan Carlos Mitjana, Daniel Hierrezuelo, José Javier Murgui

29 May
20:00 CEST

Report

Regal FC Barcelona	71–58	Unicaja
Scoring by quarter: 12–13, 28–10, 16–23, 15–12
Pts: Navarro 16; Rebs: Morris 12; Asts: Navarro 5		Pts: Freeland 11; Rebs: Printezis 7 Asts: Dowdell 3

Palau Blaugrana
Attendance: 6510
Referees: Fco. De La Maza, M.A. Pérez Pérez, Redondo

1 June
20:30 CEST

Report

Unicaja	72–82	Regal FC Barcelona
Scoring by quarter: 21–20, 19–15, 19–22, 13–25
Pts: Neal 18; Rebs: Archibald 6 Asts: Cook 5		Pts: Basile 20; Rebs: Vázquez 10; Asts: Rubio, Mickeal each 2
Barcelona wins series 3–0

Jose Maria Martin Carpena Arena
Attendance: 10000
Referees: J.A. Martín Bertrán, Antonio Conde, Vicente Bultó

=== Caja Laboral vs. Real Madrid ===
28 May
20:15 CEST

Report

Caja Laboral	62–60	Real Madrid
Scoring by quarter: 16–16, 10–18, 23–13, 13–13
Pts: Splitter 14; Rebs: Splitter 9 Asts: Splitter, Huertas each 4		Pts: Reyes 15; Rebs: Reyes 7 Asts: Prigioni 5

Fernando Buesa Arena
Attendance: 9200
Referees: Juan Carlos Arteaga, J.R. García Ortiz, Oscar Perea

30 May
12:30 CEST

Report

Caja Laboral	85–80 (OT)	Real Madrid
Scoring by quarter: 22–16, 14–15, 15–24, 22–18, Overtime: 12–7
Pts: Splitter 23; Rebs: Splitter 10; Asts: Huertas 8		Pts: Reyes 16; Rebs: Reyes 13; Asts: Prigioni 8

Fernando Buesa Arena
Attendance: 8850
Referees: J.A. Martín Bertrán, E. Pérez Pizarro, Jiménez Trujillo

2 June
20:30 CEST

Report

Real Madrid	80–67	Caja Laboral
Scoring by quarter: 21–21, 16–17, 21–15, 22–14
Pts: Tomić 18; Rebs: Reyes 9 Asts: Veličković 5		Pts: Splitter 17; Rebs: Teletović 8 Asts: Huertas 5

Palacio Vistalegre
Attendance: 9300
Referees: Daniel Hierrezuelo, M.A. Pérez Pérez, Lluis Guirao

4 June
20:30 CEST

Report

Real Madrid	80–62	Caja Laboral
Scoring by quarter: 24–26, 23–13, 17–17, 16–6
Pts: Tomić 19; Rebs: Tomić 14; Asts: Prigioni 10		Pts: Splitter 20; Rebs: Splitter 8 Asts: Huertas 5

Palacio Vistalegre
Attendance: 10200
Referees: Fco. De La Maza, Redondo, Antonio Conde

6 June
12:30 CEST

Report

Caja Laboral	64–56	Real Madrid
Scoring by quarter: 18–12, 10–11, 18–20, 18–13
Pts: Splitter 18; Rebs: Splitter 9 Asts: Huertas 5		Pts: Reyes, Llull each 13; Rebs: Novica Veličković 8 Asts: Prigioni, Bullock, Llull each 2
Laboral wins series 3–2

Fernando Buesa Arena
Attendance: 9150
Referees: J.A. Martín Bertrán, J.R. García Ortiz, E. Pérez Pizarro

== ACB finals ==
The finals was a best-of-5 series.

=== Regal FC Barcelona vs. Caja Laboral ===
10 June
20:30 CEST

Report

Regal FC Barcelona	58–63	Caja Laboral
Scoring by quarter: 16–22, 16–12, 16–11, 10–18
Pts: Navarro 17; Rebs: Lorbek 8 Asts: Lorbek 4		Pts: Splitter 16; Rebs: San Emeterio 9 Asts: Huertas 3

Palau Blaugrana
Attendance: 7235
Referees: Juan Carlos Arteaga, J.R. García Ortiz, Redondo

12 June
18:00 CEST

Report

Regal FC Barcelona	69–70	Caja Laboral
Scoring by quarter: 19–17, 19–16, 15–14, 16–23
Pts: Mickeal 18; Rebs: Morris 8 Asts: Lorbek 3		Pts: San Emeterio 19; Rebs: Splitter 6 Asts: Huertas 3

Palau Blaugrana
Attendance: 7235
Referees: Fco. De La Maza, J.A. Martín Bertrán, Antonio Conde

15 June
20:30 CEST

Report

Caja Laboral	79–78 (OT)	Regal FC Barcelona
Scoring by quarter: 22–18, 19–18, 11–17, 14–13, Overtime: 13–12
Pts: Eliyahu 18; Rebs: Splitter 13; Asts: Splitter 4		Pts: Navarro 18; Rebs: Morris 9 Asts: Rubio 4
Laboral win series 3–0

Fernando Buesa Arena
Attendance: 9700
Referees: Daniel Hierrezuelo, E. Pérez Pizarro, Jiménez Trujillo

ACB Finals MVP: (Brazil) Tiago Splitter

2010 ACB League
Caja Laboral
