= 2009 Copa del Rey de Baloncesto =

Copa del Rey 2009
- League: Copa del Rey
- Sport: Basketball
- Finals champions: Baskonia
- Runners-up: Unicaja
- Finals MVP: (Bosnia and Herzegovina) Mirza Teletović

Copa del Rey seasons
- ← 2007–08 2009–10 →

The Copa del Rey 2008-09 was the 73rd edition of the Spanish basketball Cup. It was managed by the ACB and was disputed in Madrid, Community of Madrid in the Palacio de Deportes between days 19 and 22 of February. The winning team was TAU Cerámica.

== Bracket ==
Quarterfinals; February 19 & 20		Semifinals; February 21		Final; February 22
TAU Cerámica	82
Pamesa Valencia	66	TAU Cerámica	90
Real Madrid	75	Regal Barcelona	77
Regal Barcelona	83			TAU Cerámica	100
Unicaja	79			Unicaja	98
Kalise Gran Canaria	69	Unicaja	78
MMT Estudiantes	80	MMT Estudiantes	71
DKV Joventut	75

=== Quarterfinals ===
La 2 & Teledeporte (Spain)

February 19
19:00 GTM+1

Report

Real Madrid (Community of Madrid)	75–83	(Catalonia) Regal FC Barcelona
Scoring by quarter: 19–23, 19–21, 21–20, 16–19
Pts: Bullock 22; Rebs: Reyes, Hervelle 9 Asts: 4 players 3		Pts: Navarro 28; Rebs: Basile 6 Asts: Navarro 10

Palacio de Deportes, Madrid
Attendance: 11,000
Referees: Hierrezuelo, Pérez Pizarro, García González (Spain)

Teledeporte (Spain)

February 19
21:30 GTM+1

Report

TAU Cerámica (Basque Country (autonomous community))	82–66	(Valencian Community) Pamesa Valencia
Scoring by quarter: 16-22, 17-13, 21-15, 28-16
Pts: Splitter 20; Rebs: Splitter 10; Asts: Prigioni 6		Pts: Perović 13; Rebs: Perović, Nielsen 5 Asts: Oliver, Williams 4

Palacio de Deportes, Madrid
Attendance: 10,500
Referees: Mitjana, Arteaga, Murgui (Spain)

Teledeporte (Spain)

February 20
19:00 GTM+1

Report

Unicaja (Andalusia)	79–69	(Canary Islands) Kalise Gran Canaria
Scoring by quarter: 19-15, 15-21, 26-16, 19-17
Pts: Haislip 22; Rebs: N'Dong 9 Asts: 6 players 1		Pts: English 20; Rebs: Augustine 9 Asts: Norris 4

Palacio de Deportes, Madrid
Attendance: 10,200
Referees: Martín Bertrán, Pérez Pérez, Perea (Spain)

La 2 & Teledeporte (Spain)

February 20
21:30 GTM+1

Report

MMT Estudiantes (Community of Madrid)	80–75	(Catalonia) DKV Joventut
Scoring by quarter: 17-15, 17-19, 19-17, 27-24
Pts: Udrih 23; Rebs: Wideman 7 Asts: Brewer 3		Pts: Rubio 16; Rebs: Hernández-Sonseca 8 Asts: Rubio 7

Palacio de Deportes, Madrid
Attendance: 11,000
Referees: Fco. De La Maza, Redondo, Antonio Conde

=== Semifinals ===
La 2 & Teledeporte (Spain)

February 21
18:00 GTM+1

Report

Regal FC Barcelona (Catalonia)	77–90	(Basque Country (autonomous community)) TAU Cerámica
Scoring by quarter: 19-21, 15-22, 18-22, 25-25
Pts: Navarro 19; Rebs: Vázquez 7 Asts: Navarro 6		Pts: Rakočević 27; Rebs: Teletović 10; Asts: Prigioni, Vidal 4

Palacio de Deportes, Madrid
Attendance: 10,900
Referees: Juan Carlos Arteaga, Daniel Hierrezuelo, E. Pérez Pizarro

FORTA & Teledeporte (Spain)

February 21
20:30 GTM+1

Report

MMT Estudiantes (Community of Madrid)	71–78	(Andalusia) Unicaja
Scoring by quarter: 23-23, 20-18, 12-10, 16-27
Pts: Iturbe 18; Rebs: Suárez 7 Asts: Three players 3		Pts: Archibald 17; Rebs: Welsch 6 Asts: Rodríguez 6

Palacio de Deportes, Madrid
Attendance: 11,000
Referees: Fco. De La Maza, J.A. Martín Bertrán, M.A. Pérez Pérez

=== Final ===
La 2 & Teledeporte (Spain)

February 22
18:30 GTM+1

Report

TAU Cerámica (Basque Country (autonomous community))	100–98 (OT)	(Andalusia) Unicaja
Scoring by quarter: 18–17, 25–27, 17–13, 27–30, Overtime: 13–11
Pts: Mickeal, Teletović 20; Rebs: Mickeal 10; Asts: Rakočević 4		Pts: Haislip 23; Rebs: Archibald 13; Asts: Cook 4

Palacio de Deportes, Madrid
Attendance: 11,500
Referees: Arteaga, Martín Bertrán, Redondo

Copa del Rey 2009 Champions

TAU Cerámica
6th title

- MVP of the Tournament: Mirza Teletović

== Television broadcasting ==
- TVE2, FORTA and Teledeporte.

== Organizer ==
- ACB and the Ayuntamiento de Madrid.

== Sponsorships ==
- Mahou-San Miguel, Axa, Orange and Renfe.
