= Tiago Splitter =

Brazilian basketball player and coach (born 1985)

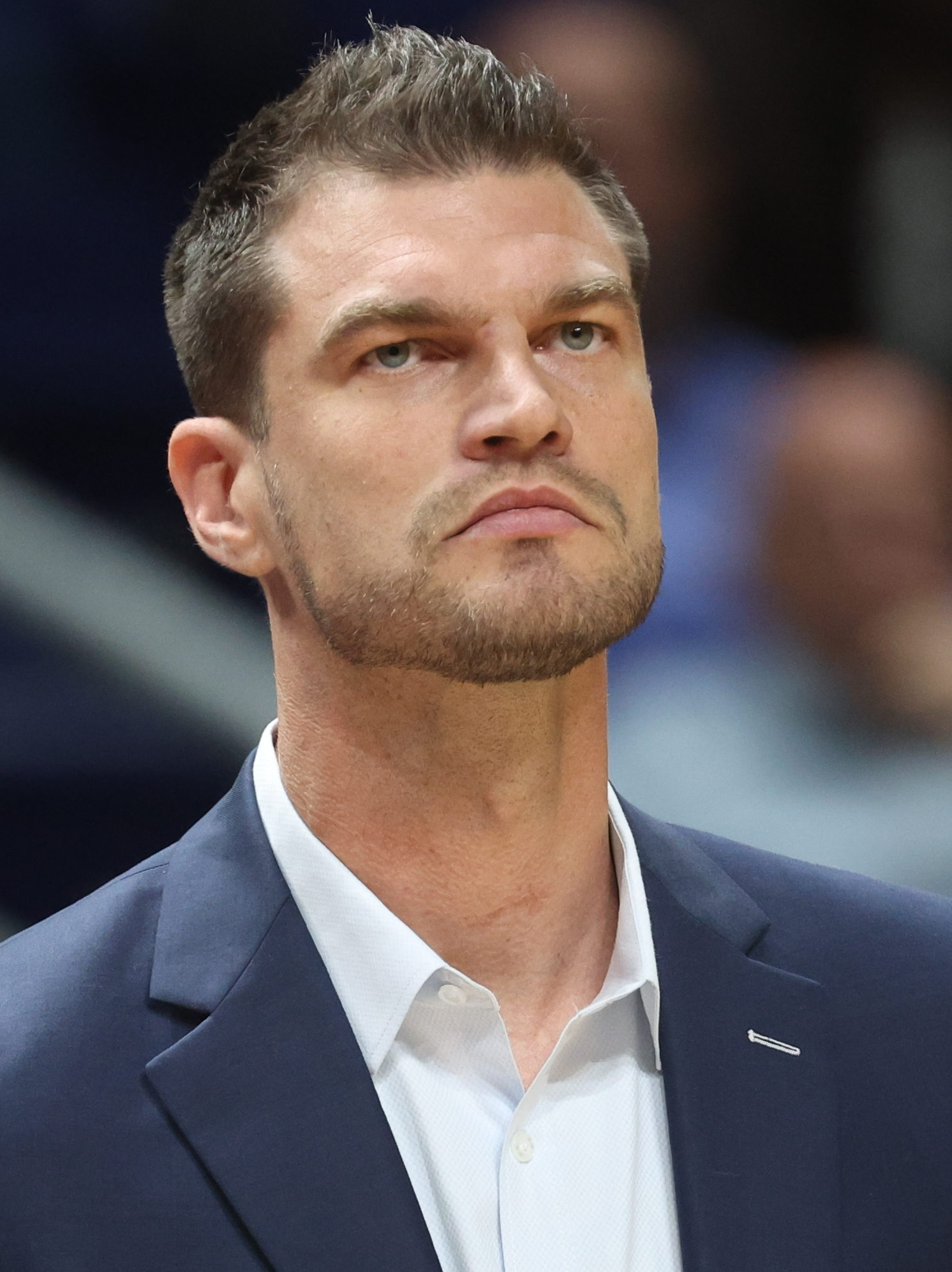
- Splitter in 2024

Chicago Bulls
- Title: Head coach
- League: NBA

Personal information
- Born: January 1, 1985 (age 41) Joinville, Santa Catarina, Brazil
- Listed height: 6 ft 11 in (2.11 m)
- Listed weight: 245 lb (111 kg)

Career information
- NBA draft: 2007: 1st round, 28th overall pick
- Drafted by: San Antonio Spurs
- Playing career: 1999–2017
- Position: Center / power forward
- Number: 22, 11, 47
- Coaching career: 2019–present

Career history

Playing
- 1999–2000: Ipiranga
- 2000–2010: Saski Baskonia
- 2000–2001: →Araba Gorago Alava
- 2001–2003: →Bilbao Basket
- 2010–2015: San Antonio Spurs
- 2011: Valencia
- 2015–2017: Atlanta Hawks
- 2017: Philadelphia 76ers
- 2017: →Delaware 87ers

Coaching
- 2019–2023: Brooklyn Nets (assistant)
- 2023–2024: Houston Rockets (assistant)
- 2024–2025: Paris Basketball
- 2025: Portland Trail Blazers (assistant)
- 2025–2026: Portland Trail Blazers (interim HC)
- 2026–present: Chicago Bulls

Career highlights
- As player: NBA champion (2014); All-EuroLeague First Team (2008); 2× All-EuroLeague Second Team (2009, 2010); 2× Liga ACB champion (2008, 2010); 3× Spanish Cup winner (2004, 2006, 2009); 4× Spanish Super Cup winner (2005–2008); Liga ACB MVP (2010); Liga ACB Finals MVP (2010); All-Liga ACB Team (2010); 2× Spanish Super Cup MVP (2006, 2007); Spanish Third Division champion (2002); No. 21 retired by Saski Baskonia; As coach: LNB Élite champion (2025); French Cup winner (2025)

Career NBA statistics
- Points: 2,816 (7.9 ppg)
- Rebounds: 1,779 (5.0 rpg)
- Assists: 423 (1.2 apg)
- Stats at NBA.com
- Stats at Basketball Reference
Medals
Men's basketball
Representing Brazil
FIBA AmeriCup
Gold medal – first place	2005 Santo Domingo
Gold medal – first place	2009 San Juan
Silver medal – second place	2011 Mar del Plata
Pan American Games
Gold medal – first place	2003 Santo Domingo
FIBA South American Championship
Gold medal – first place	2003 Montevideo

Tiago Splitter Beims (Brazilian Portuguese pronunciation: [tʃiˈagu (i)ˈspliteʁ ˈbẽjs]; born January 1, 1985) is a Brazilian professional basketball coach and former player who is the head coach for the Chicago Bulls of the National Basketball Association (NBA). A three-time All-EuroLeague Team selection prior to his NBA career, he became the first Brazilian-born player to win an NBA championship, in 2014, as a member of the San Antonio Spurs.

== Early life ==
Splitter was born in Joinville, Santa Catarina, Brazil.

== Professional career ==
=== Brazil and Spain (1999–2010) ===
Splitter began his professional career in 1999. In 2000, he began to play in Spain's top-level league, the Liga ACB. In 2004, Splitter became a naturalised citizen of Spain. Splitter was named the MVP of the Spanish Supercup tournament in both 2006 and 2007. He was also named to the All-EuroLeague First Team for the EuroLeague's 2007–08 season, after helping Saski Baskonia make it to the 2008 EuroLeague Final Four. The following year, Splitter reached the EuroLeague 2008–09 season's playoffs, but failed to make another EuroLeague Final Four participation. Nevertheless, his performances earned him a spot on the 2008–09 All-EuroLeague Second Team. Splitter was named the Spanish League MVP in 2010.

Splitter was expected to declare for the 2006 NBA draft, but because the expensive buyout of his contract discouraged NBA teams with high draft picks from drafting him, he remained in the Spanish ACB League for that season. Splitter was automatically eligible for the 2007 NBA draft, as he was at least 22 years of age at the time of the draft. He was selected by the San Antonio Spurs, in the first round of the draft, with the 28th overall draft pick.

On May 28, 2008, ESPN Brasil reported that Splitter had re-signed with Saski Baskonia, on a two-year contract that would keep him in the Spanish ACB League through the 2009–10 NBA season. The contract allowed the Brazilian to make eight times more than the NBA rookie scale salary cap would have allowed him to make with the San Antonio Spurs at that time. On June 7, 2008, the San Antonio Express-News reported that Spurs General Manager R.C. Buford, had stated that Splitter had informed the team that he would not be coming to San Antonio for the 2008–09 NBA season.

Splitter had instead signed an extension with Saski Baskonia, that would keep him in the Spanish ACB League through 2010. It was announced on July 9, 2010, that Splitter had opted out of his contract with Saski Baskonia, in order to sign in the NBA with the San Antonio Spurs.

=== San Antonio Spurs (2010–2015) ===
On July 12, 2010, Splitter signed a contract with the San Antonio Spurs. The deal was believed to be worth $11 million over three years.

He earned his first start of his NBA career on March 19, against the Charlotte Bobcats, in place of the injured Tim Duncan. In this game, Splitter recorded eight points and six rebounds.

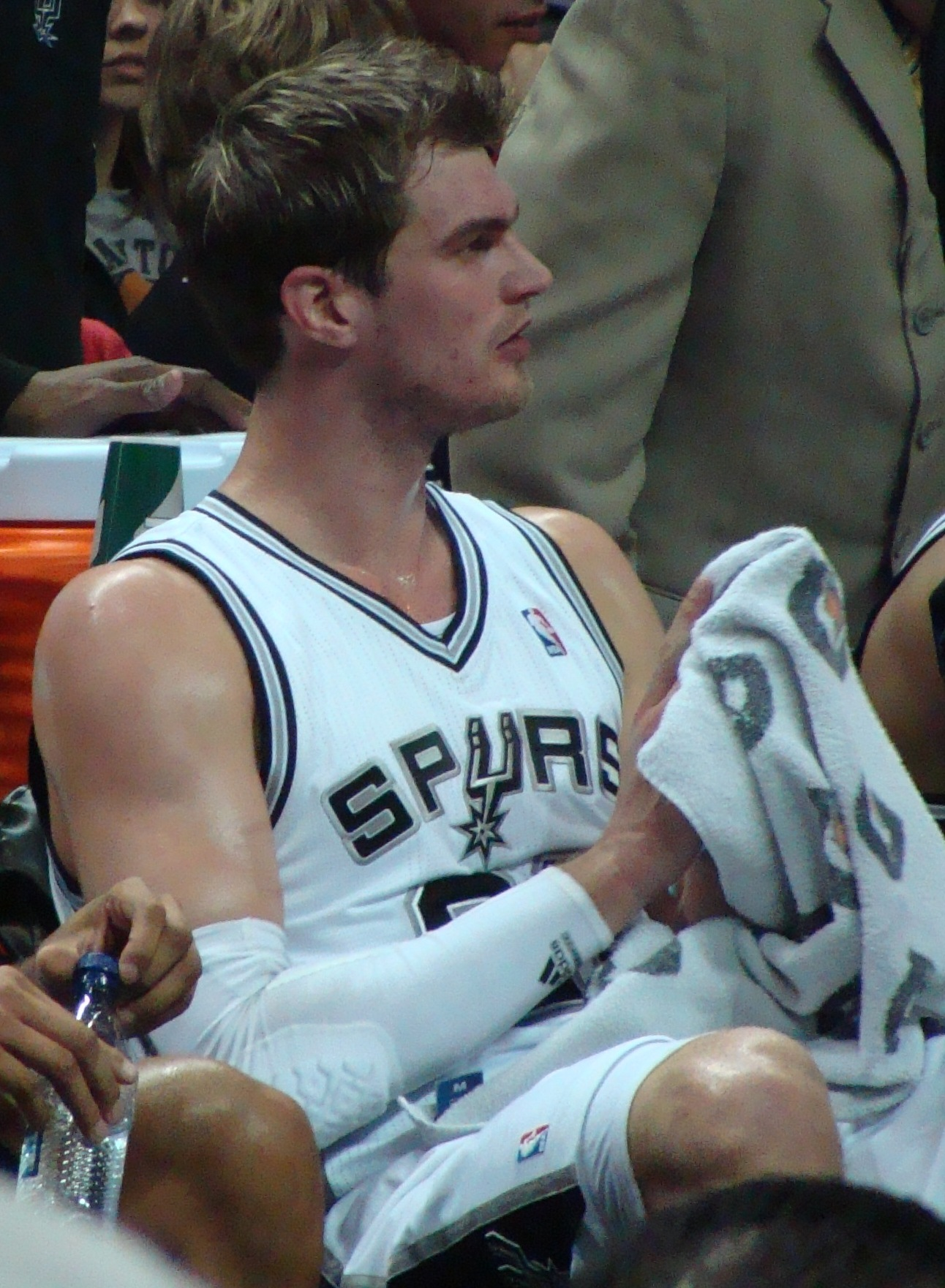
Splitter on the bench in 2012

On February 8, 2012, Splitter and teammate Kawhi Leonard, were selected to play in the 2012 Rising Stars Challenge. On February 17, it was revealed that both Splitter and Leonard would be teammates for Team Chuck. However, due to an injury, he was released from Team Chuck and was replaced by Derrick Favors.

On May 29, 2012, in Game 2 of the Western Conference Finals, Oklahoma City Thunder head coach Scott Brooks attempted to slow San Antonio's offense through continually fouling Splitter, sending him to the free throw line with the "Hack-a-Shaq" strategy.

He played his most productive season with the Spurs in 2012–13, averaging 10.3 points and 6.4 rebounds per game, while playing all but the final game of the regular season. He started 58 games, as the Spurs finished the West as the two-seed, behind the Oklahoma City Thunder. The Spurs would advance to the 2013 NBA Finals, only to lose to the Miami Heat in seven games, as Miami won their second straight NBA championship.

On July 13, 2013, he re-signed with the Spurs. On June 15, 2014, Splitter won his first NBA championship, after the Spurs defeated the Miami Heat, 4 games to 1 in the 2014 NBA Finals.

After missing 20 out of the first 21 games of the 2014–15 season with a back injury, Splitter played out the rest of the season, until missing the final six games of the regular season, with a calf injury. He returned for the playoffs, but the Spurs were knocked out in the first round by the Los Angeles Clippers, in seven games.

=== Atlanta Hawks (2015–2017) ===
On July 9, 2015, Splitter was traded to the Atlanta Hawks, in exchange for the draft rights to Georgios Printezis, and a future second-round pick. On February 16, 2016, he was ruled out for the rest of the season, after electing to have surgery to repair his right hip.

On October 11, 2016, Splitter was ruled out for four weeks with a grade 2 hamstring strain. He was ruled out for a further six weeks, on November 26, after an MRI exam revealed a grade 2 right calf strain.

=== Philadelphia 76ers (2017) ===
On February 22, 2017, Splitter was traded, along with a second-round draft pick, to the Philadelphia 76ers, in exchange for Ersan İlyasova. On March 21, 2017, he was assigned to the Delaware 87ers, the 76ers' D-League affiliate. He was recalled six days later. On March 28, 2017, he made his debut for the 76ers, recording two points and three rebounds, in seven minutes of playing time, in a 106–101 win over the Brooklyn Nets. Splitter, who had been nursing a right calf injury, entered the game late in the first quarter, and played in his first game since January 31, 2016, when he was a member of the Atlanta Hawks, before undergoing hip surgery. He played a handful of games with a prosthetic hip.

=== Retirement ===
On February 19, 2018, Splitter announced his retirement from playing professional basketball, due to a hip injury that had hindered the back-end of his career.

On May 5, 2024, Splitter's jersey number 21 was retired by Saski Baskonia.

== National team career ==
As a member of the Brazil men's national basketball team, Splitter won gold medals at the 2003 FIBA South American Championship, the 2003 Pan American Games, the 2005 FIBA AmeriCup, and the 2009 FIBA AmeriCup. He won a silver medal with Brazil at the 2011 FIBA AmeriCup.

Splitter also played for Brazil in the 2002 FIBA World Cup, the 2006 FIBA World Cup, the 2010 FIBA World Cup, the 2012 Summer Olympics, and the 2014 FIBA World Cup.

== Coaching career ==
=== NBA ===
On April 24, 2018, Splitter was hired by the Brooklyn Nets, as a pro scout, with added duties related to on-court player development. On September 23, 2019, he was promoted by the Nets to player development coach. Splitter parted ways with the Nets on May 1, 2023.

On July 3, 2023, Splitter was hired by the Houston Rockets as an assistant coach under new head coach Ime Udoka.

On June 12, 2025, Splitter was named an assistant coach for the Portland Trail Blazers under head coach Chauncey Billups. On October 23, after Billups was arrested in connection with a federal gambling investigation and placed on leave by the NBA following their regular season debut loss to the Minnesota Timberwolves from the previous day, Splitter was named the team's interim head coach. Splitter led Portland to a 42–40 record after he was involved with the regular season debut loss to the Timberwolves as an assistant coach earlier in the season and the franchise's first playoff appearance since 2021. The Trail Blazers clinched the seventh seed with a 114–110 win over the Phoenix Suns in the play-in tournament, before losing to the San Antonio Spurs in five games in the first round of the playoffs.

On June 16, 2026, Splitter was hired by the Chicago Bulls to serve as the team's head coach.

=== Europe ===
On July 16, 2024, Splitter was named the head coach for Paris Basketball in the LNB Élite and the EuroLeague. They ended up winning the French championship and the French Cup in 2025, and qualified for the play-offs through play-in in EuroLeague. He left the team after one season.

=== National team ===
In 2021, Splitter was named an assistant coach of the Brazilian national team.

In 2022, Splitter was named head coach of the Brazilian U23 national team at the GLOBL Jam Tournament in Toronto, Canada, where the team won the gold medal.

== Career statistics ==
Legend
GP	Games played	GS	Games started	MPG	Minutes per game
FG%	Field goal percentage	3P%	3-point field goal percentage	FT%	Free throw percentage
RPG	Rebounds per game	APG	Assists per game	SPG	Steals per game
BPG	Blocks per game	PPG	Points per game	**Bold**	Career high
†	Won an NBA championship

=== NBA ===
==== Regular season ====
Year	Team	GP	GS	MPG	FG%	3P%	FT%	RPG	APG	SPG	BPG	PPG
2010–11	San Antonio	60	6	12.3	.529	.000	.543	3.4	.4	.5	.3	4.6
2011–12	San Antonio	59	2	19.0	**.618**	.000	.691	5.2	1.1	.4	**.8**	9.3
2012–13	San Antonio	**81**	**58**	**24.7**	.560	.000	.730	**6.4**	**1.6**	**.8**	**.8**	**10.3**
2013–14†	San Antonio	59	50	21.5	.523	.000	.699	6.2	1.5	.5	.5	8.2
2014–15	San Antonio	52	35	19.8	.558	.000	.750	4.8	1.5	.7	.7	8.2
2015–16	Atlanta	36	2	16.1	.523	.000	.813	3.3	.8	.6	.3	5.6
2016–17	Philadelphia	8	0	9.5	.452	**.333**	**.818**	2.8	.5	.1	.1	4.9
Career		355	153	19.2	.555	.143	.697	5.0	1.2	.6	.6	7.9

==== Playoffs ====
Year	Team	GP	GS	MPG	FG%	3P%	FT%	RPG	APG	SPG	BPG	PPG
2011	San Antonio	3	0	16.7	.625	.000	.000	4.7	.3	**1.0**	.3	6.7
2012	San Antonio	13	0	12.9	**.638**	.000	.372	2.8	.8	.4	.3	5.8
2013	San Antonio	19	15	20.4	.536	.000	**.788**	3.1	1.2	.8	**.7**	6.1
2014†	San Antonio	**23**	**18**	**22.4**	.610	.000	.718	**6.1**	**2.0**	.7	.5	**7.5**
2015	San Antonio	7	7	17.6	.375	.000	.316	4.4	1.3	.6	.1	3.4
Career		65	40	19.1	.572	.000	.586	4.3	1.4	.7	.5	6.3

=== EuroLeague ===
Legend
GP	Games played	GS	Games started	MPG	Minutes per game
FG%	Field-goal percentage	3P%	3-point field-goal percentage	FT%	Free-throw percentage
RPG	Rebounds per game	APG	Assists per game	SPG	Steals per game
BPG	Blocks per game	PPG	Points per game	PIR	Performance index rating
**Bold**	Career high	*	Led the league

Year	Team	GP	GS	MPG	FG%	3P%	FT%	RPG	APG	SPG	BPG	PPG	PIR
2003–04	Baskonia	16	1	11.2	.619	—	.632	2.4	.3	.4	.3	4.0	3.9
2004–05	Baskonia	19	2	17.8	.533	—	.487	4.5	.9	.7	.7	7.0	7.6
2005–06	Baskonia	24	11	21.6	.599	—	.547	4.6	.6	1.3	.5	9.5	10.8
2006–07	Baskonia	20	12	24.7	.580	—	.529	**6.0**	.8	**1.4**	.3	10.7	13.2
2007–08	Baskonia	**25***	13	22.5	.618	.000	**.645**	5.0	1.1	1.0	.8	**14.0**	16.1
2008–09	Baskonia	17	12	24.7	**.655**	.000	.602	5.4	1.6	.6	**1.6**	**14.0**	**17.8**
2009–10	Baskonia	16	**14**	**26.7**	.535	.000	.636	5.4	**1.8**	.8	.5	13.0	15.8
Career		137	65	21.5	.593	.000	.582	4.8	1.0	.9	.7	10.5	12.3

== Head coaching record ==
Legend
Regular season	G	Games coached	W	Games won	L	Games lost	W–L %	Win–loss %
Playoffs	PG	Playoff games	PW	Playoff wins	PL	Playoff losses	PW–L %	Playoff win–loss %

Team	Year	G	W	L	W–L%	Finish	PG	PW	PL	PW–L%	Result
Portland	2025–26	81	42	39	.519	4th in Northwest	5	1	4	.200	Lost in first round
Career		81	42	39	.519		5	1	4	.200	

== Personal life ==
Splitter is the son of Cássio Beims and Elisabeth Splitter. He is of German descent by maternal and paternal sides and was raised a Christian, although his father is partially of Ashkenazi Jewish descent. In 2009, Splitter's sister Michelle, also a basketball player, died of leukemia at the age of 19. Splitter married his first wife, Amaia Amescua, in 2010. They have two children and divorced in 2016. In 2017, Splitter married his second wife, Fernanda.

== See also ==
- List of select Jewish basketball players
