= Mirza Teletović =

Bosnian basketball player (born 1985)

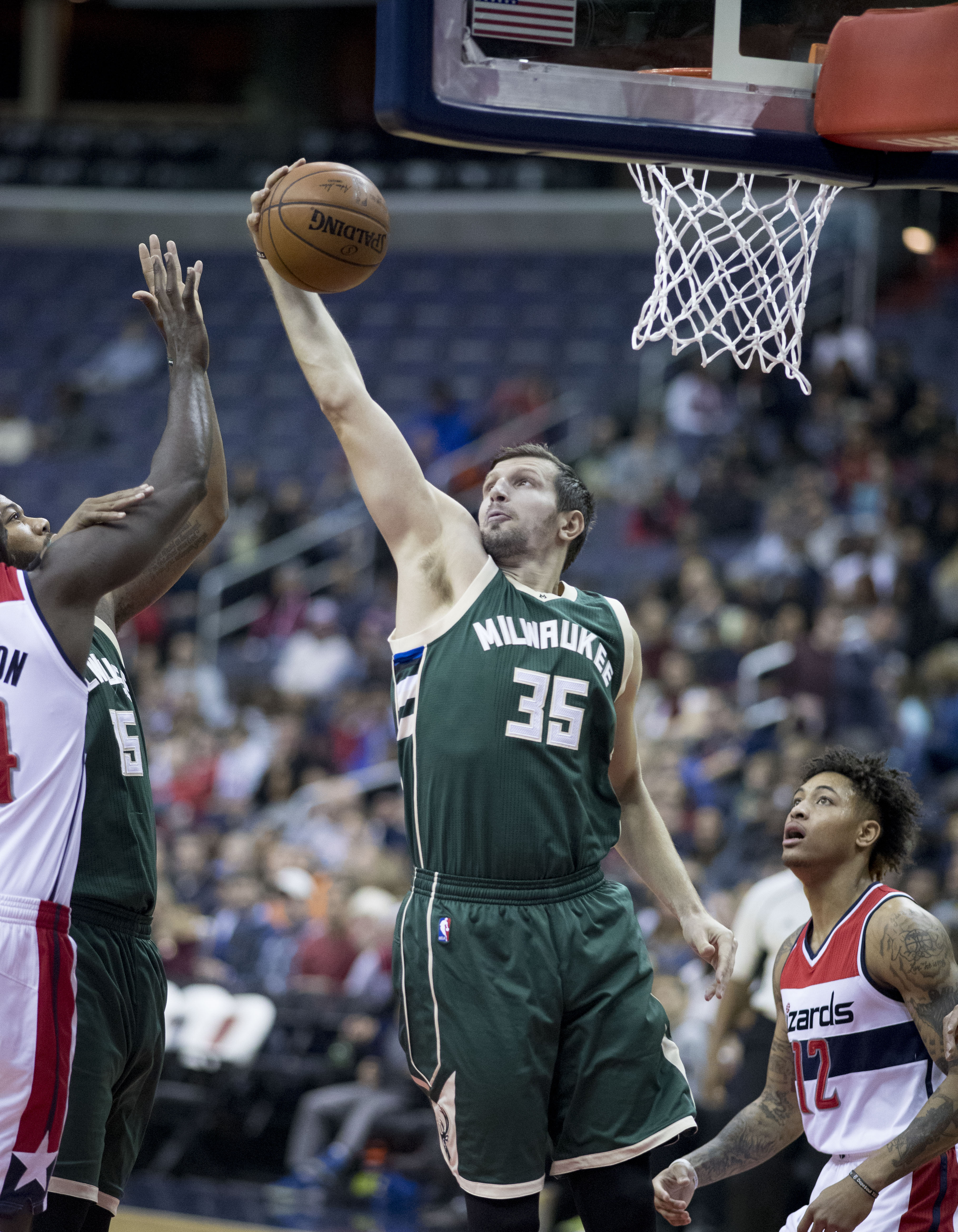
- Teletović with the Milwaukee Bucks in 2016

President of the Basketball Federation of Bosnia and Herzegovina
- In office October 20, 2018 – June 8, 2022
- Preceded by: Sejo Bukva
- Succeeded by: Boris Spasojević

Personal details
- Born: September 18, 1985 (age 41) Jablanica, SR Bosnia and Herzegovina, Yugoslavia
- Basketball career

Personal information
- Listed height: 6 ft 9 in (2.06 m)
- Listed weight: 242 lb (110 kg)

Career information
- NBA draft: 2007: undrafted
- Playing career: 2002–2021
- Position: Power forward
- Number: 12, 33, 35

Career history
- 2002–2004: Sloboda Tuzla
- 2004–2006: Telindus Oostende
- 2006–2012: Saski Baskonia
- 2012–2015: Brooklyn Nets
- 2015–2016: Phoenix Suns
- 2016–2018: Milwaukee Bucks
- 2021: KK Turbina

Career highlights
- Belgian League champion (2006); 2× Liga ACB champion (2008, 2010); Spanish Cup winner (2009); 3× Spanish Supercup winner (2006–2008); Liga ACB Rising Star (2008); All-Liga ACB First Team (2012); Spanish Cup MVP (2009); Bosnian Sportsman of the Year (2012)
- Stats at NBA.com
- Stats at Basketball Reference

Mirza Teletović (born September 18, 1985) is a Bosnian former professional basketball player who was the president of the Basketball Federation of Bosnia and Herzegovina from 2018 to 2022. As a player, he spent six seasons in the National Basketball Association (NBA). He also represented and captained the Bosnia and Herzegovina national basketball team. Standing at 6 ft 9 in (2.06 m), he played at the power forward position.

Teletović started his career in Bosnia with Sloboda Tuzla, which was followed by a stint in Belgium with Oostende. He played six years for Saski Baskonia, with whom he won two Liga ACB championships. He was also named to the All-ACB Team in 2012. Then, he played five seasons in the NBA for the Brooklyn Nets, Phoenix Suns and Milwaukee Bucks. On September 27, 2018, Teletović announced his retirement after suffering a career-ending pulmonary embolism injury during his tenure with the Bucks and then got waived in March 2018, removing his final year of his contract in December of that same year.

== Early life ==
Teletović lived in Bosnia and Herzegovina during the Bosnian War of the 1990s. His parents are from Jablanica in the Herzegovina region. He grew up in Mostar, a city which suffered an 18-month siege when he was a child during the Bosnian War. When Teletović shared his account of the war, he said:

I was seven years old when the war started. First you start seeing that there's no food, then grenades come down, the whole city is shaking, and you hear people screaming. Every day, your parents come in and say 'our neighbor died, our cousin died'. Always somebody dying. One day, I asked my mother, 'Is anybody alive?' It was very, very rough for us. It left, I will say, a memory...All my friends and me are playing [basketball] and then you hear the sirens like the grenades start falling down and just run to your house and hide. If I have to die, I die. For basketball, I will do anything.

As a youth, Teletović spent some of his time playing soccer, as well as learning kickboxing and karate. However, he felt most comfortable with playing basketball, as he played the sport at a local basketball court not far from his home.

== Professional career ==
=== Europe ===
==== Sloboda Tuzla (2002–2004) ====
Teletović made his professional debut with the club Sloboda Tuzla, of the Basketball Championship of Bosnia and Herzegovina, during the 2002–03 season. In his first season with the club, he averaged 7.2 points and 2.7 rebounds per game, while in his second season, he increased his stats to 26.4 points and 6.6 rebounds per game over 17 games in the league.

==== Telindus Oostende (2004–2006) ====
In 2004, Teletović moved to the Belgian Basketball League club Telindus Oostende and stayed for two seasons. He also played in Europe's second-tier level, continental-wide ULEB Cup competition, averaging 6.7 points and 2 rebounds.

==== Saski Baskonia (2006–2012) ====
He joined the EuroLeague club Saski Baskonia (known as Tau Cerámica at the time), of the Spanish ACB League, in 2006. He played his first game in the Spanish League on October 1, 2006, in a game against Pamesa, where they won on the road by 95–94. In his first season in EuroLeague, Europe's first-tier level, continental-wide competition, he averaged 5.3 points and 2.8 rebounds per game. He declared eligible for the 2007 NBA draft, but went undrafted.

In the next three seasons with the Spanish club, he became a starting player, and eventually became the captain of Baskonia, and one of the cornerstones of the team. In 2008, he won the Spanish League Rising Star Award. A year later, in 2009, when the club became known as Caja Laboral, he was named the MVP of the mid-season three game Spanish King's Cup tournament.

Over 10 games in the 2011–12 Euroleague season, he averaged a career-high 21.7 points and 6 rebounds per game. However, Caja Laboral did not reach the Top 16 round. In June 2012, Teletović reached a contract buyout agreement with Baskonia, for an amount of €2 million, in order to play the next year in the NBA.

=== NBA ===
==== Brooklyn Nets (2012–2015) ====
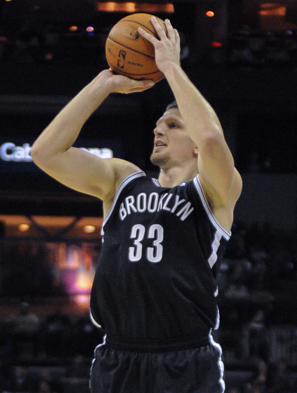
Teletović with the Nets in March 2013

On July 16, 2012, Teletović signed a three-year deal with the Brooklyn Nets. He made his NBA debut on November 5, 2012, in a game against the Minnesota Timberwolves. On March 1, 2013, Nets head coach P. J. Carlesimo said that he intended to put Teletović in the Nets rotation, along with giving him consistent minutes. He went on to tie his season-high of 14 points against the Washington Wizards in the team's second last game of the season on April 15. He managed just one playoff appearance for the Nets in their 4–3 first round series loss to the Chicago Bulls.

On November 29, 2013, Teletović recorded his first career double-double with 18 points and 13 rebounds against the Houston Rockets. On January 24, 2014, he scored a career-high 34 points in a 107–106 win over the Dallas Mavericks. On February 2, 2014, he recorded his second double-double of the season with 13 points and 11 rebounds against the New Orleans Pelicans.

On December 3, 2014, Teletović scored a season-high 26 points and grabbed a career-high 15 rebounds in a 95–93 overtime win over the San Antonio Spurs. On January 23, 2015, he was ruled out for the rest of the 2014–15 season after he was diagnosed with bilateral pulmonary embolus. He made an earlier than expected return for the Nets on April 22, playing four minutes and grabbing two rebounds in Game 2 of the team's first-round series loss to the Atlanta Hawks.

On June 18, 2015, the Nets tendered a qualifying offer worth $4.21 million to make Teletović a restricted free agent. However, on July 9, the Nets withdrew their qualifying offer and parted ways with him.

==== Phoenix Suns (2015–2016) ====
On July 17, 2015, Teletović signed a one-year, $5.5 million contract with the Phoenix Suns. He made his debut for the Suns in the team's season opener against the Dallas Mavericks on October 28, recording 5 points and 5 rebounds in a 111–95 loss. On November 29, he scored a season-high 20 points off the bench in a 107–102 win over the Toronto Raptors. He tied his season-high on December 7, scoring 20 points, including a go-ahead basket with 0.3 seconds left, to cap the Suns' furious fourth-quarter rally from 16 down in a 103–101 win over the Chicago Bulls. On December 16, he surpassed that mark, scoring a team-high 24 points in a loss to the Golden State Warriors. On January 12, 2016, he reached double figures for a career-best sixth straight game, scoring 19 points in a loss to the Indiana Pacers. On February 19, he scored a season-high 25 points in a loss to the Houston Rockets. Six days later, he topped that mark with 30 points in a loss to his former team, the Brooklyn Nets. On March 23, in a win over the Los Angeles Lakers, Teletović set the Suns' single-season record for most three-pointers made off the bench, surpassing Danny Ainge's 150 made three-pointers during the 1992–93 season. On April 5, in a loss to the Atlanta Hawks, Teletović set an NBA single-season record for most three-pointers made off the bench, surpassing Chuck Person's 164 made three-pointers during the 1994–95 season with the San Antonio Spurs. His record was broken the following season by Eric Gordon. Teletović finished the season with a 181 three-pointers, with 179 made while coming off the bench.

==== Milwaukee Bucks (2016–2018) ====
On July 8, 2016, Teletović signed a three-year, $30 million contract with the Milwaukee Bucks. On November 5, 2016, he scored 22 points and matched his career high with seven three-pointers in a 117–91 win over the Sacramento Kings. Teletović saw an expanded role in the wake of Michael Beasley sustaining a knee injury in late February 2017. However, Teletović sustained a slight hamstring injury in March 2017, but returned quickly and saw expanded minutes.

Teletović appeared in the first 10 games of the 2017–18 season for the Bucks before being ruled out for four weeks on November 21 after undergoing arthroscopic surgery to repair cartilage in his left knee. On December 14, 2017, he was sidelined further as a result of pulmonary emboli in both lungs. Teletović's condition was discovered when consulting with Bucks team physicians after he experienced unusual fatigue earlier in the week. On March 10, 2018, he was waived by the Bucks. On December 21, 2018, the Bucks' request to remove Teletovic's salary from their books for a career-ending injury was granted by the NBA.

=== Retirement ===
On September 27, 2018, Teletović announced his retirement, and revealed that he would start working at the Basketball Federation of Bosnia and Herzegovina. However, he came out of retirement in 2021 to join local team KK Turbina.

== National team career ==
Teletović played for the national basketball team of Bosnia and Herzegovina. He has played at the EuroBasket 2003, EuroBasket 2005, EuroBasket 2011, and EuroBasket 2013. In the EuroBasket 2011 tournament, he averaged 13.8 points and 5.8 rebounds per game; however, Bosnia and Herzegovina finished in 17th place out of 24 teams in the tournament.

In the EuroBasket 2013 qualification, Teletović averaged 24.3 points, 6.3 rebounds, and 2.1 assists per game and helped Bosnia and Herzegovina finished first in group D. During the final tournament, Teletović averaged 21.0 points, 7.6 rebounds, and 0.8 assists per game, with both points and rebounds per game being career highs for Teletović at the EuroBasket. Bosnia and Herzegovina was not able to advance to the second round despite its 3–2 record, leading to a 13th-placed finish. In the EuroBasket 2017 qualification, he averaged 17.5 points, 4.0 rebounds, and 1.5 assists per game.

== Career statistics ==
Legend
GP	Games played	GS	Games started	MPG	Minutes per game
FG%	Field-goal percentage	3P%	3-point field-goal percentage	FT%	Free-throw percentage
RPG	Rebounds per game	APG	Assists per game	SPG	Steals per game
BPG	Blocks per game	PPG	Points per game	PIR	Performance index rating
**Bold**	Career high

=== NBA ===
==== Regular season ====
Year	Team	GP	GS	MPG	FG%	3P%	FT%	RPG	APG	SPG	BPG	PPG
2012–13	Brooklyn	53	0	9.4	.384	.343	**.818**	1.8	.4	.2	.2	3.5
2013–14	Brooklyn	72	**7**	19.4	.418	.390	.710	3.7	.8	**.4**	.3	8.6
2014–15	Brooklyn	40	4	**22.3**	.382	.321	.717	**4.9**	**1.2**	**.4**	**.4**	8.5
2015–16	Phoenix	**79**	1	21.3	.427	.393	.774	3.8	1.1	**.4**	.3	**12.2**
2016–17	Milwaukee	70	2	16.2	.373	.341	.778	2.3	.7	.2	.2	6.4
2017–18	Milwaukee	10	0	15.9	**.439**	**.467**	–	2.3	1.0	**.4**	.1	7.1
Career		324	14	17.8	.406	.371	.755	3.2	.8	.3	.3	8.1

==== Playoffs ====
Year	Team	GP	GS	MPG	FG%	3P%	FT%	RPG	APG	SPG	BPG	PPG
2013	Brooklyn	1	0	1.0	–	–	–	.0	.0	.0	.0	.0
2014	Brooklyn	**12**	0	**18.3**	**.439**	**.339**	**.667**	**3.3**	**.3**	**.4**	**.2**	**8.3**
2015	Brooklyn	3	0	5.3	.000	.000	–	1.3	.0	.3	.0	.0
2017	Milwaukee	3	0	9.0	.167	.250	–	1.0	.0	.3	.0	1.0
Career		19	0	13.9	.398	.313	.667	2.5	.2	.4	.1	5.4

=== EuroLeague ===
*	Led the league

Year	Team	GP	GS	MPG	FG%	3P%	FT%	RPG	APG	SPG	BPG	PPG	PIR
2006–07	Baskonia	24	6	15.1	.374	.328	**.792**	2.8	.6	.5	.3	5.3	5.0
2007–08	Baskonia	**25***	**24**	27.2	.485	.433	.692	4.4	.4	.5	.5	10.5	9.2
2008–09	Baskonia	21	6	26.3	**.535**	.421	.750	3.7	.6	.4	.3	13.0	11.0
2009–10	Baskonia	20	18	30.1	.450	**.436**	.737	4.5	1.1	.5	.2	14.8	13.3
2010–11	Baskonia	20	17	34.1	.412	.360	.679	5.5	.8	**.6**	.5	15.4	13.1
2011–12	Baskonia	10	10	**34.4**	.437	.431	.700	**6.0**	**1.2**	.5	**1.0**	**21.7**	**20.7**
Career		120	81	26.8	.451	.405	.718	4.3	.7	.6	.5	12.4	11.0

== Personal life ==
Teletović is an ethnic Bosniak. He is a practicing Muslim. He has four children with his wife Maja.

His son, Benjamin Teletović, is a promising young basketball player, playing at shooting guard position.

== Awards and accomplishments ==
=== Club honours ===
- Basketball League Belgium Champion: (2006)
- 3× Spanish Supercup Winner: (2006, 2007, 2008)
- 2× Spanish ACB League Champion: (2008, 2010)
- 2× EuroLeague Final Four Participation: (2007, 2008)
- Spanish King's Cup Winner: (2009)

=== Individual ===
- ACB Rising Star Award: (2008)
- Spanish King's Cup MVP: (2009)
- All-ACB Team: (2012)
- Bosnian Sportsman of the Year: (2012)

=== NBA record ===
- Most three-pointers made while coming off the bench in a single season (179): (2016)
  - Was broken by Eric Gordon the following season

== See also ==
- List of European basketball players in the United States
