= Corey Fisher =

American-Georgian basketball player

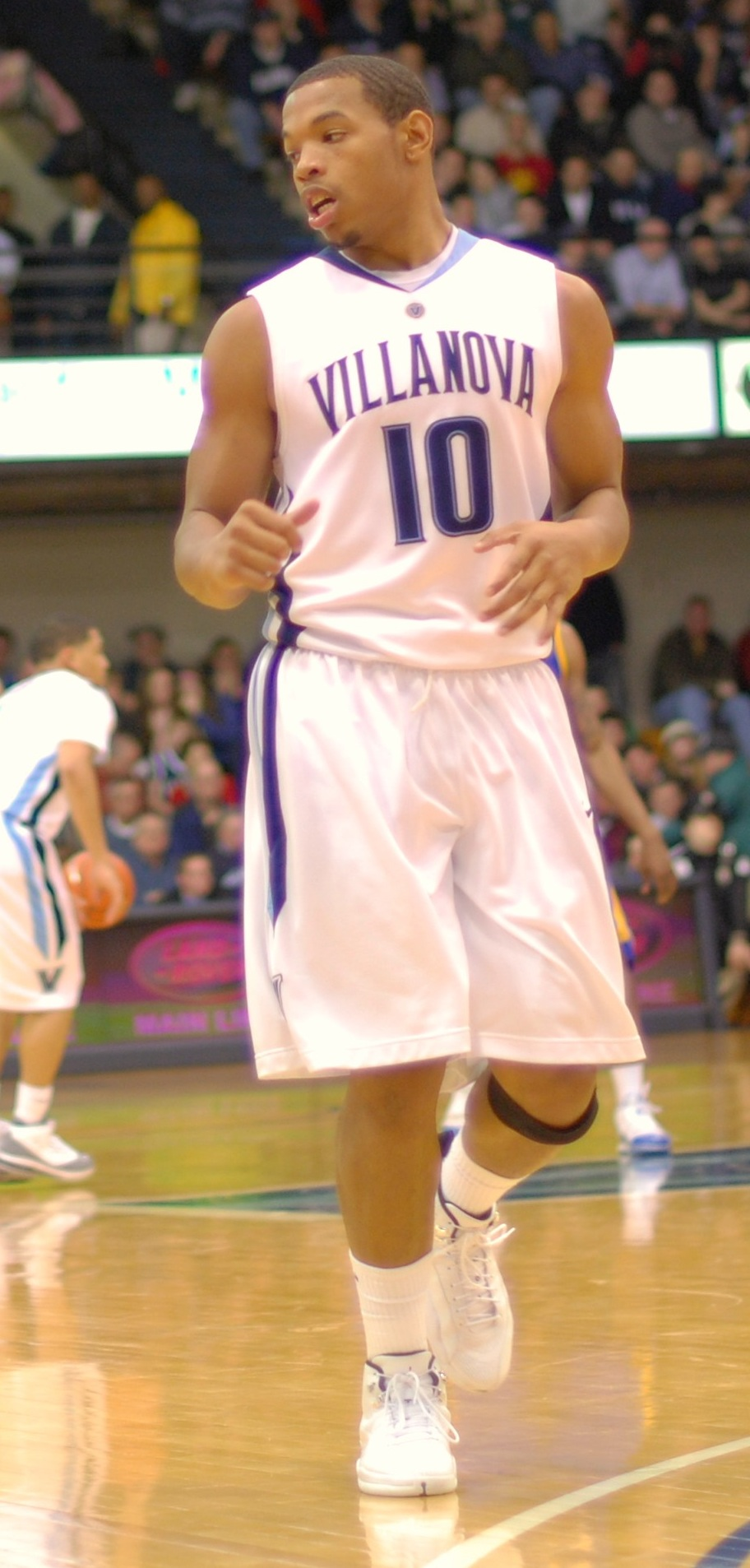
- Fisher with the Villanova Wildcats in 2009

Personal information
- Born: April 8, 1988 (age 38) The Bronx, New York, U.S.
- Listed height: 6 ft 1 in (1.85 m)
- Listed weight: 220 lb (100 kg)

Career information
- High school: St. Patrick (Elizabeth, New Jersey)
- College: Villanova (2007–2011)
- NBA draft: 2011: undrafted
- Playing career: 2011–2022
- Coaching career: 2023–present

Career history

Playing
- 2011–2012: Antalya Büyükşehir Belediyesi
- 2012–2013: FIATC Joventut
- 2013–2014: Enisey
- 2014: Fujian Sturgeons
- 2015: Cibona Zagreb
- 2015–2016: Guaros de Lara
- 2016–2017: Lietuvos rytas Vilnius
- 2017–2018: San Pablo Burgos
- 2018–2019: Santeros de Aguada
- 2018–2019: Fos Provence Basket
- 2019: Baxi Manresa
- 2019–2020: Ironi Nes Ziona
- 2021–2022: Vichy-Clermont

Coaching
- 2023–2024: Villanova (assistant)
- 2024–2026: Wagner (assistant)

Career highlights
- As player: Third-team All-Big East (2010); Fourth-team Parade All-American (2007)
Medals
Men's basketball
Representing United States
Summer Universiade
Bronze medal – third place	2009 Belgrade	National team

Anthony Guy Corey Fisher (born April 8, 1988) is an American-Georgian former professional basketball player who is now a college assistant coach, most recently at Wagner College as of the 2025–26 season. Fisher played college basketball at Villanova University.

== Early life ==
Fisher was born in The Bronx, New York to Corey Wilson and Kiesha Fisher. Fisher grew up in the Castle Hill Houses, 14 tall brick buildings located in The Bronx. His father lived in a different building in the complex than Corey, his brothers, Ivan and Isaiah; and their mother.

Fisher has said that he often spent time in the nearby playgrounds playing basketball, and was dubbed a "playground legend" after his 105-point game on August 7, 2010. Fisher was named after his uncle, Guy Fisher, ex-drug lord and former owner of the Apollo Theater in Harlem, New York City.

== High school career ==
Fisher played high school basketball for St. Patrick High School in Elizabeth, New Jersey, where he was a Parade All-American in 2007. St. Patrick was a two-hour commute from his home in The Bronx.

'"I looked around at everybody around me; I knew that if I didn't get out of here, I'd never make it"

— Corey Fisher on his decision to attend school in New Jersey

As a Junior, Fisher averaged 14.9 points and 4.2 assists. Fisher was named New Jersey player of the Year by the Newark Star Ledger as a Senior and averaged 22.3 points, 6.1 rebounds and 8 assists. The Celtics went 30–2 and at one point were the number two team in the nation. In February of that year, Fisher led St. Patrick's to an overtime win against West Virginia's Huntington High School led by O. J. Mayo on national television. Fisher led the way with 37 points, while Mayo scored 47. Fisher would also play against eventual Villanova teammate Corey Stokes every year. Fisher closed his high school career with 16 assists in the annual Roundball Classic. Fisher was named an EA Sports All-American. He was also selected to the 2007 Jordan Brand Classic, in which he received MVP honors.

== College career ==
=== Freshman ===
Fisher attended Villanova University and was a member on the basketball team as a Freshman under coach Jay Wright. During the 2007–08 regular season Fisher played every game except the opener against Stony Brook University due to tendonitis in his left knee. Fisher appeared in 34 games, while starting 21 of them. He ranked third on the team in minutes and averaged 9.1 points, 2.7 assists and 1.8 rebounds per game. Fisher produced 92 assists with committing 68 turnovers. He connected on .354 of his attempts from the field (104–294), .331 from three-point range (41–124) and .747 at the foul line (59–79). He scored in double figures 14 times, including three games with at least 20 points. In Big East play, Fisher played all 18 games and started 14 of them. Fisher averaged 8.7 points, 2.7 rebounds and 2.2 assists per game. Fisher's season high for points came in a conference game against DePaul University on January 3, 2008 in which Fisher scored 23 points. His season high in rebounds came on February 20, 2008 against the West Virginia University. Assists came on February 25 against Marquette University.

On November 22, 2007, Fisher scored 18 points against the University of South Florida in the Old Spice Classic, and then followed that up with a 21-point game three days later against North Carolina State University.

Villanova was selected to play in the 2008 NCAA Tournament and advanced as far as the Sweet 16 versus the Kansas Jayhawks in Detroit, Michigan, in which Fisher scored 6 points along with 4 assists in the Wildcats' 72–57 loss.

=== Sophomore ===
As a sophomore during the 2008–09 regular season, Fisher played in all 38 games and made 12 starts.

Fisher averaged 24.3 minutes per game and ranked third on the team in scoring at 10.8 points per game. He also averaged 2.3 rebounds and 2.8 assists per game. He had 107 assists along with 76 turnovers. Fisher was tied for second on the team with 47 steals while shooting .429 from the field, including .319 from three-point range, and .788 from the foul line. Fisher had 23 games scoring in double figures. He was named the Big East Conference Sixth Man of the Year.

In seven games between the Big East and NCAA Tournament, Fisher averaged 10.5 points, 3.4 rebounds and 3.0 assists per game to go along with 8 steals. He averaged 10.4 points and 4.2 rebounds during the NCAA Tournament alone. In the 2009 Elite Eight in Boston, Massachusetts, Fisher scored all seven of his free throws down the stretch to help Villanova defeat the University of Pittsburgh 78–76 to advance to the Final Four. Villanova won the game thanks to Villanova guard Scottie Reynolds's buzzer-beater layup with less than a second remaining on the clock.

=== Junior ===
On November 19, 2009, Fisher finished a 69–68 victory over George Mason University in the first round of the O'Reilly Auto Parts Puerto Rico Tip-off with 17 points and 6 rebounds; 14 of his points being on free-throws, a career high. On November 28, Fisher finished with a career high 6 steals along with 13 points and 4 assists in Villanova's 81–63 win over La Salle University.

On December 6, 2009, Fisher played a key role in Villanova's 95–86 win against the University of Maryland at the BB&T Classic, in which the Wildcats finished with 16 3-point shots made. He finished the night with a season-high 20 points; 4-of-6 from beyond the 3-point arc.

On February 6, 2010, Fisher became the 52nd Villanova player to reach 1,000 career points in a 103–90 win against Georgetown University. During the 2010 NCAA Tournament, Fisher scored 9 points in the Wildcats' second-round game in which they were upset by St. Mary's College of California. Fisher was named to the first team All-Philadelphia Big Five and third team All-Big East. He finished the season averaging 13.3 points, 3.9 assists and 2.8 rebounds.

=== Senior ===
Fisher returned to Villanova his senior year joined in the backcourt by sophomore Maalik Wayns and senior Corey Stokes. He was among the final ten candidates for the Bob Cousy Award.

=== 105-point game ===
On August 7, 2010, Fisher scored 105 points in a single organized summer league game. It is believed to be a new street basketball scoring record, surpassing Fly Williams's previous record of 100 set back in 1978. In the game, played at Watson Gleason Playground in The Bronx, New York City, Fisher scored 105 of his team's 138 points in a 138–130 victory over GymRatsNYC while shooting 23-for-28 from three-point territory.

== Professional career ==
On July 15, 2011, Fisher signed a one-year contract with Antalya BB in Turkey.

After one season in Turkey, Fisher signed in August 2012 for Spanish team Joventut Badalona.

On July 6, 2013, Fisher signed with Enisey Krasnoyarsk of Russia for the 2013–14 season.

After a season in China with Fujian Sturgeons, Fisher signed with KK Cibona in Croatia on July 28, 2015. He was released from Cibona in October 2015. On October 30, 2015, he signed with Guaros de Lara of the Venezuelan Liga Profesional de Baloncesto.

On September 1, 2016, Fisher signed with Lietuvos rytas Vilnius of the Lithuanian Basketball League. On May 24, 2017, it was reported that Fisher along with other American-born teammates Clevin Hannah and Taylor Brown were partying and consuming alcohol in Vilnius nightclubs right after losing the Game 3 of the LKL Playoffs on May 20. All of them were denying the fact but the incontestable pictures were published, which shattered all the doubts. The semi-final game was crucial as following it the series moved to Panevėžys, where Rytas lost the game and the series 1–3, resulting in second shocking fiasco during the same season for the club. On the same May 24, all three players were suspended from the team. On May 25, head coach Rimas Kurtinaitis said that it was not the first time when all three players were behaving unprofessionally and that they were ignoring previous warnings. Some witnesses noted that Taylor Brown previously was also consuming drugs.

On August 4, 2017, Fisher signed with San Pablo Burgos of the Spanish ACB League.

On October 15, 2018, Fisher signed with Fos Provence Basket to replace the injured Tariq Kirksay. On January 3, 2019, Fisher signed with Baxi Manresa for the rest of the season. In 12 games played for Manresa, he averaged 11.8 points, 2.5 rebounds, 4.2 assists and 1.3 steals per game.

On July 30, 2019, Fisher signed a one-year deal with Ironi Nes Ziona of the Israeli Premier League.

=== The Basketball Tournament (TBT) ===
In the summer of 2017, Fisher competed in The Basketball Tournament on ESPN for Supernova; a team composed of Villanova University basketball alum. In two games, he averaged 13.0 points, 3.5 rebounds and 3.5 assists per game to help the number two seeded Supernova advance to the second-round where they were defeated 82–74 by Team Fancy. Fisher also competed for Supernova in 2016 and, prior to that, averaged 10.0 points, 6.0 assists and 3.5 rebounds per game for Team Roby in 2014.

== Coaching career ==
Fisher was hired as an assistant coach on Donald Copeland's staff at Wagner College in 2024, after having spent the previous season as a student-athlete development assistant at Villanova. Fisher spent two seasons with Wagner.

== See also ==
- List of basketball players who have scored 100 points in a single game
