= Thomas Schreiner (basketball) =

Austrian basketball player

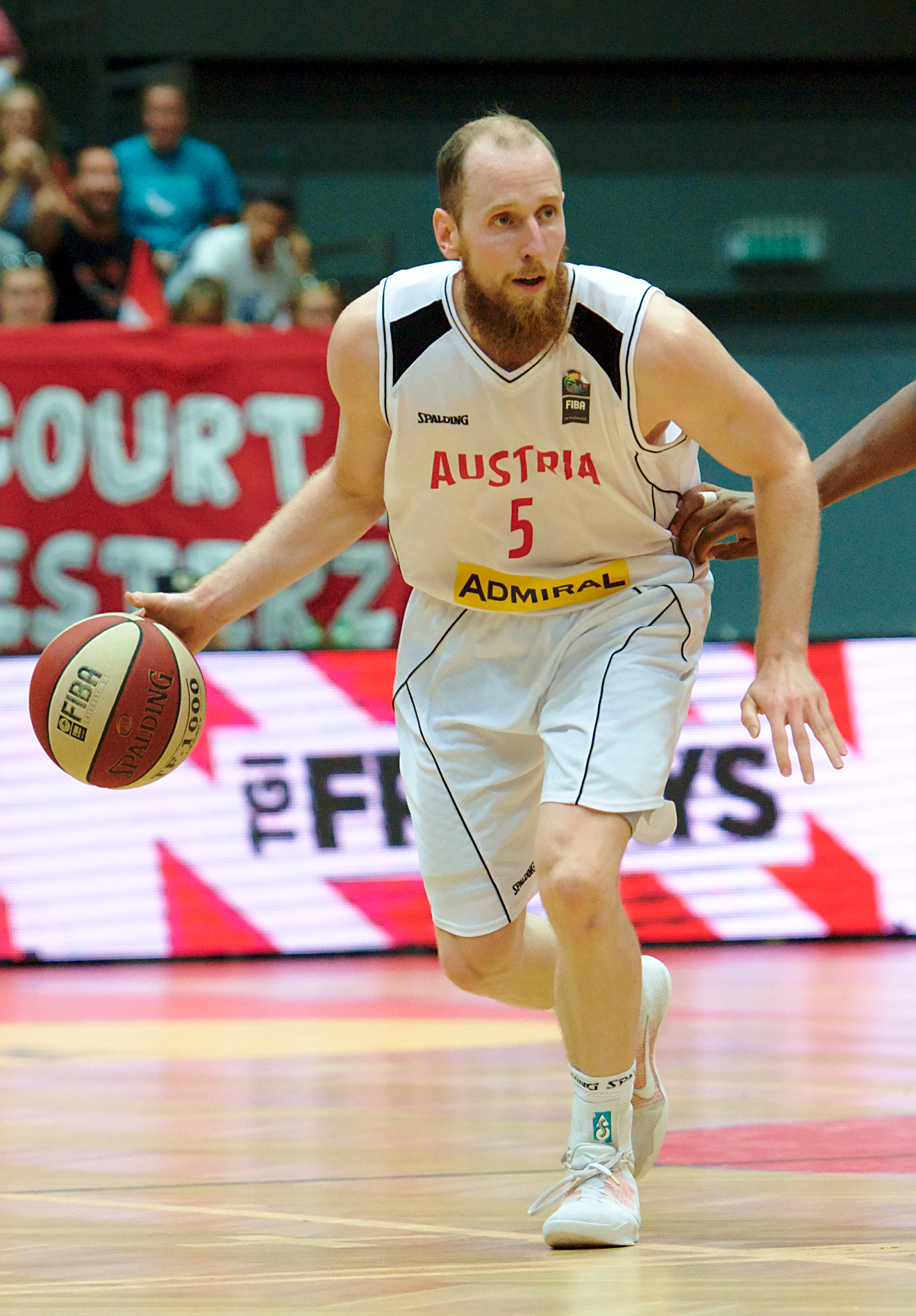
- Schreiner, playing with Austria in 2016

Personal information
- Born: February 3, 1987 (age 39) Sankt Pölten, Austria
- Listed height: 1.95 m (6 ft 5 in)

Career information
- NBA draft: 2009: undrafted
- Playing career: 2004–2023
- Position: Point guard

Career history
- 2004–2006: UBC Sankt Pölten
- 2006–2007: Panthers Fürstenfeld
- 2007–2011: UBC Sankt Pölten
- 2011–2012: Kapfenberg Bulls
- 2012–2017: Andorra
- 2017–2018: Burgos
- 2018–2020: Bilbao
- 2020–2021: Kapfenberg Bulls
- 2021–2022: Força Lleida
- 2022–2023: Andorra

Thomas Schreiner (born February 3, 1987) is an Austrian former professional basketball player.

Schreiner also plays for the Austrian national team.

== Professional career ==
After spending eight seasons in the Austrian ÖBL, Schreiner signed in 2012 with BC Andorra of the LEB Oro, Spanish second division. He promoted with the Andorran team to the top tier, the ACB League in 2014.

In the third round of the 2014–15 ACB season, Schreiner became the MVP of the week.

On July 28, 2022, he has signed with MoraBanc Andorra of the LEB Oro.

== Honours ==
=== BC Andorra ===
- LEB Oro: (1) 2014
- Copa Príncipe de Asturias: (1) 2014
