= Federico Van Lacke =

Argentine professional basketball player (born 1980)

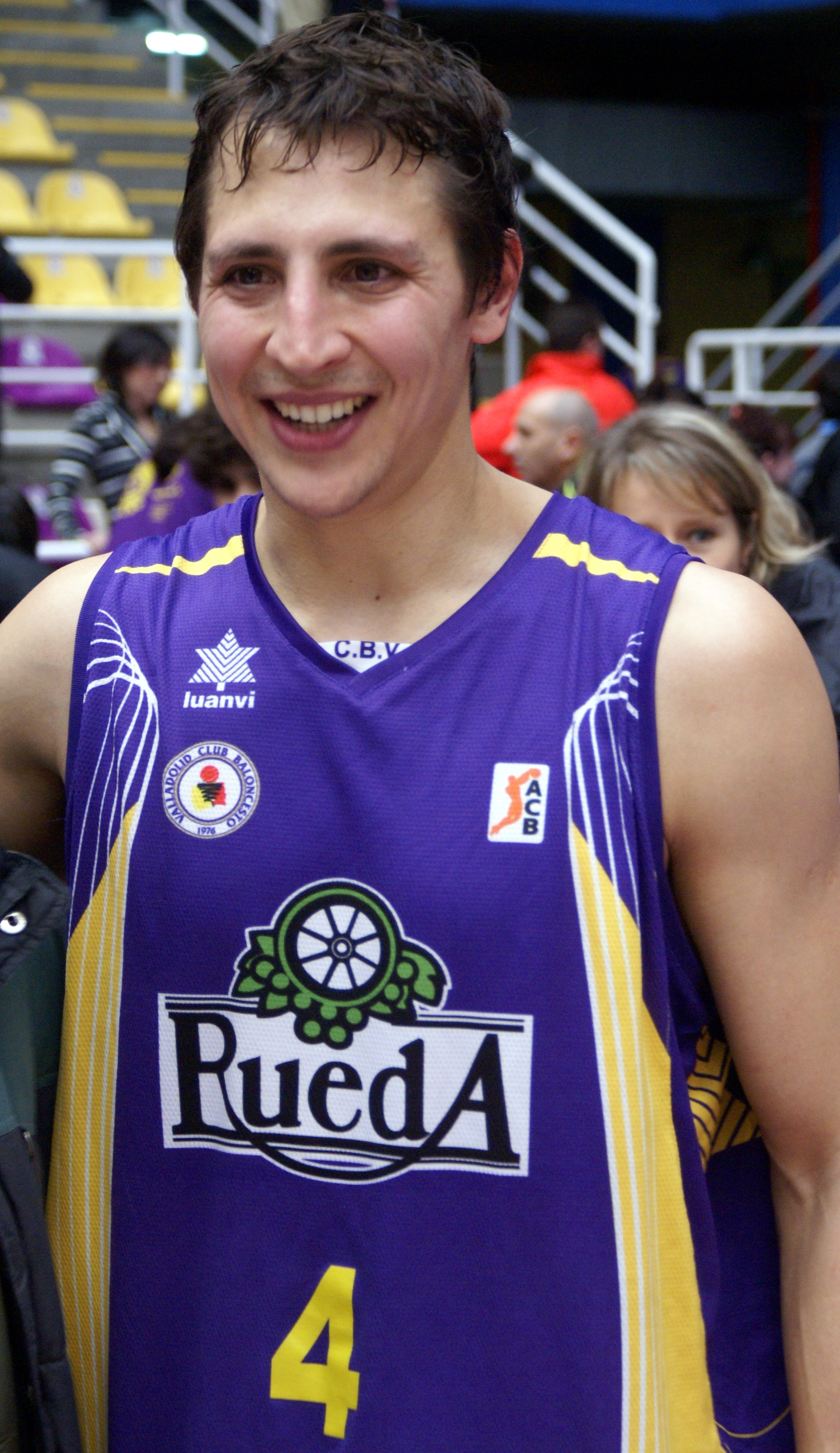
- Van Lacke with CB Valladolid in 2011

Juaristi ISB
- Position: Shooting guard
- League: LEB Plata

Personal information
- Born: June 26, 1980 (age 46) Santa Fe, Argentina
- Listed height: 1.91 m (6 ft 3 in)
- Listed weight: 187 lb (85 kg)

Career information
- Playing career: 1998–present

Career history
- 1998–1999: Atlético Echagüe
- 2002–2003: Cantabria Lobos
- 2003–2004: Murcia
- 2004–2005: Villa de Los Barrios
- 2005–2007: Ciudad de Huelva
- 2007–2008: Granada
- 2008–2011: Valladolid
- 2011–2012: Joventut Badalona
- 2012–2013: Boca Juniors
- 2013–2014: Obras Sanitarias
- 2014–2015: Estudiantes
- 2015–2017: Ciclista Olímpico
- 2017–2019: Gipuzkoa Basket
- 2020–: Iraurgi

Federico Martín Van Lacke Falco (born 26 June 1980 in Santa Fe, Argentina) is an Argentine professional basketball player who plays for Juaristi ISB of the LEB Plata.

== Professional career ==
Trained in Regatas de Santa Fe, Van Lacke signed his first professional contract with Atlético Echagüe of the Argentine Second Division in 1998. After spending three seasons in the club of Paraná, he moved to Spain for playing with Cantabria Lobos of the LEB Oro.

He played five seasons in the Spanish second league before making his debut in Liga ACB, the top league, with CB Granada in 2007. One year later, Van Lacke signs with CB Valladolid, relegated to LEB Oro, where he helps the team to promote to Liga ACB and to qualify it to the 2010 Copa del Rey. In the three seasons that he spent in Valladolid, he was claimed Player of the Month in January 2010.

In 2012, and after playing in seven teams in ten years, he comes back to Argentina for playing with Boca Juniors. Two years later, in 2014, he spends one more season in Spain with Estudiantes before continuing playing in Argentina with Ciclista Olímpico.

== Personal life ==
Since October 2009, Van Lacke attained the dual Spanish-Argentine citizenship.

== Trophies ==
=== With CB Valladolid ===
- LEB Oro: (1)
  - 2009

== Awards and accomplishments ==
- ACB Player of the Month: (1) January 2010
