= 2008–09 LEB Oro season =

2008-09 LEB season
- League: Liga Española de Baloncesto
- Sport: Basketball
- Duration: September 18, 2008-May 15, 2009

Regular season
- Season champions: Valladolid
- Season MVP: (United States) Jakim Donaldson (Ciudad de La Laguna Canarias)
- Top scorer: (Spain) Ricardo Guillén (Villa de Los Barrios)

Play-offs
- Final Four champions: Lucentum Alicante
- Final Four runners-up: Melilla Baloncesto

LEB Oro seasons
- ← 2007-08 2009-10 →

The 2008–09 LEB season is the 13th season of the Liga Española de Baloncesto. The 612-game regular season (34 games for each of the 18 teams) began on Thursday, September 18, 2008, and will end on Friday, May 15, 2009. The champion of the regular season will be promoted to ACB. The teams between 2nd and 9th position will play a best of 3 games play off to see who plays the Final Four. Two bottom teams will be relegated to LEB Plata.

== LEB Oro Regular season ==
Pos.	Teams	Pld	W	L	PF	PA	Avg	Qualification or relegation
1	CB Valladolid	34	25	9	2700	2476	+224	Promotion to Liga ACB
2	Lucentum Alicante	34	25	9	2742	2441	+301	Promotion playoffs
3	Melilla Baloncesto	34	23	11	2714	2554	+160	Promotion playoffs
4	Leche Río Breogán	34	23	11	2661	2584	+77	Promotion playoffs
5	Tenerife Rural	34	21	13	2879	2760	+119	Promotion playoffs
6	Clínicas Rincón Axarquía	34	19	15	2659	2593	+66	Promotion playoffs
7	CB Villa de Los Barrios ^{1}	34	18	16	2594	2550	+44	Promotion playoffs
8	Grupo Begar León	34	18	16	2558	2507	+51	Promotion playoffs
9	Ford Burgos	34	18	16	2762	2708	+54	Promotion playoffs
10	Plus Pujol Lleida ^{2}	34	18	16	2715	2698	+17	
11	Cáceres 2016	34	15	19	2542	2592	-50	
12	CB Vic ^{3}	34	15	19	2578	2664	-86	
13	Ciudad de La Laguna Canarias	34	15	19	2614	2713	-99	
14	UB La Palma	34	14	20	2528	2619	-91	
15	Mallorca	34	12	22	2751	2913	-162	
16	Gandía Bàsquet ^{4}	34	11	23	2507	2677	-170	
17	Illescas Urban CLM	34	8	26	2386	2623	-237	Relegation to LEB Plata
18	Beirasar Rosalía	34	8	26	2488	2706	-218	Relegation to LEB Plata

^{1} CB Villa de Los Barrios relegated due economic problems.
^{2} Plus Pujol Lleida relegated to Liga EBA due economic problems.
^{3} CB Vic relegated due economic problems and sold its berth to CB Sant Josep Girona.
^{4} Gandía Bàsquet relegated to Liga EBA due economic problems.

== LEB Oro playoffs ==
=== Quarterfinals ===
Each quarterfinal was a best-of-three (if third serie necessary) series between teams in the 2-9 positions, with the best-place team receiving home advantage. All opening games were played on May 19, 2009, and all second games were played on May 22. The deciding third games were played on May 24.

Team #1	Agg.	Team #2	1st leg	2nd leg	3rd leg^{*}
Lucentum Alicante	2 - 1	Ford Burgos	89-69	71-75	84-57
Melilla Baloncesto	2 - 0	Grupo Begar Léon	79-56	76-75	
Leche Río Breogán	0 - 2	Villa de Los Barrios	81-89	58-76	
Tenerife Rural	2 - 0	Clínicas Rincón Axarquía	83-77	67-66	

* if necessary

=== Final Four ===
The Final Four is the last phase of the LEB Oro season, and is held over a weekend in Fuenlabrada. The semifinal games are played on May 30. The championship final is played on May 31.

Semifinals
2	Lucentum Alicante	84
7	Villa de Los Barrios	81
3	Melilla Baloncesto	91
5	Tenerife Rural	87

Finals
2	Lucentum Alicante	72
3	Melilla Baloncesto	66

== Stats Leaders ==
=== Points ===
Rank	Name	Team	Games	Points	PPG
1.	(United States) Kammron Taylor	Beirasar Rosalía	20	361	18.05
2.	(Spain) Ricardo Guillén	Villa de Los Barrios	34	605	17.79
3.	(United States) Jason Detrick	Ciudad de La Laguna Canarias	34	601	17.68
4.	(United States) Thomas Terrell	La Palma	31	531	17.13
5.	(Argentina) Diego García	Ford Burgos	33	565	17.12

=== Rebounds ===
Rank	Name	Team	Games	Rebounds	RPG
1.	(United States) Jakim Donaldson	Ciudad de La Laguna Canarias	34	323	9.50
2.	(Brazil) Paulo Prestes	Clínicas Rincón Axarquía	33	309	9.36
3.	(United States) Robert Battle	Valladolid	33	289	8.76
4.	(Spain) Ricardo Guillén	Villa de Los Barrios	34	265	7.79
5.	(United States) Brian Cusworth	Leche Río Breogán	28	205	7.32

=== Assists ===
Rank	Name	Team	Games	Assists	APG
1.	(Argentina) Diego Ciorciari	Melilla Baloncesto	33	201	6.09
2.	(Spain) Javier Mendiburu	Plus Pujol Lleida	33	154	4.67
3.	(Spain) Pedro Sala	La Palma	34	141	4.15
4.	(Spain) Juanjo Jiménez	Illescas Urban CLM	34	129	3.79
5.	(Spain) Daniel López	Leche Río Breogán	30	113	3.77

=== MVP Week by Week ===
Date	Player	Team	Efficiency
1	(Dominican Republic) Eulis Báez (United States) Pat Carroll	Grupo Begar León; Beirasar Rosalia	30
2	(United States) Anthony Stacey (Bosnia and Herzegovina) Nedžad Sinanović	Grupo Begar León; Ford Burgos	30
3	(United States) Jakim Donaldson	Ciudad de La Laguna Canarias	32
4	(Lebanon) Antwain Barbour	Tenerife Rural	33
5	(Spain) Ricardo Guillén	Villa de Los Barrios	28
6	(Dominican Republic) Eulis Báez (Spain) Juan Riera	Grupo Begar León; Mallorca	31
7	(Spain) Ricardo Guillén	Villa de Los Barrios	51
8	(United States) Brian Cusworth	Leche Río Breogán	31
9	(United States) Brian Cusworth	Leche Río Breogán	41
10	(Lebanon) Antwain Barbour	Tenerife Rural	54
11	(United States) Jason Blair	Mallorca	30
12	(United States) Robert Battle	Valladolid	41
13	(United States) Robert Battle	Valladolid	30
14	(Brazil) Vítor Faverani	Clínicas Rincón Axarquía	42
15	(United States) Jakim Donaldson	Ciudad de La Laguna Canarias	39
16	(Spain) Ricardo Guillén	Villa de Los Barrios	42
17	(United States) Wayne Simien	Cáceres 2016	31
18	(Brazil) Paulo Prestes	Clínicas Rincón Axarquía	43
19	(Dominican Republic) Eulis Báez	Grupo Begar León	36
20	(United States) Jason Blair (Austria) Martin Kohlmaier	Mallorca; La Palma	26
21	(United States) Jakim Donaldson	Ciudad de La Laguna Canarias	35
22	(United States) Brian Cusworth	Leche Río Breogán	35
23	(United States) Brian Cusworth	Leche Río Breogán	31
24	(Spain) Juan Riera (Poland) Michal Chylinski	Mallorca; Clínicas Rincón Axarquía	29
25	(United States) Jakim Donaldson	Ciudad de La Laguna Canarias	37
26	(Argentina) Adrián Boccia	Tenerife Rural	28
27	(United States) Brian Cusworth	Leche Río Breogán	30
28	(Argentina) Diego Guaita	Cáceres 2016	37
29	(United States) Brian Cusworth	Leche Río Breogán	32
30	(United States) Zach Morley	Gandía	29
31	(United States) Matt Kiefer	Vic	37
32	(Brazil) Paulo Prestes	Clínicas Rincón Axarquía	40
33	(United States) Charles Ramsdell (United States) Jakim Donaldson	Beirasar Rosalía; Ciudad de La Laguna Canarias	34
34	(Spain) Daniel López	Leche Río Breogán	38
