= 2009–10 LEB Oro season =

- League: LEB Oro
- Sport: Basketball
- Games: 340 (regular season)
- Teams: 18
- TV partner: FEB TV

Regular Season
- Season champions: CAI Zaragoza
- Season MVP: (United States) Jakim Donaldson
- Top scorer: (United Kingdom) Darren Phillip

Play-offs
- Play-offs champions: ViveMenorca
- Play-offs runners-up: Ford Burgos

Copa Príncipe
- Champions: Melilla Baloncesto
- Runners-up: ViveMenorca
- Finals MVP: (United States) Taylor Coppenrath

LEB Oro seasons
- ← 2008–09 2010–11 →

The 2009–10 LEB season is the 14th season of the Liga Española de Baloncesto. The 612-game regular season (34 games for each of the 18 teams) began in September 2009, and ended in June 2010. The champion of the regular season will be promoted to ACB. The teams between 2nd and 9th position will play a best of 5 games play-off, where the winner will be promoted to ACB. The 18th team will be relegated to LEB Plata and the teams 16th and 17th will play a best of 5 games play-out. The loser, will be relegated.

== Regular season ==
#	Teams	GP	W	L	PF	PA	Qualification or relegation
1	Basket CAI Zaragoza	34	27	7	2737	2466	Promotion to Liga ACB
2	Melilla Baloncesto	34	25	9	2631	2372	Promotion playoffs
3	ViveMenorca	34	21	13	2672	2485	Promotion playoffs
4	Ciudad de La Laguna Canarias	34	21	13	2827	2576	Promotion playoffs
5	Ford Burgos	34	21	13	2648	2519	Promotion playoffs
6	Cáceres 2016	34	20	14	2525	2516	Promotion playoffs
7	Baloncesto León	34	19	15	2533	2527	Promotion playoffs
8	Leche Río Breogán	34	19	15	2693	2669	Promotion playoffs
9	Sant Josep Girona	34	17	17	2575	2554	Promotion playoffs
10	UB La Palma	34	16	18	2558	2641	
11	Tenerife Rural	34	16	18	2558	2641	
12	Bàsquet Mallorca	34	16	18	2900	2944	
13	Palencia Baloncesto	34	14	20	2459	2578	
14	Clínicas Rincón	34	13	21	2425	2619	
15	Aguas de Sousas Ourense	34	13	21	2382	2568	
16	Servindustria Tarragona 2017	34	12	22	2500	2647	Relegation playoffs
17	CB Cornellà	34	10	24	2490	2663	Relegation playoffs
18	Kics Ciudad de Vigo	34	6	28	2332	2529	Relegation to LEB Plata

== LEB Oro Playoffs ==
Quarter Finals
2	Melilla Baloncesto	90	83	64	90	87
9	Sant Josep Girona	82	78	81	90	61
5	Ford Burgos	82	91	71	92	X
6	Cáceres 2016	78	77	89	85	X
3	ViveMenorca	72	63	65	73	X
8	Leche Río Breogán	58	61	73	65	X
4	Ciudad de La Laguna	72	82	83	X	X
7	Baloncesto León	65	62	73	X	X

SemiFinals
2	Melilla Baloncesto	64	64	75	78	X
5	Ford Burgos	58	74	82	82	X
3	ViveMenorca	70	50	81	76	66
4	Ciudad de La Laguna	58	68	78	81	61

Finals
3	ViveMenorca	89	65	64	76	78
5	Ford Burgos	65	69	69	64	66

=== Relegation play-out ===
Play-out
16	Tarragona 2017	66	80	77	73	X
17	CB Cornellà	62	74	87	50	X

CB Cornellà is relegated to 2010-11 LEB Plata, but due to financial problems, they will play Liga EBA.

== Stats leaders in the regular season ==
=== Points ===
Rk	Name	Team	Games	Points	PPG
1	(United Kingdom) Darren Phillip	CAI Zaragoza	34	617	18.1
2	(United States) Jakim Donaldson	Ciudad de La Laguna Canarias	34	593	17.4
3	(Spain) Joan Riera	Bàsquet Mallorca	32	552	17.3
4	(United States) Zach Morley	Ford Burgos	34	584	17.2
5	(Spain) Ricardo Guillén	Ciudad de La Laguna Canarias	34	591	15.9

=== Rebounds ===
Rk	Name	Team	Games	Rebounds	RPG
1	(United States) Jakim Donaldson	Ciudad de La Laguna Canarias	34	376	11.1
2	(Czech Republic) Ondřej Starosta	Melilla Baloncesto	34	312	9.2
3	(Bosnia and Herzegovina) Nedžad Sinanović	Clínicas Rincón	31	282	9.1
4	(Brazil) Augusto César Lima	Clínicas Rincón	20	165	8.3
5	(Spain) Óliver Arteaga	Palencia Baloncesto	34	280	8.2

=== Assists ===
Rk	Name	Team	Games	Assists	APG
1	(Argentina) Diego Ciorciari	ViveMenorca	30	146	4.9
2	(Spain) Javier Mendiburu	Servindustria Tarragona 2017	22	97	4.4
3	(Spain) Carlos Cherry	Cáceres 2016	17	73	4.3
4	(Spain) Raúl Mena	UB La Palma	34	140	4.1
5	(Spain) Jorge Jiménez	Melilla Baloncesto	34	120	3.5

=== Efficiency ===
Rk	Name	Team	Games	Efficiency	EPG
1	(United States) Jakim Donaldson	Ciudad de La Laguna Canarias	34	969	28.5
2	(United Kingdom) Darren Phillip	CAI Zaragoza	34	705	20.7
3	(Spain) Óliver Arteaga	Palencia Baloncesto	34	652	19.2
4	(Spain) Ricardo Guillén	Ciudad de La Laguna Canarias	34	651	19.1
4	(United States) Zach Morley	Ford Burgos	34	651	19.1

=== MVP week by week ===
Day	Name	Team	Eff
1	(United States Virgin Islands) Cuthbert Victor (Spain) Ricardo Guillén (United States) Rick Hughes	ViveMenorca; Ciudad de La Laguna Canarias; Baloncesto León	29
2	(United States Virgin Islands) Cuthbert Victor (Spain) Diego Sánchez	ViveMenorca	27
3	(United States) Rick Hughes	Baloncesto León	28
4	(Spain) Álex Urtasun	Baloncesto León	31
5	(United Kingdom) Darren Phillip	CAI Zaragoza	37
6	(United States) Levi Rost	Ciudad de La Laguna Canarias	35
7	(United States) David Padgett	UB La Palma	41
8	(United States) Jakim Donaldson	Ciudad de La Laguna Canarias	39
9	(United Kingdom) Darren Phillip	CAI Zaragoza	57
10	(United States) Jakim Donaldson	Ciudad de La Laguna Canarias	35
11	(United States) Andrew Naymick	Cáceres 2016	35
12	(United States) Jakim Donaldson	Ciudad de La Laguna Canarias	40
13	(United States) Zach Morley	Ford Burgos	42
14	(United States) Jakim Donaldson	Ciudad de La Laguna Canarias	43
15	(Bosnia and Herzegovina) Nedžad Sinanović	Clínicas Rincón	41
16	(Spain) Ricardo Guillén	Ciudad de La Laguna Canarias	35
17	(Bosnia and Herzegovina) Nedžad Sinanović	Clínicas Rincón	36
18	(United States) Ryan Humphrey	Baloncesto León	41
19	(United States) Lou Roe	Tenerife Rural	31
20	(Spain) Carlos Cherry	Cáceres 2016	38
21	(Spain) Joan Riera	Bàsquet Mallorca	31
22	(Spain) Carlos Cherry	Cáceres 2016	37
23	(Spain) Gustavo Ayón	Tenerife Rural	42
24	(United States) Jakim Donaldson	Ciudad de La Laguna Canarias	39
25	(Spain) Óliver Arteaga	Palencia Baloncesto	39
26	(United States) Ryan Humphrey	Baloncesto León	46
27	(United States) Jason Robinson	Melilla Baloncesto	34
28	(United States) Jakim Donaldson	Ciudad de La Laguna Canarias	35
29	(United States) Jakim Donaldson	Ciudad de La Laguna Canarias	36
30	(United States) Jakim Donaldson (Bosnia and Herzegovina) Nedžad Sinanović	Ciudad de La Laguna Canarias; Clínicas Rincón	36
31	(United States) Jakim Donaldson	Ciudad de La Laguna Canarias	40
32	(United States) Eric Coleman (United States) Patrick Pope	Leche Río Breogán; Kics Ciudad de Vigo	33
33	(Brazil) Bruno Fiorotto	Tenerife Rural	31
34	(United States) Jakim Donaldson	Ciudad de La Laguna Canarias	42
