= 2015–16 Real Madrid Baloncesto season =

Real Madrid
2015–16 season
- Chairman: Florentino Pérez
- Head coach: Pablo Laso
- Arena: Barclaycard Center
- Liga ACB: 2nd
- Playoffs: Winners
- Euroleague: Playoffs
- Copa del Rey: Winners
- Supercopa de España: Semi-finals
- Intercontinental Cup: Winners
- Highest home attendance: 13,149
- Lowest home attendance: 6,342
- Average home attendance: 9,709
| Home | Away |

The 2015–16 season was Real Madrid's 85th in existence and their 33rd consecutive season in the top flight of Spanish basketball. The club was involved in five competitions, having completed the Triple Crown last season.

== Players ==
=== Squad information ===
Real Madrid roster
Players
Coaches

| Pos. | No. | Nat. | Name | Ht. | Wt. | Age |
|---|---|---|---|---|---|---|
| C | 14 | (Mexico) | Ayón, Gustavo | 2.08 m (6 ft 10 in) | 113 kg (249 lb) | 31 – 1 April 1985 |
| SG | 20 | (Azerbaijan) | Carroll, Jaycee | 1.88 m (6 ft 2 in) | 77 kg (170 lb) | 33 – 16 April 1983 |
| G/F | 7 | (Slovenia) | Dončić, Luka | 2.01 m (6 ft 7 in) | 99 kg (218 lb) | 17 – 28 February 1999 |
| G/F | 5 | (Spain) | Fernández, Rudy | 1.98 m (6 ft 6 in) | 84 kg (185 lb) | 31 – 4 April 1985 |
| C | 41 | (Spain) | Hernangómez, Willy | 2.10 m (6 ft 11 in) | 113 kg (249 lb) | 22 – 27 May 1994 |
| C | 22 | (Brazil) | Lima, Augusto | 2.06 m (6 ft 9 in) | 104 kg (229 lb) | 24 – 17 September 1991 |
| G | 23 | (Spain) | Llull, Sergio | 1.92 m (6 ft 4 in) | 95.4 kg (210 lb) | 28 – 15 November 1987 |
| SF | 8 | (Lithuania) | Mačiulis, Jonas | 2.01 m (6 ft 7 in) | 107 kg (236 lb) | 31 – 10 February 1985 |
| F/C | 4 | (Senegal) | Ndour, Maurice | 2.06 m (6 ft 9 in) | 91 kg (201 lb) | 24 – 18 June 1992 |
| F | 6 | (Argentina) | Nocioni, Andrés | 2.03 m (6 ft 8 in) | 102 kg (225 lb) | 36 – 30 November 1979 |
| F/C | 9 | (Spain) | Reyes, Felipe (C) | 2.06 m (6 ft 9 in) | 118 kg (260 lb) | 36 – 16 March 1980 |
| SG | 3 | (United States) | Rivers, K. C. | 1.96 m (6 ft 5 in) | 97 kg (214 lb) | 29 – 1 March 1987 |
| PG | 13 | (Spain) | Rodríguez, Sergio | 1.91 m (6 ft 3 in) | 80 kg (176 lb) | 30 – 12 June 1986 |
| G/F | 44 | (Sweden) | Taylor, Jeffery | 2.01 m (6 ft 7 in) | 102 kg (225 lb) | 27 – 23 May 1989 |
| F/C | 33 | (United States) | Thompkins, Trey | 2.08 m (6 ft 10 in) | 111 kg (245 lb) | 26 – 29 May 1990 |

Head coach

- (Spain) Pablo Laso

Assistant coach(es)

- (Spain) Jesús Mateo
- (Spain) Francisco Redondo

Fitness trainer(s)

- (Spain) Juan Trapero

Legend

- (C) Team captain
- Injured

- Roster

=== Depth chart ===
| Pos. | Starting 5 | Bench 1 | Bench 2 | Bench 3 |
|---|---|---|---|---|
| C | Gustavo Ayón | Trey Thompkins | Willy Hernangómez | Augusto Lima |
| PF | Felipe Reyes | Andrés Nocioni | | Maurice Ndour |
| SF | Rudy Fernández | Jonas Maciulis | Luka Dončić |
| SG | Jaycee Carroll | Jeffery Taylor | | K. C. Rivers |
| PG | Sergio Llull | Sergio Rodríguez |

Colours: Blue = homegrown player; Red = non–FIBA Europe player

=== Players in ===
| No. | Pos. | Nat. | Name | Age | Moving from | | Type | Ends | Transfer fee | Date | Source |
|---|---|---|---|---|---|---|---|---|---|---|---|
| | PF | (Spain) | Álex Suárez | 21 | FIATC Joventut | (Spain) | Transfer | 3 years | – | July 14, 2015 | |
| 41 | C | (Spain) | Guillermo Hernangómez | 21 | Baloncesto Sevilla | (Spain) | Back from loan | 1 year | Free | July 16, 2015 | |
| 33 | F | (United States) | Trey Thompkins | 25 | Nizhny Novgorod | (Russia) | End of contract | 1 year | Free | August 26, 2015 | |
| 24 | G/F | (Sweden) | Jeffery Taylor | 26 | Charlotte Hornets | (United States) | End of contract | 1 year | Free | August 27, 2015 | |
| 4 | PF | (Senegal) | Maurice Ndour | 23 | Dallas Mavericks | (United States) | End of contract | 1 year | Free | December 5, 2015 | |
| 3 | G | (United States) | K. C. Rivers | 28 | Bayern Munich | (Germany) | Expired contract | 1 year | Free | December 22, 2015 | |
| 22 | F/C | (Brazil) | Augusto Lima | 24 | Universidad Católica de Murcia | (Spain) | Back from loan | 3 years | Free | January 25, 2015 | |

Total spending: ▼€0

=== Players out ===
| No. | Pos. | Nat. | Name | Age | Moving to | | Type | Transfer fee | Date | Source |
|---|---|---|---|---|---|---|---|---|---|---|
| 50 | C | (Tunisia) | Salah Mejri | 29 | Dallas Mavericks | (United States) | Expired contract | Free | July 30, 2015 | |
| | PF | (Spain) | Álex Suárez | 21 | Dominion Bilbao Basket | (Spain) | Loan | Free | August 13, 2015 | |
| 7 | PG | (Argentina) | Facundo Campazzo | 24 | Universidad Católica de Murcia | (Spain) | Loan | Free | August 20, 2015 | |
| 44 | F/C | (United States) | Marcus Slaughter | 30 | Darüşşafaka Doğuş | (Turkey) | Transfer | – | September 2, 2015 | |
| 4 | G | (United States) | K. C. Rivers | 28 | Bayern Munich | (Germany) | Expired contract | Free | September 8, 2015 | |
| 30 | C | (Greece) | Ioannis Bourousis | 31 | Laboral Kutxa Baskonia | (Spain) | Expired contract | Free | September 27, 2015 | |

Total income: ▲€0

Total expenditure: €0

== Club ==
=== Technical staff ===
| Position | Staff |
|---|---|
| Head coach | Pablo Laso |
| Assistant coach | Jesús Mateo; Francisco Redondo |
| Fitness trainer | Juan Trapero |

Source: Real Madrid

=== Kit ===
Supplier: Adidas / Sponsor: Teka

| Home | Away |

== Pre-season and friendlies ==
Win Loss

| 11 September 2015 1 | Real Madrid (Spain) | 75–80 | (Russia) Khimki | Torrox, Spain |
| 20:00 (CEST) | Scoring by quarter: 21–21, 22–28, 18–22, 14–9 |
| | Pts: Carroll 33; Rebs: Ndiaye 9 Asts: Dončić 9 PIR: Carroll 30 | Boxscore | Pts: Davis 23; Rebs: Todorović 8 Asts: Rice 6 PIR: Davis 29 | Arena: Pabellón Municipal; Attendance: 1,000; Referees: Hierrezuelo, Conde, Zamorano |

| 12 September 2015 2 | Unicaja (Spain) | 74–73 | (Spain) Real Madrid | Alhaurín de la Torre, Spain |
| 20:00 (CEST) | Scoring by quarter: 18–24, 23–9, 15–20, 18–20 |
| | Pts: Smith 16; Rebs: three players 5 Asts: Díaz, Smith 4 PIR: Thomas 18 | Boxscore | Pts: Carroll 28; Rebs: Thompkins 9 Asts: Dončić 10; PIR: Carroll 23 | Arena: Pabellón Municipal; Attendance: 1,500; Referees: Hierrezuelo, Conde, Zamorano |

| 19 September 2015 3 | Baloncesto Sevilla (Spain) | 76–83 | (Spain) Real Madrid | Córdoba, Spain |
| 18:00 (CEST) | Scoring by quarter: 26–14, 14–25, 15–21, 21–23 |
| | Pts: Nachbar 16; Rebs: Balvin 6 Asts: Miljenović 8 PIR: Nachbar, Oriola 17 | Boxscore | Pts: Carroll 36; Rebs: Ayón, dos Anjos 5 Asts: Dončić 6 PIR: Carroll 39 | Arena: Palacio Municipal de Deportes Vista Alegre; Attendance: 2,000; Referees: Conde, Hierrezuelo, García |

| 8 October 2015 4 | Real Madrid (Spain) | 96–111 | (United States) Boston Celtics | Madrid, Spain |
| 21:00 (CEST) | Scoring by quarter: 23–25, 20–29, 26–31, 27–26 |
| | Pts: Thompkins 24; Rebs: Thompkins 8 Asts: Llull 6 | Boxscore | Pts: Bradley 17; Rebs: Lee 11; Asts: Crowder 6 | Arena: Barclaycard Center; Attendance: 13,000; Referees: McCutchen, Taylor, Lamonica |

== Competitions ==
=== Overall ===
| Competition | Started round | Final position / round | First match | Last match |
|---|---|---|---|---|
| Liga ACB | Matchday 1 | 2nd | 11 October 2015 | 22 May 2016 |
| ACB Playoffs | Quarterfinals | Winners | 27 May 2016 | 22 June 2016 |
| Copa del Rey | Quarterfinals | Winners | 19 February 2016 | 21 February 2016 |
| Supercopa de España | Semifinals | Semifinalists | 2 October 2015 | |
| Euroleague | Regular season | Playoffs | 16 October 2015 | 19 April 2016 |
| Intercontinental Cup | Final | Winners | 25 September 2015 | 27 September 2015 |

Updated to match played June 22, 2016
Source: Competitions

=== Overview ===
| Competition | Record | | | | | | | |
| Competition | Pld | W | D | L | PF | PA | PD | Win % |
|---|---|---|---|---|---|---|---|---|
| Liga ACB | 34 | 29 | 0 | 5 | 3,229 | 2,767 | +462 | 85.29 |
| ACB Playoffs | 11 | 8 | 0 | 3 | 1,005 | 906 | +99 | 72.73 |
| Copa del Rey | 3 | 3 | 0 | 0 | 272 | 245 | +27 | 100.00 |
| Supercopa de España | 1 | 0 | 0 | 1 | 79 | 94 | −15 | 0.00 |
| Euroleague | 27 | 12 | 0 | 15 | 2,231 | 2,223 | +8 | 44.44 |
| Intercontinental Cup | 2 | 1 | 0 | 1 | 181 | 170 | +11 | 50.00 |
| Total | 78 | 53 | 0 | 25 | 6,997 | 6,405 | +592 | 67.95 |

Last updated: June 22, 2016
Source: Competitions

=== Intercontinental Cup ===
Win Draw Loss

| 25 September 2015 First leg | Bauru (Brazil) | 91–90 | (Spain) Real Madrid | São Paulo, Brazil |
| 2:00 (CEST) | Scoring by quarter: 19–22, 11–15, 29–25, 32–28 |
| | Pts: Hettsheimeir 27; Rebs: Garcia 7 Asts: Fischer, Garcia 8 | Boxscore | Pts: Carroll 18; Rebs: Fernández, Reyes 6 Asts: Llull 6 | Arena: Ginásio do Ibirapuera; Attendance: 3,500; Referees: Reynaldo Mercedes (DOM), José Reyes (MEX), Christos Christodoulou (GRE) |

| 27 September 2015 Second leg | Real Madrid (Spain) | 91–79 | (Brazil) Bauru | São Paulo, Brazil |
| 17:00 (CEST) | Scoring by quarter: 24–15, 25–25, 17–17, 25–22 |
| | Pts: Carroll 22; Rebs: Ayón 15; Asts: Llull 6 | Boxscore | Pts: Fischer 26; Rebs: Hettsheimeir 6 Asts: Fischer 6 | Arena: Ginásio do Ibirapuera; Attendance: 8,000; Referees: Reynaldo Mercedes (DOM), José Reyes (MEX), Christos Christodoulou (GRE) |

=== Supercopa de España ===
Win Loss

| 2 October 2015 Semifinals | Unicaja | 94–79 | Real Madrid | Málaga |
| 21:30 (CEST) | Scoring by quarter: 17–17, 29–20, 26–15, 22–27 |
| | Pts: Thomas 15; Rebs: Hendrix 6 Asts: Marković 7 PIR: Thomas 14 | Boxscore | Pts: Reyes 18; Rebs: Reyes 10; Asts: Rodríguez 4 PIR: Reyes 25 | Arena: Martín Carpena; Attendance: 10,156; Referees: Pérez Pizarro, Pérez Pérez, Calatrava |

=== Liga ACB ===
==== League table ====
| Pos | Team | Pld | W | L | PF | PA | PD | Qualification or relegation |
|---|---|---|---|---|---|---|---|---|
| 1 | FC Barcelona Lassa | 34 | 29 | 5 | 2835 | 2384 | +451 | Qualification to playoffs |
| 2 | Real Madrid | 34 | 29 | 5 | 3229 | 2767 | +462 | Qualification to playoffs |
| 3 | Valencia Basket | 34 | 28 | 6 | 2831 | 2501 | +330 | Qualification to playoffs |
| 4 | Laboral Kutxa Baskonia | 34 | 24 | 10 | 2987 | 2703 | +284 | Qualification to playoffs |
| 5 | Herbalife Gran Canaria | 34 | 21 | 13 | 2818 | 2705 | +113 | Qualification to playoffs |

Source: ACB

==== Results summary ====
| Overall | | | | | | Home | | | | | Away | | | | |
| Pld | W | L | PF | PA | PD | W | L | PF | PA | PD | W | L | PF | PA | PD |
|---|---|---|---|---|---|---|---|---|---|---|---|---|---|---|---|
| 34 | 29 | 5 | 3229 | 2767 | +462 | 15 | 2 | 1682 | 1383 | +299 | 14 | 3 | 1547 | 1384 | +163 |

Last updated: May 22, 2016.
Source: Competitive matches

==== Results by round ====
| Round | 1 | 2 | 3 | 4 | 5 | 6 | 7 | 8 | 9 | 10 | 11 | 12 | 13 | 14 | 15 | 16 | 17 | 18 | 19 | 20 | 21 | 22 | 23 | 24 | 25 | 26 | 27 | 28 | 29 | 30 | 31 | 32 | 33 | 34 |
|---|---|---|---|---|---|---|---|---|---|---|---|---|---|---|---|---|---|---|---|---|---|---|---|---|---|---|---|---|---|---|---|---|---|---|
| Ground | H | A | H | A | A | H | A | A | H | H | A | A | H | A | H | A | H | A | H | H | A | A | H | A | H | A | H | H | A | H | A | H | H | A |
| Result | L | W | W | W | W | W | W | W | W | W | W | W | L | L | W | L | W | W | W | W | W | W | W | L | W | W | W | W | W | W | W | W | W | W |
| Position | 11 | 7 | 5 | 4 | 4 | 3 | 3 | 3 | 3 | 2 | 2 | 2 | 3 | 3 | 3 | 4 | 4 | 3 | 3 | 3 | 3 | 4 | 3 | 3 | 3 | 3 | 3 | 3 | 3 | 3 | 3 | 3 | 2 | 2 |

Updated to match(es) played on May 22, 2016. Source: Competitive matches
A = Away; H = Home; W = Win; D = Draw; L = Loss

==== Matches ====
Win Loss

| 11 October 2015 1 | Real Madrid | 82–88 | Valencia Basket | Madrid |
| 18:00 (CEST) | Scoring by quarter: 20–17, 17–28, 25–15, 20–28 |
| | Pts: Ayón 16; Rebs: Ayón 9 Asts: Llull 5 PIR: Ayón, Fernández 23 | Boxscore | Pts: Hamilton 24; Rebs: Hamilton 6 Asts: Sikma 7 PIR: Hamilton 26 | Arena: Barclaycard Center; Attendance: 10,543; Referees: Martín Bertrán, Cortés, Sanchez Mohedas |

| 18 October 2015 2 | RETAbet.es GBC | 61–94 | Real Madrid | San Sebastián |
| 19:30 (CEST) | Scoring by quarter: 26–22, 12–34, 7–13, 16–23 |
| | Pts: Vrkić 16; Rebs: Olaizola, Vrkić 3 Asts: Llompart 3 PIR: Vrkić 14 | Boxscore | Pts: Carroll 19; Rebs: Thompkins 7 Asts: Rodríguez 8 PIR: Rodríguez 23 | Arena: San Sebastián Arena; Attendance: 5,326; Referees: Perea, Castillo, Sacristán |

| 25 October 2015 3 | Real Madrid | 112–89 | Iberostar Tenerife | Madrid |
| 19:30 (CET) | Scoring by quarter: 26–18, 28–22, 29–23, 29–26 |
| | Pts: Reyes 21; Rebs: Thompkins 8 Asts: Llull 10; PIR: Reyes 28 | Boxscore | Pts: Hanley 14; Rebs: Sekulić 6 Asts: three players 4 PIR: San Miguel 19 | Arena: Barclaycard Center; Attendance: 8,851; Referees: Peruga, Araña, Caballero |

| 1 November 2015 4 | CAI Zaragoza | 80–88 | Real Madrid | Zaragoza |
| 18:00 (CET) | Scoring by quarter: 17–17, 23–23, 16–24, 24–24 |
| | Pts: Jelovac 23; Rebs: Norel 6 Asts: Bellas 6 PIR: Jelovac 20 | Boxscore | Pts: Ayón, Reyes 21; Rebs: Reyes 8 Asts: Llull, Rodríguez 5 PIR: Ayón 25 | Arena: Pabellón Príncipe Felipe; Attendance: 9,145; Referees: García González, Martínez, Fernández |

| 8 November 2015 5 | Movistar Estudiantes | 75–80 | Real Madrid | Madrid |
| 18:00 (CET) | Scoring by quarter: 19–15, 14–25, 18–19, 24–21 |
| | Pts: three players 16; Rebs: Hernangómez 14; Asts: Salgado 6 PIR: Hernangómez 27 | Boxscore | Pts: Rodríguez 15; Rebs: Thompkins 9 Asts: Fernández 4 PIR: Thompkins 18 | Arena: Barclaycard Center; Attendance: 13,200; Referees: Jiménez, Sánchez Montserrat, Munar |

| 15 November 2015 6 | Real Madrid | 106–68 | ICL Manresa | Madrid |
| 13:00 (CET) | Scoring by quarter: 29–15, 22–17, 28–20, 27–16 |
| | Pts: Ayón 19; Rebs: Hernangómez 8 Asts: Llull 10; PIR: Ayón 33 | Boxscore | Pts: Simon 17; Rebs: Musli 6 Asts: Hernández, Sandul 3 PIR: Simon 17 | Arena: Barclaycard Center; Attendance: 7,929; Referees: Perea, Manuel, Planells |

| 22 November 2015 7 | FIATC Joventut | 69–79 | Real Madrid | Badalona |
| 19:30 (CET) | Scoring by quarter: 12–19, 12–17, 20–25, 25–18 |
| | Pts: Paul 20; Rebs: Drame, Suton 6 Asts: Sàbat, Vidal 4 PIR: Llovet 21 | Boxscore | Pts: Reyes 16; Rebs: Reyes 9 Asts: Llull 4 PIR: Reyes 23 | Arena: Palau Municipal d'Esports; Attendance: 8,942; Referees: Martín Bertrán, García Ortiz, Martínez Díez |

| 29 November 2015 8 | Dominion Bilbao Basket | 92–99 | Real Madrid | Bilbao |
| 19:00 (CET) | Scoring by quarter: 23–17, 23–31, 19–17, 27–34 |
| | Pts: Bertāns 21; Rebs: four players 4 Asts: López 7 PIR: Bertāns 20 | Boxscore | Pts: Carroll 19; Rebs: Dončić 6 Asts: Dončić 4 PIR: Ayón, Dončić 22 | Arena: Bilbao Arena; Attendance: 10,004; Referees: Pérez Pizarro, Araña, Mas Cagide |

| 6 December 2015 9 | Real Madrid | 101–80 | UCAM Murcia | Madrid |
| 13:00 (CET) | Scoring by quarter: 22–19, 29–24, 26–23, 24–14 |
| | Pts: Carroll, Llull 16; Rebs: Hernangómez 7 Asts: Llull 5 PIR: Llull 20 | Boxscore | Pts: Kelati 18; Rebs: Radović 13; Asts: Campazzo 5 PIR: Kelati, Radović 13 | Arena: Barclaycard Center; Attendance: 9,383; Referees: Pérez Pérez, Martínez, Rial |

| 13 December 2015 10 | Real Madrid | 85–68 | Herbalife Gran Canaria | Madrid |
| 19:30 (CET) | Scoring by quarter: 23–20, 16–17, 23–14, 23–17 |
| | Pts: Taylor 17; Rebs: Ayón 11; Asts: Rodríguez 8 PIR: Ayón 19 | Boxscore | Pts: Pangos 11; Rebs: Aguilar 5 Asts: Pangos 4 PIR: Pangos 16 | Arena: Barclaycard Center; Attendance: 8,015; Referees: Bultó, Sánchez Monserrat, Sacristán |

| 19 December 2015 11 | MoraBanc Andorra | 80–99 | Real Madrid | Andorra la Vella |
| 13:00 (CET) | Scoring by quarter: 24–29, 22–22, 15–27, 19–21 |
| | Pts: Shermadini 16; Rebs: Shermadini 5 Asts: Schreiner 4 PIR: Shermadini 23 | Boxscore | Pts: Rodríguez 20; Rebs: Ayón 7 Asts: Ayón, Llull 5 PIR: Ayón 24 | Arena: Poliesportiu d'Andorra; Attendance: 4,183; Referees: Perea, García Ortiz, Martínez Díez |

| 22 December 2015 12 | Rio Natura Monbus Obradoiro | 65–79 | Real Madrid | Santiago de Compostela |
| 19:30 (CET) | Scoring by quarter: 13–26, 22–15, 12–24, 16–14 |
| | Pts: Haws 17; Rebs: Caloiaro 9 Asts: McGrath, Pozas 3 PIR: Haws 14 | Boxscore | Pts: Ayón, Carroll 14; Rebs: Reyes 10; Asts: Rodríguez 5 PIR: Ayón, Hernangómez 17 | Arena: Multiusos Fontes do Sar; Attendance: 6,000; Referees: Arteaga, Oyón, Sanchez Mohedas |

| 27 December 2015 13 | Real Madrid | 84–91 | FC Barcelona Lassa | Madrid |
| 19:00 (CET) | Scoring by quarter: 23–25, 21–25, 14–24, 26–17 |
| | Pts: Rodríguez 14; Rebs: Ayón 8 Asts: Ayón 5 PIR: Carroll 16 | Boxscore | Pts: Doellman 17; Rebs: Satoranský 7 Asts: Satoranský 6 PIR: Satoranský 25 | Arena: Barclaycard Center; Attendance: 13,149; Referees: Hierrezuelo, Calatrava, Manuel |

| 3 January 2016 14 | Laboral Kutxa Baskonia | 86–80 | Real Madrid | Vitoria-Gasteiz |
| 18:00 (CET) | Scoring by quarter: 23–15, 13–25, 26–19, 24–21 |
| | Pts: Bourousis 24; Rebs: Bourousis 8 Asts: Causeur, Hanga 3 PIR: Bourousis 37 | Boxscore | Pts: Rodríguez 20; Rebs: Nocioni 6 Asts: Rodríguez 8 PIR: Rodríguez 24 | Arena: Fernando Buesa Arena; Attendance: 15,544; Referees: Martín Bertrán, Peruga, Pérez Niz |

| 10 January 2016 15 | Real Madrid | 107–83 | Baloncesto Sevilla | Madrid |
| 18:00 (CET) | Scoring by quarter: 30–16, 33–20, 24–29, 20–18 |
| | Pts: Rivers 21; Rebs: Reyes 7 Asts: Rodríguez 10; PIR: Rivers 26 | Boxscore | Pts: Balvin 20; Rebs: Balvin, Oriola 7 Asts: Miljenović 10; PIR: Balvin 31 | Arena: Barclaycard Center; Attendance: 9,105; Referees: Conde, Guirao, Zamorano |

| 17 January 2016 16 | Montakit Fuenlabrada | 91–85 | Real Madrid | Fuenlabrada |
| 19:30 (CET) | Scoring by quarter: 22–22, 25–27, 21–13, 23–23 |
| | Pts: Sobin 24; Rebs: Wear 7 Asts: Popović 7 PIR: Sobin 22 | Boxscore | Pts: Nocioni 21; Rebs: Ayón 5 Asts: Rodríguez 11; PIR: Ayón 24 | Arena: Fernando Martín; Attendance: 5,556; Referees: Pérez Pizarro, Bultó, Oyón |

| 24 January 2016 17 | Real Madrid | 85–80 | Unicaja | Madrid |
| 12:30 (CET) | Scoring by quarter: 27–26, 16–20, 24–19, 18–15 |
| | Pts: Carroll 19; Rebs: four players 4 Asts: Rodríguez 8 PIR: Rodríguez 25 | Boxscore | Pts: Smith, Vázquez 10; Rebs: Thomas 5 Asts: Díaz 5 PIR: Thomas 11 | Arena: Barclaycard Center; Attendance: 9,679; Referees: García González, Calatrava, Aliaga |

| 31 January 2016 18 | ICL Manresa | 70–102 | Real Madrid | Manresa |
| 12:30 (CET) | Scoring by quarter: 16–24, 19–30, 14–25, 21–23 |
| | Pts: Musli 14; Rebs: García, Musli 6 Asts: Musli 3 PIR: Musli 24 | Boxscore | Pts: Carroll 20; Rebs: Hernangómez 10; Asts: Dončić 5 PIR: Rivers 24 | Arena: Nou Congost; Attendance: 4,470; Referees: Peruga, Castillo, Fernández |

| 7 February 2016 19 | Real Madrid | 97–79 | Movistar Estudiantes | Madrid |
| 19:30 (CET) | Scoring by quarter: 22–21, 28–18, 25–22, 22–18 |
| | Pts: Carroll 21; Rebs: Lima 8 Asts: Llull 10; PIR: Ayón 23 | Boxscore | Pts: Martín 27; Rebs: Hernangómez 6 Asts: Laprovíttola 8 PIR: Martín 30 | Arena: Barclaycard Center; Attendance: 9,814; Referees: Pérez Pérez, Araña, Pérez Niz |

| 14 February 2016 20 | Real Madrid | 94–88 | RETAbet.es GBC | Madrid |
| 12:30 (CET) | Scoring by quarter: 34–23, 19–25, 32–21, 9–19 |
| | Pts: Llull 27; Rebs: Lima 7 Asts: Llull 8 PIR: Llull 36 | Boxscore | Pts: Landry 15; Rebs: Doblas 6 Asts: Doblas 5 PIR: Doblas 16 | Arena: Barclaycard Center; Attendance: 8,136; Referees: Conde, Martínez, Zamorano |

| 28 February 2016 21 | Valencia Basket | 94–95 | Real Madrid | Valencia |
| 18:00 (CET) | Scoring by quarter: 28–24, 26–20, 25–26, 15–25 |
| | Pts: Dubljević 17; Rebs: Dubljević 8 Asts: Diot 8 PIR: Sikma 19 | Boxscore | Pts: Carroll 18; Rebs: Nocioni 5 Asts: Llull 7 PIR: Carroll 22 | Arena: Fuente de San Luis; Attendance: 8,500; Referees: Hierrezuelo, Perea, Aliaga |

| 6 March 2016 22 | Herbalife Gran Canaria | 93–103 | Real Madrid | Las Palmas |
| 12:30 (CET) | Scoring by quarter: 24–26, 34–29, 10–24, 25–24 |
| | Pts: Oliver 18; Rebs: Omić 9 Asts: Oliver 6 PIR: Omić 27 | Boxscore | Pts: Ayón 21; Rebs: Mačiulis 7 Asts: Rodríguez 9 PIR: Ayón 33 | Arena: Gran Canaria Arena; Attendance: 9,097; Referees: Pérez Pérez, Calatrava, Sanchez Mohedas |

| 13 March 2016 23 | Real Madrid | 107–78 | MoraBanc Andorra | Madrid |
| 12:30 (CET) | Scoring by quarter: 27–25, 27–20, 29–19, 24–14 |
| | Pts: Thompkins 15; Rebs: Hernangómez 8 Asts: Llull 5 PIR: Hernangómez 20 | Boxscore | Pts: Stojanovski 15; Rebs: Jones 6 Asts: Schreiner 8 PIR: Clark, Stojanovski 11 | Arena: Barclaycard Center; Attendance: 8,614; Referees: García González, Oyón, Martínez Díez |

| 20 March 2016 24 | Iberostar Tenerife | 93–84 | Real Madrid | San Cristóbal de La Laguna |
| 12:30 (CET) | Scoring by quarter: 23–25, 33–18, 16–18, 21–23 |
| | Pts: Richotti 19; Rebs: three players 5 Asts: O'Leary, Richotti 4 PIR: San Miguel 20 | Boxscore | Pts: Rodríguez 21; Rebs: Reyes 5 Asts: Rodríguez 5 PIR: Rodríguez 26 | Arena: Santiago Martín; Attendance: 5,142; Referees: Cortés, Manuel, Serrano |

| 27 March 2016 25 | Real Madrid | 96–84 | CAI Zaragoza | Madrid |
| 18:00 (CEST) | Scoring by quarter: 19–18, 27–16, 33–18, 17–22 |
| | Pts: Carroll 16; Rebs: Dončić 7 Asts: Llull 8 PIR: Carroll 19 | Boxscore | Pts: Benzing 23; Rebs: Kravtsov 8 Asts: Bellas 7 PIR: Jelovac 27 | Arena: Barclaycard Center; Attendance: 7,647; Referees: Arteaga, Castillo, Rial |

| 3 April 2016 26 | UCAM Murcia | 99–104(OT) | Real Madrid | Murcia |
| 18:00 (CEST) | Scoring by quarter: 26–26, 16–26, 24–28, 27–13, Overtime: 6–11 |
| | Pts: Antelo, Vítor Benite 18; Rebs: Antelo 7 Asts: Campazzo 7 PIR: Lishchuk 22 | Boxscore | Pts: Fernández 18; Rebs: Ayón 12; Asts: Llull 6 PIR: Ayón 25 | Arena: Palacio de Deportes; Attendance: 7,596; Referees: Hierrezuelo, Guirao, Zamorano |

| 10 April 2016 27 | Real Madrid | 102–80 | Dominion Bilbao Basket | Madrid |
| | Scoring by quarter: 23–26, 31–19, 22–20, 26–15 |
| | Pts: Carroll 20; Rebs: Lima 13; Asts: Llull 7 PIR: Reyes 21 | Boxscore | Pts: Bertāns 20; Rebs: four players 4 Asts: Hannah, López 4 PIR: Bertāns 20 | Arena: Barclaycard Center; Attendance: 9,658; Referees: Conde, Pérez Niz, Aliaga |

| 17 April 2016 28 | Real Madrid | 91–77 | FIATC Joventut | Madrid |
| 19:30 (CEST) | Scoring by quarter: 25–13, 26–19, 19–24, 21–21 |
| | Pts: Carroll 15; Rebs: Dončić, Fernández 5 Asts: Rodríguez 6 PIR: Fernández 16 | Boxscore | Pts: Drame 17; Rebs: Suton 7 Asts: Ventura 4 PIR: Drame 19 | Arena: Barclaycard Center; Attendance: 8,146; Referees: Bultó, Araña, Munar |

| 24 April 2016 29 | FC Barcelona Lassa | 86–91 | Real Madrid | Barcelona |
| 12:30 (CEST) | Scoring by quarter: 26–17, 26–26, 19–20, 15–28 |
| | Pts: Tomić 19; Rebs: Tomić 12; Asts: Arroyo 8 PIR: Tomić 31 | Boxscore | Pts: Thompkins 25; Rebs: Ayón, Thompkins 7 Asts: Mačiulis, Rodríguez 6 PIR: Rodríguez 31 | Arena: Palau Blaugrana; Attendance: 6,627; Referees: García González, Peruga, Manuel |

| 1 May 2016 30 | Real Madrid | 111–81 | Rio Natura Monbus Obradoiro | Madrid |
| 12:30 (CEST) | Scoring by quarter: 21–16, 33–19, 27–22, 30–24 |
| | Pts: Carroll 17; Rebs: Ayón 9 Asts: Ayón 6 PIR: Ayón 24 | Boxscore | Pts: Haws 20; Rebs: four players 5 Asts: four players 3 PIR: Haws, Yusta 20 | Arena: Barclaycard Center; Attendance: 6,342; Referees: Pérez Pizarro, Guirao, Serrano |

| 8 May 2016 31 | Unicaja | 62–88 | Real Madrid | Málaga |
| 12:30 (CEST) | Scoring by quarter: 18–19, 16–24, 21–17, 7–28 |
| | Pts: Kuzminskas 18; Rebs: Thomas 9 Asts: Thomas 4 PIR: Kuzminskas 15 | Boxscore | Pts: Carroll 20; Rebs: Mačiulis 5 Asts: Rodríguez 7 PIR: Carroll 19 | Arena: Martín Carpena; Attendance: 10,524; Referees: Jiménez Trujillo, Cortés, Caballero |

| 11 May 2016 32 | Real Madrid | 129–81 | Montakit Fuenlabrada | Madrid |
| 20:00 (CEST) | Scoring by quarter: 27–15, 33–21, 37–21, 32–24 |
| | Pts: Thompkins 25; Rebs: Ayón 10; Asts: Rodríguez 19; PIR: Rodríguez 31 | Boxscore | Pts: Urtasun 18; Rebs: Demetrio, Paunić 4 Asts: Úriz 8 PIR: Urtasun 15 | Arena: Barclaycard Center; Attendance: 6,566; Referees: Pérez Pérez, Bultó, Planells |

| 18 May 2016 33 | Real Madrid | 93–88 | Laboral Kutxa Baskonia | Madrid |
| 21:00 (CEST) | Scoring by quarter: 29–19, 24–19, 22–21, 18–29 |
| | Pts: Llull 24; Rebs: Ayón 14; Asts: Ayón 6 PIR: Ayón 39 | Boxscore | Pts: James 17; Rebs: Diop, Hanga 7 Asts: Adams, Hanga 3 PIR: Bertāns 19 | Arena: Barclaycard Center; Attendance: 7,751; Referees: Conde, Perea, Rial |

| 22 May 2016 34 | Baloncesto Sevilla | 90–97 | Real Madrid | Sevilla |
| 12:30 (CEST) | Scoring by quarter: 20–23, 24–22, 24–28, 22–24 |
| | Pts: Håkanson 26; Rebs: Jordan 8 Asts: Håkanson, Sánchez 3 PIR: Håkanson 29 | Boxscore | Pts: Ayón 23; Rebs: Ayón 15; Asts: Rodríguez 9 PIR: Ayón 35 | Arena: San Pablo; Attendance: 7,260; Referees: García González, Manuel, Cardús |

==== Results overview ====
Win Draw Loss

| Opposition | Home score | Away score | Double |
|---|---|---|---|
| Baloncesto Sevilla | 107–83 | 90–97 | 204–173 |
| CAI Zaragoza | 96–84 | 80–88 | 184–164 |
| Dominion Bilbao Basket | 102–80 | 92–99 | 201–172 |
| FC Barcelona Lassa | 84–91 | 86–91 | 175–177 |
| FIATC Joventut | 91–77 | 69–79 | 170–146 |
| Herbalife Gran Canaria | 85–68 | 93–103 | 188–161 |
| Iberostar Tenerife | 112–89 | 93–84 | 196–182 |
| ICL Manresa | 106–68 | 70–102 | 208–138 |
| Laboral Kutxa Baskonia | 93–88 | 86–80 | 173–174 |
| Montakit Fuenlabrada | 129–81 | 91–85 | 214–172 |
| MoraBanc Andorra | 107–78 | 80–99 | 206–158 |
| Movistar Estudiantes | 97–79 | 75–80 | 177–154 |
| RETAbet.es GBC | 94–88 | 61–94 | 188–149 |
| Rio Natura Monbus Obradoiro | 111–81 | 65–79 | 190–146 |
| UCAM Murcia | 101–80 | 99–104 | 205–179 |
| Unicaja | 85–80 | 62–88 | 173–142 |
| Valencia Basket | 82–88 | 94–95 | 177–182 |

=== ACB Playoffs ===
Win Loss

==== Quarterfinals ====
| 27 May 2016 1st leg | Real Madrid | 107–103 | UCAM Murcia | Madrid |
| 21:15 (CEST) | Scoring by quarter: 21–28, 28–21, 30–21, 28–33 |
| | Pts: Llull 26; Rebs: Ayón, Thompkins 5 Asts: Rodríguez 10; PIR: Llull 29 | Boxscore | Pts: Antelo 27; Rebs: four players 3 Asts: Campazzo 9 PIR: Campazzo 33 | Arena: Barclaycard Center; Attendance: 8,294; Referees: Pérez Pizarro, Araña, Aliaga |

| 29 May 2016 2nd leg | UCAM Murcia | 91–87 | Real Madrid | Murcia |
| 20:30 (CEST) | Scoring by quarter: 26–31, 21–19, 24–18, 20–19 |
| | Pts: Campazzo, Faverani 19; Rebs: Faverani 6 Asts: Campazzo 4 PIR: Campazzo 19 | Boxscore | Pts: Reyes 21; Rebs: Reyes 8 Asts: Llull, Rodríguez 5 PIR: Reyes 27 | Arena: Palacio de Deportes; Attendance: 6,342; Referees: Hierrezuelo, Martínez, Manuel |

| 31 May 2016 3rd leg | Real Madrid | 93–72 | UCAM Murcia | Madrid |
| 21:00 (CEST) | Scoring by quarter: 28–10, 26–23, 14–12, 25–27 |
| | Pts: Ayón, Carroll 18; Rebs: Ayón 8 Asts: Rodríguez 7 PIR: Ayón 33 | Boxscore | Pts: Campazzo 22; Rebs: Antelo, Campazzo 6 Asts: Campazzo 7 PIR: Campazzo 24 | Arena: Barclaycard Center; Attendance: 8,684; Referees: Martín Bertrán, García González, Peruga |

==== Semifinals ====
| 2 June 2016 1st leg | Real Madrid | 82–57 | Valencia Basket | Madrid |
| 21:00 (CEST) | Scoring by quarter: 14–19, 17–7, 16–16, 35–15 |
| | Pts: Carroll 15; Rebs: Nocioni 6 Asts: Llull 4 PIR: Llull 19 | Boxscore | Pts: Diot, Shurna 10; Rebs: Hamilton 6 Asts: Martínez 4 PIR: three players 10 | Arena: Barclaycard Center; Attendance: 8,696; Referees: García González, Pérez Pérez, Manuel |

| 4 June 2016 2nd leg | Real Madrid | 97–88 | Valencia Basket | Madrid |
| 21:00 (CEST) | Scoring by quarter: 19–10, 22–29, 21–24, 35–25 |
| | Pts: Llull 19; Rebs: Fernández 7 Asts: Rodríguez 7 PIR: Ayón 24 | Boxscore | Pts: Dubljević 19; Rebs: Hamilton 10; Asts: Diot 6 PIR: Dubljević 26 | Arena: Barclaycard Center; Attendance: 10,013; Referees: Martín Bertrán, Perea, Martínez |

| 7 June 2016 3rd leg | Valencia Basket | 87–86(OT) | Real Madrid | Valencia |
| 21:00 (CEST) | Scoring by quarter: 25–19, 22–26, 17–11, 10–18, Overtime: 13–12 |
| | Pts: Lučić 18; Rebs: Dubljević 7 Asts: Vives 7 PIR: Lučić 21 | Boxscore | Pts: Fernández 22; Rebs: Ayón 9 Asts: Fernández 6 PIR: Fernández 27 | Arena: Fuente de San Luis; Attendance: 8,500; Referees: Hierrezuelo, Pérez Pizarro, Bultó |

| 9 June 2016 4th leg | Valencia Basket | 80–82 | Real Madrid | Valencia |
| 21:00 (CEST) | Scoring by quarter: 18–25, 20–19, 15–9, 27–29 |
| | Pts: Hamilton 23; Rebs: Hamilton 10; Asts: Vives 5 PIR: Hamilton 31 | Boxscore | Pts: Carroll 17; Rebs: Ayón 8 Asts: Llull 4 PIR: Llull 20 | Arena: Fuente de San Luis; Attendance: 8,500; Referees: García González, Conde, Araña |

==== Finals ====
| 15 June 2016 1st leg | FC Barcelona Lassa | 100–99 | Real Madrid | Barcelona |
| 20:30 (CEST) | Scoring by quarter: 22–22, 25–26, 33–27, 20–24 |
| | Pts: Doellman 19; Rebs: Tomić 8 Asts: Tomić 8 PIR: Tomić 24 | Boxscore | Pts: Carroll 21; Rebs: Ayón 6 Asts: Llull 10; PIR: Carroll 26 | Arena: Palau Blaugrana; Attendance: 6,471; Referees: García González, Pérez Pérez, Calatrava |

| 17 June 2016 2nd leg | FC Barcelona Lassa | 70–90 | Real Madrid | Barcelona |
| 19:00 (CEST) | Scoring by quarter: 12–28, 20–16, 26–22, 12–24 |
| | Pts: Tomić 14; Rebs: Doellman, Tomić 5 Asts: Satoranský 5 PIR: Perperoglou, Samuels 14 | Boxscore | Pts: Llull 20; Rebs: Ayón 6 Asts: Rodríguez 5 PIR: Ayón 28 | Arena: Palau Blaugrana; Attendance: 6,742; Referees: Hierrezuelo, Jiménez, Peruga |

| 20 June 2016 3rd leg | Real Madrid | 91–74 | FC Barcelona Lassa | Madrid |
| 20:00 (CEST) | Scoring by quarter: 29–21, 25–20, 23–17, 14–16 |
| | Pts: Llull 21; Rebs: Ayón 6 Asts: Llull 7 PIR: Llull 30 | Boxscore | Pts: Tomić 18; Rebs: Doellman 8 Asts: Ribas 6 PIR: Doellman 21 | Arena: Barclaycard Center; Attendance: 12,038; Referees: Pérez Pizarro, Conde, Cortés |

| 22 June 2016 4th leg | Real Madrid | 91–84 | FC Barcelona Lassa | Madrid |
| 20:30 (CEST) | Scoring by quarter: 19–26, 26–21, 27–18, 19–19 |
| | Pts: Llull 21; Rebs: Ayón 9 Asts: Reyes 6 PIR: Llull 23 | Boxscore | Pts: Satoranský, Tomić 17; Rebs: Tomić 8 Asts: Navarro 7 PIR: Satoranský 25 | Arena: Barclaycard Center; Attendance: 12,173; Referees: Hierrezuelo, García González, Jiménez |

=== Euroleague ===
==== Regular season ====
| Pos | Team | Pld | W | L | PF | PA | PD | Qualification |
|---|---|---|---|---|---|---|---|---|
| 1 | (Turkey) Fenerbahçe | 10 | 8 | 2 | 770 | 707 | +63 | Advance to Top 16 |
| 2 | (Russia) Khimki | 10 | 5 | 5 | 798 | 740 | +58 | Advance to Top 16 |
| 3 | (Serbia) Crvena Zvezda Telekom | 10 | 5 | 5 | 766 | 813 | −47 | Advance to Top 16 |
| 4 | (Spain) Real Madrid | 10 | 5 | 5 | 854 | 808 | +46 | Advance to Top 16 |
| 5 | (Germany) Bayern Munich | 10 | 4 | 6 | 763 | 780 | −17 | Transfer to Eurocup |
| 6 | (France) Strasbourg | 10 | 3 | 7 | 711 | 814 | −103 | Transfer to Eurocup |

Source: Euroleague

Win Loss

| 16 October 2015 1 | Khimki (Russia) | 84–70 | (Spain) Real Madrid | Khimki, Russia |
| 19:00 (CEST) | Scoring by quarter: 21–14, 22–18, 18–17, 23–21 |
| | Pts: Todorović 15; Rebs: Rice, Todorović 8 Asts: Augustine 4 PIR: Todorović 22 | Boxscore | Pts: Llull 20; Rebs: Ayón 7 Asts: three players 3 PIR: Llull 19 | Arena: Basketball Center of Moscow Region; Attendance: 3,507; Referees: Sreten Radović (CRO), Damir Javor (SLO), Marcin Kowalski (POL) |

| 22 October 2015 2 | Real Madrid (Spain) | 98–71 | (Serbia) Crvena Zvezda | Madrid, Spain |
| 22:00 (CEST) | Scoring by quarter: 22–6, 34–14, 26–21, 16–30 |
| | Pts: Carroll 19; Rebs: Reyes 8 Asts: Rodríguez 11; PIR: Ayón 26 | Boxscore | Pts: Zirbes 15; Rebs: Zirbes 6 Asts: Jović 9 PIR: Jović 20 | Arena: Barclaycard Center; Attendance: 11,486; Referees: Fernando Rocha (POR), Spiros Gkontas (GRE), David Romano (ISR) |

| 30 October 2015 3 | Fenerbahçe (Turkey) | 77–66 | (Spain) Real Madrid | Istanbul, Turkey |
| 20:45 (CET) | Scoring by quarter: 20-18, 19-14, 24-24, 14-10 |
| | Pts: Udoh, Datome 15; Rebs: Udoh 6 Asts: Sloukas 6 PIR: Bogdanović 16 | Boxscore | Pts: Reyes 15; Rebs: Ayón 10; Asts: Llull 5 PIR: Reyes 19 | Arena: Ülker Sports Arena; Attendance: 12,886; Referees: Luigi Lamonica (ITA), Milivoje Jovčić (SRB), Siniša Herceg (CRO) |

| 5 November 2015 4 | Real Madrid (Spain) | 101–99 | (Germany) Bayern Munich | Madrid, Spain |
| 20:45 (CET) | Scoring by quarter: 33–20, 18–31, 22–30, 28–18 |
| | Pts: Fernández, Reyes 20; Rebs: Reyes 11; Asts: Rodríguez 7 PIR: Reyes 30 | Boxscore | Pts: Đedović 22; Rebs: Taylor 6 Asts: Gavel; PIR: Đedović 20 | Arena: Barclaycard Center; Attendance: 9,037; Referees: Elias Koromilas (GRE), Jakub Zamojski (POL), Tolga Sahin (ITA) |

| 13 November 2015 5 | Strasbourg (France) | 93–86 | (Spain) Real Madrid | Strasbourg, France |
| 20:30 (CET) | Scoring by quarter: 24–25, 27–19, 27–19, 15–23 |
| | Pts: Campbell 23; Rebs: Travis 5 Asts: Beaubois 6 PIR: Beaubois, Campbell 19 | Boxscore | Pts: Taylor 21; Rebs: Reyes 7 Asts: Llull 6 PIR: Llull 25 | Arena: Rhénus Sport; Attendance: 6,167; Referees: Damir Javor (SLO), Panagioutis Anastopoulos (GRE), Tomislav Hordov (CRO) |

| 18 November 2015 6 | Real Madrid (Spain) | 82–85 | (Russia) Khimki | Madrid, Spain |
| 20:45 (CET) | Scoring by quarter: 22–24, 20–20, 21–22, 19–19 |
| | Pts: Rodríguez 17; Rebs: Ayón 15; Asts: Fernández 4 PIR: Ayón 30 | Boxscore | Pts: Rice 18; Rebs: Davis 10; Asts: Rice 8 PIR: Davis 16 | Arena: Barclaycard Center; Attendance: 9,310; Referees: Saša Pukl (SLO), Eddie Viator (FRA), Piotr Pastusiak (POL) |

| 27 November 2015 7 | Crvena Zvezda (Serbia) | 94–88 | (Spain) Real Madrid | Belgrade, Serbia |
| 20:00 (CET) | Scoring by quarter: 28–18, 18–25, 20–24, 28–21 |
| | Pts: Zirbes 26; Rebs: Miller 7 Asts: three players 4 PIR: Zirbes 32 | Boxscore | Pts: Ayón, Rodríguez 16; Rebs: Ayón 7 Asts: Rodríguez 9 PIR: Rodríguez 31 | Arena: Pionir; Attendance: 6,744; Referees: Robert Lottermosser (GER), Carmelo Paternico (ITA), Seffi Shemmesh (ISR) |

| 3 December 2015 8 | Real Madrid (Spain) | 80–73 | (Turkey) Fenerbahçe | Madrid, Spain |
| 20:45 (CET) | Scoring by quarter: 18–28, 18–17, 20–10, 24–18 |
| | Pts: Llull 17; Rebs: Reyes, Hernangómez 6 Asts: Llull 4 PIR: Ayón 19 | Boxscore | Pts: Veselý 20; Rebs: Veselý 8 Asts: Sloukas 6 PIR: Veselý 22 | Arena: Barclaycard Center; Attendance: 10,483; Referees: Sreten Radović (CRO), Elias Kormilas (GRE), Jakub Zamojski (POL) |

| 11 December 2015 9 | Bayern Munich (Germany) | 67–86 | (Spain) Real Madrid | Munich, Germany |
| 20:00 (CET) | Scoring by quarter: 18–20, 20–16, 13–29, 16–21 |
| | Pts: Rivers 22; Rebs: Savanović 8 Asts: Gavel 5 PIR: Rivers 17 | Boxscore | Pts: Ayón 22; Rebs: Ayón 9 Asts: Rodríguez 10; PIR: Ayón 41 | Arena: Audi Dome; Attendance: 6,700; Referees: Christos Christodoulou (GRE), Matej Boltauzer (SLO), Tolga Sahin (ITA) |

| 17 December 2015 10 | Real Madrid (Spain) | 97–65 | (France) Strasbourg | Madrid, Spain |
| 20:45 (CET) | Scoring by quarter: 29–15, 23–22, 23–13, 22–15 |
| | Pts: Taylor 16; Rebs: Reyes 7 Asts: Dončić 7 PIR: Reyes 18 | Boxscore | Pts: Beaubois 17; Rebs: Golubović 9 Asts: Campbell 5 PIR: Golubović 12 | Arena: Barclaycard Center; Attendance: 10,868; Referees: Luigi Lamonica (ITA), Oļegs Latiševs (LAT), Ioannis Foufis (GRE) |

==== Top 16 ====
| Pos | Team | Pld | W | L | PF | PA | PD | Qualification |
|---|---|---|---|---|---|---|---|---|
| 1 | (Russia) CSKA Moscow | 14 | 10 | 4 | 1299 | 1185 | +114 | Advance to Playoffs |
| 2 | (Spain) Laboral Kutxa | 14 | 9 | 5 | 1110 | 1075 | +35 | Advance to Playoffs |
| 3 | (Spain) FC Barcelona Lassa | 14 | 8 | 6 | 1085 | 1059 | +26 | Advance to Playoffs |
| 4 | (Spain) Real Madrid | 14 | 7 | 7 | 1173 | 1165 | +8 | Advance to Playoffs |
| 5 | (Russia) Khimki | 14 | 7 | 7 | 1164 | 1138 | +26 | |
| 6 | (Germany) Brose Baskets | 14 | 7 | 7 | 1073 | 1088 | −15 | |
| 7 | (Greece) Olympiacos | 14 | 6 | 8 | 1083 | 1105 | −22 | |
| 8 | (Lithuania) Žalgiris | 14 | 2 | 12 | 1007 | 1179 | −172 | |

Source: Euroleague

Win Loss

| 30 December 2015 1 | Real Madrid (Spain) | 82–79 | (Germany) Brose Baskets | Madrid, Spain |
| 20:45 (CET) | Scoring by quarter: 13–19, 17–21, 27–20, 25–19 |
| | Pts: Rodríguez 22; Rebs: Ayón 8 Asts: Rodríguez 8 PIR: Rodríguez 28 | Boxscore | Pts: Strēlnieks 16; Rebs: Miller 7 Asts: Strēlnieks 5 PIR: Strēlnieks 19 | Arena: Barclaycard Center; Attendance: 9,283; Referees: Milivoje Jovčić (SRB), Damir Javor (SLO), Boris Shulga (UKR) |

| 7 January 2016 2 | CSKA Moscow (Russia) | 95–81 | (Spain) Real Madrid | Moscow, Russia |
| 18:00 (CET) | Scoring by quarter: 22–20, 28–21, 21–23, 24–17 |
| | Pts: de Colo 28; Rebs: three players 5 Asts: de Colo, Teodosić 7 PIR: de Colo 29 | Boxscore | Pts: Rivers 23; Rebs: Ayón 10; Asts: Rodríguez 13; PIR: Ayón, Rivers 23 | Arena: USH CSKA; Attendance: 5,000; Referees: Sreten Radović (CRO), Carmelo Paternico (ITA), Sašo Petek (SLO) |

| 15 January 2016 3 | Real Madrid (Spain) | 92–86 | (Lithuania) Žalgiris | Madrid, Spain |
| 20:45 (CET) | Scoring by quarter: 26–18, 19–24, 20–11, 27–33 |
| | Pts: Reyes 24; Rebs: Ayón 15; Asts: Rodríguez 9 PIR: Reyes 32 | Boxscore | Pts: Seibutis 13; Rebs: Sajus 5 Asts: Kalnietis 6 PIR: Seibutis 17 | Arena: Barclaycard Center; Attendance: 10,271; Referees: Christos Christodoulou (GRE), Ilija Belošević (SRB), Tolga Sahin (ITA) |

| 21 January 2016 4 | Real Madrid (Spain) | 86–87 | (Spain) FC Barcelona Lassa | Madrid, Spain |
| 20:45 (CET) | Scoring by quarter: 27–17, 21–20, 15–25, 23–25 |
| | Pts: Rodríguez 18; Rebs: Reyes 7 Asts: Rodríguez 13; PIR: Rodríguez 27 | Boxscore | Pts: Doellman 24; Rebs: Lawal 6 Asts: Satoranský 8 PIR: Doellman 26 | Arena: Barclaycard Center; Attendance: 12,018; Referees: Fernando Rocha (POR), Elias Koromilas (GRE), Oļegs Latiševs (LAT) |

| 28 January 2016 5 | Real Madrid (Spain) | 84–72 | (Greece) Olympiacos | Madrid, Spain |
| 20:45 (CET) | Scoring by quarter: 17–19, 24–16, 22–13, 21–24 |
| | Pts: Llull 18; Rebs: Ayón 10; Asts: Llull 7 PIR: Llull 22 | Boxscore | Pts: Hackett, Hunter 14; Rebs: Hunter 11; Asts: Spanoulis 4 PIR: Hunter 20 | Arena: Barclaycard Center; Attendance: 11,225; Referees: Robert Lottermoser (GER), Eddie Viator (FRA), Marko Juras (SRB) |

| 5 February 2016 6 | Real Madrid (Spain) | 68–77 | (Spain) Laboral Kutxa | Madrid, Spain |
| 20:45 (CET) | Scoring by quarter: 19–19, 18–22, 12–18, 19–18 |
| | Pts: Rodríguez 18; Rebs: Hernangómez 8 Asts: Llull, Rodríguez 4 PIR: Rodríguez 18 | Boxscore | Pts: Causeur 15; Rebs: Bourousis 14; Asts: Adams 4 PIR: Causeur 17 | Arena: Barclaycard Center; Attendance: 11,088; Referees: Saša Pukl (SLO), Spiros Gkontas (GRE), Matej Boltauzer (SLO) |

| 11 February 2016 7 | Khimki (Russia) | 82–93 | (Spain) Real Madrid | Moscow, Russia |
| 18:00 (CET) | Scoring by quarter: 26–26, 24–17, 19–28, 13–22 |
| | Pts: Augustine 20; Rebs: Augustine 7 Asts: Rice 9 PIR: Augustine 26 | Boxscore | Pts: Ayón 24; Rebs: Ayón 13; Asts: Llull 11; PIR: Ayón 41 | Arena: Krylatskoye Sports Palace; Attendance: 3,800; Referees: Luigi Lamonica (ITA), Tomislav Hordov (CRO), Sašo Petek (SLO) |

| 25 February 2016 8 | Brose Baskets (Germany) | 86–90 | (Spain) Real Madrid | Nuremberg, Germany |
| 20:00 (CET) | Scoring by quarter: 26–23, 19–23, 20–26, 21–18 |
| | Pts: Miller 20; Rebs: Melli 7 Asts: Zisis 4 PIR: Miller 20 | Boxscore | Pts: Llull 21; Rebs: Ayón 7 Asts: Rodríguez 10; PIR: Llull 25 | Arena: Arena Nürnberger Versicherung; Attendance: 8,200; Referees: Christos Christodoulou (GRE), Sreten Radović (CRO), Milija Vojinović (SRB) |

| 2 March 2016 9 | Real Madrid (Spain) | 87–96 | (Russia) CSKA Moscow | Madrid, Spain |
| 20:45 (CET) | Scoring by quarter: 18–18, 19–24, 25–22, 25–32 |
| | Pts: Ayón 20; Rebs: Ayón 12; Asts: Llull 10; PIR: Ayón 29 | Boxscore | Pts: Hines 16; Rebs: Kurbanov 8 Asts: de Colo 8 PIR: Khryapa 19 | Arena: Barclaycard Center; Attendance: 11,792; Referees: Milivoje Jovčić (SRB), Carmelo Paternico (ITA), Oļegs Latiševs (LAT) |

| 11 March 2016 10 | Žalgiris (Lithuania) | 75–90 | (Spain) Real Madrid | Kaunas, Lithuania |
| 18:45 (CET) | Scoring by quarter: 17–13, 24–26, 12–23, 22–28 |
| | Pts: Jankūnas 21; Rebs: Jankūnas 8 Asts: Randle 6 PIR: Jankūnas 35 | Boxscore | Pts: Nocioni 22; Rebs: Reyes 8 Asts: Rodríguez 8 PIR: Nocioni 23 | Arena: Žalgirio Arena; Attendance: 12,567; Referees: Damir Javor (SLO), Srđan Dožai (CRO), Tolga Sahin (ITA) |

| 17 March 2016 11 | FC Barcelona Lassa (Spain) | 72–65 | (Spain) Real Madrid | Barcelona, Spain |
| 20:45 (CET) | Scoring by quarter: 25–4, 15–24, 12–23, 20–14 |
| | Pts: Perperoglou 20; Rebs: Dorsey 10; Asts: Satoranský 3 PIR: Satoranský 20 | Boxscore | Pts: Ayón 16; Rebs: Ayón 7 Asts: Rodríguez 6 PIR: Ayón 18 | Arena: Palau Blaugrana; Attendance: 7,142; Referees: Robert Lottermoser (GER), Eddie Viator (FRA), Matej Boltauzer (SLO) |

| 25 March 2016 12 | Olympiacos (Greece) | 99–84 | (Spain) Real Madrid | Piraeus, Greece |
| 20:45 (CET) | Scoring by quarter: 23–17, 30–16, 20–21, 26–30 |
| | Pts: Mantzaris 19; Rebs: Papanikolaou 9 Asts: Spanoulis 6 PIR: Mantzaris, Printezis 19 | Boxscore | Pts: Llull, Rivers 17; Rebs: Ayón 10; Asts: Rivers, Rodríguez 4 PIR: Rivers 21 | Arena: Peace and Friendship Stadium; Attendance: 11,232; Referees: Fernando Rocha (POR), Saša Pukl (SLO), Milija Vojinović (SRB) |

| 1 April 2016 13 | Laboral Kutxa (Spain) | 89–88 | (Spain) Real Madrid | Vitoria-Gasteiz, Spain |
| 20:30 (CEST) | Scoring by quarter: 11–21, 25–25, 31–21, 22–21 |
| | Pts: James 27; Rebs: Bourousis 10; Asts: Adams 5 PIR: Bourousis 35 | Boxscore | Pts: Rodríguez 18; Rebs: Ayón 8 Asts: Llull, Rodríguez 5 PIR: Rodríguez 22 | Arena: Fernando Buesa Arena; Attendance: 13,726; Referees: Ilija Belošević (SRB), Elias Koromilas (GRE), Petri Mäntylä (FIN) |

| 7 April 2016 14 | Real Madrid (Spain) | 83–70 | (Russia) Khimki | Madrid, Spain |
| 20:45 (CEST) | Scoring by quarter: 33–28, 21–21, 12–9, 17–12 |
| | Pts: Carroll 23; Rebs: Reyes 8 Asts: Rodríguez 10; PIR: Reyes 22 | Boxscore | Pts: Rice 24; Rebs: Augustine 7 Asts: Rice 4 PIR: Rice 26 | Arena: Barclaycard Center; Attendance: 11,805; Referees: Christos Christodoulou (GRE), Sreten Radović (CRO), Carmelo Paternico (ITA) |

==== Playoffs ====
Win Loss

| 12 April 2016 1 | Fenerbahçe (Turkey) | 75–69 | (Spain) Real Madrid | Istanbul, Turkey |
| 19:45 (CEST) | Scoring by quarter: 15–11, 26–18, 12–23, 22–17 |
| | Pts: Bogdanović, Sloukas 17; Rebs: Kalinić, Udoh 7 Asts: Bogdanović 5 PIR: Bogdanović 19 | Boxscore | Pts: Reyes 13; Rebs: Ayón 8 Asts: Llull 5 PIR: Llull 16 | Arena: Ülker Sports Arena; Attendance: 12,826; Referees: Damir Javor (SLO), Milivoje Jovčić (SRB), Oļegs Latiševs (LAT) |

| 14 April 2016 2 | Fenerbahçe (Turkey) | 100–78 | (Spain) Real Madrid | Istanbul, Turkey |
| 19:45 (CEST) | Scoring by quarter: 27–14, 27–15, 22–19, 24–30 |
| | Pts: Udoh 18; Rebs: Antić 8 Asts: Sloukas 6 PIR: Udoh 25 | Boxscore | Pts: Rodríguez 15; Rebs: Dončić 6 Asts: Fernández 3 PIR: Dončić, Rodríguez 15 | Arena: Ülker Sports Arena; Attendance: 12,904; Referees: Christos Christodoulou (GRE), Eddie Viator (FRA), Matej Boltauzer (SLO) |

| 19 April 2016 3 | Real Madrid (Spain) | 63–75 | (Turkey) Fenerbahçe | Madrid, Spain |
| 20:45 (CEST) | Scoring by quarter: 13–18, 14–12, 13–24, 23–21 |
| | Pts: Rodríguez 15; Rebs: Ayón 14; Asts: Rodríguez 4 PIR: Rodríguez 18 | Boxscore | Pts: Bogdanović 17; Rebs: Udoh 12; Asts: Sloukas 5 PIR: Udoh 33 | Arena: Barclaycard Center; Attendance: 11,349; Referees: Borys Ryzhyk (UKR), Robert Lottermoser (GER), Spiros Gkontas (GRE) |

=== Copa del Rey ===
Win Loss

| 19 February 2016 Quarterfinals | Real Madrid | 101–84 | Montakit Fuenlabrada | A Coruña |
| 19:00 (CET) | Scoring by quarter: 25–21, 29–13, 23–25, 24–25 |
| | Pts: Carroll 18; Rebs: Ayón 7 Asts: Llull, Rodríguez 6 PIR: Llull 24 | Boxscore | Pts: Paunić 27; Rebs: Paunić 7 Asts: Tabu, Úriz 5 PIR: Paunić 34 | Arena: Coliseum; Attendance: 9,800; Referees: Pérez Pizarro, Perea, Araña |

| 20 February 2016 Semifinals | Laboral Kutxa Baskonia | 80–86 | Real Madrid | A Coruña |
| 21:30 (CET) | 'Scoring by quarter: 17–25, 27–15, 17–20, 19–26 |
| | Pts: Bourousis 16; Rebs: Bourousis 13; Asts: Adams, Hanga 3 PIR: Bourousis 20 | Boxscore | Pts: Llull 15; Rebs: Reyes 9 Asts: Rodríguez 6 PIR: Ayón 18 | Arena: Coliseum; Attendance: 10,000; Referees: Pérez Pizarro, Pérez Pérez, Peruga |

| 21 February 2016 Final | Herbalife Gran Canaria | 81–85 | Real Madrid | A Coruña |
| 19:00 (CET) | Scoring by quarter: 18–24, 20-16, 21–22, 22–23 |
| | Pts: Oliver 16; Rebs: Aguilar 8 Asts: Seeley, Pangos 4 PIR: Oliver 18 | Boxscore | Pts: Ayón 15; Rebs: Nocioni 7 Asts: Rodríguez, Llull 5 PIR: Ayón 21 | Arena: Coliseum; Attendance: 10,000; Referees: Martín Bertrán, García González, Cortés |

== Statistics ==
Legend
| GP | Games played | GS | Games started | MPG | Minutes per game |
| FG% | Field-goal percentage | 3FG% | 3-point field-goal percentage | FT% | Free-throw percentage |
| RPG | Rebounds per game | APG | Assists per game | SPG | Steals per game |
| BPG | Blocks per game | PPG | Points per game | PIR | PIR per game |

=== Liga ACB ===
| Player | GP | GS | MPG | FG% | 3FG% | FT% | RPG | APG | SPG | BPG | PPG | EFF |
|---|---|---|---|---|---|---|---|---|---|---|---|---|
| Gustavo Ayón | 0 | 0 | 0.0 | .000 | .000 | .000 | 0.0 | 0.0 | 0.0 | 0.0 | 0.0 | 0.0 |
| Jaycee Carroll | 0 | 0 | 0.0 | .000 | .000 | .000 | 0.0 | 0.0 | 0.0 | 0.0 | 0.0 | 0.0 |
| Daniel de la Rúa | 0 | 0 | 0.0 | .000 | .000 | .000 | 0.0 | 0.0 | 0.0 | 0.0 | 0.0 | 0.0 |
| Luka Dončić | 0 | 0 | 0.0 | .000 | .000 | .000 | 0.0 | 0.0 | 0.0 | 0.0 | 0.0 | 0.0 |
| Rudy Fernández | 0 | 0 | 0.0 | .000 | .000 | .000 | 0.0 | 0.0 | 0.0 | 0.0 | 0.0 | 0.0 |
| Guillermo Hernangómez | 0 | 0 | 0.0 | .000 | .000 | .000 | 0.0 | 0.0 | 0.0 | 0.0 | 0.0 | 0.0 |
| Augusto Lima | 0 | 0 | 0.0 | .000 | .000 | .000 | 0.0 | 0.0 | 0.0 | 0.0 | 0.0 | 0.0 |
| Sergio Llull | 0 | 0 | 0.0 | .000 | .000 | .000 | 0.0 | 0.0 | 0.0 | 0.0 | 0.0 | 0.0 |
| Jonas Mačiulis | 0 | 0 | 0.0 | .000 | .000 | .000 | 0.0 | 0.0 | 0.0 | 0.0 | 0.0 | 0.0 |
| Maurice Ndour | 0 | 0 | 0.0 | .000 | .000 | .000 | 0.0 | 0.0 | 0.0 | 0.0 | 0.0 | 0.0 |
| Andrés Nocioni | 0 | 0 | 0.0 | .000 | .000 | .000 | 0.0 | 0.0 | 0.0 | 0.0 | 0.0 | 0.0 |
| Dino Radončić | 0 | 0 | 0.0 | .000 | .000 | .000 | 0.0 | 0.0 | 0.0 | 0.0 | 0.0 | 0.0 |
| Felipe Reyes | 0 | 0 | 0.0 | .000 | .000 | .000 | 0.0 | 0.0 | 0.0 | 0.0 | 0.0 | 0.0 |
| K. C. Rivers | 0 | 0 | 0.0 | .000 | .000 | .000 | 0.0 | 0.0 | 0.0 | 0.0 | 0.0 | 0.0 |
| Sergio Rodríguez | 0 | 0 | 0.0 | .000 | .000 | .000 | 0.0 | 0.0 | 0.0 | 0.0 | 0.0 | 0.0 |
| Jeffery Taylor | 0 | 0 | 0.0 | .000 | .000 | .000 | 0.0 | 0.0 | 0.0 | 0.0 | 0.0 | 0.0 |
| Samba Thiago | 0 | 0 | 0.0 | .000 | .000 | .000 | 0.0 | 0.0 | 0.0 | 0.0 | 0.0 | 0.0 |
| Trey Thompkins | 0 | 0 | 0.0 | .000 | .000 | .000 | 0.0 | 0.0 | 0.0 | 0.0 | 0.0 | 0.0 |

Last updated: May 22, 2016.
Source: ACB

=== ACB Playoffs ===
| Player | GP | GS | MPG | FG% | 3FG% | FT% | RPG | APG | SPG | BPG | PPG | EFF |
|---|---|---|---|---|---|---|---|---|---|---|---|---|
| Gustavo Ayón | 0 | 0 | 0.0 | .000 | .000 | .000 | 0.0 | 0.0 | 0.0 | 0.0 | 0.0 | 0.0 |
| Jaycee Carroll | 0 | 0 | 0.0 | .000 | .000 | .000 | 0.0 | 0.0 | 0.0 | 0.0 | 0.0 | 0.0 |
| Luka Dončić | 0 | 0 | 0.0 | .000 | .000 | .000 | 0.0 | 0.0 | 0.0 | 0.0 | 0.0 | 0.0 |
| Rudy Fernández | 0 | 0 | 0.0 | .000 | .000 | .000 | 0.0 | 0.0 | 0.0 | 0.0 | 0.0 | 0.0 |
| Guillermo Hernangómez | 0 | 0 | 0.0 | .000 | .000 | .000 | 0.0 | 0.0 | 0.0 | 0.0 | 0.0 | 0.0 |
| Augusto Lima | 0 | 0 | 0.0 | .000 | .000 | .000 | 0.0 | 0.0 | 0.0 | 0.0 | 0.0 | 0.0 |
| Sergio Llull | 0 | 0 | 0.0 | .000 | .000 | .000 | 0.0 | 0.0 | 0.0 | 0.0 | 0.0 | 0.0 |
| Jonas Mačiulis | 0 | 0 | 0.0 | .000 | .000 | .000 | 0.0 | 0.0 | 0.0 | 0.0 | 0.0 | 0.0 |
| Andrés Nocioni | 0 | 0 | 0.0 | .000 | .000 | .000 | 0.0 | 0.0 | 0.0 | 0.0 | 0.0 | 0.0 |
| Felipe Reyes | 0 | 0 | 0.0 | .000 | .000 | .000 | 0.0 | 0.0 | 0.0 | 0.0 | 0.0 | 0.0 |
| Sergio Rodríguez | 0 | 0 | 0.0 | .000 | .000 | .000 | 0.0 | 0.0 | 0.0 | 0.0 | 0.0 | 0.0 |
| Jeffery Taylor | 0 | 0 | 0.0 | .000 | .000 | .000 | 0.0 | 0.0 | 0.0 | 0.0 | 0.0 | 0.0 |
| Trey Thompkins | 0 | 0 | 0.0 | .000 | .000 | .000 | 0.0 | 0.0 | 0.0 | 0.0 | 0.0 | 0.0 |

Last updated: June 22, 2016.
Source: ACB

=== Copa del Rey ===
| Player | GP | GS | MPG | FG% | 3FG% | FT% | RPG | APG | SPG | BPG | PPG | EFF |
|---|---|---|---|---|---|---|---|---|---|---|---|---|
| Gustavo Ayón | 0 | 0 | 0.0 | .000 | .000 | .000 | 0.0 | 0.0 | 0.0 | 0.0 | 0.0 | 0.0 |
| Jaycee Carroll | 0 | 0 | 0.0 | .000 | .000 | .000 | 0.0 | 0.0 | 0.0 | 0.0 | 0.0 | 0.0 |
| Luka Dončić | 0 | 0 | 0.0 | .000 | .000 | .000 | 0.0 | 0.0 | 0.0 | 0.0 | 0.0 | 0.0 |
| Guillermo Hernangómez | 0 | 0 | 0.0 | .000 | .000 | .000 | 0.0 | 0.0 | 0.0 | 0.0 | 0.0 | 0.0 |
| Augusto Lima | 0 | 0 | 0.0 | .000 | .000 | .000 | 0.0 | 0.0 | 0.0 | 0.0 | 0.0 | 0.0 |
| Sergio Llull | 0 | 0 | 0.0 | .000 | .000 | .000 | 0.0 | 0.0 | 0.0 | 0.0 | 0.0 | 0.0 |
| Jonas Mačiulis | 0 | 0 | 0.0 | .000 | .000 | .000 | 0.0 | 0.0 | 0.0 | 0.0 | 0.0 | 0.0 |
| Andrés Nocioni | 0 | 0 | 0.0 | .000 | .000 | .000 | 0.0 | 0.0 | 0.0 | 0.0 | 0.0 | 0.0 |
| Felipe Reyes | 0 | 0 | 0.0 | .000 | .000 | .000 | 0.0 | 0.0 | 0.0 | 0.0 | 0.0 | 0.0 |
| K. C. Rivers | 0 | 0 | 0.0 | .000 | .000 | .000 | 0.0 | 0.0 | 0.0 | 0.0 | 0.0 | 0.0 |
| Sergio Rodríguez | 0 | 0 | 0.0 | .000 | .000 | .000 | 0.0 | 0.0 | 0.0 | 0.0 | 0.0 | 0.0 |
| Jeffery Taylor | 0 | 0 | 0.0 | .000 | .000 | .000 | 0.0 | 0.0 | 0.0 | 0.0 | 0.0 | 0.0 |

Last updated: February 21, 2016.
Source: ACB

=== Supercopa de España ===
| Player | GP | GS | MPG | FG% | 3FG% | FT% | RPG | APG | SPG | BPG | PPG | EFF |
|---|---|---|---|---|---|---|---|---|---|---|---|---|
| Gustavo Ayón | 1 | 1 | 22.0 | .500 | .000 | .000 | 4.0 | 1.0 | 1.0 | 0.0 | 4.0 | 4.0 |
| Jaycee Carroll | 1 | 1 | 29.0 | .444 | .333 | 1.000 | 2.0 | 2.0 | 0.0 | 0.0 | 16.0 | 16.0 |
| Luka Dončić | 1 | 0 | 14.0 | .000 | .000 | .000 | 0.0 | 0.0 | 0.0 | 0.0 | 0.0 | 0.0 |
| Guillermo Hernangómez | 1 | 0 | 12.0 | .000 | .000 | 1.000 | 1.0 | 0.0 | 0.0 | 0.0 | 2.0 | 0.0 |
| Sergio Llull | 1 | 1 | 27.0 | .300 | .143 | .500 | 1.0 | 3.0 | 0.0 | 0.0 | 8.0 | 3.0 |
| Jonas Mačiulis | 1 | 1 | 18.0 | .400 | .000 | .000 | 3.0 | 1.0 | 2.0 | 0.0 | 4.0 | 7.0 |
| Andrés Nocioni | 1 | 0 | 10.0 | .000 | .000 | .000 | 1.0 | 1.0 | 0.0 | 1.0 | 0.0 | 0.0 |
| Dino Radončić | 0 | 0 | 0.0 | .000 | .000 | .000 | 0.0 | 0.0 | 0.0 | 0.0 | 0.0 | 0.0 |
| Felipe Reyes | 1 | 1 | 25.0 | .636 | 1.000 | .500 | 10.0 | 2.0 | 1.0 | 0.0 | 18.0 | 25.0 |
| Sergio Rodríguez | 1 | 0 | 28.0 | .500 | .400 | .000 | 2.0 | 4.0 | 0.0 | 0.0 | 16.0 | 12.0 |
| Trey Thompkins | 1 | 0 | 14.0 | .250 | .000 | .000 | 2.0 | 0.0 | 0.0 | 0.0 | 2.0 | 0.0 |

Last updated: October 2, 2015.
Source: ACB

=== Euroleague ===
| Player | GP | GS | MPG | FG% | 3FG% | FT% | RPG | APG | SPG | BPG | PPG | EFF |
|---|---|---|---|---|---|---|---|---|---|---|---|---|
| Gustavo Ayón | 0 | 0 | 0.0 | .000 | .000 | .000 | 0.0 | 0.0 | 0.0 | 0.0 | 0.0 | 0.0 |
| Jaycee Carroll | 0 | 0 | 0.0 | .000 | .000 | .000 | 0.0 | 0.0 | 0.0 | 0.0 | 0.0 | 0.0 |
| Luka Dončić | 0 | 0 | 0.0 | .000 | .000 | .000 | 0.0 | 0.0 | 0.0 | 0.0 | 0.0 | 0.0 |
| Rudy Fernández | 0 | 0 | 0.0 | .000 | .000 | .000 | 0.0 | 0.0 | 0.0 | 0.0 | 0.0 | 0.0 |
| Guillermo Hernangómez | 0 | 0 | 0.0 | .000 | .000 | .000 | 0.0 | 0.0 | 0.0 | 0.0 | 0.0 | 0.0 |
| Augusto Lima | 0 | 0 | 0.0 | .000 | .000 | .000 | 0.0 | 0.0 | 0.0 | 0.0 | 0.0 | 0.0 |
| Sergio Llull | 0 | 0 | 0.0 | .000 | .000 | .000 | 0.0 | 0.0 | 0.0 | 0.0 | 0.0 | 0.0 |
| Jonas Mačiulis | 0 | 0 | 0.0 | .000 | .000 | .000 | 0.0 | 0.0 | 0.0 | 0.0 | 0.0 | 0.0 |
| Maurice Ndour | 0 | 0 | 0.0 | .000 | .000 | .000 | 0.0 | 0.0 | 0.0 | 0.0 | 0.0 | 0.0 |
| Andrés Nocioni | 0 | 0 | 0.0 | .000 | .000 | .000 | 0.0 | 0.0 | 0.0 | 0.0 | 0.0 | 0.0 |
| Dino Radončić | 0 | 0 | 0.0 | .000 | .000 | .000 | 0.0 | 0.0 | 0.0 | 0.0 | 0.0 | 0.0 |
| Felipe Reyes | 0 | 0 | 0.0 | .000 | .000 | .000 | 0.0 | 0.0 | 0.0 | 0.0 | 0.0 | 0.0 |
| K. C. Rivers | 0 | 0 | 0.0 | .000 | .000 | .000 | 0.0 | 0.0 | 0.0 | 0.0 | 0.0 | 0.0 |
| Sergio Rodríguez | 0 | 0 | 0.0 | .000 | .000 | .000 | 0.0 | 0.0 | 0.0 | 0.0 | 0.0 | 0.0 |
| Jeffery Taylor | 0 | 0 | 0.0 | .000 | .000 | .000 | 0.0 | 0.0 | 0.0 | 0.0 | 0.0 | 0.0 |
| Trey Thompkins | 0 | 0 | 0.0 | .000 | .000 | .000 | 0.0 | 0.0 | 0.0 | 0.0 | 0.0 | 0.0 |

Last updated: April 19, 2016.
Source: Euroleague

=== Intercontinental Cup ===
| Player | GP | MPG | FG% | 3FG% | FT% | RPG | APG | SPG | BPG | PPG |
|---|---|---|---|---|---|---|---|---|---|---|
| Gustavo Ayón | 2 | 28.0 | .625 | .000 | .750 | 8.5 | 0.0 | 1.5 | 0.5 | 6.5 |
| Jaycee Carroll | 2 | 28.0 | .600 | .500 | .916 | 3.5 | 0.0 | 1.5 | 0.5 | 20.0 |
| Luka Dončić | 2 | 12.0 | .000 | .000 | .666 | 1.0 | 1.5 | 1.5 | 0.5 | 2.0 |
| Rudy Fernández | 1 | 19.0 | .500 | .666 | .000 | 6.0 | 3.0 | 0.0 | 1.0 | 8.0 |
| Guillermo Hernangómez | 2 | 7.0 | 1.000 | .000 | .000 | 1.0 | 0.0 | 0.0 | 0.5 | 2.0 |
| Sergio Llull | 2 | 32.0 | .448 | .429 | .857 | 4.5 | 6.0 | 1.0 | 0.0 | 19.0 |
| Jonas Mačiulis | 2 | 18.0 | 1.000 | .000 | 1.000 | 2.0 | 0.5 | 0.0 | 0.0 | 1.5 |
| Andrés Nocioni | 2 | 13.0 | .308 | .286 | .750 | 3.5 | 0.5 | 0.5 | 0.0 | 6.5 |
| Felipe Reyes | 2 | 15.0 | .364 | .000 | .500 | 5.5 | 0.5 | 0.0 | 0.5 | 6.5 |
| Sergio Rodríguez | 2 | 14.0 | .444 | .333 | .875 | 1.5 | 1.0 | 1.0 | 0.0 | 8.0 |
| Jeffery Taylor | 0 | 0.0 | .000 | .000 | .000 | 0.0 | 0.0 | 0.0 | 0.0 | 0.0 |
| Trey Thompkins | 2 | 21.0 | .800 | .800 | 1.000 | 1.5 | 1.0 | 0.0 | 0.0 | 14.5 |

Last updated: September 27, 2015.
Source: FIBA Americas
