= 2010–11 Euroleague Top 16 Group E =

Standings and Results for Group E of the Top 16 phase of the 2010–11 Euroleague basketball tournament.

== Standings ==
Key to colors
| Top two places in each group advance to Quarterfinals |

| | Team | Pld | W | L | PF | PA | Diff | Tie-break |
|---|---|---|---|---|---|---|---|---|
| 1. | (Spain) Caja Laboral | 6 | 4 | 2 | 468 | 437 | +31 | 1−1 +5 |
| 2. | (Greece) Panathinaikos | 6 | 4 | 2 | 452 | 395 | +57 | 1−1 −5 |
| 3. | (Lithuania) Lietuvos Rytas | 6 | 3 | 3 | 445 | 473 | −28 | |
| 4. | (Spain) Unicaja Málaga | 6 | 1 | 5 | 414 | 474 | −60 | |

== Fixtures and results ==
All times given below are in Central European Time.

Unless otherwise indicated, all attendance totals are from the corresponding match report posted on the official Euroleague site and included with each game summary.

=== Game 1 ===
19 January 2011
19:45

Report

| Lietuvos Rytas (Lithuania) | 59–80 | (Greece) Panathinaikos |
Scoring by quarter: 21–18, 12–11, 8–24, 18–27
| Pts: Bjelica 11; Rebs: Bjelica 8 Asts: three players 3 | | Pts: Batiste 26; Rebs: Kaimakoglou 9 Asts: Diamantidis 6 |

Siemens Arena, Vilnius
Attendance: 9,500
Referees: Luigi Lamonica (ITA), Sasa Pukl (SLO), Tolga Sahin (ITA)

20 January 2011
20:45

Report

| Unicaja Málaga (Spain) | 71–76 | (Spain) Caja Laboral |
Scoring by quarter: 19–21, 16–20, 18–17, 18–18
| Pts: Freeland 16; Rebs: Jiménez, Freeland 7 Asts: Blakney 4 | | Pts: Huertas 19; Rebs: Batista 14; Asts: Huertas, Batista 4 |

Jose Maria Martin Carpena Arena, Málaga
Attendance: 9,700
Referees: Grzegorz Ziemblicki (POL), Spiros Gkontas (GRE), David Chambon (FRA)

=== Game 2 ===
26 January 2011
20:45

Report

| Caja Laboral (Spain) | 86–89 | (Lithuania) Lietuvos Rytas |
Scoring by quarter: 17–26, 23–11, 16–18, 30–34
| Pts: Teletović 20; Rebs: San Emeterio 8 Asts: Huertas 11 | | Pts: El-Amin 22; Rebs: Valančiūnas 7 Asts: Strawberry, Newley 3 |

Fernando Buesa Arena, Vitoria-Gasteiz
Attendance: 9,100
Referees: Zoran Sutulovic (MNE), Borys Ryzhyk (UKR), Luis Lopes (POR)

27 January 2011
19:45

Report

| Panathinaikos (Greece) | 82–56 | (Spain) Unicaja Málaga |
Scoring by quarter: 26–13, 19–12, 23–14, 14–17
| Pts: Tsartsaris 14; Rebs: Tsartsaris 8 Asts: Diamantidis 6 | | Pts: Freeland 11; Rebs: Rubio 6 Asts: Rodríguez, Freire 3 |

Olympic Indoor Hall, Athens
Attendance: 6,000
Referees: Fabio Facchini (ITA), Sradan Dozai (CRO), Robert Vyklicky (CZE)

=== Game 3 ===
3 February 2011
20:30

Report

| Caja Laboral (Spain) | 77–70 | (Greece) Panathinaikos |
Scoring by quarter: 19–18, 17–15, 23–16, 18–21
| Pts: San Emeterio 21; Rebs: Batista 5 Asts: San Emeterio 4 | | Pts: Nicholas 15; Rebs: Fotsis 7 Asts: Diamantidis 11 |

Fernando Buesa Arena, Vitoria-Gasteiz
Attendance: 9,650
Referees: Carlo Jungebrand (FIN), Matej Boltauzer (SLO), Olegs Latisevs (LAT)

3 February 2011
20:45

Report

| Unicaja Málaga (Spain) | 98–91 | (Lithuania) Lietuvos Rytas |
Scoring by quarter: 18–23, 27–29, 17–18, 36–21
| Pts: Tripković, Sinanović 15; Rebs: Sinanović 8 Asts: Rodríguez 6 | | Pts: El-Amin 14; Rebs: Valančiūnas 7 Asts: El-Amin 8 |

Jose Maria Martin Carpena Arena, Málaga
Attendance: 7,000
Referees: Ilija Belosevic (SRB), Eddie Viator (FRA), Panagiotis Anastopoulos (GRE)

=== Game 4 ===
17 February 2011
19:45

Report

| Panathinaikos (Greece) | 76–74 | (Spain) Caja Laboral |
Scoring by quarter: 21–18, 19–21, 19–11, 17–24
| Pts: Fotsis 22; Rebs: Fotsis 11; Asts: Diamantidis 5 | | Pts: Logan 21; Rebs: Batista 8 Asts: Oleson 3 |

Olympic Indoor Hall, Athens
Attendance: 11,000
Referees: Guerrino Cerebuch (ITA), Eddie Viator (FRA), Milia Vojinovic (SRB)

17 February 2011
19:45

Report

| Lietuvos Rytas (Lithuania) | 70–65 | (Spain) Unicaja Málaga |
Scoring by quarter: 17–17, 22–18, 14–13, 17–17
| Pts: El-Amin 18; Rebs: Bjelica, Gecevičius 6 Asts: Strawberry, Jomantas 3 | | Pts: Freeland 19; Rebs: Freeland, Archibald 8 Asts: Blakney 6 |

Siemens Arena, Vilnius
Attendance: 8,800
Referees: Volodymr Drabikovsky (UKR), Recep Ankarali(TUR), Radomir Vojinovic (MNE)

=== Game 5 ===
23 February 2011
18:00

Report

| Panathinaikos (Greece) | 67–68 | (Lithuania) Lietuvos Rytas |
Scoring by quarter: 20–23, 19–11, 14–14, 14–20
| Pts: Batiste 11; Rebs: Batiste 4 Asts: Diamantidis 7 | | Pts: Newley 16; Rebs: Valančiūnas 7 Asts: El-Amin 4 |

Olympic Indoor Hall, Athens
Attendance: 4,600
Referees: Dani Hierrezuelo (ESP), Milivoje Jovcic (SRB), Roberto Chiari (ITA)

24 February 2011
20:30

Report

| Caja Laboral (Spain) | 78–63 | (Spain) Unicaja Málaga |
Scoring by quarter: 24–14, 16–17, 18–18, 20–14
| Pts: Huertas 18; Rebs: Barać 8 Asts: Huertas 5 | | Pts: Sinanović 18; Rebs: Freeland 8 Asts: Rodríguez 3 |

Fernando Buesa Arena, Vitoria-Gasteiz
Attendance: 9,250
Referees: Fernando Rocha (POR), Marek Cmikiewicz (POL), Tolga Sahin (ITA)

=== Game 6 ===
3 March 2011
20:45

Report

| Lietuvos Rytas (Lithuania) | 68–77 | (Spain) Caja Laboral |
Scoring by quarter: 16–27, 23–13, 16–18, 13–19
| Pts: Bajramović 14; Rebs: Valančiūnas 11; Asts: three players 4 | | Pts: San Emeterio 19; Rebs: San Emeterio 12; Asts: Huertas 5 |

Siemens Arena, Vilnius
Attendance: 11,000
Referees: Luigi Lamonica (ITA), Christos Christodoulou (GRE), Jakub Zamojski (POL)

3 March 2011
20:45

Report

| Unicaja Málaga (Spain) | 61–77 | (Greece) Panathinaikos |
Scoring by quarter: 18–23, 15–15, 8–15, 20–24
| Pts: three players 12; Rebs: Sinanović 8 Asts: McIntyre, Fitch 3 | | Pts: Nicholas 18; Rebs: Diamantidis 8 Asts: Nicholas, Diamantidis 3 |

Jose Maria Martin Carpena Arena, Málaga
Attendance: 5,700
Referees: Sasa Pukl (SLO), Paolo Taurino (ITA), Robert Lottermoser (GER)
