= Bàsquet Mallorca =

- Founded: 2008
- Dissolved: 2013
- Arena: Palau Municipal (capacity: 3,000)
- Location: Inca, Spain, Balearic Islands
- Team colors: Orange and Black
- President: (Spain) Antoni Ramis
- Head coach: (Spain) Xavi Sastre
- Website: www.basquetmallorca.com
Home	Away

Club Bàsquet Mallorquí, also known as Bàsquet Mallorca, was a professional basketball team based in Inca, Balearic Islands, Spain.

== History ==
Bàsquet Mallorca was founded in 2008 as a merger of two teams from Balearic Islands:

- Club Bàsquet Inca (former LEB Oro team)
- Club Bàsquet Muro (former LEB Plata team)

The team started playing in LEB Oro, but in the summer of 2010 they were relegated to LEB Plata because of not submitting all documentation on time. In that 2010–11 season, Mallorca promoted to LEB Oro after winning the final playoffs to BC Andorra. In the last game, Mallorca won 67–66 after Andreu Matalí failed two free shots with only one second left.

In 2012, the club resigned to play any competition and announced it would be probably dissolved, but in September 2012 the Spanish Basketball Federation finally invited it to join Liga EBA.

At the end of the season, Bàsquet Mallorca was dissolved and two new clubs appeared in Inca to substitute it: Former LEB Oro team Bàsquet Inca was re-founded and the youth system separated from the main club to create the new Bàsquet Ciutat d'Inca.

== Sponsorship naming ==
Bàsquet Mallorca had denominations through the years due to its sponsorship:

- Iberostar Mallorca Bàsquet: 2011 (only during LEB Plata promotion playoffs)
- Logitravel Básquet Mallorca: 2011–12
- WifiBaleares Mallorca Bàsquet: 2012–2013

== Season by season ==
Season	Tier	Division	Pos.	W–L
2008–09	2	LEB Oro	15th	12–22
2009–10	2	LEB Oro	12th (Note: Did not play in LEB Oro due to administrative problems. Grupo Iruña Navarra occupied its berth.)	16–18
2010–11	3	LEB Plata	2nd	31–11
2011–12	2	LEB Oro	13th (Note: Resigned to its berth in LEB Oro and joined the Group C of Liga EBA.)	15–19
2012–13	4	Liga EBA	13th	12–18

== Notable past players ==
- (Portugal) Sérgio Ramos
- (United States) / (Germany) Cody Töpper
- (Fiji) Marques Whippy
- (Greece) Sotiris Manolopoulos

== See also ==
- CB Inca
