= Tenerife CB =

Tenerife Baloncesto
- Leagues: LEB Plata
- Founded: 1996
- Dissolved: 2013
- Arena: Pabellón Municipal de Santa Cruz
- Location: San Cristóbal de La Laguna; 1996–2011; Santa Cruz de Tenerife; 2011–2012; Tegueste (2012–2013)
- Team colors: Navy and white
- President: José Miguel Martín
- Championships: 1 Copa Príncipe
Home	Away

Tenerife Club de Baloncesto was a professional basketball team based in Tenerife, Canary Islands, Spain.

== History ==
Tenerife CB was founded in 1996 after the fusion of some teams of the islands and debuts in LEB Oro in the 1996–97 season, the first of this league.

In the 2002–03 season, Tenerife plays the FIBA Champions' Cup and reaches the second stage. In the same year, Tenerife CB becomes champion of the Copa Príncipe and promotes to Liga ACB, where it plays two seasons before being relegated to LEB Oro.

In summer of 2010, Tenerife CB renounces to its berth in LEB Oro due to financial problems and is relegated to Liga EBA. In the next summer and after reaching the promotion playoffs, Tenerife CB achieved a vacant berth to play in LEB Plata, the Spanish basketball third division.

In 2013, the club was not allowed to play the lowest regional category in the Canary Islands.

== Season by season ==
Season	Tier	Division	Pos.	W–L	Cup competitions		European competitions		
1996–97	2	LEB	13th	10–20					
1997–98	2	LEB	4th	15–19					
1998–99	2	LEB	6th	18–12	Copa Príncipe	SF			
1999–00	2	LEB	6th	24–16	Copa Príncipe	RU			
2000–01	2	LEB	11th	12–18					
2001–02	2	LEB	4th	25–15	Copa Príncipe	RU			
2002–03	2	LEB	2nd	30–9	Copa Príncipe	C	4 FIBA Champions' Cup	GS	12–4
2003–04	1	Liga ACB	10th	16–18					
2004–05	1	Liga ACB	17th	8–26					
2005–06	2	LEB	13th	15–19					
2006–07	2	LEB	14th	14–20					
2007–08	2	LEB Oro	3rd	22–17					
2008–09	2	LEB Oro	4th	23–14					
2009–10	2	LEB Oro	11th (Note: Resigned to its berth in LEB Oro.)	16–18					
2010–11	4	Liga EBA	1st (Note: Achieved one of the vacant berths in LEB Plata.)	23–9					
2011–12	3	LEB Plata	12th (Note: Resigned to its berth in LEB Plata.)	7–17					
2012–13	5	1ª División	2nd	14–2					

== Trophies and awards ==
=== Trophies ===
- Copa Príncipe: (1)
  - 2003
- Trofeo Gobierno de Canarias: (2)
  - 2002, 2005

=== Individual awards ===
LEB Oro MVP

- Lawrence Lewis – 2002

== Notable players ==
- (Argentina) Jorge Racca 1 season: '04-'05
- (Spain) José Ángel Antelo 1 season: '08-'09
- (Spain) Nacho Yáñez 2 seasons: '02-'04
- (Spain) Richi Guillén 1 season: '03-'04
- (Lebanon) Antwain Barbour 3 seasons: '06-'09
- (Libya) Alpha Bangura 1 season: '05-'06
- (Mexico) Gustavo Ayón 1 season: '09-'10
- (Senegal) Sitapha Savané 3 seasons: '01-'04
- (Sweden) Christian Maråker 1 season: '08-'09
- (Trinidad and Tobago) Gimel Lewis 1 season: '07-'08
- (United States) Ashraf Amaya 1 season: '04
- (United States) Bernard Hopkins 2 seasons: '03-'05
- (United States) Chris Alexander 1 season: '07-'08
- (United States) Kenny Miller 1 season: '02-'03
- (United States) Lou Roe 1 season: '09-'10
- (United States) Venson Hamilton 1 season: '02-'03
