= Ciudad de Vigo Básquet =

Spanish basketball team

KICS Ciudad de Vigo
- Founded: 2004
- Dissolved: 2010
- Arena: As Traversas (capacity: 3,500)
- Location: Vigo, Galicia, Spain
- Team colors: red, white
- President: Juan Manuel Vieites
- Head coach: Manolo Povea
- Championships: 1 LEB Bronce Championship
- Website: ciudaddevigobasquet.com
Home	Away

Ciudad de Vigo Básquet, more commonly referred to today by its sponsorship name of KICS Ciudad de Vigo, was a professional Basketball team based in Vigo, Galicia. After the 2009–10 season, the team was dissolved.

== Former names ==
- Gestibérica Ciudad de Vigo (—2009)
- Kics Ciudad de Vigo (2009–10)

== Season by season ==
Season	Tier	Division	Pos.	W–L	Cup competitions	
2006–07	3	LEB 2	17th	13–25		
2007–08	4	LEB Bronce	1st	23–9	Copa LEB Bronce	SF
2008–09	3	LEB Plata	7th (Note: Achieved a vacant berth in LEB Oro.)	18–15		
2009–10	2	LEB Oro	18th	6–28		

== Trophies and awards ==
=== Trophies ===
- LEB Bronce: (1)
  - 2008

== Notable players ==
- (United States) Robert Traylor
- (Greece) Sotiris Manolopoulos
