= Sotirios Manolopoulos =

Greek Cypriot basketball player

Mykonos
- Position: Team Manager
- League: Greek Basketball League

Personal information
- Born: November 16, 1987 (age 38) Thessaloniki, Greece
- Listed height: 6 ft 10 in (2.08 m)
- Listed weight: 225 lb (102 kg)

Career information
- NBA draft: 2009: undrafted
- Playing career: 2003–2023

Career history
- 2003–2007: PAOK Thessaloniki
- 2007–2008: Bàsquet Mallorca
- 2008: →Palencia Baloncesto
- 2008: AEL 1964
- 2008–2009: Gestibérica Vigo
- 2009–2011: Kolossos Rodou
- 2011–2012: Peristeri
- 2012–2013: Kavala
- 2013–2014: Ikaros Chalkidas
- 2014: Aris Thessaloniki
- 2014–2016: Kolossos Rodou
- 2016–2017: Aries Trikala
- 2017–2018: Kymis
- 2018–2019: Ifaistos Limnou
- 2019–2020: Iraklis Thessaloniki
- 2020–2021: Diagoras Rodou
- 2021–2023: AEK Larnaca

Career highlights
- 2x Cypriot Cup winner (2021, 2023)

Sotirios Manolopoulos (alternate spelling: Sotiris) (Greek: Σωτήρης Μανωλόπουλος; born November 16, 1987) is a Greek Cypriot former professional basketball player. He is 2.08 m (6 ft 10 in) tall. He plays at the power forward position.

== Professional career ==
Some of the clubs that Manolopoulos has played with during his pro career include: PAOK, Bàsquet Mallorca, Palencia Baloncesto, AEL 1964, Gestibérica Vigo, Kolossos, Peristeri, Kavala, Ikaros and Aris. He rejoined Kolossos Rodou in 2014.

On June 18, 2017, he moved to Kymis of the Greek Basket League, where he eventually became the team captain.

== National team career ==
Manolopoulos played at the 2003 FIBA Europe Under-16 Championship, and at the 2005 FIBA Europe Under-18 Championship, with the junior national teams of Greece.
