= CB Axarquía =

Basketball team in Andalusia, Spain

CB Axarquía / Clinicas Rincón
- Leagues: LEB Plata
- Founded: 1988
- Dissolved: 2016
- Location: Vélez-Málaga (1988–2007); Rincón de la Victoria (2007–2010); Torre del Mar (2010–2011); Benahavís (2011–2012); Málaga (2012–2015); Torremolinos (2015–2016)
- Team colors: White and forest green
- Website: cbclinicasrincon.com
Home	Away

Club Baloncesto Axarquía, more known by its sponsorship name of Clinicas Rincón Axarquía, was a basketball team based in Málaga, Andalusia.

== History ==
Until the 2000s, Axarquía played in Regional leagues and in Liga EBA. In 2005 the team achieved a vacant berth in LEB 2 and started its collaboration as the farm team of Unicaja. Since 2011, the club started playing its games out of the comarca of Axarquía.

In July 2013, when Unicaja was going to resign to continue with its reserve team in LEB Plata, a local entrepreneur rescued CB Axarquía and achieved a vacant berth in LEB Oro. Axarquía agreed also new collaboration terms with Unicaja and now is playing again as farm team.

In March 2015 it was announced CB Axarquía would leave the professional leagues at the end of the season and would restart its project at Liga EBA, but finally the club accepted to play in LEB Plata.

One year later, CB Axarquía would be dissolved due to the lack of support. Manolo Rincón, president and sponsor of the club, accepted the proposal of Unicaja Málaga to sponsor all the youth teams of the club.

== Season by season ==
Season	Tier	Division	Pos.	W–L
2002–03	4	Liga EBA	13th	14–16
2003–04	4	Liga EBA	3rd	19–13
2004–05	4	Liga EBA	4th (Note: Achieved a vacant berth in LEB 2).	20–10
2005–06	3	LEB 2	12th	12–18
2006–07	3	LEB 2	14th	14–20
2007–08	3	LEB Plata	4th (Note: Achieved a vacant berth in LEB Oro.)	26–12
2008–09	2	LEB Oro	7th	19–17
2009–10	2	LEB Oro	14th	13–21
2010–11	2	LEB Oro	14th	12–22
2011–12	2	LEB Oro	17th	7–30
2012–13	3	LEB Plata	3rd (Note: Achieved a vacant berth in LEB Oro.)	18–13
2013–14	2	LEB Oro	9th	11–17
2014–15	2	LEB Oro	14th (Note: Resigned to continue playing in LEB Oro.)	9–19
2015–16	3	LEB Plata	5th	15–19

== Notable players ==
- (Spain) Álex Abrines
- (Spain) Ricardo Guillén
- (Bosnia and Herzegovina) Nedžad Sinanović
- (Brazil) Vítor Faverani
- (Brazil) Augusto Lima
- (Brazil) Paulão Prestes
- (Brazil) Rafa Luz
- (Lithuania) Domantas Sabonis
- (Lithuania) Tautvydas Sabonis
- (Lithuania) Vilmantas Dilys
- (North Macedonia) Andrej Magdevski
- (Serbia) Ognjen Kuzmić
