= Regional basketball competitions in Spain =

The Regional basketball competitions in Spain are competitions usually played in summer with the best teams in each Autonomous Communities.

== Aragon ==
The Trofeo Gobierno de Aragón is played between the two representative teams in the Autonomous Community: Zaragoza and Peñas Huesca.

Year	Host	Winner	Runner-up	Score
2009	Huesca	Zaragoza	Peñas Huesca	83–79
2010	Huesca	Zaragoza	Peñas Huesca	114–81
2013	Huesca	Zaragoza	Peñas Huesca	61–51
2014	Cuarte de Huerva	Zaragoza	Peñas Huesca	88–55
2015	Alagón	Zaragoza	Peñas Huesca	109–74
2017	Huesca	Zaragoza	Peñas Huesca	87–82
2018	Utebo	Zaragoza	Peñas Huesca	81–66
2019	Puebla de Alfindén	Zaragoza	Peñas Huesca	101–62

== Canary Islands ==
=== Trofeo Gobierno de Canarias ===
This trophy was played between all the teams in National competitions from the Canary Islands. It was organized by the Regional Government and was contested between 2004 and 2011.

Year	Host	Winner	Runner-up	Score
2002	La Laguna	Tenerife CB	CB Gran Canaria	83–75
2005	Santa Lucía	Tenerife CB	CB Gran Canaria	83–69
2006	Las Palmas	CB Gran Canaria	CB 1939 Canarias	100–88
2007	Santa Lucía	CB Gran Canaria	Tenerife CB	90–84
2008	Teror	CB Gran Canaria	Tenerife CB	89–80
2009	Santa Lucía	CB 1939 Canarias	CB Gran Canaria	75–66
2010	La Laguna	CB Gran Canaria	UB La Palma	89–54
2011	La Palma	CB 1939 Canarias	CB Gran Canaria	75–63

==== Performance by club ====
Team	Winners	Runners-up	Winning years
CB Gran Canaria	4	4	2006, 2007, 2008, 2010
Tenerife CB	2	2	2002, 2005
CB 1939 Canarias	2	1	2009, 2011
UB La Palma	0	1	

=== Copa Toyota ===
The Copa Toyota is a tournament played only by the two top teams in the Canary Islands in a double-leg round, usually when both are in the Liga ACB. Gran Canaria won all the editions.

Year	Champion	Runner-up	1st leg	2nd leg
2003	CB Gran Canaria	Tenerife CB	76–71	84–61
2004	CB Gran Canaria	Tenerife CB	71–76	58–68
2005	CB Gran Canaria	Tenerife CB	75–73	76–43
2006	CB Gran Canaria	Tenerife CB	69–53	79–64
2007	CB Gran Canaria	Tenerife CB	82–81	87–77
2012	CB Gran Canaria	CB 1939 Canarias	85–78	80–85
2013	CB Gran Canaria	CB 1939 Canarias	67–65	96–81

== Castile-La Mancha ==
The Trofeo Junta de Comunidades was a tournament played by the teams of Castile-La Mancha until 2010. The tournament was organized by the Regional Government.

Year	Final host	Winner	Runner-up	Score
2003		CB Guadalajara		
2004		CB Guadalajara	ADB Hellín	
2005		CB Guadalajara	ADB Hellín	
2006		CDB Ciudad Real	CABA	
2007	Miguel Esteban	CB Illescas	Fundación Adepal	75–61
2008	Alcázar de San Juan	CB Illescas	Fundación Adepal	75–74
2009	Alcázar de San Juan	CB Illescas	Fundación Adepal	71–66
2010	Alcázar de San Juan	Fundación Adepal	CB Illescas	98–75

== Extremadura ==
The Copa Extremadura was a basketball competition between the best teams of Extremadura. It was organized by the Basketball Federation of Extremadura from 2001 to 2011. CB Plasencia is the team with more titles.

The competition came back in 2014 with a three-team format of semifinal and final.

Year	Host	Winner	Runner-up	Score
2001	Almendralejo	Cáceres CB	Círculo Badajoz	80–69
2002	Almendralejo	CB Plasencia	Cáceres CB	85–76
2003	Villanueva	CB Plasencia	Cáceres CB	
2004	Plasencia	CB Plasencia	Cáceres CB	84–55
2005	Villafranca	CB Plasencia	FBS Badajoz	91–56
2006	Plasencia	CB Plasencia	FBS Badajoz	77–75
2007	Mérida	CB Plasencia	Cáceres CdB	86–83
2008	Cáceres	Cáceres CdB	CB Plasencia	84–75
2009	Villanueva	CB Plasencia	Cáceres CdB	86–73
2010	Cáceres	CB Plasencia	Cáceres CdB	73–71
2011	Plasencia	Cáceres CdB	CB Plasencia	71–67
2014	Don Benito	Cáceres CdB	CB Plasencia	75–51

=== Performance by club ===
Team	Winners	Runners-up	Winning years
CB Plasencia	8	2	2002, 2003, 2004, 2005, 2006, 2007, 2009, 2010
Cáceres CdB	3	3	2008, 2011, 2014
Cáceres CB	1	3	2001
FBS Badajoz	0	2	
Círculo Badajoz	0	1	

== Valencian Community ==
The Lliga Valenciana (in English, Valencian League) was a basketball competition between the best teams of the Valencian Community. It was organized by the Valencian Community Basketball Federation from 2004 to 2011. CB Lucentum Alicante is the last winner of the Cup.

Year	Host	Winner	Runner-up	Score	MVP
2004	Alboraya	CB Lucentum	Valencia BC	97–81	
2005	Alicante	Valencia BC	CB Lucentum	78–73	
2006	Alzira	CB Lucentum	Valencia BC	89–85	(United States) Quincy Lewis
2007	Aspe	Valencia BC	Gandía BA	100–88	
2008	Elda	Valencia BC	CB Lucentum	72–60	
2009	Godella	Valencia BC	CB Lucentum	84–76	
2010	L'Alfàs del Pi	Valencia BC	CB Lucentum	72–66	(France) Nando de Colo
2011	La Nucía	CB Lucentum	Valencia BC	78–67	(Spain) Pedro Llompart

=== Performance by club ===
Team	Winners	Runners-up	Winning years
Valencia BC	5	3	2005, 2007, 2008, 2009, 2010
CB Lucentum	3	4	2004, 2006, 2011
Gandía BA	0	1	
