= Jakim Donaldson =

American basketball player (born 1983)

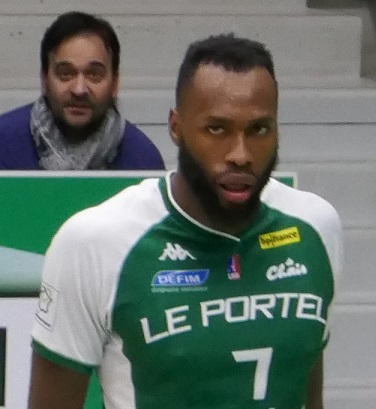
- Donaldson with ESSM Le Portel in February 2018

Free Agent
- Position: Power forward / center

Personal information
- Born: September 3, 1983 (age 43) Pittsburgh, Pennsylvania
- Listed height: 2.04 m (6 ft 8 in)
- Listed weight: 240 lb (109 kg)

Career information
- High school: Oliver (Pittsburgh, Pennsylvania)
- College: Edinboro (2001–2005)
- NBA draft: 2005: undrafted
- Playing career: 2005–present

Career history
- 2005–2006: Barreirense
- 2006–2010: Canarias
- 2010–2011: Menorca
- 2011–2013: Canarias
- 2013–2014: Bnei Herzliya
- 2014–2018: ESSM Le Portel
- 2018–2019: Hapoel Be'er Sheva
- 2019–2021: Bnei Herzliya

Career highlights
- LNB All-Star (2017); 3× LEB Oro MVP (2009, 2010, 2012)

Jakim Nestekaya Donaldson (born September 3, 1983), nicknamed "The Machine", is an American professional basketball player, who lastly played for Bnei Herzliya of the Israeli Basketball Premier League. He played college basketball for Edinboro University of Pennsylvania before playing professionally in Portugal, Spain, Israel and France.

== Early life and college career ==
Donaldson attended Oliver High School in Pittsburgh, Pennsylvania. He played college basketball for Edinboro University of Pennsylvania's Fighting Scots.

Donaldson finished his college career as Edinboro's all-time leading rebounder (1,100), ranks third in blocked shots (185) and tenth in career scoring (1,355 points).

== Professional career ==
In 2005, Donaldson started his professional career with the Portuguese team Barreirense Basket.

After playing four seasons in Spain with Ciudad de La Laguna, both in LEB-2 and LEB Oro, in July 2010 he signed for Menorca Basquet to play in the ACB League. Menorca Basquet general manager said about him, "He has improved a lot since he arrived to Spain, with a high standard of professional ethics. We hope he keeps the improvement and his contribution to many fields of the game".

One season later, Donaldson returned to Iberostar Canarias.

Donaldson has been named LEB Oro Most Valuable Player three times – in 2009, 2010 and 2012.

On July 24, 2013, Donaldson signed with the Israeli team Bnei Herzliya for the 2013–14 season. In 28 games played for Herzliya, Donaldson averaged 10.6 points, 8.3 rebounds, 1.5 assists and 1.4 steals per game.

On August 2, 2014, Donaldson signed a one-year deal with the French team ESSM Le Portel.

On May 5, 2015, Donaldson signed a one-year contract extension with Le Portel. That season, Donaldson helped the team to promote to the LNB Pro A as the second seed.

In his fourth season with Le Portel, Donaldson helped the team to reach the 2018 FIBA Europe Cup Quarterfinals, where they eventually lost to the Bakken Bears.

On September 18, 2018, Donaldson signed a one-year deal with Hapoel Be'er Sheva of the Israeli Premier League. In 36 games played for Be'er Sheva, he finished the season as the league second-leading rebounder with 9.4 per game, to go with 11.3 points, 3 assists and 1.1 steals per game. Donaldson helped Be'er Sheva reach the 2019 Israeli League Playoffs, where they eventually were eliminated by Hapoel Jerusalem in the Quarterfinals.

On October 17, 2019, Donaldson returned to Bnei Herzliya for a second stint, signing a one-year deal.

== Titles and awards ==
=== Titles ===
- National competitions:

- LEB 2 runner-up and promotion to LEB Oro with Ciudad de La Laguna: 2006/2007.
- Copa Príncipe de Asturias champion with Iberostar Canarias: 2012.
- LEB Oro title with Iberostar Canarias and promotion to Liga ACB.

=== Awards ===
- LEB Oro MVP: 2008–2009.
- LEB Oro MVP: 2009–2010.
- LEB Oro MVP: 2011–2012.
- 1 ACB MVP of the week, 7th week: 2010–2011.
- 1 ACB 5th on the rebounds leaders :2012–2013.

== Career statistics ==
Correct as of 8 November 2010

Season	Team	League	GP	MPG	RPG	APG	PPG
2006–07	Canarias	LEB-2	34	32:09	11.3	2	14.5
2007–08	Canarias	LEB Oro	34	31:03	10	1.9	12.1
2008–09	Canarias	LEB Oro	34	32:08	9.5	1.9	15.1
2009–10	Canarias	LEB Oro	34	30:58	11.1	2.7	17.4
2010–11	Menorca	ACB	34	25'	6.9	1.3	10.6
2012–13	Canarias	ACB	34	23'	6	1.6	7.6

Playoffs	Team	League	GP	MPG	RPG	APG	PPG
2006–07	Canarias	LEB-2	9	35:27	10.9	1.8	22.9
2007–08	Canarias	LEB Oro	2	34:58	7.5	1.0	9.0
2009–10	Canarias	LEB Oro	8	34:14	10.1	2.4	18.8
