= Cáceres CB =

- Nickname: Cáceres
- Founded: 1961
- Dissolved: 2005
- History: Cáceres CB (1961-2002); Cáceres CB (2003-05)
- Arena: Multiusos Ciudad de Cáceres
- Location: Cáceres, Extremadura
- Team colors: Green, black and white
Home	Away

Cáceres Club Baloncesto also known as Cáceres CB was a basketball club based in Cáceres, Spain. It was founded in 1961.

== History ==
Original Cáceres CB logo, used until 2003

Cáceres CB club participated in 11 ACB League (from 1992 to 2003) and in two editions of the LEB (2003–04 and 2004–05). The club disappeared at the end of 2004–05 season when it was playing in the LEB League because of its financial problems.

The most important achievement of Cáceres CB were the semifinals of the Korać Cup in 1995, and finishing as runner-up of the Copa del Rey in 1997.

== Season by season ==
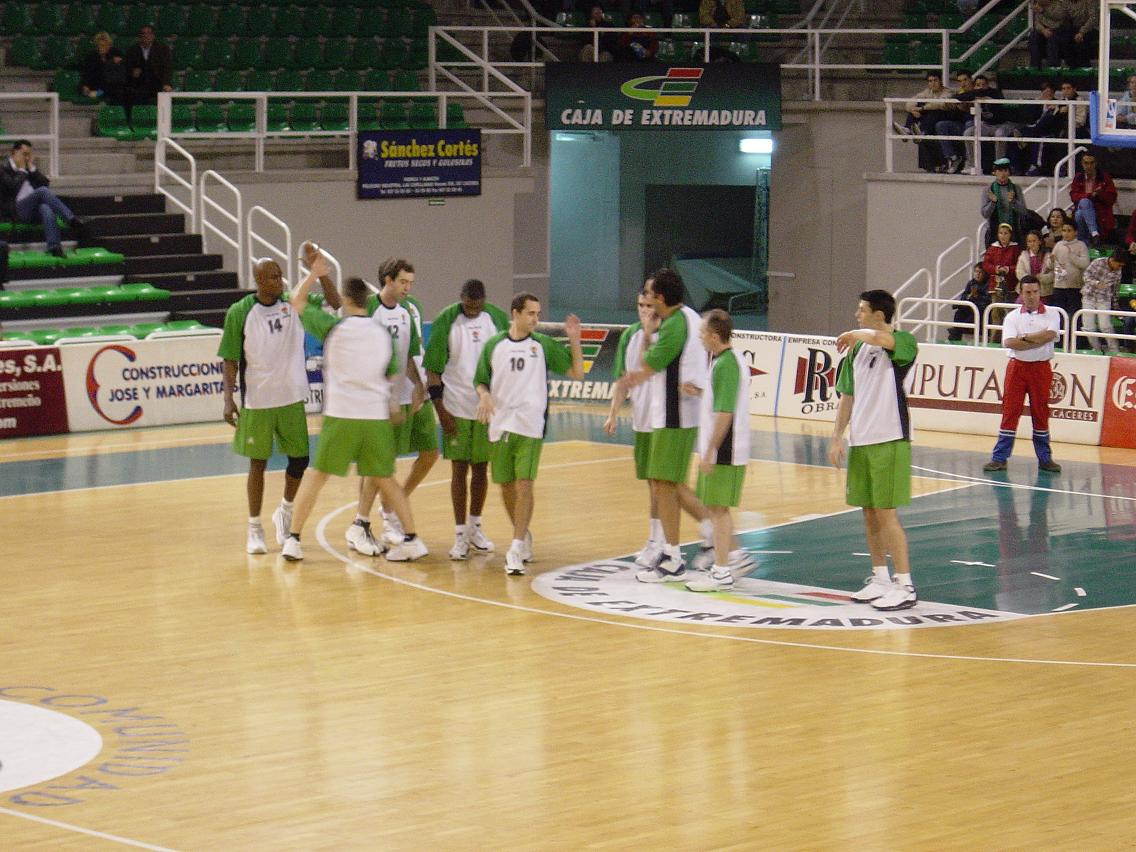
The team, before a 2002–03 ACB season game.

Season	Tier	Division	Pos.	W–L	Copa del Rey	European competitions		
1991–92	2	1ª División	2nd	30–18				
1992–93	1	Liga ACB	20th	12–24	Second round			
1993–94	1	Liga ACB	5th	18–16	First round			
1994–95	1	Liga ACB	13th	17–21	Second round	3 Korać Cup	SF	8–1–5
1995–96	1	Liga ACB	10th	19–19				
1996–97	1	Liga ACB	10th	18–16	Runner-up	3 Korać Cup	QF	9–3
1997–98	1	Liga ACB	15th	15–23		2 Eurocup	R32	7–5
1998–99	1	Liga ACB	12th	14–20				
1999–00	1	Liga ACB	9th	17–17				
2000–01	1	Liga ACB	10th	14–20	Semifinalist	3 Korać Cup	R16	7–1–2
2001–02	1	Liga ACB	15th	11–23				
2002–03	1	Liga ACB	17th	8–26				
2003–04	2	LEB	9th	16–18				
2004–05	2	LEB	8th	17–20				

== Trophies and awards ==
=== Trophies ===
- Copa Extremadura: (1)
  - 2001

== Notable players ==
- (Spain) Pepe Arcega
- (Spain) Juan Antonio Orenga
- (Spain) José Antonio Paraíso
- (Spain) (United States) Johnny Rogers
- (United States) Danya Abrams
- (United States) Raymond Brown
- (United States) Kevin Pritchard
- (United States) Rod Sellers
- (Federal Republic of Yugoslavia) Nebojša Ilić
