= Zoran Vrkić =

Croatian basketball player

Personal information
- Born: 16 August 1987 (age 39) Rijeka, SR Croatia, SFR Yugoslavia
- Listed height: 2.08 m (6 ft 10 in)

Career information
- Playing career: 2005–present
- Position: Small forward

Career history
- 2005–2006: Postojna
- 2006: Dubrovnik
- 2006–2008: Šibenik
- 2008–2010: Split
- 2010: Union Olimpija
- 2011: Peristeri
- 2011–2012: Biancoblu Basket Bologna
- 2012: Zadar
- 2012–2013: Ikaros Kallitheas
- 2013–2014: Bilbao Basket
- 2014–2015: GKK Šibenik
- 2015–2016: Gipuzkoa Basket
- 2016–2017: Karpoš Sokoli
- 2017–2018: Hermine Nantes
- 2018: Oviedo
- 2018: Dinamo București
- 2019: Kinmen Kaoliang Liquor
- 2019: Plateros de Fresnillo
- 2019–2020: Exxon Sport Club
- 2020: Manama Club
- 2020: Patrioti Levice
- 2020–2021: Exxon Sport Club
- 2021: Alkar
- 2021–2023: Tindastóll
- 2023: Grindavík
- 2023–2025: Breiðablik
- 2025–2026: Haukar

Zoran Vrkić (born 16 August 1987) is a Croatian professional basketball player.

== Playing career ==
Vrkić helped Manama Club win the Bahrain league in 2020. He began the 2020–21 season with Patrioti Levice, averaging 11.3 points, 2.2 rebounds, 1.7 assists and 1.0 steal per game in six games. Vrkić signed with Exxon Sport Club on 18 November 2020.

In 2021, he signed with Alkar of the HT Premijer liga. He averaged 9.0 points, 2.8 rebounds, and 2.8 assists per game.

In December 2021, Vrkić signed with Tindastóll of the Icelandic Úrvalsdeild karla. During the season, he averaged 8.7 points and 4.4 rebounds. On 24 January 2023, he was released by the club after averaging 7.7 points and 4.1 rebounds. Three days later, he signed with rival Úrvalsdeild club Grindavík. With Grindavík, he averaged 8.9 stig og 4.5 rebounds per game.

Vrkić stayed in the Úrvalsdeild the following season, signing with Breiðablik in October 2023.

In June 2025, Vrkić signed with Haukar.
