= Augusto Lima =

Brazilian basketball player

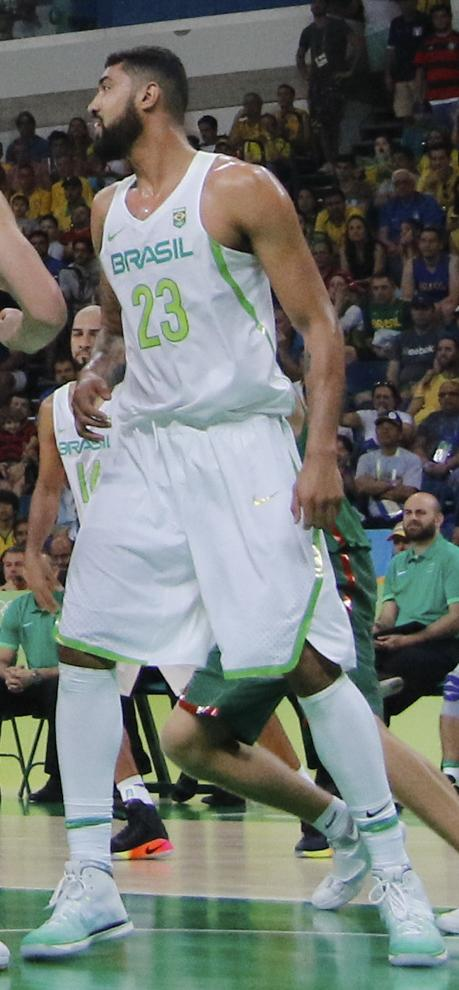

No. 23 – Panteras de Aguascalientes
- Position: Power forward / center
- League: LNBP

Personal information
- Born: September 17, 1991 (age 35) Rio de Janeiro, Brazil
- Listed height: 6 ft 10 in (2.08 m)
- Listed weight: 260 lb (118 kg)

Career information
- NBA draft: 2013: undrafted
- Playing career: 2009–present

Career history
- 2009–2013: Unicaja
- 2009–2011: →Axarquía
- 2011: →Granada
- 2013–2016: Murcia
- 2016–2018: Real Madrid
- 2016–2017: →Žalgiris
- 2017: →Beşiktaş
- 2018: →Xinjiang Flying Tigers
- 2018: →Murcia
- 2018: Cedevita
- 2018–2020: San Pablo Burgos
- 2020–2022: UCAM Murcia
- 2022–2024: Unicaja
- 2024: Leyma Coruña
- 2025: RANS Simba Bogor
- 2026: San Pablo Burgos
- 2026: Fuenlabrada
- 2026–present: Panteras de Aguascalientes

Career highlights
- FIBA Champions League champion (2024); Spanish League champion (2016); Spanish Cup winner (2016); Lithuanian LKL champion (2017); King Mindaugas Cup winner (2017)
Medals
Men's basketball
Representing Brazil
FIBA AmeriCup
Silver medal – second place	2011 Mar del Plata
Silver medal – second place	2022 Brazil
Pan American Games
Gold medal – first place	2015 Toronto

Augusto César Lima Brito (born September 17, 1991) is a Brazilian professional basketball player for Fuenlabrada of the Primera FEB. He is 6 ft 10 in (2.08 m) tall and he can play as either a power forward or a center. He is left handed, but at the age of ten, his parents forced him to learn to write and shoot with the right. He was born in Rio de Janeiro.

== Professional career ==
Lima went to Unicaja at 16, to play with the junior teams of the organization. He also combined his playing time with Málaga's farm team, Clínicas Rincón, of the Liga EBA.

Under coach Aíto García Reneses, in 2009–10, in 9 games played in the Spanish League, he averaged 6.4 points and 3.7 rebounds, in 15 minutes per game.

In the next season of 2010–11, his playing time in the Spanish League was limited to 7 games, with an average playing time of 4.6 minutes per game, with his numbers dropping down to 1.7 points, 0.9 rebounds, and 0.3 blocks per game.

Nevertheless, that same season, the Brazilian player had his first good performance in a EuroLeague game, in which he also produced his best performance of the season, in a game against Brose Baskets, the leader of the German League, in which Lima scored 14 points and grabbed 8 rebounds. He averaged 2.9 points and 3.1 rebounds per game during the Euroleague 2010–11 season.

In 2011, he was transferred to CB Granada, to fill the empty roster space following the departure of Robert Kurz, in the inside game of CB Granada, sharing minutes with Paulão Prestes.

In the 2011–12 season, he returned to Clínicas Rincón, a subsidiary of Unicaja, while also playing in 17 games in the Spanish League with the senior men's first team, but with little continuity, due to not having a European passport. On January 26, 2012, Lima acquired Spanish citizenship.

In 2013, Lima was registered in the 2013 NBA draft, but he was not drafted.

On 25 January 2016, Lima agreed a contract until the 2017–18 season with Real Madrid. On July 29, 2016, Real Madrid loaned him to Žalgiris for the 2016–17 season. He helped Žalgiris win the national championship and the cup tournament, and to a successful season in the Euroleague, where they narrowly missed the playoffs. On August 5, 2017, Real Madrid loaned him to Beşiktaş for the 2017–18 season. On December 31, 2017, he left Beşiktaş. On 2 January 2018, Lima signed with the Xinjiang Flying Tigers of the Chinese Basketball Association. After his contract with the Tigers expired, Lima signed with his former team UCAM Murcia. Lima started the 2018–2019 season with Croatian side KK Cedevita, but left the team after changes in the coaching staff. He signed with San Pablo Burgos in December.

On July 18, 2020, Lima signed a three-year deal with UCAM Murcia.

On July 18, 2022, he has signed with Unicaja of the Liga ACB.

On July 30, 2024, he signed with Leyma Coruña of the Liga ACB.

On January 16, 2026, he returned to San Pablo Burgos of the Liga ACB, signing until the end of the season. On March 31, 2026, he left Burgos and signed for Fuenlabrada of the Primera FEB.

== National team career ==
Lima was a member of the senior men's Brazilian national basketball team that won the silver medal at the 2011 FIBA Americas Championship in Mar del Plata, Argentina, which qualified Brazil for the 2012 Summer Olympics in London.

In 2013, Lima was summoned again to the Brazilian senior men's team, led by head coach Rubén Magnano, for the initial training phase before the 2013 FIBA Americas Championship, but due to a herniated disc, he had to be cut from the training of the team.
