= Ricardo Guillén =

Spanish basketball player

Personal information
- Born: June 17, 1976 (age 50) Santa Cruz de Tenerife, Spain
- Listed height: 2.07 m (6 ft 9 in)

Career information
- Playing career: 1994–present
- Position: Power forward
- Number: 4

Career history
- 1993–1999: Unicaja
- 1999–2000: Baloncesto León
- 2000–2001: Gijón Baloncesto
- 2002: CB Granada
- 2002–2003: Gran Canaria
- 2003–2004: Tenerife Baloncesto
- 2004–2005: Ciudad de Algeciras
- 2005–2007: Villa de Los Barrios
- 2007–2008: Cantabria Baloncesto
- 2008–2009: Villa de Los Barrios
- 2009–2013: Canarias
- 2013–2014: Clínicas Rincón
- 2014: Obradoiro
- 2014–2015: Clínicas Rincón
- 2015–2016: Palma
- 2016–2018: Marbella

Career highlights
- 4× LEB Oro MVP (2005, 2007, 2011, 2015); U-18 Eurobasket MVP (1994)
Medals
Men's basketball
Representing Spain
FIBA Europe Under-20 Championship
Silver medal – second place	1996 Turkey	Under-20 Team
FIBA Under-19 World Championship
Bronze medal – third place	1995 Athens	Under-19 Team
FIBA Europe Under-18 Championship
Bronze medal – third place	1994 Tel Aviv	Under-18 Team

Ricardo Guillén Mendoza (born 17 June 1976, in Santa Cruz de Tenerife, Canary Islands, Spain) is a Spanish basketball player. He currently plays as a power forward at CB Marbella La Cañada in Liga EBA.

After seven seasons in LEB Oro, he is the top scorer in the history of the league.

== Playing career ==
In 2012, Guillén won with Iberostar Canarias the Copa Príncipe and the LEB Oro, achieving the promotion to Liga ACB.

Guillén announced his retirement on 3 November 2016.

However, he continued playing as amateur player in the fifth tier with CB Marbella, achieving promotion to Liga EBA.

== Achievements ==
=== With Unicaja ===
- ACB runner-up (1994–95)

=== With Spain national youth teams ===
- Bronze medal in 1994 U-18 Eurobasket
- Bronze medal in 1995 U-19 WBC
- Silver medal in 1996 U-20 Eurobasket
