= Paulão Prestes =

Brazilian-Spanish basketball player

Personal information
- Born: February 15, 1988 (age 38) Monte Aprazível, São Paulo
- Listed height: 6 ft 11 in (2.11 m)
- Listed weight: 260 lb (118 kg)

Career information
- NBA draft: 2010: 2nd round, 45th overall pick
- Drafted by: Minnesota Timberwolves
- Playing career: 2005–2016
- Position: Center

Career history
- 2005–2006: COC Ribeirao Preto
- 2006–2009: Unicaja Málaga
- 2006–2009: → Clinicas Rincón
- 2009–2010: Murcia
- 2010–2012: Granada
- 2012: Pieno žvaigždės
- 2012–2013: Gran Canaria
- 2013: Brasília
- 2013–2014: Franca
- 2014–2016: Mogi das Cruzes
- 2016: Paulistano/Unimed

Career highlights
- Brazilian League Most Improved Player (2014); All-Brazilian League Team (2014)
- Stats at Basketball Reference
Medals
Men's basketball
Representing Brazil
Pan American Games
Gold medal – first place	2007 Rio de Janeiro
FIBA South American Championship
Gold medal – first place	2006 Caracas

Paulo Sérgio "Paulão" Prestes (born February 15, 1988, in Monte Aprazível, São Paulo) is a Brazilian-Spanish former professional basketball player.

== Professional career ==
Prestes was selected by the Minnesota Timberwolves, in the second round of the 2010 NBA draft. However, he never played in the NBA. During his pro club career, some of the teams Prestes played with included Pieno žvaigždės, Gran Canaria, and Paulistano/Unimed.
