= Nedžad Sinanović =

Bosnian former basketball player (born 1983)

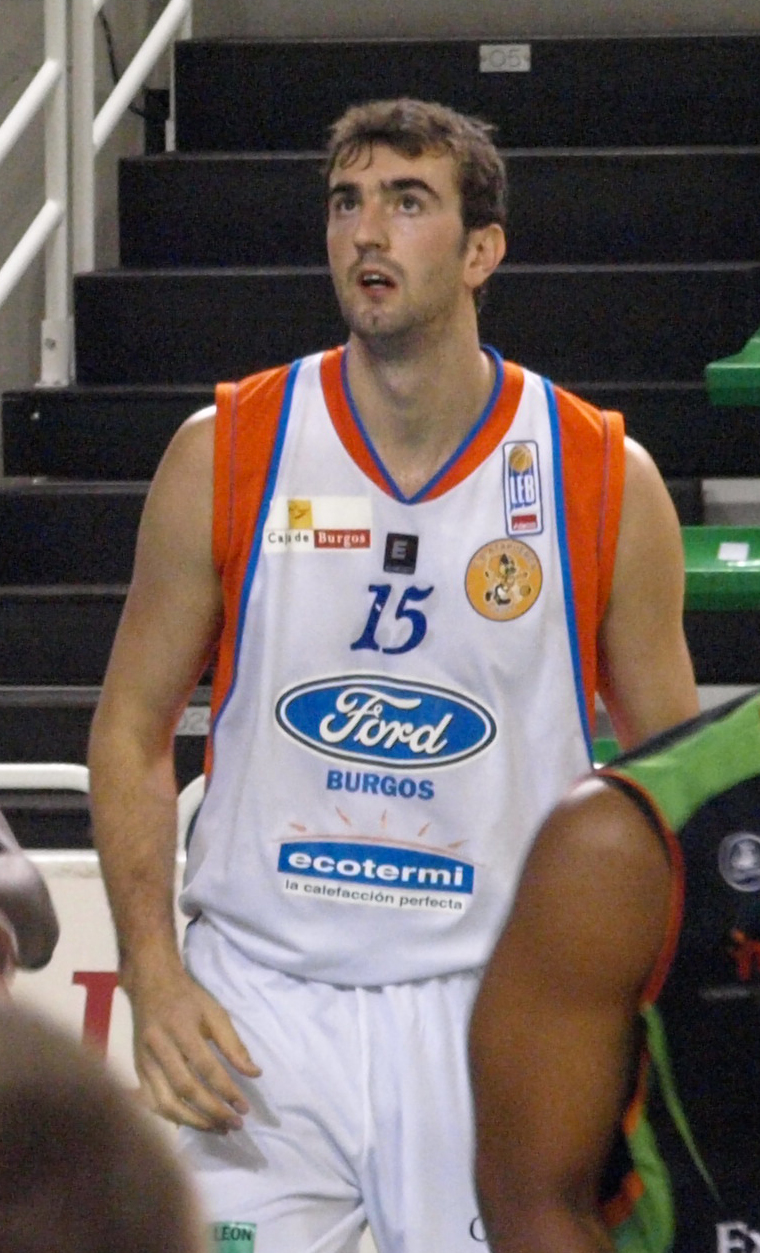
- Sinanović, in a game with Ford Burgos

Personal information
- Born: 29 January 1983 (age 43) Zavidovići, SR Bosnia and Herzegovina, Yugoslavia
- Listed height: 7 ft 3.5 in (2.22 m)
- Listed weight: 250 lb (113 kg)

Career information
- NBA draft: 2003: 2nd round, 54th overall pick
- Drafted by: Portland Trail Blazers
- Playing career: 2003–2014
- Position: Center

Career history
- 2003–2005: RBC Verviers-Pepinster
- 2005–2009: Real Madrid
- 2007–2008: →Köln 99ers
- 2008–2009: →Ford Burgos
- 2009–2012: Unicaja
- 2009–2011: →Clínicas Rincón
- 2012–2014: CB Valladolid
- 2014: Petrochimi Bandar Imam

Career highlights
- 2× Liga ACB champion (2005, 2007); ULEB Cup champion (2007)
- Stats at Basketball Reference

Nedžad Sinanović (born 29 January 1983) is a Bosnian former basketball player.

== Professional career ==
In 2003, Sinanović was drafted by the Portland Trail Blazers as the 54th overall selection of the 2003 NBA draft. Since then, he has played professionally in Belgium, Spain, Germany and Iran.

On 30 September 2012, Sinanović was the MVP of round 1 of the 2012–13 ACB season.

In April 2014, he left Valladolid for Petrochimi Bandar Imam BC.

In August 2012, Sinanović made his debut with the Bosnia and Herzegovina national team during the qualifiers for the 2013 FIBA Eurobasket.
