= 2011 LEB Oro Playoffs =

The 2011 LEB Oro promotion Playoffs was the final phase of the 2010–2011 LEB Oro season. It will start on April 29, 2011, and it finished on June 1, 3 or 5 if necessary.

All the series were best-of-5 games. The winner of the playoffs was Blu:sens Monbús and promoted to 2011–12 ACB season with CB Murcia, the champion of the regular season.

Quarterfinals
2	Blu:sens Monbús	3
9	Cáceres Creativa	1
5	Baloncesto León	1
6	Leche Río Breogán	3
3	Ford Burgos	3
8	Grupo Iruña Navarra	1
4	Girona FC	3
7	Tenerife Canarias	2

Semifinals
2	Blu:sens Monbús	3
6	Leche Río Breogán	0
3	Ford Burgos	3
4	Girona FC	0

Finals
2	Blu:sens Monbús	3
3	Ford Burgos	1

== Quarterfinals ==
Quarterfinals were to be played on April 29, May 1, May 4 and if necessary May 6 and 8.

=== Blu:sens Monbús - Cáceres Creativa ===
29 Apr 2011
21:00 CET

Stats

Blu:sens Monbús	79–78	Cáceres Creativa
Scoring by quarter: 24–25, 14–22, 19–15, 22–16
Pts: Corbacho, 21; Rebs: Junyent, 9 Asts: Rodríguez, 9 Eff: Corbacho, 19		Pts: Cherry, 16; Rebs: McCoy, 5 Asts: Sánchez, 3 Eff: Antelo, 17

Fontes do Sar, Santiago de Compostela

1 May 2011
19:00 CET

Stats

Blu:sens Monbús	89–63	Cáceres Creativa
Scoring by quarter: 30–20, 24–16, 29–21, 13–26
Pts: Corbacho, 20; Rebs: Hopkins, 8 Asts: Rodríguez, 12; Eff: Rodríguez, 24		Pts: Angulo, 20; Rebs: McCoy, 9 Asts: Cherry, 4 Eff: Angulo, 22

Fontes do Sar, Santiago de Compostela

4 May 2011
21:00 CET

Stats

Cáceres Creativa	77–72	Blu:sens Monbús
Scoring by quarter: 21–18, 15–14, 22–18, 19–22
Pts: Sánchez, 23; Rebs: Antelo, 12; Asts: Mediano, Angulo, 3 Eff: Mediano, McCoy, 17		Pts: Bulfoni, 16; Rebs: Ruffin, Kendall, 7 Asts: Rodríguez, 5 Eff: Ruffin, Kendall, 10

Multiusos Ciudad de Cáceres, Cáceres

6 May 2011
21:00 CET

Stats

Cáceres Creativa	73–93	Blu:sens Monbús
Scoring by quarter: 12–23, 17–27, 30–25, 14–18
Pts: Antelo, 14; Rebs: Antelo, 8 Asts: Humphrey, 4 Eff: Antelo, Humphrey, 17		Pts: Corbacho, 27; Rebs: Kendall, 10; Asts: Rodríguez, 4 Eff: Junyent, 27
Blu:sens Monbús wins the series by 3–1

Multiusos Ciudad de Cáceres, Cáceres

=== Ford Burgos - Grupo Iruña Navarra ===
29 Apr 2011
21:00 CET

Stats

Ford Burgos	68–63	Grupo Iruña Navarra
Scoring by quarter: 14–18, 21–14, 17–17, 16–14
Pts: Tillman, 17; Rebs: Tillman, 7 Asts: Mena, 5 Eff: Tillman, 18		Pts: Bas, 18; Rebs: Sanz, 9 Asts: Blair, 5 Eff: Blair, 22

Polideportivo El Plantío, Burgos

1 May 2011
19:00 CET

Stats

Ford Burgos	85–83	Grupo Iruña Navarra
Scoring by quarter: 20–18, 23–22, 15–22, 27–21
Pts: Castro, 24; Rebs: Toledo, 8 Asts: López, 4 Eff: Lóránt, Castro, 25		Pts: Narros, 28; Rebs: Lee, Joseph, 5 Asts: Sanz, 7 Eff: Narros, 21

Polideportivo El Plantío, Burgos

4 May 2011
20:30 CET

Stats

Grupo Iruña Navarra	67–58	Ford Burgos
Scoring by quarter: 18–17, 10–21, 23–7, 16–13
Pts: Bas, 19; Rebs: Blair, 15; Asts: Blair, 2 Eff: Blair, 18		Pts: Tillman, 17; Rebs: Castro, 7 Asts: Four players, 1 Eff: Tillman, 17

Polideportivo Anaitasuna, Pamplona

6 May 2011
20:30 CET

Stats

Grupo Iruña Navarra	65–78	Ford Burgos
Scoring by quarter: 22–17, 19–17, 14–20, 10–24
Pts: Bas, 17; Rebs: Blair, 7 Asts: Joseph, 3 Eff: Bas, 12		Pts: Lóránt, 14; Rebs: Tillman, 9 Asts: Toledo, 3 Eff: Lóránt, 20
Ford Burgos wins the series by 3–1

Polideportivo Anaitasuna, Pamplona

=== Girona FC - Isla de Tenerife Canarias ===
29 Apr 2011
21:15 CET

Stats

Girona FC	74–63	Isla de Tenerife Canarias
Scoring by quarter: 20–18, 16–25, 19–10, 19–10
Pts: Ortega, 19; Rebs: Ortega, 11; Asts: Ordín, 6 Eff: Ortega, 29		Pts: Guillén, 28; Rebs: Guillén, 9 Asts: Urreizti, Chagoyen, 3 Eff: Guillén, 33

Palau Girona-Fontajau, Girona

1 May 2011
20:00 CET

Stats

Girona FC	76–73	Isla de Tenerife Canarias
Scoring by quarter: 22–22, 16–20, 19–21, 19–10
Pts: Ordín, 24; Rebs: Ortega, Rost, 9 Asts: Pino, Canals, 3 Eff: Rost, 23		Pts: Chagoyen, 18; Rebs: Guillén, 8 Asts: Guillén, Lampropoulos, 2 Eff: Guillén, 26

Palau Girona-Fontajau, Girona

4 May 2011
22:00 CET

Stats

Isla de Tenerife Canarias	77–65	Girona FC
Scoring by quarter: 21–13, 21–19, 20–9, 15–24
Pts: Guillén, 20; Rebs: Guillén, 13; Asts: Sàbat, 4 Eff: Guillén, 24		Pts: Ordín, 23; Rebs: Rost, Pino, 4 Asts: Canals, 3 Eff: Ordín, 18

Insular Santiago Martín, La Laguna

6 May 2011
22:00 CET

Stats

Isla de Tenerife Canarias	93–65	Girona FC
Scoring by quarter: 22–13, 22–26, 20–21, 29–15
Pts: Guillén, 19; Rebs: Guillén, 7 Asts: Yáñez, 5 Eff: Guillén, 29		Pts: Ortega, 15; Rebs: Ortega, 10; Asts: Canals, 3 Eff: Ortega, 18

Insular Santiago Martín, La Laguna

8 May 2011
17:00 CET

Stats

Girona FC	86–83	Isla de Tenerife Canarias
Pts: Ortega, 22; Rebs: Ortega, 8 Asts: Ordín, 4 Eff: Ordín, 26		Pts: Chagoyen, 23; Rebs: Chagoyen, 9 Asts: Urreizti, 4 Eff: Chagoyen, 25
Girona FC wins the series by 3–2

Palau Girona-Fontajau, Girona

=== Baloncesto León - Leche Río Breogán ===
29 Apr 2011
20:45 CET

Stats

Baloncesto León	82–69	Leche Río Breogán
Scoring by quarter: 14–11, 18–20, 29–20, 21–18
Pts: García, 28; Rebs: Seawright, 9 Asts: Quezada, 9 Eff: García, 33		Pts: Gomes, 16; Rebs: Brown, 7 Asts: Forcada, 3 Eff: Arteaga, 19

Palacio de los Deportes, León

1 May 2011
19:30 CET

Stats

Baloncesto León	76–82	Leche Río Breogán
Scoring by quarter: 18–18, 20–19, 24–16, 14–29
Pts: Quezada, 16; Rebs: Seawright, 7 Asts: Quezada, 6 Eff: Rocchia, 12		Pts: Feldeine, 18; Rebs: Arteaga, 12; Asts: Forcada, 4 Eff: Arteaga, 23

Palacio de los Deportes, León

4 May 2011
21:00 CET

Stats

Leche Río Breogán	75–73	Baloncesto León
Scoring by quarter: 22–20, 13–16, 16–22, 24–15
Pts: Feldeine, 20; Rebs: Brown, 12; Asts: Vallmajó, 6 Eff: Arteaga, 21		Pts: Seawright, 15; Rebs: Seawright, 9 Asts: Bernabé, 5 Eff: González, 18

Pazo Provincial dos Deportes, Lugo

6 May 2011
21:00 CET

Stats

Leche Río Breogán	76–74	Baloncesto León
Scoring by quarter: 17–14, 17–23, 18–25, 24–12
Pts: Feldeine, 20; Rebs: Arteaga, 6 Asts: Vallmajó, 7 Eff: Feldeine, 18		Pts: González, 21; Rebs: Seawright, 9 Asts: Bernabé, 6 Eff: González, 18
Leche Río Breogán wins the series by 3–1

Pazo Provincial dos Deportes, Lugo

== Semifinals ==
Semifinals will be played on May 13, 15, 18 and if necessary 20 and 22.

=== Blu:sens Monbús – Leche Río Breogán ===
13 May 2011
21:00 CET

Stats

Blu:sens Monbús	84–67	Leche Río Breogán
Scoring by quarter: 21–22, 19–15, 22–14, 22–16
Pts: Corbacho, 18; Rebs: Ruffin, 8 Asts: Rodríguez, 5 Eff: Corbacho, 18		Pts: Feldeine, 18; Rebs: Feldeine, Brown, 5 Asts: Three players, 2 Eff: Vallmajó, 13

Fontes do Sar, Santiago de Compostela

13 May 2011
19:00 CET

Stats

Blu:sens Monbús	97–67	Leche Río Breogán
Scoring by quarter: 22–25, 34–16, 20–11, 21–15
Pts: Corbacho, 22; Rebs: Ruffin, 8 Asts: Sánchez, 7 Eff: Corbacho, 25		Pts: Vallmajó, 15; Rebs: Hicks, 6 Asts: Arteaga, 4 Eff: Vallmajó, 17

Fontes do Sar, Santiago de Compostela

18 May 2011
21:00 CET

Stats

Leche Río Breogán	54–77	Blu:sens Monbús
Scoring by quarter: 19–25, 19–16, 7–19, 9–17
Pts: Hicks, Arteaga, 11; Rebs: Brown, 6 Asts: Mokongo, Forcada, 4 Eff: Hicks, 16		Pts: Kendall, 21; Rebs: Junyent, 9 Asts: Junyent, 3 Eff: Kendall, Junyent, 28
Blu:sens Monbús wins the series by 3–0

Pazo Provincial dos Deportes, Lugo

=== Ford Burgos – Girona FC ===
13 May 2011
21:00 CET

Stats

Ford Burgos	73–72	Girona FC
Scoring by quarter: 22–29, 10–10, 19–15, 22–18
Pts: Downs, 26; Rebs: Downs, 10; Asts: Downs, 6 Eff: Downs, 36		Pts: Ordín, 17; Rebs: Kedžo, 8 Asts: Ortega, 3 Eff: Kedžo, 17

Polideportivo El Plantío, Burgos

13 May 2011
20:00 CET

Stats

Ford Burgos	92–71	Girona FC
Scoring by quarter: 31–24, 23–16, 22–18, 16–13
Pts: Lóránt, 20; Rebs: Lóránt, Tillman, 7 Asts: Lóránt, 5 Eff: Lóránt, 31		Pts: Pino, 16; Rebs: Kedžo, 8 Asts: Ordín, 3 Eff: Rost, 17

Polideportivo El Plantío, Burgos

18 May 2011
21:00 CET

Stats

Girona FC	63–71	Ford Burgos
Scoring by quarter: 14–23, 17–20, 23–16, 9–12
Pts: Kedžo, 21; Rebs: Labbate, 7 Asts: Rost, 3 Eff: Kedžo, 19		Pts: Tillman, 22; Rebs: Lóránt, 10; Asts: López, 4 Eff: Tillman, 25
Ford Burgos wins the series by 3–0

Palau Girona-Fontajau, Girona

== Finals ==
The Playoffs Finals will be played on May 27, 29, June 1 and if necessary 3 and 5.

27 May 2011
21:00 CET

Stats

Blu:sens Monbús	60–52	Ford Burgos
Scoring by quarter: 19–9, 19–11, 6–17, 16–15
Pts: Bulfoni, 16; Rebs: Ruffin, 10; Asts: Rodríguez, 3 Eff: Hopkins, 19		Pts: Tillman, 18; Rebs: Tillman, 7 Asts: Mena, 4 Eff: Tillman, 16

Fontes do Sar, Santiago de Compostela

29 May 2011
19:00 CET

Stats

Blu:sens Monbús	63–53	Ford Burgos
Scoring by quarter: 18–18, 14–13, 21–14, 10–8
Pts: Corbacho, 11; Rebs: Hopkins, 10; Asts: Rodríguez, 5 Eff: Junyent, 19		Pts: Castro, 21; Rebs: Gómez, 5 Asts: López, 4 Eff: Castro, 20

Fontes do Sar, Santiago de Compostela

1 June 2011
21:00 CET

Stats

Ford Burgos	76–72	Blu:sens Monbús
Scoring by quarter: 16–20, 19–14, 20–13, 21–25
Pts: Downs, 20; Rebs: Gómez, 12; Asts: Five players, 2 Eff: Gómez, 20		Pts: Rodríguez, 17; Rebs: Junyent, 5 Asts: Junyent, 5 Eff: Rodríguez, 26

Polideportivo El Plantío, Burgos

3 June 2011
21:00 CET

Stats

Ford Burgos	64–75	Blu:sens Monbús
Scoring by quarter: 5–17, 22–16, 18–18, 19–24
Pts: Downs, 22; Rebs: Tillman, 8 Asts: López, 6 Eff: Downs, 21		Pts: Corbacho, 21; Rebs: Junyent, 7 Asts: Rodríguez, 5 Eff: Hopkins, 21
Blu:sens Monbús wins the series by 3–1 and promotes to ACB

Polideportivo El Plantío, Burgos
