= Balearic Islands autonomous basketball team =

Balearic Islands
- FIBA ranking: N/A
- Joined FIBA: N/A
- National federation: Basketball Federation of Balearic Islands
- Coach: Xavi Sastre

Olympic Games
- Appearances: N/A
- Medals: N/A

FIBA World Cup
- Appearances: N/A
- Medals: N/A

Eurobasket
- Appearances: N/A
- Medals: N/A
Home	Away

The Balearic Islands autonomous basketball team is the basketball team of Balearic Islands. The team is not affiliated to FIBA, so only plays friendly games.

== History ==
Balearic Islands will play two games in June 2013 against Lithuania. The head coach of the team, Xavi Sastre, called up two ACB champions like Rudy Fernández and Sergio Llull and another eight players in the league.

== Roster ==
This is the roster of the Balearic Islands team for the 2013 games against Lithuania.

Balearic Islands Basketball Team roster
Players
Coaches

Pos.	No.	Name	Age – Date of birth	Height	Club	Ctr.
PG		Sergio Llull	25 – 25 November 1987	1.92 m (6 ft 4 in)	Real Madrid Baloncesto	(Spain)
PG		Pedro Llompart	31 – 9 January 1982	1.85 m (6 ft 1 in)	Basket Zaragoza 2002	(Spain)
SG		Rudy Fernández	28 – 4 April 1985	1.98 m (6 ft 6 in)	Real Madrid Baloncesto	(Spain)
SG		Miki Servera	20 – 14 July 1992	1.98 m (6 ft 6 in)	CB Murcia	(Spain)
SF		Pere Tomàs	23 – 5 September 1989	2.02 m (6 ft 8 in)	Joventut Badalona	(Spain)
SG		Álex Abrines	19 – 1 August 1993	1.98 m (6 ft 6 in)	FC Barcelona Bàsquet	(Spain)
SF		Alberto Corbacho	28 – 1 September 1984	2.01 m (6 ft 7 in)	Obradoiro CAB	(Spain)
SF		Joan Sastre	21 – 10 December 1991	2.01 m (6 ft 7 in)	CDB Sevilla	(Spain)
PF		Miki García Stobart	28 – 22 March 1985	2.06 m (6 ft 9 in)	Obradoiro CAB	(Spain)
PF		Álex Suárez	20 – 1 January 1993	2.04 m (6 ft 8 in)	Joventut Badalona	(Spain)
C		Alfons Alzamora	34 – 20 May 1979	2.06 m (6 ft 9 in)	FC Barcelona Bàsquet B	(Spain)
C		Jan Orfila	27 – 1 January 1986	2.06 m (6 ft 9 in)	CB Peñas Huesca	(Spain)

Head coach

- (Balearic Islands) Xavi Sastre

Legend

- (C) Team captain
- Club field describes pro club
  during the 2012–13 season

== Games played ==
28 June 2013	Balearic Islands	83–84	Lithuania students team	Palma
	Scoring by quarter: 19–18, 27–17, 17–19, 20–30
	Pts: R. Fernández 21	Report	Pts: Orelik 17	Arena: Palma Arena; Attendance: 3,200; Referees: Hierrezuelo, Hermida, Sandías

29 June 2013	Balearic Islands	79–86	Lithuania students team	Mahón
	Scoring by quarter: 19–19, 20–26, 21–24, 19–17
	Pts: Llull 14	Report	Pts: Orelik 14	Arena: Pavelló Menorca; Attendance: 2,000; Referees: Hierrezuelo, Hermida, Armendáriz
