= 2012–13 ACB season =

ACB
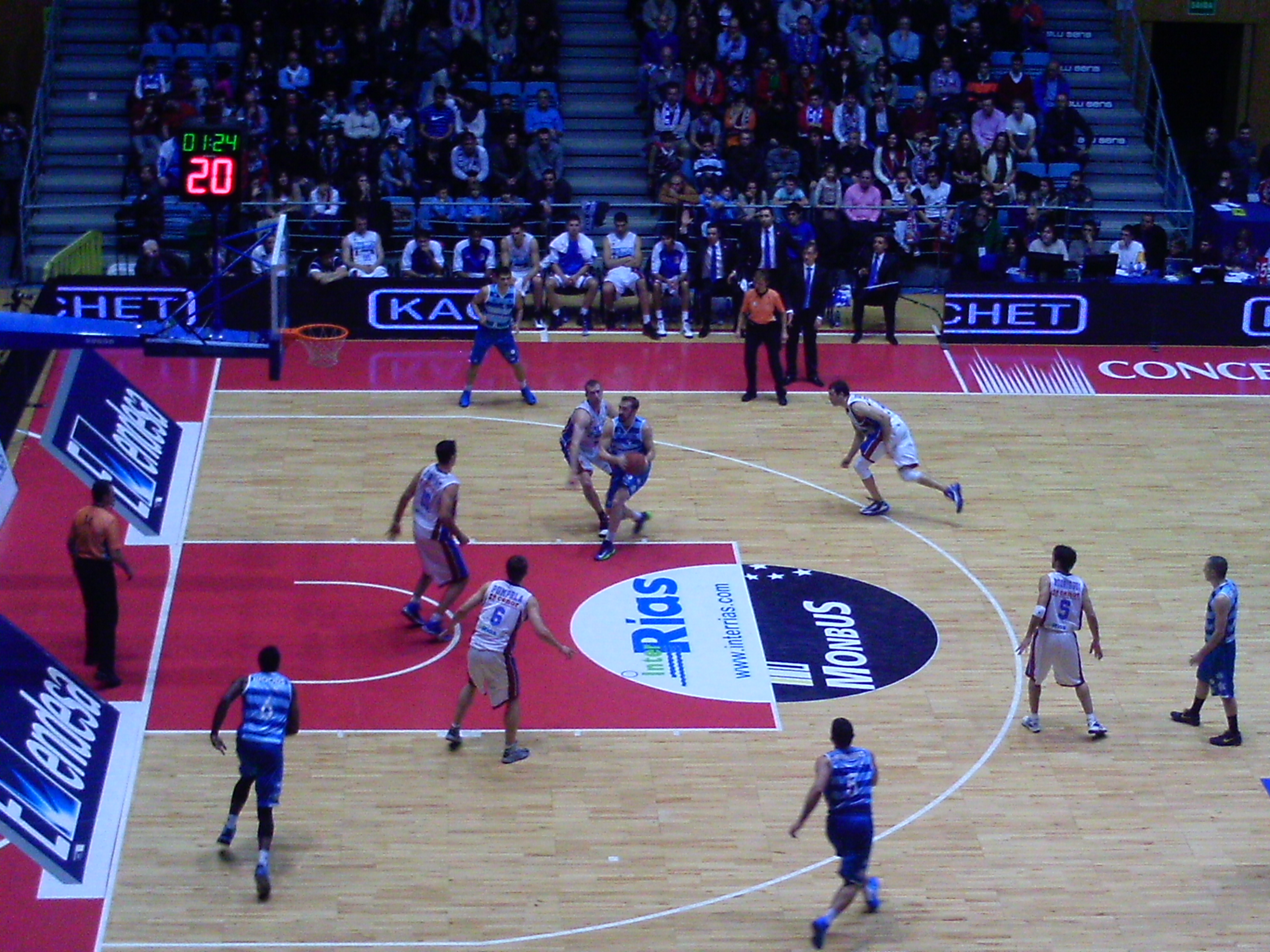
- Season: 2012–13
- Duration: September 29, 2012 – May 19, 2013
- Games played: 306 (regular season); 22 (playoffs)
- Teams: 18

Regular season
- Top seed: Real Madrid (30–4)
- Season MVP: (Spain) Nikola Mirotić
- Relegated: ~~La Bruixa d'Or~~ (Note: Remained in ACB after Ford Burgos and Lucentum Alicante didn't give the requirements for joining the league.); ~~Lagun Aro GBC~~

Finals
- Champions: Real Madrid; 31st title
- Runners-up: FC Barcelona
- Finals MVP: (Spain) Felipe Reyes

Awards
- Rising Star: (Tunisia) Salah Mejri

Statistical leaders
Points	(Canada) Carl English	17.2
Rebounds	(Spain) Nacho Martín	7.1
Assists	(Puerto Rico) Andrés Rodríguez	5.9
Index Rating	(Spain) Nacho Martín	18.2

Records
- Highest attendance: 14,381 (Baskonia 81–80 Bilbao)
- Lowest attendance: 2,300 (Cajasol 68–76 Fuenlabrada)
- Average attendance: 6,221 ▼ ^{−3.7%}
- All statistics correct as of 9 September 2014.

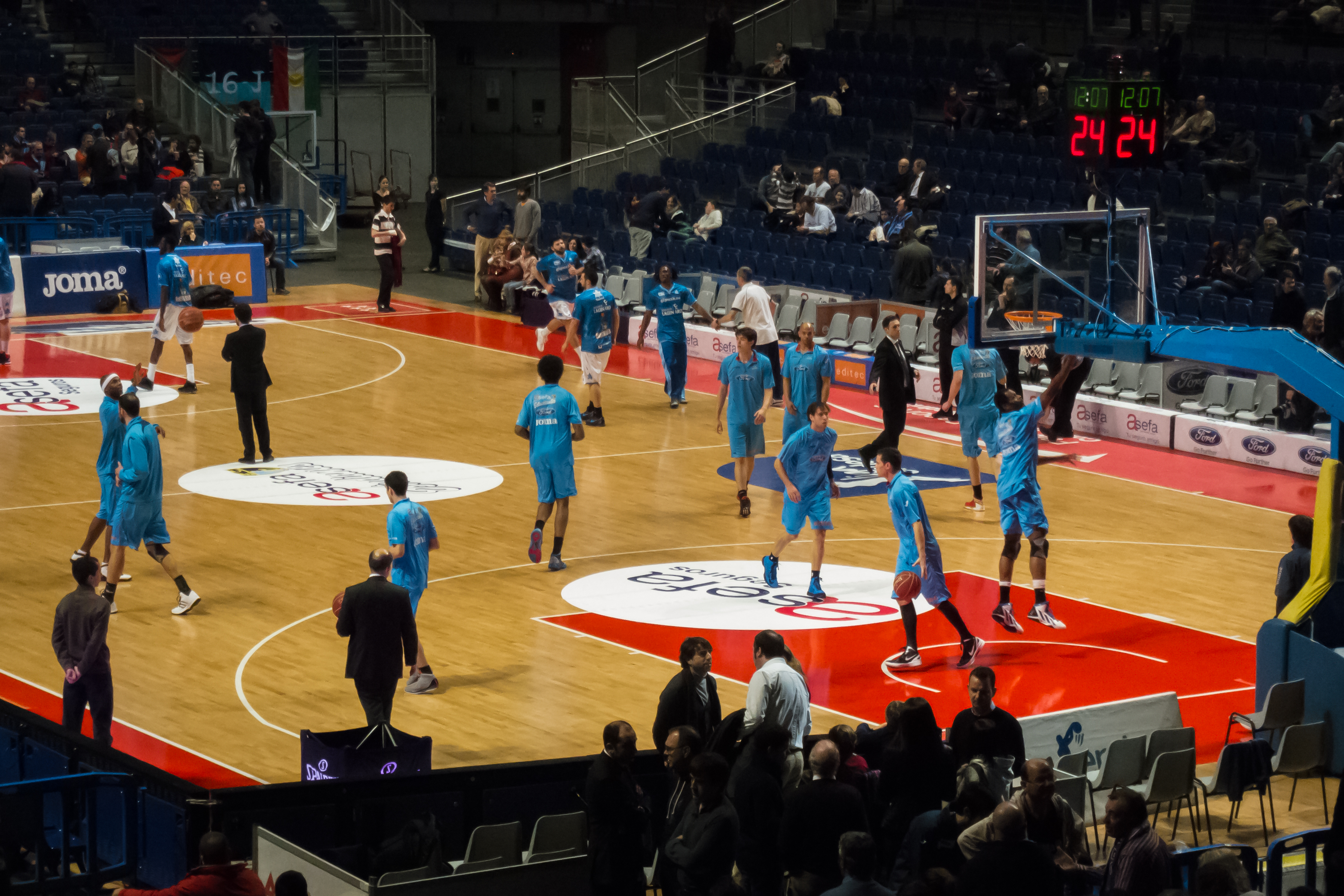
Madrid - Estudiantes - Lagun Aro

The 2012–13 ACB season was the 30th season of the Spanish basketball league Liga ACB, also called Liga Endesa in its sponsored identity.

The regular season started on September 29, 2012 and ended on May 19, 2013. Playoffs started on May 23 and ended on June 19. FC Barcelona Regal were the defending champions, and Real Madrid took the 2013 title.

== Teams and venues ==
- Relegated to LEB Oro
  - ~~Asefa Estudiantes~~ (17th)
  - ~~Blancos de Rueda Valladolid~~ (18th)
- Promoted from LEB Oro
  - Iberostar Canarias (Champion)
  - ~~Menorca Bàsquet~~ (2nd)

Asefa Estudiantes and Blancos de Rueda Valladolid remained in Liga ACB after Iberostar Canarias and Menorca Bàsquet resigned to promote.

On 20 July 2012, CB Lucentum Alicante sold its berth to the ACB and this was for CB 1939 Canarias, who finally promoted.

Team	Home city	Stadium	Capacity	Last season	Head coach	Season
Asefa Estudiantes	Madrid	Palacio de los Deportes	13,500	17th	(Spain) Txus Vidorreta	1st
Blancos de Rueda Valladolid	Valladolid	Polideportivo Pisuerga	6,800	18th	(Spain) Roberto González	2nd
Blu:sens Monbús	Santiago de Compostela	Multiusos Fontes do Sar	6,050	13th	(Spain) Moncho Fernández	3rd
CAI Zaragoza	Zaragoza	Príncipe Felipe Arena	10,744	10th	(Spain) José Luis Abós	4th
Cajasol	Sevilla	Palacio San Pablo	10,200	7th	(Spain) Aíto García Reneses	1st
CB Canarias	San Cristóbal de La Laguna	Pabellón Insular Santiago Martín	5,100	1st (LEB Oro)	(Spain) Alejandro Martínez	7th
FC Barcelona Regal	Barcelona	Palau Blaugrana	8,250	1st	(Spain) Xavi Pascual	6th
FIATC Mutua Joventut	Badalona	Palau Municipal d'Esports	12,500	11th	(Spain) Salva Maldonado	2nd
Herbalife Gran Canaria	Las Palmas de Gran Canaria	Centro Insular de Deportes	5,200	14th	(Spain) Pedro Martínez	7th (4th)
La Bruixa d'Or	Manresa	Nou Congost	5,000	12th	(Spain) Jaume Ponsarnau	7th
Laboral Kutxa	Vitoria-Gasteiz	Fernando Buesa Arena	15,504	3rd	(Croatia) Žan Tabak	1st
Lagun Aro GBC	San Sebastián	San Sebastián Arena	11,000	5th	(Spain) Sito Alonso	2nd
Mad-Croc Fuenlabrada	Fuenlabrada	Fernando Martin	5,700	16th	(Spain) Trifón Poch	1st
Real Madrid	Madrid	Palacio de los Deportes	13,500	2nd	(Spain) Pablo Laso	2nd
UCAM Murcia	Murcia	Palacio de Deportes de Murcia	7,454	15th	(Spain) Óscar Quintana	1st
Unicaja	Málaga	Martín Carpena	10,500	9th	(Croatia) Jasmin Repeša	1st
Uxúe Bilbao Basket	Bilbao	Bilbao Arena	10,014	6th	(Greece) Fotis Katsikaris	4th
Valencia Basket	Valencia	Fuente San Luis	9,000	4th	(Croatia) Velimir Perasović	2nd

== Managerial changes ==
=== Before the start of the season ===
Team	Outgoing manager	Manner of departure	Replaced by	Date of appointment
Unicaja	(Spain) Luis Casimiro	End of contract	(Croatia) Jasmin Repeša	June 6, 2012
Cajasol	(Spain) Joan Plaza	End of contract	(Spain) Aíto García Reneses	July 18, 2012
Asefa Estudiantes	(Spain) Trifón Poch	End of contract	(Spain) Txus Vidorreta	July 20, 2012

=== During the season ===
Team	Outgoing manager	Manner of departure	Date of vacancy	Replaced by	Date of appointment	Position in the table
Mad-Croc Fuenlabrada	(Spain) Porfirio Fisac	Sacked	November 13, 2012	(Spain) Trifón Poch	November 15, 2012	16th (1–6)
Laboral Kutxa	(Montenegro) Duško Ivanović	Sacked	November 18, 2012	(Croatia) Žan Tabak	November 19, 2012	8th (5–3, 1–5 in EL)

== Regular season ==
=== League table ===
#	Teams	P	W	L	PF	PA	Qualification or relegation
1	Real Madrid	34	30	4	2985	2563	Qualified for the Playoffs
2	Laboral Kutxa	34	25	9	2815	2695	Qualified for the Playoffs
3	FC Barcelona Regal	34	23	11	2693	2436	Qualified for the Playoffs
4	Valencia Basket	34	22	12	2764	2579	Qualified for the Playoffs
5	CAI Zaragoza	34	21	13	2692	2460	Qualified for the Playoffs
6	Uxúe Bilbao Basket	34	19	15	2762	2665	Qualified for the Playoffs
7	Herbalife Gran Canaria	34	19	15	2491	2416	Qualified for the Playoffs
8	Blu:sens Monbús	34	18	16	2556	2507	Qualified for the Playoffs
9	Unicaja	34	18	16	2481	2475	
10	CB Canarias	34	17	17	2746	2806	
11	FIATC Mutua Joventut	34	16	18	2653	2738	
12	Asefa Estudiantes	34	15	19	2712	2704	
13	UCAM Murcia	34	13	21	2691	2888	
14	Mad-Croc Fuenlabrada	34	12	22	2530	2695	
15	Cajasol	34	12	22	2448	2606	
16	Blancos de Rueda Valladolid	34	12	22	2644	2838	
17	Lagun Aro GBC	34	8	26	2492	2750	Relegation to LEB Oro
18	La Bruixa d'Or	34	6	28	2574	2908	Relegation to LEB Oro

=== Positions by round ===
Team\Round																																		
	01	02	03	04	05	06	07	08	09	10	11	12	13	14	15	16	17	18	19	20	21	22	23	24	25	26	27	28	29	30	31	32	33	34
Real Madrid	5	1	1	1	1	1	1	1	1	1	1	1	1	1	1	1	1	1	1	1	1	1	1	1	1	1	1	1	1	1	1	1	1	1
Laboral Kutxa	13	9	7	4	8	5	2	8	6	4	2	4	2	2	2	2	2	2	2	2	2	2	2	2	2	2	2	2	2	2	2	2	2	2
FC Barcelona Regal	12	13	11	8	7	10	7	5	7	6	6	7	7	8	7	7	7	6	6	4	3	3	3	3	3	3	3	3	3	3	3	3	3	3
Valencia Basket	1	3	3	2	4	2	3	2	2	2	3	2	3	3	3	3	3	3	3	5	4	6	7	6	5	4	5	5	4	4	4	4	4	4
CAI Zaragoza	6	2	6	10	11	11	10	6	5	8	7	5	6	6	6	5	6	7	7	7	7	5	6	5	7	7	7	7	5	5	6	6	5	5
Uxúe Bilbao Basket	11	10	10	7	6	3	6	4	4	3	5	6	4	4	5	6	5	4	4	6	5	4	4	4	4	5	4	4	6	6	5	5	6	6
Herbalife Gran Canaria	8	5	9	12	10	8	5	3	3	5	4	3	5	5	4	4	4	5	5	3	6	7	5	7	6	6	6	6	7	7	7	7	7	7
Blu:sens Monbús	9	6	4	6	5	9	11	10	10	11	10	10	10	10	10	8	9	9	10	10	9	10	9	9	11	8	8	8	8	8	8	10	9	8
Unicaja	15	11	8	5	3	7	4	9	9	9	9	9	9	7	9	10	10	11	11	11	12	11	10	10	9	9	9	9	9	9	9	8	8	9
CB Canarias	14	16	16	17	18	18	14	14	14	14	14	14	14	14	14	12	14	12	14	13	13	13	13	14	12	12	12	12	11	11	11	9	10	10
FIATC Mutua Joventut	2	8	5	9	9	6	9	12	12	10	12	12	11	11	11	11	11	10	9	9	10	9	11	11	8	10	11	11	12	10	10	11	12	11
Asefa Estudiantes	4	4	2	3	2	4	8	7	8	7	8	8	8	9	8	9	8	8	8	8	8	8	8	8	10	11	10	10	10	12	12	12	11	12
UCAM Murcia	3	7	12	11	12	13	13	13	13	13	13	13	13	13	12	13	12	14	12	12	11	12	12	12	13	13	14	14	16	13	14	14	13	13
Mad-Croc Fuenlabrada	18	18	17	18	14	15	16	16	15	15	15	15	15	15	16	16	16	16	16	16	16	16	16	16	17	16	16	16	14	14	15	15	16	14
Cajasol	16	17	18	14	15	16	17	17	18	18	16	16	16	16	15	15	15	13	13	15	15	14	14	13	15	15	15	15	13	15	16	16	14	15
Blancos de Rueda Valladolid	7	12	13	13	13	12	12	11	11	12	11	11	12	12	13	14	13	15	15	14	14	15	15	15	14	14	13	13	15	16	13	13	15	16
Lagun Aro GBC	17	15	15	16	16	14	15	15	16	16	17	17	17	18	18	18	17	18	18	18	18	18	17	17	16	17	17	17	17	17	17	17	17	17
La Bruixa d'Or	10	14	14	15	17	17	18	18	17	17	18	18	18	17	17	17	18	17	17	17	17	17	18	18	18	18	18	18	18	18	18	18	18	18

=== Results ===
	ASE	BRV	OBR	CAI	CAJ	CBC	FCB	CJB	GCA	MAN	LAB	GBC	MCF	RMB	UCM	UNI	UBB	VBC
Asefa Estudiantes		77–80	89–66	68–83	76–46	101–86	88–66	77–112	83–75	90–75	68–72	79–77	70–74	74–87	94–85	82–68	79–88	85–82
Blancos de Rueda Valladolid	86–81		79–93	93–88	88–84	76–92	82–88	69–67	73–84	86–73	71–93	76–61	102–104	75–100	91–57	84–89	70–76	74–66
Blu:sens Monbús	82–71	89–56		72–64	82–61	71–68	81–86	79–82	76–78	83–78	84–70	71–68	73–79	87–97	69–73	65–69	79–73	74–80
CAI Zaragoza	77–82	99–86	76–58		86–55	81–67	50–65	77–57	69–53	89–62	88–75	86–74	79–74	75–84	108–74	82–64	81–74	76–62
Cajasol	86–78	94–57	63–71	67–75		68–79	72–91	87–80	74–63	67–60	82–86	73–57	68–76	63–71	77–93	61–77	60–81	73–82
CB Canarias	84–79	74–68	84–77	65–85	77–68		81–89	71–68	71–76	81–78	99–94	93–78	81–71	86–88	80–68	97–92	104–101	69–73
FC Barcelona Regal	78–65	71–78	54–62	89–81	78–64	100–75		80–59	70–73	89–47	67–69	98–50	72–70	96–89	87–68	57–50	87–85	94–62
FIATC Mutua Joventut	96–75	84–89	89–87	59–71	84–82	92–81	63–78		97–89	83–71	89–79	89–73	86–92	64–85	92–70	79–71	70–81	74–92
Herbalife Gran Canaria	72–64	78–62	70–72	74–56	66–49	78–70	81–69	80–50		65–75	64–80	66–59	73–52	74–76	68–78	70–63	65–59	65–79
La Bruixa d'Or	98–89	81–83	83–69	75–82	76–92	86–93	76–88	88–92	64–80		95–101	88–89	74–66	84–97	103–100	63–80	82–79	86–87
Laboral Kutxa	80–90	84–80	68–77	74–73	90–70	81–62	80–69	92–76	85–74	81–70		88–80	84–77	92–100	87–83	90–79	81–80	79–75
Lagun Aro GBC	71–83	94–78	73–77	79–70	75–77	89–77	89–90	67–73	72–94	94–90	69–71		75–86	71–85	86–78	54–67	65–72	76–68
Mad-Croc Fuenlabrada	70–63	84–74	71–79	57–80	82–78	65–73	76–79	80–82	66–99	73–51	83–86	72–86		65–88	75–81	58–73	83–86	72–69
Real Madrid	93–82	87–75	61–64	94–79	84–74	83–96	78–65	88–77	90–54	104–70	83–81	100–67	100–79		86–69	79–64	98–84	87–84
UCAM Murcia	68–91	87–81	83–77	77–75	73–81	111–108	62–79	79–80	97–99	95–80	95–98	77–75	87–79	64–79		76–68	77–80	77–78
Unicaja	74–85	79–55	70–76	68–88	70–81	88–67	71–69	73–71	67–65	88–70	93–72	74–70	69–64	67–91	85–58		63–59	79–73
Uxúe Bilbao Basket	86–85	87–81	81–70	100–90	76–79	78–70	78–77	80–62	81–70	83–63	75–93	91–72	82–90	74–94	98–75	82–65		61–72
Valencia Basket	81–71	93–86	68–64	83–73	66–72	105–85	81–78	107–75	68–56	90–59	75–79	93–65	93–65	88–79	94–96	82–64	113–111	

== Playoffs ==
Quarter Finals
1	Real Madrid	2
8	Blu:sens Monbús	0
4	Valencia Basket	1
5	CAI Zaragoza	2
2	Laboral Kutxa	1
7	Herbalife Gran Canaria	2
3	FC Barcelona Regal	2
6	Uxúe Bilbao Basket	1

Semifinals
1	Real Madrid	3
5	CAI Zaragoza	0
3	FC Barcelona Regal	3
7	Herbalife Gran Canaria	0

Finals
1	Real Madrid	3
3	FC Barcelona Regal	2

== Statistical leaders ==
=== Index ===
Rank	Name	Team	Total	Games	PIR
1.	(Spain) Nacho Martín	Blancos de Rueda Valladolid	618	34	18.2
2.	(Spain) Germán Gabriel	Asefa Estudiantes	509	30	17.0
3.	(United States) Justin Doellman	Valencia Bàsquet	558	33	16.9
4.	(Spain) Nikola Mirotić	Real Madrid	536	33	16.2
5.	(Netherlands) Henk Norel	CAI Zaragoza	511	32	16.0

=== Points ===
Rank	Name	Team	Total	Games	PPG
1.	(Canada) Carl English	Asefa Estudiantes	446	26	17.2
2.	(Dominican Republic) James Feldeine	Mad-Croc Fuenlabrada	542	34	15.9
3.	(United States) Justin Doellman	Valencia Bàsquet	518	33	15.7
4.	(Spain) Nacho Martín	Blancos de Rueda Valladolid	529	34	15.6
5.	(United States) Troy DeVries	La Bruixa d'Or	524	34	15.4

=== Rebounds ===
Rank	Name	Team	Total	Games	RPG
1.	(Spain) Nacho Martín	Blancos de Rueda Valladolid	240	34	7.06
2.	(Croatia) Ante Tomić	FC Barcelona Regal	224	34	6.59
3	(United States) Spencer Nelson	Herbalife Gran Canaria	207	32	6.47
4.	(United States) Marcus Lewis	UCAM Murcia	203	33	6.15
5.	(United States) Jakim Donaldson	CB Canarias	205	34	6.03

=== Assists ===
Rank	Name	Team	Total	Games	APG
1.	(Puerto Rico) Andrés Rodríguez	Blu:sens Monbús	170	29	5.86
2.	(Czech Republic) Tomáš Satoranský	Cajasol	140	33	4.24
3.	(Spain) Ricardo Úriz	CB Canarias	141	34	4.15
4.	(Spain) Sergio Rodríguez	Real Madrid	136	34	4.00
5.	(Serbia) Stefan Marković	Valencia Basket	117	31	3.77

== Awards ==
=== Regular season MVP ===
- Nikola Mirotić – Real Madrid

=== All-ACB team ===
Position	Player	Team
PG	(Spain) Sergio Rodríguez	Real Madrid
SG	(Spain) Rudy Fernández	Real Madrid
SF	(Argentina) Andrés Nocioni	Laboral Kutxa
PF	(Spain) Nikola Mirotić	Real Madrid
C	(Croatia) Ante Tomić	FC Barcelona Regal

=== ACB Rising Star Award ===
- Salah Mejri – Blusens Monbús

=== Best Coach ===
- Pablo Laso - Real Madrid

=== Player of the Week ===
Date	Player	Team	PIR
1	(Dominican Republic) Manny Quezada (Bosnia and Herzegovina) Nedžad Sinanović	FIATC Joventut; Blancos de Rueda Valladolid	31
2	(Spain) Nikola Mirotić	Real Madrid	46
3	(Canada) Carl English	Asefa Estudiantes	37
4	(Canada) Levon Kendall	Blu:sens Monbús	30
5	(Argentina) Leo Mainoldi	Mad-Croc Fuenlabrada	32
6	(United States) Othello Hunter	Blancos de Rueda Valladolid	31
7	(Argentina) Andrés Nocioni	Laboral Kutxa	26
8	(United States) Ryan Toolson	Herbalife Gran Canaria	33
9	(Canada) Carl English (2) (Brazil) Marcelinho Huertas	Asefa Estudiantes; FC Barcelona Regal	33
10	(Canada) Carl English (3)	Asefa Estudiantes	39
11	(United States) Spencer Nelson	Herbalife Gran Canaria	35
12	(United States) Spencer Nelson (2)	Herbalife Gran Canaria	28
13	(United States) Lamont Hamilton	Uxúe Bilbao Basket	32
14	(Dominican Republic) Eulis Báez (Spain) José Ángel Antelo	Herbalife Gran Canaria; UCAM Murcia	31
15	(Spain) Juan Carlos Navarro	FC Barcelona Regal	44
16	(Montenegro) Bojan Dubljević	Valencia BC	37
17	(Spain) Nacho Martín	Blancos de Rueda Valladolid	30
18	(Dominican Republic) James Feldeine	Mad-Croc Fuenlabrada	41
19	(Canada) Carl English (4)	Asefa Estudiantes	41
20	(United States) Morris Finley	Lagun Aro GBC	32
21	(Spain) Nikola Mirotić (2)	Real Madrid	34
22	(United States) Troy DeVries	La Bruixa d'Or	35
23	(United States) Tony Gaffney (France) Kim Tillie	FIATC Joventut; UCAM Murcia	29
24	(Brazil) Marcelinho Huertas (2)	FC Barcelona Regal	28
25	(United States) Justin Doellman	Valencia BC	41
26	(United States) Rob Kurz (Tunisia) Salah Mejri	Mad-Croc Fuenlabrada; Blu:sens Monbús	29
27	(Spain) Nacho Martín (2) (Netherlands) Henk Norel	Blancos de Rueda Valladolid; CAI Zaragoza	34
28	(Spain) Tomás Bellas	Herbalife Gran Canaria	38
29	(Montenegro) Bojan Dubljević (2)	Valencia BC	37
30	(Argentina) Nicolás Richotti	CB Canarias	32
31	(Hungary) Ádám Hanga	La Bruixa d'Or	37
32	(United States) Justin Doellman (2)	Valencia BC	35
33	(United States) Marcus Lewis	UCAM Murcia	38
34	(United States) Corey Fisher	FIATC Joventut	30

=== Player of the month ===
Month	Week	Player	Team	PIR	Source
October	1–5	(Spain) Nikola Mirotić	Real Madrid	21.4	Archived 2012-11-01 at the Wayback Machine
November	6–9	(United States) Othello Hunter	Blancos de Rueda Valladolid	21.0	Archived 2012-11-29 at the Wayback Machine
December	10–15	(Spain) Germán Gabriel	Asefa Estudiantes	21.1	Archived 2013-01-03 at the Wayback Machine
January	16–19	(Canada) Carl English	Asefa Estudiantes	22.0	Archived 2013-01-31 at the Wayback Machine
February	20–22	(Croatia) Ante Tomić	FC Barcelona Regal	26.3	Archived 2013-03-01 at the Wayback Machine
March	23–27	(Spain) Nacho Martín	Blancos de Rueda Valladolid	21.8	Archived 2013-04-04 at the Wayback Machine
April	28–31	(Spain) Albert Oliver	FIATC Joventut	25.8	Archived 2013-07-18 at the Wayback Machine
May	32–34	(United States) Justin Doellman	Valencia Basket	23.0	Archived 2013-06-09 at the Wayback Machine

Last updated: 3 May 2013.
Source: ACB

== Attendances in regular season ==
Pos	Team	Total	High	Low	Average	Change
1	Laboral Kutxa	165,749	14,381	7,143	9,750	2.52%
2	Uxúe Bilbao Basket	163,645	10,014	7,830	9,626	11.63%
3	Asefa Estudiantes	153,392	12,123	7,231	9,023	-13.34%
4	Valencia BC	133,700	9,000	6,800	7,865	0.83%
5	CAI Zaragoza	129,650	9,600	6,050	7,626	4.1%
5	Real Madrid	129,318	12,238	5,427	7,607	-3.85%
7	Lagun Aro GBC	108,160	8,180	4,720	6,362	-9.36%
8	Unicaja	105,274	9,000	3,500	6,193	-26.5%
9	UCAM Murcia	96,262	7,068	5,012	5,662	5.73%
10	Blu:sens Monbús	92,030	5,890	5,112	5,414	3.3%
11	FIATC Joventut	88,913	8,275	3,818	5,230	0.58%
12	Mad-Croc Fuenlabrada	86,358	5,700	4,339	5,080	-2.74%
13	Blancos de Rueda Valladolid	83,200	6,200	4,000	4,894	6.69%
14	Herbalife Gran Canaria	79,329	5,133	3,821	4,666	1.3%
15	FC Barcelona Regal	77,538	7,359	2,398	4,561	-0.74%
16	La Bruixa d'Or	72,700	5,000	3,550	4,276	-3.35%
17	CB Canarias	70,666	4,987	3,413	4,157	51.16%^{1}
18	Cajasol	67,750	6,800	2,300	3,985	-26.45%
	League total	1,903,634	14,381	2,300	6,221	−3.8%

Updated to games played on May 16, 2013
Source: Liga ACB
Notes:
1: CB Canarias played previous season in LEB Oro

- Highest attendance:
  - 14,381 at Fernando Buesa Arena (Round 12, Laboral Kutxa 81–80 Uxúe Bilbao Basket)
- Lowest attendance:
  - 2,300 at San Pablo (Round 34, Cajasol 68–76 Mad-Croc Fuenlabrada)
