= 2010–11 LEB Oro season =

- League: LEB Oro
- Sport: Basketball
- Games: 306 (regular season)
- Teams: 18
- TV partner(s): FEB TV, MARCA TV

Regular Season
- Season champions: CB Murcia
- Season MVP: (Spain) Ricardo Guillén
- Top scorer: (Spain) Ricardo Guillén

Playoffs
- Playoffs champions: Blu:sens Monbús
- Playoffs runners-up: Ford Burgos

Copa Príncipe
- Champions: Blu:sens Monbús
- Runners-up: CB Murcia
- Finals MVP: (Spain) Alberto Corbacho

LEB Oro seasons
- ← 2009–10 2011–12 →

The 2010–11 LEB Oro season is the 15th season of the Liga Española de Baloncesto. It's named too Adecco Oro by sponsorship reasons. The 306-game regular season (34 games for each of the 18 teams) began on Friday, October 1, 2010, and will end on Friday, April 15, 2011. The champion of the regular season will be promoted to Liga ACB. The teams between 2nd and 9th position will play a best of 5 games play off, where the winner will be promoted too to the higher division. The teams 16th and 17th will play a best of 5 games play-out where the loser will be relegated to LEB Plata, with the 18th team.

== Competition format ==
=== Eligibility of players ===
All teams must have in their roster:

- A minimum of six eligible players with the Spanish national team.
- A maximum of two non-EU players.
- A maximum of three EU players, which one can be a player from an ACP country.
- If a team has not two non-EU players, it can sign a player of everywhere.

Teams can not sign any player after February 28.

=== Regular season ===
Each team of every division has to play with all the other teams of its division twice, once at home and the other at the opponent's stadium. This means that in Liga LEB the league ends after every team plays 34 games.

Like many other leagues in continental Europe, the Liga LEB takes a winter break once each team has played half its schedule. One feature of the league that may be unusual to North American observers is that the two halves of the season are played in the same order—that is, the order of each team's first-half fixtures is repeated in the second half of the season, with the only difference being the arenas used. This procedure is typical in Europe; it is also used by La Liga in football.

If two or more teams have got the same number of winning games, the criteria of tie-breaking are these:

1. Head-to-head winning games.
2. Head-to-head points difference.
3. Total points difference.

At the final of the season:

- The regular season winner promotes directly to Liga ACB.
- Teams qualified between 2nd and 9th, will join the promotion play-offs to ACB.
- Teams qualified in 16th and 17th will play a relegation play-out to LEB Plata.
- Team qualified in 18th position is relegated directly to LEB Plata.

== Team information ==
CB Murcia and Xacobeo Blu:sens were directly relegated from ACB after finishing in the bottom two places and they will substitute CAI Zaragoza (champion) and ViveMenorca.

CB Cornellà and Ciudad de Vigo Básquet left the league after finishing in 17th and 18th position. Also, CB Cornellà lost the play-out with CB Tarragona 2017. Fundación Adepal Alcázar as champion of LEB Plata and Lobe Huesca as LEB Plata play-off winner will enjoy the league.

Tenerife Baloncesto renounced because of a future fusion with CB 1939 Canarias and Bàsquet Mallorca will play LEB Plata after the Spanish Basketball Federation didn't accept their request. CE Lleida Bàsquet and Grupo Iruña Navarra will substitute them.

Team	City	Arena	Capacity	Founded	Starting head coach
UB La Palma	Santa Cruz de La Palma	Multiusos de Santa Cruz de La Palma	4,000	1978	(Spain) Carlos Frade
CB Murcia	Murcia	Palacio de Deportes de Murcia	7,454	1985	(Spain) Luis Guil
Aguas de Sousas Ourense	Ourense	Pazo dos Deportes Paco Paz	5,100	1979	(Spain) Paco García
Leche Río Breogán	Lugo	Pazo Provincial Dos Deportes	6,500	1966	(Spain) Rubén Domínguez
Girona FC	Girona	Palau Girona-Fontajau	5,500	1962	(Spain) Ricard Casas
Isla de Tenerife Canarias	San Cristóbal de La Laguna	Pabellón Insular Santiago Martín	5,100	1991	(Spain) Alejandro Martínez
Blu:sens Monbús	Santiago de Compostela	Pabellón Multiusos Fontes Do Sar	5,206	1970	(Spain) Moncho Fernández
Cáceres Creativa	Cáceres	Multiusos Ciudad de Cáceres	6,500	2007	(Spain) Gustavo Aranzana
Fundación Adepal Alcázar	Alcázar de San Juan	Pabellón Antonio Díaz Miguel	2,000	2006	(Spain) Javier Juárez
CB Tarragona 2017	Tarragona	Pavelló El Serrallo	1,800	1978	(Spain) Berni Álvarez
Baloncesto León	León	Palacio de los Deportes de León	5,300	1981	(Spain) Javier de Grado
Ford Burgos	Burgos	Polideportivo El Plantío	2,432	1997	(Spain) Andreu Casadevall
Palencia Baloncesto	Palencia	Pabellón Marta Domínguez	1,806	1979	(Spain) Natxo Lezkano
Melilla Baloncesto	Melilla	Pabellón Javier Imbroda Ortiz	3,800	1991	(Spain) Gonzalo García
Lobe Huesca	Huesca	Palacio Municipal de Huesca	5,018	1977	(Spain) Ángel Navarro
Grupo Iruña Navarra	Pamplona	Polideportivo Anaitasuna	3,000	2006	(Spain) Ángel Jareño
Clínicas Rincón	Rincón de la Victoria	Torre de Benagalbón	1,500	1988	(Spain) Paco Aurioles
CE Lleida Bàsquet	Lleida	Pavelló Barris Nord	6,100	1997	(Spain) Josep María Raventós

== Managerial changes ==
=== Before the start of the season ===
Team	Outgoing manager	Replaced by	Position in table
Blu:sens Monbús	(Spain) Curro Segura	(Spain) Moncho Fernández	17th (2009–10 ACB)
CB Murcia	(Spain) Edu Torres	(Spain) Luis Guil	18th (2009–10 ACB)
Girona FC	(Spain) Borja Comenge	(Spain) Ricard Casas	9th (2009–10)
UB La Palma	(Spain) Rafa Sanz	(Spain) Carlos Frade	10th (2009–10)
Tarragona 2017	(Spain) Juan Pablo Márquez	(Spain) Berni Álvarez	16th (2009–10)
Grupo Iruña Navarra	(Spain) José María Urabayen	(Spain) Ángel Jareño	5th (2009–10 LEB Plata)
CE Lleida Bàsquet	(Spain) Josep María Torres	(Spain) Josep María Raventós	8th (2009–10 EBA)

=== During the season ===
Team	Outgoing manager	Manner of departure	Date of vacancy	Replaced by	Date of appointment	Position in table
Leche Río Breogán	(Spain) Rubén Domínguez	Sacked	12 December 2010	(Spain) Pepe Rodríguez	14 December 2010	15th (4–9)
Aguas de Sousas Ourense	(Spain) Paco García	Sacked	10 January 2011	(Spain) Rafa Sanz	13 January 2011	18th (3–15)
Clínicas Rincón	(Spain) Paco Aurioles	Signed as Unicaja assistant coach	18 January 2011	(Spain) Paco Alonso	18 January 2011	12th (7–11)
Fundación Adepal Alcázar	(Spain) Javier Juárez	Sacked	18 February 2011	(Spain) Iván Cuesta	18 February 2011	17th (7–15)
Fundación Adepal Alcázar	(Spain) Iván Cuesta	End of tenure as caretaker	21 February 2011	(Spain) Xavi García	21 February 2011	17th (7–16)
Fundación Adepal Alcázar	(Spain) Xavi García	Mutual consent	16 April 2011	(Spain) Josep Maria Izquierdo^{1}	16 April 2011	17th (10–24)

^{1}Josep Maria Izquierdo signed before the relegation playoffs.

== Regular season ==
=== Results ===
Results on FEB.es

=== League table ===
#	Teams	P	W	L	PF	PA	PT	Qualification or relegation
1	CB Murcia	34	30	4	2824	2441	64	Promotion to ACB
2	Blu:sens Monbús (C)	34	28	6	2611	2210	62	Promotion playoffs
3	Ford Burgos	34	26	8	2610	2374	60	Promotion playoffs
4	Girona FC	34	20	14	2656	2537	54	Promotion playoffs
5	Baloncesto León	34	20	14	2596	2580	54	Promotion playoffs
6	Leche Río Breogán	34	18	16	2541	2456	52	Promotion playoffs
7	Isla de Tenerife Canarias	34	18	16	2759	2743	52	Promotion playoffs
8	Grupo Iruña Navarra	34	18	16	2447	2442	52	Promotion playoffs
9	Cáceres Creativa	34	18	16	2574	2643	52	Promotion playoffs
10	UB La Palma^{1}	34	16	18	2660	2626	49	
11	Melilla Baloncesto	34	14	20	2463	2579	48	
12	CE Lleida Bàsquet	34	13	21	2505	2712	47	
13	Tarragona 2017	34	12	22	2582	2738	46	
14	Clínicas Rincón	34	12	22	2471	2577	46	
15	Lobe Huesca	34	12	22	2800	2951	46	
16	Palencia Baloncesto	34	12	22	2461	2575	46	Relegation playoffs
17	Fundación Adepal Alcázar	34	10	24	2326	2589	44	Relegation playoffs
18	Aguas de Sousas Ourense	34	9	25	2465	2578	43	Relegation to LEB Plata

^{1}UB La Palma were docked one point for problems with Chukwudinma Odiakosa's trading in day 1.
(C) means Copa Príncipe Champion.

=== Positions by round ===
Team\Round																																		
	01	02	03	04	05	06	07	08	09	10	11	12	13	14	15	16	17	18	19	20	21	22	23	24	25	26	27	28	29	30	31	32	33	34
CB Murcia	13	7	6	3	3	6	6	3	2	2	2	2	2	2	2	2	2	2	2	2	2	2	2	1	1	1	1	1	2	2	2	1	1	1
Blu:sens Monbús	1	1	1	1	1	1	1	1	1	1	1	1	1	1	1	1	1	1	1	1	1	1	1	2	2	2	2	2	1	1	1	2	2	2
Ford Burgos	4	6	4	8	6	5	5	4	6	6	5	4	3	4	3	3	3	4	3	3	3	3	3	3	3	3	3	3	3	3	3	3	3	3
Girona FC	17	12	13	14	9	11	9	7	9	7	9	9	9	7	8	10	8	10	8	10	10	8	6	9	6	9	7	8	7	7	5	5	4	4
Baloncesto León	3	2	2	2	2	2	2	2	3	3	3	3	4	3	4	4	4	5	4	4	4	5	5	5	5	5	4	4	4	4	4	4	5	5
Leche Río Breogán	6	9	5	10	11	13	13	15	15	15	15	15	15	13	12	12	12	11	13	11	12	11	11	11	11	11	11	10	10	9	9	7	7	6
Isla de Tenerife Canarias	15	11	14	11	12	10	11	14	14	14	14	14	11	8	7	7	7	7	6	6	6	6	8	7	7	6	8	6	5	6	6	6	6	7
Grupo Iruña Navarra	5	5	9	5	8	8	10	8	7	8	7	6	6	5	6	6	6	6	7	7	9	10	10	10	10	8	6	7	8	8	7	8	8	8
Cáceres Creativa	2	3	3	6	4	3	3	5	4	4	4	5	5	6	5	5	5	3	5	5	5	4	4	4	4	4	5	5	6	5	8	9	9	9
UB La Palma	18*	13	10	7	5	4	4	6	5	5	6	7	8	10	11	9	11	14	12	13	11	13	13	12	13	13	14	13	12	12	12	11	10	10
Melilla Baloncesto	9	8	8	4	7	9	8	10	8	9	8	8	7	9	10	8	10	8	10	9	8	9	7	6	8	7	9	9	9	10	10	10	11	11
CE Lleida Bàsquet	16	18	12	15	13	7	7	9	10	10	12	11	12	11	9	11	9	9	9	8	7	7	9	8	9	10	10	11	11	11	11	12	12	12
Tarragona 2017	12	14	17	17	17	15	18	18	18	18	16	17	17	17	15	16	15	15	15	15	15	16	15	16	14	15	12	12	13	13	13	13	13	13
Clínicas Rincón	8	4	7	9	10	12	12	11	11	12	13	10	13	14	14	13	13	12	11	12	13	12	12	13	12	12	13	14	15	14	14	14	14	14
Lobe Huesca	14	17	18	18	18	18	14	12	12	11	10	12	14	15	16	17	17	16	16	16	16	17	16	17	17	17	15	15	14	15	15	15	15	15
Palencia Baloncesto	10	16	16	16	15	17	17	17	16	17	18	16	16	16	17	15	16	17	17	17	17	14	14	14	15	14	17	16	16	16	16	16	16	16
Fundación Adepal	7	10	11	12	14	14	15	13	13	13	11	13	10	12	13	14	14	13	14	14	14	15	17	15	16	16	16	17	17	17	17	17	17	17
Aguas de Sousas Ourense	11	15	15	13	16	16	16	16	17	16	17	18	18	18	18	18	18	18	18	18	18	18	18	18	18	18	18	18	18	18	18	18	18	18

- UB La Palma with one point deducted.

== Copa Príncipe de Asturias ==
At the half of the league, the two first teams in the table play the Copa Príncipe de Asturias at home of the winner of the first half season (17th round). The Champion of this Cup will play the play-offs as first qualified if it finishes the league between the 2nd and the 5th qualified. The Copa Príncipe will be played on January 30, 2011.

=== Teams qualified ===
#	Teams	P	W	L	PF	PA	PT
1	Blu:sens Monbús	17	15	2	1316	1086	32
2	CB Murcia	17	14	3	1348	1197	31

=== The game ===
30 Jan 2011
19:00 CET

Stats

Blu:sens Monbús	81–78	CB Murcia
Scoring by quarter: 27-27, 16-19, 18-16, 20-16
Pts: Alberto Corbacho, 21; Rebs: Miquel Feliu and Michael Ruffin, 5 Asts: Andrés Rodríguez, 5 PIR: Alberto Corbacho, 21		Pts: Vítor Faverani, 13; Rebs: Juan Ignacio Jasen, 5 Asts: Roberto Morentin and Pedro Rivero, 4 PIR: Taylor Coppenrath and Vítor Faverani, 12
Blu:sens Monbús, champion of the Copa Príncipe de Asturias

Fontes do Sar, Santiago de Compostela
Attendance: 5,100
Referees: Morales, Carpallo, Bravo

== Playoffs ==
=== Promotion playoffs ===
Teams qualified from 2nd to 9th will play the promotion play-off. If the winner of Copa Príncipe is qualified between 2nd and 5th at the final of the Regular Season, it will join the play-offs as 2nd qualified. Three best-of-five series will decide who promotes to ACB.

Quarterfinals
2	Blu:sens Monbús	79	96	72	93	X
9	Cáceres Creativa	78	83	77	73	X
5	Baloncesto León	82	76	73	74	X
6	Leche Río Breogán	69	82	75	76	X
3	Ford Burgos	68	85	58	78	X
8	Grupo Iruña Navarra	63	83	67	65	X
4	Girona FC	74	76	65	65	86
7	Isla Tenerife Canarias	63	73	77	93	83

Semifinals
2	Blu:sens Monbús	84	97	77	X	X
6	Leche Río Breogán	67	67	54	X	X
3	Ford Burgos	73	92	71	X	X
4	Girona FC	72	71	63	X	X

Finals
2	Blu:sens Monbús	60	63	72	75	X
3	Ford Burgos	52	53	76	64	X

Blu:sens Monbús promotes to Liga ACB as second qualified

=== Relegation playoffs ===
The loser of a best-of-five series will be relegated to LEB Plata.

Play-out
16	Palencia Baloncesto	73	66	85	X	X
17	Fundación Adepal Alcázar	56	64	76	X	X

== Stats leaders in regular season ==
=== Points ===
Rk	Name	Team	Games	Points	PPG
1	(Spain) Ricardo Guillén	Isla de Tenerife Canarias	27	516	19.1
2	(Colombia) Juan Palacios	UB La Palma	29	490	16.9
3	(Ghana) Alhaji Mohammed	CE Lleida Bàsquet	33	535	16.2
4	(Austria) Jason Detrick	Melilla Baloncesto	33	518	15.7
5	(United States) Kahiem Seawright	Baloncesto León	34	528	15.5

=== Rebounds ===
Rk	Name	Team	Games	Rebounds	RPG
1	(United States) Curtis Dwyane	CE Lleida Bàsquet	34	314	9.2
2	(Germany) Kiril Wachsmann	Fundación Adepal Alcázar	31	286	9.2
3	(Bosnia and Herzegovina) Nedžad Sinanović	Clínicas Rincón	23	184	8.0
4	(United States) Kahiem Seawright	Baloncesto León	34	261	7.7
5	(Spain) Ricardo Guillén	Isla de Tenerife Canarias	27	197	7.3

=== Assists ===
Rk	Name	Team	Games	Assists	APG
1	(Spain) Juan Alberto Aguilar	Tarragona 2017	34	155	4.6
2	(Puerto Rico) Andrés Rodríguez	Blu:sens Monbús	32	137	4.3
3	(Spain) Albert Sàbat	Isla de Tenerife Canarias	34	143	4.2
4	(Spain) Jorge Jiménez	Melilla Baloncesto	33	115	3.5
5	(Spain) Juanjo Bernabé	Baloncesto León	31	104	3.4

=== Performance Index Rating ===
Rk	Name	Team	Games	Rating	PIR
1	(Spain) Ricardo Guillén	Isla de Tenerife Canarias	27	651	24.1
2	(United States) Kahiem Seawright	Baloncesto León	34	637	18.7
3	(Colombia) Juan Palacios	UB La Palma	29	542	18.7
4	(United States) Ryan Humphrey	Cáceres Creativa	28	493	17.6
5	(Spain) David Navarro	Girona FC	21	369	17.6

=== MVP week by week ===
Day	Name	Team	PIR
1	(Spain) José Ángel Antelo	Cáceres Creativa	30
2	(Spain) Ricardo Guillén	Isla de Tenerife Canarias	49
3	(Puerto Rico) Alex Franklin	Tarragona 2017	35
4	(Spain) Oriol Junyent	Blu:sens Monbús	32
5	(Spain) Carlos Cherry	Cáceres Creativa	33
6	(Spain) Javier Salsón	Lobe Huesca	35
7	(Spain) David Navarro	Girona FC	33
8	(United States) Jason Blair	Grupo Iruña Navarra	35
9	(Spain) Josep Ortega	Girona FC	35
10	(Senegal) Michel Diouf	Tarragona 2017	32
11	(Spain) Lucio Angulo	Cáceres Creativa	38
12	(Spain) Xavi Ventura	Lobe Huesca	38
13	(Germany) Kiril Wachsmann	Fundación Adepal Alcázar	34
14	(United States) Alex Franklin	Tarragona 2017	38
15	(Spain) José Ángel Antelo	Cáceres Creativa	32
16	(Spain) Ricardo Guillén (Colombia) Juan Palacios	Isla de Tenerife Canarias; UB La Palma	33
17	(United States) Kahiem Seawright	Baloncesto León	32
18	(Colombia) Juan Palacios	UB La Palma	36
19	(Ghana) Alhaji Mohamed	CE Lleida Bàsquet	42
20	(United States) Jeff Bonds	Lobe Huesca	40
21	(United States) Tim Frost (Spain) Jorge Jiménez (Spain) Nacho Ordín (Colombia) Juan Palacios	Palencia Baloncesto; Melilla Baloncesto; Girona FC; UB La Palma	26
22	(Spain) Ricardo Guillén	Isla de Tenerife Canarias	32
23	(Brazil) Vítor Faverani (Spain) Roger Fornas	CB Murcia; Tarragona 2017	29
24	(Bosnia and Herzegovina) Nedžad Sinanović	Clínicas Rincón	30
25	(Spain) Jesús Chagoyen	Isla de Tenerife Canarias	36
26	(United States) Kahiem Seawright	Baloncesto León	35
27	(United States) Levi Rost	Girona FC	31
28	(Spain) Oriol Junyent	Blu:sens Monbús	35
29	(Spain) Jesús Chagoyen	Isla de Tenerife Canarias	42
30	(Brazil) Vítor Faverani	CB Murcia	31
31	(Ghana) Alhaji Mohamed	CE Lleida Bàsquet	28
32	(Spain) Jesús Chagoyen	Isla de Tenerife Canarias	34
33	(Spain) Ricardo Guillén	Isla de Tenerife Canarias	36
34	(Spain) Ricardo Guillén	Isla de Tenerife Canarias	35

== Honors ==
=== All LEB Oro team ===
- (Spain) Pedro Rivero (CB Murcia)
- (United States) Levi Rost (Girona FC)
- (United States) Micah Downs (Ford Burgos)
- (Spain) Ricardo Guillén (Isla de Tenerife Canarias)
- (Spain) Oriol Junyent (Blu:sens Monbús)

=== MVP of the regular season ===
- (Spain) Ricardo Guillén (Isla de Tenerife Canarias)

=== Coach of the season ===
- (Spain) Luis Guil (CB Murcia)
