= Moncho Fernández =

Spanish basketball coach (born 1969)

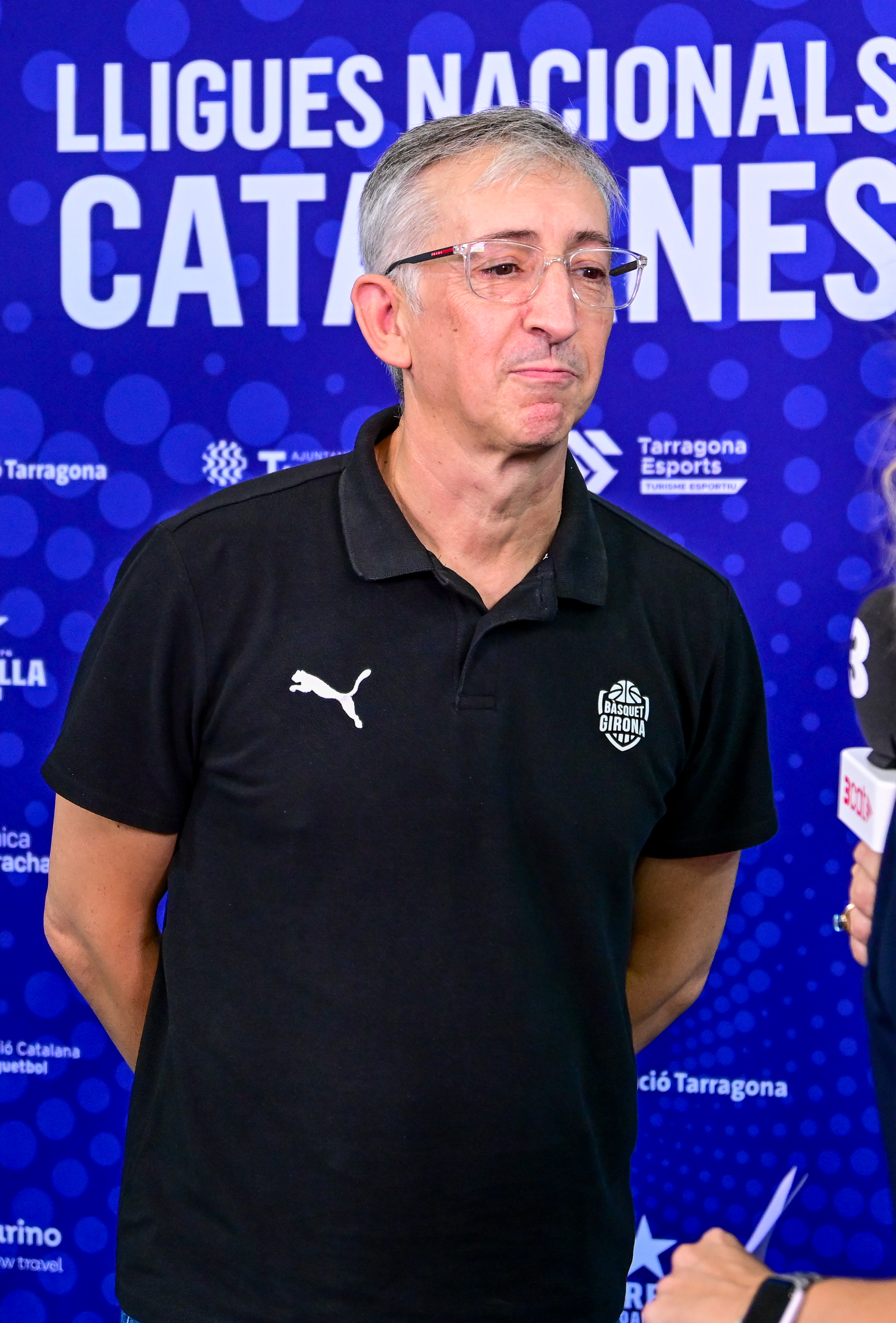
- Fernández with Bàsquet Girona in 2025

Bàsquet Girona
- Position: Head coach
- League: Liga ACB

Personal information
- Born: September 19, 1969 (age 57) Santiago de Compostela, Galicia, Spain
- Coaching career: 2000–present

Career history

Coaching
- 2000–2002: Gijón Baloncesto (assistant)
- 2002–2004: Gijón Baloncesto
- 2004–2006: Breogán (assistant)
- 2006–2009: Villa de Los Barrios
- 2009–2010: Murcia
- 2010–2024: Obradoiro CAB
- 2024–present: Bàsquet Girona

Career highlights
- As head coach: 1× Copa Príncipe champion (2011); 10× Copa Galicia (2010–2017, 2019, 2023); 1× Promotion to Liga ACB (2011); Most number of consecutive seasons in the same Liga ACB team (13 consecutive seasons with Obradoiro CAB)

Ramón Fernández Vidal (born 19 September 1969), known as Moncho Fernández, is a Spanish basketball coach who is the current head coach for Bàsquet Girona of the Liga ACB. He is nicknamed as The Alchemist. He holds the record for the most number of consecutive seasons in the same ACB team, having coached Obradoiro CAB for 13 seasons in Liga ACB. Moncho was the head coach of Obradoiro CAB from 2010 to 2024. He is widely regarded as the best Galician basketball head coach of all time.

== Coaching career ==
Moncho started his coaching career with Moncho López as the assistant coach of Gijón Baloncesto in 2000. After the relegation of the club from Liga ACB in the 2001–02, he took the lead of the club during the next two seasons.

In 2005, Moncho came back to Liga ACB, again as assistant of Moncho López, this time to Leche Río Breogán. He left the club after a new relegation, for joining CB Villa de Los Barrios, of the LEB Oro league, as head coach. He qualified the Andalusians to a LEB Oro Final Four in 2009. Just after being defeated in the semifinals, the club would be dissolved and consequently, Moncho left it.

In 2009, Moncho debuted in ACB with CB Murcia, but he would leave the club in December 2009, after earning only two wins in eleven games.

After one year without managing any team, on 2 July 2010, Moncho signed with his home city team Obradoiro CAB. In his first season, he promoted the Galician team to the Liga ACB after winning the 2011 LEB Oro Playoffs.

He qualified Obradoiro for the 2013 ACB Playoffs, but was eliminated in the first round by Real Madrid.

In 2016, Moncho coached Obradoiro CAB in the Copa del Rey de Baloncesto.

In 2018, Moncho coached Obradoiro CAB in the Supercopa de España de Baloncesto.

In 2023, Moncho coached Obradoiro CAB in the Basketball Champions League.

Moncho left Obradoiro CAB on 16 May 2024.

Moncho became Bàsquet Girona's head coach in December 2024, replacing Fotios Katsikaris when the Catalans found themselves at the bottom of the Liga ACB.

== Head coaching record ==
Legend
G	Games coached	W	Games won	L	Games lost	W–L %	Win-loss %

Note: The EuroLeague is not the only competition in which the team played during the season. He also coached in domestic competition, and regional competition if applicable.

=== Obradoiro CAB ===
Team	Year	G	W	L	W–L%	Result
Obradoiro CAB	2010–11	34	28	6	.824	2nd in LEB Oro
Obradoiro CAB	2011–12	34	13	21	.382	13th in Liga Endesa
Obradoiro CAB	2012–13	34	18	16	.529	8th in Liga Endesa
Obradoiro CAB	2013–14	34	13	21	.382	12th in Liga Endesa
Obradoiro CAB	2014–15	34	15	19	.441	12th in Liga Endesa
Obradoiro CAB	2015–16	34	10	24	.294	15th in Liga Endesa
Obradoiro CAB	2016–17	32	11	21	.344	13th in Liga Endesa
Obradoiro CAB	2017–18	34	14	20	.412	12th in Liga Endesa
Obradoiro CAB	2018–19	34	11	23	.324	15th in Liga Endesa
Obradoiro CAB	2019–20	23	9	14	.391	14th in Liga Endesa
Obradoiro CAB	2020–21	36	12	24	.333	14th in Liga Endesa
Obradoiro CAB	2021–22	34	12	22	.353	15th in Liga Endesa
Obradoiro CAB	2022–23	34	14	20	.412	11th in Liga Endesa
Obradoiro CAB	2023–24	34	11	23	.324	17th in Liga Endesa
Career		467	191	276	.409	

== Honours ==
- Copa Príncipe de Asturias: (1)
  - 2011
- Copa Galicia: (10)
  - 2010, 2011, 2012, 2013, 2014, 2015, 2016, 2017, 2019 and 2023.
- Promotion to Liga ACB: (1)
  - 2011
- Most number of consecutive seasons in the same Liga ACB team
  - 13 consecutive seasons with Obradoiro CAB

== See also ==
- Obradoiro CAB
