= CDB Amistad y Deporte =

- Leagues: LEB Oro
- Founded: 2006
- Dissolved: 2011
- History: Fundación Adepal Alcázar (2006-11)
- Arena: Polideportivo Antonio Díaz Miguel
- Location: Alcázar de San Juan, Spain
- Team colors: Blue and white
- President: Juan Andrés García Peña
- Championships: 1 LEB Plata Championship; 1 Liga EBA Championship
- Website: www.adepal.es
Home	Away

CDB Deporte y Amistad, more known as Fundación Adepal Alcázar, is a professional basketball team based in Alcázar de San Juan, Castilla La Mancha. The team played in league LEB Oro during the 2010–11 season. After that season, the club was dissolved.

== Season by season ==
Season	Tier	Division	Pos.	W–L
2006–07	5	1ª División	2nd (Note: Achieved a vacant berth in Liga EBA.)	28–4
2007–08	5	Liga EBA	1st	28–5
2008–09	4	LEB Bronce	9th (Note: Achieved a vacant berth in LEB Plata after the dissolution of the LEB Bronce.)	16–19
2009–10	3	LEB Plata	1st	23–7
2010–11	2	LEB Oro	17th	10–27

== Trophies and awards ==
=== Trophies ===
- LEB Plata: (1)
  - 2010
