= Kahiem Seawright =

American basketball player (born 1986)

Akhisar Belediyespor
- Position: Power forward / center
- League: Turkish Basketball First League

Personal information
- Born: December 17, 1986 (age 39) Uniondale, New York
- Listed height: 6 ft 8 in (2.03 m)
- Listed weight: 230 lb (104 kg)

Career information
- High school: Uniondale (Uniondale, New York)
- College: Rhode Island (2005–2009)
- NBA draft: 2009: undrafted
- Playing career: 2009–present

Career history
- 2009–2010: CB Tarragona
- 2010–2011: Baloncesto León
- 2011–2012: CB Valladolid
- 2011–2012: Trotamundos de Carabobo
- 2012–2013: Gimnasia Indalo
- 2013–2017: Büyükçekmece
- 2018–2019: Hapoel Afula
- 2019–2020: Akhisar Belediyespor

Kahiem Seawright (born December 17, 1986) is an American professional basketball player for Akhisar Belediyespor of the Turkish Basketball First League. He played college basketball for University of Rhode Island.

== Career ==
Seawright played for Rhode Island Rams from 2005 to 2009, in the Atlantic 10 Conference of the Division I (NCAA).

After this time at the NCAA, started his professional career on 2009 at CB Tarragona, team of the LEB Oro, Spanish second league. One season later, signs for Baloncesto León, and becomes the most valuated foreign player of that league.

On 2011, signs for CB Valladolid and debuts at the top Spanish basketball league, the Liga ACB.

On August 8, 2018, Seawright signed a one-year deal with the Israeli team Hapoel Afula of the Israeli National League. In 23 games played for Afula, he averaged a double-double of 18.2 points and 11.2 rebounds per game.

On August 15, 2019, he has signed with Akhisar Belediyespor of the Turkish Basketball First League.
