= Alberto Corbacho =

Spanish basketball player

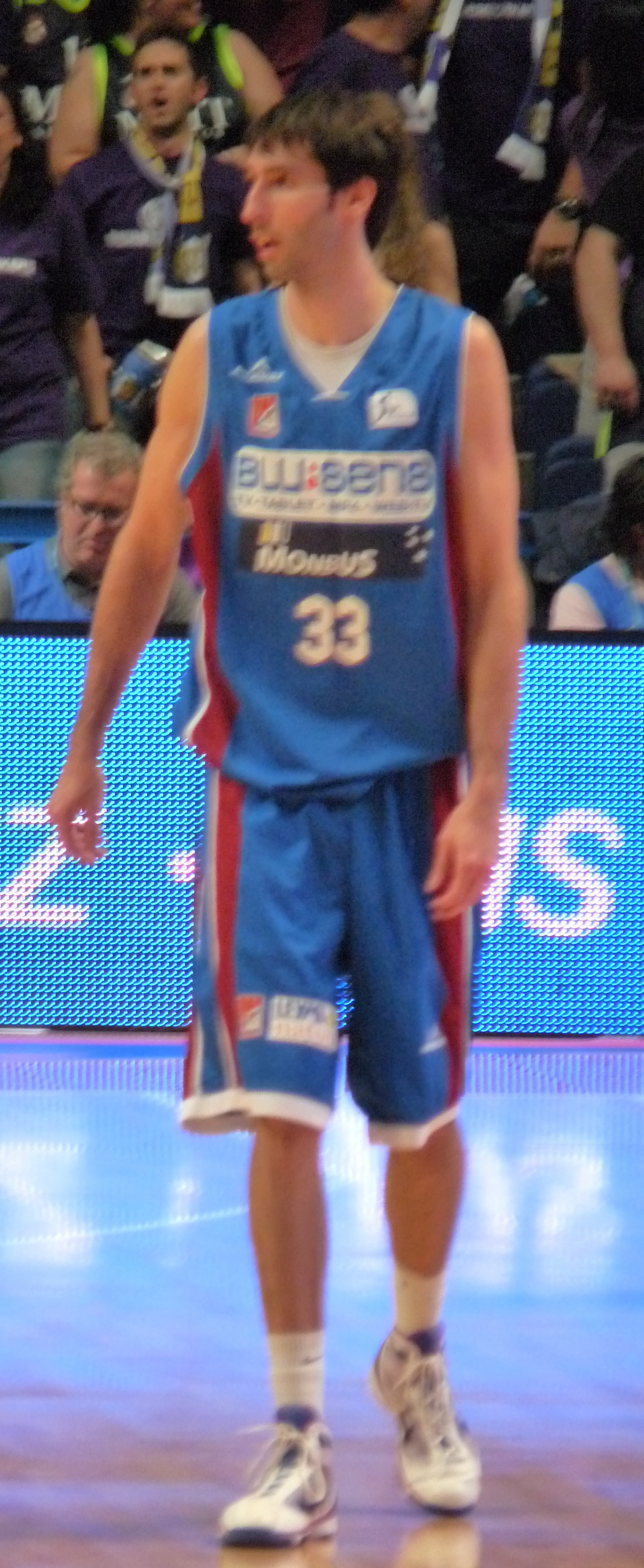
- Corbacho, while playing with Obradoiro.

Free agent
- Position: Shooting guard / small forward

Personal information
- Born: October 1, 1984 (age 42) Palma, Spain
- Listed height: 6 ft 7 in (2.01 m)
- Listed weight: 214 lb (97 kg)

Career information
- NBA draft: 2006: undrafted
- Playing career: 2002–present

Career history
- 2002–2003: Bàsquet Muro
- 2002–2003: Mesón Can Pedro
- 2003–2004: Unicaja B
- 2004–2006: Ciudad de Huelva
- 2006–2007: CAI Zaragoza
- 2007–2008: L'Hospitalet
- 2008–2010: Breogán
- 2010–2015: Obradoiro
- 2015–2016: Baskonia
- 2016–2018: Obradoiro
- 2018–2019: Gipuzkoa Basket
- 2019–2021: CB Menorca
- 2021–Present: CB Culleredo

Career highlights
- 3× Liga ACB Free Throw Percentage leader (2012–2014); Copa Príncipe de Asturias MVP (2011)

Alberto Corbacho de la Cruz (born October 1, 1984) is a Spanish professional basketball player who last played for Delteco GBC of the Liga ACB. Corbacho is considered to be one of the top three-point shooters in the Spanish League.

== Professional career ==
After outstanding as a three-point shooter during several seasons in the second division, the LEB Oro, Corbacho made his debut in the Liga ACB in 2011 with Obradoiro CAB, who promoted from LEB Oro to ACB in the previous season.

Corbacho beat the record of averaging 3 point shots scored for a national player in the Liga ACB during the 2012–13 season, when he averaged 3.2 three-point shots scored per game, with a total of 110 goals.

In 2015, he signed with Euroleague team Saski Baskonia. After playing one season with the Basque squad, he came back to Obradoiro. In its first competitive game after his return to Galicia, Corbacho became injured for six months. In 2018, he signed a one-year deal with Delteco GBC of the Liga ACB.

== Spain national team ==
Corbacho was a member of the Spanish junior national team. He played with Spain's junior national team at the 2004 FIBA Europe Under-20 Championship. He has also played with the senior men's Spain national basketball team.

== Awards and accomplishments ==
- Copa Príncipe de Asturias Champion: (2010-11)
- Copa Príncipe de Asturias MVP: (2010-11)
