= Javier Bulfoni =

Argentine professional basketball player

Atenas de Córdoba
- Position: Shooting guard
- League: Liga Nacional de Básquet

Personal information
- Born: 26 September 1976 (age 50) Casilda, Santa Fe, Argentina
- Listed height: 6 ft 4 in (1.93 m)
- Listed weight: 205 lb (93 kg)

Career information
- Playing career: 1999–present

Career history
- 1999–2002: Gimnasia y Esgrima La Plata (Argentina)
- 2002–2004: Drac Inca Mallorca (Spain)
- 2004–2005: CB Ciudad de Algeciras (Spain)
- 2005–2008: León Caja España (Spain)
- 2008–2009: Ricoh Manresa (Spain)
- 2009–2011: Xacobeo Blu:sens (Spain)
- 2012–present: Atenas de Córdoba (Argentina)
Medals
Representing Argentina
Men's Basketball
Pan American Games
Bronze medal – third place	2007 Rio de Janeiro

Javier Bulfoni (born 26 September 1976 in Buenos Aires) is an Argentine professional basketball player, currently playing for Obradoiro CAB of the LEB Oro league. After playing professionally for three years in Argentina, Javier went to Spain.

== Career ==
- 1999-02 (Argentina) Club de Gimnasia y Esgrima La Plata
- 2002-04 (Spain) Drac Inca (LEB Oro)
- 2004-05 (Spain) Algeciras (LEB Oro)
- 2005-08 (Spain) Grupo Begar León (07/08 season in ACB)
- 2008-09 (Spain) Suzuki Manresa (ACB)
- 2009-11 (Spain) Obradoiro CAB (09/10 season in ACB)
- 2012-13 (Argentina) Atenas de Córdoba (LNB)
