= Levon Kendall =

Canadian professional basketball player

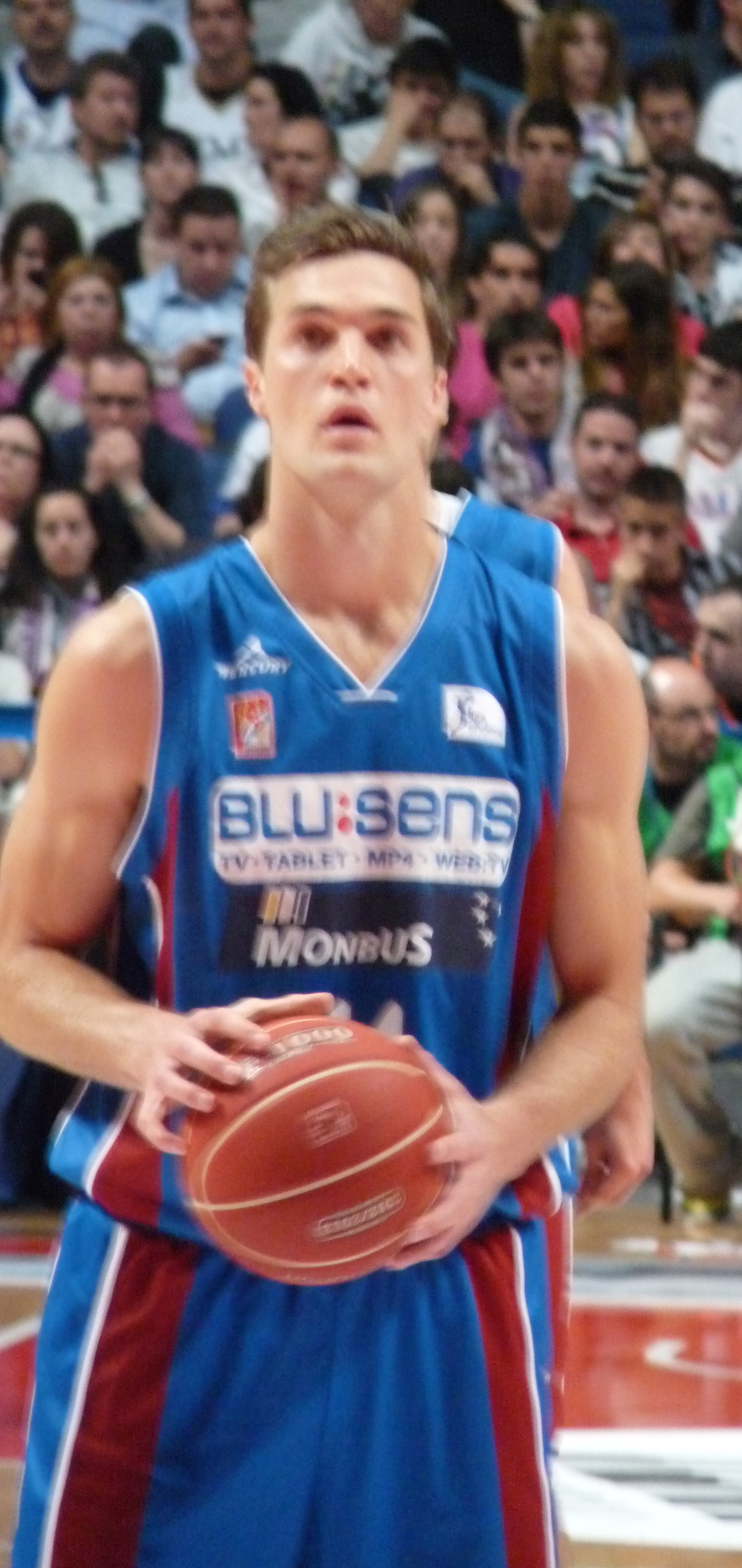
- Levon Kendall, Obradoiro CAB.

Personal information
- Born: July 4, 1984 (age 42) Vancouver, British Columbia
- Listed height: 6 ft 10.25 in (2.09 m)
- Listed weight: 240 lb (109 kg)

Career information
- High school: Kitsilano (Vancouver, British Columbia)
- College: Pittsburgh (2003–2007)
- NBA draft: 2007: undrafted
- Playing career: 2007–2021

Career history
- 2007–2009: Panionios
- 2009–2010: Maroussi
- 2010–2013: Obradoiro CAB
- 2013–2014: Alba Berlin
- 2014–2015: Gran Canaria
- 2016: Brujos de Guayama
- 2016: Estudiantes
- 2019, 2021: Fraser Valley Bandits

Career highlights
- Copa Príncipe de Asturias winner (2011); No. 14 retired by Vancouver Bandits
Medals
Men's basketball
Representing Canada
FIBA U21 World Cup
Bronze medal – third place	2005 Mar del Plata

Levon Maxwell Simon Kendall (born July 4, 1984) is a Canadian former professional basketball player. He played at both power forward and center. He is 2.09 m (6 ft 10 ¼ in) in height. His father is the Canadian rock musician and composer Simon Kendall.

== High school ==
Kendall led his Kitsilano Blue Demons high school team to three straight provincial championships under coach Simon Dykstra. Kendall was twice named MVP and was instrumental in leading his team to victory alongside fellow standout Chris Burton.

== College career ==
Kendall played college basketball with the University of Pittsburgh's men's basketball team the Pittsburgh Panthers.

== Professional career ==
In 2007, Kendall joined the pro Greek League club Panionios. In 2009, he moved to the Greek club Maroussi. In 2010, he moved to the ACB League in Spain, in CAB Obradoiro. In August 2013, he signed with German team Alba Berlin.

In 2019, Kendall signed with the Fraser Valley Bandits of the Canadian Elite Basketball League. He re-signed with the club in 2021 for his final professional season.

== National team career ==
Kendall is a member of the Canadian national basketball team. He was a member of the Canadian team that competed at the 2008 FIBA World Olympic Qualifying Tournament and the 2010 FIBA World Championship team.
