= Oriol Junyent =

Spanish basketball player and manager

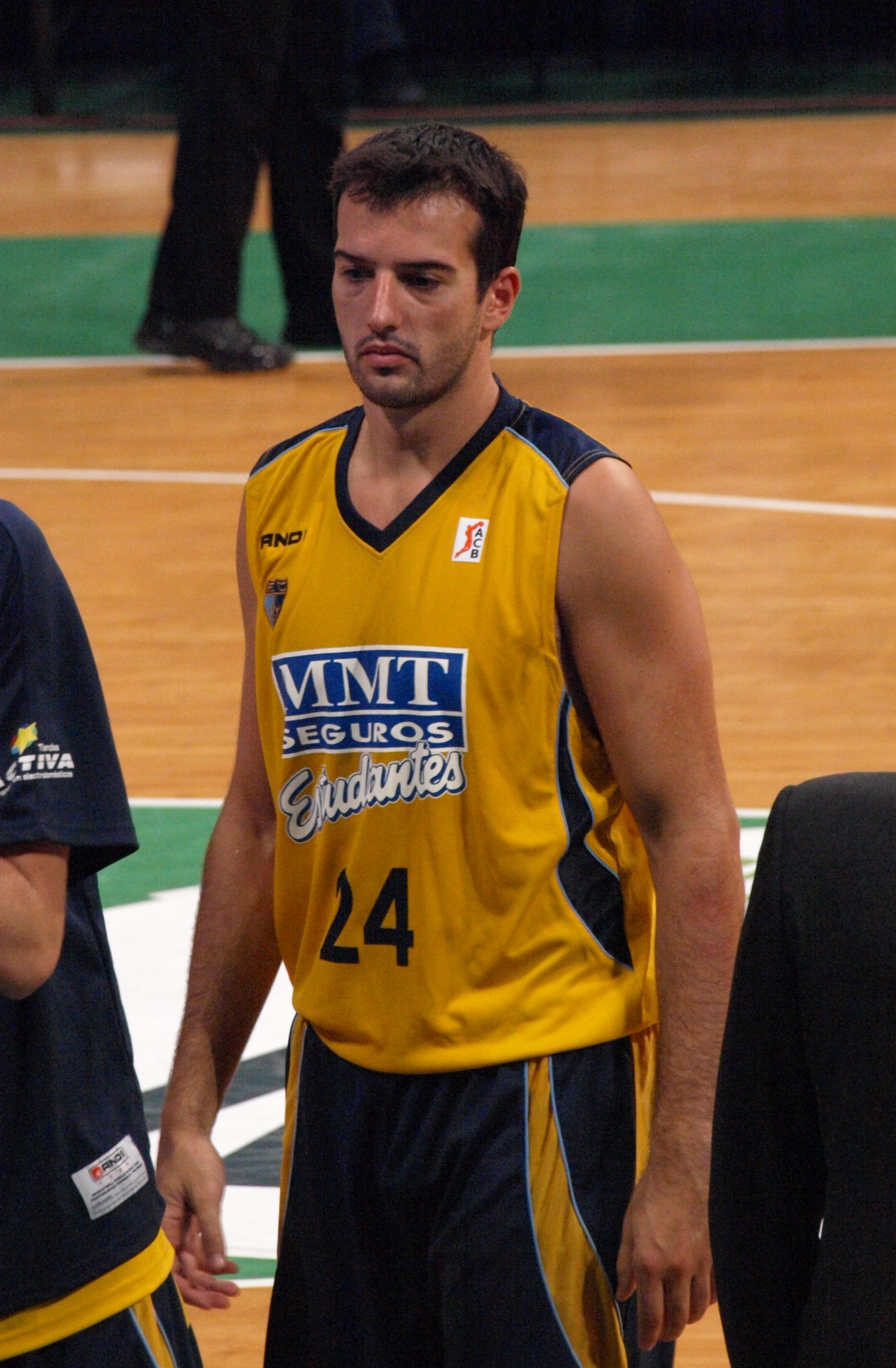
- Oriol Junyent, in a timeout with CB Estudiantes

Obradoiro B
- Title: Head coach
- League: Liga EBA

Personal information
- Born: 1 July 1976 (age 50) Sabadell, Spain
- Listed height: 6 ft 10 in (2.08 m)
- Listed weight: 240 lb (110 kg)

Career information
- Playing career: 1993–2014
- Position: Center
- Coaching career: 2017–present

Career history

Playing
- 1995–1997: CB Cornellà
- 1997–1998: CB Granada
- 1998–1999: FC Barcelona
- 1999–2001: Baloncesto Fuenlabrada
- 2001–2002: CB Granada
- 2002–2006: CB Lucentum Alicante
- 2006–2007: CB Granada
- 2007: CB Ciudad de Huelva
- 2007–2009: CB Estudiantes
- 2009: CB Valladolid
- 2009: Obradoiro CAB
- 2009–2010: CAI Zaragoza
- 2010–2014: Obradoiro CAB

Coaching
- 2017–present: Obradoiro B

Career highlights
- No. 15 retired by Obradoiro CAB; All-LEB Oro Team (2011)

Oriol Junyent Monuera (born 1 July 1976) is a retired professional Spanish basketball player and the current manager of the reserve team of Obradoiro CAB.

== Playing career ==
On the 1998–99 was champion of the Liga ACB and the Korać Cup with FC Barcelona.

On 2009–2010 LEB season was LEB Oro champion with CAI Zaragoza, and one year later, on 2010–2011 LEB Oro season was champion of the Copa Príncipe and runner-up of LEB Oro with Obradoiro CAB. He also finished in the All LEB Oro team.

In June 2014, Junyent suffered an eight-month injury and did not play the 2014–15 ACB season with Obradoiro.

== Coaching career ==
In 2017, Junyent was hired for managing the reserve team of Obradoiro CAB at the fourth division.

== National team ==
Junyent achieved the bronze medal with the Spanish U-19 team at the 1995 FIBA Under-19 World Championship and played also with the Spain national basketball team, playing the 2002 FIBA World Championship.

== Honors ==
=== Trophies ===
- With FC Barcelona
  - Liga ACB: 1999
  - Korać Cup: 1999
- With CAI Zaragoza
  - Liga Española de Baloncesto: 2010
- With Obradoiro CAB
  - Copa Príncipe: 2010

=== Individual awards ===
- With Obradoiro CAB
  - All LEB Oro Team: 2011
