= David Navarro (basketball) =

Spanish basketball player

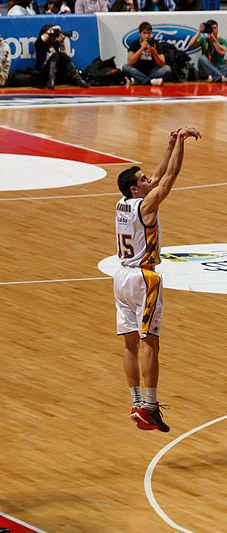

Personal information
- Born: May 17, 1983 (age 43) Esparraguera, Catalonia, Spain
- Listed height: 192 cm (6 ft 4 in)
- Listed weight: 90 kg (198 lb)

Career information
- NBA draft: 2005: undrafted
- Playing career: 2001–2021
- Position: Shooting guard
- Number: 20

Career history
- 2001–2003: Olesa
- 2003–2004: Melilla
- 2004–2005: Rosalía de Castro
- 2005–2006: Bàsquet Manresa
- 2006–2007: Ciudad de Vigo
- 2007–2009: Clavijo
- 2009–2011: Sant Josep Girona
- 2011: Valencia
- 2011–2012: Menorca
- 2012–2013: Valladolid
- 2013–2017: Andorra
- 2017–2020: Obradoiro
- 2020–2021: Ourense

David Navarro Brugal (born 17 May 1983) is a Spanish former professional basketball player. He played for several Liga ACB clubs including Monbus Obradoiro and MoraBanc Andorra.

== Professional career ==
After spending his first years as a professional mainly in Catalonia, Navarro made his debut in Liga ACB in 2005 with Bàsquet Manresa.

He came back to LEB Oro for playing with Sant Josep Girona, before coming back to the top tier with Valencia Basket in February 2011.

In 2013, Navarro agreed terms with River Andorra, where he became captain of the club after several years in the team of the Principality. In his first season, Andorra conquered the title of the 2012–13 LEB Oro season.

On June 28, 2017, Navarro signed a two-year contract with Obradoiro CAB.

== International career ==
After living four years in Andorra, Navarro was declared able to play with the Andorra national team, as a result of a special eligibility rule from FIBA Europe for small countries.

He made his debut in May 2017, at the 2017 Games of the Small States of Europe in San Marino.
