= Micah Downs =

American basketball player

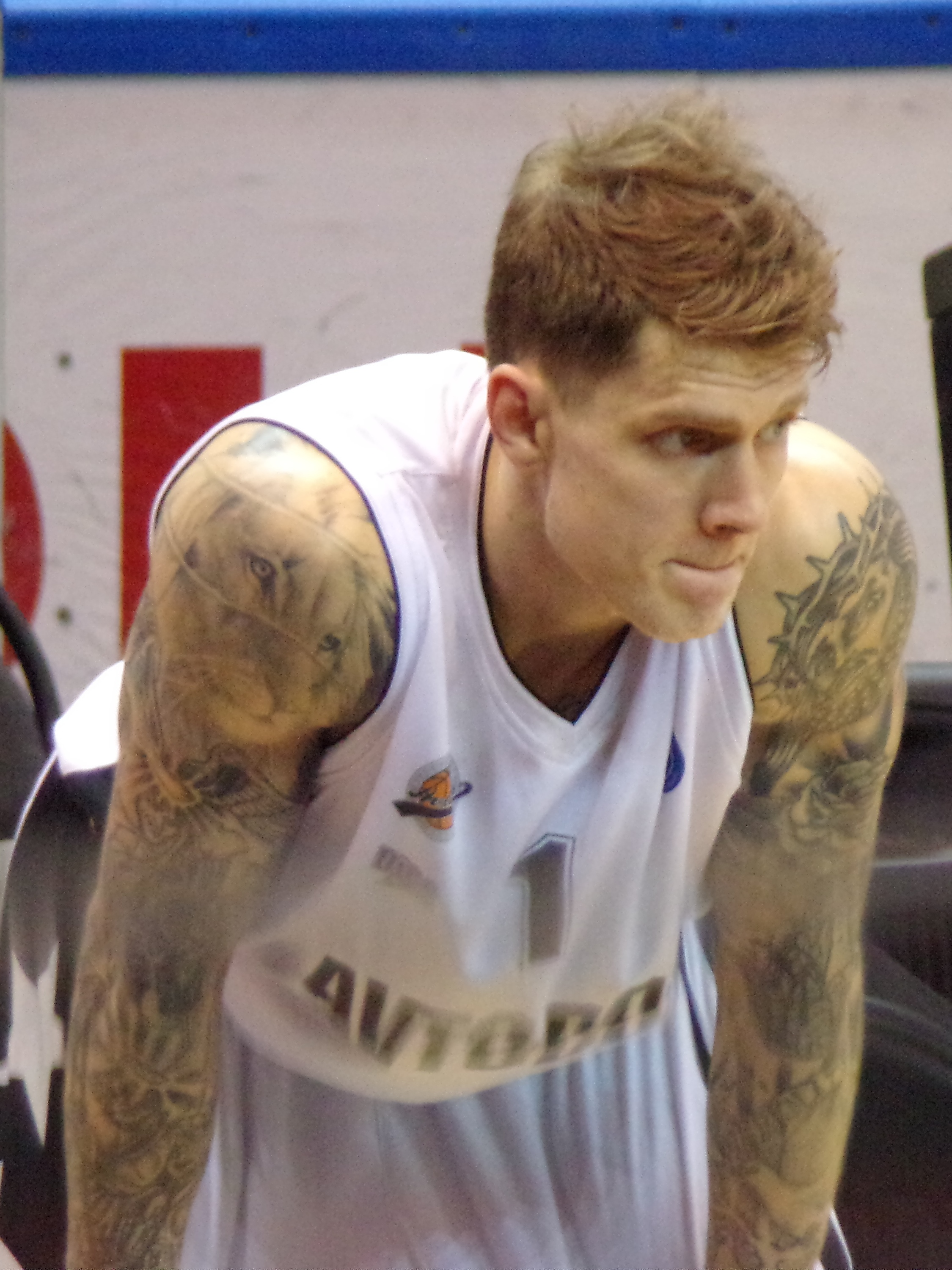
- Downs with Avtodor in 2018

Personal information
- Born: September 8, 1986 (age 39) Kirkland, Washington, US
- Listed height: 6 ft 8 in (2.03 m)
- Listed weight: 201 lb (91 kg)

Career information
- High school: Juanita (Kirkland, Washington)
- College: Kansas (2005–2006); Gonzaga (2006–2009)
- NBA draft: 2009: undrafted
- Playing career: 2009–2024
- Position: Small forward / shooting guard

Career history
- 2009–2010: Zadar
- 2010: Leuven Bears
- 2010–2011: Ford Burgos
- 2011–2012: Manresa
- 2012–2013: Maine Red Claws
- 2013: Bucaneros de La Guaira
- 2013: Budivelnyk
- 2014: Erie BayHawks
- 2014–2015: Avtodor
- 2015–2016: Juvecaserta
- 2016–2017: Orléans
- 2017–2018: BC Avtodor
- 2018–2020: Benfica
- 2020: s.Oliver Würzburg
- 2021–2022: Sporting CP
- 2022–2023: F.C. Barreirense
- 2023: Portimonense
- 2024: S.C. Olhanense

Career highlights
- Portuguese Cup winner (2022); Portuguese League Cup winner (2022); All-VTB United League Second Team (2015); Ukrainian League champion (2013); NBA Development League All-Star (2013); ACB Rising Star Award (2012); WCC tournament MVP (2009); Fourth-team Parade All-American (2005); McDonald's All-American (2005)

Micah Philip Downs (born September 8, 1986) is an American former professional basketball player. He spent most of his career playing overseas, most notably in the Liga ACB, the LNB Élite, the VTB United League, and the Liga Portuguesa de Basquetebol.

== College career ==
Downs is a former small forward for the Kansas Jayhawks, later transferring and graduating from Gonzaga University. Downs was a member of the West Coast Conference (WCC) All-Tournament Team in 2007 and 2009; in 2009 he was also the WCC All-Tournament MVP.

== Professional career ==
After going undrafted in the 2009 NBA draft, Downs participated in the 2009 Las Vegas NBA Summer League as a member of the Phoenix Suns. In his first pro year in Croatia playing for KK Zadar, Downs averaged 7.6 points per game (ppg) in the NLB League and 11.0 ppg in the Eurocup, while averaging over 50% field goal shooting. After moving to the Leuven Bears Downs averaged 12.4 points, 3.6 rebounds, and 1.3 assists per game.

In the 2010–11 season Downs played for Ford Burgos of the LEB Oro. He finished in the All-LEB Oro team. Downs participated in the 2010 Las Vegas NBA Summer League as a member of the Milwaukee Bucks.

In July 2011, Downs agreed to terms with Assignia Manresa, and averaged 13.4 ppg and 4 rebounds per game. After his first season at Liga ACB, Downs won the ACB Rising Star Award.

On November 1, 2012, Downs signed with the Maine Red Claws of the NBA D-League. On February 4, 2013, Downs was named to the Futures All-Star roster for the 2013 NBA D-League All-Star Game. He left the Red Claws in April 2013.

On July 11, 2013, Downs signed a one-year deal with Budivelnyk Kyiv. On November 26, 2013, he parted ways with them. On January 17, 2014, he was acquired by the Erie BayHawks.

On July 24, 2014, he signed a one-year deal with Avtodor Saratov of Russia. On July 28, 2015, he signed with Juvecaserta Basket of Italy for the 2015–16 season.

On June 23, 2016, Downs signed with the French Pro A club Orléans Loiret Basket for the 2016–17 Pro A season.

On May 22, 2017, Downs returned to his former club Avtodor Saratov.

On September 19, 2018, Downs joined Portuguese Basketball League club S.L. Benfica. He averaged 12.6 points and 5.3 rebounds per game during the 2019–20 season. On October 13, 2020, Downs signed a two-month deal with s.Oliver Würzburg of the Basketball Bundesliga as a replacement for the injured Brekkott Chapman.

On January 20, 2021, Downs signed with Sporting Clube de Portugal of the Liga Portuguesa de Basquetebol. He re-signed with the team on July 14.

On October 21, 2022, Downs signed with FC Barreirense of Proliga.
