= Obradoiro CAB =

- Nickname: Obra, O equipo de Galicia, O orgullo de Galicia
- Leagues: Liga ACB
- Founded: 1970; 56 years ago
- History: Obradoiro CAB (1970–present)
- Arena: Fontes do Sar
- Capacity: 6,666
- Location: Santiago de Compostela, Galicia
- Team colors: White, Royal Blue, Maroon
- Main sponsor: Monbus
- President: Raúl López López
- General manager: Héctor Galán Rodríguez
- Head coach: Diego Epifanio
- Team captain: Sergi Quintela
- Ownership: Raúl López López
- Championships: 1 Primera FEB; 1 Copa Príncipe; 1 LEB Oro Playoffs; 10 Copa Galicia
- Retired numbers: 3 (4, 14, 15)
- Website: www.obradoirocab.gal
Home	Away	Third

Obradoiro Clube de Amigos do Baloncesto, S.A.D. (lit, Obradoiro Friends of Basketball Club), also known as Monbus Obradoiro for sponsorship reasons, is a professional basketball team based in Santiago de Compostela, Galicia. The club was founded in 1970 and competes in the Liga ACB.

The team played for the first time in the Spanish top league in 1982. The name of the club is a reference to the historical Praza do Obradoiro.

The current president of the club is Raúl López López. Obradoiro's home arena is Fontes do Sar, an arena with a seating capacity of 6,666 people. Sar has been one of the Top-10 European arenas in attendance and one of the first in relation to the city population.

Well-known former players are : Maxi Kleber, Mike Muscala, Dragan Bender, Salah Mejri, Matt Thomas, Kostas Vasileiadis, Robbie Hummel, Kyle Singler, Marc Jackson, Stéphane Lasme, Shayne Whittington, Milt Palacio, Paul Davis, Maceo Baston, Michael Ruffin, Alberto Corbacho, Levon Kendall, Laurynas Birutis, Andreas Obst, Devon Dotson, Henry Ellenson and Mike Higgins.

== History ==
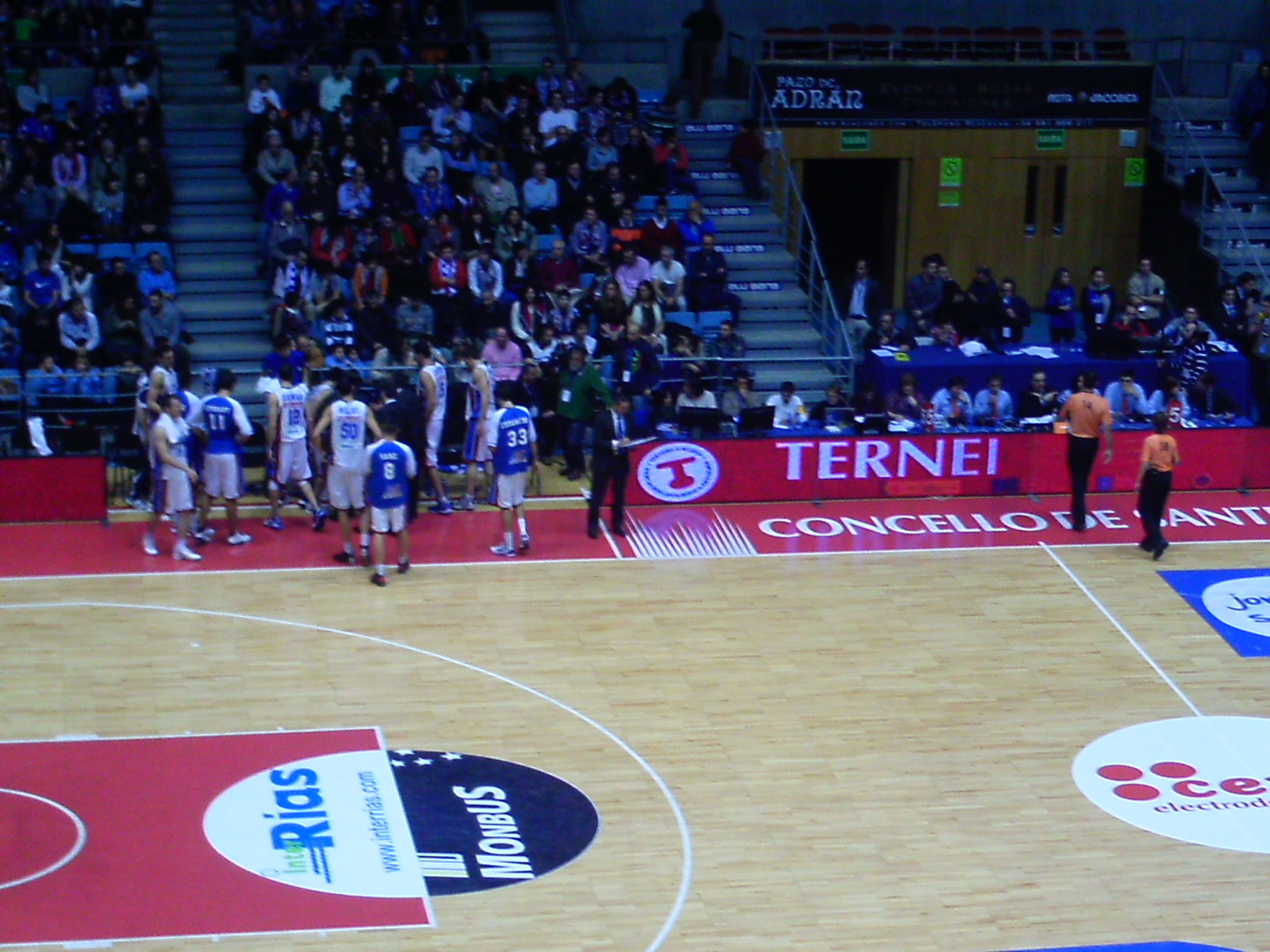
Obradoiro in 2012

Obradoiro CAB was founded in 1970 and started playing in the third division after acquiring the spot of the basketball section of SD Compostela. They were promoted for the first time to the Liga Nacional after finishing in the third position of the 1981–82 Primera División B.

Obradoiro played only the 1982–83 season in the top flight, where it achieved two wins in 26 games.

2009–10 was its returning season to the Spanish top division, Liga ACB, after the Supreme Court conceded that the Júver Murcia committed improper alignment in a matchup in the 1990 promotion playoff. A horrible second half of the league, with one win in 17 matches, caused the relegation to LEB Oro, the second division of Spanish basketball.

In the next season, Obradoiro came back to Liga ACB as the runner-up of the 2010–11 LEB Oro season and also won its first national title: the Copa Príncipe de Asturias.

The 2012–13 ACB season was the best one in the history of the club. Obradoiro CAB finished the regular season in the eight position and joined the playoffs, where it was eliminated in the quarterfinals by the champion Real Madrid. Obradoiro CAB had a highly competitive regular season campaign, closing it out with a 18–16 record. The team capitalized heavily on its home court advantage at Fontes do Sar and pulled off crucial upset victories, including a memorable 62–54 away win against FC Barcelona in December 2012. By finishing 8th, the team secured a historic first-ever entry into the Liga ACB Title Playoffs.

The 2014–15 ACB season was the 45th season in the history of the club, and Obradoiro's 6th season in the Liga ACB, the top-tier professional basketball league in Spain. Led by head coach Moncho Fernández, the Galician team finished the regular season in 12th place with a 15–19 record, comfortably maintaining its status in the top division.

The 2017–18 ACB season was the 48th season in the history of Obradoiro CAB, and its 9th season overall in the Liga ACB. The Galician club completed the regular season in 12th place with a 14–20 record, safely remaining in Spain's premier basketball division. The campaign was punctuated by high-scoring thrillers. Obradoiro achieved a historic club landmark on January 28, 2018, by dominating reigning league champions Valencia Basket 96–77. Obradoiro also featured in the league's highest-scoring game of the season, falling 112–116 in a double-overtime battle against Estudiantes. The stars of the team were Matt Thomas and Artem Pustovyi. Matt Thomas had an exceptional debut year in Europe, establishing himself as one of the top perimeter threats in the league with an average of 15.4 points per game before his later transitions to Valencia Basket and the NBA. Ukrainian center Artem Pustovyi served as the team's defensive pillar, leading the frontcourt in blocks and efficiency.

The 2022–23 ACB season was the 53rd season in the history of Obradoiro CAB, and its 14th season overall in the Liga ACB. Under the continuing management of long-time head coach Moncho Fernández, the Galician team finished the regular season in 11th place with a 14–20 record, safely remaining in Spain's premier division. Obradoiro enjoyed highly competitive hot streaks throughout the year. The defining highlight of their campaign took place on December 3, 2022, when the team pulled off a dramatic 76–74 victory at home over eventual EuroLeague semifinalists FC Barcelona. The stars of the team were Dragan Bender, Kassius Robertson and Thomas Scrubb. Dragan Bender enjoyed a powerful resurgence, averaging 17.2 points and 6.6 rebounds per game, before suffering a season-ending ACL injury in December. Kassius Robertson anchored the perimeter attack, pacing the squad with an outstanding 17.4 points per game and solidifying his place in the top of the league leaderboard. Canadian forward Thomas Scrubb served as the iron man of the lineup, playing all 34 games and chipping in 11.6 points and 5.5 rebounds per contest. Following the conclusion of the season, Obradoiro CAB earned a historic qualification to compete in the 2023–24 Basketball Champions League, marking the club's first-ever appearance in a major European continental competition.

The 2023–24 ACB season was Obradoiro´s thirteenth season in a row in the Spanish top flight. On May 12th, 2024 Obradoiro got relegated to the Spanish 2nd tier (Primera FEB).

On May 8th, 2026 Obradoiro got promoted again to the Spanish 1st tier (Liga ACB), after being crowned champions of the Primera FEB.

== Sponsorship naming ==
- 1970-1982: Obradoiro
- 1982-1988: Obradoiro Feiraco
- 1988-1996: Obradoiro
- 1996-1997: Yago Portela Obradoiro
- 1997-2000: Palmeiro Obradoiro
- 2000-2002: Obradoiro
- 2002-2009: Óptica Val Obradoiro
- 2009-2010: Xacobeo Blu:sens Obradoiro
- 2010-2013: Blu:sens Monbus Obradoiro
- 2013-2017: Río Natura Monbus Obradoiro
- 2017-present: Monbus Obradoiro

== Logos ==
Obradoiro CAB logo
(2022–present)

== Rivalries ==
Obradoiro's biggest rival is CB Breogán, both clubs contest the Galician derby. Obradoiro also has rivalries with Básquet Coruña and Club Ourense Baloncesto. Obradoiro had a rivalry with CB OAR Ferrol, which disappeared in 1996.

== Players ==
=== Retired numbers ===
- 4 Bernard Hopkins, F, 2010–2012
- 14 Tonecho Lorenzo, F, 1971–1976, 1977-1978
- 15 Oriol Junyent, C, 2009, 2010–2014

=== Current roster ===
Note: Flags indicate national team eligibility at FIBA-sanctioned events. Players may hold other non-FIBA nationalities not displayed.

Monbus Obradoiro roster
Players
Coaches

Pos.	No.	Nat.	Name	Ht.	Age
PG	0	(United States)	Childress, Brandon	1.83 m (6 ft 0 in)	29 – 31 August 1997
F/C	1	(Nigeria)	Abogidi, Efe	2.08 m (6 ft 10 in)	25 – 11 October 2001
G	3	(Nigeria)	Agada, Caleb	1.93 m (6 ft 4 in)	32 – 31 August 1994
C	7	(Brazil)	dos Anjos, Felipe	2.18 m (7 ft 2 in)	28 – 30 April 1998
F	8	(Brazil)	Meindl, Léonardo	2.01 m (6 ft 7 in)	33 – 20 March 1993
G/F	9	(Sweden)	Lundqvist, Olle (injured)	2.01 m (6 ft 7 in)	27 – 21 November 1999
C	12	(Dominican Republic)	Soriano, Joel	2.08 m (6 ft 10 in)	26 – 30 January 2000
G/F	23	(Cuba)	Barrueta, Yunio	1.96 m (6 ft 5 in)	33 – 15 April 1993
G/F	24	(Portugal)	Brito, Diogo	1.98 m (6 ft 6 in)	29 – 24 April 1997
G	25	(Spain)	Quintela, Sergi (C)	1.85 m (6 ft 1 in)	30 – 21 April 1996
SG	28	(United States)	Barcello, Alex	1.88 m (6 ft 2 in)	28 – 31 August 1998
C	44	(Spain)	Faure, Alonso	2.08 m (6 ft 10 in)	24 – 20 February 2002
PF	57	(Spain)	Galán, Alejandro	2.07 m (6 ft 9 in)	27 – 12 September 1999
PG	92	(Spain)	Soneira, Álvaro (Y)	1.88 m (6 ft 2 in)	18 – 21 February 2008
F	94	(France)	Riga, Louis (Y)	2.01 m (6 ft 7 in)	21 – 6 September 2005
PF/C		(Belarus)	Salash, Maksim	2.08 m (6 ft 10 in)	30 – 6 May 1996

Head coach

- (Spanish Basketball Federation) Diego Epifanio

Assistant coach(es)

- (Spanish Basketball Federation) Fran Hernández
- (Spanish Basketball Federation) Alberto Codeso

Legend

- (C) Team captain
- (Y) Youth player
- Injured

- Roster
- Transactions
Updated: October 22, 2026

=== Depth chart ===
Pos.	Starting 5	Bench 1	Bench 2	Bench 3	Inactive
C	Joel Soriano	Felipe dos Anjos †	Alonso Faure †
PF	Efe Abogidi	Alejandro Galán †		Maksim Salash
SF	Léonardo Meindl	Yunio Barrueta	Diogo Brito	Louis Riga ‡
SG	Alex Barcello *	Sergi Quintela †			Olle Lundqvist (injured)
PG	Brandon Childress *	Caleb Agada		Álvaro Soneira ‡

Notes: Blue † – homegrown player; (Note: A homegrown player is a player that played for at least three years before the age of 20 on a Spanish team. In Liga ACB, the team must register at least four homegrown players in rosters of 10–12 players or at least three homegrown players in rosters of 8–9 players.) Red * – overseas player; (Note: An overseas player is a player from outside EEA, FIBA Europe or ACP states. In Liga ACB, the team may register at most two overseas players.) Green ‡ – youth player (Note: In Liga ACB, the team may register under-22 players linked to the youth system.)

== Head coaches ==
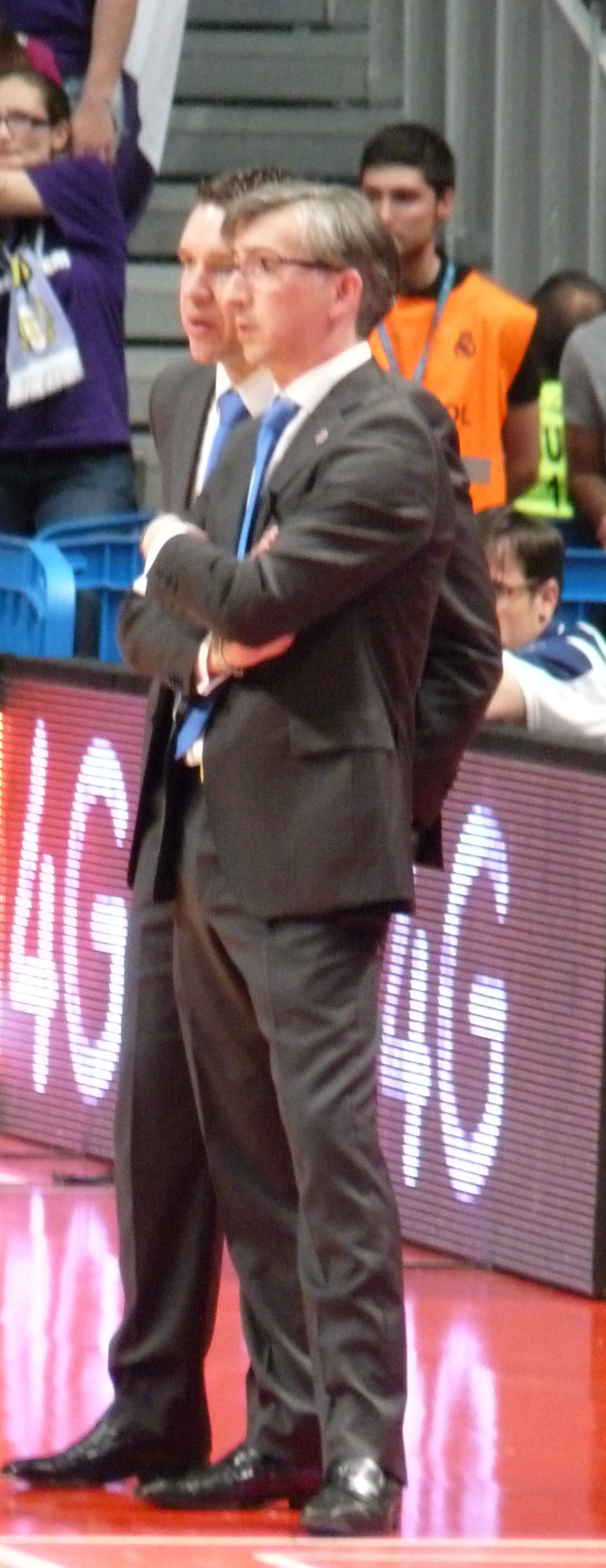
Moncho Fernández, head coach for 14 years

Head coaches since joining the ACB :

- Curro Segura : 2009–2010
- Moncho Fernández : 2010–2024
- Gonzalo Rodríguez : 2024
- Fran Hernández : 2024
- Félix Alonso : 2024–2025
- Diego Epifanio : 2025–present

== Season by season ==
Season	Tier	Division	Pos.	W–L	Copa del Rey	Other cups		European competitions		
1970–71	3	3ª División	3rd	14–1–5						
1971–72	3	3ª División	2nd	22–1–8						
1972–73	3	3ª División	1st	27–1–7						
1973–74	2	2ª División	8th	15–13						
1974–75	2	2ª División	4th	18–10						
1975–76	2	2ª División	3rd	14–2–8						
1976–77	2	2ª División	8th	13–15						
1977–78	2	2ª División	14th	8–2–20						
1978–79	3	2ª División	9th	8–2–12						
1979–80	3	2ª División	1st	22–2						
1980–81	2	1ª División B	8th	12–1–13						
1981–82	2	1ª División B	1st	18–8						
1982–83	1	1ª División	14th	2–24	Round of 16					
1983–84	2	1ª División B	12th	9–17						
1984–85	3	2ª División	1st	24–0						
1985–86	2	1ª División B	7th	17–11						
1986–87	2	1ª División B	6th	20–14						
1987–88	2	1ª División B	16th	18–26						
1988–89	2	1ª División	12th	13–19						
1989–90	2	1ª División	3rd	21–15						
1990–91	Lower divisions									
1991–92	2	1ª División	13th	13–23						
1992–03	Lower divisions									
2003–04	6	1ª Autonómica	1st	28–2						
2004–05	5	1ª División	7th	15–13						
2005–06	5	1ª División	12th	9–19						
2006–07	5	1ª División	3rd	16–12						
2007–08	6	1ª División	3rd	23–10						
2008–09	6	1ª División	1st (Note: Achieved a berth in Liga ACB after a judicial statement.)	23–10						
2009–10	1	Liga ACB	17th	8–26						
2010–11	2	LEB Oro	2nd	37–8		Copa Príncipe	C			
2011–12	1	Liga ACB	13th	13–21						
2012–13	1	Liga ACB	8th	18–16						
2013–14	1	Liga ACB	12th	13–21						
2014–15	1	Liga ACB	12th	15–19						
2015–16	1	Liga ACB	15th	10–24	Quarterfinalist					
2016–17	1	Liga ACB	13th	11–21						
2017–18	1	Liga ACB	12th	14–20						
2018–19	1	Liga ACB	15th	11–23		Supercopa	SF			
2019–20	1	Liga ACB	14th (Note: League curtailed due to the coronavirus pandemic.)	9–14						
2020–21	1	Liga ACB	14th	12–24						
2021–22	1	Liga ACB	15th	12–22						
2022–23	1	Liga ACB	11th	14–20						
2023–24	1	Liga ACB	17th	11–23				3 Champions League	QR	2–1
2024–25	2	Primera FEB	6th	24–14		Spain Cup	RU			
2025–26	2	Primera FEB	1st	28–4		Spain Cup	QF			
2026–27	1	Liga ACB								

== Home arenas ==
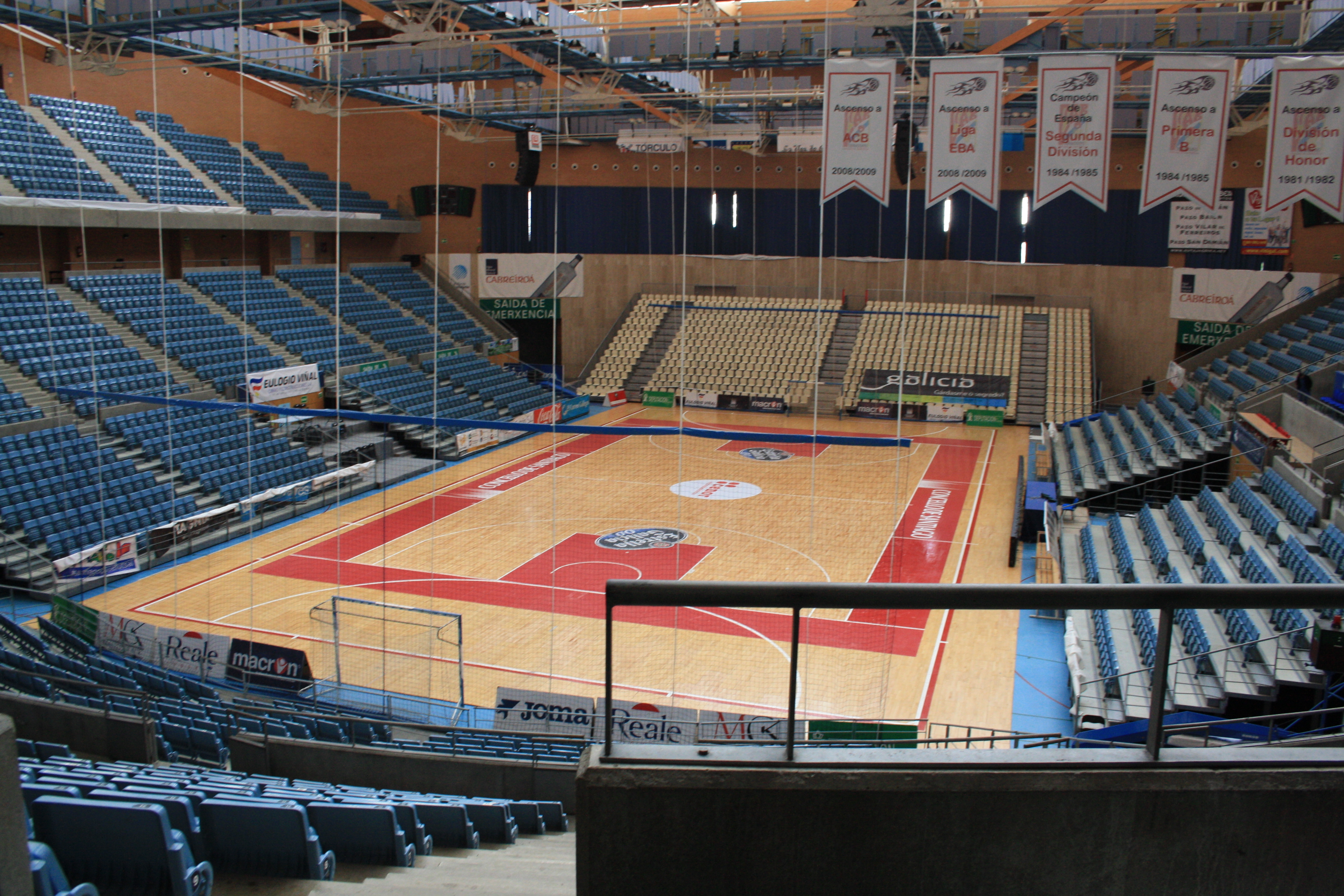
The Fontes do Sar, the home arena of Obradoiro since 2009

- University Gymnasium (1970–76).
- Pabellón Brañas do Sar (1976–1990).
- Polideportivo Lorenzo da Torre (1990–2009).
- Pabellón Multiusos Fontes do Sar (2009–present).

== Notable players ==
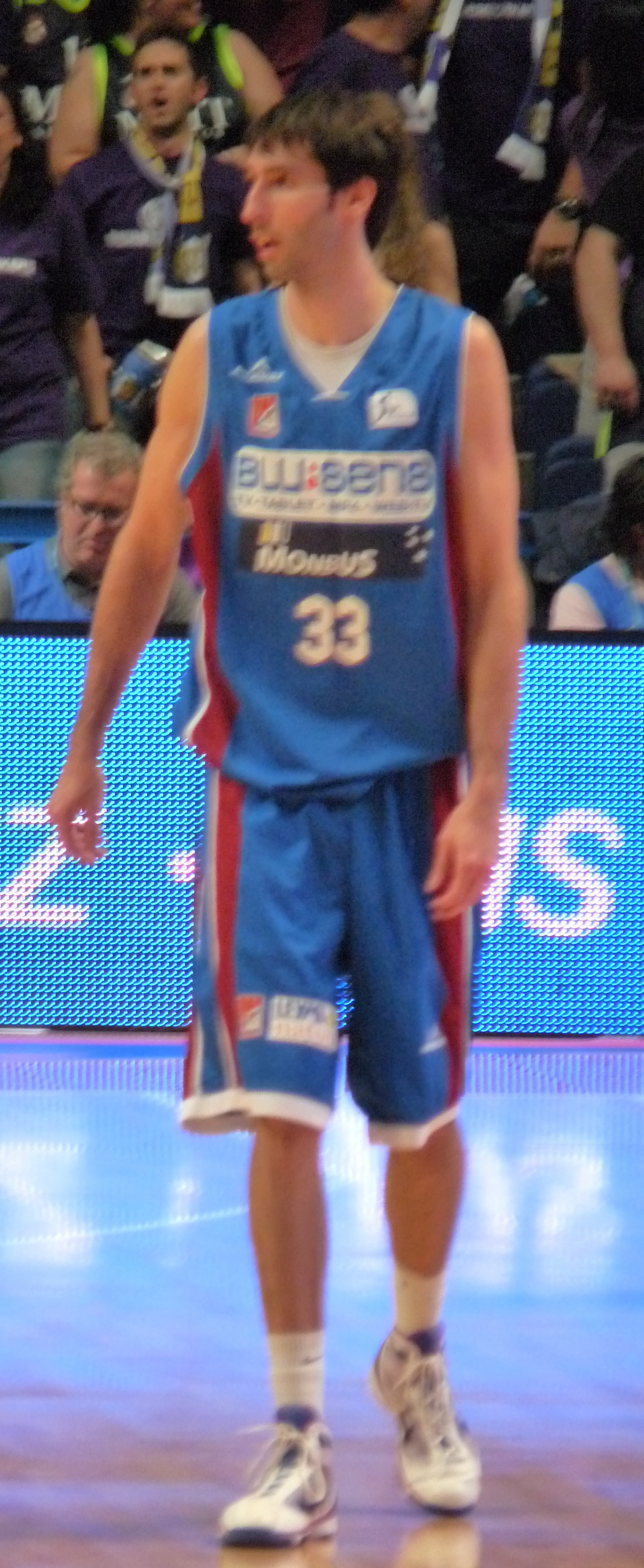
Alberto Corbacho

- (Spain) Alberto Corbacho
- (Spain) Oriol Junyent
- (Spain) Nacho Llovet
- (Spain) Tonecho Lorenzo
- (Spain) Álvaro Muñoz
- (Spain) David Navarro
- (Spain) Albert Oliver
- (Spain) Pepe Pozas
- (Spain) Sergi Quintela
- (Spain) Santiago Yusta
- (France) Léo Westermann
- (Italy) Angelo Caloiaro
- (Portugal) Diogo Brito
- (Greece) Kostas Vasileiadis
- (Russia) Evgeny Kolesnikov
- (Ukraine) Artem Pustovyi
- (Czech Republic) Pavel Pumprla
- (Slovakia) Vladimir Brodziansky
- (Serbia) Dejan Kravić
- (Croatia) Dragan Bender
- (Bosnia and Herzegovina) Nihad Đedović
- (Montenegro) Nemanja Radović
- (Australia) Aleks Marić
- (Canada) Levon Kendall
- (Canada) Kassius Robertson
- (Canada) Phil Scrubb
- (Canada) Thomas Scrubb
- (United States) Alex Barcello
- (United States) Paul Davis
- (United States) Devon Dotson
- (United States) Bernard Hopkins
- (United States) Robbie Hummel
- (United States) Marc Jackson
- (United States) Mickey McConnell
- (United States) Donnie McGrath
- (United States) Mike Muscala
- (United States) Kyle Singler
- (United States) Matt Thomas
- (United States) Shayne Whittington
- (Puerto Rico) Andrés Rodríguez
- (Belize) Milt Palacio
- (Germany) Maxi Kleber
- (Germany) Andreas Obst
- (Poland) Adam Waczyński
- (Sweden) Chris Czerapowicz
- (Argentina) Javier Bulfoni
- (Argentina) Maximiliano Stanic
- (Brazil) Rafael Hettsheimeir
- (Brazil) Rafa Luz
- (Nigeria) Ebi Ere
- (Tunisia) Salah Mejri
- (Gabon) Stéphane Lasme
- (Lithuania) Eimantas Bendžius
- (Lithuania) Laurynas Birutis
- (Lithuania) Marek Blaževič
- (Lithuania) Deividas Dulkys
- (Latvia) Jānis Timma

== Trophies and awards ==
=== Trophies ===
- Primera FEB: (1)
  - 2026
- Copa Príncipe: (1)
  - 2011
- LEB Oro Playoffs: (1)
  - 2011
- Copa Galicia: (10)
  - 2010, 2011, 2012, 2013, 2014, 2015, 2016, 2017, 2019, 2023

=== Records ===
- 16 seasons in the top division
  - 1 in Primera División
  - 15 in Liga ACB
- 1 season in the Basketball Champions League

=== Individual awards ===
ACB Top Scorer

- Kassius Robertson – 2022/2023 (17,4 points per game)

ACB Top Passer

- Mickey McConnell – 2016/2017 (6,5 assists per game)

ACB Rising Star Award

- Salah Mejri – 2012/2013

All-ACB Best Young Players Team

- Santiago Yusta – 2015/2016

ACB Three Point Shootout Runner-Up

- Alberto Corbacho – 2016/2017

== Reserve team ==
Obradoiro's reserve team, Obradoiro Ames, currently competes in the Tercera FEB.
