= Andrés Rodríguez (basketball) =

Puerto Rican basketball player

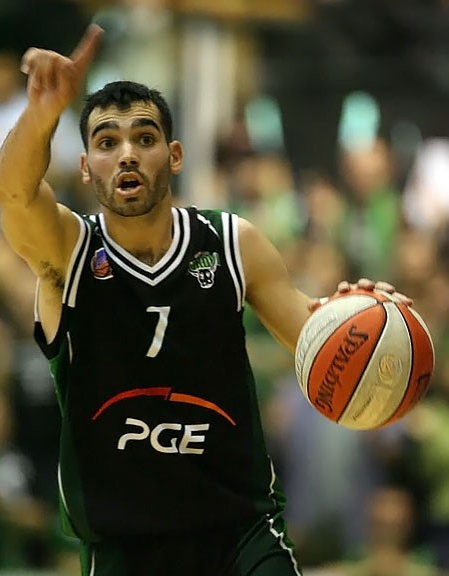
- Rodríguez playing for Turów Zgorzelec during the 2008 PLK Finals.

Free agent
- Position: Point guard

Personal information
- Born: February 27, 1981 (age 45) San Juan, Puerto Rico
- Listed height: 6 ft 0.5 in (1.84 m)
- Listed weight: 179 lb (81 kg)

Career information
- College: Louisville (1999–2000); American (2001–2004)
- Playing career: 2004–present

Career history
- 2004–2005: Olimpija Ljubljana
- 2005–2006: Dynamo Moscow
- 2006–2008: Turów Zgorzelec
- 2008–2009: Donetsk
- 2009: Saski Baskonia
- 2009–2013: Obradoiro CAB
- 2010–2013: Capitanes de Arecibo
- 2014: Cangrejeros de Santurce
- 2014–2015: Baloncesto Fuenlabrada
- 2015: Vaqueros de Bayamón
- 2016: Atenienses de Manatí

Career highlights
- 3x BSN Champion (2006, 2010–11); PLK Best Defender (2007)
Medals
Men's basketball
Representing Puerto Rico
FIBA AmeriCup
Silver medal – second place	2013 Venezuela
Central American and Caribbean Games
Gold medal – first place	2006 Cartagena de Indias
Centrobasket
Silver medal – second place	2012 San Juan

Andrés Guillermo Rodríguez Fernández (born February 27, 1981) is a Puerto Rican professional basketball player, who last played for Atenienses de Manatí of the Baloncesto Superior Nacional. He was born in Puerto Rico, where he debuted as a professional basketball played for the Criollos de Caguas in 1999. Rodríguez attended University of Louisville and American University, completing his college education in 2004. Afterwards, he migrated to Europe, where he first played for Olimpija Ljubljana and had his best season by leading the Liga ACB in assists per game in 2013 with Obradoiro CAB. While concurrently playing in Puerto Rico, Rodríguez won three BSN championships for two different teams. Internationally, he is a member of the Puerto Rico national basketball team.

== Early and college career ==
Rodríguez began his college career in 1999 after graduating from Colegio San Ignacio de Loyola, joining the University of Louisville after becoming a walk on member of the Cardinals squad as a freshman. He debuted on December 15 playing only four minutes, recovering a rebound and stealing a ball. In his next appearance, Rodríguez scored a free throw and stole two balls. In his final appearance for Louisville, he only played a minute and recorded a steal. That same year, he debuted as a professional in his native Puerto Rico for the Criollos de Caguas of the Baloncesto Superior Nacional (BSN). In 2001, he transferred to American University. In seasons 2001–02, 2002–03 and 2003–04 played in the Patriot League Championship for the institution's team, the Eagles. Rodríguez completed a finance major, graduating with an average of 3.62 and forming part of the honor roll. Afterwards, he planned a move back to Puerto Rico in order to study law, but a basketball agent convinced him to pursue professional tryouts.

== Playing in Europe and return to the BSN ==
Rodríguez has a playing style that is decidedly centered around teamwork, something that made him a better fit for European teams. He was able to make a quick and successful transition shortly after graduating from college, joining Olimpija Ljubljana of the Premier A Slovenian Basketball League. Rodríguez recognized that the stark contrast presented by his style in a fast-paced league like the BSN was a hindrance that prevented him from melding for several years. However, he consistently returned to play in Puerto Rico during the international offseason. By his second postgrad year, Rodríguez had established a presence in the European market, signing with BC Dynamo Moscow of the Russian Basketball Super League. His first multi-year stint was with PGE Turów Zgorzelec of the Polish Basketball League. Back in the BSN during the offseason, Rodríguez formed part of the first Criollos team to win the league championship.

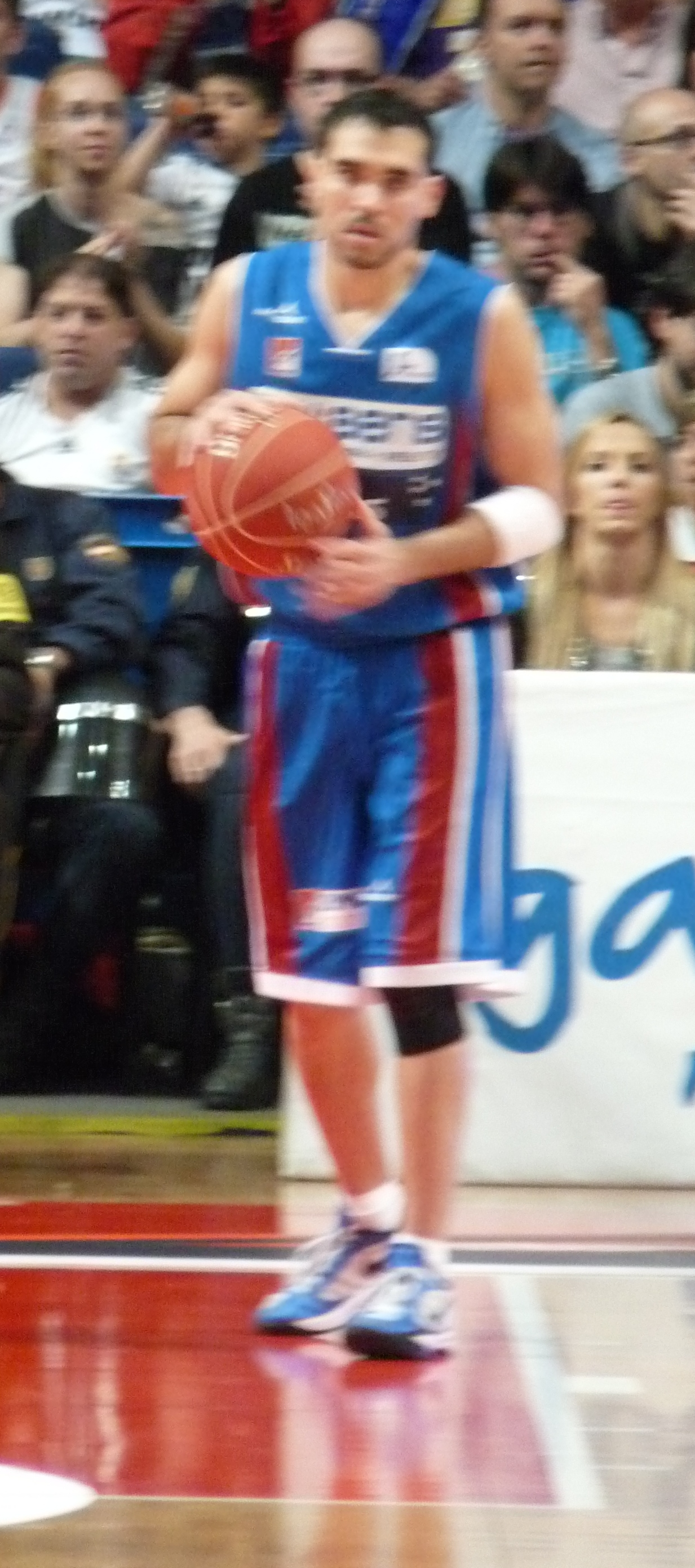
Rodríguez playing for Obradoiro in 2013.

Rodríguez began the 2008–09 season by completing his first stay in the Liga ACB by completing the pre-season with Caja Laboral. Afterwards, he signed with BC Donetsk of the Ukrainian Basketball SuperLeague. The following season, Rodríguez returned to the Liga ACB, this time joining Obradoiro CAB. After two seasons of absence, Rodríguez returned to the BSN in 2010, becoming the regular point guard of the Capitanes de Arecibo. Under his lead, the team won back to back championships. In his return to the Liga ACB with Blusens Monbus, Rodríguez lead the league in assists and the team unexpectedly advanced to the post season. This directly limited his participation with the Capitanes. In November 2013, the Capitanes traded him to the Cangrejeros de Santurce in exchange for Walter Hodge and Jonathan Han. Still nursing a knee injury, Rodríguez decided not to pursue an international contract in order to rehabilitate.

On November 19, 2014, he signed with Baloncesto Fuenlabrada. On February 16, 2015, he parted ways with Fuenlabrada.

== National team career ==
Rodríguez made his international debut by playing for the youth versions of the Puerto Rico national basketball team. He made his debut for the adult team at the 2006 Central American and Caribbean Games, where Puerto Rico won the gold medal. Rodríguez was included in the preliminary lists for several events held in 2010, but he was not selected by coach Manuel Cintrón. Due to the fact that his father, Luis Dominic Rodríguez, was born in the Dominican Republic he considered joining the Dominican Republic national basketball team if no interest was shown, but ultimately disregarded this idea by noting that playing for Puerto Rico had always been his preference. After Cintrón was fired from the team, Rodríguez was included in the team that participated in the 2011 FIBA Americas Championship by Flor Meléndez.

He was initially meant to serve as a third backup point guard, but the coach's strategy of using Carlos Arroyo and José Barea at once placed him in charge of a defensive backup squad. Puerto Rico was unable to qualify with a narrow 2-point loss to Argentina, but qualified to the 2012 FIBA World Olympic Qualifying Tournament for Men. The following year, Rodríguez joined the B squad that won silver at the Centrobasket championship. He repeated his previous role at the Olympic Qualifying Tournament. However, another narrow loss costed them the opportunity to qualify to the Olympics and eventually lead to the termination of Meléndez. Under coach Paco Olmos, Rodriguez returned in his backup role and joined the team for the 2013 FIBA Americas Championship, which qualified directly for the 2014 FIBA World Cup by winning the silver medal.

== Personal life ==
Rodríguez is married to Adienid Muñiz. The couple's first child, Antoneo Andrés Rodríguez Muñiz, was born on October 27, 2012, while his father was playing abroad for Blusens Monbus. Before playing in the fifth game of the season, Muñiz was taken to Hospital La Rosaleda in Santiago de Compostela for a routine checkup after experiencing some discomfort, while Rodríguez proceeded to the game where they were supposed to rendezvous. However, once there she entered labor to the surprise of both, since the birth was expected to take place a month after. In 2015, the couple had their first daughter.

== Career statistics ==
Legend
GP	Games played	GS	Games started	MPG	Minutes per game
FG%	Field goal percentage	3P%	3-point field goal percentage	FT%	Free throw percentage
RPG	Rebounds per game	APG	Assists per game	SPG	Steals per game
BPG	Blocks per game	PPG	Points per game	**Bold**	Career high

Correct as of 28.01.2009

Year	Team	GP	GS	MPG	FG%	3P%	FT%	RPG	APG	SPG	BPG	PPG
2008–09	BC Donetsk	20		33.00	.44	.19	.77	4.00	6.25	2.65	**.25**	8.8
