= 2007–08 CE Lleida Bàsquet season =

- Head coach: Eduard Torres
- Arena: Barris Nord

Results
- Record: 19–15 (.559)
- Place: Division: 6th (LEB Oro); Conference: 6th
- Playoff finish: 2008 LEB Oro Playoffs

The 2007-08 Plus Pujol Lleida season is their 5th season in the Adecco LEB Oro.

== Game log ==
=== September ===
Record: 1–1; Home: 0–1; Road: 1–0

#	Date	Visitor	Score	Home	OT	Leading scorer	Attendance	Record
1	September 21, 2007	Ciudad de Huelva	65–73	Plus Pujol	NA	Dave Fergerson (15)	-	0–1
2	September 28, 2007	Plus Pujol	79–90	Ford Burgos	NA	Leo Mainoldi (28)	-	1–1

=== October ===
Record: 3–1; Home: 2–0; Road: 1–1

#	Date	Visitor	Score	Home	OT	Leading scorer	Attendance	Record
3	October 6, 2007	Aguas de Valencia-Gandía	84–71	Plus Pujol	NA	Leo Mainoldi (22)	-	2–1
4	October 13, 2007	Plus Pujol	75-66	Alerta Cantabria	NA	Berni Álvarez (11)	-	2–2
5	October 20, 2007	Alicante Costa Blanca	78–76	Plus Pujol	NA	Dave Fergerson (14)	-	3–2
6	October 24, 2007	Plus Pujol	73-77	Beirasar Rosalía	NA	Leo Mainoldi (19)	-	4–2

=== November ===
Record: 2–2; Home: 1–1; Road: 1–1

#	Date	Visitor	Score	Home	OT	Leading scorer	Attendance	Record
7	November 3, 2007	Ciudad de La Laguna	100–81	Plus Pujol	NA	Jaume Comas (18)	-	5–2
8	November 9, 2007	Plus Pujol	72-64	Villa de Los Barrios	NA	Brian Jones (18)	-	5–3
9	November 16, 2007	Melilla Baloncesto	88–94	Plus Pujol	NA	Alberto Miguel (15)	-	5–4
10	November 23, 2007	Plus Pujol	86-95	Fundació Basquetinca.com	NA	Leo Mainoldi (23)	-	6–4

=== December ===
Record: 3–1; Home: 2–0; Road: 1–1

#	Date	Visitor	Score	Home	OT	Leading scorer	Attendance	Record
11	December 1, 2007	Palma Aqua Mágica	83–74	Plus Pujol	NA	Alberto Miguel (16)	-	7–4
12	December 7, 2007	Plus Pujol	64-72	CB L'Hospitalet	NA	Dave Fergerson (16)	-	8–4
13	December 15, 2007	Plus Pujol	79-73	Leche Río Breogán	NA	Leo Mainoldi, Christian Maråker, Brian Jones (13)	-	8–5
14	December 21, 2007	UB La Palma	98–85	Plus Pujol	NA	Alberto Miguel (18)	-	9–5

=== January ===
Record: 0–3; Home: 0–1; Road: 0–2

#	Date	Visitor	Score	Home	OT	Leading scorer	Attendance	Record
15	January 4, 2008	Plus Pujol	61-56	Tenerife Rural	NA	Leo Mainoldi (15)	-	9–6
16	January 12, 2008	Bruesa GBC	73–82	Plus Pujol	NA	Leo Mainoldi (24)	-	9–7
17	January 18, 2008	Plus Pujol	81-58	Basket CAI Zaragoza	NA	Leo Mainoldi, Rafael Hettsheimeir (12)	-	9–8

=== February ===
Record: 3–1; Home: 2–0; Road: 1–1

#	Date	Visitor	Score	Home	OT	Leading scorer	Attendance	Record
18	February 1, 2008	Plus Pujol	74-75	Ciudad de Huelva	NA	Leo Mainoldi (20)	-	10–8
19	February 10, 2008	Ford Burgos	83–70	Plus Pujol	NA	Leo Mainoldi (17)	-	11–8
20	February 16, 2008	Plus Pujol	81-76	Aguas de Valencia-Gandía	NA	Leo Mainoldi (18)	-	11–9
21	February 23, 2008	Alerta Cantabria	90–77	Plus Pujol	NA	Leo Mainoldi (23)	-	12–9

=== March ===
Record: 3-3; Home: 2–1; Road: 1-2

#	Date	Visitor	Score	Home	OT	Leading scorer	Attendance	Record
22	March 2	Plus Pujol	78-101	Alicante Costa Blanca	NA	Leo Mainoldi (21)	-	13-9
23	March 8	Beirasar Rosalía	80-78	Plus Pujol	NA	Brian Jones (17)	-	14-9
24	March 14	Plus Pujol	84-66	Ciudad de La Laguna	NA	Leo Mainoldi (14)	-	14-10
25	March 19	Villa de Los Barrios	103-72	Plus Pujol	NA	Rafael Hettsheimeir (31)	-	15-10
26	March 26	Plus Pujol	78-65	Melilla Baloncesto	NA	Rafael Hettsheimeir (17)	-	15-11
27	March 30	Fundació Basquetinca.com	73-82	Plus Pujol	NA	Leo Mainoldi (24)	-	15-12

=== April ===
Record: 3–1; Home: 1-1; Road: 2-0

#	Date	Visitor	Score	Home	OT	Leading scorer	Attendance	Record
28	April 6	Plus Pujol	62-66	CB Alcúdia	NA	Rafael Hettsheimeir (16)	-	16-12
29	April 11	CB L'Hospitalet	92-86	Plus Pujol	NA	Kevin Thompson (17)	-	17-12
30	April 18	Leche Río Breogán	79-84	Plus Pujol	NA	Kevin Thompson (18)	-	17-13
31	April 25	Plus Pujol	78-92	UB La Palma	NA	Leo Mainoldi (17)	-	18-13

=== May ===
Record: 1–2; Home: 0–2; Road: 1-0

#	Date	Visitor	Score	Home	OT	Leading scorer	Attendance	Record
32	May 3	Tenerife Rural	83-93	Plus Pujol	NA	Rafael Hettsheimeir (15)	-	18-14
33	May 9	Plus Pujol	76-79	Bruesa GBC	NA	Rafael Hettsheimeir (15)	-	19-14
34	May 16	Basket CAI Zaragoza	91-96	Plus Pujol	1	Leo Mainoldi (21)	-	19-15

== Playoffs ==
=== Game log ===
#	Date	Visitor	Score	Home	OT	Leading scorer	Attendance	Series
1	May 20	Plus Pujol	86-89	Tenerife Rural	NA	Leo Mainoldi (28)	-	1-0
2	May 24	Tenerife Rural	81-92	Plus Pujol	NA	Dave Fergerson (19)	-	1-1
3	May 27	Plus Pujol	91-85	Tenerife Rural	NA	Dave Fergerson, Kevin Thompson (17)	-	1-2

== Player stats ==
Legend
GP	Games played	GS	Games started	MPG	Minutes per game
FG%	Field-goal percentage	3P%	3-point field-goal percentage	FT%	Free-throw percentage
RPG	Rebounds per game	APG	Assists per game	SPG	Steals per game
BPG	Blocks per game	PPG	Points per game

=== Regular season and play off ===
Player	GP	GS	MPG	FG%	3P%	FT%	RPG	APG	SPG	BPG	PPG
Berni Álvarez	36	7	15.6	.487	.385	.593	1.2	.7	.53	.000	5.7
Jaume Comas	34	7	18.0	.606	.339	.704	1.6	2.4	.68	.000	6.9
Pol Domingo	1	0	1.0	.000	.000	.000	1.0	.0	.00	.000	.0
Carles Estorach	5	0	2.6	.000	.000	.000	0.2	.0	.00	.000	.0
Dave Fergerson	37	22	25.8	.467	.327	.726	2.0	2.6	.92	.08	9.3
Brock Gillespie	1	0	17.0	.333	.250	.000	.0	3.0	3.00	.000	5.0
Erek Hansen	14	7	15.8	.524	.000	.538	3.3	.2	.42	1.64	5.6
Rafael Hettsheimeir	36	19	20.7	.583	.142	.715	5.1	.5	.44	.41	10.1
Brian Jones	36	30	23.7	.516	.206	.696	2.9	3.7	1.47	.000	8.9
Oriol Jorge	7	0	3.0	.000	.500	.500	0.1	.0	.14	.000	.6
Leo Mainoldi	37	35	28.6	.472	.404	.795	6.2	1.2	1.0	.13	14.9
Christian Maråker	26	2	13.1	.500	.190	.681	2.9	.5	.38	.34	4.7
Alberto Miguel	37	16	24.8	.468	.403	.778	1.7	1.3	1.0	.08	9.6
Jorge Negro	1	0	1.0	.000	.000	.000	.0	.0	.0	.0	.0
Bill Phillips	2	0	15.0	.000	.000	.000	2.0	.5	.0	.0	.0
Juampi Sutina	1	0	1.0	1.000	.000	.000	.0	.0	.0	.0	2.0
Kevin Thompson	13	11	27.0	.684	.000	.571	6.4	1.1	.92	.61	11.5
Marcus Vinícius Toledo	37	29	19.5	.575	.229	.667	4.6	.8	1.5	.2	6.1
