= 2008–09 CE Lleida Bàsquet season =

- Head coach: Eduard Torres
- Arena: Barris Nord

Results
- Record: 18–16 (.529)
- Place: Division: 10th (LEB Oro); Conference: 10th
- Playoff finish: 2009 LEB Oro Playoffs

The 2008–09 Plus Pujol Lleida season is their 6th season in the Adecco LEB Oro.

== Game log ==
=== September ===
Record: 2–0; Home: 1–0; Road: 1–0

#	Date	Visitor	Score	Home	OT	Leading scorer	Attendance	Record
1	September 18, 2008	La Palma	97–77	Plus Pujol	NA	Dmitry Flis (16)	2,098	1–0
2	September 26, 2008	Plus Pujol	80–89	Beirasar Rosalía	NA	Gimel Lewis (19)	1,400	2–0

=== October ===
Record: 2–3; Home: 1–2; Road: 1–1

#	Date	Visitor	Score	Home	OT	Leading scorer	Attendance	Record
3	October 3, 2008	Lucentum Alicante	78–81	Plus Pujol	NA	Quino Colom (18)	2,358	2–1
4	October 10, 2008	Plus Pujol	89–76	Melilla Baloncesto	NA	Alberto Miguel (17)	2,000	2–2
5	October 17, 2008	Tenerife Rural	82–93	Plus Pujol	NA	Troy DeVries (17)	2,413	2–3
6	October 25, 2008	Plus Pujol	87–90	CB Valladolid	NA	Troy DeVries (25)	3,000	3–3
7	October 31, 2008	Grupo Begar León	82–71	Plus Pujol	NA	Quino Colom (12)	2,137	4–3

=== November ===
Record: 2–2; Home: 1–1; Road: 1–1

#	Date	Visitor	Score	Home	OT	Leading scorer	Attendance	Record
8	November 7, 2008	Plus Pujol	95–97	Ford Burgos	NA	Alberto Miguel (19)	2,400	5–3
9	November 14, 2008	Gandía	96–80	Plus Pujol	NA	Troy DeVries (20)	2,581	6–3
10	November 22, 2008	Plus Pujol	100–77	Illescas Urban CLM	NA	Rafael Hettsheimeir (19)	1,100	6–4
11	November 28, 2008	Clínicas Rincón Axarquía	69–73	Plus Pujol	NA	Rafael Hettsheimeir (20)	2,387	6–5

=== December ===
Record: 2–1; Home: 0–1; Road: 2–0

#	Date	Visitor	Score	Home	OT	Leading scorer	Attendance	Record
12	December 5, 2008	Plus Pujol	105–110	Mallorca	1	Quino Colom (24)	2,200	7–5
13	December 12, 2008	Villa de Los Barrios	84–86	Plus Pujol	NA	Salva Arco (19)	2,613	7–6
14	December 19, 2008	Plus Pujol	80–93	Ciudad de La Laguna Canarias	NA	Rafael Hettsheimeir (27)	2,200	8–6

=== January ===
Record: 1–3; Home: 0–1; Road: 1–2

#	Date	Visitor	Score	Home	OT	Leading scorer	Attendance	Record
15	January 4, 2009	Plus Pujol	67–76	Cáceres 2016	NA	Salva Arco (22)	3,000	9–6
16	January 9, 2009	Leche Río Breogán	68–78	Plus Pujol	NA	Quino Colom (16)	2,500	9–7
17	January 17, 2009	Plus Pujol	89–76	Vic	NA	Rafael Hettsheimeir (20)	950	9–8
18	January 23, 2009	Plus Pujol	74–66	La Palma	NA	Troy DeVries (14)	500	9–9

=== February ===
Record: 2–2; Home: 2–0; Road: 0–2

#	Date	Visitor	Score	Home	OT	Leading scorer	Attendance	Record
19	February 6, 2009	Beirasar Rosalía	80–78	Plus Pujol	NA	Rafael Hettsheimeir (22)	2,600	10–9
20	February 15, 2009	Plus Pujol	67–57	Lucentum Alicante	NA	Rafael Hettsheimeir (16)	3,000	10–10
21	February 20, 2009	Melilla Baloncesto	78–71	Plus Pujol	NA	Troy DeVries (22)	3,200	11–10
22	February 27, 2009	Plus Pujol	87–79	Tenerife Rural	NA	Alberto Miguel (15)	1,900	11–11

=== March ===
Record: 1–3; Home: 0–2; Road: 1–1

#	Date	Visitor	Score	Home	OT	Leading scorer	Attendance	Record
23	March 6, 2009	Valladolid	70–82	Plus Pujol	NA	Marcus Vinícius Toledo (17)	2,780	11–12
24	March 14, 2009	Plus Pujol	75–73	Grupo Begar León	NA	Troy DeVries (30)	4,600	11–13
25	March 20, 2009	Ford Burgos	65–79	Plus Pujol	NA	Troy DeVries, Marcus Vinícius Toledo (12)	2,650	11–14
26	March 28, 2009	Plus Pujol	70–73	Gandía	NA	Troy DeVries (20)	1,000	12–14

=== April ===
Record: 4–1; Home: 3–0; Road: 1–1

#	Date	Visitor	Score	Home	OT	Leading scorer	Attendance	Record
27	April 3, 2009	Illescas Urban CLM	89–76	Plus Pujol	NA	Rafael Hettsheimeir (21)	2,258	13–14
28	April 8, 2009	Plus Pujol	69–71	Clínicas Rincón Axarquía	NA	Troy DeVries (22)	800	14–14
29	April 15, 2009	Mallorca	83–80	Plus Pujol	NA	Troy DeVries (29)	2,000	15–14
30	April 19, 2009	Plus Pujol	89–84	Villa de Los Barrios	NA	Troy DeVries (22)	400	15–15
31	April 24, 2009	Ciudad de La Laguna	101–85	Plus Pujol	NA	Ondřej Starosta (27)	2,800	16–15

=== May ===
Record: 2–1; Home: 2–0; Road: 0–1

#	Date	Visitor	Score	Home	OT	Leading scorer	Attendance	Record
32	May 1, 2009	Cáceres 2016	72–64	Plus Pujol	NA	Troy DeVries (16)	4,871	17–15
33	May 8, 2009	Plus Pujol	67–64	Leche Río Breogán	NA	Troy DeVries (15)	3,000	17–16
34	May 15, 2009	Vic	70–54	Plus Pujol	NA	Ondřej Starosta (22)	5,131	18–16

== Player stats ==
Legend
GP	Games played	GS	Games started	MPG	Minutes per game
FG%	Field-goal percentage	3P%	3-point field-goal percentage	FT%	Free-throw percentage
RPG	Rebounds per game	APG	Assists per game	SPG	Steals per game
BPG	Blocks per game	PPG	Points per game

=== Regular season and play off ===
Player	GP	GS	MPG	FG%	3P%	FT%	RPG	APG	SPG	BPG	PPG
Salva Arco	20	7	22.5	.605	.388	.893	2.3	0.9	0.8	.000	9.4
Quino Colom	17	4	21.8	.516	.375	.762	1.4	3.3	0.6	.118	10.8
Troy DeVries	34	24	26.8	.504	.421	.802	2.2	1.1	0.9	.059	15.6
Pol Domingo	1	0	1.0	.000	.000	.000	.0	.0	.00	.000	.0
Dmitry Flis	30	11	16.0	.662	.416	.552	2.9	0.7	0.5	.467	6.9
Roger Fornas	21	9	15.9	.525	.367	.529	3.6	0.5	0.7	.190	5.0
Rafael Hettsheimeir	31	20	22.1	.618	.238	.736	4.9	0.8	0.5	.452	11.4
Oriol Jorge	16	1	7.8	.500	.312	1.000	0.5	0.6	0.2	.000	1.9
Gimel Lewis	34	19	20.5	.637	.000	.547	5.5	0.5	0.8	1.118	7.9
Javier Mendiburu	33	27	23.3	.460	.275	.548	2.9	4.7	1.2	.060	6.7
Alberto Miguel	30	14	24.7	.408	.357	.737	1.3	1.2	1.2	.000	7.6
Pierre Oriola	1	0	1.0	.000	.000	.000	.0	.0	.00	.000	.0
Ondřej Starosta	16	9	24.1	.596	.000	.528	6.9	1.1	0.7	.875	10.5
Marcus Vinícius Toledo	32	23	20.5	.504	.302	.653	3.9	0.7	1.3	.250	6.9
Maurice Whitfield	14	2	14.8	.333	.238	.773	1.3	1.3	0.9	.000	3.3
