= Liga de Verano ACB =

Spanish basketball competition

- Founded: 1994; 32 years ago
- First season: 1994
- Folded: 2008
- Country: Spain
- Confederation: FIBA Europe
- Number of teams: 8
- Last champions: CB Gran Canaria (2005)
- Most championships: Unicaja (5 titles)
- Website: acb.com

The Liga de Verano ACB (English: ACB Summer League Cup) was an annual cup competition for Spanish basketball teams organized by Spain's top professional league, the Liga ACB. It was played at the end of the season and also served as an all-star competition with three-point and slam-dunk contests.

== History ==
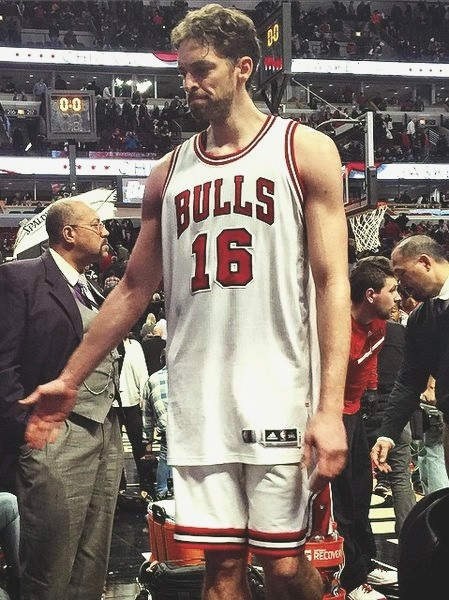
Pau Gasol was the MVP in the 7th edition.

The Liga de Verano ACB was first played in 1994 and contested by the top 8 teams of the Liga ACB. Double editions were played from 1995 until 2003. The last one was held in 2005.

FC Porto and Venezuela Youth national team were the only non-Spanish teams to feature in the Cup, getting invitaions in 1997 and 2003 respectively.

Three more editions were held between 2005 and 2008, including U-20 teams.

== Format ==
The Cup was played in a knock-out format in a neutral venue. The tournament was played in a Final Eight format. The eight teams played a knockout tournament at one venue, over four days, every June.

There was also a Three-Point Shoot contest (!994-2002) and a slam-dunk competition (1994-2000) carried out during the tournament. Liga de Verano ACB was considered one of the highlights of the Spanish sporting calendar and its last season event.

== Finals ==
Year	Dates	Winner	Score	Runners-up	Venue	Location	MVP	Participants
1994	June 16-19	Unicaja	103-98	Club Ourense	Pabellón Pedro Ferrándiz	Alcoy	(United States) Anthony Harmon	León, Coren Orense, Pamesa Valencia, Huesca, Unicaja, Barcelona, TDK Manresa, Murcia
1995 (I)	June 8-11	Unicaja	98-86	Grupo AGB Huesca	Pabellón Pedro Ferrándiz	Alcoy	(Spain) Nacho Biota	Barcelona, Murcia, Unicaja, TDK Manresa, Pamesa Valencia, Huesca, León, Coren Orense
1995 (II)	June 19-24	CB Salamanca	115-97	Barcelona Banca Catalana	Polideportivo Fernando Martín	Fuenlabrada	(United States) Cedric Moore	Barcelona, Unicaja, Baloncesto Salamanca, Baloncesto León, Festina Andorrra, Fuenlabrada, Murcia, Valvi Girona, Real Madrid Teka, Fórum Valladolid
1996 (I)	June 13-16	TDK Manresa	87-76	Unicaja	Pabellón Pedro Ferrándiz	Alcoy	(United States) Roosvelt Wallace	TDK Manresa, Baloncesto León, Murcia, Real Madrid, Barcelona, Unicaja, Fórum Valladolid, Estudiantes Argentaria
1996 (II)	June 19-22	CB Fuenlabrada	90-81	Pamesa Valencia	Pabellón Pedro Ferrándiz	Alcoy	(Spain) Berni Álvarez	Barcelona, Murcia, Ourense, Pamesa Valencia, Fuenlabrada, Caja San Fernando, León, Fórum Valladolid
1997 (I)	June 5-8	Festina Badalona	78-68	Caja España León	Pabellón Pedro Ferrándiz	Alcoy	(Spain) César Sanmartín	Barcelona, Valvi Girona, Unicaja, León, Real Madrid Teka, Pamesa Valencia, Festina Joventut, TDK Manresa
1997 (II)	June 11-14	Festina Badalona	93-80	Barcelona Banca Catalana	Polideportivo Fernando Martín	Fuenlabrada	(Spain) Iván Corrales	Festina Joventut, Pamesa Valencia, Murcia, Porto FC (Portugal), Fuenlabrada, Fórum Valladolid, Caja San Fernando, Barcelona
1998 (I)	June 11-14	TDK Manresa	59-57	Valvi Girona	Pabellón Pedro Ferrándiz	Alcoy	(Spain) Román Montañez	Festina Joventut, Fórum Valladolid, Valvi Girona, Unicaja, Barcelona, TDK Manresa, León Caja España, Pamesa Valencia
1998 (II)	June 17-20	Spain national team B	94-88	Caja España León	Polideportivo Fernando Martín	Fuenlabrada	(Spain) Nacho Ordín	Real Madrid Teka, Covirán Sierra Nevada, Barcelona, León Caja España, Fuenlabrada, Pamesa Valencia, Spain national team B, Unicaja
1999 (I)	June 3-6	Unicaja	75-69	Barcelona	Pabellón Pedro Ferrándiz	Alcoy	(Spain) Pau Gasol	Pinturas Bruguer Badalona, Unicaja, León Caja España, TDK Manresa, Barcelona, Pamesa Valencia, Girona Gavis, Murcia
1999 (II)	June 8-11	Fuenlabrada	99-96	Pinturas Bruguer Badalona	Polideportivo Fernando Martín	Fuenlabrada	(Spain) Raül López	Pinturas Bruguer Badalona, Cáceres C.B., Caja San Fernando, León Caja España, Fuenlabrada, Unicaja, Pamesa Valencia, Fórum Valladolid
2000 (I)	June 8-11	TDK Manresa	57-56	Pamesa Valencia	Pabellón Pedro Ferrándiz	Alcoy	(Spain) Jorge Sotomayor	Joventut Badalona, Fórum Valladolid, León Caja España, TDK Manresa, Barcelona, Pamesa Valencia, Casademont Girona, Unicaja
2000 (II)	June 13-16	Unicaja	62-55	Fórum Valladolid	Polideportivo Fernando Martín	Fuenlabrada	(Spain) Carlos Cabezas	Tau Cerámica, Fórum Valladolid, Pamesa Valencia, Cáceres C.B., Fuenlabrada, Unicaja, Canarias Telecom, Real Madrid Teka
2001 (I)	June 6-9	Fórum Valladolid	87-74	Jabones Pardo Fuenlabrada	Pabellón Pedro Ferrándiz	Alcoy	(Spain) Roberto Morentin	Fórum Valladolid, Fuenlabrada, Barcelona, Pamesa Valencia, Real Madrid, Joventut Badalona, Casademont Girona, Unicaja
2001 (II)	June 12-15	Caprabo Lleida	82-81	Tau Cerámica	Polideportivo Fernando Martín	Fuenlabrada	(Spain) Roger Grimau	Caprabo Lleida, Tau Cerámica, Cáceres C.B., Real Madrid, Ourense, Fuenlabrada, Baloncesto León, Canarias Telecom
2002 (I)	June 5-8	Unicaja	77-67	Pamesa Valencia	Pabellón Pedro Ferrándiz	Alcoy	(Spain) José Antonio Rojas	Casademont Girona, Cáceres C.B., Pamesa Valencia, Breogan, Unicaja, DKV Joventut, Barcelona, Fuenlabrada
2002 (II)	June 25-28	ACB Blacks	89-74	Jabones Pardo Fuenlabrada	Polideportivo Fernando Martín	Fuenlabrada	(Spain) Roger Grimau	ACB Reds, ACB Whites, ACB Blacks, ACB Greens, Cáceres C.B., Breogán, Gran Canaria, Jabones Pardo Fuenlabrada
2003 (I)	June 4-7	Ricoh Manresa	86-76	Pamesa Valencia	Pabellón Pedro Ferrándiz	Alcoy	(Spain) Eduard Riu	Pamesa Valencia, Fuenlabrada, DKV Joventut, Caprabo Lleida, Barcelona, Casademont Girona, Ricoh Manresa, Lucentum Alicante
2003 (II)	June 11-14	Fórum Valladolid	88-81	Jabones Pardo Fuenlabrada	Polideportivo Fernando Martín	Fuenlabrada	(Spain) Yohann Sangaré	Caja San Fernando, Venezuela Youth national team, Fórum Valladolid, Granada, Barcelona, Unicaja, Fuenlabrada, Breogán
2004	June 15-20	Pollença (Caprabo Lleida)	85-81	Pamesa Valencia	Palau Municipal d'Esports d'Inca	Inca	(Brazil) Marcus Vinicius	Pamesa Valencia, Barcelona, DKV Joventut, Unicaja, Pollença (Caprabo Lleida), Inca (Casademont Girona), Sa Pobla (C.B. Gran Canaria), Alcúdia (Ricoh Manresa)
2005	June 30 - July 2	Gran Canaria Grupo Dunas	81-67	CB Granada	Palau Municipal d'Esports d'Inca	Inca	(Spain) Javier Alvarado	

U20 Editions

Year	Winner	Venue	Location	MVP
2006	MMT Estudiantes	Palau Municipal d'Esports d'Inca	Inca	(Spain) Alberto Aspe Ortiz (Estudiantes)
2007	MMT Estudiantes	Palau Municipal d'Esports d'Inca	Inca	(Spain) Javier Beirán (Estudiantes)
2008	Real Madrid	Palau Municipal d'Esports d'Inca	Inca	(Spain) Pablo Aguilar (Real Madrid)

== Titles by team ==
Team	Winners	Runners-up	Winning editions
Málaga	5	1	1994, 1995 (I), 1999 (I), 2000 (II), 2002 (I)
Manresa	3	-	1996 (I), 1998 (I), 2000 (I)
CB Fuenlabrada	2	2	1996 (II), 1999 (II)
Fórum Valladolid	2	1	2001 (I), 2003 (II)
Joventut	2	1	1997 (I), 1997 (II)
Lleida	1	-	2004
CB Salamanca	1	-	1995 (II)
Spain national team B	1	-	1998 (II)
Gran Canaria	1	-	2005
Barcelona	-	3	
Baskonia	-	1	
Valencia Basket	-	5	
Baloncesto León	-	2	
Club Ourense Baloncesto	-	1	
CB Peñas Huesca	-	1	
CB Granada	-	1	
CB Estudiantes	2*		2006, 2007 (U-20)
Real Madrid Hesperia	1*		2008 (U-20)

== Topscorers ==
=== Per edition ===
Edition	Player	Team
1994	(United States) James Bryson	Coren Orense
1995 (I)	(United States) Gary Gray	Unicaja
1995 (II)	(Spain) Sergio Luyk	Fórum Valladolid
1996 (I)	(United States) Roosvelt Wallace	TDK Manresa
1996 (II)	(Spain) Berni Alvarez	Pamesa Valencia
1997 (I)	(Spain) César Sanmartín	Joventut Badalona
1997 (II)	(Spain) Berni Alvarez (2)	Pamesa Valencia
1998 (I)	(Spain) Josep Pacreu	Joventut Badalona
1998 (II)	(United States) Thomas McGhee	Covirán Sierra Nevada Granada
1999 (I)	(Spain) Pau Gasol	Barcelona FC
1999 (II)	(Spain) Raül López	Joventut Badalona
2000 (I)	(Spain) Jorge Sotomayor	TDK Manresa
2000 (II)	(Spain) Javi Rodríguez	Tau Cerámica
2001 (I)	(Spain) Sergio Pérez Anagnostou	Fuenlabrada
2001 (II)	(Spain) Albert Berenguer	Cáceres C.B.
2002 (I)	(Spain) José Antonio Rojas	Unicaja Malaga

== Contests ==
=== Three-Point Shoot ===
Year	Player	Team
1994	(United States) J.J. Martín	Elmar León
1995 (I)	(Spain) Roberto Carnero	Coren Orense
1996 (I)	(Spain) Valentí Holgado	TDK Manresa
1997 (I)	(Spain) Berni Alvarez	TDK Manresa
1998 (I)	(Spain) Nacho Ordín	León Caja España
1999 (I)	(Spain) Jerónimo Bucero	Girona Gavis
2000 (I)	(Spain) Alejandro González	León Caja España
2001 (I)	(Spain) David Viñas	Barcelona
2002 (I)	(Spain) Alvaro Palacios	Jabones Pardo Fuenlabrada

=== Slam-dunk ===
Year	Player	Team
1994	(United States) Ron Rembert	Pamesa Valencia
1995 (I)	(United States) Roosvelt Wallace	Baloncesto León
1996 (I)	(United States) Roosvelt Wallace (2)	TDK Manresa
1997 (I)	(Spain) Jesús Chagoyen	León Caja España
1998 (I)	(Spain) Lluís Martínez	Valvi Girona
1999 (I)	(Spain) Oriol Rabert	Girona Gavis
2000 (I)	(Spain) Juan Antonio Jobacho	Barcelona

== Home arenas ==
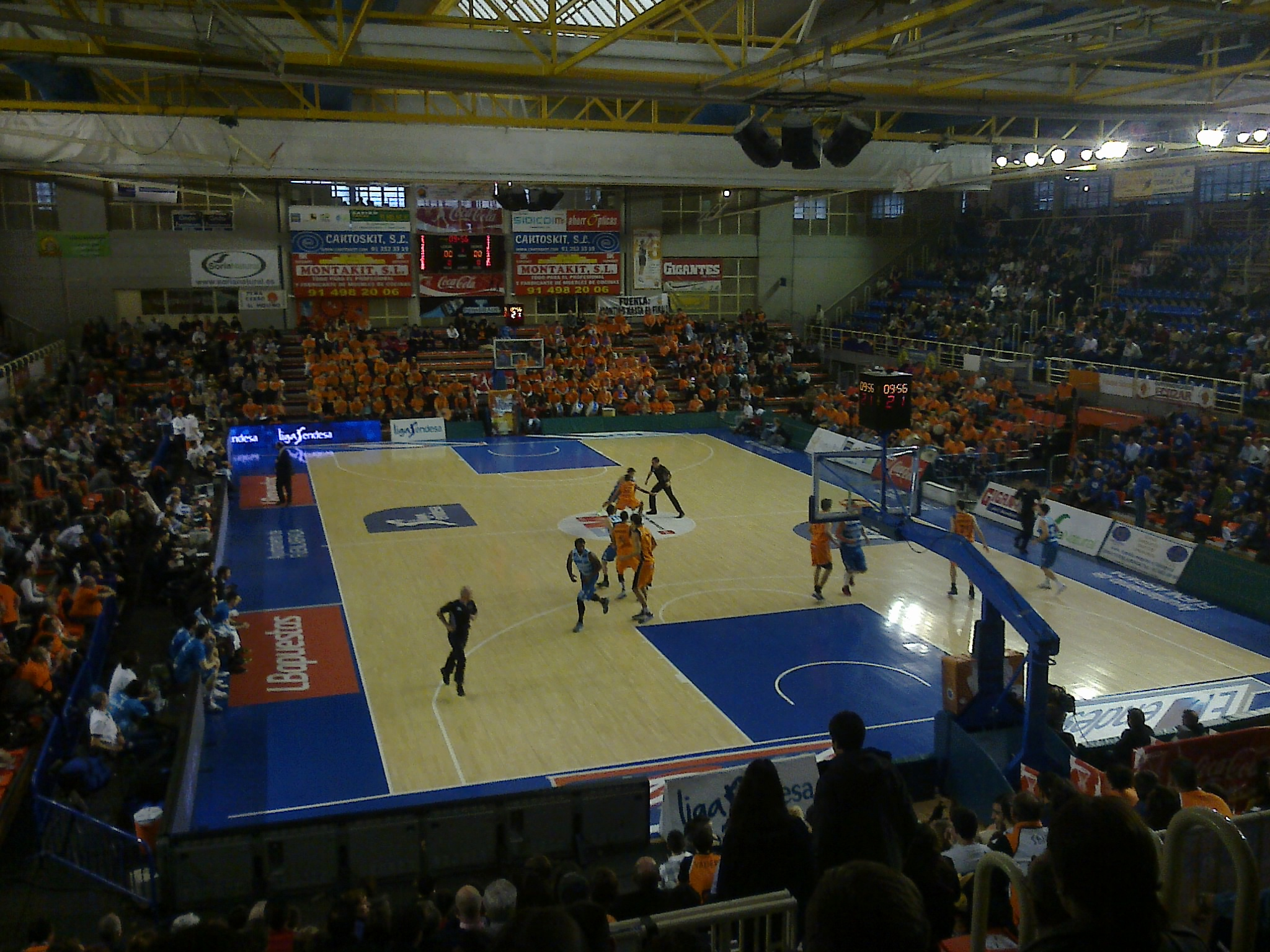
The tournament was held at the Polideportivo Fernando Martín for first time in 1995.

Most of the editions were played at Polideportivo Fernando Martín (Note: In the memory of Fernando Martín) in Fuenlabrada and Pabellón Pedro Ferrándiz in Alcoy.

== See also ==
- ACB Contests
- Liga ACB Presentation Games
- Copa del Rey de Baloncesto

== Sources ==
- Palmarés de las Ligas de Verano ACB
