= Miquel Feliu =

Spanish basketball player

Personal information
- Born: 17 May 1985 (age 41) Manresa, Spain
- Listed height: 1.98 m (6 ft 6 in)
- Listed weight: 235 lb (107 kg)

Career information
- NBA draft: 2007: undrafted
- Playing career: 2002–2021
- Position: Small forward

Career history
- 2002–2010: Manresa
- 2003–2004: →Olesa
- 2004–2006: →L'Hospitalet
- 2007–2008: →Palma Aqua Mágica
- 2008–2009: →Vic
- 2009–2010: →Sant Josep Girona
- 2010–2011: Obradoiro
- 2011–2012: Lleida
- 2012–2013: Força Lleida
- 2013–2014: Palencia
- 2014–2015: Burgos
- 2015–2016: Palma
- 2016–2021: Força Lleida

Career highlights
- 2x LEB Oro champion (2007, 2015); Copa Princesa de Asturias champion (2011)
Medals
Men's basketball
Representing Spain
U16 European Championship
Bronze medal – third place	2001 Latvia	Team

Miquel Feliu Badal (born 17 May 1985), commonly known as Miki Feliu, is a former Spanish professional basketball player. At the 2018–19 season start he was the seventh player with more games (447) in the Spanish second tier.

== Career ==
=== Manresa ===
Played for the Bàsquet Manresa academy and made his professional debut on 28 September 2002, playing 7 minutes on a Liga ACB game against CB Gran Canaria. He played five more games on the 2002–03 season. Spent the next years playing for the farm teams Olesa and CB L'Hospitalet, and 9 games for Manresa on the 2004–05 season. Member of the first team after the relegation to LEB Oro, was loaned to CB Alcúdia, CB Vic and CB Sant Josep after a two years of contract extension.

=== LEB Oro ===
After leaving Manresa, he joined Obradoiro CAB on 2010. The team was promoted to Liga ACB, second achievement for Feliu since 2007 with Manresa. Joined CE Lleida Bàsquet on 2011, the last year of the team on competition, and Força Lleida CE on 2012, spending only one season. He also played for Palencia Baloncesto and CB Tizona, becoming LEB Oro champion for second time. After one season back to Palma, he returned to Força Lleida.

== National team ==
Feliu played for the Spanish men's national team on the 2001 FIBA Europe Under-16 Championship, scoring 27 points in the bronze medal game against Lithuania. Also a member of the team on the 2002 FIBA Europe Under-18 Championship and 2005 FIBA Europe Under-20 Championship.
