= 2003–04 ULEB Cup Top 16 =

== Eighth-final 1 ==
	Home team	Score	Away team	Venue	Date
Game 1	Makedonikos (Greece)	89 - 63	(Spain) Caprabo Lleida	Kozani	February 10, 2004
Game 2	Caprabo Lleida (Spain)	89 - 58	(Greece) Makedonikos	Lleida	February 17, 2004

== Eighth-final 2 ==
	Home team	Score	Away team	Venue	Date
Game 1	Wallone Charleroi (Belgium)	56 - 74	(Spain) Adecco Estudiantes	Charleroi	February 10, 2004
Game 2	Adecco Estudiantes (Spain)	84 - 91	(Belgium) Wallone Charleroi	Madrid	February 17, 2004

== Eighth-final 3 ==
	Home team	Score	Away team	Venue	Date
Game 1	Real Madrid (Spain)	87 - 68	(Spain) Auna Gran Canaria	Madrid	February 10, 2004
Game 2	Auna Gran Canaria (Spain)	63 - 61	(Spain) Real Madrid	Las Palmas	February 17, 2004

== Eighth-final 4 ==
	Home team	Score	Away team	Venue	Date
Game 1	RheinEnergie Cologne (Germany)	81 - 70	(Italy) Metis Varese	Cologne	February 10, 2004
Game 2	Metis Varese (Italy)	81 - 62	(Germany) RheinEnergie Cologne	Varese	February 17, 2004

== Eighth-final 5 ==
	Home team	Score	Away team	Venue	Date
Game 1	BK Ventspils (Latvia)	68 - 79	(Serbia and Montenegro) BC Reflex	Ventspils	February 10, 2004
Game 2	BC Reflex (Serbia and Montenegro)	95 - 89	(Latvia) BK Ventspils	Belgrade	February 17, 2004

== Eighth-final 6 ==
	Home team	Score	Away team	Venue	Date
Game 1	DKV Joventut (Spain)	78 - 62	(Italy) Breil Milano	Badalona	February 10, 2004
Game 2	Breil Milano (Italy)	81 - 69	(Spain) DKV Joventut	Milan	February 17, 2004

== Eighth-final 7 ==
	Home team	Score	Away team	Venue	Date
Game 1	Hapoel Jerusalem (Israel)	77 - 67	(Poland) Prokom Trefl Sopot	Jerusalem	February 10, 2004
Game 2	Prokom Trefl Sopot (Poland)	86 - 82	(Israel) Hapoel Jerusalem	Sopot	February 17, 2004

== Eighth-final 8 ==
	Home team	Score	Away team	Venue	Date
Game 1	Lukoil Academic (Bulgaria)	77 - 80	(Lithuania) Lietuvos Rytas	Sofia	February 10, 2004
Game 1	Lietuvos Rytas (Lithuania)	105 - 78	(Bulgaria) Lukoil Academic	Vilnius	February 17, 2004
