= 2003–04 ULEB Cup Quarter finals =

== Quarter-final 1 ==
	Home team	Score	Away team	Venue	Date
Game 1	Hapoel Jerusalem (Israel)	79 - 72	(Lithuania) Lietuvos Rytas	Jerusalem	March 2, 2004
Game 2	Lietuvos Rytas (Lithuania)	81 - 80	(Israel) Hapoel Jerusalem	Vilnius	March 9, 2004

== Quarter-final 2 ==
	Home team	Score	Away team	Venue	Date
Game 1	Caprabo Lleida (Spain)	82 - 73	(Spain) Adecco Estudiantes	Lleida	March 2, 2004
Game 2	Adecco Estudiantes (Spain)	96 - 68	(Spain) Caprabo Lleida	Madrid	March 9, 2004

== Quarter-final 3 ==
	Home team	Score	Away team	Venue	Date
Game 1	Real Madrid (Spain)	68 - 67	(Italy) Metis Varese	Madrid	March 2, 2004
Game 2	Metis Varese (Italy)	57 - 62	(Spain) Real Madrid	Varese	March 9, 2004

== Quarter-final 4 ==
	Home team	Score	Away team	Venue	Date
Game 1	BC Reflex (Serbia and Montenegro)	81 - 73	(Spain) DKV Joventut	Belgrade	March 2, 2004
Game 2	DKV Joventut (Spain)	83 - 79	(Serbia and Montenegro) BC Reflex	Badalona	March 9, 2004
