= Lleida (disambiguation) =

Lleida may be:

- Lleida, a city in the west of Catalonia, Spain.
- Lleida (province), a province of Catalonia, Spain.
- UE Lleida, a football club based in Lleida, Catalonia.
- CE Lleida Bàsquet, a basketball club based in Lleida, Catalonia.
