= Cantabria autonomous basketball team =

Basketball team of Cantabria, Spain

Cantabria
- National federation: Cantabrian Basketball Federation
- Coach: J. Romano; P. Béjar; Á. Abascal; P. Chico
Home	Away

The Cantabria autonomous basketball team is the basketball team of Cantabria. The team is not affiliated to FIBA, so only plays friendly games.

== History ==
Cantabria played its first friendly game on 9 July 2012, against Senegal.

== Roster ==
This is the roster of the Cantabria team for the 2012 game.

Cantabria Basketball Team roster
Players
Coaches

Pos.	No.	Name	Age – Date of birth	Height	Club	Ctr.
		Jaime García	–		CB Burriana	(Spain)
PG		David García Peña	32 – 25 February 1980	1.85 m (6 ft 1 in)	Pas Piélagos	(Cantabria)
SG		Alberto Miguel	35 – 29 May 1977	1.88 m (6 ft 2 in)	Club Ourense Baloncesto	(Spain)
		Dani Gómez	–		CD La Paz	(Cantabria)
SF		Pablo Sánchez	31 – 15 March 1981	1.96 m (6 ft 5 in)	BC Andorra	(Andorra)
		Paco Masa	–
		Carlos Iradier	–
PF		Raúl Respuela	40 – 1 March 1972		CD La Paz	(Cantabria)
PF		Álvaro Lombera	27 – 14 August 1984	2.01 m (6 ft 7 in)	CD Estela	(Cantabria)
		Miguel Jenaro	–		SAB Torrelavega	(Cantabria)
PF		Edu Ruiz	28 – 28 August 1983	2.05 m (6 ft 9 in)	CB Granada	(Spain)
		Juanma Fernández	–		SAB Torrelavega	(Cantabria)

Head coach

- (Cantabria) Joaquín Romano
- (Cantabria) Pope Béjar
- (Cantabria) Ángel Abascal
- (Cantabria) Pablo Chico

Legend

- (C) Team captain
- Club field describes pro club
  during the 2011–12 season

== Games played ==
9 July 2012	Cantabria	71–90	Senegal	Santander
20:00
		Report		Arena: Polideportivo La Albericia
