= Oriol Jorge =

Spanish basketball player

Personal information
- Born: May 23, 1990 (age 34); Lleida, Spain
- Listed height: 6 ft 3 in (1.91 m)
- Listed weight: 154 lb (70 kg)

Career information
- Playing career: 2008–present
- Position: Point guard

Career history
- 2006–2008: Plus Pujol Lleida youth team
- 2008–2009: CB Monzón
- 2009–2012: Plus Pujol Lleida

Oriol Jorge Graells (born May 23, 1990 in Lleida) is a Spanish professional basketball player. He currently plays for Plus Pujol Lleida of the Spanish LEB Oro.

== Honours ==
Plus Pujol Lleida

- LEB Catalan League Champion: 1
  - 2008
