= Leo Mainoldi =

Argentine-Italian basketball player

No. 19 – Obras Sanitarias
- Position: Power forward
- League: LNB

Personal information
- Born: March 4, 1985 (age 41) Cañada de Gómez, Argentina
- Listed height: 6 ft 8.5 in (2.04 m)
- Listed weight: 240 lb (109 kg)

Career information
- NBA draft: 2007: undrafted
- Playing career: 2001–present

Career history
- 2001–2002: Atlético Carcarañá
- 2002–2005: Pamesa Valencia
- 2004–2005: → Pamesa Castellón
- 2005–2006: Autocid Burgos
- 2006–2008: Plus Pujol Lleida
- 2008–2013: Alta Gestión Fuenlabrada
- 2013–2014: Laboral Kutxa
- 2015: Quimsa
- 2015–2016: Gimnasia y Esgrima (CR)
- 2016–2018: San Martín
- 2018–2021: Quimsa
- 2021–2022: San Martín
- 2022–2024: Boca Juniors
- 2024: San Martín (C)
- 2024: Ciclista Olímpico
- 2024–present: Obras Sanitarias

Career highlights
- Spanish 3rd Division champion (2006); Spanish 3rd Cup winner (2006); Catalan 2nd Division champion (2007)
Medals
Men's basketball
Representing Argentina
FIBA AmeriCup
Silver medal – second place	2015 Mexico City
Bronze medal – third place	2009 San Juan
Bronze medal – third place	2013 Venezuela
FIBA South American Championship
Gold medal – first place	2008 Puerto Montt
Silver medal – second place	2010 Neiva
Bronze medal – third place	2006 Caracas

Leonardo "Leo" Andrés Mainoldi (born March 4, 1985), is an Argentine professional basketball player. He is 6 ft 8 1/2 in (2.04 m) tall. He plays at the power forward position.

== Professional career ==
On September 1, 2013, Mainoldi signed a one-year deal with the Spanish EuroLeague club Laboral Kutxa.

== National team career ==
Mainoldi has been a member of the senior men's Argentina national basketball team. He won the bronze medal at the 2009 FIBA Americas Championship, the bronze medal at the 2013 FIBA Americas Championship, and the silver medal at the 2015 FIBA Americas Championship.

He also played at the 2016 Summer Olympics.

== Honors and awards ==
Ford Burgos

- Spanish 3rd Division Champion
  - 2006
- Spanish 3rd Cup Winner
  - 2006

Plus Pujol Lleida

- Catalan 2nd Division Champion
  - 2007

Argentine national team

- South American Under-21 Championship: Gold
  - 2004
- South American Championship: Bronze
  - 2006
- South American Championship: Gold
  - 2008
- FIBA Americas Championship: Bronze
  - 2009
- South American Championship: Silver
  - 2010
- FIBA Americas Championship: Bronze
  - 2013
- FIBA Americas Championship: Silver
  - 2015

== Personal life ==
Leonardo has an older brother, Carlos, who is also a professional basketball player.
