= Gimel Lewis =

Trinidad and Tobago basketball player

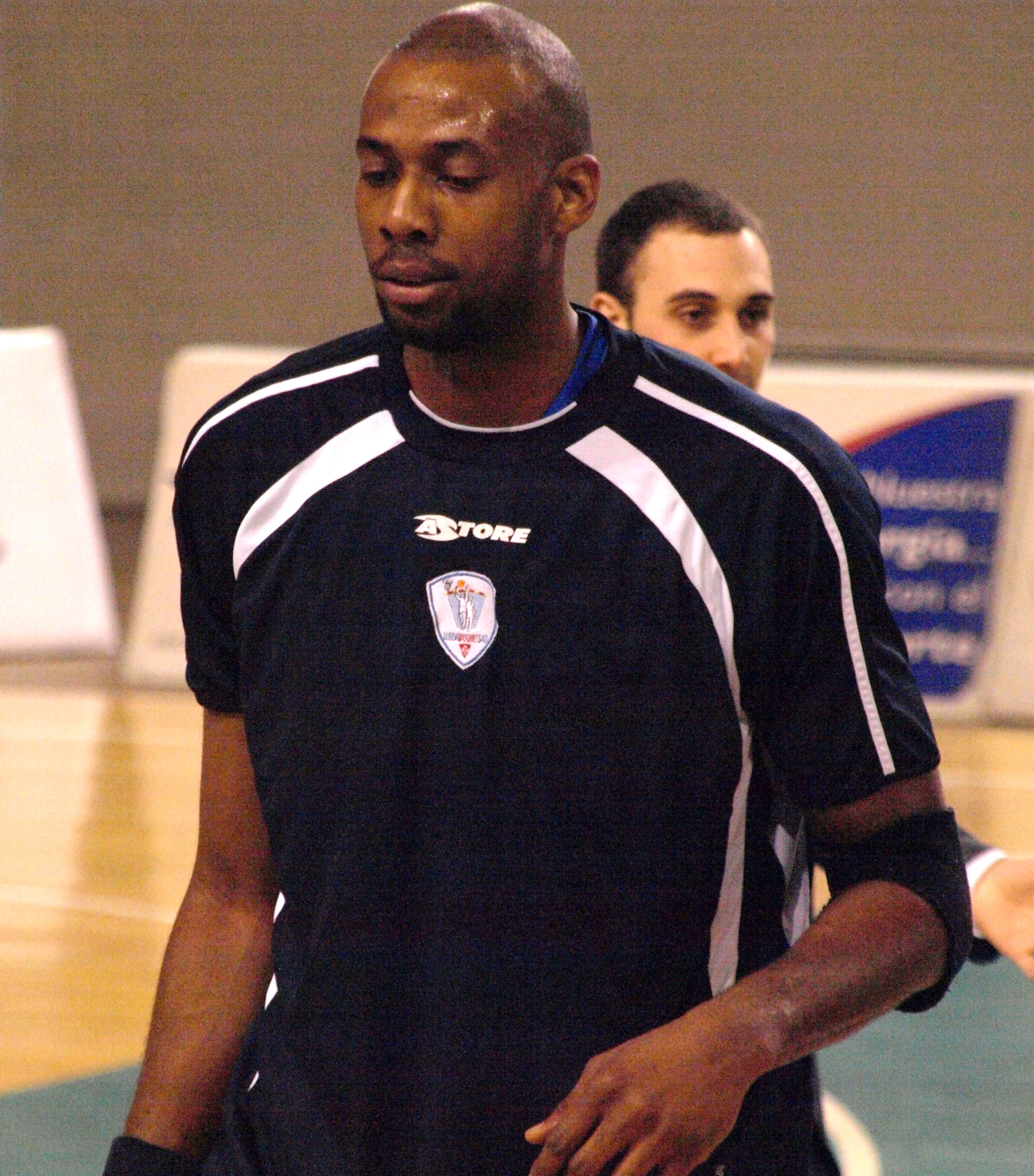

Faymasa Palencia
- Position: Center

Personal information
- Born: October 27, 1982 (age 43) Arima, Trinidad and Tobago
- Listed height: 6 ft 11 in (2.11 m)
- Listed weight: 245 lb (111 kg)

Career information
- Playing career: 2005–present

Gimel Joseph Lewis (born October 27, 1982, in Arima) is a Trinidadian professional basketball player.

== Playing career ==
- 2002/03 (Trinidad and Tobago) Maloney Pacers
- 2003/05 (United States) Mobile Rams
- 2005/06 (Spain) Ciudad de La Laguna
- 2006/07 (Spain) Alerta Cantabria
- 2007/08 (Spain) Tenerife Rural
- 2008/09 (Spain) Plus Pujol Lleida
- 2009/10 (Spain) Faymasa Palencia

== Honours ==
Plus Pujol Lleida

- LEB Catalan League Champion: 1
  - 2008
