= Manel Bosch =

Spanish professional basketball player

Personal information
- Born: September 19, 1967 (age 59) Lleida, Spain
- Listed height: 6 ft 6 in (1.98 m)
- Listed weight: 216 lb (98 kg)

Career information
- Playing career: 1983–2003
- Position: Forward
Medals
Representing Spain
Men's Basketball
EuroBasket
Bronze medal – third place	1991 Italy

Manel Bosch Bifet (born September 19, 1967, in Lleida) was a Spanish professional basketball player.

== Playing career ==
- 1982/83 (Spain) Maristes Lleida (youth team)
- 1983/84 (Spain) Antorcha
- 1984/85 (Spain) UE Lleida
- 1985/89 (Spain) Espanyol
- 1989/90 (Spain) Gijón Baloncesto
- 1990/91 (Spain) Granollers
- 1991/92 (Spain) CAI Zaragoza
- 1992/95 (Spain) Unicaja Málaga
- 1995/97 (Spain) FC Barcelona
- 1997/99 (Spain) Caja San Fernando
- 1999/01 (Spain) Cantabria Lobos
- 2001/03 (Spain) Caprabo Lleida

== Honours ==
FC Barcelona

- ACB Champion: 2
  - 1996, 1997

Plus Pujol Lleida

- ACB Catalan League Champion: 1
  - 2002

Spain

- Eurobasket Bronze Medal: 1
  - 1991
