= Berni Tamames =

Spanish basketball player

Personal information
- Born: August 15, 1973 (age 52) Lleida, Spain
- Listed height: 6 ft 10 in (2.08 m)
- Listed weight: 236 lb (107 kg)

Career information
- Playing career: 1992–2007
- Position: Center

Bernardino Tamames Alonso (born August 15, 1973 in Lleida) was a Spanish basketball player. He currently works as a Guardia Urbana officer in Lleida.

== Playing career ==
- 1991/92 (Spain) FC Barcelona B
- 1992/95 (Spain) FC Barcelona Banca Catalana
- 1995/96 Festina Andorra
- 1996/00 (Spain) Gran Canaria
- 2000/01 (Spain) Caja San Fernando
- 2001/07 (Spain) Plus Pujol Lleida

== Honours ==
FC Barcelona

- ACB Champion: 1
  - 1995

Plus Pujol Lleida

- ACB Catalan League Champion: 2
  - 2002, 2003

Spain

- Universiade Bronze Medal: 1
  - 1999
