= Brian Jones (basketball, born 1978) =

American basketball player

Personal information
- Born: January 17, 1978 (age 48) Los Angeles, California
- Listed height: 6 ft 3 in (1.91 m)
- Listed weight: 209 lb (95 kg)

Career information
- High school: Banning (Los Angeles, California)
- College: Santa Clara (1996–2001)
- NBA draft: 2001: undrafted
- Position: Point guard

Career history
- 2003–2005: Tigers Tübingen
- 2005–2007: Eisbären Bremerhaven
- 2007–2008: Plus Pujol Lleida
- 2008–2009: EnBW Ludwigsburg

Brian Jamaal Jones (born January 17, 1978) is an American professional basketball who played for EnBW Ludwigsburg of the Basketball Bundesliga league. He played college basketball at Santa Clara.

In his third college game, Jones set the school's freshman record by scoring 34 points in a 79–72 win over Marquette.

== Playing career ==
- 1996–2001 (United States) Santa Clara Broncos
- 2003–2005 (Germany) Walter Tigers Tübingen
- 2005–2007 (Germany) Eisbären Bremerhaven
- 2007–2008 (Spain) Plus Pujol Lleida
- 2008–2009 (Germany) EnBW Ludwigsburg

== Honours ==
Walter Tigers Tübingen

- 2.Bundesliga ProA Champion
  - 2006
