= Alfons Alzamora =

Spanish professional basketball player

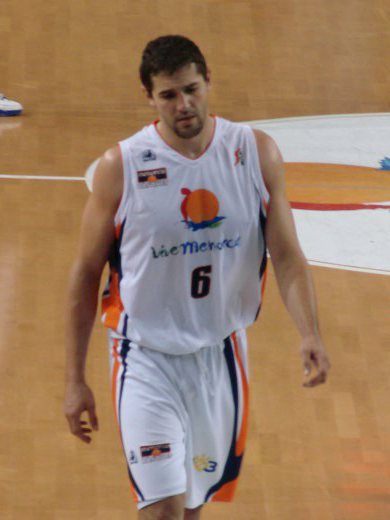

Personal information
- Born: May 20, 1979 (age 47) Palma de Mallorca, Spain
- Listed height: 6 ft 9 in (2.06 m)
- Listed weight: 236 lb (107 kg)

Career information
- Playing career: 1999–2021
- Position: Center

Career history
- 1999–2000: FC Barcelona
- 2000–2001: Lleida Bàsquet
- 2001–2003: FC Barcelona
- 2003–2004: Joventut Badalona
- 2004–2006: Río Breogán
- 2006–2007: Vive Menorca
- 2007–2011: Bàsquet Manresa
- 2011–2012: Lleida Bàsquet
- 2012–2013: FC Barcelona B
- 2013–2017: Força Lleida
- 2017–2019: Bàsquet Girona
- 2019–2020: CB Vic
- 2020–2021: CB Boet Maresme

Career highlights
- Euroleague champion (2003)

Alfons Alzamora Ametller (born May 20, 1979) is a Spanish former professional basketball player. He spent most of his career with clubs based in Catalonia. He currently works as youth development staff for FC Barcelona.

== Playing career ==
- 1996/99 (Spain) FC Barcelona (youth team)
- 1999/00 (Spain) FC Barcelona
- 2000/01 (Spain) Caprabo Lleida
- 2001/03 (Spain) FC Barcelona
- 2003/04 (Spain) DKV Joventut
- 2004/06 (Spain) Leche Río Breogán
- 2006/07 (Spain) Vive Menorca
- 2007/11 (Spain) Ricoh Manresa
- 2011/12 (Spain) Lleida Bàsquet
- 2012/13 (Spain) FC Barcelona Regal B
- 2013/17 (Spain) Força Lleida
- 2017/ (Spain) Bàsquet Girona

== Honours ==
Spain

- Mediterranean Games Gold Medal: 1
  - 2001

FC Barcelona

- Euroleague: 1
  - 2003
- Korać Cup: 1
  - 1999
- ACB: 1
  - 2003
- Copa del Rey: 1
  - 2003

Caprabo Lleida

- LEB: 1
  - 2001
