= Troy DeVries =

American basketball player (born 1982)

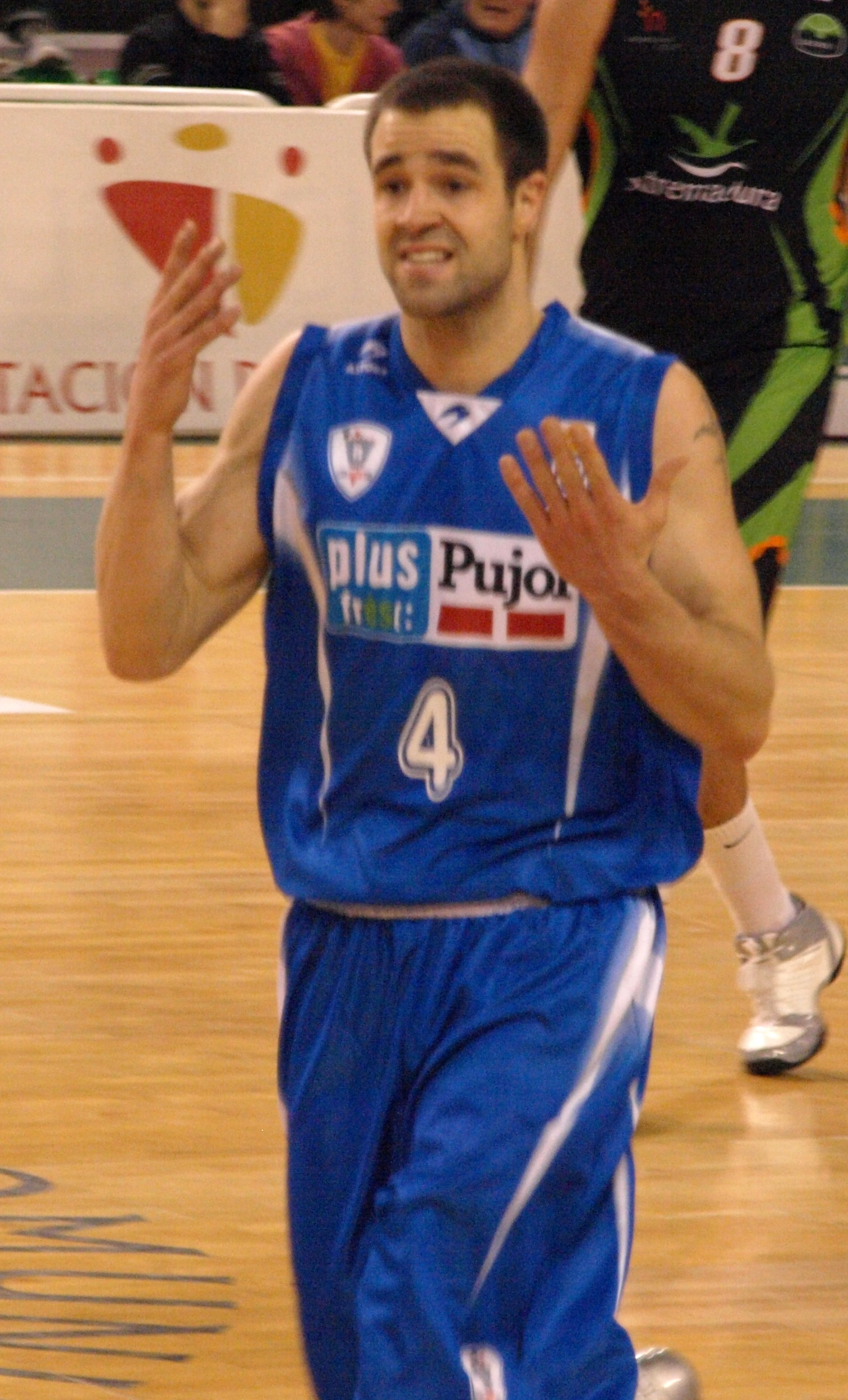

Personal information
- Born: July 27, 1982 (age 44) Mount Vernon, Washington, U.S.
- Listed height: 6 ft 4 in (1.93 m)
- Listed weight: 200 lb (91 kg)

Career information
- High school: Mount Vernon (Mount Vernon, Washington)
- College: Portland State (2001–2003); New Mexico (2003–2005)
- NBA draft: 2005: undrafted
- Playing career: 2005–2017
- Position: Shooting guard

Career history
- 2005–2006: BG Karlsruhe
- 2007–2008: West Sydney Razorbacks
- 2007–2008: Sumykhimprom Sumy
- 2008–2009: Plus Pujol Lleida
- 2009–2010: Sant Josep Girona
- 2010–2011: Adelaide 36ers
- 2011–2012: Melilla Baloncesto
- 2012: Unicaja
- 2012–2013: Bàsquet Manresa
- 2013–2016: Torku Selçuk Üniversitesi / Torku Konyaspor
- 2016: FC Porto
- 2016–2017: Los Angeles D-Fenders

Troy Anthony DeVries (born July 27, 1982) is an American former professional basketball player. He played college basketball for the Portland State Vikings and New Mexico Lobos.

== Portland State Career ==
A Guard who transferred from Portland State after the 2002 fall semester. Played in five games at Portland State in the fall of 2002, costing him the entire 2002–03 year of eligibility. Finished as one of the top 3-pt and FG shooters in MWC history. Career 3-pt average of 45.0% is the highest mark in UNM history. His 48.0* career accuracy in MWC games is the highest in MWC history. 147 career 3-pt FGs is tied with Lamont Long for eighth place in UNM history. Hit a 3-pt in 29 consecutive games, the second longest streak in UNM history.

2001–02 Freshman Season (Portland State) Devries saw action in 27 games with six starts and averaged 4.7 ppg and 1.1 assists as a freshman and hit 41.2% of 3-point attempts and was named Academic All-Big Sky.

2002–03 Sophomore Season (Portland State) Played in five games at Portland State, averaged 11.8 ppg and 4.2 rpg but sat out the second semester after transferring to UNM.

== University of New Mexico career ==
=== 2003–04 Junior Season ===
Named honorable mention All-MWC for the 2003–04 season. Devries earned CoSIDA Academic All-District and Academic All-MWC honors in 2003–04 for having over a 3.5 g.p.a as a communications major. Started 21 of 22 games after making his debut against Coppin State on 12–21–03, Averaged 10.7 ppg, 2.9 rpg and 2.95 apg, Shot 44.4% from the field and 44.6% from 3-pt range is 6th all-time for a season at UNM and would have ranked 14th in the NCAA had he made one more 3-pt to qualify.

=== 2004–05 Senior Season ===
Named 3rd Team All-MWC after shooting 45.1% from 3-pt. range, ranking third in the league and fifth highest mark in school history also earned CoSIDA Academic All-District VI honors and MWC Scholar Athlete recognition, MVP of the 2004 Cmcast Lobo Invitational after scoring 49 points on 16–24 shooting, 13–20 from 3-pt range, in the two-game event and made 93 3-pt which is the fourth most in a season at UNM, Averaged 11.0 ppg, 2.4 rpg and 2.5 apg, Was ninth in the NCAA in 3-pt led the MWC with 2.82 3-pt per-game and ranked 38th in the NCAA, Shot 51.3% from 3-pt range in MWC play, the third highest mark in MWC history .

== Professional career ==
=== NBL ===
Joined the West Sydney Razorbacks of the NBL in Australia prior to the 2007/08 season as an import player. DeVries was influential in getting the Razorbacks off the bottom of the ladder. He was in the top 20 in the league for 3-pt %, finishing with final statistics of 17.7 ppg, 2.3 assists per game, 2.3 rebounds per game, 44% 3PT, 45% FG, 75.5% FT, averaging 27.8 minutes per game.

DeVries won the 2007–08 NBL All Star Three Point Shootout, beating out Kirk Penney in the finals.

Tied the NBL single game record going a perfect 8–8 from 3PT.

=== D-League ===
On October 30, DeVries was acquired by the Los Angeles D-Fenders.
