= A. J. Bramlett =

American basketball player (born 1977)

Personal information
- Born: January 10, 1977 (age 49) DeKalb, Illinois, U.S.
- Listed height: 6 ft 10 in (2.08 m)
- Listed weight: 227 lb (103 kg)

Career information
- High school: La Cueva (Albuquerque, New Mexico)
- College: Arizona (1995–1999)
- NBA draft: 1999: 2nd round, 39th overall pick
- Drafted by: Cleveland Cavaliers
- Playing career: 1999–2008
- Position: Center
- Number: 42, 4

Career history
- 1999: Dafni
- 1999–2000: Cleveland Cavaliers
- 2000: La Crosse Bobcats
- 2000–2001: Forum Valladolid
- 2001–2005: Plus Pujol Lleida
- 2005–2006: Caja San Fernando
- 2006–2008: ASK Riga

Career highlights
- Latvian champion (2007); NCAA champion (1997); First-team All-Pac-10 (1999)
- Stats at NBA.com
- Stats at Basketball Reference

Aaron Jordan Bramlett (born January 10, 1977) is an American former professional basketball player.

Bramlett was a three-year letterman at La Cueva High School in Albuquerque, New Mexico, leading the Bears to a state championship in 1994. He committed to the University of Arizona in 1995 and played for the Wildcats for four years, rising to sixth on the school's career list for rebounding and 25th in scoring. He helped Arizona win the NCAA Men's Division I Basketball Championship in 1997, as well as reach the Sweet Sixteen in 1996, and the Elite Eight in 1998.

In 1999, Bramlett was taken by the Cleveland Cavaliers in the second round of the 1999 NBA draft. Bramlett played only eight games with Cleveland, and was waived in January 2000. He also saw action in 35 CBA contests during the 1999–2000 season, playing for the La Crosse Bobcats.

He joined Grupo Capitol Valladolid in the Spanish Liga ACB for the 2000-01 campaign, and in 2001 moved to Caprabo Lleida (now Plus Pujol Lleida). Until 2006, he appeared in a total of 185 ACB games, most of them representing Lleida. In 2007, he captured the Latvian national championship with ASK Riga and received 2006-07 All-Latvijas Basketbola līga Center of the Year honors (by eurobasket.com).

After his playing career, Bramlett stayed close to the game, working in youth basketball and for a company which holds the marketing rights for the New Mexico Activities Association and the University of New Mexico Lobos.
