= Roger Grimau =

Spanish basketball player

- Grimau in 2026

Bursaspor
- Title: Head coach
- League: Basketbol Süper Ligi

Personal information
- Born: 14 July 1978 (age 48) Barcelona, Spain
- Listed height: 6 ft 5 in (1.96 m)
- Listed weight: 210 lb (95 kg)

Career information
- Playing career: 1996–2015
- Position: Guard / small forward
- Coaching career: 2016–present

Career history

Playing
- 1996–1999: Joventut Badalona
- 1999–2003: Lleida
- 2003–2011: FC Barcelona
- 2011–2014: Bilbao Basket
- 2014–2015: Manresa

Coaching
- 2016–2023: JAC Sants
- 2023–2024: Barcelona
- 2024–2025: Dinamo București
- 2026–present: Bursaspor

Career highlights
- Euroleague champion (2010)
Medals
Representing Spain
Men's Basketball
Mediterranean Games
Gold medal – first place	2001 Tunis	National Team
FIBA EuroBasket
Silver medal – second place	2003 Sweden	National Team

Roger Grimau Gragera (born 14 July 1978) is a Spanish professional basketball coach and former player, currently serving as the head coach for Bursasporr in the Basketbol Süper Ligi (BSL). During his playing days, he was a 1.96 m (6 ft 5 in) tall swingman, that could also play as a point guard.

== Professional career ==
Grimau quickly moved to continue a family legacy in the world of basketball. Like his father before him, and as his two younger siblings who would follow suit, Roger rose to the ranks as a professional basketball player.

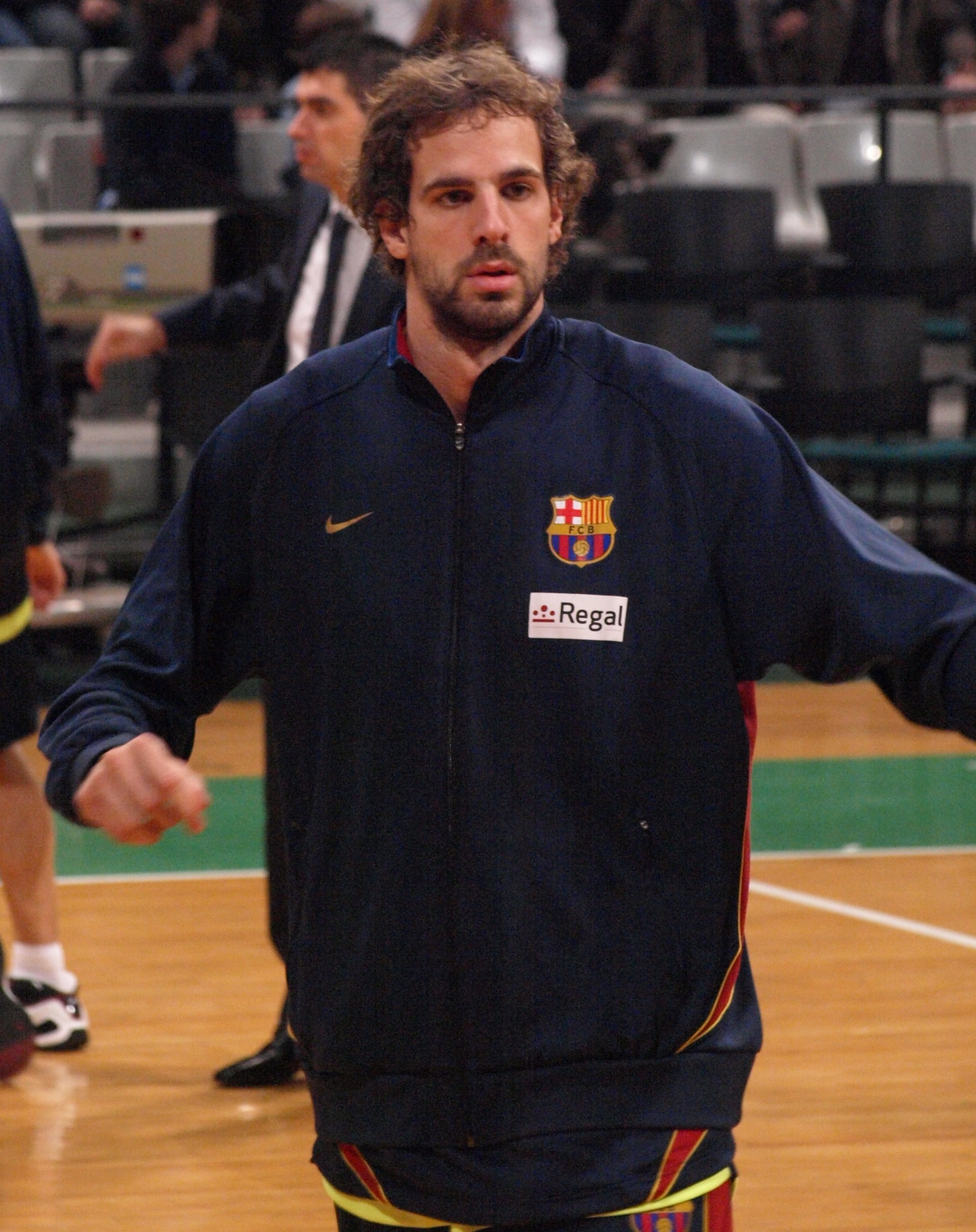
Grimau warming up with FC Barcelona

At Lleida, he propelled his team to the Liga ACB, Spanish basketball's premier division. He was the undoubted star of a young team which won promotion to the league. As well as being named an all-star in their promotion season, he also earned a move to his next club, FC Barcelona and with it, a call up to the Spain national team, with whom he won a gold medal at the 2001 Mediterranean Games.

In July 2011, he signed a two-year contract with Bilbao Basket. He stayed in the club until September 2014.

In June 2015, Grimau decided to retire from basketball.

== Spain national team ==
Grimau has also been a member of the Spain national basketball team. He won the gold medal at the 2001 Mediterranean games, and the silver medal at the EuroBasket 2003.

== Coaching career ==
After his retirement, for the 2015–16 season, Grimau started his coach career as assistant coach of Catalana amateur club CB Sant Just. One year later, he signed with Liga EBA club JAC Sants for his first experience as head coach.

On 26 June 2023, Grimau was appointed head coach of FC Barcelona, replacing Šarūnas Jasikevičius.

On November 5, 2024, he signed with Dinamo București of the Liga Națională.

On March 26, 2026, he signed with Bursaspor Basketbol of the Basketbol Süper Ligi (BSL).

== Career statistics ==
Legend
GP	Games played	GS	Games started	MPG	Minutes per game
FG%	Field-goal percentage	3P%	3-point field-goal percentage	FT%	Free-throw percentage
RPG	Rebounds per game	APG	Assists per game	SPG	Steals per game
BPG	Blocks per game	PPG	Points per game	PIR	Performance index rating
**Bold**	Career high

=== EuroLeague ===
†	Denotes season in which Grimau won the EuroLeague
*	Led the league

Year	Team	GP	GS	MPG	FG%	3P%	FT%	RPG	APG	SPG	BPG	PPG	PIR
2003–04	Barcelona	9	2	18.0	**.571**	.200	.944	2.1	1.1	**1.4**	.1	6.7	8.7
2004–05	Barcelona	16	1	14.7	.484	.250	.833	2.3	.7	.6	.1	5.2	5.1
2005–06	Barcelona	18	0	12.8	.448	.333	**1.000**	.9	.7	.9	.1	4.2	2.8
2006–07	Barcelona	20	0	12.7	.424	**.455**	.680	2.0	1.0	.7	**.2**	4.2	3.7
2007–08	Barcelona	22	1	**21.1**	.479	.373	.816	**3.6**	**1.7**	1.2	**.2**	**9.9**	**10.0**
2008–09	Barcelona	**23***	0	16.1	.515	.304	.816	2.4	.7	.9	**.2**	6.3	6.5
2009–10†	Barcelona	22*	3	13.5	.473	.273	.800	2.1	1.1	.3	.1	4.5	4.9
2010–11	Barcelona	20	**8**	14.8	.500	.308	.643	1.4	.8	.6	**.2**	4.5	2.8
2011–12	Bilbao	20	4	14.2	.392	.263	**1.000**	2.1	.9	.4	.1	4.1	2.7
Career		170	19	15.3	.474	.322	.821	2.1	1.0	.7	.1	5.5	5.1

== Awards and achievements ==
Pro career

- Euroleague Champion:
  - 2009–10
- 3x Spanish League Champion:
  - 2003–04, 2008–09, 2010–11
- 3x Spanish Cup Champion:
  - 2007, 2010, 2011
- 3x Spanish Supercup Champion:
  - 2004, 2009, 2010

Caprabo Lleida

- Spanish 2nd Division Champion:
  - 2001

Spanish national team

- FIBA EuroBasket 2003: Silver
- 2001 Mediterranean Games: Gold
