= 2002–03 ACB season =

2002-03 ACB season
- League: Liga ACB
- Sport: Basketball
- Games: 340
- Teams: 18
- TV partner: Canal+

Regular Season
- Season champions: FC Barcelona
- Season MVP: (Argentina) Walter Herrmann (Jabones Pardo Fuenlabrada)

Playoffs

ACB Finals
- Champions: FC Barcelona
- Runners-up: Pamesa Valencia
- Finals MVP: (Lithuania) Šarūnas Jasikevičius (FC Barcelona)

ACB seasons
- ← 2001–02 2003–04 →

The 2002–03 ACB season was the 20th season of the Liga ACB.

== Regular season ==
Pos	Team	GP	GW	GL	PA	PC	Avg	Qualification or relegation
1	FC Barcelona	34	27	7	2792	2588	+204	Qualified to playoffs
2	Pamesa Valencia	34	26	8	2815	2524	+291	Qualified to playoffs
3	Unicaja Málaga	34	24	10	2663	2567	+96	Qualified to playoffs
4	Adecco Estudiantes	34	23	11	2870	2605	+265	Qualified to playoffs
5	Auna Gran Canaria	34	21	13	2834	2713	+121	Qualified to playoffs
6	TAU Cerámica	34	18	16	2763	2665	+98	Qualified to playoffs
7	DKV Joventut	34	18	16	2849	2753	+96	Qualified to playoffs
8	CB Lucentum Alicante	34	18	16	2745	2716	+29	Qualified to playoffs
9	Leche Río Breogán	34	17	17	2769	2830	-61	
10	Real Madrid	34	17	17	2667	2608	+59	
11	Caprabo Lleida	34	16	18	2730	2819	-89	
12	Caja San Fernando	34	16	18	2722	2687	+35	
13	Ricoh Manresa	34	15	19	2692	2757	-65	
14	Jabones Pardo Fuenlabrada	34	14	20	2740	2881	-141	
15	Casademont Girona	34	12	22	2623	2790	-167	
16	Fórum Valladolid	34	11	23	2625	2789	-164	
17	Cáceres CB	34	8	26	2683	2930	-247	Relegation to LEB
18	CB Granada	34	5	29	2584	2944	-360	Relegation to LEB

=== Regular season games ===
	EST	GCN	CÁC	CSF	LLE	GIR	GRD	LUC	DKV	FCB	FOR	FUE	BRE	PAM	RMA	MAN	TAU	UNI
Adecco Estudiantes	–	98−72	87−86	98−72	88−65	91−57	93−88	80−72	86−77	83−55	79−83	81−90	109−70	81−89	84−72	88−71	76−66	85−62
Auna Gran Canaria	88−71	–	80−63	83−79	92−82	85−66	99−72	85−67	97−94	92−97	95−71	83−63	98−78	79−85	77−66	82−57	80−74	83−81
Cáceres CB	69−74	83−91	–	88−80	77−85	71−64	91−80	97−93	84−76	73−84	78−83	77−79	69−71	80−83	82−92	82−75	78−102	103−111
Caja San Fernando	85−72	76−59	79−76	–	66−73	77−68	98−75	75−83	82−87	93−82	70−68	82−93	84−80	77−80	91−74	104−100	89−70	77−82
Caprabo Lleida	91−78	84−89	79−82	78−69	–	80−75	88−81	87−83	89−115	70−86	80−61	88−100	72−76	64−62	85−69	85−78	66−78	70−77
Casademont Girona	80−88	100−96	93−80	73−80	77−86	–	87−68	89−83	78−84	74−80	73−77	79−73	86−78	75−67	66−83	81−68	87−99	69−81
CB Granada	93−89	86−83	61−65	77−89	69−73	59−62	–	73−80	85−106	66−81	76−70	61−69	93−84	66−89	78−87	83−100	66−88	84−91
CB Lucentum Alicante	60−67	88−89	91−87	84−76	100−96	79−64	105−73	–	70−85	85−75	79−77	87−81	89−85	82−71	83−70	82−51	70−65	76−70
DKV Joventut	70−81	84−77	91−82	74−91	95−97	93−74	91−82	99−93	–	74−77	80−72	94−73	68−59	68−89	74−78	99−80	73−74	70−63
FC Barcelona	80−74	85−78	99−82	84−70	94−88	75−62	93−78	83−80	81−80	–	84−75	93–47	81−72	67−68	92−91	89−83	70−62	65−68
Fórum Valladolid	71−78	76−104	84−79	69−85	88−95	92−90	89−71	72−68	92−98	71−74	–	73−83	78−67	79−100	75−80	78−71	86−78	73−74
J. Pardo Fuenlabrada	102−112	111−98	92−79	91−79	82−94	84−88	107−91	89−82	74−90	71−83	74−67	–	90−94	73−82	75−101	72−65	84−82	78−95
Leche Río Breogán	78−91	78−61	108−96	80−77	91−70	119−109	76−72	84−73	89−77	70−84	95−90	82−72	–	88−77	88−78	111−112	70−69	78−79
Pamesa Valencia	88−81	72−74	98−69	81−69	101−75	89−71	75−73	82−92	75−67	87−74	95−72	92−73	88−70	–	77−76	94−72	78−65	68−69
Real Madrid CF	59−84	72−75	91−58	59−72	89−66	76−78	84−88	86−64	74−71	75−83	80−70	82−75	77−81	74−87	–	65−54	90−82	68−58
Ricoh Manresa	79−72	92−73	91−75	75−71	81−68	84−57	86−66	88−90	101−96	73−71	90−76	83−82	91−81	77−68	72−73	–	70−93	62−73
TAU Cerámica	87−94	94−81	85−65	88−80	84−81	84−79	95−77	86−56	81−75	98−108	82−84	90−76	81−70	74−92	78−96	92−84	–	63−64
Unicaja Málaga	78−77	68−56	98−77	83−78	86−80	81−92	81−73	79−76	73−74	75−83	84−83	72−62	89−68	78−86	85−80	85−76	70−74	–

== Playoffs ==
Quarter Finals
1	FC Barcelona	3
8	CB Lucentum	0
4	Adecco Estudiantes	3
5	Auna Gran Canaria	0
2	Pamesa Valencia	3
7	DKV Joventut	0
3	Unicaja Málaga	3
6	Tau Cerámica	2

SemiFinals
1	FC Barcelona	3
4	Adecco Estudiantes	1
2	Pamesa Valencia	3
3	Unicaja Málaga	2

Finals
1	FC Barcelona	3
2	Pamesa Valencia	0

2002-03 ACB League
FC Barcelona
13th Title

== See also ==
- Liga ACB
