= Kevin Thompson (basketball) =

American basketball player (born 1971)

Personal information
- Born: February 7, 1971 (age 55) Winston-Salem, North Carolina, U.S.
- Listed height: 6 ft 11 in (2.11 m)
- Listed weight: 260 lb (118 kg)

Career information
- High school: Robert B. Glenn (Kernersville, North Carolina)
- College: NC State (1989–1993)
- NBA draft: 1993: 2nd round, 48th overall pick
- Drafted by: Portland Trail Blazers
- Playing career: 1993–2008
- Position: Center
- Number: 35

Career history
- 1993–1994: Portland Trail Blazers
- 1994–1995: Illycaffe Trieste
- 1995–1997: Scavolini Pesaro
- 1997–1999: Beşiktaş
- 1999: Washington Congressionals
- 1999–2000: Viola Reggio Calabria
- 2000–2001: Lineltex Imola
- 2001–2002: Oyak Renault
- 2003: Cáceres CB
- 2003–2004: Fórum Filatélico
- 2004–2006: Casademont / Akasvayu Girona
- 2006–2007: Polaris World Murcia
- 2007–2008: Grupo Begar León
- 2008: Plus Pujol Lleida

Career highlights
- 2× Third-team All-ACC (1992, 1993)
- Stats at NBA.com
- Stats at Basketball Reference

Kevin Lamont Thompson (born February 7, 1971) is an American former professional basketball player. A 6'11" center, he played one NBA season for the Portland Trail Blazers before continuing his career in Europe.

== College career ==
Thompson played college basketball for the NC State Wolfpack from 1989 to 1993.

== Professional career ==
He was 48th overall in the second round of the 1993 NBA draft by the Portland Trail Blazers. Signed by the Trail Blazers, he played one season in the NBA, averaging 0.9 points and 0.9 rebounds in 14 games.

Released by the Trail Blazers, he moved to the Italian Serie A, playing successively for Illycaffe Trieste, Scavolini Pesaro – with whom he led the league in rebounding in 1996–97, Viola Reggio Calabria and Lineltex Imola.

He also played in the United States Basketball League and the Turkish Basketball League, later finishing his career in the Spanish Liga ACB.
