= Jaume Comas =

Spanish basketball player

Personal information
- Born: August 2, 1974 (age 52) Premià de Mar, Spain
- Listed height: 6 ft 1.25 in (1.86 m)
- Listed weight: 185 lb (84 kg)

Career information
- Playing career: 1993–2011
- Position: Point guard

Jaume Comas Font (born 2 August 1974, in Premià de Mar, Spain) is a retired Spanish professional basketball player.

== Player profile ==
At a height of 1.86 m height, Comas was an explosive point guard, with a good 3-point shot, and good passing ability. He was also good at getting steals. He played five seasons in the top division Spanish ACB League, and spent the rest of his career in the second division Spanish LEB League.

== Spain national team ==
As a member of the senior Spain men's national basketball team, Comas played at the 2004 Summer Olympics.

== Teams ==
- 1992-93 (Spain) Joventut Badalona (youth team)
- 1993-94 (Spain) Premià
- 1994-95 (Spain) Mataró
- 1995-97 (Spain) Pineda
- 1997-98 (Spain) Melilla
- 1998-99 (Spain) Badajoz
- 1999-00 (Spain) Lleida Bàsquet
- 1999-00 (Spain) Cantabria Lobos
- 2000-08 (Spain) Lleida Bàsquet
- 2008-09 (Spain) Sant Josep
- 2009-11 (Spain) Prat

== Honors ==
Lleida Bàsquet

- Spanish Second Division Champion: 1
  - 2001
- ACB Catalan Cup Champion: 2
  - 2002, 2003
- LEB Catalan Cup Champion: 1
  - 2007
