= Ricard Casas =

Spanish basketball coach

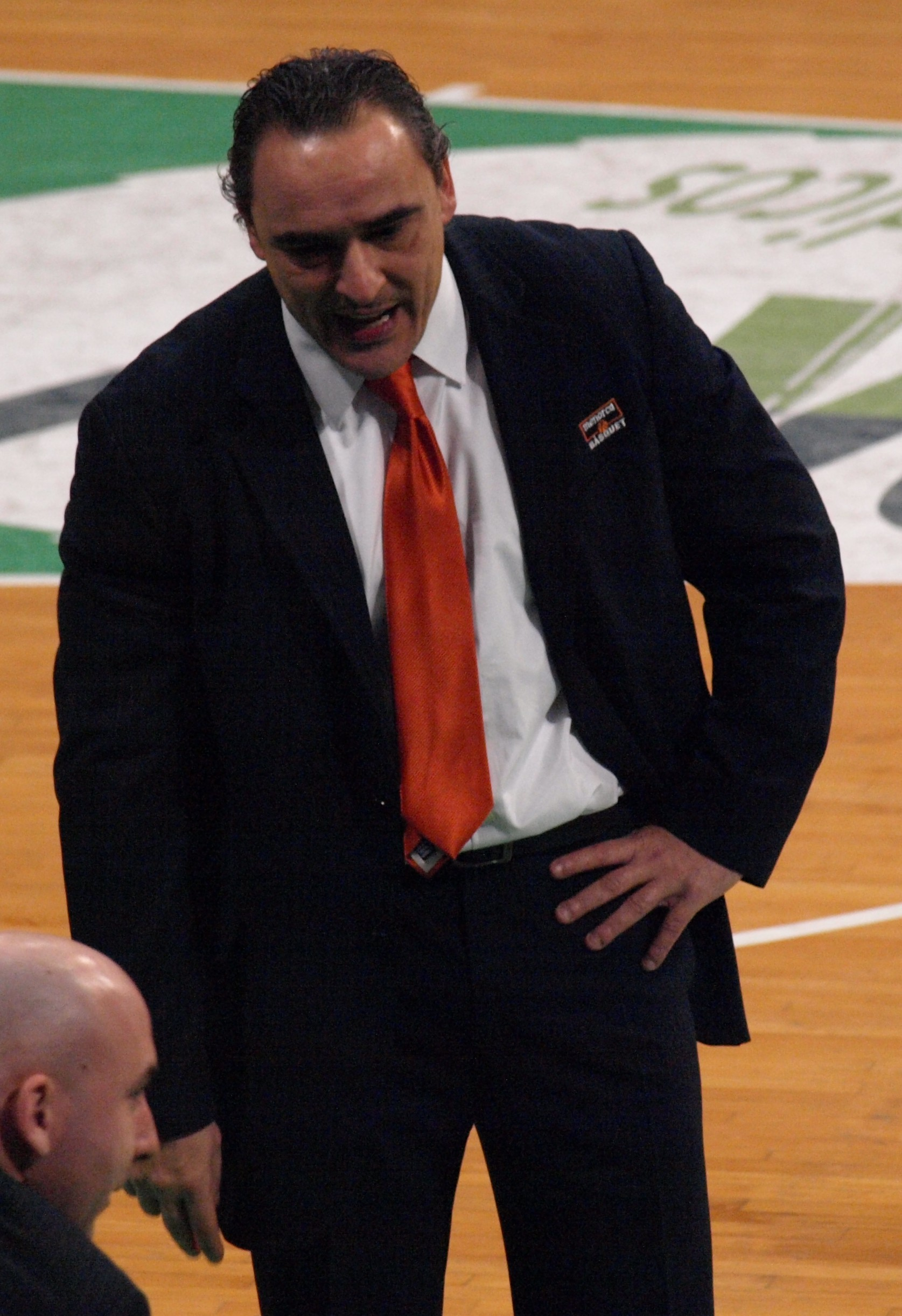

Saudi Arabia
- Position: Coach

Personal information
- Born: September 12, 1962 (age 64) Manresa, Catalonia, Spain

Career history

Coaching
- 1988–1990: Bàsquet Manresa (assistant)
- 1993–1996: Allianz Ras Manresa (assistant)
- 1996: C.B. Manresa
- 1998–2000: C.B. Montcada
- 2001: CB Tarragona
- 2001–2005: Bàsquet Manresa
- 2005–2006: Pamesa Valencia
- 2006–2009: ViveMenorca
- 2010–2011: Girona FC
- 2011–2012: Lleida Bàsquet
- 2013–2014: CB Valladolid
- 2015–2017: 1º de Agosto
- 2018–2020: FC Barcelona (assistant)
- 2021–2022: Gezira SC
- 2023–2024: Bahrain
- 2024–present: Saudi Arabia

Career highlights
- As head coach: Angolan League champion (2016); LEB Coach of the Year (2002); As Assistant Coach: 2× Spanish Cup champion (2018–2019); Catalan League champion (2019)
Medals
Men's basketball
Head Coach for Spain
Mediterranean Games
| Gold medal – first place | 1997 Mediterranean |
Mediterranean Games
| Silver medal – second place | 1999 Mediterranean |

Ricard Casas i Gurt (born 12 September 1962 in Manresa, Catalonia, Spain) is a Spanish basketball coach. He currently is the coach of the Saudi Arabian national basketball team.

== Professional career ==
Casas has coached several Liga ACB clubs, such as Bàsquet Manresa, Menorca Bàsquet, Valencia Basket or FC Barcelona (as an assistant coach). He coached 1º de Agosto of the Angolan Basketball League and won the 2015-16 Angolan Championship. In recent years, he has coached the Bahrain national basketball team and the Saudi Arabian national basketball team.
