= Alberto Miguel =

Spanish basketball player

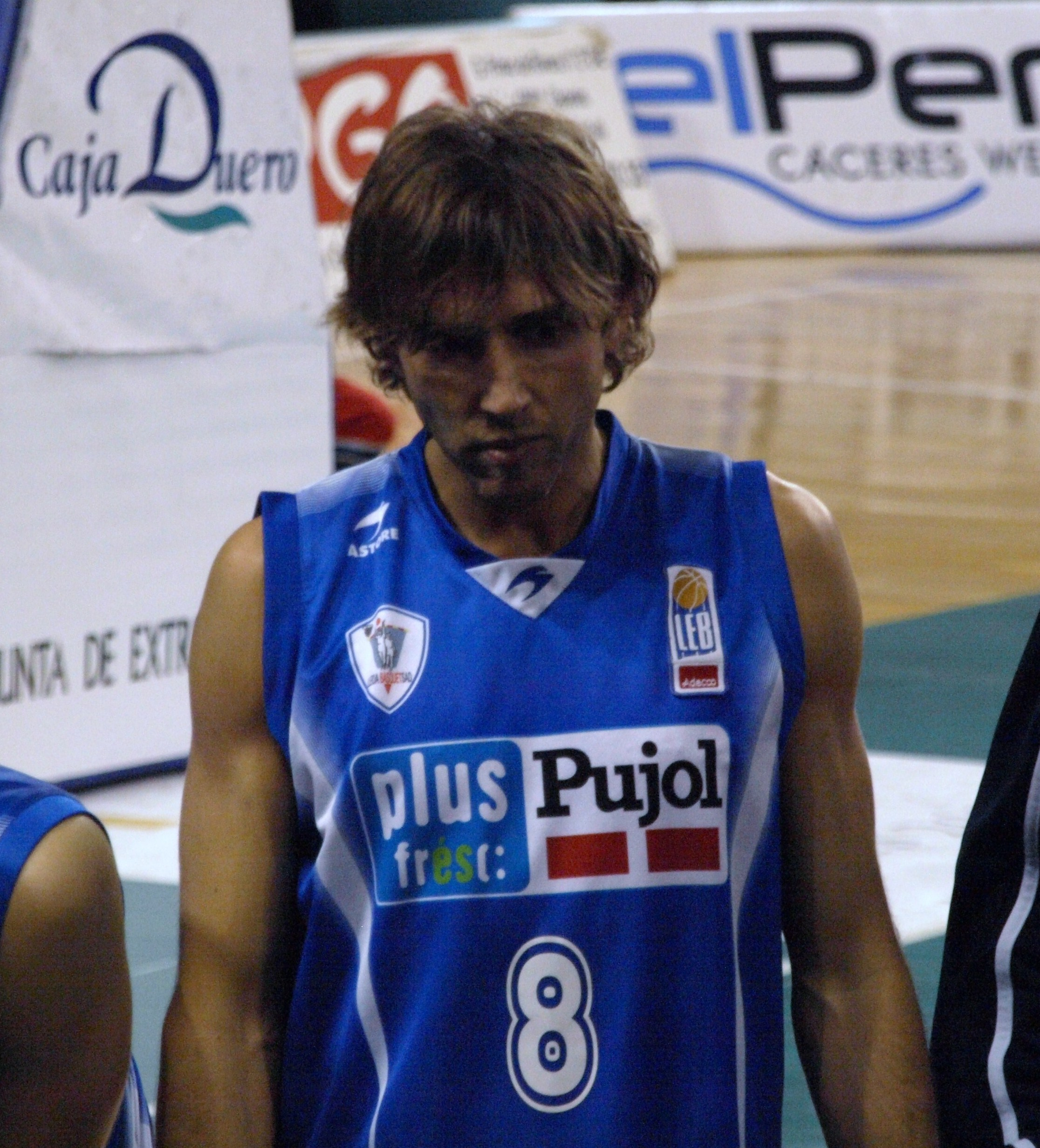

Ford Burgos
- Position: Shooting guard

Personal information
- Born: May 29, 1977 (age 49) Laredo, Spain
- Listed height: 6 ft 2 in (1.88 m)
- Listed weight: 194 lb (88 kg)

Career information
- Playing career: 1996–present

Alberto Miguel Martín (born May 29, 1977) is a Spanish professional basketball player.

== Playing career ==
- 1995/96 (Spain) CB Laredo (youth team)
- 1996/99 (Spain) CB Calasanz Santander
- 1999/03 (Spain) Cantabria Lobos
- 2003/06 (Spain) Llanera Menorca
- 2006/09 (Spain) Plus Pujol Lleida
- 2009/11 (Spain) Ford Burgos
- 2011/12 (Spain) CD Estela
- 2012/12 (Spain) Aguas de Sousas Ourense
- 2012/ (Spain) Ford Burgos

== Honours ==
Plus Pujol Lleida

- LEB Catalan League Champion: 2
  - 2007, 2008
