= LEB Catalan basketball league =

The LEB Catalan basketball league is the 2nd-tier level regional professional preseason basketball competition that is organized by the Catalan Basketball Federation since 2000, in Catalonia, Spain. Catalan LEB (Spanish 2nd Division) teams play in this competition.

In some years, the winning team of this competition has also played in the top-tier level Lliga Catalana with the Liga ACB (Spanish 1st Division) teams from Catalonia.

== Performance by club ==
Club	Winners	Runners-up	Winning years
CB Prat	4	5	2015, 2016, 2017, 2018
CB Tarragona	4	3	2002, 2004, 2005, 2014
Força Lleida CE	3	3	2012, 2022, 2023
CE Lleida Bàsquet	3	2	2007, 2008, 2011
Bàsquet Manresa	3	0	2000, 2001, 2006
CB Sant Josep Girona	2	1	2009, 2010
Bàsquet Girona	2	0	2020, 2021
BC Andorra	1	1	2013
CB Aracena	1	0	2003
CB Pardinyes	1	0	2019
CB Salou	1	0	2024
FC Barcelona B	0	3	
CB Valls	0	2	
CB Cornellà	0	2	
CB L'Hospitalet	0	1	
CB Vic	0	1	
UE Mataró	0	1	

== Lliga Catalana LEB Gold History ==
Year	Host	Champion	Runner-up	Result	Final MVP	Champion's Coach
2024	Tarragona	OCA Global Salou	Homs Mataró	64–61	Adrià Aragonès	Jesús Muñiz
2023	Lleida	ICG Força Lleida	CB Prat	83–70	Kur Kuath	Gerard Encuentra
2022	Andorra la Vella / Lleida	ICG Força Lleida	MoraBanc Andorra	86–84 / 101–97	Juani Marcos	Gerard Encuentra
2021	Girona	Bàsquet Girona	CB Prat	76–56	Albert Sàbat	Carles Marco
2020	Balaguer	Bàsquet Girona	ICG Força Lleida	87–79	Albert Sàbat	Carles Marco
2019	Lleida	Ilerdauto Nissan Pardinyes Lleida	CB Prat	76–68	Wendell Davis	Gerard Encuentra
2018	El Prat de Llobregat	CB Prat	FC Barcelona Lassa B	92–80	Marc Rubín de Celis	Dani Miret
2017	Reus	CB Prat	FC Barcelona Lassa B	78–70	Aleix Font	Arturo Álvarez
2016	El Prat de Llobregat	CB Prat	Actel Força Lleida	87–70	Pep Ortega	Roberto Sánchez
2015	Granollers	CB Prat Joventut	Actel Força Lleida	80–68	Zoran Nikolić	Roberto Sánchez
2014	El Prat de Llobregat	CB Tarragona	CB Prat Joventut	63–62	Antonio Hester	Berni Álvarez
2013	Lleida	River Andorra	CB Prat Joventut	79–58	Asier Zengotitabengoa	Joan Peñarroya
2012	Lleida	Força Lleida	FC Barcelona Regal B	72–65	Dominic Calegari	Joaquín Prado
2011	Lleida	Lleida Bàsquet	Girona FC	70–65	Jason Detrick	Joaquín Prado
2010	Girona	Girona FC	Tarragona 2017	80–54	David Navarro	Ricard Casas
2009	Girona	Sant Josep Girona	CB Cornellà	73–61	Darryl Middleton	Borja Comenge
2008	Lleida	Plus Pujol Lleida	CB Vic	80–66	Gimel Lewis	Edu Torres
2007	Lleida	Plus Pujol Lleida	CB L'Hospitalet	76–74	Jaume Comas	Edu Torres
2006	Manresa	Ricoh Manresa	CB Tarragona 2016	88–75	Josh Asselin	Óscar Quintana
2005	Lleida	CB Tarragona	Plus Pujol Lleida	82–73		
2004	Tarragona	CB Tarragona	CB Valls Félix Hotel	75–62		
2003	Ponts	Aracena Ponts	CB Tarragona	92–88		Xavi Pascual
2002	Tarragona	CB Tarragona	Almeda Park Cornellà	93–50		Porfirio Fisac
2001	Manresa	Minorisa.net Manresa	CB Valls Félix Hotel	81–75		Ricard Casas
2000	Manresa	Bàsquet Manresa	Caprabo Lleida	87–82		Salva Maldonado

=== 2024 Lliga Catalana LEB ===
==== Group 1 ====
Pos	Team	Pld	W	L	PF	PA	PD	Pts	Qualification
1	OCA Global Salou	2	1	1	169	162	+7	3	Qualification to the final
2	Ibersol Tarragona	2	1	1	157	154	+3	3	
3	Santfeliuenc	2	1	1	164	174	−10	3	

Source: FCBQ

==== Group 2 ====
Pos	Team	Pld	W	L	PF	PA	PD	Pts	Qualification
1	Homs Mataró	2	2	0	165	160	+5	4	Qualification to the final
2	Sol Gironès Bisbal	2	1	1	150	146	+4	3	
3	Prat	2	0	2	145	154	−9	2	

Source: FCBQ

==== Final ====
Final
Tarragona, 28 September 2024
OCA Global Salou	64
Homs Mataró	61

Source: FCBQ

=== 2023 Lliga Catalana LEB ===
==== Finals ====
Quarter-finals
16–24 September 2023
Homs Mataró	73	66	139
Pajarraco CBS	65	69	134
17–23 September 2023
OCA Global Salou	74	80	154
Prat	90	86	176
16–23 September 2023
Ibersol CBT	53	61	114
Sandá Electroclima	56	74	130

Semi-finals
Lleida, 29 September 2023
ICG Força Lleida	89
Homs Mataró	71
Lleida, 29 September 2023
Prat	104
Sandá Electroclima L'Hospitalet	79

Final
Lleida, 30 September 2023
ICG Força Lleida	83
Prat	70

Source: FCBQ

=== 2022 Lliga Catalana LEB ===
==== Finals ====
Final
26–29 September 2022
MoraBanc Andorra	84	97	181
ICG Força Lleida	86	101	187

=== 2021 Lliga Catalana LEB ===
==== Qualification ====
Pos	Team	Pld	W	L	PF	PA	PD	Pts	Qualification
1	Prat	2	2	0	160	141	+19	4	Qualification to the final
2	Bàsquet Girona	2	1	1	141	140	+1	3	Qualification to the final
3	ICG Força Lleida	2	0	2	148	168	−20	2	

Source: FCBQ

==== Final ====
Final
Girona, 2 October 2021
Bàsquet Girona	76
Prat	56

Source: FCBQ

=== 2020 Lliga Catalana LEB ===
==== Final ====
Final
Balaguer, 10 October 2020
ICG Força Lleida	79
Bàsquet Girona	87

Source: FCBQ

=== 2019 Lliga Catalana LEB ===
==== Group 1 ====
Pos	Team	Pld	W	L	PF	PA	PD	Pts	Qualification
1	Bàsquet Girona	2	2	0	166	146	+20	4	Qualification to the final four
2	Torrons Vicens L'Hospitalet	2	1	1	153	158	−5	3	Qualification to the final four
3	ICG Força Lleida	2	0	2	152	167	−15	2	

Source: FCBQ

==== Group 2 ====
Pos	Team	Pld	W	L	PF	PA	PD	Pts	Qualification
1	Prat	2	2	0	155	134	+21	4	Qualification to the final four
2	Ilerdauto Nissan Pardinyes Lleida	2	1	1	131	139	−8	3	Qualification to the final four
3	Barcelona B	2	0	2	113	126	−13	2	

Source: FCBQ

==== Final Four ====
Semi-finals
Lleida, 14 September 2019
Prat	97
Torrons Vicens L'Hospitalet	82
Lleida, 14 September 2019
Bàsquet Girona	72
Ilerdauto Pardinyes	83

Final
Lleida, 15 September 2019
Prat	68
Ilerdauto Pardinyes	76

=== 2018 Lliga Catalana LEB ===
==== Finals ====
Semi-finals
20–22 September 2018
Torrons Vicens L'Hospitalet	62	51	113
Prat	89	69	158
9–23 September 2018
Actel Força Lleida	63	56	119
Barcelona Lassa B	66	59	125

Final
El Prat de Llobregat, 30 September 2018
Prat	92
Barcelona Lassa B	80

Source: FCBQ

=== 2017 Lliga Catalana LEB ===
==== Group 1 ====
Pos	Team	Pld	W	L	PF	PA	PD	Pts	Qualification
1	Barcelona Lassa B	2	1	1	160	141	+19	3	Qualification to the final
2	ICL Manresa	2	1	1	138	145	−7	3	
3	Torrons Vicens L'Hospitalet	2	1	1	132	144	−12	3	

Source: FCBQ

==== Group 2 ====
Pos	Team	Pld	W	L	PF	PA	PD	Pts	Qualification
1	Prat	2	2	0	186	177	+9	4	Qualification to the final
2	Actel Força Lleida	2	1	1	189	178	+11	3	
3	Martorell	2	0	2	159	179	−20	2	

Source: FCBQ

==== Final ====
Final
Reus, 24 September 2017
Barcelona Lassa B	70
Prat	78

Source: FCBQ

=== 2016 Lliga Catalana LEB ===
==== Finals ====
Quarter-finals
16–18 September 2016
T. Vicens L'Hospitalet	76	65	141
Tarragona 2017	60	71	131

Semi-finals
El Prat de Llobregat, 24 September 2016
Barcelona Lassa B	51
Actel Força Lleida	68
El Prat de Llobregat, 24 September 2016
Prat	79
Torrons Vicens L'Hospitalet	71

Final
El Prat de Llobregat, 25 September 2016
Actel Força Lleida	70
Prat	87

Source: FCBQ

=== 2015 Lliga Catalana LEB ===
==== Finals ====
Semi-finals
10–13 September 2015
Tarragona	68	63	131
Actel Força Lleida	79	80	159
18–21 September 2015
Barcelona Lassa B	74	66	140
Prat Joventut	82	75	157

Final
Granollers, 26 September 2015
Actel Força Lleida	68
Prat Joventut	80

=== 2014 Lliga Catalana LEB ===
==== Final Four ====
Semi-finals
El Prat, 26 September 2014
Prat Joventut	73
Barcelona B	69
El Prat, 26 September 2014
Força Lleida	69
Tarragona	75

Final
El Prat, 28 September 2014
Prat Joventut	62
Tarragona	63

Source: FCBQ

=== 2013 Lliga Catalana LEB ===
==== Finals ====
Semi-finals
20–22 September 2013
Força Lleida	93	60	153
Prat Joventut	82	87	169
17–24 September 2013
Barcelona B	66	64	130
River Andorra	78	72	150

Final
Lleida, 26 September 2013
Prat Joventut	58
River Andorra	79

Source: FCBQ

=== 2012 Lliga Catalana LEB ===
==== Final Four ====
Semi-finals
Lleida, 15 September 2012
Força Lleida	79
Prat Joventut	58
Lleida, 15 September 2012
River Andorra	64
Barcelona Regal B	65

Final
Lleida, 16 September 2012
Força Lleida	72
Barcelona Regal B	65
Third place
Lleida, 16 September 2012
Prat Joventut	54
River Andorra	71

Source: FCBQ

=== 2011 Lliga Catalana LEB ===
==== Qualification ====
Pos	Team	Pld	W	L	PF	PA	PD	Pts	Qualification
1	Lleida	2	2	0	123	113	+10	4	Qualification to the final
2	Girona	2	1	1	152	144	+8	3	Qualification to the final
3	Tarragona 2017	2	0	2	146	164	−18	2	

Source: FCBQ

==== Final ====
Final
Lleida, 18 September 2011
Lleida	70
Girona	65

Source: FCBQ

=== 2010 Lliga Catalana LEB ===
==== Qualification ====
Pos	Team	Pld	W	L	PF	PA	PD	Pts	Qualification
1	Girona	2	2	0	173	130	+43	4	Qualification to the final
2	Tarragona 2017	2	1	1	149	161	−12	3	Qualification to the final
3	Lleida	2	0	2	151	182	−31	2	

Source: FCBQ

==== Final ====
Final
Girona, 12 September 2010
Girona	80
Tarragona 2017	54

Source: FCBQ

=== 2009 Lliga Catalana LEB ===
==== Group 1 ====
Pos	Team	Pld	W	L	PF	PA	PD	Pts	Qualification
1	Sant Josep Girona	3	3	0	260	223	+37	6	Qualification to the final
2	Tarragona 2017	3	1	2	220	219	+1	4	
3	River Andorra	3	1	2	237	245	−8	4	
4	L'Hospitalet	3	1	2	225	255	−30	4	

Source: FCBQ

==== Group 2 ====
Pos	Team	Pld	W	L	PF	PA	PD	Pts	Qualification
1	Cornellà	2	2	0	163	129	+34	4	Qualification to the final
2	Prat Joventut	2	1	1	130	144	−14	3	
3	ADT Tarragona	2	0	2	138	158	−20	2	

Source: FCBQ

==== Final ====
Final
Girona, 20 September 2009
Sant Josep Girona	73
Cornellà	61

Source: FCBQ

=== 2008 Lliga Catalana LEB ===
==== Group 1 ====
Pos	Team	Pld	W	L	PF	PA	PD	Pts	Qualification
1	Plus Pujol Lleida	3	3	0	240	208	+32	6	Qualification to the final
2	Torrons Vicens L'Hospitalet	3	2	1	229	237	−8	5	
3	WTC Almeda Park Cornellà	3	1	2	227	217	+10	4	
4	Sant Josep Girona	3	0	3	191	225	−34	3	

Source: FCBQ

==== Group 2 ====
Pos	Team	Pld	W	L	PF	PA	PD	Pts	Qualification
1	Vic	3	3	0	243	173	+70	6	Qualification to the final
2	Tarragona	3	2	1	209	218	−9	5	
3	Prat Joventut	3	1	2	210	216	−6	4	
4	ADT Tarragona	3	0	3	163	218	−55	3	

Source: FCBQ

==== Final ====
Final
Lleida, 14 September 2008
Plus Pujol Lleida	80
Vic	66

Source: FCBQ

=== 2007 Lliga Catalana LEB ===
==== Final Four ====
Semi-finals
Lleida, 15 September 2007
Plus Pujol Lleida	76
Akasvayu Vic	65
Lleida, 15 September 2007
Tarragona 2016	67
L'Hospitalet	80

Final
Lleida, 16 September 2007
Plus Pujol Lleida	76
L'Hospitalet	74

== Lliga Catalana LEB Silver History ==
Year	Host	Champion	Runner-up	Result
2020	Terrassa	Barça B	CB Prat	78–57
2018	Santa Coloma de Farners	Torrons Vicens L'Hospitalet	Bàsquet Girona	73–56
2011	League of 3 teams	CB Prat Joventut	River Andorra	
2010	Andorra la Vella	River Andorra	ADT Tarragona	83–72
