= Berni Álvarez =

Spanish basketball player

The Honourable Berni Álvarez
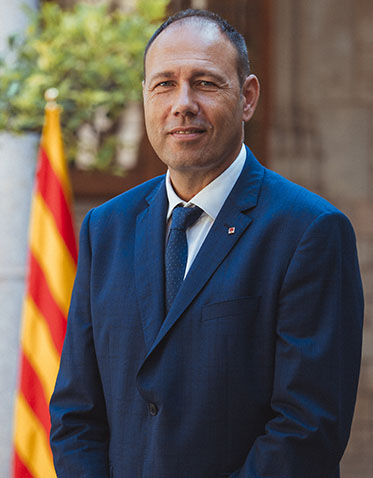
- Official portrait, 2024

Minister of Sports of Catalonia
- Incumbent
- Assumed office 12 August 2024
- President: Salvador Illa
- Preceded by: Laura Vilagrà (Note: Part of the Catalan Ministry of the Presidency as General Secretariat of Sport (Catalan: Secretaria General de l'Esport).)

Member of the Tarragona City Council
- In office 17 June 2023 – 12 August 2024

Personal details
- Born: August 3, 1971 (age 55) Reus, Spain
- Party: Socialists' Party of Catalonia
- Basketball career

Tarragona
- Title: Head coach
- League: Liga EBA

Personal information
- Listed height: 6 ft 5 in (1.96 m)
- Listed weight: 212 lb (96 kg)

Career information
- Playing career: 1992–2010
- Position: Small forward
- Coaching career: 2010–present

Career history

Playing
- 1992–1995: CB Tarragona
- 1995–2001: Pamesa Valencia
- 2001–2004: Lleida Bàsquet
- 2004–2007: CB Tarragona
- 2007–2008: Lleida Bàsquet
- 2008–2010: CB Tarragona

Coaching
- 2010–present: CB Tarragona

Bernardo Álvarez Merino (born August 3, 1971 in Reus) is a Spanish former basketball player who has served as Minister of Sports of Catalonia since 2024.

As a player, after playing with CB Tarragona, he played several years at Liga ACB and European competitions with Pamesa Valencia and Plus Pujol Lleida.

Since the 2010-11 season, he became a coach and he starts his career at CB Tarragona in LEB Oro, club which retired his old number 5.

== Honours ==
=== As player ===
Pamesa Valencia

- Spanish Cup Champion: 1
  - 1998

Plus Pujol Lleida

- LEB Catalan League: 1
  - 2007

Spain

- Universiade Bronze Medal: 1
  - 1999

=== As coach ===
CB Tarragona

- LEB Catalan League: 1
  - 2014
