= Edu Torres =

Spanish professional basketball coach

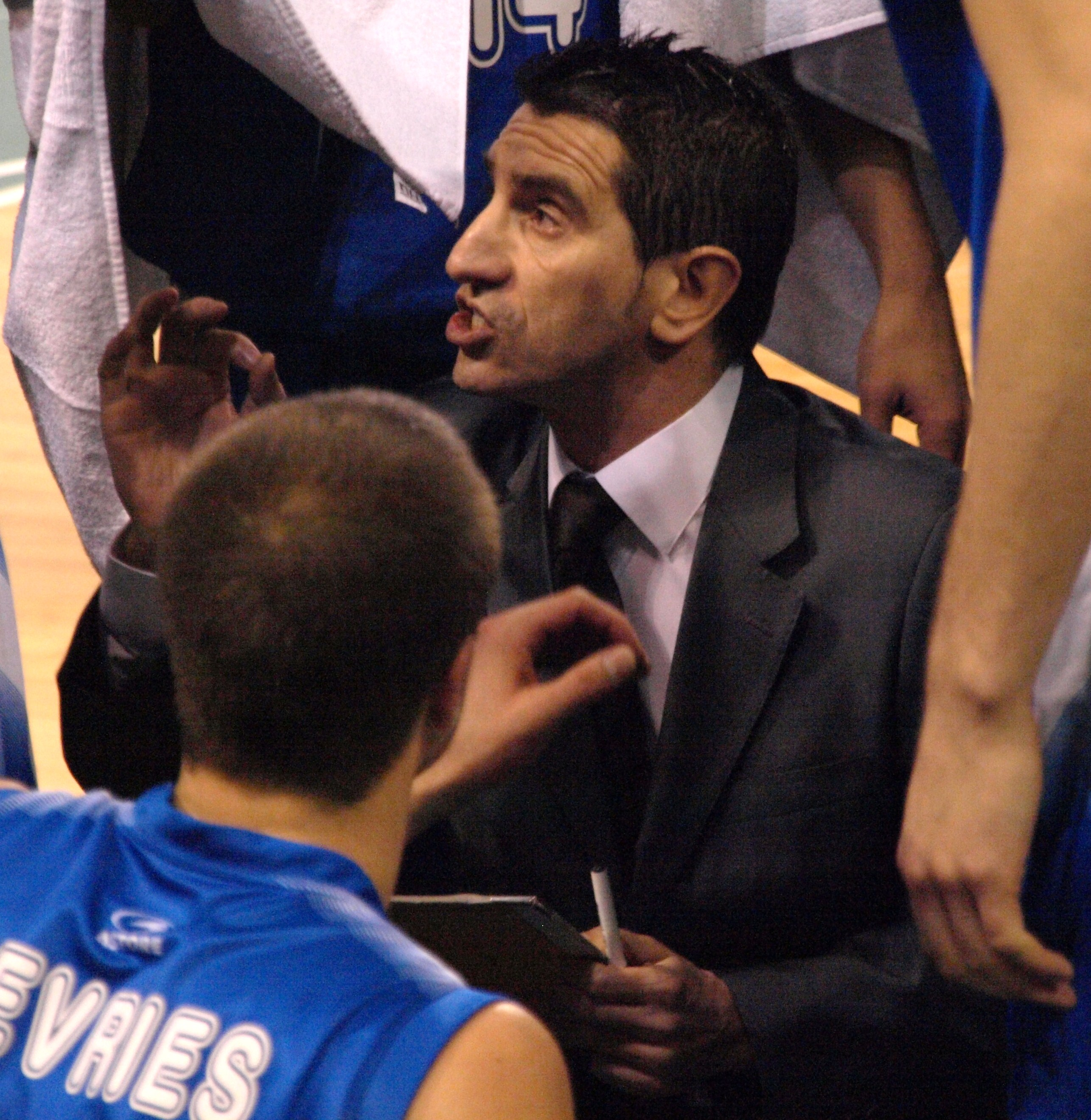

Thailand national team
- Position: Head coach
- League: FIBA Asia

Personal information
- Born: May 26, 1964 (age 62) Barcelona, Spain
- Listed height: 5 ft 11 in (1.80 m)
- Listed weight: 154 lb (70 kg)
- Coaching career: 1985–present

Career highlights
- As head coach: AEEB Spanish Coach of the Year (2002); ABL Coach of the Year (2016–17)

Eduard Torres Girbau (born May 26, 1964) is a Spanish professional basketball coach. He is currently the head coach of the Thai national team.

== Coach career ==
- 1985–86 (Spain) Joventut Badalona (youth team)
- 1987–96 Festina Andorra
- 1997–99 (Spain) Climalia León
- 1999–03 (Spain) Caprabo Lleida
- 2003–06 (Spain) Akasvayu Girona
- 2006–09 (Spain) Plus Pujol Lleida
- 2009–10 (Spain) CB Murcia
- 2011–12 (Spain) Força Lleida CE
- 2013–14 (Mexico) Huracanes de Tampico
- 2014–15 (China) Hunan Snow Wolves
- 2016 (Venezuela) Toros de Aragua
- 2016–19 (Hong Kong) Eastern Long Lions
- 2020 (Venezuela) Guaiqueríes de Margarita
- 2021–22 (Mexico) Halcones de Xalapa
- 2022–present (Thailand) Thai national team

== Honours ==
Plus Pujol Lleida

- LEB Champions: 1
  - 2001
- ACB Catalan League Champions: 2
  - 2002, 2003
- LEB Catalan League Champion: 2
  - 2007, 2008
- AEEB Coach of the Year: 1
  - 2002
- ASEAN Basketball League: 1
  - 2016–17
- ABL Coach of the Year: 1
  - 2016–17

== Coaching record ==
Team	Year	G	W	L	W–L%	Finish	PG	PW	PL	Result
Festina Andorra	1992–93	31	15	16	.484	12th	2	0	2	Lost ACB First Round
Festina Andorra	1993–94	28	18	10	.643	9th	4	2	2	Lost ACB First Round
Festina Andorra	1994–95	38	20	18	.526	8th	2	0	2	Lost ACB First Round
Festina Andorra	1995–96	38	10	28	.263	19th	4	1	3	Relegated
León Caja España	1997–98	34	14	20	.412	11th	0	0	0	Lost ACB First Round
León Caja España	1998–99	34	13	21	.382	6th	0	0	0	-
Caprabo Lleida	1999–00	30	19	11	.633	4th	10	5	5	Lost LEB Semifinals
Caprabo Lleida	2000–01	30	22	8	.733	1st	9	7	2	Won LEB Championship
Caprabo Lleida	2001–02	34	19	15	.559	8th	4	1	3	Lost ACB First Round
Caprabo Lleida	2002–03	34	16	18	.471	11th	0	0	0	-
Caprabo Lleida	2003–04	15	5	10	.333	-	0	0	0	-
Casademont Girona	2003–04	15	9	6	.600	13th	0	0	0	-
Casademont Girona	2004–05	34	11	23	.324	16th	0	0	0	-
Casademont Girona	2005–06	34	18	16	.530	7th	4	1	3	Lost ACB First Round
Plus Pujol Lleida	2006–07	32	17	15	.531	10th	0	0	0	-
Plus Pujol Lleida	2007–08	34	19	15	.559	6th	3	1	2	Lost LEB Oro First Round
Plus Pujol Lleida	2008–09	34	18	16	.529	10th	0	0	0	-
Murcia	2009–10	23	3	20	.130	18th	0	0	0	Relegated
Career		572	266	286	.465		42	18	24	
