= CE Lleida Bàsquet =

Lleida Bàsquet
- Leagues: LEB Plata
- Founded: 1997
- Dissolved: 2012
- History: Oli Baró de Maials; 1997–1999; Caprabo Lleida; 1999–2004; Plus Pujol Lleida; 2004–2009; Avantmèdic Lleida; 2009–2010; Lleida Bàsquet; 2010–2011; Lleida Basquetbol; 2011–
- Arena: Barris Nord
- Location: Lleida, Spain
- Team colors: Blue and white
- President: Edu Torres
- Head coach: Vacant
- Championships: 1 LEB League; 2 Catalan Leagues
- Retired numbers: 10 Berni Tamames; 12 Manel Bosch
- Website: lleidabasquetbol.com
Home	Away

Club Esportiu Ciutat i Provincia de Lleida Basquetbol was a professional basketball team based in Lleida, Catalonia, Spain and played in the Barris Nord, in LEB Oro league. The club was founded in the summer of 1997 like a need of unify basketball with Lleida, with the origin of Maristes team, that played in the Second National Division. The team spend two seasons in the EBA League linked by Bàsquet Manresa and under the name of Baró de Maials. Caprabo Lleida (the new name of the team) jumped to the LEB League in 1999 and to the ACB League in 2001. Under the name of Plus Pujol Lleida, the club returned to LEB League in 2005. In 2009, is relegated to EBA League due economic problems and changed the name to Avantmèdic Lleida, but in the next year, they return to LEB Oro League via CB Cornellà.

On July 6, 2012, Lleida Basquetbol announced via Twitter the club would not join any competition for the 2012–13 season, and it would be replaced by the new creation club Força Lleida CE.

== History ==
=== ULEB era ===
In the 2002/03 season, Caprabo Lleida started playing the ULEB Cup. The team ranked second in the group round with a record of 6–4, the same as Varese (Italy), first. In the first round, Caprabo won Ural Great (Russia) but in the second lost with Krka Novo Mesto (Slovenia). In the 2003/04 season, the team played again ULEB Cup by invitation. Caprabo ranked first in the group round with a record of 8–2. In the first round, the theam won Makedonikos (Greece) but they lost again in the second round, this time against Estudiantes (Spain).

== Sponsorship naming ==
- Oli Baró de Maials (1997–1999)
- Caprabo Lleida (1999–2004)
- Plus Pujol Lleida (2004–2009)
- Avantmèdic Lleida (2009–2010)
- Lleida Bàsquet (2010–2011)
- Lleida Basquetbol (2011–)

== Trophies and awards ==
=== Trophies ===
- LEB:
  - 2000–01: 1
- Lliga Catalana ACB:
  - 2002–03, 2003–04: 2
- Lliga Catalana LEB:
  - 2007–08, 2008–09: 2

=== Individual awards ===
LEB Oro MVP

- Joe Bunn – 2000

LEB Oro Best Rebounder

- Dwayne Curtis – 2011

== Season by season ==
Season	Tier	Division	Pos.	Postseason	Cup Competitions	European competitions	RS	PO	Cup	EU	EP	Tot
1997–98	3	Liga EBA	2	Round of 16	–	–	18–8	2–3	–	–	–	20–11
1998–99	3	Liga EBA	12	–	–	–	12–18	–	–	–	–	12–18
1999–00	2	LEB	3	Semifinalist	Copa Príncipe quarterfinalist	–	19–11	5–5	0–1	–	–	24–17
2000–01	2	LEB	1	Promoted	Copa Príncipe semifinalist	–	22–8	7–2	0–1	–	–	29–11
2001–02	1	Liga ACB	8	Quarterfinalist	–	–	19–15	1–3	–	–	–	20–18
2002–03	1	Liga ACB	11	–	–	2 ULEB Cup quarterfinalist	16–18	–	–	6–4	2–2	24–24
2003–04	1	Liga ACB	16	–	–	2 ULEB Cup quarterfinalist	13–21	–	–	8–2	2–2	23–25
2004–05	1	Liga ACB	17	Relegated	–	–	9–25	–	–	–	–	9–25
2005–06	2	LEB	14	–	–	–	14–20	–	–	–	–	14–20
2006–07	2	LEB	10	–	–	–	17–17	–	–	–	–	17–17
2007–08	2	LEB Oro	6	Quarterfinalist	–	–	19–15	1–2	–	–	–	20–17
2008–09	2	LEB Oro	10	–	–	–	18–16	–	–	–	–	18–16
2009–10	4	Liga EBA	8	–	–	–	11–13	–	–	–	–	11–13
2010–11	2	LEB Oro	12	–	–	–	13–21	–	–	–	–	13–21
2011–12	2	LEB Oro	7	Quarterfinalist	–	–	20–14	2–3	–	–	–	22–17
2012–	did not enter any competition											
Total	–	–	–	–	–	–	240–240	18–18	0–2	14–6	4–4	276–270

== Past rosters ==
=== 1999–2000 ===
Caprabo Lleida roster
Players
Coaches

Pos.	No.	Nat.	Name	Ht.	Wt.	Age
SG	4	(Spain)	Grimau, Roger	1.96 m (6 ft 5 in)
C	5	(Spain)	Ruf, Carlos	2.10 m (6 ft 11 in)
SF	7	(Spain)	Juan, Marc	2.05 m (6 ft 9 in)
PG	8	(Argentina)	Victoriano, Lucas	1.90 m (6 ft 3 in)
SG	9	(Spain)	Bordas, Ramon	1.87 m (6 ft 2 in)
PG	11	(Spain)	Oliver, Albert	1.87 m (6 ft 2 in)
SF	12	(United States)	Carter, Don	1.98 m (6 ft 6 in)
PF	13	(United States)	Bunn, Joseph	1.98 m (6 ft 6 in)
C	14	(Spain)	García, Mario	2.12 m (6 ft 11 in)
SF	15	(Spain)	Grimau, Sergi	2.00 m (6 ft 7 in)
PG		(Spain)	Comas, Jaume	1.86 m (6 ft 1 in)

Head coach

- (Spain) Edu Torres

Legend

- (C) Team captain
- Injured

=== 2000–01 ===
Caprabo Lleida roster
Players
Coaches

Pos.	No.	Nat.	Name	Ht.	Wt.	Age
SG	4	(Spain)	Grimau, Roger	1.96 m (6 ft 5 in)
SF	5	(United States)	Modderman, Joe	2.06 m (6 ft 9 in)
PG	6	(Spain)	Comas, Jaume	1.86 m (6 ft 1 in)
C	7	(Spain)	Alzamora, Alfons	2.06 m (6 ft 9 in)
SF	8	(Spain)	Bosch, Manel	1.98 m (6 ft 6 in)
SG	9	(Spain)	Bordas, Ramon	1.87 m (6 ft 2 in)
SF	10	(Spain)	Sala, Valentí	1.96 m (6 ft 5 in)
PG	11	(Spain)	Oliver, Albert	1.87 m (6 ft 2 in)
PF	13	(United States)	Cuthrell, Eric	2.04 m (6 ft 8 in)
C	14	(Spain)	García, Mario	2.12 m (6 ft 11 in)
SF	15	(Spain)	Capdevila, Pere	1.96 m (6 ft 5 in)
SF		(Spain)	Grimau, Sergi	2.00 m (6 ft 7 in)

Head coach

- (Spain) Edu Torres

Legend

- (C) Team captain
- Injured

=== 2001–02 ===
Caprabo Lleida roster
Players
Coaches

Pos.	No.	Nat.	Name	Ht.	Wt.	Age
SG	4	(Spain)	Grimau, Roger	1.96 m (6 ft 5 in)
SF	5	(Spain)	Álvarez, Berni	1.95 m (6 ft 5 in)
PG	6	(Spain)	Comas, Jaume	1.86 m (6 ft 1 in)
PG	7	(Spain)	Lasa, José	1.81 m (5 ft 11 in)
PG	8	(Argentina)	Victoriano, Lucas	1.90 m (6 ft 3 in)
C	9	(United States)	Bramlett, AJ	2.08 m (6 ft 10 in)
SF	11	(Portugal)	Ramos, Sérgio	2.00 m (6 ft 7 in)
SF	12	(Spain)	Bosch, Manel	1.98 m (6 ft 6 in)
C	13	(Spain)	Tamames, Berni	2.06 m (6 ft 9 in)
PF	14	(United States)	Ruffin, Michael	2.03 m (6 ft 8 in)
C	15	(Spain)	Romero, Nacho	2.14 m (7 ft 0 in)
PF		(United States)	Sallier, Bryan	2.02 m (6 ft 8 in)

Head coach

- (Spain) Edu Torres

Legend

- (C) Team captain
- Injured

=== 2002–03 ===
Caprabo Lleida roster
Players
Coaches

Pos.	No.	Nat.	Name	Ht.	Wt.	Age
SG	4	(Spain)	Grimau, Roger	1.96 m (6 ft 5 in)
SF	5	(Spain)	Álvarez, Berni	1.95 m (6 ft 5 in)
PG	6	(Spain)	Comas, Jaume	1.86 m (6 ft 1 in)
SF	7	(United States)	Rogers, Johnny	2.03 m (6 ft 8 in)
PG	8	(France)	Dumas, Stéphane	1.90 m (6 ft 3 in)
C	9	(United States)	Bramlett, AJ	2.08 m (6 ft 10 in)
C	10	(Spain)	Tamames, Berni	2.06 m (6 ft 9 in)
SF	11	(Portugal)	Ramos, Sérgio	2.00 m (6 ft 7 in)
SF	12	(Spain)	Bosch, Manel	1.98 m (6 ft 6 in)
PF	14	(United States)	Ruffin, Michael	2.03 m (6 ft 8 in)
SG	15	(Spain)	Angulo, Alberto	1.96 m (6 ft 5 in)
PG		(Spain)	Laso, Pablo	1.78 m (5 ft 10 in)

Head coach

- (Spain) Edu Torres

Legend

- (C) Team captain
- Injured

=== 2003–04 ===
Caprabo Lleida roster
Players
Coaches

Pos.	No.	Nat.	Name	Ht.	Wt.	Age
SF	4	(Portugal)	Ramos, Sérgio	2.00 m (6 ft 7 in)
SF	5	(Spain)	Álvarez, Berni	1.95 m (6 ft 5 in)
PG	6	(Spain)	Comas, Jaume	1.86 m (6 ft 1 in)
SF	7	(Spain)	Rogers, Johnny	2.03 m (6 ft 8 in)
C	8	(United States)	Alston, Derrick	2.08 m (6 ft 10 in)
C	9	(United States)	Bramlett, AJ	2.08 m (6 ft 10 in)
C	10	(Spain)	Tamames, Berni	2.06 m (6 ft 9 in)
PG	11	(Spain)	Rodilla, Nacho	1.92 m (6 ft 4 in)
SF	14	(Spain)	Esteller, Roger	1.91 m (6 ft 3 in)
SG	15	(Spain)	Angulo, Alberto	1.96 m (6 ft 5 in)

Head coach

- (Croatia) Asa Petrović

Legend

- (C) Team captain
- Injured

=== 2004–05 ===
Caprabo Lleida roster
Players
Coaches

Pos.	No.	Nat.	Name	Ht.	Wt.	Age
PF	5	(Argentina) (Italy)	Fernández, Gabriel	2.04 m (6 ft 8 in)
PG	6	(Spain)	Comas, Jaume	1.86 m (6 ft 1 in)
C	8	(United States)	Simpkins, Dickey	2.06 m (6 ft 9 in)
SG	9	(United States)	Brokenborough, Rasheed	1.91 m (6 ft 3 in)
C	10	(Spain)	Tamames, Berni	2.06 m (6 ft 9 in)
SG	15	(Spain)	Angulo, Alberto	1.96 m (6 ft 5 in)
C	21	(United States)	Alston, Derrick	2.08 m (6 ft 10 in)
PG	23	(Argentina) (Italy)	Gianella, Nicolás	1.87 m (6 ft 2 in)
C	25	(United States) (Cyprus)	Garcia, JoJo	2.06 m (6 ft 9 in)
SF	31	(Spain)	Esteller, Roger	1.91 m (6 ft 3 in)
SF	33	(Portugal)	Ramos, Sérgio	2.00 m (6 ft 7 in)
C	42	(United States)	Bramlett, AJ	2.08 m (6 ft 10 in)
C	44	(Luxembourg) (United States)	Jones, Alvin	2.11 m (6 ft 11 in)
SF	55	(Spain)	Yáñez, Nacho	2.03 m (6 ft 8 in)

Head coach

- (Spain) Paco García

Legend

- (C) Team captain
- Injured

- 2008-2009 CE Lleida Bàsquet season
- 2007-2008 CE Lleida Bàsquet season

== Retired numbers ==
- 10 Berni Tamames, C, 2001–07
- 12 Manel Bosch, F, 2001–03

== Records ==
=== Career Statistical Leaders ===
- Games - Jaume Comas (313)
- Field Goals Made - AJ Bramlett (834)
- Field Goals Attempted - AJ Bramlett (1,530)
- 3-Point Field Goals Made - Berni Álvarez (264)
- 3-Point Field Goals Attempted - Berni Álvarez (683)
- Free Throws Made - Jaume Comas (642)
- Free Throws Attempted - Jaume Comas (899)
- Rebounds - AJ Bramlett (1,112)
- Assists - Jaume Comas (770)
- Blocked Shots - AJ Bramlett and Michael Ruffin (138)
- Points - Jaume Comas (2,495)

=== Team Records ===
- Most Points in a Game
  - 115 - versus Abeconsa Ferrol (115-66) on November 3, 2000
- Fewest Points in a Game
  - 52 - versus Caja San Fernando (52-76) on December 1, 2001
- Largest Margin of Victory in a Game
  - 49 - versus Abeconsa Ferrol (115-66) on November 3, 2000
- Largest Margin of Defeat in a Game
  - 40 - versus TAU Cerámica (120-80) on May 12, 2005
- Most Points in a Game by Rival
  - 120 - versus TAU Cerámica (120-80) on May 12, 2005
- Fewest Points in a Game by Rival
  - 46 - versus León Caja España (67-46) on January 14, 2006
- Longest Winning Streak
  - 7 from March 9, 2002, to April 20, 2002 (defeating Adecco Estudiantes, Granada, Casademont Girona, Caja San Fernando, Leche Río Breogán, Cantabria Lobos and Cáceres).
- Longest Losing Streak
  - 7 from November 15, 2003, to January 3, 2004
  - 7 from January 30, 2005, to March 26, 2005
  - 7 from October 29, 2005, to December 4, 2005

== Head coaches ==
As of May 13, 2012. Only competitive matches are counted.

Name	Nat	From	To	Record			
Name	Nat	From	To	P	W	L	%
Pere Romero	(Spain)	September 1997	September 1999	61	32	29	52.46%
Eduard Torres	(Spain)	September 1999	December 2003	185	105	80	56.76%
Miquel Domingo	(Spain)	December 2003	December 2003	1	1	0	100%
Aleksandar Petrović	(Croatia)	December 2003	December 2004	40	17	23	42.5%
Paco García	(Spain)	December 2004	May 2005	21	5	16	23.81%
Andreu Casadevall	(Spain)	May 2005	September 2006	36	14	22	38.89%
Josep Maria Torres	(Spain)	September 2006	October 2006	3	1	2	33.33%
Eduard Torres	(Spain)	October 2006	June 2009	100	54	46	54%
Josep Maria Torres	(Spain)	June 2009	June 2010	24	11	13	45.83%
Josep Maria Raventós	(Spain)	June 2010	June 2011	34	13	21	38.24%
Ricard Casas	(Spain)	August 2011	May 2012	39	22	17	56.41%

== Former players with NBA experience ==
- (United States) Derrick Alston
- (United States) AJ Bramlett
- (Dominican Republic) Luis Felipe López
- (United States) Johnny Rogers
- (United States) Michael Ruffin
- (United States) Dickey Simpkins
- (United States) Kevin Thompson

== Top game players ==
- (Spain) Jaume Comas (313)
- (Spain) Berni Tamames (182)
- (Spain) Berni Álvarez (167)
- (United States) AJ Bramlett (160)
- (Spain) Roger Grimau (149)
