= Castile and León autonomous basketball team =

Basketball team of Castile and León, Spain

Castile and León
- National federation: Basketball Federation of Castile and León
- Coach: Moncho Monsalve
Home	Away

First international
- Castile and León 77–84 Portugal (Burgos, Spain; 25 June 2005)

Biggest win
- Castile and León 104–79 Aragon (Palencia, Spain; 20 June 2007)

Biggest defeat
- Portugal 87–65 Castile and León (Anadia, Portugal; 22 June 2007)

The Castile and León autonomous basketball team is the basketball team of Castile and León. The team is not affiliated to FIBA, so only plays friendly games.

== History ==
The first appearance of Castile and León was on 2005, in Burgos and they were defeated by Portugal. Next year, another friendly game was played this time at Palencia with Japan, and the team was defeated again.

In 2007, the Castile and León team was invited by the Portuguese Basketball Federation to play a tournament in Anadia. Castile and León won only one game against the 'B' team of Germany.

== Roster ==
This is the roster of the Castile and León team for the 2007 Tournament in Anadia.

Castile and León Basketball Team roster
Players
Coaches

Pos.	No.	Name	Age – Date of birth	Height	Club	Ctr.
SG	4	Kuko Cruza	32 – 4 January 1975	1.98 m (6 ft 6 in)	CB Hellín	(Spain)
PG	5	Dani López	–	1.85 m (6 ft 1 in)	Gijón Baloncesto	(Spain)
SF	6	Julio González	–	1.92 m (6 ft 4 in)	Tenerife CB	(Spain)
PF	7	Martín Ferrer	–	2.03 m (6 ft 8 in)	CB San Andrés	(Castile and León)
SF	9	Fernando San Emeterio	23 – 1 January 1984	1.98 m (6 ft 6 in)	CB Girona	(Spain)
SG	10	Pepe Llorente	–	1.85 m (6 ft 1 in)	Palencia Baloncesto	(Castile and León)
PF	11	Nacho Martín	24 – 22 April 1983	2.03 m (6 ft 8 in)	CB Granada	(Spain)
C	12	Tomás Ramón	23 – 2 March 1984	2.02 m (6 ft 8 in)	Óbila CB	(Castile and León)
PF	13	Sergio de la Fuente	17 – 1 October 1989	1.98 m (6 ft 6 in)	CB Valladolid	(Castile and León)
PG	14	Pedro Rivero	27 – 22 July 1979	1.87 m (6 ft 2 in)	CB Los Barrios	(Spain)
C	15	José Manuel Coego	28 – 18 December 1978	2.05 m (6 ft 9 in)	Tenerife CB	(Spain)
C	16	Teo Aguirre	22 – 20 December 1984	2.04 m (6 ft 8 in)	CB Montilla	(Spain)
SG	20	Albano Martínez	27 – 4 November 1979	1.92 m (6 ft 4 in)	CB Clavijo	(Spain)
SF	33	Óscar Yebra	32 – 15 July 1974	2.00 m (6 ft 7 in)	CB Valladolid	(Castile and León)

Head coach

- (Castile and León) Moncho Monsalve

Assistant coaches

- (Castile and León) Porfirio Fisac

Legend

- (C) Team captain
- Club field describes pro club
  during the 2006–07 season

== Games played ==
25 June 2005	Castile and León	77–84	Portugal	Burgos
21:00
				Arena: Polideportivo El Plantío

20 June 2006	Castile and León	76–79	Japan	Palencia
	Scoring by quarter: 20–22, 14–17, 21–18, 21–22
	Pts: San Emeterio 18	Report	Pts: K. Takeuchi 18	Arena: Pabellón Marta Domínguez; Referees: Palenzuela Pastrana, González Cuervo

20 June 2007	Castile and León	104–79	Aragon	Palencia
				Arena: Pabellón Marta Domínguez

22 June 2007	Portugal	87–65	Castile and León	Anadia (Portugal)

23 June 2007	Castile and León	90–83	Germany 'B'	Anadia (Portugal)

24 June 2007	Portugal U20	76–90	Castile and León	Anadia (Portugal)
