= Moncho Monsalve =

Spanish basketball player and coach (1945–2026)

José Manuel Monsalve (1 January 1945 – 28 April 2026), commonly known as Moncho Monsalve, was a Spanish professional basketball player and coach.

== Biography ==
José Manuel Monsalve was born in Medina del Campo, Castile and León, Spain on 1 January 1945. As a player, he played at Atlético San Sebastián, Real Madrid (1963–1967), SD Kas and CB Girona. He retired in 1971 due to several injuries.

Monsalve succeeded Lula Ferreira in 2008, and coached Brazil at the FIBA Americas Championship 2009, where the team won a gold medal. Prior to this, he served stints with several teams of the Spanish Liga ACB and French Ligue Nationale de Basketball, and also the Castile and León autonomous basketball team.

He coached the junior squad of CB Murcia.

Monsalve died on 28 April 2026, at the age of 81.
