= List of Liga ACB annual three-point field goal percentage leaders =

In basketball, a three-point field goal (also known as a "three-pointer" or "3-pointer") is a field goal made from beyond the three-point line, a designated arc radiating from the basket. A successful attempt is worth three points, in contrast to the two points awarded for shots made inside the three-point line. The Liga ACB's (Endesa) three point field goal percentage leader is the player with the highest three point percentage in a given season.

To qualify as a leader for the three point field goal percentage, a player must play in at least 80 percent of the total number of possible games, and must make at least 50 three pointers the entire season.

== Three Point Percentage leaders ==
Season	Player	Position (Note: The player's primary position is listed first.)	Team	Games played	Three Pointers made	Three Pointers attempted	Three Point %	Ref.
2002–03	(Spain) Oscar Yebra	F	Forum Valladolid	34	68	139	.4892	
2003–04	(Argentina) (Italy) Jorge Racca	G/F	Leche Rio Breogán	28	61	126	.4841	
2004–05	(Spain) Oscar Yebra (2×)	F	Valencia Basket	30	63	130	.4846	
2005–06	(Spain) Paco Vazquez	G	Club Joventut Badalona		50	107	.4673	
2006–07	(United States) Terrell Myers	G	UCAM Murcia		52	113	.4602	
2007–08	(Spain) Jorge Garcia	G	Urbas Fuenlabrada	32	66	138	.4783	
2008–09	(Latvia) Kristaps Valters	G	Urbas Fuenlabrada	32	73	152	.4803	
2009–10	(Spain) Rafa Martínez	G	Valencia Basket	35	73	140	.5214	
2010–11	(United States) Cody Toppert	G	Río Ourense Termal	32	51	96	.5313	
2011–12	(Latvia) Kristaps Valters (2×)	G	Unicaja Málaga	29	52	110	.4727	
2012–13	(Argentina) (Italy) Andres Nocioni	F	Saski Baskonia	33	55	117	.4701	
2013–14	(Central African Republic) Romain Sato	G/F	Valencia Basket	34	51	102	.5102	
2014–15	(United States) Ryan Toolson	G	Unicaja Málaga	34	75	147	.5000	
2015–16	(United States) Jaycee Carroll	G	Real Madrid Baloncesto	34	87	164	.5305	
2016–17	(Spain) Rafa Martínez (2×)	G	Valencia Basket	32	58	122	.4754	
2017–18	(Spain) Rafa Martínez (3×)	G	Valencia Basket	31	64	129	.4961	
2018–19	(United States) Matt Thomas	G	Valencia Basket	29	63	130	.4787	
2019–20 (Note: The number of games played were reduced in this season due to the COVID-19 Pandemic)	(Spain) Axel Bouteille	G	RETABilbao Basket/Unicaja Málaga	23	55	121	.4545	
2020–21	(Montenegro) (Spain) Nikola Mirotić	F	FC Barcelona Bàsquet	30	53	109	.4862	
2021–22	(Canada) (United States) Kyle Wiltjer	F	Lenovo Tenerife	33	70	145	.4828	
2022–23	(United States) Markus Howard	G	Saski Baskonia	32	106	250	.4253	
