= Derek Anderson (basketball) =

American basketball player (born 1974)

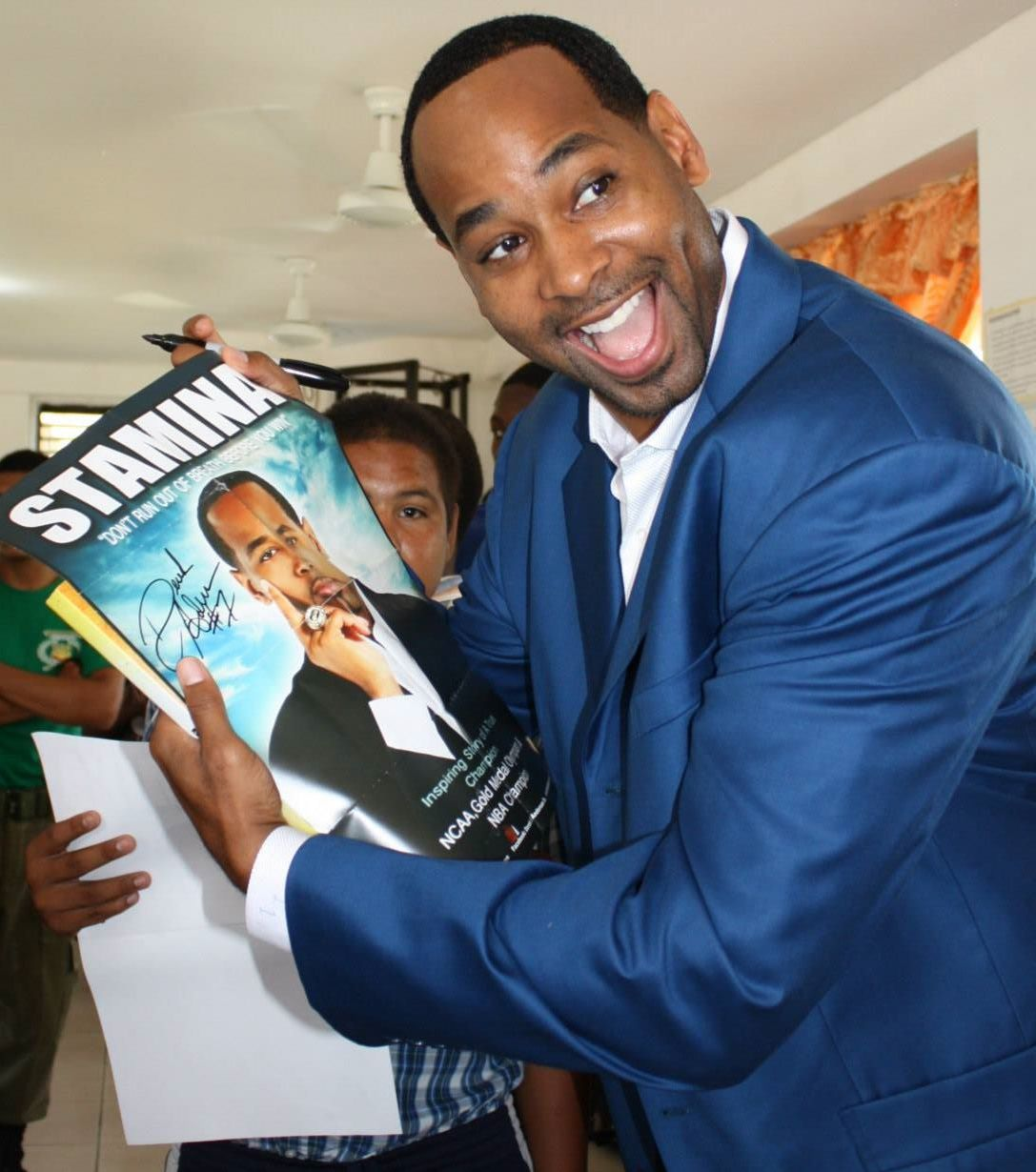
- Anderson in 2013

Personal information
- Born: July 18, 1974 (age 52) Louisville, Kentucky, U.S.
- Listed height: 6 ft 5 in (1.96 m)
- Listed weight: 195 lb (88 kg)

Career information
- High school: Doss (Louisville, Kentucky)
- College: Ohio State (1992–1994); Kentucky (1995–1997)
- NBA draft: 1997: 1st round, 13th overall pick
- Drafted by: Cleveland Cavaliers
- Playing career: 1997–2008
- Position: Shooting guard / small forward
- Number: 23, 1, 8, 5

Career history
- 1997–1999: Cleveland Cavaliers
- 1999–2000: Los Angeles Clippers
- 2000–2001: San Antonio Spurs
- 2001–2005: Portland Trail Blazers
- 2005–2006: Houston Rockets
- 2006: Miami Heat
- 2006–2008: Charlotte Bobcats

Career highlights
- NBA champion (2006); NBA All-Rookie Second Team (1998); NCAA champion (1996)

Career NBA statistics
- Points: 7,357 (12.0 ppg)
- Rebounds: 1,988 (3.2 rpg)
- Assists: 2,083 (3.4 apg)
- Stats at NBA.com
- Stats at Basketball Reference

Derek Lamont Anderson (born July 18, 1974) is an American former professional basketball player and current coach. He played eleven seasons in the National Basketball Association (NBA).

== College career ==
Anderson is a graduate of Doss High School in Louisville, Kentucky, and was an All-Star in the state of Kentucky. Anderson played college basketball at the Ohio State University and the University of Kentucky. In 1996, Anderson helped the University of Kentucky win the NCAA Men's Basketball Championship as part of a team that featured nine future NBA players under their coach Rick Pitino. Anderson went on to graduate from the University of Kentucky in 1997 with a degree in pharmacy.

== Professional career ==
Despite missing much of his senior season at Kentucky due to a torn anterior cruciate ligament (ACL), Anderson was selected by the Cleveland Cavaliers with the 13th overall pick in to the 1997 NBA draft. In his debut game on October 31, 1997, Anderson recorded 6 points, 3 rebounds, 1 block and 1 steal as the Cavaliers fell short to the Houston Rockets 86 - 94.

Anderson started the first 10 games of his career and had averages of 10 points, 3.9 rebounds and 2.7 assists in 35.2 minutes per game. After that tenth game, however, he started only three of the remaining 56 games of the season, as he lost his starting small forward spot to teammate Cedric Henderson.

He played for Cleveland from 1997 to 1999. He was the last Cavalier to wear #23 before LeBron James.

On August 4, 1999, he was traded by the Cleveland Cavaliers along with Johnny Newman to the L.A. Clippers for Lamond Murray. Anderson was ranked 7th in the NBA in free throw percentage (.877) in 1999–2000.

Exactly one year later, on August 4, 2000, Anderson signed as a free agent with the San Antonio Spurs. He was the starting shooting guard for the Spurs that entire 2000 - 2001 season and averaged 15.5 points, 4.4 rebounds, and 3.7 assists in 34.9 minutes per game. He helped the Spurs finish with a 58 - 24 record as they reached the Western Conference Finals that season.

After that sole season, Anderson was traded to the Portland Trail Blazers on July 25, 2001, along with Steve Kerr for a 2003 2nd-round pick (later selected to be Andreas Glyniadakis) and Steve Smith.

Anderson's NBA career was plagued by injuries. In the 2004–2005 season (his final season as a Trail Blazer) he only played in eight of the final 42 games, and missed similar numbers of games in prior seasons. On August 3, 2005, he was the first player in the league waived using the so-called "luxury tax amnesty clause" of the 2005 NBA collective bargaining agreement.

He signed with the Houston Rockets as a free agent on August 22, 2005. After playing 20 games for the Rockets (averaging 13.4 points, 5.1 rebounds and 3.3 assists with the team) he was traded to the Miami Heat in exchange for Gerald Fitch on February 23, 2006. The Heat had 28 games remaining in the season, with Anderson playing in 23 of them.

The Heat advanced to the 2006 NBA Finals and defeated the Dallas Mavericks in six games to give Anderson his first and only championship.

Anderson was waived by the Heat on September 12, 2006, prior to the beginning of the 2006–07 season. Several weeks later, on November 28, he signed with the Charlotte Bobcats; Anderson played the final two seasons of his career for the Bobcats.

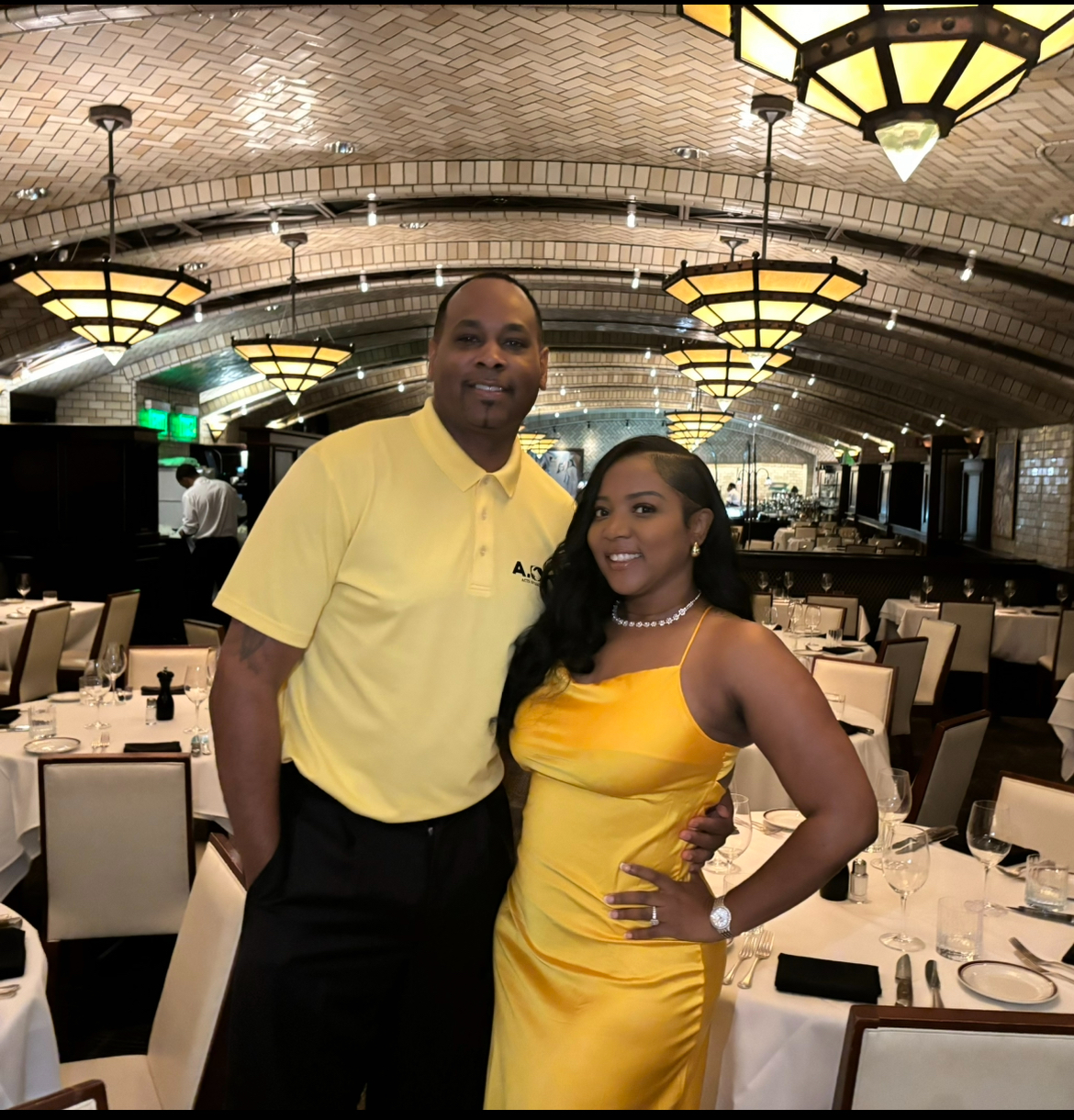
Derek Anderson and wife Jamie Anderson

Anderson's final NBA game was played on April 5, 2008, in a blowout loss to the Boston Celtics 78 - 101. In his final game, Anderson played for five and half minutes and only recorded one rebound as a statistic.

== Personal life and family ==
He is married to his wife, Jamie Anderson. The two met in their hometown of Louisville.

Following his retirement, Anderson transitioned into his role as Mental Health Counselor for The NBPA and has always been an active philanthropist. He and his wife, Jamie Anderson founded The Stamina Foundation (https://www.staminafd.com). The mission of the organization is to support and empower underserved youth, particularly those facing homelessness or adversity. The foundation provides programs focused on education, mentorship, and wellness, helping young people build the resilience and skills they need to succeed. In January 2023, Anderson also coached the Costa Rica national team in the United Cup of Champions season.

== NBA career statistics ==
Legend
GP	Games played	GS	Games started	MPG	Minutes per game
FG%	Field goal percentage	3P%	3-point field goal percentage	FT%	Free throw percentage
RPG	Rebounds per game	APG	Assists per game	SPG	Steals per game
BPG	Blocks per game	PPG	Points per game	**Bold**	Career high
†	Won an NBA championship	*	Led the league

=== Regular season ===
Year	Team	GP	GS	MPG	FG%	3P%	FT%	RPG	APG	SPG	BPG	PPG
1997–98	Cleveland	66	13	27.9	.408	.202	.873	2.8	3.4	1.3	**.2**	11.7
1998–99	Cleveland	38	13	25.7	.398	.304	.836	2.9	3.8	1.3	.1	10.8
1999–00	L.A. Clippers	64	58	34.4	**.438**	.309	**.877**	4.0	3.4	1.4	**.2**	**16.9**
2000–01	San Antonio	**82**	**82***	34.9	.416	**.399**	.851	**4.4**	3.7	**1.5**	**.2**	15.5
2001–02	Portland	70	27	26.6	.404	.373	.856	2.7	3.1	1.0	.1	10.8
2002–03	Portland	76	76	33.6	.427	.350	.859	3.5	4.3	1.2	**.2**	13.9
2003–04	Portland	51	46	**35.5**	.376	.305	.824	3.6	**4.5**	1.3	.1	13.6
2004–05	Portland	47	32	26.4	.389	.384	.805	2.7	3.0	.8	.1	9.2
2005–06	Houston	20	8	29.1	.393	.284	.836	4.2	2.7	.8	**.2**	10.8
2005–06†	Miami	23	3	20.2	.308	.313	.842	2.6	2.1	.3	.1	5.8
2006–07	Charlotte	50	32	23.8	.429	.355	**.877**	2.3	2.7	1.0	.1	8.0
2007–08	Charlotte	28	0	14.1	.376	.365	.737	1.9	1.6	.4	.0	5.0
Career		615	390	29.2	.408	.341	.853	3.2	3.4	1.1	.1	12.0

=== Playoffs ===
Year	Team	GP	GS	MPG	FG%	3P%	FT%	RPG	APG	SPG	BPG	PPG
1998	Cleveland	4	0	25.8	**.455**	.000	.885	2.3	**2.8**	**1.3**	**.3**	10.8
2001	San Antonio	7	**7**	**27.7**	.262	.273	.762	**2.7**	2.4	.4	.0	7.7
2002	Portland	3	0	25.3	.433	.333	**.889**	2.3	2.3	.7	.0	**14.7**
2003	Portland	2	2	11.0	.250	.000	.000	.5	.0	.0	.0	1.0
2006†	Miami	**8**	0	8.3	.300	**.357**	.875	1.1	.6	.3	.0	3.0
Career		24	9	19.2	.336	.302	.838	1.9	1.7	.5	.0	7.0
