= Sito Alonso =

Spanish basketball coach (born 1975)

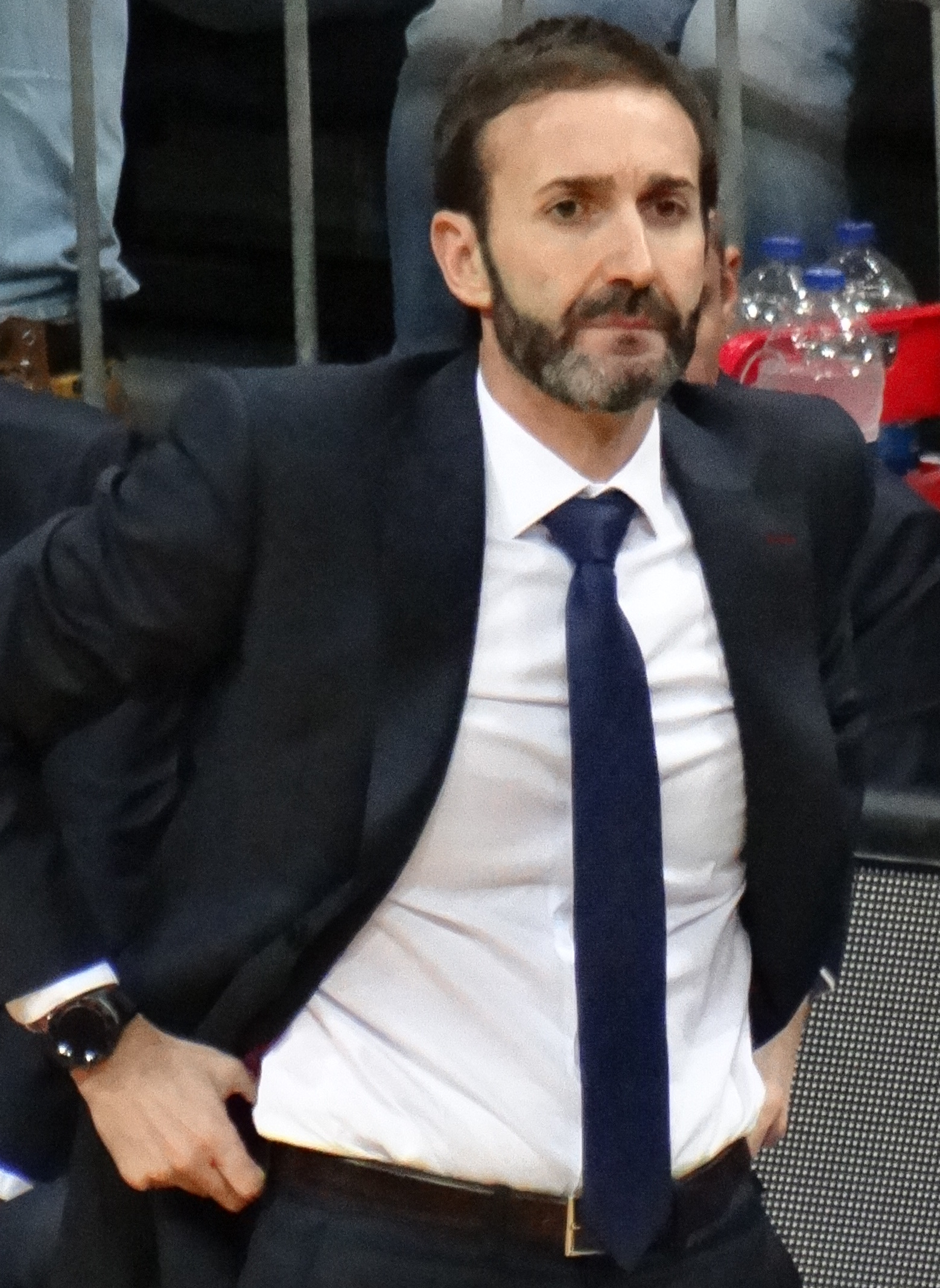
- Alonso with Barcelona, in 2018.

UCAM Murcia
- Position: Head coach
- League: Liga ACB

Personal information
- Born: 4 December 1975 (age 50) Madrid, Spain
- Coaching career: 1999–present

Career history

Coaching
- 1999–2004: CB Monzón
- 2004–2005: CB Prat
- 2005–2008: Joventut Badalona (assistant)
- 2008–2010: Joventut Badalona
- 2011–2014: Gipuzkoa Basket
- 2013: Spain U20
- 2014–2016: Bilbao Basket
- 2016–2017: Baskonia
- 2017–2018: FC Barcelona
- 2018: Cedevita
- 2019–present: Murcia
- 2025–2026: Latvia

Career highlights
- AEEB Spanish Coach of the Year (2012)
Medals
Men's basketball
Head Coach for Latvia
FIBA Europe Under-20 Championship
Bronze medal – third place	2013 Estonia	Team

Alfonso Alonso Blasco (born 4 December 1975), commonly known as Sito Alonso, is a Spanish professional basketball coach who is the head coach for Spanish Liga ACB club UCAM Murcia.

== Coaching career ==
=== Pro clubs ===
Alonso made his coaching debut in the Liga Endesa (Spanish League) in 2008, with Joventut Badalona, a team where he had previously worked as an assistant coach. He was sacked by the club in March 2010, after his team's poor results in Spain's national domestic league and in European-wide competition.

In 2011, Alonso once again became a head coach in Liga ACB, thanks to his signing of a new contract with Lagun Aro GBC. He left GBC in 2014 and signed with Spain's club Bilbao Basket.

In July 2016, he parted with Bilbao Basket, and he signed a two-year deal with Baskonia. Despite reaching the EuroLeague playoffs, Alonso and Baskonia split up after being eliminated by Valencia Basket in the semifinals of the domestic league play-offs. Consequently, he signed a two-year contract with an optional third with FC Barcelona Lassa. On 5 February 2018, FC Barcelona part ways with him.

On 8 June 2018 Alonso signed three-year contract with Cedevita Zagreb. On 25 October 2018, after a poor start of season, Cedevita sacked Alonso.

=== Spain national team ===
In the summer of 2013, Alonso was the head coach of the Spanish Under-20 junior national team, and he coached them to the bronze medal at the 2013 FIBA Europe Under-20 Championship, which was played in Tallinn, Estonia. He was also an assistant coach with the senior Spain national team at the 2014 FIBA World Cup.

Alonso was also the head coach of the Aragon autonomous basketball team in 2006. He only managed the team in their 92–69 win against Japan.

== Coaching record ==
Legend
G	Games coached	W	Games won	L	Games lost	W–L %	Win-loss %

Note: The EuroLeague is not the only competition in which the team played during the season. He also coached in domestic competition, and regional competition if applicable.

=== EuroLeague ===
Team	Year	G	W	L	W–L%	Result
Joventut	2008–09	10	4	6	.400	Eliminated in group stage
Baskonia	2016–17	33	17	16	.515	Eliminated in quarterfinals
Barcelona	2017–18	21	7	14	.333	Fired
Career		64	28	36	.438	

== Honours ==
=== Spain Under-20 ===
- FIBA Europe Under-20 Championship:
  - Bronze 2013

=== Individual ===
- AEEB Spanish Coach of the Year: 2012
