= Vallmajo =

Vallmajo is a surname. Notable people with the surname include:

- Jordán Vallmajo (1894–1983), Spanish wrestler
- Xavi Vallmajó (born 1975), Spanish basketball player
