= 1987–88 Primera División B de Baloncesto =

The 1987–88 Primera División B was the second category of the Spanish basketball league system during the 1987–88 season.

== Format ==
28 teams played this season.

- First phase
  - Two groups; called Even and Odd, with 14 teams each, where they all play against everyone in their group at two laps.
- Second phase
  - Group A: Made up of those classified in the 1st, 2nd an 3rd of each group.
  - Group B: Made up of those classified in the 4th, 5th an 6th of each group.
  - Group C: Made up of those classified in the 7th, 8th, 9th and 10th of each group.
  - Group D: Made up of those classified in the 11th, 12th, 13th and 14th of each group.
- Promotion
  - For the promotion playoffs, the teams from groups A, B and the top four from C participate. Before, the clubs from groups A and B play an intermediate round to determine the order of the top 12. They play the best of 3 games the 1st with 2nd, the 3rd with 4th and 5th against 6th of each group. Once the order is determined, they face the first 4 teams of group C during 3 rounds of elimination to the best of 3 games. The 2 winning teams of the last qualifying rounds go up. In all these qualifying rounds, the first and third matches are played at the home of the best classified in the previous phase. The two winners are promoted to the ACB League.
- Relegation
  - The last 4 of group C and the first 4 of D play the relegation playoff in a tie to the best of 5 games, where the first, second and fifth games are played at the home of the best classified in the previous phase. The losers go down to Segunda Division.
  - The last four of group D go down directly to the Segunda Division.

== Teams ==
=== Promotion and relegation (pre-season) ===
A total of 28 teams contested the league, including 22 sides from the 1986–87 season, two relegated from the 1986–87 ACB, one promoted from the Segunda División and three Wild Cards.

Teams relegated from Liga ACB

- Leche Río Breogán
- Clesa Ferrol

Teams promoted from Segunda División

- Caja San Fernando

Wild Cards

- Galeones Celta
- Salesianos Las Palmas
- Ten-Sur

=== Venues and locations ===
Location of teams in 1987–88 1ªDivisión
Group Odd; Group Even
Location of teams from the Canary Islands in 1987–88 1ªDivisión
Group Odd; Group Even
Location of teams from Galicia in 1987–88 1ªDivisión
Group Odd; Group Even

Team	Home city
BC Andorra	Andorra la Vella
Cafés Delta Badajoz	Badajoz
Caixa Ourense	Ourense
Caja San Fernando	Sevilla
Cajasur Córdoba	Córdoba
CB Askatuak	San Sebastián
CB Guadalajara	Guadalajara
CB Tizona	Burgos
CD Cajamadrid	Alcalá de Henares
Clesa Ferrol	Ferrol
Coalsa Bosco	La Coruña
Elosúa León	León
Finisterre Llíria	Llíria
Galeones Celta	Vigo
Júver Murcia	Murcia
Lagisa Gijón	Gijón
Leche Río Breogán	Lugo
Mayoral Maristas	Málaga
Metro Santa Coloma	Santa Coloma de Gramenet
Obradoiro Feiraco	Santiago de Compostela
Ordenadores ADP Mataró	Mataró
Pamesa Valencia	Valencia
Salesianos Las Palmas	Las Palmas
Tenerife AB	Santa Cruz de Tenerife
Ten-Sur	Arona
Toshiba Las Palmas	Las Palmas
Tradehi Oviedo	Oviedo
Valvi Girona	Girona

== First Round ==
=== Group Odd ===
Pos	Team	Pld	W	L	PF	PA	PD	Pts	Qualification or relegation
1	Leche Río Breogán	26	19	7	2501	2307	+194	45	Qualification to Group A
2	CB Askatuak	26	19	7	2470	2278	+192	45	Qualification to Group A
3	Tenerife AB	26	18	8	2425	2220	+205	44	Qualification to Group A
4	Mayoral Maristas	26	16	10	2472	2407	+65	42	Qualification to Group B
5	Caja San Fernando	26	15	11	2322	2235	+87	41	Qualification to Group B
6	Pamesa Valencia	26	15	11	2339	2276	+63	41	Qualification to Group B
7	CD Cajamadrid	26	13	13	2433	2303	+130	39	Qualification to Group C
8	Elosúa León	26	13	13	2432	2351	+81	39	Qualification to Group C
9	Obradoiro Feiraco	26	11	15	2250	2443	−193	37	Qualification to Group C
10	Tradehi Oviedo	26	11	15	2253	2249	+4	37	Qualification to Group C
11	BC Andorra	26	11	15	2327	2382	−55	37	Qualification to Group D
12	Finisterre Llíria	26	11	15	2422	2395	+27	37	Qualification to Group D
13	CB Guadalajara	26	10	16	2491	2517	−26	36	Qualification to Group D
14	Salesianos Las Palmas	26	0	26	2161	2935	−774	26	Qualification to Group D

Source: JM Almenzar Website

=== Group Even ===
Pos	Team	Pld	W	L	PF	PA	PD	Pts	Qualification or relegation
1	Clesa Ferrol	26	21	5	2364	2154	+210	47	Qualification to Group A
2	Valvi Girona	26	20	6	2396	2188	+208	46	Qualification to Group A
3	Toshiba Las Palmas	26	19	7	2398	2197	+201	45	Qualification to Group A
4	Metro Santa Coloma	26	15	11	2436	2407	+29	41	Qualification to Group B
5	Ordenadores ADP Mataró	26	15	11	2265	2255	+10	41	Qualification to Group B
6	Lagisa Gijón	26	15	11	2405	2395	+10	41	Qualification to Group B
7	Júver Murcia	26	15	11	2391	2346	+45	41	Qualification to Group C
8	CB Tizona	26	11	15	2304	2312	−8	37	Qualification to Group C
9	Cafés Delta Badajoz	26	11	15	2448	2483	−35	37	Qualification to Group C
10	Caixa Ourense	26	10	16	2228	2275	−47	36	Qualification to Group C
11	Ten-Sur	26	10	16	2347	2397	−50	36	Qualification to Group D
12	Cajasur Córdoba	26	8	18	2558	2683	−125	34	Qualification to Group D
13	Galeones Celta	26	6	20	2160	2313	−153	32	Qualification to Group D
14	Coalsa Bosco	26	6	20	2177	2472	−295	32	Qualification to Group D

Source: JM Almenzar Website

== Second Round ==
=== Group A ===
Pos	Team	Pld	W	L	PF	PA	PD	Pts	Qualification or relegation
1	Clesa Ferrol	10	8	2	898	830	+68	18	Qualification to 1st-2nd
2	Leche Río Breogán	10	6	4	870	822	+48	16	Qualification to 1st-2nd
3	Tenerife AB	10	5	5	882	871	+11	15	Qualification to 3rd-4th
4	Valvi Girona	10	5	5	832	854	−22	15	Qualification to 3rd-4th
5	Toshiba Las Palmas	10	4	6	806	842	−36	14	Qualification to 5th-6th
6	CB Askatuak	10	2	8	923	992	−69	12	Qualification to 5th-6th

Source: JM Almenzar Website

=== Group B ===
Pos	Team	Pld	W	L	PF	PA	PD	Pts	Qualification or relegation
1	Mayoral Maristas	10	10	0	1039	921	+118	20	Qualification to 7th-8th
2	Metro Santa Coloma	10	5	5	970	986	−16	15	Qualification to 7th-8th
3	Pamesa Valencia	10	5	5	933	902	+31	15	Qualification to 9th-10th
4	Caja San Fernando	10	4	6	874	875	−1	14	Qualification to 9th-10th
5	Ordenadores ADP Mataró	10	4	6	884	919	−35	14	Qualification to 11th-12th
6	Lagisa Gijón	10	2	8	940	1037	−97	12	Qualification to 11th-12th

Source: JM Almenzar Website

=== Group C ===
Pos	Team	Pld	W	L	PF	PA	PD	Pts	Qualification or relegation
1	CD Cajamadrid	14	12	2	1327	1228	+99	26	Qualification to promotion 13th-16th
2	Júver Murcia	14	9	5	1228	1220	+8	23	Qualification to promotion 13th-16th
3	CB Tizona	14	8	6	1267	1232	+35	22	Qualification to promotion 13th-16th
4	Tradehi Oviedo	14	8	6	1240	1202	+38	22	Qualification to promotion 13th-16th
5	Elosúa León	14	7	7	1284	1285	−1	21	Qualification to relegation
6	Obradoiro Feiraco	14	6	8	1259	1290	−31	20	Qualification to relegation
7	Cafés Delta Badajoz	14	3	11	1220	1291	−71	17	Qualification to relegation
8	Caixa Ourense	14	3	11	1267	1344	−77	17	Qualification to relegation

Source: JM Almenzar Website

=== Group D ===
Pos	Team	Pld	W	L	PF	PA	PD	Pts	Qualification or relegation
1	Finisterre Llíria	12	10	2	1198	1050	+148	22	Qualification to relegation
2	CB Guadalajara	12	9	3	1036	965	+71	21	Qualification to relegation
3	BC Andorra	12	8	4	1056	1025	+31	20	Qualification to relegation
4	Galeones Celta	12	6	6	1099	1085	+14	18	Qualification to relegation
5	Cajasur Córdoba	12	5	7	1132	1169	−37	17	Relegation to 2ª División
6	Ten-Sur	12	2	10	1037	1136	−99	14	Relegation to 2ª División
7	Salesianos Las Palmas	12	2	10	1047	1175	−128	14	Relegation to 2ª División
8	Coalsa Bosco	0	0	0	0	0	0	0	Leave the competition

Source: JM Almenzar Website

== PlayOffs ==
=== Intermediate playoff ===
Matches played to determine the final ranking.

Team 1	Series	Team 2	Game 1	Game 2	Game 3
Clesa Ferrol	2–1	Leche Río Breogán	76–86	99–90	100–81
Tenerife AB	2–1	Valvi Girona	96–78	89–92	101–76
Toshiba Las Palmas	2–1	CB Askatuak	64–70	83–82	105–86
Mayoral Maristas	2–0	Metro Santa Coloma	100–93	83–72	
Pamesa Valencia	2–1	Caja San Fernando	115–102	87–94	80–72
Ordenadores ADP Mataró	2–0	Lagisa Gijón	113–107	114–111	

=== Promotion playoffs ===
Third round winners are promoted to Liga ACB.

First Round
1 Clesa Ferrol	108	113
16 Tradehi Oviedo	83	80
8 Metro Santa Coloma	94	88
9 Pamesa Valencia	98	95
4 Valvi Girona	65	83	83
13 CD Cajamadrid	77	80	80
5 Toshiba Las Palmas	109	100
12 Lagisa Gijón	81	92
2 Leche Río Breogán	99	84
15 CB Tizona	81	92
7 Mayoral Maristas	83	92
10 Caja San Fernando	70	76
3 Tenerife AB	91	87
14 Júver Murcia	84	86
6 CB Askatuak	118	88
11 Ordenadores ADP Mataró	86	80

Second Round
1 Clesa Ferrol	105	100
9 Pamesa Valencia	86	91
4 Valvi Girona	73	67
5 Toshiba Las Palmas	93	91
2 Leche Río Breogán	81	79	88
7 Mayoral Maristas	80	84	93
3 Tenerife AB	82	85
6 CB Askatuak	96	95

Third Round
1 Clesa Ferrol	83	101	89
5 Toshiba Las Palmas	87	100	83
7 Mayoral Maristas	81	87
6 CB Askatuak	84	90

Promoted to Liga ACB
1 Clesa Ferrol
6 CB Askatuak

=== Relegation playoffs ===
Team 1	Series	Team 2	Game 1	Game 2	Game 3	Game 4	Game 5
Elosúa León	3–2	Galeones Celta	84–90	104–83	84–86	95–71	102–68
CAB Obradoiro	1–3	BC Andorra	86–97	86–87	86–81	88–117	
Cafés Delta Badajoz	1–3	CB Guadalajara	88–104	93–94	92–90	90–96	
Caixa Ourense	3–1	Finisterre Llíria	119–93	90–86	86–115	108–107	

== Final standings ==
Pos	Team	Pld	W	L	Qualification or relegation
1	Clesa Ferrol (P)	46	37	9	Promoted to ACB
2	CB Askatuak (P)	45	28	17	Promoted to ACB
3	Toshiba Las Palmas (P)	47	31	16	Promoted to ACB
4	Mayoral Maristas (P)	45	32	13	Promoted to ACB
5	Leche Río Breogán (P)	44	29	15	Promoted to ACB
6	Tenerife AB (P)	43	27	16	Promoted to ACB
7	Valvi Girona (P)	44	28	16	Promoted to ACB
8	Pamesa Valencia (P)	43	24	19	Promoted to ACB
9	Metro Santa Coloma	40	20	20	
10	Caja San Fernando	41	20	21	
11	Ordenadores ADP Mataró	40	21	19	Resigned to participate next season
12	Lagisa Gijón	40	17	23	
13	CD Cajamadrid	43	26	17	
14	Júver Murcia	42	24	18	
15	CB Tizona	42	19	23	Resigned to participate next season
16	Tradehi Oviedo	42	19	23	
17	Elosúa León	45	23	22	
18	Caixa Ourense	44	17	27	
19	CB Guadalajara	42	22	20	
20	BC Andorra	42	22	20	
21	Obradoiro Feiraco	44	18	26	Relegation to Segunda División
22	Cafés Delta Badajoz	44	15	29	Relegation to Segunda División
23	Finisterre Llíria (R)	42	22	20	Relegation to Segunda División
24	Galeones Celta (R)	43	13	30	Relegation to Segunda División
25	Cajasur Córdoba (R)	38	13	25	Relegation to Segunda División
26	Ten-Sur	38	12	26	Relegation to Segunda División
27	Salesianos Las Palmas (R)	38	2	36	Relegation to Segunda División
28	Coalsa Bosco (R)	26	6	20	Relegation to Segunda División

Source: hispaligas.net
(P) Promoted; (R) Relegated
