= Tyrone Nesby =

American basketball player (born 1976)

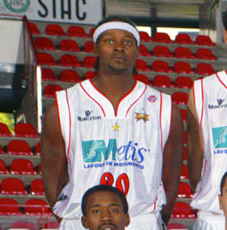

Personal information
- Born: January 31, 1976 (age 50) Cairo, Illinois, U.S.
- Listed height: 6 ft 6 in (1.98 m)
- Listed weight: 225 lb (102 kg)

Career information
- High school: Cairo (Cairo, Illinois)
- College: Vincennes (1994–1996); UNLV (1996–1998)
- NBA draft: 1998: undrafted
- Playing career: 1998–2007
- Position: Small forward / shooting guard
- Number: 8

Career history
- 1998–1999: Sioux Falls Skyforce
- 1999–2000: Los Angeles Clippers
- 2000–2002: Washington Wizards
- 2002–2003: Olympia Larissa
- 2003–2004: Metis Varese
- 2004: Reflex Belgrade
- 2004–2005: Lietuvos rytas Vilnius
- 2006–2007: Las Vegas Venom

Career highlights
- ULEB Cup champion (2005); Greek League All-Star (2003); Greek All-Star Game Slam Dunk champion (2003); First-team All-WAC (1997); NJCAA All-American (1996); Second-team Parade All-American (1994)

Career NBA statistics
- Points: 2,431 (9.5 ppg)
- Rebounds: 941 (3.7 rpg)
- Assists: 370 (1.5 apg)
- Stats at NBA.com
- Stats at Basketball Reference

Tyrone Lamont Nesby (born January 31, 1976) is an American former professional basketball player and coach. During his professional career, he spent three seasons playing in the National Basketball Association (NBA). He also played professionally in Europe.

== High school career ==
Nesby attended Cairo High School, in Cairo, Illinois, from 1990 to 1994. While at the school, he played competitive high school basketball. Nesby was an Illinois All-State first team selection in 1993 and 1994. He was also a Parade All-American second team selection in 1994.

== College career ==
Nesby attended Vincennes University, of the NJCAA, where he played college basketball, from 1994 to 1996. He was an NJCAA All-American selection in 1996. He then transferred and played with the UNLV Runnin' Rebels from 1996 to 1998. He was an All-Western Athletic Conference First Team selection in 1997.

== Professional career ==
After college, Nesby wasn't selected in the 1998 NBA draft. Nesby then started his professional career by signing with Sioux Falls Skyforce of the Continental Basketball Association (CBA). He was asked to join the NBA's Los Angeles Clippers' training camp, after playing successfully in the CBA, and later signed with them. With the Clippers, he averaged 10.1 points per game in his rookie season. He played two years with the Clippers, before being traded to the Washington Wizards, during the 2000–01 season. He stayed with the Wizards until the end of the 2001–02 season.

After his stint in the NBA, Nesby went to Europe, where he played for the Greek Basket League club Olympia Larissa, the Italian A League club Metis Varese, the Serbian Adriatic League club Reflex Belgrade, and the Lithuanian LKL League club Lietuvos rytas Vilnius. Nesby finished his pro career by playing with the Las Vegas Venom of the American Basketball Association (ABA).

== Coaching career ==
After he retired from playing professional basketball, Nesby began working as a basketball coach. On April 13, 2017, Nesby became the head coach at Muhlenberg High School, in Pennsylvania. On February 28, 2020, Nesby coached the Muhlenberg Pennsylvania High School basketball team to the PIAA District 3 5A Championship, at the Giant Center, in Hershey, Pennsylvania.

== NBA career statistics ==
Legend
GP	Games played	GS	Games started	MPG	Minutes per game
FG%	Field goal percentage	3P%	3-point field goal percentage	FT%	Free throw percentage
RPG	Rebounds per game	APG	Assists per game	SPG	Steals per game
BPG	Blocks per game	PPG	Points per game	**Bold**	Career high
*	Led the league

=== Regular season ===
Year	Team	GP	GS	MPG	FG%	3P%	FT%	RPG	APG	SPG	BPG	PPG
1998–99	L.A. Clippers	50*	36	25.8	**.449**	**.365**	.782	3.5	1.6	**1.5**	**.4**	10.1
1999–00	L.A. Clippers	**73**	**39**	**31.7**	.398	.335	.791	3.8	**1.7**	1.0	**.4**	**13.3**
2000–01	L.A. Clippers	14	12	23.7	.325	.217	.783	3.0	.8	.7	.3	7.7
2000–01	Washington	48	22	25.5	.366	.291	**.807**	2.7	1.4	.9	.3	8.4
2001–02	Washington	70	9	21.4	.435	.277	.688	**4.5**	1.3	.9	.3	6.3
Career		255	118	26.1	.404	.316	.772	3.7	1.5	1.0	.4	9.5
