= Moncho López =

Spanish basketball coach

Club Ourense Baloncesto
- Position: Head Coach
- League: Primera FEB

Personal information
- Born: 10 July 1969 (age 57) Ferrol, Spain
- Coaching career: 1995–present

Career history

Coaching
- 1995–1997: CB Galicia
- 1998–2002: Gijón Baloncesto
- 2002–2003: Spain
- 2003–2006: CB Breogán
- 2007: CDB Sevilla
- 2008–2011: Portugal
- 2009–2022: FC Porto
- 2015: Angola
- 2022–2023: Rizing Zephyr Fukuoka
- 2024–present: Ourense

Ramon López Suárez, known as Moncho López (born 10 July 1969), is a Spanish basketball manager, who currently serves as the head coach for Club Ourense of the Primera FEB.

== Coach career ==
López coached Baloncesto Galicia Ferrol (1995–1997) and Gijón Baloncesto (1998–2002), before taking office as the coach of Spain, which he guided to a silver medal at the EuroBasket 2003. After a brief spell at CB Sevilla, he was sacked after finishing 13th in the ACB. He was without a club when he was hired to coach the Portugal national basketball team, in January 2008. Portugal failed the direct qualification for the EuroBasket 2009, as well as the final play-offs. The team's performance at the EuroBasket 2011 qualification round lead to his dismissal from office.

Before leaving Portugal national team, he cumulated the coaching position in FC Porto since 2009.

On 10 February 2015 Moncho López was appointed head coach of the Angola national team for the 2015 AfroBasket, where he won the bronze medal. He left office in August 2015.
