= Etdrick Bohannon =

American basketball player

Personal information
- Born: May 29, 1973 (age 53) San Bernardino, California
- Listed height: 6 ft 9 in (2.06 m)
- Listed weight: 220 lb (100 kg)

Career information
- High school: Maine Central Institute (Pittsfield, Maine)
- College: Arizona (1992–1993); Tennessee (1994–1995); Auburn Montgomery (1995–1997)
- NBA draft: 1997: undrafted
- Playing career: 1997–2005
- Position: Forward
- Number: 21, 42, 41

Career history
- 1997–1998: Indiana Pacers
- 1999: Washington Wizards
- 2000: New York Knicks
- 2000: Los Angeles Clippers
- 2001: Cleveland Cavaliers
- 2001: Gijón Baloncesto
- 2002: Sioux Falls Skyforce
- 2005: Yakima Sun Kings
- Stats at NBA.com
- Stats at Basketball Reference

Etdrick S. Bohannon (born May 29, 1973) is an American former professional basketball player. He played in the NBA, among other leagues.

Born in San Bernardino, California, Bohannon attended the University of Arizona for one year, the University of Tennessee, and Auburn University Montgomery. He played four seasons in the NBA for five different teams (from 1997 to 2001). Though not drafted by an NBA team, he was selected in the CBA draft in 1997, by the Rockford Lightning. In 2001, he signed his first contract abroad, for helping Spanish team Gijón Baloncesto to avoid the relegation to the second league.

In 2005, he played for the Yakima Sun Kings of the CBA.

== Career playing statistics ==
Legend
GP	Games played	GS	Games started	MPG	Minutes per game
FG%	Field goal percentage	3P%	3-point field goal percentage	FT%	Free throw percentage
RPG	Rebounds per game	APG	Assists per game	SPG	Steals per game
BPG	Blocks per game	PPG	Points per game	**Bold**	Career high

=== NBA ===
==== Regular season ====
Year	Team	GP	GS	MPG	FG%	3P%	FT%	RPG	APG	SPG	BPG	PPG
1997–98	Indiana	5	0	2.2	.000	–	–	1.2	.2	.0	.4	.0
1998–99	Washington	2	0	2.0	–	–	–	.0	.0	.0	.0	.0
1999–00	New York	2	0	2.5	–	–	.750	.5	.0	.0	.0	1.5
1999–00	L.A. Clippers	**11**	0	**10.3**	**.538**	–	.600	**2.7**	**.5**	**.2**	**.5**	**2.4**
2000–01	Cleveland	6	0	3.2	.500	–	**1.000**	1.2	.0	.0	.3	1.3
Career		26	0	5.8	.429	–	.679	1.7	.2	.1	.4	1.2
