= 1999–2000 Los Angeles Clippers season =

NBA professional basketball team season

- Head coach: Chris Ford (fired); Jim Todd (interim)
- Owners: Donald Sterling
- Arena: Staples Center

Results
- Record: 15–67 (.183)
- Place: Division: 7th (Pacific); Conference: 14th (Western)
- Playoff finish: Did not qualify
- Stats at Basketball Reference

Local media
- Television: Fox Sports Net West 2, KCAL
- Radio: KXTA

The 1999–2000 Los Angeles Clippers season was the 30th season for the Los Angeles Clippers in the National Basketball Association, and their 16th season in Los Angeles, California.

== Season summary ==
=== Off-season ===
For the season, the Clippers moved into their new arena known as the Staples Center, and became co-tenants with their crosstown rival, the Los Angeles Lakers. The Clippers received the fourth overall pick in the 1999 NBA draft, and selected small forward Lamar Odom from the University of Rhode Island. During the off-season, the team acquired Derek Anderson from the Cleveland Cavaliers, and acquired Eric Murdock from the New Jersey Nets.

=== Regular season ===
With the addition of Odom and Anderson, the Clippers got off to a 4–7 start to the regular season. However, the team continued to struggle posting a nine-game losing streak afterwards, posting a 10-game losing streak in January, and then posting a 13-game losing streak in February, holding an 11–38 record at the All-Star break. Head coach Chris Ford was fired after an 11–34 start to the season, and was replaced with assistant coach Jim Todd as an interim coach; Ford would return coaching for the Philadelphia 76ers midway through the 2003–04 season. At mid-season, the team signed free agent Jeff McInnis, and then released Troy Hudson to free agency in March; Hudson averaged 8.8 points and 3.9 assists per game in 62 games. The Clippers then suffered a dreadful 17-game losing streak between March and April, finishing in last place in the Pacific Division with a league-worst 15–67 record.

Maurice Taylor averaged 17.1 points and 6.5 rebounds per game, while Anderson averaged 16.9 points and 1.4 steals per game, and Odom provided the team with 16.6 points, 7.8 rebounds, 4.2 assists and 1.3 blocks per game, and was named to the NBA All-Rookie First Team. In addition, second-year forward Tyrone Nesby contributed 13.3 points per game, while second-year center Michael Olowokandi provided with 9.8 points, 8.2 rebounds and 1.8 blocks per game, and three-point specialist Eric Piatkowski contributed 8.7 points per game. Meanwhile, McInnis averaged 7.2 points and 3.6 assists per game in 25 games, Murdock contributed 5.6 points, 2.7 assists and 1.2 steals per game, but only played just 40 games due to injury, second-year center Brian Skinner averaged 5.4 points, 6.1 rebounds and 1.3 blocks per game, but only appeared in just 33 games, and Keith Closs provided with 4.2 points, 3.1 rebounds and 1.3 blocks per game.

During the NBA All-Star weekend at The Arena in Oakland in Oakland, California, Odom and Olowokandi were both selected for the NBA Rookie Challenge Game, as Odom was a member of the Rookies team, while Olowokandi was a member of the Sophomores team. Odom scored 15 points along with 8 rebounds and 2 blocks, as the Rookies defeated the Sophomores in overtime, 92–83. Odom also finished in third place in Rookie of the Year voting, behind co-winners Elton Brand of the Chicago Bulls, and Steve Francis of the Houston Rockets.

The Clippers finished 28th in the NBA in home-game attendance, with an attendance of 559,714 at the Staples Center during the regular season, which was the second-lowest in the league; this was the first time since the 1992–93 season that the team did not have the lowest home-game attendance.

=== Aftermath ===
Following the season, Anderson signed as a free agent with the San Antonio Spurs, while Taylor signed with the Houston Rockets, Murdock retired and Todd was fired as head coach.

== Draft picks ==
Round	Pick	Player	Position	Nationality	College
1	4	Lamar Odom	SF/PF	United States	Rhode Island
2	31	Rico Hill	F	United States	Illinois State

== Roster ==
1999–2000 Los Angeles Clippers roster
Players

Pos.	No.	Player	Height	Weight	DOB	From
G	1	Derek Anderson	6 ft 5 in (1.96 m)	195 lb (88 kg)	––	Kentucky
F	30	Anthony Avent	6 ft 9 in (2.06 m)	240 lb (109 kg)	––	Seton Hall
F	41	Etdrick Bohannon	6 ft 10 in (2.08 m)	238 lb (108 kg)	––	Auburn Montgomery
F/C	24	Pete Chilcutt	6 ft 10 in (2.08 m)	230 lb (104 kg)	––	North Carolina
C	33	Keith Closs	7 ft 3 in (2.21 m)	215 lb (98 kg)	––	Central Connecticut State
F	31	Marty Conlon	6 ft 10 in (2.08 m)	224 lb (102 kg)	––	Providence
G	5	Jeff McInnis	6 ft 4 in (1.93 m)	179 lb (81 kg)	––	North Carolina
G	3	Eric Murdock	6 ft 1 in (1.85 m)	200 lb (91 kg)	––	Providence
G/F	8	Tyrone Nesby	6 ft 6 in (1.98 m)	225 lb (102 kg)	––	UNLV
F	7	Lamar Odom	6 ft 10 in (2.08 m)	221 lb (100 kg)	––	Rhode Island
C	34	Michael Olowokandi	7 ft 0 in (2.13 m)	270 lb (122 kg)	––	Pacific
G/F	52	Eric Piatkowski	6 ft 7 in (2.01 m)	215 lb (98 kg)	––	Nebraska
F/C	32	Brian Skinner	6 ft 9 in (2.06 m)	230 lb (104 kg)	––	Michigan
F	23	Maurice Taylor	6 ft 9 in (2.06 m)	260 lb (118 kg)	––	Michigan

Coaches
Head coach
- Jim Todd
Assistant(s)
- Kareem Abdul-Jabbar
- Dennis Johnson
- Rex Kalamian

Legend
- (DP) Unsigned draft pick
- (FA) Free agent
- (S) Suspended
- Injured

Roster
Updated: 2000-04-06

=== Roster Notes ===
- Point guard Troy Hudson was waived on March 27, 2000.
- Power forward Mario Bennett became the 7th former Laker to play with the crosstown rival Clippers.
- Power forward Pete Chilcutt played for the Clippers in two separate stints during the regular season; after playing for the Utah Jazz earlier in the season, he played for the Clippers on a 10-day contract in January, and was then released to free agency after it expired. He then played for the Cleveland Cavaliers on another 10-day contract, then released after that expired, and came back to the Clippers, who signed him for the remainder of the season.

== Regular season ==
=== Season standings ===
Pacific Division	W	L	PCT	GB	Home	Road	Div
y-Los Angeles Lakers	67	15	.817	–	36–5	31–10	20–4
x-Portland Trail Blazers	59	23	.720	8	30–11	29–12	21–3
x-Phoenix Suns	53	29	.646	14	32–9	21–20	15–9
x-Seattle SuperSonics	45	37	.549	22	24–17	21–20	12–12
x-Sacramento Kings	44	38	.537	23	30–11	14–27	9–15
Golden State Warriors	19	63	.232	48	12–29	7–34	2–22
Los Angeles Clippers	15	67	.183	52	10–31	5–36	5–19

#	Western Conference				
#	Team	W	L	PCT	GB
1	z-Los Angeles Lakers	67	15	.817	–
2	y-Utah Jazz	55	27	.671	12
3	x-Portland Trail Blazers	59	23	.720	8
4	x-San Antonio Spurs	53	29	.646	14
5	x-Phoenix Suns	53	29	.646	14
6	x-Minnesota Timberwolves	50	32	.610	17
7	x-Seattle SuperSonics	45	37	.549	22
8	x-Sacramento Kings	44	38	.537	23
9	Dallas Mavericks	40	42	.488	27
10	Denver Nuggets	35	47	.427	32
11	Houston Rockets	34	48	.415	33
12	Vancouver Grizzlies	22	60	.268	45
13	Golden State Warriors	19	63	.232	48
14	Los Angeles Clippers	15	67	.183	52

z - clinched division title
y - clinched division title
x - clinched playoff spot

== Player statistics ==
Legend
GP	Games played	GS	Games started	MPG	Minutes per game
FG%	Field-goal percentage	3P%	3-point field-goal percentage	FT%	Free-throw percentage
RPG	Rebounds per game	APG	Assists per game	SPG	Steals per game
BPG	Blocks per game	PPG	Points per game

Player	GP	GS	MPG	FG%	3P%	FT%	RPG	APG	SPG	BPG	PPG
Maurice Taylor	62	60	35.9	46.4	12.5	71.1	6.5	1.6	0.8	0.8	17.1
Derek Anderson	64	58	34.4	43.8	30.9	87.7	4.0	3.4	1.4	0.2	16.9
Lamar Odom	76	70	36.4	43.8	36.0	71.9	7.8	4.2	1.2	1.3	16.6
Tyrone Nesby	73	39	31.7	39.8	33.5	79.1	3.8	1.7	1.0	0.4	13.3
Michael Olowokandi	80	77	31.2	43.7	0.0	65.1	8.2	0.5	0.4	1.8	9.8
Troy Hudson	62	38	25.7	37.7	31.1	81.1	2.4	3.9	0.7	0.0	8.8
Eric Piatkowski	75	23	22.8	41.5	38.3	85.0	3.0	1.1	0.6	0.2	8.7
Jeff McInnis	25	10	23.9	43.0	33.3	76.5	2.9	3.6	0.6	0.1	7.2
Eric Murdock	40	15	17.3	38.5	38.1	63.8	1.9	2.7	1.2	0.1	5.6
Brian Skinner	33	9	23.5	50.7	0.0	66.2	6.1	0.3	0.5	1.3	5.4
Keith Closs	57	6	14.4	48.7	0.0	59.0	3.1	0.4	0.2	1.3	4.2
Charles Jones	56	0	11.8	32.8	33.1	73.9	1.1	1.7	0.5	0.1	3.4
Pete Chilcutt	24	2	14.5	49.2	31.3	100.0	3.3	0.7	0.4	0.3	3.0
Etdrick Bohannon	11	0	10.3	53.8	0.0	60.0	2.7	0.5	0.2	0.5	2.4
Anthony Avent	49	3	7.7	30.2	0.0	71.9	1.5	0.2	0.3	0.3	1.7
Marty Conlon	3	0	3.0	50.0	0.0	0.0	0.7	0.0	0.0	0.0	0.7
Mario Bennett	1	0	3.0	0.0	0.0	0.0	2.0	0.0	0.0	0.0	0.0

Player statistics citation:

== Awards and records ==
- Lamar Odom, NBA All-Rookie Team, First Team

== Transactions ==
The Clippers have been involved in the following transactions during the 1999–2000 season.

=== Trades ===
August 4, 1999
To Los Angeles Clippers

- Derek Anderson & Johnny Newman
To Cleveland Cavaliers

- Lamond Murray
August 8, 1999
To Los Angeles Clippers

- 2000 1st-round draft pick & 2002 1st-round draft pick
To Atlanta Hawks

- Lorenzen Wright
September 23, 1999
To Los Angeles Clippers

- Eric Murdock
To New Jersey Nets

- Johnny Newman

=== Re-signed ===
Player	Signed	Contract
Lamond Murray	August 4, 1999	7-year deal (sign & trade)
Eric Piatkowski	August 6, 1999	Four-year deal
Lorenzen Wright	August 8, 1999	7-year deal (sign & trade)
Tyrone Nesby	August 9, 1999	3-year deal (matched offer by San Antonio Spurs)

=== Additions ===
Player	Signed	Former team
Anthony Avent	October 4	Utah Jazz
Charles R. Jones	October 4	Chicago Bulls
Marty Conlon	December 17	Miami Heat
Pete Chilcutt	January 18 contract expired January 28 re-signed February 26	Utah Jazz; Cleveland Cavaliers
Jeff McInnis	February 26	Quad City Thunder (CBA)
Mario Bennett	March 7	Chicago Bulls
Etdrick Bohannon	March 27	Washington Wizards

=== Subtractions ===
Player	Left	New team
Rodney Rogers	free agency, August 3	Phoenix Suns
Darrick Martin	free agency, August 4	Sacramento Kings
Stojko Vrankovic	released, August 10	Fortitudo Pallacanestro Bologna (Serie B Basket)
Pooh Richardson	waived, September 9	Adecco Milano (Lega Basket Serie A)
Sherman Douglas	free agency, October 21	New Jersey Nets
Charles C. Smith	waived, October 28	Rockford Lightning (CBA)
Marty Conlon	waived, January 5	Jabones Pardo Fuenlabrada (Liga ACB)
Mario Bennett	contract expired, March 17	San Diego Wildfire (ABA)
Troy Hudson	waived, March 27	Orlando Magic

Player Transactions Citation:
