= Javier Pérez (basketball) =

Spanish basketball player

Javier Pérez Iniesta (born 16 March 1970 in Madrid) is a Spanish retired basketball player.

== Clubs ==
- 1988–90: Real Madrid
- 1990–98: Ourense Baloncesto
- 1998–99: Cantabria Baloncesto
- 1999–00: Gijón Baloncesto
- 2000–02: CI Rosalía de Castro

== Awards ==
- Copa del Rey (1): 1988–89
- Saporta Cup (1): 1988–89
