= Jim Todd =

American basketball coach (born 1952)

Personal information
- Born: 1952 (age 73–74) Billerica, Massachusetts, U.S.

Career information
- High school: Billerica Memorial (Billerica, Massachusetts)
- College: Fitchburg State (1972–1976)
- Coaching career: 1976–2014

Career history

Coaching
- 1976–1977: Notre Dame Prep
- 1977–1979: Fitchburg State
- 1979–1980: Framingham State (assistant)
- 1980–1984: Columbia (assistant)
- 1984–1986: Marist (assistant)
- 1986–1987: Manhattan (assistant)
- 1987–1996: Salem State
- 1996–1998: Milwaukee Bucks (assistant)
- 1998–2000: Los Angeles Clippers (assistant)
- 2000: Los Angeles Clippers (interim)
- 2003–2004: Milwaukee Bucks (assistant)
- 2004–2007: Toronto Raptors (assistant)
- 2007–2008: Milwaukee Bucks (assistant)
- 2008–2010: Atlanta Hawks (assistant)
- 2011–2012: Sacramento Kings (assistant)
- 2012–2014: New York Knicks (assistant)

James Todd (born 1952) is an American former professional basketball coach.

== Coaching career ==
=== Early career ===
Todd played four seasons on the basketball team at Fitchburg State University and graduated in 1976. He spent one season as head coach of the basketball team at Notre Dame Preparatory School where he led the team to a 24–2 record and the state championship. Todd then returned to Fitchburg State as the head coach for two seasons. He spent one season as an assistant coach for the Framingham State Rams. Todd moved to NCAA Division I when he was appointed as an assistant coach for the Columbia Lions in 1980. He served as an assistant coach for the Marist Red Foxes for two seasons and then spent one season as an assistant for the Manhattan Jaspers. On October 6, 1987, Todd was announced as head coach at Salem State College. He left Salem State in August 1996 to accept an assistant position with the Milwaukee Bucks. Todd was inducted into the Salem State Athletic Hall of Fame in 1998.

=== Los Angeles Clippers ===
Todd coached the Los Angeles Clippers for half a season in 2000, replacing Chris Ford. His focus was power forwards and centers. He was well known for his "Big Man" basketball camp dedicated to the development of post players.

=== Toronto Raptors & Milwaukee Bucks ===
Todd left the Toronto Raptors for the Milwaukee Bucks on June 13, 2007.

=== Atlanta Hawks ===
Todd joined the Atlanta Hawks coaching staff on July 16, 2008, where he was an assistant for two seasons.

=== Sacramento Kings ===
Todd joined the Sacramento Kings coaching staff as an assistant, on December 7, 2011.

=== New York Knicks ===
Todd joined the New York Knicks coaching staff as an assistant, on March 17, 2012.

Todd was fired with the rest of the Knicks staff on April 21, 2014.

== Head coaching record ==
Team	Year	G	W	L	W–L%	Finish	PG	PW	PL	PW–L%	Result
LA Clippers	1999–2000	37	4	33	.108	7th in Pacific	—	—	—	—	Missed playoffs
Career		37	4	33	.108		0	0	0	–	

== Personal life ==
Todd and his wife Gail, retired, reside in Westford, Massachusetts.
