= Xavi Vallmajó =

Spanish basketball player

Personal information
- Born: 19 February 1975 (age 51) Barcelona, Spain
- Listed height: 180 cm (5 ft 11 in)

Career information
- Playing career: 1992–2009
- Position: Point guard

Career history
- 1992–1997: Adepaf Figueres
- 1997–2003: Girona
- 2003–2005: Gijón
- 2005–2006: Palma Aqua Mágica
- 2006–2007: Lleida
- 2007–2008: Melilla
- 2008–2009: CB Villa de Los Barrios

Xavier Vallmajó Tercero (born 19 February 1975 in Barcelona, Spain) is a Spanish former professional basketball player. He played the point guard position.

== Personal life ==
Xavi's younger brother is basketball player Jordi Vallmajó Tercero.
