= United Cup of Champions =

- Organising body: United Cup
- Founded: 2014
- First season: 2014
- Countries: As of 2023: Belize; Canada; Costa Rica; Dominican Republic; United States
- Confederation: FIBA Americas
- Number of teams: 6
- Current champions: (Mexico) Correcaminos UAT Victoria (1st title) (2022)
- Most championships: (United States) GIE Maile Matrix (4 titles)
- Website: www.theunitedcup.org

The United Cup of Champions is an international annual basketball tournament for club teams in the Central Americas and Northern America. The league is traditionally held with 6 teams over a period of a week in the Gran Arena del Cibao in Santiago, the capital of the Dominican Republic.

== History ==
The United Cup was first played in 2014.

In the United Cup's second season, in 2015, six teams for the Dominican Republic and the United States participated. The GIE Maile Matrix were the inaugural champions after finishing the season with a 3–1 record and beating GUG in the finals. In the 2016, Academia de La Montana de Medellin from Colombia joined the league. In 2019, the HAB Caicos Sonics from the Turks and Caicos Islands made their debut in the league. In 2019, Fenix Santiago from Guatemala and the Tonga national team played in the United Cup. The following year, in 2020, the Chiba Seals from Japan joined. The 2022 saw the United Kingdom's Sheffield Bulldogs join the competition as well as the Correcaminos UAT Victoria from Mexico, who immediately won the title.

The 2023 season will take place from January 10 to January 13, 2023, with teams from a record 5 countries (those being Belize, Canada, Dominican Republic, United States and Costa Rica). The national teams from Belize and Costa Rica represented their countries.

== Current teams ==
Team	Location
Costa Rica (NT)	Costa Rica
Belize (NT)	Belize
(United States) Atlanta Savage	Atlanta, Georgia, United States
(Dominican Republic) Immortals Cibao	Cibao, Dominican Republic
(Dominican Republic) BC Uprise	Santiago, Dominican Republic
(Dominican Republic) Fénix Baloncesto	Santiago, Dominican Republic

== Champions ==
Edition	Season	Champions	Runners-up	Finals score	Finals MVP	Third place	Fourth place
2	2015	(United States) GIE Maile Matrix	(Dominican Republic) GUG	81–76	Ethan Bradshaw	No third place game	
3	2016	(United States) GIE Maile Matrix (2)	(Dominican Republic) Plaza	90–78	Keith Closs	No third place game	
4	2017	(United States) GIE Maile Matrix (3)	(United States) Houston Havoc	86–72	Jermaine Barnes	No third place game	
5	2018	(United States) GIE Maile Matrix (4)	(Dominican Republic) GUG	85–80	Langston Nolley	No third place game	
6	2019	Tonga (NT)	(United States) Atlanta Blaze	101–90	Stefan Bradford	(Guatemala) Fenix Santiago	(Dominican Republic) Plaza Fernando Valerio
7	2020	(Dominican Republic) Santiago Basket	(United States) GIE Maile Matrix	90–72	Ameth Gil	No third place game	
8	2021	(Dominican Republic) Santiago Basket (2)	(United States) GIE Maile Matrix	82–77	Oliver Garcia	No third place game	
9	2022	(Mexico) Correcaminos UAT Victoria	(Dominican Republic) Fénix Baloncesto	–	Marquin Chandler	No third place game	
