= Óscar Yebra =

Spanish basketball player

Personal information
- Born: July 15, 1974 (age 52) León, Spain
- Listed height: 6 ft 7 in (2.01 m)
- Listed weight: 209 lb (95 kg)

Career information
- Playing career: 1992–2011
- Position: Small forward

Career history
- 1992–1993: Sant Josep Badalona
- 1993–1998: Baloncesto León
- 1998–1999: CSP Limoges
- 1999–2001: Gijón Baloncesto
- 2001–2004: CB Valladolid
- 2004–2006: Valencia BC
- 2006–2008: CB Valladolid
- 2008–2009: Mahram Tehran
- 2009–2010: CEB Llíria
- 2010–2011: Melilla Baloncesto

Career highlights
- 2× Liga ACB three-point field goal percentage leader (2003, 2005)

Óscar Yebra Fernández (born 15 July 1974 in León) is a Spanish former professional basketball player.

He represented the Spanish national team at the 2004 Summer Olympics. As of March 2020, he is coaching in China.
