= Aragon autonomous basketball team =

Aragón
- National federation: Aragonese Basketball Federation

First international
- Aragon 75–77 Uruguay (Zaragoza, Spain; 28 June 2003)

Biggest win
- Aragon 92–69 Japan (Zaragoza, Spain; 24 June 2006)

Biggest defeat
- Castile and León 104–79 Aragon (Palencia, Spain; 20 June 2007)

The Aragon autonomous basketball team is the basketball team of Aragon. The team is not affiliated to FIBA, so only plays friendly games.

== History ==
The first appearance of Aragon team was in 2005, in Zaragoza and they were defeated in the overtime by Uruguay. Next year, another friendly game was played this time at Huesca with Lithuania, and the team was defeated again.

Aragon played a total of five games.

== Games played ==
28 June 2003	Aragon	75–77OT	Uruguay	Zaragoza
	Scoring by quarter: 16–19, 2512, 11–19, 18–20, Overtime: 5–7
	Pts: Vidaurreta 19	Report; Report	Pts: Mazzarino 16	Arena: Pabellón Príncipe Felipe; Attendance: 4,500; Referees: Gallo, Peruga

23 June 2004	Aragon	68–88	Lithuania	Huesca
	Scoring by quarter: 13–24, 22–20, 20–21, 13–25
	Pts: A. Angulo 20	Report	Pts: Serapinas 16	Arena: Palacio de Deportes; Attendance: 2,500; Referees: Grazauskas, Peruga

2 July 2005	Aragon	78–82	Cuba	Teruel
	Scoring by quarter: 21–20, 20–19, 23–19, 14–24
	Pts: Biota 24	Report	Pts: Jennott 21	Arena: Pabellón Los Planos; Attendance: 1,300; Referees: Gallo, Estrada

24 June 2006	Aragon	92–69	Japan	Zaragoza
		Report		Arena: Pabellón Príncipe Felipe; Attendance: 2,000

20 June 2007	Castile and León	104–79	Aragon	Palencia
	Pts: González 15		Pts: Legasa 26	Arena: Pabellón Marta Domínguez; Referees: Carpallo, Cuesta
