= Gijón Baloncesto =

- Founded: 1982
- Dissolved: 2009
- Arena: Palacio de Deportes
- Capacity: 5,000
- Location: Gijón, Spain
- Team colors: White and red
| Home | Away |

Gijón Baloncesto was a basketball team based in Gijón, Asturias, Spain.

== History ==
First club logo, used until 2000.

Gijón Baloncesto was established in 1982, after taking over the franchise of another local team, Real Grupo de Cultura Covadonga, who was undergoing financial difficulties. In its first year, the club played in the third tier and immediately promoted to Primera División B, the second division in the Spanish league system.

GB continued playing in the second tier from 1984 to 1995, when the club achieves promotion to Liga ACB after finishing runner-up of the 1994–95 Liga EBA and beating Ernesto Electrodomésticos in the semifinal game. The club only remained one season and could not avoid relegation by losing the relegation playoffs against Xacobeo 99 Ourense by 1–3.

From 1996 to 1999, Gijón Baloncesto played in the new second league: LEB. It came back to ACB in 1999 by beating Menorca 3–0 in the semifinal of the promotion playoffs. In this second era in ACB, Gijón Baloncesto remained for three seasons until the relegation in 2002. After the relegation, the club started its decline until being relegated to the third tier in 2007 by losing the relegation play-offs against Aguas de Gandía Valencia and finally being dissolved in 2009 after spending its two last seasons in LEB Plata.

== Sponsorship ==
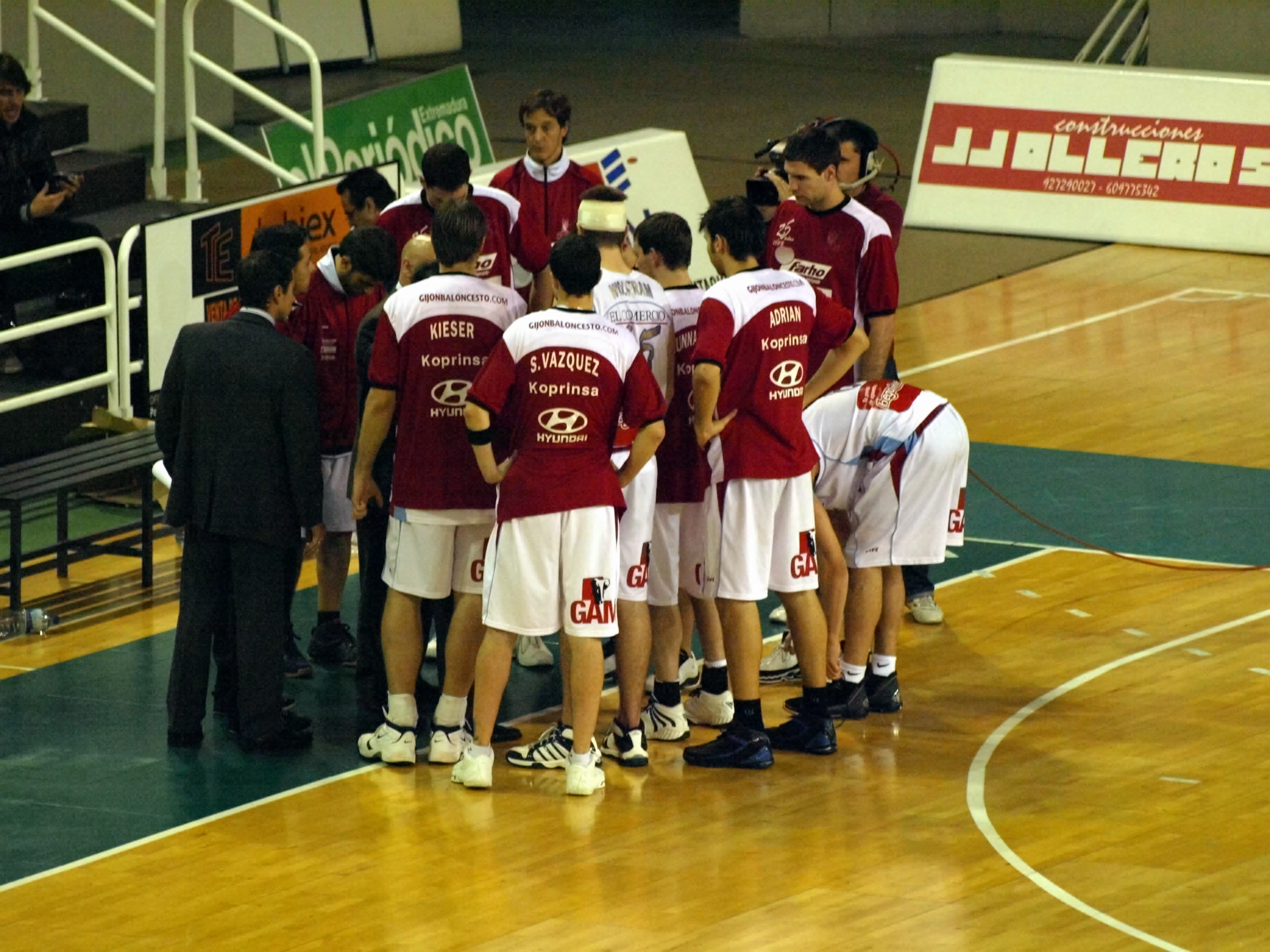
The roster of the 2007–08 season, during a timeout at Cáceres 2016.

- Iveco: 1983–1984
- Trébol: 1984–1985
- Lagisa: 1985–1992
- CLAS: 1992–1993
- Trébol: 1993–1995
- Cabitel: 1998–2000
- Isastur: 2002–2003
- Calefacciones Farho: 2003–2008
- Viopisa: 2008–2009

== Head coaches ==
- Pedro Zorrozúa 1982–1983
- José Antonio Figueroa 1983–1984
- Ed Johnson 1984–1985, 1988–1989, 1991
- Ricardo Hevia 1985–1987
- Emilio de Diego 1987
- Trifón Poch 1987–1988
- Eduardo Ayuso 1988
- Antonio Garrido 1990–1991, 1992
- Víctor Lago 1989, 1991–1992, 1992
- Ángel Martín-Benito 1993
- Bill McCammon 1993–1995
- Iñaki Iriarte 1995–1996
- Luis Casimiro 1996–1997
- Vicente Charro 1997
- Pepe Rodríguez 1997–1998
- Moncho López 1998–2002
- Moncho Fernández 2002–2005
- Diego Tobalina 2005–2006
- Joaquín Prado 2006–2007
- Jorge Elorduy 2007–2008
- Jenaro Díaz 2008–2009
- Guillermo Arenas 2021-2022

== Season by season ==
| Season | Tier | Division | Pos. | W–L | Cup competitions | | Roster |
|---|---|---|---|---|---|---|---|
| 1982–83 | 3 | 2ª División | 1st | 27–2 | | | |
| 1983–84 | 2 | 1ª División B | 6th | 13–13 | | | |
| 1984–85 | 2 | 1ª División B | 10th | 12–14 | | | |
| 1985–86 | 2 | 1ª División B | 11th | 15–16 | | | |
| 1986–87 | 2 | 1ª División B | 14th | 18–16 | | | |
| 1987–88 | 2 | 1ª División B | 12th | 17–23 | | | |
| 1988–89 | 2 | 1ª División | 5th | 20–13 | | | |
| 1989–90 | 2 | 1ª División | 12th | 14–20 | | | Leonard Allen, Óscar Alocén, Manel Bosch, Evaristo Blázquez, Felipe García, Carlos López, Raúl López, José Carlos Lucas, Óscar Moro, Javier Puig, Jimmy Wright. Coach: Víctor Lago, Antonio Garrido. |
| 1990–91 | 2 | 1ª División | 8th | 20–19 | | | Josechu Astarloa, Pepito Fernández, Alfonso León, Álvaro López, Raúl López, Óscar Moro, Antonio Pérez-Campoamor, Kenny Perry, David Serra, Jesús Yarza. Coaches: Antonio Garrido, Ed Johnson. |
| 1991–92 | 2 | 1ª División | 7th | 22–19 | | | Pepe Calvelo, José Antonio Carreño, José Luis Casaprima, Pepito Fernández, Antonio Pérez-Campoamor, Bob Harstad, Ramón Hernández, Álvaro López, Raúl López, Óscar Moro, Patrick Reynolds, Borja Rodríguez, David Serra. Coach: Víctor Lago. |
| 1992–93 | 2 | 1ª División | 18th | 15–19 | | | Juanmi Alonso, Cristian Bové, Pepe Calvelo, José Antonio Carreño, Roberto Carvajal, Sergio Cortés, Mario García, Gontxo González, Bob Harstad, Ramón Hernández, Juanjo López, Raúl López, Óscar Peña, Matt White. Coaches: Antonio Garrido, Víctor Lago, Ángel Martín-Benito. |
| 1993–94 | 2 | 1ª División | 7th | 19–18 | | | Gabriel Abrines, Pepe Calvelo, Roberto Carvajal, Sergio Cortés, David Fernández, Javier Hierro, Johnny McDowell, Pablo Noguero, Ángel de Pablos, César Rioja, David Sierra. Coach: Bill McCammon. |
| 1994–95 | 2 | Liga EBA | 1st | 29–10 | | | Roberto Carvajal, José Luis Casaprima, Arturo Cavero, Sergio Cortés, Borja Fernández, David Fernández, Paco Gómez, Toño Grana, Juan Antonio Hernández, Juanjo Meana, Johnny McDowell, Pablo Noguero. Coach: Bill McCammon. |
| 1995–96 | 1 | Liga ACB | 20th | 9–33 | | | Joaquín Arcega, James Blackwell, Pere Capdevila, Roberto Carvajal, Sergio Cortés, Juan Antonio Hernández, Kevin Holland, Pablo Noguero, Julián Ortiz, Brad Sellers, José María Silva, Michael Smith, Glen Whisby. Coaches: Bill McCammon, Iñaki Iriarte. |
| 1996–97 | 2 | LEB | 5th | 20–11 | Copa Príncipe | RU | José Antonio Carreño, Celso Finck, Mike Giomi, Juan Antonio Hernández, Cornelius Holden, Carles Marco, Pablo Noguero, Ime Oduok, Ángel de Pablos, Ángel Pazos, Paco Vázquez. Coach: Luis Casimiro. |
| 1997–98 | 2 | LEB | 9th | 13–15 | | | José Antonio Carreño, Perry Carter, Pichi Hidalgo, Ferran Laviña, Carles Marco, Chema Moreno, Ángel Pazos, Diego Sánchez, José María Silva, Chad Varga. Coaches: Vicente Charro, Pepe Rodríguez. |
| 1998–99 | 2 | LEB | 2nd | 26–13 | Copa Príncipe | QF | José Antonio Carreño, Óscar Cobelo, José Ramón Esmorís, Luis Merino, Josep Pacreu, Javi Rodríguez, Óscar Rodríguez, Pedro Rodríguez, Diego Sánchez, Luis Scola, Rubén Suárez, Linton Townes, Carlos Uzal. Coach: Moncho López. |
| 1999–00 | 1 | Liga ACB | 16th | 11–23 | | | Óscar Cobelo, Álex Escudero, José Ramón Esmorís, Jackie Espinosa, Hernán Jasen, Terquin Mott, Miroslav Pecarski, Javi Pérez, Óscar Rodríguez, Tomás Jofresa, Luis Scola, Glen Whisby, Óscar Yebra. Coach: Moncho López. |
| 2000–01 | 1 | Liga ACB | 15th | 11–23 | | | Etdrick Bohannon, José Ramón Esmorís, Ricardo Guillén, Stephen Howard, Hernán Jasen, Tomás Jofresa, Eric Johnson, FJ Martín, Javi Rodríguez, Lou Roe, Ryan Stack, Rafa Talaverón, Óscar Yebra. Coach: Moncho López. |
| 2001–02 | 1 | Liga ACB | 18th | 6–28 | | | Josep Cargol, José Ramón Esmorís, Todd Fuller, Guilherme Giovannoni, Antxon Iturbe, Borja Larragán, José López Valera, Corey Louis, Josep Pacreu, Pedro Robles, Javi Rodríguez, Manu Sánchez, Lou Roe, Thierry Zig. Coach: Moncho López. |
| 2002–03 | 2 | LEB | 8th | 16–18 | | | Rubén Burgos, Jon Cortaberría, Jordi Grimau, Antxon Iturbe, Joe Modderman, Chus Poves, Jared Prickett, Francis Perujo, Manu Sánchez, Rubén Suárez, Iker Urreizti. Coach: Moncho Fernández. |
| 2003–04 | 2 | LEB | 12th | 15–19 | | | Armando Álvarez, Saúl Blanco, Antxon Iturbe, Jacob Jaacks, Pep Ortega, Pep Pacreu, José María Panadero, Jared Prickett, Rubén Suárez, Xavi Vallmajó, Tom Wideman. Coach: Moncho Fernández. |
| 2004–05 | 2 | LEB | 10th | 15–19 | | | Saúl Blanco, Antxon Iturbe, Jorge Lledó, Pep Ortega, Pep Pacreu, Chus Poves, Rubén Suárez, Xavi Vallmajó, Keith Waleskowski, Tim Young. Coach: Diego Tobalina. |
| 2005–06 | 2 | LEB | 12th | 15–19 | | | Mark Bigelow, Bryan Defares, Josh Fisher, Antxon Iturbe, Juan Ignacio Jasen, Francis Koffi, Marco McCottry, Roberto Morentin, Iñaki Narros, Chus Poves, Rubén Suárez, Brandon Wolfram. Coaches: Diego Tobalina, Joaquín Prado. |
| 2006–07 | 2 | LEB | 17th | 15–24 | | | Miroslav Berić, Mark Bigelow, Logi Gunnarsson, Antxon Iturbe, Ian Johnson, Dani López, Txomin López, Iñaki Narros, Chus Poves, Peter Rajniak, Rubén Suárez, Isma Torres, Keith Waleskowski. Coaches: Joaquín Prado, Jorge Elorduy. |
| 2007–08 | 3 | LEB Plata | 3rd | 26–12 | Copa LEB Plata | SF | Sergio Alonso, José María Balmón, Curtis Bobb, Adrián García, Dani González, Logi Gunnarsson, David Jandl, Matt Kiefer, Lucian Kieser, Jesús Pineda, Peter Rajniak, Rubén Suárez, Sony Vázquez, Brandon Wolfram. Coach: Jorge Elorduy. |
| 2008–09 | 3 | LEB Plata | 13th | 10–20 | | | Ted Berry, Jeff Bonds, Fran Cano, Jorge Coelho, Michel Diouf, Juanjo Fariña, Dani González, Robert Hines, Aaron Molnar, David Ortega, Žiga Pihlar, Sergio Rodríguez, Rubén Suárez, Tarick Johnson. Coach: Jenaro Díaz. |

== Notable players ==
- (Spain) Carles Marco
- (Spain) Tomàs Jofresa
- (Spain) Óscar Yebra
- (Spain) Saúl Blanco
- (Spain) Javi Rodríguez
- (Spain) Xavi Vallmajó
- (Argentina) Luis Scola
- (Argentina) Hernán Jasen
- (United States) Bob Harstad
- (United States) James Blackwell
- (United States) Etdrick Bohannon
- (United States) Glen Whisby
- (United States) Michael Smith
- (United States) Brad Sellers
- (United States) Linton Townes
- (United States) Terquin Mott
- (United States) Lou Roe
- (United States) Eric Johnson
- (United States) Ryan Stack
- (United States) Etdrick Bohannon
- (United States) Stephen Howard
- (United States) Todd Fuller
- (France) Thierry Zig
- (Serbia) Miroslav Pecarski
- (Brazil) Guilherme Giovannoni
- (United States) Larry Moffett

== Individual awards ==
ACB Most Valuable Player

- Lou Roe – 2001
