= 1986–87 Primera División B de Baloncesto =

The 1986–87 Primera División B was the second category of the Spanish basketball league system during the 1986–87 season.

== Format ==
24 teams played this season.

- First phase
  - Two groups; called Even and Odd, with 12 teams each, where they all play against everyone in their group at two laps.
- Second phase
  - Group B1: Made up of those classified in the 1st, 2nd, 3rd, 4th, 5th and 6th of each group.
  - Group B2: Made up of those classified in the 7th, 8th, 9th, 10th,11th and 12th of each group.
- Promotion
  - Top two teams of Group B1 are promoted to the ACB League.
- He had planned a third phase of play-off, where those classified 2nd to 9th of B1 would play for the second promotion and from 3 to 10th of B2 would play to avoid two of the four relegations. However, this phase was never played due to a conflict between the clubs and the FEB on account of the number of promotions, which finally went from three to two. Thus, there were no decreases, increasing the category from 24 to 28 teams for the following season.

== Teams ==
=== Promotion and relegation (pre-season) ===
A total of 24 teams contested the league, including 11 sides from the 1986–87 season, three relegated from the 1985–86 ACB, four promoted from the Segunda División and six Wild Cards.

Teams relegated from Liga ACB

- CD Cajamadrid
- Coronas Las Palmas
- Metro Santa Coloma

Teams promoted from Segunda División

- BC Andorra
- Caixa Ourense
- CB Guadalajara
- Elosúa León

Wild Cards

- Coalsa Bosco
- Tradehi Oviedo
- Pamesa Valencia
- Colecor Córdoba
- Ecoahorro Maristas
- CB Badajoz

Teams that resigned to participate

- RC Nautico sold his place to Tenerife AB
- Seguros Caudal
- Canoe NC
- CB Hospitalet sold his place to Valvi Girona
- Institución Logos sold his place to Júver Murcia

=== Venues and locations ===
Location of teams in 1986–87 1ªDivisión
Group Odd; Group Even
Location of teams from the Canary Islands in 1986–87 1ªDivisión
Group Odd; Group Even

Team	Home city
Bancobao Villalba	Collado Villalba
BC Andorra	Andorra la Vella
Caixa Ourense	Ourense
Caja de Ronda	Málaga
CB Badajoz	Badajoz
CB Guadalajara	Guadalajara
CB Tizona	Burgos
CD Cajamadrid	Alcalá de Henares
Choleck Llíria	Llíria
Coalsa Bosco	La Coruña
Colecor Córdoba	Córdoba
Coronas Las Palmas	Las Palmas
Ecoahorro Maristas	Málaga
Elosúa León	León
Júver Murcia	Murcia
Lagisa Gijón	Gijón
Metro Santa Coloma	Santa Coloma de Gramenet
Obradoiro Feiraco	Santiago de Compostela
Ordenadores ADP Mataró	Mataró
Pacharán La Navarra	San Sebastián
Pamesa Valencia	Valencia
Tenerife AB	Santa Cruz de Tenerife
Tradehi Oviedo	Oviedo
Valvi Girona	Girona

== First Round ==
=== Group Odd ===
Pos	Team	Pld	W	L	PF	PA	PD	Pts	Qualification or relegation
1	CD Cajamadrid	22	20	2	2159	1946	+213	42	Qualification to Group B1
2	CB Tizona	22	14	8	1957	1888	+69	36	Qualification to Group B1
3	Elosúa León	22	14	8	1981	1921	+60	36	Qualification to Group B1
4	Obradoiro Feiraco	22	13	9	2053	1995	+58	35	Qualification to Group B1
5	Metro Santa Coloma	22	12	10	1984	1926	+58	34	Qualification to Group B1
6	Valvi Girona	22	12	10	1804	1785	+19	34	Qualification to Group B1
7	Pamesa Valencia	22	10	12	1934	1949	−15	32	Qualification to Group B2
8	Lagisa Gijón	22	10	12	1982	2010	−28	32	Qualification to Group B2
9	Tenerife AB	22	8	14	1921	1937	−16	30	Qualification to Group B2
10	Júver Murcia	22	7	15	2012	2141	−129	29	Qualification to Group B2
11	BC Andorra	22	6	16	1853	1986	−133	28	Qualification to Group B2
12	Tradehi Oviedo	22	6	16	1943	2099	−156	28	Qualification to Group B2

Source: JM Almenzar Website

=== Group Even ===
Pos	Team	Pld	W	L	PF	PA	PD	Pts	Qualification or relegation
1	Coronas Las Palmas	22	14	8	2086	1914	+172	36	Qualification to Group B1
2	Caja de Ronda	22	14	8	2089	1961	+128	36	Qualification to Group B1
3	Choleck Llíria	22	14	8	1943	1896	+47	36	Qualification to Group B1
4	Ordenadores ADP Mataró	22	14	8	2015	1986	+29	36	Qualification to Group B1
5	Bancobao Villalba	22	13	9	2015	2053	−38	35	Qualification to Group B1
6	CB Guadalajara	22	12	10	1936	1916	+20	34	Qualification to Group B1
7	Caixa Ourense	22	11	11	1951	1946	+5	33	Qualification to Group B2
8	CB Badajoz	22	11	11	1913	1996	−83	33	Qualification to Group B2
9	Pacharán La Navarra	22	10	12	1968	1905	+63	32	Qualification to Group B2
10	Ecoahorro Maristas	22	7	15	2027	2092	−65	29	Qualification to Group B2
11	Colecor Córdoba	22	7	15	2099	2172	−73	29	Qualification to Group B2
12	Coalsa Bosco	22	5	17	1847	2052	−205	27	Qualification to Group B2

Source: JM Almenzar Website

== Second Round ==
- The results of the first phase are maintained, therefore 12 matches are played in total.

=== Group B1 ===
Pos	Team	Pld	W	L	PF	PA	PD	Pts	Qualification or relegation
1	Caja de Ronda	22	14	8	2018	1901	+117	36	Promoted to ACB
2	Bancobao Villalba	22	14	8	1973	1981	−8	36	Promoted to ACB
3	Coronas Las Palmas	22	12	10	2037	1947	+90	34	
4	CD Cajamadrid	22	12	10	2076	2011	+65	34	
5	CB Tizona	22	12	10	1957	1909	+48	34	
6	Obradoiro Feiraco	22	12	10	2024	2024	0	34	
7	Choleck Llíria	22	11	11	1961	1962	−1	33	
8	Elosúa León	22	11	11	1911	1941	−30	33	
9	Ordenadores ADP Mataró	22	11	11	2046	2079	−33	33	
10	Metro Santa Coloma	22	9	13	1930	1986	−56	31	
11	CB Guadalajara	22	8	14	1948	2021	−73	30	
12	Valvi Girona	22	6	16	1836	1955	−119	28	

Source: JM Almenzar Website

=== Group B2 ===
Pos	Team	Pld	W	L	PF	PA	PD	Pts
1	Tenerife AB	22	15	7	1976	1885	+91	37
2	Lagisa Gijón	22	14	8	2019	1958	+61	36
3	Pacharán La Navarra	22	12	10	1977	1934	+43	34
4	CB Badajoz	22	12	10	1925	1918	+7	34
5	Caixa Ourense	22	10	12	1967	1957	+10	32
6	Ecoahorro Maristas	22	10	12	2074	2067	+7	32
7	Pamesa Valencia	22	10	12	1941	1937	+4	32
8	Júver Murcia	22	10	12	2071	2088	−17	32
9	Coalsa Bosco	22	10	12	1940	1999	−59	32
10	BC Andorra	22	10	12	1969	2030	−61	32
11	Tradehi Oviedo	22	10	12	1973	2043	−70	32
12	Colecor Córdoba	22	9	13	2110	2126	−16	31

Source: JM Almenzar Website

== Final standings ==
Pos	Team	Pld	W	L	Qualification or relegation
1	Caja de Ronda (P)	34	24	10	Promoted to ACB
2	Bancobao Villalba (P)	34	21	13	Promoted to ACB
3	Coronas Las Palmas	34	22	12	
4	CD Cajamadrid	34	24	10	
5	CB Tizona	34	21	13	
6	Obradoiro Feiraco	34	20	14	
7	Choleck Llíria	34	18	16	
8	Elosúa León	34	19	15	
9	Ordenadores ADP Mataró	34	19	15	
10	Metro Santa Coloma	34	17	17	
11	CB Guadalajara	34	16	18	
12	Valvi Girona	34	16	18	
13	Tenerife AB	34	17	17	
14	Lagisa Gijón	34	18	16	
15	Pacharán La Navarra	34	17	17	
16	CB Badajoz	34	16	18	
17	Caixa Ourense	34	16	18	
18	Ecoahorro Maristas	34	12	22	
19	Pamesa Valencia	34	14	20	
20	Júver Murcia	34	14	20	
21	Coalsa Bosco	34	12	22	
22	BC Andorra	34	12	22	
23	Tradehi Oviedo	34	11	23	
24	Colecor Córdoba	34	11	23	

Source: hispaligas.net
(P) Promoted
