= UCAM Murcia CB =

UCAM Murcia
- Nickname: Universitarios
- Leagues: Liga ACB; Champions League
- Founded: 1985
- History: Agrupacion Deportiva Juver (1985–1993); CB Murcia (1993–2013); UCAM Murcia CB (2013–present)
- Arena: Palacio de Deportes
- Capacity: 7,454
- Location: Murcia, Spain
- Team colors: Blue, gold, red
- President: María Dolores García Mascarell
- Head coach: Sito Alonso
- Ownership: UCAM
- Championships: 4 2nd division championship 1 Copa Príncipe de Asturias
- Website: ucamdeportes.com
Home	Away	Third

UCAM Murcia Club Baloncesto, S.A.D., more commonly referred to as UCAM Murcia, is a professional basketball club based in Murcia, Spain. The team plays in the Liga ACB and the FIBA Europe Cup. Their home venue is Palacio de Deportes. The team is owned and sponsored by the Spanish university Universidad Católica de Murcia (UCAM).

== History ==
Founded in 1985 under the name Agrupación Deportiva Júver Murcia, the owners agreed with a Madrid-based club, Logos de Madrid, to buy out its rights to play in the Spanish second division. Murcia would play at that level for four consecutive seasons and its first superstar was do-it-all big man Randy Owens.

In 1990, Murcia, led by veteran center Mike Phillips, beat Obradoiro in a playoffs series to gain promotion to the Spanish League. The club would stay in the Spanish elite for the next seven seasons, with stars likes Ralph McPherson, Clarence Kea, Michael Anderson and Johnny Rogers and head coaches like Felipe Coello, José María Oleart and Moncho Monsalve. In December 1991, Kea pulled down 29 rebounds, which remains a Spanish League record, in a win against Breogán Lugo.

The club became CB Murcia in 1993 and moved to its current arena, Palacio de Deportes, the following season. Murcia organized the Copa del Rey tournament in the 1995–96 season and made it to the semifinals. Murcia went down to the Spanish second division at the end of the 1996–97 season, but reached the Spanish elite a couple of times, including in 2006, when it downed CAI Zaragoza in overtime in a do-or-die game to advance. Led by Jimmie Hunter and Juanjo Triguero, Murcia ranked 12th in the 2007–08 season, but went back to the second division two years later. Murcia bounced back to score promotion directly with a 30–4 record, and has been in the Spanish elite even since.

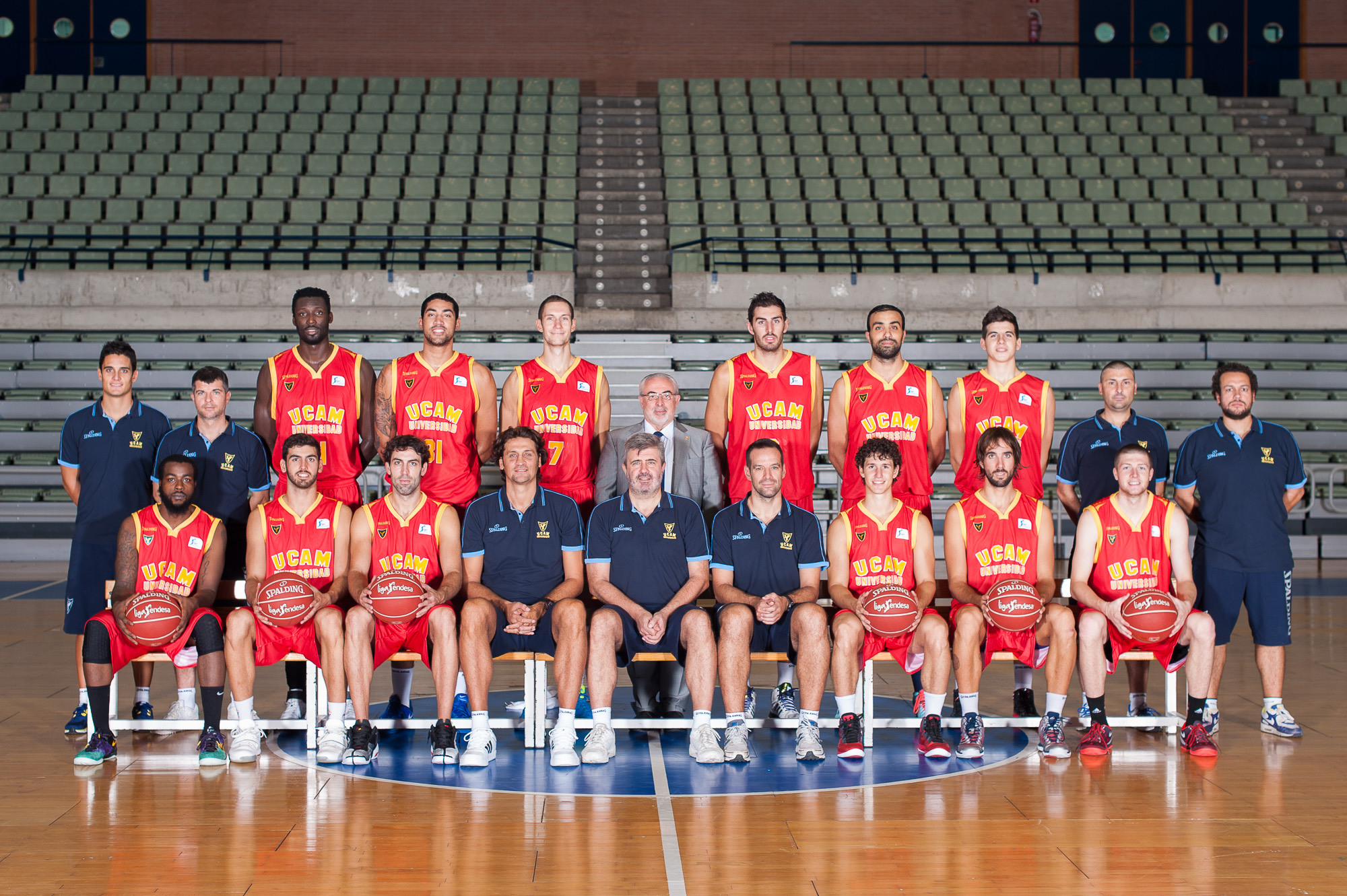
The 2013–14 roster

In 2013, the club switched hands and UCAM Murcia took control. That moved helped Murcia to reach its best results ever in the upcoming couple of seasons. With Diego Ocampo as head coach and Scott Bamforth, Raulzinho Neto and Carlos Cabezas as its top newcomers, Murcia finished the Spanish regular season with a 17–17 record, which was just one win from the playoffs. Last season Murcia found a new coach in Fotios Katsikaris and added more experienced players like Facundo Campazzo, Serhiy Lishchuk and Vítor Faverani. That led to a seventh-place finish with an 18–16 record and a ticket to the quarterfinals for the first time in the club's history, where it lost 2–1 to Real Madrid in the quarterfinals, but earned the right to make its debut in European competitions in the 2016–17 EuroCup. In its European debut, UCAM Murcia reached the Top 16 round.

In the next season, the club joined the Basketball Champions League, reaching the Final Four in its first participation. Murcia lost to AEK in the semifinals and won the third place game over MHP Riesen Ludwigsburg.

In the 2023–24 ACB season Murcia reached the finals in the first time after beating Valencia Basket in the quarterfinals and Unicaja in the semifinals, but they lost to Real Madrid in three games in 2024 ACB Finals.

== Sponsorship naming ==
CB Murcia has received diverse sponsorship names along the years:

- Júver Murcia: 1985–1992
- CB Murcia Artel: 1997–1998
- Recreativos Orenes CB Murcia: 1998–1999
- CB Etosa/Etosa Murcia: 2000–2003
- Polaris World CB Murcia: 2003–2008
- UCAM Murcia: 2011–present

== Logos ==
CB Murcia logos

1993–2009

2009–2013

2013–present

== Home arenas ==
- Pabellón Príncipe de Asturias: (1985–94)
- Palacio de Deportes: (1994–present)

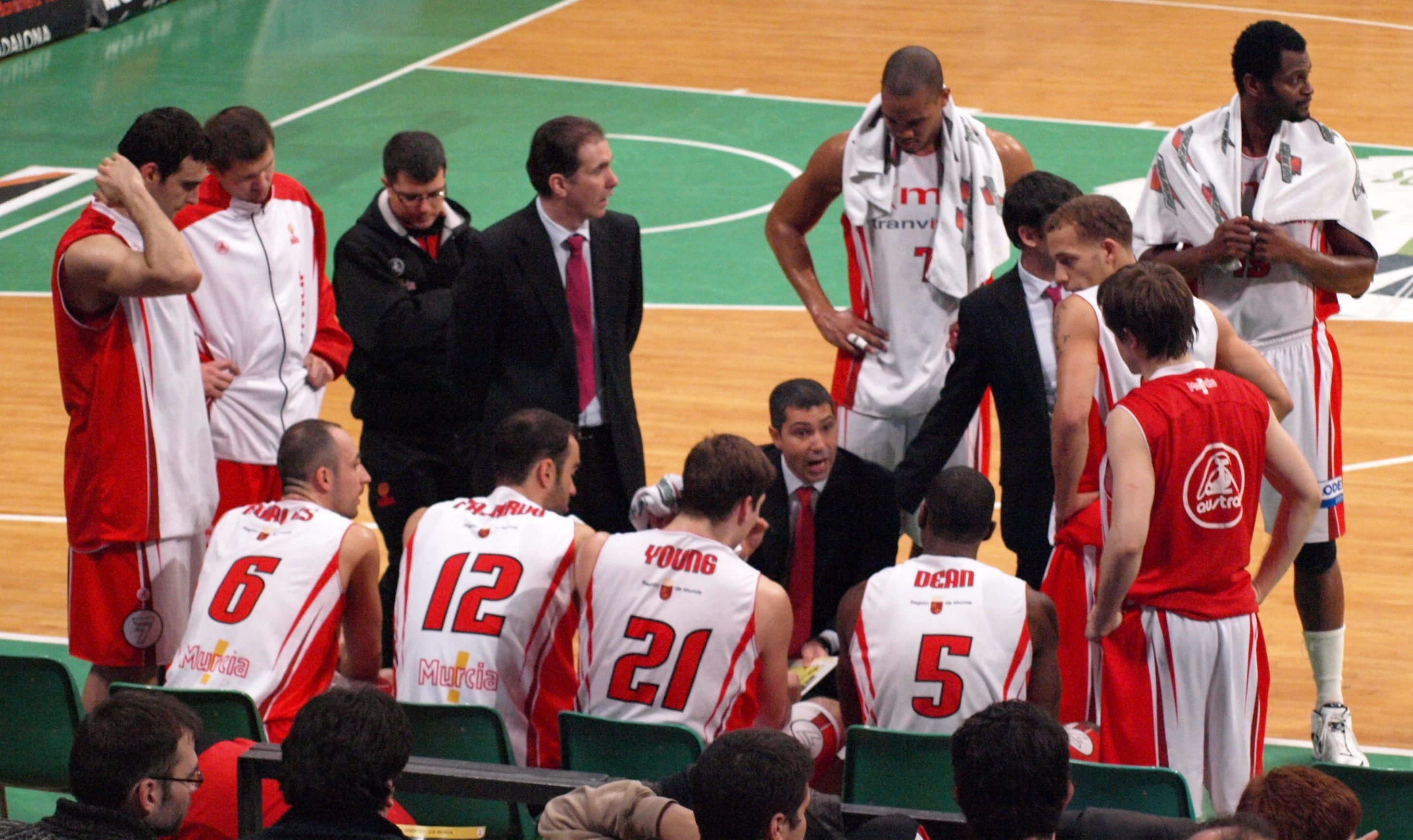
A timeout in the 2008–09 season, as seen from the stands of the Palacio de Deportes

== Players ==
=== Current roster ===
Note: Flags indicate national team eligibility at FIBA-sanctioned events. Players may hold other non-FIBA nationalities not displayed.

UCAM Murcia roster
Players
Coaches

Pos.	No.	Nat.	Name	Ht.	Age
G	0	(Guinea)	Boum, Souley	1.91 m (6 ft 3 in)	27 – 26 January 1999
PG	1	(United States)	Forrest, Michael	1.83 m (6 ft 0 in)	26 – 2 December 1999
SF	2	(Estonia)	Raieste, Sander	2.01 m (6 ft 7 in)	27 – 31 March 1999
PF	4	(United States)	Gates, Kaiser	2.01 m (6 ft 7 in)	30 – 8 November 1996
PG	6	(Argentina)	Marcos, Juani	1.90 m (6 ft 3 in)	26 – 6 July 2000
SF	8	(Cuba)	Sant-Roos, Howard	2.01 m (6 ft 7 in)	35 – 13 February 1991
SG	12	(Montenegro)	Radebaugh, Jonah (C)	1.91 m (6 ft 3 in)	29 – 17 June 1997
F	13	(Sweden)	Falk, Wilhelm	2.03 m (6 ft 8 in)	23 – 25 June 2003
SF	14	(Brazil)	Neves, Joao (Y)	1.94 m (6 ft 4 in)	18 – 2 August 2008
C	15	(Romania)	Cățe, Emanuel	2.07 m (6 ft 9 in)	29 – 30 July 1997
PF	16	(Spain)	López de la Torre, Rubén	2.01 m (6 ft 7 in)	24 – 13 March 2002
C	20	(France)	Pansa, Jean-Marc	2.08 m (6 ft 10 in)	29 – 20 August 1997
C	21	(Senegal)	Diagne, Moussa	2.11 m (6 ft 11 in)	32 – 6 March 1994
PF	28	(Latvia)	Šteinbergs, Mārcis	2.08 m (6 ft 10 in)	25 – 28 August 2001
SG	31	(Jamaica)	Ennis, Dylan (injured)	1.88 m (6 ft 2 in)	34 – 26 December 1991
PF	99	(Croatia)	Nakić, Toni	2.01 m (6 ft 7 in)	27 – 1 June 1999

Head coach

- (Spanish Basketball Federation) Sito Alonso

Assistant coach(es)

- (Spanish Basketball Federation) Lucas Pérez
- (Hellenic Basketball Federation) Dimitris Tsesmetzis

Legend

- (C) Team captain
- (Y) Youth player
- Injured

- Roster
- Transactions
Updated: September 2, 2026

=== Depth chart ===
Pos.	Starting 5	Bench 1	Bench 2	Bench 3
C	Jean-Marc Pansa	Emanuel Cățe †	Moussa Diagne †
PF	Kaiser Gates *	Toni Nakić	Mārcis Šteinbergs	Rubén López De la Torre †
SF	Howard Sant-Roos	Sander Raieste †	Wilhelm Falk †	Joao Neves ‡
SG	Jonah Radebaugh	Dylan Ennis	Souley Boum
PG	Juani Marcos	Michael Forrest

Notes: Blue † – homegrown player; (Note: A homegrown player is a player that played for at least three years before the age of 20 on a Spanish team. In Liga ACB, the team must register at least four homegrown players in rosters of 10–12 players or at least three homegrown players in rosters of 8–9 players. In Champions League, the team must register at least five homegrown players in rosters of 11–12 players or at least four homegrown players in rosters of 10 players.) Red * – overseas player; (Note: An overseas player is a player from outside EEA, FIBA Europe or ACP states. In Liga ACB, the team may register at most two overseas players. In Champions League, the team did not have any limitations regarding the number of overseas players.) Green ‡ – youth player (Note: In Liga ACB, the team may register under-22 players linked to the youth system.)

== Head coaches ==
- Felipe Coello: 1985–1991, 1991–1992, 1992, 1998, 2002–2004
- Ary Ventura Vidal: 1988–1989
- Moncho Monsalve: 1991, 1993
- Clifford Luyk: 1991
- Fernando Sánchez Luengo: 1991
- Iñaki Iriarte: 1992
- José María Oleart: 1993–1996, 2002
- Ricardo Hevia: 1996
- Alberto Sanz: 1996–1997
- Manolo Flores: 1998–2000
- Pepe Rodríguez: 2000–2002
- Miguel Ángel Martín: 2004
- Iván Déniz: 2004–2005
- Chete Pazo: 2005
- Manel Comas: 2005–2006
- Manolo Hussein: 2006–2009
- Moncho Fernández: 2009
- Edu Torres: 2009–2010
- Luis Guil: 2010–2012
- Óscar Quintana: 2012–2014, 2016–2017
- Marcelo Nicola: 2014
- Diego Ocampo: 2014–2015
- Fotios Katsikaris: 2015–2016, 2017
- Ibon Navarro: 2017–2018
- Javier Juárez: 2018–2019
- Sito Alonso: 2019–present

== Season by season ==
Season	Tier	Division	Pos.	W–L	Copa del Rey	Other cups		European competitions		
1986–87	2	1ª División B	20th	14–20						
1987–88	2	1ª División B	14th	24–18						
1988–89	2	1ª División	6th	20–13						
1989–90	2	1ª División B	1st	27–8						
1990–91	1	Liga ACB	17th	18–19	First round					
1991–92	1	Liga ACB	12th	16–20	Third round					
1992–93	1	Liga ACB	22nd (Note: Remained in the league due to the dissolution of BFI Granollers.)	8–27	First round					
1993–94	1	Liga ACB	18th	11–22	First round					
1994–95	1	Liga ACB	12th	18–20						
1995–96	1	Liga ACB	15th	15–23	Fourth position					
1996–97	1	Liga ACB	17th	6–32						
1997–98	2	LEB	1st	26–6		Copa Príncipe	SF			
1998–99	1	Liga ACB	18th	4–30						
1999–00	2	LEB	7th	20–19						
2000–01	2	LEB	9th	15–15						
2001–02	2	LEB	8th	15–19						
2002–03	2	LEB	1st	27–13						
2003–04	1	Liga ACB	18th	7–27						
2004–05	2	LEB	5th	21–17						
2005–06	2	LEB	2nd	28–15		Copa Príncipe	C			
2006–07	1	Liga ACB	14th	13–21						
2007–08	1	Liga ACB	12th	13–21						
2008–09	1	Liga ACB	15th	9–23						
2009–10	1	Liga ACB	18th	5–29						
2010–11	2	LEB Oro	1st	30–4		Copa Príncipe	RU			
2011–12	1	Liga ACB	15th	13–21						
2012–13	1	Liga ACB	13th	13–21						
2013–14	1	Liga ACB	13th	12–22						
2014–15	1	Liga ACB	10th	17–17						
2015–16	1	Liga ACB	7th	19–18						
2016–17	1	Liga ACB	9th	14–18				2 EuroCup	T16	5–9
2017–18	1	Liga ACB	10th	17–17				3 Champions League	3rd	11–9
2018–19	1	Liga ACB	14th	12–22				3 Champions League	R16	15–3
2019–20	1	Liga ACB	16th (Note: League ended prematurely due to the coronavirus pandemic.)	7–15						
2020–21	1	Liga ACB	12th	16–20						
2021–22	1	Liga ACB	10th	16–18	Semifinalist					
2022–23	1	Liga ACB	9th	16–18				3 Champions League	QF	10–6
2023–24	1	Liga ACB	2nd	26–19	Quarterfinalist	Supercopa	SF	3 Champions League	3rd	12–4
2024–25	1	Liga ACB	9th	17–17		Supercopa	SF	3 Champions League	R16	8–4
2025–26	1	Liga ACB	7th	26–11	Quarterfinalist			3 Champions League	QR	2–1
2025–26	1	Liga ACB	7th	26–11	Quarterfinalist			4 Europe Cup	SF	14–2

== Trophies and awards ==
=== Domestic competitions ===
- Liga ACB
  - Runners-up (1): 2023–24
- 2nd division championships: (4)
  - 1ª División B: (1) 1990
  - LEB Oro: (3) 1998, 2003, 2011
- Copa Príncipe de Asturias: (1)
  - 2006

=== European competitions ===
- Basketball Champions League
  - Third place (2): 2017–18, 2023–24

=== Other competitions ===
- Yecla, Spain Invitational Game: (1)
  - 2014

=== Individual awards ===
ACB Three Point Shootout Champion

- Pedro Robles – 2009

All-ACB Second Team

- Facundo Campazzo – 2017

LEB Oro MVP

- Tony Smith – 1998

All LEB Oro First Team

- Pedro Rivero – 2011

== Notable players ==
Note: Flags indicate national team eligibility at FIBA-sanctioned events. Players may hold other non-FIBA nationalities not displayed.

Criteria

To appear in this section a player must have either:

- Set a club record or won an individual award while at the club
- Played at least one official international match for their national team at any time
- Played at least one official NBA match at any time.

Spain

- (Spain) José Ángel Antelo
- (Spain) Tomás Bellas
- (Spain) Carlos Cabezas
- (Spain) Berni Rodríguez
- (Spain) Rodrigo San Miguel

Europe

- (Croatia) Vladan Alanović
- (Croatia) Bojan Bogdanović
- (Finland) Gerald Lee
- (France) Stéphane Risacher
- (France) Kim Tillie
- (United Kingdom) Ovie Soko
- (Greece) Kostas Antetokounmpo
- (Greece) Giannoulis Larentzakis
- (Greece) Dušan Šakota
- (Greece) Kostas Vasileiadis
- (Latvia) Rodions Kurucs
- (Lithuania) Donatas Slanina
- (Lithuania) Tomas Delininkaitis
- (Lithuania) Martynas Pocius
- (Montenegro) Nemanja Radović
- (Montenegro) Vlado Šćepanović
- (Montenegro) Blagota Sekulić
- (Poland) Thomas Kelati
- (Serbia) Miloš Vujanić
- (Slovakia) Anton Gavel
- (Slovenia) Goran Dragić
- (Ukraine) Serhiy Lishchuk

USA

- (United States) James Anderson
- (United States) Michael Anderson
- (United States) James Augustine
- (United States) Billy Baron
- (United States) Askia Booker
- (United States) Devontae Cacok
- (United States) Chris Chiozza
- (United States) Marty Conlon
- (United States) Corey Crowder
- (United States) David DeJulius
- (United States) Quincy Douby
- (United States) Jarrell Eddie
- (United States) Marcus Fizer
- (United States) Curtis Jerrells
- (United States) Clarence Kea
- (United States) Mark McNamara
- (United States) Pete Mickeal
- (United States) Matt Nover
- (United States) Randy Owens
- (United States) Mike Phillips
- (United States) Brian Quinnett
- (United States) Joe Ragland
- (United States) Lou Roe
- (United States) Johnny Rogers
- (United States) Dustin Sleva
- (United States) Isaiah Taylor
- (United States) Travis Trice
- (United States) Andre Turner
- (United States) Duane Washington
- (United States) James Webb III
- (United States) Mike Williams (basketball)
- (United States) Shammond Williams
- (United States) David Wood (basketball)
- (United States) Howard Wright (basketball)

Rest of Americas

- (Argentina) Facundo Campazzo
- (Argentina) Federico Kammerichs
- (Argentina) Esteban Pérez
- (Argentina) Federico Van Lacke
- (Brazil) Vítor Benite
- (Brazil) Vítor Faverani
- (Brazil) Augusto Lima
- (Brazil) Rafa Luz
- (Brazil) Raulzinho Neto
- (Brazil) Paulão Prestes
- (Canada) Tony Simms
- (Canada) Dylan Ennis
- (Cuba) Howard Sant-Roos

Africa

- (Angola) Yanick Moreira
- (Nigeria) Ime Udoka

Oceania

- (Australia) David Barlow
- (Australia) Mark Bradtke
