= CB Sant Josep =

Basketball team from Spain

Sant Josep
- Leagues: Liga EBA
- Founded: 1962
- Dissolved: 2013
- History: CB Sant Josep (1962–1989); CB Girona (1989–2008); CB Sant Josep (2008–2013)
- Arena: Palau Girona-Fontajau
- Capacity: 5,049
- Location: Girona, Catalonia, Spain
- Team colors: White and Red
- President: Francesc Ferroni
- Championships: 1 FIBA EuroCup; 2 Catalan Leagues
- Website: www.cbsantjosepgirona.com
Home	Away

Club Bàsquet Sant Josep was a professional basketball team based in Girona, Catalonia, Spain.

== History ==
The club was founded in 1962 by Ramon Sitjà as CB Sant Josep. In 1989 it became the Anonymous Sport Association (SAD). In 1987, when the ACB was enlarged to 24 teams, CB Girona entered the first division. In 1991, the club had to buy the rights of the Granollers EB to stay in the ACB as they were going to be relegated to the second division.

In 2007, Girona won the FIBA EuroCup championship, which was hosted at Palau Girona-Fontajau arena. They beat Azovmash Mariupol in the final after having beaten Adecco Estudiantes in the semifinals.

After the end of the 2007–2008 season, CB Girona suffered serious economic problems, with a debt of over €6 million euros. On July 25, 2008, the club announced that it would not participate in the 2008–09 season of either the Spanish ACB League or the Eurocup.

The SAD was dissolved original CB Sant Josep Girona was kept for beginning playing in Adecco Bronce, the fourth level Spanish division.

In the 2009–10 season, Sant Josep bought a LEB Oro place from CB Vic and played the quarterfinals of the promotion playoffs. On the next season, Girona finished in fourth position, arriving to the semifinals. In summer 2012, after three seasons spent at LEB Oro, the club resigned to its spot in the league and decided to continue playing in Liga EBA, Spanish fourth division.

In April 2013, CB Sant Josep announced it would be dissolved at the end of the 2012–13 season.

== Logos ==
Former logo, until 2009

Last ACB logo, sponsored by Akasvayu

New logo since 2009

== Season by season ==
Season	Tier	Division	Pos.	W–L	Copa del Rey	European competitions		
1983–84	3	2ª División	1st					
1984–85	3	2ª División	10th					
1985–86	3	2ª División	5th					
1986–87	2	1ª División B	12th	16–18				
1987–88	2	1ª División B	7th	28–16				
1988–89	1	Liga ACB	23rd (Note: Remained in ACB after the merge between Cacaolat Granollers and Grupo IFA.)	17–27	Round of 16			
1989–90	1	Liga ACB	18th	18–21	Quarterfinalist	3 Korać Cup	R2	3–1
1990–91	1	Liga ACB	9th	20–20				
1991–92	1	Liga ACB	13th	19–22	Quarterfinalist			
1992–93	1	Liga ACB	16th	12–21	First round			
1993–94	1	Liga ACB	17th	12–20	Second round			
1994–95	1	Liga ACB	17th	18–25				
1995–96	1	Liga ACB	11th	19–19				
1996–97	1	Liga ACB	14th	14–20				
1997–98	1	Liga ACB	12th	14–20				
1998–99	1	Liga ACB	8th	18–19				
1999–00	1	Liga ACB	10th	16–18		3 Korać Cup	SF	11–1–2
2000–01	1	Liga ACB	9th	15–19		3 Korać Cup	R2	0–2
2001–02	1	Liga ACB	11th	17–17				
2002–03	1	Liga ACB	15th	12–22				
2003–04	1	Liga ACB	13th	15–19				
2004–05	1	Liga ACB	16th	11–23				
2005–06	1	Liga ACB	7th	19–19	Quarterfinalist			
2006–07	1	Liga ACB	5th	22–16	Quarterfinalist	3 FIBA EuroCup	C	16–1
2007–08	1	Liga ACB	8th (Note: CB Girona SAD was dissolved, and original club CB Sant Josep was invited to play at LEB Bronce.)	22–15	Quarterfinalist	2 ULEB Cup	RU	12–5
2008–09	4	LEB Bronce	12th (Note: Bought the LEB Oro spot to CB Vic.)	13–17				
2009–10	2	LEB Oro	9th	19–20				
2010–11	2	LEB Oro	4th	23–19				
2011–12	2	LEB Oro	12th (Note: Resigned to its berth at LEB Oro.)	16–18				
2012–13	4	Liga EBA	10th	15–15				

== Participations in European competitions ==
- 1989-90 Korać Cup: Eliminated in the second round
- 1999-00 Korać Cup: Eliminated in the semifinals
- 2000-01 Korać Cup: Eliminated in the second round
- 2006-07 FIBA EuroCup: CHAMPIONS
- 2007-08 ULEB Cup: runners up

== Trophies and awards ==
=== Trophies ===
- FIBA EuroCup: (1)
  - 2007
- Catalan League: (2)
  - 1996, 2006
- LEB Catalan league: (2)
  - 2009, 2010

=== Individual awards ===
ACB Most Valuable Player

- Darryl Middleton – 1992, 1993, 2000
- Marc Gasol – 2008

All-ACB Team

- Marc Gasol – 2008

All LEB Oro First Team

- Levi Rost – 2011

== Sponsors ==
- 1987–1998: Valvi Supermercats, the club was renamed Valvi Girona
- 1998–1999: No sponsor, the club was renamed Girona Gavis
- 1999–2005: Casademont, the club was renamed Casademont Girona
- 2005–2008: Akasvayu, the club was renamed Akasvayu Girona
- 2008–2010: No sponsor, the club was renamed CB Sant Josep Girona
- 2010–2012: Girona FC, the club was renamed the name of the football team
- 2012–2013: No sponsor, the club was renamed CB Sant Josep Girona

== Notable players ==
- Joaquim Costa Puig
- Jordi Pardo
- Josep Cargol
- Duško Ivanović
- Francesc Solana
- Darryl Middleton
- Terrell Myers
- Xavi Fernàndez
- Rafael Jofresa
- Marc Gasol
- Dainius Šalenga
- Gregor Fučka
- Anthony Goldwire
- Marko Marinović
- Marko Kešelj
- Branko Jorović
- Xavi Vallmajó
- (Finland) Pekka Markkanen
- (Finland) Antti Nikkilä

== Notable coaches ==
- Svetislav Pešić

== Arena ==
CB Girona plays in Palau Girona-Fontajau, which has a capacity of 5,049 spectators. The arena was inaugurated in 1993 by NBA player Moses Malone, at a match between the local team Valvi Girona and PAOK Salonica.

- Palau Girona-Fontajau

== Supporter groups ==
- Dalinians
- Engaviats
- Penya Polska

== "Girona a l'ACB" platform ==
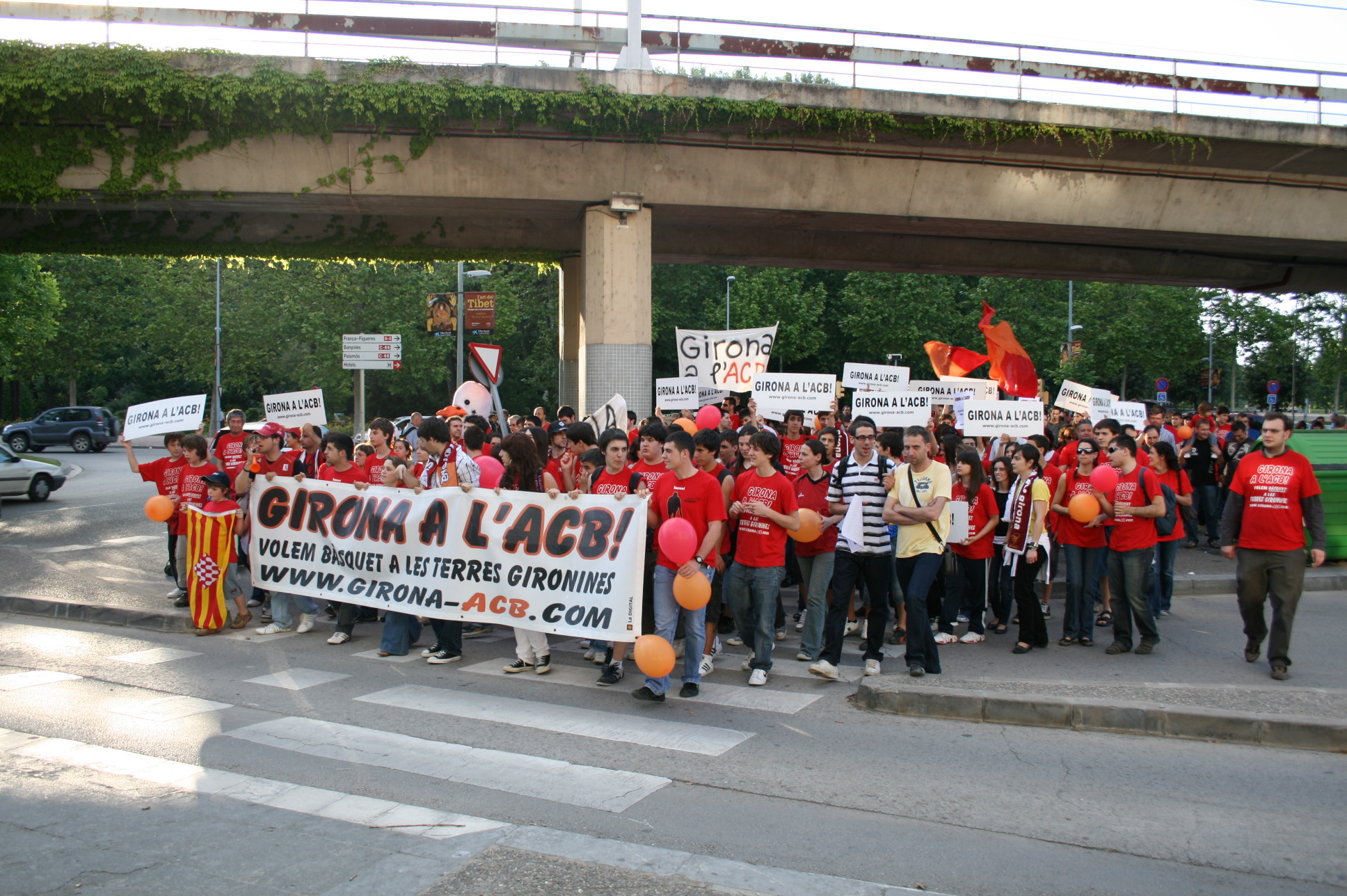
Girona a l'ACB demonstration with over 1,100 people (Girona, June 8, 2008).

"Girona a l'ACB" platform (translated from Catalan: Girona in ACB) was created on May 23, 2008, by CB Girona fans. Its purpose was to support the team and the club so they could get rid of the debt and continue playing in the top Spanish division the next year. A website was created for that (in Catalan and Spanish), and there were more than 10,500 signatures collected. Some protests were also made, like a demonstration with over 1,100 people, a basketball match in front of the city hall and a sit-down protest, amongst other actions. 300 T-shirts were also sold.
