= 2025 ACB Playoffs =

Spanish basketball postseason tournament

Tournament details
- Country: Spain
- Dates: 2–25 June 2025
- Teams: 8
- Defending champions: Real Madrid

Final positions
- Champions: Real Madrid; 16th ACB title 38th Spanish title
- Runners-up: Valencia Basket
- Semifinalists: La Laguna Tenerife; Unicaja

Tournament statistics
- Matches played: 19
- Attendance: 163,417 (8,601 per match)

The 2025 ACB Playoffs, also known as 2025 Liga Endesa Playoffs for sponsorship reasons, was the postseason tournament of the ACB's 2024–25 season, which began on 28 September 2024. The playoffs started on June 2 and ended on June 25.

Real Madrid successfully defended the title by winning a record-extending 38th title (16th in the ACB era) after sweeping Valencia Basket in the finals series.

== Format ==
At the end of the regular season, the eight teams with the most wins qualify for the playoffs. The seedings are based on each team's record.

The bracket is fixed; there is no reseeding. The quarterfinals are best-of-three series; the team that wins two games advances to the next round. This round is in a 1–1–1 format. From the semifinals onward, the rounds are best-of-five series; the team that wins three games advances to the next round. These rounds, including the Finals, are in a 2–2–1 format. Home court advantage in any round belong to the higher-seeded team.

== Playoff qualifying ==
On April 6, 2025, Real Madrid became the first team to clinch a playoff spot.

Seed	Team	Record	Clinched		
Seed	Team	Record	Playoff berth	Seeded team	Top seed
1	Real Madrid	30–4	April 6	April 20	May 11
2	Valencia Basket	25–9	April 20	May 17	–
3	La Laguna Tenerife	25–9	April 13	May 4	–
4	Unicaja	23–11	May 3	May 18	–
5	Barça	21–13	May 18	–	–
6	Joventut Badalona	20–14	May 24	–	–
7	Dreamland Gran Canaria	19–15	May 24	–	–
8	Baskonia	19–15	May 24	–	–

== Bracket ==
Teams in bold advanced to the next round. The numbers to the left of each team indicate the team's seeding, the numbers to the right indicate the result of games including result in bold of the team that won in that game, and the numbers furthest to the right indicate the number of games the team won in that round.

Quarterfinals
**1**	**Real Madrid**	**82**	**112**	**2**
8	Baskonia	76	103	0
**4**	**Unicaja**	97	**81**	**97**	**2**
5	Barça	**101**	59	95	1
**2**	**Valencia Basket**	**98**	**102**	**2**
7	Dreamland Gran Canaria	74	94	0
**3**	**La Laguna Tenerife**	**96**	**80**	**2**
6	Joventut Badalona	81	60	0

Semifinals
**1**	**Real Madrid**	**99**	**90**	84	**86**	**3**
4	Unicaja	81	75	**86**	79	1
**2**	**Valencia Basket**	**83**	**105**	**94**	**3**
3	La Laguna Tenerife	65	74	87	0

Finals
**1**	**Real Madrid**	**89**	**102**	**81**	**3**
2	Valencia Basket	75	96	70	0

Source: ACB

== Quarterfinals ==
All times are in Central European Summer Time (UTC+02:00)

=== Real Madrid v Baskonia ===
3 June 2025	**Real Madrid**	**82**–76 (Series: **1–0**)	Baskonia	Madrid
19:00	Scoring by quarter: **15**–14, 22–**24**, **22**–13, 23–**25**
	Pts: Tavares 16; Rebs: Tavares 13; Asts: Llull 6 PIR: Tavares 35	Boxscore	Pts: Howard 17; Rebs: Hall 6 Asts: Forrest 6 PIR: Howard 18	Arena: Movistar Arena; Attendance: 9,067; Referees: Carlos Peruga, Carlos Cortés, Vicente Martínez

6 June 2025	Baskonia	103–**112** (Series: **0–2**)	**Real Madrid**	Vitoria-Gasteiz
21:15	Scoring by quarter: **33**–27, 23–**27**, 25–**34**, 22–**24**
	Pts: Forrest 30; Rebs: Moneke 6 Asts: Forrest 7 PIR: Forrest 33	Boxscore	Pts: Llull 19; Rebs: Tavares, Fernando 10; Asts: Campazzo 6 PIR: Tavares 22	Arena: Buesa Arena; Attendance: 12,154; Referees: Antonio Conde, Arnau Padrós, Alberto Baena

Regular season series
Madrid won 2–0 in the regular season series

6 January 2025

Boxscore

Baskonia	82–**89**	**Real Madrid**

Buesa Arena, Vitoria-Gasteiz

16 March 2025

Boxscore

**Real Madrid**	**83**–78	Baskonia

Movistar Arena, Madrid

This was the 13th playoff meeting between these two teams, with Real Madrid winning nine of the first 12 meetings.

Previous playoff series
Madrid leads 9–3 in all-time playoff series

1988

**Real Madrid**	**2**–1	Taugrés

1988 Quarterfinals

1989

**Real Madrid**	**2**–0	Taugrés

1989 Quarterfinals

1990

**Real Madrid**	**2**–0	Taugrés

1990 Quarterfinals

1991

Real Madrid Otaysa	0–**2**	**Taugrés**

1991 Quarterfinals

1992

**Real Madrid Asegurator**	**3**–2	Taugrés

1992 Semifinals

2001

**Real Madrid**	**3**–2	TAU Cerámica

2001 Semifinals

2005

TAU Cerámica	2–**3**	**Real Madrid**

2005 Finals

2009

**TAU Cerámica**	**2**–1	Real Madrid

2009 Semifinals

2010

**Caja Laboral**	**3**–2	Real Madrid

2010 Semifinals

2012

**Real Madrid**	**3**–2	Caja Laboral

2012 Semifinals

2018

**Real Madrid**	**3**–1	Kirolbet Baskonia

2018 Finals

2022

**Real Madrid**	**3**–0	Bitci Baskonia

2022 Semifinals

=== Valencia Basket v Dreamland Gran Canaria ===
2 June 2025	**Valencia Basket**	**98**–74 (Series: **1–0**)	Dreamland Gran Canaria	Valencia
19:00	Scoring by quarter: **26**–15, 18–**26**, **34**–8, 20–**25**
	Pts: Montero 21; Rebs: de Larrea 7 Asts: Montero 4 PIR: Montero 19	Boxscore	Pts: Salvó 13; Rebs: Diop 5 Asts: Samar 6 PIR: Pelos 15	Arena: La Fonteta; Attendance: 6,668; Referees: Martín Caballero, Javier Torres, Andrés Fernández

4 June 2025	Dreamland Gran Canaria	94–**102**(OT) (Series: **0–2**)	**Valencia Basket**	Las Palmas
21:15	Scoring by quarter: **24**–16, 22–**27**, **26**–24, 18–**23**, Overtime: 4–**12**
	Pts: Homesley, Albicy 16; Rebs: Conditt 8 Asts: Albicy 6 PIR: Albicy 22	Boxscore	Pts: Montero 36; Rebs: Montero 10; Asts: Pradilla 4 PIR: Montero 41	Arena: Gran Canaria Arena; Attendance: 5,617; Referees: Jordi Aliaga, Rafael Serrano, Juan de Dios Oyón

Regular season series
Tied 1–1 in the regular season series

27 December 2024

Boxscore

**Dreamland Gran Canaria**	**97**–94	Valencia Basket

Gran Canaria Arena, Las Palmas

10 May 2025

Boxscore

**Valencia Basket**	**86**–79	Dreamland Gran Canaria

La Fonteta, Valencia

This was the second playoff meeting between these two teams, with Dreamland Gran Canaria winning the previous meeting.

Previous playoff series
Gran Canaria leads 1–0 in all-time playoff series

2018

Valencia Basket	1–**2**	**Herbalife Gran Canaria**

2018 Quarterfinals

=== La Laguna Tenerife v Joventut Badalona ===
2 June 2025	**La Laguna Tenerife**	**96**–81 (Series: **1–0**)	Joventut Badalona	San Cristóbal de La Laguna
21:15	Scoring by quarter: **22**–21, 20–20, **28**–22, **26**–18
	Pts: Huertas 39; Rebs: Shermadini 9 Asts: Huertas 6 PIR: Huertas 41	Boxscore	Pts: Dekker 18; Rebs: Tomić 7 Asts: Dotson, Ribas 3 PIR: Tomić 16	Arena: Santiago Martín; Attendance: 4,768; Referees: Fernando Calatrava, Alfonso Olivares, Iyán González

4 June 2025	Joventut Badalona	60–**80** (Series: **0–2**)	**La Laguna Tenerife**	Badalona
19:00	Scoring by quarter: 16–**22**, **21**–14, 13–**25**, 10–**19**
	Pts: Dotson 20; Rebs: Tomić 9 Asts: Hanga 3 PIR: Dotson 18	Boxscore	Pts: Fitipaldo 23; Rebs: Doornekamp 8 Asts: Fitipaldo, Sastre 4 PIR: Fitipaldo 26	Arena: Palau Municipal d'Esports; Attendance: 5,839; Referees: Benjamín Jiménez, Luis Miguel Castillo, Raúl Zamorano

Regular season series
Tied 1–1 in the regular season series

15 December 2024

Boxscore

**Joventut Badalona**	**93**–86	La Laguna Tenerife

Palau Municipal d'Esports, Badalona

1 March 2025

Boxscore

**La Laguna Tenerife**	**82**–81	Joventut Badalona

Santiago Martín, San Cristóbal de La Laguna

This was the third playoff meeting between these two teams, with Joventut Badalona winning the previous two meetings.

Previous playoff series
Joventut leads 2–0 in all-time playoff series

1987

**Ron Negrita Joventut**	**2**–0	Cajacanarias

1987 Quarterfinals

2022

**Joventut**	**2**–1	Lenovo Tenerife

2022 Quarterfinals

=== Unicaja v Barça ===
3 June 2025	Unicaja	97–**101**(OT) (Series: **0–1**)	**Barça**	Málaga
21:15	Scoring by quarter: **21**–16, **25**–21, 14–**25**, **25**–23, Overtime: 12–**16**
	Pts: Carter 13; Rebs: Pérez 7 Asts: Perry 10; PIR: Pérez 16	Boxscore	Pts: Punter 21; Rebs: Hernangómez, Parra 7 Asts: Punter 5 PIR: Punter 28	Arena: Martín Carpena; Attendance: 10,554; Referees: Juan Carlos García González, Francisco Araña, Jorge Martínez

6 June 2025	Barça	59–**81** (Series: **1–1**)	**Unicaja**	Barcelona
19:00	Scoring by quarter: 17–**26**, 18–18, 13–**21**, 11–**16**
	Pts: Punter 12; Rebs: Satoranský 7 Asts: Satoranský 6 PIR: Satoranský 13	Boxscore	Pts: Perry 15; Rebs: Ejim 7 Asts: Díaz 6 PIR: Balcerowski 20	Arena: Palau Blaugrana; Attendance: 6,892; Referees: Emilio Pérez Pizarro, Óscar Perea, Alberto Sánchez Sixto

8 June 2025	**Unicaja**	**97**–95(OT) (Series: **2–1**)	Barça	Málaga
18:30	Scoring by quarter: **24**–18, 19–**24**, 12–**22**, **29**–20, Overtime: **13**–11
	Pts: Perry, Taylor 16; Rebs: Pérez 7 Asts: Perry 5 PIR: Taylor 20	Boxscore	Pts: Punter 37; Rebs: Parra 7 Asts: Satoranský 6 PIR: Punter 36	Arena: Martín Carpena; Attendance: 10,681; Referees: Antonio Conde, Jordi Aliaga, Martín Caballero

Regular season series
Tied 1–1 in the regular season series

27 October 2024

Boxscore

**Unicaja**	**103**–96	Barça

Martín Carpena, Málaga

27 April 2025

Boxscore

**Barça**	**83**–81	Unicaja

Palau Blaugrana, Barcelona

This was the 11th playoff meeting between these two teams, with Barça winning the previous 10 meetings.

Previous playoff series
Barça leads 10–0 in all-time playoff series

1995

**FC Barcelona Banca Catalana**	**3**–2	Unicaja

1995 Finals

1997

**FC Barcelona Banca Catalana**	**3**–2	Unicaja

1997 Quarterfinals

2000

**FC Barcelona**	**3**–2	Unicaja

2000 Quarterfinals

2001

**FC Barcelona**	**3**–0	Unicaja

2001 Semifinals

2004

**FC Barcelona**	**3**–0	Unicaja

2004 Semifinals

2009

**Regal FC Barcelona**	**2**–1	Unicaja

2009 Semifinals

2010

**Regal FC Barcelona**	**3**–0	Unicaja

2010 Semifinals

2011

**Regal FC Barcelona**	**2**–0	Unicaja

2011 Quarterfinals

2015

**FC Barcelona Lassa**	**3**–2	Unicaja

2015 Semifinals

2023

**Barça**	**3**–1	Unicaja

2023 Semifinals

== Semifinals ==
All times are in Central European Summer Time (UTC+02:00)

=== Real Madrid v Unicaja ===
11 June 2025	**Real Madrid**	**99**–81 (Series: **1–0**)	Unicaja	Madrid
21:15	Scoring by quarter: **29**–14, **22**–17, **24**–22, 24–**28**
	Pts: Musa 23; Rebs: Feliz 6 Asts: Campazzo 7 PIR: Musa 27	Boxscore	Pts: Ejim 13; Rebs: Carter, Pérez 5 Asts: Díaz 6 PIR: Ejim 15	Arena: Movistar Arena; Attendance: 10,089; Referees: Emilio Pérez Pizarro, Óscar Perea, Francisco Araña

13 June 2025	**Real Madrid**	**90**–75 (Series: **2–0**)	Unicaja	Madrid
21:15	Scoring by quarter: **23**–19, **23**–22, **21**–17, **23**–17
	Pts: Campazzo, Hezonja 18; Rebs: Hezonja 6 Asts: Campazzo 4 PIR: Llull, Campazzo 19	Boxscore	Pts: Perry 16; Rebs: Pérez, Barreiro 6 Asts: three players 3 PIR: Pérez 18	Arena: Movistar Arena; Attendance: 10,174; Referees: Antonio Conde, Fernando Calatrava, Martín Caballero

15 June 2025	**Unicaja**	**86**–84 (Series: **1–2**)	Real Madrid	Málaga
17:00	Scoring by quarter: **23**–13, **25**–21, 22–**26**, 16–**24**
	Pts: Osetkowski 21; Rebs: Osetkowski 6 Asts: Díaz 6 PIR: Osetkowski 17	Boxscore	Pts: Hezonja 18; Rebs: Tavares 7 Asts: Feliz 5 PIR: Hezonja 20	Arena: Martín Carpena; Attendance: 10,681; Referees: Carlos Peruga, Carlos Cortés, Alfonso Olivares

17 June 2025	Unicaja	79–**86** (Series: **1–3**)	**Real Madrid**	Málaga
21:15	Scoring by quarter: **22**–16, 21–**23**, 20–**22**, 16–**25**
	Pts: Carter 17; Rebs: Osetkowski, Taylor 5 Asts: Díaz 4 PIR: Ejim 14	Boxscore	Pts: Hezonja 20; Rebs: Tavares 12; Asts: Campazzo 6 PIR: Campazzo, Tavares 24	Arena: Martín Carpena; Attendance: 10,681; Referees: Emilio Pérez Pizarro, Óscar Perea, Jordi Aliaga

Regular season series
Madrid won 2–0 in the regular season series

8 December 2024

Boxscore

**Real Madrid**	**90**–77	Unicaja

WiZink Center, Madrid

23 March 2025

Boxscore

Unicaja	105–**107**	**Real Madrid**

Martín Carpena, Málaga

This was the fifth playoff meeting between these two teams, with Real Madrid winning three of the first four meetings.

Previous playoff series
Madrid leads 3–1 in all-time playoff series

1991

**Real Madrid Otaysa**	**2**–0	Caja Ronda

1991 First round

2008

Real Madrid	0–**2**	**Unicaja**

2008 Quarterfinals

2014

**Real Madrid**	**3**–1	Unicaja

2014 Semifinals

2017

**Real Madrid**	**3**–0	Unicaja

2017 Semifinals

=== Valencia Basket v La Laguna Tenerife ===
10 June 2025	**Valencia Basket**	**83**–65 (Series: **1–0**)	La Laguna Tenerife	Valencia
21:15	Scoring by quarter: **23**–19, **24**–18, 20–**22**, **16**–6
	Pts: Montero 16; Rebs: Pradilla 10; Asts: Badio, de Larrea 3 PIR: Pradilla 22	Boxscore	Pts: Huertas 18; Rebs: Scrubb 9 Asts: Huertas 5 PIR: Huertas 17	Arena: La Fonteta; Attendance: 7,453; Referees: Juan Carlos García González, Rafael Serrano, Alberto Sánchez Sixto

12 June 2025	**Valencia Basket**	**105**–74 (Series: **2–0**)	La Laguna Tenerife	Valencia
21:15	Scoring by quarter: **23**–10, **32**–25, 20–**22**, **30**–17
	Pts: Montero 20; Rebs: López-Arostegui 8 Asts: Pradilla, Montero 4 PIR: Montero 26	Boxscore	Pts: Fitipaldo 22; Rebs: Morin 9 Asts: Morin 6 PIR: Fitipaldo, Morin 14	Arena: La Fonteta; Attendance: 7,746; Referees: Carlos Peruga, Benjamín Jiménez, Juan de Dios Oyón

14 June 2025	La Laguna Tenerife	87–**94** (Series: **0–3**)	**Valencia Basket**	San Cristóbal de La Laguna
21:15	Scoring by quarter: **29**–20, 16–**19**, 15–**33**, **27**–22
	Pts: Huertas 17; Rebs: Abromaitis, Doornekamp 6 Asts: Huertas 8 PIR: Huertas 22	Boxscore	Pts: Badio 28; Rebs: Puerto 8 Asts: Pradilla, Jones 3 PIR: Pradilla 29	Arena: Santiago Martín; Attendance: 5,066; Referees: Jordi Aliaga, Arnau Padrós, Jorge Martínez

Regular season series
Valencia won 2–0 in the regular season series

13 December 2024

Boxscore

**Valencia Basket**	**96**–81	La Laguna Tenerife

La Fonteta, Valencia

25 May 2025

Boxscore

La Laguna Tenerife	99–**102**	**Valencia Basket**

Santiago Martín, San Cristóbal de La Laguna

This was the first playoff meeting between Valencia Basket and La Laguna Tenerife.

== Finals ==
All times are in Central European Summer Time (UTC+02:00)

20 June 2025	**Real Madrid**	**89**–75 (Series: **1–0**)	Valencia Basket	Madrid
21:15	Scoring by quarter: **19**–15, 16–**17**, **29**–28, **25**–15
	Pts: Feliz 18; Rebs: Fernando 7 Asts: Feliz 3 PIR: Feliz 22	Boxscore	Pts: Badio 20; Rebs: Pradilla 8 Asts: Jones 5 PIR: Badio 15	Arena: Movistar Arena; Attendance: 10,064; Referees: Antonio Conde, Carlos Cortés, Arnau Padrós

22 June 2025	**Real Madrid**	**102**–96(OT) (Series: **2–0**)	Valencia Basket	Madrid
18:30	Scoring by quarter: 22–**25**, **26**–20, 21–**23**, 20–**21**, Overtime: **13**–7
	Pts: Campazzo 18; Rebs: Tavares 10; Asts: Campazzo 11; PIR: Campazzo 19	Boxscore	Pts: Montero 23; Rebs: Pradilla 8 Asts: Montero 8 PIR: Montero 26	Arena: Movistar Arena; Attendance: 11,142; Referees: Emilio Pérez Pizarro, Óscar Perea, Francisco Araña

25 June 2025	Valencia Basket	70–**81** (Series: **0–3**)	**Real Madrid**	Valencia
21:15	Scoring by quarter: 19–**23**, **21**–16, 9–**21**, 21–21
	Pts: López-Arostegui 14; Rebs: Sestina 8 Asts: Jones 3 PIR: López-Arostegui 16	Boxscore	Pts: Hezonja 16; Rebs: Hezonja 9 Asts: Campazzo 8 PIR: Fernando 21	Arena: La Fonteta; Attendance: 8,081; Referees: Carlos Peruga, Jordi Aliaga, Alberto Sánchez Sixto

Regular season series
Tied 1–1 in the regular season series

22 December 2024

Boxscore

**Valencia Basket**	**85**–84	Real Madrid

La Fonteta, Valencia

4 May 2025

Boxscore

**Real Madrid**	**96**–89	Valencia Basket

Movistar Arena, Madrid

This was the eighth playoff meeting between these two teams, with Real Madrid winning six of the first seven meetings.

Previous playoff series
Madrid leads 6–1 in all-time playoff series

1998

**Real Madrid Teka**	**3**–1	Pamesa Valencia

1998 Quarterfinals

2007

**Real Madrid**	**3**–1	Pamesa Valencia

2007 Quarterfinals

2015

**Real Madrid**	**3**–1	Valencia Basket

2015 Semifinals

2016

**Real Madrid**	**3**–1	Valencia Basket

2016 Semifinals

2017

Real Madrid	1–**3**	**Valencia Basket**

2017 Finals

2019

**Real Madrid**	**3**–0	Valencia Basket

2019 Semifinals

2021

**Real Madrid**	**2**–1	Valencia Basket

2021 Semifinals
