= Derrick Alston Jr. =

American basketball player (born 1997)

- Alston Jr. with Virtus Bologna in 2026

No. 21 – Virtus Bologna
- Position: Power forward
- League: LBA; EuroLeague

Personal information
- Born: September 17, 1997 (age 29) Houston, Texas, U.S.
- Listed height: 6 ft 9 in (2.06 m)
- Listed weight: 190 lb (86 kg)

Career information
- High school: Strake Jesuit (Houston, Texas)
- College: Boise State (2017–2021)
- NBA draft: 2021: undrafted
- Playing career: 2021–present

Career history
- 2021–2022: Salt Lake City Stars
- 2022–2024: Rostock Seawolves
- 2024–2025: Manresa
- 2025–present: Virtus Bologna

Career highlights
- All-FIBA Champions League Second Team (2025); All-Liga ACB First Team (2025); 2× All-Bundesliga First Team (2023, 2024); First-team All-Mountain West (2021); Second-team All-Mountain West (2020)
- Stats at NBA.com
- Stats at Basketball Reference

Derrick Samuel Alston Jr. (born September 17, 1997) is an American professional basketball player for Virtus Bologna of the Italian Lega Basket Serie A (LBA) and the EuroLeague. He played college basketball for the Boise State Broncos.

== Early life ==
Alston worked as a ball boy for the Houston Rockets of the National Basketball Association, grabbing rebounds for players during warmups. Alston attended Strake Jesuit College Preparatory in Houston, where he played varsity basketball for two years. As a senior, he averaged 14.6 points and 5.1 rebounds per game, earning first-team All-District 19-6A honors. Alston received attention from several NCAA Division II schools but did not have any NCAA Division I offers, with some programs suggesting that he complete a postgraduate season. He was convinced to work his way to a basketball scholarship at Boise State after a junior college coach sent film of Alston to the Bronco's coaching staff.

== College career ==
Alston was invited to walk on to Boise State after impressing the team's coaching staff. When he joined Boise State, he stood 6'9" and weighed 148 pounds. Alston redshirted his first year and reached a weight of 170 pounds by the start of his next season. As a freshman, he averaged 0.6 points per game in limited playing time. He began earning more minutes during his sophomore season due to his work ethic as well as the departure of Chandler Hutchison to the NBA. On February 9, 2019, Alston scored a career-high 33 points, shooting 12-of-15 from the field, along with four rebounds and four assists in a 105–57 win over San Jose State. In his sophomore season, he averaged 13.4 points and 3.9 rebounds per game and was an All-Mountain West honorable mention selection. His increase in points per game from the previous season ranked first in school history and second in the nation. Before his junior season, he earned a scholarship to play for Boise State. On December 23, 2019, Alston scored a season-high 32 points to go with six assists in an 85–69 victory over Portland at the Diamond Head Classic. As a junior, he averaged 17.3 points, 5.2 rebounds and 3.1 assists per game, earning second-team All-Mountain West accolades. On April 7, 2020, Alston announced that he would enter the 2020 NBA draft, while maintaining his college eligibility. On July 8, Alston announced that he would be returning to Boise State for his final season.

== Professional career ==
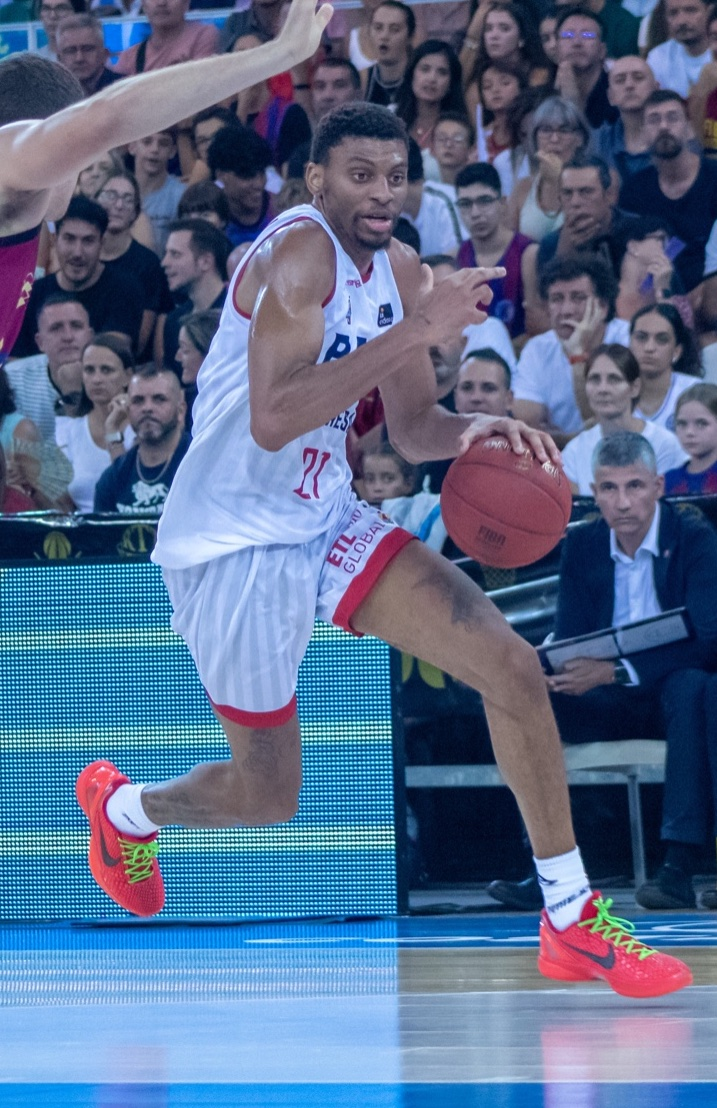
Alston with Manresa in 2024

After going undrafted in the 2021 NBA draft, Alston joined the Golden State Warriors for the 2021 NBA Summer League. On September 13, 2021, he signed with the Utah Jazz. He was waived prior to the start of the season. In October 2021, Alston joined the Salt Lake City Stars as an affiliate player.

Alston joined the Dallas Mavericks for the 2022 NBA Summer League.

On August 15, 2022, he has signed with Rostock Seawolves of the Basketball Bundesliga. On January 28, 2023, Alston's NBA G League rights were traded from the Iowa Wolves to the Long Island Nets in exchange for Craig Randall II.

Alston joined Manresa of the Liga ACB in July 2024, signing a one year deal. His father Derrick Alston played for the Catalans in the 1997–98 ACB season, in which Bàsquet Manresa won its first and only Liga ACB trophy. With Manresa, Alston won the ACB Player of the Month Award in January 2025. Alston was named to the All-Liga ACB First Team for the 2024-25 ACB season.

In June 2025, he signed with Virtus Bologna of the Italian Lega Basket Serie A (LBA) and the EuroLeague.

== Career statistics ==
Legend
GP	Games played	GS	Games started	MPG	Minutes per game
FG%	Field goal percentage	3P%	3-point field goal percentage	FT%	Free throw percentage
RPG	Rebounds per game	APG	Assists per game	SPG	Steals per game
BPG	Blocks per game	PPG	Points per game	**Bold**	Career high

=== College ===
Year	Team	GP	GS	MPG	FG%	3P%	FT%	RPG	APG	SPG	BPG	PPG
2016–17	Boise State	Redshirt										
2017–18	Boise State	11	0	2.4	.429	**.500**	.000	.5	.2	.1	.0	.6
2018–19	Boise State	**33**	21	27.9	**.485**	.384	.819	3.9	1.1	.4	**.4**	13.4
2019–20	Boise State	32	**30**	**33.0**	.413	.335	.808	**5.2**	**3.1**	.5	.3	**17.3**
2020–21	Boise State	28	28	32.5	.444	.382	**.856**	3.7	2.2	**.8**	.3	17.0
Career		104	79	28.0	.443	.365	.821	3.9	1.9	.5	.3	14.2

== Personal life ==
Alston's father, Derrick Alston, played in the National Basketball Association (NBA) for three years before playing professional basketball overseas for 16 years. Derrick Sr. later coached in the NBA and the NBA G League and currently serves as head coach for the Westchester Knicks of the G League.
