= 2012 ACB Playoffs =

The 2012 ACB Playoffs were the final phase of the 2011–12 ACB season. It started on May 17, 2012 and ended on June 16, 2012. FC Barcelona Regal retained the title, winning their 17th Spanish league.

All times are CEST (UTC+02:00).

== Bracket ==
Quarter Finals
1	FC Barcelona Regal	2
8	Lucentum Alicante	0
4	Valencia Basket	2
5	Lagun Aro GBC	1
2	Real Madrid	2
7	Banca Cívica	0
3	Caja Laboral	2
6	Gescrap Bizkaia	0

Semifinals
1	FC Barcelona Regal	3
4	Valencia Basket	1
2	Real Madrid	3
3	Caja Laboral	2

Finals
1	FC Barcelona Regal	3
2	Real Madrid	2

== Quarterfinals ==
The quarterfinals are best-of-3 series.

=== FC Barcelona Regal vs. Lucentum Alicante ===
May 17
20:45

Report

FC Barcelona Regal	73–43	Lucentum Alicante
Scoring by quarter: 21–6, 14–14, 17–14, 21–9
Pts: Huertas 14; Rebs: N'Dong 7 Asts: Huertas 6 PIR: Huertas 18		Pts: Stojić 9 Rebs: Ivanov 13; Asts: Ivanov 4 PIR: Ivanov 22
1–0

Palau Blaugrana, Barcelona
Attendance: 3,886
Referees: De la Maza, García González, Martínez Díez

May 20
12:30

Report

Lucentum Alicante	57–84	FC Barcelona Regal
Scoring by quarter: 13–24, 21–18, 15–15, 8–27
Pts: Llompart 16; Rebs: Ivanov 10; Asts: Stojić 3 PIR: Ivanov 14		Pts: N'Dong 14; Rebs: Mickeal 6 Asts: four players 2 PIR: N'Dong 19
FC Barcelona Regal wins series 2–0

Centro de Tecnificación, Alicante
Attendance: 3,960
Referees: Hierrezuelo, Jiménez, Cortés

=== Valencia Basket vs. Lagun Aro GBC ===
May 17
20:30

Report

Valencia Basket	82–60	Lagun Aro GBC
Scoring by quarter: 26–22, 18–15, 22–10, 16–13
Pts: de Colo 26; Rebs: Caner-Medley 12; Asts: Marković, de Colo 4 PIR: de Colo 29		Pts: Vidal 14; Rebs: Doblas 5 Asts: Salgado 4 PIR: Vidal 11
1–0

Fuente San Luis, Valencia
Attendance: 8,200
Referees: Redondo, Conde, Sánchez Monserrat

May 20
12:30

Report

Lagun Aro GBC	86–82 (OT)	Valencia Basket
Scoring by quarter: 19–25, 12–17, 21–20, 19–9, Overtime: 15–11
Pts: Doblas 21; Rebs: Doblas 9 Asts: Neto 5 PIR: Doblas 23		Pts: Marković 17; Rebs: Faverani 7 Asts: Marković 4 PIR: de Colo 18
1–1

Illumbe, San Sebastián
Attendance: 7,345
Referees: Pérez Pizarro, Pérez Pérez, Peruga

May 22
21:45

Report

Valencia Basket	75–67	Lagun Aro GBC
Scoring by quarter: 16–21, 23–20, 20–7, 16–19
Pts: Newley 17; Rebs: Claver 8 Asts: Martínez, San Miguel 2 PIR: Newley 16		Pts: Salgado 21; Rebs: Doblas 11; Asts: Neto 4 PIR: Doblas 24
Valencia Basket wins series 2–1

Fuente San Luis, Valencia
Attendance: 8,800
Referees: Arteaga, Perea, Jiménez

=== Real Madrid vs. Banca Cívica ===
May 18
20:45

Report

Real Madrid	82–68	Banca Cívica
Scoring by quarter: 26–16, 12–24, 20–17, 24–11
Pts: Singler 14; Rebs: Begić 7 Asts: Llull 5 PIR: Llull 18		Pts: Urtasun 19; Rebs: Davis 6 Asts: Calloway 5 PIR: Urtasun 18
1–0

Palacio de Deportes, Madrid
Attendance: 7,129
Referees: Hierrezuelo, Araña, Cortés

May 20
19:00

Report

Banca Cívica	55–82	Real Madrid
Scoring by quarter: 12–22, 19–19, 16–15, 8–26
Pts: Urtasun 16; Rebs: Davis 6 Asts: Calloway 3 PIR: Calloway 16		Pts: Carroll 20; Rebs: Reyes 8 Asts: Rodríguez, Suárez 4 PIR: Carroll 20
Real Madrid wins series 2–0

San Pablo, Seville
Attendance: 6,200
Referees: Martín Bertrán, García González, Calatrava

=== Caja Laboral vs. Gescrap Bizkaia ===
May 17
20:30

Report

Caja Laboral	77–73	Gescrap Bizkaia
Scoring by quarter: 20–22, 22–20, 13–15, 22–16
Pts: Teletović 19; Rebs: Bjelica 6 Asts: Heurtel 2 PIR: Teletović 20		Pts: Jackson 18; Rebs: Mumbrú 6 Asts: Jackson, Mumbrú 3 PIR: Vasileiadis 16
1–0

Fernando Buesa, Vitoria-Gasteiz
Attendance: 14,162
Referees: Arteaga, García Ortiz, Peruga

May 20
12:30

Report

Gescrap Bizkaia	88–90 (OT)	Caja Laboral
Scoring by quarter: 15–17, 23–18, 17–21, 26–25, Overtime: 7–9
Pts: Jackson 20; Rebs: Mumbrú 8 Asts: Hervelle 5 PIR: Jackson 25		Pts: San Emeterio 17; Rebs: three players 6 Asts: Prigioni 6 PIR: San Emeterio 24
Caja Laboral wins series 2–0

Bilbao Arena, Bilbao
Attendance: 9,430
Referees: Mitjana, Conde, Araña

== Semifinals ==
The semifinals are best-of-5 series.

=== FC Barcelona Regal vs. Valencia Basket ===
May 24
21:45

Report

FC Barcelona Regal	84–57	Valencia Basket
Scoring by quarter: 23–10, 26–22, 19–12, 16–13
Pts: Lorbek 15; Rebs: Lorbek, Mickeal 6 Asts: Lorbek, Huertas 5 PIR: Lorbek 24		Pts: Faverani 19; Rebs: Caner-Medley 8 Asts: Marković 4 PIR: Faverani 19
1–0

Palau Blaugrana, Barcelona
Attendance: 4,485
Referees: De la Maza, Conde, Peruga

May 27
12:00

Report

FC Barcelona Regal	76–81	Valencia Basket
Scoring by quarter: 21–14, 16–25, 19–17, 20–25
Pts: Huertas 17; Rebs: N'Dong 7 Asts: Huertas 8 PIR: Huertas 25		Pts: de Colo 16; Rebs: Caner-Medley 9 Asts: de Colo 5 PIR: Martínez 19
1–1

Palau Blaugrana, Barcelona
Attendance: 3,929
Referees: Pérez Pizarro, Bultó, Cortés

May 30
20:45

Report

Valencia Basket	64–80	FC Barcelona Regal
Scoring by quarter: 17–16, 13–24, 17–19, 17–21
Pts: Faverani 14; Rebs: Claver 6 Asts: Martínez 3 PIR: Martínez 12		Pts: Navarro 15; Rebs: Sada 7 Asts: Huertas 4 PIR: Huertas 17
1–2

Fuente San Luis, Valencia
Attendance: 9,000
Referees: Redondo, García González, Jiménez

June 1
20:45

Report

Valencia Basket	73–77	FC Barcelona Regal
Scoring by quarter: 18–20, 11–13, 21–18, 23–26
Pts: de Colo 22; Rebs: three players 5 Asts: de Colo, Martínez 4 PIR: de Colo 29		Pts: Navarro 17; Rebs: Wallace 9 Asts: Eidson 4 PIR: Wallace 20
FC Barcelona Regal wins series 3–1

Fuente San Luis, Valencia
Attendance: 8,400
Referees: Pérez Pizarro, García Ortiz, Peruga

=== Real Madrid vs. Caja Laboral ===
May 24
20:00

Report

Real Madrid	71–81	Caja Laboral
Scoring by quarter: 21–22, 23–19, 15–19, 12–21
Pts: Veličković 12; Rebs: Begić 8 Asts: Singler, Reyes 2 PIR: Reyes 17		Pts: Lampe 21; Rebs: Lampe 11; Asts: Prigioni 6 PIR: Lampe 24
0–1

Palacio de Deportes, Madrid
Attendance: 7,467
Referees: Juan Carlos Arteaga, Oscar Perea, Lluis Guirao

May 26
20:45

Report

Real Madrid	73–64	Caja Laboral
Scoring by quarter: 13–20, 18–11, 23–16, 19–17
Pts: Llull, Veličković 16; Rebs: Tomić 6 Asts: Llull 4 PIR: Llull 25		Pts: Bjelica, Teletović 16; Rebs: Bjelica, Lampe 7 Asts: Heurtel, Prigioni 4 PIR: Bjelica 16
1–1

Palacio de Deportes, Madrid
Attendance: 8,262
Referees: Hierrezuelo, García Ortiz, Martínez Díez

May 29
20:45

Report

Caja Laboral	82–79 (OT)	Real Madrid
Scoring by quarter: 15–13, 17–17, 22–17, 15–22, Overtime: 13–10
Pts: Oleson 17; Rebs: San Emeterio 6 Asts: Prigioni 7 PIR: Oleson 24		Pts: Rodríguez 19; Rebs: Veličković 7 Asts: Llull 5 PIR: Rodríguez 23
2–1

Fernando Buesa, Vitoria-Gasteiz
Attendance: 13,615
Referees: J.A. Martín Bertrán, M.A. Pérez Pérez, Francisco J. Araña

May 31
20:45

Report

Caja Laboral	66–76	Real Madrid
Scoring by quarter: 26–21, 12–14, 14–22, 14–19
Pts: Lampe 20; Rebs: Lampe 8 Asts: Prigioni 4 PIR: Lampe 25		Pts: Veličković 22; Rebs: Tomić 11; Asts: Rodríguez 5 PIR: Veličković 22
2–2

Fernando Buesa, Vitoria-Gasteiz
Attendance: 15,219
Referees: Arteaga, Hierrezuelo, Conde

June 2
20:30

Report

Real Madrid	76–69	Caja Laboral
Scoring by quarter: 14–24, 23–13, 16–14, 23–18
Pts: Veličković 15; Rebs: Reyes 9 Asts: Rodríguez 8 PIR: Reyes 21		Pts: Teletović 14; Rebs: Lampe 7 Asts: Prigioni 7 PIR: Lampe 14
Real Madrid wins series 3–2

Palacio de Deportes, Madrid
Attendance: 13,109
Referees: Arteaga, Hierrezuelo, Conde

== Finals ==
=== FC Barcelona Regal vs. Real Madrid ===
The finals are best-of-5 series.

June 6
20:45

Report

FC Barcelona Regal	81–80	Real Madrid
Scoring by quarter: 15-20, 22-23, 17-23, 27-14
Pts: Navarro 21; Rebs: Vázquez 7 Asts: Huertas 3 PIR: Lorbek, Mickeal 23		Pts: Carroll 18; Rebs: Tomić 7 Asts: Rodríguez 7 PIR: Carroll 18
1–0

Palau Blaugrana, Barcelona
Attendance: 6,377
Referees: J.A. Martín Bertrán, Redondo, J.C García González

June 8
22:00

Report

FC Barcelona Regal	69–75	Real Madrid
Scoring by quarter: 21–20, 19–20, 16–9, 13–26
Pts: Lorbek 22; Rebs: Vázquez 8 Asts: Lorbek 3 PIR: Vázquez 23		Pts: Rodríguez 14; Rebs: Tomić 9 Asts: Llull 5 PIR: Tomić 18
1–1

Palau Blaugrana, Barcelona
Attendance: 7,151
Referees: Hierrezuelo, Pérez Pizarro, Jiménez

June 11
22:00

Report

Real Madrid	85–59	FC Barcelona Regal
Scoring by quarter: 25–23, 21–8, 23–10, 16–17
Pts: Carroll 17; Rebs: Reyes 8 Asts: Rodríguez 9 PIR: Reyes 21		Pts: Wallace 13; Rebs: Vázquez 4 Asts: Eidson 2 PIR: Sada 11
2–1

Palacio de Deportes, Madrid
Attendance: 13,109
Referees: Arteaga, Conde, García Ortiz

June 13
22:00

Report

Real Madrid	75–81	FC Barcelona Regal
Scoring by quarter: 15–17, 19–22, 21–23, 20–19
Pts: Mirotić 14; Rebs: Tomić, Reyes 6 Asts: Veličković, Singler, 3 PIR: Tomić 18		Pts: Lorbek 24; Rebs: Mickeal 8 Asts: Navarro 5 PIR: Mickeal 22
2–2

Palacio de Deportes, Madrid
Attendance: 13,248
Referees: Hierrezuelo, Conde, Jiménez

June 16
18:00

Report

FC Barcelona Regal	73–69	Real Madrid
Scoring by quarter: 16–12, 23–22, 17–13, 17–22
Pts: Mickeal 17; Rebs: Mickeal 9 Asts: Sada 4 PIR: Vázquez 24		Pts: Carroll 16; Rebs: Tomić 11; Asts: three players 2 PIR: Carroll 12
FC Barcelona Regal wins series 3–2

Palau Blaugrana, Barcelona
Attendance: 7,691
Referees: Arteaga, Hierrezuelo, García Ortiz

ACB Finals MVP: (Slovenia) Erazem Lorbek

2012 ACB League
FC Barcelona
17th Title
