= All-Liga ACB Team =

Spanish basketball league award

The All-Liga ACB Team (Spanish: Quinteto Ideal de la ACB) is an award for the top-tier professional basketball league in Spain, the Spanish ACB League. It is the yearly selection of the league's top 10 basketball players by position. The award began with the 2003–04 season. The award is voted on by coaches, players, fans (through online voting), and the media.

== All-Liga ACB Team by season ==
Player (X) Denotes the number of times the player has been selected.
**Bold** text indicates the player who won the league's MVP in the same year.

- Player nationalities by national team.

Season	First Team		Second Team	
Season	Player	Team	Player	Team
2003–04	(United States) Elmer Bennett	Real Madrid		
2003–04	(Serbia and Montenegro) Dejan Bodiroga	FC Barcelona		
2003–04	(Argentina) **Andrés Nocioni** (MVP)	TAU Cerámica		
2003–04	(United States) Lou Roe	Etosa Alicante		
2003–04	(Argentina) Luis Scola	TAU Cerámica		
2004–05	(Spain) José Manuel Calderón	TAU Cerámica		
2004–05	(United States) Charlie Bell	Leche Río Breogán		
2004–05	(Spain) Carlos Jiménez	Adecco Estudiantes		
2004–05	(Spain) Jorge Garbajosa	Unicaja		
2004–05	(Argentina) **Luis Scola** (2×) (MVP)	TAU Cerámica		
2005–06	(Argentina) Pablo Prigioni	TAU Cerámica		
2005–06	(Spain) **Juan Carlos Navarro** (MVP)	Winterthur FC Barcelona		
2005–06	(Spain) Carlos Jiménez (2×)	Adecco Estudiantes		
2005–06	(Spain) Jorge Garbajosa (2×)	Unicaja		
2005–06	(Argentina) Luis Scola (3×)	TAU Cerámica		
2006–07	(Argentina) Pablo Prigioni (2×)	TAU Cerámica		
2006–07	(Spain) Juan Carlos Navarro (2×)	Winterthur FC Barcelona		
2006–07	(Spain) Rudy Fernández	DKV Joventut		
2006–07	(Spain) Felipe Reyes	Real Madrid		
2006–07	(Argentina) **Luis Scola** (4×) (MVP)	TAU Cerámica		
2007–08	(Spain) Ricky Rubio	DKV Joventut		
2007–08	(Brazil) Marcelinho Huertas	Iurbentia Bilbao Basket		
2007–08	(Spain) Rudy Fernández (2×)	DKV Joventut		
2007–08	(Spain) Felipe Reyes (2×)	Real Madrid		
2007–08	(Spain) **Marc Gasol** (MVP)	Akasvayu Girona		
2008–09	(Argentina) Pablo Prigioni (3×)	TAU Cerámica		
2008–09	(Serbia) Igor Rakočević	TAU Cerámica		
2008–09	(Spain) Juan Carlos Navarro (3×)	FC Barcelona Regal		
2008–09	(Spain) Fran Vázquez	FC Barcelona Regal		
2008–09	(Spain) **Felipe Reyes** (3×) (MVP)	Real Madrid		
2009–10	(Spain) Ricky Rubio (2×)	Regal FC Barcelona		
2009–10	(Spain) Juan Carlos Navarro (4×)	Regal FC Barcelona		
2009–10	(Spain) Carlos Suárez	Asefa Estudiantes		
2009–10	(Slovenia) Erazem Lorbek	Regal FC Barcelona		
2009–10	(Brazil) **Tiago Splitter** (MVP)	Caja Laboral		
2010–11	(Brazil) Marcelinho Huertas (2×)	Caja Laboral		
2010–11	(Azerbaijan) Jaycee Carroll	Gran Canaria 2014		
2010–11	(Spain) **Fernando San Emeterio** (MVP)	Caja Laboral		
2010–11	(Azerbaijan) Nik Caner-Medley	Asefa Estudiantes		
2010–11	(Croatia) Ante Tomić	Real Madrid		
2011–12	(Spain) Sergio Llull	Real Madrid		
2011–12	(Spain) Sergi Vidal	Lagun Aro GBC		
2011–12	(United States) **Andy Panko** (MVP)	Lagun Aro GBC		
2011–12	(Bosnia and Herzegovina) Mirza Teletović	Caja Laboral		
2011–12	(Slovenia) Erazem Lorbek (2×)	FC Barcelona Regal		
2012–13	(Spain) Sergio Rodríguez	Real Madrid		
2012–13	(Spain) Rudy Fernández (3x)	Real Madrid		
2012–13	(Argentina) Andrés Nocioni (2×)	Laboral Kutxa		
2012–13	(Spain) **Nikola Mirotić** (MVP)	Real Madrid		
2012–13	(Croatia) Ante Tomić (2x)	FC Barcelona Regal		
2013–14	(Spain) Sergio Rodríguez (2×)	Real Madrid		
2013–14	(Spain) Rudy Fernández (4×)	Real Madrid		
2013–14	(Central African Republic) Romain Sato	Valencia Basket		
2013–14	(Spain) Nikola Mirotić (2×)	Real Madrid		
2013–14	(Kosovo) **Justin Doellman** (MVP)	Valencia Basket		
2014–15	(Uruguay) Jayson Granger	Unicaja		
2014–15	(Spain) Sergio Llull (2×)	Real Madrid		
2014–15	(Spain) Pau Ribas	Valencia Basket		
2014–15	(Spain) **Felipe Reyes** (4×) (MVP)	Real Madrid		
2014–15	(Montenegro) Marko Todorović	Dominion Bilbao Basket		
2015–16	(Spain) Sergio Rodríguez (3×)	Real Madrid	(Czech Republic) Tomáš Satoranský	FC Barcelona Lassa
2015–16	(Bulgaria) Darius Adams	Laboral Kutxa Baskonia	(Croatia) Marko Popović	Montakit Fuenlabrada
2015–16	(Spain) Álex Mumbrú	Dominion Bilbao Basket	(Hungary) Ádám Hanga	Laboral Kutxa Baskonia
2015–16	(Croatia) Justin Hamilton	Valencia Basket	(Mexico) Gustavo Ayón	Real Madrid
2015–16	(Greece) **Ioannis Bourousis** (MVP)	Laboral Kutxa Baskonia	(Serbia) Dejan Musli	ICL Manresa
2016–17	(Spain) **Sergio Llull** (3x) (MVP)	Real Madrid	(United States) Shane Larkin	Baskonia
2016–17	(France) Edwin Jackson	Movistar Estudiantes	(Argentina) Facundo Campazzo	UCAM Murcia
2016–17	(Hungary) Ádám Hanga (2×)	Baskonia	(Serbia) Nemanja Nedović	Unicaja
2016–17	(Montenegro) Bojan Dubljević	Valencia Basket	(Slovenia) Anthony Randolph	Real Madrid
2016–17	(Georgia (country)) Giorgi Shermadini	MoraBanc Andorra	(Croatia) Ante Tomić (3×)	FC Barcelona Lassa
2017–18	(United States) Gary Neal	Tecnyconta Zaragoza	(France) Thomas Heurtel	FC Barcelona Lassa
2017–18	(Slovenia) **Luka Dončić** (MVP)	Real Madrid	(Argentina) Facundo Campazzo (2×)	Real Madrid
2017–18	(Israel) Sylven Landesberg	Movistar Estudiantes	(Poland) Mateusz Ponitka	Iberostar Tenerife
2017–18	(Georgia (country)) Tornike Shengelia	Baskonia	(Montenegro) Bojan Dubljević (2×)	Valencia Basket
2017–18	(Netherlands) Henk Norel	Delteco GBC	(Croatia) Ante Tomić (4×)	FC Barcelona Lassa
2018–19	(Argentina) Facundo Campazzo (3×)	Real Madrid	(France) Thomas Heurtel (2×)	FC Barcelona Lassa
2018–19	(Argentina) **Nicolás Laprovittola** (MVP)	Divina Seguros Joventut	(Spain) Jaime Fernández	Unicaja
2018–19	(Nigeria) Stan Okoye	Tecnyconta Zaragoza	(Spain) Javier Beirán	Iberostar Tenerife
2018–19	(Montenegro) Bojan Dubljević (3×)	Valencia Basket	(Georgia (country)) Tornike Shengelia (2×)	Baskonia
2018–19	(Cape Verde) Edy Tavares	Real Madrid	(France) Vincent Poirier	Baskonia
2019–20	(Argentina) Facundo Campazzo (4×)	Real Madrid	(Brazil) Marcelinho Huertas (3×)	Iberostar Tenerife
2019–20	(Slovenia) Klemen Prepelič	Joventut Badalona	(Hungary) Ádám Hanga (3×)	FC Barcelona
2019–20	(France) Axel Bouteille	Unicaja	(Spain) Alberto Abalde	Valencia Basket
2019–20	(Spain) **Nikola Mirotić** (3×) (MVP)	FC Barcelona	(Georgia (country)) Tornike Shengelia (3×)	Baskonia
2019–20	(Georgia (country)) Giorgi Shermadini (2×)	Iberostar Tenerife	(Cape Verde) Edy Tavares (2×)	Real Madrid (2×)
2020–21	(Brazil) Marcelinho Huertas (4×)	Lenovo Tenerife	(United States) Melo Trimble	Urbas Fuenlabrada
2020–21	(United States) Pierriá Henry	TD Systems Baskonia	(United States) Cory Higgins	FC Barcelona
2020–21	(Spain) Xabier López-Arostegui	Joventut Badalona	(Lithuania) Rokas Giedraitis	TD Systems Baskonia
2020–21	(Cape Verde) Edy Tavares (3×)	Real Madrid	(Spain) Nikola Mirotić (4×)	FC Barcelona
2020–21	(Georgia (country)) **Giorgi Shermadini** (3×) (MVP)	Lenovo Tenerife	(Cuba) Jasiel Rivero	Hereda San Pablo Burgos
2021–22	(Brazil) Marcelinho Huertas (5×)	Lenovo Tenerife	(United States) Shannon Evans	Coosur Real Betis
2021–22	(Argentina) Nicolás Laprovittola (2×)	FC Barcelona	(United States) Isaiah Taylor	UCAM Murcia
2021–22	(Bosnia and Herzegovina) **Džanan Musa** (MVP)	Río Breogán	(United States) Joe Thomasson	BAXI Manresa
2021–22	(Nigeria) Chima Moneke	BAXI Manresa	(Spain) Nikola Mirotić (5×)	FC Barcelona
2021–22	(Georgia (country)) Giorgi Shermadini (4×)	Lenovo Tenerife	(Cape Verde) Edy Tavares (4×)	Real Madrid
2022–23	(United States) Darius Thompson	Cazoo Baskonia	(Brazil) Marcelinho Huertas (6×)	Lenovo Tenerife
2022–23	(United States) Markus Howard	Cazoo Baskonia	(Argentina) Nicolás Laprovittola (3×)	FC Barcelona
2022–23	(Bosnia and Herzegovina) Džanan Musa (2×)	Real Madrid	(Spain) Joel Parra	Joventut Badalona
2022–23	(Cape Verde) Edy Tavares (5×)	Real Madrid	(Spain) Nikola Mirotić (6×)	FC Barcelona
2022–23	(Georgia (country)) **Giorgi Shermadini** (5×) (MVP)	Lenovo Tenerife	(Croatia) Ante Tomić (5×)	Joventut Badalona
2023–24	(Argentina) **Facundo Campazzo** (5×) (MVP)	Real Madrid	(Brazil) Marcelinho Huertas (7×)	Lenovo Tenerife
2023–24	(United States) Markus Howard (2×)	Cazoo Baskonia	(Dominican Republic) Jean Montero	Morabanc Andorra
2023–24	(Dominican Republic) Andrés Feliz	Joventut Badalona	(Senegal) Brancou Badio	Baxi Manresa
2023–24	(United States) Dylan Osetkowski	Unicaja	(Argentina) Nicolás Brussino	Dreamland Gran Canaria
2023–24	(Georgia (country)) Giorgi Shermadini (6×)	Lenovo Tenerife	(Nigeria) Chima Moneke (2×)	Baskonia
2024–25	(Brazil) **Marcelinho Huertas** (8×) (MVP)	La Laguna Tenerife	(Montenegro) Kendrick Perry	Unicaja
2024–25	(Dominican Republic) Jean Montero (2×)	Valencia Basket	(United States) Jerrick Harding	MoraBanc Andorra
2024–25	(Croatia) Mario Hezonja	Real Madrid	(United States) Kameron Taylor	Unicaja
2024–25	(United States) Derrick Alston Jr.	Baxi Manresa	(United States) Jabari Parker	FC Barcelona
2024–25	(Croatia) Ante Tomić (6×)	Joventut Badalona	(Georgia (country)) Giorgi Shermadini (7×)	La Laguna Tenerife
2025–26	(United States) David DeJulius	UCAM Murcia	(Brazil) Marcelinho Huertas (9×)	La Laguna Tenerife
2025–26	(Dominican Republic) Jean Montero (3×)	Valencia Basket	(Spain) Ricky Rubio (3×)	Joventut Badalona
2025–26	(Croatia) **Mario Hezonja** (2×) (MVP)	Real Madrid	(Argentina) Gonzalo Corbalán	San Pablo Burgos
2025–26	(France) Timothé Luwawu-Cabarrot	Kosner Baskonia	(Georgia (country)) Giorgi Shermadini (8×)	La Laguna Tenerife
2025–26	(Croatia) Luka Božić	Covirán Granada	(Cape Verde) Edy Tavares (6×)	Real Madrid

== See also ==
- ACB Most Valuable Player Award
- ACB Finals Most Valuable Player Award
- ACB Rising Star Award
