= 2024–25 ACB season =

Spanish professional basketball season

Liga Endesa^{1}
- Season: 2024–25
- Matches played: 325
- Teams: 18

Regular season
- Top seed: Real Madrid
- Season MVP: (Brazil) Marcelinho Huertas
- Relegated: Coviran Granada; Leyma Coruña

Finals
- Champions: Real Madrid; 16th ACB title 38th Spanish title
- Runners-up: Valencia Basket
- Semi-finalists: La Laguna Tenerife; Unicaja
- Finals MVP: (Argentina) Facundo Campazzo

Statistical leaders
Points	(United States) Jerrick Harding	20.0
Rebounds	(Bosnia and Herzegovina) Emir Sulejmanović	7.2
Assists	(Brazil) Marcelinho Huertas	6.9
Index Rating	(Croatia) Ante Tomić	20.6

Records
- Biggest home win: Zaragoza 111–53 Breogán (2 November 2024)
- Biggest away win: Zaragoza 71–115 Valencia (1 March 2025)
- Highest scoring: Valencia 125–128 Baskonia (27 April 2025)
- Winning streak: Real Madrid (26 matches)
- Losing streak: Leyma Coruña; Coviran Granada (9 matches)
- Highest attendance: 13,082; Baskonia 91–95 Andorra (5 October 2024)
- Lowest attendance: 2,956; Andorra 87–71 Granada (26 October 2024)
- Attendance: 2,155,837 (6,633 per match)
- ^{1} Sponsored league name, referring to Endesa.

The 2024–25 ACB season, also known as Liga Endesa for sponsorship reasons, was the 42nd season of the top Spanish professional basketball league, since its establishment in 1983. It started on 28 September 2024 with the regular season and ended on 25 June 2025 with the finals.

Real Madrid defended successfully the Spanish crown after winning back–to–back Liga ACB titles to achieve their 16th ACB title in a record-extending 38th Spanish title by sweeping Valencia Basket in the finals.

== Teams ==
=== Promotion and relegation (pre-season) ===
A total of 18 teams contested the league, including 16 sides from the 2023–24 season and two promoted from the 2023–24 LEB Oro. This include the top team from the LEB Oro, and the winners of the LEB Oro Final Four.

On May 10, 2024, Leyma Coruña became the first team to clinch the promotion to ACB after an 80–74 win to Melilla Ciudad del Deporte in the last round of the regular season that crowned it as LEB Oro champions. It was the debut season of the Galician team in the Spanish top tier and the second participation of the city of A Coruña in the Spanish top flight after the participation of Bosco in 1968–69 season. On June 9, 2024, Hiopos Lleida became the second team to achieve the promotion to ACB after winning the LEB Oro Final Four in an 85–70 proud win against Movistar Estudiantes to clinch the last spot to ACB. It was the debut season of the Catalan team and it meant the return of the city of Lleida to the Spanish top flight after the previous spell of CE Lleida in the league.

The first team to be relegated from ACB was Zunder Palencia, after a 94–101 loss to Baskonia on 27 April 2024, suffering immediate relegation. The second team relegated to Primera FEB was Monbus Obradoiro, after a 97–71 win in the last round against Joventut Badalona on 12 May 2024 that was not enough, ending their 13-year stay in the top tier.

▲ Promoted from LEB Oro	▼ Relegated to Primera FEB
Leyma Coruña; Hiopos Lleida	Monbus Obradoiro; Zunder Palencia

=== Venues and locations ===
Location of teams in 2024–25 ACB

Team	Home city	Arena	Capacity
Barça	Barcelona	Palau Blaugrana	7,786
Baskonia	Vitoria-Gasteiz	Buesa Arena	15,504
Bàsquet Girona	Girona	Fontajau	5,500
Baxi Manresa	Manresa	Nou Congost	5,000
Casademont Zaragoza	Zaragoza	Pabellón Príncipe Felipe	10,744
Coviran Granada	Granada	Palacio de Deportes	8,100
Dreamland Gran Canaria	Las Palmas	Gran Canaria Arena	9,870
Hiopos Lleida	Lleida	Espai Fruita Barris Nord	6,100
Joventut Badalona	Badalona	Palau Municipal d'Esports	12,760
La Laguna Tenerife	San Cristóbal de La Laguna	Santiago Martín	5,100
Leyma Coruña	A Coruña	Coliseum da Coruña	9,300
MoraBanc Andorra	Andorra la Vella	Pavelló Toni Martí	5,001
Real Madrid	Madrid	Movistar Arena	13,109
Río Breogán	Lugo	Pazo dos Deportes	5,310
Surne Bilbao Basket	Bilbao	Bilbao Arena	10,014
UCAM Murcia	Murcia	Palacio de Deportes	7,454
Unicaja	Málaga	Martín Carpena	10,699
Valencia Basket	Valencia	La Fonteta	8,500

=== Personnel and kits ===
Team	Head coach	Captain	Kit manufacturer	Shirt sponsor (chest)
Barça	(Spanish Basketball Federation) Joan Peñarroya	(Spain) Álex Abrines	Nike	Assistència Sanitària
Baskonia	(Spanish Basketball Federation) Pablo Laso	(Lithuania) Tadas Sedekerskis	Puma	Kosner
Bàsquet Girona	(Spanish Basketball Federation) Moncho Fernández	(Spain) Sergi Martínez	Puma	FIATC
Baxi Manresa	(Spanish Basketball Federation) Diego Ocampo	(Spain) Guillem Jou	Pentex	Baxi Climatización
Casademont Zaragoza	(Spanish Basketball Federation) Rodrigo San Miguel	(Spain) Santiago Yusta	Mercury	Casademont
Coviran Granada	(Spanish Basketball Federation) Pablo Pin	(Spain) Pere Tomàs	Vive	Coviran
Dreamland Gran Canaria	(Basketball Federation of Slovenia) Jaka Lakovič	(France) Andrew Albicy	Spalding	Dreamland, Gran Canaria
Hiopos Lleida	(Spanish Basketball Federation) Gerard Encuentra	(Spain) Rafa Villar	Pentex	Hiopos
Joventut Badalona	(Spanish Basketball Federation) Dani Miret	(Spain) Pau Ribas	Joma	Fundación Probitas
La Laguna Tenerife	(Spanish Basketball Federation) Txus Vidorreta	(Brazil) Marcelo Huertas	Austral	La Laguna, Tenerife
Leyma Coruña	(Spanish Basketball Federation) Diego Epifanio	(Spain) Álex Hernández	Macron	Estrella Galicia 0,0
MoraBanc Andorra	(Spanish Basketball Federation) Joan Plaza	(Spain) Nacho Llovet	Kappa	MoraBanc, Andorra
Real Madrid	(Spanish Basketball Federation) Chus Mateo	(Spain) Sergio Llull	Adidas	Autohero
Río Breogán	(Spanish Basketball Federation) Luis Casimiro	(Spain) Erik Quintela	Adidas	Estrella Galicia 0,0
Surne Bilbao Basket	(Spanish Basketball Federation) Jaume Ponsarnau	(Spain) Xavi Rabaseda	Hummel	Surne Seguros & Pensiones
UCAM Murcia	(Spanish Basketball Federation) Sito Alonso	(Montenegro) Nemanja Radović	Nike	UCAM
Unicaja	(Spanish Basketball Federation) Ibon Navarro	(Spain) Alberto Díaz	Joma	Unicaja, Málaga
Valencia Basket	(Spanish Basketball Federation) Pedro Martínez	(Spain) Josep Puerto	Luanvi	Roig Arena

=== Coaching changes ===
Team	Outgoing coach	Manner of departure	Date of vacancy	Position in table	Incoming coach	Date of appointment
Baskonia	(Basketball Federation of Montenegro) Duško Ivanović	End of contract	27 May 2024	Pre-season	(Spanish Basketball Federation) Pablo Laso	28 June 2024
Baxi Manresa	(Spanish Basketball Federation) Pedro Martínez	Signed by Valencia Basket	29 May 2024	Pre-season	(Spanish Basketball Federation) Diego Ocampo	17 June 2024
Valencia Basket	(Spanish Basketball Federation) Xavi Albert	End of interim period	29 May 2024	Pre-season	(Spanish Basketball Federation) Pedro Martínez	29 May 2024
Barça	(Spanish Basketball Federation) Roger Grimau	Sacked	8 June 2024	Pre-season	(Spanish Basketball Federation) Joan Peñarroya	14 June 2024
Río Breogán	(Croatian Basketball Federation) Veljko Mršić	Sacked	3 December 2024	18th (2–7)	(Spanish Basketball Federation) Luis Casimiro	4 December 2024
Bàsquet Girona	(Hellenic Basketball Federation) Fotios Katsikaris	Sacked	14 December 2024	18th (2–9)	(Spanish Basketball Federation) Moncho Fernández	16 December 2024
MoraBanc Andorra	(Spanish Basketball Federation) Natxo Lezkano	Sacked	22 January 2025	15th (5–12)	(Spanish Basketball Federation) Joan Plaza	23 January 2025
Casademont Zaragoza	(Spanish Basketball Federation) Porfirio Fisac	Sacked	1 May 2025	11th (12–17)	(Spanish Basketball Federation) Rodrigo San Miguel (interim)	1 May 2025

== Regular season ==
=== League table ===
Pos	Team	Pld	W	L	PF	PA	PD	Qualification or relegation
1	Real Madrid	34	30	4	2967	2641	+326	Qualification to playoffs
2	Valencia Basket	34	25 (Note: Valencia Basket finished ahead of La Laguna Tenerife on head–to–head record: Valencia Basket 96–81 La Laguna Tenerife, La Laguna Tenerife 99–102 Valencia Basket.)	9	3289	2910	+379	Qualification to playoffs
3	La Laguna Tenerife	34	25	9	2970	2827	+143	Qualification to playoffs
4	Unicaja	34	23	11	3057	2857	+200	Qualification to playoffs
5	Barça	34	21	13	3133	2936	+197	Qualification to playoffs
6	Joventut Badalona	34	20	14	2892	2828	+64	Qualification to playoffs
7	Dreamland Gran Canaria	34	19 (Note: Dreamland Gran Canaria finished ahead of Baskonia on head–to–head point difference: Dreamland Gran Canaria 92–86 Baskonia, Baskonia 84–80 Dreamland Gran Canaria.)	15	2850	2830	+20	Qualification to playoffs
8	Baskonia	34	19	15	3026	3015	+11	Qualification to playoffs
9	UCAM Murcia	34	17 (Note: UCAM Murcia finished ahead of Baxi Manresa on head–to–head point difference: Baxi Manresa 80–74 UCAM Murcia, UCAM Murcia 81–71 Baxi Manresa.)	17	2796	2779	+17	
10	Baxi Manresa	34	17	17	2957	2884	+73	
11	MoraBanc Andorra	34	14	20	2980	3093	−113	
12	Casademont Zaragoza	34	13 (Note: Casademont Zaragoza finished ahead of Río Breogán on head–to–head point difference: Casademont Zaragoza 111–53 Río Breogán, Río Breogán 90–85 Casademont Zaragoza.)	21	3034	3087	−53	
13	Río Breogán	34	13	21	2692	2949	−257	
14	Bàsquet Girona	34	12	22	2793	3000	−207	
15	Hiopos Lleida	34	11 (Note: Hiopos Lleida finished ahead of Surne Bilbao Basket on head–to–head point difference: Hiopos Lleida 84–66 Surne Bilbao Basket, Surne Bilbao Basket 91–75 Hiopos Lleida.)	23	2807	2993	−186	
16	Surne Bilbao Basket	34	11	23	2783	2874	−91	
17	Coviran Granada	34	9	25	2760	2969	−209	Relegation to Primera FEB
18	Leyma Coruña	34	7	27	2938	3252	−314	Relegation to Primera FEB

Source: ACB
Rules for classification: 1) Win–loss record; 2) Head–to–head record; 3) Head–to–head point difference; 4) Point difference; 5) Points scored; 6) Sum of quotients of points scored (Note: Head–to–head record is used only after all the matches between the teams in question have been played)

=== Results ===
Home \ Away	BAR	BKN	GIR	BAX	CAZ	COV	DGC	HIO	JOV	LLT	COR	MBA	RMB	BRE	SBB	UCM	UNI	VBC
Barça	—	89–93	97–74	92–103	97–95	91–65	104–90	98–72	90–91	92–95	106–80	105–79	89–91	102–79	97–84	86–79	83–81	102–99
Baskonia	110–98	—	92–76	90–84	90–84	103–82	84–80	100–99	79–82	89–93	114–66	91–95	82–89	97–91	100–97	95–92	88–90	91–116
Bàsquet Girona	91–90	96–67	—	84–80	89–101	52–82	86–95	95–83	83–76	84–93	81–98	85–98	71–79	91–85	100–94	75–82	91–85	85–91
Baxi Manresa	85–72	80–82	95–84	—	95–83	93–86	79–58	89–95	87–72	86–83	104–89	107–111	65–67	93–104	89–74	80–74	109–69	77–73
Casademont Zgz	108–95	86–85	96–68	92–93	—	88–95	87–97	101–91	96–95	89–93	84–76	86–75	89–104	111–53	82–71	79–88	84–69	71–115
Coviran Granada	86–93	73–75	78–74	86–80	97–91	—	82–97	82–85	87–77	75–86	80–77	77–89	79–84	91–82	72–84	82–88	68–84	69–97
Dreamland GC	74–77	92–86	89–84	94–89	96–94	98–83	—	94–90	79–68	67–70	80–72	94–106	54–69	73–82	80–67	69–76	91–89	97–94
Hiopos Lleida	74–78	74–78	85–90	83–81	97–91	87–74	88–78	—	81–86	72–84	101–106	80–70	84–95	94–81	84–66	79–77	69–98	67–76
Joventut	86–93	90–71	83–68	85–92	89–79	96–82	89–78	92–72	—	93–86	107–104	93–86	80–76	70–76	87–79	91–76	75–79	89–104
La Laguna TFE	91–95	88–80	100–80	94–86	106–97	95–87	84–74	91–88	82–81	—	92–83	96–84	68–79	96–83	86–75	82–74	78–91	99–102
Leyma Coruña	93–92	101–105	89–99	74–89	110–86	93–89	90–98	97–84	85–94	62–87	—	91–104	86–85	98–106	79–100	78–86	83–90	91–99
MoraBanc And	91–113	93–88	97–106	83–81	79–86	87–71	71–91	96–79	86–99	83–92	112–87	—	84–100	93–101	84–81	71–83	89–106	86–84
Real Madrid	73–71	83–78	95–67	86–61	101–95	79–67	83–77	85–78	86–73	96–86	90–74	98–97	—	106–69	88–70	80–75	90–77	96–89
Río Breogán	77–70	88–82	77–74	79–88	90–85	74–92	74–82	77–81	65–82	78–79	83–80	94–74	69–79	—	76–71	70–86	81–79	75–87
Surne Bilbao	68–85	67–69	96–83	88–73	104–111	91–88	96–78	91–75	79–95	65–75	79–67	82–74	83–79	90–72	—	80–83	81–86	98–103
UCAM Murcia	90–95	82–91	64–76	81–71	88–74	84–81	63–83	88–81	100–83	77–78	105–93	79–85	64–85	79–63	89–83	—	77–89	88–96
Unicaja	103–96	94–73	90–73	105–97	85–71	95–78	88–94	101–63	78–83	84–81	114–105	98–80	105–107	86–77	96–79	104–93	—	94–86
Valencia Basket	86–100	125–128	98–78	112–96	111–82	120–94	86–79	107–92	84–60	96–81	127–81	89–88	85–84	108–61	89–70	71–86	84–75	—

Source: ACB
Legend: Blue = home team win; Red = away team win.

== Playoffs ==
Quarterfinals
1	Real Madrid	82	112	2
8	Baskonia	76	103	0
4	Unicaja	97	81	97	2
5	Barça	101	59	95	1
2	Valencia Basket	98	102	2
7	Dreamland Gran Canaria	74	94	0
3	La Laguna Tenerife	96	80	2
6	Joventut Badalona	81	60	0

Semifinals
1	Real Madrid	99	90	84	86	3
4	Unicaja	81	75	86	79	1
2	Valencia Basket	83	105	94	3
3	La Laguna Tenerife	65	74	87	0

Finals
1	Real Madrid	89	102	81	3
2	Valencia Basket	75	96	70	0

Source: ACB

== Final standings ==
Pos	Team	Pld	W	L	Qualification or relegation
1	Real Madrid (C)	43	38	5	Already qualified to EuroLeague
2	Valencia Basket	42	30	12	Already qualified to EuroLeague
3	La Laguna Tenerife	39	27	12	Qualification to Champions League regular season
4	Unicaja	41	26	15	Qualification to Champions League regular season
5	Barça	37	22	15	Already qualified to EuroLeague
6	Joventut Badalona	36	20	16	Qualification to Champions League regular season
7	Dreamland Gran Canaria	36	19	17	Qualification to Champions League regular season
8	Baskonia	36	19	17	Already qualified to EuroLeague
9	UCAM Murcia	34	17	17	Qualification to Champions League qualifying rounds
10	Baxi Manresa	34	17	17	Qualification to EuroCup
11	MoraBanc Andorra	34	14	20	
12	Casademont Zaragoza	34	13	21	Qualification to FIBA Europe Cup regular season
13	Río Breogán	34	13	21	
14	Bàsquet Girona	34	12	22	
15	Hiopos Lleida	34	11	23	
16	Surne Bilbao Basket	34	11	23	Qualification to FIBA Europe Cup regular season
17	Coviran Granada (R)	34	9	25	Relegation to Primera FEB
18	Leyma Coruña (R)	34	7	27	Relegation to Primera FEB

Source: ACB
(C) Champions; (R) Relegated

== Statistical leaders ==
=== Performance index rating ===
Pos	Player	Club	PIR
1	(Croatia) Ante Tomić	Joventut Badalona	20.6
2	(Dominican Republic) Jean Montero	Valencia Basket	18.9
3	(United States) Jerrick Harding	MoraBanc Andorra	17.6
4	(Brazil) Marcelinho Huertas	La Laguna Tenerife	17.2
5	(France) Amine Noua	Coviran Granada	17.2

=== Points ===
Pos	Player	Club	PPG
1	(United States) Jerrick Harding	MoraBanc Andorra	20.0
2	(United States) Derrick Alston Jr.	Baxi Manresa	16.9
3	(Jamaica) Dylan Ennis	UCAM Murcia	16.6
4	(France) Amine Noua	Coviran Granada	16.1
5	(Dominican Republic) Jean Montero	Valencia Basket	16.0

=== Rebounds ===
Pos	Player	Club	RPG
1	(Bosnia and Herzegovina) Emir Sulejmanović	Casademont Zaragoza	7.2
2	(Croatia) Ante Tomić	Joventut Badalona	7.1
3	(Cape Verde) Edy Tavares	Real Madrid	6.8
4	(Spain) Jaime Pradilla	Valencia Basket	6.6
5	(France) Amine Noua	Coviran Granada	6.5

=== Assists ===
Pos	Player	Club	APG
1	(Brazil) Marcelinho Huertas	La Laguna Tenerife	6.9
2	(United States) Brandon Taylor	Leyma Coruña	6.8
3	(Armenia) Chris Jones	Valencia Basket	5.1
4	(Argentina) Facundo Campazzo	Real Madrid	4.9
5	(Canada) Trae Bell-Haynes	Casademont Zaragoza	4.9

Source: ACB

== Attendances to arenas ==
=== Average attendances ===
Pos	Team	Total	High	Low	Average	Change
1	Unicaja	208,737	10,681	8,014	9,940	+0.1%
2	Baskonia	171,826	13,082	7,072	9,546	+5.5%
3	Real Madrid	187,366	12,050	5,984	8,517	−0.9%
4	Surne Bilbao Basket	141,371	9,576	7,343	8,316	−0.8%
5	Leyma Coruña	126,742	9,300	5,025	7,455	n/a^{1}
6	Coviran Granada	118,799	7,997	4,189	6,988	−6.6%
7	Joventut Badalona	122,659	12,231	4,719	6,814	+1.5%
8	Casademont Zaragoza	112,487	10,524	4,115	6,617	+15.7%
9	Dreamland Gran Canaria	118,935	8,269	5,062	6,608	+2.5%
10	Valencia Basket	138,581	8,081	5,600	6,599	+5.8%
11	UCAM Murcia	105,366	7,262	4,715	6,198	−3.5%
12	Barça	101,910	7,334	4,468	5,662	+0.9%
13	Hiopos Lleida	90,407	6,100	4,598	5,318	n/a^{1}
14	Río Breogán	88,947	5,310	4,720	5,232	+1.4%
15	La Laguna Tenerife	94,625	5,156	4,768	4,980	+0.8%
16	Bàsquet Girona	83,983	5,288	4,278	4,940	−0.8%
17	Baxi Manresa	82,878	5,000	4,633	4,875	+0.3%
18	MoraBanc Andorra	60,218	4,383	2,956	3,542	−7.4%
	League total	2,155,837	13,082	2,956	6,633	+3.2%

Source: ACB
Notes:
1: Team played previous season in LEB Oro.

== Awards ==
All official awards of the 2024–25 ACB season.

=== MVP ===
Pos.	Player	Team
PG	(Brazil) Marcelinho Huertas	La Laguna Tenerife

=== Finals MVP ===
Pos.	Player	Team
PG	(Argentina) Facundo Campazzo	Real Madrid

=== All-ACB Teams ===
Pos.	First Team		Second Team	
Pos.	Player	Team	Player	Team
PG	(Brazil) Marcelinho Huertas	La Laguna Tenerife	(Montenegro) Kendrick Perry	Unicaja
SG	(Dominican Republic) Jean Montero	Valencia Basket	(United States) Jerrick Harding	MoraBanc Andorra
SF	(Croatia) Mario Hezonja	Real Madrid	(United States) Kameron Taylor	Unicaja
PF	(United States) Derrick Alston Jr.	Baxi Manresa	(United States) Jabari Parker	Barça
C	(Croatia) Ante Tomić	Joventut Badalona	(Georgia (country)) Giorgi Shermadini	La Laguna Tenerife

=== Best Young Player ===
Pos.	Player	Team
PG	(Dominican Republic) Jean Montero	Valencia Basket

=== Best All-Young Team ===
Pos.	Player	Team
PG	(Spain) Mario Saint-Supéry	Baxi Manresa
PG	(Dominican Republic) Jean Montero	Valencia Basket
PG	(Spain) Sergio de Larrea	Valencia Basket
SF	(Spain) Hugo González	Real Madrid
PF	(Belgium) Thijs De Ridder	Surne Bilbao Basket

=== Top Scorer Award ===
Pos.	Player	Team
SG	(United States) Jerrick Harding	MoraBanc Andorra

=== Best Defender ===
Pos.	Player	Team
C	(Cape Verde) Edy Tavares	Real Madrid

=== Player of the round ===
Round	Player	Team	PIR
1	(Canada) Kassius Robertson	Joventut Badalona	28
2	(United States) Semi Ojeleye	Valencia Basket	28
2	(Bosnia and Herzegovina) Džanan Musa	Real Madrid	28
3	(Azerbaijan) Donta Hall	Baskonia	45
4	(United States) Jerrick Harding	MoraBanc Andorra	35
5	(Sweden) Ludde Håkanson	UCAM Murcia	32
5	(United States) Ben Lammers	MoraBanc Andorra	32
6	(Angola) Jilson Bango	Casademont Zaragoza	35
7	(United States) Markus Howard	Baskonia	35
8	(United States) Tyson Carter	Unicaja	30
9	(United States) Trey Thompkins	Leyma Coruña	36
10	(Angola) Jilson Bango (2)	Casademont Zaragoza	34
10	(Nigeria) Chima Moneke	Baskonia	34
11	(United States) Jerrick Harding (2)	MoraBanc Andorra	40
12	(United States) Sam Dekker	Joventut Badalona	35
13	(Spain) Rubén Domínguez	Surne Bilbao Basket	34
13	(Angola) Jilson Bango (3)	Casademont Zaragoza	34
14	(United States) Justin Anderson	Barça	29
15	(Bosnia and Herzegovina) Džanan Musa (2)	Real Madrid	38
16	(Jamaica) Dylan Ennis	UCAM Murcia	30
16	(Democratic Republic of the Congo) Jordan Sakho	Río Breogán	30
16	(Argentina) Juan Fernández	Bàsquet Girona	30
17	(Nigeria) Chima Moneke (2)	Baskonia	43
18	(Ukraine) Artem Pustovyi	Joventut Badalona	30
19	(United States) Caleb Homesley	Dreamland Gran Canaria	32
20	(Croatia) Mario Hezonja	Real Madrid	33
21	(France) Amine Noua	Covirán Granada	31
22	(Croatia) Ante Tomić	Joventut Badalona	31
23	(Dominican Republic) Jean Montero	Valencia Basket	44
24	(Georgia (country)) Giorgi Shermadini	La Laguna Tenerife	38
25	(Guinea) Shannon Evans	MoraBanc Andorra	33
26	(Georgia (country)) Giorgi Shermadini (2)	La Laguna Tenerife	34
27	(Croatia) Ante Tomić (2)	Joventut Badalona	30
28	(United States) Cameron Hunt	Baxi Manresa	33
29	(Dominican Republic) Jean Montero (2)	Valencia Basket	43
30	(United States) Devon Dotson	Joventut Badalona	29
31	(France) Sekou Doumbouya	MoraBanc Andorra	33
32	(Canada) Trae Bell-Haynes	Casademont Zaragoza	40
33	(Ukraine) Artem Pustovyi (2)	Joventut Badalona	35
34	(Azerbaijan) Donta Hall (2)	Baskonia	25

=== Player of the month ===
Month	Rounds	Player	Team	PIR	W–L	Ref
October	1–5	(United States) Jerrick Harding	MoraBanc Andorra	20.8	3–2	
November	6–8	(Croatia) Ante Tomić	Joventut Badalona	24.0	2–1	
December	9–13	(Angola) Jilson Bango	Casademont Zaragoza	23.4	4–1	
January	14–18	(United States) Derrick Alston Jr.	Baxi Manresa	22.0	4–1	
February	19–20	(Croatia) Ante Tomić (2)	Joventut Badalona	25.0	1–1	
March	21–25	(Dominican Republic) Jean Montero	Valencia Basket	27.5	5–0	
April	26–29	(Croatia) Ante Tomić (3)	Joventut Badalona	27.5	2–2	
May	30–34	(Dominican Republic) Jean Montero (2)	Valencia Basket	22.4	4–1	
