= Jerrick Harding =

American basketball player (born 1000)

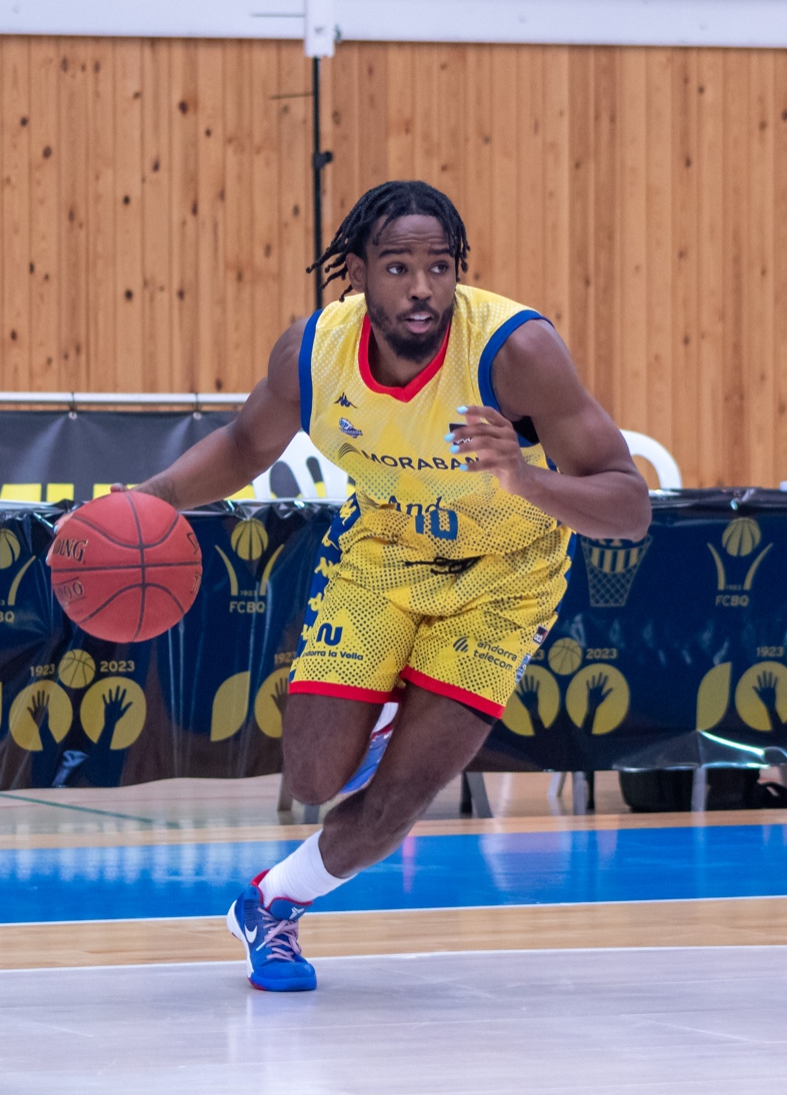
- Harding with BC Andorra in 2024

No. 7 – Türk Telekom
- Position: Shooting guard
- League: BSL; EuroCup

Personal information
- Born: April 13, 1998 (age 28) Wichita, Kansas, U.S.
- Listed height: 6 ft 1 in (1.85 m)
- Listed weight: 180 lb (82 kg)

Career information
- High school: Wichita Southeast (Wichita, Kansas)
- College: Weber State (2016–2020)
- NBA draft: 2020: undrafted
- Playing career: 2020–present

Career history
- 2020–2022: Nymburk
- 2022–2023: Manresa
- 2023–2025: Andorra
- 2025–2026: Rytas Vilnius
- 2026–present: Türk Telekom

Career highlights
- FIBA Champions League champion (2026); All-FIBA Champions League First Team (2026); FIBA Champions League Top Scorer (2026); All-Liga ACB Second Team (2025); Liga ACB Top Scorer (2025); 2× Czech Republic League champion (2021, 2022); 2× First-team All-Big Sky (2018, 2019); Second-team All-Big Sky (2020)

Jerrick Deontre Harding (born April 13, 1998) is an American-born Polish professional basketball player for Türk Telekom of the Turkish Basketbol Süper Ligi (BSL) and the EuroCup. He played college basketball for the Weber State Wildcats and left as the program's all-time leading scorer.

== Early life and high school career ==
Harding started playing basketball at age two and was also involved in football and soccer in his childhood. He began competing on the Amateur Athletic Union circuit at a late age. Harding played for Wichita Southeast High School in Wichita, Kansas. He did not receive any NCAA Division I offers until his senior season, when he averaged 27.8 points, 4.6 rebounds and 1.7 steals per game, leading his team to a 20–5 record and to the Class 6A state title game. In the state tournament, he averaged 34.3 points per game and his 103 points broke a 37-year-old 6A tournament record. He graduated as his school's all-time leading scorer. Harding was named Kansas Gatorade Player of the Year. On April 22, 2016, he committed to play college basketball for Weber State over an offer from Loyola (Illinois). He was drawn to the program in part because Damian Lillard, one of his favorite players, had played there.

== College career ==
Harding received sparse minutes in his freshman season before working his way into the rotation and had double-digit points in seven straight games to end the season. Harding averaged 9.3 points per game as a freshman at Weber State, even though his coach wanted to redshirt him at first. On March 3, 2018, he scored a school-record 46 points in a 95–92 overtime win over Montana State. As a sophomore, Harding averaged 22 points per game and was named to the First Team All-Big Sky. He finished the season with 682 points, the most by a sophomore in school history. On December 22, 2018, Harding scored a junior season-high 36 points in an 83–69 victory over Delaware State. He averaged 21.4 points per game as a junior and earned First Team All-Big Sky honors for his second straight year. After the season, Harding declared for the 2019 NBA draft, before returning to school. On January 25, 2020, Harding scored 32 points, including nine in overtime, in a 87–85 victory over Montana. He became the third Weber State player to surpass the 2,000 point milestone. On February 6, he scored a senior season-high 44 points and surpassed Jeremy Senglin to become Weber State's all-time leading scorer in a 70–66 win over Sacramento State. As a senior, Harding averaged 22.2 points per game, which ranked seventh among NCAA Division I players, as well as 2.2 assists and 2.9 rebounds per game. He was a Second Team All-Big Sky selection. He finished his career as Weber State's all-time leader in free throw percentage, at 86.8 percent, and scored the third-most points in Big Sky history.

== Professional career ==
On August 4, 2020, Harding signed his first professional contract with Basketball Nymburk of the Czech National Basketball League.

On July 23, 2022, Harding signed for Baxi Manresa of the Liga ACB.

On July 28, 2023, he signed for MoraBanc Andorra of the Liga ACB. In the 2024-25 ACB season, Harding won the ACB Player of the Month Award for the month of October. He was the top scorer during the 2024–25 ACB season with 20 points per game. He was named to the All-Liga ACB Second Team for the 2024-25 ACB season.

On July 27, 2025, Harding signed with Rytas Vilnius of the Lithuanian Basketball League (LKL) and the Basketball Champions League (BCL).

On July 6, 2026, he signed with Türk Telekom of the Turkish Basketbol Süper Ligi (BSL).

== National team career ==
In August 2025, Harding received Polish citizenship together with Jordan Loyd, and became eligible to play for the Poland national team.

== Career statistics ==
Legend
GP	Games played	MPG	Minutes per game	FG%	Field goal percentage
3P%	3-point field goal percentage	FT%	Free throw percentage	RPG	Rebounds per game
APG	Assists per game	SPG	Steals per game	BPG	Blocks per game
PPG	Points per game	**Bold**	Career high		Led the league

=== Domestic leagues ===
Year	Team	League	GP	MPG	FG%	3P%	FT%	RPG	APG	SPG	BPG	PPG
2022–23	(Spain) Manresa	ACB	32	24.5	.443	.348	.876	2.5	1.8	.7	.1	16.2
2023–24	(Spain) Andorra	ACB	27	23.2	.460	.333	.817	2.1	1.3	.7	.0	15.5
2024–25	(Spain) Andorra	ACB	30	26.4	.486	.371	.882	2.2	1.8	1.1	.2	20.0

=== College ===
Year	Team	GP	GS	MPG	FG%	3P%	FT%	RPG	APG	SPG	BPG	PPG
2016–17	Weber State	**32**	7	17.6	.497	.405	.859	1.8	.8	.6	.2	9.3
2017–18	Weber State	31	**31**	32.9	**.530**	**.425**	**.882**	**3.4**	1.7	1.1	.2	22.0
2018–19	Weber State	30	29	33.9	.471	.366	.870	**3.4**	1.4	**1.7**	**.4**	21.4
2019–20	Weber State	29	28	**34.0**	.488	.328	.863	2.9	**2.2**	1.0	.1	**22.2**
Career		122	95	29.4	.497	.372	.869	2.9	1.5	1.1	.2	18.6
