= Marcelinho Huertas =

Brazilian basketball player (born 1983)

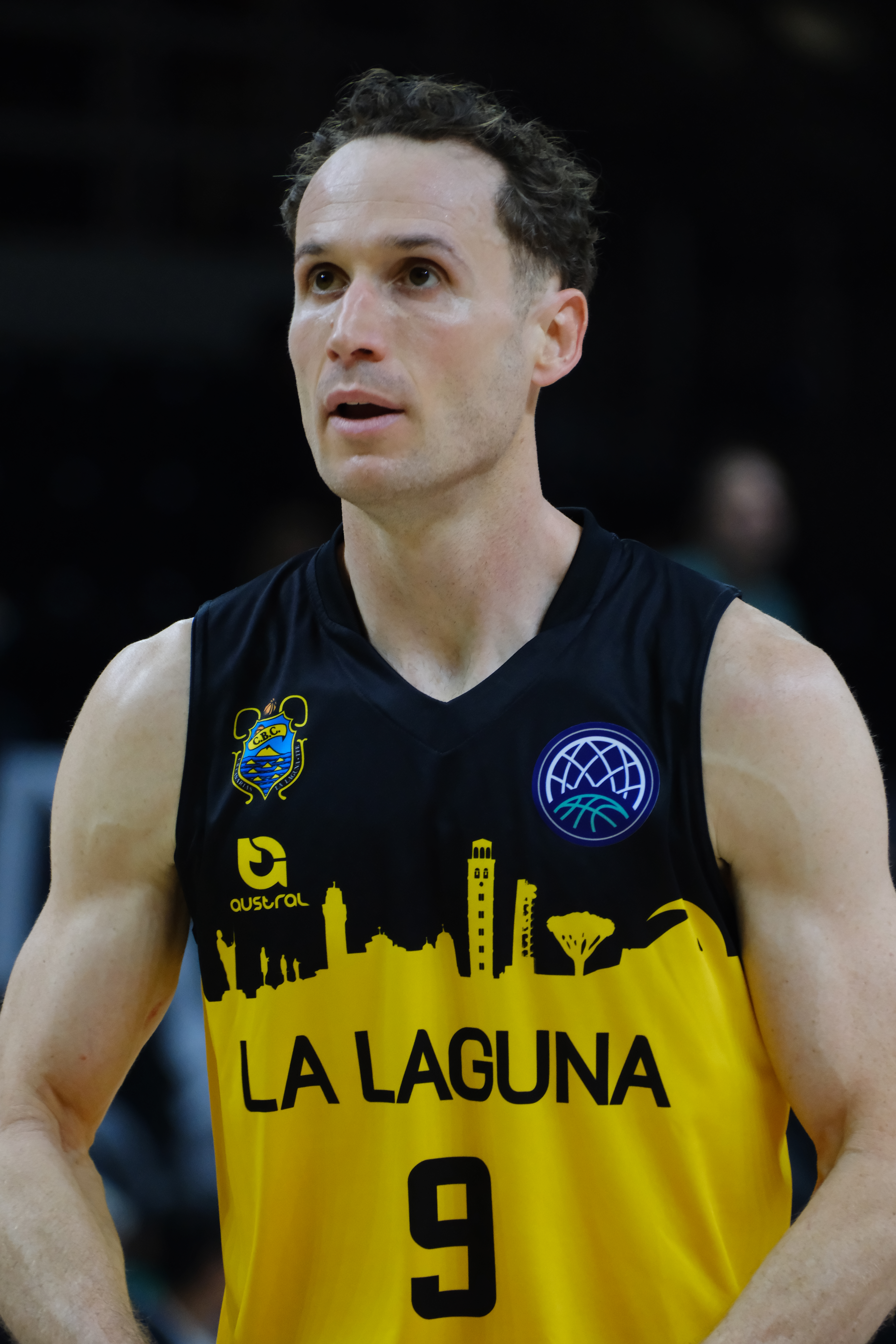
- Huertas with Tenerife in 2025

No. 9 – Dubai Basketball
- Position: Point guard
- League: ABA League; EuroLeague

Personal information
- Born: 25 May 1983 (age 43) São Paulo, Brazil
- Listed height: 1.91 m (6 ft 3 in)
- Listed weight: 93 kg (205 lb)

Career information
- High school: Coppell (Coppell, Texas)
- NBA draft: 2005: undrafted
- Playing career: 2001–present

Career history
- 2001–2002: FMU São Paulo
- 2002–2003: Pinheiros
- 2003–2004: FMU São Paulo
- 2004–2008: Joventut Badalona
- 2007–2008: →Bilbao
- 2008–2009: Fortitudo Bologna
- 2009–2011: Baskonia
- 2011–2015: FC Barcelona
- 2015–2017: Los Angeles Lakers
- 2017–2019: Baskonia
- 2019–2026: Tenerife
- 2026–present: Dubai Basketball

Career highlights
- 2× FIBA Intercontinental Cup champion (2020, 2023); FIBA Intercontinental Cup MVP (2020); FIBA Champions League champion (2022); 2× FIBA Champions League MVP (2024, 2025); FIBA Champions League Final Four MVP (2022); 4× All-FIBA Champions League First Team (2020, 2023–2025); 2× All-FIBA Champions League Second Team (2022, 2026); FIBA Champions League assists leader (2020); FIBA Champions League All-Decade First Team (2026); FIBA EuroCup champion (2006); 3× Liga ACB champion (2010, 2012, 2014); Spanish Cup winner (2013); Spanish Supercup winner (2011); Liga ACB MVP (2025); 6× All-Liga ACB First Team (2008, 2011, 2020–2022, 2025); 3× All-Liga ACB Second Team (2023, 2024, 2026); 5× Liga ACB assists leader (2011, 2020, 2024–2026); 3× Liga ACB Best Latin American Player (2020–2022); Liga ACB Free Throw Percentage leader (2020); FIBA South American Championship MVP (2006); NBB Breakthrough Player (2003); Liga ACB career stats leaders: Liga ACB all-time leader in assists
- Stats at NBA.com
- Stats at Basketball Reference
Medals
Men’s basketball
Representing Brazil
FIBA AmeriCup
Gold medal – first place	2005 Santo Domingo
Gold medal – first place	2009 San Juan
Silver medal – second place	2011 Mar del Plata
Silver medal – second place	2022 Brazil
Pan American Games
Gold medal – first place	2007 Rio de Janeiro
FIBA South American Championship
Gold medal – first place	2006 Caracas

Marcelo "Marcelinho" Tieppo Huertas (born 25 May 1983) is a Brazilian professional basketball player for Dubai Basketball of the ABA League and the EuroLeague. He has represented the Brazilian national basketball team in international competitions and also holds Italian citizenship.

At 32 years old, Huertas was the second oldest rookie in NBA history after Pablo Prigioni and before Andre Ingram. After signing with the Los Angeles Lakers in 2015, he played one and a half seasons before returning to Spain in 2017. In 2025, Huertas won the Liga ACB MVP award at 42 years of age.

== Professional career ==
=== Early years in Brazil and Texas ===
Huertas began his career playing with the youth basketball teams of the multi-sports club E.C. Pinheiros in Brazil. After playing high school basketball at Coppell High School in Coppell, Texas, he made his senior men's team debut in the 2001–02 season, with the senior men's team of FMU São Paulo. He then moved to the senior men's basketball team of E.C. Pinheiros, for the 2002–03 season, where he played in the top Brazilian League. He then returned to FMU São Paulo for the 2003–04 season.

=== Joventut Badalona (2004–2007) ===
Huertas joined the Liga ACB club DKV Joventut in 2004, playing for the Badalona-based team for three seasons until 2007. On October 2, 2004, Huertas made his debut with the Catalans in a game against Lleida Bàsquet, scoring 9 points and recording 3 assists. With Joventut, Huertas reached the Liga ACB Playoffs for three consecutive seasons, won the 2005-06 FIBA EuroCup and played in the 2006–07 Euroleague.

==== Loan to Bilbao (2007–2008) ====
Still in contract with Joventut, Huertas was loaned to Bilbao Basket of the Liga ACB for the 2007-08 season. With Bilbao, Huertas received his first All-Liga ACB Team mention.

=== Fortitudo Bologna (2008–2009) ===
After rumors of a return to Joventut or a contract extension with Bilbao, Huertas finally signed with Fortitudo Bologna of the Lega Basket Serie A, playing for the Italians during the 2008–09 season.

=== Baskonia (2009–2011) ===
In August 2009, Huertas signed a three-year contract with the Liga ACB club Baskonia. He played for two seasons with the Basque team, winning the 2009-10 Liga ACB and reaching the EuroLeague quarterfinals in both seasons.

=== FC Barcelona (2011–2015) ===
On 9 August 2011, he signed a four-year contract with Liga ACB and EuroLeague club FC Barcelona. Barcelona paid Baskonia 500,000 euros for the transfer. With Barcelona, Huertas won the Liga ACB twice (2012 and 2014) and won the 2013 Spanish Cup. He also helped the Catalans reach the EuroLeague Final Four for three consecutive years.

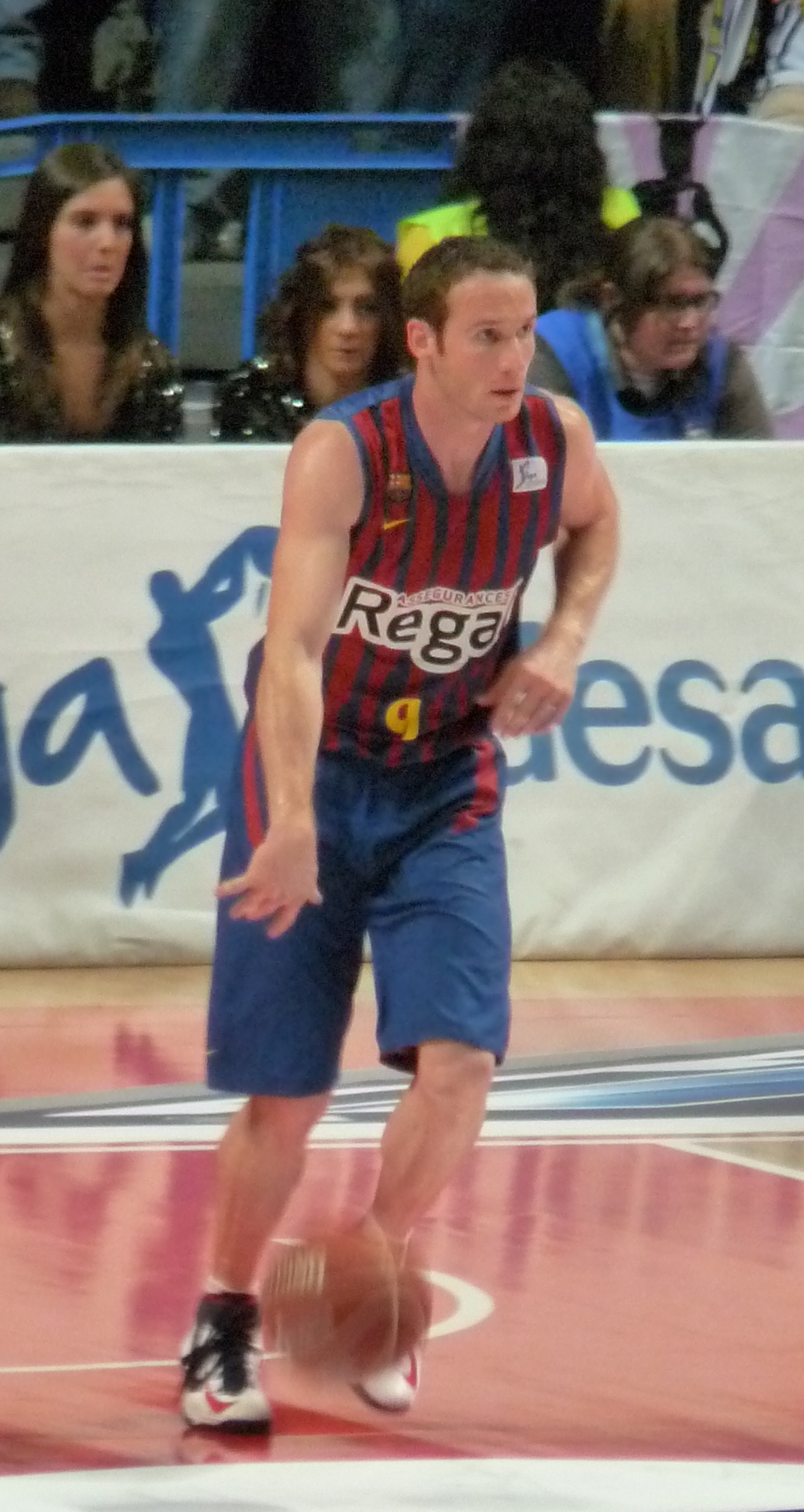
Huertas playing for Barcelona in 2013

Huertas became a key player in the team's rotation in his first season, leading the team in assists throughout the 2011-12 season and helping win the Spanish Supercup. In the first game of the 2012 ACB Finals, Huertas scored a three-point buzzer beater from half-court to seal the first win in a series in which the Catalans would take the title against rivals Real Madrid.

Huertas would again be instrumental in the 2013-14 Liga ACB win, playing 40 minutes and scoring the game-winning shot in a key semifinal game against Valencia Basket.

=== Los Angeles Lakers (2015–2017) ===
On 9 September 2015, Huertas signed with the Los Angeles Lakers. He made his debut for the Lakers in the team's season opener against the Minnesota Timberwolves on 28 October, recording 2 points, 2 rebounds, and 2 assists in a 112–111 loss. On 6 March 2016, he recorded season-highs of 10 points and 9 assists in a 112–95 win over the Golden State Warriors. Four days later, he had a season-best game with 13 points and 5 assists in a 120–108 loss to the Cleveland Cavaliers.

On 5 August 2016, Huertas re-signed with the Lakers. On 23 February 2017, Huertas was traded to the Houston Rockets in exchange for Tyler Ennis. Upon being acquired by the Rockets, Huertas was waived by the team.

=== Return to Baskonia (2017–2019) ===
On 25 July 2017, Huertas signed a two-year deal with Baskonia, returning to the team he left in 2011. In the 2017-18 season Huertas reached the Liga ACB Finals, which Baskonia would ultimately lose to Real Madrid. During both seasons with Baskonia, Huertas reached the EuroLeague playoffs.

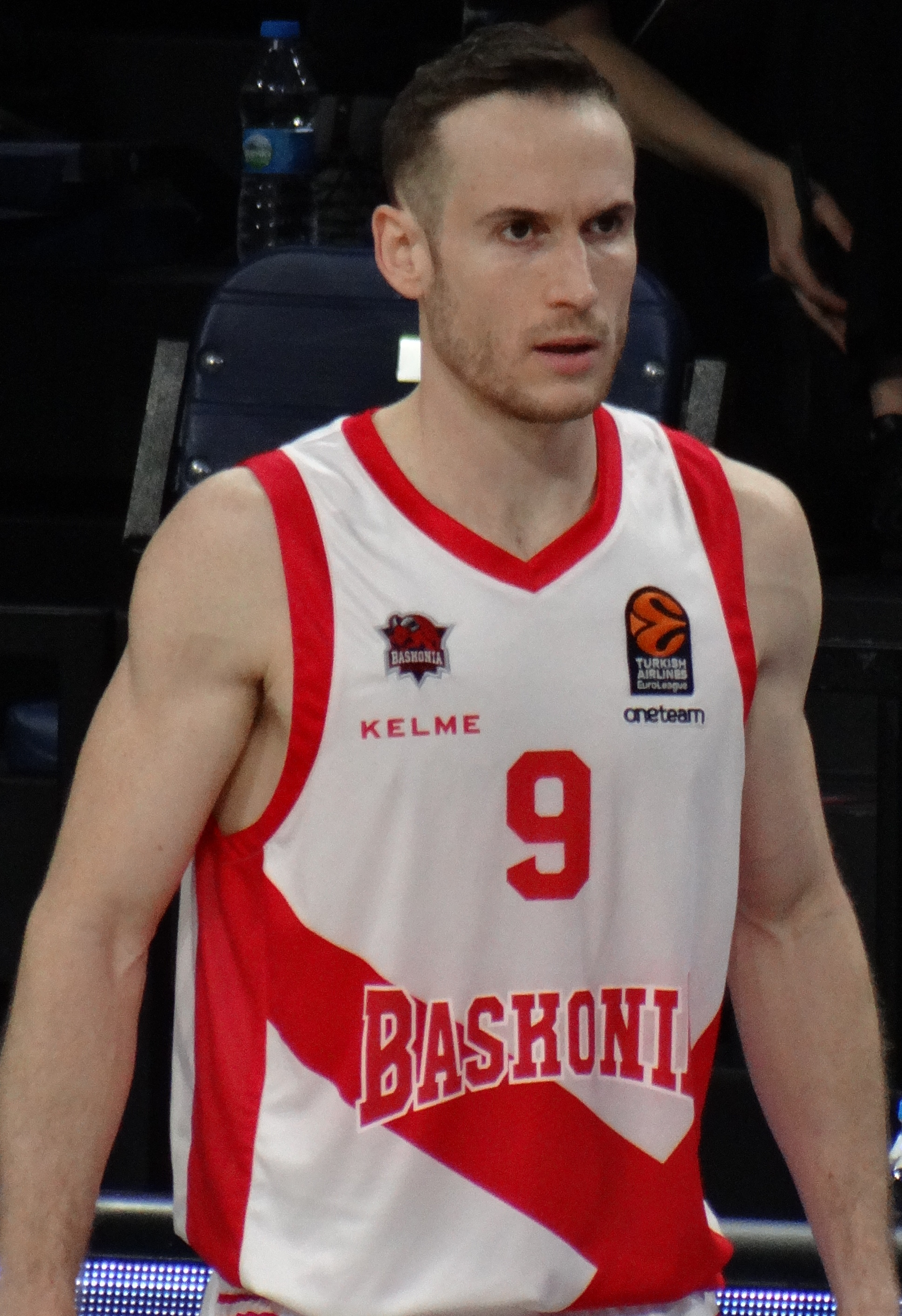
Huertas with Baskonia in 2017

Huertas' second stint at Baskonia ended in June 2019 having played 142 games over two seasons and averaging 7.8 points per game and 5 assists during the second season. During his two spells with the Vitoria-Gasteiz-based team, he played 260 official games.

=== Canarias (2019–2026) ===
On 23 July 2019, Huertas signed a two-year deal with CB Canarias (known as Iberostar Tenerife for sponsorship reasons). He averaged 12.9 points and 8.3 assists per game in his debut season for Canarias. Huertas re-signed with the team on 4 June 2020.

Huertas became a star player for the team, and he was named to the All-Basketball Champions League First Team in 2020, before winning the 2021-22 Basketball Champions League and being named Final Four MVP. Continuing to play a key role in Tenerife's performances in the Basketball Champions League every season, Huertas won two back to back Basketball Champions League MVP awards (in 2024 and 2025). He also won the 2020 and 2023 FIBA Intercontinental Cup titles, gathering MVP honours in the first win.

In his 18th season in the Liga ACB, the 2024-25 season, Huertas won the ACB Most Valuable Player award, in addition to being named to the All-Liga ACB First Team for the fifth time. Huertas had turned 42 just prior to earning the award.

On 30 June 2026, Huertas re–signed with Tenerife for his eighth consecutive season with the team. On 11 November 2026, Huertas and Tenerife mutually agreed to part ways.

=== Dubai Basketball (2026–present) ===
On 16 November 2026, Huertas signed with Dubai Basketball of the ABA League and the EuroLeague until the end of the season.

== National team career ==
Huertas has been a member of the senior men's Brazilian national basketball team. With Brazil's senior national team, he won the gold medal at the 2005 FIBA Americas Championship, the 2006 South American Championship, the 2007 Pan American Games, and the 2009 FIBA Americas Championship. He also won the silver medal at the 2011 FIBA Americas Championship.

He also played at the following tournaments: the 2006 FIBA World Championship, the 2010 FIBA World Championship, the 2012 Summer Olympics, the 2013 FIBA Americas Championship, the 2014 FIBA Basketball World Cup, the 2016 Summer Olympics, the 2019 FIBA World Championship, the 2023 FIBA Basketball World Cup, and the 2024 Summer Olympics.

== Career statistics ==
Legend
GP	Games played	GS	Games started	MPG	Minutes per game
FG%	Field-goal percentage	3P%	3-point field-goal percentage	FT%	Free-throw percentage
RPG	Rebounds per game	APG	Assists per game	SPG	Steals per game
BPG	Blocks per game	PPG	Points per game	PIR	Performance index rating
**Bold**	Career high

=== NBA ===
==== Regular season ====
Year	Team	GP	GS	MPG	FG%	3P%	FT%	RPG	APG	SPG	BPG	PPG
2015–16	L.A. Lakers	**53**	0	**16.4**	**.422**	**.262**	**.931**	**1.7**	**3.4**	**.5**	**.1**	**4.5**
2016–17	L.A. Lakers	23	**1**	10.3	.368	.211	.529	1.0	2.3	.4	**.1**	2.7
Career		76	1	14.6	.409	.250	.783	1.5	3.1	.5	.1	3.9

=== EuroLeague ===
*	Led the league

Year	Team	GP	GS	MPG	FG%	3P%	FT%	RPG	APG	SPG	BPG	PPG	PIR
2006–07	Badalona	20	3	14.6	.377	.167	.875	1.5	1.4	.9	—	5.3	4.3
2009–10	Baskonia	16	1	20.9	**.526**	.308	.852	1.8	3.9	.6	—	8.3	9.4
2010–11	Baskonia	20	14	**28.6**	.460	**.442**	.865	**3.0**	**5.5**	.8	**.1**	**10.3**	**13.9**
2011–12	FC Barcelona	21	21*	23.7	.504	.439	.867	2.0	4.4	**1.0**	—	8.5	10.7
2012–13	FC Barcelona	31*	17	20.5	.416	.347	**.972***	2.2	3.4	.6	.0	8.0	8.7
2013–14	FC Barcelona	29	**29**	21.5	.492	.338	.811	2.0	3.8	.4	.0	8.2	9.5
2014–15	FC Barcelona	28	16	22.1	.403	.365	.833	2.3	4.4	.5	.0	7.6	8.5
2017–18	Baskonia	29	11	16.6	.414	.432	.921	1.0	3.6	.1	—	5.9	6.2
2018–19	Baskonia	**34**	15	19.5	.495	.421	.884	1.5	4.7	.7	—	7.8	8.6
Career		228	127	20.5	.452	.371	.877	1.9	3.9	.6	.0	7.7	8.8

=== EuroCup ===
Year	Team	GP	GS	MPG	FG%	3P%	FT%	RPG	APG	SPG	BPG	PPG	PIR
2004–05	Badalona	**12**	1	15.5	.452	.400	.727	.9	2.2	1.1	**.1**	5.8	5.6
2008–09	Bologna	6	**5**	**24.2**	**.560**	**.455**	**.900**	**2.5**	**2.7**	**1.7**	-	**8.7**	**10.2**
Career		18	6	18.4	.493	.419	.810	1.4	2.4	1.3	.1	6.8	7.1

=== Domestic leagues ===
==== Regular season ====
†	Denotes season in which Huertas won the Liga ACB championship
*	Led the league

Year	Team	League	GP	MPG	FG%	3P%	FT%	RPG	APG	SPG	BPG	PPG
2004–05	(Spain) Joventut Badalona	ACB	34	17.6	.452	.298	.704	1.4	2.3	.8	.0	7.1
2005–06	(Spain) Joventut Badalona	ACB	31	15.0	.460	.444	.919	1.2	2.4	1.1	.0	7.0
2006–07	(Spain) Joventut Badalona	ACB	34	12.4	.372	.273	.897	.8	1.4	.5	.0	5.1
2007–08	(Spain) Bilbao Basket	ACB	34	26.6	.451	.235	.865	2.7	3.9	1.6	.0	14.6
2008–09	(Italy) Fortitudo Bologna	LBA	29	27.0	.478	.246	.838	2.6	2.4	1.1	.0	10.1
2009–10†	(Spain) Baskonia	ACB	27	24.3	.507	.475	.828	3.2	4.9	1.0	.0	8.0
2010–11	(Spain) Baskonia	ACB	34	28.4	.500	.405	.877	2.9	**5.9***	.8	.0	9.7
2011–12†	(Spain) FC Barcelona	ACB	34	22.5	.454	.410	.854	2.7	3.3	1.1	.0	8.0
2012–13	(Spain) Barcelona	ACB	34	21.2	.433	.410	.871	2.3	3.7	.9	.0	9.1
2013–14†	(Spain) Barcelona	ACB	33	21.2	.486	.360	.971	2.0	4.3	.6	.0	8.5
2014–15	(Spain) Barcelona	ACB	34	21.3	.479	.333	.871	2.2	4.6	.7	.0	7.7
2017–18	(Spain) Baskonia	ACB	32	19.8	.457	.342	.875	2.1	4.5	.4	.0	7.3
2018–19	(Spain) Baskonia	ACB	32	19.6	.497	.382	.970	2.0	5.0	.7	.0	7.8
2019–20	(Spain) Tenerife	ACB	22	28.1	.465	.313	**.981***	2.5	**8.1***	1.0	.0	13.1
2020–21	(Spain) Tenerife	ACB	35	25.1	.513	.421	.925	2.0	6.1	.7	.0	14.2
2021–22	(Spain) Tenerife	ACB	34	23.6	.464	.286	.902	2.1	6.3	.7	.0	12.6
2022–23	(Spain) Tenerife	ACB	33	22.3	.508	.316	.824	1.19	5.8	.7	.0	11.8
2023–24	(Spain) Tenerife	ACB	34	25.4	.492	.376	**.910***	2.4	**6.4***	.7	.0	14.2
2024–25	(Spain) Tenerife	ACB	33	23.9	.503	.349	.915	2.1	**7.1***	.5	.0	14.3

== Honors ==
Joventut Badalona

- FIBA EuroCup: 2005–06

Baskonia

- Spanish League: 2009–10

FC Barcelona

- Spanish League: 2011–12, 2013–14
- Spanish Cup: 2013
- Spanish SuperCup: 2011

Canarias

- FIBA Intercontinental Cup: 2020, 2023
- Basketball Champions League: 2022

== Individual awards ==
- Brazilian League Breakthrough Player: (2003)
- 5× All-Spanish League First Team: (2008, 2011, 2021, 2022, 2025)
- 2× All-Spanish League Second Team: (2020, 2023)
- FIBA AmeriCup All-Tournament Team: (2011)
- FIBA Intercontinental Cup MVP: (2020)
- 4× Basketball Champions League Star Lineup: (2020, 2023, 2024, 2025)
- Basketball Champions League Final Four MVP: (2022)
- Basketball Champions League MVP: (2024, 2025)
- Liga ACB Best Latin American Player of the Year: (2019–2020), (2020–2021)
- Liga ACB MVP: (2025)
