= Brancou Badio =

Senegalese basketball player

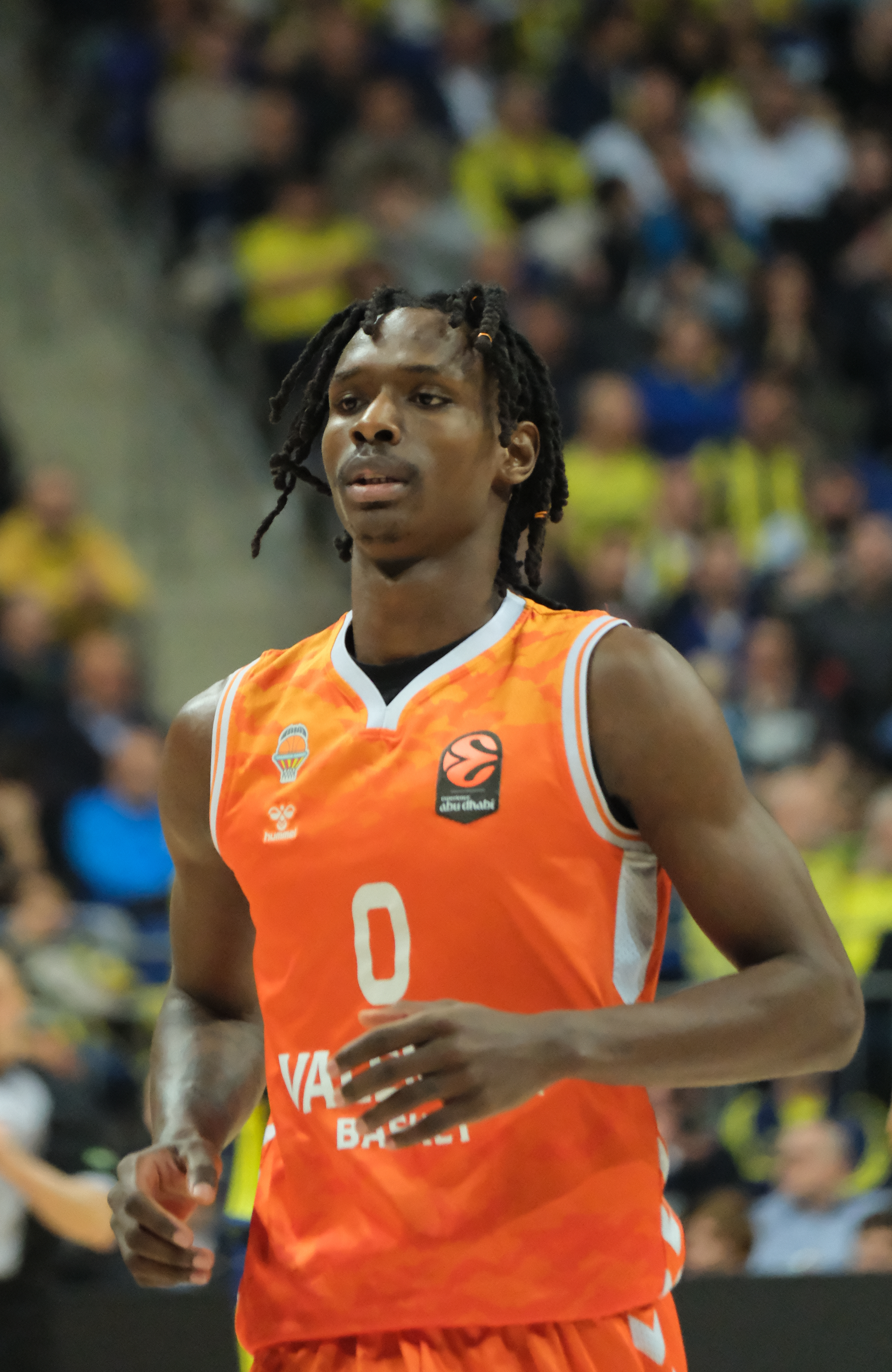
- Badio with Valencia Basket in 2026

No. 7 – Panathinaikos
- Position: Shooting guard
- League: Greek Basketball League; EuroLeague

Personal information
- Born: 17 February 1999 (age 27) Rufisque, Senegal
- Listed height: 1.93 m (6 ft 4 in)
- Listed weight: 187 lb (85 kg)

Career information
- Playing career: 2019–present

Career history
- 2019–2021: FC Barcelona
- 2019–2021: →FC Barcelona B
- 2021–2022: Skyliners Frankfurt
- 2022–2024: Manresa
- 2024–2026: Valencia
- 2026–present: Panathinaikos

Career highlights
- Liga ACB champion (2026); Spanish Supercup winner (2025); All-Liga ACB Second Team (2024)
Medals
Men's basketball
Representing Senegal
AfroBasket
| Bronze medal – third place | 2021 Rwanda |
| Bronze medal – third place | 2025 Angola |

El Hadji Omar Brancou Badio (born 17 February 1999), nicknamed "Papi", is a Senegalese professional basketball player for Panathinaikos of the Greek Basketball League (GBL) and the EuroLeague. He also plays for the Senegal national team, who he helped win two AfroBasket bronze medals.

== Early life and career ==
Badio was born in Rufisque, Senegal and played for Saltigué in his hometown, competing at the senior level by the age of 15. His older sister Marietou had played for Saltigué. He was named Revelation Player of his league in 2018. Badio moved to Spain to join Canarias Basketball Academy and played for its affiliated team La Matanza in the Liga EBA.

== Professional career ==
For the 2019–20 season, Badio signed with FC Barcelona. He averaged 13.4 points per game while shooting 40 percent from three-point range for the club's reserve team in the LEB Plata. He declared for the 2020 NBA draft. On 20 September 2020, Badio made his senior debut for Barcelona, scoring three points in seven minutes in an 89–86 win over San Pablo Burgos.

On 24 September 2021, Badio signed a one-year contract with German club Skyliners Frankfurt, with the option for another season. He averaged 10.6 points, 2.3 rebounds and 3 assists in 26 minutes per game for the Skyliners.

On 10 May 2022, Badio returned to Spain when he signed with Manresa for the remainder of the 2021–22 season.

On June 29, 2024, he signed a three-year contract with Valencia of the Spanish Liga ACB. On April 14, 2026, Badio signed a contract extension until the end of the 2028–2029 season.

On July 9, 2026, Badio signed a three-year contract with European powerhouse Panathinaikos of the Greek Basketball League (GBL) and the EuroLeague.

== National team career ==
Badio played four games for the Senegal national team during 2019 FIBA Basketball World Cup qualification. Badio also played at AfroBasket 2021, where Senegal won bronze and he averaged 17.3 points and 5.5 assists as the team's starting point guard. At AfroBasket 2025, Badio was crucial in helping the team reach the semi-finals, after scoring 32 poitns in the quarterfinal win against Nigeria. Senegal finished with a second straight bronze medal, while Badio was named to the All-Tournament Team and was named the AfroBasket Top Scorer.
