= Giorgi Shermadini =

Georgian basketball player (born 1989)

Giorgi Shermadini გიორგი შერმადინი
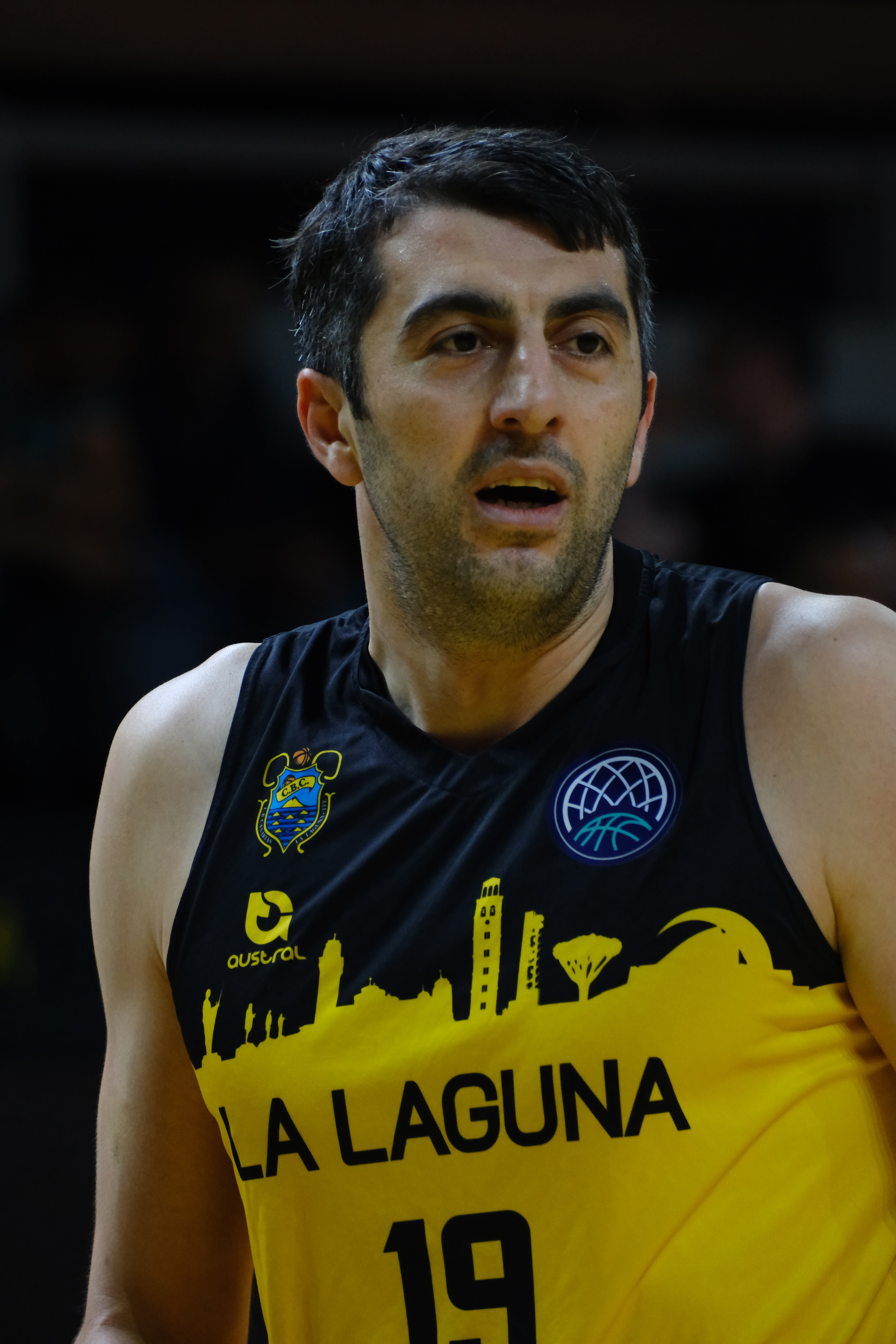
- Shermadini with Canarias in 2025

No. 19 – La Laguna Tenerife
- Position: Center
- League: Liga ACB

Personal information
- Born: 2 April 1989 (age 37) Natakhtari, Georgian SSR, Soviet Union
- Listed height: 7 ft 1.5 in (2.17 m)
- Listed weight: 265 lb (120 kg)

Career information
- NBA draft: 2008: undrafted
- Playing career: 2005–present

Career history
- 2005–2008: Maccabi Tbilisi
- 2008–2011: Panathinaikos
- 2010–2011: →Union Olimpija
- 2011–2012: Pallacanestro Cantù
- 2012: Maccabi Tel Aviv
- 2012–2013: Olympiacos
- 2013: Zaragoza
- 2014: Olympiacos
- 2014: Zaragoza
- 2014–2015: Pallacanestro Cantù
- 2015–2017: Andorra
- 2017–2019: Unicaja Malaga
- 2019–present: Tenerife

Career highlights
- 2× EuroLeague champion (2009, 2013); 2× FIBA Intercontinental Cup champion (2020, 2023); FIBA Champions League champion (2022); 4× All-FIBA Champions League First Team (2020–2022, 2026); All-FIBA Champions League Second Team (2023); FIBA Champions League All-Decade First Team (2026); 2× Liga ACB MVP (2021, 2023); 6x All-Liga ACB First Team (2017, 2020–2024); 2× All-Liga ACB Second Team (2025, 2026); Liga ACB Top Scorer (2021); Greek League champion (2009); Greek Cup winner (2009)

Giorgi Shermadini (Georgian: გიორგი შერმადინი; born 2 April 1989) is a Georgian professional basketball player for La Laguna Tenerife of the Spanish Liga ACB. He was born in the village of Natakhtari, Georgia on April 2, 1989. He is 2.17 metres (7 ft 1.4 in) tall, and he plays at the center position.

== Early career ==
In the 2004–05 season, Shermadini was the top scorer of the Georgian Youth League. His highest point total in one game was 89 points scored against the Sokhumi State University team, and he also had a 76-point, 16 rebound, and 6 assist game as well. He also had a 52-point game, a 54-point game, and another game, where he scored 60 points, grabbed 17 rebounds, and dished out 7 assists. He also participated in the Adidas Superstar Camp. His performance at the Adidas Superstar Camp earned him a selection to the World All-Star Team. In January 2005, he had his first practice with Maccabi Tbilisi's Junior Team.

== Professional career ==
Shermadini started playing basketball professionally when he was 16 years old, on the senior men's Georgian basketball team, Maccabi Tbilisi. In his first season in the Georgian Super League, during the 2005–06 season, he averaged 28.5 points per game, 14.7 rebounds per game, 2.8 assists per game, 3.0 blocks per game, and 1.2 steals per game, at the age of 17. Following the 2005–06 season, Shermadini was invited to the "Basketball Without Borders" (BWB) Europe camp, conducted at Vilnius, Lithuania, from June 30 to July 3. During the 2006–07 season, at 18 years old, he averaged the highest points per game ever in the Georgian Super League. He averaged 35.1 points per game, 16.4 rebounds per game, 4.7 assists per game, 3.4 blocks per game, and 2.6 steals per game. This included a game where he scored 60 points, grabbed 17 rebounds, and dished out 6 assists. During the 2007–08 season, at the age of 19, he averaged 33.5 points per game, 18.4 rebounds per game, 4.8 assists per game, 3.2 blocks per game, and 2.3 steals per game, in the Georgian Super League.

In April 2007, Shermadini was invited to the "Nike Hoop Summit" World Select Team. Unfortunately, he did not play with the World Select Team, due to an injury to his meniscus, which required surgery. He declared as an early-entry candidate for the NBA draft in 2008, but he failed to be selected in the 2008 NBA draft, as some concerns still remained among NBA scouts over his injury.

Shermadini signed with the EuroLeague giants, the Greek League club Panathinaikos, in 2008. He debuted on 29 November 2008, in the game against Egaleo, playing for 6 minutes, and scoring 4 points. His EuroLeague debut came on 17 December 2008, playing for 10 minutes, and scoring 1 point against SLUC Nancy. His next game came in the Greek League, on 15 February 2009, against Trikala 2000. He scored 9 points (a personal high for him to that date while at Panathinaikos), with two dunks and 5/5 free throws. He surpassed his personal best again, although playing only for 12 minutes, by scoring 13 points in a home game against Union Kavala-Panorama, on 15 April 2009.

In October 2010, he was sent by Panathinaikos, on a one-year loan, to Union Olimpija of the Adriatic League. In October 2011, he was again loaned by Panathinaikos, this time to the Italian league club Cantù. In June 2012, he signed a two-year deal with the Israeli Super League club Maccabi Tel Aviv.

In December 2012, he signed a deal with the Greek League club Olympiacos. With Olympiacos, he won the 2012–13 season championship of the EuroLeague. In the summer of 2013, he signed with CAI Zaragoza of the Spanish League. He left the team in February 2014, in order to come back to Olympiacos. On August 9, 2015, he signed with MoraBanc Andorra.

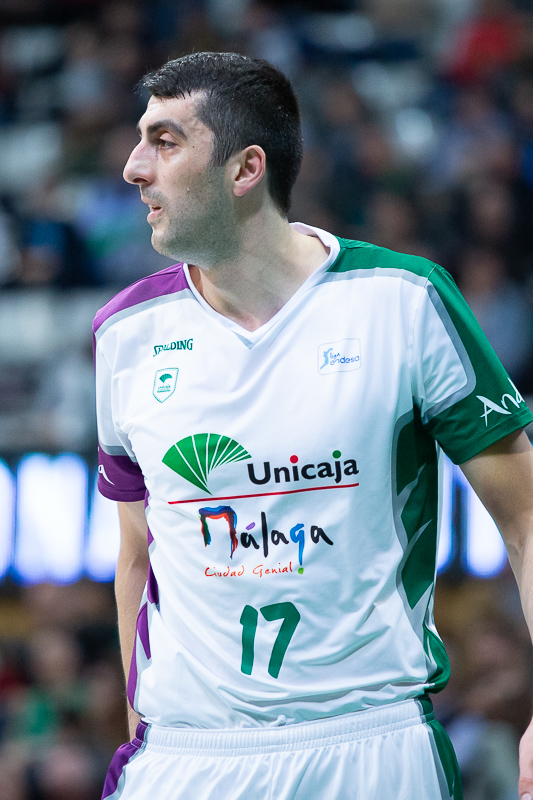
Shermadini with Unicaja Málaga in 2018

On July 9, 2019, Shermadini signed with the Spanish club Tenerife. He averaged 18.3 points and 7.3 rebounds per game during the 2019–20 season. On May 27, 2020, he signed a three-year extension with the club. On May 26, 2021, Shermadini was named the Most Valuable Player of the 2020–21 ACB season after averaging 17.0 points, 5.4 rebounds and a PIR of 22.5.

== National team career ==
=== Georgian junior national team ===
In June 2005, despite his brief playing experience, Shermadini was selected to the Under-16 Junior National Team of Georgia, and he played at the Youth Olympic Games, in Moscow. Later in 2005, he played at the 2005 FIBA Europe Under-16 Championship, in Bulgaria.

Following his surgery and rehabilitation, for his meniscus injury that he suffered in 2007; he was invited to the Under-20 Junior National Team of Georgia. At 18 years old, he played at the 2007 FIBA Europe Under-20 Championship, in Nova Gorica, Slovenia. Despite playing at much less than full strength, due to his recent surgery and rehabilitation, he was the top scorer on the Georgian Under-20 National Team, averaging 12.5 points per game, 7.4 rebounds per game, and 1.5 assists per game, in 23.8 minutes played per game. He was also the second-leading shot blocker in the Under-20 European Championship, averaging 2.1 blocked shots per game. At the 2008 FIBA Europe Under-20 Championship, Shermadini shot 74% from the field, averaged 21.5 points per game, 10.5 rebounds per game, 1.2 assists per game, and 3.7 blocks per game.

=== Georgian senior national team ===
In August 2006, Shermadini was the youngest player ever selected to the senior men's Georgian national basketball team, when he made the men's senior national team at the age of just 17. He played alongside teammates, Zaza Pachulia (Atlanta Hawks), Nikoloz Tskitishvili (Teramo Basket), Shammond Williams (Valencia), Viktor Sanikidze (Tartu Ülikool/Rock), Manu Markoishvili (Olimpija Ljubljana), and Vladimir Boisa (Menorca Bàsquet).

With the Georgia's senior national team, he played at the 2013 EuroBasket and the 2017 EuroBasket.

In February 2023, Shermadini was on there roster that made Georgia qualify for its first-ever World Cup in 2023.

== Career statistics ==
Legend
GP	Games played	GS	Games started	MPG	Minutes per game
FG%	Field-goal percentage	3P%	3-point field-goal percentage	FT%	Free-throw percentage
RPG	Rebounds per game	APG	Assists per game	SPG	Steals per game
BPG	Blocks per game	PPG	Points per game	PIR	Performance index rating
**Bold**	Career high

=== EuroLeague ===
†	Denotes seasons in which Shermadini won the EuroLeague

Year	Team	GP	GS	MPG	FG%	3P%	FT%	RPG	APG	SPG	BPG	PPG	PIR
2008–09†	Panathinaikos	1	0	10.0	.000	.000	.500	1.0	—	**1.0**	1.0	1.0	-4.0
2009–10	Panathinaikos	12	0	9.2	**.667**	.000	.750	2.2	—	.5	.3	4.5	4.8
2010–11	Olimpija	16	2	15.6	**.667**	.000	**.848**	3.4	.5	.3	**1.1**	7.4	10.1
2011–12	Cantù	16	2	**21.6**	.564	—	.841	**5.5**	**.8**	.5	.6	**10.9**	**15.3**
2012–13†	Maccabi	9	2	9.7	.520	—	.630	2.3	.1	—	.2	4.8	5.0
2012–13†	Olympiacos	17	6	10.5	.568	—	.750	2.9	.4	.4	.7	4.4	6.1
2013–14	Olympiacos	9	6	14.0	.600	—	.778	3.6	.4	—	—	5.7	7.6
2017–18	Málaga	**23**	**10**	14.4	.470	.000	.747	3.5	.5	.3	.5	6.5	8.0
Career		103	28	14.0	.557	.000	.778	3.4	.4	.3	.6	6.5	8.3

== Awards and accomplishments ==
- Adidas Superstar Camp World All-Star Team: (2005)
- 3× Eurobasket.com website's Georgian League Player of the Year: (2006, 2007, 2008)
- Nike Hoop Summit World Select Team: (2007)
- Greek Cup Winner: (2009)
- Greek League Champion: (2009)
- 2× EuroLeague Champion: (2009, 2013)
- Triple Crown Champion: (2009)
- All-Liga ACB First Team: (2017)
- Spanish League MVP: (2021)
- FIBA Intercontinental Cup: (2020, 2023)
