= Ante Tomić (basketball) =

Croatian professional basketball player (born 1987)

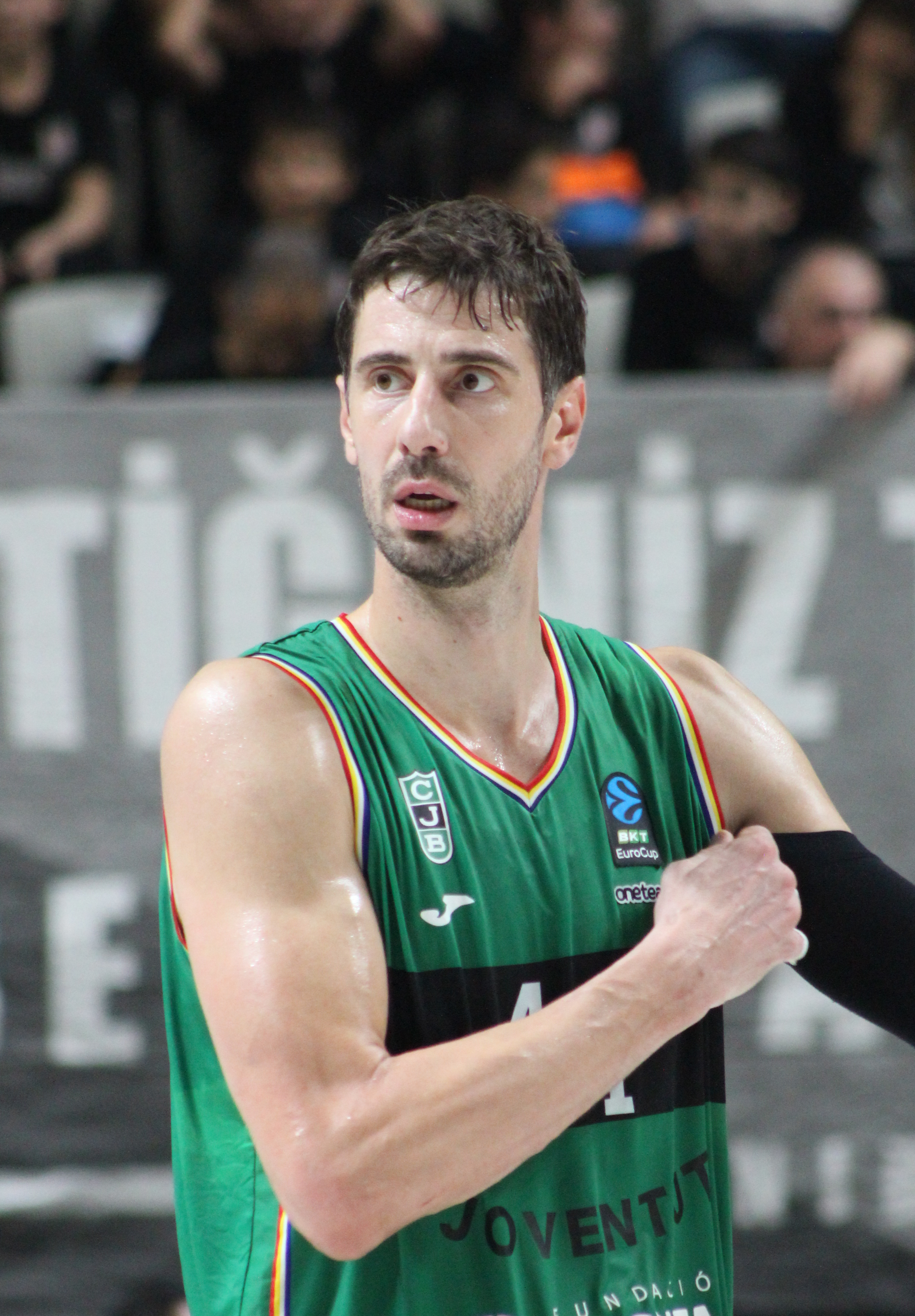
- Tomić during a game with Joventut Badalona in 2024

No. 44 – Joventut Badalona
- Position: Center
- League: Liga ACB

Personal information
- Born: 17 February 1987 (age 39) Dubrovnik, SR Croatia, Yugoslavia
- Listed height: 2.18 m (7 ft 2 in)
- Listed weight: 118 kg (260 lb)

Career information
- NBA draft: 2008: 2nd round, 44th overall pick
- Drafted by: Utah Jazz
- Playing career: 2004–present

Career history
- 2004–2010: Zagreb
- 2010–2012: Real Madrid
- 2012–2020: FC Barcelona
- 2020–present: Joventut

Career highlights
- 2× All-EuroLeague First Team (2013, 2014); All-EuroLeague Second Team (2015); All-EuroCup First Team (2023); Liga ACB champion (2014); 4× Spanish Cup winner (2012, 2013, 2018, 2019); Croatian Cup winner (2008); ABA League MVP (2009); 5× All-Liga ACB First Team (2011, 2013, 2017, 2018, 2025); All-Liga ACB Second Team (2023)
- Stats at Basketball Reference
Medals
Men's basketball
Representing Croatia
Mediterranean Games
Gold medal – first place	2009 Italy

Ante Tomić (born 17 February 1987) is a Croatian professional basketball player for Joventut Badalona of the Spanish Liga ACB. He has also represented the senior Croatian national team in international competitions. Standing at 2.18 m (7 ft 2 in), he plays the center position and is a three-time All-EuroLeague Team selection.

== Professional career ==
=== Zagreb (2004–2010) ===
Tomić started playing basketball in his native city, Dubrovnik, and in 2004 signed for Zagreb. It was in the Croatia's capital that he made his name, both at home and abroad. In Zagreb, he won the Croatian Cup (2008), and was league Adriatic League's MVP in 2009. In 2008, he was a second-round pick in the NBA Draft for Utah Jazz, but his future was in the Liga Endesa.

=== Real Madrid (2010–2012) ===
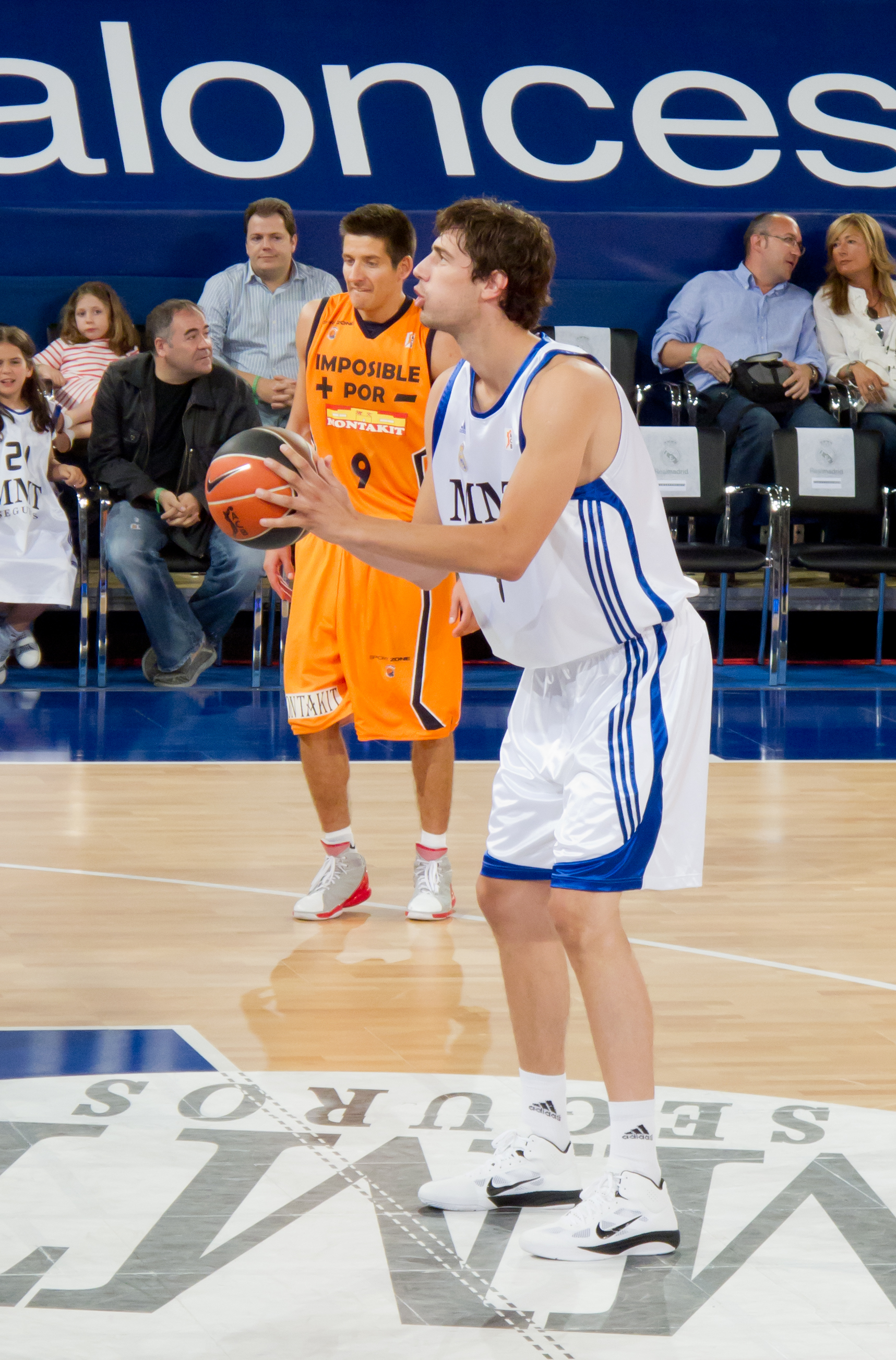
Tomić set to attempt a free throw shot with Real Madrid in the 2010–11 season, with Antonio García Ferreras behind.

In January 2010, Tomić moved to Real Madrid for three seasons. In his first season at Real Madrid, the Croatian centre played sixteen games in the regular Liga ACB season, averaging 8 points and 5.4 rebounds in a total of 348 minutes. He played in eight play-off games, averaging 9.5 points and 5.9 rebounds. His EuroLeague stats were very similar. He scored an average of 11 points per game and also had 3.6 rebounds and made 1.7 steals.

In the 2010–11 season, he played 32 ACB regular-season games, getting 10 points and four rebounds a game, in a total of 613 minutes of play. In the play-offs, in six games, he had 10 points and 5.6 rebounds. Tomić thus completed his finest Liga Endesa (ACB) season yet, and was named to the All-Liga ACB Team. In 2011–12, his team won the Copa del Rey, beating Barça Regal in the final at the Palau Sant Jordi. In the play-offs, he was on court in 12 games and collected similar stats: he left Real Madrid with 7.25 points and 6 rebounds. After the third year, the all-whites opted not to extend his contract.

=== Barcelona (2012–2020) ===
On 5 July 2012, Tomić signed with Barça Regal for three seasons, with an option for one more. In the Euroleague 2012–13 season, he was named to the All-EuroLeague First Team, and in the 2012–13 ACB season, he was included to the All-Liga ACB Team.

In March 2014, Tomić became the first player ever to receive the EuroLeague MVP of the Month award twice in a row, and even twice in the same season. In May 2014, he was named to the All-EuroLeague First Team, for the second year in a row.

On 27 April 2015, he agreed to a new tentative three-year deal with Barcelona. In May 2015, he was chosen to the All-EuroLeague Second Team for his performances over the season. Statistically, he had his best season since joining Barcelona, averaging 11.5 points, and career-highs of 7.1 rebounds and 2.3 assists per game, over 28 games played in the EuroLeague.

On 16 June 2015, he signed a three-year contract extension with Barcelona. Barcelona eventually finished the season losing in the final series of the Spanish League championship, after a 3–0 series sweep loss to Real Madrid. In June 2018 he resigned with Barcelona which was reported to be a two-year deal. On 2 July 2020, Tomić announced on his Instagram account that he was parting ways with the club after eight seasons.

=== Joventut (2020–present) ===
On 19 July 2020, Tomić signed with Joventut in Spain.

=== NBA draft rights ===
Tomić was drafted by the Utah Jazz in the second round of the 2008 NBA draft. On 18 November 2020, his draft rights were traded to the New York Knicks. On February 9, 2023, Tomić's draft rights were traded to the Portland Trail Blazers in a four-team trade involving the Knicks, Philadelphia 76ers and Charlotte Hornets.

== National team career ==
Tomić played with Croatia, at both the junior and senior levels of competition. In 2009, he won the gold medal at the Mediterranean Games in Pescara, Italy, and as a full international, he appeared in numerous competitions in which the senior Croatian national team qualified. He competed at the World Championship in Turkey, in 2010, at the EuroBasket in Lithuania, in 2011, and at the EuroBasket in Slovenia, in 2013. He also played at the 2014 FIBA World Cup, in Spain. After representing Croatia at the EuroBasket 2015, where they were eliminated in the eighth finals by the Czech Republic, he announced his retirement from national team competitions.

== Career statistics ==
Legend
GP	Games played	GS	Games started	MPG	Minutes per game
FG%	Field-goal percentage	3P%	3-point field-goal percentage	FT%	Free-throw percentage
RPG	Rebounds per game	APG	Assists per game	SPG	Steals per game
BPG	Blocks per game	PPG	Points per game	PIR	Performance index rating
**Bold**	Career high

=== EuroLeague ===
*	Led the league

Year	Team	GP	GS	MPG	FG%	3P%	FT%	RPG	APG	SPG	BPG	PPG	PIR
2009–10	Real Madrid	9	7	21.8	.616	—	.643	3.6	.9	.1	**1.1**	11.0	10.7
2010–11	Real Madrid	23*	22*	21.1	.503	—	.667	5.3	1.1	.6	.6	9.9	10.7
2011–12	Real Madrid	15	12	14.6	.543	—	.650	3.7	.7	.1	.6	6.7	6.9
2012–13	Barcelona	30	25	24.0	**.638**	.000	.607	6.5	1.7	**.7**	**1.1**	**11.7**	16.8
2013–14	Barcelona	29	28	22.4	.629	—	.667	6.4	2.1	.5	.6	**11.7**	15.8
2014–15	Barcelona	28	27	**24.2**	.609	—	.688	**7.1**	**2.3**	.6	.8	11.5	**18.0**
2015–16	Barcelona	29	22	20.3	.599	—	**.707**	5.4	1.9	.4	.2	10.3	13.9
2016–17	Barcelona	29	28	21.5	.528	.000	.495	5.9	2.0	.6	.7	8.8	13.0
2017–18	Barcelona	28	14	18.4	.621	.000	.605	4.9	1.6	.3	.3	9.7	12.8
2018–19	Barcelona	**35**	**33**	20.3	.616	—	.612	5.0	1.7	.5	.3	10.1	13.2
2019–20	Barcelona	28*	14	16.5	.581	.000	.605	4.0	1.0	.4	.3	5.7	7.5
Career		283	232	20.7	.592	.000	.632	5.5	1.7	.5	.5	9.8	13.2

=== EuroCup ===
Year	Team	GP	GS	MPG	FG%	3P%	FT%	RPG	APG	SPG	BPG	PPG	PIR
2020–21	Joventut Badalona	15	**15**	22.15	**63.6**	0.0	61.2	**5.7**	2.9	0.4	0.1	12.3	15.5
2021–22	Joventut Badalona	16	13	20.55	59.6	0.0	66.2	5.0	**3.6**	0.4	**0.3**	10.2	15.6
2022–23	Joventut Badalona	**21**	12	**23.03**	56.5	0.0	**80.5**	5.6	3.4	**0.6**	0.2	**13.7**	**17.5**
**Career**		52	40	22.1	59.3	0.0	71.2	5.4	3.3	0.5	0.2	12.2	16.3
