= 2022 ACB Playoffs =

Tournament details
- Country: Spain
- Dates: 24 May–19 June 2022
- Teams: 8
- Defending champions: Barça

Final positions
- Champions: Real Madrid; 14th ACB title 36th Spanish title
- Runner-up: Barça
- Semifinalists: Joventut; Bitci Baskonia

Tournament statistics
- Matches played: 21
- Attendance: 164,386 (7,828 per match)

The 2022 ACB Playoffs, also known as 2022 Liga Endesa Playoffs for sponsorship reasons, is the postseason tournament of the ACB's 2021–22 season, which began on 18 September 2021. The playoffs started on May 24 after the EuroLeague Final Four, which was played on May 19–21, and ended on June 19.

Barça was the defending champion, but lost the finals series 1–3 to Real Madrid, who won a record 36th title (14th in the ACB era), ending a 3-year drought after their last triumph in 2019.

== Format ==
At the end of the regular season, the eight teams with the most wins qualify for the playoffs. The seedings are based on each team's record.

The bracket is fixed; there is no reseeding. The quarterfinals are best-of-three series; the team that wins two games advances to the next round. This round is in a 1–1–1 format. From the semifinals onward, the rounds are best-of-five series; the team that wins three games advances to the next round. These rounds, including the Finals, are in a 2–2–1 format. Home court advantage in any round belong to the higher-seeded team.

== Playoff qualifying ==
On April 10, 2022, Barça became the first team to clinch a playoff spot.

Seed	Team	Record	Clinched		
Seed	Team	Record	Playoff berth	Seeded team	Top seed
1	Barça	27–7	April 10	April 27	May 7
2	Real Madrid	25–9	April 23	May 8	–
3	Valencia Basket	23–11	April 23	May 10	–
4	Joventut	22–12	April 23	May 14	–
5	Lenovo Tenerife	21–13	April 30	–	–
6	Bitci Baskonia	20–14	May 8	–	–
7	Baxi Manresa	20–14	April 24	–	–
8	Gran Canaria	17–17	May 14	–	–

== Bracket ==
Teams in bold advanced to the next round. The numbers to the left of each team indicate the team's seeding, the numbers to the right indicate the result of games including result in bold of the team that won in that game, and the numbers furthest to the right indicate the number of games the team won in that round.

Quarterfinals
**1**	**Barça**	**93**	**88**	**2**
8	Gran Canaria	82	86	0
**4**	**Joventut**	**100**	76	**81**	**2**
5	Lenovo Tenerife	68	**103**	58	1
**2**	**Real Madrid**	**93**	**83**	**2**
7	Baxi Manresa	76	74	0
3	Valencia Basket	79	**89**	59	1
**6**	**Bitci Baskonia**	**80**	82	**76**	**2**

Semifinals
**1**	**Barça**	**89**	81	**83**	**63**	**3**
4	Joventut	72	**87**	77	60	1
**2**	**Real Madrid**	**94**	**83**	**85**	**3**
6	Bitci Baskonia	84	71	77	0

Finals
1	Barça	75	**71**	66	74	1
**2**	**Real Madrid**	**88**	69	**81**	**81**	**3**

== Quarterfinals ==
All times are in Central European Summer Time (UTC+02:00)

=== Barça v Gran Canaria ===
27 May 2022	**Barça**	**93**–82 (Series: **1–0**)	Gran Canaria	Barcelona
21:00	Scoring by quarter: **24**–17, **24**–22, 19–**25**, **26**–18
	Pts: Davies 16; Rebs: Calathes 9 Asts: Calathes 12; PIR: Calathes 28	Boxscore	Pts: Slaughter 15; Rebs: Shurna 8 Asts: Albicy 6 PIR: Shurna 12	Arena: Palau Blaugrana; Attendance: 5,789; Referees: Fernando Calatrava, Luis Miguel Castillo, David Sánchez

29 May 2022	Gran Canaria	86–**88** (Series: **0–2**)	**Barça**	Las Palmas
21:00	Scoring by quarter: **18**–15, **28**–26, 20–**22**, 20–**25**
	Pts: Ennis 26; Rebs: Shurna 5 Asts: Ennis 4 PIR: Ennis 28	Boxscore	Pts: Mirotić 21; Rebs: Mirotić 9 Asts: Higgins 5 PIR: Mirotić 29	Arena: Gran Canaria Arena; Attendance: 7,029; Referees: Juan Carlos García González, Jorge Martínez, Esperanza Mendoza

Regular season series
Barça won 2–0 in the regular season series

22 September 2021

Boxscore

Gran Canaria	64–**82**	**Barça**

Gran Canaria Arena, Las Palmas

20 March 2022

Boxscore

**Barça**	**98**–80	Gran Canaria

Palau Blaugrana, Barcelona

This was the fourth playoff meeting between these two teams, with Barça winning the previous three meetings.

Previous playoff series
Barça leads 3–0 in all-time playoff series

2004

**FC Barcelona**	**3**–1	Auna Gran Canaria

2004 Quarterfinals

2010

**Regal FC Barcelona**	**2**–0	Gran Canaria 2014

2010 Quarterfinals

2013

**FC Barcelona Regal**	**3**–0	Gran Canaria 2014

2013 Semifinals

=== Real Madrid v Baxi Manresa ===
25 May 2022	**Real Madrid**	**93**–76 (Series: **1–0**)	Baxi Manresa	Madrid
21:00	Scoring by quarter: **21**–14, **27**–15, **23**–20, 22–**27**
	Pts: Causeur 17; Rebs: Poirier 9 Asts: three players 4 PIR: Causeur 23	Boxscore	Pts: Thomasson, Francisco 12; Rebs: Moneke 6 Asts: Thomasson 7 PIR: Maye 12	Arena: WiZink Center; Attendance: 5,553; Referees: Carlos Peruga, Carlos Cortés, Iyán González

28 May 2022	Baxi Manresa	74–**83** (Series: **0–2**)	**Real Madrid**	Manresa
16:30	Scoring by quarter: 21–**25**, **18**–16, 14–**18**, 21–**24**
	Pts: Thomasson, Bako 16; Rebs: Bako 11; Asts: Francisco 5 PIR: Bako 24	Boxscore	Pts: Yabusele 16; Rebs: Yabusele, Poirier 7 Asts: Llull 4 PIR: Yabusele, Tavares 18	Arena: Nou Congost; Attendance: 4,906; Referees: Daniel Hierrezuelo, Juan de Dios Oyón, Alfonso Olivares

Regular season series
Tied 1–1 in the regular season series

4 January 2022

Boxscore

Baxi Manresa	87–**92**	**Real Madrid**

Nou Congost, Manresa

20 March 2022

Boxscore

Real Madrid	75–**86**	**Baxi Manresa**

WiZink Center, Madrid

This was the fifth playoff meeting between these two teams, with Real Madrid winning three of the first four meetings.

Previous playoff series
Madrid leads 3–1 in all-time playoff series

1994

**Real Madrid Teka**	**2**–1	Tdk Manresa

1994 Quarterfinals

1997

**Real Madrid Teka**	**3**–0	Tdk Manresa

1997 Quarterfinals

1998

Real Madrid Teka	1–**3**	**Tdk Manresa**

1998 Semifinals

2019

**Real Madrid**	**2**–0	Baxi Manresa

2019 Quarterfinals

=== Valencia Basket v Bitci Baskonia ===
24 May 2022	Valencia Basket	79–**80** (Series: **0–1**)	**Bitci Baskonia**	Valencia
21:00	Scoring by quarter: 21–21, 14–**22**, **27**–24, **17**–13
	Pts: López-Arostegui 17; Rebs: Tobey 4 Asts: Van Rossom 9 PIR: Tobey 16	Boxscore	Pts: three players 15; Rebs: Costello 9 Asts: Costello, Fontecchio 3 PIR: Costello 17	Arena: La Fonteta; Attendance: 6,591; Referees: Antonio Conde, Jordi Aliaga, Javier Torres

28 May 2022	Bitci Baskonia	82–**89** (Series: **1–1**)	**Valencia Basket**	Vitoria-Gasteiz
18:30	Scoring by quarter: **21**–20, 20–**26**, 18–**21**, **23**–22
	Pts: Peters 18; Rebs: Peters 9 Asts: Baldwin 8 PIR: Peters 33	Boxscore	Pts: Rivero 27; Rebs: three players 5 Asts: Van Rossom 6 PIR: Rivero 31	Arena: Buesa Arena; Attendance: 9,734; Referees: Emilio Pérez Pizarro, Óscar Perea, Francisco Araña

30 May 2022	Valencia Basket	59–**76** (Series: **1–2**)	**Bitci Baskonia**	Valencia
21:00	Scoring by quarter: **20**–9, 17–**25**, 17–**19**, 5–**23**
	Pts: Dubljević 14; Rebs: López-Arostegui 7 Asts: Pradilla, Rivero 3 PIR: Dubljević 17	Boxscore	Pts: Baldwin 19; Rebs: Costello 8 Asts: Baldwin 6 PIR: Baldwin 28	Arena: La Fonteta; Attendance: 7,909; Referees: Miguel Ángel Pérez Pérez, Carlos Peruga, Joaquín García

Regular season series
Tied 1–1 in the regular season series

18 September 2021

Boxscore

Valencia Basket	67–**72**	**Bitci Baskonia**

La Fonteta, Valencia

17 April 2022

Boxscore

Bitci Baskonia	71–**78**	**Valencia Basket**

Buesa Arena, Vitoria-Gasteiz

This was the sixth playoff meeting between these two teams, with Bitci Baskonia winning three of the first five meetings.

Previous playoff series
Baskonia leads 3–2 in all-time playoff series

1991

**Taugrés**	**2**–0	Pamesa Valencia

1991 First round

2002

**TAU Cerámica**	**3**–1	Pamesa Valencia

2002 Quarterfinals

2008

**TAU Cerámica**	**2**–1	Pamesa Valencia

2008 Quarterfinals

2017

Baskonia	1–**3**	**Valencia Basket**

2017 Semifinals

2021

**Valencia Basket**	**2**–1	TD Systems Baskonia

2021 Quarterfinals

=== Joventut v Lenovo Tenerife ===
26 May 2022	**Joventut**	**100**–68 (Series: **1–0**)	Lenovo Tenerife	Badalona
21:00	Scoring by quarter: **27**–7, **27**–14, **24**–22, 22–**25**
	Pts: Busquets, Parra 14; Rebs: Tomić 7 Asts: Ribas 6 PIR: Parra 21	Boxscore	Pts: Huertas 14; Rebs: Guerra, Shermadini 5 Asts: Huertas, Salin 4 PIR: Huertas 11	Arena: Palau Municipal d'Esports; Attendance: 8,287; Referees: Miguel Ángel Pérez Pérez, Rafael Serrano, Alberto Sánchez Sixto

29 May 2022	**Lenovo Tenerife**	**103**–76 (Series: **1–1**)	Joventut	San Cristóbal de La Laguna
13:00	Scoring by quarter: **26**–11, **28**–23, **23**–21, **26**–21
	Pts: Wiltjer 37; Rebs: Doornekamp 7 Asts: Huertas 11; PIR: Wiltjer 42	Boxscore	Pts: Tomić 19; Rebs: Birgander 7 Asts: Ribas 3 PIR: Tomić 28	Arena: Santiago Martín; Attendance: 5,029; Referees: Juan Carlos García González, Martín Caballero, Sergio Manuel

31 May 2022	**Joventut**	**81**–58 (Series: **2–1**)	Lenovo Tenerife	Badalona
21:00	Scoring by quarter: **13**–5, **25**–17, **22**–18, **21**–18
	Pts: Tomić 17; Rebs: Tomić 11; Asts: Bassas 5 PIR: Tomić 23	Boxscore	Pts: Salin 13; Rebs: Shermadini 9 Asts: Huertas 5 PIR: Shermadini 15	Arena: Palau Municipal d'Esports; Attendance: 9,167; Referees: Daniel Hierrezuelo, Emilio Pérez Pizarro, Rubén Sánchez Mohedas

Regular season series
Tied 1–1 in the regular season series

23 October 2021

Boxscore

Lenovo Tenerife	72–**79**	**Joventut**

Santiago Martín, San Cristóbal de La Laguna

12 February 2022

Boxscore

Joventut	58–**74**	**Lenovo Tenerife**

Palau Municipal d'Esports, Badalona

This was the second playoff meeting between these two teams, with Joventut winning the first meeting.

Previous playoff series
Joventut leads 1–0 in all-time playoff series

1987

**Joventut**	**2**–0	Cajacanarias

1987 Quarterfinals

== Semifinals ==
All times are in Central European Summer Time (UTC+02:00)

=== Barça v Joventut ===
3 June 2022	**Barça**	**89**–72 (Series: **1–0**)	Joventut	Barcelona
21:00	Scoring by quarter: **12**–11, **28**–20, **29**–17, 20–**24**
	Pts: Şanlı 16; Rebs: Šmits, Şanlı 8 Asts: Laprovíttola 7 PIR: Şanlı 24	Boxscore	Pts: Ribas, Willis 11; Rebs: Tomić 7 Asts: Tomić, Feliz 3 PIR: Tomić 19	Arena: Palau Blaugrana; Attendance: 5,786; Referees: Antonio Conde, Luis Miguel Castillo, Alfonso Olivares

5 June 2022	Barça	81–**87** (Series: **1–1**)	**Joventut**	Barcelona
12:30	Scoring by quarter: 26–**27**, 14–**15**, 13–**23**, **28**–22
	Pts: Calathes 15; Rebs: Şanlı 10; Asts: Calathes 6 PIR: Exum 19	Boxscore	Pts: Tomić 24; Rebs: Tomić, Birgander 5 Asts: Feliz 6 PIR: Tomić 22	Arena: Palau Blaugrana; Attendance: 5,768; Referees: Carlos Peruga, Óscar Perea, Joaquín García

8 June 2022	Joventut	77–**83** (Series: **1–2**)	**Barça**	Badalona
21:00	Scoring by quarter: 14–**23**, 22–**23**, **20**–15, 21–**22**
	Pts: Tomić 21; Rebs: Tomić 7 Asts: Ribas 5 PIR: Tomić 27	Boxscore	Pts: Mirotić 18; Rebs: Mirotić 7 Asts: Calathes 6 PIR: Mirotić 27	Arena: Palau Municipal d'Esports; Attendance: 10,323; Referees: Miguel Ángel Pérez Pérez, Martín Caballero, Rafael Serrano

10 June 2022	Joventut	60–**63** (Series: **1–3**)	**Barça**	Badalona
21:00	Scoring by quarter: **14**–13, **14**–6, 11–**21**, 21–**23**
	Pts: Tomić 15; Rebs: Tomić 13; Asts: Ribas 5 PIR: Tomić 23	Boxscore	Pts: Mirotić 20; Rebs: Mirotić 7 Asts: Calathes 5 PIR: Mirotić 18	Arena: Palau Municipal d'Esports; Attendance: 10,787; Referees: Juan Carlos García González, Antonio Conde, Joaquín García

Regular season series
Tied 1–1 in the regular season series

30 January 2022

Boxscore

**Barça**	**99**–84	Joventut

Palau Blaugrana, Barcelona

27 March 2022

Boxscore

**Joventut**	**83**–72	Barça

Palau Municipal d'Esports, Badalona

This was the 14th playoff meeting between these two teams, with Barça winning 10 of the first 13 meetings.

Previous playoff series
Barça leads 10–3 in all-time playoff series

1985

FC Barcelona	1–**2**	**Ron Negrita Joventut**

1985 Semifinals

1986

**FC Barcelona**	**2**–1	Ron Negrita Joventut

1986 Semifinals

1987

**FC Barcelona**	**3**–1	Ron Negrita Joventut

1987 Finals

1988

**FC Barcelona**	**3**–2	Ram Joventut

1988 Semifinals

1990

**FC Barcelona**	**3**–0	Ram Joventut Badalona

1990 Finals

1991

**Montigalá Joventut**	**3**–1	FC Barcelona

1991 Finals

1993

**Marbella Joventut**	**3**–2	FC Barcelona Banca Catalana

1993 Semifinals

1994

**FC Barcelona Banca Catalana**	**3**–2	7Up Joventut

1994 Semifinals

1998

Festina Joventut	1–**3**	**FC Barcelona Banca Catalana**

1998 Quarterfinals

2008

DKV Joventut	0–**2**	**AXA FC Barcelona**

2008 Semifinals

2015

**FC Barcelona**	**2**–0	FIATC Joventut

2015 Quarterfinals

2019

**Barça Lassa**	**2**–0	Divina Seguros Joventut

2019 Quarterfinals

2021

**Barça**	**2**–1	Joventut

2021 Quarterfinals

=== Real Madrid v Bitci Baskonia ===
2 June 2022	**Real Madrid**	**94**–84 (Series: **1–0**)	Bitci Baskonia	Madrid
22:00	Scoring by quarter: **22**–19, 22–**23**, **30**–21, 20–**21**
	Pts: Causeur 16; Rebs: Tavares 13; Asts: Fernández, Núñez 4 PIR: Tavares 24	Boxscore	Pts: Peters 15; Rebs: Costello, Enoch 6 Asts: Granger 7 PIR: Costello 16	Arena: WiZink Center; Attendance: 6,123; Referees: Benjamín Jiménez, Carlos Cortés, Javier Torres

4 June 2022	**Real Madrid**	**83**–71 (Series: **2–0**)	Bitci Baskonia	Madrid
18:00	Scoring by quarter: **18**–15, **22**–15, **26**–15, 17–**26**
	Pts: Hanga 18; Rebs: Tavares 8 Asts: Causeur 5 PIR: Tavares 22	Boxscore	Pts: Marinković 17; Rebs: Baldwin, Enoch 7 Asts: Baldwin 4 PIR: Peters 19	Arena: WiZink Center; Attendance: 7,789; Referees: Emilio Pérez Pizarro, Fernando Calatrava, Francisco Araña

7 June 2022	Bitci Baskonia	77–**85** (Series: **0–3**)	**Real Madrid**	Vitoria-Gasteiz
21:00	Scoring by quarter: 14–**25**, **22**–16, 17–**25**, **24**–19
	Pts: Baldwin 26; Rebs: Costello 6 Asts: three players 2 PIR: Baldwin 16	Boxscore	Pts: Tavares 23; Rebs: Tavares 12; Asts: Deck 4 PIR: Tavares 36	Arena: Buesa Arena; Attendance: 9,748; Referees: Daniel Hierrezuelo, Jordi Aliaga, Juan de Dios Oyón

Regular season series
Tied 1–1 in the regular season series

31 October 2021

Boxscore

Bitci Baskonia	65–**83**	**Real Madrid**

Buesa Arena, Vitoria-Gasteiz

6 March 2022

Boxscore

Real Madrid	72–**80**	**Bitci Baskonia**

WiZink Center, Madrid

This was the 12th playoff meeting between these two teams, with Real Madrid winning eight of the first 11 meetings.

Previous playoff series
Madrid leads 8–3 in all-time playoff series

1988

**Real Madrid**	**2**–1	Taugrés

1988 Quarterfinals

1989

**Real Madrid**	**2**–0	Taugrés

1989 Quarterfinals

1990

**Real Madrid**	**2**–0	Taugrés

1990 Quarterfinals

1991

Real Madrid Otaysa	0–**2**	**Taugrés**

1991 Quarterfinals

1992

**Real Madrid Asegurator**	**3**–2	Taugrés

1992 Semifinals

2001

**Real Madrid**	**3**–2	TAU Cerámica

2001 Semifinals

2005

TAU Cerámica	2–**3**	**Real Madrid**

2005 Finals

2009

**TAU Cerámica**	**2**–1	Real Madrid

2009 Semifinals

2010

**Caja Laboral**	**3**–2	Real Madrid

2010 Semifinals

2012

**Real Madrid**	**3**–2	Caja Laboral

2012 Semifinals

2018

**Real Madrid**	**3**–1	Kirolbet Baskonia

2018 Finals

== Finals ==
All times are in Central European Summer Time (UTC+02:00)

13 June 2022	Barça	75–**88** (Series: **0–1**)	**Real Madrid**	Barcelona
21:00	Scoring by quarter: 17–**30**, 14–**19**, 20–**25**, **24**–14
	Pts: Laprovíttola 15; Rebs: Davies, Mirotić 6 Asts: Calathes 4 PIR: Mirotić 16	Boxscore	Pts: Deck 18; Rebs: Yabusele 9 Asts: Hanga 6 PIR: Deck 20	Arena: Palau Blaugrana; Attendance: 6,759; Referees: Daniel Hierrezuelo, Jordi Aliaga, Martín Caballero

15 June 2022	**Barça**	**71**–69 (Series: **1–1**)	Real Madrid	Barcelona
21:00	Scoring by quarter: 13–**17**, **19**–15, **24**–22, 15–15
	Pts: Mirotić 26; Rebs: Mirotić 7 Asts: Jokubaitis 3 PIR: Mirotić 26	Boxscore	Pts: Yabusele 16; Rebs: Yabusele 11; Asts: Deck, Hanga 2 PIR: Yabusele 21	Arena: Palau Blaugrana; Attendance: 7,201; Referees: Emilio Pérez Pizarro, Fernando Calatrava, Luis Miguel Castillo

17 June 2022	**Real Madrid**	**81**–66 (Series: **2–1**)	Barça	Madrid
21:00	Scoring by quarter: **21**–16, **25**–23, **20**–14, **15**–13
	Pts: Deck 14; Rebs: Poirier 10; Asts: Hanga 3 PIR: Yabusele, Poirier 18	Boxscore	Pts: Kuric 15; Rebs: Laprovíttola 4 Asts: Calathes 6 PIR: Kuric 15	Arena: WiZink Center; Attendance: 11,793; Referees: Carlos Peruga, Benjamín Jiménez, Alberto Sánchez Sixto

19 June 2022	**Real Madrid**	**81**–74 (Series: **3–1**)	Barça	Madrid
18:00	Scoring by quarter: **13**–10, 21–**23**, 23–23, **24**–18
	Pts: Tavares 25; Rebs: Tavares 13; Asts: Deck 3 PIR: Tavares 41	Boxscore	Pts: Mirotić 14; Rebs: Calathes 9 Asts: five players 2 PIR: Mirotić, Exum 17	Arena: WiZink Center; Attendance: 12,315; Referees: Daniel Hierrezuelo, Óscar Perea, Martín Caballero

Regular season series
Barça won 2–0 in the regular season series

23 January 2022

Boxscore

Real Madrid	75–**85**	**Barça**

WiZink Center, Madrid

10 April 2022

Boxscore

**Barça**	**108**–97	Real Madrid

Palau Blaugrana, Barcelona

This was the 21st playoff meeting between these two teams, with each team winning 10 out of the first 20 meetings.

Previous playoff series
Tied 10–10 in all-time playoff series

1984

**Real Madrid**	**2**–1	FC Barcelona

1984 Finals

1986

**Real Madrid**	**2**–0	FC Barcelona

1986 Finals

1987

**FC Barcelona**	**3**–1	Real Madrid

1987 Semifinals

1988

**FC Barcelona**	**3**–2	Real Madrid

1988 Finals

1989

**FC Barcelona**	**3**–2	Real Madrid

1989 Finals

1992

**Real Madrid Asegurator**	**2**–0	FC Barcelona

1992 Quarterfinals

1994

**Real Madrid Teka**	**3**–0	FC Barcelona Banca Catalana

1994 Finals

1995

**FC Barcelona Banca Catalana**	**3**–2	Real Madrid Teka

1995 Semifinals

1997

Real Madrid Teka	2–**3**	**FC Barcelona Banca Catalana**

1997 Finals

2000

FC Barcelona	2–**3**	**Real Madrid Teka**

2000 Finals

2001

**FC Barcelona**	**3**–0	Real Madrid

2001 Finals

2006

**Winterthur FC Barcelona**	**3**–1	Real Madrid

2006 Quarterfinals

2007

**Real Madrid**	**3**–1	Winterthur FC Barcelona

2007 Finals

2012

**FC Barcelona Regal**	**3**–2	Real Madrid

2012 Finals

2013

**Real Madrid**	**3**–2	FC Barcelona Regal

2013 Finals

2014

Real Madrid	1–**3**	**FC Barcelona**

2014 Finals

2015

**Real Madrid**	**3**–0	FC Barcelona

2015 Finals

2016

FC Barcelona Lassa	1–**3**	**Real Madrid**

2016 Finals

2019

**Real Madrid**	**3**–1	Barça Lassa

2019 Finals

2021

Real Madrid	0–**2**	**Barça**

2021 Finals
