= 2021–22 ACB season =

Liga Endesa^{1}
- Season: 2021–22
- Games played: 327
- Teams: 18

Regular season
- Season MVP: (Bosnia and Herzegovina) Džanan Musa
- Relegated: MoraBanc Andorra; Hereda San Pablo Burgos

Finals
- Champions: Real Madrid; 14th ACB title 36th Spanish title
- Runners-up: Barça
- Semi-finalists: Joventut; Bitci Baskonia
- Finals MVP: (Cape Verde) Edy Tavares

Statistical leaders
Points	(Bosnia and Herzegovina) Džanan Musa	20.1
Rebounds	(Dominican Republic) Ángel Delgado	8.5
Assists	(United States) Shannon Evans	6.8

Records
- Biggest home win: Joventut 105–61 Manresa (9 October 2021)
- Biggest away win: Betis 64–106 Manresa (26 September 2021)
- Highest scoring: Barça 108–97 Real Madrid (10 April 2022)
- Winning streak: 10 games Real Madrid
- Losing streak: 7 games Casademont Zaragoza
- Highest attendance: 12,315; Real Madrid 81–74 Barça (19 June 2022)
- Lowest attendance: 956; Tenerife 87–82 Unicaja (23 September 2021)
- ^{1} Sponsored league name, referring to Endesa.

The 2021–22 ACB season, also known as Liga Endesa for sponsorship reasons, was the 39th season of the top Spanish professional basketball league, since its establishment in 1983. It started on 18 September 2021 with the first round of the regular season and ended on 19 June 2022 with the finals.

Barça was the defending champion which lost the final series 1–3 to Real Madrid which reclaimed a record 36th Spanish title and their 14th ACB title ending a 3-year drought after their last triumph in 2019.

== Teams ==
=== Promotion and relegation (pre-season) ===
A total of 18 teams contested the league, including 17 sides from the 2020–21 season and one promoted from the 2020–21 LEB Oro.

Team promoted from LEB Oro

- Río Breogán

Teams relegated to LEB Oro

- Movistar Estudiantes
- Acunsa GBC

=== Venues and locations ===
Location of teams in 2021–22 ACB
Location of teams from the Canary Islands in 2021–22 ACB

Team	Home city	Arena	Capacity
Barça	Barcelona	Palau Blaugrana	7,585
Baxi Manresa	Manresa	Nou Congost	5,000
Bitci Baskonia	Vitoria-Gasteiz	Buesa Arena	15,716
Casademont Zaragoza	Zaragoza	Pabellón Príncipe Felipe	10,744
Coosur Real Betis	Seville	San Pablo	7,242
Gran Canaria	Las Palmas	Gran Canaria Arena	9,870
Hereda San Pablo Burgos	Burgos	Coliseum Burgos	9,000
Joventut	Badalona	Palau Municipal d'Esports	12,760
Lenovo Tenerife	San Cristóbal de La Laguna	Santiago Martín	5,100
Monbus Obradoiro	Santiago de Compostela	Multiusos Fontes do Sar	6,000
MoraBanc Andorra	Andorra la Vella	M.I. Govern Andorra	5,005
Real Madrid	Madrid	WiZink Center	13,109
Río Breogán	Lugo	Pazo dos Deportes	5,310
Surne Bilbao Basket	Bilbao	Bilbao Arena	10,014
UCAM Murcia	Murcia	Palacio de Deportes	7,454
Unicaja	Málaga	Martín Carpena	10,642
Urbas Fuenlabrada	Fuenlabrada	Fernando Martín	5,700
Valencia Basket	Valencia	La Fonteta	8,500

=== Personnel and sponsorship ===
Team	Head coach	Captain	Kit manufacturer	Shirt sponsor
Barça	(Lithuania) Šarūnas Jasikevičius	(Spain) Pierre Oriola	Nike	Assistència Sanitària
Baxi Manresa	(Spain) Pedro Martínez	(Spain) Guillem Jou	Pentex	Baxi
Bitci Baskonia	(Croatia) Neven Spahija	(Uruguay) Jayson Granger	Kelme	Bitci
Casademont Zaragoza	(Serbia) Dragan Šakota	(Spain) Rodrigo San Miguel	Mercury	Casademont
Coosur Real Betis	(Spain) Luis Casimiro	(Spain) Pablo Almazán	Kappa	Coosur
Gran Canaria	(Spain) Porfirio Fisac	(Serbia) Oliver Stević	Spalding	
Hereda San Pablo Burgos	(Spain) Paco Olmos	(Brazil) Vítor Benite	Givova	Inmobiliaria San Pablo, Burgos
Joventut	(Spain) Carles Duran	(Spain) Albert Ventura	Spalding	Fundación Probitas
Lenovo Tenerife	(Spain) Txus Vidorreta	(Brazil) Marcelo Huertas	Austral	Lenovo, Tenerife
Monbus Obradoiro	(Spain) Moncho Fernández	(Spain) Álvaro Muñoz	Deportes Caneda	Estrella Galicia 0,0
MoraBanc Andorra	(Spain) Óscar Quintana	(Andorra) Guillem Colom	Hummel	MoraBanc, Andorra
Real Madrid	(Spain) Pablo Laso	(Spain) Sergio Llull	Adidas	Palladium Hotel Group
Río Breogán	(Croatia) Veljko Mršić	(Bosnia and Herzegovina) Džanan Musa	Wibo	Estrella Galicia 0,0
Surne Bilbao Basket	(Spain) Álex Mumbrú	(France) Jonathan Rousselle	Hummel	Surne Seguros
UCAM Murcia	(Spain) Sito Alonso	(Dominican Republic) Sadiel Rojas	Hummel	UCAM, Costa Cálida
Unicaja	(Spain) Ibon Navarro	(Spain) Carlos Suárez	Joma	Unicaja, Málaga
Urbas Fuenlabrada	(Spain) Josep María Raventós	(Democratic Republic of the Congo) Christian Eyenga	Pentex	URBAS Grupo Financiero
Valencia Basket	(Spain) Joan Peñarroya	(Montenegro) Bojan Dubljević	Luanvi	Cultura del Esfuerzo (Note: Cultura del Esfuerzo (transl. "Culture of Effort") is the motto of the club.)

=== Managerial changes ===
Team	Outgoing manager	Manner of departure	Date of vacancy	Position in table	Replaced with	Date of appointment
Casademont Zaragoza	(Spain) Luis Casimiro	End of contract	17 June 2021	Pre-season	(Spain) Jaume Ponsarnau	17 June 2021
Valencia Basket	(Spain) Jaume Ponsarnau	End of contract	17 June 2021	Pre-season	(Spain) Joan Peñarroya	21 June 2021
Hereda San Pablo Burgos	(Spain) Joan Peñarroya	End of contract	17 June 2021	Pre-season	(Croatia) Žan Tabak	30 June 2021
Río Breogán	(Spain) Diego Epifanio	End of contract	6 July 2021	Pre-season	(Spain) Paco Olmos	15 July 2021
Bitci Baskonia	(Montenegro) Duško Ivanović	Sacked	15 November 2021	11th (4–6)	(Croatia) Neven Spahija	15 November 2021
Hereda San Pablo Burgos	(Croatia) Žan Tabak	Sacked	15 November 2021	14th (3–7)	(Spain) Félix Alonso (interim)	15 November 2021
Coosur Real Betis	(Spain) Joan Plaza	Resigned	22 November 2021	18th (2–9)	(Spain) Luis Casimiro	22 November 2021
Hereda San Pablo Burgos	(Spain) Félix Alonso	End of interim period	29 November 2021	15th (3–8)	(Spain) Salva Maldonado	29 November 2021
Río Breogán	(Spain) Paco Olmos	Signed for Hereda San Pablo Burgos	9 January 2022	7th (8–6)	(Spain) Javi Muñoz (interim)	9 January 2022
Hereda San Pablo Burgos	(Spain) Salva Maldonado	Sacked	10 January 2022	17th (4–11)	(Spain) Paco Olmos	10 January 2022
Río Breogán	(Spain) Javi Muñoz	End of interim period	20 January 2022	7th (9–7)	(Croatia) Veljko Mršić	20 January 2022
MoraBanc Andorra	(Spain) Ibon Navarro	Sacked	23 January 2022	16th (5–12)	(Spain) David Eudal	23 January 2022
Unicaja	(Greece) Fotios Katsikaris	Sacked	6 February 2022	13th (7–11)	(Spain) Ibon Navarro	10 February 2022
Casademont Zaragoza	(Spain) Jaume Ponsarnau	Sacked	13 March 2022	13th (8–15)	(Spain) Aleix Durán (interim)	13 March 2022
Casademont Zaragoza	(Spain) Aleix Durán	End of interim period	20 March 2022	16th (8–16)	(Serbia) Dragan Šakota	20 March 2022
MoraBanc Andorra	(Spain) David Eudal	Resigned	18 April 2022	18th (8–21)	(Spain) Óscar Quintana	18 April 2022

== Regular season ==
=== League table ===
Pos	Team	Pld	W	L	PF	PA	PD	Qualification or relegation
1	Barça	34	27	7	2833	2539	+294	Qualification to playoffs
2	Real Madrid	34	25	9	2840	2580	+260	Qualification to playoffs
3	Valencia Basket	34	23	11	2827	2702	+125	Qualification to playoffs
4	Joventut	34	22	12	2776	2666	+110	Qualification to playoffs
5	Lenovo Tenerife	34	21	13	2819	2685	+134	Qualification to playoffs
6	Bitci Baskonia	34	20	14	2777	2675	+102	Qualification to playoffs
7	Baxi Manresa	34	20	14	2995	2905	+90	Qualification to playoffs
8	Gran Canaria	34	17	17	2750	2798	−48	Qualification to playoffs
9	Surne Bilbao Basket	34	16	18	2768	2886	−118	
10	UCAM Murcia	34	16	18	2900	2822	+78	
11	Río Breogán	34	16	18	2831	2849	−18	
12	Unicaja	34	13	21	2742	2741	+1	
13	Coosur Real Betis	34	13	21	2674	2883	−209	
14	Urbas Fuenlabrada	34	12	22	2807	2938	−131	
15	Monbus Obradoiro	34	12	22	2792	2930	−138	
16	Casademont Zaragoza	34	12	22	2570	2783	−213	
17	MoraBanc Andorra	34	11	23	2665	2813	−148	Relegation to LEB Oro
18	Hereda San Pablo Burgos	34	10	24	2632	2803	−171	Relegation to LEB Oro

Source: ACB
Rules for classification: 1) Win–loss record; 2) Head–to–head record; 3) Head–to–head point difference; 4) Point difference; 5) Points scored; 6) Sum of quotients of points scored (Note: Head–to–head record is used only after all the matches between the teams in question have been played)

=== Results ===
Home \ Away	BAR	BAX	BKN	CAZ	BET	GCA	BUR	CJB	LNT	MOB	MBA	RMB	BRE	SBB	UCM	UNI	URF	VBC
Barça	—	95–96	78–91	76–63	83–63	98–80	84–69	99–84	69–65	83–67	107–88	108–97	78–69	84–62	85–78	63–73	79–69	79–87
Baxi Manresa	80–94	—	74–67	94–73	96–102	91–72	93–68	95–91	95–93	104–84	94–60	87–92	86–75	87–79	103–93	85–74	99–89	69–89
Bitci Baskonia	77–96	107–85	—	91–59	93–72	70–86	80–69	81–89	65–71	91–70	83–77	65–83	89–84	101–86	93–83	92–89	95–86	71–78
Casademont Zaragoza	76–71	98–91	97–79	—	82–72	76–86	54–75	63–77	62–77	80–73	80–83	65–86	79–75	80–82	91–78	93–82	74–85	70–76
Coosur Real Betis	61–78	64–106	83–87	79–69	—	93–86	71–74	66–77	72–81	76–87	102–98	69–71	84–81	71–88	84–93	73–79	99–83	75–68
Gran Canaria	64–82	80–82	83–77	79–76	94–70	—	82–89	84–71	89–77	71–69	84–78	83–91	84–86	88–86	83–100	76–59	79–60	89–83
Hereda San Pablo Burgos	69–83	82–90	62–78	78–56	76–84	77–86	—	92–76	73–81	77–82	81–70	70–85	62–87	104–97	84–102	89–74	66–83	65–69
Joventut	83–72	105–61	72–61	84–78	84–82	82–75	82–65	—	58–74	78–84	73–79	71–90	96–87	85–79	83–77	76–70	92–75	76–68
Lenovo Tenerife	60–75	94–83	78–91	90–65	99–97	98–89	91–78	72–79	—	86–83	79–70	72–59	96–78	89–79	87–71	87–82	87–74	78–80
Monbus Obradoiro	64–79	98–91	81–76	87–82	86–93	106–97	101–94	93–91	81–84	—	81–73	88–89	100–83	91–96	70–104	71–85	93–81	85–89
MoraBanc Andorra	74–86	79–82	78–79	83–92	76–93	87–71	73–71	91–72	75–77	86–73	—	58–86	79–86	82–72	90–89	83–74	92–84	75–76
Real Madrid	75–85	75–86	72–80	94–69	71–48	70–75	70–63	99–89	86–77	78–68	83–88	—	90–65	95–61	90–69	79–74	92–77	93–94
Río Breogán	72–74	98–94	89–83	82–85	97–65	76–66	105–96	87–90	92–73	80–78	83–74	71–79	—	86–94	94–89	93–84	97–89	99–82
Surne Bilbao Basket	68–84	89–82	62–90	76–100	98–99	95–80	87–81	71–77	87–79	80–76	74–71	79–67	83–75	—	78–77	83–77	85–80	84–78
UCAM Murcia	87–89	71–67	80–79	72–77	88–66	86–75	83–89	71–83	88–86	98–80	96–67	71–80	91–72	92–87	—	79–84	99–76	71–72
Unicaja	73–75	95–100	72–73	112–72	96–80	79–80	89–78	72–76	64–97	91–79	78–74	91–92	72–64	91–75	87–88	—	90–86	82–87
Urbas Fuenlabrada	69–86	90–82	84–70	77–55	77–82	87–92	91–96	82–104	104–96	93–92	91–78	85–88	88–65	87–82	105–95	53–73	—	88–87
Valencia Basket	86–76	90–85	67–72	81–79	81–84	91–62	84–70	71–70	92–88	91–71	81–76	79–93	97–98	100–84	86–91	90–75	97–79	—

Source: ACB
Legend: Blue = home team win; Red = away team win.

== Playoffs ==
Quarterfinals
1	Barça	93	88	2
8	Gran Canaria	82	86	0
4	Joventut	100	76	81	2
5	Lenovo Tenerife	68	103	58	1
2	Real Madrid	93	83	2
7	Baxi Manresa	76	74	0
3	Valencia Basket	79	89	59	1
6	Bitci Baskonia	80	82	76	2

Semifinals
1	Barça	89	81	83	63	3
4	Joventut	72	87	77	60	1
2	Real Madrid	94	83	85	3
6	Bitci Baskonia	84	71	77	0

Finals
1	Barça	75	71	66	74	1
2	Real Madrid	88	69	81	81	3

== Final standings ==
Pos	Team	Pld	W	L	Qualification or relegation
1	Real Madrid (C)	43	33	10	Already qualified to EuroLeague
2	Barça	44	33	11	Already qualified to EuroLeague
3	Joventut	41	25	16	Qualification to EuroCup
4	Bitci Baskonia	40	22	18	Already qualified to EuroLeague
5	Valencia Basket	37	24	13	Already qualified to EuroLeague
6	Lenovo Tenerife	37	22	15	Qualification to Champions League regular season
7	Baxi Manresa	36	20	16	Qualification to Champions League regular season
8	Gran Canaria	36	17	19	Qualification to EuroCup
9	Surne Bilbao Basket	34	16	18	Qualification to Champions League regular season
10	UCAM Murcia	34	16	18	Qualification to Champions League regular season
11	Río Breogán	34	16	18	Qualification to Champions League qualifying rounds
12	Unicaja	34	13	21	Qualification to Champions League qualifying rounds
13	Coosur Real Betis	34	13	21	
14	Urbas Fuenlabrada	34	12	22	
15	Monbus Obradoiro	34	12	22	
16	Casademont Zaragoza	34	12	22	
17	MoraBanc Andorra (R)	34	11	23	Relegation to LEB Oro
18	Hereda San Pablo Burgos (R)	34	10	24	Relegation to LEB Oro

Source: ACB
(C) Champions; (R) Relegated

== Attendances to arenas ==
=== Restrictions ===
In response to the COVID-19 pandemic, clubs were not allowed to use the total capacity of their arenas. According to the progress of the pandemic, the capacity allowed each month was decided by the Government of Spain, in agreement with the Autonomous Communities.

- September: 40% of capacity allowed. Additionally, Catalonia reduced it to 30%.
- October to December: 80% of capacity allowed, except for Catalonia and Basque Country, whose Governments limited initially the attendance to 30% and 40%, respectively. On October 5, 2021, Basque Country increased the capacity allowed to 80%. On October 15, 2021, Catalonia increased the capacity allowed to 80%.
- January: 50% of capacity allowed.
- February: 75% of capacity allowed.
- March to June: 100% of capacity allowed.

=== Average attendances ===
Pos	Team	Total	High	Low	Average
1	Hereda San Pablo Burgos	133,795	9,568	3,550	7,870
2	Bitci Baskonia	128,691	10,038	5,062	6,773
3	Surne Bilbao Basket	100,809	8,487	2,747	5,930
4	Joventut	120,768	12,166	2,362	5,751
5	Real Madrid	125,608	12,315	2,648	5,709
6	Casademont Zaragoza	87,753	7,347	3,128	5,162
7	Barça	110,777	7,438	2,284	5,035
8	UCAM Murcia	81,916	6,660	2,036	4,819
9	Valencia Basket	84,367	7,909	2,908	4,440
10	Monbus Obradoiro	72,216	5,415	2,200	4,248
11	Unicaja	72,038	6,257	2,473	4,238
12	Río Breogán	71,451	5,280	2,086	4,203
13	Gran Canaria	74,748	7,029	1,549	4,153
14	Coosur Real Betis	66,858	5,850	1,286	3,933
15	Baxi Manresa	67,572	5,000	1,400	3,754
16	Urbas Fuenlabrada	62,573	4,985	1,711	3,681
17	Lenovo Tenerife	62,378	5,133	956	3,465
18	MoraBanc Andorra	47,765	5,000	1,500	2,810
	League total	1,572,083	12,315	956	4,808

Source: ACB

== Awards ==
All official awards of the 2021–22 ACB season.

=== MVP ===
Pos.	Player	Team
SF	(Bosnia and Herzegovina) Džanan Musa	Río Breogán

=== Finals MVP ===
Pos.	Player	Team
C	(Cape Verde) Edy Tavares	Real Madrid

=== All-ACB Teams ===
Pos.	First Team		Second Team	
Pos.	Player	Team	Player	Team
PG	(Brazil) Marcelo Huertas	Lenovo Tenerife	(United States) Shannon Evans	Coosur Real Betis
SG	(Argentina) Nicolás Laprovíttola	Barça	(United States) Isaiah Taylor	UCAM Murcia
SF	(Bosnia and Herzegovina) Džanan Musa	Río Breogán	(United States) Joe Thomasson	Baxi Manresa
PF	(Nigeria) Chima Moneke	Baxi Manresa	(Spain) Nikola Mirotić	Barça
C	(Georgia (country)) Giorgi Shermadini	Lenovo Tenerife	(Cape Verde) Edy Tavares	Real Madrid

=== Best Young Player Award ===
Pos.	Player	Team
SF	(Spain) Joel Parra	Joventut

=== Best All-Young Team ===
Pos.	Player	Team
PG	(Slovenia) Žiga Samar	Urbas Fuenlabrada
SG	(Lithuania) Rokas Jokubaitis	Barça
SF	(Spain) Joel Parra	Joventut
PF	(Spain) Jaime Pradilla	Valencia Basket
C	(Senegal) Khalifa Diop	Gran Canaria

=== Best Defender ===
Pos.	Player	Team
C	(Cape Verde) Edy Tavares	Real Madrid

=== Player of the round ===
Round	Player	Team	PIR
1	(Bosnia and Herzegovina) Džanan Musa	Río Breogán	35
2	(Spain) Nikola Mirotić	Barça	36
2	(Uruguay) Bruno Fitipaldo	Lenovo Tenerife	36
3	(Spain) Nikola Mirotić (2)	Barça	32
4	(Lithuania) Laurynas Birutis	Monbus Obradoiro	30
5	(Lithuania) Rokas Giedraitis	Bitci Baskonia	26
6	(France) Amine Noua	MoraBanc Andorra	31
7	(Senegal) Clevin Hannah	MoraBanc Andorra	35
8	(Slovenia) Klemen Prepelič	Valencia Basket	29
9	(Lithuania) Tadas Sedekerskis	Bitci Baskonia	35
10	(Senegal) Clevin Hannah (2)	MoraBanc Andorra	30
10	(Croatia) Ante Tomić	Joventut	30
11	(Georgia (country)) Giorgi Shermadini	Lenovo Tenerife	41
12	(Lithuania) Laurynas Birutis (2)	Monbus Obradoiro	28
13	(United States) Vitto Brown	Coosur Real Betis	36
14	(Bosnia and Herzegovina) Džanan Musa (2)	Río Breogán	44
15	(Bosnia and Herzegovina) Džanan Musa (3)	Río Breogán	39
15	(Nigeria) Chima Moneke	Baxi Manresa	39
16	(Lithuania) Laurynas Birutis (3)	Monbus Obradoiro	37
17	(Bosnia and Herzegovina) Džanan Musa (4)	Río Breogán	36
18	(Georgia (country)) Giorgi Shermadini (2)	Lenovo Tenerife	32
18	(United States) Shannon Evans	Coosur Real Betis	32
19	(Georgia (country)) Giorgi Shermadini (3)	Lenovo Tenerife	33
20	(United States) Codi Miller-McIntyre	MoraBanc Andorra	34
21	(United States) Shannon Evans (2)	Coosur Real Betis	31
22	(Bosnia and Herzegovina) Džanan Musa (5)	Río Breogán	47
23	(Brazil) Marcelo Huertas	Lenovo Tenerife	38
24	(Georgia (country)) Giorgi Shermadini (4)	Lenovo Tenerife	36
25	(Canada) Kyle Alexander	Urbas Fuenlabrada	37
26	(Ivory Coast) Matt Costello	Bitci Baskonia	32
27	(United States) Shannon Evans (3)	Coosur Real Betis	30
28	(Croatia) Ante Tomić (2)	Joventut	33
29	(United States) Joe Thomasson	Baxi Manresa	35
30	(United States) Wade Baldwin	Bitci Baskonia	41
31	(Nigeria) Chima Moneke (2)	Baxi Manresa	43
32	(Dominican Republic) Ángel Delgado	Surne Bilbao Basket	44
33	(United States) Shannon Evans (4)	Coosur Real Betis	39
34	(United States) Shannon Evans (5)	Coosur Real Betis	37

=== Player of the month ===
Month	Rounds	Player	Team	PIR	W–L	Ref
September	1–3	(Spain) Nikola Mirotić	Barça	27.7	3–0	
October	4–8	(Cape Verde) Edy Tavares	Real Madrid	20.2	4–1	
November	9–11	(Uruguay) Jayson Granger	Bitci Baskonia	25	2–1	
December	12–15	(Bosnia and Herzegovina) Džanan Musa	Río Breogán	34	3–1	
January	16–17	(United States) James Webb	UCAM Murcia	24.5	1–1	
February	21–22	(Bosnia and Herzegovina) Džanan Musa (2)	Río Breogán	30.5	1–1	
March	23–26	(Georgia (country)) Giorgi Shermadini	Lenovo Tenerife	24.4	4–1	
April	27–30	(Georgia (country)) Giorgi Shermadini (2)	Lenovo Tenerife	27.4	4–3	
May	31–34	(United States) Shannon Evans	Coosur Real Betis	37	3–0	

== ACB clubs in international competitions ==
Euroleague Basketball competitions
Team	Competition	Progress	Result	W–L
Real Madrid	EuroLeague	Championship game	Loss vs. (Turkish Basketball Federation) Anadolu Efes	22–11
Real Madrid	EuroLeague	Semifinals	Win vs. (Spanish Basketball Federation) Barcelona	22–11
Real Madrid	EuroLeague	Playoffs	3–0 vs. (Israeli Basketball Association) Maccabi Playtika Tel Aviv	22–11
Real Madrid	EuroLeague	Regular season	4th of 15 teams (18–10)	22–11
Barça	EuroLeague	Third place game	Win vs. (Hellenic Basketball Federation) Olympiacos	25–10
Barça	EuroLeague	Semifinals	Loss vs. (Spanish Basketball Federation) Real Madrid	25–10
Barça	EuroLeague	Playoffs	3–2 vs. (German Basketball Federation) Bayern Munich	25–10
Barça	EuroLeague	Regular season	1st of 15 teams (21–7)	25–10
Bitci Baskonia	EuroLeague	Regular season	9th of 15 teams (12–16)	12–16
Valencia Basket	EuroCup	Semifinals	Loss vs. (Italian Basketball Federation) Virtus Segafredo Bologna	14–7
Valencia Basket	EuroCup	Quarterfinals	Win vs. (French Federation of Basketball) Metropolitans 92	14–7
Valencia Basket	EuroCup	Eighthfinals	Win vs. (German Basketball Federation) Hamburg Towers	14–7
Valencia Basket	EuroCup	Regular season Group B	2nd of 10 teams (12–6)	14–7
MoraBanc Andorra	EuroCup	Semifinals	Loss vs. (Turkish Basketball Federation) Frutti Extra Bursaspor	12–7
MoraBanc Andorra	EuroCup	Quarterfinals	Win vs. (Spanish Basketball Federation) Gran Canaria	12–7
MoraBanc Andorra	EuroCup	Eighthfinals	Win vs. (Basketball Federation of Montenegro) Budućnost VOLI	12–7
MoraBanc Andorra	EuroCup	Regular season Group A	4th of 10 teams (10–6)	12–7
Gran Canaria	EuroCup	Quarterfinals	Loss vs. (Spanish Basketball Federation) MoraBanc Andorra	13–7
Gran Canaria	EuroCup	Eighthfinals	Win vs. (Polish Basketball Federation) Śląsk Wrocław	13–7
Gran Canaria	EuroCup	Regular season Group B	1st of 10 teams (12–6)	13–7
Joventut	EuroCup	Eighthfinals	Loss vs. (German Basketball Federation) ratiopharm Ulm	12–5
Joventut	EuroCup	Regular season Group A	1st of 10 teams (12–4)	12–5

FIBA competitions
Team	Competition	Progress	Result	W–L
Hereda San Pablo Burgos	Intercontinental Cup	Final	Loss vs. (Brazil) Flamengo	1–1
Hereda San Pablo Burgos	Intercontinental Cup	Semi-finals	Win vs. (Egypt) Zamalek	1–1
Hereda San Pablo Burgos	Champions League	Play-ins	1–2 vs. (Turkish Basketball Federation) Darüşşafaka	5–4
Hereda San Pablo Burgos	Champions League	Regular season Group H	2nd of 4 teams (4–2)	5–4
Lenovo Tenerife	Champions League	Final	Win vs. (Spanish Basketball Federation) Baxi Manresa	16–3
Lenovo Tenerife	Champions League	Semi-finals	Win vs. (Israeli Basketball Association) Hapoel Holon	16–3
Lenovo Tenerife	Champions League	Quarter-finals	2–0 vs. (Turkish Basketball Federation) Tofaş	16–3
Lenovo Tenerife	Champions League	Round of 16 Group L	1st of 4 teams (6–0)	16–3
Lenovo Tenerife	Champions League	Play-ins	2–1 vs. (Turkish Basketball Federation) Pınar Karşıyaka	16–3
Lenovo Tenerife	Champions League	Regular season Group A	2nd of 4 teams (4–2)	16–3
Baxi Manresa	Champions League	Final	Loss vs. (Spanish Basketball Federation) Lenovo Tenerife	12–4
Baxi Manresa	Champions League	Semi-finals	Win vs. (German Basketball Federation) MHP Riesen Ludwigsburg	12–4
Baxi Manresa	Champions League	Quarter-finals	2–0 vs. (Spanish Basketball Federation) Unicaja	12–4
Baxi Manresa	Champions League	Round of 16 Group J	1st of 4 teams (4–2)	12–4
Baxi Manresa	Champions League	Regular season Group B	1st of 4 teams (5–1)	12–4
Unicaja	Champions League	Quarter-finals	0–2 vs. (Spanish Basketball Federation) Baxi Manresa	6–6
Unicaja	Champions League	Round of 16 Group K	2nd of 3 teams (2–2)	6–6
Unicaja	Champions League	Regular season Group C	1st of 4 teams (4–2)	6–6
Casademont Zaragoza	FIBA Europe Cup	Regular season Group D	3rd of 4 teams (2–4)	2–4
