= 2021–22 Basketball Champions League playoffs =

Sport season

The 2021–22 Basketball Champions League playoffs began on April 5, 2022 and concluded with the 2022 Basketball Champions League Final Four, to decide the champions of the 2021–22 Basketball Champions League. A total of eight teams competed in the play-offs.

== Format ==
The 8 qualified clubs have been ranked according to their final position within their respective group during the Round of 16 and their place in the Draw was based on this ranking. The teams having finished 1st of their Round of 16 group was placed in Pot 1, the teams having finished 2nd of their Round of 16 group was placed in Pot 2. The draw was held on March 25, 2022.

The quarterfinals will be played in a best-of-3 series and start on April 5. The seeded teams will play their first (and potential third) game at home, the unseeded teams will play their second game at home.

The four winning clubs will qualify for the Final Four. The 4 qualified teams will play the final four between May 6–8, 2022.

== Qualified teams ==
Key to colors
Seeded teams	Unseeded teams

Group	Winners	Runners-up
I	(Israel) Hapoel Holon	(Germany) MHP Riesen Ludwigsburg
J	(Spain) Baxi Manresa	(Turkey) Tofaş
K	(Romania) U-BT Cluj-Napoca	(Spain) Unicaja
L	(Spain) Lenovo Tenerife	(France) SIG Strasbourg

== Bracket ==
Quarterfinals
(Romania) U-BT Cluj-Napoca	76	75	73
(Germany) MHP Riesen Ludwigsburg	73	92	79
(Spain) Baxi Manresa	86	91	—
(Spain) Unicaja	63	89	—
(Israel) Hapoel Holon	93	81	—
(France) SIG Strasbourg	75	80	—
(Spain) Lenovo Tenerife	78	74	—
(Turkey) Tofaş	77	73	—

Semifinals
6 May
(Germany) MHP Riesen Ludwigsburg	55
(Spain) Baxi Manresa	63
6 May
(Israel) Hapoel Holon	71
(Spain) Lenovo Tenerife	78

Final
8 May
(Spain) Baxi Manresa	87
(Spain) Lenovo Tenerife	98
Third place
8 May
(Germany) MHP Riesen Ludwigsburg	88
(Israel) Hapoel Holon	68

== Quarterfinals ==
Team 1	Series	Team 2	Game 1	Game 2	Game 3
U-BT Cluj-Napoca (Romania)	1–2	(Germany) MHP Riesen Ludwigsburg	76–73	75-92	73–79
Baxi Manresa (Spain)	2–0	(Spain) Unicaja	86–63	91–89	–
Hapoel Holon (Israel)	2–0	(France) SIG Strasbourg	93–75	81–80	–
Lenovo Tenerife (Spain)	2–0	(Turkey) Tofaş	78–77	74–73	–

=== U-BT Cluj-Napoca vs. Riesen Ludwigsburg ===
5 April 2022	U-BT Cluj-Napoca (Romania)	76–73 (Series: 1–0)	(Germany) MHP Riesen Ludwigsburg	Cluj-Napoca
18:00	Scoring by quarter: 18–13, 19–21, 18–22, 21–17
	Pts: Richard 14; Rebs: Guzmán, Hogue 8 Asts: Brown 7 Eff: Guzmán, Richard 15	Boxscore	Pts: Radebaugh 16; Rebs: four players 6 Asts: Simon 4 Eff: Happ 18	Arena: BTarena; Attendance: 9,887; Referees: Ademir Zurapovic, Nicolas Maestre, Kerem Baki

13 April 2022	MHP Riesen Ludwigsburg (Germany)	92–75 (Series: 1–1)	(Romania) U-BT Cluj-Napoca	Ludwigsburg
20:00	Scoring by quarter: 28–18, 24–24, 24–14, 16–19
	Pts: Happ, Radebaugh 18; Rebs: Simon 9 Asts: Radebaugh, Simon 4 Eff: Radebaugh, Simon 22	Boxscore	Pts: Stipanović 16; Rebs: Guzmán 7 Asts: Brown 8 Eff: Guzmán 18	Arena: MHP Arena; Referees: Yohan Rosso, Georgios Poursanidis, Boris Krejic

19 April 2022	U-BT Cluj-Napoca (Romania)	73–79 (Series: 1–2)	(Germany) MHP Riesen Ludwigsburg	Cluj-Napoca
18:00	Scoring by quarter: 11–16, 12–21, 19–19, 31–23
	Pts: Richard 18; Rebs: Stewart 8 Asts: Stipanović 5 Eff: Birčević 15	Boxscore	Pts: Hulls 21; Rebs: Happ, Polas Bartolo 5 Asts: four players 3 Eff: Hulls 23	Arena: BTarena; Referees: Manuel Mazzoni, Saverio Lanzarini, Mārtiņš Kozlovskis

=== Baxi Manresa vs. Unicaja ===
5 April 2022	Baxi Manresa (Spain)	86–63 (Series: 1–0)	(Spain) Unicaja	Manresa
20:30	Scoring by quarter: 29–4, 18–17, 20–22, 19–20
	Pts: Thomasson 16; Rebs: Moneke 11; Asts: Pérez 6 Eff: Moneke, Vaulet 19	Boxscore	Pts: Barreiro 16; Rebs: Kravić 6 Asts: Díaz 5 Eff: Díaz 16	Arena: Pavelló Nou Congost; Referees: Yohan Rosso, Zafer Yılmaz, Wojciech Liszka

12 April 2022	Unicaja (Spain)	89–91 (Series: 0–2)	(Spain) Baxi Manresa	Málaga
20:30	Scoring by quarter: 23–22, 19–28, 23–19, 24–22
	Pts: Barreiro 21; Rebs: Suárez 5 Asts: Brizuela 5 Eff: Barreiro 22	Boxscore	Pts: Moneke 24; Rebs: Bako 6 Asts: Pérez 8 Eff: Moneke 22	Arena: Palacio de Deportes José María Martín Carpena; Referees: Saverio Lanzarini, Oskars Lucis, Thomas Bissuel

=== Hapoel Holon vs. SIG Strasbourg ===
6 April 2022	Hapoel Holon (Israel)	93–75 (Series: 1–0)	(France) SIG Strasbourg	Holon
18:00	Scoring by quarter: 25–19, 21–20, 20–15, 27–21
	Pts: Johnson 18; Rebs: Johnson 9 Asts: Ragland 12; Eff: Johnson 23	Boxscore	Pts: Mitchell 18; Rebs: Morin 9 Asts: three players 3 Eff: Morin 18	Arena: Holon Toto Hall; Referees: Saverio Lanzarini, Luis Castillo, Carsten Straube

12 April 2022	SIG Strasbourg (France)	80–81 (Series: 0–2)	(Israel) Hapoel Holon	Strasbourg
20:00	Scoring by quarter: 25–16, 24–19, 12–27, 19–19
	Pts: Mitchell 24; Rebs: Cavalière 10; Asts: three players 3 Eff: Mitchell 20	Boxscore	Pts: McGee 21; Rebs: Dalton 7 Asts: McGee, Ragland 4 Eff: McGee 19	Arena: Rhénus Sport; Referees: Wojciech Liszka, Lorenzo Baldini, Mārtiņš Kozlovskis

=== Lenovo Tenerife vs. Tofaş ===
6 April 2022	Lenovo Tenerife (Spain)	78–77 (Series: 1–0)	(Turkey) Tofaş	Tenerife
20:30	Scoring by quarter: 31–17, 16–16, 19–24, 12–20
	Pts: Salin 27; Rebs: Shermadini 9 Asts: Huertas 6 Eff: Salin 25	Boxscore	Pts: three players 14; Rebs: Ennis, Simmons 6 Asts: five players 2 Eff: Uğurlu 15	Arena: Santiago Martín; Referees: Oskars Lucis, Boris Krejic, Lorenzo Baldini

12 April 2022	Tofaş (Turkey)	73–74 (Series: 0–2)	(Spain) Lenovo Tenerife	Bursa
18:00	Scoring by quarter: 16–21, 14–22, 20–18, 23–13
	Pts: Simmons 17; Rebs: Simmons 6 Asts: Cook, Cruz 4 Eff: Simmons 23	Boxscore	Pts: Huertas 15; Rebs: Doornekamp 9 Asts: Huertas 7 Eff: Doornekamp 19	Arena: Tofaş Nilüfer Spor Salonu; Referees: Manuel Mazzoni, Martin Horozov, Tomas Jasevičius
