= 2018–19 ACB season =

Liga Endesa^{1}
- Season: 2018–19
- Games played: 325
- Teams: 18

Regular season
- Season MVP: (Argentina) Nicolás Laprovíttola
- Relegated: Delteco GBC; Cafés Candelas Breogán

Finals
- Champions: Real Madrid (35th title)
- Runners-up: Barça Lassa
- Semi-finalists: Valencia Basket; Tecnyconta Zaragoza
- Finals MVP: (Argentina) Facundo Campazzo

Statistical leaders
Points	(Argentina) Nicolás Laprovíttola	17.2
Rebounds	(United States) Nik Caner-Medley	8.6
Assists	(Montenegro) Omar Cook & (Argentina) Nicolás Laprovíttola	6.4
Index Rating	(Georgia (country)) Tornike Shengelia	18.2

Records
- Biggest home win: Zaragoza 112–66 Joventut (25 November 2018)
- Biggest away win: Fuenlabrada 60–110 Baskonia (14 October 2018)
- Highest scoring: Real Madrid 105–107 Andorra (4 November 2018)
- Winning streak: 17 games Real Madrid
- Losing streak: 9 games UCAM Murcia; Monbus Obradoiro
- Highest attendance: 15,544; Baskonia 74–91 Real Madrid (30 December 2018)
- Lowest attendance: 1,722; GBC 85–91 Manresa (13 January 2019)
- ^{1} Sponsored league name, referring to Endesa.

The 2018–19 ACB season, also known as Liga Endesa for sponsorship reasons, was the 36th season of the Spanish basketball league. It started on 29 September 2018 with the first round of the regular season and ended on 21 June 2019 with the finals.

Real Madrid defended successfully the title and conquered its second consecutive league, 35th overall.

== Teams ==
=== Promotion and relegation (pre-season) ===
A total of 18 teams contested the league, including 16 sides from the 2017–18 season and two promoted from the 2017–18 LEB Oro. This include the top team from the LEB Oro, and the winners of the LEB Oro playoffs.

Teams promoted from LEB Oro

- Cafés Candelas Breogán
- Baxi Manresa

=== Venues and locations ===
Location of teams in 2018–19 ACB
Location of teams from the Canary Islands in 2018–19 ACB

Team	Home city	Arena	Capacity
Barça Lassa	Barcelona	Palau Blaugrana	7,585
Baxi Manresa	Manresa	Nou Congost	5,000
Cafés Candelas Breogán	Lugo	Pazo dos Deportes	5,310
Delteco GBC	San Sebastián	Donostia Arena	11,000
Divina Seguros Joventut	Badalona	Palau Municipal d'Esports	8,500
Herbalife Gran Canaria	Las Palmas	Gran Canaria Arena	9,870
Iberostar Tenerife	San Cristóbal de La Laguna	Santiago Martín	5,000
Kirolbet Baskonia	Vitoria-Gasteiz	Fernando Buesa Arena	15,504
Monbus Obradoiro	Santiago de Compostela	Multiusos Fontes do Sar	5,060
Montakit Fuenlabrada	Fuenlabrada	Fernando Martín	5,700
MoraBanc Andorra	Andorra la Vella	M.I. Govern Andorra	5,000
Movistar Estudiantes	Madrid	WiZink Center	13,109
Real Madrid	Madrid	WiZink Center	13,109
San Pablo Burgos	Burgos	Coliseum Burgos	9,352
Tecnyconta Zaragoza	Zaragoza	Pabellón Príncipe Felipe	10,744
UCAM Murcia	Murcia	Palacio de Deportes	7,454
Unicaja	Málaga	Martín Carpena	10,642
Valencia Basket	Valencia	Fuente de San Luis	9,000

=== Personnel and sponsorship ===
Team	Head coach	Captain	Kit manufacturer	Shirt sponsor
Barça Lassa	(Serbia) Svetislav Pešić	(Croatia) Ante Tomić	Nike	Lassa Tyres
Baxi Manresa	(Spain) Joan Peñarroya	(Spain) Álvaro Muñoz	Pentex	Baxi
Cafés Candelas Breogán	(Spain) Tito Díaz	(Spain) Salva Arco	Hummel	Cafés Candelas
Delteco GBC	(Spain) Sergio Valdeolmillos	(Spain) Xabi Oroz	Hummel	Delteco
Divina Seguros Joventut	(Spain) Carles Duran	(Spain) Albert Ventura	Spalding	Divina Pastora Seguros
Herbalife Gran Canaria	(Spain) Pedro Martínez	(Dominican Republic) Eulis Báez	Spalding	Herbalife
Iberostar Tenerife	(Spain) Txus Vidorreta	(Argentina) Nicolás Richotti	Austral	Iberostar
Kirolbet Baskonia	(Croatia) Velimir Perasović	(Georgia (country)) Tornike Shengelia	Kelme	Kirolbet
Monbus Obradoiro	(Spain) Moncho Fernández	(Spain) Pepe Pozas	Vive	Estrella Galicia 0,0
Montakit Fuenlabrada	(Spain) Jota Cuspinera	(Croatia) Marko Popović	Pentex	Montakit
MoraBanc Andorra	(Spain) Ibon Navarro	(Serbia) Oliver Stević	Spalding	MoraBanc, Andorra
Movistar Estudiantes	(Spain) Josep Maria Berrocal	(Spain) Édgar Vicedo	Joma	Movistar
Real Madrid	(Spain) Pablo Laso	(Spain) Felipe Reyes	Adidas	European University
San Pablo Burgos	(Spain) Diego Epifanio	(Spain) Javi Vega	Hummel	Inmobiliaria San Pablo, Burgos
Tecnyconta Zaragoza	(Spain) Porfirio Fisac	(Spain) Carlos Alocén	Mercury	Tecnyconta
UCAM Murcia	(Spain) Sito Alonso	(Spain) José Ángel Antelo	Nike	UCAM, Costa Cálida
Unicaja	(Spain) Luis Casimiro	(Spain) Carlos Suárez	Spalding	Unicaja, Málaga
Valencia Basket	(Spain) Jaume Ponsarnau	(Spain) Rafa Martínez	Luanvi	Cultura del Esfuerzo^{1}

Notes
1. Cultura del Esfuerzo (transl. "Culture of Effort") is the motto of the club.

=== Managerial changes ===
Team	Outgoing manager	Manner of departure	Date of vacancy	Position in table	Replaced with	Date of appointment
Delteco GBC	(Spain) Porfirio Fisac	Resigned	30 May 2018	Pre-season	(Spain) Sergio Valdeolmillos	21 June 2018
Movistar Estudiantes	(Spain) Salva Maldonado	End of contract	1 June 2018	Pre-season	(Spain) Josep Maria Berrocal	14 June 2018
Unicaja	(Spain) Joan Plaza	End of contract	4 June 2018	Pre-season	(Spain) Luis Casimiro	14 June 2018
Montakit Fuenlabrada	(Argentina) Néstor García	End of contract	4 June 2018	Pre-season	(Spain) Agustí Julbe	27 June 2018
MoraBanc Andorra	(Spain) Joan Peñarroya	End of contract	7 June 2018	Pre-season	(Spain) Ibon Navarro	12 June 2018
Valencia Basket	(Spain) Txus Vidorreta	End of contract	8 June 2018	Pre-season	(Spain) Jaume Ponsarnau	11 June 2018
Iberostar Tenerife	(Greece) Fotios Katsikaris	End of contract	11 June 2018	Pre-season	(Spain) Txus Vidorreta	11 June 2018
Tecnyconta Zaragoza	(Spain) Pep Cargol	End of contract	12 June 2018	Pre-season	(Spain) Porfirio Fisac	16 June 2017
UCAM Murcia	(Spain) Ibon Navarro	End of contract	12 June 2018	Pre-season	(Spain) Javier Juárez	21 June 2018
Herbalife Gran Canaria	(Spain) Luis Casimiro	End of contract	13 June 2018	Pre-season	(Spain) Salva Maldonado	26 June 2018
Baxi Manresa	(Spain) Diego Ocampo	Resigned	26 June 2018	Pre-season	(Spain) Joan Peñarroya	28 June 2018
Montakit Fuenlabrada	(Spain) Agustí Julbe	Sacked	15 October 2018	17th (1–3)	(Argentina) Néstor García	19 October 2018
Kirolbet Baskonia	(Spain) Pedro Martínez	Sacked	16 November 2018	3rd (6–2)	(Croatia) Velimir Perasović	16 November 2018
Herbalife Gran Canaria	(Spain) Salva Maldonado	Sacked	5 December 2018	14th (3–7)	(Spain) Víctor García	10 December 2018
UCAM Murcia	(Spain) Javier Juárez	Sacked	27 January 2019	17th (5–13)	(Spain) Sito Alonso	28 January 2019
Montakit Fuenlabrada	(Argentina) Néstor García	Resigned	9 February 2019	14th (7–12)	(Spain) Jota Cuspinera	12 February 2019
Herbalife Gran Canaria	(Spain) Víctor García	Sacked	12 March 2019	14th (7–15)	(Spain) Pedro Martínez	12 March 2019
Cafés Candelas Breogán	(Spain) Natxo Lezkano	Sacked	18 March 2019	17th (7–16)	(Spain) Tito Díaz	19 March 2019

== Season summary ==
On 30 September 2018, just in the first round and coming back Cafés Candelas Breogán 12 years later to the Liga ACB, their inaugural match against Divina Seguros Joventut was postponed due to problems with the main clock and the shot clocks.

== Regular season ==
=== League table ===
Pos	Team	Pld	W	L	PF	PA	PD	Qualification or relegation
1	Real Madrid	34	28	6	3026	2679	+347	Qualification to playoffs
2	Barça Lassa	34	27	7	2948	2590	+358	Qualification to playoffs
3	Kirolbet Baskonia	34	26	8	2927	2549	+378	Qualification to playoffs
4	Valencia Basket	34	23	11	2793	2673	+120	Qualification to playoffs
5	Unicaja	34	21	13	2843	2773	+70	Qualification to playoffs
6	Tecnyconta Zaragoza	34	18	16	2822	2897	−75	Qualification to playoffs
7	Divina Seguros Joventut	34	18	16	2754	2733	+21	Qualification to playoffs
8	Baxi Manresa	34	17	17	2732	2794	−62	Qualification to playoffs
9	Iberostar Tenerife	34	17	17	2772	2710	+62	
10	MoraBanc Andorra	34	16	18	2815	2785	+30	
11	San Pablo Burgos	34	15	19	2816	2839	−23	
12	Herbalife Gran Canaria	34	14	20	2828	2873	−45	
13	Montakit Fuenlabrada	34	13	21	2788	3021	−233	
14	UCAM Murcia	34	12	22	2661	2785	−124	
15	Monbus Obradoiro	34	11	23	2645	2823	−178	
16	Movistar Estudiantes	34	11	23	2813	2981	−168	
17	Delteco GBC (R)	34	10	24	2558	2791	−233	Relegation to LEB Oro
18	Cafés Candelas Breogán (R)	34	9	25	2623	2868	−245	Relegation to LEB Oro

Source: ACB
(R) Relegated

=== Positions by round ===
The table lists the positions of teams after completion of each round. In order to preserve chronological evolvements, any postponed matches are not included in the round at which they were originally scheduled, but added to the full round they were played immediately afterwards. For example, if a match is scheduled for round 13, but then postponed and played between rounds 16 and 17, it will be added to the standings for round 16.

Team ╲ Round	1	2	3	4	5	6	7	8	9	10	11	12	13	14	15	16	17	18	19	20	21	22	23	24	25	26	27	28	29	30	31	32	33	34
Real Madrid	4	1	1	2	2	1	2	2	1	3	3	3	3	2	3	3	2	2	3	2	2	2	2	2	2	2	2	2	2	2	1	1	1	1
Barça Lassa	2	2	2	1	1	2	3	1	2	1	1	1	1	1	1	1	1	1	1	1	1	1	1	1	1	1	1	1	1	1	3	3	3	2
Kirolbet Baskonia	1	6	3	3	3	3	1	3	3	2	2	2	2	3	2	2	3	3	2	3	3	3	3	3	3	3	3	3	3	3	2	2	2	3
Valencia Basket	14	18	14	8	11	6	8	7	10	9	7	7	6	5	6	6	6	4	6	6	5	4	5	4	5	5	5	4	4	4	4	4	4	4
Unicaja	5	3	5	4	4	4	4	4	4	4	4	4	4	4	4	4	5	6	5	4	6	5	6	5	4	4	4	5	5	5	5	5	5	5
Tecnyconta Zaragoza	18	11	7	10	15	16	13	10	8	7	8	8	9	9	9	9	10	10	10	10	9	10	10	10	9	8	8	7	8	8	6	6	9	6
Divina Seguros Joventut	9	14	10	14	6	7	6	6	6	10	9	9	8	8	7	8	7	7	8	7	4	6	4	6	6	6	6	8	7	6	8	7	7	7
Baxi Manresa	7	9	13	7	9	8	7	8	7	6	6	6	5	7	8	7	8	8	7	8	8	7	7	7	8	7	7	6	6	7	9	9	8	8
Iberostar Tenerife	15	8	4	5	5	5	5	5	5	5	5	5	7	6	5	5	4	5	4	5	7	8	8	8	10	11	9	9	9	9	7	8	6	9
MoraBanc Andorra	8	4	6	6	12	12	10	9	9	8	10	11	12	11	11	10	9	9	9	9	10	9	9	9	7	9	10	10	10	10	10	10	10	10
San Pablo Burgos	13	10	15	16	10	11	9	11	13	11	13	15	11	10	10	11	13	14	12	12	12	12	11	11	12	10	11	11	11	11	11	11	11	11
Herbalife Gran Canaria	17	17	11	15	8	10	16	16	16	14	16	14	15	16	14	15	12	13	15	16	16	14	14	15	14	14	13	14	12	12	12	12	12	12
Montakit Fuenlabrada	3	7	12	17	14	15	12	13	11	12	11	13	14	15	17	14	16	16	14	15	15	16	15	14	13	13	15	12	14	14	13	13	13	13
UCAM Murcia	12	13	16	11	16	17	14	15	12	13	12	10	10	12	15	16	17	17	17	17	17	17	16	16	16	16	16	17	16	17	16	14	14	14
Monbus Obradoiro	6	5	8	9	13	14	11	12	14	15	14	12	13	13	13	12	11	12	11	11	11	11	12	12	11	12	12	13	13	13	14	15	15	15
Movistar Estudiantes	11	12	9	12	7	9	15	14	15	16	15	16	17	17	16	17	14	11	13	13	13	13	13	13	15	15	14	15	15	15	15	16	16	16
Delteco GBC	16	16	18	18	18	18	18	17	18	18	18	18	18	18	18	18	18	18	18	18	18	18	18	18	18	18	18	18	17	16	17	17	17	17
Cafés Candelas Breogán	9	15	17	13	17	13	17	18	17	17	17	17	16	14	12	13	15	15	16	14	14	15	17	17	17	17	17	16	18	18	18	18	18	18

Leader
Qualification to playoffs
Relegation to LEB Oro

Source: ACB

=== Results ===
Home \ Away	BAR	BAX	BRE	GBC	JOV	HGC	IBT	KBA	MOB	MKF	MBA	MOV	RMB	SPB	TZA	UCM	UNI	VBC
Barça Lassa	—	107–71	94–80	88–71	94–92	98–78	77–73	72–84	79–73	106–76	67–63	90–76	86–69	97–88	99–55	105–73	94–83	72–78
Baxi Manresa	78–88	—	72–63	84–74	66–67	86–79	91–87	66–82	75–72	86–77	64–77	101–91	78–83	83–86	94–73	86–96	87–96	75–66
Cafés Candelas Breogán	75–92	71–80	—	83–71	69–76	77–92	84–85	72–90	69–56	92–96	85–79	88–79	84–71	76–95	82–86	77–73	83–75	65–77
Delteco GBC	71–104	85–91	100–65	—	89–86	74–63	73–79	77–87	85–72	60–76	72–84	93–92	76–95	92–83	73–78	67–81	80–94	66–67
Divina Seguros Joventut	89–77	86–70	81–88	88–64	—	88–75	84–64	67–68	83–79	78–88	65–75	86–78	74–83	88–85	88–73	86–94	93–86	83–74
Herbalife Gran Canaria	77–97	76–84	96–72	85–90	83–68	—	77–91	83–101	92–93	91–75	106–80	85–79	71–77	74–81	84–79	90–82	85–76	111–92
Iberostar Tenerife	63–57	77–75	90–78	60–67	79–72	86–90	—	70–63	78–52	96–65	87–83	73–81	82–91	83–88	86–88	83–76	85–92	100–66
Kirolbet Baskonia	73–82	82–71	100–78	85–66	87–81	91–76	85–68	—	72–63	101–92	84–82	104–67	74–91	87–79	99–76	93–49	112–95	77–56
Monbus Obradoiro	63–83	90–97	75–73	88–82	77–84	82–96	79–90	74–81	—	101–104	69–68	91–81	73–86	91–81	84–91	91–79	89–86	78–81
Montakit Fuenlabrada	79–73	94–89	95–98	70–69	74–106	88–93	88–84	60–110	84–83	—	79–85	93–92	80–95	80–89	87–88	101–93	79–93	94–89
MoraBanc Andorra	79–82	77–82	91–84	76–87	102–89	99–85	81–96	93–73	91–72	89–88	—	96–82	66–87	97–88	97–99	78–76	84–95	72–73
Movistar Estudiantes	84–101	77–79	95–62	86–62	69–83	86–96	98–96	67–100	83–80	77–75	91–90	—	93–88	80–79	87–72	86–110	72–80	79–83
Real Madrid	76–82	91–57	94–89	104–71	92–69	87–63	88–73	82–76	94–70	89–79	105–107	109–92	—	90–77	98–96	80–74	89–82	83–77
San Pablo Burgos	80–85	74–82	92–76	96–73	65–87	89–87	79–68	82–79	76–84	99–76	66–62	102–82	84–102	—	79–93	84–73	88–79	77–87
Tecnyconta Zaragoza	86–91	83–74	83–69	76–73	112–66	71–69	102–93	81–79	78–86	77–80	77–97	91–85	70–85	89–81	—	88–68	72–70	89–91
UCAM Murcia	71–70	79–84	76–64	61–74	73–78	82–77	91–96	75–86	80–58	75–65	67–77	73–88	80–82	72–62	116–94	—	78–76	68–81
Unicaja	78–73	99–97	78–72	87–69	88–63	89–76	61–78	64–81	74–63	89–84	72–66	82–76	103–102	91–70	98–82	89–82	—	86–73
Valencia Basket	85–86	89–76	83–82	77–62	93–80	83–67	88–73	92–81	87–94	86–67	91–72	90–82	70–88	94–92	89–74	89–65	96–57	—

Source: ACB
Legend: Blue = home team win; Red = away team win.

== Playoffs ==
Quarterfinals
1 Real Madrid	98	88
8 Baxi Manresa	75	73
4 Valencia Basket	78	76	79
5 Unicaja	85	69	76
2 Barça Lassa	87	107
7 Divina Seguros Joventut	61	86
3 Kirolbet Baskonia	81	69
6 Tecnyconta Zaragoza	91	76

Semifinals
1 Real Madrid	94	79	85
4 Valencia Basket	72	66	78
2 Barça Lassa	101	76	96
6 Tecnyconta Zaragoza	59	70	81

Finals
1 Real Madrid	87	81	77	74
2 Barça Lassa	67	80	78	68

== Final standings ==
Pos	Team	Pld	W	L	Qualification or relegation
1	Real Madrid (C)	43	36	7	Already qualified to EuroLeague
2	Barça Lassa	43	33	10	Already qualified to EuroLeague
3	Valencia Basket	40	25	15	Already qualified to EuroLeague
4	Tecnyconta Zaragoza	39	20	19	Qualification to Champions League regular season
5	Kirolbet Baskonia	36	26	10	Already qualified to EuroLeague
6	Unicaja	37	22	15	Qualification to EuroCup
7	Divina Seguros Joventut	36	18	18	Qualification to EuroCup
8	Baxi Manresa	36	17	19	Qualification to Champions League regular season
9	Iberostar Tenerife	34	17	17	Qualification to Champions League regular season
10	MoraBanc Andorra	34	16	18	Qualification to EuroCup
11	San Pablo Burgos	34	15	19	Qualification to Champions League second qualifying round
12	Herbalife Gran Canaria	34	14	20	
13	Montakit Fuenlabrada	34	13	21	
14	UCAM Murcia	34	12	22	
15	Monbus Obradoiro	34	11	23	
16	Movistar Estudiantes	34	11	23	
17	Delteco GBC (R)	34	10	24	Relegation to LEB Oro
18	Cafés Candelas Breogán (R)	34	9	25	Relegation to LEB Oro

Source: ACB
(C) Champions; (R) Relegated

== Attendances ==
Attendances include playoff games:

Pos	Team	Total	High	Low	Average	Change
1	San Pablo Burgos	155,605	9,316	8,825	9,153	+0.9%
2	Kirolbet Baskonia	164,645	15,544	6,429	9,147	−10.3%
3	Real Madrid	191,995	12,247	7,139	8,727	+1.7%
4	Movistar Estudiantes	146,388	12,165	5,219	8,611	+5.7%
5	Tecnyconta Zaragoza	150,174	10,106	5,789	7,904	+3.1%
6	Unicaja	136,298	10,208	5,147	7,572	+4.6%
7	Valencia Basket	145,467	7,912	6,259	7,273	+0.3%
8	UCAM Murcia	95,280	7,708	4,797	5,605	+0.5%
9	Barça Lassa	117,116	7,301	3,769	5,323	+11.1%
10	Herbalife Gran Canaria	89,467	7,349	1,849	5,263	−10.3%
11	Divina Seguros Joventut	93,943	9,912	2,240	5,219	+4.7%
12	Montakit Fuenlabrada	86,930	5,489	4,716	5,114	−1.2%
13	Monbus Obradoiro	83,345	6,024	3,890	4,903	−1.6%
14	Cafés Candelas Breogán	82,922	5,327	4,058	4,878	n/a^{1}
15	Baxi Manresa	84,695	5,000	4,450	4,705	n/a^{1}
16	Iberostar Tenerife	77,896	5,183	3,716	4,582	−1.7%
17	MoraBanc Andorra	68,778	4,500	3,518	4,046	−4.2%
18	Delteco GBC	55,816	6,486	1,722	3,283	+3.6%
	League total	2,026,760	15,544	1,722	6,236	−3.0%

Source: ACB
Notes:
1: Team played last season in LEB Oro.

== Awards ==
All official awards of the 2018–19 ACB season.

=== MVP ===
Pos.	Player	Team
PG	(Argentina) Nicolás Laprovíttola	Divina Seguros Joventut

=== Finals MVP ===
Pos.	Player	Team
PG	(Argentina) Facundo Campazzo	Real Madrid

=== All-ACB Teams ===
Pos.	First Team		Second Team	
Pos.	Player	Team	Player	Team
PG	(Argentina) Nicolás Laprovíttola	Divina Seguros Joventut	(France) Thomas Heurtel	Barça Lassa
SG	(Argentina) Facundo Campazzo	Real Madrid	(Spain) Jaime Fernández	Unicaja
SF	(Nigeria) Stan Okoye	Tecnyconta Zaragoza	(Spain) Javier Beirán	Iberostar Tenerife
PF	(Montenegro) Bojan Dubljević	Valencia Basket	(Georgia (country)) Tornike Shengelia	Kirolbet Baskonia
C	(Cape Verde) Edy Tavares	Real Madrid	(France) Vincent Poirier	Kirolbet Baskonia

=== Best Latin American Player ===
Pos.	Player	Team
PG	(Argentina) Nicolás Laprovíttola	Divina Seguros Joventut

=== Best Young Player Award ===
Pos.	Player	Team
PG	(Spain) Carlos Alocén	Tecnyconta Zaragoza

=== Best All-Young Team ===
Pos.	Player	Team
PG	(Spain) Carlos Alocén	Tecnyconta Zaragoza
SG	(Spain) Xabier López-Arostegui	Divina Seguros Joventut
SF	(Slovenia) Vlatko Čančar	San Pablo Burgos
PF	(Spain) Santiago Yusta	Real Madrid
C	(Democratic Republic of the Congo) Jordan Sakho	Baxi Manresa

=== Best Coach ===
Coach	Team
(Serbia) Svetislav Pešić	Barça Lassa

=== Player of the round ===
Round	Player	Team	PIR
1	(Georgia (country)) Tornike Shengelia	Kirolbet Baskonia	31
2	(Georgia (country)) Thad McFadden	Iberostar Tenerife	33
3	(United States) Will Thomas	Valencia Basket	36
4	(United States) Darrun Hilliard	Kirolbet Baskonia	28
5	(France) Vincent Poirier	Kirolbet Baskonia	26
6	(Montenegro) Bojan Dubljević	Valencia Basket	34
7	(Argentina) Nicolás Laprovíttola	Divina Seguros Joventut	28
8	(Spain) Jaime Fernández	Unicaja	35
9	(Spain) Javier Beirán	Iberostar Tenerife	32
10	(North Macedonia) Bo McCalebb	Tecnyconta Zaragoza	28
11	(Greece) Kostas Vasileiadis	Monbus Obradoiro	31
12	(Slovakia) Vladimír Brodziansky	Monbus Obradoiro	37
13	(United States) Ryan Toolson	Baxi Manresa	27
13	(Nigeria) Stan Okoye	Tecnyconta Zaragoza	27
14	(France) Kevin Séraphin	Barça Lassa	30
14	(United States) Colton Iverson	Iberostar Tenerife	30
15	(Croatia) Ante Tomić	Barça Lassa	37
16	(United States) Colton Iverson (2)	Iberostar Tenerife	33
17	(Spain) Javier Beirán (2)	Iberostar Tenerife	25
17	(Slovakia) Vladimír Brodziansky (2)	Monbus Obradoiro	25
17	(Greece) Kostas Vasileiadis (2)	Monbus Obradoiro	25
18	(Argentina) Nicolás Laprovíttola (2)	Divina Seguros Joventut	34
19	(Spain) Jaime Fernández (2)	Unicaja	34
20	(Ukraine) Volodymyr Gerun	Cafés Candelas Breogán	37
21	(France) Vincent Poirier (2)	Kirolbet Baskonia	34
22	(United States) Brian Roberts	Unicaja	28
23	(United States) Askia Booker	UCAM Murcia	48
24	(Bulgaria) E. J. Rowland	Montakit Fuenlabrada	28
24	(Jamaica) Dylan Ennis	MoraBanc Andorra	28
24	(United States) Matt Thomas	Valencia Basket	28
25	(Nigeria) Stan Okoye (2)	Tecnyconta Zaragoza	32
26	(Spain) Nacho Martín	Tecnyconta Zaragoza	34
27	(Azerbaijan) Nik Caner-Medley	Movistar Estudiantes	35
28	(Spain) Dani Pérez	Delteco GBC	36
29	(United States) Askia Booker (2)	UCAM Murcia	38
30	(France) Thomas Heurtel	Barça Lassa	28
31	(United States) Askia Booker (3)	UCAM Murcia	35
32	(Cape Verde) Edy Tavares	Real Madrid	27
32	(United States) Mike Tobey	Valencia Basket	27
33	(United States) Jacob Wiley	Herbalife Gran Canaria	33
34	(France) Louis Labeyrie	Valencia Basket	34

=== Player of the month ===
Month	Rounds	Player	Team	PIR	Ref
October	1–6	(Georgia (country)) Tornike Shengelia	Kirolbet Baskonia	19.8	
November	7–10	(Spain) Javier Beirán	Iberostar Tenerife	21.25	
December	11–14	(Greece) Kostas Vasileiadis	Monbus Obradoiro	22.6	
January	15–18	(United States) Colton Iverson	Iberostar Tenerife	23.5	
February	19–20	(Georgia (country)) Giorgi Shermadini	Unicaja	27.0	
February	19–20	(United States) Dominique Sutton	San Pablo Burgos	27.0	
March	21–25	(Senegal) Moussa Diagne	MoraBanc Andorra	20.5	
April	26–29	(Argentina) Facundo Campazzo	Real Madrid	22.7	

== ACB clubs in European competitions ==
Team	Competition	Progress
Real Madrid	EuroLeague	3rd (26–9)
Barça Lassa	EuroLeague	5th (20–15)
Kirolbet Baskonia	EuroLeague	7th (16–18)
Herbalife Gran Canaria	EuroLeague	14th (8–22)
Valencia Basket	EuroCup	Champions
MoraBanc Andorra	EuroCup	Semifinals
Unicaja	EuroCup	Quarterfinals
Iberostar Tenerife	Champions League	Runners-up
UCAM Murcia	Champions League	Round of 16
Montakit Fuenlabrada	Champions League	Regular season
Movistar Estudiantes	Champions League	Second qualifying round
