= 2019 ACB Playoffs =

Tournament details
- Country: Spain
- Dates: 30 May 2019 – 23 June 2019
- Teams: 8
- Defending champions: Real Madrid

Final positions
- Champions: Real Madrid (35th title)
- Runner-up: Barça Lassa
- Semifinalists: Valencia Basket; Tecnyconta Zaragoza

Tournament statistics
- Matches played: 19
- Attendance: 154,801 (8,147 per match)

The 2019 ACB Playoffs, also known as 2019 Liga Endesa Playoffs for sponsorship reasons, was the postseason tournament of the ACB's 2018–19 season, which began on 27 September 2018. The playoffs started on 30 May 2019 and ended on 21 June 2019 with the Finals.

Real Madrid defended successfully the title and conquered its second consecutive league, 35th overall.

== Format ==
At the end of the regular season, the eight teams with the most wins qualify for the playoffs. The seedings are based on each team's record.

The bracket is fixed; there is no reseeding. The quarterfinals are best-of-three series; the team that wins two games advances to the next round. This round is in a 1–1–1 format. From the semifinals onward, the rounds are best-of-five series; the team that wins three games advances to the next round. These rounds, including the Finals, are in a 2–2–1 format. Home court advantage in any round belong to the higher-seeded team.

== Playoff qualifying ==
On 31 March 2019, Barça Lassa became the first team to clinch a playoff spot.

Seed	Team	Record	Clinched		
Seed	Team	Record	Playoff berth	Seeded team	Top seed
1	Real Madrid	28–6	13 April	2 May	26 May
2	Barça Lassa	27–7	31 March	21 April	–
3	Kirolbet Baskonia	26–8	20 April	3 May	–
4	Valencia Basket	23–11	4 May	11 May	–
5	Unicaja	21–13	9 May	–	–
6	Tecnyconta Zaragoza	18–16	26 May	–	–
7	Divina Seguros Joventut	18–16	26 May	–	–
8	Baxi Manresa	17–17	26 May	–	–

== Bracket ==
Teams in bold advance to the next round. The numbers to the left of each team indicate the team's seeding, and the numbers to the right indicate the result of games including result in bold of the team that won in that game.

Quarterfinals
**1** Real Madrid	**98**	**88**
**8** Baxi Manresa	75	73
**4** Valencia Basket	78	**76**	**79**
**5** Unicaja	**85**	69	76
**2** Barça Lassa	**87**	**107**
**7** Divina Seguros Joventut	61	86
**3** Kirolbet Baskonia	81	69
**6** Tecnyconta Zaragoza	**91**	**76**

Semifinals
**1** Real Madrid	**94**	**79**	**85**
**4** Valencia Basket	72	66	78
**2** Barça Lassa	**101**	**76**	**96**
**6** Tecnyconta Zaragoza	59	70	81

Finals
**1** Real Madrid	**87**	**81**	77	**74**
**2** Barça Lassa	67	80	**78**	68

== Quarterfinals ==
All times are in Central European Summer Time (UTC+02:00)

=== Real Madrid v Baxi Manresa ===
30 May 2019	**Real Madrid**	**98**–75 (Series: **1–0**)	Baxi Manresa	Madrid
21:15	Scoring by quarter: **29**–15, **24**–22, **25**–21, **20**–17
	Pts: Randolph 15; Rebs: Campazzo 7 Asts: Llull 8 PIR: Ayón, Campazzo 17	Boxscore	Pts: Lalanne 26; Rebs: Tomàs 7 Asts: Lundberg 6 PIR: Lalanne 20	Arena: WiZink Center; Attendance: 7,465; Referees: Carlos Cortés, Luis Miguel Castillo, Alberto Sánchez Sixto

2 June 2019	Baxi Manresa	73–**88** (Series: **0–2**)	**Real Madrid**	Manresa
21:30	Scoring by quarter: 11–**26**, 17–**21**, 17–**24**, **28**–17
	Pts: García 13; Rebs: Lalanne 6 Asts: Lundberg 7 PIR: García 15	Boxscore	Pts: Campazzo 14; Rebs: Tavares 9 Asts: Campazzo 7 PIR: Campazzo 27	Arena: Nou Congost; Attendance: 4,950; Referees: Antonio Conde, Jorge Martínez, Jacobo Rial

Regular season series
Madrid won 2–0 in the regular season series

20 January 2018

Boxscore

Baxi Manresa	78–**83**	**Real Madrid**

Nou Congost, Manresa

17 March 2019

Boxscore

**Real Madrid**	**91**–57	Baxi Manresa

WiZink Center, Madrid

This was the fourth playoff meeting between these two teams, with Real Madrid winning two of the first three meetings.

Previous playoff series
Madrid leads 2–1 in all-time playoff series

1994

**Real Madrid Teka**	**2**–1	Tdk Manresa

1994 Quarterfinals

1997

**Real Madrid Teka**	**3**–0	Tdk Manresa

1997 Quarterfinals

1998

Real Madrid Teka	1–**3**	**Tdk Manresa**

1998 Semifinals

=== Barça Lassa v Divina Seguros Joventut ===
31 May 2019	**Barça Lassa**	**87**–61 (Series: **1–0**)	Divina Seguros Joventut	Barcelona
21:30	Scoring by quarter: **29**–20, 6–**11**, **25**–15, **27**–15
	Pts: Heurtel 17; Rebs: Tomić 11; Asts: Heurtel 3 PIR: Singleton 25	Boxscore	Pts: Boungou Colo 13; Rebs: López-Arostegui 6 Asts: Ventura 5 PIR: Boungou Colo 12	Arena: Palau Blaugrana; Attendance: 6,395; Referees: Fernando Calatrava, Juan de Dios Oyón, Alfonso Olivares

2 June 2019	Divina Seguros Joventut	86–**107** (Series: **0–2**)	**Barça Lassa**	Badalona
19:00	Scoring by quarter: 19–**28**, **21**–20, 25–**31**, 21–**28**
	Pts: Laprovíttola 22; Rebs: Todorović 6 Asts: Laprovíttola 11; PIR: Laprovíttola 41	Boxscore	Pts: Heurtel 32; Rebs: Hanga 7 Asts: Heurtel 9 PIR: Heurtel 44	Arena: Palau Municipal d'Esports; Attendance: 7,114; Referees: Daniel Hierrezuelo, Rafael Serrano, Francisco José Araña

Regular season series
Tied 1–1 in the regular season series

28 October 2018

Boxscore

**Barça Lassa**	**94**–92	Divina Seguros Joventut

Palau Blaugrana, Barcelona

28 April 2019

Boxscore

**Divina Seguros Joventut**	**89**–77	Barça Lassa

Palau Municipal d'Esports, Badalona

This was the 12th playoff meeting between these two teams, with Barça Lassa winning eight of the first 11 meetings.

Previous playoff series
Barça leads 8–3 in all-time playoff series

1985

FC Barcelona	1–**2**	**Ron Negrita Joventut**

1985 Semifinals

1986

**FC Barcelona**	**2**–1	Ron Negrita Joventut

1986 Semifinals

1987

**FC Barcelona**	**3**–1	Ron Negrita Joventut

1987 Finals

1988

**FC Barcelona**	**3**–2	Ram Joventut

1988 Semifinals

1990

**FC Barcelona**	**3**–0	Ram Joventut Badalona

1990 Finals

1991

**Montigalá Joventut**	**3**–1	FC Barcelona

1991 Finals

1993

**Marbella Joventut**	**3**–2	FC Barcelona Banca Catalana

1993 Semifinals

1994

**FC Barcelona Banca Catalana**	**3**–2	7Up Joventut

1994 Semifinals

1998

Festina Joventut	1–**3**	**FC Barcelona Banca Catalana**

1998 Quarterfinals

2008

DKV Joventut	0–**2**	**AXA FC Barcelona**

2008 Semifinals

2015

**FC Barcelona**	**2**–0	FIATC Joventut

2015 Quarterfinals

=== Kirolbet Baskonia v Tecnyconta Zaragoza ===
30 May 2019	Kirolbet Baskonia	81–**91** (Series: **0–1**)	**Tecnyconta Zaragoza**	Vitoria-Gasteiz
20:15	Scoring by quarter: 20–**24**, 14–**26**, 19–**22**, **28**–19
	Pts: Granger, Poirier 21; Rebs: Shengelia 7 Asts: Granger, Vildoza 4 PIR: Poirier 26	Boxscore	Pts: Okoye 22; Rebs: Okoye 7 Asts: Alocén, Seibutis 6 PIR: Okoye 28	Arena: Fernando Buesa Arena; Attendance: 9,145; Referees: Antonio Conde, Óscar Perea, Arnau Padrós

2 June 2019	**Tecnyconta Zaragoza**	**76**–69 (Series: **2–0**)	Kirolbet Baskonia	Zaragoza
12:30	Scoring by quarter: **26**–9, 12–**24**, 11–**22**, **27**–14
	Pts: Radović 16; Rebs: Radović 6 Asts: Alocén, Seibutis 3 PIR: Radović 21	Boxscore	Pts: Granger 14; Rebs: three players 5 Asts: Granger 4 PIR: Granger 16	Arena: Pabellón Príncipe Felipe; Attendance: 9,622; Referees: José Antonio Martín Bertrán, Vicente Bultó, Raúl Zamorano

Regular season series
Tied 1–1 in the regular season series

29 September 2018

Boxscore

**Kirolbet Baskonia**	**99**–76	Tecnyconta Zaragoza

Fernando Buesa Arena, Vitoria-Gasteiz

24 March 2019

Boxscore

**Tecnyconta Zaragoza**	**81**–79	Kirolbet Baskonia

Pabellón Príncipe Felipe, Zaragoza

This was the first meeting in the playoffs between Kirolbet Baskonia and Tecnyconta Zaragoza.

=== Valencia Basket v Unicaja ===
31 May 2019	Valencia Basket	78–**85** (Series: **0–1**)	**Unicaja**	Valencia
19:15	Scoring by quarter: 27–**30**, **16**–10, 17–**25**, 18–**20**
	Pts: Van Rossom 15; Rebs: Labeyrie 6 Asts: Van Rossom 7 PIR: W. Thomas 15	Boxscore	Pts: Milosavljević 28; Rebs: Díaz, Wiltjer 6 Asts: Fernández 5 PIR: Milosavljević 29	Arena: Fuente de San Luis; Attendance: 7,649; Referees: Carlos Peruga, Jordi Aliaga, Javier Torres

2 June 2019	Unicaja	69–**76** (Series: **1–1**)	**Valencia Basket**	Málaga
16:30	Scoring by quarter: 12–**20**, **20**–17, **21**–15, 16–**24**
	Pts: Lessort 12; Rebs: Lessort 8 Asts: Díaz 3 PIR: Lessort 16	Boxscore	Pts: Tobey 14; Rebs: Abalde 6 Asts: Van Rossom 5 PIR: San Emeterio 17	Arena: Martín Carpena; Attendance: 9,055; Referees: Juan Carlos García González, Sergio Manuel, Martín Caballero

4 June 2019	**Valencia Basket**	**79**–76 (Series: **2–1**)	Unicaja	Valencia
21:00	Scoring by quarter: **25**–10, 17–**21**, 16–**20**, 21–**25**
	Pts: Tobey 7 Rebs: Dubljević 6 Asts: Van Rossom 7 PIR: Vives 17	Boxscore	Pts: Shermadini 14; Rebs: Suárez 7 Asts: Fernández 5 PIR: Shermadini, Suárez 16	Arena: Fuente de San Luis; Attendance: 7,848; Referees: José Antonio Martín Bertrán, Carlos Peruga, Luis Miguel Castillo

Regular season series
Tied 1–1 in the regular season series

28 September 2018

Boxscore

**Unicaja**	**86**–73	Valencia Basket

Martín Carpena, Málaga

24 April 2019

Boxscore

**Valencia Basket**	**96**–57	Unicaja

Fuente de San Luis, Valencia

This was the sixth playoff meeting between these two teams, with Unicaja winning three of the first five meetings.

Previous playoff series
Unicaja leads 3–2 in all-time playoff series

2001

**Unicaja**	**3**–1	Pamesa Valencia

2001 Quarterfinals

2003

**Pamesa Valencia**	**3**–2	Unicaja

2003 Semifinals

2004

Pamesa Cerámica Valencia	2–**3**	**Unicaja**

2004 Quarterfinals

2010

Power Electronics Valencia	0–**2**	**Unicaja**

2010 Quarterfinals

2016

**Valencia Basket**	**2**–0	Unicaja

2016 Quarterfinals

== Semifinals ==
All times are in Central European Summer Time (UTC+02:00)

=== Real Madrid v Valencia Basket ===
6 June 2018	**Real Madrid**	**94**–72 (Series: **1–0**)	Valencia Basket	Madrid
21:00	Scoring by quarter: **26**–18, **22**–15, **26**–13, 20–**26**
	Pts: Randolph 24; Rebs: Randolph 6 Asts: Campazzo 6 PIR: Randolph 30	Boxscore	Pts: Doornekamp 15; Rebs: Dubljević 7 Asts: Vives 4 PIR: Doornekamp 25	Arena: WiZink Center; Attendance: 8,733; Referees: Daniel Hierrezuelo, Carlos Cortés, Juan de Dios Oyón

8 June 2018	**Real Madrid**	**79**–66 (Series: **2–0**)	Valencia Basket	Madrid
21:00	Scoring by quarter: 14–**22**, **28**–14, **26**–16, 11–**14**
	Pts: Llull 13; Rebs: Ayón 8 Asts: Fernández 5 PIR: Ayón 18	Boxscore	Pts: Dubljević, Tobey 12; Rebs: Labeyrie, W. Thomas 8 Asts: Sastre, Van Rossom 3 PIR: W. Thomas, Tobey 16	Arena: WiZink Center; Attendance: 9,373; Referees: José Antonio Martín Bertrán, Fernando Calatrava, Rafael Serrano

10 June 2019	Valencia Basket	78–**85** (Series: **0–3**)	**Real Madrid**	Valencia
21:00	Scoring by quarter: 19–**20**, **19**–15, 22–**28**, 18–**22**
	Pts: Dubljević 19; Rebs: Tobey 9 Asts: Sastre 3 PIR: Dubljević 18	Boxscore	Pts: Fernández 16; Rebs: Randolph 9 Asts: three players 4 PIR: Randolph 24	Arena: Fuente de San Luis; Attendance: 7,809; Referees: Antonio Conde, Carlos Cortés, Vicente Bultó

Regular season series
Madrid won 2–0 in the regular season series

5 October 2018

Boxscore

Valencia Basket	70–**88**	**Real Madrid**

Fuente de San Luis, Valencia

21 May 2019

Boxscore

**Real Madrid**	**83**–77	Valencia Basket

WiZink Center, Madrid

This was the sixth playoff meeting between these two teams, with Real Madrid winning four of the first five meetings.

Previous playoff series
Madrid leads 4–1 in all-time playoff series

1998

**Real Madrid Teka**	**3**–1	Pamesa Valencia

1998 Quarterfinals

2007

**Real Madrid**	**3**–1	Pamesa Valencia

2007 Quarterfinals

2015

**Real Madrid**	**3**–1	Valencia Basket

2015 Semifinals

2016

**Real Madrid**	**3**–1	Valencia Basket

2016 Semifinals

2017

Real Madrid	1–**3**	**Valencia Basket**

2017 Finals

=== Barça Lassa v Tecnyconta Zaragoza ===
7 June 2018	**Barça Lassa**	**101**–59 (Series: **1–0**)	Tecnyconta Zaragoza	Barcelona
21:00	Scoring by quarter: **26**–14, **25**–12, **24**–11, **26**–22
	Pts: Kuric 25; Rebs: Singleton 8 Asts: Heurtel 8 PIR: Kuric 28	Boxscore	Pts: Barreiro, Seibutis 9 Rebs: Justiz 7 Asts: Alocén 3 PIR: McCalebb 10	Arena: Palau Blaugrana; Attendance: 5,679; Referees: Antonio Conde, Óscar Perea, Jacobo Rial

9 June 2018	**Barça Lassa**	**76**–70 (Series: **2–0**)	Tecnyconta Zaragoza	Barcelona
21:00	Scoring by quarter: 14–**21**, **22**–19, **25**–11, 15–**19**
	Pts: Heurtel 21; Rebs: Oriola 10; Asts: Pangos 5 PIR: Heurtel 18	Boxscore	Pts: Radović, Seibutis 12; Rebs: Radović 9 Asts: Alocén 4 PIR: Radović 16	Arena: Palau Blaugrana; Attendance: 5,891; Referees: Carlos Peruga, Jordi Aliaga, Raúl Zamorano

11 June 2019	Tecnyconta Zaragoza	81–**96** (Series: **0–3**)	**Barça Lassa**	Zaragoza
21:00	Scoring by quarter: 19–**23**, 18–**27**, **21**–19, 23–**27**
	Pts: Justiz 24; Rebs: Justiz 9 Asts: three players 3 PIR: Justiz 32	Boxscore	Pts: Kuric 27; Rebs: Tomić 11; Asts: Heurtel 5 PIR: Kuric 27	Arena: Pabellón Príncipe Felipe; Attendance: 9,411; Referees: Daniel Hierrezuelo, Fernando Calatrava, Luis Miguel Castillo

Regular season series
Barça won 2–0 in the regular season series

13 October 2018

Boxscore

**Barça Lassa**	**99**–55	Tecnyconta Zaragoza

Palau Blaugrana, Barcelona

13 April 2019

Boxscore

Tecnyconta Zaragoza	86–**91**	**Barça Lassa**

Pabellón Príncipe Felipe, Zaragoza

This was the first meeting in the playoffs between Barça Lassa and Tecnyconta Zaragoza.

== Finals ==
All times are in Central European Summer Time (UTC+02:00)

15 June 2019	**Real Madrid**	**87**–67 (Series: **1–0**)	Barça Lassa	Madrid
21:00	Scoring by quarter: **22**–17, **25**–15, 16–**20**, **24**–15
	Pts: Campazzo 19; Rebs: Ayón 7 Asts: Campazzo, Llull 4 PIR: Campazzo 24	Boxscore	Pts: Heurtel 14; Rebs: Claver 12; Asts: Heurtel, Pangos 3 PIR: Claver 17	Arena: WiZink Center; Attendance: 11,876; Referees: Carlos Peruga, Fernando Calatrava, Luis Miguel Castillo

17 June 2019	**Real Madrid**	**81**–80 (Series: **2–0**)	Barça Lassa	Madrid
21:00	Scoring by quarter: 11–**17**, **18**–17, 24–**25**, **28**–21
	Pts: Carroll 25; Rebs: Tavares 9 Asts: Llull 5 PIR: Carroll 28	Boxscore	Pts: Heurtel 30; Rebs: Tomić 7 Asts: three players 2 PIR: Heurtel 28	Arena: WiZink Center; Attendance: 12,247; Referees: José Antonio Martín Bertrán, Antonio Conde, Rafael Serrano

19 June 2019	**Barça Lassa**	**78**–77 (Series: **1–2**)	Real Madrid	Barcelona
21:00	Scoring by quarter: **19**–18, 15–**22**, **22**–18, **22**–19
	Pts: Heurtel 21; Rebs: Claver 7 Asts: Hanga. Heurtel 4 PIR: Heurtel 19	Boxscore	Pts: Campazzo, Thompkins 18; Rebs: Randolph, Tavares 3 Asts: Campazzo 4 PIR: Campazzo 26	Arena: Palau Blaugrana; Attendance: 7,238; Referees: Daniel Hierrezuelo, Carlos Cortés, Vicente Bultó

21 June 2019	Barça Lassa	68–**74** (Series: **1–3**)	**Real Madrid**	Barcelona
21:00	Scoring by quarter: 21–**24**, 12–**13**, 14–**18**, **21**–19
	Pts: Pangos 16; Rebs: Tomić 6 Asts: Pangos 4 PIR: Singleton 13	Boxscore	Pts: Campazzo 15; Rebs: Tavares 13; Asts: Campazzo 6 PIR: Campazzo 28	Arena: Palau Blaugrana; Attendance: 7,301; Referees: Antonio Conde, Carlos Peruga, Fernando Calatrava

Regular season series
Barça won 2–0 in the regular season series

25 November 2018

Boxscore

**Barça Lassa**	**86**–69	Real Madrid

Palau Blaugrana, Barcelona

24 March 2019

Boxscore

Real Madrid	76–**82**	**Barça Lassa**

WiZink Center, Madrid

This was the 19th playoff meeting between these two teams, with each team winning nine series.

Previous playoff series
Tied 9–9 in all-time playoff series

1984

**Real Madrid**	**2**–1	FC Barcelona

1984 Finals

1986

**Real Madrid**	**2**–0	FC Barcelona

1986 Finals

1987

**FC Barcelona**	**3**–1	Real Madrid

1987 Semifinals

1988

**FC Barcelona**	**3**–2	Real Madrid

1988 Finals

1989

**FC Barcelona**	**3**–2	Real Madrid

1989 Finals

1992

**Real Madrid Asegurator**	**2**–0	FC Barcelona

1992 Quarterfinals

1994

**Real Madrid Teka**	**3**–0	FC Barcelona Banca Catalana

1994 Finals

1995

**FC Barcelona Banca Catalana**	**3**–2	Real Madrid Teka

1995 Semifinals

1997

Real Madrid Teka	2–**3**	**FC Barcelona Banca Catalana**

1997 Finals

2000

FC Barcelona	2–**3**	**Real Madrid Teka**

2000 Finals

2001

**FC Barcelona**	**3**–0	Real Madrid

2001 Finals

2006

**Winterthur FC Barcelona**	**3**–1	Real Madrid

2006 Quarterfinals

2007

**Real Madrid**	**3**–1	Winterthur FC Barcelona

2007 Finals

2012

**FC Barcelona Regal**	**3**–2	Real Madrid

2012 Finals

2013

**Real Madrid**	**3**–2	FC Barcelona Regal

2013 Finals

2014

Real Madrid	1–**3**	**FC Barcelona**

2014 Finals

2015

**Real Madrid**	**3**–0	FC Barcelona

2015 Finals

2016

FC Barcelona Lassa	1–**3**	**Real Madrid**

2016 Finals
