= State Fair Community College =

Community college in Sedalia, Missouri, U.S.

- Type: Public community college
- Established: 1966; 60 years ago
- President: Brent Bates
- Faculty: 347
- Administrative staff: 142
- Students: 4,284
- Location: Sedalia, Missouri, United States; 38.69698°N 93.26831°W
- Mascot: Roadrunner
- Website: www.sfccmo.edu

State Fair Community College is a public community college in Sedalia, Missouri, adjacent to the Missouri State Fairgrounds. In addition to the Sedalia campus, there are extended campus locations in Boonville, Lake of the Ozarks, Clinton, Warsaw, and Whiteman AFB. The college enrolled 4,284 students in 2019.

== History ==
State Fair Community College is part of the Junior College District of Sedalia, which was established on April 5, 1966, to serve 14 counties in west central Missouri. However, due to a lawsuit regarding the legality of community college districts in Missouri, that was not resolved until 1967 by the Missouri Supreme Court, the college's opening was delayed until Sept. 16, 1968. The college's name was selected by President Fred Davis and the Board of Trustees from names submitted by local residents to the board, with the winner being a submission from a local area high school student.

The campus opened with one building – a 35,000-square-foot facility with six modular units connected by a central hallway.

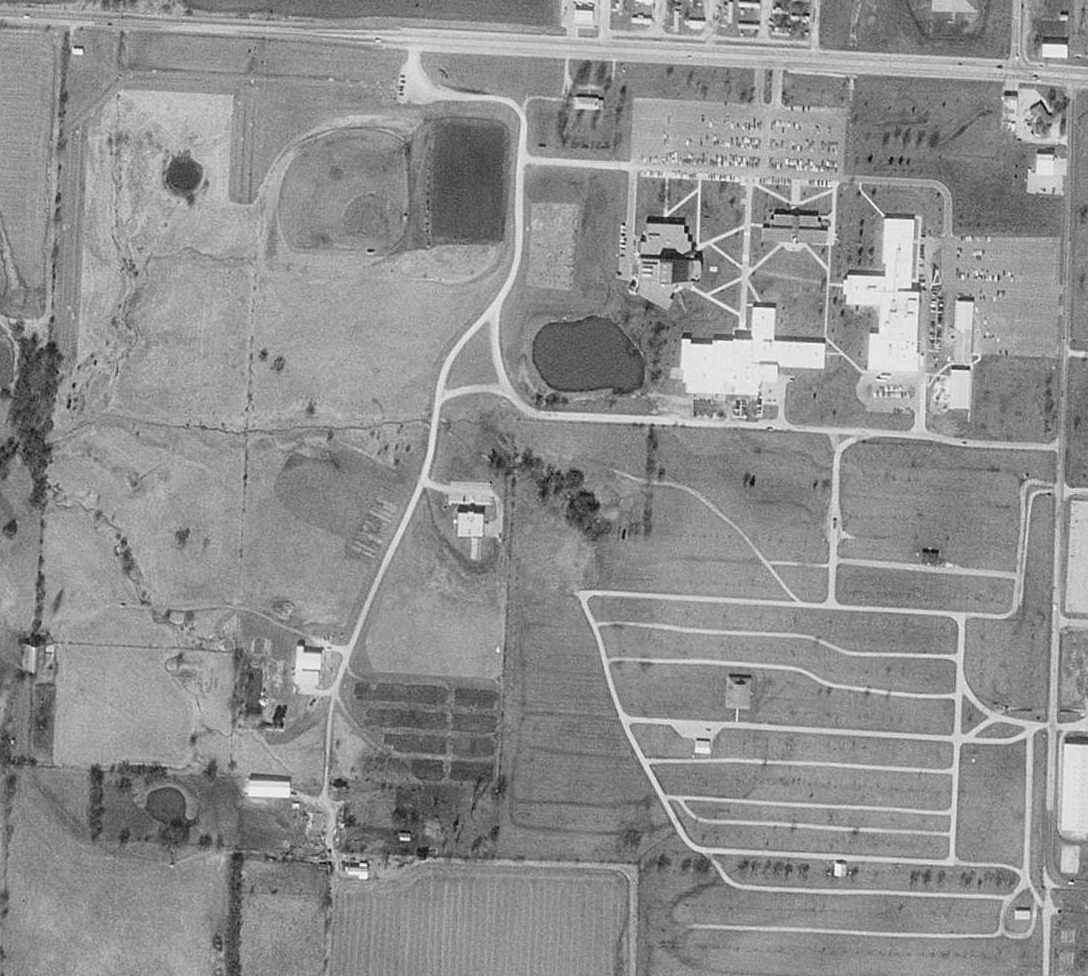
Aerial photo of the campus in 1997

Presidents of the college have been Fred Davis (1925-2013; 1967–1984), Marvin Fielding (1984-1997), Stephen Poort (1997-2003), Marsha Drennon (2003-2013), and Joanna Anderson (2013–2022).

Over the years SFCC has added new programs such as Engineering, Sustainable Agriculture, Renewable Energy in Biomass, Wind, and Solar energy, online courses, and dual-credit courses at 28 high school locations. Additionally, SFCC has residence halls at the Sedalia campus dormitories to better serve students.

The college is accredited by the Higher Learning Commission. Today, the college offers more than 30 academic programs.

== The Daum ==
The college's campus is home to The Daum Museum of Contemporary Art, which was constructed in 2002 to house the collection of local investor Harold F. Daum. The museum is noted as being part of an early 2000s U.S. Heartland mini-boom of local art museums. Construction cost approximately 2.6 million dollars and has 12,000 square feet (1,115 m^{2}) of exhibition space designed by Brian Smith.

== Notable alumni ==
- Joe Thomasson (born 1993), basketball player in the Israel Basketball Premier League
