= Joe Thomasson =

American basketball player (born 1993)

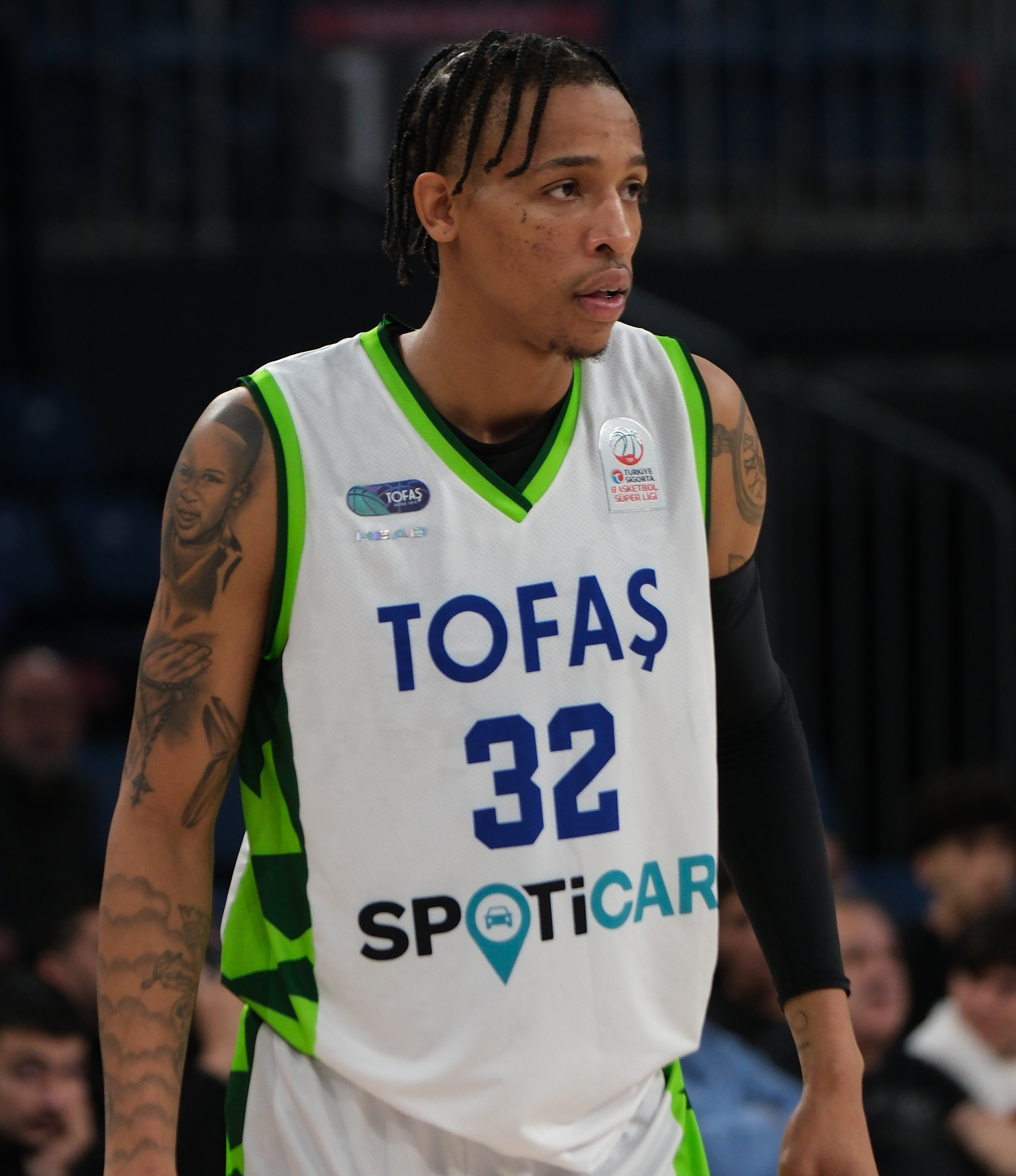
- Joe Thomasson playing for Tofaş

No. 24 – Soles de Mexicali
- Position: Shooting guard / point guard
- League: LNBP

Personal information
- Born: August 16, 1993 (age 33) Dayton, Ohio, U.S.
- Listed height: 6 ft 4 in (1.93 m)
- Listed weight: 165 lb (75 kg)

Career information
- High school: Thurgood Marshall (Dayton, Ohio)
- College: State Fair CC (2012–2014); Wright State (2014–2016)
- NBA draft: 2016: undrafted
- Playing career: 2016–present

Career history
- 2016: Dinamo București
- 2017: Erie BayHawks
- 2017–2018: Polpharma Starogard Gdański
- 2018: Burevestnik Yaroslavl
- 2018–2019: Start Lublin
- 2019–2020: Stelmet Zielona Góra
- 2020–2021: Hapoel Gilboa Galil
- 2021–2022: Manresa
- 2022: Zenit Saint Petersburg
- 2023: Promitheas Patras
- 2023–2024: Granada
- 2024: Maccabi Tel Aviv
- 2024–2025: Gran Canaria
- 2025: Tofaş
- 2026: Panionios
- 2026–present: Soles de Mexicali

Career highlights
- All-FIBA Champions League Second Team (2022); All-Spanish League Second Team (2022); Israeli League champion (2024); VTB United League Supercup winner (2022); Polish League champion (2020); Horizon League All-Defensive Team (2016)

Joe Thomasson (born August 16, 1993) is an American-born naturalized Georgian professional basketball player for Soles de Mexicali of the Liga Nacional de Baloncesto Profesional (LNBP). He played college basketball for State Fair Community College and Wright State.

== Early and personal life ==
Thomasson was born in Dayton, Ohio. His parents are Joseph E Thomasson Sr and Autumn Daye Bryant. He is 6 ft 4 in (193 cm) tall, and weighs 165 pounds (75 kg).

Thomasson attended and played basketball at Thurgood Marshall High School. In his senior year, he was the team captain and averaged 16 points per game, and was named All-Region.

== College career ==
Thomasson attended State Fair Community College between 2012 and 2014. He averaged 14.2 points per game as a freshman, and was named Region 16 First Team. As a sophomore, he averaged 18 points, six assists, and four rebounds a game, and was named a Junior College All American.

After two years, Thomasson moved to Wright State University. In 2014–15, he was second in the Horizon League with a .576 two-point field goal shooting percentage, and ninth in blocks, with 25. In 2015–16, he was fifth in the league with a .819 free throw percentage, sixth in the league in defensive rebounds, with 167, and seventh in assists, with 117. He was named to the Horizon League All-Defensive Team as a senior.

== Professional career ==
Thomasson began his professional career with a four-game stint to start the 2016–17 season with Dinamo București in Romania. In March 2017, he joined the Erie BayHawks of the NBA D-League.

For the 2017–18 season, Thomasson joined Polpharma Starogard Gdański in Poland.

Thomasson began the 2018–19 season with a six-game stint with BK Burevestnik Yaroslav in Russia. He then joined Start Lublin in Poland in November 2018 for the rest of the season.

On August 5, 2019, Thomasson signed with Stelmet Zielona Góra in Poland.

In May 2020, Thomasson joined Hapoel Gilboa Galil of the Israel Basketball Premier League. He played for them between June 22 and July 26, and then re-joined the team for the 2020–21 season.

On July 7, 2021, Thomasson signed with Baxi Manresa of the Liga ACB.

On July 11, 2022, Thomasson signed with Russian powerhouse Zenit Saint Petersburg of the VTB United League. He deleted his Twitter account after other Twitter users criticized him for signing with a Russian team, in the wake of its invasion of Ukraine. He left the team in late December 2022.

In January 2023, Thomasson joined Greek club Promitheas Patras for the rest of the season. In 14 domestic league matches, he averaged 12.6 points, 3.6 rebounds, 3.9 assists and 1.3 steals, playing around 27 minutes per contest. In May 2023, he joined Spanish club CB Granada for the rest of the season.

Thomasson re-joined Granada for the 2023–24 season but left the team in February 2024 to play out the season with Maccabi Tel Aviv in Israel.

On August 9, 2024, he signed with Gran Canaria of the Spanish Liga ACB.

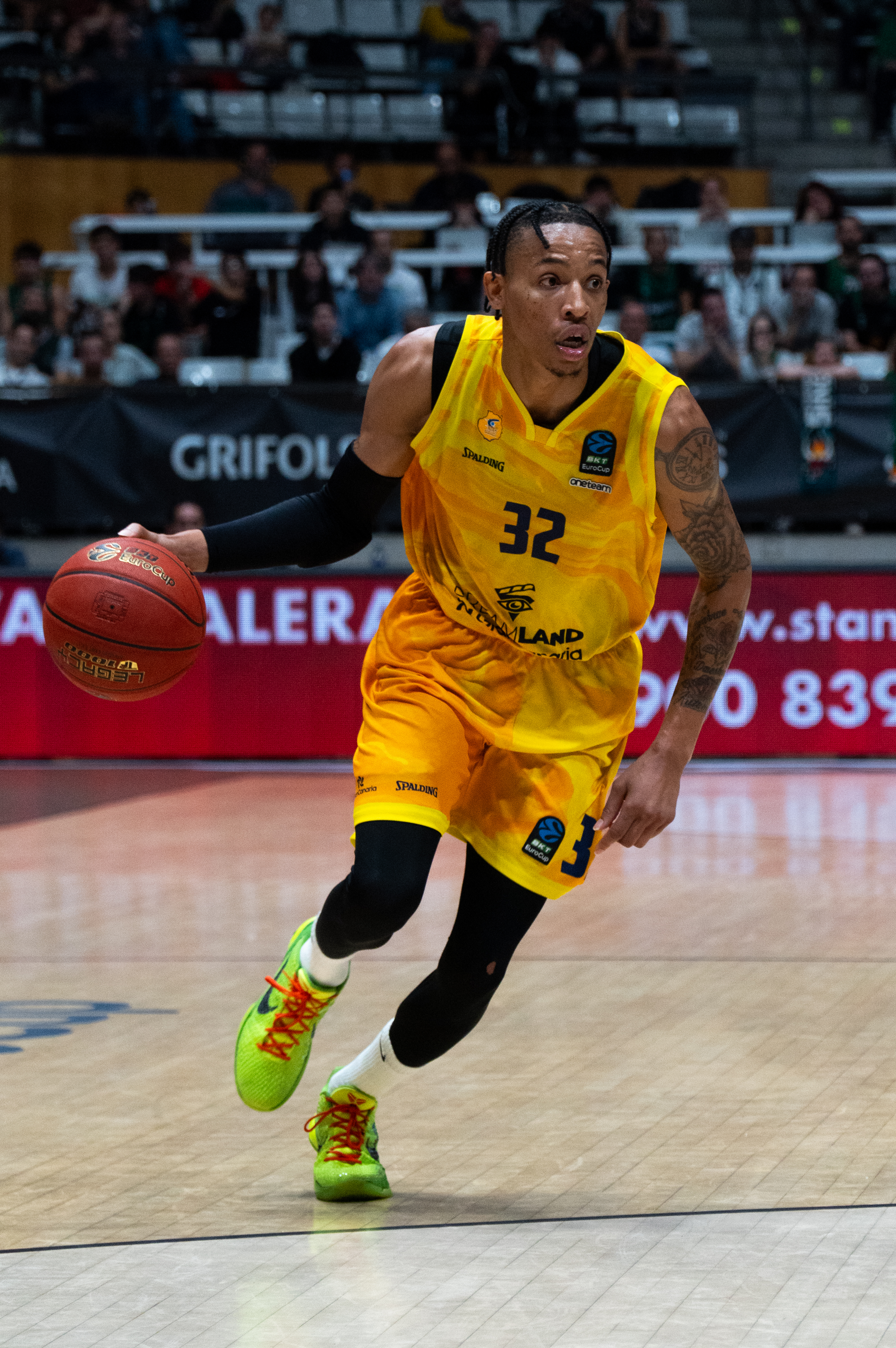
Joe Thomasson playing for Gran Canaria

On July 26, 2025, he signed with Tofaş of the Basketbol Süper Ligi (BSL).

On December 31, 2025, he signed with Panionios of the Greek Basketball League.

== National team career ==
Thomasson is a member of the senior Georgian national team. He played with Georgia at the 2024 FIBA Olympic Qualifying Tournament in Latvia and at the 2025 FIBA EuroBasket Qualifiers.

== Career statistics ==
Legend
GP	Games played	GS	Games started	MPG	Minutes per game
FG%	Field-goal percentage	3P%	3-point field-goal percentage	FT%	Free-throw percentage
RPG	Rebounds per game	APG	Assists per game	SPG	Steals per game
BPG	Blocks per game	PPG	Points per game	PIR	Performance index rating
**Bold**	Career high

=== EuroLeague ===
Year	Team	GP	GS	MPG	FG%	3P%	FT%	RPG	APG	SPG	BPG	PPG	PIR
2023–24	Maccabi Tel Aviv	4	0	6.8	.100	.000	1.000	1.5	1.3	.8	.5	1.0	1.8
Career		4	0	6.8	.100	.000	1.000	1.5	1.3	.8	.5	1.0	1.8

=== EuroCup ===
Year	Team	GP	GS	MPG	FG%	3P%	FT%	RPG	APG	SPG	BPG	PPG	PIR
2022–23	Promitheas Patras	10	1	27.2	.472	.409	.875	2.7	2.6	1.5	.3	14.1	13.1
Career		10	1	27.2	.472	.409	.875	2.7	2.6	1.5	.3	14.1	13.1

=== Basketball Champions League ===
Year	Team	GP	GS	MPG	FG%	3P%	FT%	RPG	APG	SPG	BPG	PPG
2021–22	Manresa	15	14	27.0	.461	.413	.903	3.2	3.7	1.1	.2	12.9
Career		15	14	27.0	.461	.413	.903	3.2	3.7	1.1	.2	12.9

=== Domestic leagues ===
Year	Team	League	GP	MPG	FG%	3P%	FT%	RPG	APG	SPG	BPG	PPG
2016–17	(Romania) Dinamo București	LNBM	4	33.2	.395	.200	.933	3.2	5.7	1.2	.2	11.5
2016–17	(United States) Erie BayHawks	D-League	3	21.8	.571	.600	—	3.3	2.7	.7	.7	6.3
2017–18	(Poland) Starogard Gdański	PLK	25	30.7	.429	.300	.927	4.1	4.9	1.3	.1	13.3
2018–19	(Poland) Start Lublin	PLK	21	32.3	.498	.405	.814	3.7	5.2	1.7	.3	19.3
2019–20	(Poland) Zielona Góra	PLK	22	25.0	.553	.354	.744	2.6	4.3	1.3	.5	9.3
2019–20	(Poland) Zielona Góra	VTBUL	19	25.9	.509	.434	.857	2.6	3.4	.6	.3	12.3
2019–20	(Israel) Hapoel Gilboa Galil	Ligat HaAl	12	31.3	.475	.391	.907	2.7	3.2	.8	.6	15.7
2020–21	(Israel) Hapoel Gilboa Galil	Ligat HaAl	33	30.2	.454	.380	.821	3.1	4.5	.9	.4	13.4
2020–21	(Israel) Hapoel Gilboa Galil	BIBL	9	25.0	.440	.250	.667	3.2	3.4	.6	.1	9.7
2021–22	(Spain) Manresa	ACB	35	26.5	.447	.385	.917	2.7	3.5	.6	.2	13.2
2022–23	(Russia) Zenit	VTBUL	14	15.8	.438	.435	.833	1.6	2.0	.4	.1	5.1
2022–23	(Greece) Promitheas Patras	HEBA A1	14	26.8	.409	.293	.949	3.6	3.9	1.4	.1	12.6
2022–23	(Spain) Granada	ACB	4	30.1	.469	.474	.833	2.0	3.0	1.7	—	15.0
2023–24	(Spain) Granada	ACB	20	31.1	.472	.346	.870	3.4	3.4	1.0	.3	14.0
2023–24	(Israel) Maccabi Tel Aviv	Ligat HaAl	20	18.5	.452	.429	.933	1.7	2.5	.9	.2	6.4

=== College ===
Year	Team	GP	GS	MPG	FG%	3P%	FT%	RPG	APG	SPG	BPG	PPG
2014–15	Wright State	28	23	**31.1**	**.492**	.305	.779	**5.5**	3.2	**.9**	**.9**	**10.0**
2015–16	Wright State	**35**	**34**	29.8	.427	**.352**	**.819**	5.3	**3.3**	.8	.5	9.6
Career		63	57	30.4	.455	.333	.801	5.4	3.3	.8	.7	9.8
