= Catalan basketball derby =

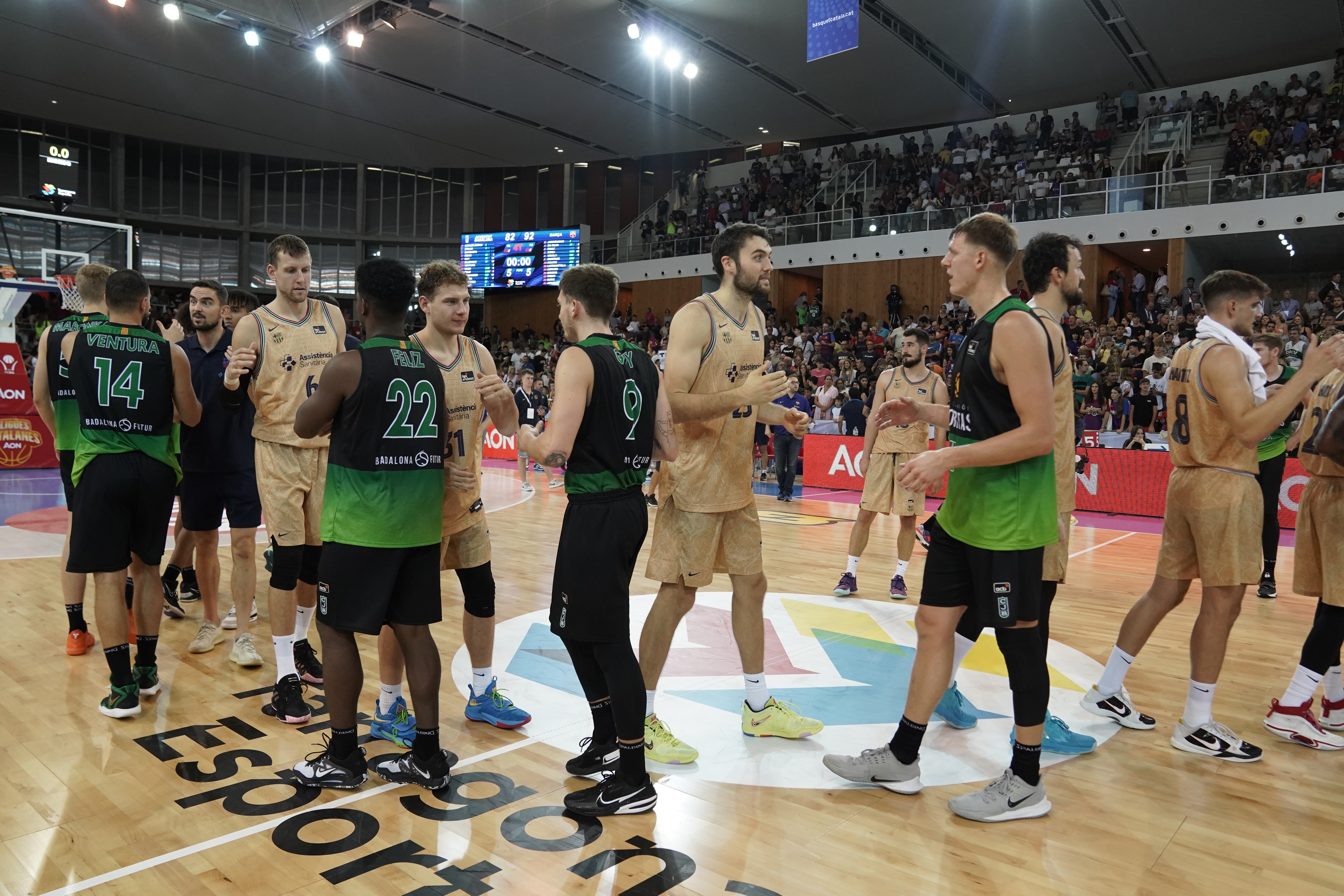
- Barcelona and Joventut players after the 2022 Catalan League final
- Location: Catalonia
- Teams: Barcelona; Joventut
- Stadiums: Palau Olímpic (Badalona); Palau Blaugrana (Barcelona)

The Catalan basketball derby (Catalan: Derbi català) is the name given to the basketball matches between Barcelona and Joventut, two major basketball clubs based in Catalonia. The arenas of both teams, Palau Blaugrana in Barcelona and Palau Olímpic in Badalona are separated by roughly 10 km.

== Head-to-head statistics ==
Competition	GP	FCB	D	CJB
Liga Nacional	52	22	0	30
Liga ACB	90	62	0	28
ACB Playoffs	50	33	0	17
Copa del Rey	33	15	0	18
Supercopa	2	2	0	1
EuroLeague	3	2	0	1
Total in official games	230	136	0	95
Catalan league	31	19	0	12
Total in all games	261	155	0	107

Updated as of 18 October 2026

== Players who played for both clubs ==
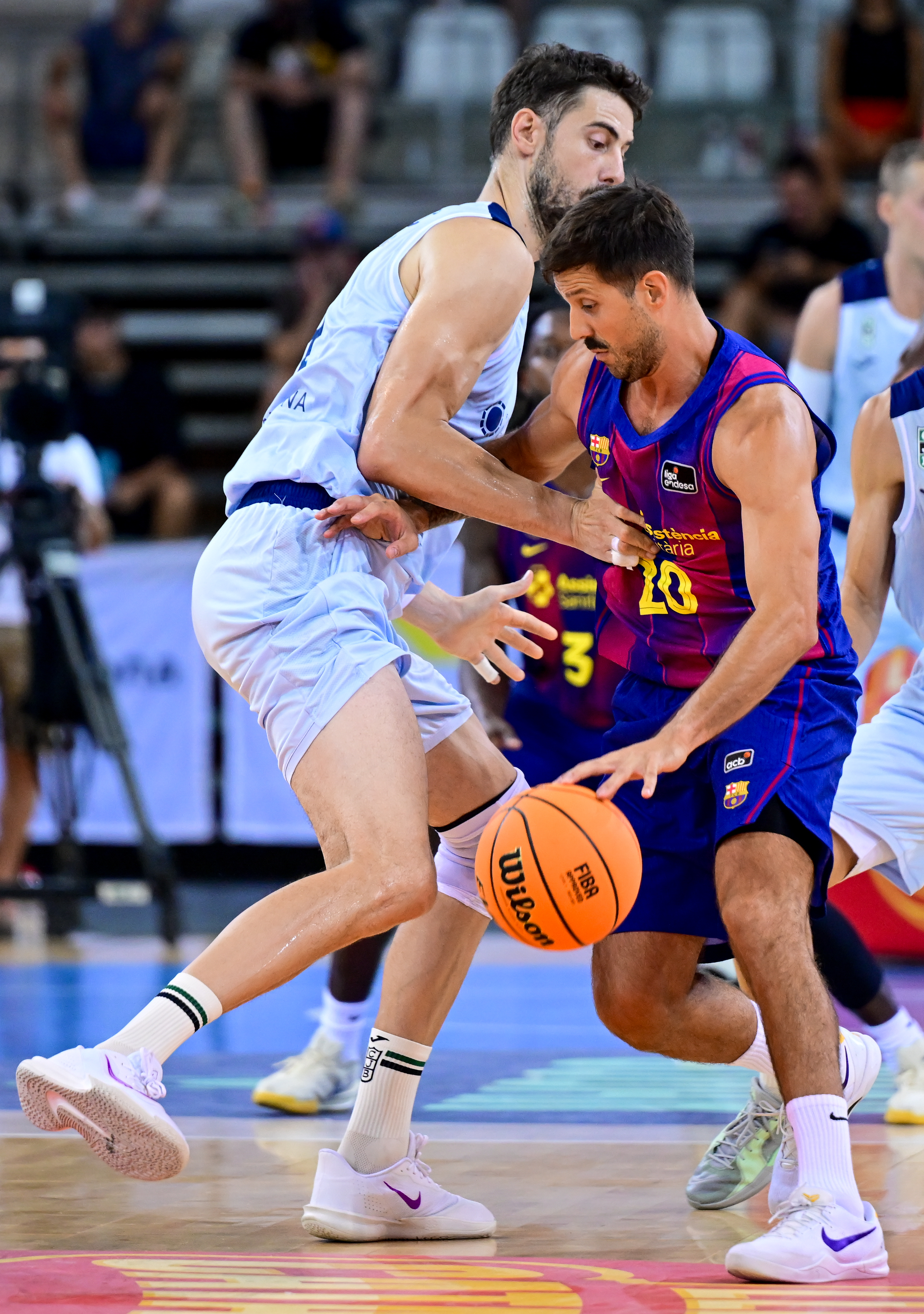
Ante Tomić and Nicolás Laprovíttola have both played for both teams

Barcelona then Joventut

- 1990: (Spain) Ferran Martínez
- 1996: (Spain) Quim Costa (via CB Girona)
- 1999: (Spain) Rafael Jofresa (via CB Girona)
- 2003: (Spain) Alfons Alzamora
- 2003: (France) Alain Digbeu (via Real Madrid)
- 2006: (Spain) Roberto Dueñas (via CB Girona)
- 2010: (Spain) Jordi Trias
- 2012: (Czech Republic) Luboš Bartoň (via Fuenlabrada)
- 2018: (Montenegro) Marko Todorović (via Khimki)
- 2020: (Spain) Pau Ribas
- 2020: (Croatia) Ante Tomić
- 2024: (Hungary) Ádám Hanga (via Crvena zvezda)
- 2024: (Ukraine) Artem Pustovyi (via Obradoiro)
- 2025: (Spain) Ricky Rubio
- 2026: (United States) Jabari Parker (via Partizan)
- 2026: (Argentina) Nicolás Laprovíttola

Joventut then Barcelona

- 1986: (Spain) Andrés Jiménez
- 1990: (Spain) José Antonio Montero
- 1994: (Spain) Ferran Martínez
- 1996: (Spain) Rafael Jofresa
- 2003: (Spain) Roger Grimau (via CE Lleida)
- 2008: (Czech Republic) Luboš Bartoň
- 2009: (Spain) Ricky Rubio
- 2011: (Brazil) Marcelo Huertas (via Baskonia)
- 2012: (Montenegro) Marko Todorović
- 2015: (Spain) Pau Ribas (via Valencia)
- 2021: (Argentina) Nicolás Laprovíttola (via Real Madrid)
- 2023: (Spain) Joel Parra

== See also ==
- Lliga Catalana de Bàsquet
