= 2006 ACB Playoffs =

Spanish basketball league play-offs

Quarter Finals
1	Unicaja Malaga	3
8	Adecco Estudiantes	0
4	DKV Joventut	3
5	Gran Canaria	0
2	TAU Ceramica	3
7	Akasvayu Girona	1
3	Winterthur FCB	3
6	Real Madrid	1

SemiFinals
1	Unicaja Malaga	3
4	DKV Joventut	2
2	TAU Ceramica	3
3	Winterthur FCB	0

Finals
1	Unicaja Malaga	3
2	TAU Ceramica	0

== Playoff seedings, results, and schedules ==
=== Quarter-finals ===
(1) Unicaja Malaga (26-7) vs. (8) Adecco Estudiantes (17-17)
Unicaja Malaga win the series 3-0

- Game 1 May 18 @ Malaga: Unicaja Malaga 84, Adecco Estudiantes 78
- Game 2 May 21 @ Madrid: Adecco Estudiantes 73, Unicaja Malaga 88
- Game 3 May 25 @ Malaga: Unicaja Malaga 80, Adecco Estudiantes 75

(2) TAU Cerámica (25-9) vs. (7) Akasvary Girona (18-16)
TAU Ceramica win the series 3-1

- Game 1 May 18 @ Vitoria-Gasteiz: TAU Cerámica 80, Akasvayu Girona 68
- Game 2 May 21 @ Girona: Akasvayu Girona 83, TAU Cerámica 74
- Game 3 May 25 @ Vitoria-Gasteiz: TAU Cerámica 93, Akasvayu Girona 84
- Game 4 May 28 @ Girona: Akasvayu Girona 67, TAU Cerámica 73

(3) Winterthur FCB (24-10) vs. (6) Real Madrid Baloncesto (19-15)
Winterthur FCB win the series 3-1

- Game 1 May 19 @ Barcelona: Winterthur FCB 79 Real Madrid-Teka 67
- Game 2 May 21 @ Madrid: Real Madrid-Teka 70, Winterthur FCB 88
- Game 3 May 26 @ Barcelona: Winterthur FCB 74, Real Madrid-Teka 84
- Game 4 May 28 @ Madrid: Real Madrid-Teka 68, Winterthur FCB 83

(4) DKV Joventut (23-11) vs. (5) Gran Canaria Grupo Dunas (20-14)
DKV Joventut win the series 3-0

- Game 1 May 18 @ Badalona: DKV Joventut 81, Gran Canaria Grupo Dunas 70
- Game 2 May 21 @ Las Palmas de Gran Canaria: Gran Canaria Grupo Dunas 69, DKV Joventut 72
- Game 3 May 25 @ Badalona: DKV Joventut 81, Gran Canaria Grupo Dunas 76

=== Semifinals ===
- These four teams classified for the semifinals will play the Euroleague for the 2006/2007 season.
- The other best two teams are classified for the ULEB Cup.

(1) Unicaja Malaga (26-7) vs. (4) DKV Joventut (23-11)
Unicaja Malaga win the series 3-2

- Game 1 June 2 @ Málaga: Unicaja Malaga 80, DKV Joventut 66
- Game 2 June 4 @ Málaga: Unicaja Malaga 76, DKV Joventut 61
- Game 3 June 9 @ Badalona: DKV Joventut 76, Unicaja Malaga 68
- Game 4 June 11 @ Badalona: DKV Joventut 84, Unicaja Malaga 75
- Game 5 June 13 @ Málaga: Unicaja Malaga 88, DKV Joventut 75

(2) TAU Cerámica (25-9) vs. (3) Winterthur FCB (24-10)
TAU Cerámica win the series 3-0

- Game 1 June 1 @ Vitoria-Gasteiz: TAU Cerámica 96, Winterthur FCB 83
- Game 2 June 4 @ Vitoria-Gasteiz: TAU Cerámica 71, Winterthur FCB 66
- Game 3 June 8 @ Barcelona: Winterthur FCB 78, TAU Cerámica 84

=== TV coverage ===
- La2
- Teledeporte
- FORTA

=== ACB Finals ===
(1) Unicaja Malaga (26-7) vs. (2) TAU Cerámica (25-9)
Unicaja Malaga win the series 3-0

- Game 1 June 16 @ Málaga: Unicaja Malaga 81, TAU Ceramica 67
- Game 2 June 18 @ Málaga: Unicaja Malaga 83, TAU Ceramica 78
- Game 3 June 21 @ Vitoria-Gasteiz: TAU Ceramica 72, Unicaja Malaga 76

UNICAJA MALAGA: 2005/2006 ACB CHAMPION

==== MVP ====
- (Spain) Jorge Garbajosa
