= Pavelló Nou Congost =

Indoor arena in Manresa, Spain

Coordinates: 41°43′31.2″N 1°48′33.62″E

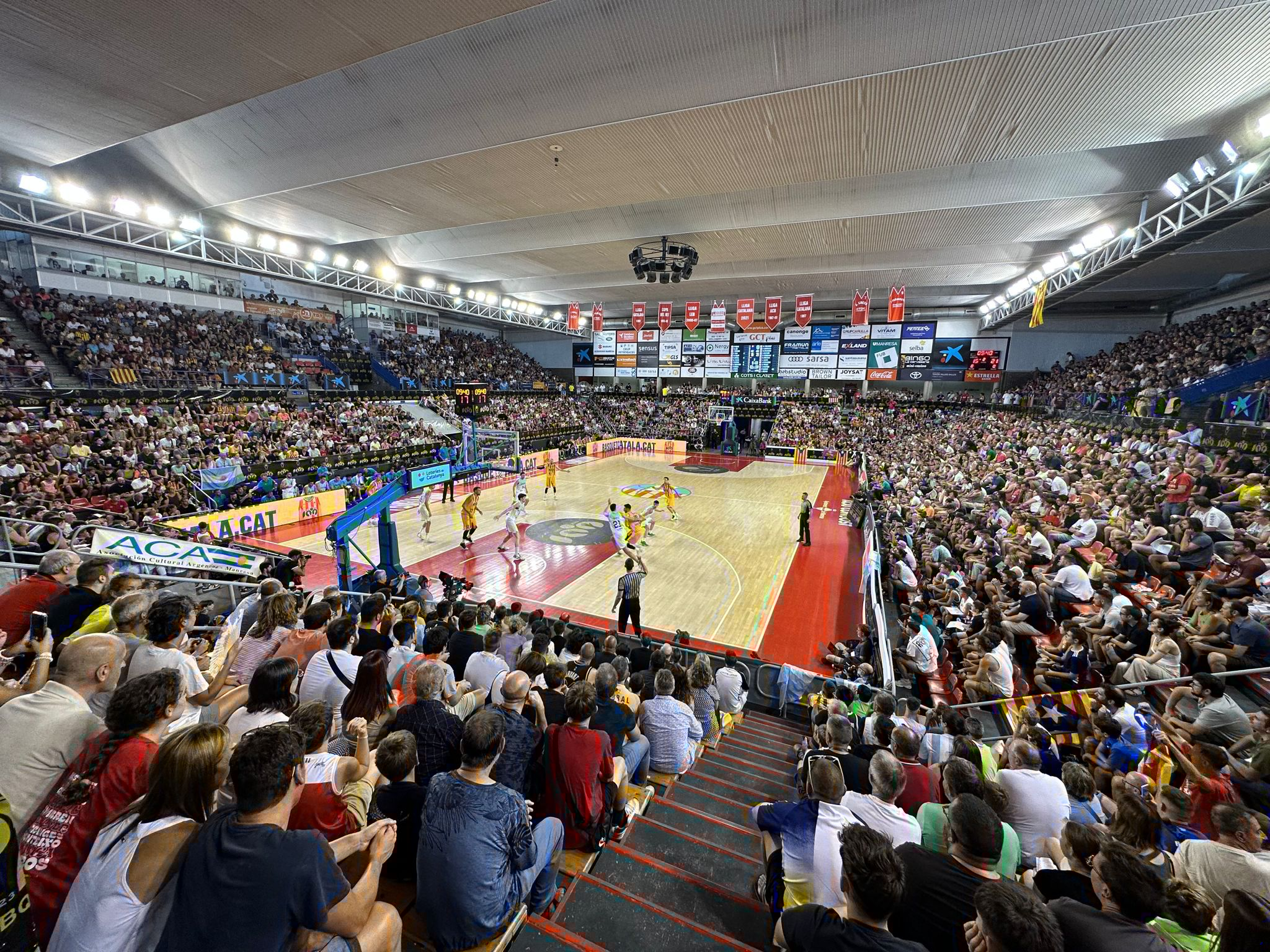
- Interactive map of Pavelló Nou Congost
- Full name: Pavelló Nou Congost
- Location: Manresa, Catalonia
- Owner: Manresa city council
- Capacity: 5,000
- Surface: Parquet Floor

Construction
- Groundbreaking: October 1990
- Opened: 11 September 1992
- Cost: 4,000,000 €

Tenant
- Bàsquet Manresa (1992–present)

Pavelló Nou Congost is an indoor arena in Manresa, Catalonia, with a capacity of 5,000 people. It is primarily used for basketball and has been the home arena of Bàsquet Manresa since 1992.

== History ==
The arena was inaugurated in September 1992, when it hosted the Lliga Catalana de Bàsquet. Since then, the Nou Congost has hosted the tournament three more times (1996, 2011 and 2021).

The arena's construction started in October 1990, with the purpose of replacing Manresa's original arena, the Congost, which had been built in 1968 and had a capacity of only 2,500. The works had a cost of 670 million pesetas (around 4 million Euro). The new arena was built next to the former, only 100 meters apart. The 'old' Congost, which was renovated in 2010, is currently used as a training facility.

In November 2025, Bàsquet Manresa and the Manresa city council announced an agreement to pursue a renovation and expansion project of the Nou Congost. The project would increase the arena's capacity to 6,500.

== Attendances ==
This is a list of league attendances of Bàsquet Manresa playing in the Liga ACB since the 2012–13 season.

Season	Total	High	Low	Average
2012–13 ACB	72,700	5,000	3,550	4,276
2013–14 ACB	64,361	4,900	2,100	4,023
2014–15 ACB	72,300	4,700	3,700	4,253
2015–16 ACB	73,610	4,825	3,870	4,330
2016–17 ACB	63,760	4,420	3,530	3,985
2018–19 ACB	84,695	5,000	4,450	4,705
2019–20 ACB	54,180	5,000	3,740	4,515
2021–22 ACB	67,572	5,000	1,400	3,754
2022–23 ACB	79,764	5,000	4,062	4,692
2023–24 ACB	87,449	5,000	4,460	4,858
2024–25 ACB	82,878	5,000	4,633	4,875
