= 2018–19 FC Barcelona Bàsquet season =

Spanish basketball club season

FC Barcelona Lassa
2018–19 season
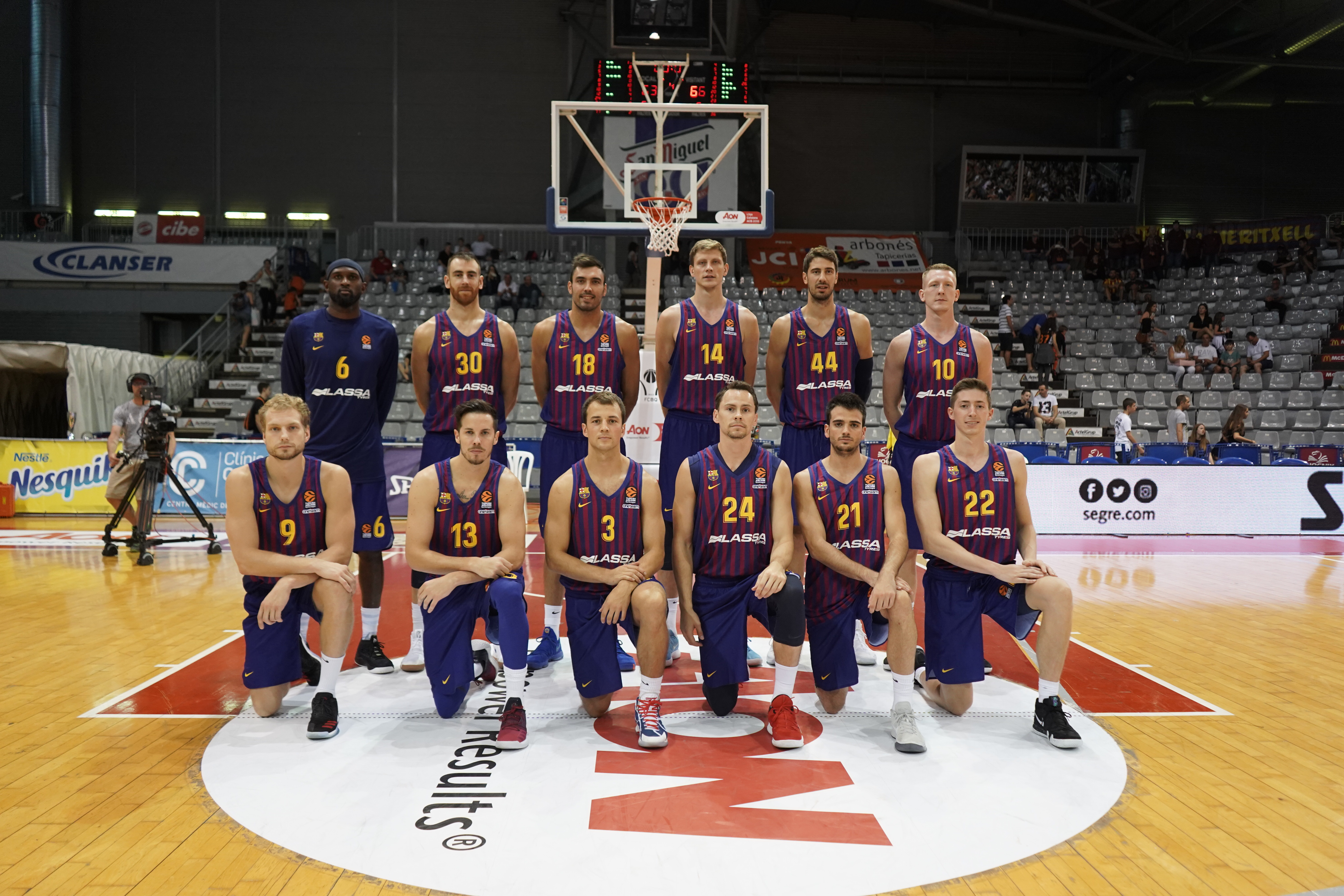
- Barcelona roster in September 2018
- President: Josep Maria Bartomeu
- Head coach: Svetislav Pešić
- Arena: Palau Blaugrana
- Liga ACB: 2nd
- Playoffs: Runners-up
- EuroLeague: Playoff series
- Copa del Rey: Winners
- Supercopa: Semifinals
- Highest home attendance: 7,311 vs Real Madrid (1 March 2019)
- Average home attendance: 5,793 (in EuroLeague); 5,323 (in Liga ACB)
- Biggest win: 101–59 vs Tecnyconta Zaragoza (7 June 2019)
- Biggest defeat: 68–102 vs Anadolu Efes (24 April 2019)
Home	Away
- All statistics correct as of 22 September 2025.

The 2018–19 season was FC Barcelona's 93rd in existence, their 36th consecutive season in the top flight of Spanish basketball and 19th consecutive season in the EuroLeague.

In the 2018–19 season, FC Barcelona competed in the Liga ACB, the Supercopa, the Copa del Rey and the EuroLeague.

== Players ==
=== Roster ===
Note: Flags indicate national team eligibility at FIBA-sanctioned events. Players may hold other non-FIBA nationalities not displayed.

FC Barcelona Lassa roster
Players
Coaches

Pos.	No.	Nat.	Name	Ht.	Wt.	Age
PF/C	1	(France)	Séraphin, Kevin	2.08 m (6 ft 10 in)	126 kg (278 lb)	29 – 7 December 1989
PG	3	(Slovenia)	Pangos, Kevin	1.85 m (6 ft 1 in)	81 kg (179 lb)	26 – 26 January 1993
SG	5	(Spain)	Ribas, Pau	1.96 m (6 ft 5 in)	95 kg (209 lb)	32 – 2 March 1987
PF/C	6	(United States)	Singleton, Chris	2.06 m (6 ft 9 in)	108 kg (238 lb)	29 – 21 November 1989
SF	8	(Hungary)	Hanga, Ádám	2.00 m (6 ft 7 in)	95 kg (209 lb)	30 – 12 April 1989
G/F	9	(Slovenia)	Blažič, Jaka	1.96 m (6 ft 5 in)	96 kg (212 lb)	28 – 30 June 1990
PF/C	10	(Latvia)	Šmits, Rolands	2.08 m (6 ft 10 in)	107 kg (236 lb)	23 – 25 June 1995
PG	13	(France)	Heurtel, Thomas	1.89 m (6 ft 2 in)	82 kg (181 lb)	30 – 10 April 1989
C	14	(Ukraine)	Pustovyi, Artem	2.19 m (7 ft 2 in)	98 kg (216 lb)	26 – 25 June 1992
PF/C	18	(Spain)	Oriola, Pierre	2.08 m (6 ft 10 in)	107 kg (236 lb)	26 – 25 September 1992
SG	24	(Slovakia)	Kuric, Kyle	1.93 m (6 ft 4 in)	88 kg (194 lb)	29 – 25 August 1989
F	30	(Spain)	Claver, Víctor	2.06 m (6 ft 9 in)	102 kg (225 lb)	30 – 30 August 1988
C	44	(Croatia)	Tomić, Ante (C)	2.18 m (7 ft 2 in)	120 kg (265 lb)	32 – 17 February 1987

Head coach

- (Serbia) Svetislav Pešić

Assistant coach(es)

- (Spain) Ricard Casas
- (Spain) David García
- (Spain) Óscar Orellana

Legend

- (C) Team captain
- Injured

- Roster
Updated: 18-9-2025

=== Depth chart ===
Pos.	Starting 5	Bench 1	Bench 2
C	Ante Tomić	Artem Pustovyi	Kevin Séraphin
PF	Pierre Oriola †	Chris Singleton *	Rolands Šmits †
SF	Ádám Hanga	Víctor Claver †
SG	Pau Ribas †	Kyle Kuric	Jaka Blažič
PG	Thomas Heurtel	Kevin Pangos

Notes: Blue † – homegrown player; (Note: A homegrown player is a player that played for at least three years before the age of 20 on a Spanish team. In Liga ACB, the team must register at least four homegrown players in rosters of 10–12 players or at least three homegrown players in rosters of 8–9 players. In EuroLeague, the team did not have any limitations regarding the number of homegrown players.) Red * – overseas player; (Note: An overseas player is a player from outside EEA, FIBA Europe or ACP states. In Liga ACB, the team may register at most two overseas players. In EuroLeague, the team did not have any limitations regarding the number of overseas players.) Green ‡ – youth player (Note: In Liga ACB, the team may register under-22 players linked to the youth system. In EuroLeague, the team may register under-20 players linked to the youth system.)

=== Roster changes ===
==== In ====
No.	Pos.	Nat.	Name	Moving from		Type	Date	Source
10	PF/C	(Latvia)	Rolands Šmits	Baloncesto Fuenlabrada	(Spain)	End of loan	30 Jun 2018	
6	PF/C	(United States)	Chris Singleton	Panathinaikos	(Greece)	End of contract	17 Jul 2018	
24	SG	(Slovakia)	Kyle Kuric	Zenit Saint Petersburg	(Russia)	Contract buyout	18 Jul 2018	
3	PG	(Slovenia)	Kevin Pangos	Žalgiris Kaunas	(Lithuania)	End of contract	25 Jul 2018	
14	C	(Ukraine)	Artem Pustovyi	Monbus Obradoiro	(Spain)	Parted ways	30 Jul 2018	
9	G/F	(Slovenia)	Jaka Blažič	MoraBanc Andorra	(Spain)	Waived	9 Aug 2018	

==== Out ====
No.	Pos.	Nat.	Name	Moving to		Type	Date	Source
14	PF	(Bulgaria)	Aleksandar Vezenkov	Olympiacos	(Greece)	Parted ways	29 Jun 2018	
21	C	(Senegal)	Moussa Diagne	MoraBanc Andorra	(Spain)	Parted ways	29 Jun 2018	
25	G	(Finland)	Petteri Koponen	FC Bayern Munich	(Germany)	Parted ways	29 Jun 2018	
2	C	(United States)	Jalen Reynolds	Zenit Saint Petersburg	(Russia)	End of contract	30 Jun 2018	
6	SG	(Spain)	Marc García	Fuenlabrada	(Spain)	End of contract	30 Jun 2018	
8	PG	(United States)	Phil Pressey	Beşiktaş	(Turkey)	End of contract	30 Jun 2018	
10	SG	(France)	Edwin Jackson	Budućnost VOLI	(Montenegro)	End of contract	30 Jun 2018	
21	G/F	(United States)	Rakim Sanders	Erie BayHawks	(United States)	End of contract	30 Jun 2018	
45	PF	(France)	Adrien Moerman	Anadolu Efes	(Turkey)	End of contract	30 Jun 2018	
11	SG	(Spain)	Juan Carlos Navarro			Retirement	17 Aug 2018	

== Pre-season and friendlies ==
=== Friendly matches ===
2 September 2018 Torneig BBVA	Divina Seguros Joventut	65–62	FC Barcelona Lassa	Sant Julià de Vilatorta
12:30
	Pts: Mathias 16	Report	Pts: Pangos, Šmits 10	Arena: Pavelló Esportiu Municipal

12 September 2018 Torneig Ciutat de Borges	FC Barcelona Lassa	101–64	Partizan Belgrade	Les Borges Blanques
20:30	Scoring by quarter: 23–16, 24–10, 25–16, 29–22
	Pts: Singleton 18; Rebs: Blažič 6 Asts: Heurtel 9 PIR: Claver 21	Boxscore	Pts: Zagorac 13; Rebs: Pecarski 5 Asts: Nikolić, Zagorac 3 PIR: Zagorac 14	Arena: Pavelló Francesc Macià; Attendance: 950; Referees: Martín Bertrán, Perea Lorente, Oyón Cauqui

15 September 2018	Arka Gdynia	67–94	FC Barcelona Lassa	Gdynia
18:00	Scoring by quarter: 15–13, 26–37, 13–30, 13–14
	Pts: Dylewicz 10; Rebs: Dylewicz 7 Asts: Szubarga 6 PIR: Szubarga, Wyka 10	Boxscore	Pts: Kuric 20; Rebs: Kuric, Tomić 6 Asts: Heurtel 5 PIR: Kuric 26	Arena: Gdynia Arena; Referees: Lamonica, Zamojski, Kowalski

=== Lliga Catalana de Bàsquet ===
8 September 2018 Semifinal	FC Barcelona Lassa (Catalonia)	78–63	(Catalonia) BAXI Manresa	Lleida
20:00	Scoring by quarter: 16–16, 19–17, 24–20, 19–10
	Pts: Tomić 15; Rebs: Oriola, Tomić 5 Asts: Heurtel 4 PIR: Tomić 22	Boxscore	Pts: Toolson 21; Rebs: three players 4 Asts: Toolson 4 PIR: Toolson 20	Arena: Pavelló Barris Nord; Attendance: 2,500; Referees: Martín Bertrán, Aliaga, Padrós

9 September 2018 Final	FC Barcelona Lassa (Catalonia)	76–94	(Andorran Basketball Federation) MoraBanc Andorra	Lleida
20:00	Scoring by quarter: 15–21, 18–25, 18–26, 25–22
	Pts: Heurtel, Tomić 12	Boxscore	Pts: Vitali 15	Arena: Pavelló Barris Nord; Attendance: 2,500

== Competitions ==
=== Overview ===
Competition	First match	Last match	Starting round	Final position	Record							
Competition	First match	Last match	Starting round	Final position	Pld	W	D	L	PF	PA	PD	Win %
Liga ACB	27 September 2018	21 June 2019	Round 1	Runners-up	43	33		10	3,708	3,266	+442	76.74
EuroLeague	11 October 2018	1 May 2019	Round 1	Playoffs	35	20		15	2,721	2,683	+38	57.14
Copa del Rey	14 February 2019	17 February 2019	Quarter-finals	Winners	3	3		0	272	246	+26	100.00
Supercopa	21 September 2018	21 September 2018	Semifinals	Semifinals	1	0		1	76	79	−3	0.00
Total					82	56	0	26	6,777	6,274	+503	68.29

Last updated: 22 September 2025
Source: Competitions

=== Liga ACB ===
==== League table ====
Pos	Team	Pld	W	L	PF	PA	PD	Qualification or relegation
1	Real Madrid	34	28	6	3026	2679	+347	Qualification to playoffs
2	Barça Lassa	34	27	7	2948	2590	+358	Qualification to playoffs
3	Kirolbet Baskonia	34	26	8	2927	2549	+378	Qualification to playoffs
4	Valencia Basket	34	23	11	2793	2673	+120	Qualification to playoffs
5	Unicaja	34	21	13	2843	2773	+70	Qualification to playoffs

Source: ACB

==== Results summary ====
Overall						Home					Away				
Pld	W	L	PF	PA	PD	W	L	PF	PA	PD	W	L	PF	PA	PD
34	27	7	2948	2590	+358	15	2	1525	1283	+242	12	5	1423	1307	+116

Source: Competitive matches

==== Results by round ====
Round	1	2	3	4	5	6	7	8	9	10	11	12	13	14	15	16	17	18	19	20	21	22	23	24	25	26	27	28	29	30	31	32	33	34
Ground	H	A	H	H	A	H	A	H	A	H	H	A	A	H	A	H	A	H	A	H	A	H	H	A	H	A	A	H	A	A	H	A	H	A
Result	W	W	W	W	W	W	L	W	W	W	W	L	W	W	W	W	W	W	L	W	L	W	W	W	W	W	W	L	L	W	L	W	W	W
Position	2	2	2	1	1	2	3	1	2	1	1	1	1	1	1	1	1	1	1	1	1	1	1	1	1	1	1	1	1	1	3	3	3	2

Source: Competitive matches
A = Away; H = Home; W = Win; L = Loss; R = Rest

==== Matches ====
27 September 2018 1	FC Barcelona Lassa	98–78	Herbalife Gran Canaria	Barcelona
21:30	Scoring by quarter: 29–17, 20–15, 22–31, 27–15
	Pts: Tomić 21; Rebs: Heurtel, Tomić 6 Asts: Heurtel 11; PIR: Tomić 29	Boxscore	Pts: Báez 16; Rebs: Balvín 6 Asts: Báez, Oliver 3 PIR: Báez 19	Arena: Palau Blaugrana; Attendance: 4,027; Referees: Carlos Peruga, Sergio Manuel, Martín Caballero

4 October 2018 2	BAXI Manresa	78–88	FC Barcelona Lassa	Manresa
20:45	Scoring by quarter: 11–21, 26–26, 22–13, 19–28
	Pts: Vene 15; Rebs: Luković 5 Asts: Renfroe 8 PIR: Toolson 16	Boxscore	Pts: Tomić 15; Rebs: Tomić 7 Asts: Heurtel 7 PIR: Tomić 17	Arena: Nou Congost; Attendance: 5,000; Referees: Carlos Cortés, Francisco Araña, Alberto Sánchez Sixto

7 October 2018 3	FC Barcelona Lassa	67–63	MoraBanc Andorra	Barcelona
17:00	Scoring by quarter: 13–17, 20–15, 22–18, 12–13
	Pts: Singleton 16; Rebs: Tomić 10; Asts: Heurtel 7 PIR: Singleton 16	Boxscore	Pts: Whittington 14; Rebs: Whittington 7 Asts: Diagne, Whittington 3 PIR: Whittington 20	Arena: Palau Blaugrana; Attendance: 4,543; Referees: Juan Carlos García González, Óscar Perea, Alfonso Olivares

13 October 2018 4	FC Barcelona Lassa	99–55	Tecnyconta Zaragoza	Barcelona
20:30	Scoring by quarter: 25–9, 27–12, 26–14, 21–20
	Pts: Ribas 20; Rebs: Oriola 8 Asts: Pangos 8 PIR: Ribas 19	Boxscore	Pts: McCalebb 16; Rebs: four players 3 Asts: three players 2 PIR: McCalebb 19	Arena: Palau Blaugrana; Attendance: 5,192; Referees: Daniel Hierrezuelo, Jordi Aliaga, Rubén Sánchez Mohedas

21 October 2018 5	Valencia Basket	85–86	FC Barcelona Lassa	Valencia
19:15	Scoring by quarter: 23–22, 12–21, 25–20, 25–23
	Pts: Thomas 27; Rebs: Thomas 9 Asts: van Rossom 6 PIR: Thomas 29	Boxscore	Pts: Singleton 20; Rebs: three players 6 Asts: Pangos 5 PIR: Pangos 25	Arena: La Fonteta; Attendance: 7,912; Referees: Miguel Ángel Pérez Pérez, José Ramón García Ortiz, Rafael Serrano

28 October 2018 6	FC Barcelona Lassa	94–92(OT)	Divina Seguros Joventut	Barcelona
12:30	Scoring by quarter: 14–25, 26–13, 21–19, 20–24, Overtime: 13–11
	Pts: Pangos 32; Rebs: Blažič, Singleton 6 Asts: Pangos 4 PIR: Pangos 33	Boxscore	Pts: Dawson 20; Rebs: Birgander 6 Asts: Laprovíttola 10; PIR: Dawson 24	Arena: Palau Blaugrana; Attendance: 6,045; Referees: Benjamín Jiménez, Fernando Calatrava, Esperanza Mendoza

3 November 2018 7	Montakit Fuenlabrada	79–73	FC Barcelona Lassa	Fuenlabrada
18:00	Scoring by quarter: 17–16, 18–18, 16–18, 28–21
	Pts: Rupnik 15; Rebs: Clark 9 Asts: Clark, O'Leary 3 PIR: Rupnik 16	Boxscore	Pts: Heurtel 16; Rebs: Oriola 10; Asts: Heurtel, Ribas 4 PIR: Oriola 26	Arena: Fernando Martín; Attendance: 4,912; Referees: Carlos Peruga, Vicente Bultó, Alberto Baena

11 November 2018 8	FC Barcelona Lassa	105–73	UCAM Murcia	Barcelona
19:30	Scoring by quarter: 25–17, 19–20, 24–24, 37–12
	Pts: Blažič 18; Rebs: Blažič 8 Asts: Heurtel 6 PIR: Blažič 31	Boxscore	Pts: Urtasun 15; Rebs: Cățe 8 Asts: Doyle 5 PIR: Urtasun 21	Arena: Palau Blaugrana; Attendance: 4,059; Referees: Antonio Conde, Jorge Martínez, Jacobo Rial

18 November 2018 9	Movistar Estudiantes	84–101	FC Barcelona Lassa	Madrid
17:00	Scoring by quarter: 19–26, 11–25, 25–21, 29–29
	Pts: Janković 21; Rebs: Janković 8 Asts: Cook 6 PIR: Janković 22	Boxscore	Pts: Tomić 18; Rebs: Hanga, Oriola 4 Asts: Heurtel 9 PIR: Heurtel, Tomić 21	Arena: WiZink Center; Attendance: 12,165; Referees: Carlos Cortés, Luis Miguel Castillo, Raúl Zamorano

25 November 2018 10	FC Barcelona Lassa	86–69	Real Madrid	Barcelona
19:30	Scoring by quarter: 20–19, 19–17, 24–23, 23–10
	Pts: Kuric 16; Rebs: Séraphin, Singleton 8 Asts: Pangos 4 PIR: Singleton 17	Boxscore	Pts: Carroll 12; Rebs: Tavares 7 Asts: Campazzo 7 PIR: Tavares 16	Arena: Palau Blaugrana; Attendance: 7,159; Referees: Daniel Hierrezuelo, Sergio Manuel, Alberto Sánchez Sixto

9 December 2018 11	FC Barcelona Lassa	77–73	Iberostar Tenerife	Barcelona
19:15	Scoring by quarter: 17–21, 19–20, 20–7, 21–25
	Pts: Singleton 12; Rebs: Singleton 12; Asts: Singleton, Tomić 3 PIR: Singleton 25	Boxscore	Pts: Abromaitis,Saiz 16; Rebs: Iverson 6 Asts: Beirán, McFadden 5 PIR: Saiz 16	Arena: Palau Blaugrana; Attendance: 4,269; Referees: Juan Carlos García González, José Ramón García Ortiz, Iyán González

16 December 2018 12	Unicaja	78–73	FC Barcelona Lassa	Málaga
19:30	Scoring by quarter: 16–16, 21–18, 25–19, 16–20
	Pts: Wiltjer 14; Rebs: Milosavljević 8 Asts: Fernández, Roberts 6 PIR: Lessort 14	Boxscore	Pts: Hanga, Kuric 12; Rebs: Singleton 6 Asts: Heurtel 14; PIR: Heurtel 20	Arena: Martín Carpena; Attendance: 9,750; Referees: Carlos Peruga, Jordi Aliaga, Javier Torres

22 December 2018 13	Delteco GBC	71–104	FC Barcelona Lassa	San Sebastián
18:00	Scoring by quarter: 21–28, 26–20, 7–34, 17–22
	Pts: Nevels 17; Rebs: Nevels 7 Asts: Nevels, Pérez 4 PIR: Nevels 20	Boxscore	Pts: Hanga 16; Rebs: Séraphin 8 Asts: Heurtel 5 PIR: Hanga 21	Arena: Donostia Arena; Attendance: 3,987; Referees: José Antonio Martín Bertrán, Francisco Araña, Esperanza Mendoza

29 December 2018 14	FC Barcelona Lassa	79–73	Monbus Obradoiro	Barcelona
18:00	Scoring by quarter: 19–20, 18–12, 15–17, 27–24
	Pts: Séraphin 18; Rebs: Seraphin 11; Asts: four players 2 PIR: Séraphin 30	Boxscore	Pts: Obst 20; Rebs: three players 5 Asts: Sàbat 7 PIR: Obst 26	Arena: Palau Blaugrana; Attendance: 5,317; Referees: Miguel Ángel Pérez Pérez, Vicente Bultó, Carlos Merino

6 January 2019 15	San Pablo Burgos	80–85	FC Barcelona Lassa	Burgos
18:00	Scoring by quarter: 17–23, 21–17, 19–26, 23–19
	Pts: Benite 19; Rebs: Lima 7 Asts: Fitipaldo, Frazier 5 PIR: Benite, Fitipaldo 19	Boxscore	Pts: Tomić 23; Rebs: Tomić 9 Asts: Ribas 6 PIR: Tomić 37	Arena: Coliseum Burgos; Attendance: 9,035; Referees: Daniel Hierrezuelo, Jacobo Rial, Alberto Baena

13 January 2019 16	FC Barcelona Lassa	94–80	Cafés Candelas Breogán	Barcelona
20:30	Scoring by quarter: 27–20, 23–18, 27–28, 17–14
	Pts: Hanga 24; Rebs: Šmits 8 Asts: Heurtel 5 PIR: Hanga 29	Boxscore	Pts: Cvetković 16; Rebs: four players 4 Asts: Millsap 4 PIR: Cvetković 14	Arena: Palau Blaugrana; Attendance: 3,769; Referees: Juan Carlos García González, Francisco Araña, Raúl Zamorano

20 January 2019 17	Kirolbet Baskonia	73–82	FC Barcelona Lassa	Vitoria-Gasteiz
19:30	Scoring by quarter: 19–15, 19–21, 23–26, 12–20
	Pts: Hilliard 18; Rebs: Diop, Poirier 4 Asts: Huertas 7 PIR: Shields 17	Boxscore	Pts: Tomić 17; Rebs: Tomić 9 Asts: Heurtel 7 PIR: Tomić 21	Arena: Buesa Arena; Attendance: 10,739; Referees: Fernando Calatrava, Luis Miguel Castillo, Iyán González

27 January 2019 18	FC Barcelona Lassa	94–83	Unicaja	Barcelona
19:30	Scoring by quarter: 17–15, 14–26, 25–18, 28–24
	Pts: Hanga, Pangos 16; Rebs: Singleton 9 Asts: Pangos 7 PIR: Séraphin, Singleton 22	Boxscore	Pts: Boatright 17; Rebs: Shermadini 8 Asts: Boatright 5 PIR: Boatright 19	Arena: Palau Blaugrana; Attendance: 4,931; Referees: Emilio Pérez Pizarro, Rafael Serrano, Alfonso Olivares

2 February 2019 19	Iberostar Tenerife	63–57	FC Barcelona Lassa	San Cristóbal de La Laguna
18:00	Scoring by quarter: 16–13, 19–11, 9–16, 19–17
	Pts: Abromaitis 20; Rebs: Beirán 11; Asts: Beirán, San Miguel 5 PIR: Abromaitis 25	Boxscore	Pts: Pangos 12; Rebs: Hanga 10; Asts: Hanga 6 PIR: Hanga 27	Arena: Santiago Martín; Attendance: 5,119; Referees: Antonio Conde, Vicente Bultó, Rubén Sánchez Mohedas

9 February 2019 20	FC Barcelona Lassa	106–76	Montakit Fuenlabrada	Barcelona
18:00	Scoring by quarter: 24–15, 35–21, 17–22, 30–18
	Pts: Séraphin 20; Rebs: Séraphin 7 Asts: Heurtel 9 PIR: Séraphin 30	Boxscore	Pts: Cruz 22; Rebs: O'Leary, Popović 5 Asts: Bellas, Clark 4 PIR: Cruz 24	Arena: Palau Blaugrana; Attendance: 5,049; Referees: Carlos Cortés, Martín Caballero, Javier Torres

3 March 2019 21	UCAM Murcia	71–70	FC Barcelona Lassa	Murcia
17:00	Scoring by quarter: 13–18, 21–15, 16–16, 21–21
	Pts: Booker 18; Rebs: Rojas 7 Asts: Booker 6 PIR: Booker 13	Boxscore	Pts: Kuric 14; Rebs: Tomić 10; Asts: Pangos 3 PIR: Tomić 17	Arena: Palacio de Deportes; Attendance: 6,726; Referees: Fernando Calatrava, Juan de Dios Oyón, Carlos Merino

10 March 2019 22	FC Barcelona Lassa	97–88	San Pablo Burgos	Barcelona
17:00	Scoring by quarter: 27–22, 26–14, 21–18, 23–34
	Pts: Ribas 20; Rebs: Tomić 13; Asts: Heurtel 7 PIR: Ribas 23	Boxscore	Pts: Sutton 17; Rebs: Huskić 7 Asts: Sutton 4 PIR: Sutton 20	Arena: Palau Blaugrana; Attendance: 4,910; Referees: Jordi Aliaga, Luis Miguel Castillo, Esperanza Mendoza

17 March 2019 23	FC Barcelona Lassa	90–76	Movistar Estudiantes	Barcelona
18:30	Scoring by quarter: 10–22, 26–17, 34–20, 20–17
	Pts: Tomić 18; Rebs: Claver 7 Asts: Heurtel 12; PIR: Tomić 24	Boxscore	Pts: Clavell 18; Rebs: Vicedo 6 Asts: Cook 7 PIR: Clavell 14	Arena: Palau Blaugrana; Attendance: 4,833; Referees: José Antonio Martín Bertrán, Rafael Serrano, Javier Torres

24 March 2019 24	Real Madrid	76–82	FC Barcelona Lassa	Madrid
19:30	Scoring by quarter: 17–17, 23–28, 17–17, 19–20
	Pts: Carroll 15; Rebs: Randolph, Tavares 7 Asts: three players 3 PIR: Randolph 17	Boxscore	Pts: Heurtel 15; Rebs: Oriola, Tomić 6 Asts: Tomić 7 PIR: Claver, Oriola 16	Arena: WiZink Center; Attendance: 12,120; Referees: Antonio Conde, Fernando Calatrava, Alberto Sánchez Sixto

31 March 2019 25	FC Barcelona Lassa	107–71	BAXI Manresa	Barcelona
17:00	Scoring by quarter: 32–14, 27–16, 18–19, 30–22
	Pts: Kuric, Singleton 15; Rebs: Šmits 6 Asts: Pangos 8 PIR: Kuric 18	Boxscore	Pts: four players 10; Rebs: three players 4 Asts: Toolson 4 PIR: Lalanne 16	Arena: Palau Blaugrana; Attendance: 6,522; Referees: Carlos Cortés, Vicente Bultó, Arnau Padrós

7 April 2019 26	Cafés Candelas Breogán	75–92	FC Barcelona Lassa	Lugo
19:30	Scoring by quarter: 21–15, 17–31, 12–25, 25–21
	Pts: McCallum 12; Rebs: Brown, Gerun 10; Asts: McCallum 5 PIR: Brown 23	Boxscore	Pts: Singleton 18; Rebs: Hanga, Singleton 5 Asts: Heurtel, Pangos 6 PIR: Singleton 21	Arena: Pazo dos Deportes; Attendance: 5,217; Referees: José Antonio Martín Bertrán, Martín Caballero, Iyán González

13 April 2019 27	Tecnyconta Zaragoza	86–91	FC Barcelona Lassa	Zaragoza
18:00	Scoring by quarter: 32–23, 20–28, 21–16, 13–24
	Pts: Okoye 20; Rebs: Okoye 11; Asts: Alocén 5 PIR: Okoye 20	Boxscore	Pts: Hanga 15; Rebs: Claver 8 Asts: Heurtel 13; PIR: Heurtel 24	Arena: Pabellón Príncipe Felipe; Attendance: 7,898; Referees: Juan Carlos García González, Francisco Araña, Rubén Sánchez Mohedas

3 May 2019 28	FC Barcelona Lassa	72–84	Kirolbet Baskonia	Barcelona
21:00	Scoring by quarter: 18–17, 16–15, 17–25, 21–27
	Pts: Hanga 19; Rebs: Oriola 8 Asts: Hanga 5 PIR: Hanga 20	Boxscore	Pts: Shengelia, Shields 18; Rebs: Poirier, Shields 8 Asts: Huertas 7 PIR: Poirier, Shields 21	Arena: Palau Blaugrana; Attendance: 4,577; Referees: Carlos Peruga, Juan de Dios Oyón, Alfonso Olivares

28 April 2019 29	Divina Seguros Joventut	89–77	FC Barcelona Lassa	Badalona
19:30	Scoring by quarter: 20–15, 19–19, 29–18, 21–25
	Pts: Harangody 16; Rebs: Harangody 16; Asts: Harangody 5 PIR: Harangody 26	Boxscore	Pts: Singleton 16; Rebs: Singleton 6 Asts: Ribas 5 PIR: Singleton 24	Arena: Olímpic de Badalona; Attendance: 6,567; Referees: José Antonio Martín Bertrán, Luis Miguel Castillo, Alberto Baena

5 May 2019 30	Herbalife Gran Canaria	77–97	FC Barcelona Lassa	Las Palmas
19:30	Scoring by quarter: 13–21, 19–28, 14–24, 31–24
	Pts: Wiley 19; Rebs: Wiley 8 Asts: Hannah 4 PIR: Wiley 20	Boxscore	Pts: Heurtel 20; Rebs: Claver 9 Asts: Heurtel 7 PIR: Heurtel 28	Arena: Gran Canaria Arena; Attendance: 6,291; Referees: Daniel Hierrezuelo, Rafael Serrano, Jacobo Rial

10 May 2019 31	FC Barcelona Lassa	72–78	Valencia Basket	Barcelona
21:30	Scoring by quarter: 14–12, 17–18, 17–26, 24–22
	Pts: Heurtel 18; Rebs: three players 5 Asts: Heurtel 6 PIR: Heurtel 26	Boxscore	Pts: Dubljević 14; Rebs: three players 5 Asts: van Rossom 5 PIR: Dubljević 21	Arena: Palau Blaugrana; Attendance: 4,207; Referees: Emilio Pérez Pizarro, Sergio Manuel, Arnau Padrós

12 May 2019 32	MoraBanc Andorra	79–82	FC Barcelona Lassa	Andorra la Vella
19:30	Scoring by quarter: 29–16, 19–23, 14–27, 17–16
	Pts: Diagne 16; Rebs: Diagne 5 Asts: Albicy 8 PIR: Diagne 19	Boxscore	Pts: Heurtel 19; Rebs: Hanga 6 Asts: Heurtel, Pangos 3 PIR: Heurtel 16	Arena: Poliesportiu d'Andorra; Attendance: 4,113; Referees: Antonio Conde, Vicente Bultó, Javier Torres

19 May 2019 33	FC Barcelona Lassa	88–71	Delteco GBC	Barcelona
12:30	Scoring by quarter: 18–11, 24–16, 22–21, 24–23
	Pts: Heurtel 22; Rebs: Hanga 10; Asts: Pangos 6 PIR: Heurtel 26	Boxscore	Pts: Burjanadze 16; Rebs: Bobrov 6 Asts: Pérez, Rebec 6 PIR: Burjanadze 17	Arena: Palau Blaugrana; Attendance: 5,203; Referees: Carlos Cortés, Martín Caballero, Raúl Zamorano

26 May 2019 34	Monbus Obradoiro	63–83	FC Barcelona Lassa	Santiago de Compostela
12:30	Scoring by quarter: 20–16, 16–19, 12–22, 15–26
	Pts: Sàbat 15; Rebs: Singler 6 Asts: Llovet 5 PIR: Sàbat 16	Boxscore	Pts: Hanga 17; Rebs: Claver 10; Asts: Heurtel 8 PIR: Heurtel 22	Arena: Fontes do Sar; Attendance: 5,316; Referees: Emilio Pérez Pizarro, Rafael Serrano, Alberto Sánchez Sixto

=== ACB Playoffs ===
==== Quarterfinals ====
31 May 2019 1	FC Barcelona Lassa	87–61	Divina Seguros Joventut	Barcelona
21:30	Scoring by quarter: 29–20, 6–11, 25–15, 27–15
	Pts: Heurtel 17; Rebs: Tomić 11; Asts: Heurtel 3 PIR: Singleton 25	Boxscore	Pts: Boungou Colo 13; Rebs: López-Arostegui 6 Asts: Ventura 5 PIR: Boungou Colo 12	Arena: Palau Blaugrana; Attendance: 6,395; Referees: Fernando Calatrava, Juan de Dios Oyón, Alfonso Olivares

2 June 2019 2	Divina Seguros Joventut	86–107	FC Barcelona Lassa	Badalona
19:00	Scoring by quarter: 19–28, 21–20, 25–31, 21–28
	Pts: Laprovíttola 22; Rebs: Todorović 6 Asts: Laprovíttola 11; PIR: Laprovíttola 41	Boxscore	Pts: Heurtel 32; Rebs: Hanga 7 Asts: Heurtel 9 PIR: Heurtel 44	Arena: Olímpic de Badalona; Attendance: 7,114; Referees: Daniel Hierrezuelo, Rafael Serrano, Francisco Araña

==== Semifinals ====
7 June 2019 1	FC Barcelona Lassa	101–59	Tecnyconta Zaragoza	Barcelona
21:00	Scoring by quarter: 26–14, 25–12, 24–11, 26–22
	Pts: Kuric 25; Rebs: Singleton 8 Asts: Heurtel 8 PIR: Kuric 28	Boxscore	Pts: Barreiro, Seibutis 9 Rebs: Justiz 7 Asts: Alocén 3 PIR: McCalebb 10	Arena: Palau Blaugrana; Attendance: 5,679; Referees: Antonio Conde, Óscar Perea, Jacobo Rial

9 June 2019 2	FC Barcelona Lassa	76–70	Tecnyconta Zaragoza	Barcelona
21:00	Scoring by quarter: 14–21, 22–19, 25–11, 15–19
	Pts: Heurtel 21; Rebs: Oriola 10; Asts: Pangos 5 PIR: Heurtel 18	Boxscore	Pts: Radović, Seibutis 12; Rebs: Radović 9 Asts: Alocén 4 PIR: Radović 16	Arena: Palau Blaugrana; Attendance: 5,891; Referees: Carlos Peruga, Jordi Aliaga, Raúl Zamorano

11 June 2019 3	Tecnyconta Zaragoza	81–96	FC Barcelona Lassa	Zaragoza
21:00	Scoring by quarter: 19–23, 18–27, 21–19, 23–27
	Pts: Justiz 24; Rebs: Justiz 9 Asts: three players 3 PIR: Justiz 32	Boxscore	Pts: Kuric 27; Rebs: Tomić 11; Asts: Heurtel 5 PIR: Kuric 27	Arena: Pabellón Príncipe Felipe; Attendance: 9,411; Referees: Daniel Hierrezuelo, Fernando Calatrava, Luis Miguel Castillo

==== Finals ====
15 June 2019 1	Real Madrid	87–67	FC Barcelona Lassa	Madrid
21:00	Scoring by quarter: 22–17, 25–15, 16–20, 24–15
	Pts: Campazzo 19; Rebs: Ayón 7 Asts: Campazzo, Llull 4 PIR: Campazzo 24	Boxscore	Pts: Heurtel 14; Rebs: Claver 12; Asts: Heurtel, Pangos 3 PIR: Claver 17	Arena: WiZink Center; Attendance: 11,876; Referees: Carlos Peruga, Fernando Calatrava, Luis Miguel Castillo

17 June 2019 2	Real Madrid	81–80	FC Barcelona Lassa	Madrid
21:00	Scoring by quarter: 11–17, 18–17, 24–25, 28–21
	Pts: Carroll 25; Rebs: Tavares 9 Asts: Llull 5 PIR: Carroll 28	Boxscore	Pts: Heurtel 30; Rebs: Tomić 7 Asts: three players 2 PIR: Heurtel 28	Arena: WiZink Center; Attendance: 12,247; Referees: José Antonio Martín Bertrán, Antonio Conde, Rafael Serrano

19 June 2019 3	FC Barcelona Lassa	78–77	Real Madrid	Barcelona
21:00	Scoring by quarter: 19–18, 15–22, 22–18, 22–19
	Pts: Heurtel 21; Rebs: Claver 7 Asts: Hanga, Heurtel 4 PIR: Heurtel 19	Boxscore	Pts: Campazzo, Thompkins 18; Rebs: Randolph, Tavares 3 Asts: Campazzo 4 PIR: Campazzo 26	Arena: Palau Blaugrana; Attendance: 7,238; Referees: Daniel Hierrezuelo, Carlos Cortés, Vicente Bultó

21 June 2019 4	FC Barcelona Lassa	68–74	Real Madrid	Barcelona
21:00	Scoring by quarter: 21–24, 12–13, 14–18, 21–19
	Pts: Pangos 16; Rebs: Tomić 6 Asts: Pangos 4 PIR: Singleton 13	Boxscore	Pts: Campazzo 15; Rebs: Tavares 13; Asts: Campazzo 6 PIR: Campazzo 28	Arena: Palau Blaugrana; Attendance: 7,301; Referees: Antonio Conde, Carlos Peruga, Fernando Calatrava

=== EuroLeague ===
==== League table ====
Pos	Team	Pld	W	L	PF	PA	PD	Qualification
3	(Spain) Real Madrid	30	22	8	2578	2342	+236	Advance to playoffs
4	(Turkey) Anadolu Efes	30	20	10	2562	2406	+156	Advance to playoffs
5	(Spain) Barcelona Lassa	30	18	12	2358	2282	+76	Advance to playoffs
6	(Greece) Panathinaikos OPAP	30	16	14	2382	2345	+37	Advance to playoffs
7	(Spain) Kirolbet Baskonia	30	15	15	2449	2378	+71	Advance to playoffs

Source: EuroLeague
Rules for classification: All points scored in extra period(s) will not be counted in the standings, nor for any tie-break situation.

==== Results summary ====
Overall						Home					Away				
Pld	W	L	PF	PA	PD	W	L	PF	PA	PD	W	L	PF	PA	PD
30	18	12	2358	2282	+76	12	3	1207	1076	+131	6	9	1151	1206	−55

Last updated: 17 July 2025.
Source: Competitive matches

==== Results by round ====
Round	1	2	3	4	5	6	7	8	9	10	11	12	13	14	15	16	17	18	19	20	21	22	23	24	25	26	27	28	29	30
Ground	A	A	H	A	H	A	A	A	H	H	A	A	H	A	H	H	A	H	A	H	A	H	H	H	A	A	H	A	H	H
Result	L	L	W	W	W	W	W	L	W	L	L	L	L	W	W	W	W	W	L	L	W	W	W	W	L	L	W	L	W	W
Position	14	15	10	9	6	6	6	7	6	7	7	9	11	9	7	6	6	6	6	6	5	5	5	5	5	5	5	5	5	5

Source: Competitive matches
A = Away; H = Home; W = Win; L = Loss; P = Postponed

==== Matches ====
11 October 2018 1	CSKA Moscow (Russian Basketball Federation)	95–75	(Spanish Basketball Federation) FC Barcelona Lassa	Moscow
19:00	Scoring by quarter: 21–17, 30–12, 18–29, 26–17
	Pts: Higgins 18; Rebs: Clyburn 9 Asts: Clyburn, Rodríguez 4 PIR: Clyburn 22	Boxscore	Pts: Kuric 15; Rebs: Claver 10; Asts: Heurtel 12; PIR: Claver 12	Arena: Megasport Arena; Attendance: 12,023; Referees: Robert Lottermoser, Matej Boltauzer, Michele Rossi

16 October 2018 2	Herbalife Gran Canaria (Spanish Basketball Federation)	87–86	(Spanish Basketball Federation) FC Barcelona Lassa	Las Palmas
21:00	Scoring by quarter: 18–26, 26–18, 20–25, 23–17
	Pts: Evans 19; Rebs: Evans 4 Asts: Evans 5 PIR: Evans 24	Boxscore	Pts: Kuric 24; Rebs: Tomić 5 Asts: Pangos 5 PIR: Kuric 25	Arena: Gran Canaria Arena; Attendance: 5,285; Referees: Damir Javor, Anne Panther, Ioannis Foufis

18 October 2018 3	FC Barcelona Lassa (Spain)	83–73	(Germany) Bayern Munich	Barcelona
21:00	Scoring by quarter: 26–17, 18–19, 21–18, 18–19
	Pts: Tomić 18; Rebs: three players 5 Asts: Tomić 5 PIR: Tomić 25	Boxscore	Pts: Lô 16; Rebs: Lučić 4 Asts: Đedović 4 PIR: Lô 20	Arena: Palau Blaugrana; Attendance: 4,372; Referees: Christos Christodoulou, Carmelo Paternicò, Gytis Vilius

26 October 2018 4	Darüşşafaka Tekfen (Turkey)	71–79	(Spain) FC Barcelona Lassa	Istanbul
19:15	Scoring by quarter: 18–23, 22–24, 24–11, 7–21
	Pts: Eric 17; Rebs: Eric 9 Asts: Özmızrak 3 PIR: Eric 25	Boxscore	Pts: Singleton 18; Rebs: Séraphin 6 Asts: Heurtel, Pangos 5 PIR: Singleton, Tomić 22	Arena: Volkswagen Arena; Attendance: 3,908; Referees: Sreten Radović, Fernando Rocha, Hugues Thépénier

1 November 2018 5	FC Barcelona Lassa (Spain)	74–58	(Israel) Maccabi Tel Aviv	Barcelona
21:00	Scoring by quarter: 18–12, 16–21, 25–7, 15–18
	Pts: Claver 14; Rebs: Tomić 8 Asts: Pangos 6 PIR: Claver 22	Boxscore	Pts: Caloiaro 11; Rebs: Tyus 8 Asts: Roll 6 PIR: Tyus 15	Arena: Palau Blaugrana; Attendance: 6,772; Referees: Matej Boltauzer, Milivoje Jovčić, Petri Mäntylä

9 November 2018 6	Khimki (Russia)	80–87	(Spain) FC Barcelona Lassa	Mytishchi
18:00	Scoring by quarter: 23–19, 15–19, 21–29, 21–20
	Pts: Shved 27; Rebs: Thomas 6 Asts: Shved 6 PIR: Shved 28	Boxscore	Pts: Heurtel 18; Rebs: Tomić 6 Asts: Heurtel 8 PIR: Tomić 27	Arena: Mytishchi Arena; Attendance: 7,151; Referees: Luigi Lamonica, Borys Ryzhyk, Milija Vojinović

16 November 2018 7	Žalgiris (Lithuania)	85–88(OT)	(Spain) FC Barcelona Lassa	Kaunas
19:00	Scoring by quarter: 18–23, 16–16, 16–21, 26–16, Overtime: 9–12
	Pts: White 21; Rebs: White 8 Asts: Walkup, Wolters 6 PIR: White 31	Boxscore	Pts: Kuric 15; Rebs: Singleton 7 Asts: Pangos 5 PIR: Kuric 17	Arena: Žalgirio Arena; Attendance: 15,126; Referees: Ilija Belošević, Piotr Pastusiak, Mehdi Difallah

21 November 2018 8	Panathinaikos OPAP (Greece)	76–70	(Spain) FC Barcelona Lassa	Athens
20:00	Scoring by quarter: 13–10, 21–15, 21–25, 21–20
	Pts: Thomas 14; Rebs: Calathes 9 Asts: Calathes 12; PIR: Lasme 16	Boxscore	Pts: Kuric 17; Rebs: four players 5 Asts: Heurtel 4 PIR: Séraphin 21	Arena: Olympic Sports Center; Attendance: 10,935; Referees: Robert Lottermoser, Sreten Radović, Oļegs Latiševs

23 November 2018 9	FC Barcelona Lassa (Spain)	90–80	(Italy) AX Armani Exchange Olimpia	Barcelona
21:00	Scoring by quarter: 24–25, 29–17, 21–12, 16–26
	Pts: Heurtel 20; Rebs: Séraphin 7 Asts: Heurtel 6 PIR: Heurtel 25	Boxscore	Pts: James 19; Rebs: Brooks 7 Asts: James 10; PIR: James 23	Arena: Palau Blaugrana; Attendance: 5,239; Referees: Christos Christodoulou, Tomislav Hordov, Amit Balak

30 November 2018 10	FC Barcelona Lassa (Spain)	65–84	(Turkey) Fenerbahçe Beko	Barcelona
21:00	Scoring by quarter: 17–23, 19–22, 11–19, 18–20
	Pts: Hanga 16; Rebs: Hanga 6 Asts: Heurtel 4 PIR: Hanga 25	Boxscore	Pts: Dixon 16; Rebs: Veselý 8 Asts: Gudurić, Veselý 4 PIR: Gudurić 24	Arena: Palau Blaugrana; Attendance: 6,013; Referees: Luigi Lamonica, Elias Koromilas, Milan Nedović

6 December 2018 11	Budućnost VOLI (Montenegro)	67–64	(Spain) FC Barcelona Lassa	Podgorica
19:00	Scoring by quarter: 14–15, 17–18, 15–13, 21–18
	Pts: Clark, Gordić 12; Rebs: three players 5 Asts: Jackson 5 PIR: Clark 19	Boxscore	Pts: Hanga 12; Rebs: Singleton 10; Asts: Heurtel 4 PIR: Hanga 16	Arena: Morača; Attendance: 5,239; Referees: Borys Ryzhyk, Spiros Gkontas, Sašo Petek

13 December 2018 12	Real Madrid (Spain)	92–65	(Spain) FC Barcelona Lassa	Madrid
21:00	Scoring by quarter: 22–17, 31–13, 16–20, 23–15
	Pts: Thompkins 17; Rebs: Thompkins 7 Asts: Campazzo 6 PIR: Thompkins 20	Boxscore	Pts: Heurtel 16; Rebs: three players 4 Asts: Heurtel 5 PIR: Heurtel 14	Arena: WiZink Center; Attendance: 11,953; Referees: Ilija Belošević, Robert Lottermoser, Sérgio Silva

18 December 2018 13	FC Barcelona Lassa (Spain)	60–69	(Greece) Olympiacos	Barcelona
20:45	Scoring by quarter: 14–17, 16–15, 18–23, 12–14
	Pts: Claver 13; Rebs: Oriola 6 Asts: Heurtel 3 PIR: Claver 15	Boxscore	Pts: Milutinov 18; Rebs: Milutinov 14; Asts: Williams-Goss 4 PIR: Milutinov 36	Arena: Palau Blaugrana; Attendance: 4,954; Referees: Sreten Radović, Oļegs Latiševs, Gytis Vilius

20 December 2018 14	Kirolbet Baskonia (Spain)	70–77	(Spain) FC Barcelona Lassa	Vitoria-Gasteiz
21:00	Scoring by quarter: 16–19, 23–23, 16–7, 15–28
	Pts: Janning 19; Rebs: Janning, Poirier 6 Asts: Huertas 4 PIR: Janning 19	Boxscore	Pts: Pangos 16; Rebs: Claver 6 Asts: Heurtel 6 PIR: Heurtel 17	Arena: Fernando Buesa Arena; Attendance: 11,018; Referees: Christos Christodoulou, Petri Mäntylä, Milan Nedović

27 December 2018 15	FC Barcelona Lassa (Spain)	80–65	(Turkey) Anadolu Efes	Barcelona
21:00	Scoring by quarter: 23–29, 16–21, 20–7, 21–8
	Pts: Oriola 14; Rebs: Séraphin 8 Asts: Pangos 5 PIR: four players 15	Boxscore	Pts: Motum 13; Rebs: Motum, Simon 6 Asts: Micić 7 PIR: Dunston 15	Arena: Palau Blaugrana; Attendance: 5,969; Referees: Saša Pukl, Borys Ryzhyk, Tomasz Trawicki

4 January 2019 16	FC Barcelona Lassa (Spain)	97–65	(Turkey) Darüşşafaka Tekfen	Barcelona
21:00	Scoring by quarter: 29–16, 25–11, 19–18, 24–20
	Pts: Heurtel 18; Rebs: Hanga 7 Asts: Heurtel 4 PIR: Heurtel 26	Boxscore	Pts: Douglas 23; Rebs: Douglas 6 Asts: McCallum 4 PIR: Douglas 14	Arena: Palau Blaugrana; Attendance: 6,008; Referees: Elias Koromilas, Tomislav Hordov, Mehdi Difallah

9 January 2019 17	AX Armani Exchange Olimpia (Italy)	85–90	(Spain) FC Barcelona Lassa	Assago
20:45	Scoring by quarter: 16–17, 21–19, 20–29, 28–25
	Pts: James, Micov 20; Rebs: Gudaitis, James 7 Asts: James 8 PIR: James 33	Boxscore	Pts: Heurtel 21; Rebs: Tomić 8 Asts: Heurtel, Ribas 6 PIR: Heurtel 27	Arena: Mediolanum Forum; Attendance: 8,190; Referees: Matej Boltauzer, Milivoje Jovčić, Joseph Bissang

11 January 2019 18	FC Barcelona Lassa (Spain)	79–68	(Greece) Panathinaikos OPAP	Barcelona
21:00	Scoring by quarter: 17–13, 20–23, 19–16, 23–16
	Pts: Heurtel 23; Rebs: Tomić 8 Asts: three players 3 PIR: Heurtel 22	Boxscore	Pts: Papapetrou 17; Rebs: Gist 4 Asts: Calathes 5 PIR: Papapetrou 20	Arena: Palau Blaugrana; Attendance: 5,934; Referees: Sreten Radović, Carmelo Paternicò, Emin Moğulkoç

17 January 2019 19	Maccabi Tel Aviv (Israel)	99–83	(Spain) FC Barcelona Lassa	Tel Aviv
20:05	Scoring by quarter: 23–20, 34–15, 28–17, 14–31
	Pts: Black 16; Rebs: O'Bryant 7 Asts: Kane 5 PIR: Black 24	Boxscore	Pts: Ribas 13; Rebs: Blažič 6 Asts: Ribas 5 PIR: Ribas 17	Arena: Menora Mivtachim Arena; Attendance: 11,011; Referees: Damir Javor, Piotr Pastusiak, Gytis Vilius

25 January 2019 20	FC Barcelona Lassa (Spain)	76–84	(Russia) CSKA Moscow	Barcelona
21:00	Scoring by quarter: 20–20, 21–24, 20–19, 15–21
	Pts: Claver 17; Rebs: Oriola, Tomić 5 Asts: Pangos 9 PIR: Claver 16	Boxscore	Pts: De Colo 25; Rebs: Clyburn 10; Asts: Rodríguez 7 PIR: De Colo 27	Arena: Palau Blaugrana; Attendance: 6,007; Referees: Ilija Belošević, Fernando Rocha, Mehdi Difallah

31 January 2019 21	Olympiacos (Greece)	55–76	(Spain) FC Barcelona Lassa	Piraeus
20:00	Scoring by quarter: 6–27, 22–11, 15–17, 12–21
	Pts: Milutinov, Strēlnieks 13; Rebs: Milutinov 8 Asts: Milutinov, Spanoulis 3 PIR: Milutinov 29	Boxscore	Pts: Singleton 18; Rebs: Oriola 6 Asts: Pangos 8 PIR: Pangos 19	Arena: Peace and Friendship Stadium; Attendance: 10,207; Referees: Borys Ryzhyk, Milivoje Jovčić, Tomislav Hordov

7 February 2019 22	FC Barcelona Lassa (Spain)	78–72	(Lithuania) Žalgiris	Barcelona
21:00	Scoring by quarter: 23–20, 22–18, 15–24, 18–10
	Pts: Hanga 14; Rebs: Oriola, Singleton 7 Asts: Heurtel 4 PIR: Tomić 20	Boxscore	Pts: Milaknis 17; Rebs: White 8 Asts: Wolters 7 PIR: White 18	Arena: Palau Blaugrana; Attendance: 5,416 (tentative); Referees: Saša Pukl, Elias Koromilas, Miloš Koljenšić

21 February 2019 23	FC Barcelona Lassa (Spain)	77–67	(Spain) Kirolbet Baskonia	Barcelona
21:00	Scoring by quarter: 22–9, 24–17, 16–19, 15–22
	Pts: Ribas, Séraphin 15; Rebs: Séraphin, Singleton 6 Asts: Heurtel 9 PIR: Heurtel 21	Boxscore	Pts: Shields 18; Rebs: Poirier 8 Asts: Huertas 6 PIR: Shields 15	Arena: Palau Blaugrana; Attendance: 5,638; Referees: Christos Christodoulou, Carmelo Paternicò, Sašo Petek

1 March 2019 24	FC Barcelona Lassa (Spain)	77–70	(Spain) Real Madrid	Barcelona
21:00	Scoring by quarter: 16–17, 26–20, 14–14, 21–19
	Pts: Tomić 22; Rebs: Tomić 13; Asts: Heurtel 10; PIR: Tomić 28	Boxscore	Pts: Fernández 15; Rebs: Randolph 9 Asts: Llull 4 PIR: Randolph 16	Arena: Palau Blaugrana; Attendance: 7,311; Referees: Matej Boltauzer, Ilija Belošević, Emin Moğulkoç

8 March 2019 25	Anadolu Efes (Turkey)	92–70	(Spain) FC Barcelona Lassa	Istanbul
18:30	Scoring by quarter: 24–12, 18–19, 22–22, 28–17
	Pts: Larkin 37; Rebs: Moerman 11; Asts: Micić, Simon 4 PIR: Larkin 43	Boxscore	Pts: Hanga 14; Rebs: Tomić 7 Asts: three players 4 PIR: Tomić 21	Arena: Sinan Erdem Dome; Attendance: 14,161; Referees: Milivoje Jovčić, Fernando Rocha, Jurgis Laurinavicius

15 March 2019 26	Fenerbahçe Beko (Turkey)	88–82	(Spain) FC Barcelona Lassa	Istanbul
18:45	Scoring by quarter: 16–23, 21–15, 15–23, 36–21
	Pts: Sloukas 22; Rebs: Melli 5 Asts: Sloukas 11; PIR: Sloukas 30	Boxscore	Pts: Blažič 15; Rebs: Tomić 5 Asts: Heurtel 6 PIR: Tomić 21	Arena: Ülker Sports and Event Hall; Attendance: 12,628; Referees: Luigi Lamonica, Sreten Radović, Gytis Vilius

19 March 2019 27	FC Barcelona Lassa (Spain)	93–64	(Spain) Herbalife Gran Canaria	Barcelona
21:00	Scoring by quarter: 22–19, 16–16, 25–11, 30–18
	Pts: Pangos 19; Rebs: four players 5 Asts: Heurtel 9 PIR: Pangos 22	Boxscore	Pts: Strawberry 15; Rebs: Balvín 10; Asts: Balvín 4 PIR: Strawberry 14	Arena: Palau Blaugrana; Attendance: 5,312; Referees: Christos Christodoulou, Piotr Pastusiak, Josip Radojkovic

21 March 2019 28	Bayern Munich (Germany)	73–71	(Spain) FC Barcelona Lassa	Munich
20:00	Scoring by quarter: 18–19, 14–17, 17–20, 24–15
	Pts: Booker, Koponen 14; Rebs: Đedović 6 Asts: Lučić 6 PIR: Booker, Koponen 18	Boxscore	Pts: Heurtel, Tomić 13; Rebs: Singleton, Tomić 6 Asts: Tomić 5 PIR: Tomić 25	Arena: Audi Dome; Attendance: 5,151; Referees: Borys Ryzhyk, Damir Javor, Milija Vojinović

28 March 2019 29	FC Barcelona Lassa (Spain)	95–83	(Montenegro) Budućnost VOLI	Barcelona
21:00	Scoring by quarter: 21–22, 23–24, 28–23, 23–14
	Pts: Hanga 18; Rebs: Tomić 9 Asts: Heurtel 6 PIR: Hanga 26	Boxscore	Pts: Nikolić 25; Rebs: three players 4 Asts: Barović 4 PIR: Nikolić 22	Arena: Palau Blaugrana; Attendance: 4,784; Referees: Carmelo Paternico, Petri Mäntylä, Saulius Racys

5 April 2019 30	FC Barcelona Lassa (Spain)	83–74	(Russia) Khimki	Barcelona
21:00	Scoring by quarter: 21–32, 23–11, 10–15, 29–16
	Pts: Oriola 14; Rebs: Singleton, Tomić 6 Asts: Pangos 6 PIR: Tomić 19	Boxscore	Pts: Jenkins, Monia 13; Rebs: Monia 6 Asts: Harrison, Zubkov 4 PIR: Monia, Zubkov 15	Arena: Palau Blaugrana; Attendance: 4,975; Referees: Matej Boltauzer, Tomislav Hordov, Amit Balak

=== EuroLeague Playoffs ===
==== Playoff series ====
17 April 2019 1	Anadolu Efes (Turkish Basketball Federation)	75–68	(Spanish Basketball Federation) FC Barcelona Lassa	Istanbul
19:00	Scoring by quarter: 26–15, 14–21, 18–13, 17–19
	Pts: Micić 21; Rebs: three players 5 Asts: Micić 7 PIR: Micić 30	Boxscore	Pts: Tomić 14; Rebs: Hanga 11; Asts: Heurtel 5 PIR: Hanga 15	Arena: Sinan Erdem Dome; Attendance: 14,958; Referees: Saša Pukl, Robert Lottermoser, Elias Koromilas

19 April 2019 2	Anadolu Efes (Turkey)	72–74	(Spain) FC Barcelona Lassa	Istanbul
19:15	Scoring by quarter: 16–19, 18–19, 25–24, 13–12
	Pts: Larkin 18; Rebs: Moerman 6 Asts: Micić 4 PIR: Larkin 18	Boxscore	Pts: Hanga 17; Rebs: Tomić 7 Asts: Oriola 5 PIR: Hanga 21	Arena: Sinan Erdem Dome; Attendance: 15,125; Referees: Borys Ryzhyk, Oļegs Latiševs, Mehdi Difallah

24 April 2019 3	FC Barcelona Lassa (Spain)	68–102	(Turkey) Anadolu Efes	Barcelona
21:00	Scoring by quarter: 20–26, 19–26, 18–32, 11–18
	Pts: Hanga 13; Rebs: Singleton 6 Asts: Hanga, Pangos 3 PIR: Hanga 17	Boxscore	Pts: Larkin 30; Rebs: Dunston 10; Asts: Micić, Simon 8 PIR: Larkin 34	Arena: Palau Blaugrana; Attendance: 7,049; Referees: Christos Christodoulou, Saša Pukl, Anne Panther

26 April 2019 4	FC Barcelona Lassa (Spain)	82–72	(Turkey) Anadolu Efes	Barcelona
21:00	Scoring by quarter: 15–22, 21–16, 27–12, 19–22
	Pts: Kuric 19; Rebs: Claver 8 Asts: three players 4 PIR: Claver 20	Boxscore	Pts: Larkin 20; Rebs: Dunston 5 Asts: Micić 4 PIR: Larkin 29	Arena: Palau Blaugrana; Attendance: 6,734; Referees: Robert Lottermoser, Sreten Radović, Fernando Rocha

1 May 2019 5	Anadolu Efes (Turkey)	80–71	(Spain) FC Barcelona Lassa	Istanbul
19:30	Scoring by quarter: 23–28, 24–14, 14–15, 19–14
	Pts: Larkin, Moerman 18; Rebs: three players 4 Asts: Micić 10; PIR: Larkin 19	Boxscore	Pts: Heurtel, Singleton 12; Rebs: Singleton 8 Asts: Heurtel, Ribas 4 PIR: Singleton 20	Arena: Sinan Erdem Dome; Attendance: 15,249; Referees: Matej Boltauzer, Borys Ryzhyk, Mehdi Difallah

=== Copa del Rey ===
==== Quarterfinals ====
14 February 2019	FC Barcelona Lassa	86–79	Valencia Basket	Madrid
21:30	Scoring by quarter: 13–21, 24–18, 21–19, 28–21
	Pts: Heurtel 17; Rebs: Tomić 8 Asts: Heurtel 4 PIR: Tomić 21	Boxscore	Pts: Dubljević 13; Rebs: Dubljević 5 Asts: Vives 7 PIR: Tobey 15	Arena: WiZink Center; Attendance: 11,511; Referees: José Antonio Martín Bertrán, Daniel Hierrezuelo, Fernando Calatrava

==== Semifinals ====
16 February 2019	FC Barcelona Lassa	92–74	Iberostar Tenerife	Madrid
19:00	Scoring by quarter: 17–15, 24–14, 31–23, 20–34
	Pts: Ribas 14; Rebs: Séraphin, Tomić 4 Asts: Heurtel, Pangos 3 PIR: Ribas 16	Boxscore	Pts: Abromaitis 24; Rebs: Iverson 8 Asts: Beirán 4 PIR: Abromaitis 28	Arena: WiZink Center; Attendance: 13,109; Referees: Emilio Pérez Pizarro, Antonio Conde, Carlos Peruga

==== Final ====
17 February 2019	Real Madrid	93–94(OT)	FC Barcelona Lassa	Madrid
19:30	Scoring by quarter: 16–20, 19–15, 25–11, 17–31, Overtime: 16–17
	Pts: Campazzo 19; Rebs: Ayón 8 Asts: Ayón, Campazzo 5 PIR: Ayón 21	Boxscore	Pts: Heurtel 22; Rebs: Singleton 9 Asts: Heurtel 6 PIR: Heurtel 22	Arena: WiZink Center; Attendance: 13,109; Referees: Juan Carlos García González, Miguel Ángel Pérez Pérez, Benjamín Jiménez

=== Supercopa de España ===
==== Semifinals ====
21 September 2018	FC Barcelona Lassa	76–79	Kirolbet Baskonia	Santiago de Compostela
19:00	Scoring by quarter: 21–22, 13–27, 22–17, 20–13
	Pts: Kuric 16; Rebs: Tomić 7 Asts: Pangos 8 PIR: Pangos 20	Boxscore	Pts: Garino 16; Rebs: Voigtmann 13; Asts: Granger, Huertas 5 PIR: Garino 18	Arena: Pavillón Multiusos Fontes do Sar; Attendance: 5,295; Referees: Daniel Hierrezuelo, Emilio Pérez Pizarro, Carlos Peruga

== Individual awards ==
=== Liga ACB ===
Player of the Round

- (France) Kevin Séraphin – Round 14
- (Croatia) Ante Tomić – Round 15
- (France) Thomas Heurtel – Round 30

Player of the Month

- (Croatia) Ante Tomić – March

All-Liga ACB Second Team

- (France) Thomas Heurtel

=== EuroLeague ===
MVP of the Round

- (Croatia) Ante Tomić – Round 24

=== Copa del Rey ===
MVP

- (France) Thomas Heurtel
