= 2019 EuroLeague Playoffs =

The 2018–19 EuroLeague Playoffs were played from 16 April 2019 to 1 May. Eight teams competed in the Playoffs. The winners qualified for the 2019 EuroLeague Final Four.

== Format ==
In the playoffs, series are best-of-five, so the first team to win three games wins the series. A 2–2–1 format will be used – the team with home-court advantage will play games 1, 2 and 5 at home while their opponents will host games 3 and 4. Games 4 and 5 will only be played when necessary.

== Qualified teams ==
Pos	Team	Pld	W	L	PF	PA	PD	Seeding
1	(Turkey) Fenerbahçe Beko	30	25	5	2504	2237	+267	Seeded in quarterfinals
2	(Russia) CSKA Moscow	30	24	6	2590	2397	+193	Seeded in quarterfinals
3	(Spain) Real Madrid	30	22	8	2578	2342	+236	Seeded in quarterfinals
4	(Turkey) Anadolu Efes	30	20	10	2562	2406	+156	Seeded in quarterfinals
5	(Spain) Barcelona Lassa	30	18	12	2358	2282	+76	Unseeded in quarterfinals
6	(Greece) Panathinaikos OPAP	30	16	14	2382	2345	+37	Unseeded in quarterfinals
7	(Spain) Kirolbet Baskonia	30	15	15	2449	2378	+71	Unseeded in quarterfinals
8	(Lithuania) Žalgiris	30	15	15	2360	2323	+37	Unseeded in quarterfinals

Source: EuroLeague

== Series ==
Team 1	Series	Team 2	Game 1	Game 2	Game 3	Game 4	Game 5
Fenerbahçe Beko (Turkey)	3–1	(Lithuania) Žalgiris	76–43	80–82	66–57	99–82	
CSKA Moscow (Russia)	3–1	(Spain) Kirolbet Baskonia	94–68	68–78	84–77	92–83	
Real Madrid (Spain)	3–0	(Greece) Panathinaikos OPAP	75–72	78–63	89–82		
Anadolu Efes (Turkey)	3–2	(Spain) Barcelona Lassa	75–68	72–74	102–68	72–82	80–71

== Games ==
=== Game 1 ===
16 April 2019	CSKA Moscow (Russia)	94–68 (Series: 1–0)	(Spain) Kirolbet Baskonia	Moscow
19:00	Scoring by quarter: 23–24, 21–16, 29–12, 21–16
	Pts: Rodríguez 19; Rebs: Clyburn 6 Asts: Rodríguez 5 PIR: Rodríguez 21	Boxscore	Pts: Shields 17; Rebs: Poirier, Voigtmann 5 Asts: Voigtmann 5 PIR: Poirier 14	Arena: Megasport Arena; Attendance: 6,252; Referees: (Italy) Luigi Lamonica, (Latvia) Oļegs Latiševs, (Germany) Anne Panther

16 April 2019	Fenerbahçe Beko (Turkey)	76–43 (Series: 1–0)	(Lithuania) Žalgiris	Istanbul
19:45	Scoring by quarter: 15–13, 23–8, 21–14, 17–8
	Pts: Kalinić 16; Rebs: Düverioğlu 7 Asts: Gudurić 4 PIR: Gudurić, Kalinić 14	Boxscore	Pts: Grigonis 10; Rebs: Thompson 6 Asts: Westermann 3 PIR: Grigonis 10	Arena: Ülker Sports and Event Hall; Attendance: 12,503; Referees: (Greece) Christos Christodoulou, (Serbia) Ilija Belošević, (Slovenia) Matej Boltauzer

17 April 2019	Anadolu Efes (Turkey)	75–68 (Series: 1–0)	(Spain) Barcelona Lassa	Istanbul
19:00	Scoring by quarter: 26–15, 14–21, 18–13, 17–19
	Pts: Micić 21; Rebs: three players 5 Asts: Micić 7 PIR: Micić 30	Boxscore	Pts: Tomić 14; Rebs: Hanga 11; Asts: Heurtel 5 PIR: Hanga 15	Arena: Sinan Erdem Dome; Attendance: 14,958 (tentative); Referees: (Slovenia) Saša Pukl, (Germany) Robert Lottermoser, (Greece) Elias Koromilas

17 April 2019	Real Madrid (Spain)	75–72 (Series: 1–0)	(Greece) Panathinaikos OPAP	Madrid
21:15	Scoring by quarter: 21–17, 22–18, 15–17, 17–20
	Pts: Taylor 13; Rebs: Tavares 8 Asts: Campazzo 6 PIR: Tavares 19	Boxscore	Pts: Calathes 17; Rebs: Papapetrou 7 Asts: Calathes 4 PIR: Papapetrou, Vougioukas 11	Arena: WiZink Center; Attendance: 10,159; Referees: (Ukraine) Borys Ryzhyk, (Croatia) Sreten Radović, (France) Mehdi Difallah

=== Game 2 ===
18 April 2019	CSKA Moscow (Russia)	68–78 (Series: 1–1)	(Spain) Kirolbet Baskonia	Moscow
19:00	Scoring by quarter: 18–27, 19–15, 15–24, 16–12
	Pts: Higgins 15; Rebs: Clyburn, Hines 6 Asts: Higgins, Rodríguez 3 PIR: Clyburn 16	Boxscore	Pts: Hilliard 16; Rebs: Poirier 15; Asts: Huertas 6 PIR: Poirier 32	Arena: Megasport Arena; Attendance: 7,512; Referees: (Serbia) Ilija Belošević, (Slovenia) Matej Boltauzer, (Italy) Carmelo Paternicò

18 April 2019	Fenerbahçe Beko (Turkey)	80–82 (Series: 1–1)	(Lithuania) Žalgiris	Istanbul
19:45	Scoring by quarter: 21–20, 18–26, 19–27, 22–9
	Pts: Datome 17; Rebs: Datome 9 Asts: Sloukas 6 PIR: Datome 22	Boxscore	Pts: Ulanovas 20; Rebs: Ulanovas 7 Asts: three players 3 PIR: Ulanovas 29	Arena: Ülker Sports and Event Hall; Attendance: 12,635; Referees: (Italy) Luigi Lamonica, (Poland) Piotr Pastusiak, (Slovenia) Milan Nedović

19 April 2019	Anadolu Efes (Turkey)	72–74 (Series: 1–1)	(Spain) Barcelona Lassa	Istanbul
19:15	Scoring by quarter: 16–19, 18–19, 25–24, 13–12
	Pts: Larkin 18; Rebs: Moerman 6 Asts: Micić 4 PIR: Larkin 18	Boxscore	Pts: Hanga 17; Rebs: Tomić 7 Asts: Oriola 5 PIR: Hanga 21	Arena: Sinan Erdem Dome; Attendance: 15,125 (tentative); Referees: (Ukraine) Borys Ryzhyk, (Latvia) Oļegs Latiševs, (France) Mehdi Difallah

19 April 2019	Real Madrid (Spain)	78–63 (Series: 2–0)	(Greece) Panathinaikos OPAP	Madrid
21:15	Scoring by quarter: 21–8, 14–18, 26–15, 17–22
	Pts: Campazzo 13; Rebs: Campazzo 7 Asts: Campazzo 9 PIR: Campazzo 26	Boxscore	Pts: Thomas 13; Rebs: three players 4 Asts: Calathes 7 PIR: Thomas 12	Arena: WiZink Center; Attendance: 10,751; Referees: (Germany) Robert Lottermoser, (Slovenia) Saša Pukl, (Lithuania) Gytis Vilius

=== Game 3 ===
23 April 2019	Žalgiris (Lithuania)	57–66 (Series: 1–2)	(Turkey) Fenerbahçe Beko	Kaunas
19:00	Scoring by quarter: 19–15, 15–16, 12–18, 11–17
	Pts: Wolters 15; Rebs: Thompson 7 Asts: Grigonis, Wolters 3 PIR: Ulanovas, Wolters 11	Boxscore	Pts: Gudurić 17; Rebs: Datome 7 Asts: Sloukas 3 PIR: Gudurić 21	Arena: Žalgirio Arena; Attendance: 15,517; Referees: (Ukraine) Borys Ryzhyk, (Croatia) Sreten Radović, (France) Mehdi Difallah

23 April 2019	Panathinaikos OPAP (Greece)	82–89 (Series: 0–3)	(Spain) Real Madrid	Athens
20:00	Scoring by quarter: 18–23, 23–13, 17–22, 24–31
	Pts: Calathes 17; Rebs: Papapetrou, Vougioukas 5 Asts: Calathes 7 PIR: three players 17	Boxscore	Pts: Campazzo, Fernández 16; Rebs: Tavares 7 Asts: Campazzo 10; PIR: Campazzo 29	Arena: Olympic Sports Center; Attendance: 18,182; Referees: (Italy) Luigi Lamonica, (Slovenia) Matej Boltauzer, (Turkey) Emin Moğulkoç

24 April 2019	Kirolbet Baskonia (Spain)	77–84 (Series: 1–2)	(Russia) CSKA Moscow	Vitoria-Gasteiz
20:30	Scoring by quarter: 18–28, 21–18, 20–16, 18–22
	Pts: Poirier 19; Rebs: Poirier 15; Asts: Huertas 5 PIR: Poirier 34	Boxscore	Pts: De Colo 28; Rebs: Clyburn, Hines 7 Asts: Rodríguez 7 PIR: De Colo 32	Arena: Fernando Buesa Arena; Attendance: 12,847; Referees: (Germany) Robert Lottermoser, (Portugal) Fernando Rocha, (Lithuania) Gytis Vilius

24 April 2019	Barcelona Lassa (Spain)	68–102 (Series: 1–2)	(Turkey) Anadolu Efes	Barcelona
21:00	Scoring by quarter: 20–26, 19–26, 18–32, 11–18
	Pts: Hanga 13; Rebs: Singleton 6 Asts: Hanga, Pangos 3 PIR: Hanga 17	Boxscore	Pts: Larkin 30; Rebs: Dunston 10; Asts: Micić, Simon 8 PIR: Larkin 34	Arena: Palau Blaugrana; Attendance: 7,049; Referees: (Greece) Christos Christodoulou, (Slovenia) Saša Pukl, (Germany) Anne Panther

=== Game 4 ===
25 April 2019	Žalgiris (Lithuania)	82–99 (Series: 1–3)	(Turkey) Fenerbahçe Beko	Kaunas
19:00	Scoring by quarter: 16–30, 25–19, 20–23, 21–27
	Pts: Davies 25; Rebs: Davies 7 Asts: Westermann 6 PIR: Davies 35	Boxscore	Pts: Dixon 25; Rebs: Sloukas 5 Asts: Sloukas 10; PIR: Dixon 32	Arena: Žalgirio Arena; Attendance: 15,177; Referees: (Slovenia) Matej Boltauzer, (Latvia) Oļegs Latiševs, (Greece) Elias Koromilas

26 April 2019	Kirolbet Baskonia (Spain)	83–92 (Series: 1–3)	(Russia) CSKA Moscow	Vitoria-Gasteiz
20:30	Scoring by quarter: 22–20, 26–19, 23–29, 12–24
	Pts: Poirier 21; Rebs: Voigtmann 6 Asts: Hilliard, Huertas 5 PIR: Poirier 31	Boxscore	Pts: De Colo 27; Rebs: Kurbanov 7 Asts: De Colo 4 PIR: De Colo 35	Arena: Fernando Buesa Arena; Attendance: 12,572; Referees: (Italy) Luigi Lamonica, (Slovenia) Saša Pukl, (Turkey) Emin Moğulkoç

26 April 2019	Barcelona Lassa (Spain)	82–72 (Series: 2–2)	(Turkey) Anadolu Efes	Barcelona
21:00	Scoring by quarter: 15–22, 21–16, 27–12, 19–22
	Pts: Kuric 19; Rebs: Claver 8 Asts: three players 4 PIR: Claver 20	Boxscore	Pts: Larkin 20; Rebs: Dunston 5 Asts: Micić 4 PIR: Larkin 29	Arena: Palau Blaugrana; Attendance: 6,734; Referees: (Germany) Robert Lottermoser, (Croatia) Sreten Radović, (Portugal) Fernando Rocha

=== Game 5 ===
1 May 2019	Anadolu Efes (Turkey)	80–71 (Series: 3–2)	(Spain) Barcelona Lassa	Istanbul
19:30	Scoring by quarter: 23–28, 24–14, 14–15, 19–14
	Pts: Larkin, Moerman 18; Rebs: three players 4 Asts: Micić 10; PIR: Larkin 19	Boxscore	Pts: Heurtel, Singleton 12; Rebs: Singleton 8 Asts: Heurtel, Ribas 4 PIR: Singleton 20	Arena: Sinan Erdem Dome; Attendance: 15,249; Referees: (Slovenia) Matej Boltauzer, (Ukraine) Borys Ryzhyk, (France) Mehdi Difallah
