= Kevin Séraphin =

French basketball player (born 1989)

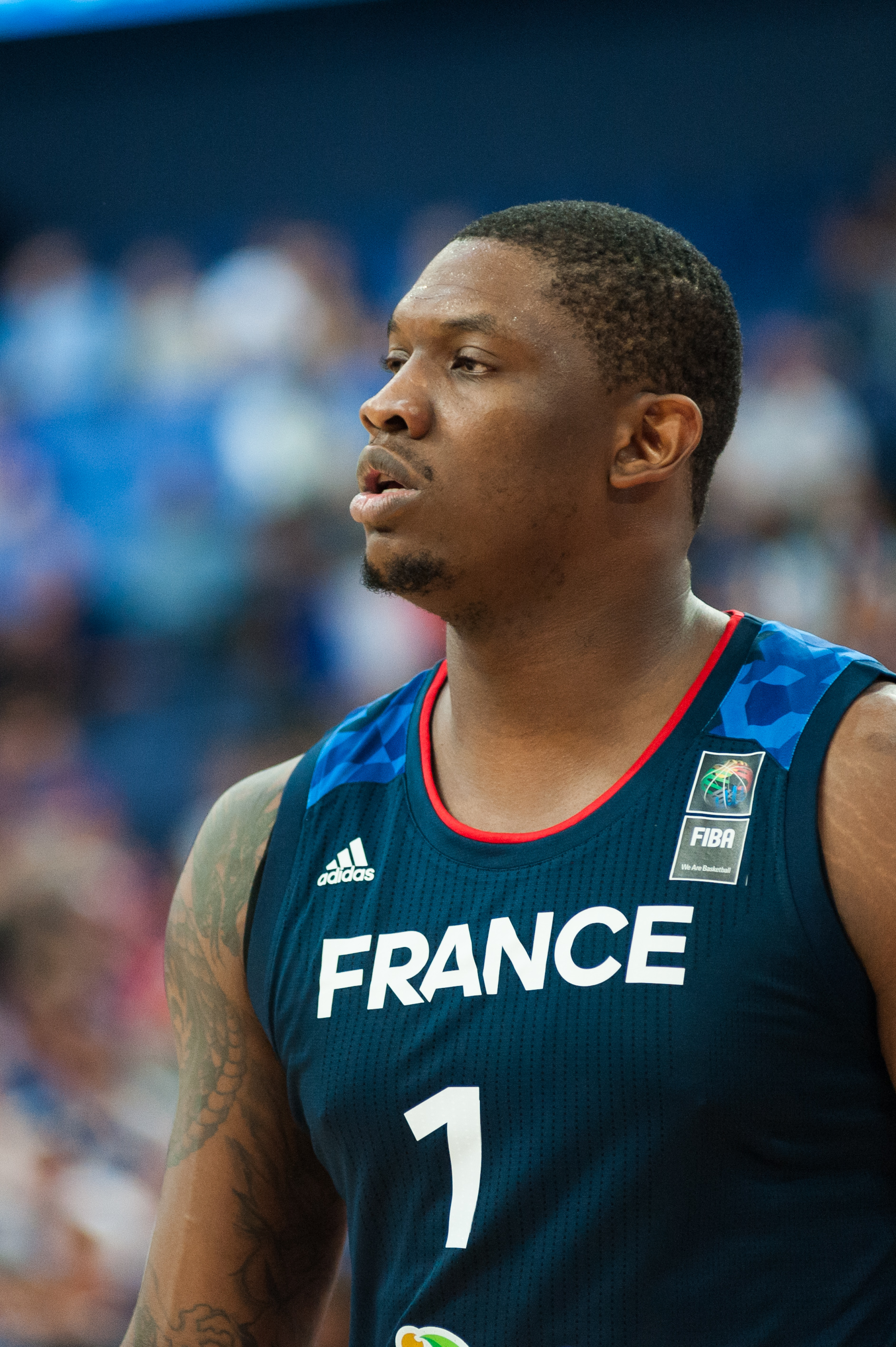
- Séraphin with France in 2017

Personal information
- Born: 7 December 1989 (age 36) Cayenne, French Guiana, France
- Listed height: 6 ft 10 in (2.08 m)
- Listed weight: 278 lb (126 kg)

Career information
- NBA draft: 2010: 1st round, 17th overall pick
- Drafted by: Chicago Bulls
- Playing career: 2007–2019
- Position: Center / power forward
- Number: 13, 1

Career history
- 2007–2010: Cholet Basket
- 2010–2015: Washington Wizards
- 2011: Caja Laboral
- 2015–2016: New York Knicks
- 2016–2017: Indiana Pacers
- 2017–2019: FC Barcelona

Career highlights
- 2× Spanish Cup champion (2018, 2019); French League champion (2010); French League Most Improved Player (2010)

Career statistics
- Points: 2,516 (5.9 ppg)
- Rebounds: 1,462 (3.5 rpg)
- Blocks: 304 (.7 bpg)
- Stats at NBA.com
- Stats at Basketball Reference
Medals
Men's basketball
Representing France
EuroBasket
Silver medal – second place	2011 Lithuania

Kevin Séraphin (born 7 December 1989) is a French former professional basketball player. Standing 6 feet 10 inches (2.08 m) tall, Séraphin played at both the power forward and center positions in his playing career. Séraphin started his professional basketball career in Cholet Basket, and was drafted 17th overall in the 2010 NBA draft by the Chicago Bulls, but was later traded to the Washington Wizards.

== Professional career ==
=== Cholet Basket (2007–2010) ===
In December 2007, Séraphin joined the Cholet Basket senior team for the first time after having played for their junior team since 2006. In August 2009, he signed a three-year contract extension with Cholet. In the 2009–10 season, he played 32 games, averaging 6.0 points and 4.2 rebounds per game as he went on to help Cholet win the 2009–10 Pro A championship. He also earned the 2010 Most Improved Player award.

=== Washington Wizards (2010–2015) ===
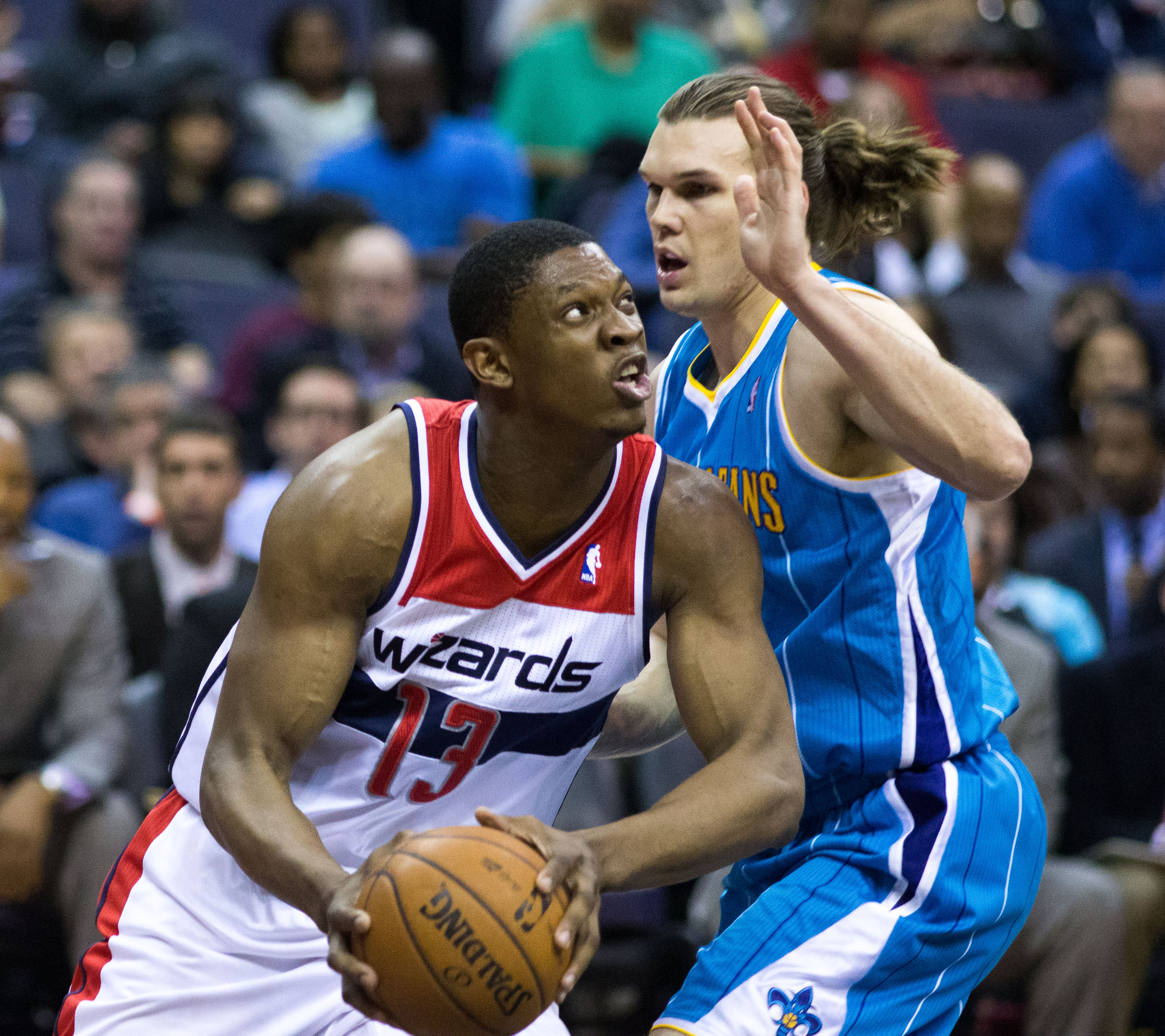
Séraphin against Lou Amundson

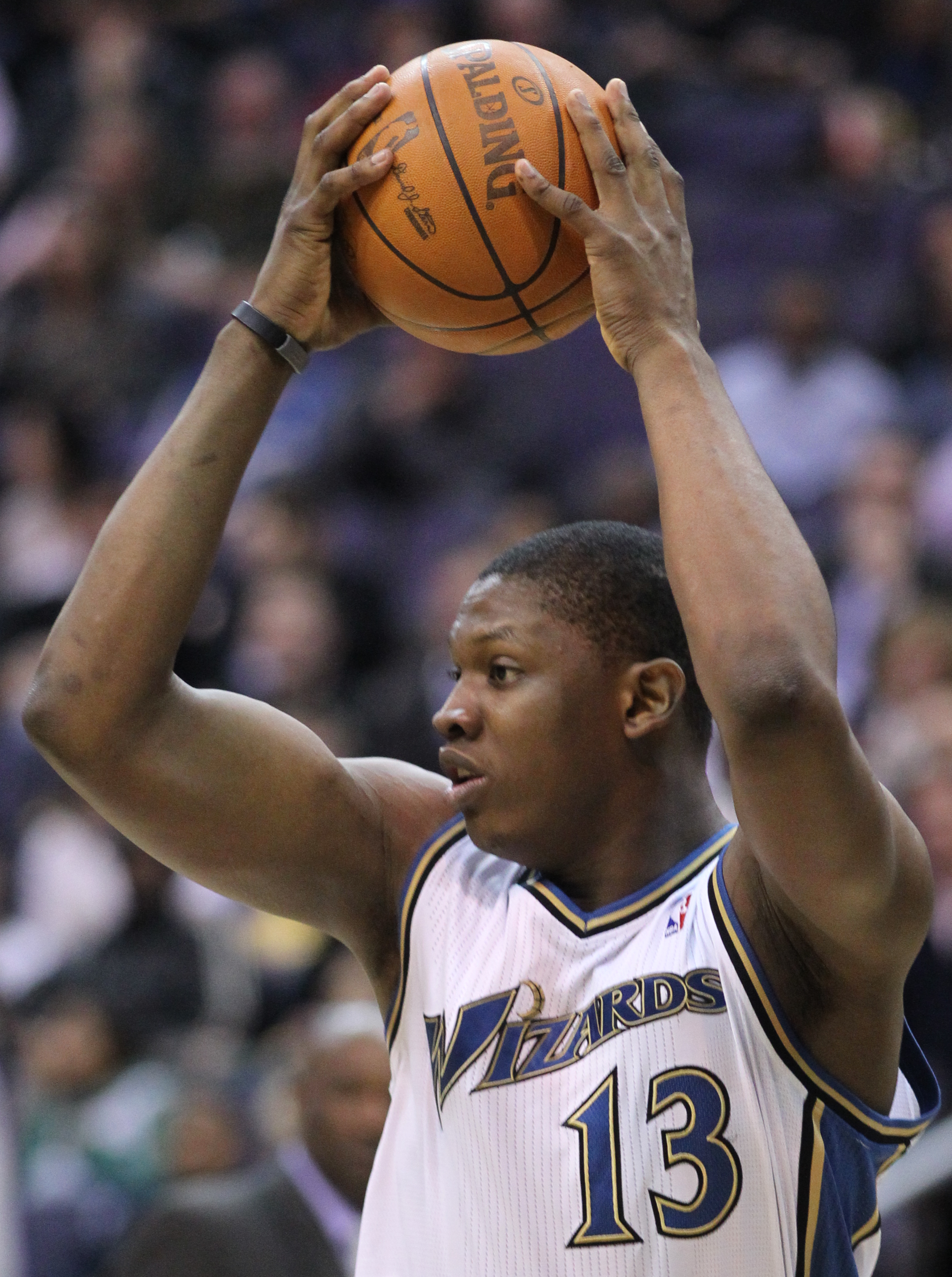
Kevin Seraphin grabbing a rebound

On 24 June 2010 Séraphin was selected with the 17th overall pick in the 2010 NBA draft by the Chicago Bulls. On 8 July 2010 he was traded, along with Kirk Hinrich and cash considerations, to the Washington Wizards in exchange for the rights to Vladimir Veremeenko. On 30 July 2010 he signed his rookie scale contract with the Wizards.

On 20 September 2011 Séraphin signed with Caja Laboral of Spain for the duration of the NBA lockout. In December 2011, he returned to the Wizards following the conclusion of the lockout.

On 30 June 2014 the Wizards tendered a $3.89 million qualifying offer to make Séraphin a restricted free agent. On 18 July 2014 he accepted the one-year, $3.89 million qualifying offer.

=== New York Knicks (2015–2016) ===
On 6 August 2015 Séraphin signed with the New York Knicks.

=== Indiana Pacers (2016–2017) ===
On 8 September 2016 Séraphin signed with the Indiana Pacers. On 31 July 2017 he was waived by the Pacers.

=== Barcelona (2017–2019) ===
On 4 August 2017 Séraphin signed a two-year deal with FC Barcelona Lassa of the Liga ACB. On 17 February 2019 he won 2019 Copa del Rey, recording six points and one rebound in a 94–93 win over Real Madrid.

On 24 October 2020 Séraphin announced he was retiring from professional basketball, citing a knee injury.

== Career statistics ==
Legend
GP	Games played	GS	Games started	MPG	Minutes per game
FG%	Field-goal percentage	3P%	3-point field-goal percentage	FT%	Free-throw percentage
RPG	Rebounds per game	APG	Assists per game	SPG	Steals per game
BPG	Blocks per game	PPG	Points per game	PIR	Performance index rating
**Bold**	Career high

=== NBA ===
==== Regular season ====
Year	Team	GP	GS	MPG	FG%	3P%	FT%	RPG	APG	SPG	BPG	PPG
2010–11	Washington	58	1	10.9	.449	—	.710	2.6	.3	**.3**	.5	2.7
2011–12	Washington	57	**21**	20.6	.531	.000	.671	**4.9**	.6	**.3**	**1.3**	7.9
2012–13	Washington	**79**	8	**21.8**	.461	—	.693	4.4	**.7**	**.3**	.7	**9.1**
2013–14	Washington	53	1	10.9	.505	—	**.871**	2.4	.3	.1	.5	4.7
2014–15	Washington	**79**	0	15.6	.513	.000	.707	3.6	.7	.1	.7	6.6
2015–16	New York	48	0	11.0	.410	.000	.826	2.6	**1.0**	.2	.8	3.9
2016–17	Indiana	49	3	11.4	**.551**	.000	.636	2.9	.5	.1	.4	4.7
Career		423	34	15.2	.489	.000	.715	3.5	.6	.2	.7	5.9

==== Playoffs ====
Year	Team	GP	GS	MPG	FG%	3P%	FT%	RPG	APG	SPG	BPG	PPG
2014	Washington	4	0	1.5	.000	—	—	.5	.0	.0	.0	.0
2015	Washington	**6**	0	12.0	**.484**	—	.500	3.2	.3	**.3**	.2	5.5
2017	Indiana	4	0	**14.8**	.462	—	**.714**	**3.5**	**1.0**	.0	**.5**	**7.3**
Career		14	0	9.8	.450	—	.615	2.5	.4	.1	.2	4.4

=== EuroLeague ===
Year	Team	GP	GS	MPG	FG%	3P%	FT%	RPG	APG	SPG	BPG	PPG	PIR
2011–12	Caja Laboral	7	5	19.1	.551	—	**.800**	**5.0**	.6	**.4**	**1.0**	8.9	9.4
2017–18	FC Barcelona	15	**14**	**20.3**	.579	**.000**	.655	4.9	**.9**	.3	.9	**12.1**	**12.5**
2018–19	FC Barcelona	**27**	2	14.1	**.632**	—	.786	3.6	.5	.2	.4	8.3	7.7
Career		49	21	16.7	.599	.000	.720	4.2	.6	.3	.6	9.6	9.4

== National team career ==
Séraphin was named to the All-Tournament team of the 2009 FIBA Europe Under-20 Championship, after helping France to win the silver medal. He was a member of the senior French national basketball team in 2011, where France reached the finals of the EuroBasket 2011, which they lost to Spain. He played for France at the 2012 Summer Olympics.

== See also ==
- List of European basketball players in the United States
