= 2019 Copa del Rey de Baloncesto =

Basketball competition in Spain

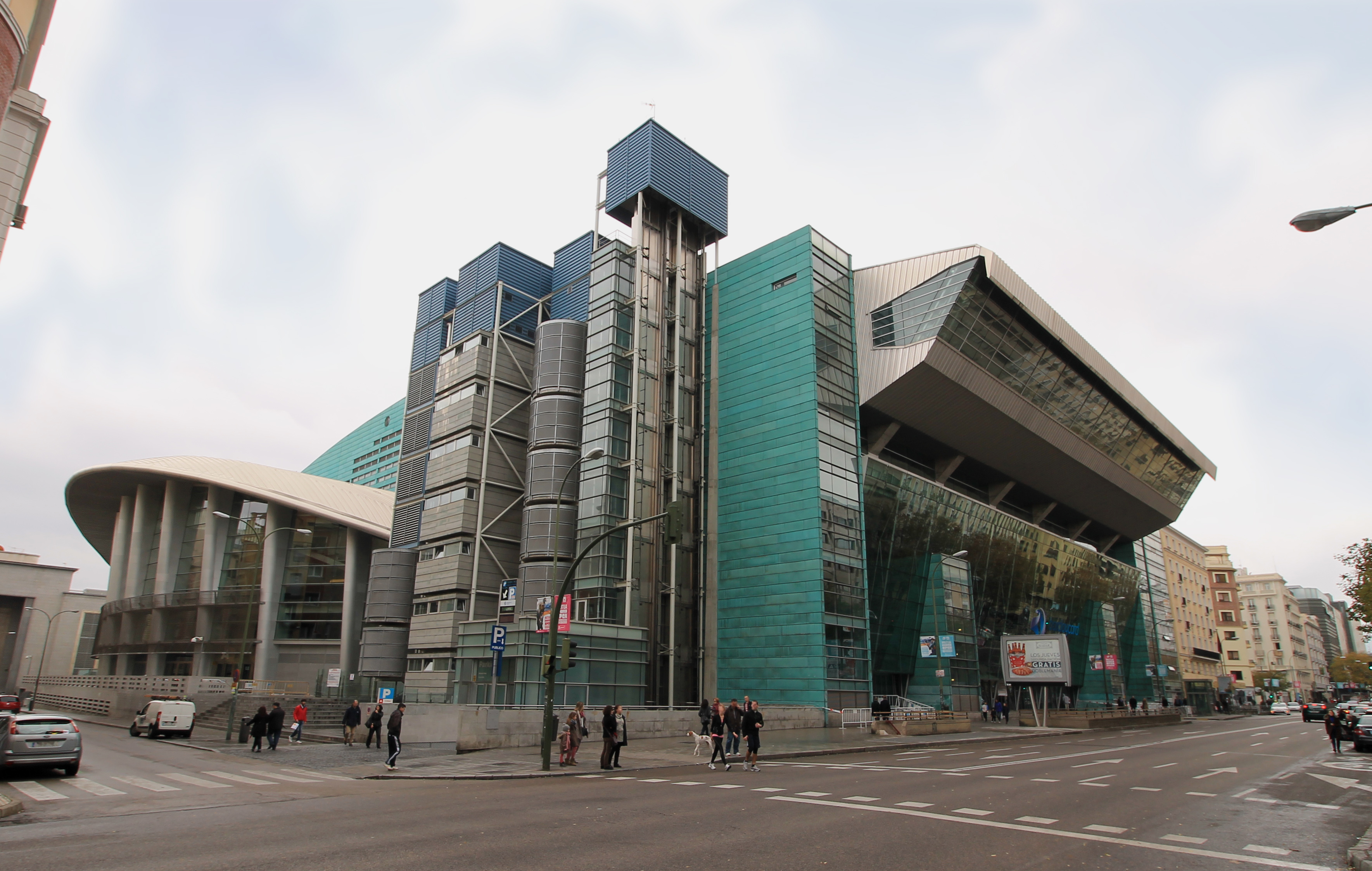
- The WiZink Center hosted the Copa del Rey

Tournament details
- Country: Spain
- City: Madrid
- Venue: WiZink Center
- Dates: 14–17 February 2019
- Teams: 8
- Defending champions: Barça Lassa

Final positions
- Champions: Barça Lassa (25th title)
- Runners-up: Real Madrid
- Semifinalists: Iberostar Tenerife; Divina Seguros Joventut

Tournament statistics
- Matches played: 7
- Attendance: 86,377 (12,340 per match)

Awards
- MVP: (France) Thomas Heurtel (Barça Lassa)
- All statistics correct as of 17 February 2019.

The 2019 Copa del Rey de Baloncesto was the 83rd edition of the Spanish King's Basketball Cup. It was managed by the ACB and was held in Madrid, in the WiZink Center in February 2019. Barça Lassa defended successfully the title and conquered its second consecutive cup, 25th overall.

All times were in Central European Time (UTC+01:00).

== Qualified teams ==
The top seven ranking teams after the first half of the 2018–19 ACB regular season and one team from the Community of Madrid qualified for the tournament. As one team from the Community of Madrid, Real Madrid, was among the seven highest ranking teams, the second highest ranking team from the Community of Madrid, Movistar Estudiantes, entered the Copa del Rey.

Pos	Team	Pld	W	L	PF	PA	PD	Seeding
1	Barça Lassa	17	15	2	1491	1284	+207	Qualified as seeded teams
2	Real Madrid (H)	17	13	4	1504	1351	+153	Qualified as seeded teams
3	Kirolbet Baskonia	17	12	5	1429	1217	+212	Qualified as seeded teams
4	Iberostar Tenerife	17	11	6	1388	1279	+109	Qualified as seeded teams
5	Unicaja	17	11	6	1436	1382	+54	
6	Valencia Basket	17	11	6	1348	1305	+43	
7	Divina Seguros Joventut	17	10	7	1327	1321	+6	
14	Movistar Estudiantes (H)	17	6	11	1363	1427	−64	

Source: ACB
(H) Hosts

== Draw ==
The 2019 Copa del Rey de Baloncesto was drawn on 21 January 2019 at approximately 12:00 and was broadcast live on YouTube and on TV in many countries. The seeded teams were paired in the quarterfinals with the non-seeded teams. There were not any restrictions for the draw of the semifinals. As in recent seasons, the first qualified team plays its quarterfinal game on Thursday.

== Bracket ==
Quarterfinals
14 February
Barça Lassa	86
Valencia Basket	79
14 February
Iberostar Tenerife	88
Unicaja	78
15 February
Kirolbet Baskonia	89
Divina Seguros Joventut	98
15 February
Real Madrid	94
Movistar Estudiantes	63

Semifinals
16 February
Barça Lassa	92
Iberostar Tenerife	86
16 February
Divina Seguros Joventut	81
Real Madrid	93

Final
17 February
Barça Lassa	94
Real Madrid	93

== Quarterfinals ==
=== Iberostar Tenerife vs. Unicaja ===
14 February 2019	Iberostar Tenerife	88–78	Unicaja	Madrid
19:00	Scoring by quarter: 25–20, 19–16, 22–20, 22–22
	Pts: Iverson 19; Rebs: Beirán 7 Asts: San Miguel 5 PIR: Iverson 24	Boxscore	Pts: Milosavljević 16; Rebs: Lessort 7 Asts: Suárez, Wiltjer 2 PIR: Milosavljević 17	Arena: WiZink Center; Attendance: 9,318; Referees: Juan Carlos García González, Emilio Pérez Pizarro, Jordi Aliaga

Starters:			Pts	Reb	Ast
G	00	(Spain) Rodrigo San Miguel	9	4	5
C	4	(United States) Colton Iverson	19	5	0
F	21	(United States) Tim Abromaitis	12	5	3
F	33	(Spain) Javier Beirán	10	7	3
G	34	(United States) Davin White	7	1	0
Reserves:					
G	1	(Germany) Lucca Staiger	0	0	0
G	5	(Argentina) Nicolás Richotti	0	1	1
C	7	(Senegal) Mamadou Niang	4	4	1
F	9	(Argentina) Nicolás Brussino	8	1	2
G	10	(Spain) Ferrán Bassas	16	0	2
F	11	(Spain) Sebas Saiz	0	1	0
F	31	(Belgium) Pierre-Antoine Gillet	3	2	1
Head coach:
(Spanish Basketball Federation) Txus Vidorreta

Iberostar Tenerife	Unicaja

Tenerife	Statistics	Unicaja
22/35 (62%)	2 point field goals	16/26 (61%)
9/19 (47%)	3 point field goals	12/34 (35%)
17/25 (68%)	Free throws	10/11 (90%)
35	Rebounds	23
18	Assists	10
6	Steals	7
16	Turnovers	13
1	Blocks	2

Starters:			Pts	Reb	Ast
G	3	(Spain) Jaime Fernández	13	1	1
G	12	(Serbia) Dragan Milosavljević	16	1	1
C	17	(Georgia (country)) Giorgi Shermadini	8	3	0
G	22	(United States) Brian Roberts	7	1	1
F	33	(Canada) Kyle Wiltjer	7	3	2
Reserves:					
G	1	(Armenia) Ryan Boatright	5	1	1
C	2	(Republic of the Congo) Viny Okouo	DNP		
G	10	(Finland) Sasu Salin	11	1	1
F	11	(Spain) Dani Díez	0	3	0
F	21	(Poland) Adam Waczyński	3	1	0
C	26	(France) Mathias Lessort	3	7	1
F	43	(Spain) Carlos Suárez	5	1	2
Head coach:
(Spanish Basketball Federation) Luis Casimiro

=== Barça Lassa vs. Valencia Basket ===
14 February 2019	Barça Lassa	86–79	Valencia Basket	Madrid
21:30	Scoring by quarter: 13–21, 24–18, 21–19, 28–21
	Pts: Heurtel 17; Rebs: Tomić 8 Asts: Heurtel 4 PIR: Tomić 21	Boxscore	Pts: Dubljević 13; Rebs: Dubljević 5 Asts: Vives 7 PIR: Tobey 15	Arena: WiZink Center; Attendance: 11,511; Referees: José Antonio Martín Bertrán, Daniel Hierrezuelo, Fernando Calatrava

Starters:			Pts	Reb	Ast
G	3	(Canada) Kevin Pangos	6	2	2
C	6	(United States) Chris Singleton	11	7	1
F	9	(Slovenia) Jaka Blažič	2	0	1
F	30	(Spain) Víctor Claver	5	1	0
C	44	(Croatia) Ante Tomić	14	8	1
Reserves:					
C	1	(France) Kevin Séraphin	0	0	0
G	5	(Spain) Pau Ribas	15	0	3
F	8	(Hungary) Ádám Hanga	12	4	2
F	10	(Latvia) Rolands Šmits	DNP		
G	13	(France) Thomas Heurtel	17	2	4
F	18	(Spain) Pierre Oriola	4	2	0
G	24	(Slovakia) Kyle Kuric	DNP		
Head coach:
(Basketball Federation of Serbia) Svetislav Pešić

Barça Lassa	Valencia Basket

Barça	Statistics	Valencia
22/36 (61%)	2 point field goals	14/22 (63%)
10/28 (35%)	3 point field goals	11/31 (35%)
12/13 (92%)	Free throws	18/19 (94%)
27	Rebounds	25
14	Assists	19
9	Steals	5
6	Turnovers	12
1	Blocks	3

Starters:			Pts	Reb	Ast
G	9	(Belgium) Sam Van Rossom	8	2	1
F	10	(United States) Will Thomas	12	1	2
C	14	(Montenegro) Bojan Dubljević	13	5	2
G	16	(Spain) Guillem Vives	2	3	7
F	42	(Canada) Aaron Doornekamp	7	2	3
Reserves:					
F	6	(Spain) Alberto Abalde	0	1	0
F	7	(France) Louis Labeyrie	10	2	0
C	13	(United States) Mike Tobey	11	4	1
G	17	(Spain) Rafa Martínez	DNP		
F	19	(Spain) Fernando San Emeterio	7	1	0
G	21	(United States) Matt Thomas	9	1	3
F	30	(Spain) Joan Sastre	0	0	0
Head coach:
(Spanish Basketball Federation) Jaume Ponsarnau

=== Kirolbet Baskonia vs. Divina Seguros Joventut ===
15 February 2019	Kirolbet Baskonia	89–98	Divina Seguros Joventut	Madrid
19:00	Scoring by quarter: 16–29, 26–16, 26–28, 21–25
	Pts: Janning 18; Rebs: Poirier 8 Asts: Vildoza 4 PIR: Poirier 19	Boxscore	Pts: Laprovíttola 36; Rebs: Todorović 7 Asts: Laprovíttola 7 PIR: Laprovíttola 50	Arena: WiZink Center; Attendance: 12,340; Referees: Benjamín Jiménez Trujillo, Carlos Peruga, Martín Caballero

Starters:			Pts	Reb	Ast
G	3	(Argentina) Luca Vildoza	16	3	4
C	7	(Germany) Johannes Voigtmann	6	3	1
G	11	(Georgia (country)) Matt Janning	18	1	0
C	17	(France) Vincent Poirier	15	8	2
F	31	(Denmark) Shavon Shields	4	0	1
Reserves:					
G	5	(Spain) Miguel González	DNP		
G	8	(Lithuania) Tadas Sedekerskis	DNP		
G	9	(Brazil) Marcelo Huertas	8	2	3
C	12	(Spain) Ilimane Diop	0	0	0
F	21	(United States) Jalen Jones	12	6	0
G	32	(United States) Darrun Hilliard	10	5	3
G	47	(Latvia) Artūrs Kurucs	DNP		
Head coach:
(Croatian Basketball Federation) Velimir Perasović

Kirolbet Baskonia	Divina Seguros Joventut

Baskonia	Statistics	Joventut
27/42 (64%)	2 point field goals	25/41 (60%)
8/26 (30%)	3 point field goals	9/17 (52%)
11/12 (91%)	Free throws	21/28 (75%)
29	Rebounds	33
14	Assists	16
6	Steals	8
11	Turnovers	13
3	Blocks	3

Starters:			Pts	Reb	Ast
F	6	(Spain) Xabier López-Arostegui	7	5	1
G	10	(Argentina) Nicolás Laprovíttola	36	4	7
C	11	(Montenegro) Marko Todorović	15	7	4
G	14	(Spain) Albert Ventura	15	4	0
C	81	(United States) Luke Harangody	0	4	1
Reserves:					
G	0	(North Macedonia) Nenad Dimitrijević	6	0	2
F	4	(Canada) Conor Morgan	10	1	1
C	12	(Argentina) Marcos Delía	4	3	0
F	13	(Spain) José Ignacio Nogués	1	0	0
G	31	(United States) Dakota Mathias	4	1	0
F	44	(Spain) Joel Parra	0	0	0
Head coach:
(Spanish Basketball Federation) Carles Duran

=== Real Madrid vs. Movistar Estudiantes ===
15 February 2019	Real Madrid	94–63	Movistar Estudiantes	Madrid
21:30	Scoring by quarter: 29–27, 21–7, 23–14, 21–15
	Pts: Ayón, Deck 16; Rebs: Tavares 14; Asts: Campazzo 8 PIR: Ayón 27	Boxscore	Pts: Arteaga 12; Rebs: Arteaga 5 Asts: Brizuela, Cook 4 PIR: Cook 14	Arena: WiZink Center; Attendance: 13,280; Referees: Miguel Ángel Pérez Pérez, Antonio Conde, Rafael Serrano

Starters:			Pts	Reb	Ast
F	3	(Slovenia) Anthony Randolph	10	4	2
G	7	(Argentina) Facundo Campazzo	7	6	8
C	14	(Mexico) Gustavo Ayón	16	9	3
G	20	(Azerbaijan) Jaycee Carroll	11	3	0
F	24	(Argentina) Gabriel Deck	16	3	2
Reserves:					
G	1	(France) Fabien Causeur	5	1	0
F	5	(Spain) Rudy Fernández	8	3	1
F	9	(Spain) Felipe Reyes	2	4	0
C	22	(Cape Verde) Edy Tavares	7	14	0
G	23	(Spain) Sergio Llull	5	1	2
G	25	(Slovenia) Klemen Prepelič	2	0	2
F	44	(Sweden) Jeffery Taylor	5	1	1
Head coach:
(Spanish Basketball Federation) Pablo Laso

Real Madrid	Movistar Estudiantes

Madrid	Statistics	Estudiantes
22/44 (50%)	2 point field goals	17/39 (43%)
13/27 (48%)	3 point field goals	9/27 (33%)
11/14 (78%)	Free throws	2/4 (50%)
48	Rebounds	27
21	Assists	13
7	Steals	4
10	Turnovers	12
3	Blocks	3

Starters:			Pts	Reb	Ast
G	5	(Italy) Alessandro Gentile	8	2	1
G	8	(Spain) Darío Brizuela	9	1	4
G	10	(Montenegro) Omar Cook	9	1	4
F	22	(Azerbaijan) Nik Caner-Medley	6	4	0
C	77	(Spain) Víctor Arteaga	12	5	0
Reserves:					
G	00	(Spain) Adams Sola	0	1	0
G	3	(Puerto Rico) Gian Clavell	10	2	1
G	6	(Sweden) Ludvig Håkanson	5	2	3
F	9	(Spain) Édgar Vicedo	0	1	0
F	12	(Croatia) Goran Suton	2	0	0
F	32	(North Macedonia) Shayne Whittington	2	3	0
F	37	(Greece) Fotios Lampropoulos	0	3	0
Head coach:
(Spanish Basketball Federation) Josep Maria Berrocal

== Semifinals ==
=== Barça Lassa vs. Iberostar Tenerife ===
16 February 2019	Barça Lassa	92–86	Iberostar Tenerife	Madrid
19:00	Scoring by quarter: 17–15, 24–14, 31–23, 20–34
	Pts: Ribas 14; Rebs: Séraphin, Tomić 4 Asts: Heurtel, Pangos 3 PIR: Ribas 16	Boxscore	Pts: Abromaitis 24; Rebs: Iverson 8 Asts: Beirán 4 PIR: Abromaitis 28	Arena: WiZink Center; Attendance: 13,150; Referees: Emilio Pérez Pizarro, Antonio Conde, Carlos Peruga

Starters:			Pts	Reb	Ast
G	5	(Spain) Pau Ribas	14	1	1
C	6	(United States) Chris Singleton	2	1	0
G	13	(France) Thomas Heurtel	11	2	3
F	30	(Spain) Víctor Claver	7	2	0
C	44	(Croatia) Ante Tomić	4	4	1
Reserves:					
C	1	(France) Kevin Séraphin	10	4	0
G	3	(Canada) Kevin Pangos	12	1	3
F	8	(Hungary) Ádám Hanga	11	3	0
F	9	(Slovenia) Jaka Blažič	DNP		
F	10	(Latvia) Rolands Šmits	DNP		
F	18	(Spain) Pierre Oriola	9	3	1
G	24	(Slovakia) Kyle Kuric	12	3	0
Head coach:
(Basketball Federation of Serbia) Svetislav Pešić

Barça Lassa	Iberostar Tenerife

Barça	Statistics	Tenerife
24/35 (68%)	2 point field goals	20/32 (62%)
8/22 (36%)	3 point field goals	11/30 (36%)
20/27 (74%)	Free throws	13/15 (86%)
27	Rebounds	30
9	Assists	17
8	Steals	3
10	Turnovers	16
4	Blocks	1

Starters:			Pts	Reb	Ast
G	00	(Spain) Rodrigo San Miguel	6	1	2
C	4	(United States) Colton Iverson	13	8	2
F	21	(United States) Tim Abromaitis	24	5	1
F	33	(Spain) Javier Beirán	2	4	4
G	34	(United States) Davin White	3	1	1
Reserves:					
G	1	(Germany) Lucca Staiger	6	1	0
G	5	(Argentina) Nicolás Richotti	3	0	1
C	7	(Senegal) Mamadou Niang	0	1	0
F	9	(Argentina) Nicolás Brussino	3	3	3
G	10	(Spain) Ferrán Bassas	13	0	3
F	11	(Spain) Sebas Saiz	8	3	0
F	31	(Belgium) Pierre-Antoine Gillet	5	0	0
Head coach:
(Spanish Basketball Federation) Txus Vidorreta

=== Real Madrid vs. Divina Seguros Joventut ===
16 February 2019	Real Madrid	93–81	Divina Seguros Joventut	Madrid
21:30	Scoring by quarter: 26–18, 22–20, 23–14, 22–29
	Pts: Ayón, Campazzo 16; Rebs: Ayón 9 Asts: Fernández, Llull 3 PIR: Ayón 23	Boxscore	Pts: Morgan 20; Rebs: Harangody 6 Asts: Laprovíttola 7 PIR: Morgan 21	Arena: WiZink Center; Attendance: 13,310; Referees: Daniel Hierrezuelo, Benjamín Jiménez Trujillo, Fernando Calatrava

Starters:			Pts	Reb	Ast
G	1	(France) Fabien Causeur	2	0	1
F	3	(Slovenia) Anthony Randolph	15	8	1
G	7	(Argentina) Facundo Campazzo	16	4	1
C	14	(Mexico) Gustavo Ayón	16	9	2
F	24	(Argentina) Gabriel Deck	11	4	2
Reserves:					
F	5	(Spain) Rudy Fernández	3	4	3
F	9	(Spain) Felipe Reyes	5	3	0
G	20	(Azerbaijan) Jaycee Carroll	5	0	1
C	22	(Cape Verde) Edy Tavares	4	5	0
G	23	(Spain) Sergio Llull	8	0	3
G	25	(Slovenia) Klemen Prepelič	DNP		
F	44	(Sweden) Jeffery Taylor	8	0	2
Head coach:
(Spanish Basketball Federation) Pablo Laso

Real Madrid	Divina Seguros Joventut

Madrid	Statistics	Joventut
20/31 (64%)	2 point field goals	17/36 (47%)
12/42 (28%)	3 point field goals	13/27 (48%)
17/21 (80%)	Free throws	8/13 (61%)
44	Rebounds	31
16	Assists	17
8	Steals	8
11	Turnovers	14
2	Blocks	2

Starters:			Pts	Reb	Ast
F	6	(Spain) Xabier López-Arostegui	4	2	0
G	10	(Argentina) Nicolás Laprovíttola	14	3	7
C	11	(Montenegro) Marko Todorović	14	5	2
G	14	(Spain) Albert Ventura	12	2	2
C	81	(United States) Luke Harangody	13	6	0
Reserves:					
G	0	(North Macedonia) Nenad Dimitrijević	4	1	6
F	4	(Canada) Conor Morgan	20	5	0
C	12	(Argentina) Marcos Delía	0	3	0
F	13	(Spain) José Ignacio Nogués	0	2	0
G	31	(United States) Dakota Mathias	0	0	0
F	44	(Spain) Joel Parra	DNP		
Head coach:
(Spanish Basketball Federation) Carles Duran

== Final ==
After wasting a 15-point difference in the last quarter, Real Madrid's Sergio Llull took the game to the overtime with a two-pointer with only three seconds left.

In the extra time and with ten seconds left, a hard contact of Anthony Randolph to Chris Singleton was not sanctioned with a foul and in the next play, Jaycee Carroll scored a 2+1 for allowing Real to take the lead. In the last play, Randolph blocked the shot of Ante Tomić but the referees sanctioned a goaltending despite watching it in the instant replay.

After the match, Real Madrid threatened to leave the ACB.

17 February 2019	Real Madrid	93–94(OT)	Barça Lassa	Madrid
19:30	Scoring by quarter: 16–20, 19–15, 25–11, 17–31, Overtime: 16–17
	Pts: Campazzo 19; Rebs: Ayón 8 Asts: Ayón, Campazzo 5 PIR: Ayón 21	Boxscore	Pts: Heurtel 22; Rebs: Singleton 9 Asts: Heurtel 6 PIR: Heurtel 22	Arena: WiZink Center; Attendance: 13,468; Referees: Juan Carlos García González, Miguel Ángel Pérez Pérez, Benjamín Jiménez Trujillo

Starters:			Pts	Reb	Ast
G	1	(France) Fabien Causeur	14	2	1
F	3	(Slovenia) Anthony Randolph	16	7	1
G	7	(Argentina) Facundo Campazzo	19	4	5
C	14	(Mexico) Gustavo Ayón	12	8	5
F	24	(Argentina) Gabriel Deck	2	2	0
Reserves:					
F	5	(Spain) Rudy Fernández	5	1	0
F	9	(Spain) Felipe Reyes	2	0	0
G	20	(Azerbaijan) Jaycee Carroll	5	2	0
C	22	(Cape Verde) Edy Tavares	2	2	1
G	23	(Spain) Sergio Llull	13	3	1
G	25	(Slovenia) Klemen Prepelič	DNP		
F	44	(Sweden) Jeffery Taylor	3	2	1
Head coach:
(Spanish Basketball Federation) Pablo Laso

Real Madrid	Barça Lassa

Madrid	Statistics	Barça
22/39 (56%)	2 point field goals	22/43 (51%)
12/36 (33%)	3 point field goals	10/21 (47%)
13/18 (72%)	Free throws	20/24 (83%)
35	Rebounds	40
15	Assists	16
5	Steals	3
10	Turnovers	12
4	Blocks	5

Starters:			Pts	Reb	Ast
G	3	(Canada) Kevin Pangos	10	1	3
G	5	(Spain) Pau Ribas	2	1	0
C	6	(United States) Chris Singleton	4	9	2
F	30	(Spain) Víctor Claver	15	7	2
C	44	(Croatia) Ante Tomić	14	7	2
Reserves:					
C	1	(France) Kevin Séraphin	6	1	0
F	8	(Hungary) Ádám Hanga	2	3	1
F	9	(Slovenia) Jaka Blažič	DNP		
F	10	(Latvia) Rolands Šmits	DNP		
G	13	(France) Thomas Heurtel	22	3	6
F	18	(Spain) Pierre Oriola	7	2	0
G	24	(Slovakia) Kyle Kuric	12	1	0
Head coach:
(Basketball Federation of Serbia) Svetislav Pešić

2019 Copa del Rey champions
Barça Lassa
25th title
