= Ádám Hanga =

Hungarian basketball player

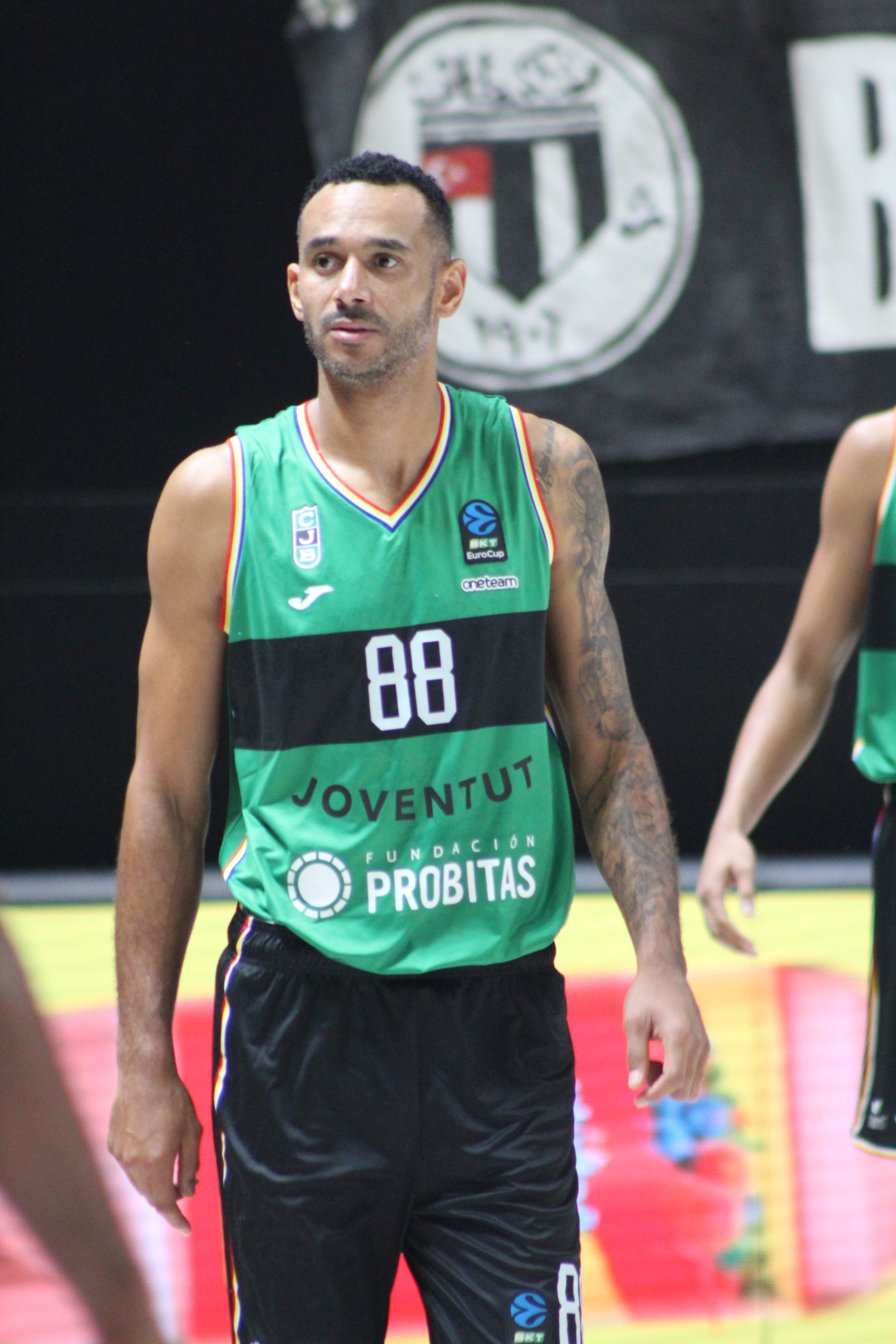
- Hanga with Joventut Badalona in 2024

Free agent
- Position: Small forward

Personal information
- Born: 12 April 1989 (age 37) Budapest, Hungary
- Listed height: 2.00 m (6 ft 7 in)
- Listed weight: 95 kg (209 lb)

Career information
- NBA draft: 2011: 2nd round, 59th overall pick
- Drafted by: San Antonio Spurs
- Playing career: 2006–present

Career history
- 2006–2011: Albacomp
- 2011–2013: Manresa
- 2013–2017: Baskonia
- 2014–2015: → Sidigas Avellino
- 2017–2021: FC Barcelona
- 2021–2023: Real Madrid
- 2023–2024: Crvena zvezda
- 2024–2026: Joventut Badalona

Career highlights
- EuroLeague champion (2023); EuroLeague Best Defender (2017); 2× Liga ACB champion (2021, 2022); 3× Spanish Cup winner (2018, 2019, 2021); 2x Spanish Supercup winner (2021, 2022); All-Liga ACB First Team (2017); 2× All-Liga ACB Second Team (2016, 2020); ABA League champion (2024); Central European League winner (2009); Hungarian League Best Defender (2011); Hungarian League Domestic Player of the Year (2011); All-Hungarian League Second Team (2011); 2× Hungarian All-Star (2009, 2011)
- Stats at Basketball Reference

Ádám Hanga (born 12 April 1989) is a Hungarian professional basketball player who last played for Joventut Badalona of the Spanish Liga ACB. He was drafted 59th overall by the San Antonio Spurs in the 2011 NBA draft. Hanga won the EuroLeague Best Defender award in 2017.

== Early life ==
Hanga was born to a Hungarian mother and an Equatoguinean father, who was studying in Hungary at that time. His father left the family when Ádám was 3 years old and he was brought up by his mother and maternal grandparents.

He is the nephew of African-Russian journalist and television personality Yelena Khanga.

== Professional career ==
Hanga began his career with the Hungarian club, Albacomp, in 2006, at the age of 17, and stayed with the Székesfehérvár-based club until 2011. In June 2009, he was invited to the Adidas Eurocamp, an event that is held annually in Treviso, for top-flight players, aged between 18 and 21. After three days of training and scrimmages, he was ranked the sixth best non-U.S. player in his age group. The 2010–11 season turned out to be his breakout year, as he dominated the Hungarian League.

In May 2011, he moved to the Spanish League, signing with Bàsquet Manresa. The San Antonio Spurs selected Hanga with the 59th pick in the 2011 NBA draft.

In July 2013, Hanga signed a four-year deal with the Spanish club Baskonia. In August 2014, he was loaned to the Italian League team Sidigas Avellino, for the 2014–15 season. Hanga came back to Baskonia Vitoria-Gasteiz on 11 May 2015 for the final games of the 2014–15 ACB season, after finishing the Lega Basket season with Avellino. On 28 June 2017 Hanga was registered by Baskonia for the right of first refusal. On 9 July 2017 Hanga signed an offer sheet with FC Barcelona Lassa. On 12 July 2017 Baskonia matched the offer sheet to Hanga, keeping Hanga in their roster. On 23 July 2017 Hanga re-signed with Baskonia, through the 2019–20 season.

On 22 August 2017 Baskonia and FC Barcelona reached an agreement for the transfer of Hanga to the Catalan club. On 9 July 2019 Barcelona Bàsquet announced Hanga had extended his contract with the club until 2022, with an option to continue through 2023. On 16 July 2021 Hanga parted ways with the club after four seasons together.

On 23 July 2021 Hanga signed a two-year deal with Liga ACB archrivals Real Madrid. On 24 June 2023 Real Madrid informed the player that they would not pick up his contract option and he would become a free agent.

On 12 July 2023 Hanga signed a two-year contract with Crvena zvezda.

On July 4, 2024, he signed with Joventut Badalona of the Spanish Liga ACB.

== Career statistics ==
Legend
GP	Games played	GS	Games started	MPG	Minutes per game
FG%	Field-goal percentage	3P%	3-point field-goal percentage	FT%	Free-throw percentage
RPG	Rebounds per game	APG	Assists per game	SPG	Steals per game
BPG	Blocks per game	PPG	Points per game	PIR	Performance index rating
**Bold**	Career high

=== EuroLeague ===
†	Denotes season in which Hanga won the EuroLeague
*	Led the league

Year	Team	GP	GS	MPG	FG%	3P%	FT%	RPG	APG	SPG	BPG	PPG	PIR
2013–14	Baskonia	15	0	17.0	.449	.286	.560	2.1	1.1	.7	.5	5.6	5.3
2015–16	Baskonia	27	27	**29.0**	.452	.279	.707	**5.1**	1.7	**1.4**	**1.2**	8.2	**13.1**
2016–17	Baskonia	33	**30**	28.0	.449	.336	.667	4.4	2.4	1.3	.7	**10.5**	13.0
2017–18	Barcelona	26	25	24.7	.453	.347	.679	3.7	2.0	.7	.7	8.7	9.1
2018–19	Barcelona	27	13	20.9	**.464**	.282	.745	4.0	1.9	1.1	.3	8.8	10.6
2019–20	Barcelona	28*	25	20.3	.444	.276	.750	2.9	**3.4**	.7	.2	5.8	7.9
2020–21	Barcelona	**41***	7	15.9	.421	.343	.647	2.2	1.7	.8	.3	4.6	4.8
2021–22	Real Madrid	31	26	18.8	.428	.296	**.773**	3.1	1.7	.6	.4	5.8	6.6
2022–23†	Real Madrid	27	16	13.4	.376	**.362**	.724	1.8	1.7	.6	.2	4.2	4.1
2023–24	Crvena zvezda	26	10	20.1	.399	.333	.533	2.9	2.4	1.0	.3	8.0	8.2
Career		281	179	20.8	.436	.318	.678	3.2	2.0	.9	.5	7.0	8.3

=== Domestic leagues ===
Year	Team	League	GP	MPG	FG%	3P%	FT%	RPG	APG	SPG	BPG	PPG
2006–07	(Hungary) Albacomp	NB I/A	8	5.4	.545	.750	.429	.6	.3	.6	.1	2.3
2007–08	(Hungary) Albacomp	NB I/A	16	13.3	.462	.150	.640	1.7	1.3	1.4	.6	4.2
2008–09	(Hungary) Albacomp	NB I/A	26	26.5	.576	.333	.654	3.4	2.7	1.8	.8	10.3
2009–10	(Hungary) Albacomp	NB I/A	25	31.6	.529	.288	.678	4.1	2.0	1.9	.8	13.9
2010–11	(Hungary) Albacomp	NB I/A	39	33.3	.494	.328	.655	4.4	3.4	2.8	.7	17.6
2011–12	(Spain) Manresa	ACB	34	21.4	.397	.268	.667	2.9	1.9	1.4	.7	7.8
2012–13	(Spain) Manresa	ACB	32	26.0	.418	.353	.703	4.5	2.3	1.3	.8	11.7
2013–14	(Spain) Baskonia	ACB	26	17.4	.513	.333	.500	2.4	1.0	1.0	.6	5.8
2014–15	(Italy) Felice Scandone	LBA	30	28.6	.395	.265	.712	4.3	2.7	1.9	.8	10.6
2014–15	(Spain) Baskonia	ACB	4	13.3	.444	.000	—	3.0	1.7	.7	.2	2.0
2015–16	(Spain) Baskonia	ACB	40	26.5	.505	.283	.726	4.3	1.5	1.5	.8	9.4
2016–17	(Spain) Baskonia	ACB	37	28.0	.489	.338	.750	4.2	2.4	1.4	.6	11.8
2017–18	(Spain) Barcelona	ACB	37	22.3	.478	.312	.675	3.3	1.6	1.2	.5	8.6
2018–19	(Spain) Barcelona	ACB	35	22.1	.478	.350	.711	3.9	1.5	1.1	.5	9.9
2019–20	(Spain) Barcelona	ACB	27	21.1	.455	.293	.727	3.7	4.0	.9	.4	7.0
2020–21	(Spain) Barcelona	ACB	41	15.7	.546	.507	.702	3.2	1.9	.7	.4	5.5
2021–22	(Spain) Real Madrid	ACB	37	20.1	.449	.359	.739	3.1	1.7	.8	.4	8.5
2022–23	(Spain) Real Madrid	ACB	28	14.6	.482	.333	.600	1.9	1.3	.6	.2	5.0
2023–24	(Serbia) Crvena zvezda	ABA	20	17.3	.433	.388	.593	2.2	2.6	.9	.1	6.3
