= Thomas Heurtel =

French basketball player (born 1989)

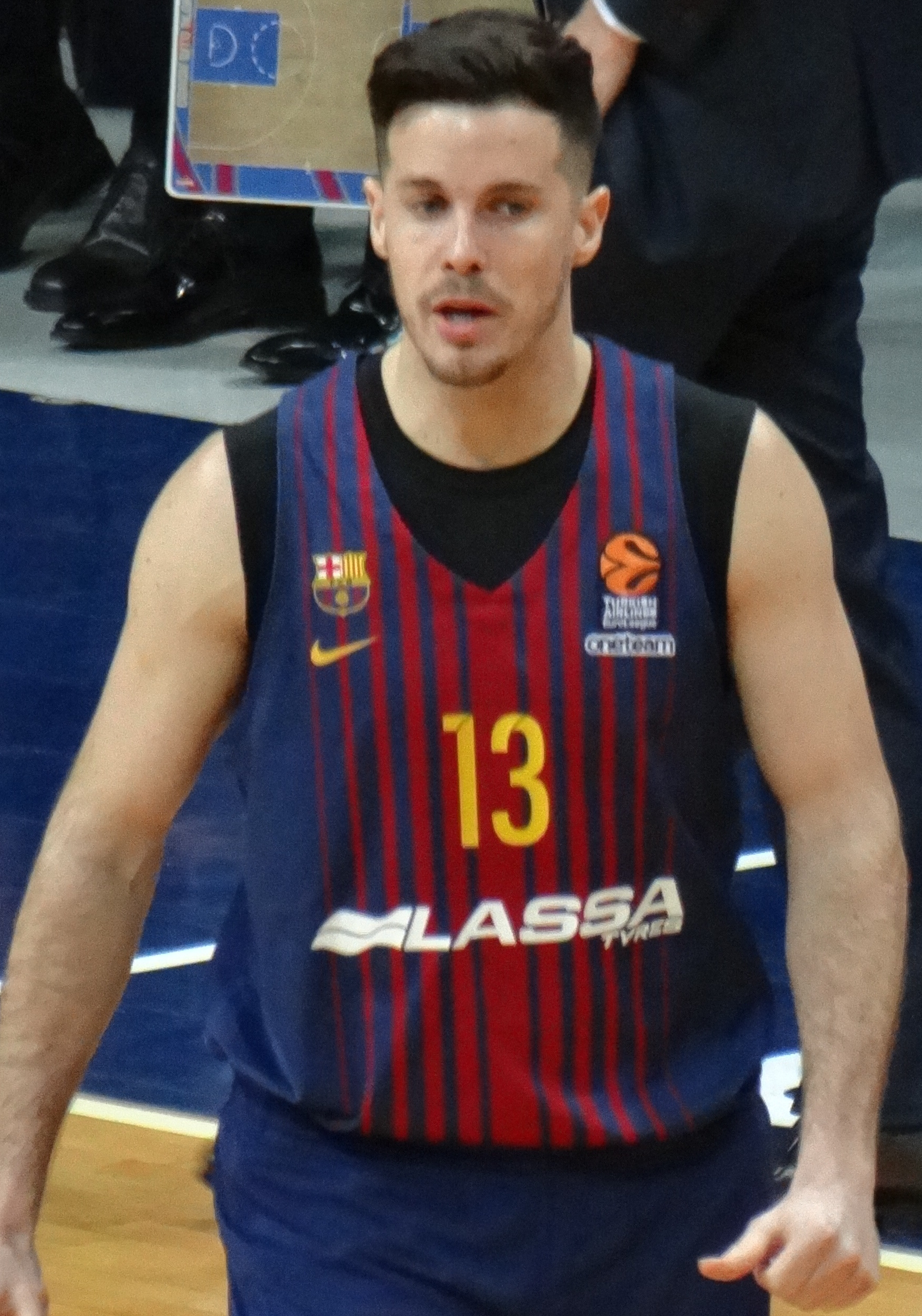
- Heurtel with Barcelona in 2018

No. 77 – AEK Athens
- Position: Point guard
- League: Greek Basketball League

Personal information
- Born: 10 April 1989 (age 37) Béziers, France
- Listed height: 1.89 m (6 ft 2 in)
- Listed weight: 82 kg (181 lb)

Career information
- NBA draft: 2010: undrafted
- Playing career: 2007–present

Career history
- 2007–2009: Pau-Orthez
- 2009–2011: ASVEL
- 2009–2010: →SIG Strasbourg
- 2010–2011: →Lucentum Alicante
- 2011–2014: Baskonia
- 2014–2017: Anadolu Efes
- 2017–2021: FC Barcelona
- 2021: ASVEL
- 2021–2022: Real Madrid
- 2022–2024: Zenit Saint Petersburg
- 2024: Shenzhen Leopards
- 2025: Básquet Coruña
- 2025–2026: ASVEL
- 2026–present: AEK Athens

Career highlights
- EuroLeague assists leader (2016); Liga ACB champion (2022); LNB Pro A champion (2021); 2× Spanish Cup winner (2018, 2019); Turkish Cup winner (2015); 2× VTB United League Supercup winner (2022, 2023); Spanish Supercup winner (2021); Turkish Supercup winner (2015); All-LNB Pro A Team (2021); All-VTB United League First Team (2023); 2× All-Liga ACB Second Team (2018, 2019); Turkish Super League assists leader (2016); 2× Spanish Cup MVP (2018, 2019); Turkish Cup Final MVP (2015); VTB United League Newcomer of The Year (2023); LNB Pro A Best Young Player (2009)
Medals
Representing France
Men's basketball
Summer Olympics
Silver medal – second place	2020 Tokyo	Team
FIBA World Cup
Bronze medal – third place	2014 Spain
EuroBasket
Gold medal – first place	2013 Slovenia
Silver medal – second place	2022 Czech Republic–Georgia–Italy–Germany
European U-20 Championship
Silver medal – second place	2009 Greece

Thomas David Heurtel (French pronunciation: [tɔmɑ œʁtɛl]; born 10 April 1989) is a French professional basketball player for AEK Athens of the Greek Basketball League. Standing at 1.89 m (6 ft 2 1/2 in), he plays at the point guard position.

== Professional career ==
=== France (2007–2010) ===
Heurtel rose through the ranks at the French club Élan Béarnais Pau-Orthez, and he played in the senior men's first team of the club for two seasons. In the 2008–09 season, he won the French League's Rising Star Award.

One year later, after the relegation of Pau-Orthez, he signed with the French club ASVEL Basket, but he played on loan with French club Strasbourg IG.

=== Spain (2010–2014) ===
In the summer of 2010, Heurtel left France, to join the Spanish League club Meridiano Alicante.

In 2011, Heurtel signed with Spanish club Baskonia, and with them he debuted in the top-tier level European-wide league, the EuroLeague.

=== Turkey (2014–2017) ===
On 27 December 2014, just before the start of the Top 16 stage of the 2014–15 Euroleague season, Anadolu Efes bought him to Baskonia and Heurtel signed a contract until June 2017 with Turkish club Anadolu Efes, of the Turkish Basketball Super League (BSL). With Efes, Heurtel needed just two months to win his first club title, as he helped his team to win the Turkish Cup title. Additionally, Heurtel was named the Turkish Cup Final MVP. At the beginning of the next season, Heurtel helped Anadolu Efes to beat Pınar Karşıyaka to win the Turkish President´s Cup, his second title with Efes.

In the 2016–17 season, Heurtel was named the EuroLeague MVP of the Month, for the first time in his career, after averaging 16.7 points and 10.7 assists in the month of February.

=== Return to Spain (2017–2021) ===
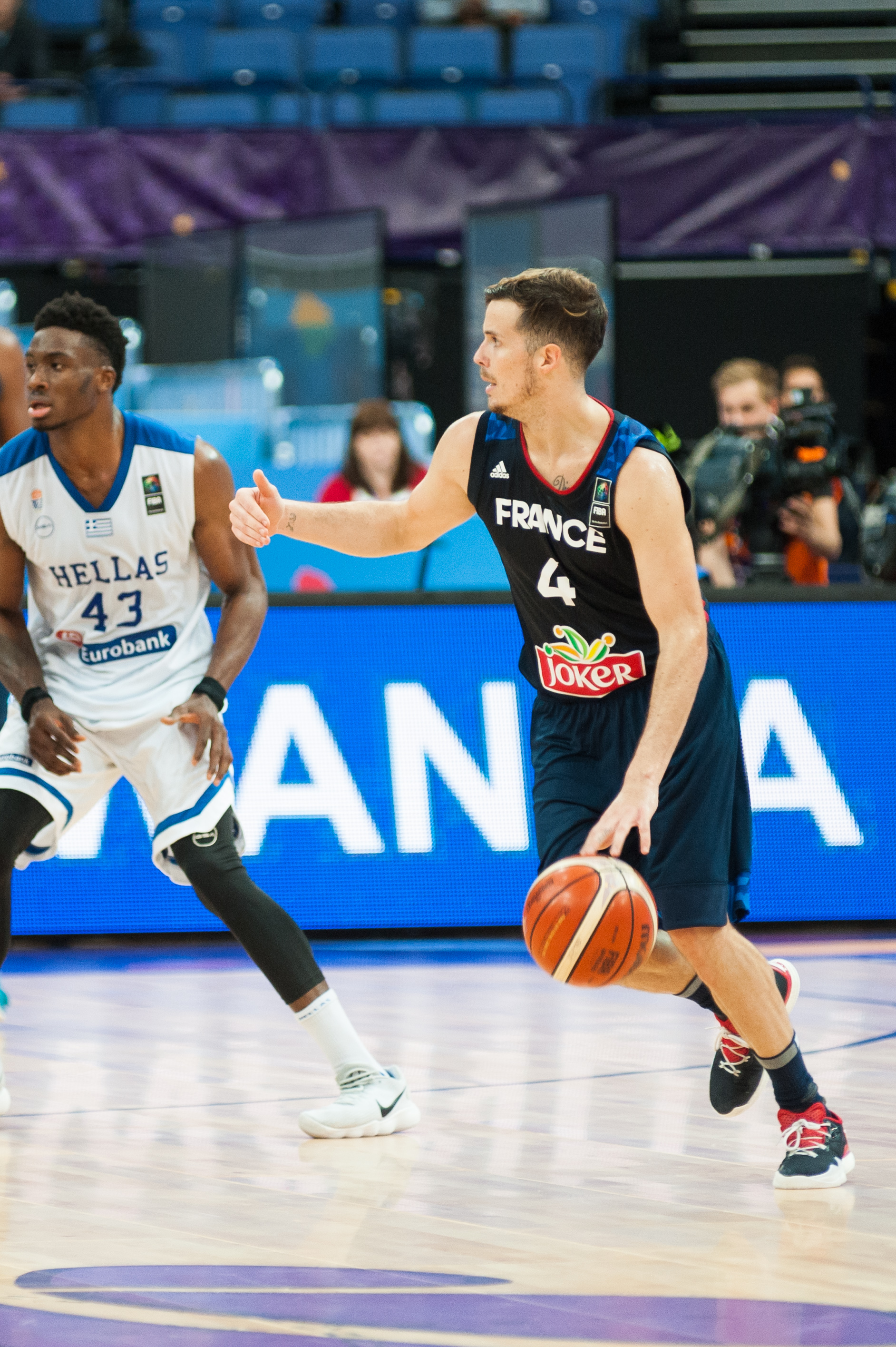
Thomas Heurtel with France at the EuroBasket 2017 tournament

On 22 June 2017 Heurtel signed a two-year deal with FC Barcelona Lassa of the Liga ACB. On 18 February 2018 Heurtel won the Copa del Rey with FC Barcelona Lassa and was named MVP of the tournament.

On July 5, 2019, Heurtel resigned with FC Barcelona for two more years, with an option to extend it until the end of the 2021–22 campaign.

Heurtel would leave Barcelona surrounded by controversy in 2021, after an incident during the team's trip to Istanbul for a Euroleague game in December 2020. The player was not allowed to travel back to Barcelona with the team and was left at Istanbul airport by the FC Barcelona delegation after it was discovered he was allegedly negotiating with rivals Real Madrid behind the club's back. Heurtel wouldn't play a game again for the rest of his stint at Barcelona, training with the reserve team.

=== Return to France (2021) ===
On February 24, 2021, Heurtel signed with ASVEL of the French LNB Pro A for the rest of the season.

=== Second return to Spain (2021–2022) ===
On July 6, 2021, Heurtel signed a one-year deal with Real Madrid of the Liga ACB and the EuroLeague. He was sidelined in the latter stretch of the season due to disciplinary reasons. On June 29, 2022, Heurtel officially parted ways with the Spanish club.

=== Zenit Saint Petersburg (2022–2024) ===
On September 21, 2022, Heurtel signed with Zenit Saint Petersburg. On August 7, 2024, he parted ways with the club.

=== Shenzhen Leopards (2024) ===
In September 2024, Heurtel signed to Shenzhen Leopards of the Chinese Basketball Association.

=== Básquet Coruña (2025) ===
In January 2025, Heurtel would return to Spain surrounded by controversy again. While initial reports linked him with a return to FC Barcelona, the Catalans would cancel the transfer after the outcry the news generated among fans. On January 3, Heurtel had already landed in Barcelona airport with his family, attending journalists and expressing his wishes to reconcile with Barcelona fans, when news broke that the transfer was cancelled. Heurtel would later hold a press conference with his agent, in which he expressed he felt "disrespected and deceived" by the FC Barcelona board.

Heurtel would later end up signing with Leyma Coruña of the Liga ACB, where he was announced as a new player on January 10, 2025.

=== AEK Athens (2026) ===
On September 18, 2026, he joined AEK Athens of the Greek Basketball League.

== National team career ==
Heurtel played with the French under-20 national team at the 2008 FIBA Europe Under-20 Championship, and at the 2009 FIBA Europe Under-20 Championship, where he won a silver medal. He has also been a member of the senior men's French national basketball team. With France, he played at the EuroBasket 2013, where he won a gold medal, at the 2014 FIBA Basketball World Cup, where he won a bronze medal, and at the 2016 Summer Olympics.

After Heurtel broke his agreement not to play for any Russian or Belarusian team in order to represent France at EuroBasket 2022—by joining a Russian team in 2022—in November 2022 French basketball federation president Jean-Pierre Siutat said: "he will no longer be there (in the France national team). It’s over."

== Career statistics ==
Legend
GP	Games played	GS	Games started	MPG	Minutes per game
FG%	Field-goal percentage	3P%	3-point field-goal percentage	FT%	Free-throw percentage
RPG	Rebounds per game	APG	Assists per game	SPG	Steals per game
BPG	Blocks per game	PPG	Points per game	PIR	Performance index rating
**Bold**	Career high

=== EuroLeague ===
*	Led the league

Year	Team	GP	GS	MPG	FG%	3P%	FT%	RPG	APG	SPG	BPG	PPG	PIR
2011–12	Baskonia	10	4	11.4	.389	.235	.500	.8	1.0	.1	—	3.3	1.7
2012–13	Baskonia	28	20	20.4	.484	.437	.690	2.1	4.5	.7	—	7.2	9.1
2013–14	Baskonia	21	19	25.8	.429	.235	.786	2.1	5.3	.7	—	8.0	9.8
2014–15	Baskonia	10	6	**28.3**	**.532**	**.563**	.786	2.8	6.7	**.9**	—	12.2	16.2
2014–15	Anadolu Efes	18	9	24.0	.418	.393	.826	2.4	6.2	.6	**.1**	9.4	10.8
2015–16	Anadolu Efes	24	15	27.4	.498	.427	.803	**2.9**	**7.9***	.8	—	**12.7**	**17.3**
2016–17	Anadolu Efes	**35**	6	26.3	.456	.337	.867	1.7	5.6	.8	—	**12.7**	12.5
2017–18	Barcelona	30	**22**	23.6	.500	.348	.814	2.4	6.4	.7	—	11.3	13.9
2018–19	Barcelona	35	19	21.1	.477	.450	.753	1.9	4.8	.7	—	10.4	11.1
2019–20	Barcelona	3	0	13.3	.385	.400	**1.000**	2.3	4.7	.3	—	5.3	7.3
2020–21	Barcelona	12	0	13.5	.289	.211	.833	1.2	2.4	.4	—	2.9	1.9
2021–22	Real Madrid	27	14	19.3	.421	.400	.857	2.4	4.6	.6	—	9.0	9.7
Career		253	134	22.5	.461	.382	.805	2.1	5.3	.7	.0	9.6	11.1
