= 2017–18 FC Barcelona Bàsquet season =

Spanish basketball club season

FC Barcelona Lassa
2017–18 season
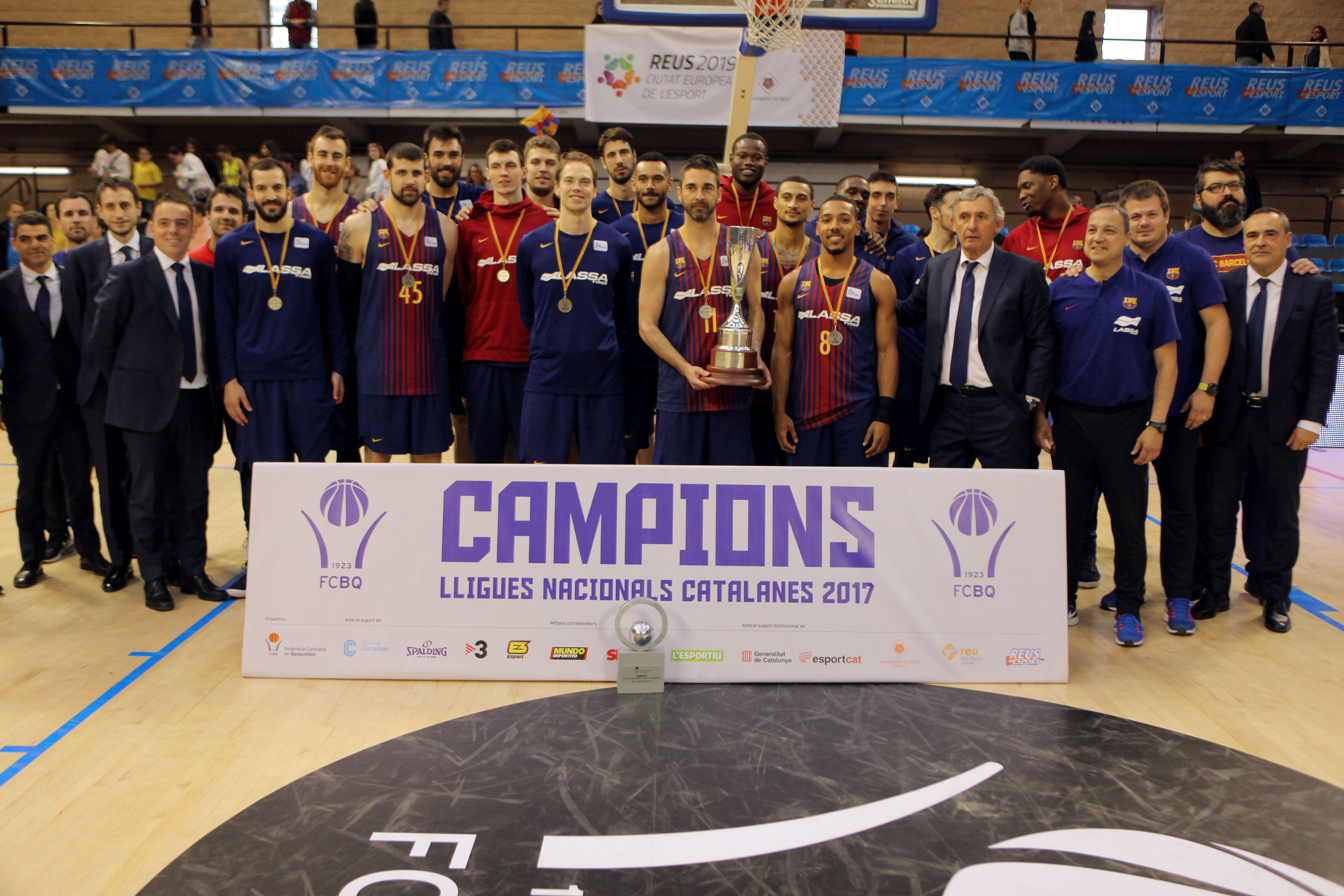
- Barcelona roster in May 2018
- President: Josep Maria Bartomeu
- Head coach: Sito Alonso (August–February); Svetislav Pešić (February–June)
- Arena: Palau Blaugrana
- Liga ACB: 3rd
- Playoffs: Semifinals
- EuroLeague: 13th
- Copa del Rey: Winners
- Highest home attendance: 6,829 vs Real Madrid (23 February 2018)
- Average home attendance: 5,679 (in EuroLeague); 4,790 (in Liga ACB)
- Biggest win: 121–56 vs Real Betis Energía Plus (11 April 2018)
- Biggest defeat: 74–101 vs Real Madrid (23 February 2018)
Home	Away
- All statistics correct as of 22 September 2025.

The 2017–18 season was FC Barcelona's 92nd in existence, their 35th consecutive season in the top flight of Spanish basketball and 18th consecutive season in the EuroLeague.

In the 2017–18 season, FC Barcelona competed in the Liga ACB, the Copa del Rey and the EuroLeague.

== Players ==
=== Roster ===
Note: Flags indicate national team eligibility at FIBA-sanctioned events. Players may hold other non-FIBA nationalities not displayed.

FC Barcelona Lassa roster
Players
Coaches

Pos.	No.	Nat.	Name	Ht.	Wt.	Age
PF/C	1	(France)	Séraphin, Kevin	2.08 m (6 ft 10 in)	126 kg (278 lb)	28 – 7 December 1989
C	2	(United States)	Reynolds, Jalen	2.08 m (6 ft 10 in)	113 kg (249 lb)	25 – 30 December 1992
SG	5	(Spain)	Ribas, Pau	1.96 m (6 ft 5 in)	95 kg (209 lb)	31 – 2 March 1987
SG	6	(Spain)	García, Marc	1.98 m (6 ft 6 in)	82 kg (181 lb)	22 – 7 March 1996
PG	8	(United States)	Pressey, Phil	1.80 m (5 ft 11 in)	80 kg (176 lb)	27 – 17 February 1991
SF	9	(Hungary)	Hanga, Ádám	2.00 m (6 ft 7 in)	95 kg (209 lb)	29 – 12 April 1989
SG	10	(France)	Jackson, Edwin	1.91 m (6 ft 3 in)	91 kg (201 lb)	28 – 18 September 1989
SG	11	(Spain)	Navarro, Juan Carlos (C)	1.92 m (6 ft 4 in)	90.5 kg (200 lb)	37 – 13 June 1980
PG	13	(France)	Heurtel, Thomas	1.89 m (6 ft 2 in)	82 kg (181 lb)	29 – 10 April 1989
F	14	(Bulgaria)	Vezenkov, Sasha	2.06 m (6 ft 9 in)	102 kg (225 lb)	22 – 6 August 1995
PF/C	18	(Spain)	Oriola, Pierre	2.08 m (6 ft 10 in)	107 kg (236 lb)	25 – 25 September 1992
G/F	21	(United States)	Sanders, Rakim	1.96 m (6 ft 5 in)	106 kg (234 lb)	28 – 8 July 1989
G	25	(Finland)	Koponen, Petteri	1.94 m (6 ft 4 in)	88 kg (194 lb)	30 – 13 April 1988
F	30	(Spain)	Claver, Víctor	2.06 m (6 ft 9 in)	102 kg (225 lb)	29 – 30 August 1988
C	44	(Croatia)	Tomić, Ante	2.18 m (7 ft 2 in)	120 kg (265 lb)	31 – 17 February 1987
PF	45	(France)	Moerman, Adrien	2.02 m (6 ft 8 in)	108 kg (238 lb)	29 – 7 August 1988

Head coach

- (Serbia) Svetislav Pešić

Assistant coach(es)

- (Spain) Ricard Casas
- (Spain) David García
- (Spain) Óscar Orellana

Legend

- (C) Team captain
- Injured

- Roster
Updated: 18-9-2025

=== Depth chart ===
Pos.	Starting 5	Bench 1	Bench 2
C	Ante Tomić	Kevin Séraphin	Jalen Reynolds *
PF	Adrien Moerman	Pierre Oriola †	Sasha Vezenkov
SF	Ádám Hanga	Víctor Claver †	Rakim Sanders *
SG	Pau Ribas †	Juan Carlos Navarro †	Edwin Jackson
PG	Thomas Heurtel	Petteri Koponen	Phil Pressey *

Notes: Blue † – homegrown player; (Note: A homegrown player is a player that played for at least three years before the age of 20 on a Spanish team. In Liga ACB, the team must register at least four homegrown players in rosters of 10–12 players or at least three homegrown players in rosters of 8–9 players. In EuroLeague, the team did not have any limitations regarding the number of homegrown players.) Red * – overseas player; (Note: An overseas player is a player from outside EEA, FIBA Europe or ACP states. In Liga ACB, the team may register at most two overseas players. In EuroLeague, the team did not have any limitations regarding the number of overseas players.) Green ‡ – youth player (Note: In Liga ACB, the team may register under-22 players linked to the youth system. In EuroLeague, the team may register under-20 players linked to the youth system.)

=== On loan ===
Players out on loan
Nat.	Player	Position	Team	On loan since
(Serbia)	Stefan Peno	PG	(Germany) Alba Berlin	August 2017–June 2018
(Senegal)	Moussa Diagne	C	(Spain) MoraBanc Andorra	August 2017–June 2018

=== Roster changes ===
==== In ====
No.	Pos.	Nat.	Name	Moving from		Type	Date	Source
13	PG	(France)	Thomas Heurtel	Anadolu Efes	(Turkey)	End of contract	22 Jun 2017	
45	PF	(France)	Adrien Moerman	Darüşşafaka	(Turkey)	End of contract	12 Jul 2017	
18	PF/C	(Spain)	Pierre Oriola	Valencia Basket	(Spain)	Contract buyout	14 Jul 2017	
8	PG	(United States)	Phil Pressey	Santa Cruz Warriors	(United States)	End of contract	27 Jul 2017	
21	G/F	(United States)	Rakim Sanders	Olimpia Milano	(Italy)	End of contract	30 Jul 2017	
1	C	(France)	Kevin Séraphin	Indiana Pacers	(United States)	Waived	4 Aug 2017	
9	SF	(Hungary)	Ádám Hanga	Baskonia	(Spain)	Transfer fee	14 Sep 2017	
10	SG	(France)	Edwin Jackson	Guangdong Southern Tigers	(China)	Parted ways	29 Jan 2018	
2	C	(United States)	Jalen Reynolds	Pallacanestro Reggiana	(Italy)	End of contract	15 May 2018	

==== Out ====
No.	Pos.	Nat.	Name	Moving to		Type	Date	Source
1	PG	(United States)	Xavier Munford	Wisconsin Herd	(United States)	End of contract	8 Jun 2017	
32	CG	(Bosnia and Herzegovina)	Alex Renfroe	Galatasaray	(Turkey)	End of contract	8 Jun 2017	
33	SF	(Greece)	Stratos Perperoglou	Hapoel Jerusalem	(Israel)	End of contract	13 Jun 2017	
24	SG	(United States)	Brad Oleson	UCAM Murcia	(Spain)	End of contract	13 Jun 2017	
5	PF	(Kosovo)	Justin Doellman	Anadolu Efes	(Turkey)	End of contract	16 Jun 2017	
20	G/F	(Sweden)	Marcus Eriksson	Gran Canaria	(Spain)	Parted ways	30 Jun 2017	
2	PG	(Montenegro)	Tyrese Rice	Shenzhen Leopards	(China)	Parted ways	15 Jan 2018	

== Pre-season and friendlies ==
=== Friendly matches ===
1 September 2017	Cafés Candelas Breogán	61–78	FC Barcelona Lassa	Lugo
20:30	Scoring by quarter: 21–13, 15–29, 15–20, 10–16
	Pts: Stainbrook 12	Boxscore	Pts: García 16	Arena: Pazo dos Deportes; Attendance: 2,000; Referees: Pérez, Cortés, Rial

3 September 2017 II Memorial Quino Salvo	Monbús Obradoiro	82–98	FC Barcelona Lassa	Vigo
12:15	Scoring by quarter: 22–20, 17–34, 27–17, 16–27
	Pts: Navarro 14	Report	Pts: Vezenkov 18	Arena: Complejo deportivo de As Travesas; Attendance: 3,800; Referees: Pérez, Cortés, Rial

8 September 2017 Appart City Cup	Valencia Basket	63–69	FC Barcelona Lassa	Rezé
17:30	Scoring by quarter: 11–17, 16–17, 13–14, 23–21
	Pts: Thomas 14	Report	Pts: Pressey, Tomić 12	Arena: Salle de la Trocardière; Referees: Bissang, Bouvert, Ceccarelli

9 September 2017 Appart City Cup	Nanterre 92	83–77	FC Barcelona Lassa	Rezé
17:30	Scoring by quarter: 30–7, 19–19, 14–28, 20–23
	Pts: Aminu 22	Report	Pts: Pressey 16	Arena: Salle de la Trocardière

15 September 2017	San Lorenzo de Almagro	95–85	FC Barcelona Lassa	Balaguer
17:30	Scoring by quarter: 31–19, 25–20, 19–23, 20–23
	Pts: Deck 23	Report	Pts: Moerman 21	Arena: Pavelló Municipal de Balaguer; Referees: Perea, Oyón, Mas

17 September 2017	FC Barcelona Lassa	82–62	Iberostar Tenerife	Monzón
12:30	Scoring by quarter: 22–16, 26–16, 18–14, 16–16
	Pts: Heurtel 15	Report	Pts: Tobey 15

24 September 2017	FC Barcelona Lassa	72–70	UCAM Murcia	Platja d'Aro
12:30	Scoring by quarter: 19–14, 12–18, 16–19, 25–19
	Pts: Moerman 12	Report	Pts: Tumba 12	Arena: Palau d'Esports i Congressos

=== Lliga Catalana de Bàsquet ===
1 May 2018 Final	FC Barcelona Lassa (Catalonia)	89–70	(Andorran Basketball Federation) MoraBanc Andorra	Reus
12:30	Scoring by quarter: 27–13, 23–22, 17–18, 22–17
	Pts: Navarro 15; Rebs: Oriola 6 Asts: Heurtel 7 PIR: Tomić 15	Boxscore	Pts: Shurna 19; Rebs: Iverson 5 Asts: Albicy, Fernández 2 PIR: Shurna 18	Arena: Pavelló Olímpic de Reus; Attendance: 2,000; Referees: Josep Antoni Martín Bertrán, Òscar Perea Lorente, Jordi Aliaga Solé
Note: Originally scheduled for September 2017, the game was delayed due to the 2017 Catalan independence referendum

== Competitions ==
=== Overview ===
Competition	First match	Last match	Starting round	Final position	Record							
Competition	First match	Last match	Starting round	Final position	Pld	W	D	L	PF	PA	PD	Win %
Liga ACB	29 September 2017	10 June 2018	Round 1	Semifinals	41	27		14	3,571	3,261	+310	65.85
EuroLeague	13 October 2017	5 April 2018	Round 1	13th	30	11		19	2,456	2,404	+52	36.67
Copa del Rey	16 February 2018	18 February 2018	Quarter-finals	Winners	3	3		0	273	254	+19	100.00
Total					74	41	0	33	6,300	5,919	+381	55.41

Last updated: 17 June 2025
Source: Competitions

=== Liga ACB ===
==== League table ====
Pos	Team	Pld	W	L	PF	PA	PD	Qualification or relegation
1	Real Madrid	34	30	4	3052	2678	+374	Qualification to playoffs
2	Kirolbet Baskonia	34	25	9	2946	2668	+278	Qualification to playoffs
3	FC Barcelona Lassa	34	24	10	3030	2691	+339	Qualification to playoffs
4	Valencia Basket	34	22	12	2809	2582	+227	Qualification to playoffs
5	Herbalife Gran Canaria	34	20	14	2851	2780	+71	Qualification to playoffs

Source: ACB

==== Results summary ====
Overall						Home					Away				
Pld	W	L	PF	PA	PD	W	L	PF	PA	PD	W	L	PF	PA	PD
34	24	10	3030	2691	+339	12	5	1589	1316	+273	12	5	1441	1375	+66

Source: Competitive matches

==== Results by round ====
Round	1	2	3	4	5	6	7	8	9	10	11	12	13	14	15	16	17	18	19	20	21	22	23	24	25	26	27	28	29	30	31	32	33	34
Ground	H	A	H	H	A	H	A	A	H	A	H	H	A	H	A	H	A	H	A	H	A	H	A	A	H	A	H	A	H	A	H	A	A	H
Result	W	W	W	W	L	L	W	W	W	W	L	L	W	W	W	L	L	W	L	W	W	W	W	W	L	W	W	L	W	W	W	L	W	W
Position	9	7	2	1	3	4	3	3	2	2	2	4	3	2	2	2	3	2	3	4	2	2	2	3	3	3	3	3	2	3	3	3	3	3

Source: Competitive matches
A = Away; H = Home; W = Win; L = Loss; R = Rest

==== Matches ====
29 September 2017 1	FC Barcelona Lassa	87–82	Kirolbet Baskonia	Barcelona
21:00	Scoring by quarter: 24–26, 21–16, 11–25, 31–15
	Pts: Heurtel 23; Rebs: Vezenkov 7 Asts: Heurtel 9 PIR: Heurtel 29	Boxscore	Pts: Huertas 19; Rebs: Diop, Voigtmann 8 Asts: Granger 7 PIR: Huertas 22	Arena: Palau Blaugrana; Attendance: 5,562; Referees: Miguel Ángel Pérez Pérez, Fernando Calatrava, Jacobo Rial

5 October 2017 2	Divina Seguros Joventut	72–74	FC Barcelona Lassa	Badalona
21:30	Scoring by quarter: 20–26, 17–11, 13–17, 22–20
	Pts: Kulvietis 16; Rebs: Richard 7 Asts: Kulvietis 4 PIR: Kulvietis 16	Boxscore	Pts: Séraphin 14; Rebs: Séraphin, Vezenkov 5 Asts: Heurtel 6 PIR: Hanga 13	Arena: Pavelló Olímpic de Badalona; Attendance: 4,307; Referees: José Antonio Martín Bertrán, Francisco Araña, Arnau Padrós

8 October 2017 3	FC Barcelona Lassa	111–81	San Pablo Burgos	Barcelona
12:30	Scoring by quarter: 29–18, 27–23, 28–26, 27–14
	Pts: Ribas 21; Rebs: Moerman, Oriola 6 Asts: Heurtel 10; PIR: Oriola 26	Boxscore	Pts: Fisher, Huskić 13; Rebs: Sedekerskis, Thompson 4 Asts: Fisher 5 PIR: López 19	Arena: Palau Blaugrana; Attendance: 3,581; Referees: Emilio Pérez Pizarro, Jordi Aliaga, Alfonso Olivares

15 October 2017 4	FC Barcelona Lassa	102–58	Monbus Obradoiro	Barcelona
19:00	Scoring by quarter: 20–15, 29–7, 29–17, 24–19
	Pts: Oriola 19; Rebs: Tomić 6 Asts: Pressey 6 PIR: Tomić 23	Boxscore	Pts: Thomas 19; Rebs: Pecháček, Pustovyi 6 Asts: Pozas 5 PIR: Thomas 21	Arena: Palau Blaugrana; Attendance: 4,315; Referees: Carlos Peruga, Jorge Martínez, Raúl Zamorano

22 October 2017 5	Movistar Estudiantes	80–70	FC Barcelona Lassa	Madrid
12:30	Scoring by quarter: 16–11, 20–34, 19–16, 25–9
	Pts: Landesberg 27; Rebs: Arteaga 8 Asts: Cook 6 PIR: Landesberg 26	Boxscore	Pts: Heurtel 17; Rebs: Moerman 8 Asts: Heurtel 6 PIR: Heurtel 16	Arena: WiZink Center; Attendance: 9,099; Referees: Daniel Hierrezuelo, Sergio Manuel, Carlos Sánchez Monserrat

29 October 2017 6	FC Barcelona Lassa	94–97	UCAM Murcia	Barcelona
12:30	Scoring by quarter: 21–23, 27–27, 19–25, 27–22
	Pts: Heurtel 28; Rebs: Vezenkov 8 Asts: Heurtel 6 PIR: Heurtel 30	Boxscore	Pts: Benite 19; Rebs: Tumba 9 Asts: Kloof 4 PIR: Urtasun 22	Arena: Palau Blaugrana; Attendance: 4,719; Referees: Benjamín Jiménez, Luis Miguel Castillo, Antonio Sacristán

5 November 2017 7	RETAbet Bilbao Basket	83–104	FC Barcelona Lassa	Bilbao
18:00	Scoring by quarter: 15–29, 21–26, 24–24, 23–25
	Pts: Redivo 18; Rebs: Mumbrú, Todorović 5 Asts: Fischer, Tabu 4 PIR: Mumbrú 18	Boxscore	Pts: Hanga 15; Rebs: Tomić 8 Asts: Heurtel 10; PIR: Heurtel 23	Arena: Bilbao Arena; Attendance: 8,976; Referees: Antonio Conde, Jacobo Rial, Victor Mas

12 November 2017 8	Real Madrid	80–84	FC Barcelona Lassa	Madrid
18:30	Scoring by quarter: 19–18, 26–27, 16–16, 19–23
	Pts: Dončić 20; Rebs: Dončić, Reyes 10; Asts: Campazzo 3 PIR: Dončić, Reyes 19	Boxscore	Pts: Moerman 19; Rebs: Tomić 6 Asts: Heurtel 4 PIR: Moerman 22	Arena: WiZink Center; Attendance: 12,114; Referees: Emilio Pérez Pizarro, Óscar Perea, Martín Caballero

19 November 2017 9	FC Barcelona Lassa	79–74	Valencia Basket	Barcelona
18:30	Scoring by quarter: 13–16, 24–13, 21–23, 21–22
	Pts: Séraphin 19; Rebs: Heurtel 5 Asts: Heurtel 5 PIR: Séraphin 18	Boxscore	Pts: Green 24; Rebs: Pleiss 10; Asts: Vives 5 PIR: Green 27	Arena: Palau Blaugrana; Attendance: 5,420; Referees: Juan Carlos García González, Jorge Martínez, Andrés Fernández Sánchez

3 December 2017 10	Tecnyconta Zaragoza	86–99	FC Barcelona Lassa	Zaragoza
18:00	Scoring by quarter: 19–21, 21–23, 16–29, 30–26
	Pts: Neal 23; Rebs: Varnado 9 Asts: Alocén, Bellas 4 PIR: Neal 22	Boxscore	Pts: Navarro 15; Rebs: Moerman 7 Asts: three players 5 PIR: Navarro 21	Arena: Pabellón Príncipe Felipe; Attendance: 9,321; Referees: Antonio Conde, Juan de Dios Oyón, Javier Torres

10 December 2017 11	FC Barcelona Lassa	91–93(OT)	Iberostar Tenerife	Barcelona
19:00	Scoring by quarter: 17–25, 19–13, 24–20, 17–19, Overtime: 14–19
	Pts: Navarro 22; Rebs: Moerman 8 Asts: Ribas 4 PIR: Navarro 22	Boxscore	Pts: Ponitka 22; Rebs: Ponitka 10; Asts: five players 2 PIR: Ponitka 36	Arena: Palau Blaugrana; Attendance: 4,019; Referees: Carlos Cortés, Fernando Calatrava, Alberto Sánchez Sixto

17 December 2017 12	FC Barcelona Lassa	77–88	Herbalife Gran Canaria	Barcelona
12:30	Scoring by quarter: 21–23, 16–21, 20–24, 20–20
	Pts: Heurtel 24; Rebs: Séraphin 8 Asts: Heurtel 6 PIR: Heurtel 25	Boxscore	Pts: Balvín 17; Rebs: Báez 8 Asts: three players 3 PIR: Báez, Balvín 20	Arena: Palau Blaugrana; Attendance: 3,974; Referees: Daniel Hierrezuelo, Vicente Bultó, Pedro Munar

2 January 2018 13	Delteco GBC	77–101	FC Barcelona Lassa	San Sebastián
18:30	Scoring by quarter: 21–24, 20–31, 23–23, 13–23
	Pts: Chery 14; Rebs: Chery 6 Asts: Chery 3 PIR: Chery 20	Boxscore	Pts: Koponen 21; Rebs: Koponen 7 Asts: Heurtel 10; PIR: Koponen 24	Arena: Donostia Arena; Attendance: 4,109; Referees: Emilio Pérez Pizarro, Jacobo Rial, Arnau Padrós

31 December 2017 14	FC Barcelona Lassa	101–74	Montakit Fuenlabrada	Barcelona
12:30	Scoring by quarter: 20–16, 26–20, 25–13, 30–25
	Pts: Heurtel 15; Rebs: Moerman 6 Asts: Heurtel 7 PIR: Heurtel, Séraphin 19	Boxscore	Pts: Cruz 17; Rebs: four players 5 Asts: Popović 3 PIR: Popović 19	Arena: Palau Blaugrana; Attendance: 4,297; Referees: Carlos Peruga, Rafael Serrano, Javier Torres

7 January 2018 15	Real Betis Energía Plus	82–89	FC Barcelona Lassa	Seville
12:30	Scoring by quarter: 21–19, 10–21, 18–22, 33–27
	Pts: Anosike 22; Rebs: Anosike 6 Asts: Schilb 8 PIR: Anosike 28	Boxscore	Pts: Vezenkov 17; Rebs: Moerman 7 Asts: Heurtel 8 PIR: Vezenkov 20	Arena: Palacio Municipal de Deportes San Pablo; Attendance: 5,800; Referees: José Antonio Martín Bertrán, José Ramón García Ortiz, Martín Caballero

14 January 2018 16	FC Barcelona Lassa	73–76	Unicaja	Barcelona
18:30	Scoring by quarter: 7–14, 20–32, 15–17, 31–13
	Pts: Oriola 17; Rebs: Hanga, Tomić 7 Asts: Hanga, Heurtel 6 PIR: Oriola 17	Boxscore	Pts: Suárez 14; Rebs: Shermadini 9 Asts: Díaz, Suárez 4 PIR: Suárez 24	Arena: Palau Blaugrana; Attendance: 4,957; Referees: Miguel Ángel Pérez Pérez, Fernando Calatrava, Alberto Sánchez Sixto

21 January 2018 17	MoraBanc Andorra	102–92	FC Barcelona Lassa	Andorra la Vella
18:30	Scoring by quarter: 33–14, 12–25, 34–18, 23–35
	Pts: Blažič 20; Rebs: Janković, Shurna 5 Asts: Fernández 6 PIR: Sané 22	Boxscore	Pts: Heurtel 19; Rebs: Oriola 8 Asts: Heurtel 8 PIR: Oriola 21	Arena: Poliesportiu d'Andorra; Attendance: 4,854; Referees: Carlos Cortés, Jordi Aliaga, Alfonso Olivares

28 January 2018 18	FC Barcelona Lassa	91–79	Divina Seguros Joventut	Barcelona
12:30	Scoring by quarter: 13–9, 27–20, 25–24, 26–26
	Pts: Sanders 16; Rebs: Moerman, Tomić 8 Asts: Ribas 9 PIR: Hanga, Ribas 20	Boxscore	Pts: Laprovíttola 20; Rebs: Jordan 5 Asts: Laprovíttola 4 PIR: Laprovíttola 15	Arena: Palau Blaugrana; Attendance: 5,892; Referees: Óscar Perea, Sergio Manuel, Rubén Sánchez Mohedas

4 February 2018 19	Kirolbet Baskonia	96–72	FC Barcelona Lassa	Vitoria-Gasteiz
18:30	Scoring by quarter: 31–7, 27–23, 17–21, 21–20
	Pts: Beaubois 24; Rebs: Voigtmann 10; Asts: Voigtmann 7 PIR: Beaubois 29	Boxscore	Pts: Oriola 18; Rebs: Oriola 11; Asts: Heurtel 6 PIR: Oriola 22	Arena: Fernando Buesa Arena; Attendance: 11,251; Referees: Benjamín Jiménez, Vicente Bultó, Jorge Martínez

11 February 2018 20	FC Barcelona Lassa	90–58	RETAbet Bilbao Basket	Barcelona
12:30	Scoring by quarter: 23–14, 12–13, 27–10, 28–21
	Pts: four players 12; Rebs: Tomić 9 Asts: Heurtel 8 PIR: Tomić 20	Boxscore	Pts: Hammink 12; Rebs: Mumbrú 8 Asts: five players 2 PIR: Hammink 13	Arena: Palau Blaugrana; Attendance: 5,567; Referees: Antonio Conde, Luis Miguel Castillo, Andrés Fernández Sánchez

3 March 2018 21	UCAM Murcia	55–61	FC Barcelona Lassa	Murcia
19:00	Scoring by quarter: 13–15, 9–11, 16–16, 17–19
	Pts: Rojas 14; Rebs: Rojas 8 Asts: Hannah, Oleson 3 PIR: Rojas 19	Boxscore	Pts: Ribas, Tomić 13; Rebs: Claver 7 Asts: Heurtel 4 PIR: Tomić 20	Arena: Palacio de Deportes de Murcia; Attendance: 5,911; Referees: Juan Carlos García González, Rafael Serrano, Raúl Zamorano

11 March 2018 22	FC Barcelona Lassa	94–72	Real Madrid	Barcelona
18:30	Scoring by quarter: 21–14, 24–15, 27–17, 22–26
	Pts: Heurtel 21; Rebs: Moerman 7 Asts: Claver, Ribas 5 PIR: Heurtel 22	Boxscore	Pts: Fernández 11; Rebs: Randolph 6 Asts: Randle 4 PIR: Fernández 14	Arena: Palau Blaugrana; Attendance: 5,687; Referees: Benjamín Jiménez, Sergio Manuel, Jacobo Rial

18 March 2018 23	San Pablo Burgos	101–103(OT)	FC Barcelona Lassa	Burgos
18:30	Scoring by quarter: 15–20, 35–19, 20–24, 19–26, Overtime: 12–14
	Pts: Saiz, Vega 18; Rebs: Thompson 11; Asts: five players 3 PIR: Saiz 27	Boxscore	Pts: Heurtel 26; Rebs: Tomić 8 Asts: Heurtel 13; PIR: Heurtel 37	Arena: Coliseum Burgos; Attendance: 8,985; Referees: Daniel Hierrezuelo, Luis Miguel Castillo, Esperanza Mendoza

25 March 2018 24	Monbus Obradoiro	73–76	FC Barcelona Lassa	Santiago de Compostela
18:00	Scoring by quarter: 21–12, 10–22, 26–25, 16–17
	Pts: Thomas 22; Rebs: Bendžius, Pustovyi 6 Asts: Llovet, Pozas 4 PIR: Bendžius 25	Boxscore	Pts: Tomić 20; Rebs: Claver 6 Asts: Heurtel 11; PIR: Tomić 35	Arena: Fontes do Sar; Attendance: 5,495; Referees: Antonio Conde, Jorge Martínez, Rubén Sánchez Mohedas

1 April 2018 25	FC Barcelona Lassa	95–100	Movistar Estudiantes	Barcelona
12:30	Scoring by quarter: 18–28, 25–21, 25–26, 27–25
	Pts: Koponen 19; Rebs: Claver 9 Asts: Heurtel 7 PIR: Heurtel, Koponen 19	Boxscore	Pts: Landesberg 48; Rebs: Brizuela 7 Asts: Cook 6 PIR: Landesberg 52	Arena: Palau Blaugrana; Attendance: 3,834; Referees: Óscar Perea, José Ramón García Ortiz, Javier Torres

8 April 2018 26	Herbalife Gran Canaria	77–93	FC Barcelona Lassa	Las Palmas
18:30	Scoring by quarter: 18–21, 20–16, 20–30, 19–26
	Pts: Radičević 20; Rebs: Brussino, Paulí 4 Asts: Oliver 6 PIR: Radičević 26	Boxscore	Pts: Koponen 23; Rebs: Moerman 7 Asts: Heurtel 10; PIR: Koponen 30	Arena: Gran Canaria Arena; Attendance: 6,941; Referees: Carlos Peruga, Jordi Aliaga, Antonio Sacristán

11 April 2018 27	FC Barcelona Lassa	121–56	Real Betis Energía Plus	Barcelona
20:00	Scoring by quarter: 33–8, 24–18, 33–15, 31–15
	Pts: Hanga 15; Rebs: Oriola 13; Asts: Ribas 6 PIR: Oriola 28	Boxscore	Pts: Anosike, Kelly 11; Rebs: Anosike, Kelly 5 Asts: Anosike 3 PIR: Anosike 16	Arena: Palau Blaugrana; Attendance: 3,053; Referees: Benjamín Jiménez, Fernando Calatrava, Esperanza Mendoza

15 April 2018 28	Unicaja	80–78	FC Barcelona Lassa	Málaga
18:30	Scoring by quarter: 17–16, 26–10, 12–29, 25–23
	Pts: Salin 16; Rebs: Suárez 9 Asts: Suárez 8 PIR: Suárez 24	Boxscore	Pts: Koponen, Tomić 14; Rebs: Tomić 7 Asts: Heurtel 10; PIR: Heurtel 24	Arena: Martín Carpena; Attendance: 8,115; Referees: Juan Carlos García González, Luis Miguel Castillo, Alberto Sánchez Sixto

22 April 2018 29	FC Barcelona Lassa	89–74	Delteco GBC	Barcelona
12:30	Scoring by quarter: 24–19, 22–16, 22–21, 21–18
	Pts: Oriola 14; Rebs: Tomić, Vezenkov 5 Asts: Heurtel 7 PIR: Oriola 20	Boxscore	Pts: Chery 19; Rebs: three players 5 Asts: Pérez 6 PIR: Chery 17	Arena: Palau Blaugrana; Attendance: 4,873; Referees: Carlos Cortés, Andrés Fernández Sánchez, Pedro Munar

28 April 2018 30	Montakit Fuenlabrada	75–93	FC Barcelona Lassa	Fuenlabrada
19:00	Scoring by quarter: 25–22, 16–18, 8–26, 26–27
	Pts: Šmits 22; Rebs: O'Leary, Šmits 6 Asts: Cruz 4 PIR: Šmits 19	Boxscore	Pts: Tomić 20; Rebs: Tomić 10; Asts: Ribas 6 PIR: Tomić 31	Arena: Polideportivo Fernando Martín; Attendance: 4,716; Referees: Miguel Ángel Pérez Pérez, Jordi Aliaga, Javier Torres

5 May 2018 31	FC Barcelona Lassa	94–70	MoraBanc Andorra	Barcelona
19:00	Scoring by quarter: 31–12, 16–20, 25–16, 22–22
	Pts: Tomić 16; Rebs: Moerman 11; Asts: Ribas 8 PIR: Tomić 31	Boxscore	Pts: Blažič 13; Rebs: Iverson 5 Asts: Albicy 4 PIR: Blažič 12	Arena: Palau Blaugrana; Attendance: 5,068; Referees: José Antonio Martín Bertrán, Rafael Serrano, Jacobo Rial

13 May 2018 32	Iberostar Tenerife	86–81	FC Barcelona Lassa	San Cristóbal de la Laguna
18:30	Scoring by quarter: 21–16, 25–16, 20–27, 20–22
	Pts: Vasileiadis 19; Rebs: Tobey 8 Asts: San Miguel 11; PIR: San Miguel 25	Boxscore	Pts: Heurtel 16; Rebs: three players 4 Asts: Ribas 5 PIR: Heurtel 16	Arena: Santiago Martín; Attendance: 5,044; Referees: Antonio Conde, Vicente Bultó, Martín Caballero

19 May 2018 33	Valencia Basket	70–71	FC Barcelona Lassa	Valencia
21:15	Scoring by quarter: 21–14, 15–20, 16–13, 18–24
	Pts: Abalde, Thomas 11; Rebs: Dubljević 9 Asts: Thomas 4 PIR: Dubljević 16	Boxscore	Pts: Heurtel 15; Rebs: Moerman 8 Asts: Ribas 4 PIR: Heurtel 20	Arena: Pavelló Municipal Font de Sant Lluís; Attendance: 7,830; Referees: Miguel Ángel Pérez Pérez, Óscar Perea, Raúl Zamorano

24 May 2018 34	FC Barcelona Lassa	100–84	Tecnyconta Zaragoza	Barcelona
20:30	Scoring by quarter: 31–20, 23–24, 22–16, 24–24
	Pts: Moerman 18; Rebs: Moerman 12; Asts: Heurtel, Ribas 6 PIR: Heurtel 28	Boxscore	Pts: Ennis 19; Rebs: Bjelica 8 Asts: Ennis 5 PIR: Ennis 23	Arena: Palau Blaugrana; Attendance: 3,583; Referees: Carlos Cortés, Francisco Araña, Alfonso Olivares

=== ACB Playoffs ===
==== Quarterfinals ====
27 May 2018 1	FC Barcelona Lassa	76–94	MoraBanc Andorra	Barcelona
20:45	Scoring by quarter: 22–27, 18–18, 17–21, 19–28
	Pts: Koponen 17; Rebs: Moerman 11; Asts: Heurtel 4 PIR: Tomić 21	Boxscore	Pts: Blažič 14; Rebs: Iverson 5 Asts: Albicy, Janković 6 PIR: Fernández 15	Arena: Palau Blaugrana; Attendance: 4,011; Referees: Carlos Peruga, Óscar Perea, Raúl Zamorano

30 May 2018 2	MoraBanc Andorra	81–85	FC Barcelona Lassa	Andorra la Vella
19:45	Scoring by quarter: 22–17, 20–25, 21–22, 18–21
	Pts: Albicy 22; Rebs: Blažič 9 Asts: Fernández 5 PIR: Albicy 19	Boxscore	Pts: Tomić 19; Rebs: Tomić 6 Asts: Heurtel, Tomić 4 PIR: Tomić 31	Arena: Poliesportiu d'Andorra; Attendance: 4,774; Referees: Emilio Pérez Pizarro, Fernando Calatrava, Andrés Fernández Sánchez

1 June 2018 3	FC Barcelona Lassa	91–71	MoraBanc Andorra	Barcelona
19:45	Scoring by quarter: 26–16, 19–21, 24–16, 22–19
	Pts: Hanga, Tomić 15; Rebs: Moerman 12; Asts: Heurtel 5 PIR: Claver, Tomić 20	Boxscore	Pts: Blažič 13; Rebs: Diagne, Shurna 5 Asts: Albicy 5 PIR: Diagne 15	Arena: Palau Blaugrana; Attendance: 6,438; Referees: Daniel Hierrezuelo, Juan Carlos García González, Miguel Ángel Pérez Pérez

==== Semifinals ====
4 June 2018 1	Kirolbet Baskonia	86–61	FC Barcelona Lassa	Vitoria-Gasteiz
21:00	Scoring by quarter: 20–15, 27–13, 20–12, 19–21
	Pts: three players 13; Rebs: Voigtmann 9 Asts: Granger 5 PIR: Shengelia, Voigtmann 17	Boxscore	Pts: Koponen 12; Rebs: Reynolds 8 Asts: Heurtel 6 PIR: Reynolds 11	Arena: Fernando Buesa Arena; Attendance: 9,764; Referees: Daniel Hierrezuelo, Benjamín Jiménez, Fernando Calatrava

6 June 2018 2	Kirolbet Baskonia	85–79	FC Barcelona Lassa	Vitoria-Gasteiz
21:00	Scoring by quarter: 18–26, 20–22, 29–17, 18–14
	Pts: Janning 19; Rebs: Poirier, Shengelia 7 Asts: Granger 5 PIR: Janning 20	Boxscore	Pts: Moerman 12; Rebs: Moerman, Tomić 5 Asts: Heurtel 6 PIR: Moerman 21	Arena: Fernando Buesa Arena; Attendance: 9,814; Referees: Miguel Ángel Pérez Pérez, Antonio Conde, Rafael Serrano

8 June 2018 3	FC Barcelona Lassa	67–65	Kirolbet Baskonia	Barcelona
21:00	Scoring by quarter: 18–19, 13–14, 16–12, 20–20
	Pts: Tomić 15; Rebs: Moerman 9 Asts: Hanga 5 PIR: Tomić 26	Boxscore	Pts: Shengelia 11; Rebs: Poirier 12; Asts: Huertas 7 PIR: Huertas, Shengelia 12	Arena: Palau Blaugrana; Attendance: 5,661; Referees: Emilio Pérez Pizarro, Benjamín Jiménez, Carlos Peruga

10 June 2018 4	FC Barcelona Lassa	82–88(OT)	Kirolbet Baskonia	Barcelona
18:30	Scoring by quarter: 16–21, 18–23, 19–15, 23–17, Overtime: 6–12
	Pts: Heurtel 16; Rebs: Tomić 9 Asts: Heurtel 5 PIR: Tomić 27	Boxscore	Pts: Shengelia 22; Rebs: Shengelia, Voigtmann 7 Asts: Huertas 7 PIR: Shengelia 33	Arena: Palau Blaugrana; Attendance: 6,089; Referees: Daniel Hierrezuelo, Miguel Ángel Pérez Pérez, Fernando Calatrava

=== EuroLeague ===
==== League table ====
Pos	Team	Pld	W	L	PF	PA	PD
11	(Spain) Valencia Basket	30	12	18	2336	2420	−84
12	(Germany) Brose Bamberg	30	11	19	2309	2446	−137
13	(Spain) FC Barcelona Lassa	30	11	19	2456	2404	+52
14	(Serbia) Crvena zvezda mts	30	11	19	2333	2515	−182
15	(Italy) AX Armani Exchange Olimpia	30	10	20	2407	2530	−123

Source: EuroLeague
Rules for classification: All points scored in extra period(s) will not be counted in the standings, nor for any tie-break situation.

==== Results summary ====
Overall						Home					Away				
Pld	W	L	PF	PA	PD	W	L	PF	PA	PD	W	L	PF	PA	PD
30	11	19	2456	2404	+52	8	7	1228	1147	+81	3	12	1228	1257	−29

Last updated: 17 July 2025.
Source: Competitive matches

==== Results by round ====
Round	1	2	3	4	5	6	7	8	9	10	11	12	13	14	15	16	17	18	19	20	21	22	23	24	25	26	27	28	29	30
Ground	H	A	H	A	H	H	A	H	H	A	H	A	H	A	A	H	A	A	H	A	H	A	H	A	H	A	A	H	A	H
Result	W	L	L	L	W	L	L	W	W	L	L	L	L	L	W	W	L	L	W	L	L	L	L	L	W	W	L	L	W	W
Position	1	5	9	12	9	12	12	10	10	10	11	12	13	13	13	12	12	13	11	12	13	15	15	15	15	13	15	15	15	13

Source: Competitive matches
A = Away; H = Home; W = Win; L = Loss; P = Postponed

==== Matches ====
13 October 2017 1	FC Barcelona Lassa (Spanish Basketball Federation)	98–71	(Hellenic Basketball Federation) Panathinaikos Superfoods Athens	Barcelona
21:00	Scoring by quarter: 24–20, 16–15, 25–19, 33–17
	Pts: Séraphin 24; Rebs: Moerman 11; Asts: Heurtel 9 PIR: Séraphin 31	Boxscore	Pts: Pappas 20; Rebs: Singleton 5 Asts: Calathes 6 PIR: Pappas 25	Arena: Palau Blaugrana; Attendance: 5,424; Referees: Damir Javor, Emin Mogulkoc, Jakub Zamojski

20 October 2017 2	Crvena zvezda mts (Basketball Federation of Serbia)	90–82	(Spanish Basketball Federation) FC Barcelona Lassa	Belgrade
19:00	Scoring by quarter: 24–13, 20–19, 18–25, 28–25
	Pts: Bjelica 23; Rebs: Antić, Lessort 9 Asts: Rochestie 7 PIR: Rochestie 27	Boxscore	Pts: Séraphin 16; Rebs: Tomić 8 Asts: Heurtel 11; PIR: Heurtel 21	Arena: Aleksandar Nikolić Hall; Attendance: 6,086; Referees: Oļegs Latiševs, Carmelo Paternicò, Piotr Pastusiak

24 October 2017 3	FC Barcelona Lassa (Spanish Basketball Federation)	75–81	(Lithuanian Basketball Federation) Žalgiris	Barcelona
21:00	Scoring by quarter: 21–24, 18–21, 15–17, 21–19
	Pts: Hanga 19; Rebs: Hanga 10; Asts: Koponen 6 PIR: Hanga 24	Boxscore	Pts: Micić 20; Rebs: Jankūnas 7 Asts: Micić 8 PIR: Micić 24	Arena: Palau Blaugrana; Attendance: 5,034; Referees: Luigi Lamonica, Ilija Belošević, Milan Nedović

26 October 2017 4	AX Armani Exchange Olimpia (Italian Basketball Federation)	78–74	(Spanish Basketball Federation) FC Barcelona Lassa	Assago
21:00	Scoring by quarter: 17–22, 22–17, 15–14, 24–21
	Pts: Theodore 19; Rebs: Gudaitis 11; Asts: Theodore 7 PIR: Theodore 24	Boxscore	Pts: Heurtel, Navarro 13; Rebs: Moerman 9 Asts: Heurtel 7 PIR: Heurtel 16	Arena: Mediolanum Forum; Attendance: 7,345; Referees: Saša Pukl, Amit Balak, Siniša Herceg

3 November 2017 5	FC Barcelona Lassa (Spanish Basketball Federation)	73–51	(Hellenic Basketball Federation) Olympiacos	Barcelona
21:00	Scoring by quarter: 14–14, 18–12, 17–15, 24–10
	Pts: Séraphin 13; Rebs: Hanga 6 Asts: Pressey, Heurtel 5 PIR: Oriola 15	Boxscore	Pts: Papapetrou 11; Rebs: Milutinov, Printezis 6 Asts: Papanikolaou 4 PIR: Milutinov 16	Arena: Palau Blaugrana; Attendance: 5,743; Referees: Sreten Radović, Fernando Rocha, Miloš Koljenšić

9 November 2017 6	FC Barcelona Lassa (Spanish Basketball Federation)	85–89	(Turkish Basketball Federation) Anadolu Efes	Barcelona
21:00	Scoring by quarter: 15–26, 20–16, 22–25, 28–22
	Pts: Séraphin 19; Rebs: three players 4 Asts: Heurtel 9 PIR: Claver 15	Boxscore	Pts: Štimac 22; Rebs: Dunston 9 Asts: five players 2 PIR: Štimac 29	Arena: Palau Blaugrana; Attendance: 4,913; Referees: Robert Lottermoser, Borys Ryzhyk, Jurgis Laurinavičius

15 November 2017 7	Brose Bamberg (German Basketball Federation)	84–81	(Spanish Basketball Federation) FC Barcelona Lassa	Nuremberg
20:00	Scoring by quarter: 12–38, 25–21, 25–17, 22–15
	Pts: Wright 16; Rebs: Rubit 9 Asts: Wright 5 PIR: Wright 25	Boxscore	Pts: Sanders 17; Rebs: Sanders, Séraphin 6 Asts: Heurtel 6 PIR: Sanders 26	Arena: Arena Nürnberger Versicherung; Attendance: 8,000; Referees: Luigi Lamonica, Matej Boltauzer, Marcin Kowalski

17 November 2017 8	FC Barcelona Lassa (Spanish Basketball Federation)	89–71	(Spanish Basketball Federation) Valencia Basket	Barcelona
21:00	Scoring by quarter: 24–18, 26–14, 21–24, 18–15
	Pts: Oriola 14; Rebs: Ribas 5 Asts: Hanga, Heurtel 5 PIR: Moerman 17	Boxscore	Pts: Pleiß 13; Rebs: Pleiß 7 Asts: Vives 7 PIR: Vives 15	Arena: Palau Blaugrana; Attendance: 5,089; Referees: Ilija Belošević, Elias Koromilas, Marko Juras

23 November 2017 9	FC Barcelona Lassa (Spanish Basketball Federation)	89–67	(Israeli Basketball Association) Maccabi Tel Aviv	Barcelona
21:00	Scoring by quarter: 22–11, 22–13, 22–20, 23–23
	Pts: Koponen 20; Rebs: Séraphin 11; Asts: Heurtel 7 PIR: Koponen, Sanders 19	Boxscore	Pts: Kane 13; Rebs: Kane, Tyus 7 Asts: Jackson, Roll 4 PIR: Kane 22	Arena: Palau Blaugrana; Attendance: 5,034; Referees: Saša Pukl, Piotr Pastusiak, Spiros Gkontas

1 December 2017 10	CSKA Moscow (Russian Basketball Federation)	92–78	(Spanish Basketball Federation) FC Barcelona Lassa	Moscow
18:00	Scoring by quarter: 24–24, 20–15, 22–19, 26–20
	Pts: Clyburn 22; Rebs: Hines 6 Asts: De Colo 11; PIR: De Colo 30	Boxscore	Pts: Séraphin, Heurtel 11; Rebs: Oriola 7 Asts: Heurtel 5 PIR: Séraphin 15	Arena: Megasport Arena; Attendance: 12,008; Referees: Damir Javor, Emin Moğulkoç, Michele Rossi

8 December 2017 11	FC Barcelona Lassa (Spanish Basketball Federation)	68–83	(Turkish Basketball Federation) Fenerbahçe Doğuş	Barcelona
21:00	Scoring by quarter: 28–22, 10–17, 13–25, 17–19
	Pts: Hanga 15; Rebs: Séraphin 9 Asts: Heurtel 10; PIR: Hanga 18	Boxscore	Pts: Sloukas 17; Rebs: Datome 9 Asts: Sloukas 5 PIR: Sloukas 17	Arena: Palau Blaugrana; Attendance: 6,437; Referees: Robert Lottermoser, Elias Koromilas, Milan Nedović

14 December 2017 12	Real Madrid (Spanish Basketball Federation)	87–75	(Spanish Basketball Federation) FC Barcelona Lassa	Madrid
20:45	Scoring by quarter: 15–15, 25–23, 28–14, 19–23
	Pts: Dončić 16; Rebs: Reyes 8 Asts: Dončić 7 PIR: Dončić 26	Boxscore	Pts: Tomić 12; Rebs: Hanga 7 Asts: Heurtel, Navarro 3 PIR: Tomić 17	Arena: WiZink Center; Attendance: 10,516; Referees: Sreten Radović, Carmelo Paternicò, Sérgio Silva

20 December 2017 13	FC Barcelona Lassa (Spanish Basketball Federation)	83–90	(Spanish Basketball Federation) Unicaja	Barcelona
21:00	Scoring by quarter: 24–26, 21–18, 19–22, 19–24
	Pts: Heurtel 19; Rebs: Séraphin 10; Asts: Heurtel 9 PIR: Heurtel 24	Boxscore	Pts: Nedović 26; Rebs: Augustine 14; Asts: three players 4 PIR: Augustine 27	Arena: Palau Blaugrana; Attendance: 5,483; Referees: Ilija Belošević, Emin Moğulkoç, Mario Majkič

5 December 2025 14	Kirolbet Baskonia (Spanish Basketball Federation)	85–82	(Spanish Basketball Federation) FC Barcelona Lassa	Vitoria-Gasteiz
20:00	Scoring by quarter: 22–17, 30–18, 22–22, 11–25
	Pts: Shengelia 24; Rebs: Shengelia 6 Asts: Huertas 10; PIR: Shengelia 31	Boxscore	Pts: Ribas 15; Rebs: Oriola, Tomić 5 Asts: Navarro 7 PIR: Ribas 21	Arena: Fernando Buesa Arena; Attendance: 12,467; Referees: Luigi Lamonica, Piotr Pastusiak, Spiros Gkontas

29 December 2017 15	Khimki (Russian Basketball Federation)	65–79	(Spanish Basketball Federation) FC Barcelona Lassa	Mytishchi
18:00	Scoring by quarter: 15–25, 17–11, 25–21, 8–22
	Pts: Shved 22; Rebs: Gill 5 Asts: Monia 5 PIR: Honeycutt 18	Boxscore	Pts: three players 12; Rebs: Tomić 8 Asts: Ribas 8 PIR: Tomić 22	Arena: Mytishchi Arena; Attendance: 6,627; Referees: Saša Pukl, Borys Ryzhyk, Rain Peerandi

4 January 2018 16	FC Barcelona Lassa (Spanish Basketball Federation)	85–72	(Russian Basketball Federation) CSKA Moscow	Barcelona
21:00	Scoring by quarter: 25–17, 22–25, 19–13, 19–17
	Pts: Koponen 13; Rebs: Tomić, Moerman 7 Asts: Heurtel 8 PIR: Hanga 13	Boxscore	Pts: De Colo 23; Rebs: De Colo, Hines 6 Asts: Rodríguez 4 PIR: De Colo 31	Arena: Palau Blaugrana; Attendance: 6,609; Referees: Christos Christodoulou, Fernando Rocha, Mario Majkić

11 January 2018 17	Panathinaikos Superfoods Athens (Hellenic Basketball Federation)	84–75	(Spanish Basketball Federation) FC Barcelona Lassa	Athens
20:00	Scoring by quarter: 17–19, 19–15, 18–14, 30–27
	Pts: Calathes, Gist 17; Rebs: Gist 6 Asts: Calathes 12; PIR: Calathes 31	Boxscore	Pts: Heurtel 18; Rebs: Hanga, Moerman 6 Asts: Claver 4 PIR: Heurtel 17	Arena: Olympic Indoor Hall; Attendance: 17,158; Referees: Ilija Belošević, Carmelo Paternicò, Piotr Pastusiak

16 January 2018 18	Valencia Basket (Spanish Basketball Federation)	81–76	(Spanish Basketball Federation) FC Barcelona Lassa	Valencia
20:30	Scoring by quarter: 22–14, 21–22, 19–23, 19–17
	Pts: Dubljević 19; Rebs: Dubljević, Pleiß 7 Asts: Van Rossom 7 PIR: Dubljević 26	Boxscore	Pts: Oriola 15; Rebs: Moerman 8 Asts: Heurtel 10; PIR: Heurtel 26	Arena: Fuente de San Luis; Attendance: 7,375; Referees: Borys Ryzhyk, Tomislav Hordov, Sašo Petek

18 January 2018 19	FC Barcelona Lassa (Spanish Basketball Federation)	81–66	(German Basketball Federation) Brose Bamberg	Barcelona
21:00	Scoring by quarter: 18–15, 26–19, 15–18, 22–14
	Pts: Sanders 17; Rebs: Tomić 9 Asts: three players 3 PIR: Sanders 24	Boxscore	Pts: Lô 14; Rebs: Hackett 5 Asts: Hackett 8 PIR: Radošević 13	Arena: Palau Blaugrana; Attendance: 4,101; Referees: Sreten Radović, Elias Koromilas, Jakub Zamojski

26 January 2018 20	Fenerbahçe Doğuş (Turkish Basketball Federation)	86–82	(Spanish Basketball Federation) FC Barcelona Lassa	Istanbul
18:45	Scoring by quarter: 22–18, 20–26, 23–13, 21–25
	Pts: Wanamaker 24; Rebs: Veselý, Wanamaker 5 Asts: Wanamaker 7 PIR: Wanamaker 33	Boxscore	Pts: Heurtel 21; Rebs: Tomić 7 Asts: Ribas 7 PIR: Tomić 27	Arena: Ülker Sports Arena; Attendance: 12,930; Referees: Ilija Belošević, Saša Pukl, Sérgio Silva

1 February 2018 21	FC Barcelona Lassa (Spanish Basketball Federation)	81–83	(Italian Basketball Federation) AX Armani Exchange Olimpia	Barcelona
19:00	Scoring by quarter: 25–15, 23–27, 14–22, 19–19
	Pts: Tomić 14; Rebs: Tomić 6 Asts: Ribas 5 PIR: Tomić 24	Boxscore	Pts: Goudelock 20; Rebs: Gudaitis 9 Asts: Micov, Theodore 4 PIR: Gudaitis 26	Arena: Palau Blaugrana; Attendance: 4,002; Referees: Christos Christodoulou, Piotr Pastusiak, Mario Majkić

8 February 2018 22	Maccabi Tel Aviv (Israeli Basketball Association)	94–82	(Spanish Basketball Federation) FC Barcelona Lassa	Tel Aviv
20:05	Scoring by quarter: 22–23, 24–15, 19–23, 29–21
	Pts: Jackson 18; Rebs: Parakhouski 7 Asts: Cole 6 PIR: Parakhouski 19	Boxscore	Pts: Heurtel 18; Rebs: Moerman 7 Asts: Heurtel 10; PIR: Heurtel 23	Arena: Menora Mivtachim Arena; Attendance: 10,728; Referees: Milivoje Jovčić, Carmelo Paternicò, Jakub Zamojski

23 February 2018 23	FC Barcelona Lassa (Spanish Basketball Federation)	74–101	(Spanish Basketball Federation) Real Madrid	Barcelona
21:00	Scoring by quarter: 13–30, 22–22, 22–31, 17–18
	Pts: Heurtel, Vezenkov 11; Rebs: Moerman 5 Asts: Heurtel 6 PIR: Heurtel 16	Boxscore	Pts: Carroll 18; Rebs: Ayón 8 Asts: Campazzo 9 PIR: Campazzo 24	Arena: Palau Blaugrana; Attendance: 6,829; Referees: Robert Lottermoser, Sreten Radović, Milan Nedović

1 March 2018 24	Žalgiris (Lithuanian Basketball Federation)	90–74	(Spanish Basketball Federation) FC Barcelona Lassa	Kaunas
19:00	Scoring by quarter: 19–15, 25–19, 26–16, 20–24
	Pts: Toupane 21; Rebs: Ulanovas, White 6 Asts: Ulanovas 7 PIR: Pangos, Toupane 19	Boxscore	Pts: Oriola 18; Rebs: Claver 5 Asts: Heurtel 9 PIR: Oriola 20	Arena: Žalgirio Arena; Attendance: 14,477; Referees: Borys Ryzhyk, Oļegs Latiševs, Anne Panther

9 March 2018 25	FC Barcelona Lassa (Spanish Basketball Federation)	88–54	(Basketball Federation of Serbia) Crvena zvezda mts	Barcelona
21:00	Scoring by quarter: 17–12, 28–12, 17–25, 26–5
	Pts: Ribas 18; Rebs: Moerman 9 Asts: Ribas 6 PIR: Ribas 25	Boxscore	Pts: Rochestie 13; Rebs: Omić 5 Asts: Rochestie 3 PIR: Rochestie 14	Arena: Palau Blaugrana; Attendance: 6,829; Referees: Fernando Rocha, Spiros Gkontas, Petri Mäntylä

15 March 2018 26	Olympiacos (Hellenic Basketball Federation)	63–90	(Spanish Basketball Federation) FC Barcelona Lassa	Piraeus
20:00	Scoring by quarter: 17–22, 21–18, 14–23, 11–27
	Pts: McLean, Printezis 14; Rebs: McLean 12; Asts: Spanoulis 5 PIR: McLean 23	Boxscore	Pts: Tomić 19; Rebs: Moerman 13; Asts: Heurtel 7 PIR: Tomić 26	Arena: Peace and Friendship Stadium; Attendance: 10,032; Referees: Sreten Radović, Milivoje Jovčić, Piotr Pastusiak

21 March 2018 27	Unicaja (Spanish Basketball Federation)	95–91	(Spanish Basketball Federation) FC Barcelona Lassa	Málaga
20:45	Scoring by quarter: 19–25, 30–21, 27–22, 19–23
	Pts: Díez 21; Rebs: Augustine 7 Asts: three players 4 PIR: Díez 27	Boxscore	Pts: Tomić 22; Rebs: Tomić 11; Asts: Heurtel 10; PIR: Tomić 31	Arena: Palacio de Deportes José María Martín Carpena; Attendance: 6,925; Referees: Robert Lottermoser, Matej Boltauzer, Ingus Baumanis

23 March 2018 28	FC Barcelona Lassa (Spanish Basketball Federation)	73–86	(Spanish Basketball Federation) Kirolbet Baskonia	Barcelona
21:00	Scoring by quarter: 16–16, 24–27, 18–20, 15–23
	Pts: Koponen 21; Rebs: Moerman 8 Asts: Pressey 3 PIR: Jackson, Koponen 17	Boxscore	Pts: Voigtmann 17; Rebs: Poirier 8 Asts: Poirier 5 PIR: Poirier 22	Arena: Palau Blaugrana; Attendance: 6,829; Referees: Christos Christodoulou, Borys Rhyzhyk, Jakub Zamojski

29 March 2018 29	Anadolu Efes (Turkish Basketball Federation)	83–107	(Spanish Basketball Federation) FC Barcelona Lassa	Istanbul
19:45	Scoring by quarter: 19–23, 15–32, 33–26, 16–26
	Pts: Motum 19; Rebs: Štimac 4 Asts: Simon 7 PIR: Motum 21	Boxscore	Pts: Heurtel 20; Rebs: Moerman 9 Asts: Heurtel 9 PIR: Heurtel 29	Arena: Sinan Erdem; Attendance: 1,920; Referees: Luigi Lamonica, Ioannis Foufis, Sérgio Silva

5 April 2018 30	FC Barcelona Lassa (Spanish Basketball Federation)	86–82	(Russian Basketball Federation) Khimki	Barcelona
21:00	Scoring by quarter: 31–18, 23–27, 18–21, 14–16
	Pts: Navarro 17; Rebs: Vezenkov 6 Asts: Heurtel, Tomić 5 PIR: Heurtel 17	Boxscore	Pts: Gill 21; Rebs: Robinson 8 Asts: Shved 8 PIR: Gill 23	Arena: Palau Blaugrana; Attendance: 6,829; Referees: Damir Javor, Carmelo Paternicò, Emin Moğulkoç

=== Copa del Rey ===
==== Quarterfinals ====
16 February 2018	FC Barcelona Lassa	94–90	Kirolbet Baskonia	Las Palmas
21:30	Scoring by quarter: 28–22, 24–25, 22–20, 20–23
	Pts: Heurtel 20; Rebs: Tomić 9 Asts: Heurtel 9 PIR: Heurtel 27	Boxscore	Pts: Shengelia 30; Rebs: three players 5 Asts: Voigtmann 5 PIR: Shengelia 40	Arena: Gran Canaria Arena; Attendance: 9,695; Referees: Antonio Conde, Benjamín Jiménez, Fernando Calatrava

==== Semifinals ====
17 February 2018	Herbalife Gran Canaria	74–87	FC Barcelona Lassa	Las Palmas
21:30	Scoring by quarter: 15–21, 28–20, 13–27, 18–19
	Pts: Eriksson 25; Rebs: Aguilar 7 Asts: Oliver 4 PIR: Eriksson 28	Boxscore	Pts: Oriola 14; Rebs: Claver 8 Asts: Heurtel 14; PIR: Heurtel 24	Arena: Gran Canaria Arena; Attendance: 9,844; Referees: Juan Carlos García González, Antonio Conde, Fernando Calatrava

==== Final ====
18 February 2018	Real Madrid	90–92	FC Barcelona Lassa	Las Palmas
18:30	Scoring by quarter: 21–15, 13–25, 18–27, 38–25
	Pts: Carroll 18; Rebs: Dončić 5 Asts: Campazzo, Dončić 3 PIR: Thompkins 18	Boxscore	Pts: Ribas 21; Rebs: Moerman 7 Asts: Heurtel 7 PIR: Ribas 24	Arena: Gran Canaria Arena; Attendance: 9,912; Referees: Daniel Hierrezuelo, Emilio Pérez Pizarro, Carlos Peruga

== Individual awards ==
=== Lliga Catalana ===
Finals MVP

- (Croatia) Ante Tomić

=== Liga ACB ===
Player of the Round

- (France) Thomas Heurtel – Round 23
- (Croatia) Ante Tomić – Round 24
- (Finland) Petteri Koponen – Round 26

Player of the Month

- (Croatia) Ante Tomić – March

All-Liga ACB Second Team

- (France) Thomas Heurtel
- (Croatia) Ante Tomić

=== Copa del Rey ===
MVP

- (France) Thomas Heurtel
