= Villamayor (disambiguation) =

Villamayor may refer to:

- Villamayor in Salamanca, Spain
- Villamayor (Teverga) in Asturias, Spain
- Villamayor de Calatrava in Ciudad Real, Spain
- Villamayor de Campos in Zamora, Spain
- Villamayor de Gállego in Zaragoza, Spain
- Villamayor de Monjardín in Navarre, Spain
- Villamayor de los Montes in Burgos, Spain
- Villamayor de Santiago in Ceunca, Spain
- Villamayor de Treviño in Burgos, Spain
