= Luis Casimiro =

Spanish basketball coach (born 1960)

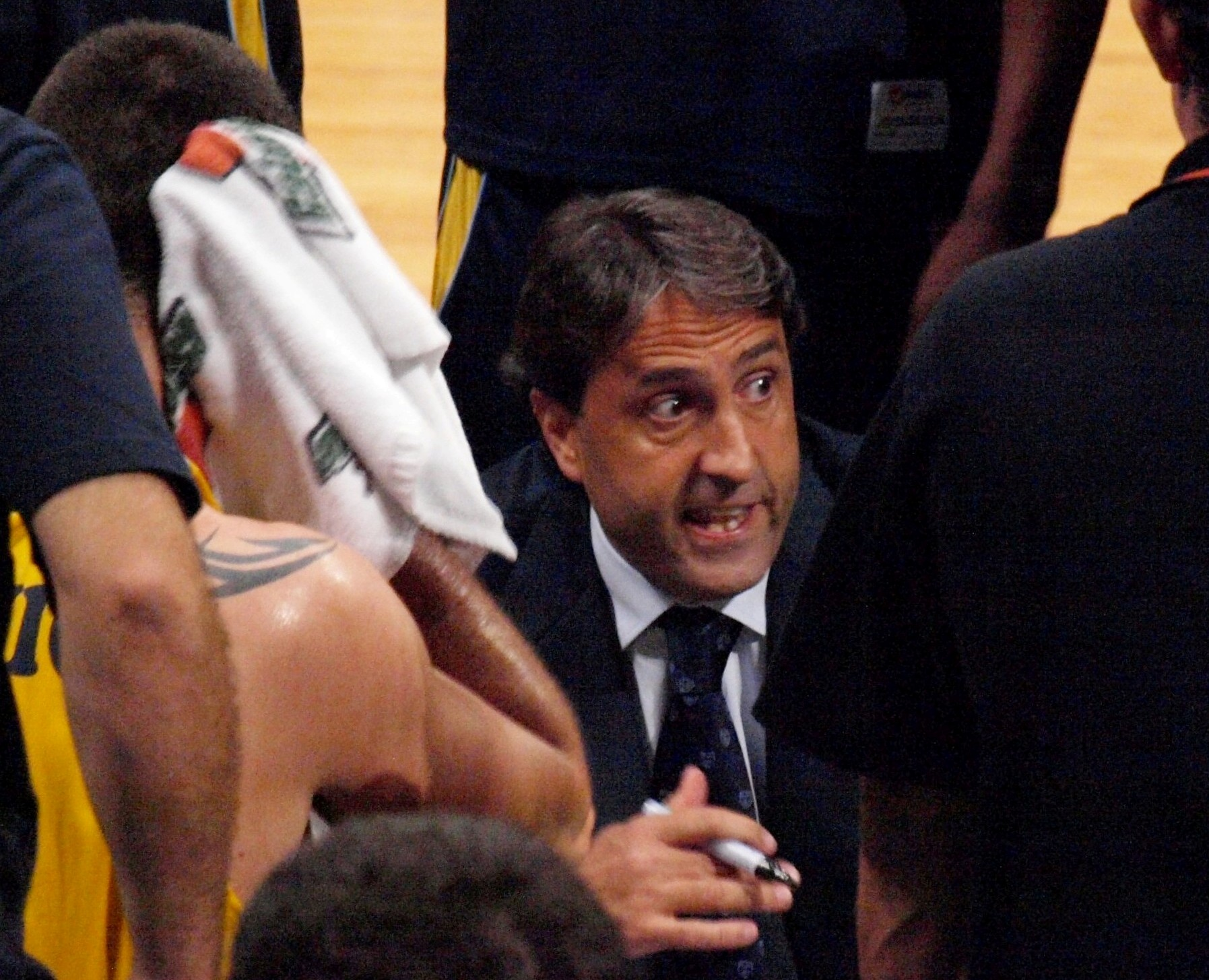
- Casimiro with Estudiantes in 2008

Río Breogán
- Position: Head coach
- League: Liga ACB

Personal information
- Born: July 21, 1960 (age 66) Villamayor de Calatrava, Spain
- Coaching career: 1989–present

Career history

Coaching
- Puertollano
- Almodóvar del Campo
- 1990–1992: Don Benito
- 1992–1993: Breogán (assistant)
- 1993–1994: Gandía
- 1994–1995: Lucentum Alicante
- 1995–1996: Salamanca (assistant)
- 1996–1997: Gijón Baloncesto
- 1997–1999: Manresa
- 1999–2000: Cáceres
- 2000–2002: Valencia
- 2002–2003: Valladolid
- 2003: Lucentum Alicante
- 2004–2008: Fuenlabrada
- 2008–2011: Estudiantes
- 2011–2012: Valladolid
- 2012: Málaga
- 2014–2015: Fuenlabrada
- 2015–2016: Sevilla
- 2016–2018: Gran Canaria
- 2018–2021: Unicaja
- 2021: Promitheas Patras
- 2021–2023: Real Betis
- 2024–present: Breogán

Career highlights
- Liga ACB (1998); AEEB Spanish Coach of the Year (1998); Supercopa de España (2016)

Luis Casimiro Palomo Cárdenas, more known as simply Luis Casimiro, is a Spanish professional basketball coach, who is currently a coach for Río Breogán of the Liga ACB.

== Early years ==
Born in Villamayor de Calatrava, province of Ciudad Real, Casimiro had a very short career as a basketball player.

== Coaching career ==
Casimiro started coaching CB Puertollano, and other Castilian-Manchegan teams, before joining CB Breogán in 1993, as an assistant coach of Ricardo Hevia in the Liga ACB.

In 1993, Casimiro managed Gandía BA, of the Spanish second-tier level, in his first professional experience as a head coach.

Five years later, Casimiro managed TDK Manresa to win the 1997–98 Liga ACB, which is considered to be one of the biggest miracles in the history of Spanish professional club basketball.

After leaving Manresa, Casimiro continued coaching in Spain, in different teams of the Liga ACB and LEB Oro.

In 2002, Casimiro ended up as a runner-up of the Saporta Cup, with Pamesa Valencia. The team was defeated by Montepaschi Siena in the league's final game.

Three years later, he managed Baloncesto Fuenlabrada to achieve a league promotion to the Liga ACB, by winning the 2004–05 LEB. With this title, Casimiro became the first coach to ever win the Liga ACB and the LEB.

On 25 September 2016, Casimiro led Herbalife Gran Canaria to win the 2016 Spanish Supercup title, its first ever national title. In the 2017–18 season, Casimiro reached the ACB semi-finals with Gran Canaria. With this achievement, the team also qualified for the next EuroLeague season, the club's first participation ever. On 13 June 2018, Gran Canaria announced the club and Casimiro separated ways.

On July 8, 2021, he has signed with Promitheas Patras of the Greek Basket League.

On November 22, 2021, he has signed a two-year contract with Coosur Real Betis of the Liga ACB. At the end of the 2022–2023 season, as Real Betis Baloncesto was relegated to LEB Oro after ending the season in 17th position, it was announced that his contract would not be renewed.

On December 4, 2024, he was announced as the new head coach of Río Breogán, also an ACB team, after previous coach Veljko Mršić was fired.

== Honours ==
Bàsquet Manresa

- Liga ACB (1): 1997–98
- Lliga Catalana de Bàsquet (2): 1997, 1998

CB Gran Canaria

- Supercopa de España (1): 2016

Valencia

- Saporta Cup runner-up: 2001–02

Baloncesto Fuenlabrada

- LEB (1): 2004–05
- Copa Príncipe de Asturias (1): 2005

Individual

- AEEB Spanish Coach of the Year: 1998
