= 2018 ACB Playoffs =

Spanish post-season basketball tournament

Tournament details
- Country: Spain
- Dates: 27 May 2018 – 22 June 2018
- Teams: 8
- Defending champions: Valencia Basket

Final positions
- Champions: Real Madrid (34th title)
- Runners-up: Kirolbet Baskonia
- Semifinalists: FC Barcelona Lassa; Herbalife Gran Canaria

Tournament statistics
- Matches played: 21
- Attendance: 175,651 (8,364 per match)
- All statistics correct as of 19 June 2018.

The 2018 ACB Playoffs, also known as 2018 Liga Endesa Playoffs for sponsorship reasons, was the postseason tournament of the ACB's 2017–18 season, which began September 29, 2017. The playoffs started on 27 May 2018 and ended on 19 June 2018 with the Finals.

Valencia Basket was the defending champion, but was defeated in quarterfinals by Herbalife Gran Canaria, who achieved qualification to the EuroLeague for the first time ever, but was defeated in semifinals by Real Madrid who won their 34th title after defeating Kirolbet Baskonia in finals.

== Format ==
At the end of the regular season, the eight teams with the most wins qualify for the playoffs. The seedings are based on each team's record.

The bracket is fixed; there is no reseeding. The quarterfinals are best-of-three series; the team that wins two games advances to the next round. This round is in a 1–1–1 format. From the semifinals onward, the rounds are best-of-five series; the team that wins three games advances to the next round. These rounds, including the Finals, are in a 2–2–1 format. Home court advantage in any round belong to the higher-seeded team.

== Playoff qualifying ==
On 8 April 2018, Real Madrid became the first team to clinch a playoff spot.

Seed	Team	Record	Clinched		
Seed	Team	Record	Playoff berth	Seeded team	Top seed
1	Real Madrid	30–4	8 April	10 April	3 May
2	Kirolbet Baskonia	25–9	28 April	6 May	–
3	FC Barcelona Lassa	24–10	28 April	6 May	–
4	Valencia Basket	22–12	28 April	13 May	–
5	Herbalife Gran Canaria	20–14	12 May	–	–
6	MoraBanc Andorra	19–15	13 May	–	–
7	Unicaja	19–15	13 May	–	–
8	Iberostar Tenerife	19–15	24 May	–	–

== Bracket ==
Teams in bold advance to the next round. The numbers to the left of each team indicate the team's seeding, and the numbers to the right indicate the result of games including result in bold of the team that won in that game.

Quarterfinals
**1** Real Madrid	**83**	**84**
**8** Iberostar Tenerife	73	75
**4** Valencia Basket	**71**	70	89
**5** Herbalife Gran Canaria	56	**97**	**92**
**2** Kirolbet Baskonia	**87**	**80**
**7** Unicaja	70	64
**3** FC Barcelona Lassa	76	**85**	**91**
**6** MoraBanc Andorra	**94**	81	71

Semifinals
**1** Real Madrid	**88**	**92**	**99**
**5** Herbalife Gran Canaria	70	83	92
**2** Kirolbet Baskonia	**86**	**85**	65	**88**
**3** FC Barcelona Lassa	61	79	**67**	82

Finals
**1** Real Madrid	90	**98**	**83**	**96**
**2** Kirolbet Baskonia	**94**	91	78	85

== Quarterfinals ==
All times are in Central European Summer Time (UTC+02:00)

=== Real Madrid v Iberostar Tenerife ===
27 May 2018	**Real Madrid**	**83**–73 (Series: **1–0**)	Iberostar Tenerife	Madrid
12:30	Scoring by quarter: **21**–15, **21**–18, **16**–15, 25–25
	Pts: Carroll 15; Rebs: Randolph 11; Asts: Llull 4 PIR: Reyes 18	Boxscore	Pts: Tobey 21; Rebs: Tobey 8 Asts: Bassas 6 PIR: Tobey 18	Arena: WiZink Center; Attendance: 8,449; Referees: Daniel Hierrezuelo, Jordi Aliaga, Jorge Martínez

29 May 2018	Iberostar Tenerife	75–**84** (Series: **0–2**)	**Real Madrid**	San Cristóbal de La Laguna
22:00	Scoring by quarter: 14–14, 18–**30**, **23**–19, 20–**21**
	Pts: Tobey 18; Rebs: Tobey 16; Asts: three players 4 PIR: Tobey 24	Boxscore	Pts: Fernández 19; Rebs: Tavares 13; Asts: Llull 7 PIR: Tavares 26	Arena: Santiago Martín; Attendance: 5,176; Referees: Antonio Conde, Vicente Bultó, Jacobo Rial

Regular season series
Madrid won 2–0 in the regular season series

4 November 2017

Boxscore

Iberostar Tenerife	74–**84**	**Real Madrid**

Santiago Martín, San Cristóbal de La Laguna

11 February 2018

Boxscore

**Real Madrid**	**89**–76	Iberostar Tenerife

WiZink Center, Madrid

This was the first meeting in the playoffs between Real Madrid and Iberostar Tenerife.

=== Kirolbet Baskonia v Unicaja ===
27 May 2018	**Kirolbet Baskonia**	**87**–70 (Series: **1–0**)	Unicaja	Vitoria-Gasteiz
18:30	Scoring by quarter: **18**–16, **26**–20, 15–**20**, **28**–14
	Pts: Timma 12; Rebs: Poirier 7 Asts: Huertas, Vildoza 6 PIR: Poirier 17	Boxscore	Pts: Nedović 12; Rebs: Shermadini 5 Asts: Nedović 5 PIR: Nedović 16	Arena: Fernando Buesa Arena; Attendance: 10,084; Referees: Benjamín Jiménez, Francisco José Araña, Sergio Manuel

29 May 2018	Unicaja	64–**80** (Series: **0–2**)	**Kirolbet Baskonia**	Málaga
19:45	Scoring by quarter: 11–**27**, 22–**25**, 15–**16**, **16**–12
	Pts: Nedović 14; Rebs: Brooks, Suárez 6 Asts: Díaz, Suárez 4 PIR: Shermadini, Suárez 18	Boxscore	Pts: Beaubois 13; Rebs: Diop 8 Asts: Huertas 8 PIR: Huertas 24	Arena: Martín Carpena; Attendance: 7,393; Referees: Miguel Ángel Pérez Pérez, Luis Miguel Castillo, Martín Caballero

Regular season series
Baskonia won 2–0 in the regular season series

5 November 2017

Boxscore

Unicaja	72–**73**	**Baskonia**

Martín Carpena, Málaga

10 February 2018

Boxscore

**Baskonia**	**96**–78	Unicaja

Fernando Buesa Arena, Vitoria-Gasteiz

This was the ninth playoff meeting between these two teams, with Kirolbet Baskonia winning five of the first eight meetings.

Previous playoff series
Baskonia leads 5–3 in all-time playoff series

1998

**TAU Cerámica**	**3**–0	Unicaja

1998 Quarterfinals

2002

**TAU Cerámica**	**3**–0	Unicaja

2002 Finals

2003

**Unicaja**	**3**–2	TAU Cerámica

2003 Quarterfinals

2005

**TAU Cerámica**	**3**–1	Unicaja

2005 Semifinals

2006

**Unicaja**	**3**–0	TAU Cerámica

2006 Finals

2007

**TAU Cerámica**	**3**–0	Unicaja

2007 Quarterfinals

2008

**TAU Cerámica**	**2**–0	Unicaja

2008 Semifinals

2015

**Unicaja**	**2**–1	Laboral Kutxa Baskonia

2015 Quarterfinals

=== FC Barcelona Lassa v MoraBanc Andorra ===
27 May 2018	FC Barcelona Lassa	76–**94** (Series: **0–1**)	**MoraBanc Andorra**	Barcelona
20:45	Scoring by quarter: 22–**27**, 18–18, 17–**21**, 19–**28**
	Pts: Koponen 17; Rebs: Moerman 11; Asts: Heurtel 4 PIR: Tomić 21	Boxscore	Pts: Blažič 14; Rebs: Iverson 5 Asts: Albicy, Janković 6 PIR: Fernández 15	Arena: Palau Blaugrana; Attendance: 4,011; Referees: Carlos Peruga, Óscar Perea, Raúl Zamorano

30 May 2018	MoraBanc Andorra	81–**85** (Series: **1–1**)	**FC Barcelona Lassa**	Andorra la Vella
19:45	Scoring by quarter: **22**–17, 20–**25**, 21–**22**, 18–**21**
	Pts: Albicy 22; Rebs: Blažič 9 Asts: Fernández 5 PIR: Albicy 19	Boxscore	Pts: Tomić 19; Rebs: Tomić 6 Asts: Heurtel, Tomić 4 PIR: Tomić 31	Arena: Poliesportiu d'Andorra; Attendance: 4,774; Referees: Emilio Pérez Pizarro, Fernando Calatrava, Andrés Fernández

1 June 2018	**FC Barcelona Lassa**	**91**–71 (Series: **2–1**)	MoraBanc Andorra	Barcelona
19:45	Scoring by quarter: **26**–16, 19–**21**, **24**–15, **22**–19
	Pts: Hanga, Tomić 15; Rebs: Moerman 12; Asts: Heurtel 5 PIR: Claver, Tomić 16	Boxscore	Pts: Blažič 13; Rebs: Diagne, Shurna 5 Asts: Albicy 5 PIR: Diagne 15	Arena: Palau Blaugrana; Attendance: 6,438; Referees: Daniel Hierrezuelo, Juan Carlos García González, Miguel Ángel Pérez Pérez

Regular season series
Tied 1–1 in the regular season series

21 January 2018

Boxscore

**MoraBanc Andorra**	**102**–92	FC Barcelona Lassa

Poliesportiu d'Andorra, Andorra la Vella

5 May 2018

Boxscore

**FC Barcelona Lassa**	**94**–70	MoraBanc Andorra

Palau Blaugrana, Barcelona

This was the second playoff meeting between these two teams, with FC Barcelona Lassa winning the previous meeting.

Previous playoff series
Barcelona leads 1–0 in all-time playoff series

1995

**FC Barcelona Banca Catalana**	**2**–0	Festina Andorra

1995 Quarterfinals

=== Valencia Basket v Herbalife Gran Canaria ===
28 May 2018	**Valencia Basket**	**71**–56 (Series: **1–0**)	Herbalife Gran Canaria	Valencia
20:30	Scoring by quarter: **22**–11, 13–**25**, **15**–7, **21**–13
	Pts: Van Rossom 17; Rebs: Dubljević 9 Asts: three players 3 PIR: Van Rossom 17	Boxscore	Pts: Eriksson 11; Rebs: Balvín 9 Asts: Oliver 4 PIR: Báez, Pasečņiks 9	Arena: Fuente de San Luis; Attendance: 7,116; Referees: José Antonio Martín Bertrán, Carlos Cortés, Rafael Serrano

30 May 2018	**Herbalife Gran Canaria**	**97**–70 (Series: **1–1**)	Valencia Basket	Las Palmas
22:00	Scoring by quarter: **22**–21, **24**–12, **26**–24, **25**–13
	Pts: Rabaseda 22; Rebs: Paulí 6 Asts: Oliver 5 PIR: Rabaseda 25	Boxscore	Pts: Dubljević, Van Rossom 11; Rebs: Dubljević 4 Asts: San Emeterio 3 PIR: San Emeterio 13	Arena: Gran Canaria Arena; Attendance: 5,332; Referees: Juan Carlos García González, José Ramón García Ortiz, Juan de Dios Oyón

1 June 2018	Valencia Basket	89–**92**(OT) (Series: **1–2**)	**Herbalife Gran Canaria**	Valencia
22:00	Scoring by quarter: 14–**20**, **23**–18, **23**–17, 21–**26**, Overtime: 8–**11**
	Pts: San Emeterio 22; Rebs: Dubljević 6 Asts: three players 3 PIR: San Emeterio 26	Boxscore	Pts: Eriksson 18; Rebs: Balvín 12; Asts: Mekel 8 PIR: Balvín, Eriksson 19	Arena: Fuente de San Luis; Attendance: 7,890; Referees: Emilio Pérez Pizarro, Benjamín Jiménez, Carlos Peruga

Regular season series
Tied 1–1 in the regular season series

29 October 2017

Boxscore

**Valencia Basket**	**89**–83	Herbalife Gran Canaria

Fuente de San Luis, Valencia

4 March 2018

Boxscore

**Herbalife Gran Canaria**	**87**–78	Valencia Basket

Gran Canaria Arena, Las Palmas

This was the first meeting in the playoffs between Valencia Basket and Herbalife Gran Canaria.

== Semifinals ==
All times are in Central European Summer Time (UTC+02:00)

=== Real Madrid v Herbalife Gran Canaria ===
3 June 2018	**Real Madrid**	**88**–70 (Series: **1–0**)	Herbalife Gran Canaria	Madrid
18:30	Scoring by quarter: 14–**22**, **28**–10, **20**–17, **26**–21
	Pts: Tavares 17; Rebs: Reyes, Tavares 7 Asts: Dončić 7 PIR: Tavares 22	Boxscore	Pts: four players 10; Rebs: Aguilar 6 Asts: Oliver 7 PIR: Aguilar, Radičević 13	Arena: WiZink Center; Attendance: 9,710; Referees: José Antonio Martín Bertrán, Emilio Pérez Pizarro, Luis Miguel Castillo

5 June 2018	**Real Madrid**	**92**–83 (Series: **2–0**)	Herbalife Gran Canaria	Madrid
21:00	Scoring by quarter: 19–**21**, **33**–29, 18–**20**, **22**–13
	Pts: Dončić 14; Rebs: Ayón, Dončić 7 Asts: Dončić 7 PIR: Ayón, Dončić 20	Boxscore	Pts: Balvín 13; Rebs: Balvín 8 Asts: Mekel 7 PIR: Balvín 26	Arena: WiZink Center; Attendance: 9,256; Referees: Juan Carlos García González, Carlos Peruga, Óscar Perea

7 June 2018	Herbalife Gran Canaria	92–**99** (Series: **0–3**)	**Real Madrid**	Las Palmas
21:00	Scoring by quarter: **27**–25, 23–**25**, 21–**29**, **21**–20
	Pts: Báez 17; Rebs: Aguilar 6 Asts: Mekel 7 PIR: Aguilar 23	Boxscore	Pts: Fernández 21; Rebs: Fernández 5 Asts: Dončić 5 PIR: Fernández 24	Arena: Gran Canaria Arena; Attendance: 6,419; Referees: Daniel Hierrezuelo, Carlos Cortés, Sergio Manuel

Regular season series
Tied 1–1 in the regular season series

3 December 2017

Boxscore

**Real Madrid**	**96**–72	Herbalife Gran Canaria

WiZink Center, Madrid

24 May 2018

Boxscore

**Herbalife Gran Canaria**	**88**–78	Real Madrid

Gran Canaria Arena, Las Palmas

This was the 3rd playoff meeting between these two teams, with Real Madrid winning the previous two meetings.

Previous playoff series
Madrid leads 2–0 in all-time playoff series

2000

**Real Madrid Teka**	**3**–0	Canarias Telecom

2000 Quarterfinals

2015

**Real Madrid**	**2**–0	Herbalife Gran Canaria

2015 Quarterfinals

=== Kirolbet Baskonia v FC Barcelona Lassa ===
4 June 2018	**Kirolbet Baskonia**	**86**–61 (Series: **1–0**)	FC Barcelona Lassa	Vitoria-Gasteiz
21:00	Scoring by quarter: **20**–15, **27**–13, **20**–12, 19–**21**
	Pts: three players 13; Rebs: Voigtmann 9 Asts: Granger 5 PIR: Shengelia, Voigtmann 17	Boxscore	Pts: Koponen 12; Rebs: Reynolds 8 Asts: Heurtel 6 PIR: Reynolds 11	Arena: Fernando Buesa Arena; Attendance: 9,764; Referees: Daniel Hierrezuelo, Benjamín Jiménez, Fernando Calatrava

6 June 2018	**Kirolbet Baskonia**	**85**–79 (Series: **2–0**)	FC Barcelona Lassa	Vitoria-Gasteiz
21:00	Scoring by quarter: 18–**26**, 20–**22**, **29**–17, **18**–14
	Pts: Janning 19; Rebs: Poirier, Shengelia 7 Asts: Granger 5 PIR: Janning 20	Boxscore	Pts: Moerman 18; Rebs: Moerman, Tomić 5 Asts: Heurtel 6 PIR: Moerman 21	Arena: Fernando Buesa Arena; Attendance: 9,814; Referees: Miguel Ángel Pérez Pérez, Antonio Conde, Rafael Serrano

8 June 2018	**FC Barcelona Lassa**	**67**–65 (Series: **1–2**)	Kirolbet Baskonia	Barcelona
21:00	Scoring by quarter: 18–**19**, 13–**14**, **16**–12, 20–20
	Pts: Tomić 15; Rebs: Moerman 9 Asts: Hanga 5 PIR: Tomić 26	Boxscore	Pts: Shengelia 11; Rebs: Poirier 12; Asts: Huertas 7 PIR: Huertas, Shengelia 12	Arena: Palau Blaugrana; Attendance: 5,661; Referees: Emilio Pérez Pizarro, Benjamín Jiménez, Carlos Peruga

10 June 2018	FC Barcelona Lassa	82–**88**(OT) (Series: **1–3**)	**Kirolbet Baskonia**	Barcelona
18:30	Scoring by quarter: 16–**21**, 18–**23**, **19**–15, **23**–17, Overtime: 6–**12**
	Pts: Heurtel 16; Rebs: Tomić 9 Asts: Heurtel 5 PIR: Tomić 27	Boxscore	Pts: Shengelia 22; Rebs: Shengelia, Voigtmann 7 Asts: Huertas 7 PIR: Shengelia 33	Arena: Palau Blaugrana; Attendance: 6,089; Referees: Daniel Hierrezuelo, Miguel Ángel Pérez Pérez, Fernando Calatrava

Regular season series
Tied 1–1 in the regular season series

29 September 2017

Boxscore

**FC Barcelona Lassa**	**87**–82	Baskonia

Palau Blaugrana, Barcelona

4 February 2018

Boxscore

**Baskonia**	**96**–72	FC Barcelona Lassa

Fernando Buesa Arena, Vitoria-Gasteiz

This was the 13th playoff meeting between these two teams, with FC Barcelona Lassa winning seven of the first 12 meetings.

Previous playoff series
Barcelona leads 7–5 in all-time playoff series

1996

**FC Barcelona Banca Catalana**	**2**–1	Taugrés

1996 Quarterfinals

1998

**TAU Cerámica**	**3**–0	FC Barcelona Banca Catalana

1998 Semifinals

2000

**FC Barcelona**	**3**–1	TAU Cerámica

2000 Semifinals

2002

FC Barcelona	1–**3**	**TAU Cerámica**

2002 Semifinals

2006

**TAU Cerámica**	**3**–0	Winterthur FC Barcelona

2006 Semifinals

2007

TAU Cerámica	2–**3**	**Winterthur FC Barcelona**

2007 Semifinals

2008

AXA FC Barcelona	0–**3**	**TAU Cerámica**

2008 Finals

2009

TAU Cerámica	1–**3**	**Regal FC Barcelona**

2009 Finals

2010

Regal FC Barcelona	0–**3**	**Caja Laboral**

2010 Finals

2011

**Regal FC Barcelona**	**3**–0	Caja Laboral

2011 Semifinals

2014

**FC Barcelona**	**2**–0	Laboral Kutxa

2014 Quarterfinals

2016

**FC Barcelona Lassa**	**3**–1	Laboral Kutxa Baskonia

2016 Semifinals

== Finals ==
All times are in Central European Summer Time (UTC+02:00)

13 June 2018	Real Madrid	90–**94** (Series: **0–1**)	**Kirolbet Baskonia**	Madrid
21:00	Scoring by quarter: 17–**19**, **22**–20, 19–**28**, **32**–27
	Pts: Carroll 20; Rebs: Ayón 7 Asts: Campazzo 5 PIR: Tavares 17	Boxscore	Pts: Timma 16; Rebs: Shengelia, Voigtmann 7 Asts: Janning 6 PIR: Timma 18	Arena: WiZink Center; Attendance: 11,067; Referees: Emilio Pérez Pizarro, Antonio Conde, Carlos Peruga

15 June 2018	**Real Madrid**	**98**–91 (Series: **1–1**)	Kirolbet Baskonia	Madrid
22:15	Scoring by quarter: 28–**33**, **24**–19, **31**–13, 15–**26**
	Pts: Carroll, Thompkins 16; Rebs: Ayón 10; Asts: Campazzo 4 PIR: Ayón 21	Boxscore	Pts: Janning 18; Rebs: Poirier 6 Asts: Granger 5 PIR: Diop 19	Arena: WiZink Center; Attendance: 11,208; Referees: Daniel Hierrezuelo, Benjamín Jiménez, Óscar Perea

17 June 2018	Kirolbet Baskonia	78–**83** (Series: **1–2**)	**Real Madrid**	Vitoria-Gasteiz
18:30	Scoring by quarter: **24**–20, 18–**20**, 21–**25**, 15–**18**
	Pts: Beaubois 17; Rebs: Poirier, Shengelia 7 Asts: Vildoza 6 PIR: Poirier, Vildoza 14	Boxscore	Pts: Dončić 20; Rebs: Dončić 9 Asts: Llull 5 PIR: Dončić 29	Arena: Fernando Buesa Arena; Attendance: 15,512; Referees: José Antonio Martín Bertrán, Miguel Ángel Pérez Pérez, Carlos Cortés

19 June 2018	Kirolbet Baskonia	85–**96** (Series: **1–3**)	**Real Madrid**	Vitoria-Gasteiz
21:00	Scoring by quarter: **21**–18, 17–**24**, 19–**23**, 28–**31**
	Pts: Beaubois 19; Rebs: Poirier 4 Asts: Huertas 5 PIR: Beaubois 20	Boxscore	Pts: Fernández 27; Rebs: Dončić 8 Asts: Campazzo 7 PIR: Fernández 33	Arena: Fernando Buesa Arena; Attendance: 14,488; Referees: Emilio Pérez Pizarro, Antonio Conde, Benjamín Jiménez

Regular season series
Madrid won 2–0 in the regular season series

3 January 2018

Boxscore

Baskonia	69–**81**	**Real Madrid**

Fernando Buesa Arena, Vitoria-Gasteiz

3 May 2018

Boxscore

**Real Madrid**	**101**–89	Kirolbet Baskonia

WiZink Center, Madrid

This was the 11th playoff meeting between these two teams, with Real Madrid winning seven of the first 10 meetings.

Previous playoff series
Madrid leads 7–3 in all-time playoff series

1988

**Real Madrid**	**2**–1	Taugrés

1988 Quarterfinals

1989

**Real Madrid**	**2**–0	Taugrés

1989 Quarterfinals

1990

**Real Madrid**	**2**–0	Taugrés

1990 Quarterfinals

1991

Real Madrid Otaysa	0–**2**	**Taugrés**

1991 Quarterfinals

1992

**Real Madrid Asegurator**	**3**–2	Taugrés

1992 Semifinals

2001

**Real Madrid**	**3**–2	TAU Cerámica

2001 Semifinals

2005

TAU Cerámica	2–**3**	**Real Madrid**

2005 Finals

2009

**TAU Cerámica**	**2**–1	Real Madrid

2009 Semifinals

2010

**Caja Laboral**	**3**–2	Real Madrid

2010 Semifinals

2012

**Real Madrid**	**3**–2	Caja Laboral

2012 Semifinals
