= Villamayor de Campos =

Coordinates: 41°54′N 5°21′W

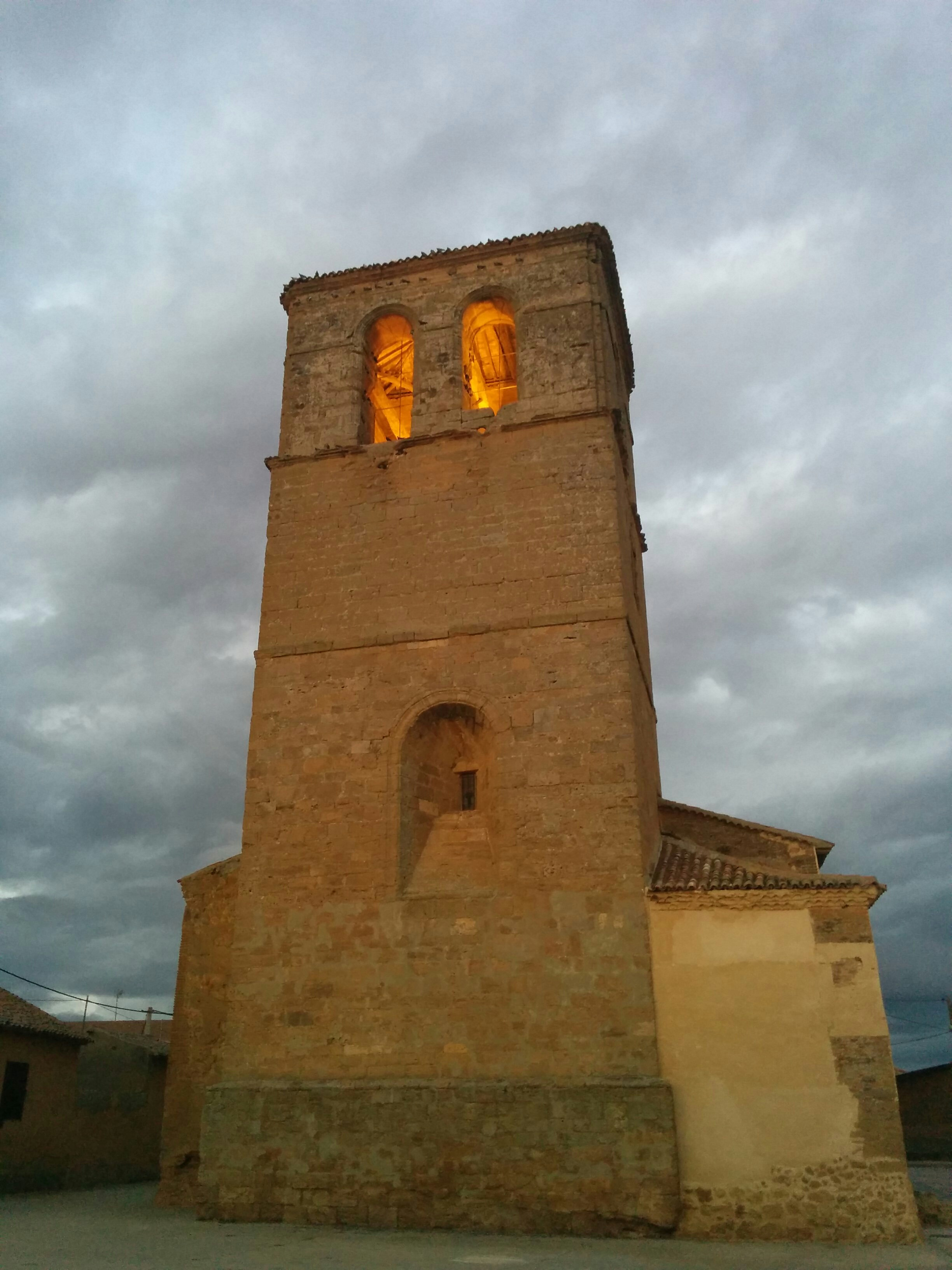
- Interactive map of Villamayor de Campos
- Country: Spain
- Autonomous community: Castile and León
- Province: Zamora
- Municipality: Villamayor de Campos

Area
  - Total: 26 km^{2} (10 sq mi)

Population (2025-01-01)
  - Total: 330
  - Density: 13/km^{2} (33/sq mi)
- Time zone: UTC+1 (CET)
  - Summer (DST): UTC+2 (CEST)

Villamayor de Campos is a municipality located in the province of Zamora, Castile and León, Spain. According to the 2004 census (INE), the municipality has a population of 492 inhabitants.
