= 2017–18 ACB season =

Liga Endesa^{1}
- Season: 2017–18
- Games played: 327
- Teams: 18
- TV partner: Movistar+

Regular season
- Season MVP: (Slovenia) Luka Dončić
- Relegated: RETAbet Bilbao Basket; Real Betis Energía Plus

Finals
- Champions: Real Madrid (34th title)
- Runners-up: Kirolbet Baskonia
- Semi-finalists: FC Barcelona Lassa; Herbalife Gran Canaria
- Finals MVP: (Spain) Rudy Fernández

Statistical leaders
Points	(United States) Gary Neal	20.6
Rebounds	(United States) Deon Thompson	6.7
Assists	(Montenegro) Omar Cook	6.8
Index Rating	(Netherlands) Henk Norel	19.5

Records
- Biggest home win: Barcelona 121–56 Real Betis (11 April 2018); League record
- Biggest away win: Real Betis 62–109 Tenerife (24 May 2018)
- Highest scoring: Obradoiro 112–116 Estudiantes (21 April 2018)
- Winning streak: 11 games Real Madrid
- Losing streak: 13 games Divina Seguros Joventut
- Highest attendance: 15,512; Baskonia 79–83 Real Madrid (17 June 2018)
- Lowest attendance: 1,315; Real Betis 62–109 Tenerife (24 May 2018)
- ^{1} Sponsored league name, referring to Endesa.

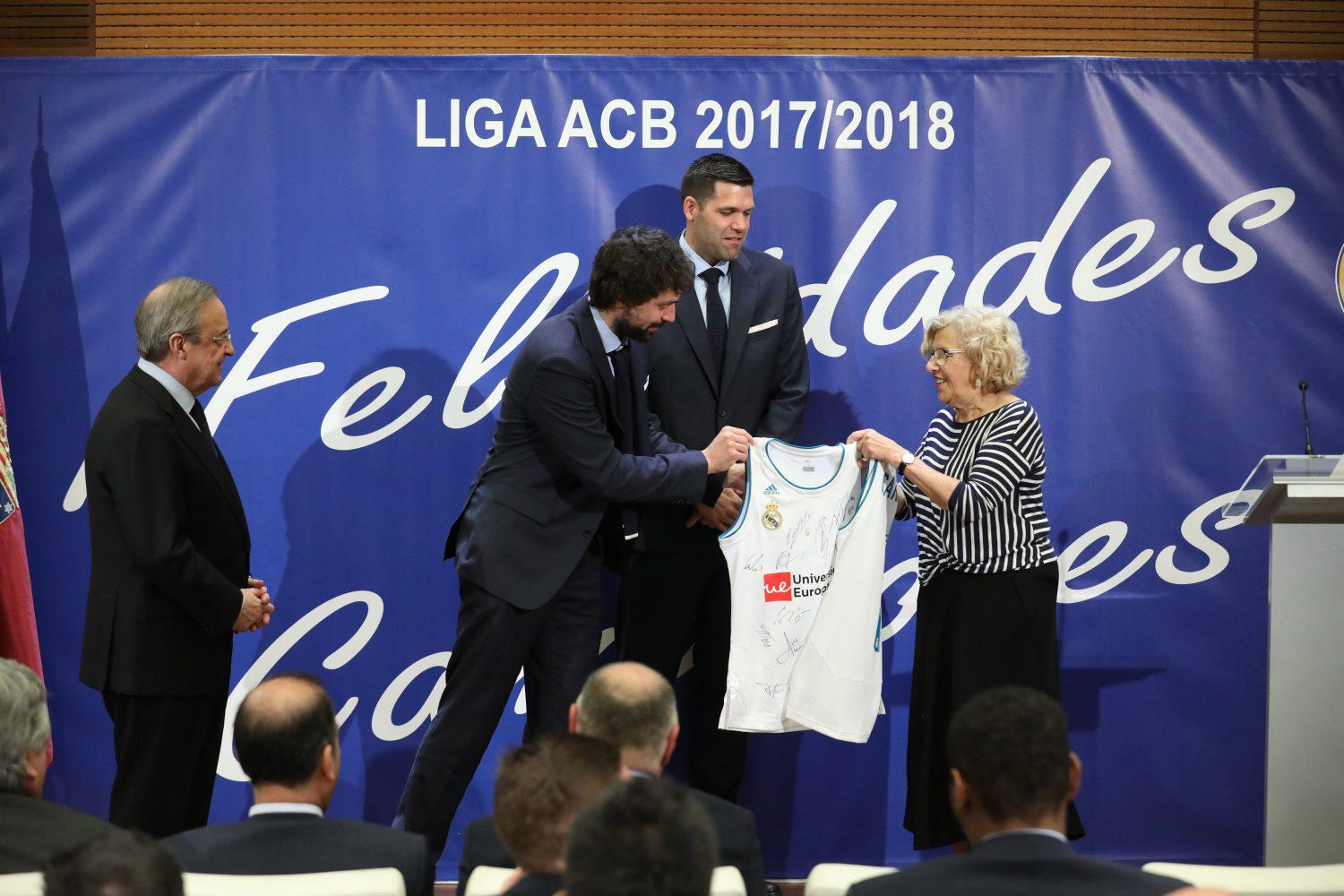
El Real Madrid ofrece su 34ª liga de baloncesto a los madrileños 07

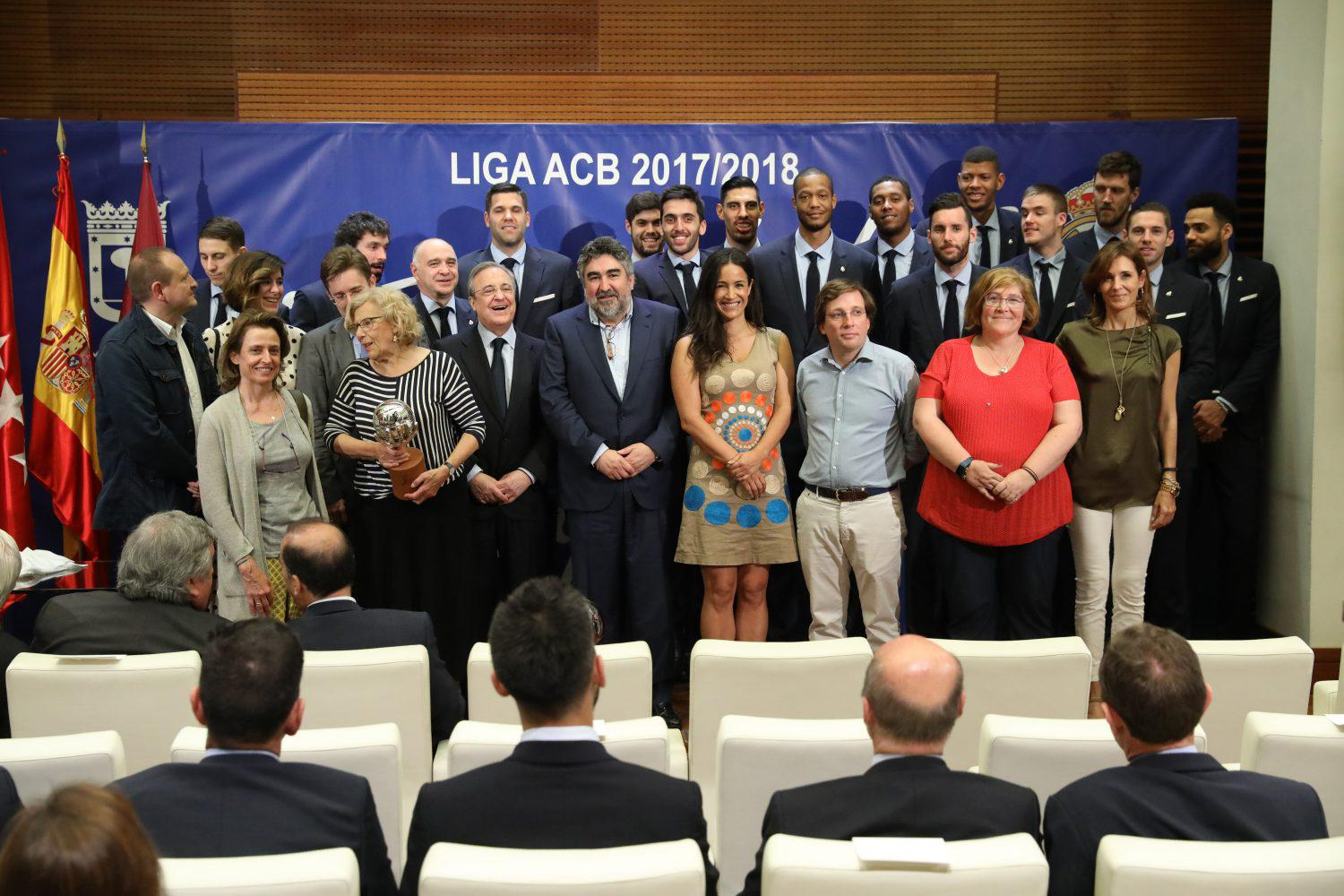
El Real Madrid ofrece su 34ª liga de baloncesto a los madrileños 09

The 2017–18 ACB season, also known as Liga Endesa for sponsorship reasons, was the 35th season of the Spanish basketball league. It started on 29 September 2017 with the first round of the regular season and ended on 19 June 2018 with the finals.

Valencia Basket was the defending champion, but was defeated in quarterfinals by Herbalife Gran Canaria, who achieved qualification to the EuroLeague for the first time ever, but was defeated in semifinals by Real Madrid who won their 34th title after defeating Kirolbet Baskonia in finals.

== Teams ==
=== Promotion and relegation (pre-season) ===
A total of 18 teams contested the league, including 16 sides from the 2016–17 season and two promoted from the 2016–17 LEB Oro. This include the top team from the LEB Oro, and the winners of the LEB Oro playoffs.

As of 10 July 2017, the ACB, forced by the statement of the National Commission for Markets and Competence (CNMC), agreed with the Spanish Basketball Federation and endorsed by the CSD to reduce the requirements to fulfill by the promoted teams for playing in the league. On August 11, 2017, the ACB proceeded to the precautionary and provisional registration of the Real Betis Energía Plus, in application of the precautionary measures issued by the judicial demand of the Andalusian club.

Teams promoted from LEB Oro

- Delteco GBC
- San Pablo Burgos

Teams relegated to LEB Oro

- ~~Real Betis Energía Plus~~
- ICL Manresa

=== Venues and locations ===
Location of teams in 2017–18 ACB
Location of teams from the Canary Islands in 2017–18 ACB

Team	Home city	Arena	Capacity
Delteco GBC	San Sebastián	Donostia Arena	11,000
Divina Seguros Joventut	Badalona	Palau Municipal d'Esports	8,500
FC Barcelona Lassa	Barcelona	Palau Blaugrana	7,585
Herbalife Gran Canaria	Las Palmas	Gran Canaria Arena	9,870
Iberostar Tenerife	San Cristóbal de La Laguna	Santiago Martín	5,003
Kirolbet Baskonia	Vitoria-Gasteiz	Fernando Buesa Arena	15,504
Monbus Obradoiro	Santiago de Compostela	Multiusos Fontes do Sar	5,060
Montakit Fuenlabrada	Fuenlabrada	Fernando Martín	5,100
MoraBanc Andorra	Andorra la Vella	Poliesportiu d'Andorra	5,000
Movistar Estudiantes	Madrid	WiZink Center	15,000
Real Betis Energía Plus	Seville	San Pablo	7,626
Real Madrid	Madrid	WiZink Center	15,000
RETAbet Bilbao Basket	Bilbao	Bilbao Arena	10,014
San Pablo Burgos	Burgos	Coliseum Burgos	9,352
Tecnyconta Zaragoza	Zaragoza	Pabellón Príncipe Felipe	10,744
UCAM Murcia	Murcia	Palacio de Deportes	7,341
Unicaja	Málaga	Martín Carpena	11,300
Valencia Basket	Valencia	Fuente de San Luis	8,500

=== Personnel and sponsorship ===
Team	Head coach	Captain	Kit manufacturer	Shirt sponsor
Delteco GBC	(Spain) Porfirio Fisac	(Spain) Xabi Oroz	Hummel	Delteco
Divina Seguros Joventut	(Spain) Carles Duran	(Spain) Albert Ventura	Spalding	Divina Pastora Seguros
FC Barcelona Lassa	(Serbia) Svetislav Pešić	(Spain) Juan Carlos Navarro	Nike	Lassa Tyres
Herbalife Gran Canaria	(Spain) Luis Casimiro	(Dominican Republic) Eulis Báez	Adidas	Herbalife
Iberostar Tenerife	(Greece) Fotios Katsikaris	(Argentina) Nicolás Richotti	Austral	Iberostar
Kirolbet Baskonia	(Spain) Pedro Martínez	(Georgia (country)) Tornike Shengelia	Kelme	Kirolbet
Monbus Obradoiro	(Spain) Moncho Fernández	(Spain) Pepe Pozas	Vive	Estrella Galicia 0,0
Montakit Fuenlabrada	(Argentina) Néstor García	(Croatia) Marko Popović	BFS	Montakit
MoraBanc Andorra	(Spain) Joan Peñarroya	(Serbia) Oliver Stević	Kon	MoraBanc, Andorra
Movistar Estudiantes	(Spain) Salva Maldonado	(Senegal) Sitapha Savané	Joma	Movistar
Real Betis Energía Plus	(Spain) Javier Carrasco	(Spain) Alfonso Sánchez	Spalding	Energía Plus
Real Madrid	(Spain) Pablo Laso	(Spain) Felipe Reyes	Adidas	European University
RETAbet Bilbao Basket	(Slovenia) Jaka Lakovič	(Spain) Álex Mumbrú	Erreà	RETAbet
San Pablo Burgos	(Spain) Diego Epifanio	(Spain) Javi Vega	Hummel	Inmobiliaria San Pablo, Burgos
Tecnyconta Zaragoza	(Spain) Pep Cargol	(Spain) Tomás Bellas	Mercury	Tecnyconta
UCAM Murcia	(Spain) Ibon Navarro	(Spain) José Ángel Antelo	Nike	UCAM, Caravaca
Unicaja	(Spain) Joan Plaza	(Spain) Carlos Suárez	Spalding	Unicaja, Málaga
Valencia Basket	(Spain) Txus Vidorreta	(Spain) Rafa Martínez	Luanvi	Cultura del Esfuerzo^{1}

Notes
1. Cultura del Esfuerzo (transl. "Culture of Effort") is the motto of the club.

=== Managerial changes ===
Team	Outgoing manager	Manner of departure	Date of vacancy	Position in table	Replaced with	Date of appointment
Tecnyconta Zaragoza	(Spain) Luis Guil	End of contract	16 May 2017	Pre-season	(Spain) Jota Cuspinera	16 June 2017
FC Barcelona Lassa	(Greece) Georgios Bartzokas	Sacked	7 June 2017	Pre-season	(Spain) Sito Alonso	16 June 2017
Montakit Fuenlabrada	(Spain) Jota Cuspinera	Resigned	7 June 2017	Pre-season	(Argentina) Néstor García	7 July 2017
Kirolbet Baskonia	(Spain) Sito Alonso	Mutual consent	16 June 2017	Pre-season	(Argentina) Pablo Prigioni	16 June 2017
Valencia Basket	(Spain) Pedro Martínez	End of contract	20 June 2017	Pre-season	(Spain) Txus Vidorreta	20 June 2017
Iberostar Tenerife	(Spain) Txus Vidorreta	Resigned	20 June 2017	Pre-season	(Bosnia and Herzegovina) Nenad Marković	20 June 2017
UCAM Murcia	(Greece) Fotios Katsikaris	Signed for Hapoel Jerusalem	28 June 2017	Pre-season	(Spain) Ibon Navarro	29 June 2017
Kirolbet Baskonia	(Argentina) Pablo Prigioni	Resigned	26 October 2017	11th (2–3)	(Spain) Pedro Martínez	27 October 2017
Real Betis Energía Plus	(Spain) Alejandro Martínez	Sacked	30 October 2017	17th (0–6)	(Spain) Óscar Quintana	2 November 2017
Iberostar Tenerife	(Bosnia and Herzegovina) Nenad Marković	Sacked	24 November 2017	12th (4–5)	(Greece) Fotios Katsikaris	24 November 2017
RETAbet Bilbao Basket	(Spain) Carles Duran	Sacked	27 November 2017	16th (3–6)	(Croatia) Veljko Mršić	27 November 2017
Tecnyconta Zaragoza	(Spain) Jota Cuspinera	Mutual consent	30 January 2018	16th (5–13)	(Spain) Pep Cargol	22 February 2018 (Note: Initially as caretaker.)
FC Barcelona Lassa	(Spain) Sito Alonso	Sacked	4 February 2018	3rd (12–7)	(Serbia) Svetislav Pešić	9 February 2018
Divina Seguros Joventut	(Spain) Diego Ocampo	Sacked	7 February 2018	17th (4–15)	(Spain) Carles Duran	7 February 2018
Real Betis Energía Plus	(Spain) Óscar Quintana	Sacked	17 April 2018	17th (7–21)	(Spain) Javier Carrasco	17 April 2018
RETAbet Bilbao Basket	(Croatia) Veljko Mršić	Sacked	30 April 2018	17th (8–22)	(Slovenia) Jaka Lakovič	30 April 2018

== Regular season ==
=== League table ===
Pos	Team	Pld	W	L	PF	PA	PD	Qualification or relegation
1	Real Madrid	34	30	4	3052	2678	+374	Qualification to playoffs
2	Kirolbet Baskonia	34	25	9	2946	2668	+278	Qualification to playoffs
3	FC Barcelona Lassa	34	24	10	3030	2691	+339	Qualification to playoffs
4	Valencia Basket	34	22	12	2809	2582	+227	Qualification to playoffs
5	Herbalife Gran Canaria	34	20	14	2851	2780	+71	Qualification to playoffs
6	MoraBanc Andorra	34	19	15	2898	2787	+111	Qualification to playoffs
7	Unicaja	34	19	15	2778	2631	+147	Qualification to playoffs
8	Iberostar Tenerife	34	19	15	2684	2614	+70	Qualification to playoffs
9	Montakit Fuenlabrada	34	17	17	2641	2806	−165	
10	UCAM Murcia	34	17	17	2624	2589	+35	
11	Movistar Estudiantes	34	17	17	2861	2892	−31	
12	Monbus Obradoiro	34	14	20	2650	2742	−92	
13	Delteco GBC	34	13	21	2742	2854	−112	
14	San Pablo Burgos	34	13	21	2775	2961	−186	
15	Divina Seguros Joventut	34	12	22	2709	2831	−122	
16	Tecnyconta Zaragoza	34	10	24	2780	3006	−226	
17	RETAbet Bilbao Basket (R)	34	8	26	2592	2843	−251	Relegation to LEB Oro
18	Real Betis Energía Plus (R)	34	7	27	2629	3096	−467	Relegation to LEB Oro

Source: ACB
(R) Relegated

=== Positions by round ===
The table lists the positions of teams after completion of each round. In order to preserve chronological evolvements, any postponed matches are not included in the round at which they were originally scheduled, but added to the full round they were played immediately afterwards. For example, if a match is scheduled for round 13, but then postponed and played between rounds 16 and 17, it will be added to the standings for round 16.

Team \ Round	1	2	3	4	5	6	7	8	9	10	11	12	13	14	15	16	17	18	19	20	21	22	23	24	25	26	27	28	29	30	31	32	33	34
Real Madrid	6	5	1	2	1	1	1	1	1	1	1	1	1	1	1	1	1	1	1	1	1	1	1	1	1	1	1	1	1	1	1	1	1	1
Kirolbet Baskonia	11	9	10	14	11	13	12	10	7	7	5	5	5	5	5	7	6	5	5	3	4	4	4	2	2	2	2	2	2	2	2	2	2	2
FC Barcelona Lassa	8	7	2	1	3	4	3	3	2	2	2	4	4	2	2	2	3	2	3	4	2	2	2	3	3	3	3	3	3	3	3	3	3	3
Valencia Basket	3	2	4	6	6	2	2	2	3	3	3	2	3	3	4	3	2	3	2	2	3	3	3	4	4	4	4	4	4	4	4	4	4	4
Herbalife Gran Canaria	5	6	3	5	4	6	4	6	6	6	6	6	6	7	6	6	9	7	7	6	6	6	8	5	5	7	8	6	7	6	5	5	5	5
MoraBanc Andorra	12	13	15	13	14	14	16	15	9	12	10	10	10	9	9	10	10	10	9	8	8	8	7	8	6	6	6	7	6	7	7	7	7	6
Unicaja	4	1	7	4	7	5	7	7	8	8	8	9	9	8	7	5	5	4	4	5	5	5	6	7	8	5	5	5	5	5	6	6	6	7
Iberostar Tenerife	1	3	8	7	5	7	8	9	12	9	9	7	7	6	8	8	7	8	8	9	9	9	9	9	9	9	10	10	10	8	8	8	8	8
Montakit Fuenlabrada	2	4	5	3	2	3	5	5	5	5	4	3	2	4	3	4	4	6	6	7	7	7	5	6	7	8	9	9	9	10	10	10	10	9
UCAM Murcia	16	15	11	10	12	9	11	13	11	10	11	11	11	10	10	9	8	9	10	11	11	10	11	10	10	10	7	8	8	9	9	9	9	10
Movistar Estudiantes	9	12	14	12	9	11	9	11	13	14	12	13	12	12	13	12	13	13	13	12	13	13	13	13	11	11	11	11	11	11	11	11	11	11
Monbus Obradoiro	7	10	9	11	8	8	6	4	4	4	7	8	8	11	11	13	11	11	11	10	10	11	10	11	12	12	13	13	13	13	12	12	12	12
Delteco GBC	14	8	6	8	10	12	15	12	15	11	13	14	13	13	12	11	12	12	12	13	12	12	12	12	13	13	12	12	12	12	13	13	13	13
San Pablo Burgos	18	17	18	18	18	18	18	17	17	17	17	17	17	18	17	16	15	15	16	16	16	16	16	16	16	15	14	14	14	14	14	14	14	14
Divina Seguros Joventut	10	11	13	15	16	16	14	16	14	15	15	12	14	16	16	17	17	17	17	17	18	18	18	18	18	18	18	17	15	15	15	15	15	15
Tecnyconta Zaragoza	13	14	16	16	15	15	10	8	10	13	14	15	15	15	14	15	16	16	14	14	14	14	14	14	14	14	15	15	16	16	16	16	16	16
RETAbet Bilbao Basket	17	16	12	9	13	10	13	14	16	16	16	16	16	14	15	14	14	14	15	15	15	15	15	15	15	16	16	16	17	17	17	17	17	17
Real Betis Energía Plus	15	18	17	17	17	17	17	18	18	18	18	18	18	17	18	18	18	18	18	18	17	17	17	17	17	17	17	18	18	18	18	18	18	18

Source: ACB

=== Results ===
Home \ Away	GBC	JOV	FCB	HGC	IBT	BKN	OBR	FUE	MBA	MOV	BET	RMB	RBB	SPA	TZA	UCM	UNI	VLC
Delteco GBC	—	92–87	77–101	80–87	89–70	72–84	107–99	81–76	60–64	101–91	94–60	84–98	87–91	63–71	94–99	67–69	71–63	77–95
Divina Seguros Joventut	76–67	—	72–74	92–91	73–76	61–75	62–63	95–87	103–101	93–96	81–76	66–84	84–56	81–88	94–83	62–71	85–78	77–75
FC Barcelona Lassa	89–74	91–79	—	77–88	91–93	87–82	102–58	101–74	94–70	95–100	121–56	94–72	90–58	111–81	100–84	94–97	73–76	79–74
Herbalife Gran Canaria	84–76	94–69	77–93	—	68–76	100–82	82–64	87–65	99–95	99–95	83–90	88–78	90–85	87–80	90–70	83–71	76–55	87–78
Iberostar Tenerife	88–92	77–75	86–81	92–71	—	86–74	73–69	83–75	69–78	77–59	87–70	74–84	83–69	84–76	100–94	84–78	81–77	67–70
Kirolbet Baskonia	88–86	87–77	96–72	91–66	100–94	—	85–78	95–63	88–75	94–76	94–70	69–81	94–71	102–82	73–78	87–85	96–78	78–74
Monbus Obradoiro	69–72	77–68	73–76	79–65	75–64	77–83	—	78–81	65–77	112–116	89–70	93–102	70–69	94–69	80–74	70–68	91–97	96–77
Montakit Fuenlabrada	84–70	83–78	75–93	66–86	79–68	80–75	65–73	—	77–85	87–81	91–94	75–90	82–68	69–79	88–82	88–86	77–69	61–76
MoraBanc Andorra	94–81	88–81	102–92	78–76	58–48	94–97	93–96	94–95	—	78–65	96–68	89–87	99–91	91–99	100–77	90–70	66–60	87–69
Movistar Estudiantes	75–92	101–94	80–70	88–75	97–92	87–89	95–67	69–71	81–72	—	89–83	75–92	96–84	100–76	84–74	79–91	57–72	73–71
Real Betis Energía Plus	88–94	86–81	82–89	76–77	62–109	62–106	83–77	70–73	89–100	81–90	—	63–98	86–94	96–101	70–67	87–102	89–88	80–90
Real Madrid	87–75	87–70	80–84	96–72	89–76	101–89	78–65	100–72	94–88	96–89	104–89	—	95–65	96–81	93–65	87–85	99–85	83–71
RETAbet Bilbao Basket	71–74	99–74	83–104	92–78	67–74	74–78	74–84	77–83	72–82	87–77	93–79	80–87	—	62–78	77–72	73–82	70–67	77–81
San Pablo Burgos	76–99	79–80	101–103	89–98	65–81	76–100	86–77	69–71	92–86	72–87	92–88	95–100	90–86	—	96–88	89–86	78–85	76–90
Tecnyconta Zaragoza	97–73	86–92	86–99	95–99	89–77	74–98	93–87	102–108	95–78	102–97	81–78	81–96	81–61	73–79	—	73–77	77–102	74–97
UCAM Murcia	83–69	75–92	55–61	84–78	74–72	78–67	60–62	82–62	81–77	71–77	63–70	61–63	82–71	67–64	84–73	—	64–74	91–93
Unicaja	114–88	86–74	80–78	94–87	72–62	72–73	96–76	82–86	87–86	89–70	99–71	88–89	93–78	93–72	82–83	78–67	—	74–67
Valencia Basket	86–64	102–81	70–71	89–83	74–61	81–77	80–67	88–72	89–87	93–69	103–67	82–86	87–67	87–78	103–58	73–84	74–73	—

Source: ACB
Legend: Blue = home team win; Red = away team win.

== Playoffs ==
Quarterfinals
1 Real Madrid	83	84
8 Iberostar Tenerife	73	75
4 Valencia Basket	71	70	89
5 Herbalife Gran Canaria	56	97	92
2 Kirolbet Baskonia	87	80
7 Unicaja	70	64
3 FC Barcelona Lassa	76	85	91
6 MoraBanc Andorra	94	81	71

Semifinals
1 Real Madrid	88	92	99
5 Herbalife Gran Canaria	70	83	92
2 Kirolbet Baskonia	86	85	65	88
3 FC Barcelona Lassa	61	79	67	82

Finals
1 Real Madrid	90	98	83	96
2 Kirolbet Baskonia	94	91	78	85

== Final standings ==
Pos	Team	Pld	W	L	Qualification or relegation
1	Real Madrid (C)	43	38	5	Qualification to EuroLeague (Note: Real Madrid, Kirolbet Baskonia and FC Barcelona Lassa were already qualified to EuroLeague.)
2	Kirolbet Baskonia	44	31	13	Qualification to EuroLeague
3	FC Barcelona Lassa	41	27	14	Qualification to EuroLeague
4	Herbalife Gran Canaria	40	22	18	Qualification to EuroLeague
5	Valencia Basket	37	23	14	Qualification to EuroCup
6	MoraBanc Andorra	37	20	17	Qualification to EuroCup
7	Unicaja	36	19	17	Qualification to EuroCup
8	Iberostar Tenerife	36	19	17	Qualification to Champions League regular season
9	Montakit Fuenlabrada	34	17	17	Qualification to Champions League regular season
10	UCAM Murcia	34	17	17	Qualification to Champions League third qualifying round
11	Movistar Estudiantes	34	17	17	Qualification to Champions League first qualifying round
12	Monbus Obradoiro	34	14	20	
13	Delteco GBC	34	13	21	
14	San Pablo Burgos	34	13	21	
15	Divina Seguros Joventut	34	12	22	
16	Tecnyconta Zaragoza	34	10	24	
17	RETAbet Bilbao Basket (R)	34	8	26	Relegation to LEB Oro
18	Real Betis Energía Plus (R)	34	7	27	Relegation to LEB Oro

Source: ACB
(C) Champions; (R) Relegated

== Attendances ==
Attendances include playoff games:

Pos	Team	Total	High	Low	Average	Change
1	Kirolbet Baskonia	224,265	15,512	8,102	10,194	+4.5%
2	San Pablo Burgos	154,196	9,352	8,531	9,070	+353.5%^{1}
3	RETAbet Bilbao Basket	148,786	9,842	7,803	8,752	+0.5%
4	Real Madrid	188,844	12,114	4,108	8,584	−5.4%
5	Movistar Estudiantes	138,552	13,513	4,674	8,150	−2.5%
6	Tecnyconta Zaragoza	130,275	9,489	5,821	7,663	+2.6%
7	Valencia Basket	137,835	8,500	5,600	7,254	−11.1%
8	Unicaja	130,290	9,863	5,871	7,238	+1.7%
9	Herbalife Gran Canaria	111,434	6,978	4,176	5,865	−9.3%
10	UCAM Murcia	94,818	7,098	5,089	5,578	−1.0%
11	Montakit Fuenlabrada	87,960	5,646	4,026	5,174	+5.4%
12	Divina Seguros Joventut	84,758	8,597	3,486	4,986	+0.2%
13	Monbus Obradoiro	84,698	5,705	4,213	4,982	−1.7%
14	FC Barcelona Lassa	100,600	6,438	3,053	4,790	+12.1%
15	Iberostar Tenerife	83,882	5,176	3,738	4,660	+3.1%
16	MoraBanc Andorra	76,032	5,000	3,620	4,224	−0.1%
17	Real Betis Energía Plus	70,661	6,723	1,315	4,157	−14.9%
18	Delteco GBC	53,869	5,118	1,495	3,169	n/a^{1}
	League total	2,101,755	15,512	1,315	6,427	−0.4%

Source: ACB
Notes:
1: Team played last season in LEB Oro.

== Awards ==
All official awards of the 2017–18 ACB season.

=== MVP ===
Pos.	Player	Team
PG	(Slovenia) Luka Dončić	Real Madrid

=== Finals MVP ===
Pos.	Player	Team
SF	(Spain) Rudy Fernández	Real Madrid

=== All-ACB Teams ===
Pos.	First Team		Second Team	
Pos.	Player	Team	Player	Team
PG	(Slovenia) Luka Dončić	Real Madrid	(Argentina) Facundo Campazzo	Real Madrid
SG	(United States) Gary Neal	Tecnyconta Zaragoza	(France) Thomas Heurtel	FC Barcelona Lassa
SF	(United States) Sylven Landesberg	Movistar Estudiantes	(Poland) Mateusz Ponitka	Iberostar Tenerife
PF	(Georgia (country)) Tornike Shengelia	Kirolbet Baskonia	(Montenegro) Bojan Dubljević	Valencia Basket
C	(Netherlands) Henk Norel	Delteco GBC	(Croatia) Ante Tomić	FC Barcelona Lassa

=== Best Young Player Award ===
Pos.	Player	Team
PG	(Slovenia) Luka Dončić	Real Madrid

=== Best All-Young Team ===
Pos.	Player	Team
PG	(Slovenia) Luka Dončić	Real Madrid
SG	(Spain) Sergi García	Valencia Basket/Tecnyconta Zaragoza
SF	(Spain) Xabier López-Arostegui	Divina Seguros Joventut
PF	(Spain) Jonathan Barreiro	Tecnyconta Zaragoza
C	(Sweden) Simon Birgander	Divina Seguros Joventut

=== El Corte Inglés Top Scorer ===
Pos.	Player	Team
SG	(United States) Gary Neal	Tecnyconta Zaragoza

=== KIA Most Spectacular Player ===
Pos.	Player	Team
SF	(Democratic Republic of the Congo) Christian Eyenga	Montakit Fuenlabrada

=== Best Coach ===
Coach	Team
(Spain) Pablo Laso	Real Madrid

=== Player of the round ===
Round	Player	Team	PIR
1	(United States) Sylven Landesberg	Movistar Estudiantes	33
2	(Netherlands) Henk Norel	Delteco GBC	36
3	(Netherlands) Henk Norel (2)	Delteco GBC	30
4	(Poland) Mateusz Ponitka	Iberostar Tenerife	34
5	(Georgia (country)) Tornike Shengelia	Kirolbet Baskonia	33
6	(Serbia) Dejan Todorović	RETAbet Bilbao Basket	28
7	(Spain) Felipe Reyes	Real Madrid	26
7	(Azerbaijan) Nik Caner-Medley	Movistar Estudiantes	26
8	(United States) Gary Neal	Tecnyconta Zaragoza	32
9	(Montenegro) Nemanja Radović	Monbus Obradoiro	29
10	(Spain) Fernando San Emeterio	Valencia Basket	42
11	(Poland) Mateusz Ponitka (2)	Iberostar Tenerife	38
12	(Spain) Rafa Martínez	Valencia Basket	26
12	(Serbia) Dejan Todorović (2)	RETAbet Bilbao Basket	26
13	(United States) Ryan Kelly	Real Betis Energía Plus	29
14	(Slovenia) Luka Dončić	Real Madrid	33
15	(Serbia) Nikola Dragović	Tecnyconta Zaragoza	33
16	(United States) Deon Thompson	San Pablo Burgos	31
17	(Georgia (country)) Tornike Shengelia (2)	Kirolbet Baskonia	34
18	(Canada) Kenny Chery	Delteco GBC	28
19	(United States) Gary Neal (2)	Tecnyconta Zaragoza	33
20	(United States) Gary Neal (3)	Tecnyconta Zaragoza	45
21	(Cape Verde) Edy Tavares	Real Madrid	27
22	(Serbia) Nemanja Nedović	Unicaja	37
23	(France) Thomas Heurtel	FC Barcelona Lassa	37
24	(Croatia) Ante Tomić	FC Barcelona Lassa	35
25	(United States) Sylven Landesberg (2)	Movistar Estudiantes	52
26	(Finland) Petteri Koponen	FC Barcelona Lassa	30
27	(Argentina) Lucio Redivo	RETAbet Bilbao Basket	38
28	(Argentina) Nicolás Laprovittola	Divina Seguros Joventut	31
29	(Spain) Rudy Fernández	Real Madrid	28
30	(Georgia (country)) Tornike Shengelia (3)	Kirolbet Baskonia	41
31	(Argentina) Nicolás Laprovittola (2)	Divina Seguros Joventut	34
32	(United States) Gary Neal (4)	Tecnyconta Zaragoza	39
33	(Slovenia) Luka Dončić (2)	Real Madrid	42
34	(Spain) Ferrán Bassas	Iberostar Tenerife	33

=== Player of the month ===
Month	Week	Player	Team	PIR	Ref
October	1–6	(Netherlands) Henk Norel	Delteco GBC	24.2	
November	7–9	(United States) Gary Neal	Tecnyconta Zaragoza	22	
December	10–14	(Slovenia) Luka Dončić	Real Madrid	24	
January	15–18	(Senegal) Clevin Hannah	UCAM Murcia	21	
February	19–20	(United States) Gary Neal	Tecnyconta Zaragoza	39	
March	21–24	(Croatia) Ante Tomić	FC Barcelona Lassa	23.8	
April	25–30	(United States) Gary Neal	Tecnyconta Zaragoza	23.8	
May	30–34	(Argentina) Nicolás Laprovíttola	Divina Seguros Joventut	22.0	

== ACB clubs in European competitions ==
Team	Competition	Progress	Ref
Real Madrid	EuroLeague	Champions	
Kirolbet Baskonia	EuroLeague	7th qualified	
Unicaja	EuroLeague	9th qualified	
Valencia Basket	EuroLeague	11th qualified	
FC Barcelona Lassa	EuroLeague	13th qualified	
Herbalife Gran Canaria	EuroCup	Quarterfinals	
MoraBanc Andorra	EuroCup	Regular season	
RETAbet Bilbao Basket	EuroCup	Regular season	
UCAM Murcia	Champions League	Third place	
Iberostar Tenerife	Champions League	Round of 16	
Movistar Estudiantes	Champions League	Regular season	
Divina Seguros Joventut	Champions League	Second qualifying round	
