= 2005 ACB Playoffs =

The 2005 ACB Playoffs was the postseason of the 2004–05 ACB season. Consisting of 8 teams best classified, the playoffs involved over a two weeks of play and more than 20 games overall. The playoffs were conducted in 3-game series, with the team with the better record holding home court advantage. Real Madrid won the 2005 ACB Playoffs by defeating the defending champions, TAU Cerámica, 3–2 in the ACB Finals.

Note: winner is noted in bold.

== Quarter finals ==
(1) TAU Cerámica vs. (8) Gran Canaria: TAU Vitoria win series 3-1

- **Game 1** @ Vitoria: **TAU Vitoria 90**, Gran Canaria 61
- **Game 2** @ Gran Canaria: **Gran Canaria 72**, TAU Vitoria 64
- **Game 3** @ Vitoria: **TAU Vitoria 75**, Gran Canaria 64
- **Game 4** @ Gran Canaria: Gran Canaria 66, **TAU Vitoria 68**

(4) Unicaja Málaga vs. (5) Etosa Alicante: Unicaja win series 3-2

- **Game 1** @ Malaga: Unicaja Malaga 60, **Etosa Alicante 65**
- **Game 2** @ Alicante: **Etosa Alicante 94**, Unicaja Malaga 75
- **Game 3** @ Malaga: **Unicaja Malaga 81**, Etosa Alicante 74
- **Game 4** @ Alicante: Etosa Alicante 56, **Unicaja Malaga 60**
- **Game 5** @ Malaga: **Unicaja Malaga 71**, Etosa Alicante 69

(2) Real Madrid vs. (7) DKV Joventut: Real Madrid win series 3-1

- **Game 1** @ Madrid: **Real Madrid 74**, Joventut Badalona 71
- **Game 2** @ Badalona: **Joventut Badalona 79**, Real Madrid 66
- **Game 3** @ Madrid: **Real Madrid 90**, Joventut Badalona 70
- **Game 4** @ Badalona: Joventut Badalona 72, **Real Madrid 81**

(6) Adecco Estudiantes vs. (3) Winterthur FC Barcelona: Adecco Estudiantes win series 3-1

- **Game 1** @ Barcelona: Winterthur Barcelona 73, **Adecco Estudiantes 74**
- **Game 2** @ Madrid: **Adecco Estudiantes 78**, Winterthur 57
- **Game 3** @ Barcelona: **Winterthur Barcelona 83**, Adecco Estudiantes 79
- **Game 4** @ Madrid: **Adecco Estudiantes 81**, Winterthur Barcelona 63

== Semi finals ==
(1) TAU Cerámica vs. (4) Unicaja Málaga: TAU Vitoria win series 3-1

- **Game 1** @ Vitoria: **TAU Vitoria 72**, Unicaja Malaga 63
- **Game 2** @ Vitoria: **TAU Vitoria 64**, Unicaja Malaga 53
- **Game 3** @ Malaga: **Unicaja Malaga 95**, TAU Vitoria 92
- **Game 4** @ Malaga: Unicaja Malaga 62, **TAU Vitoria 74**

(2) Real Madrid vs. (6) Adecco Estudiantes: Real Madrid wins series 3-1

- **Game 1** @ Madrid (Home RM): **Real Madrid 81**, Adecco Estudiantes 64
- **Game 2** @ Madrid (Home RM): Real Madrid 67, **Adecco Estudiantes 89**
- **Game 3** @ Madrid (Home AE): Adecco Estudiantes 84, **Real Madrid 85**
- **Game 4** @ Madrid (Home AE): Adecco Estudiantes 68, **Real Madrid 74**

== ACB Finals ==
(2) Real Madrid vs. (1) TAU Cerámica: Real Madrid win series 3-2

- **Game 1** @ Vitoria: TAU Vitoria 82, **Real Madrid 84**
- **Game 2** @ Vitoria: **TAU Vitoria 74**, Real Madrid 68
- **Game 3** @ Madrid: Real Madrid 82, **TAU Vitoria 83**
- **Game 4** @ Madrid: **Real Madrid 88**, TAU Vitoria 82
- **Game 5** @ Vitoria: TAU Vitoria 69, **Real Madrid 70**

REAL MADRID: 2004/2005 ACB CHAMPION

MVP: (United States) Louis Bullock

The Finals were broadcast in Spain on RTVE. For a list of international broadcasters see the acb international TV site.
