= Villamayor de Calatrava =

- Municipality
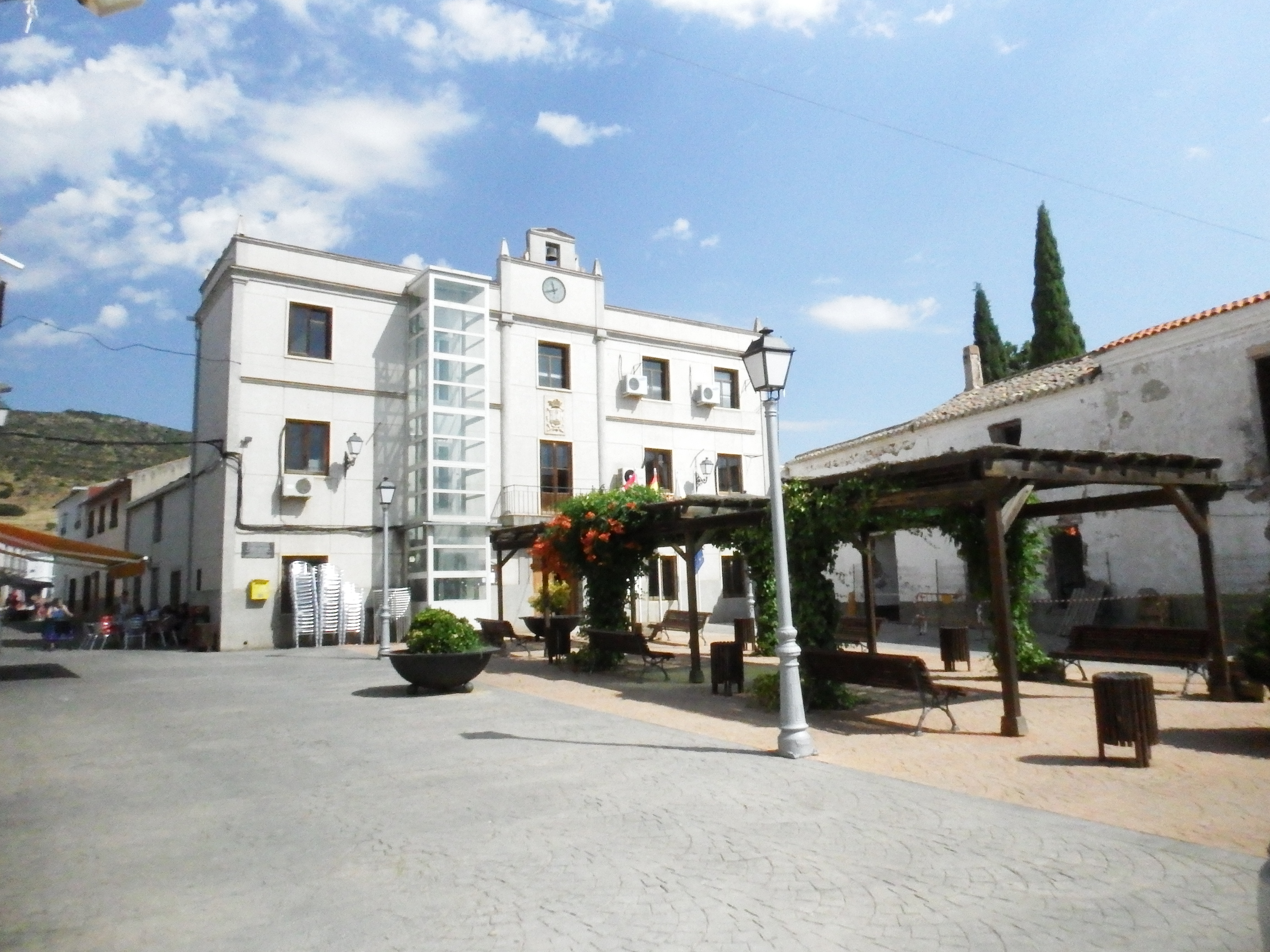
- Villamayor de Calatrava Town Hall

- Coat of arms

- Location of Villamayor de Calatrava. Villamayor de Calatrava (Castilla-La Mancha)
- Coordinates: 38°47′N 4°08′W
- Country: Spain
- Community: Castile-La Mancha
- Province: Ciudad Real
- Comarca: Campo de Calatrava

Government
  - Mayor: Juan Antonio Callejas Cano (PP)

Area
  - Total: 144.81 km^{2} (55.91 sq mi)

Population (2023)
  - Total: 638
  - Density: 4.41/km^{2} (11.4/sq mi)
- Time zone: UTC+1 (CET)
  - Summer (DST): UTC+2 (CEST)
- Postal code: 13595
- Website: www.villamayordecalatrava.es

Villamayor de Calatrava is a municipality in Ciudad Real, Castile-La Mancha, Spain. It has a population of 638.
