= 2026 ACB Playoffs =

Spanish basketball postseason tournament

Tournament details
- Country: Spain
- Dates: 2–24 June 2026
- Teams: 8
- Defending champions: Real Madrid

Final positions
- Champions: Valencia Basket; 2nd ACB title 2nd Spanish title
- Runners-up: Barça
- Semifinalists: Asisa Joventut; La Laguna Tenerife

Tournament statistics
- Matches played: 21
- Attendance: 185,039 (8,811 per match)

The 2026 ACB Playoffs, also known as 2026 Liga Endesa Playoffs for sponsorship reasons, was the postseason tournament of the ACB's 2025–26 season, which began on 4 October 2025. The playoffs started on June 2 and ended on June 24.

Real Madrid was the defending champion which was knocked out in quarterfinals by La Laguna Tenerife in a stunning upset led to the first trophyless season since the 2010–11 season for Los Blancos. Valencia Basket achieved their second ACB and Spanish title after nine years of their last league title.

== Format ==
At the end of the regular season, the eight teams with the most wins qualify for the playoffs. The seedings are based on each team's record.

The bracket is fixed; there is no reseeding. The quarterfinals are best-of-three series; the team that wins two games advances to the next round. This round is in a 1–1–1 format. From the semifinals onward, the rounds are best-of-five series; the team that wins three games advances to the next round. These rounds, including the Finals, are in a 2–2–1 format. Home court advantage in any round belong to the higher-seeded team.

== Playoff qualifying ==
On April 12, 2026, Real Madrid became the first team to clinch a playoff spot.

Seed	Team	Record	Clinched		
Seed	Team	Record	Playoff berth	Seeded team	Top seed
1	Real Madrid	26–8	April 12	May 3	May 3
2	Valencia Basket	25–9	May 2	May 31	–
3	Kosner Baskonia	25–9	May 10	May 29	–
4	UCAM Murcia	25–9	May 2	May 29	–
5	Barça	24–10	May 9	–	–
6	Asisa Joventut	22–12	May 20	–	–
7	Surne Bilbao	19–15	May 29	–	–
8	La Laguna Tenerife	18–16	May 26	–	–

== Bracket ==
Teams in bold advanced to the next round. The numbers to the left of each team indicate the team's seeding, the numbers to the right indicate the result of games including result in bold of the team that won in that game, and the numbers furthest to the right indicate the number of games the team won in that round.

Quarterfinals
**2**	**Valencia Basket**	**83**	**88**	**2**
7	Surne Bilbao	80	71	0
3	Kosner Baskonia	**85**	63	88	1
**6**	**Asisa Joventut**	71	**82**	**96**	**2**
4	UCAM Murcia	68	**90**	76	1
**5**	**Barça**	**91**	87	**100**	**2**
1	Real Madrid	97	**118**	95	1
**8**	**La Laguna Tenerife**	**98**	83	**107**	**2**

Semifinals
**2**	**Valencia Basket**	**118**	**90**	**87**	**3**
6	Asisa Joventut	117	76	75	0
**5**	**Barça**	**100**	**97**	**85**	**3**
8	La Laguna Tenerife	67	89	76	0

Finals
**2**	**Valencia Basket**	112	**102**	**88**	**108**	**3**
5	Barça	**113**	75	80	84	1

== Quarterfinals ==
All times are in Central European Summer Time (UTC+02:00)

=== Real Madrid v La Laguna Tenerife ===
2 June 2026	Real Madrid	97–**98** (Series: **0–1**)	**La Laguna Tenerife**	Madrid
21:00	Scoring by quarter: **26**–21, 24–**27**, **25**–23, 22–**27**
	Pts: Lyles 15; Rebs: Deck 7 Asts: three players 3 PIR: Feliz 18	Boxscore	Pts: Fernández, Van Beck 17; Rebs: Abromaitis 5 Asts: Huertas 9 PIR: Fernández 18	Arena: Movistar Arena; Attendance: 7,827; Referees: Emilio Pérez Pizarro, Sergio Manuel, Igor Esteve

4 June 2026	La Laguna Tenerife	83–**118** (Series: **1–1**)	**Real Madrid**	San Cristóbal de La Laguna
21:00	Scoring by quarter: **24**–21, 21–**30**, 20–**34**, 18–**33**
	Pts: Mills 21; Rebs: Scrubb 6 Asts: Huertas 3 PIR: Mills 19	Boxscore	Pts: Hezonja 20; Rebs: Hezonja, Sissoko 7 Asts: Campazzo 8 PIR: Hezonja 30	Arena: Santiago Martín; Attendance: 5,100; Referees: Óscar Perea, Alberto Sánchez Sixto, Vicente Martínez

6 June 2026	Real Madrid	95–**107** (Series: **1–2**)	**La Laguna Tenerife**	Madrid
18:00	Scoring by quarter: **24**–23, 21–**26**, **28**–21, 22–**37**
	Pts: Hezonja 22; Rebs: Lyles 11; Asts: Maledon 4 PIR: Hezonja 21	Boxscore	Pts: Mills 29; Rebs: Yebo 7 Asts: Fernández 6 PIR: Yebo 28	Arena: Movistar Arena; Attendance: 9,034; Referees: Antonio Conde, Fernando Calatrava, Joaquín García

Regular season series
Tied 1–1 in the regular season series

7 December 2025

Boxscore

La Laguna Tenerife	70–**71**	**Real Madrid**

Santiago Martín, San Cristóbal de La Laguna

19 April 2026

Boxscore

Real Madrid	90–**95**	**La Laguna Tenerife**

Movistar Arena, Madrid

This was the second playoff meeting between these two teams, with Real Madrid winning the previous meeting.

Previous playoff series
Madrid leads 1–0 in all-time playoff series

2018

**Real Madrid**	**2**–0	Iberostar Tenerife

2018 Quarterfinals

=== Valencia Basket v Surne Bilbao ===
3 June 2026	**Valencia Basket**	**83**–80 (Series: **1–0**)	Surne Bilbao	Valencia
19:00	Scoring by quarter: 18–**19**, **17**–16, 20–**27**, **28**–18
	Pts: Key, Montero 17; Rebs: Sako 10; Asts: Cárdenas, Montero 4 PIR: Montero 26	Boxscore	Pts: Frey, Hlinason 12; Rebs: Hlinason 8 Asts: Pantzar 6 PIR: Hlinason 19	Arena: Roig Arena; Attendance: 10,776; Referees: Jordi Aliaga, Francisco Araña, Juan de Dios Oyón

5 June 2026	Surne Bilbao	71–**88** (Series: **0–2**)	**Valencia Basket**	Bilbao
19:00	Scoring by quarter: 16–**22**, 21–**25**, 12–**24**, **22**–17
	Pts: Krampelj 11; Rebs: Hlinason 10; Asts: Pantzar 4 PIR: Hlinason 19	Boxscore	Pts: Taylor 15; Rebs: Sako 8 Asts: Montero 6 PIR: Reuvers, Sako 18	Arena: Bilbao Arena; Attendance: 9,556; Referees: Martín Caballero, Alfonso Olivares, Andrés Fernández

Regular season series
Valencia won 2–0 in the regular season series

2 January 2026

Boxscore

Surne Bilbao	72–**116**	**Valencia Basket**

Bilbao Arena, Bilbao

17 May 2026

Boxscore

**Valencia Basket**	**88**–83	Surne Bilbao

Roig Arena, Valencia

This was the third playoff meeting between these two teams, with each team winning each one out of the first two meetings.

Previous playoff series
Tied 1–1 in all-time playoff series

2011

Power Electronics Valencia	0–**2**	**Bizkaia Bilbao Basket**

2011 Quarterfinals

2015

Dominion Bilbao Basket	1–**2**	**Valencia Basket**

2015 Quarterfinals

=== Kosner Baskonia v Asisa Joventut ===
3 June 2026	**Kosner Baskonia**	**85**–71 (Series: **1–0**)	Asisa Joventut	Vitoria-Gasteiz
21:00	Scoring by quarter: 18–18, **20**–19, 21–**23**, **26**–11
	Pts: Omoruyi 13; Rebs: Kurucs, Spagnolo 5 Asts: Forrest 4 PIR: Omoruyi 17	Boxscore	Pts: Rubio 15; Rebs: Birgander 11; Asts: Rubio 4 PIR: Birgander 18	Arena: Buesa Arena; Attendance: 8,666; Referees: Carlos Peruga, Jorge Martínez, Fabio Fernández

5 June 2026	**Asisa Joventut**	**82**–63 (Series: **1–1**)	Kosner Baskonia	Badalona
21:00	Scoring by quarter: **25**–14, **19**–17, **18**–12, 20–20
	Pts: Hunt 27; Rebs: Ružić 8 Asts: Hunt 3 PIR: Hunt 27	Boxscore	Pts: Forrest 15; Rebs: Kurucs 9 Asts: Kurucs 5 PIR: Diakite 12	Arena: Palau Municipal d'Esports; Attendance: 7,587; Referees: Carlos Cortés, Luis Castillo, Raúl Zamorano

7 June 2026	Kosner Baskonia	88–**96** (Series: **1–2**)	**Asisa Joventut**	Vitoria-Gasteiz
19:00	Scoring by quarter: **24**–23, 14–**18**, 25–**30**, 25–25
	Pts: Simmons 18; Rebs: Kurucs 10; Asts: Diakite 6 PIR: Diakite 23	Boxscore	Pts: Rubio 23; Rebs: Birgander 6 Asts: Parker, Rubio 4 PIR: Rubio 28	Arena: Buesa Arena; Attendance: 12,247; Referees: Carlos Peruga, Martín Caballero, Alfonso Olivares

Regular season series
Tied 1–1 in the regular season series

25 January 2026

Boxscore

**Kosner Baskonia**	**87**–77	Asisa Joventut

Buesa Arena, Vitoria-Gasteiz

18 April 2026

Boxscore

**Asisa Joventut**	**81**–69	Kosner Baskonia

Palau Municipal d'Esports, Badalona

This was the fifth playoff meeting between these two teams, with Asisa Joventut winning three of the first four meetings.

Previous playoff series
Joventut leads 3–1 in all-time playoff series

1991

**Montigalá Joventut**	**3**–1	Taugrés

1991 Semifinals

1997

**Festina Joventut**	**3**–1	Taugrés

1997 Quarterfinals

2004

**TAU Cerámica**	**3**–0	DKV Joventut

2004 Quarterfinals

2023

Cazoo Baskonia	0–**2**	**Joventut Badalona**

2023 Quarterfinals

=== UCAM Murcia v Barça ===
2 June 2026	UCAM Murcia	68–**91** (Series: **0–1**)	**Barça**	Murcia
19:00	Scoring by quarter: 14–**16**, 16–**30**, **22**–20, 16–**25**
	Pts: Martin 12; Rebs: Radebaugh 8 Asts: Radebaugh 4 PIR: Radebaugh 17	Boxscore	Pts: Brizuela 18; Rebs: Cale 7 Asts: Brizuela 5 PIR: Brizuela, Veselý 17	Arena: Palacio de Deportes; Attendance: 5,824; Referees: Antonio Conde, Arnau Padrós, Javier Torres

4 June 2026	Barça	87–**90** (Series: **1–1**)	**UCAM Murcia**	Barcelona
19:00	Scoring by quarter: 18–**22**, **22**–21, **26**–24, 21–**23**
	Pts: Shengelia 18; Rebs: Shengelia 7 Asts: Satoranský 4 PIR: Shengelia 22	Boxscore	Pts: DeJulius 22; Rebs: Raieste 8 Asts: DeJulius 5 PIR: DeJulius 26	Arena: Palau Blaugrana; Attendance: 4,982; Referees: Fernando Calatrava, Rafael Serrano, Alberto Baena

6 June 2026	UCAM Murcia	76–**100** (Series: **1–2**)	**Barça**	Murcia
21:00	Scoring by quarter: 17–**27**, 19–**25**, 25–**27**, 15–**21**
	Pts: Forrest 20; Rebs: Cacok 5 Asts: Radebaugh 5 PIR: Radebaugh 20	Boxscore	Pts: Clyburn 23; Rebs: Fall 7 Asts: Shengelia 4 PIR: Clyburn 28	Arena: Palacio de Deportes; Attendance: 7,114; Referees: Emilio Pérez Pizarro, Alberto Sánchez Sixto, Óscar Perea

Regular season series
Murcia won 2–0 in the regular season series

2 November 2025

Boxscore

Barça	78–**81**	**UCAM Murcia**

Palau Blaugrana, Barcelona

1 February 2026

Boxscore

**UCAM Murcia**	**84**–83	Barça

Palacio de Deportes, Murcia

This was the first playoff meeting between UCAM Murcia and Barça.

== Semifinals ==
All times are in Central European Summer Time (UTC+02:00)

=== Barça v La Laguna Tenerife ===
9 June 2026	**Barça**	**100**–67 (Series: **1–0**)	La Laguna Tenerife	Barcelona
20:00	Scoring by quarter: **19**–11, **27**–16, **26**–21, **28**–19
	Pts: Brizuela 18; Rebs: Shengelia 7 Asts: Laprovíttola 6 PIR: Shengelia 24	Boxscore	Pts: Yebo 16; Rebs: Yebo 6 Asts: Mills 5 PIR: Yebo 12	Arena: Palau Blaugrana; Attendance: 4,571; Referees: Carlos Peruga, Rafael Serrano, Javier Torres

11 June 2026	**Barça**	**97**–89 (Series: **2–0**)	La Laguna Tenerife	Barcelona
20:00	Scoring by quarter: 25–**27**, **23**–11, 21–**25**, **28**–26
	Pts: Veselý 19; Rebs: Fall, Shengelia 6 Asts: Brizuela, Satoranský 3 PIR: Veselý 23	Boxscore	Pts: Mills 36; Rebs: Guerra 6 Asts: Huertas 8 PIR: Mills 37	Arena: Palau Blaugrana; Attendance: 5,985; Referees: Carlos Cortés, Jorge Martínez, Sergio Manuel

13 June 2026	La Laguna Tenerife	76–**85** (Series: **0–3**)	**Barça**	San Cristóbal de La Laguna
20:00	Scoring by quarter: 19–19, **23**–15, 16–**22**, 18–**29**
	Pts: Huertas 17; Rebs: Yebo 6 Asts: Huertas 6 PIR: Huertas 18	Boxscore	Pts: Clyburn 19; Rebs: Clyburn 7 Asts: Laprovíttola, Satoranský 3 PIR: Clyburn 21	Arena: Santiago Martín; Attendance: 5,100; Referees: Antonio Conde, Luis Castillo, Alberto Sánchez Sixto

Regular season series
Tied 1–1 in the regular season series

25 January 2026

Boxscore

Barça	82–**89**	**La Laguna Tenerife**

Palau Blaugrana, Barcelona

17 May 2026

Boxscore

La Laguna Tenerife	97–**102**	**Barça**

Santiago Martín, San Cristóbal de La Laguna

This was the third playoff meeting between these two teams, with Barça winning the previous two meetings.

Previous playoff series
Barça leads 2–0 in all-time playoff series

2021

**Barça**	**2**–1	Lenovo Tenerife

2021 Semifinals

2024

**Barça**	**2**–0	Lenovo Tenerife

2024 Quarterfinals

=== Valencia Basket v Asisa Joventut ===
10 June 2026	**Valencia Basket**	**118**–117(OT) (Series: **1–0**)	Asisa Joventut	Valencia
20:00	Scoring by quarter: **26**–22, 25–**32**, **28**–24, 26–**27**, Overtime: **13**–12
	Pts: Montero 27; Rebs: Taylor 11; Asts: Montero 8 PIR: Montero, Taylor 31	Boxscore	Pts: Rubio 22; Rebs: Ružić 7 Asts: Rubio 11; PIR: Rubio 33	Arena: Roig Arena; Attendance: 12,910; Referees: Emilio Pérez Pizarro, Jordi Aliaga, Joaquín García

12 June 2026	**Valencia Basket**	**90**–76 (Series: **2–0**)	Asisa Joventut	Valencia
20:00	Scoring by quarter: **30**–13, 26–**30**, **21**–16, 13–**17**
	Pts: Badio 16; Rebs: Key 6 Asts: Montero 4 PIR: Sako 15	Boxscore	Pts: Parker 16; Rebs: Hanga 7 Asts: six players 2 PIR: Parker 14	Arena: Roig Arena; Attendance: 13,730; Referees: Óscar Perea, Arnau Padrós, Fabio Fernández

14 June 2026	Asisa Joventut	75–**87** (Series: **0–3**)	**Valencia Basket**	Badalona
20:00	Scoring by quarter: 18–**20**, 21–21, 16–**23**, 20–**23**
	Pts: Rubio 17; Rebs: Kraag, Ružić 6 Asts: Hunt 6 PIR: Rubio 19	Boxscore	Pts: Montero 24; Rebs: Montero 8 Asts: Montero 7 PIR: Montero 39	Arena: Palau Municipal d'Esports; Attendance: 10,142; Referees: Fernando Calatrava, Martín Caballero, Alfonso Olivares

Regular season series
Tied 1–1 in the regular season series

26 October 2025

Boxscore

**Valencia Basket**	**102**–90	Asisa Joventut

Roig Arena, Valencia

8 February 2026

Boxscore

**Asisa Joventut**	**90**–87	Valencia Basket

Palau Municipal d'Esports, Badalona

This was the second playoff meeting between these two teams, with Valencia Basket winning the previous meeting.

Previous playoff series
Valencia leads 1–0 in all-time playoff series

2003

**Pamesa Valencia**	**3**–0	DKV Joventut

2003 Quarterfinals

== Finals ==
All times are in Central European Summer Time (UTC+02:00)

18 June 2026	Valencia Basket	112–**113**(OT) (Series: **0–1**)	**Barça**	Valencia
20:00	Scoring by quarter: **25**–13, 27–**34**, 20–**28**, **29**–26, Overtime: 11–**12**
	Pts: Montero 24; Rebs: Pradilla 7 Asts: Montero 7 PIR: Montero 29	Boxscore	Pts: Clyburn 21; Rebs: Veselý 6 Asts: Laprovíttola 7 PIR: Laprovíttola 25	Arena: Roig Arena; Attendance: 14,423; Referees: Antonio Conde, Martín Caballero, Luis Castillo

20 June 2026	**Valencia Basket**	**102**–75 (Series: **1–1**)	Barça	Valencia
20:00	Scoring by quarter: **26**–11, 19–**27**, **29**–14, **28**–23
	Pts: Montero 19; Rebs: Pradilla 7 Asts: Montero 6 PIR: Montero 27	Boxscore	Pts: Parra 16; Rebs: Cale, Hernangómez 6 Asts: Brizuela 5 PIR: Laprovíttola 15	Arena: Roig Arena; Attendance: 14,865; Referees: Emilio Pérez Pizarro, Fernando Calatrava, Arnau Padrós

22 June 2026	Barça	80–**88** (Series: **1–2**)	**Valencia Basket**	Barcelona
20:00	Scoring by quarter: **17**–15, 19–**25**, 21–**31**, **23**–17
	Pts: Shengelia 25; Rebs: Clyburn, Shengelia 6 Asts: three players 3 PIR: Shengelia 30	Boxscore	Pts: Montero 29; Rebs: Key 8 Asts: Montero 6 PIR: Montero 37	Arena: Palau Blaugrana; Attendance: 7,190; Referees: Carlos Peruga, Óscar Perea, Rafael Serrano

24 June 2026	Barça	84–**108** (Series: **1–3**)	**Valencia Basket**	Barcelona
20:00	Scoring by quarter: 23–**26**, 12–**21**, 29–**35**, 20–**26**
	Pts: Punter 26; Rebs: Veselý 8 Asts: Shengelia 5 PIR: Punter 27	Boxscore	Pts: Montero 23; Rebs: Key, Pradilla 6 Asts: three players 3 PIR: Montero 28	Arena: Palau Blaugrana; Attendance: 7,410; Referees: Antonio Conde, Martín Caballero, Alfonso Olivares

Regular season series
Valencia won 2–0 in the regular season series

5 October 2025

Boxscore

**Valencia Basket**	**93**–81	Barça

Roig Arena, Valencia

31 May 2026

Boxscore

Barça	77–**102**	**Valencia Basket**

Palau Blaugrana, Barcelona

This was the seventh playoff meeting between these two teams, with Barça winning five of the first six meetings.

Previous playoff series
Barça leads 5–1 in all-time playoff series

2003

**FC Barcelona**	**3**–0	Pamesa Valencia

2003 Finals

2009

**Regal FC Barcelona**	**2**–0	Pamesa Valencia

2009 Quarterfinals

2012

**FC Barcelona Regal**	**3**–1	Valencia Basket

2012 Semifinals

2014

Valencia Basket	2–**3**	**FC Barcelona**

2014 Semifinals

2017

**Valencia Basket**	**2**–1	FC Barcelona Lassa

2017 Quarterfinals

2023

**Barça**	**2**–0	Valencia Basket

2023 Quarterfinals
