= EuroBasket 2022 final =

EuroBasket 2022 Final
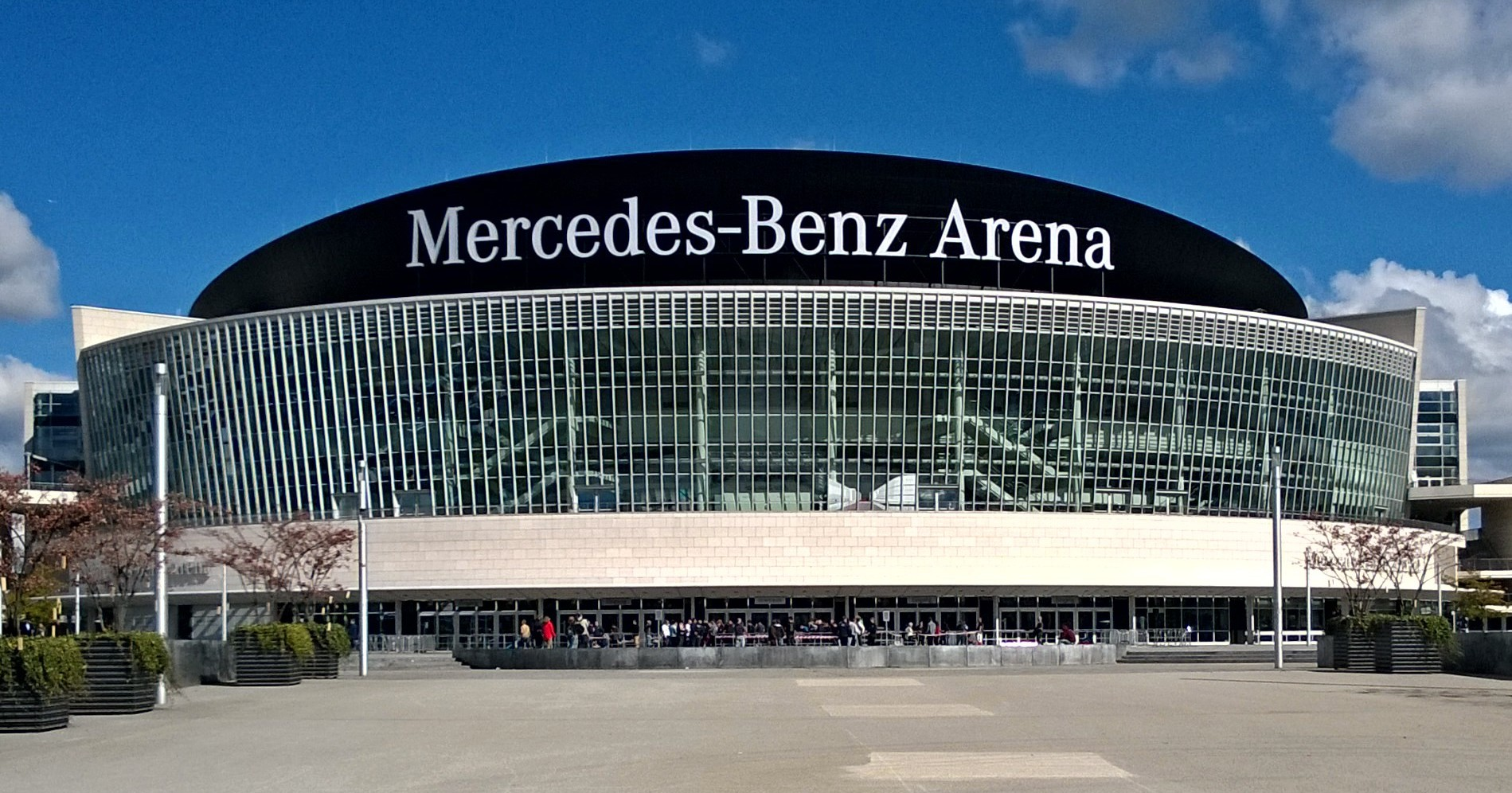
- The Mercedes-Benz Arena hosts the Final
Spain	France
(Spain)	(France)
88	76
	1	2	3	4	Total
Spain	23	24	19	22	88
France	14	23	20	19	76
- Date: 18 September 2022
- Venue: Mercedes-Benz Arena, Berlin
- Referees: Ademir Zurapović (BIH); Boris Krejić (SLO); Mārtiņš Kozlovskis (LAT)
- Attendance: 13,042

The EuroBasket 2022 Final was the championship game of the EuroBasket 2022 tournament. The game took place on 18 September 2022 in the Mercedes-Benz Arena, Berlin.

The game featured Spain and France and was a re-match of the EuroBasket 2011 Final in Kaunas, when Spain won convincingly.

Spain won the game, achieving their fourth Eurobasket title in the last six tournaments.

== Road to the final ==
Spain		Round	France	
Opponent	Result		Opponent	Result
Bulgaria	114–87	Game 1	Germany	63–76
Georgia	90–64	Game 2	Lithuania	77–73
Belgium	73–83	Game 3	Hungary	78–74
Montenegro	82–65	Game 4	Bosnia and Herzegovina	81–68
Turkey	72–69	Game 5	Slovenia	82–88
Pos / Team / Pld / Pts; 1 / Spain / 5 / 9; 2 / Turkey / 5 / 8; 3 / Montenegro / 5 / 8; 4 / Belgium / 5 / 8; 5 / Bulgaria / 5 / 6; 6 / Georgia (H) / 5 / 6; Source: FIBA (H) Hosts		Preliminary Round	Pos / Team / Pld / Pts; 1 / Slovenia / 5 / 9; 2 / Germany (H) / 5 / 9; 3 / France / 5 / 8; 4 / Lithuania / 5 / 7; 5 / Bosnia and Herzegovina / 5 / 7; 6 / Hungary / 5 / 5; Source: FIBA (H) Hosts	
Opponent	Result	Knockout stage	Opponent	Result
Lithuania	102–94 (OT)	Round of 16	Turkey	87–86 (OT)
Finland	100–90	Quarterfinals	Italy	93–85 (OT)
Germany	96–91	Semifinals	Poland	95–54

== Match details ==
18 September 2022	Spain	88–76	France	Mercedes-Benz Arena, Berlin
20:30	Scoring by quarter: 23–14, 24–23, 19–20, 22–19
	Pts: J. Hernangómez 27; Rebs: W. Hernangómez 8 Asts: Brown 11	Boxscore	Pts: Fournier 23; Rebs: Tarpey 9 Asts: Heurtel 7	Attendance: 13,042; Referees: Ademir Zurapović (BIH), Boris Krejić (SLO), Mārtiņš Kozlovskis (LAT)

Spain	France

Starters:			Pts	Reb	Ast
PG	2	Lorenzo Brown	14	0	11
F/C	4	Jaime Pradilla	0	3	0
SF	6	Xabier López-Arostegui	0	4	2
G	7	Jaime Fernández	13	0	2
C	14	Willy Hernangómez	14	8	0
Reserves:					
G	5	Rudy Fernández	7	1	0
SG	8	Darío Brizuela	3	0	2
G	9	Alberto Díaz	8	0	3
C	11	Sebas Saiz	0	0	0
F/C	16	Usman Garuba	2	2	4
F	41	Juancho Hernangómez	27	5	0
PF	44	Joel Parra	0	0	0
Head coach:
(Italy) Sergio Scariolo

2022 European champions

Spain
4th title

Starters:			Pts	Reb	Ast
PF	7	Guerschon Yabusele	13	2	6
G/F	10	Evan Fournier	23	3	2
PG	21	Andrew Albicy	1	0	0
SF	22	Terry Tarpey	4	9	2
C	27	Rudy Gobert	6	6	1
Reserves:					
G	0	Élie Okobo	9	3	1
PF	2	Amath M'Baye	DNP		
G/F	3	Timothé Luwawu-Cabarrot	0	1	0
PG	4	Thomas Heurtel	16	0	7
PG	11	Théo Maledon	DNP		
C	17	Vincent Poirier	4	1	1
C	93	Moustapha Fall	0	1	0
Head coach:
(France) Vincent Collet

== Rosters ==
=== Spain ===
The squad was announced on 30 August 2022.

Spain men's national basketball team – EuroBasket 2022 roster
Players
Coaches

Pos.	No.	Name	Age – Date of birth	Height	Club	Ctr.
G	2	Lorenzo Brown	32 – 26 August 1990	1.96 m (6 ft 5 in)	Maccabi Tel Aviv	(Israel)
F/C	4	Jaime Pradilla	21 – 3 January 2001	2.05 m (6 ft 9 in)	Valencia	(Spain)
G/F	5	Rudy Fernández (C)	37 – 4 April 1985	1.96 m (6 ft 5 in)	Real Madrid	(Spain)
SF	6	Xabier López-Arostegui	25 – 19 May 1997	2.01 m (6 ft 7 in)	Valencia	(Spain)
G	7	Jaime Fernández	29 – 4 June 1993	1.86 m (6 ft 1 in)	Tenerife	(Spain)
SG	8	Darío Brizuela	27 – 8 November 1994	1.88 m (6 ft 2 in)	Unicaja	(Spain)
G	9	Alberto Díaz	28 – 23 April 1994	1.91 m (6 ft 3 in)	Unicaja	(Spain)
C	11	Sebas Saiz	28 – 15 July 1994	2.05 m (6 ft 9 in)	Alvark	(Japan)
C	14	Willy Hernangómez	28 – 27 May 1994	2.09 m (6 ft 10 in)	New Orleans Pelicans	(United States)
F/C	16	Usman Garuba	20 – 9 March 2002	2.03 m (6 ft 8 in)	Houston Rockets	(United States)
F	41	Juancho Hernangómez	26 – 28 September 1995	2.05 m (6 ft 9 in)	Toronto Raptors	(Canada)
PF	44	Joel Parra	22 – 4 April 2000	2.00 m (6 ft 7 in)	Joventut	(Spain)

Head coach

- (Italy) Sergio Scariolo

Assistant coach(es)

- (Spain) Luis Guil
- (Spain) Ángel Sánchez-Cañete

Legend

- (C) Team captain
- Club – describes last club
  before the tournament
- Age – describes age
  on 1 September 2022

=== France ===
The squad was announced on 31 August 2022.

France men's national basketball team – EuroBasket 2022 roster
Players
Coaches

Pos.	No.	Name	Age – Date of birth	Height	Club	Ctr.
G	0	Élie Okobo	24 – 23 October 1997	1.90 m (6 ft 3 in)	Monaco	(Monaco)
PF	2	Amath M'Baye	32 – 14 December 1989	2.06 m (6 ft 9 in)	Anadolu Efes	(Turkey)
G/F	3	Timothé Luwawu-Cabarrot	27 – 9 May 1995	1.98 m (6 ft 6 in)	Atlanta Hawks	(United States)
PG	4	Thomas Heurtel	33 – 10 April 1989	1.88 m (6 ft 2 in)	Real Madrid	(Spain)
PF	7	Guerschon Yabusele	26 – 17 December 1995	2.03 m (6 ft 8 in)	Real Madrid	(Spain)
G/F	10	Evan Fournier (C)	29 – 29 October 1992	1.99 m (6 ft 6 in)	New York Knicks	(United States)
PG	11	Théo Maledon	21 – 12 June 2001	1.91 m (6 ft 3 in)	Oklahoma City Thunder	(United States)
C	17	Vincent Poirier	28 – 17 October 1993	2.13 m (7 ft 0 in)	Real Madrid	(Spain)
PG	21	Andrew Albicy	32 – 21 March 1990	1.78 m (5 ft 10 in)	Gran Canaria	(Spain)
SF	22	Terry Tarpey	28 – 2 March 1994	1.96 m (6 ft 5 in)	Le Mans	(France)
C	27	Rudy Gobert	30 – 26 June 1992	2.15 m (7 ft 1 in)	Minnesota Timberwolves	(United States)
C	93	Moustapha Fall	30 – 23 February 1992	2.18 m (7 ft 2 in)	Olympiacos	(Greece)

Head coach

- (France) Vincent Collet

Assistant coach(es)

- (France) Pascal Donnadieu
- (France) Laurent Foirest

Legend

- (C) Team captain
- Club – describes last club
  before the tournament
- Age – describes age
  on 1 September 2022
