= 2025–26 ACB season =

Spanish professional basketball season

Liga Endesa^{1}
- Season: 2025–26
- Matches played: 327
- Teams: 18

Regular season
- Top seed: Real Madrid
- Season MVP: (Croatia) Mario Hezonja
- Relegated: Dreamland Gran Canaria; Coviran Granada

Finals
- Champions: Valencia Basket; 2nd ACB title 2nd Spanish title
- Runners-up: Barça
- Semi-finalists: Asisa Joventut; La Laguna Tenerife
- Finals MVP: (Dominican Republic) Jean Montero

Statistical leaders
Points	(France) Timothé Luwawu-Cabarrot	18.1
Rebounds	(Iceland) Tryggvi Hlinason	6.8
Assists	(Guinea) Shannon Evans	5.5
Index Rating	(Croatia) Luka Božić	24.3

Records
- Biggest home win: Baskonia 130–85 Manresa (18 January 2026)
- Biggest away win: Bilbao 72–116 Valencia (2 January 2026)
- Highest scoring: Real Madrid 131–123 Murcia (3 May 2026)
- Winning streak: Real Madrid (12 matches)
- Losing streak: Coviran Granada (15 matches)
- Highest attendance: 15,068; Valencia 82–96 Real Madrid (25 April 2026)
- Lowest attendance: 2,732; Andorra 75–107 Valencia (15 February 2026)
- Attendance: 2,268,020 (6,936 per match)
- ^{1} Sponsored league name, referring to Endesa.

The 2025–26 ACB season, also known as Liga Endesa for sponsorship reasons, was the 43rd season of the top Spanish professional basketball league, since its establishment in 1983. It started on 4 October 2025 with the regular season and ended on 24 June 2026 with the finals.

Real Madrid was the defending champion which was knocked out in quarterfinals by La Laguna Tenerife in a stunning upset led to the first trophyless season since the 2010–11 season for Los Blancos. Valencia Basket achieved their second ACB and Spanish title after nine years of their last league title.

== Teams ==
=== Promotion and relegation (pre-season) ===
A total of 18 teams contested the league, including 17 sides from the 2024–25 season and one promoted from the 2024–25 Primera FEB.

On 23 April 2025, Recoletas Salud San Pablo Burgos became the first team to clinch the promotion to ACB after an 87–74 win to Flexicar Fuenlabrada with three rounds before the end of the regular season. It is the sixth season of the team of the city of Burgos after its previous spell between 2017 and 2022 in the Spanish top tier. On 8 June 2025, Real Betis Baloncesto became the second team to achieve the promotion to ACB after winning the Primera FEB Final Four in an 97–92 win after an overtime drama against Flexicar Fuenlabrada to clinch the last spot to ACB. However, on 24 July 2025, the ACB rejected the membership of Real Betis Baloncesto after it did not fulfill the requirements to register the team in the league.

The first team to be relegated from ACB was Leyma Coruña, after a 67–79 loss to Surne Bilbao Basket on 11 May 2025, after only a single season stay in the top flight just one year later that clinched the promotion to the top tier in a season that became the first promoted team in 20 years to defeat Spanish powerhouses Real Madrid and Barça in its debut season. The second team to be relegated to Primera FEB was Coviran Granada, after a 67–79 win in the next-to-last round against Real Madrid on 25 May 2025, after three seasons in the top tier, that has not been able to repeat the achievements of the previous two seasons in that avoided the relegation in the last round. However, on 24 July 2025, the ACB issued an invitation to Coviran Granada after Real Betis Baloncesto did not fulfill the requirements to join the league.

▲ Promoted from Primera FEB	▼ Relegated to Primera FEB
Recoletas Salud San Pablo Burgos; ~~Real Betis Baloncesto~~ (Note: It did not fulfill the requirements to register the team in the league.)	~~Coviran Granada~~ (Note: It achieved a vacant berth after Real Betis Baloncesto did not fulfill the requirements to join the league.); Leyma Coruña

=== Venues and locations ===
Location of teams in 2025–26 ACB

Team	Home city	Arena	Capacity
Asisa Joventut	Badalona	Palau Municipal d'Esports	12,760
Barça	Barcelona	Palau Blaugrana	7,786
Bàsquet Girona	Girona	Fontajau	5,500
Baxi Manresa	Manresa	Nou Congost	5,000
Casademont Zaragoza	Zaragoza	Pabellón Príncipe Felipe	10,744
Coviran Granada	Granada	Palacio de Deportes	8,100
Dreamland Gran Canaria	Las Palmas	Gran Canaria Arena	9,870
Hiopos Lleida	Lleida	Espai Fruita Barris Nord	6,100
Kosner Baskonia	Vitoria-Gasteiz	Buesa Arena	15,504
La Laguna Tenerife	San Cristóbal de La Laguna	Santiago Martín	5,100
MoraBanc Andorra	Andorra la Vella	Pavelló Toni Martí	5,001
Real Madrid	Madrid	Movistar Arena	13,109
Recoletas Salud San Pablo Burgos	Burgos	Coliseum Burgos	9,604
Río Breogán	Lugo	Pazo dos Deportes	5,310
Surne Bilbao	Bilbao	Bilbao Arena	10,014
UCAM Murcia	Murcia	Palacio de Deportes	7,454
Unicaja	Málaga	Martín Carpena	10,699
Valencia Basket	Valencia	Roig Arena	15,600

=== Personnel and kits ===
Team	Head coach	Captain	Kit manufacturer	Shirt sponsor (chest)
Asisa Joventut	(Spanish Basketball Federation) Dani Miret	(Croatia) Ante Tomić	Joma	Asisa
Barça	(Spanish Basketball Federation) Xavi Pascual	(Czech Republic) Tomáš Satoranský	Nike	Assistència Sanitària
Bàsquet Girona	(Spanish Basketball Federation) Moncho Fernández	(Spain) Sergi Martínez	Puma	FIATC
Baxi Manresa	(Spanish Basketball Federation) Diego Ocampo	(Spain) Dani Pérez	Pentex	Baxi Climatización
Casademont Zaragoza	(Spanish Basketball Federation) Gonzalo García de Vitoria	(Spain) Santiago Yusta	Mercury	Casademont
Coviran Granada	(Spanish Basketball Federation) Arturo Ruiz	(Spain) Pere Tomàs	Vive	Coviran
Dreamland Gran Canaria	(Argentine Basketball Confederation) Néstor García	(France) Andrew Albicy	Spalding	Dreamland, Gran Canaria
Hiopos Lleida	(Spanish Basketball Federation) Gerard Encuentra	(Spain) Oriol Paulí	Pentex	Hiopos
Kosner Baskonia	(Italian Basketball Federation) Paolo Galbiati	(Lithuania) Tadas Sedekerskis	Puma	Kingroyal Media, Kosner
La Laguna Tenerife	(Spanish Basketball Federation) Txus Vidorreta	(Brazil) Marcelo Huertas	Austral	La Laguna, Tenerife
MoraBanc Andorra	(Croatian Basketball Federation) Žan Tabak	(Brazil) Rafa Luz	Kappa	MoraBanc, Andorra
Real Madrid	(Italian Basketball Federation) Sergio Scariolo	(Spain) Sergio Llull	Adidas	Emirates
Recoletas Salud San Pablo Burgos	(Spanish Basketball Federation) Porfirio Fisac	(Spain) Dani Díez	Givova	Inmobiliaria San Pablo, Burgos
Río Breogán	(Spanish Basketball Federation) Luis Casimiro	(Spain) Erik Quintela	Adidas	Estrella Galicia 0,0
Surne Bilbao	(Spanish Basketball Federation) Jaume Ponsarnau	(Iceland) Tryggvi Hlinason	Hummel	Surne Seguros & Pensiones
UCAM Murcia	(Spanish Basketball Federation) Sito Alonso	(Montenegro) Jonah Radebaugh	Nike	UCAM
Unicaja	(Spanish Basketball Federation) Ibon Navarro	(Spain) Alberto Díaz	Joma	Unicaja, Málaga
Valencia Basket	(Spanish Basketball Federation) Pedro Martínez	(Spain) Josep Puerto	Luanvi	

=== Coaching changes ===
Team	Outgoing coach	Manner of departure	Date of vacancy	Position in table	Incoming coach	Date of appointment
Coviran Granada	(Spanish Basketball Federation) Pablo Pin	End of contract	12 June 2025	Pre-season	(Spanish Basketball Federation) Ramón Díaz	21 June 2025
Real Madrid	(Spanish Basketball Federation) Chus Mateo	Sacked	3 July 2025	Pre-season	(Italian Basketball Federation) Sergio Scariolo	3 July 2025
Casademont Zaragoza	(Spanish Basketball Federation) Rodrigo San Miguel	End of interim period	11 July 2025	Pre-season	(Spanish Basketball Federation) Jesús Ramírez	11 July 2025
Kosner Baskonia	(Spanish Basketball Federation) Pablo Laso	Sacked	8 August 2025	Pre-season	(Italian Basketball Federation) Paolo Galbiati	8 August 2025
Barça	(Spanish Basketball Federation) Joan Peñarroya	Sacked	9 November 2025	11th (2–4)	(Spanish Basketball Federation) Xavi Pascual	13 November 2025
San Pablo Burgos	(Italian Basketball Federation) Bruno Savignani	Sacked	8 December 2025	18th (1–8)	(Spanish Basketball Federation) Porfirio Fisac	8 December 2025
Coviran Granada	(Spanish Basketball Federation) Ramón Díaz	Resigned	4 January 2026	18th (1–13)	(Spanish Basketball Federation) Arturo Ruiz	5 January 2026
MoraBanc Andorra	(Spanish Basketball Federation) Joan Plaza	Sacked	26 January 2026	16th (4–13)	(Croatian Basketball Federation) Žan Tabak	26 January 2026
Casademont Zaragoza	(Spanish Basketball Federation) Jesús Ramírez	Sacked	15 February 2026	15th (6–14)	(Spanish Basketball Federation) Joan Plaza	17 February 2026
Dreamland Gran Canaria	(Basketball Federation of Slovenia) Jaka Lakovič	Sacked	8 April 2026	15th (7–18)	(Argentine Basketball Confederation) Néstor García	8 April 2026
Casademont Zaragoza	(Spanish Basketball Federation) Joan Plaza	Sacked	17 May 2026	16th (9–22)	(Spanish Basketball Federation) Gonzalo García de Vitoria (interim)	17 May 2026

== Regular season ==
=== League table ===
Pos	Team	Pld	W	L	PF	PA	PD	Qualification or relegation
1	Real Madrid	34	26	8	3160	2906	+254	Qualification to playoffs
2	Valencia Basket	34	25 (Note: Head–to–head record: Valencia Basket 2–2 (+14), Kosner Baskonia 2–2 (+2), UCAM Murcia 2–2 (−16).)	9	3218	2829	+389	Qualification to playoffs
3	Kosner Baskonia	34	25	9	3177	2950	+227	Qualification to playoffs
4	UCAM Murcia	34	25	9	3113	2876	+237	Qualification to playoffs
5	Barça	34	24	10	3046	2815	+231	Qualification to playoffs
6	Asisa Joventut	34	22	12	2906	2766	+140	Qualification to playoffs
7	Surne Bilbao	34	19	15	2884	2924	−40	Qualification to playoffs
8	La Laguna Tenerife	34	18	16	3040	2940	+100	Qualification to playoffs
9	Unicaja	34	17	17	2978	2956	+22	
10	Baxi Manresa	34	16	18	2932	3080	−148	
11	Río Breogán	34	15	19	3094	3171	−77	
12	Bàsquet Girona	34	14	20	2913	3024	−111	
13	Recoletas Salud San Pablo Burgos	34	12 (Note: Head–to–head record: Recoletas Salud San Pablo Burgos 1–1 (+7), Hiopos Lleida 1–1 (−7).)	22	3049	3152	−103	
14	Hiopos Lleida	34	12	22	2856	3097	−241	
15	Casademont Zaragoza	34	10 (Note: Head–to–head record: Casademont Zaragoza 3–1 (+31), MoraBanc Andorra 2–2 (−17), Dreamland Gran Canaria 1–3 (−14).)	24	2962	3176	−214	
16	MoraBanc Andorra	34	10	24	2976	3169	−193	
17	Dreamland Gran Canaria	34	10	24	2764	2932	−168	Relegation to Primera FEB
18	Coviran Granada	34	6	28	2848	3153	−305	Relegation to Primera FEB

Source: ACB
Rules for classification: 1) Win–loss record; 2) Head–to–head record; 3) Head–to–head point difference; 4) Point difference; 5) Points scored; 6) Sum of quotients of points scored (Note: Head–to–head record is used only after all the matches between the teams in question have been played)

=== Results ===
Home \ Away	JOV	BAR	GIR	BAX	CAZ	COV	DGC	HIO	BKN	LLT	MBA	RMB	BUR	BRE	SBB	UCM	UNI	VBC
Asisa Joventut	—	84–72	71–74	83–79	89–86	109–73	92–84	82–68	81–69	78–67	101–79	75–80	86–79	83–75	101–69	67–89	95–74	90–87
Barça	90–80	—	97–92	97–60	100–80	108–71	91–69	86–91	91–83	82–89	102–71	76–95	91–76	100–85	90–61	78–81	97–91	77–102
Bàsquet Girona	82–77	96–78	—	74–79	90–81	82–76	85–81	103–86	85–96	89–96	82–75	93–95	77–71	103–80	89–93	71–93	83–90	81–84
Baxi Manresa	87–77	62–89	95–97	—	101–83	83–68	80–87	99–86	83–88	86–80	91–84	94–87	94–101	104–99	79–77	86–90	92–98	104–102
Casademont Zgz	67–79	86–92	90–94	83–95	—	74–85	95–84	107–91	107–88	76–84	107–89	83–95	108–98	84–88	82–84	90–100	79–86	86–98
Coviran Granada	75–87	98–101	84–91	92–79	83–92	—	83–90	92–89	80–83	96–109	89–86	100–111	90–107	64–83	84–88	79–86	83–71	85–79
Dreamland GC	78–92	61–72	100–90	80–87	74–78	90–85	—	50–68	75–97	102–83	102–85	80–82	95–109	75–83	97–98	77–72	72–81	80–90
Hiopos Lleida	86–88	90–80	81–93	90–99	77–87	99–90	75–72	—	86–80	103–101	88–116	81–88	73–72	87–68	90–81	71–107	88–89	78–99
Kosner Baskonia	87–77	92–95	94–81	130–85	115–88	121–85	88–86	93–90	—	89–79	99–92	105–100	89–77	112–84	110–91	87–80	92–89	89–91
La Laguna TFE	98–100	97–102	97–94	104–93	99–76	80–75	70–71	87–94	89–85	—	89–90	70–71	101–97	90–81	82–87	96–80	95–79	89–71
MoraBanc And	76–83	95–100	115–113	104–94	113–111	86–81	94–78	79–87	79–88	64–96	—	85–90	83–85	101–104	98–102	89–95	98–74	75–107
Real Madrid	81–89	100–105	112–76	87–75	99–78	94–79	81–71	95–78	83–88	90–95	97–90	—	90–80	97–101	82–70	131–123	91–82	94–79
Recoletas Salud	95–98	79–80	97–79	100–102	89–102	110–105	94–81	99–91	107–96	96–88	86–93	78–94	—	94–99	96–88	88–110	97–90	74–79
Río Breogán	93–86	78–109	95–76	91–78	94–95	95–74	81–92	114–87	100–103	96–108	87–99	85–103	105–78	—	100–99	95–106	98–82	90–113
Surne Bilbao	80–76	66–71	86–80	80–84	106–75	88–83	79–72	93–75	69–76	95–78	81–71	88–82	95–85	100–90	—	96–82	90–74	72–116
UCAM Murcia	80–77	84–83	86–75	84–65	90–84	107–91	87–76	116–95	89–84	86–80	95–64	80–91	101–82	83–96	100–81	—	87–69	92–80
Unicaja	105–83	77–83	95–71	105–82	112–89	88–79	100–101	91–72	90–93	70–95	91–79	92–96	99–91	101–83	86–68	92–88	—	89–96
Valencia Basket	102–90	93–81	98–72	103–76	115–73	107–91	105–81	101–65	86–88	96–79	84–79	82–96	100–82	105–88	88–83	110–84	70–76	—

Source: ACB
Legend: Blue = home team win; Red = away team win.

== Playoffs ==
Quarterfinals
2	Valencia Basket	83	88	2
7	Surne Bilbao	80	71	0
3	Kosner Baskonia	85	63	88	1
6	Asisa Joventut	71	82	96	2
4	UCAM Murcia	68	90	76	1
5	Barça	91	87	100	2
1	Real Madrid	97	118	95	1
8	La Laguna Tenerife	98	83	107	2

Semifinals
2	Valencia Basket	118	90	87	3
6	Asisa Joventut	117	76	75	0
5	Barça	100	97	85	3
8	La Laguna Tenerife	67	89	76	0

Finals
2	Valencia Basket	112	102	88	108	3
5	Barça	113	75	80	84	1

== Final standings ==
Pos	Team	Pld	W	L	Qualification or relegation
1	Valencia Basket (C)	43	33	10	Already qualified to EuroLeague
2	Barça	44	30	14	Already qualified to EuroLeague
3	Asisa Joventut	40	24	16	Qualification to Champions League regular season
4	La Laguna Tenerife	40	20	20	Qualification to EuroCup
5	Real Madrid	37	27	10	Already qualified to EuroLeague
6	Kosner Baskonia	37	26	11	Already qualified to EuroLeague
7	UCAM Murcia	37	26	11	Qualification to Champions League regular season
8	Surne Bilbao	36	19	17	Qualification to Champions League regular season
9	Unicaja	34	17	17	Qualification to Champions League regular season
10	Baxi Manresa	34	16	18	Qualification to EuroCup
11	Río Breogán	34	15	19	Qualification to Champions League qualifying rounds
12	Bàsquet Girona	34	14	20	Qualification to FIBA Europe Cup regular season
13	Recoletas Salud San Pablo Burgos	34	12	22	Qualification to EuroCup
14	Hiopos Lleida	34	12	22	
15	Casademont Zaragoza	34	10	24	
16	MoraBanc Andorra	34	10	24	
17	Dreamland Gran Canaria (R)	34	10	24	Relegation to Primera FEB
18	Coviran Granada (R)	34	6	28	Relegation to Primera FEB

Source: ACB
(C) Champions; (R) Relegated

== Statistical leaders ==
=== Performance index rating ===
Pos	Player	Club	PIR
1	(Croatia) Luka Božić	Coviran Granada	24.3
2	(Croatia) Mario Hezonja	Real Madrid	19.1
3	(Dominican Republic) Jean Montero	Valencia Basket	18.7
4	(United States) Trent Forrest	Kosner Baskonia	18.4
5	(Georgia (country)) Giorgi Shermadini	La Laguna Tenerife	17.8

Source: ACB

=== Points ===
Pos	Player	Club	PPG
1	(France) Timothé Luwawu-Cabarrot	Kosner Baskonia	18.1
2	(Slovakia) David DeJulius	UCAM Murcia	17.7
3	(Croatia) Mario Hezonja	Real Madrid	17.5
4	(Croatia) Luka Božić	Coviran Granada	16.2
5	(Spain) Santi Yusta	Casademont Zaragoza	15.9

Source: ACB

=== Rebounds ===
Pos	Player	Club	RPG
1	(Iceland) Tryggvi Hlinason	Surne Bilbao	6.8
2	(Croatia) Luka Božić	Coviran Granada	6.6
3	(United States) Ethan Happ	Recoletas Salud San Pablo Burgos	6.5
4	(Montenegro) Bojan Dubljević	Casademont Zaragoza	6.3
5	(Lithuania) Martinas Geben	Bàsquet Girona	6.1

Source: ACB

=== Assists ===
Pos	Player	Club	APG
1	(Guinea) Shannon Evans	MoraBanc Andorra	5.5
2	(Brazil) Marcelinho Huertas	La Laguna Tenerife	5.5
3	(Croatia) Dominik Mavra	Río Breogán	5.3
4	(United States) DeWayne Russell	Río Breogán	5.2
5	(Spain) Ricky Rubio	Asisa Joventut	5.1

Source: ACB

== Attendances to arenas ==
=== Average attendances ===
Pos	Team	Total	High	Low	Average	Change
1	Valencia Basket	269,274	15,068	9,332	12,240	+85.5%
2	Unicaja	156,499	10,681	6,886	9,206	−7.4%
3	Recoletas Salud San Pablo Burgos	153,136	9,357	8,579	9,008	+2.1%^{1}
4	Kosner Baskonia	168,558	12,247	7,109	8,871	−7.1%
5	Surne Bilbao	151,678	9,734	7,302	8,427	+1.3%
6	Real Madrid	146,161	11,736	5,539	7,693	−9.7%
7	Asisa Joventut	134,325	12,179	4,006	7,070	+3.8%
8	Casademont Zaragoza	117,402	9,447	5,140	6,906	+4.4%
9	UCAM Murcia	130,061	7,500	5,824	6,845	+10.4%
10	Coviran Granada	113,767	7,836	5,343	6,692	−4.2%
11	Dreamland Gran Canaria	107,819	7,624	4,768	6,342	−4.0%
12	Hiopos Lleida	94,934	5,995	4,830	5,584	+5.0%
13	Barça	118,611	7,410	3,861	5,391	−3.1%
14	Río Breogán	89,479	5,310	5,045	5,263	+0.6%
15	Bàsquet Girona	83,855	5,532	4,237	4,933	−0.1%
16	La Laguna Tenerife	92,104	5,100	4,233	4,848	−2.7%
17	Baxi Manresa	81,350	5,000	4,110	4,785	−1.8%
18	MoraBanc Andorra	59,007	4,602	2,732	3,471	−2.0%
	League total	2,268,020	15,068	2,732	6,936	+4.6%

Source: ACB
Notes:
1: Team played previous season in Primera FEB.

== Awards ==
All official awards of the 2025–26 ACB season.

=== MVP ===
Pos.	Player	Team
PF	(Croatia) Mario Hezonja	Real Madrid

=== Finals MVP ===
Pos.	Player	Team
PG	(Dominican Republic) Jean Montero	Valencia Basket

=== All-ACB Teams ===
Pos.	First Team		Second Team	
Pos.	Player	Team	Player	Team
PG	(Dominican Republic) Jean Montero	Valencia Basket	(Brazil) Marcelinho Huertas	La Laguna Tenerife
SG	(Slovakia) David DeJulius	UCAM Murcia	(Spain) Ricky Rubio	Asisa Joventut
SF	(France) Timothé Luwawu-Cabarrot	Kosner Baskonia	(Argentina) Gonzalo Corbalán	Recoletas Salud San Pablo Burgos
PF	(Croatia) Mario Hezonja	Real Madrid	(Georgia (country)) Giorgi Shermadini	La Laguna Tenerife
C	(Croatia) Luka Božić	Coviran Granada	(Cape Verde) Edy Tavares	Real Madrid

=== Best Young Player ===
Pos.	Player	Team
PG	(Spain) Sergio de Larrea	Valencia Basket

=== Best All-Young Team ===
Pos.	Player	Team
PG	(Spain) Sergio de Larrea	Valencia Basket
PG	(Spain) Rafa Villar	Kosner Baskonia
PF	(Spain) Izan Almansa	Real Madrid
PF	(Croatia) Michael Ružić	Asisa Joventut
C	(Mali) Bassala Bagayoko	Surne Bilbao

=== Top Scorer Award ===
Pos.	Player	Team
SF	(France) Timothé Luwawu-Cabarrot	Kosner Baskonia

=== Best Defender ===
Pos.	Player	Team
C	(Cape Verde) Edy Tavares	Real Madrid

=== Player of the round ===
Round	Player	Team	PIR
1	(Georgia (country)) Giorgi Shermadini	La Laguna Tenerife	38
2	(United States) Trent Forrest	Kosner Baskonia	43
3	(Slovakia) David DeJulius	UCAM Murcia	27
4	(Cape Verde) Edy Tavares	Real Madrid	39
5	(Spain) Santi Yusta	Casademont Zaragoza	31
6	(Brazil) Marcelinho Huertas	La Laguna Tenerife	37
7	(Guinea) Shannon Evans	MoraBanc Andorra	31
8	(France) Théo Maledon	Real Madrid	26
9	(Spain) Joel Parra	Barça	34
10	(Georgia (country)) Giorgi Shermadini (2)	La Laguna Tenerife	34
11	(Dominican Republic) Chris Duarte	Unicaja	31
12	(United States) James Batemon	Hiopos Lleida	32
13	(Lithuania) Martinas Geben	Bàsquet Girona	37
14	(Croatia) Mario Hezonja	Real Madrid	30
15	(Croatia) Ante Tomić	Asisa Joventut	39
16	(Spain) Francis Alonso	Río Breogán	32
17	(United States) James Batemon (2)	Hiopos Lleida	33
18	(Montenegro) Kendrick Perry	Unicaja	28
19	(Jamaica) Devontae Cacok	UCAM Murcia	31
20	(Croatia) Mario Hezonja (2)	Real Madrid	35
20	(South Sudan) Kur Kuath	Dreamland Gran Canaria	35
21	(United States) Trent Forrest (2)	Kosner Baskonia	30
22	(Croatia) Luka Božić	Coviran Granada	33
22	(United States) Ethan Happ	Recoletas Salud San Pablo Burgos	33
23	(Slovakia) David DeJulius (2)	UCAM Murcia	35
24	(Croatia) Luka Božić (2)	Coviran Granada	35
25	(Canada) Melvin Ejim	Hiopos Lleida	39
26	(Slovakia) David DeJulius (3)	UCAM Murcia	38
27	(Spain) Oriol Paulí	Hiopos Lleida	35
28	(Argentina) Nicolás Brussino	Dreamland Gran Canaria	33
29	(Croatia) Mario Hezonja (3)	Real Madrid	53
30	(Ukraine) Artem Pustovyi	MoraBanc Andorra	37
31	(Croatia) Luka Božić (3)	Coviran Granada	35
32	(Croatia) Luka Božić (4)	Coviran Granada	37
33	(Croatia) Luka Božić (5)	Coviran Granada	35
34	(Iceland) Tryggvi Hlinason	Surne Bilbao	35

=== Player of the month ===
Month	Rounds	Player	Team	PIR	W–L
October	1–4	(Georgia (country)) Giorgi Shermadini	La Laguna Tenerife	27.0	4–0
November	5–8	(France) Théo Maledon	Real Madrid	18.8	4–0
December	9–13	(France) Timothé Luwawu-Cabarrot	Kosner Baskonia	24.0	3–1
January	14–17	(Croatia) Mario Hezonja	Real Madrid	23.8	3–1
February	18–20	(Jamaica) Devontae Cacok	UCAM Murcia	27.0	3–0
March	21–24	(Croatia) Luka Božić	Coviran Granada	26.8	2–2
April	25–28	(Croatia) Luka Božić (2)	Coviran Granada	30.3	2–2
May	29–34	(Spain) Ricky Rubio	Asisa Joventut	24.2	5–0
