= ACB Best Young Player =

Spanish basketball award

ACB Best Young Player, previously known as the ACB Rising Star award from 2005 to 2013, is an award for the top-tier professional basketball league in Spain, the Spanish ACB League. The award has been given since the 2004–05 ACB season.

Currently, to be eligible for the award, players must be 22 years old or younger, and must have played in at least half of the league's games during the season, with an average playing time per game of at least 10 minutes. An All-ACB Best Young Players Team is also chosen.

== Rising Star award winners (2004–13) ==
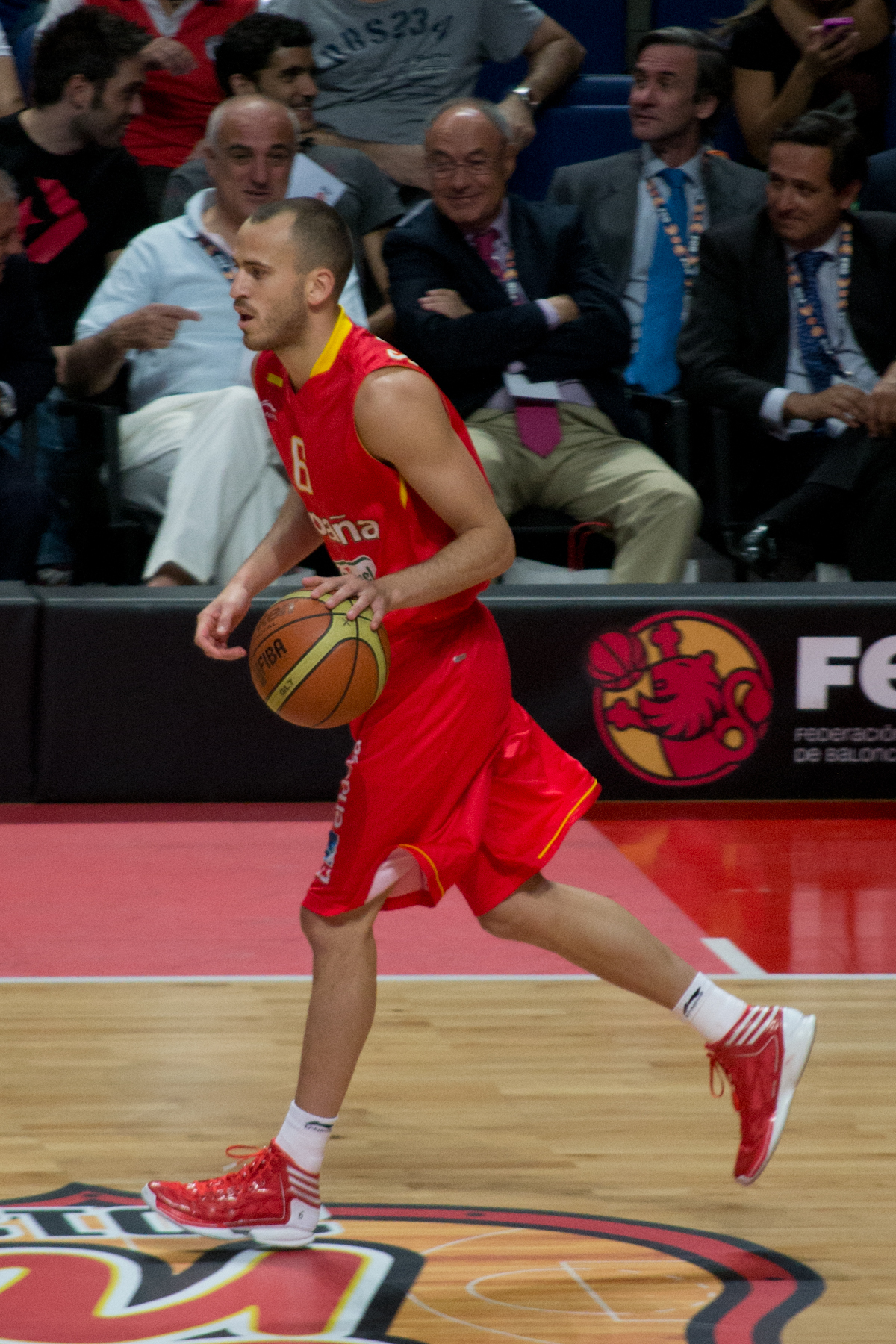
Sergio Rodríguez was the Liga ACB Rising Star in 2005.

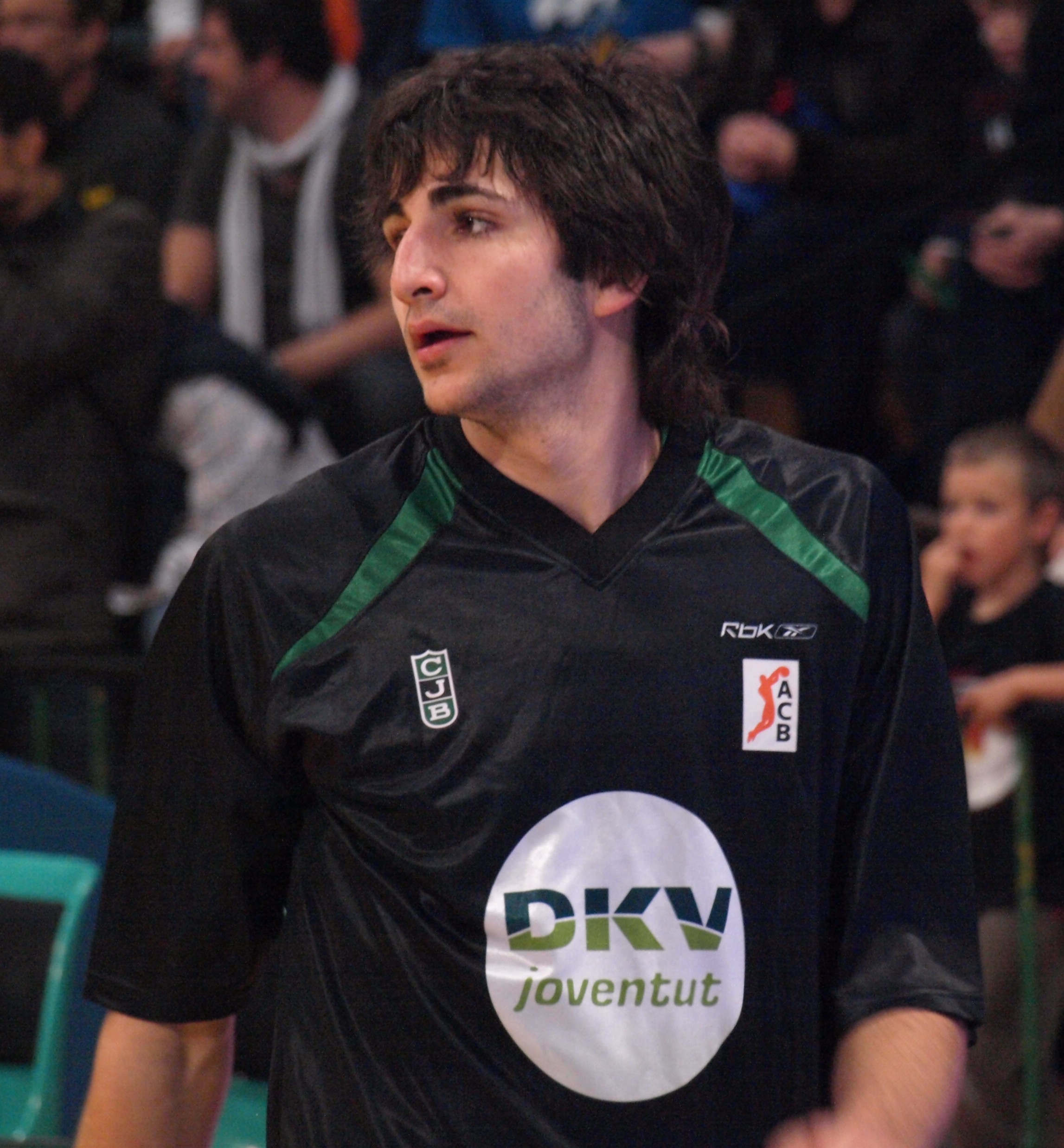
Ricky Rubio was the Liga ACB Rising Star in 2007.

The following is a list of the all-time ACB Rising Star award winners.

- Player nationalities by national team.

Season	Player	Team
2004–05	(Spain) Sergio Rodríguez	Adecco Estudiantes
2005–06	(Spain) Carlos Suárez	Adecco Estudiantes
2006–07	(Spain) Ricky Rubio	DKV Joventut
2007–08	(Bosnia and Herzegovina) Mirza Teletović	TAU Cerámica
2008–09	(Spain) Brad Oleson	Alta Gestión Fuenlabrada
2009–10	(North Macedonia) Richard Hendrix	CB Granada
2010–11	(Mexico) Gustavo Ayón	Baloncesto Fuenlabrada
2011–12	(United States) Micah Downs	Assignia Manresa
2012–13	(Tunisia) Salah Mejri	Blu:sens Monbús

== Best Young Player award winners (2013–present) ==
The following is a list of the all-time ACB Best Young Player award winners.

- Player nationalities by national team.

Season	Player	Team	Ref.
2013–14	(Spain) Guillem Vives	FIATC Joventut	
2014–15	(Spain) Dani Díez	Gipuzkoa Basket	
2015–16	(Spain) Juancho Hernangómez	Movistar Estudiantes	
2016–17	(Slovenia) Luka Dončić	Real Madrid	
2017–18	(Slovenia) Luka Dončić (2)	Real Madrid	
2018–19	(Spain) Carlos Alocén	Tecnyconta Zaragoza	
2019–20	(Spain) Carlos Alocén (2)	Casademont Zaragoza	
2020–21	(Spain) Usman Garuba	Real Madrid	
2021–22	(Spain) Joel Parra	Joventut Badalona	
2022–23	(Dominican Republic) Jean Montero	Real Betis	
2023–24	(Dominican Republic) Jean Montero (2)	MoraBanc Andorra	
2024–25	(Dominican Republic) Jean Montero (3)	Valencia Basket	
2025–26	(Spain) Sergio de Larrea	Valencia Basket	

== All-ACB Best Young Players Team ==
- Player nationalities by national team.

Season	Players	Teams
2013–14	(Spain) Guillem Vives	FIATC Joventut
2013–14	(Spain) Álex Abrines	FC Barcelona
2013–14	(Sweden) Markus Eriksson	La Bruixa d'Or
2013–14	(Latvia) Kristaps Porziņģis	Cajasol
2013–14	(Cape Verde) Walter Tavares	Herbalife Gran Canaria
2014–15	(Spain) Guillem Vives (2)	Valencia Basket
2014–15	(Spain) Álex Abrines (2)	FC Barcelona
2014–15	(Spain) Dani Díez	Gipuzkoa Basket
2014–15	(Latvia) Kristaps Porziņģis (2)	Baloncesto Sevilla
2014–15	(Spain) Willy Hernangómez	Baloncesto Sevilla
2015–16	(Sweden) Ludde Håkanson	Baloncesto Sevilla
2015–16	(Slovenia) Luka Dončić	Real Madrid
2015–16	(Spain) Santiago Yusta	Rio Natura Monbus Obradoiro
2015–16	(Spain) Juancho Hernangómez	Movistar Estudiantes
2015–16	(Spain) Willy Hernangómez (2)	Real Madrid
2016–17	(Slovenia) Luka Dončić (2)	Real Madrid
2016–17	(Spain) Alberto Abalde	Divina Seguros Joventut
2016–17	(Latvia) Rolands Šmits	Montakit Fuenlabrada
2016–17	(Bulgaria) Sasha Vezenkov	FC Barcelona Lassa
2016–17	(Latvia) Anžejs Pasečņiks	Herbalife Gran Canaria
2017–18	(Spain) Sergi García	Valencia Basket
2017–18	(Slovenia) Luka Dončić (3)	Real Madrid
2017–18	(Spain) Xabier López-Arostegui	Divina Seguros Joventut
2017–18	(Spain) Jonathan Barreiro	Tecnyconta Zaragoza
2017–18	(Sweden) Simon Birgander	Divina Seguros Joventut
2018–19	(Spain) Carlos Alocén	Tecnyconta Zaragoza
2018–19	(Spain) Santiago Yusta (2)	Real Madrid
2018–19	(Spain) Xabier López-Arostegui (2)	Divina Seguros Joventut
2018–19	(Slovenia) Vlatko Čančar	San Pablo Burgos
2018–19	(Democratic Republic of the Congo) Jordan Sakho	Baxi Manresa
2019–20	(Spain) Carlos Alocén (2)	Casademont Zaragoza
2019–20	(North Macedonia) Nenad Dimitrijević	Club Joventut Badalona
2019–20	(Czech Republic) Vít Krejčí	Casademont Zaragoza
2019–20	(Lithuania) Arnoldas Kulboka	RETAbet Bilbao Basket
2019–20	(Spain) Usman Garuba	Real Madrid
2020–21	(Spain) Carlos Alocén (3)	Real Madrid
2020–21	(Argentina) Leandro Bolmaro	FC Barcelona Lassa
2020–21	(Montenegro) Dino Radončić	Acunsa GBC
2020–21	(Democratic Republic of the Congo) Yannick Nzosa	Unicaja
2020–21	(Spain) Usman Garuba (2)	Real Madrid
2021–22	(Lithuania) Rokas Jokubaitis	FC Barcelona
2021–22	(Slovenia) Žiga Samar	Urbas Fuenlabrada
2021–22	(Spain) Jaime Pradilla	Valencia Basket
2021–22	(Spain) Joel Parra	Joventut Badalona
2021–22	(Senegal) Khalifa Diop	Herbalife Gran Canaria
2022–23	(Germany) Justus Hollatz	Río Breogán
2022–23	(Dominican Republic) Jean Montero	Real Betis
2022–23	(Spain) Michael Caicedo	Covirán Granada
2022–23	(Senegal) Khalifa Diop (2)	Gran Canaria
2022–23	(Spain) Aday Mara	Casademont Zaragoza
2023–24	(Dominican Republic) Jean Montero (2)	MoraBanc Andorra
2023–24	(Spain) Lucas Langarita	Casademont Zaragoza
2023–24	(Netherlands) Yannick Kraag	Joventut Badalona
2023–24	(The Gambia) Musa Sagnia	Baxi Manresa
2023–24	(Argentina) Juan Fernández	Río Breogán
2024–25	(Dominican Republic) Jean Montero (3)	Valencia Basket
2024–25	(Spain) Mario Saint-Supery	Baxi Manresa
2024–25	(Spain) Sergio de Larrea	Valencia Basket
2024–25	(Spain) Hugo González	Real Madrid
2024–25	(Belgium) Thijs de Ridder	Surne Bilbao Basket
2025–26	(Spain) Sergio de Larrea (2)	Valencia Basket
2025–26	(Spain) Rafa Villar	Kosner Baskonia
2025–26	(Mali) Bassala Bagayoko	Surne Bilbao Basket
2025–26	(Croatia) Michael Ružić	Joventut Badalona
2025–26	(Spain) Izan Almansa	Real Madrid

== See also ==
- ACB Most Valuable Player Award
- ACB Finals Most Valuable Player Award
- All-ACB Team
- ACB Defensive Player of the Year
