= Jaime Fernández (basketball) =

Spanish basketball player

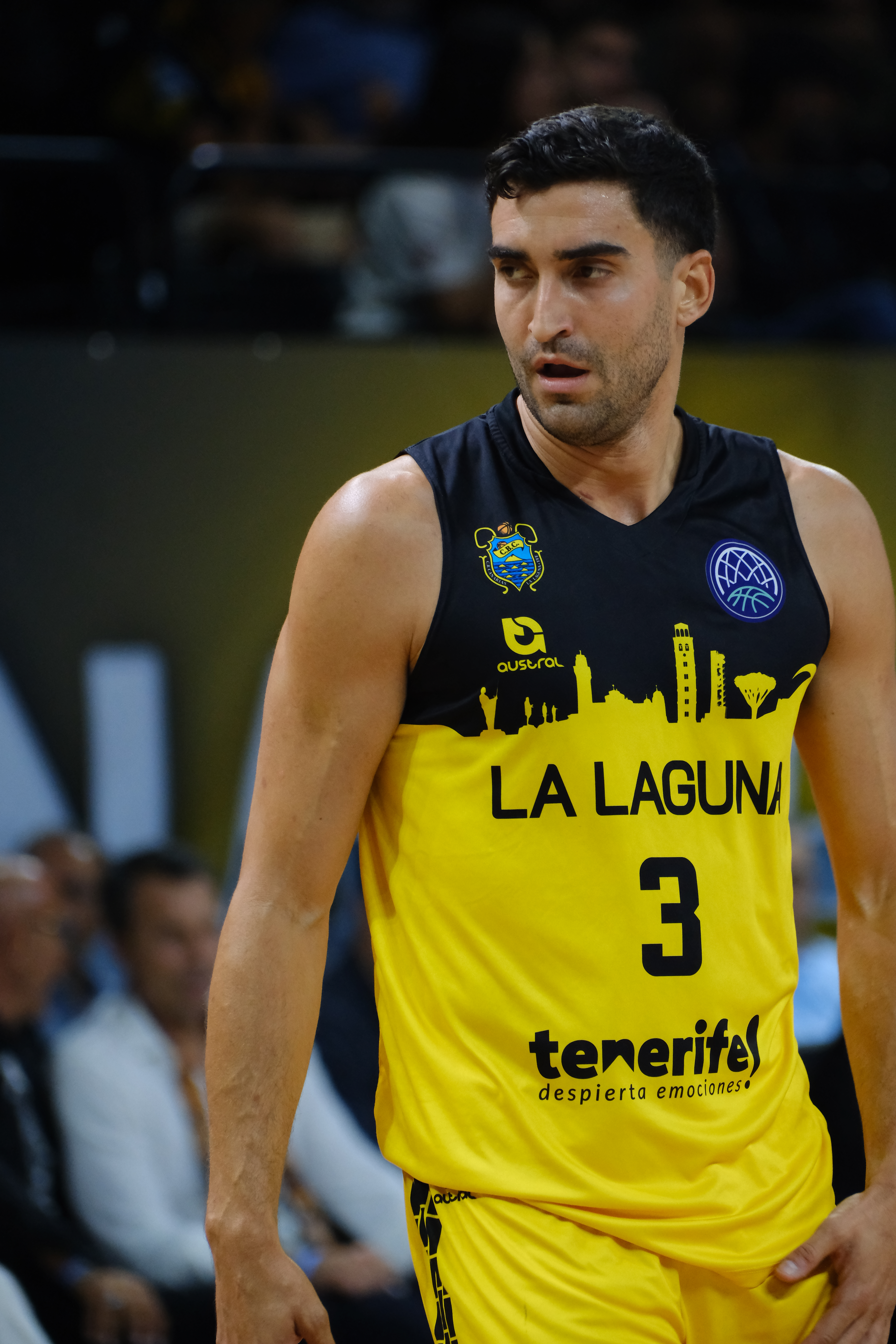
- Fernández with La Laguna Tenerife in 2025

No. 3 – La Laguna Tenerife
- Position: Point guard / Shooting guard
- League: Liga ACB

Personal information
- Born: 4 June 1993 (age 33) Madrid, Spain
- Listed height: 1.86 m (6 ft 1 in)
- Listed weight: 79 kg (174 lb)

Career information
- NBA draft: 2015: undrafted
- Playing career: 2010–present

Career history
- 2010–2017: Estudiantes
- 2017–2018: Andorra
- 2018–2022: Unicaja
- 2022–present: Tenerife

Career highlights
- FIBA Intercontinental Cup champion (2023)
Medals
Men's basketball
Representing Spain
EuroBasket
Gold medal – first place	EuroBasket 2022
U20 European Championship
Bronze medal – third place	2013 Estonia	U20 Team
Bronze medal – third place	2012 Slovenia	U20 Team
U18 European Championship
Gold medal – first place	2011 Poland	U18 Team
U16 European Championship
Gold medal – first place	2009 Lithuania	U16 Team

Jaime Fernández Bernabé (born 4 June 1993) is a Spanish professional basketball player for La Laguna Tenerife of the Spanish Liga ACB. He has also represented the Spain national team.

Standing at 6 ft 1 in (1.86 m), Fernández can play both as a point guard and a shooting guard.

== Early life and youth career ==
Born in Madrid, Fernández started playing basketball at 8 years old, playing for CD Montserrat and Real Canoe. He joined the youth ranks of CB Estudiantes in 2008.

He was on the Spain men's national basketball team that won the 2009 U-16 and 2011 U-18 tournaments.

== Professional career ==
After climbing through the ranks of Estudiantes since 2008, Fernández made his professional debut with the team in Liga ACB in 2010. Signing a contract extension for two more seasons in July 2013, Fernández's role grew into that of a key player for the team, eventually becoming one of Estudiantes' team captains.

In August 2017, Fernández signed with Andorra after the club reached an agreement with Estudiantes for the player's rights.

In July 2018, Fernández signed with Unicaja Málaga, signing a three-year deal. He signed a contract extension for a further season in June 2019, linking him to Unicaja until 2022.

On July 8, 2022 Fernández signed with Tenerife of the Spanish Liga ACB. In March 2024, he suffered a major injury to his right knee that would sideline him until January 2025. On July 7, 2025, he signed a contract extension with Tenerife for two more seasons. On June 2, 2026, Fernández recorded one of his best performances for the Canarians during an away game against Real Madrid in the first round of the 2026 ACB Playoffs. He scored 17 points in the last quarter, including the winning three-pointer four seconds before expiration.

== National team career ==
Fernández has represented the Spanish national team internationally. He was part of the Spanish team that won the 2022 EuroBasket, being a starter in the final and scoring 13 points.
