= Jean Montero =

Dominican basketball player (born 2003)

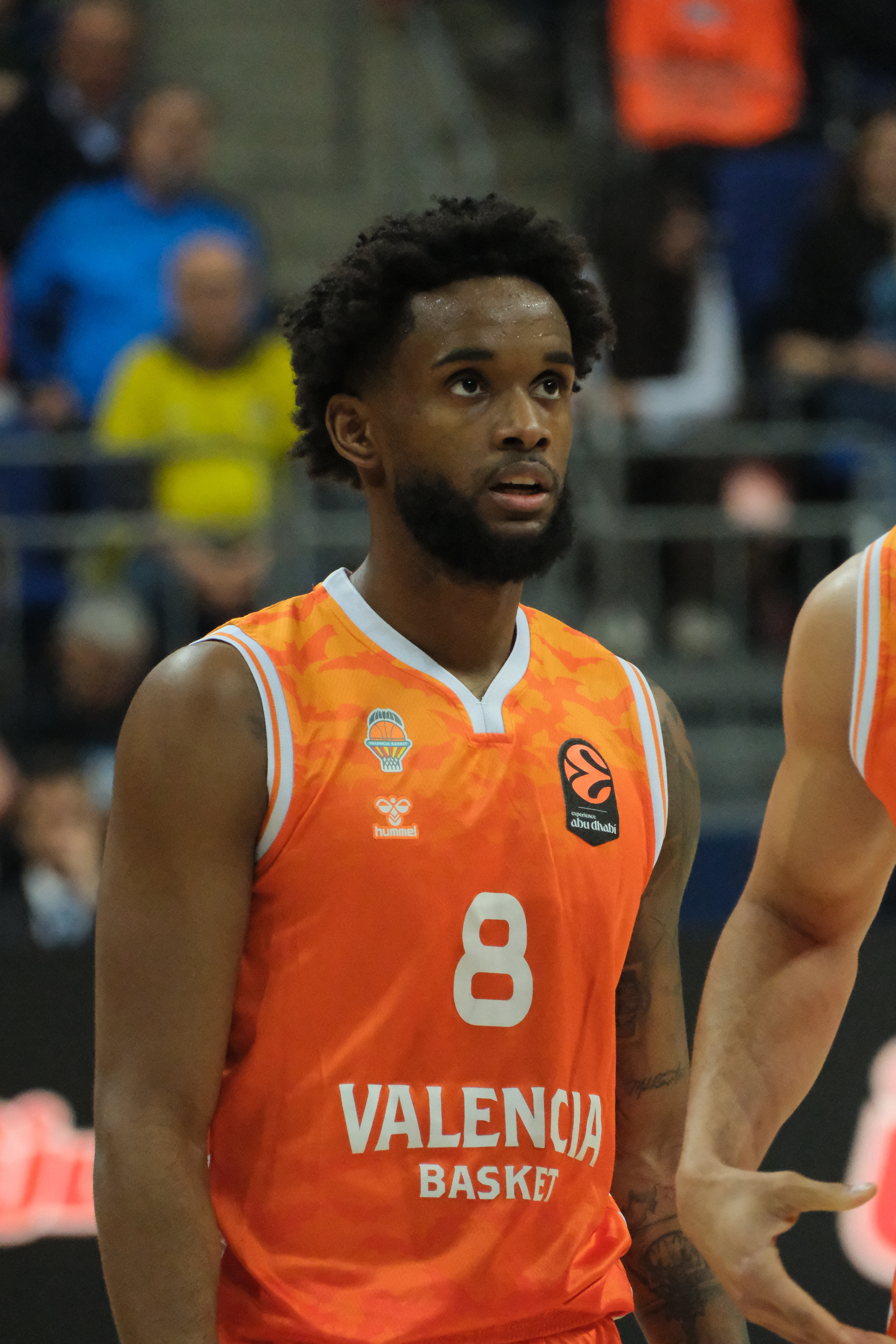
- Montero with Valencia Basket in 2026

No. 8 – Olympiacos
- Position: Point guard
- League: GBL; EuroLeague

Personal information
- Born: 3 July 2003 (age 23) Santo Domingo, Dominican Republic
- Listed height: 1.89 m (6 ft 2 in)
- Listed weight: 79.5 kg (175 lb)

Career information
- High school: DME Academy (Daytona Beach, Florida)
- NBA draft: 2022: undrafted
- Playing career: 2019–present

Career history
- 2019–2024: Gran Canaria
- 2019–2021: →Gran Canaria B
- 2021–2022: →Team Elite
- 2023: →Real Betis
- 2023–2024: →Andorra
- 2024–2026: Valencia
- 2026–present: Olympiacos

Career highlights
- All-EuroLeague First Team (2026); EuroLeague Playoffs MVP (2026); EuroLeague Rising Star (2026); All-EuroCup First Team (2025); EuroCup Rising Star (2025); Liga ACB champion (2026); Spanish Supercup winner (2025); Liga ACB Finals MVP (2026); 2x All-Liga ACB First Team (2025, 2026); All-Liga ACB Second Team (2024); 3× Liga ACB Best Young Player (2023–2025); 3× All-Liga ACB Young Team (2023–2025); Greek Super Cup winner (2026); All-OTE First Team (2022); OTE Top Scorer (2022)
Medals
Men's basketball
Representing the Dominican Republic
FIBA U16 AmeriCup
Bronze medal – third place	2019 Brazil	Team

Jean Claudio Montero Berroa (born 3 July 2003) is a Dominican professional basketball player for Olympiacos of the Greek Basketball League (GBL) and the EuroLeague.

== Early life and youth career ==
Born in Santo Domingo, Montero grew up playing basketball and baseball and was introduced to basketball when he visited a court to entertain himself. He first played basketball with his cousin near his home, using the wheels of an old bicycle to make a rim. He started playing the sport seriously at the age of 10 or 11 through Club DOSA in the Villa Juana sector. Montero subsequently moved to Club Mauricio Báez, also based in Villa Juana. In 2018, Montero began attending DME Academy in Daytona Beach, Florida, where he averaged 20 points and eight rebounds per game. At the time, he also competed for NightRydas Elite at the Nike Elite Youth Basketball League under-15 division.

After having success at the 2019 FIBA Under-16 Americas Championship in June 2019, Montero received offers from clubs in Spain and high schools in the United States. He continued his career with the Spanish club Gran Canaria. Later that month, Montero was named MVP of the Basketball Without Borders Americas camp in Medellín, despite being a year younger than the other participants. In late December 2019, he averaged 21.3 points, 4.8 rebounds, four assists, and 1.8 steals for Gran Canaria's under-18 team at the Valencia Tournament, a qualifier for the Adidas Next Generation Tournament (ANGT). He earned MVP honors of the competition after posting 30 points, six rebounds and seven assists in an 88–72 win over Unicaja's under-18 team in the title game.

== Professional career ==
=== Gran Canaria (2019–2024) ===
In the 2019–20 season, Montero began playing for Gran Canaria B, the reserve team of Liga ACB club Gran Canaria, in the third-tier LEB Plata. He immediately became a key player for his team. In his debut on 15 December 2019, Montero recorded 12 points, four assists, and six steals in an 84–65 win over Menorca. One week later, he scored a season-high 28 points in a 97–89 victory over Benicarló. On 18 January 2020, Montero collected 27 points with six three-pointers and six rebounds in a 98–82 win over Pardinyes. He finished the season averaging 15.3 points, 3.4 rebounds, and three assists per game, shooting 43.5 percent from three-point range.

On 27 September 2020, Montero made his debut for Gran Canaria's senior team in the ACB, recording five points and three rebounds in 10 minutes in an 88–71 loss to Zaragoza. On 5 December, he scored 33 points, a career-high in the LEB Plata, and six rebounds in a 95–86 loss to Navarra. On 17 March 2021, Montero posted 27 points, six rebounds, and six assists in an 82–54 win against Navarra, and was named MVP of Round 21 in the LEB Plata. In the 2020–21 LEB Plata season, he averaged 18 points, 5.7 rebounds, 4.4 assists, and 2.5 steals per game. After his time with Overtime Elite concluded, Montero would return with the Gran Canaria properly.

=== Overtime Elite (2021–2022) ===
On 4 June 2021, Montero was loaned to Team Overtime of Overtime Elite (OTE) for the league's inaugural season. Montero was projected as a potential lottery pick for the 2022 NBA draft.

In 24 games, he averaged 16.9 points, 6.1 rebounds, 4.7 assists, and 3.4 steals per game, leading OTE in scoring.

Montero went undrafted in the 2022 NBA draft. He joined the New York Knicks for the 2022 NBA Summer League.

=== Real Betis (2023) ===
In 2023, Montero would sign with Real Betis Baloncesto in the Spanish Liga ACB.

=== Andorra (2023–2024) ===
Following his brief time spent with Real Betis, Montero would sign with BC Andorra in the Spanish Liga ACB.

=== Valencia (2024–2026) ===
On July 9, 2024, he signed with Valencia of the Spanish Liga ACB. In the 2024–25 EuroCup Basketball season he led Valencia in points (13.2) and assists (5.3) per game, and had a team-best PIR of 15.9, as the Taronja made it to the semifinals of the competition.

On July 5, 2026, Montero parted ways with the team after the full amount of the buyout clause in his contract was paid.

=== Olympiacos (2026–present) ===
On July 8, 2026, Montero signed with Olympiacos of the Greek Basketball League (GBL). On October 15, 2026, Montero was named EuroLeague MVP for Round 5. He scored 26 points, 5 rebounds, and 2 assists.

In October 2026, after suffering an injury in Round 6 of the EuroLeague, he underwent surgery on his left knee to repair his lateral meniscus, facing an expected six-month spell on the sidelines.

== National team career ==
=== Junior national team ===
Shortly before turning 14 years old, Montero made his national team debut for the Dominican Republic at the 2017 FIBA Under-16 Americas Championship in Formosa, Argentina. In five games, he averaged 9.2 points, 3.6 rebounds and 1.8 assists per game, leading his team to fifth place and a spot in the 2018 FIBA Under-17 World Cup in Argentina. At the Under-17 World Cup, Montero was two years younger than most of his opponents but played well against the competition. In seven games, he averaged 15.4 points, 4.9 rebounds and 2.9 assists, while leading the tournament in steals (4.1 per game). He helped the Dominican Republic to ninth place, one of its best finishes in a global tournament.

In December 2018, at the Centrobasket Under-15 Championship in Hermosillo, Montero was named tournament MVP after averaging 25.8 points, eight rebounds and five assists and winning a gold medal. He helped his team win the bronze medal at the 2019 FIBA Under-16 Americas Championship in Belém. Montero led the tournament in points (30.3) and steals (3.3) per game while also averaging 9.5 rebounds and 3.2 assists. In the bronze medal game against Argentina, he recorded 49 points, 12 rebounds and six steals. He was named to the all-tournament team. In July 2018, Montero led the Dominican Republic to fourth place at the Centrobasket Under-17 Championship in San Juan, Puerto Rico. He was the tournament's leading scorer (28.2 points per game) and averaged six rebounds, 4.4 assists, and 4.2 steals.

=== Senior national team ===
In August 2019, at age 16, Montero was one of 17 players to join the Dominican Republic senior national team for training camp in preparation for the 2019 FIBA Basketball World Cup in China. He played three exhibition games for the team but did not compete in the World Cup. Montero played for the Dominican Republic during 2022 FIBA AmeriCup qualification.

== Career statistics ==
Legend
GP	Games played	GS	Games started	MPG	Minutes per game
FG%	Field-goal percentage	3P%	3-point field-goal percentage	FT%	Free-throw percentage
RPG	Rebounds per game	APG	Assists per game	SPG	Steals per game
BPG	Blocks per game	PPG	Points per game	PIR	Performance index rating
**Bold**	Career high

=== EuroLeague ===
Year	Team	GP	GS	MPG	FG%	3P%	FT%	RPG	APG	SPG	BPG	PPG	PIR
2025–26	Valencia	38	20	22.5	.418	.324	.882	3.0	4.8	1.1	.3	14.4	17.9
Career		38	20	22.5	.418	.324	.882	3.0	4.8	1.1	.3	14.4	17.9

=== EuroCup ===
Year	Team	GP	GS	MPG	FG%	3P%	FT%	RPG	APG	SPG	BPG	PPG	PIR
2020–21	Gran Canaria	4	0	4.1	.200	.000	.857	.2	.5	.0	.0	2.0	.5
2024–25	Valencia	**17**	**10**	**22.2**	**.500**	**.308**	**.822**	**2.9**	**5.3**	**1.7**	**.4**	**13.2**	**15.9**
Career		21	10	19.6	.388	.298	.825	2.4	4.4	1.4	.3	11.0	13.0

=== Domestic leagues ===
Year	Team	League	GP	MPG	FG%	3P%	FT%	RPG	APG	SPG	BPG	PPG
2019–20	(Spain) Gran CanariaB	LEB Oro	11	23.1	.435	.339	.769	3.4	3.0	1.8	.2	15.3
2020–21	(Spain) Gran CanariaB	LEB Oro	24	29.5	.425	.301	.838	5.7	4.4	2.5	.1	18.0
2021–22	(United States) Elite	OTE	24	27.1	.432	.277	.752	6.1	4.7	3.4	.0	16.9
2022–23	(Spain) Real Betis	ACB	16	26.6	.435	.351	.813	3.2	4.3	1.6	.1	17.6
2023–24	(Spain) Andorra	ACB	28	25.8	.441	.325	.892	3.6	5.1	2.0	.1	15.7
2024–25	(Spain) Valencia	ACB	38	24.1	.451	.361	.872	3.7	4.4	1.1	.2	15.9
2025–26	(Spain) Valencia	ACB	35	22.0	.472	.400	.899	2.9	4.3	1.2	.2	15.7

== Awards and accomplishments ==
=== Titles won ===
- Liga ACB Champion: 2026 (with Valencia Basket)
- Spanish Supercup Winner: 2025 (with Valencia Basket)
- Greek Super Cup Winner: 2026 (with Olympiacos Piraeus)

=== Dominican Republic youth national team ===
- FIBA U16 AmeriCup: Bronze

=== Other honors ===
- EuroLeague Final Four Participation: 2026 (with Valencia Basket)
- EuroLeague SuperCup Finalist: 2026 (with Olympiacos Piraeus)
- EuroCup Semifinalist: 2025 (with Valencia Basket)
- Liga ACB Runner-up: 2025 (with Valencia Basket)

=== Individual awards and accomplishments ===
==== European awards ====
- All-EuroLeague First Team: 2026
- EuroLeague Playoffs MVP: 2026
- EuroLeague Rising Star 2026
- All-EuroCup First Team: 2025
- EuroCup Rising Star: 2025

==== Domestic awards ====
- Liga ACB Finals MVP: 2026
- 2x All-Liga ACB First Team: 2025, 2026
- All-Liga ACB Second Team: 2024
- 3× Liga ACB Best Young Player: 2023–2025
- 3× All-Liga ACB Young Team: 2023–2025
- All-OTE First Team: 2022
- OTE Top Scorer: 2022

==== Dominican Republic youth national team tournaments awards ====
- All-FIBA U16 AmeriCup Team: 2019
- FIBA U16 AmeriCup Top Scorer: 2019
