= Timothé Luwawu-Cabarrot =

French basketball player (born 1995)

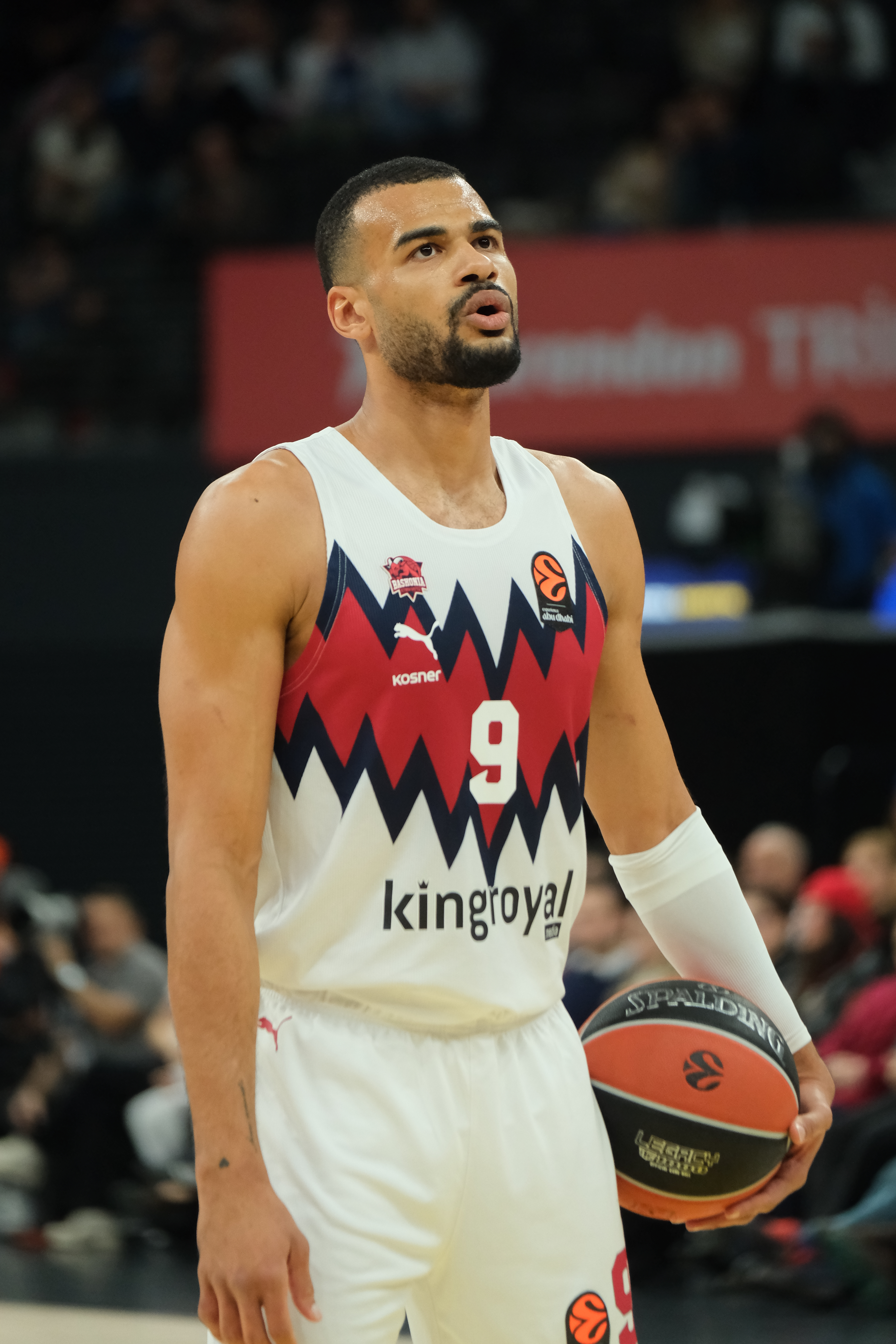
- Luwawu-Cabarrot with Baskonia in 2026

No. 3 – Real Madrid
- Position: Small forward / Shooting guard
- League: Liga ACB; EuroLeague

Personal information
- Born: 9 May 1995 (age 31) Cannes, France
- Listed height: 1.98 m (6 ft 6 in)
- Listed weight: 215 lb (98 kg)

Career information
- NBA draft: 2016: 1st round, 24th overall pick
- Drafted by: Philadelphia 76ers
- Playing career: 2012–present

Career history
- 2012–2015: Antibes Sharks
- 2015–2016: Mega Leks
- 2016–2018: Philadelphia 76ers
- 2016: →Delaware 87ers
- 2018–2019: Oklahoma City Thunder
- 2019: Chicago Bulls
- 2019–2021: Brooklyn Nets
- 2019–2020: →Long Island Nets
- 2021–2022: Atlanta Hawks
- 2022–2023: Olimpia Milano
- 2023–2024: ASVEL
- 2024–2026: Baskonia
- 2026–present: Real Madrid

Career highlights
- EuroLeague SuperCup champion (2026); Lega Serie A champion (2023); Spanish Cup winner (2026); All-Liga ACB First Team (2026); Liga ACB Top Scorer (2026); Serbian Cup winner (2016); All-ABA League Team (2016); LNB Pro B champion (2013); LNB Pro B Leaders Cup winner (2015)
- Stats at NBA.com
- Stats at Basketball Reference
Medals
Men's basketball
Representing France
Summer Olympics
Silver medal – second place	2020 Tokyo	Team
EuroBasket
Silver medal – second place	2022 Czech Republic–Georgia–Italy–Germany

Timothé Luwawu-Cabarrot (French pronunciation: [timɔte luwawu kabaʁo]; born 9 May 1995) is a French professional basketball player for Real Madrid of the Liga ACB and the EuroLeague. He was selected 24th overall pick by the Philadelphia 76ers in the 2016 NBA draft.

== Professional career ==
=== Olympique Antibes (2012–2015) ===
Between 2012 and 2014, Luwawu-Cabarrot played a total of five games for the Antibes Sharks. In January 2014 he signed his first pro deal with Antibes, and in 2014–15, he became a full squad member for the first time. In 42 games for Antibes in 2014–15, he averaged 7.1 points, 2.5 rebounds, 1.6 assists, and 1.1 steals per game. He also helped the team win the LNB Pro B Leaders Cup. He originally planned to enter the 2015 NBA draft, but ultimately did not.

=== Mega Leks (2015–2016) ===
On 5 July 2015, Luwawu-Cabarrot signed with Mega Leks of Serbia for the 2015–16 season. He helped the club win the Serbian Cup, and at the season's end, he earned All-ABA League Team honours. In 28 ABA League games for Mega Leks, he averaged 14.6 points, 4.8 rebounds, 2.8 assists and 1.7 steals per game.

=== Philadelphia 76ers (2016–2018) ===
In April 2016, Luwawu-Cabarrot declared for the 2016 NBA draft. He was subsequently selected with the 24th overall pick in the draft by the Philadelphia 76ers. On 3 July 2016, he signed his rookie scale contract with the 76ers and joined the team for the 2016 NBA Summer League. On 29 October 2016, he made his NBA debut in a 104–72 loss to the Atlanta Hawks, recording one rebound, one assist and one steal in six minutes off the bench. On 1 February 2017, he made the first start of his career in place of the injured Robert Covington and scored seven points in a 113–95 loss to the Dallas Mavericks. On 12 March 2017, he scored a season-high 18 points in a 118–116 win over the Los Angeles Lakers. On 31 March 2017, he set a new season high with 19 points in a 122–105 loss to the Cleveland Cavaliers. Two days later, he had a 23-point effort in a 113–105 loss to the Toronto Raptors. On 10 April 2017, he scored a season-best 24 points in a 120–111 loss to the Indiana Pacers. During his rookie season, he had multiple assignments to the Delaware 87ers of the NBA Development League.

=== Oklahoma City Thunder (2018–2019) ===
On 25 July 2018, Luwawu-Cabarrot was traded to the Oklahoma City Thunder in a three-team deal involving the 76ers and the Atlanta Hawks.

=== Chicago Bulls (2019) ===
On 1 February 2019, Luwawu-Cabarrot was traded with cash considerations to the Chicago Bulls in exchange for a protected 2020 second-round draft pick.

=== Brooklyn Nets (2019–2021) ===
On 30 September 2019, Luwawu-Cabarrot joined the Cleveland Cavaliers for training camp and played two preseason games before being waived.

On 23 October 2019, Luwawu-Cabarrot signed a two-way contract with the Brooklyn Nets. On 15 January 2020, the Nets announced that they had signed Luwawu-Cabarrot to a 10-day contract. On 25 January, he was signed to a second 10-day contract. On 7 February, Luwawu-Cabarrot signed a multi-year contract with the Nets.

=== Atlanta Hawks (2021–2022) ===
On 22 September 2021, Luwawu-Cabarrot signed with the Atlanta Hawks.

On 24 September 2022, Luwawu-Cabarrot signed with the Phoenix Suns. After appearing in three preseason games, Luwawu-Cabarrot was waived on 15 October.

=== Olimpia Milano (2022–2023) ===
On 19 November 2022, Luwawu-Cabarrot made his return to Europe, signing with Italian and EuroLeague powerhouse Olimpia Milano in order to replace the injured Shavon Shields. On 14 April 2023, he parted ways with the Italian club after the EuroLeague regular season had concluded. Luwawu-Cabarrot averaged 9.4 points, 2.6 rebounds and 1.1 assists per contest in the EuroLeague, as well as 11.9 points, 4.1 rebounds and 1.6 assists in domestic league competition.

=== ASVEL (2023–2024) ===
On 3 August 2023, Luwawu-Cabarrot returned to his native France, signing a one-year deal with ASVEL of the LNB Élite and the EuroLeague.

=== Baskonia (2024–2026) ===
On 12 June 2024, Luwawu-Cabarrot signed a two-season contract with Baskonia of the Liga ACB and the EuroLeague. In his second season with Baskonia, Luwawu-Cabarrot led the 2025–26 ACB in points with 18.1 points per game and made the All-Liga ACB First Team. He also helped the Basques win the 2026 Copa del Rey.

=== Real Madrid (2026–present) ===
On 17 July 2026, Luwawu-Cabarrot signed a two-year contract with Real Madrid of the Liga ACB and the EuroLeague.

== National team career ==
Luwawu-Cabarrot played for the junior French national basketball teams in both the 2014 FIBA Europe Under-20 Championship, and the 2015 FIBA Europe Under-20 Championship. In 2015, he helped France to a semifinals appearance, while averaging 11.6 points and 4.9 rebounds per game. Luwawu-Cabarrot was a member of the French national basketball team that finished second in the 2020 Tokyo Olympics. In the gold medal match versus the United States men's basketball team, Luwawu-Cabarrot scored 11 points in the losing effort, earning a silver medal. .

== Personal life ==
Luwawu-Cabarrot was born in France, and is of Congolese descent through his father.

== Career statistics ==
Legend
GP	Games played	GS	Games started	MPG	Minutes per game
FG%	Field-goal percentage	3P%	3-point field-goal percentage	FT%	Free-throw percentage
RPG	Rebounds per game	APG	Assists per game	SPG	Steals per game
BPG	Blocks per game	PPG	Points per game	PIR	Performance index rating
**Bold**	Career high

=== NBA ===
==== Regular season ====
Year	Team	GP	GS	MPG	FG%	3P%	FT%	RPG	APG	SPG	BPG	PPG
2016–17	Philadelphia	**68**	**19**	17.2	.402	.311	**.854**	2.2	1.1	.5	.1	6.4
2017–18	Philadelphia	52	7	15.5	.375	.335	.793	1.4	1.0	.2	.1	5.8
2018–19	Oklahoma City	21	1	5.9	.302	.227	.667	.9	.2	.2	.0	1.7
2018–19	Chicago	29	6	**18.8**	.394	.330	.771	**2.7**	.8	.5	**.2**	6.8
2019–20	Brooklyn	47	2	18.1	**.435**	**.388**	.852	**2.7**	.6	.4	.1	**7.8**
2020–21	Brooklyn	58	7	18.1	.365	.314	.814	2.2	**1.2**	**.6**	.1	6.4
2021–22	Atlanta	52	18	13.2	.398	.361	**.854**	1.6	.8	.3	.1	4.4
Career		328	60	16.0	.391	.335	.829	2.0	.9	.4	.1	5.9

==== Playoffs ====
Year	Team	GP	GS	MPG	FG%	3P%	FT%	RPG	APG	SPG	BPG	PPG
2020	Brooklyn	4	**3**	**32.8**	.339	**.333**	**.917**	**3.8**	**1.5**	**.8**	—	**16.0**
2021	Brooklyn	**7**	0	3.6	.300	**.333**	—	.4	.3	—	—	1.1
2022	Atlanta	4	0	5.5	**.500**	**.333**	—	.8	.5	—	—	1.3
Career		15	3	11.9	.342	.333	.917	1.4	.7	.2	—	5.1

=== EuroLeague ===
Year	Team	GP	GS	MPG	FG%	3P%	FT%	RPG	APG	SPG	BPG	PPG	PIR
2022–23	Milano	24	17	21.5	.446	.333	.824	2.6	1.1	.6	.1	9.4	6.0
2023–24	ASVEL	**28**	**20**	**28.1**	**.467**	**.376**	.830	**3.4**	**2.3**	**1.1**	.1	**13.0**	**11.1**
2024–25	Baskonia	26	19	24.5	.392	.337	**.848**	3.2	2.0	.8	**.2**	10.0	7.3
Career		78	56	25.0	.452	.380	.846	3.1	1.8	.9	.1	12.0	9.5

=== Domestic leagues ===
Year	Team	League	GP	MPG	FG%	3P%	FT%	RPG	APG	SPG	BPG	PPG
2012–13	(France) Antibes Sharks	Pro B	2	3.0	1.000	—	1.000	1.5	—	—	—	2.0
2013–14	(France) Antibes Sharks	Pro A	4	5.8	.250	.000	1.000	.7	.7	.2	—	1.5
2014–15	(France) Antibes Sharks	Pro B	42	19.9	.399	.287	.763	2.5	1.6	1.1	.1	7.1
2015–16	(Serbia) Mega	KLS	5	24.8	.431	.250	.731	3.6	2.8	1.6	—	13.6
2015–16	(Serbia) Mega	ABA	28	31.1	.398	.372	.690	4.8	2.7	1.7	.4	14.6
2016–17	(United States) Delaware 87ers	D-League	3	27.1	.417	.500	.889	4.0	2.7	1.7	.3	10.3
2019–20	(United States) Long Island Nets	G League	10	33.2	.446	.286	.696	6.1	3.0	1.1	.5	19.5
2022–23	(Italy) Olimpia Milano	LBA	14	22.6	.452	.348	.885	4.1	1.6	.7	.1	11.9
2023–24	(France) ASVEL	LNB Élite	38	23.7	.471	.343	.825	3.6	2.1	.4	.1	12.4
2024–25	(Spain) Baskonia	ACB	34	23.6	.453	.395	.822	2.8	1.8	.6	.2	11.4
2025–26	(Spain) Baskonia	ACB	33	22.5	.461	.393	.901	3.6	1.7	.9	.1	18.1

== See also ==
- List of foreign basketball players in Serbia
- List of NBA drafted players from Serbia
