= Michael Ružić =

French-Croatian basketball player (born 2006)

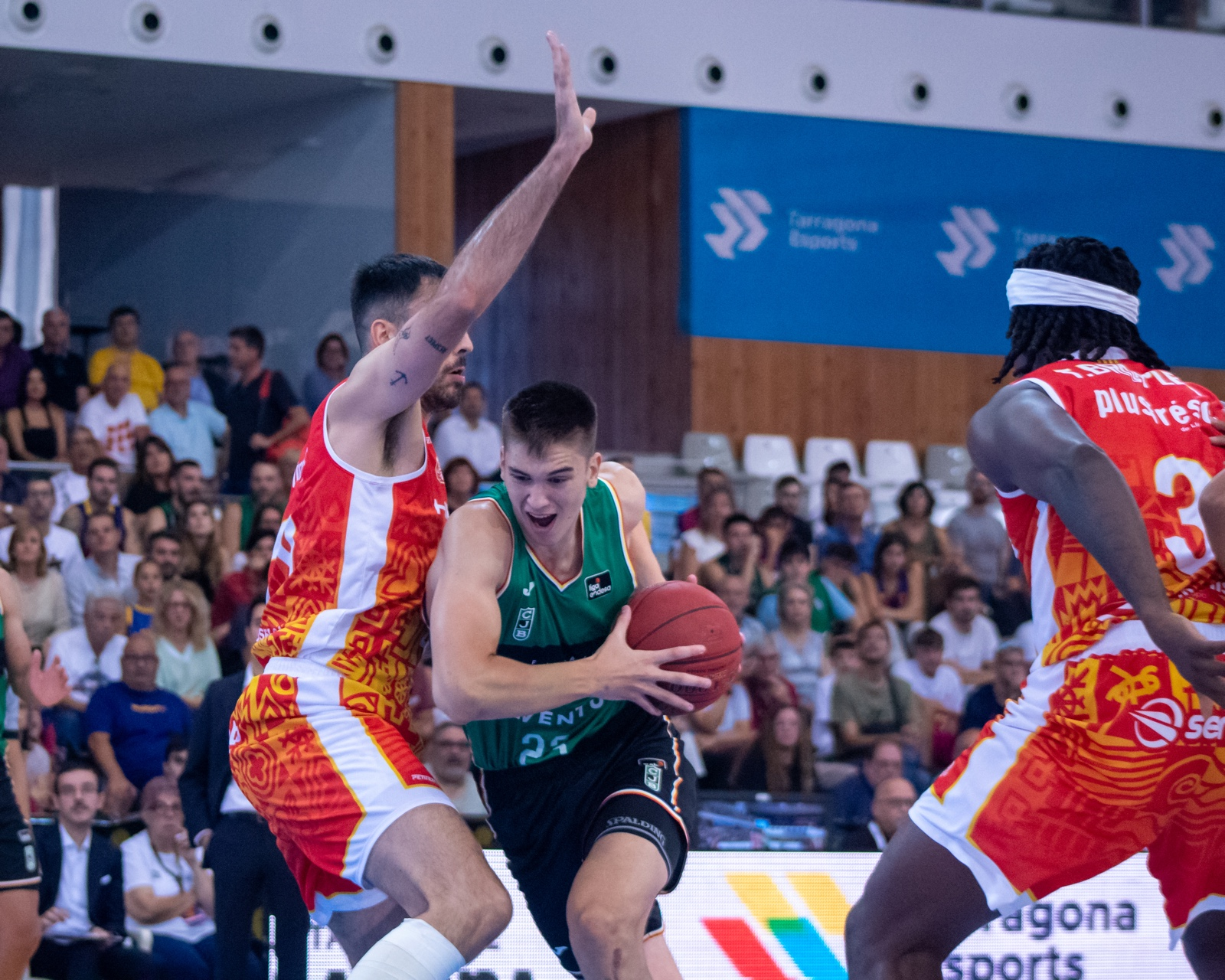
- Ružić with Joventut Badalona in 2024

No. 32 – LSU Tigers
- Position: Center
- League: Southeastern Conference

Personal information
- Born: 4 October 2006 (age 20) Besançon, France
- Listed height: 7 ft 0 in (2.13 m)
- Listed weight: 240 lb (109 kg)

Career information
- College: LSU (2026–present)
- Playing career: 2023–present

Career history
- 2023: Prat
- 2023–2026: Joventut Badalona

Career highlights
- All-Liga ACB Young Players Team (2026)

Michael Ružić (born 4 October 2006) is a French-Croatian college basketball player for the LSU Tigers of the Southeastern Conference (SEC). He previously played basketball for Joventut Badalona.

== Early life ==
Ružić was born on 4 October 2006 in Besançon, France, to Croatian parents. He received his name for Michael Jordan and Michael Schumacher. His father, Tomislav Ružić, played basketball while his mother, Barbara Jelić-Ružić, played volleyball and is considered one of the best Croatian volleyball players of all time. His grandfather, Ivica Jelić, competed in volleyball at the 1980 Summer Olympics, his aunt, Vesna Jelić, competed at the 2000 Summer Olympics, and an uncle, Jurica Ružić, played for the national basketball team.

As a youth, Ružić played in Zadar, Croatia, for junior teams of the club KK Zadar. At age 14, he played in the league for those a year older and led his team to the pre-cadet championship, scoring 12 points in the final. In 2022–23, he led KK Zadar to the cadet championship and participated at the junior championship. He also competed at the Euroleague Basketball Next Generation Tournament with the club and averaged 19 points, while he also averaged 18 in the regional junior league.

== Basketball career ==
Ružić was a highly regarded recruit and departed KK Zadar for Joventut Badalona in Spain in June 2023. He started with the junior team, CB Prat, where he appeared in six games and averaged 10.0 points. After injuries to players for the senior team, he was promoted and made his debut on 31 October 2023, in a EuroCup Basketball game. He remained with the first team and made his Liga ACB debut in November, becoming the sixth-youngest player in team history. He ended up playing in 26 games for Joventut during the 2023–24 season, finishing with averages of 4.9 points and 3.0 rebounds per game. He had one game with a double-double and became only the second player in team history to do it under the age of 18.

In June 2024, he participated in the Adidas Eurocamp and was named one of the competition's "Rising Stars" after averaging 17 points and 4.6 rebounds.

== International career ==
Ružić played with the Croatian national under-16 team at the 2022 FIBA U16 European Championship, where he averaged 7.0 points and 5.4 rebounds in seven games.
