= ACB Best Defender =

The ACB Best Defender is an annual award given since the 2020–21 season to the best defensive player in the Liga ACB, the top-tier professional basketball league in Spain. Edy Tavares has won the award in every season since its inception.

== Winners ==
Season	Player	Position	Nationality	Team	Ref.
2020–21	Edy Tavares	Center	Cape Verde	Real Madrid	
2021–22	Edy Tavares (2x)	Center	Cape Verde	Real Madrid	
2022–23	Edy Tavares (3x)	Center	Cape Verde	Real Madrid	
2023–24	Edy Tavares (4x)	Center	Cape Verde	Real Madrid	
2024–25	Edy Tavares (5x)	Center	Cape Verde	Real Madrid	
2025–26	Edy Tavares (6x)	Center	Cape Verde	Real Madrid	
