= Roig Arena =

Multipurpose venue in Valencia, Spain

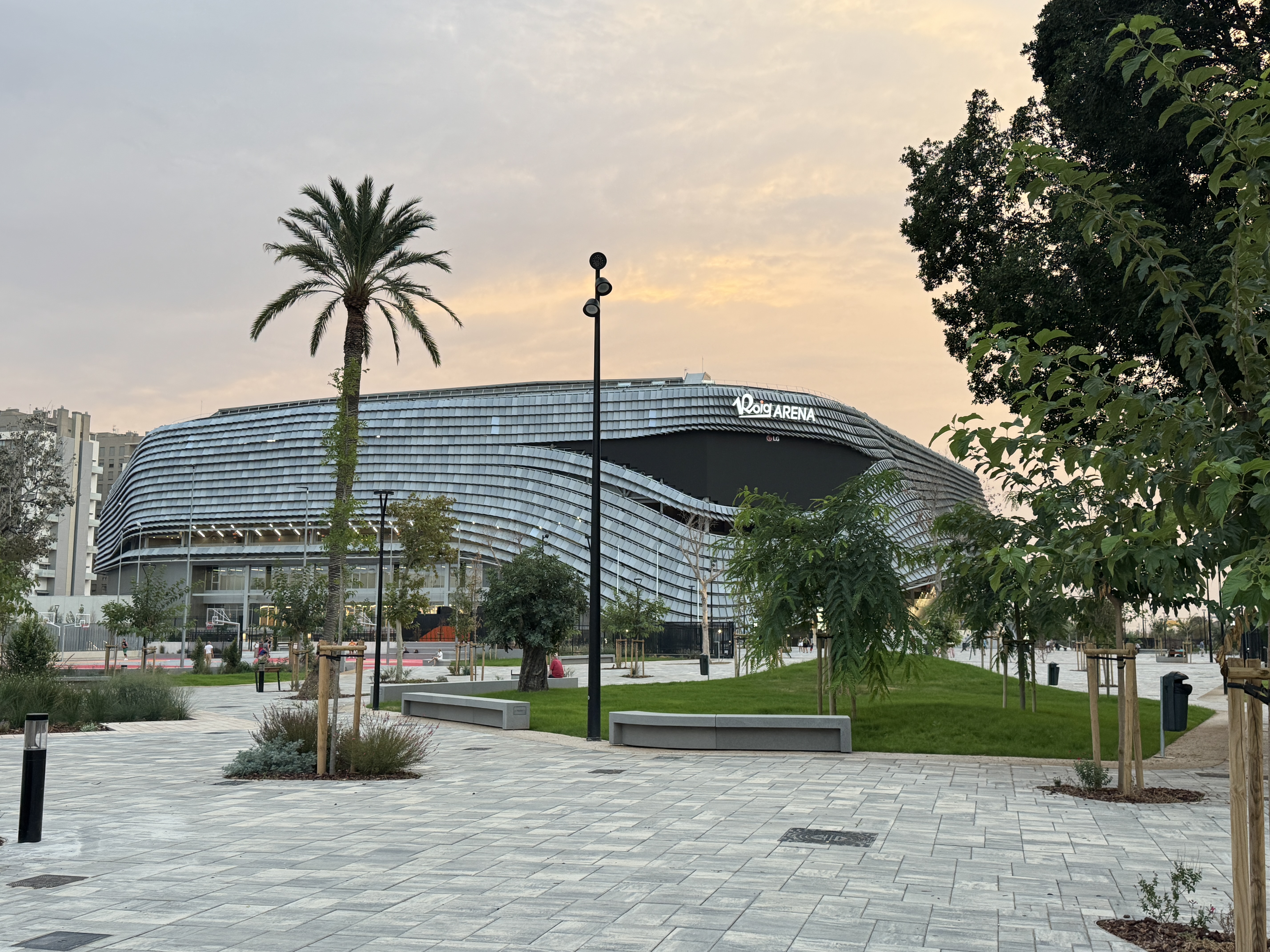
- View of the northwest of the Roig Arena
- Interactive map of Roig Arena
- Former names: Valencia Arena; Casal España Arena
- Location: Valencia, Spain
- Coordinates: 39°26′57.16″N 0°21′51.34″W
- Capacity: 15,600 (seated); 20,000 (including floor)
- Record attendance: 15,600 (13 May 2026 Valencia vs Panathinaikos in 2026 EuroLeague Playoffs)

Construction
- Groundbreaking: 29 June 2020
- Opened: 6 September 2025
- Cost: €400 million
- General contractor: Licampa 1617 S.L.

Tenant
- Valencia Basket (2025–present)

Website
- Official website

Roig Arena (Valencian: [ˈrɔdʒ aˈɾena]), previously proposed as Casal España Arena or Valencia Arena, is a multi-purpose indoor arena in Valencia, Spain, that opened in September 2025.

== History ==
The plot is located between the streets Ángel Villena, Bomber Ramón Duart and Antonio Ferrandis, next to La Fonteta; it was used as a parking lot for the attendants to the former venue and L'Alqueria. The arena is being funded by Juan Roig, who created the company Licampa 1617 S.L. to carry out the project. After a fifty-year concession, the facilities will revert to the municipality. It will host matches for the 2028 European Men's Handball Championship.

The venue has a capacity of 15,600 for basketball fixtures, of 18,600 for 180° concerts and of 20,000 for 360° shows. It also features around 1,300 parking spaces.

The arena was designed by ERRE and HOK. Building works started on 29 June 2020 and ended on 5 September 2025.

In 2020, the arena was expected to open in 2023, but was later delayed to 2025, and it was finally opened on 6 September 2025. It replaced La Fonteta as the main venue of Valencia Basket.

== Gallery ==
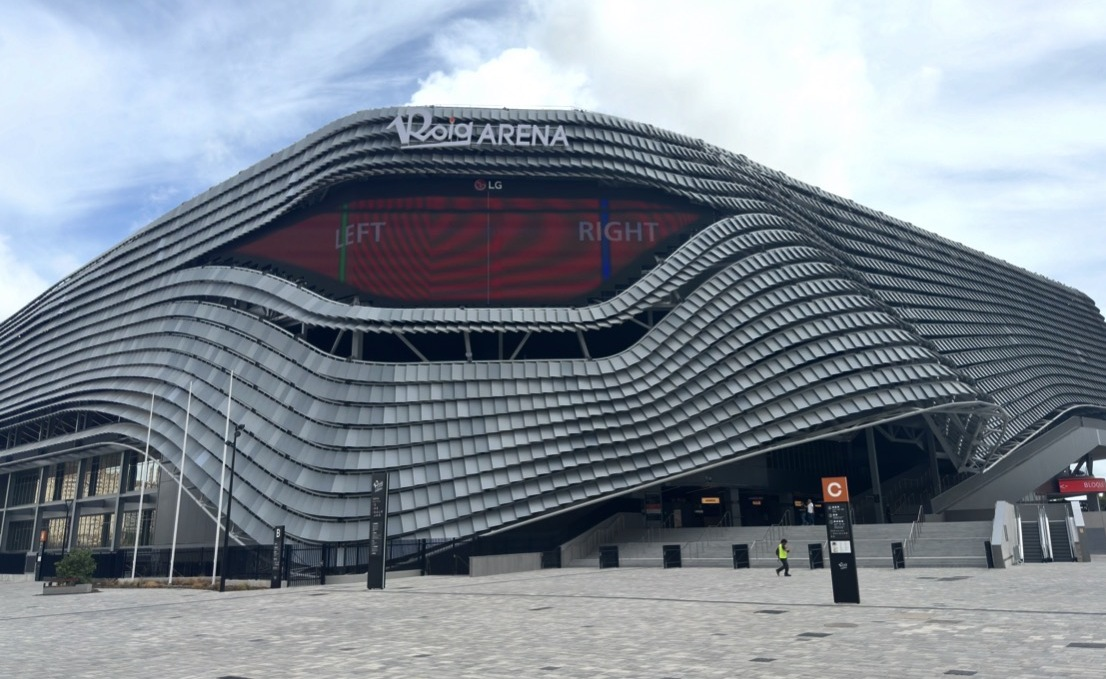

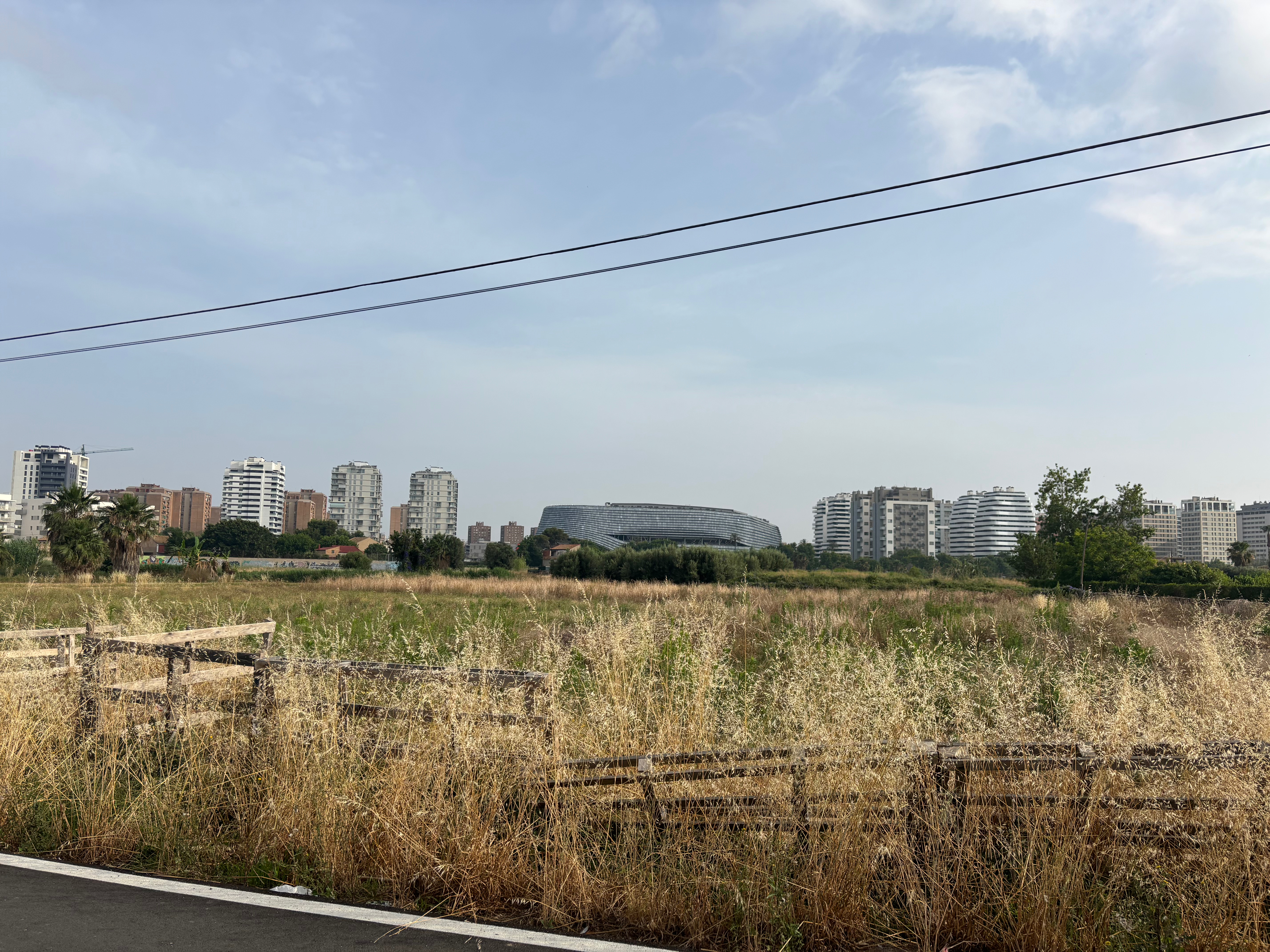

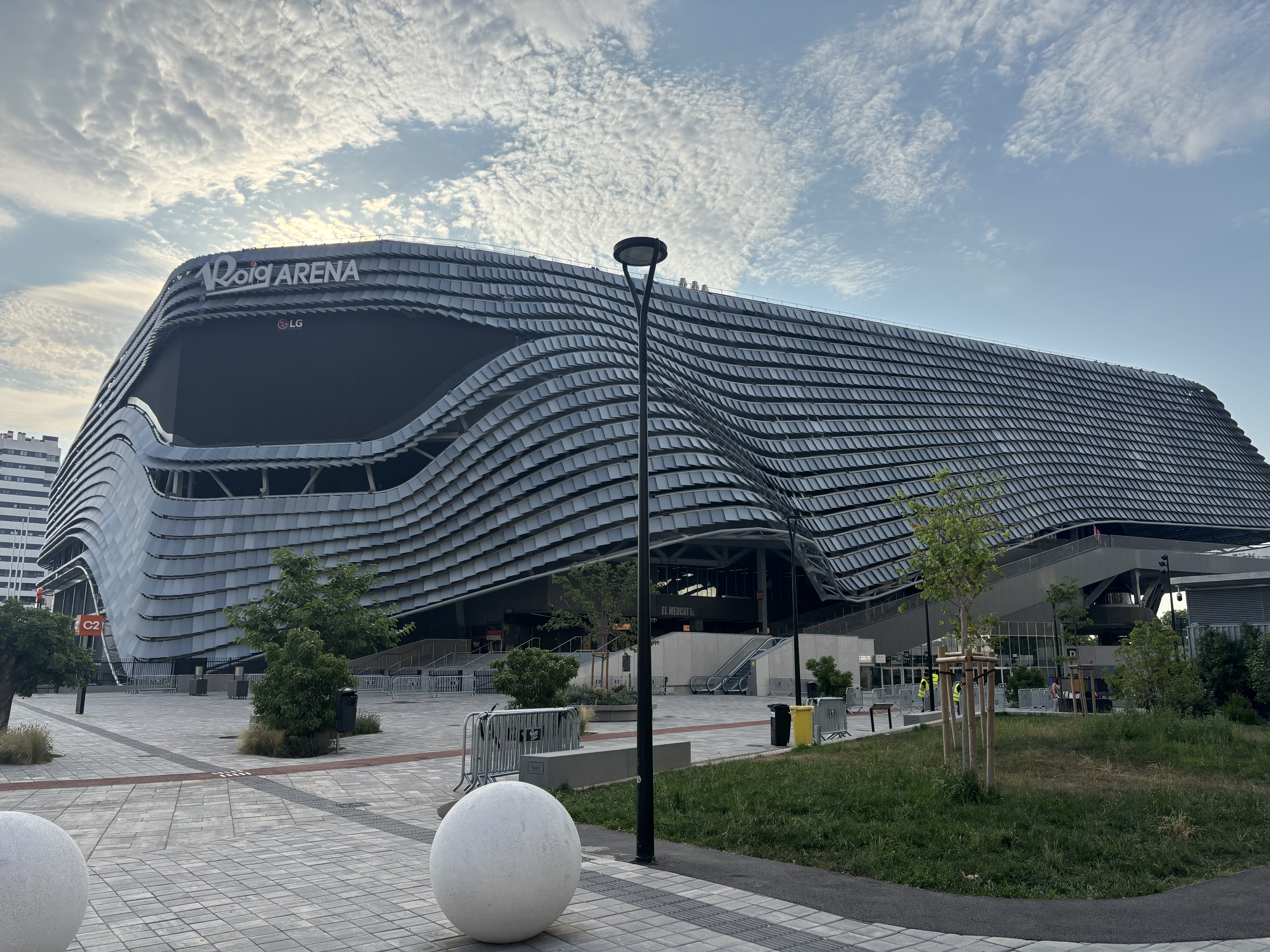

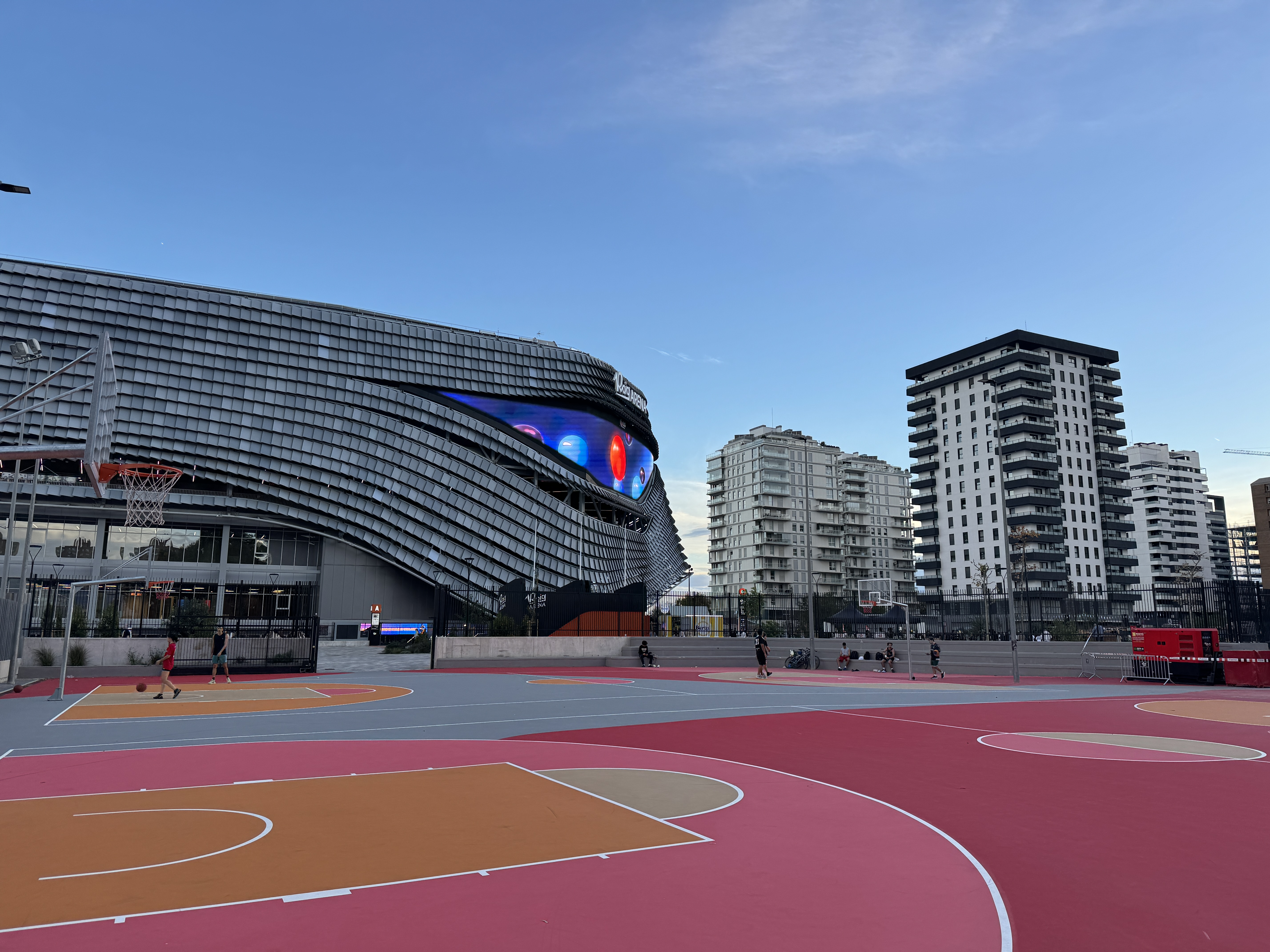

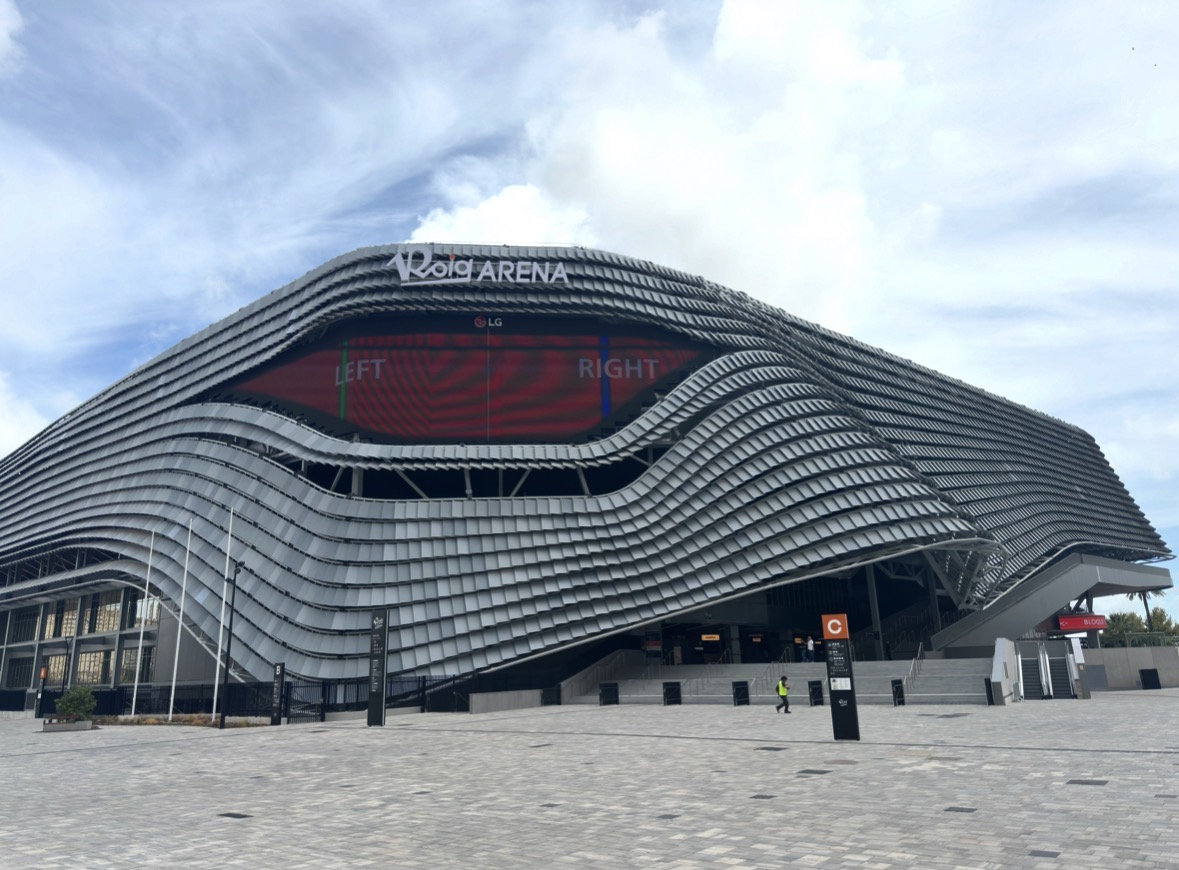

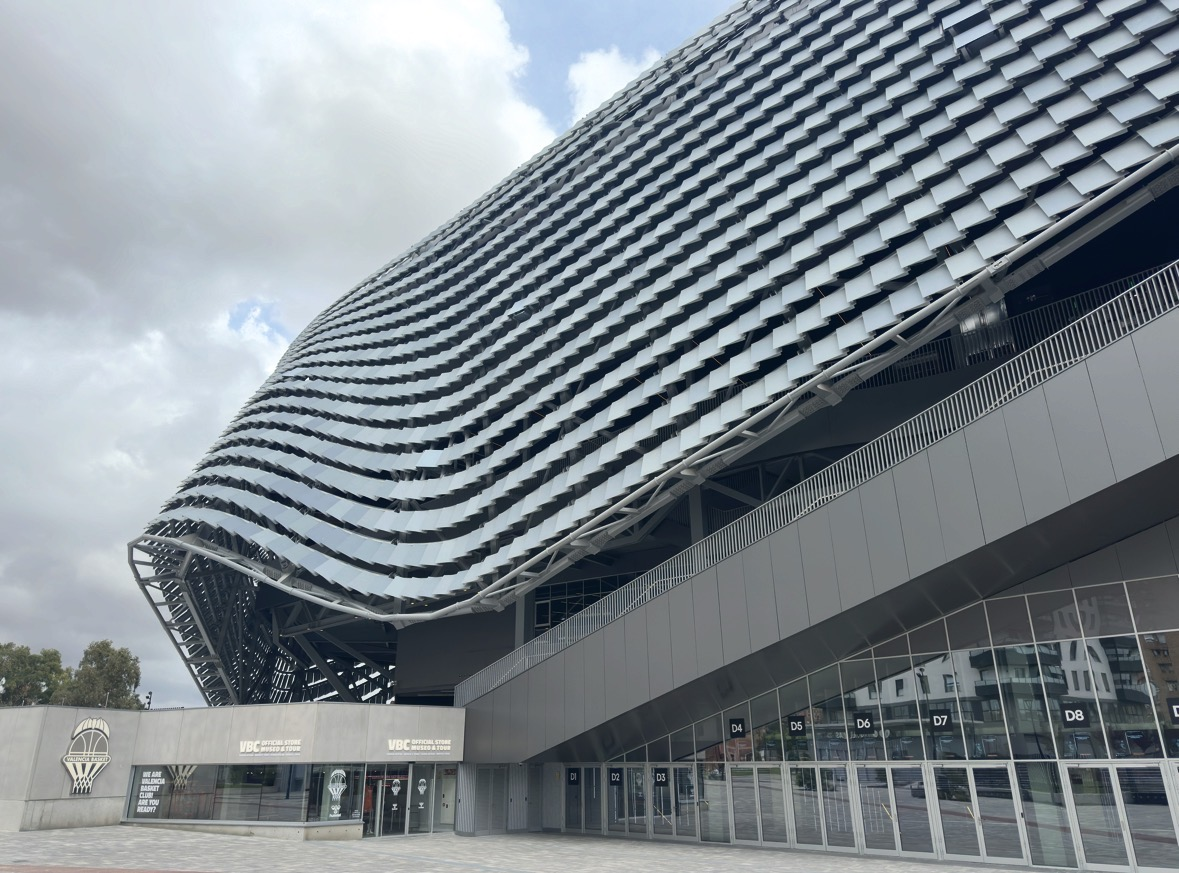

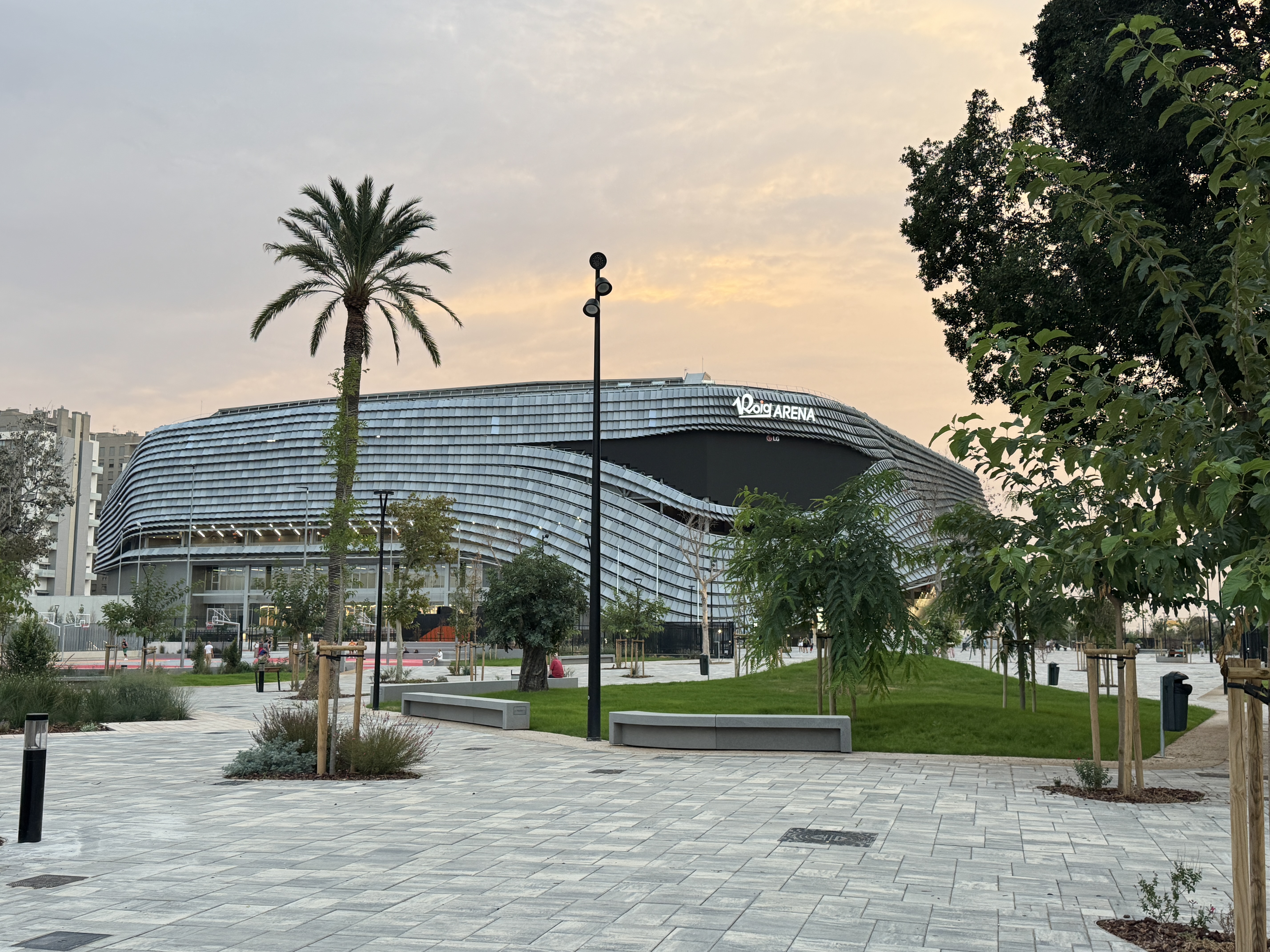

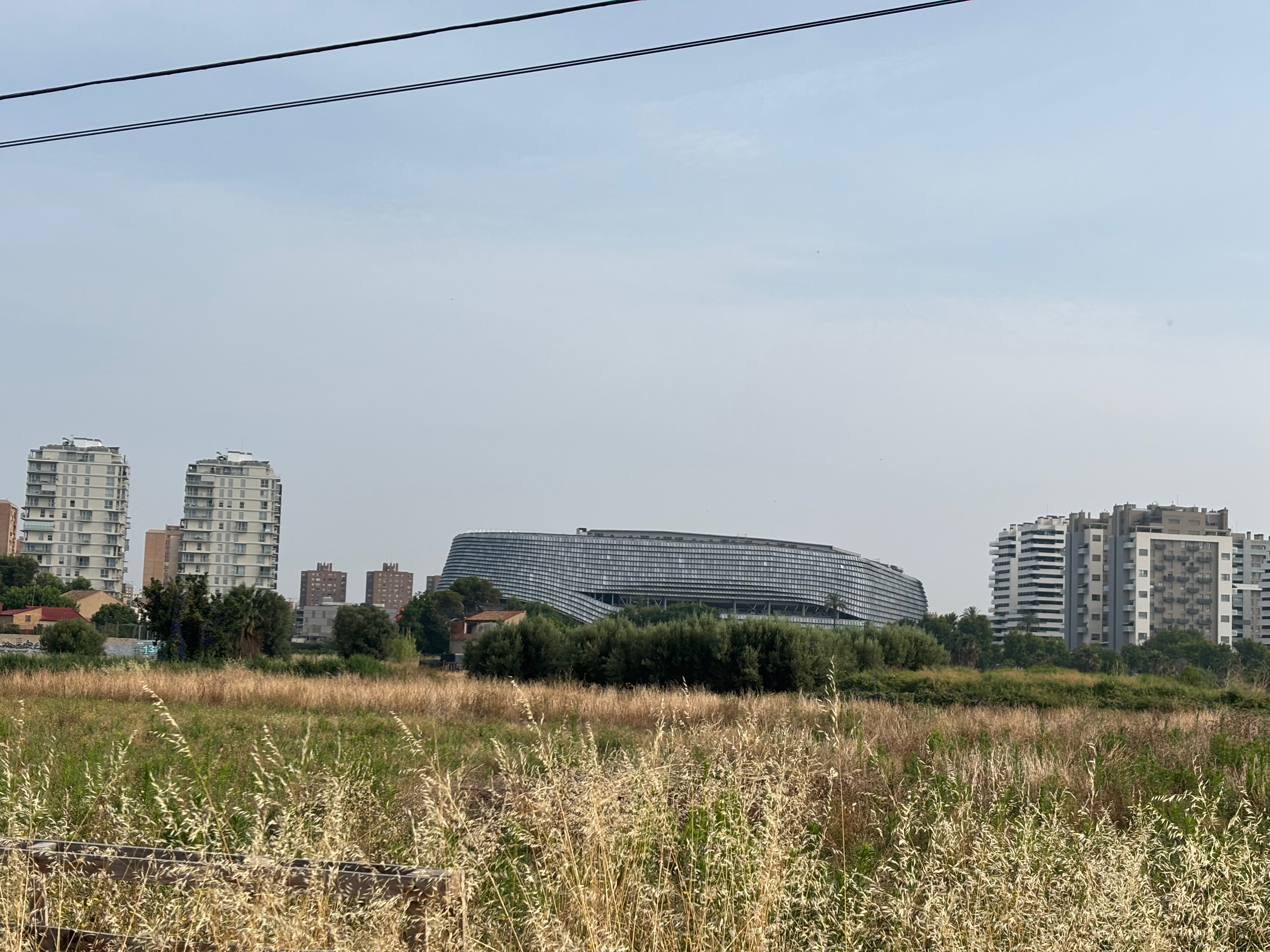

== See also ==
- List of indoor arenas in Spain
