= 2020–21 Real Madrid Baloncesto season =

Real Madrid
2020–21 season
- President: (Spain) Florentino Pérez
- Head coach: (Spain) Pablo Laso
- Arena: WiZink Center
- Liga ACB: Runners-up
- EuroLeague: Playoffs
- Copa del Rey: Runners-up
- Supercopa de España: Winners
- Biggest win: Real Madrid 97–71 Acunsa GBC (4 April 2021); Fenerbahçe 67–93 Real Madrid (8 April 2021)
- Biggest defeat: Anadolu Efes 90–63 Real Madrid (20 April 2021)
Home	Away

The 2020–21 season was Real Madrid's 90th in existence, their 65th consecutive season in the top flight of Spanish basketball and 14th consecutive season in the EuroLeague. It was also the tenth season in a row under head coach Pablo Laso.

Times up to 24 October 2020 and from 28 March 2021 were CEST (UTC+2). Times from 25 October 2020 to 27 March 2021 were CET (UTC+1).

== Overview ==
=== Pre-season ===
Real Madrid started up its hunt for its 11th Turkish Airlines EuroLeague crown with the beginning of training camp for the 2020–21 season. Madrid head coach Pablo Laso called together his team knowing he won't have a lot of new faces to incorporate. Madrid did not make many major changes during the off-season as Laso retained nearly his enter roster from last season, when the team went 22–6 in the EuroLeague for second place when the season was halted by the COVID-19 pandemic. Real Madrid opened the EuroLeague Regular Season on October 2 with a road game against TD Systems Baskonia.

== Players ==
=== Squad information ===
Note: Flags indicate national team eligibility at FIBA-sanctioned events. Players may hold other non-FIBA nationalities not displayed.

Real Madrid roster
Players
Coaches

Pos.	No.	Nat.	Name	Ht.	Age
SF	6	(Spain)	Abalde, Alberto	2.02 m (6 ft 8 in)	29 – 15 December 1995
PG	12	(Spain)	Alocén, Carlos	1.94 m (6 ft 4 in)	20 – 30 December 2000
SG	20	(Azerbaijan)	Carroll, Jaycee	1.88 m (6 ft 2 in)	38 – 16 April 1983
SG	1	(France)	Causeur, Fabien	1.95 m (6 ft 5 in)	33 – 16 June 1987
G/F	5	(Spain)	Fernández, Rudy	1.96 m (6 ft 5 in)	36 – 4 April 1985
F/C	16	(Spain)	Garuba, Usman	2.03 m (6 ft 8 in)	19 – 9 March 2002
PG	8	(Argentina)	Laprovíttola, Nicolás	1.90 m (6 ft 3 in)	31 – 31 January 1990
G	23	(Spain)	Llull, Sergio	1.90 m (6 ft 3 in)	33 – 15 November 1987
C	17	(France)	Poirier, Vincent	2.13 m (7 ft 0 in)	27 – 17 October 1993
PF	3	(Slovenia)	Randolph, Anthony (injured)	2.11 m (6 ft 11 in)	31 – 15 July 1989
F/C	9	(Spain)	Reyes, Felipe (C)	2.04 m (6 ft 8 in)	41 – 16 March 1980
C	22	(Cape Verde)	Tavares, Edy	2.21 m (7 ft 3 in)	29 – 22 March 1992
G/F	44	(Sweden)	Taylor, Jeffery	2.01 m (6 ft 7 in)	32 – 23 May 1989
PF	33	(United States)	Thompkins, Trey	2.08 m (6 ft 10 in)	31 – 29 May 1990
F/C	7	(Israel)	Tyus, Alex	2.03 m (6 ft 8 in)	33 – 8 January 1988
F/C	11	(Serbia)	Vukčević, Tristan	2.09 m (6 ft 10 in)	18 – 11 March 2003

Head coach

- (Spain) Pablo Laso

Assistant coach(es)

- (Spain) Jesús Mateo
- (Spain) Paco Redondo
- (Spain) Isidoro Calin

Athletic trainer(s)

- (Spain) Juan Trapero

Legend

- (C) Team captain
- Injured

- Roster
Updated: June 5, 2021

=== Depth chart ===
Pos.	Starting 5	Bench 1	Bench 2	Bench 3
C	Edy Tavares	Vincent Poirier	Alex Tyus	Felipe Reyes
PF	Trey Thompkins	Usman Garuba	Tristan Vukčević	Anthony Randolph (injured)
SF	Alberto Abalde	Rudy Fernández
SG	Fabien Causeur	Jeffery Taylor	Jaycee Carroll
PG	Nicolás Laprovíttola	Sergio Llull	Carlos Alocén

Colours: Blue = homegrown player; Red = non–FIBA Europe player

=== Transactions ===
==== In ====
No.	Pos.	Nat.	Name	Age	Moving from		Type	Ends	Transfer fee	Date	Source
25	SG	(Slovenia)	Klemen Prepelič	27	Club Joventut Badalona	(Spain)	Loan return	June 2020	Free	1 July 2020	
12	PG	(Spain)	Carlos Alocén	19	Casademont Zaragoza	(Spain)	Loan return	June 2024	Free	15 July 2020	
6	SF	(Spain)	Alberto Abalde	24	Valencia Basket	(Spain)	Transfer	June 2025	€1,500,000	21 July 2020	
7	C	(Israel)	Alex Tyus	32	Galatasaray	(Turkey)	Transfer	June 2021	$125,000	5 January 2021	
17	C	(France)	Vincent Poirier	27	Free agent		Transfer	June 2024	Free	12 April 2021	

==== Out ====
No.	Pos.	Nat.	Name	Age	Moving to		Type	Transfer fee	Date	Source
50	C	(Tunisia)	Salah Mejri	34	Free agent		End of contract	Free	1 July 2020	
25	SG	(Slovenia)	Klemen Prepelič	27	Valencia Basket	(Spain)	End of contract	Free	4 July 2020	
17	SF	(Serbia)	Mario Nakić	19	Filou Oostende	(Belgium)	Loan	Free	10 July 2020	
25	C	(United States)	Jordan Mickey	26	Khimki	(Russia)	Transfer	Free	21 July 2020	
7	PG	(Argentina)	Facundo Campazzo	29	Denver Nuggets	(United States)	Transfer	€6,000,000	26 November 2020	
35	SF	(Croatia)	Boris Tišma	18	Coosur Real Betis	(Spain)	Loan	Free	9 February 2021	
14	SF	(Argentina)	Gabriel Deck	26	Oklahoma City Thunder	(United States)	Transfer	€2,000,000	13 April 2021	

== Pre-season and friendlies ==
=== Friendly matches ===
29 August 2020	Real Madrid	79–69	Movistar Estudiantes	Madrid
18:00	Scoring by quarter: 24–24, 16–10, 19–10, 20–25
	Pts: Tavares 12	Boxscore	Pts: Avramović 27	Arena: Ciudad Real Madrid; Attendance: 0

2 September 2020	Real Madrid	68–66	Coosur Real Betis	Madrid
15:00	Scoring by quarter: 18–18, 21–20, 19–8, 10–20
	Pts: Taylor 13	Boxscore	Pts: Kay 23	Arena: Ciudad Real Madrid; Attendance: 0

3 September 2020	Real Madrid	88–73	TD Systems Baskonia	Madrid
17:00	Scoring by quarter: 16–25, 29–21, 21–6, 22–21
	Pts: Campazzo 14; Rebs: Randolph 7 Asts: Campazzo 7 PIR: three players 15	Boxscore	Pts: Henry 18; Rebs: Polonara 6 Asts: Henry 5 PIR: Henry 29	Arena: Ciudad Real Madrid; Attendance: 0

5 September 2020	Real Madrid	91–75	Casademont Zaragoza	Madrid
13:00	Scoring by quarter: 19–9, 22–26, 29–22, 21–18
	Pts: Thompkins 13	Boxscore	Pts: Ennis 18	Arena: Ciudad Real Madrid; Attendance: 0

== Competitions ==
=== Overview ===
Competition	First match	Last match	Starting round	Final position	Record							
Competition	First match	Last match	Starting round	Final position	Pld	W	D	L	PF	PA	PD	Win %
Liga ACB	19 September 2020	15 June 2021	Round 1	Runners-up	43	38	0	5	3,692	3,308	+384	88.37
EuroLeague	2 October 2020	4 May 2021	Round 1	Playoffs	39	22	0	17	3,043	3,014	+29	56.41
Copa del Rey	11 February 2021	14 February 2021	Quarterfinals	Runners-up	3	2	0	1	243	241	+2	66.67
Supercopa de España	12 September 2020	13 September 2020	Semifinals	Winners	2	2	0	0	164	146	+18	100.00
Total					87	64	0	23	7,142	6,709	+433	73.56

Source: Competitions

=== Liga ACB ===
==== League table ====
Pos	Team	Pld	W	L	PF	PA	PD	Qualification or relegation
1	Real Madrid	36	34	2	3132	2741	+391	Qualification to playoffs
2	Barça	36	32	4	3162	2621	+541	Qualification to playoffs
3	Lenovo Tenerife	36	27	9	3147	2861	+286	Qualification to playoffs
4	Valencia Basket	36	24	12	3107	2917	+190	Qualification to playoffs
5	TD Systems Baskonia	36	23	13	2952	2814	+138	Qualification to playoffs

Source: ACB
Rules for classification: 1) Win–loss record; 2) Head–to–head record; 3) Head–to–head point difference; 4) Point difference; 5) Points scored; 6) Sum of quotients of points scored (Note: Head–to–head record is used only after all the matches between the teams in question have been played)

==== Results summary ====
Overall						Home					Away				
Pld	W	L	PF	PA	PD	W	L	PF	PA	PD	W	L	PF	PA	PD
36	34	2	3132	2741	+391	15	2	1499	1328	+171	19	0	1633	1413	+220

Source: Competitive matches

==== Results by round ====
Round	1	2	3	4	5	6	7	8	9	10	11	12	13	14	15	16	17	18	19	20	21	22	23	24	25	26	27	28	29	30	31	32	33	34	35	36	37	38
Ground	A	H	A	A	H	A	H	A	A	H	A	H	A	H	R	H	H	A	H	A	H	H	A	H	A	A	H	A	H	A	H	H	A	R	A	H	H	A
Result	W	W	W	W	W	W	W	W	W	W	W	W	W	W	R	L	W	W	W	W	W	W	W	W	W	W	W	W	W	W	W	W	W	R	W	L	W	W
Position	3	1	1	1	1	1	1	1	1	1	1	1	1	1	1	1	1	1	1	1	1	1	1	1	1	1	1	1	1	1	1	1	1	1	1	1	1	1

Source: Competitive matches
A = Away; H = Home; W = Win; L = Loss; R = Rest

==== Matches ====
19 September 2020 1	Acunsa GBC	70–86	Real Madrid	Bilbao
20:45	Scoring by quarter: 21–25, 20–16, 12–25, 17–20
	Pts: Faggiano 13; Rebs: Tomàs 10; Asts: Oroz, Špan 3 PIR: Magarity 17	Boxscore	Pts: Llull 18; Rebs: Tavares 6 Asts: Laprovíttola 6 PIR: Laprovíttola 17	Arena: Bilbao Arena; Attendance: 0 Referees: Esperanza Mendoza, Jorge Martínez, Carlos Cortés

25 September 2020 2	Real Madrid	102–83	Casademont Zaragoza	Madrid
21:45	Scoring by quarter: 26–13, 21–28, 28–17, 27–25
	Pts: Causeur 25; Rebs: Abalde, Campazzo 6 Asts: Alocén, Campazzo 5 PIR: Causeur 24	Boxscore	Pts: Sulaimon 18; Rebs: Hlinason 8 Asts: San Miguel 7 PIR: Brussino 21	Arena: WiZink Center; Attendance: 0 Referees: Luis Miguel Castillo, Juan de Dios Oyón, David Sánchez

27 September 2020 3	Joventut	64–87	Real Madrid	Badalona
18:00	Scoring by quarter: 9–20, 14–22, 12–21, 29–24
	Pts: López-Arostegui 12; Rebs: three players 5 Asts: Bassas 4 PIR: López-Arostegui 15	Boxscore	Pts: Laprovíttola 22; Rebs: Tavares 8 Asts: Campazzo 7 PIR: Laprovíttola 31	Arena: Palau Municipal d'Esports; Attendance: 0 Referees: Yasmina Alcaraz, Martín Caballero, Daniel Hierrezuelo

11 October 2020 4	Herbalife Gran Canaria	65–90	Real Madrid	Las Palmas
18:30	Scoring by quarter: 12–18, 22–26, 11–20, 20–26
	Pts: Okoye 12; Rebs: Costello 5 Asts: Albicy 3 PIR: Albicy 12	Boxscore	Pts: Tavares 15; Rebs: Garuba 10; Asts: Campazzo 8 PIR: Campazzo 24	Arena: Gran Canaria Arena; Attendance: 0 Referees: Roberto Lucas, Sergio Manuel, Juan Carlos García

20 October 2020 5	Real Madrid	84–77	Monbus Obradoiro	Madrid
21:15	Scoring by quarter: 23–25, 17–19, 21–10, 23–23
	Pts: Laprovíttola 19; Rebs: Tavares 9 Asts: Campazzo, Thompkins 3 PIR: Tavares 27	Boxscore	Pts: Robertson 26; Rebs: Czerapowicz 5 Asts: Beliauskas, Pozas 4 PIR: Beliauskas, Robertson 18	Arena: WiZink Center; Attendance: 0 Referees: Andrés Fernández, Francisco Araña, Fernando Calatrava

25 October 2020 7	Real Madrid	93–77	Movistar Estudiantes	Madrid
18:30	Scoring by quarter: 18–23, 26–11, 25–10, 24–33
	Pts: Campazzo 15; Rebs: Garuba 10; Asts: Laprovíttola 5 PIR: Campazzo 22	Boxscore	Pts: Roberson 15; Rebs: Gentile 6 Asts: three players 3 PIR: Roberson 16	Arena: WiZink Center; Attendance: 0 Referees: Carlos Merino, Alberto Sánchez, Jordi Aliaga

30 October 2020 8	Coosur Real Betis	65–84	Real Madrid	Seville
18:30	Scoring by quarter: 17–19, 14–12, 18–26, 16–27
	Pts: Feldeine 11; Rebs: Ndoye 10; Asts: Campbell 5 PIR: Ndoye 23	Boxscore	Pts: Carroll, Llull 14; Rebs: Tavares 11; Asts: Campazzo 9 PIR: Tavares 20	Arena: San Pablo; Attendance: 0 Referees: Cristóbal Sánchez, Martín Caballero, Óscar Perea

1 November 2020 9	Valencia Basket	78–86	Real Madrid	Valencia
18:30	Scoring by quarter: 6–28, 19–22, 30–20, 23–16
	Pts: Labeyrie 26; Rebs: four players 4 Asts: Van Rossom 6 PIR: Labeyrie 32	Boxscore	Pts: Carroll 17; Rebs: Randolph 7 Asts: Campazzo 4 PIR: Thompkins 22	Arena: La Fonteta; Attendance: 0 Referees: Joaquín García, Arnau Padrós, Antonio Conde

4 November 2020 6	RETAbet Bilbao Basket	83–85	Real Madrid	Bilbao
21:15	Scoring by quarter: 12–23, 17–21, 31–14, 23–27
	Pts: Balvín 18; Rebs: Balvín 6 Asts: Rousselle 4 PIR: Balvín 21	Boxscore	Pts: Thompkins 16; Rebs: Garuba 10; Asts: Alocén 5 PIR: Thompkins 22	Arena: Bilbao Arena; Attendance: 0 Referees: Rubén Sánchez, Javier Torres, Carlos Peruga

8 November 2020 10	Real Madrid	79–68	Urbas Fuenlabrada	Madrid
12:30	Scoring by quarter: 18–24, 15–16, 28–11, 18–17
	Pts: Carroll 18; Rebs: Tavares 10; Asts: Laprovíttola 5 PIR: Tavares 19	Boxscore	Pts: Trimble 23; Rebs: four players 5 Asts: Meindl 4 PIR: Trimble 16	Arena: WiZink Center; Attendance: 0 Referees: Vicente Martínez, Francisco Araña, Carlos Cortés

22 November 2020 12	Real Madrid	100–78	Baxi Manresa	Madrid
21:15	Scoring by quarter: 25–18, 22–22, 26–18, 27–20
	Pts: Campazzo 20; Rebs: Tavares 10; Asts: Tavares 4 PIR: Tavares 28	Boxscore	Pts: Eatherton 16; Rebs: Eatherton 6 Asts: Pérez 6 PIR: Vaulet 17	Arena: WiZink Center; Attendance: 0 Referees: Joaquín García, Jorge Martínez, Óscar Perea

2 December 2020 17	Real Madrid	92–83	TD Systems Baskonia	Madrid
21:15	Scoring by quarter: 25–19, 15–24, 28–15, 24–25
	Pts: Causeur 21; Rebs: three players 5 Asts: Laprovíttola 5 PIR: Causeur 27	Boxscore	Pts: Henry 21; Rebs: Polonara 8 Asts: Henry 6 PIR: Henry 20	Arena: WiZink Center; Attendance: 0 Referees: Carlos Peruga, Arnau Padrós, Cristóbal Sánchez

6 December 2020 13	Hereda San Pablo Burgos	60–74	Real Madrid	Burgos
18:30	Scoring by quarter: 16–17, 13–17, 12–22, 19–18
	Pts: Kravić 14; Rebs: Horton 6 Asts: Cook 4 PIR: Kravić 10	Boxscore	Pts: Laprovíttola 13; Rebs: Deck 7 Asts: Causeur, Llull 2 PIR: Fernández, Thompkins 13	Arena: Coliseum Burgos; Attendance: 0 Referees: Carlos Cortés, Vicente Bultó, Alberto Baena

13 December 2020 14	Real Madrid	91–84	Unicaja	Madrid
18:30	Scoring by quarter: 20–16, 17–17, 30–25, 24–26
	Pts: Tavares 18; Rebs: Tavares 8 Asts: Llull 4 PIR: Deck, Tavares 24	Boxscore	Pts: Alonso 27; Rebs: Guerrero 7 Asts: Brizuela 6 PIR: Brizuela 26	Arena: WiZink Center; Attendance: 0 Referees: Fernando Calatrava, Javier Torres, Rubén Sánchez

27 December 2020 16	Real Madrid	82–87	Barça	Madrid
21:30	Scoring by quarter: 22–23, 24–23, 19–18, 17–23
	Pts: Llull 14; Rebs: Tavares 11; Asts: Tavares 3 PIR: Tavares 23	Boxscore	Pts: Mirotić 26; Rebs: Mirotić 10; Asts: three players 3 PIR: Mirotić 41	Arena: WiZink Center; Attendance: 0 Referees: Emilio Pérez, Sergio Manuel, Arnau Padrós

2 January 2021 18	Iberostar Tenerife	85–92	Real Madrid	San Cristóbal de La Laguna
18:00	Scoring by quarter: 26–25, 19–19, 27–26, 13–22
	Pts: Shermadini 18; Rebs: Shermadini 8 Asts: Fitipaldo 8 PIR: Shermadini 25	Boxscore	Pts: Carroll 18; Rebs: Tavares 13; Asts: Thompkins 3 PIR: Tavares 29	Arena: Santiago Martín; Attendance: 0 Referees: Daniel Hierrezuelo, Jorge Martínez, Alfonso Olivares

4 January 2021 11	MoraBanc Andorra	69–75	Real Madrid	Andorra la Vella
18:30	Scoring by quarter: 17–23, 15–14, 15–14, 22–24
	Pts: Olumuyiwa, Hannah 13; Rebs: Paulí 7 Asts: Hannah 6 PIR: Olumuyiwa 22	Boxscore	Pts: Abalde 24; Rebs: Tavares 12; Asts: Abalde, Tavares 3 PIR: Abalde 27	Arena: M.I. Govern Andorra; Attendance: 0 Referees: Antonio Conde, Rafael Serrano, Carlos Merino

24 January 2021 21	Real Madrid	86–79	MoraBanc Andorra	Madrid
12:30	Scoring by quarter: 24–12, 27–26, 13–18, 22–23
	Pts: Tavares 16; Rebs: Tavares 13; Asts: Alocén, Deck 3 PIR: Tavares 32	Boxscore	Pts: Jelínek 16; Rebs: Dime 6 Asts: Hannah 6 PIR: Dime, Jelínek 15	Arena: WiZink Center; Attendance: 0 Referees: Óscar Perea, Luis Miguel Castillo, David Sánchez

31 January 2021 22	Real Madrid	81–80	Herbalife Gran Canaria	Madrid
20:00	Scoring by quarter: 16–15, 25–20, 22–22, 18–23
	Pts: Fernández, Causeur 15; Rebs: Deck 7 Asts: Causeur 4 PIR: Causeur 22	Boxscore	Pts: Okoye, Costello 14; Rebs: Shurna 8 Asts: Slaughter 6 PIR: Shurna 19	Arena: WiZink Center; Attendance: 0 Referees: Daniel Hierrezuelo, Raúl Zamorano, Esperanza Mendoza

2 February 2021 19	Real Madrid	98–87	UCAM Murcia	Madrid
20:30	Scoring by quarter: 24–32, 23–19, 26–9, 25–27
	Pts: Tavares 16; Rebs: Tavares 15; Asts: Causeur 4 PIR: Tavares 29	Boxscore	Pts: Frankamp 20; Rebs: Lima 8 Asts: Lima 5 PIR: Davis 20	Arena: WiZink Center; Attendance: 0 Referees: Emilio Pérez, Javier Torres, Iyán González

7 February 2021 23	Movistar Estudiantes	65–79	Real Madrid	Madrid
18:30	Scoring by quarter: 12–22, 23–13, 16–19, 14–25
	Pts: Avramović 21; Rebs: Delgado 11; Asts: Đurišić, Barea 3 PIR: Avramović 20	Boxscore	Pts: Carroll 17; Rebs: Tavares 10; Asts: Alocén 3 PIR: Causeur 21	Arena: WiZink Center; Attendance: 0 Referees: Carlos Cortés, Alberto Sánchez, Yasmina Alcaraz

28 February 2021 24	Real Madrid	96–81	Hereda San Pablo Burgos	Madrid
20:45	Scoring by quarter: 29–13, 19–19, 22–22, 26–27
	Pts: Tavares 27; Rebs: Tavares 7 Asts: Laprovíttola 9 PIR: Tavares 37	Boxscore	Pts: McFadden 18; Rebs: Rivero 8 Asts: Cook 5 PIR: Rivero 18	Arena: WiZink Center; Attendance: 0 Referees: Óscar Perea, Juan de Dios Oyón, Fabio Fernández

7 March 2021 25	UCAM Murcia	58–74	Real Madrid	Murcia
12:30	Scoring by quarter: 6–16, 18–14, 20–20, 14–24
	Pts: Cățe 17; Rebs: Cățe 7 Asts: Bellas 3 PIR: Cățe 21	Boxscore	Pts: Tavares 16; Rebs: Tavares, Deck 7 Asts: Abalde, Alocén 4 PIR: Tavares 17	Arena: Palacio de Deportes; Attendance: 0 Referees: Miguel Ángel Pérez, Sergio Manuel, Alberto Sánchez

14 March 2021 26	TD Systems Baskonia	74–85	Real Madrid	Vitoria-Gasteiz
18:30	Scoring by quarter: 20–27, 16–18, 24–21, 14–19
	Pts: Henry 14; Rebs: Giedraitis, Peters 4 Asts: Henry 11; PIR: Henry 20	Boxscore	Pts: Deck 18; Rebs: Tavares 12; Asts: Deck, Thompkins 4 PIR: Deck 22	Arena: Buesa Arena; Attendance: 0 Referees: Emilio Pérez, Vicente Bultó, Alfonso Olivares

21 March 2021 27	Real Madrid	95–77	Coosur Real Betis	Madrid
17:00	Scoring by quarter: 18–14, 28–24, 24–13, 25–26
	Pts: Laprovíttola 16; Rebs: Tavares 6 Asts: Thompkins, Laprovíttola 5 PIR: Laprovíttola 21	Boxscore	Pts: Ndoye, Randle 16; Rebs: Ndoye 13; Asts: Kay 4 PIR: Ndoye 21	Arena: WiZink Center; Attendance: 0 Referees: Jordi Aliaga, Arnau Padrós, Roberto Lucas

23 March 2021 20	Monbus Obradoiro	71–87	Real Madrid	Santiago de Compostela
18:00	Scoring by quarter: 16–23, 16–19, 17–16, 22–29
	Pts: Robertson 18; Rebs: Daum, Czerapowicz 6 Asts: Robertson 8 PIR: Enoch 21	Boxscore	Pts: Causeur, Laprovíttola 17; Rebs: Garuba, Tavares 8 Asts: Causeur, Laprovíttola 3 PIR: Causeur 22	Arena: Multiusos Fontes do Sar; Attendance: 0 Referees: Carlos Peruga, Rubén Sánchez, Cristóbal Sánchez

28 March 2021 28	Baxi Manresa	76–77	Real Madrid	Manresa
20:45	Scoring by quarter: 13–17, 19–18, 16–19, 28–23
	Pts: Eatherton 17; Rebs: Hinrichs 5 Asts: Ferrari, García 4 PIR: Eatherton 18	Boxscore	Pts: Deck 17; Rebs: Tavares 11; Asts: Alocén 7 PIR: Tavares 21	Arena: Nou Congost; Attendance: 0 Referees: Juan Carlos García, Javier Torres, Carlos Merino

4 April 2021 29	Real Madrid	97–71	Acunsa GBC	Madrid
20:00	Scoring by quarter: 18–15, 26–15, 23–16, 30–25
	Pts: Tyus 20; Rebs: Tyus 7 Asts: Laprovíttola 7 PIR: Laprovíttola 27	Boxscore	Pts: Radončić 19; Rebs: Radončić 11; Asts: Faggiano 5 PIR: Radončić 25	Arena: WiZink Center; Attendance: 0 Referees: Carlos Cortés, Francisco Araña, Iyán González

11 April 2021 30	Barça	85–87	Real Madrid	Barcelona
18:30	Scoring by quarter: 15–20, 18–22, 24–17, 28–28
	Pts: Higgins 21; Rebs: Hanga 5 Asts: Calathes 4 PIR: Calathes 23	Boxscore	Pts: Fernández 13; Rebs: Garuba 5 Asts: Laprovíttola 7 PIR: Fernández, Garuba 14	Arena: Palau Blaugrana; Attendance: 0 Referees: Antonio Conde, Juan de Dios Oyón, Martín Caballero

13 April 2021 31	Real Madrid	84–76	Lenovo Tenerife	Madrid
21:15	Scoring by quarter: 24–16, 14–22, 21–11, 25–27
	Pts: Laprovíttola 21; Rebs: Tavares 7 Asts: Laprovíttola 9 PIR: Laprovíttola 28	Boxscore	Pts: Huertas 23; Rebs: Sulejmanović 7 Asts: Fitipaldo 6 PIR: Shermadini 15	Arena: WiZink Center; Attendance: 0 Referees: Jordi Aliaga, Alberto Sánchez, Joaquín García

18 April 2021 32	Real Madrid	101–92	Joventut	Madrid
18:30	Scoring by quarter: 18–24, 26–23, 21–25, 36–20
	Pts: Llull 15; Rebs: Garuba 12; Asts: Abalde 7 PIR: Garuba 24	Boxscore	Pts: Ribas 20; Rebs: Parra 10; Asts: Bassas 7 PIR: Morgan 17	Arena: WiZink Center; Attendance: 0 Referees: Fernando Calatrava, Alberto Baena, Alfonso Olivares

25 April 2021 33	Urbas Fuenlabrada	76–90	Real Madrid	Fuenlabrada
18:30	Scoring by quarter: 22–23, 16–23, 18–20, 20–24
	Pts: Meindl 12; Rebs: Meindl 6 Asts: Novak 6 PIR: Novak 16	Boxscore	Pts: Carroll 20; Rebs: Tyus 11; Asts: Garuba, Alocén 5 PIR: Garuba, Fernández 18	Arena: Fernando Martín; Attendance: 0 Referees: Óscar Perea, Sergio Manuel, Jacobo Rial

2 May 2021 35	Casademont Zaragoza	89–98	Real Madrid	Zaragoza
18:30	Scoring by quarter: 31–19, 20–35, 24–19, 14–25
	Pts: Harris 23; Rebs: Wiley, Harris 6 Asts: Ennis 5 PIR: Harris 29	Boxscore	Pts: Laprovíttola 20; Rebs: Garuba 10; Asts: Laprovíttola 5 PIR: Fernández 22	Arena: Pabellón Príncipe Felipe; Attendance: 0 Referees: Antonio Conde, Raúl Zamorano, Fabio Fernández

9 May 2021 36	Real Madrid	69–79	Valencia Basket	Madrid
18:30	Scoring by quarter: 12–27, 15–16, 16–17, 26–19
	Pts: Poirier 16; Rebs: Poirier 7 Asts: three players 3 PIR: Poirier 19	Boxscore	Pts: Tobey 16; Rebs: Dubljević, Kalinić 9 Asts: Prepelič, Van Rossom 4 PIR: Labeyrie 17	Arena: WiZink Center; Attendance: 0 Referees: Carlos Cortés, Martín Caballero, Andrés Fernández

20 May 2021 37	Real Madrid	70–59	RETAbet Bilbao Basket	Madrid
21:15	Scoring by quarter: 21–13, 24–11, 8–18, 17–17
	Pts: Carroll 12; Rebs: Poirier 13; Asts: Abalde 3 PIR: Poirier 20	Boxscore	Pts: Balvín, Zyskowski 13; Rebs: Balvín 9 Asts: Håkanson 5 PIR: Balvín 18	Arena: WiZink Center; Attendance: 0 Referees: Daniel Hierrezuelo, Juan de Dios Oyón, Carlos Merino

23 May 2021 38	Unicaja	90–96	Real Madrid	Málaga
12:30	Scoring by quarter: 17–25, 22–20, 23–26, 28–25
	Pts: Thompson 16; Rebs: Thomas 8 Asts: Fernández 7 PIR: Abromaitis, Thomas 17	Boxscore	Pts: Carroll 22; Rebs: Poirier 9 Asts: Laprovíttola 8 PIR: Poirier 23	Arena: Martín Carpena; Attendance: 0 Referees: Antonio Conde, Arnau Padrós, Roberto Lucas

=== ACB Playoffs ===
Win Loss

==== Quarterfinals ====
31 May 2021 1	Real Madrid	103–79	Herbalife Gran Canaria	Madrid
19:45	Scoring by quarter: 34–11, 22–19, 22–34, 25–15
	Pts: three players 14; Rebs: Poirier 11; Asts: Laprovíttola 6 PIR: Poirier 26	Boxscore	Pts: Costello 23; Rebs: Stević 6 Asts: Albicy, Dimša 4 PIR: Costello 23	Arena: WiZink Center; Attendance: 0 Referees: Fernando Calatrava, Sergio Manuel, Rubén Sánchez

2 June 2021 2	Herbalife Gran Canaria	75–81	Real Madrid	Las Palmas
22:00	Scoring by quarter: 15–16, 20–21, 16–21, 24–23
	Pts: Slaughter 20; Rebs: Costello 11; Asts: Albicy 4 PIR: Slaughter 15	Boxscore	Pts: Fernández 15; Rebs: Tavares 12; Asts: three players 3 PIR: Fernández 17	Arena: Gran Canaria Arena; Attendance: 200; Referees: Carlos Peruga, Jorge Martínez, Esperanza Mendoza

==== Semifinals ====
6 June 2021 1	Real Madrid	81–70	Valencia Basket	Madrid
18:30	Scoring by quarter: 25–14, 19–24, 14–8, 23–24
	Pts: Causeur 24; Rebs: Garuba 12; Asts: Alocén 8 PIR: Tavares 27	Boxscore	Pts: Labeyrie, Hermannsson 11; Rebs: Dubljević 12; Asts: Kalinić 4 PIR: Dubljević 16	Arena: WiZink Center; Attendance: 1,000; Referees: Emilio Pérez, Jordi Aliaga, Luis Miguel Castillo

8 June 2021 2	Valencia Basket	85–67	Real Madrid	Valencia
21:15	Scoring by quarter: 24–18, 20–11, 20–19, 21–19
	Pts: Labeyrie 18; Rebs: Dubljević 7 Asts: Hermannsson 5 PIR: Labeyrie 22	Boxscore	Pts: Carroll 13; Rebs: Tyus 6 Asts: Alocén, Taylor 3 PIR: Tyus 12	Arena: La Fonteta; Attendance: 1,000; Referees: Carlos Peruga, Óscar Perea, Alberto Sánchez

10 June 2021 3	Real Madrid	80–77	Valencia Basket	Madrid
22:00	Scoring by quarter: 22–18, 20–21, 17–16, 21–22
	Pts: Garuba 16; Rebs: Garuba 14; Asts: Llull 5 PIR: Garuba 23	Boxscore	Pts: Kalinić 13; Rebs: Labeyrie 5 Asts: Van Rossom 3 PIR: Kalinić, Tobey 14	Arena: WiZink Center; Attendance: 1,000; Referees: Antonio Conde, Carlos Peruga, Jordi Aliaga

==== Finals ====
13 June 2021 1	Real Madrid	75–89	Barça	Madrid
18:30	Scoring by quarter: 20–15, 16–18, 16–29, 23–27
	Pts: Tavares 16; Rebs: Tavares 11; Asts: Llull 3 PIR: Tavares 26	Boxscore	Pts: Higgins 26; Rebs: Gasol 8 Asts: Calathes 4 PIR: Higgins 26	Arena: WiZink Center; Attendance: 1,000; Referees: Carlos Peruga, Jordi Aliaga, Martín Caballero

15 June 2021 2	Barça	92–73	Real Madrid	Barcelona
22:00	Scoring by quarter: 26–15, 22–15, 29–25, 15–18
	Pts: Mirotić 27; Rebs: Šmits, Gasol 6 Asts: Calathes 7 PIR: Mirotić 35	Boxscore	Pts: Abalde 15; Rebs: Tavares 6 Asts: Alocén 5 PIR: Abalde 21	Arena: Palau Blaugrana; Attendance: 1,000; Referees: Antonio Conde, Emilio Pérez, Luis Miguel Castillo

=== EuroLeague ===
==== League table ====
Pos	Team	Pld	W	L	PF	PA	PD	Qualification
4	(Italy) A|X Armani Exchange Milan	34	21	13	2720	2599	+121	Qualification to playoffs
5	(Germany) Bayern Munich	34	21	13	2633	2599	+34	Qualification to playoffs
6	(Spain) Real Madrid	34	20	14	2667	2593	+74	Qualification to playoffs
7	(Turkey) Fenerbahçe Beko	34	20	14	2661	2679	−18	Qualification to playoffs
8	(Russia) Zenit Saint Petersburg	34	20	14	2670	2547	+123	Qualification to playoffs

Source: EuroLeague
Rules for classification: All points scored in extra period(s) will not be counted in the standings, nor for any tie-break situation.

==== Results summary ====
Overall						Home					Away				
Pld	W	L	PF	PA	PD	W	L	PF	PA	PD	W	L	PF	PA	PD
34	20	14	2667	2593	+74	10	7	1388	1330	+58	10	7	1279	1263	+16

Source: Competitive matches

==== Results by round ====
Round	1	2	3	4	5	6	7	8	9	10	11	12	13	14	15	16	17	18	19	20	21	22	23	24	25	26	27	28	29	30	31	32	33	34
Ground	A	H	H	A	A	H	A	A	H	H	A	H	H	A	A	H	A	H	H	A	A	H	A	H	A	H	A	A	H	H	A	H	H	A
Result	L	L	W	L	L	W	W	W	W	W	L	W	W	W	W	W	W	L	L	W	L	W	W	L	L	W	L	W	L	L	W	L	W	W
Position	17	18	15	15	17	15	12	10	8	7	9	5	5	4	4	3	2	4	4	4	5	4	4	4	6	5	7	6	6	7	7	8	7	6

Source: Competitive matches
A = Away; H = Home; W = Win; L = Loss

==== Matches ====
2 October 2020 1	TD Systems Baskonia (Spain)	76–63	(Spain) Real Madrid	Vitoria-Gasteiz
21:00	Scoring by quarter: 15–16, 18–13, 19–20, 24–14
	Pts: Henry 23; Rebs: Polonara 9 Asts: Henry 6 PIR: Henry 32	Boxscore	Pts: Campazzo 17; Rebs: Tavares 7 Asts: Campazzo 2 PIR: Tavares 17	Arena: Buesa Arena; Attendance: 400; Referees: Sreten Radović, Joseph Bissang, Mario Majkić

8 October 2020 2	Real Madrid (Spain)	77–93	(Spain) Valencia Basket	Madrid
21:00	Scoring by quarter: 19–17, 20–27, 14–24, 24–25
	Pts: Tavares 15; Rebs: Deck, Tavares 7 Asts: Abalde, Llull 4 PIR: Tavares 24	Boxscore	Pts: Dubljević 24; Rebs: Kalinić 8 Asts: Hermannsson, Van Rossom 4 PIR: Dubljević 23	Arena: WiZink Center; Attendance: 0 Referees: Damir Javor, Piotr Pastusiak, Sébastien Clivaz

14 October 2020 3	Real Madrid (Spain)	94–85	(Russia) Khimki	Madrid
21:00	Scoring by quarter: 25–25, 24–16, 21–16, 24–28
	Pts: Llull 21; Rebs: Deck 5 Asts: Campazzo 8 PIR: Llull 26	Boxscore	Pts: Booker 22; Rebs: Jerebko 9 Asts: Zaytsev 9 PIR: Zaytsev 26	Arena: WiZink Center; Attendance: 0 Referees: Saša Pukl, Mehdi Difallah, Jakub Zamojski

16 October 2020 4	A|X Armani Exchange Milan (Italy)	78–70	(Spain) Real Madrid	Milan
20:45	Scoring by quarter: 10–19, 21–23, 23–13, 24–15
	Pts: Rodríguez 25; Rebs: Shields 7 Asts: Rodríguez 7 PIR: Rodríguez 37	Boxscore	Pts: Thompkins 15; Rebs: Garuba 11; Asts: Thompkins, Campazzo 3 PIR: Thompkins 16	Arena: Mediolanum Forum; Attendance: 886; Referees: Damir Javor, Robert Vyklický, Marcin Kowalski

23 October 2020 5	Barcelona (Spain)	79–72	(Spain) Real Madrid	Barcelona
21:00	Scoring by quarter: 18–14, 30–13, 16–25, 15–20
	Pts: Kuric 15; Rebs: Martínez 9 Asts: Calathes 7 PIR: Davies 21	Boxscore	Pts: Thompkins 14; Rebs: Thompkins 7 Asts: Campazzo 6 PIR: Thompkins 23	Arena: Palau Blaugrana; Attendance: 0 Referees: Christos Christodoulou, Mehdi Difallah, Milan Nedović

29 October 2020 6	Real Madrid (Spain)	100–82	(Germany) Bayern Munich	Madrid
21:00	Scoring by quarter: 27–17, 22–28, 21–16, 30–21
	Pts: Carroll 19; Rebs: Thompkins 7 Asts: Campazzo, Laprovíttola 6 PIR: Randolph, Carroll 20	Boxscore	Pts: Baldwin 18; Rebs: Reynolds 7 Asts: Baldwin 4 PIR: Reynolds 17	Arena: WiZink Center; Attendance: 0 Referees: Luigi Lamonica, Gytis Vilius, Uroš Obrknežević

6 November 2020 7	Žalgiris (Lithuania)	90–93	(Spain) Real Madrid	Kaunas
19:00	Scoring by quarter: 24–32, 30–16, 19–19, 17–26
	Pts: Walkup 18; Rebs: Walkup 7 Asts: Walkup 9 PIR: Walkup 29	Boxscore	Pts: Tavares 22; Rebs: Tavares 12; Asts: Campazzo 10; PIR: Tavares 36	Arena: Žalgirio arena Attendance: 239; Referees: Saša Pukl, Joseph Bissang, Anne Panther

13 November 2020 8	Crvena zvezda mts (Serbia)	67–73	(Spain) Real Madrid	Belgrade
19:00	Scoring by quarter: 26–21, 16–15, 11–23, 14–14
	Pts: Loyd 22; Rebs: O'Bryant 8 Asts: three players 3 PIR: Loyd 20	Boxscore	Pts: Thompkins 14; Rebs: three players 6 Asts: Abalde 6 PIR: Randolph 16	Arena: Aleksandar Nikolić Hall; Attendance: 0 Referees: Christos Christodolou, Emin Moğulkoç, Amit Balak

18 November 2020 9	Real Madrid (Spain)	79–63	(Israel) Maccabi Playtika Tel Aviv	Madrid
18:30	Scoring by quarter: 29–18, 16–14, 17–18, 17–13
	Pts: Deck 16; Rebs: Tavares 8 Asts: Campazzo 12; PIR: three players 21	Boxscore	Pts: Wilbekin 18; Rebs: Žižić 10; Asts: Bryant 3 PIR: Žižić 17	Arena: WiZink Center; Attendance: 0 Referees: Oļegs Latiševs, Piotr Pastusiak, Tomislav Hordov

20 November 2020 10	Real Madrid (Spain)	94–74	(Turkey) Fenerbahçe Beko	Madrid
21:00	Scoring by quarter: 28–12, 21–24, 23–15, 22–23
	Pts: Abalde 17; Rebs: Tavares 6 Asts: Campazzo 12; PIR: Abalde 22	Boxscore	Pts: Barthel 22; Rebs: Brown 6 Asts: Brown 5 PIR: Barthel 23	Arena: WiZink Center; Attendance: 0 Referees: Matej Boltauzer, Fernando Rocha, Joseph Bissang

26 November 2020 11	CSKA Moscow (Russia)	74–73	(Spain) Real Madrid	Moscow
18:00	Scoring by quarter: 17–20, 18–18, 23–17, 16–18
	Pts: James 28; Rebs: Milutinov, Clyburn 9 Asts: Clyburn 5 PIR: James 24	Boxscore	Pts: Thompkins 15; Rebs: Tavares 10; Asts: Llull 9 PIR: Tavares 25	Arena: Megasport Arena; Attendance: 3,103; Referees: Luigi Lamonica, Sašo Petek, Gytis Vilius

4 December 2020 12	Real Madrid (Spain)	91–84	(France) LDLC ASVEL	Madrid
21:00	Scoring by quarter: 19–26, 21–24, 21–20, 30–14
	Pts: Llull, Tavares 19; Rebs: Tavares 6 Asts: Laprovíttola 5 PIR: Tavares 29	Boxscore	Pts: Cole, Yabusele 21; Rebs: Yabusele 7 Asts: Cole 4 PIR: Cole 20	Arena: WiZink Center; Attendance: 0 Referees: Ilija Belošević, Mario Majkić, Gentian Cici

10 December 2020 13	Real Madrid (Spain)	79–72	(Russia) Zenit Saint Petersburg	Madrid
21:00	Scoring by quarter: 24–21, 12–10, 23–11, 20–23
	Pts: Abalde 16; Rebs: Tavares 13; Asts: Laprovíttola 4 PIR: Tavares 26	Boxscore	Pts: Hollins 15; Rebs: Ponitka, Poythress 5 Asts: Ponitka 5 PIR: Hollins 15	Arena: WiZink Center; Attendance: 0 Referees: Saša Pukl, Milivoje Jovčić, Robert Vyklický

15 December 2020 14	Panathinaikos OPAP (Greece)	93–97(OT)	(Spain) Real Madrid	Athens
20:00	Scoring by quarter: 15–14, 14–19, 19–23, 20–12, Overtime: 11–11, 14–18
	Pts: Nedović 27; Rebs: Papapetrou 7 Asts: Mack 6 PIR: Nedović 24	Boxscore	Pts: Tavares 20; Rebs: Tavares 14; Asts: Abalde 6 PIR: Tavares 36	Arena: O.A.K.A. Attendance: 0 Referees: Robert Lottermoser, Damir Javor, Uroš Nikolić

18 December 2020 15	Olympiacos (Greece)	82–86(OT)	(Spain) Real Madrid	Piraeus
20:00	Scoring by quarter: 12–12, 18–19, 21–18, 18–20, Overtime: 13–17
	Pts: McKissic, Martin 18; Rebs: Vezenkov, Martin 6 Asts: Sloukas 7 PIR: Martin 17	Boxscore	Pts: Laprovíttola 19; Rebs: Tavares 10; Asts: Laprovíttola 6 PIR: Laprovíttola 27	Arena: Peace and Friendship Stadium; Attendance: 0 Referees: Borys Ryzhyk, Jakub Zamojski, Tomislav Hordov

22 December 2020 16	Real Madrid (Spain)	91–62	(Germany) ALBA Berlin	Madrid
21:00	Scoring by quarter: 19–18, 26–12, 27–14, 19–18
	Pts: Tavares 16; Rebs: Tavares 11; Asts: Abalde 6 PIR: Tavares 27	Boxscore	Pts: Sikma, Lô 13; Rebs: Sikma 7 Asts: Thiemann 4 PIR: Sikma, Lô 12	Arena: WiZink Center; Attendance: 0 Referees: Christos Christodoulou, Mehdi Difallah, Tomasz Trawicki

29 December 2020 17	Anadolu Efes (Turkey)	65–73	(Spain) Real Madrid	Istanbul
18:30	Scoring by quarter: 20–13, 17–18, 14–21, 14–21
	Pts: Micić 16; Rebs: Dunston 7 Asts: Larkin, Micić 5 PIR: Micić 13	Boxscore	Pts: Causeur 15; Rebs: Tavares 9 Asts: Laprovíttola 6 PIR: Laprovíttola 16	Arena: Sinan Erdem Dome; Attendance: 0 Referees: Luigi Lamonica, Matej Boltauzer, Fernando Rocha

8 January 2021 18	Real Madrid (Spain)	76–80	(Italy) A|X Armani Exchange Milan	Madrid
21:00	Scoring by quarter: 18–17, 21–22, 10–22, 27–19
	Pts: Carroll 20; Rebs: Thompkins 7 Asts: Alocén 5 PIR: Tavares 27	Boxscore	Pts: Rodríguez 17; Rebs: Moraschini 10; Asts: Delaney 5 PIR: Delaney, Datome 15	Arena: WiZink Center; Attendance: 0 Referees: Robert Lottermoser, Emin Moğulkoç, Piotr Pastusiak

15 January 2021 20	Bayern Munich (Germany)	76–81(OT)	(Spain) Real Madrid	Munich
20:30	Scoring by quarter: 15–23, 19–16, 16–12, 22–21, Overtime: 4–9
	Pts: Reynolds 18; Rebs: Baldwin 7 Asts: Baldwin 4 PIR: Reynolds 17	Boxscore	Pts: Tavares 26; Rebs: Tavares, Thompkins 9 Asts: Laprovíttola 7 PIR: Tavares 27	Arena: Audi Dome; Attendance: 0 Referees: Damir Javor, Tomasz Trawicki, Saulius Račys

18 January 2021 19	Real Madrid (Spain)	77–79	(Serbia) Crvena zvezda mts	Madrid
21:00	Scoring by quarter: 21–23, 19–22, 18–21, 19–13
	Pts: Fernández 11; Rebs: Tavares 9 Asts: Laprovíttola 10; PIR: Laprovíttola 18	Boxscore	Pts: Walden 18; Rebs: Kuzmić 9 Asts: Dobrić 3 PIR: Dobrić 21	Arena: WiZink Center; Attendance: 0 Referees: Christos Christodoulou, Gytis Vilius, Hugues Thépénier
Note: Originally scheduled for January 2021 due to the inability of Crvena Zvezda to reach Madrid.

21 January 2021 21	Maccabi Playtika Tel Aviv (Israel)	86–84	(Spain) Real Madrid	Tel Aviv
20:05	Scoring by quarter: 24–33, 21–13, 18–20, 23–18
	Pts: Dorsey 30; Rebs: three players 4 Asts: Wilbekin 8 PIR: Dorsey 36	Boxscore	Pts: Thompkins 20; Rebs: Thompkins, Tavares 6 Asts: Abalde 7 PIR: Thompkins 27	Arena: Menora Mivtachim Arena; Attendance: 0 Referees: Sreten Radović, Mehdi Difallah, Anne Panther

27 January 2021 22	Real Madrid (Spain)	76–66	(Greece) Panathinaikos OPAP	Madrid
21:00	Scoring by quarter: 25–12, 24–15, 15–23, 12–16
	Pts: Deck 20; Rebs: Deck 9 Asts: Thompkins 5 PIR: Deck 29	Boxscore	Pts: Nedović 18; Rebs: Mitoglou, Bentil 7 Asts: Foster 3 PIR: Foster, Auguste 11	Arena: WiZink Center; Attendance: 0 Referees: Ilija Belošević, Carmelo Paternicò, Tomislav Hordov

29 January 2021 23	ALBA Berlin (Germany)	63–72	(Spain) Real Madrid	Berlin
20:00	Scoring by quarter: 14–22, 16–18, 17–19, 16–13
	Pts: Sikma 16; Rebs: Sikma 6 Asts: Granger 8 PIR: Sikma 21	Boxscore	Pts: Causeur 13; Rebs: Tavares 10; Asts: Causeur 5 PIR: Tavares 21	Arena: Mercedes-Benz Arena; Attendance: 0 Referees: Saša Pukl, Joseph Bissang, Michele Rossi

5 February 2021 24	Real Madrid (Spain)	64–84	(Spain) TD Systems Baskonia	Madrid
21:00	Scoring by quarter: 15–28, 19–9, 18–23, 12–24
	Pts: Abalde 12; Rebs: Tavares 8 Asts: Alocén 4 PIR: Deck 17	Boxscore	Pts: Polonara 18; Rebs: Sedekerskis 7 Asts: Henry 10; PIR: Vildoza 19	Arena: WiZink Center; Attendance: 0 Referees: Robert Lottermoser, Oļegs Latiševs, Robert Vyklický

19 February 2021 25	Valencia Basket (Spain)	89–78	(Spain) Real Madrid	Valencia
21:00	Scoring by quarter: 29–21, 26–14, 16–17, 18–26
	Pts: Van Rossom 16; Rebs: Labeyrie 8 Asts: Van Rossom 8 PIR: Van Rossom 20	Boxscore	Pts: Carroll 20; Rebs: Tavares, Thompkins 9 Asts: Tavares, Carroll 3 PIR: Tavares 19	Arena: La Fonteta; Attendance: 0 Referees: Luigi Lamonica, Milos Koljenšić, Marko Juras

25 February 2021 26	Real Madrid (Spain)	70–58	(Lithuania) Žalgiris	Madrid
21:00	Scoring by quarter: 21–13, 15–18, 15–11, 19–16
	Pts: Deck 14; Rebs: Tavares 9 Asts: Alocén 6 PIR: Deck 19	Boxscore	Pts: Jankūnas 13; Rebs: Jankūnas 7 Asts: Jokubaitis 4 PIR: Jankūnas 23	Arena: WiZink Center; Attendance: 0 Referees: Damir Javor, Milivoje Jovčić, Kristaps Konstantinovs

2 March 2021 27	Khimki (Russia)	78–77	(Spain) Real Madrid	Khimki
18:00	Scoring by quarter: 17–18, 28–20, 17–24, 16–15
	Pts: McCollum, Shved 22; Rebs: Karasev, Mickey 6 Asts: Shved 8 PIR: Mickey 24	Boxscore	Pts: Deck 15; Rebs: Tavares 11; Asts: Causeur 8 PIR: Deck 22	Arena: Mytishchi Arena; Attendance: 438; Referees: Christos Christodoulou, Milan Nedović, Luka Kardum

4 March 2021 28	Zenit Saint Petersburg (Russia)	71–75	(Spain) Real Madrid	Saint Petersburg
18:00	Scoring by quarter: 13–24, 16–24, 29–14, 13–23
	Pts: Pangos 14; Rebs: Ponitka 7 Asts: Pangos 7 PIR: Ponitka 18	Boxscore	Pts: Tavares 16; Rebs: Tavares 9 Asts: Alocén, Taylor 2 PIR: Tavares 19	Arena: Sibur Arena; Attendance: 3,134; Referees: Ilija Belošević, Piotr Pastusiak, Mykola Ambrosov

11 March 2021 29	Real Madrid (Spain)	76–81	(Spain) Barcelona	Madrid
21:00	Scoring by quarter: 19–24, 19–17, 16–16, 22–24
	Pts: Deck 16; Rebs: Tavares 11; Asts: Abalde 4 PIR: Tavares 29	Boxscore	Pts: Oriola 18; Rebs: Oriola 6 Asts: Mirotić, Higgins 5 PIR: Mirotić 24	Arena: WiZink Center; Attendance: 0 Referees: Borys Ryzhyk, Carmelo Paternicò, Sašo Petek

19 March 2021 30	Real Madrid (Spain)	89–96	(Russia) CSKA Moscow	Madrid
21:00	Scoring by quarter: 21–23, 20–32, 26–19, 22–22
	Pts: Thompkins 20; Rebs: Tavares 13; Asts: Tavares 6 PIR: Tavares 31	Boxscore	Pts: Clyburn 23; Rebs: Voigtmann 9 Asts: James 4 PIR: Clyburn 30	Arena: WiZink Center; Attendance: 0 Referees: Robert Lottermoser, Matej Boltauzer, Mehdi Difallah

25 March 2021 31	LDLC ASVEL (France)	71–74	(Spain) Real Madrid	Villeurbanne
20:45	Scoring by quarter: 23–20, 14–12, 14–24, 20–18
	Pts: Cole 18; Rebs: Fall 11; Asts: Diot 5 PIR: Fall 19	Boxscore	Pts: Thompkins 13; Rebs: Garuba 8 Asts: Garuba 3 PIR: Abalde 14	Arena: Astroballe; Attendance: 0 Referees: Saša Pukl, Rain Peerandi, Sébastien Clivaz

30 March 2021 32	Real Madrid (Spain)	83–108	(Turkey) Anadolu Efes	Madrid
21:00	Scoring by quarter: 20–20, 22–21, 22–35, 19–32
	Pts: Thompkins 19; Rebs: Garuba 6 Asts: Laprovíttola, Garuba 4 PIR: Thompkins, Garuba 20	Boxscore	Pts: Şanlı 17; Rebs: Singleton 6 Asts: Micić 5 PIR: Simon 21	Arena: WiZink Center; Attendance: 0 Referees: Christos Christodoulou, Tomislav Hordov, Tomasz Trawicki

2 April 2021 33	Real Madrid (Spain)	72–63	(Greece) Olympiacos	Madrid
21:00	Scoring by quarter: 20–11, 16–15, 17–12, 19–25
	Pts: Deck 18; Rebs: Tavares 8 Asts: Abalde 4 PIR: Deck 28	Boxscore	Pts: Vezenkov 22; Rebs: Jean-Charles, Koufos 7 Asts: Sloukas 5 PIR: Vezenkov 24	Arena: WiZink Center; Attendance: 0 Referees: Borys Ryzhyk, Milan Nedović, Uroš Nikolić

8 April 2021 34	Fenerbahçe Beko (Turkey)	63–97	(Spain) Real Madrid	Istanbul
19:45	Scoring by quarter: 11–23, 25–26, 21–18, 10–26
	Pts: de Colo 23; Rebs: O'Quinn, de Colo 5 Asts: O'Quinn, Pierre 2 PIR: de Colo 27	Boxscore	Pts: Causeur 20; Rebs: Thompkins 9 Asts: Laprovíttola 10; PIR: Laprovíttola 29	Arena: Ülker Sports and Event Hall; Attendance: 0 Referees: Luigi Lamonica, Anne Panther, Mario Majkić

=== EuroLeague Playoffs ===
==== Quarterfinals ====
Win Loss

20 April 2021 1	Anadolu Efes (Turkey)	90–63	(Spain) Real Madrid	Istanbul
19:00	Scoring by quarter: 20–18, 24–22, 20–10, 26–13
	Pts: Beaubois 19; Rebs: Şanlı 8 Asts: Simon 6 PIR: Şanlı 19	Boxscore	Pts: Thompkins 13; Rebs: Tavares 9 Asts: Laprovíttola 4 PIR: Laprovíttola, Thompkins 13	Arena: Sinan Erdem Dome; Attendance: 0 Referees: Sreten Radović, Saša Pukl, Tomasz Trawicki

22 April 2021 2	Anadolu Efes (Turkey)	91–68	(Spain) Real Madrid	Istanbul
19:00	Scoring by quarter: 22–13, 22–19, 21–13, 26–23
	Pts: Micić 23; Rebs: three players 4 Asts: Beaubois 6 PIR: Micić 26	Boxscore	Pts: Thompkins 17; Rebs: Garuba 6 Asts: Laprovíttola 10; PIR: Laprovíttola, Garuba 16	Arena: Sinan Erdem Dome; Attendance: 0 Referees: Matej Boltauzer, Mehdi Difallah, Saulius Račys

27 April 2021 3	Real Madrid (Spain)	80–76	(Turkey) Anadolu Efes	Madrid
20:00	Scoring by quarter: 15–15, 13–23, 20–20, 32–18
	Pts: Llull 20; Rebs: Garuba 9 Asts: Llull 7 PIR: Llull 22	Boxscore	Pts: Micić 29; Rebs: Dunston 7 Asts: Micić 6 PIR: Micić 34	Arena: WiZink Center; Attendance: 0 Referees: Luigi Lamonica, Fernando Rocha, Anne Panther

29 April 2021 4	Real Madrid (Spain)	82–76	(Turkey) Anadolu Efes	Madrid
22:00	Scoring by quarter: 19–13, 17–34, 21–19, 25–10
	Pts: Garuba 24; Rebs: Garuba 12; Asts: Llull 8 PIR: Garuba 30	Boxscore	Pts: Beaubois 23; Rebs: Singleton, Dunston 9 Asts: Larkin 8 PIR: Larkin 31	Arena: WiZink Center; Attendance: 0 Referees: Sreten Radović, Oļegs Latiševs, Milan Nedović

4 May 2021 5	Anadolu Efes (Turkey)	88–83	(Spain) Real Madrid	Istanbul
18:45	Scoring by quarter: 18–21, 18–20, 24–16, 28–26
	Pts: Singleton 26; Rebs: Singleton 8 Asts: Micić 5 PIR: Singleton 38	Boxscore	Pts: Laprovíttola 17; Rebs: Garuba, Tavares 7 Asts: Laprovíttola, Abalde 4 PIR: Laprovíttola 20	Arena: Sinan Erdem Dome; Attendance: 0 Referees: Matej Boltauzer, Fernando Rocha, Uroš Nikolić

=== Copa del Rey ===
Win Loss

11 February 2021 Quarterfinal	Real Madrid	85–74	Valencia Basket	Madrid
21:30	Scoring by quarter: 29–17, 20–17, 14–21, 22–16
	Pts: Thompkins, Deck 23; Rebs: Deck 6 Asts: Alocén 7 PIR: Thompkins, Deck 22	Boxscore	Pts: Van Rossom 16; Rebs: Labeyrie 7 Asts: Van Rossom, Kalinić 2 PIR: Van Rossom, Kalinić 18	Arena: WiZink Center; Attendance: 0 Referees: Daniel Hierrezuelo, Jordi Aliaga, Luis Miguel Castillo, Juan de Dios Oyón

13 February 2021 Semifinal	Real Madrid	85–79	Lenovo Tenerife	Madrid
16:00	Scoring by quarter: 19–23, 21–23, 25–16, 20–17
	Pts: Deck, Causeur 18; Rebs: Tavares 15; Asts: Llull 5 PIR: Tavares 24	Boxscore	Pts: Huertas 22; Rebs: Sulejmanović 6 Asts: Huertas, Fitipaldo 5 PIR: Huertas 16	Arena: WiZink Center; Attendance: 0 Referees: Carlos Peruga, Óscar Perea, Arnau Padrós, Jordi Aliaga

14 February 2021 Final	Real Madrid	73–88	Barça	Madrid
18:30	Scoring by quarter: 11–20, 20–32, 19–17, 23–19
	Pts: Tavares 17; Rebs: Tavares 9 Asts: Alocén 3 PIR: Tavares 28	Boxscore	Pts: Higgins 20; Rebs: Davies 8 Asts: Calathes 9 PIR: Calathes 18	Arena: WiZink Center; Attendance: 0 Referees: Daniel Hierrezuelo, Carlos Peruga, Antonio Conde

=== Supercopa de España ===
12 September 2020 Semifinal	Iberostar Tenerife	79–92	Real Madrid	San Cristóbal de La Laguna
21:30	Scoring by quarter: 18–23, 24–25, 17–22, 20–22
	Pts: Huertas 17; Rebs: Sulejmanović 8 Asts: Huertas 5 PIR: Huertas 16	Boxscore	Pts: Fernández 18; Rebs: Randolph 8 Asts: Campazzo 7 PIR: Fernández 18	Arena: Santiago Martín; Attendance: 0 Referees: José Ramón García, Fernando Calatrava, Jordi Aliaga

13 September 2020 Final	Real Madrid	72–67	Barça	San Cristóbal de La Laguna
18:30	Scoring by quarter: 18–14, 13–18, 19–17, 22–18
	Pts: Campazzo 21; Rebs: Tavares 7 Asts: Campazzo 2 PIR: Campazzo 18	Boxscore	Pts: Mirotić 22; Rebs: Davies 8 Asts: three players 3 PIR: Mirotić 26	Arena: Santiago Martín; Attendance: 0 Referees: Sergio Manuel, Óscar Perea, Carlos Peruga

== Statistics ==
=== Liga ACB ===
Player	GP	GS	MPG	2FG%	3FG%	FT%	RPG	APG	SPG	BPG	PPG	PIR
Alberto Abalde												
Carlos Alocén												
Facundo Campazzo												
Jaycee Carroll												
Fabien Causeur												
Gabriel Deck												
Rudy Fernández												
Usman Garuba												
Nicolás Laprovíttola												
Sergio Llull												
Juan Núñez												
Vincent Poirier												
Anthony Randolph												
Felipe Reyes												
Edy Tavares												
Jeffery Taylor												
Trey Thompkins												
Boris Tisma												
Alex Tyus												
Tristan Vukčević												
TOTAL												

=== EuroLeague ===
Player	GP	GS	MPG	2FG%	3FG%	FT%	RPG	APG	SPG	BPG	PPG	PIR
Alberto Abalde	39	23	19:29	47%	43.5%	84.1%	2.7	2.3	0.5	-	7.2	8.3
Carlos Alocén	28	16	13:24	51.5%	28.2%	58.3%	1.4	2.3	0.2	0.1	3.9	3.3
Facundo Campazzo	10	8	25:45	57.1%	27.5%	82.6%	2.5	6.7	2	-	9.3	13.6
Jaycee Carroll	31	8	14:52	63.3%	40.3%	94.4%	1.1	0.5	0.2	-	9.4	7.1
Fabien Causeur	28	8	14:06	51.4	41.7%	65.9%	1.1	1.4	0.4	-	6.3	5.4
Gabriel Deck	32	22	24:05	52.4%	40.7%	84.3%	3.7	1.2	0.7	-	8.8	10.3
Rudy Fernández	28	0	15:26	31.6%	34.6%	84.6%	1.1	1.2	0.5	0.1	5.5	4.5
Usman Garuba	39	20	16:17	62.8%	26.8%	59.5%	4	0.7	0.6	0.7	3.9	6.1
Nicolás Laprovíttola	34	13	17:37	43.9%	34.7%	86.6%	1.6	3.8	0.7	-	6.8	8.1
Sergio Llull	26	3	17:44	41.5%	33%	86.3%	1.5	3	0.4	-	8.7	7.8
Anthony Randolph	13	11	18:53	52.5%	37.3%	88.9%	3.6	0.8	0.6	0.3	9.3	9.7
Felipe Reyes	5	0	4:15	28.6%	-	75%	1.2	0.2	0.2	0.2	1.4	0.8
Edy Tavares	36	31	26:01	65.1%	-	71.6%	8	1.1	1	1.8	11.4	18.1
Jeffery Taylor	32	14	14:45	58.8%	26.5%	75%	1.5	0.5	0.4	0.1	3.6	2
Trey Thompkins	38	10	21:07	61.2%	42.4%	94.7%	4.1	1.2	0.6	0.3	10.1	11
Alex Tyus	20	7	11:56	50%	-	75%	2.5	0.5	0.4	0.4	3	3.4
Tristan Vukčević	3	1	9:09	75%	-	100%	1.7	-	-	0.3	2.3	-1
TOTAL				55.5%	36.5%	79.8%	33.9	18.1	6.3	3.2	79.4	89.5

Source: EuroLeague

=== Copa Del Rey ===
Player	GP	GS	MPG	2FG%	3FG%	FT%	RPG	APG	SPG	BPG	PPG	PIR
Alberto Abalde	3	1	12:43	33.3%	40%	100%	1	0.7	0.7	0	6.3	4.7
Carlos Alocén	3	2	13:16	83.3%	33.3%	66.7%	1	3.7	0.3	0	5	8
Jaycee Carroll	3	1	16:13	37.5%	21.4%	100%	0.3	0	0.7	0.7	7	2.7
Fabien Causeur	3	2	23:55	60%	35.7%	-	3	0.7	1.3	0	6	9
Gabriel Deck	3	3	27:04	72%	43%	62%	5.3	0.3	0.3	0	16.7	18.7
Rudy Fernández	2	0	17:38	0%	25%	100%	2	1	0.5	1.5	4	4.5
Usman Garuba	2	0	8:30	-	0%	-	1.5	0.5	1	0	0	1
Nicolás Laprovíttola	3	0	9:49	50%	0%	-	1.3	2	1	0	0.7	2
Sergio Llull	3	1	19:48	42.9%	26.7%	50%	2	2.3	0	0.3	8.3	4
Felipe Reyes	2	0	4:57	66.7%	-	100%	2	0.5	0	0	3	3.5
Edy Tavares	3	2	25:39	72.2%	-	40%	9.3	1.3	0.3	3.3	10	20.7
Trey Thompkins	3	3	25:17	53.3%	33.3%	100%	3.3	1	0.3	1	12.3	12.7
Alex Tyus	3	0	5:29	0%	-	75%	1.3	0	0.3	0	1	1
TOTAL				57.7%	30.1%	76.9%	36	13.3	5.3	6.3	81	88.3

Source: ACB

=== Supercopa de España ===
Player	GP	GS	MPG	2FG%	3FG%	FT%	RPG	APG	SPG	BPG	PPG	PIR
Alberto Abalde	2	2	19:45	80%	60%	60%	1.5	1	2	0	10	12.5
Carlos Alocén	1	0	13:38	66.7%	50%	66.7%	1	2	2	0	9	10
Facundo Campazzo	2	2	30:05	41.7%	33.3%	66.7%	4.5	4.5	0.5	0.5	15	16
Jaycee Carroll	2	1	10:05	100%	0%	-	0.5	0	0	0	2	1
Gabriel Deck	2	2	32:00	75%	0%	71.4%	1.5	0	1.5	0	11.5	9
Rudy Fernández	2	0	17:55	50%	41.7%	100%	3	1	0	0	11	11.5
Usman Garuba	2	1	14:52	50%	0%		4	0.5	0.5	0	1.5	1.5
Nicolás Laprovíttola	1	0	6:13	50%	0%	-	2	1	0	0	2	2
Sergio Llull	2	0	19:47	42.9%	16.7%	100%	0.5	2	0	0	6	3.5
Anthony Randolph	2	0	17:48	57.%	20%	66.7%	5.5	0	0.5	0	7.5	7
Edy Tavares	2	2	21:54	22.2%	0%	100%	6.5	0.5	1	1.5	6	11.5
Jeffery Taylor	1	0	4:45	0%	0%	-	1	0	0	0	0	-4
Trey Thompkins	2	0	13:38	50%	50%	-	2.5	0	1	0	6	3.5
TOTAL				52.8%	31.5%	76.5%	35	11	7.5	2	82	82

Source: ACB
