= 2021 Copa del Rey de Baloncesto =

Spanish basketball competition

2021 Copa del Rey
Tournament details
- Country: Spain
- City: Madrid
- Venue: WiZink Center
- Dates: 11–14 February 2021
- Teams: 8
- Defending champions: Real Madrid

Final positions
- Champions: Barça (26th title)
- Runners-up: Real Madrid
- Semifinalists: Lenovo Tenerife; TD Systems Baskonia

Tournament statistics
- Matches played: 7

Awards
- MVP: Cory Higgins (Barça)

The 2021 Copa del Rey de Baloncesto was the 85th edition of the Spanish Basketball King's Cup. It was managed by the ACB and was held in Madrid, in the WiZink Center in February 2021. All matches were played behind closed doors due to the COVID-19 pandemic.

Real Madrid was the defending champion which was defeated in the final by eternal rival Barça which conquered its 26th cup.

All times were in Central European Time (UTC+01:00).

== Qualified teams ==
The top eight ranking teams participated after the first half of the 2020–21 ACB regular season once Real Madrid has already mathematically guaranteed its host team status and its presence in the top eight.

Given the uncertainty generated by the COVID-19 pandemic, the ACB agreed that to use the win percentage over the total number of games played by each team as the first criterion to decide the qualification for the Copa del Rey, thus avoiding harming any club if it cannot play all their matches before the January 10 deadline.

The tiebreaker criteria in the qualification for the Copa del Rey is the following:

1. Best win percentage over the total number of games played by each team.
2. If the tie is not resolved, the greater total difference between points for and against taking into account all the games played in the regular season.
3. If the tie is not resolved, the sum of the quotients of points in favor and against in each of the disputed matches were applied to the teams that remain tied, with the highest having it being the qualified team.

Pos	Team	Pld	W	L	PF	PA	PD	PCT	Qualification
1	Real Madrid (H)	17	16	1	1482	1276	+206	.941	Qualification as seeded team
2	Barça	18	15	3	1531	1337	+194	.833	Qualification as seeded team
3	Lenovo Tenerife	18	14	4	1570	1435	+135	.778	Qualification as seeded team
4	TD Systems Baskonia	18	14	4	1492	1382	+110	.778	Qualification as seeded team
5	Hereda San Pablo Burgos	18	13	5	1577	1447	+130	.722	Qualification as unseeded team
6	Valencia Basket	18	12	6	1558	1456	+102	.667	Qualification as unseeded team
7	Joventut	18	10	8	1521	1496	+25	.556	Qualification as unseeded team
8	Unicaja	18	9	9	1548	1495	+53	.500	Qualification as unseeded team

Updated to match(es) played on 10 January 2021. Source: ACB
Rules for classification: 1) Win percentage; 2) Point difference; 3) Sum of quotients of points scored
(H) Hosts

== Venue ==
On December 15, 2020, ACB selected and announced Madrid to host the Copa del Rey in February 2021. The former building, which was built in 1960, was destroyed by a fire in 2001. Architects Enrique Hermoso and Paloma Huidobro projected a High-Tech style new arena that was built at the same location between 2002 and 2005. The arena hosted two major international basketball events in the first decade of the 21st century - the knockout stage of EuroBasket 2007 and the 2008 Euroleague Final Four. It also hosted the Copa del Rey in 2006, 2009, 2011 and 2019. The arena was the finals venue for the 2014 FIBA Basketball World Cup and the 2015 Euroleague Final Four.

Madrid	2021 Copa del Rey de Baloncesto (Spain)
WiZink Center	2021 Copa del Rey de Baloncesto (Spain)

== Draw ==
The draw was held on 18 January 2021 in Madrid, Spain. The top four ranking teams act as seeded teams in the draw of the quarterfinals. For its part, the top ranking team will play its quarterfinal match on Thursday.

== Bracket ==
Quarterfinals
11 February 2021
Real Madrid	85
Valencia Basket	74
11 February 2021
Lenovo Tenerife	87
Hereda San Pablo Burgos	76
12 February 2021
Barça	103
Unicaja	93
12 February 2021
TD Systems Baskonia	96
Joventut	87

Semifinals
13 February 2021
Real Madrid	85
Lenovo Tenerife	79
13 February 2021
Barça	77
TD Systems Baskonia	68

Final
14 February 2021
Real Madrid	73
Barça	88

== Quarterfinals ==
=== Lenovo Tenerife vs. Hereda San Pablo Burgos ===
11 February 2021	Lenovo Tenerife	87–76	Hereda San Pablo Burgos	Madrid
18:30	Scoring by quarter: 25–17, 26–25, 20–17, 16–17
	Pts: Fitipaldo, Salin 18; Rebs: Sulejmanović 8 Asts: Fitipaldo 6 PIR: Fitipaldo 19	Boxscore	Pts: Rivero 12; Rebs: Rabaseda 7 Asts: Cook 7 PIR: Rivero 16	Arena: WiZink Center; Referees: Juan Carlos García, Óscar Perea, Arnau Padrós

=== Real Madrid vs. Valencia Basket ===
11 February 2021	Real Madrid	85–74	Valencia Basket	Madrid
21:30	Scoring by quarter: 29–17, 20–17, 14–21, 22–19
	Pts: Deck, Thompkins 23; Rebs: Deck 6 Asts: Alocén 7 PIR: Deck, Thompkins 22	Boxscore	Pts: Van Rossom 16; Rebs: Labeyrie 7 Asts: Kalinić, Van Rossom 3 PIR: Kalinić, Van Rossom 18	Arena: WiZink Center; Referees: Daniel Hierrezuelo, Jordi Aliaga, Luis Miguel Castillo

=== TD Systems Baskonia vs. Joventut ===
12 February 2021	TD Systems Baskonia	96–87	Joventut	Madrid
18:30	Scoring by quarter: 28–17, 27–30, 23–21, 18–19
	Pts: Giedraitis, Polonara 19; Rebs: Polonara 6 Asts: Henry 8 PIR: Polonara 29	Boxscore	Pts: Brodziansky 17; Rebs: Tomić 11; Asts: Bassas 6 PIR: Tomić 19	Arena: WiZink Center; Referees: Carlos Peruga, Antonio Conde, Jorge Martínez

=== Barça vs. Unicaja ===
12 February 2021	Barça	103–93(OT)	Unicaja	Madrid
21:30	Scoring by quarter: 15–29, 24–15, 21–21, 28–23, Overtime: 15–5
	Pts: Higgins 22; Rebs: Calathes 5 Asts: Calathes 5 PIR: Higgins 23	Boxscore	Pts: Brizuela 33; Rebs: Suárez, Thompson 7 Asts: Waczyński 5 PIR: Brizuela 22	Arena: WiZink Center; Referees: Emilio Pérez, Carlos Cortés, Sergio Manuel

== Semifinals ==
=== Real Madrid vs. Lenovo Tenerife ===
13 February 2021	Real Madrid	85–79	Lenovo Tenerife	Madrid
16:00	Scoring by quarter: 19–23, 21–23, 25–16, 20–17
	Pts: Causeur, Deck 18; Rebs: Tavares 15; Asts: Llull 5 PIR: Tavares 24	Boxscore	Pts: Huertas 22; Rebs: Sulejmanović 6 Asts: Fitipaldo, Huertas 5 PIR: Huertas 16	Arena: WiZink Center; Referees: Carlos Peruga, Óscar Perea, Arnau Padrós

=== Barça vs. TD Systems Baskonia ===
13 February 2021	Barça	77–68	TD Systems Baskonia	Madrid
19:00	Scoring by quarter: 15–12, 23–15, 26–20, 13–21
	Pts: Mirotić 16; Rebs: Kuric 7 Asts: Calathes 8 PIR: Mirotić 17	Boxscore	Pts: Henry 19; Rebs: Polonara 8 Asts: Vildoza 4 PIR: Jekiri 23	Arena: WiZink Center; Referees: Daniel Hierrezuelo, Antonio Conde, Rafael Serrano

== Final ==
14 February 2021	Real Madrid	73–88	Barça	Madrid
18:30	Scoring by quarter: 11–20, 20–32, 19–17, 23–19
	Pts: Tavares 17; Rebs: Tavares 9 Asts: Alocén 3 PIR: Tavares 28	Boxscore	Pts: Higgins 20; Rebs: Davies 8 Asts: Calathes 9 PIR: Calathes 18	Arena: WiZink Center; Referees: Daniel Hierrezuelo, Carlos Peruga, Antonio Conde

2021 Copa del Rey champions
Barça
26th title
