= Darío Brizuela =

Spanish basketball player (born 1994)

- Brizuela with FC Barcelona in 2026

No. 8 – FC Barcelona
- Position: Shooting guard
- League: Liga ACB; EuroLeague

Personal information
- Born: 8 November 1994 (age 32) San Sebastián, Spain
- Listed height: 1.88 m (6 ft 2 in)
- Listed weight: 73 kg (161 lb)

Career information
- Playing career: 2012–present

Career history
- 2012–2019: Estudiantes
- 2014–2015: →Peñas Huesca
- 2019–2023: Unicaja
- 2023–present: FC Barcelona

Career highlights
- All-Champions League First Team (2023); Copa del Rey (2023)
Medals
Men's basketball
Representing Spain
EuroBasket
Gold medal – first place	2022 Czech Republic–Georgia–Italy–Germany
U20 European Championship
Silver medal – second place	2014 Greece	U20 Team

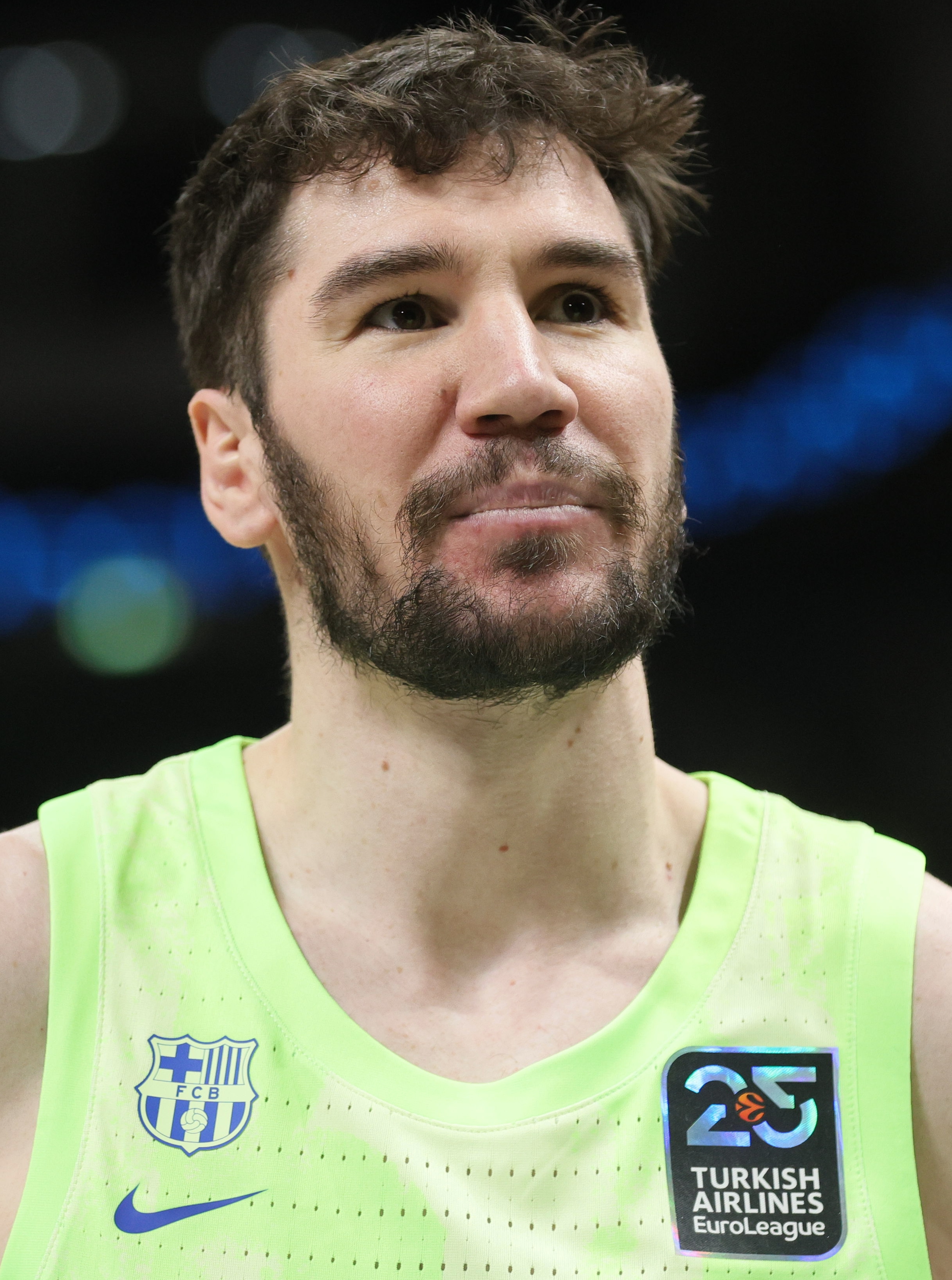

Darío Brizuela Arrieta (born 8 November 1994) is a Spanish professional basketball player for FC Barcelona of the Spanish Liga ACB and the EuroLeague. He also represents the Spain national team.

== Early life and youth career ==
Brizuela's career started in the youth ranks of his hometown team, Easo Basket. In 2011, he was signed by Estudiantes, where he played in the junior team and also played 13 games with the reserve team in Liga EBA.

== Professional career ==
=== Estudiantes (2012–19) ===
Brizuela made his debut in Liga ACB in round 32 of the 2012–13 season, where his club lost by a score of 93–82 against Real Madrid.

In August 2014, he was loaned to Peñas Huesca, of the LEB Oro. After the 2014–15 season, his loan finished and he returned to Estudiantes. In August 2019, Brizuela signed a contract extension for one more season with Estudiantes.

=== Unicaja (2019–23) ===
On December 4, 2019, he signed for Unicaja Málaga of the Liga ACB and EuroCup. He signed a four-season contract with the Andalusian team. In the 2021 Copa del Rey, Brizuela recorded the highest-scoring game for a Spanish player in the competition since 1991, with 33 points.

The 2022–23 season was his most successful with Unicaja, winning the 2023 Copa del Rey and making the All-Champions League First Team. In April 2023, he signed a contract extension with Unicaja until 2026.

=== FC Barcelona (2023–present) ===
On 13 July 2023, he signed with FC Barcelona of the Liga ACB and EuroLeague. Brizuela signed a three-year deal and Barcelona reportedly paid a contract buyout of 1.2 million Euros to complete the move. In March 2025, he scored a personal-high 27 points to help secure an away EuroLeague win against Olimpia Milano, improving Barcelona's chances to reach the 2025 EuroLeague Playoffs.

After playing an increasingly important role in the team during his second season with the Catalans, Brizuela signed a contract extension on July 17, 2025. The contract extension linked him to Barcelona until 2028. In August 2025, he was selected as the best Spanish player of the 2024–25 season by the Spanish Basketball Federation. On January 21, 2026, he recorded one of his best performances with Barcelona, scoring 25 points and the game-deciding shot for a EuroLeague home win against Dubai Basketball.

== Spain national team ==
Brizuela won the silver medal at the 2014 FIBA U20 European Championship. He has also played at the 2010 FIBA U16 European Championship and the 2013 FIBA Under-19 World Cup.

His official match debut with the Spain national team was on 1 July 2018 against Belarus in a 2019 FIBA World Cup qualifier.

== Career statistics ==
Legend
GP	Games played	GS	Games started	MPG	Minutes per game
FG%	Field-goal percentage	3P%	3-point field-goal percentage	FT%	Free-throw percentage
RPG	Rebounds per game	APG	Assists per game	SPG	Steals per game
BPG	Blocks per game	PPG	Points per game	PIR	Performance index rating
**Bold**	Career high

=== EuroLeague ===
Year	Team	GP	GS	MPG	FG%	3P%	FT%	RPG	APG	SPG	BPG	PPG	PIR
2023–24	Barcelona	32	**7**	13.8	.421	.320	.727	1.0	1.6	.3	**.1**	5.7	3.7
2024–25	Barcelona	**36**	0	**18.2**	**.533**	**.460**	**.796**	**1.4**	**2.2**	**.4**	**.1**	**10.0**	**8.4**
Career		68	7	16.1	.516	.411	.783	1.2	1.9	.3	.1	8.0	6.2

=== EuroCup ===
Year	Team	GP	GS	MPG	FG%	3P%	FT%	RPG	APG	SPG	BPG	PPG	PIR
2019–20	Málaga	7	**2**	**22.6**	.386	.297	**.875**	1.0	2.3	**.9**	—	12.3	9.4
2020–21	Málaga	**14**	**2**	**22.6**	**.493**	**.344**	.826	**2.0**	**3.2**	.7	**.1**	**12.9**	**11.9**
Career		21	4	22.6	.458	.327	.851	1.7	2.9	.8	.1	12.7	11.0

=== Basketball Champions League ===
Year	Team	GP	GS	MPG	FG%	3P%	FT%	RPG	APG	SPG	BPG	PPG
2017–18	Estudiantes	14	2	18.2	.405	.289	.700	1.9	1.5	**1.3**	—	6.8
2021–22	Málaga	13	8	20.1	.483	.429	.850	**2.1**	**2.6**	.6	—	11.5
2022–23	Málaga	**15**	**4**	**22.6**	**.504**	**.431**	**.906**	1.4	2.2	.7	—	**12.4**
Career		42	14	18.8	.471	.388	.833	1.8	2.1	.9	—	10.3

=== Domestic leagues ===
Year	Team	League	GP	MPG	FG%	3P%	FT%	RPG	APG	SPG	BPG	PPG
2012–13	(Spain) Estudiantes	ACB	2	1.0	.000	.000	—	—	—	—	—	0.0
2013–14	(Spain) Estudiantes	ACB	5	5.7	.250	.250	.500	1.4	—	—	—	1.4
2014–15	(Spain) Peñas Huesca	LEB Oro	22	20.1	.454	.317	.844	2.0	2.5	.7	.0	12.1
2014–15	(Spain) Estudiantes	ACB	3	17.4	.600	.500	—	1.3	1.0	.7	—	5.0
2015–16	(Spain) Estudiantes	ACB	33	16.5	.437	.348	.824	1.3	1.0	.9	.1	6.4
2016–17	(Spain) Estudiantes	ACB	26	9.4	.310	.176	.750	.9	.9	.4	.1	2.1
2017–18	(Spain) Estudiantes	ACB	32	18.7	.452	.320	.824	1.9	1.5	.6	.1	7.7
2018–19	(Spain) Estudiantes	ACB	30	23.8	.477	.313	.833	1.8	3.0	.9	.1	14.7
2019–20	(Spain) Estudiantes	ACB	10	29.0	.429	.381	.872	2.6	2.5	.9	—	14.1
2019–20	(Spain) Málaga	ACB	17	21.0	.445	.402	.824	1.8	1.3	.4	—	11.7
2020–21	(Spain) Málaga	ACB	34	23.7	.460	.356	.785	1.6	3.1	.9	.1	13.9
2021–22	(Spain) Málaga	ACB	30	22.2	.457	.348	.852	2.2	2.3	1.1	.1	13.8
2022–23	(Spain) Málaga	ACB	34	15.8	.468	.303	.807	1.4	2.2	.5	—	9.2
2023–24	(Spain) Barcelona	ACB	35	15.5	.491	.427	.818	1.3	1.7	.4	.0	7.7
2024–25	(Spain) Barcelona	ACB	35	18.8	.458	.344	.855	1.6	2.8	.6	.0	9.6

== Awards and accomplishments ==
=== Spain national team ===
- 2014 FIBA U20 European Championship: Silver
