= Cory Higgins =

American basketball player (born 1989)

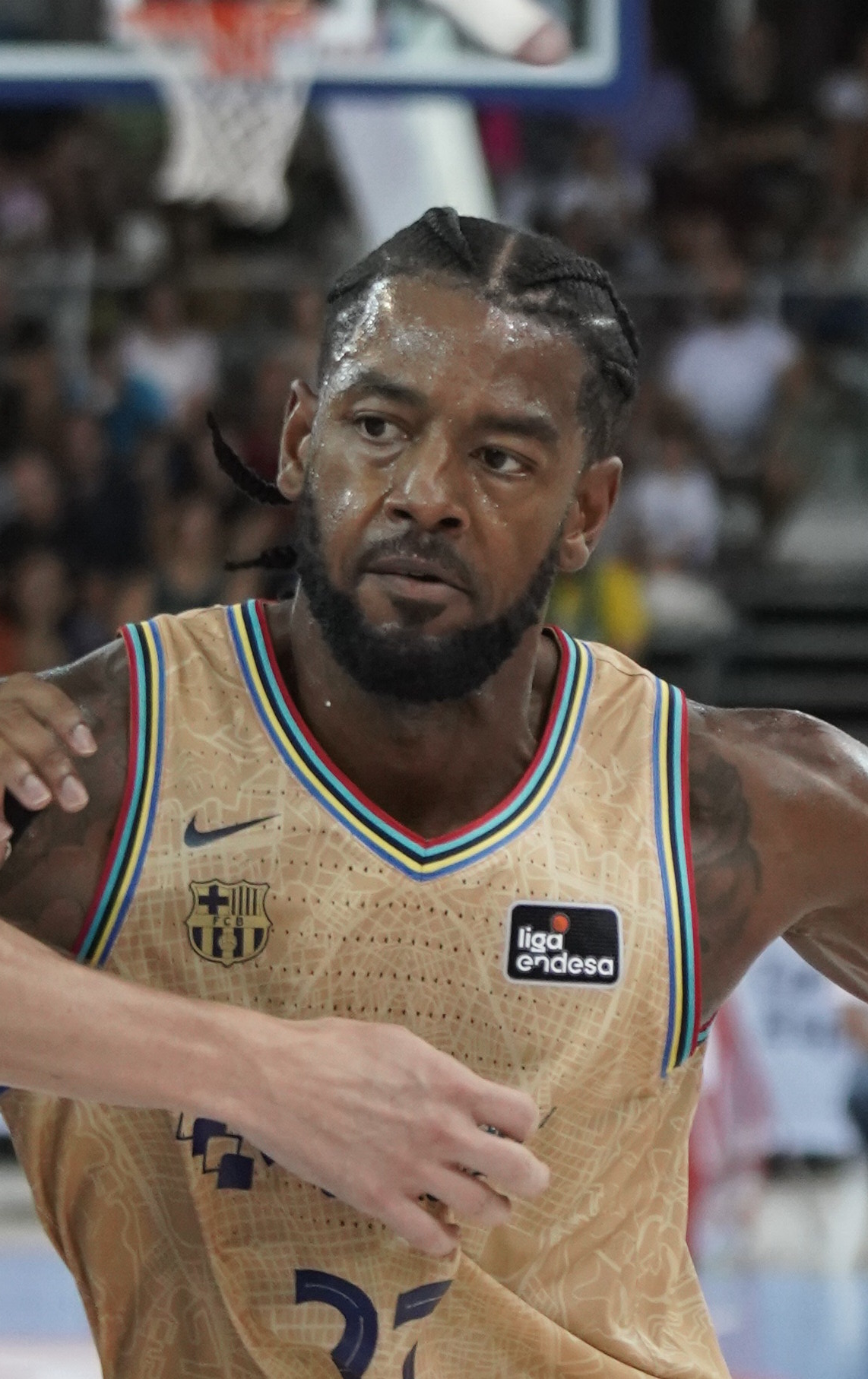
- Higgins with FC Barcelona in 2022

Personal information
- Born: June 14, 1989 (age 37) Danville, California, U.S.
- Listed height: 6 ft 5 in (1.96 m)
- Listed weight: 180 lb (82 kg)

Career information
- High school: Monte Vista (Danville, California)
- College: Colorado (2007–2011)
- NBA draft: 2011: undrafted
- Playing career: 2011–2023
- Position: Shooting guard / Small forward

Career history
- 2011: Erie BayHawks
- 2011–2012: Charlotte Bobcats
- 2013: Erie BayHawks
- 2013–2014: Triumph Lyubertsy
- 2014–2015: Royal Halı Gaziantep
- 2015–2019: CSKA Moscow
- 2019–2023: FC Barcelona

Career highlights
- 2× EuroLeague champion (2016, 2019); 2× Liga ACB champion (2021, 2023); 2× Catalan League champion (2019, 2022); Spanish Cup winner (2021); All-Liga ACB Second Team (2021); Spanish Cup MVP (2021); 4× VTB United League champion (2016–2019); VTB United League Top Scorer (2014); Third-team All-Big 12 (2009)
- Stats at NBA.com
- Stats at Basketball Reference

Courdon Dennard "Cory" Higgins (born June 14, 1989) is an American former professional basketball player who spent the majority of his career playing for CSKA Moscow and FC Barcelona of the EuroLeague.

== High school ==
Higgins played high school basketball at Monte Vista High School, in his hometown Danville, California.

== College career ==
Higgins played college basketball at the University of Colorado, with the Colorado Buffaloes, from 2007 to 2011. He is tied with Richard Roby, with 2,001 career points, as the all-time leading scorer for the Buffaloes, and he is sixth all-time in scoring Big 12 Conference history.

== Professional career ==
After going undrafted in 2011 NBA draft, Higgins was selected with the seventh pick, in 2011 D-League Draft, by the Erie BayHawks. He appeared in five games with the team, averaging 12.6 points.

Higgins was invited to the Denver Nuggets training camp, during the 2011 preseason, but on December 23, 2011, he was waived.

On December 25, 2011, he was claimed off the waivers by the Charlotte Bobcats. He was waived by the Bobcats on December 9, 2012. On January 16, 2013, Higgins was reacquired by the Erie BayHawks.

In October 2013, he signed a one-year deal with Triumph Lyubertsy of Russia.

In June 2014, he signed a one-year deal with Royal Halı Gaziantep of Turkey.

On July 1, 2015, Higgins signed a one-year contract, with an option for a second year, with the Russian club CSKA Moscow. Following a successful season, CSKA used its team option to keep Higgins in the club for yet another season. On June 26, 2017, CSKA announced that they had renewed their contract with Higgins, for an additional two years.

On July 3, 2019, Higgins signed a three-year deal with the Spanish powerhouse FC Barcelona. During the 2020–2021 season, he averaged 13.1 points and 2.4 assists per game. On July 5, 2021, Higgins signed a three-year extension with the team. On August 1, 2023, Higgins was informed that his contract would be terminated under the new policy of the club for financial viability.

== Coaching career ==
On October 19, 2025, the Brooklyn Nets hired Higgins to serve as a scout.

== Personal life ==
His father, Rod Higgins, is a former NBA player and the former president of the basketball operations for the Charlotte Bobcats. He majored in sociology. His godfather is former Chicago Bulls guard Michael Jordan.

== Career statistics ==
Legend
| GP | Games played | GS | Games started | MPG | Minutes per game |
| FG% | Field-goal percentage | 3P% | 3-point field-goal percentage | FT% | Free-throw percentage |
| RPG | Rebounds per game | APG | Assists per game | SPG | Steals per game |
| BPG | Blocks per game | PPG | Points per game | PIR | Performance index rating |
| **Bold** | Career high |

=== NBA ===
| Year | Team | GP | GS | MPG | FG% | 3P% | FT% | RPG | APG | SPG | BPG | PPG |
|---|---|---|---|---|---|---|---|---|---|---|---|---|
| 2011–12 | Charlotte | **38** | 0 | **11.1** | **.325** | **.200** | **.700** | **.9** | **.9** | .1 | **.1** | **3.9** |
| 2012–13 | Charlotte | 6 | 0 | 5.3 | .316 | **.200** | .500 | .5 | .8 | **.5** | .0 | 2.3 |
| Career | | 44 | 0 | 10.3 | .324 | .200 | .694 | .9 | .9 | .2 | .1 | 3.7 |

=== EuroLeague ===
| † | Denotes season in which Higgins won the EuroLeague |
| * | Led the league |

| Year | Team | GP | GS | MPG | FG% | 3P% | FT% | RPG | APG | SPG | BPG | PPG | PIR |
|---|---|---|---|---|---|---|---|---|---|---|---|---|---|
| 2015–16† | CSKA Moscow | 29 | 12 | 20.9 | .506 | **.540*** | .821 | 2.2 | 1.4 | .6 | .2 | 9.2 | 8.6 |
| 2016–17 | CSKA Moscow | 32 | 7 | 20.4 | .467 | .403 | .879 | 2.2 | 1.5 | .8 | .1 | 9.5 | 9.3 |
| 2017–18 | CSKA Moscow | 36* | 21 | 24.6 | **.543** | .455 | .806 | **2.4** | 1.9 | 1.0 | .1 | 14.2 | 13.8 |
| 2018–19† | CSKA Moscow | 32 | 11 | 25.4 | .492 | .490 | .897 | 2.2 | 1.8 | .4 | **.3** | **14.9** | **14.4** |
| 2019–20 | Barcelona | 23 | 20 | **26.6** | .454 | .400 | .817 | 2.1 | **2.7** | .7 | .1 | 12.4 | 11.7 |
| 2020–21 | Barcelona | **39** | **39*** | **26.6** | .465 | .371 | **.934** | 2.2 | 2.4 | **1.1** | **.3** | 13.1 | 13.8 |
| 2021–22 | Barcelona | 15 | 10 | 22.1 | .371 | .324 | .854 | 1.6 | 1.5 | .5 | **.3** | 8.7 | 7.5 |
| 2022–23 | Barcelona | 32 | 0 | 19.8 | .423 | .349 | .840 | 2.3 | 1.7 | .8 | .1 | 8.7 | 8.7 |
| Career | | 238 | 120 | 23.4 | .476 | .422 | .862 | 2.2 | 1.9 | .8 | .2 | 11.6 | 11.3 |
