= Xabier López-Arostegui =

Spanish basketball player

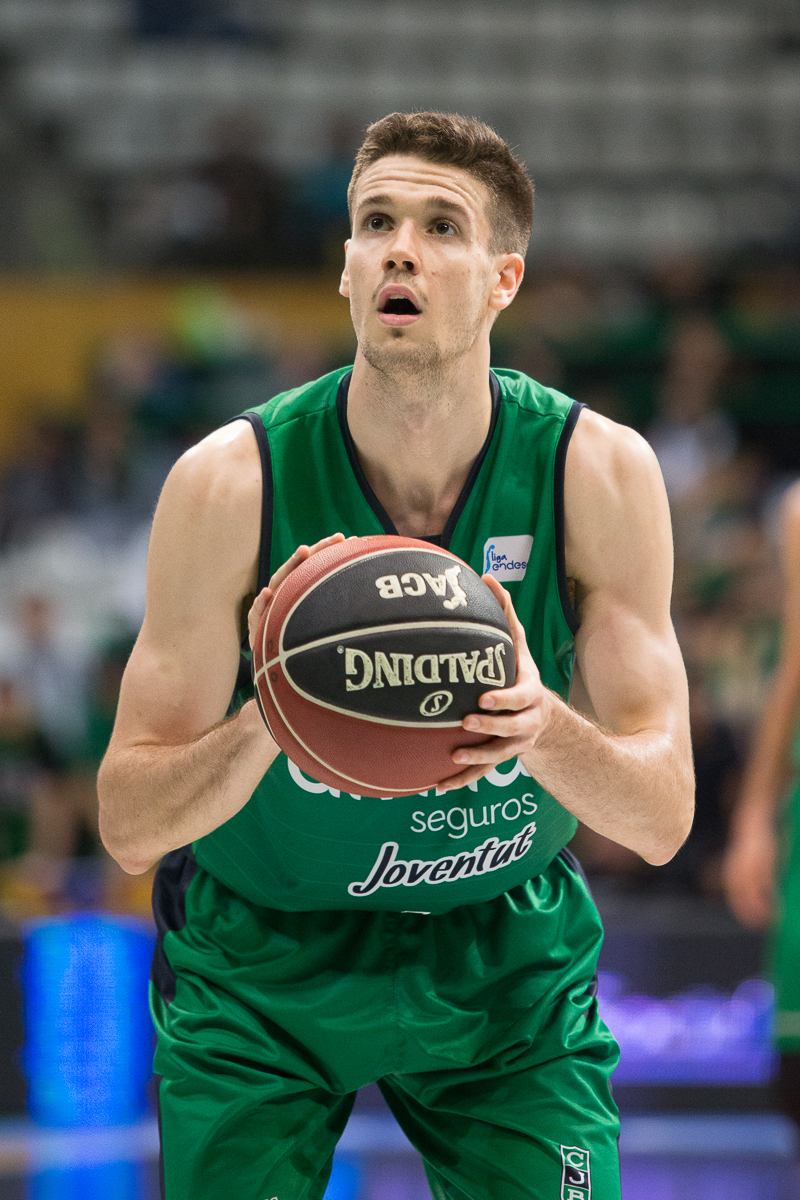
- López-Arostegui with Joventut in 2017

No. 7 – La Laguna Tenerife
- Position: Small forward
- League: Liga ACB; EuroCup

Personal information
- Born: 19 May 1997 (age 29) Getxo, Spain
- Listed height: 2.00 m (6 ft 7 in)

Career information
- Playing career: 2015–present

Career history
- 2015–2021: Joventut Badalona
- 2015–2017: →Prat
- 2021–2026: Valencia
- 2026–present: La Laguna Tenerife

Career highlights
- All-EuroCup Second Team (2025); Spanish Supercup winner (2025); All-Liga ACB First Team (2021); Liga ACB Free Throw Percentage leader (2021); ACB All-Young Players Team (2018, 2019)
Medals
Men's basketball
Representing Spain
EuroBasket
Gold medal – first place	2022 Czech Republic–Georgia–Italy–Germany

Xabier López-Arostegui Eskauriaza (born 19 May 1997) is a Spanish professional basketball player for La Laguna Tenerife of the Spanish Liga ACB and the EuroCup.

== Professional career ==
López-Arostegui started his career in the youth teams of Joventut Badalona. He was one of the outstanding players at the Catalan Junior Championship of 2015, as he won the title with his team after beating CB L'Hospitalet in the final.

In 2015, he was sent to affiliated team CB Prat on a two-way contract with Joventut.

On 18 April 2018, López-Arostegui declared for the 2018 NBA draft. However, he later withdrew.

On 5 July 2021, he has signed with Valencia Basket of the Liga ACB.

On July 4, 2026, he signed with La Laguna Tenerife of the Spanish Liga ACB.

== International career ==
López-Arostegui was with the U-17 Spain national basketball team.

== Career statistics ==
Legend
GP	Games played	GS	Games started	MPG	Minutes per game
FG%	Field-goal percentage	3P%	3-point field-goal percentage	FT%	Free-throw percentage
RPG	Rebounds per game	APG	Assists per game	SPG	Steals per game
BPG	Blocks per game	PPG	Points per game	PIR	Performance index rating
**Bold**	Career high

=== EuroLeague ===
Year	Team	GP	GS	MPG	FG%	3P%	FT%	RPG	APG	SPG	BPG	PPG	PIR
2022–23	Valencia	**31**	**7**	**18.8**	.417	**.377**	**.875**	**3.2**	**1.5**	**.7**	—	**6.5**	**7.6**
2023–24	Valencia	25	6	16.4	**.427**	.250	.833	**3.2**	.9	.4	—	5.1	6.2
Career		56	13	17.7	.421	.319	.863	3.2	1.2	.6	—	5.9	7.0
