= 2020–21 ACB season =

Liga Endesa^{1}
- Season: 2020–21
- Games played: 360
- Teams: 19

Regular season
- Season MVP: (Georgia (country)) Giorgi Shermadini
- Relegated: Movistar Estudiantes; Acunsa GBC

Finals
- Champions: Barça; 16th ACB title 19th Spanish title
- Runners-up: Real Madrid
- Semi-finalists: Lenovo Tenerife; Valencia Basket
- Finals MVP: (Spain) Nikola Mirotić

Statistical leaders
Points	(Georgia (country)) Giorgi Shermadini	16.5
Rebounds	(Czech Republic) Ondrej Balvin	8.6
Assists	(Spain) Dani Pérez	6.5

Records
- Biggest home win: Tenerife 107–62 Obradoiro (5 December 2020)
- Biggest away win: Betis 58–109 Barça (9 May 2021)
- Highest scoring: Unicaja 111–114 Betis (29 December 2020)
- Winning streak: 18 games Real Madrid
- Losing streak: 9 games Acunsa GBC
- ^{1} Sponsored league name, referring to Endesa.

The 2020–21 ACB season, also known as Liga Endesa for sponsorship reasons, was the 38th season of the top Spanish professional basketball league, since its establishment in 1983. It started on 19 September 2020 with the first round of the regular season and ended on 15 June 2021 with the finals.

It was the following season after the 2019–20 season was disrupted in response to the COVID-19 pandemic. Consequently, there were not relegations to LEB Oro and the league was expanded to 19 teams. This season was contested by odd-numbered teams for the third time in its history, which meant that each regular season round one team did not play any games.

TD Systems Baskonia was the defending champion which got knocked out by Valencia Basket in the quarterfinals. Barça claimed their 16th ACB title and their 19th Spanish title, ending a 7-year drought, by downing archrivals Real Madrid in Game 2 of the Finals. Barça swept the series and completed its first Spanish double (League and Cup titles) since 2011.

== Teams ==
=== Promotion and relegation (pre-season) ===
A total of 19 teams contested the league, including the same 18 sides from the 2019–20 season and one promoted from the 2019–20 LEB Oro.

Teams promoted from LEB Oro

- ~~Carramimbre CBC Valladolid~~ (did not request to join the league)
- Acunsa GBC (initially was not accepted to join the league, but was proceeded to the precautionary and provisional registration, in application of the precautionary measures issued by the judicial demand of the Basque club)

=== Venues and locations ===
Location of teams in 2020–21 ACB
Location of teams from the Canary Islands in 2020–21 ACB

Team	Home city	Arena	Capacity
Acunsa GBC	San Sebastián	Donostia Arena	11,000
Barça	Barcelona	Palau Blaugrana	7,585
Baxi Manresa	Manresa	Nou Congost	5,000
Casademont Zaragoza	Zaragoza	Pabellón Príncipe Felipe	10,744
Coosur Real Betis	Seville	San Pablo	7,242
Herbalife Gran Canaria	Las Palmas	Gran Canaria Arena	9,870
Hereda San Pablo Burgos	Burgos	Coliseum Burgos	9,000
Joventut	Badalona	Palau Municipal d'Esports	12,760
Lenovo Tenerife	San Cristóbal de La Laguna	Santiago Martín	5,100
Monbus Obradoiro	Santiago de Compostela	Multiusos Fontes do Sar	6,000
MoraBanc Andorra	Andorra la Vella	M.I. Govern Andorra	5,005
Movistar Estudiantes	Madrid	WiZink Center	13,109
Real Madrid	Madrid	WiZink Center	13,109
RETAbet Bilbao Basket	Bilbao	Bilbao Arena	10,014
TD Systems Baskonia	Vitoria-Gasteiz	Buesa Arena	15,716
UCAM Murcia	Murcia	Palacio de Deportes	7,454
Unicaja	Málaga	Martín Carpena	10,642
Urbas Fuenlabrada	Fuenlabrada	Fernando Martín	5,700
Valencia Basket	Valencia	La Fonteta	8,500

=== Personnel and sponsorship ===
Team	Head coach	Captain	Kit manufacturer	Shirt sponsor
Acunsa GBC	(Argentina) Marcelo Nicola	(Spain) Xabi Oroz	Hummel	Acunsa
Barça	(Lithuania) Šarūnas Jasikevičius	(Spain) Pierre Oriola	Nike	Assistència Sanitària
Baxi Manresa	(Spain) Pedro Martínez	(Spain) Guillem Jou	Pentex	Baxi
Casademont Zaragoza	(Spain) Luis Casimiro	(Spain) Rodrigo San Miguel	Mercury	Casademont
Coosur Real Betis	(Spain) Joan Plaza	(Spain) Pablo Almazán	Kappa	Coosur
Herbalife Gran Canaria	(Spain) Porfirio Fisac	(Spain) Javier Beirán	Spalding	Herbalife
Hereda San Pablo Burgos	(Spain) Joan Peñarroya	(Brazil) Vítor Benite	Hummel	Inmobiliaria San Pablo, Burgos
Joventut	(Spain) Carles Duran	(Spain) Albert Ventura	Spalding	Fundación Probitas
Lenovo Tenerife	(Spain) Txus Vidorreta	(Brazil) Marcelo Huertas	Austral	Lenovo, Tenerife
Monbus Obradoiro	(Spain) Moncho Fernández	(Spain) Pepe Pozas	Geff	Estrella Galicia 0,0
MoraBanc Andorra	(Spain) Ibon Navarro	(Andorra) Guillem Colom	Hummel	MoraBanc, Andorra
Movistar Estudiantes	(Spain) Jota Cuspinera	(Spain) Édgar Vicedo	Wibo	Movistar
Real Madrid	(Spain) Pablo Laso	(Spain) Felipe Reyes	Adidas	Palladium Hotel Group
RETAbet Bilbao Basket	(Spain) Álex Mumbrú	(France) Jonathan Rousselle	Hummel	RETAbet
TD Systems Baskonia	(Montenegro) Duško Ivanović	(Spain) Ilimane Diop	Kelme	TD Systems
UCAM Murcia	(Spain) Sito Alonso	(Dominican Republic) Sadiel Rojas	Hummel	UCAM, Costa Cálida
Unicaja	(Greece) Fotios Katsikaris	(Spain) Carlos Suárez	Joma	Unicaja, Málaga
Urbas Fuenlabrada	(Spain) Josep María Raventós	(Democratic Republic of the Congo) Christian Eyenga	Pentex	URBAS Grupo Financiero
Valencia Basket	(Spain) Jaume Ponsarnau	(Montenegro) Bojan Dubljević	Luanvi	Cultura del Esfuerzo (Note: Cultura del Esfuerzo (transl. "Culture of Effort") is the motto of the club.)

=== Managerial changes ===
Team	Outgoing manager	Manner of departure	Date of vacancy	Position in table	Replaced with	Date of appointment
Herbalife Gran Canaria	(Greece) Fotios Katsikaris	End of contract	30 June 2020	Pre-season	(Spain) Porfirio Fisac	8 July 2020
Barça	(Serbia) Svetislav Pešić	Sacked	1 July 2020	Pre-season	(Lithuania) Šarūnas Jasikevičius	2 July 2020
Casademont Zaragoza	(Spain) Porfirio Fisac	Resigned	8 July 2020	Pre-season	(Spain) Diego Ocampo	11 July 2020
Urbas Fuenlabrada	(Spain) Paco García	Sacked	19 October 2020	19th (0–5)	(Spain) Javi Juárez	19 October 2020
Casademont Zaragoza	(Spain) Diego Ocampo	Sacked	2 November 2020	16th (2–6)	(Argentina) Sergio Hernández	3 November 2020
Coosur Real Betis	(Spain) Curro Segura	Sacked	24 November 2020	17th (2–9)	(Spain) Joan Plaza	30 November 2020
Unicaja	(Spain) Luis Casimiro	Sacked	20 January 2021	9th (9–10)	(Greece) Fotios Katsikaris	21 January 2021
Movistar Estudiantes	(Spain) Javier Zamora	Sacked	13 February 2021	16th (5–14)	(Spain) Jota Cuspinera	14 February 2021
Urbas Fuenlabrada	(Spain) Javi Juárez	Sacked	25 March 2021	16th (7–19)	(Spain) Josep María Raventós	25 March 2021
Casademont Zaragoza	(Argentina) Sergio Hernández	Resigned	17 April 2021	13th (10–19)	(Spain) Luis Casimiro	17 April 2021

== Regular season ==
=== League table ===
Pos	Team	Pld	W	L	PF	PA	PD	Qualification or relegation
1	Real Madrid	36	34	2	3132	2741	+391	Qualification to playoffs
2	Barça	36	32	4	3162	2621	+541	Qualification to playoffs
3	Lenovo Tenerife	36	27	9	3147	2861	+286	Qualification to playoffs
4	Valencia Basket	36	24	12	3107	2917	+190	Qualification to playoffs
5	TD Systems Baskonia	36	23	13	2952	2814	+138	Qualification to playoffs
6	Hereda San Pablo Burgos	36	22	14	3130	2995	+135	Qualification to playoffs
7	Joventut	36	20	16	3089	3070	+19	Qualification to playoffs
8	Herbalife Gran Canaria	36	18	18	2931	3004	−73	Qualification to playoffs
9	MoraBanc Andorra	36	17	19	2850	2866	−16	
10	Baxi Manresa	36	17	19	3017	3134	−117	
11	Unicaja	36	17	19	3014	2997	+17	
12	UCAM Murcia	36	16	20	2924	2951	−27	
13	Casademont Zaragoza	36	14	22	3127	3189	−62	
14	Monbus Obradoiro	36	12	24	2888	3015	−127	
15	Urbas Fuenlabrada	36	12	24	2920	3019	−99	
16	Coosur Real Betis	36	11	25	2786	3032	−246	
17	RETAbet Bilbao Basket	36	10	26	2880	3118	−238	
18	Movistar Estudiantes	36	9	27	2969	3185	−216	Relegation to LEB Oro
19	Acunsa GBC	36	7	29	2650	3146	−496	Relegation to LEB Oro

Source: ACB
Rules for classification: 1) Win–loss record; 2) Head–to–head record; 3) Head–to–head point difference; 4) Point difference; 5) Points scored; 6) Sum of quotients of points scored (Note: Head–to–head record is used only after all the matches between the teams in question have been played)

=== Positions by round ===
The table lists the positions of teams after completion of each round. In order to preserve chronological evolvements, any postponed matches are not included in the round at which they were originally scheduled, but added to the full round they were played immediately afterwards.

Team ╲ Round	1	2	3	4	5	6	7	8	9	10	11	12	13	14	15	16	17	18	19	20	21	22	23	24	25	26	27	28	29	30	31	32	33	34	35	36	37	38
Real Madrid	3	1	1	1	1	1	1	1	1	1	1	1	1	1	1	1	1	1	1	1	1	1	1	1	1	1	1	1	1	1	1	1	1	1	1	1	1	1
Barça	8	6	3	2	5	3	3	3	3	3	3	3	3	3	3	3	3	2	2	2	2	2	2	2	2	2	2	2	2	2	2	2	2	2	2	2	2	2
Lenovo Tenerife	6	5	5	3	2	2	2	2	2	2	2	2	2	2	2	2	2	3	3	3	3	3	4	4	4	4	4	3	3	3	3	3	3	3	3	3	3	3
Valencia Basket	12	8	7	8	10	13	9	8	11	10	11	12	10	8	8	8	7	6	6	6	6	6	5	5	5	5	5	6	6	5	5	5	5	5	5	4	4	4
TD Systems Baskonia	9	4	4	5	7	5	7	4	4	4	4	5	4	4	4	4	4	4	4	4	4	4	3	3	3	3	3	4	4	4	4	4	4	4	4	5	5	5
Hereda San Pablo Burgos	11	7	6	4	3	4	6	7	9	5	5	4	7	6	6	5	5	5	5	5	5	5	6	6	6	6	6	5	5	6	6	6	6	6	6	6	6	6
Joventut	4	2	8	7	4	7	5	6	5	6	6	6	5	5	5	6	6	7	7	7	7	7	7	7	7	7	7	7	7	7	7	7	7	7	7	7	7	7
Herbalife Gran Canaria	5	12	14	12	18	18	19	18	18	17	17	18	18	16	15	13	13	13	12	12	13	14	13	13	12	12	11	11	11	9	10	10	10	10	9	10	9	8
MoraBanc Andorra	2	9	9	13	11	9	11	13	13	13	14	10	9	11	9	10	11	11	11	11	10	10	10	10	10	10	9	9	10	11	11	11	13	13	12	8	10	9
Baxi Manresa	7	10	12	10	12	10	8	12	8	7	8	9	11	10	10	11	10	10	10	8	8	8	8	8	9	8	10	10	9	10	9	9	8	8	10	11	11	10
Unicaja	16	17	13	16	13	12	13	10	6	8	7	7	6	7	7	7	8	8	8	9	9	9	9	9	8	9	8	8	8	8	8	8	9	9	8	9	8	11
UCAM Murcia	18	11	11	9	8	11	10	9	10	11	10	8	8	9	11	9	9	9	9	10	11	11	12	12	13	13	13	13	13	12	12	12	11	12	13	13	12	12
Casademont Zaragoza	15	18	10	17	17	14	14	15	16	16	15	15	15	15	16	16	16	15	15	14	12	12	11	11	11	11	12	12	12	13	13	13	12	11	11	12	13	13
Monbus Obradoiro	1	3	2	6	6	6	4	5	7	9	9	11	12	13	12	12	12	12	13	13	14	13	14	14	14	14	15	15	15	14	14	14	14	14	15	14	14	14
Urbas Fuenlabrada	19	19	17	19	19	19	16	14	14	14	12	13	14	14	13	15	14	16	16	16	15	15	15	16	15	16	16	17	16	15	15	15	16	15	14	15	15	15
Coosur Real Betis	10	14	15	11	15	15	17	17	15	15	16	17	17	18	18	18	17	17	17	17	17	17	17	17	18	17	17	16	17	17	17	16	15	16	16	16	16	16
RETAbet Bilbao Basket	14	15	19	14	16	16	15	16	17	18	18	16	16	17	17	17	18	18	18	18	18	19	19	19	17	19	19	18	18	18	18	18	18	18	18	17	17	17
Movistar Estudiantes	13	16	18	15	9	8	12	11	12	12	13	14	13	12	14	14	15	14	14	15	16	16	16	15	16	15	14	14	14	16	16	17	17	17	17	18	18	18
Acunsa GBC	17	13	16	18	14	17	18	19	19	19	19	19	19	19	19	19	19	19	19	19	19	18	18	18	19	18	18	19	19	19	19	19	19	19	19	19	19	19

Leader and qualification to playoffs
Qualification to playoffs
Relegation to LEB Oro

Source: ACB

=== Results ===
Home \ Away	GBC	BAR	BAX	CAZ	BET	HGC	BUR	CJB	LNT	MOB	MBA	MOV	RMB	RBB	TDS	UCM	UNI	URF	VBC
Acunsa GBC	—	68–110	71–78	70–67	68–91	65–79	77–90	68–99	89–87	66–79	86–82	81–79	70–86	74–97	63–81	78–88	75–81	72–100	78–60
Barça	87–60	—	97–89	107–88	82–53	91–63	89–86	88–74	81–74	76–70	82–71	98–68	85–87	82–64	87–74	92–63	79–55	81–79	90–100
Baxi Manresa	91–83	76–99	—	92–82	93–81	64–71	87–101	85–80	80–88	76–80	64–69	102–101	76–77	94–78	71–68	85–84	90–83	90–76	74–82
Casademont Zaragoza	99–71	85–97	102–103	—	96–95	88–71	86–100	95–100	60–91	83–70	99–89	104–113	89–98	105–76	89–92	98–86	63–92	105–85	76–85
Coosur Real Betis	74–62	58–109	86–70	82–85	—	69–74	76–85	57–78	82–93	88–87	69–61	80–81	65–84	89–96	73–77	55–84	78–75	86–79	95–85
Herbalife Gran Canaria	90–81	74–92	83–77	84–76	78–54	—	83–74	96–85	87–108	75–85	62–79	97–94	65–90	107–102	71–75	91–81	80–84	87–71	92–86
Hereda San Pablo Burgos	79–90	77–93	91–80	95–98	95–77	92–60	—	86–78	86–98	83–77	82–68	91–71	60–74	96–86	91–89	89–84	95–83	78–99	78–83
Joventut	90–94	62–80	96–68	88–81	78–88	84–103	78–95	—	90–85	91–84	99–92	97–70	64–87	88–81	83–82	104–93	81–73	80–75	80–91
Lenovo Tenerife	98–69	72–96	85–70	91–86	77–73	99–80	84–79	86–82	—	107–62	93–81	101–77	85–92	86–67	79–81	85–78	79–61	91–87	90–86
Monbus Obradoiro	85–76	75–78	90–87	102–91	87–80	89–88	63–78	83–87	71–97	—	79–51	87–91	71–87	80–72	78–87	80–83	83–85	101–82	77–78
MoraBanc Andorra	105–71	63–79	92–86	83–98	72–55	86–81	87–82	87–89	83–89	90–71	—	81–73	69–75	72–70	68–82	84–66	78–81	85–71	84–72
Movistar Estudiantes	80–61	78–92	84–88	73–79	82–96	94–68	82–88	83–90	64–90	83–94	97–85	—	65–79	95–89	84–86	75–85	90–92	86–87	81–86
Real Madrid	97–71	82–87	100–78	102–83	95–77	81–80	96–81	101–92	84–76	84–77	86–79	93–77	—	70–59	92–83	98–87	91–84	79–68	69–79
RETAbet Bilbao Basket	81–80	73–90	96–108	73–96	86–84	71–92	98–89	94–73	70–81	99–81	76–85	77–78	83–85	—	72–85	63–73	75–91	87–82	73–106
TD Systems Baskonia	83–71	82–71	87–68	89–61	103–76	78–99	83–94	71–79	79–72	80–74	84–67	96–92	74–85	82–68	—	75–83	70–79	90–74	76–73
UCAM Murcia	90–73	77–73	93–103	91–68	74–72	74–78	75–81	84–91	82–84	93–76	76–79	93–80	58–74	82–90	92–87	—	81–68	84–81	66–80
Unicaja	104–69	70–79	86–90	78–101	111–114	82–76	93–101	102–93	79–86	82–76	85–92	91–77	90–96	88–74	79–91	102–81	—	84–90	85–89
Urbas Fuenlabrada	78–74	67–83	100–102	82–81	101–77	102–81	89–83	93–84	98–65	84–82	65–75	81–82	76–90	70–74	73–89	70–82	68–85	—	61–68
Valencia Basket	101–75	64–80	112–82	93–84	89–81	101–85	81–99	89–102	89–95	97–82	91–76	100–89	78–86	99–90	83–61	89–78	66–71	96–76	—

Source: ACB
Legend: Blue = home team win; Red = away team win.

== Playoffs ==
Quarterfinals
1	Real Madrid	103	81	–	2
8	Herbalife Gran Canaria	79	75	–	0
4	Valencia Basket	87	65	78	2
5	TD Systems Baskonia	86	76	73	1
2	Barça	84	63	94	2
7	Joventut	74	72	73	1
3	Lenovo Tenerife	86	92	–	2
6	Hereda San Pablo Burgos	78	68	–	0

Semifinals
1	Real Madrid	81	67	80	2
4	Valencia Basket	70	85	77	1
2	Barça	112	68	89	2
3	Lenovo Tenerife	69	80	72	1

Finals
1	Real Madrid	75	73	–	0
2	Barça	89	92	–	2

== Final standings ==
Pos	Team	Pld	W	L	Qualification or relegation
1	Barça (C)	44	38	6	Already qualified to EuroLeague
2	Real Madrid	43	38	5	Already qualified to EuroLeague
3	Lenovo Tenerife	41	30	11	Qualification to Champions League regular season
4	Valencia Basket	42	27	15	Qualification to EuroCup
5	TD Systems Baskonia	39	24	15	Already qualified to EuroLeague
6	Hereda San Pablo Burgos	38	22	16	Qualification to Champions League regular season
7	Joventut	39	21	18	Qualification to EuroCup
8	Herbalife Gran Canaria	38	18	20	Qualification to EuroCup
9	MoraBanc Andorra	36	17	19	Qualification to EuroCup
10	Baxi Manresa	36	17	19	Qualification to Champions League regular season
11	Unicaja	36	17	19	Qualification to Champions League regular season
12	UCAM Murcia	36	16	20	
13	Casademont Zaragoza	36	14	22	Qualification to FIBA Europe Cup regular season
14	Monbus Obradoiro	36	12	24	
15	Urbas Fuenlabrada	36	12	24	
16	Coosur Real Betis	36	11	25	
17	RETAbet Bilbao Basket	36	10	26	
18	Movistar Estudiantes (R)	36	9	27	Relegation to LEB Oro
19	Acunsa GBC (R)	36	7	29	Relegation to LEB Oro

Source: ACB
(C) Champions; (R) Relegated

== Attendances ==
The first 36 regular season rounds were played behind closed doors in response to the COVID-19 pandemic. On May 17, 2021, the Ministry of Culture of Spain, the Ministry of Health of Spain and the Spanish High Council for Sports allowed the return of the spectators to the league arenas for the last two regular season rounds and for the playoffs with the following requirements:

- Autonomous community with a cumulative incidence in the last 7 days of less than 25 cases per 100,000 inhabitants and a cumulative incidence in the last 14 days of less than 50 cases per 100,000 inhabitants.
- Maximum attendance of the 25 per cent of the seating capacity of the arena and, in any case, regardless of this capacity, the maximum attendance is 1,500 people.
- Use of FFP2 face masks without exhalation valve for the attendants.
- Conduct temperature checks at the arena entrance.

On June 2, 2021, the Spanish High Council for Sports allowed the general admission of the spectators for the playoffs, indicating that the maximum number of spectators is 1,000 people.

Pos	Team	Total	High	Low	Average
1	UCAM Murcia	1,500	1,500	1,500	1,500
2	Valencia Basket	5,000	1,500	1,000	1,250
3	Monbus Obradoiro	1,164	1,164	1,164	1,164
4	Barça	3,000	1,000	1,000	1,000
5	Real Madrid	3,000	1,000	1,000	1,000
6	Joventut	1,000	1,000	1,000	1,000
7	Lenovo Tenerife	1,000	1,000	1,000	1,000
8	MoraBanc Andorra	900	900	900	900
9	Hereda San Pablo Burgos	879	879	879	879
10	Herbalife Gran Canaria	200	200	200	200
	League total	17,643	1,500	200	1,038

Updated to match(es) played on 13 June 2021. Source: ACB

== Awards ==
All official awards of the 2020–21 ACB season.

=== MVP ===
Pos.	Player	Team
C	(Georgia (country)) Giorgi Shermadini	Lenovo Tenerife

=== Finals MVP ===
Pos.	Player	Team
PF	(Spain) Nikola Mirotić	Barça

=== All-ACB Teams ===
Pos.	First Team		Second Team	
Pos.	Player	Team	Player	Team
PG	(Brazil) Marcelo Huertas	Lenovo Tenerife	(United States) Melo Trimble	Urbas Fuenlabrada
SG	(United States) Pierriá Henry	TD Systems Baskonia	(United States) Cory Higgins	Barça
SF	(Spain) Xabier López-Arostegui	Joventut	(Lithuania) Rokas Giedraitis	TD Systems Baskonia
PF	(Georgia (country)) Giorgi Shermadini	Lenovo Tenerife	(Spain) Nikola Mirotić	Barça
C	(Cape Verde) Edy Tavares	Real Madrid	(Cuba) Jasiel Rivero	Hereda San Pablo Burgos

=== Best Young Player Award ===
Pos.	Player	Team
PF	(Spain) Usman Garuba	Real Madrid

=== Best All-Young Team ===
Pos.	Player	Team
PG	(Spain) Carlos Alocén	Real Madrid
SG	(Argentina) Leandro Bolmaro	Barça
SF	(Montenegro) Dino Radončić	Acunsa GBC
PF	(Spain) Usman Garuba	Real Madrid
C	(Republic of the Congo) Yannick Nzosa	Unicaja

=== Best Defender ===
Pos.	Player	Team
C	(Cape Verde) Edy Tavares	Real Madrid

=== Player of the round ===
Round	Player	Team	PIR
1	(Lithuania) Laurynas Birutis	Monbus Obradoiro	42
2	(Spain) Nikola Mirotić	Barça	29
2	(Serbia) Dejan Kravić	Hereda San Pablo Burgos	29
3	(Argentina) Nicolás Laprovíttola	Real Madrid	32
4	(United States) Melo Trimble	Urbas Fuenlabrada	37
5	(Georgia (country)) Giorgi Shermadini	Lenovo Tenerife	29
5	(Colombia) Jaime Echenique	Acunsa GBC	29
6	(Spain) Marc García	Urbas Fuenlabrada	39
7	(United States) Alex Renfroe	Hereda San Pablo Burgos	36
8	(United States) Jeremy Senglin	MoraBanc Andorra	35
9	(Lithuania) Laurynas Birutis (2)	Monbus Obradoiro	37
10	(Romania) Emanuel Cățe	UCAM Murcia	34
11	(Cuba) Jasiel Rivero	Hereda San Pablo Burgos	30
12	(Czech Republic) Ondřej Balvín	RETAbet Bilbao Basket	41
13	(Spain) Xabier López-Arostegui	Joventut	39
14	(Georgia (country)) Giorgi Shermadini (2)	Lenovo Tenerife	30
15	(Canada) Kassius Robertson	Monbus Obradoiro	35
16	(Spain) Nikola Mirotić (2)	Barça	41
17	(United States) Melo Trimble (2)	Urbas Fuenlabrada	34
18	(Senegal) Youssoupha Fall	TD Systems Baskonia	38
19	(Georgia (country)) Giorgi Shermadini (3)	Lenovo Tenerife	33
20	(Iceland) Tryggvi Hlinason	Casademont Zaragoza	33
21	(Brazil) Léonardo Meindl	Urbas Fuenlabrada	44
22	(United States) Mike Tobey	Valencia Basket	34
23	(Montenegro) Bojan Dubljević	Valencia Basket	29
24	(Cape Verde) Edy Tavares	Real Madrid	37
25	(Poland) A. J. Slaughter	Herbalife Gran Canaria	41
26	(Cape Verde) Edy Tavares (2)	Real Madrid	37
27	(Armenia) Steven Enoch	Monbus Obradoiro	34
28	(Spain) Pau Ribas	Joventut	39
29	(Czech Republic) Ondřej Balvín (2)	RETAbet Bilbao Basket	36
30	(Senegal) Youssou Ndoye	Coosur Real Betis	33
31	(Lithuania) Rokas Giedraitis	TD Systems Baskonia	40
32	(Canada) Kyle Alexander	Urbas Fuenlabrada	36
33	(Dominican Republic) Ángel Delgado	Movistar Estudiantes	36
34	(Brazil) Vítor Benite	Hereda San Pablo Burgos	43
35	(Montenegro) Nemanja Đurišić	Movistar Estudiantes	33
36	(Republic of the Congo) Viny Okouo	Acunsa GBC	33
37	(Georgia (country)) Giorgi Shermadini (4)	Lenovo Tenerife	31
38	(Slovakia) Vladimír Brodziansky	Joventut	31

=== Player of the month ===
Month	Rounds	Player	Team	PIR	W–L	Ref
September	1–3	(Lithuania) Laurynas Birutis	Monbus Obradoiro	27.7	3–0	
October	4–8	(Georgia (country)) Giorgi Shermadini	Lenovo Tenerife	28.7	3–0	
November	9–12	(France) Louis Labeyrie	Valencia Basket	26.0	0–3	
December	13–17	(Canada) Dylan Ennis	Casademont Zaragoza	23.6	2–3	
January	18–22	(Georgia (country)) Giorgi Shermadini (2)	Lenovo Tenerife	27.0	3–2	
February	23–24	(Cape Verde) Edy Tavares	Real Madrid	27.7	3–0	
March	25–28	(Georgia (country)) Giorgi Shermadini (3)	Lenovo Tenerife	25.5	2–0	
March	25–28	(Georgia (country)) Thad McFadden	Hereda San Pablo Burgos	25.5	2–0	
April	29–34	(Dominican Republic) Ángel Delgado	Movistar Estudiantes	24.0	0–6	
May	35–38	(Dominican Republic) Ángel Delgado (2)	Movistar Estudiantes	27.0	0–3	

== ACB clubs in international competitions ==
Euroleague Basketball competitions
Team	Competition	Progress	Result	W–L
Barça	EuroLeague	Championship game	Loss vs. (Turkey) Anadolu Efes	28–13
Barça	EuroLeague	Semifinals	Win vs. (Italy) A|X Armani Exchange Milan	28–13
Barça	EuroLeague	Playoffs	3–2 vs. (Russia) Zenit Saint Petersburg	28–13
Barça	EuroLeague	Regular season	1st of 18 teams (24–10)	28–13
Real Madrid	EuroLeague	Playoffs	2–3 vs. (Turkey) Anadolu Efes	22–17
Real Madrid	EuroLeague	Regular season	6th of 18 teams (20–14)	22–17
Valencia Basket	EuroLeague	Regular season	9th of 18 teams (19–15)	19–15
TD Systems Baskonia	EuroLeague	Regular season	10th of 18 teams (18–16)	18–16
Herbalife Gran Canaria	EuroCup	Semifinals	0–2 vs. (France) Monaco	13–7
Herbalife Gran Canaria	EuroCup	Quarterfinals	2–0 vs. (France) Metropolitans 92	13–7
Herbalife Gran Canaria	EuroCup	Top 16 Group H	2nd of 4 teams (3–3)	13–7
Herbalife Gran Canaria	EuroCup	Regular season Group D	1st of 6 teams (8–2)	13–7
Joventut	EuroCup	Quarterfinals	0–2 vs. (Italy) Segafredo Virtus Bologna	12–6
Joventut	EuroCup	Top 16 Group E	2nd of 4 teams (4–2)	12–6
Joventut	EuroCup	Regular season Group A	1st of 6 teams (8–2)	12–6
MoraBanc Andorra	EuroCup	Top 16 Group H	3rd of 4 teams (3–3)	6–10
MoraBanc Andorra	EuroCup	Regular season Group C	4th of 6 teams (3–7)	6–10
Unicaja	EuroCup	Top 16 Group E	4th of 4 teams (1–5)	8–8
Unicaja	EuroCup	Regular season Group B	2nd of 6 teams (7–3)	8–8

FIBA competitions
Team	Competition	Progress	Result	W–L
Hereda San Pablo Burgos	Intercontinental Cup	Final	Win vs. (Argentina) Quimsa	1–0
Hereda San Pablo Burgos	Champions League	Final	Win vs. (Turkey) Pınar Karşıyaka	12–3
Hereda San Pablo Burgos	Champions League	Semi-finals	Win vs. (France) SIG Strasbourg	12–3
Hereda San Pablo Burgos	Champions League	Quarter-finals	Win vs. (Israel) Hapoel Holon	12–3
Hereda San Pablo Burgos	Champions League	Play-offs Group J	2nd of 4 teams (4–2)	12–3
Hereda San Pablo Burgos	Champions League	Regular season Group H	1st of 4 teams (5–1)	12–3
Casademont Zaragoza	Champions League	Third place game	Win vs. (France) SIG Strasbourg	11–4
Casademont Zaragoza	Champions League	Semi-finals	Loss vs. (Turkey) Pınar Karşıyaka	11–4
Casademont Zaragoza	Champions League	Quarter-finals	Win vs. (Russia) Nizhny Novgorod	11–4
Casademont Zaragoza	Champions League	Play-offs Group L	2nd of 4 teams (4–2)	11–4
Casademont Zaragoza	Champions League	Regular season Group D	1st of 4 teams (5–1)	11–4
Lenovo Tenerife	Champions League	Quarter-finals	Loss vs. (France) SIG Strasbourg	9–4
Lenovo Tenerife	Champions League	Play-offs Group J	1st of 4 teams (5–1)	9–4
Lenovo Tenerife	Champions League	Regular season Group A	1st of 4 teams (4–2)	9–4
RETAbet Bilbao Basket	Champions League	Regular season Group F	3rd of 4 teams (2–4)	2–4
