= Carlos Alocén =

Spanish basketball player

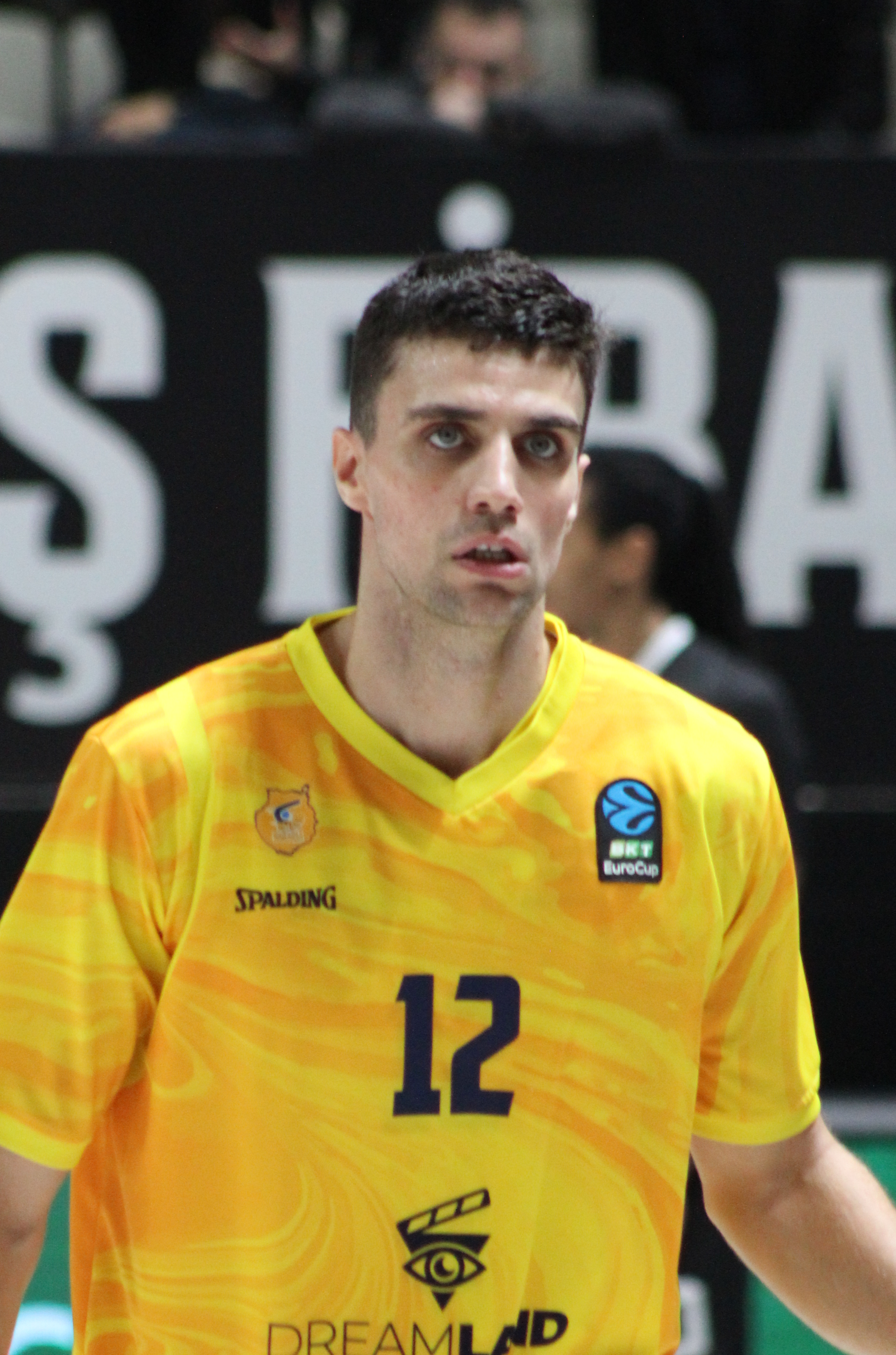
- Alocén with Gran Canaria in 2024

No. 12 – Gran Canaria
- Position: Point guard
- League: Liga ACB

Personal information
- Born: 30 December 2000 (age 25) Zaragoza, Spain
- Listed height: 1.94 m (6 ft 4 in)
- Listed weight: 84 kg (185 lb)

Career information
- Playing career: 2016–present

Career history
- 2016–2019: Zaragoza
- 2019–2024: Real Madrid
- 2019–2020: → Zaragoza
- 2024–present: Gran Canaria

Career highlights
- 2× ACB Best Young Player (2019, 2020); 2× ACB All-Young Players Team (2019, 2020); Champions League Best Young Player (2020)
Medals
Men's basketball
Representing Spain
FIBA U20 European Championship
Silver medal – second place	2019 Israel	Team
FIBA U16 European Championship
Gold medal – first place	2016 Poland	Team

Carlos Alocén Arrondo (born 30 December 2000) is a Spanish professional basketball player who plays for CB Gran Canaria of the Spanish Liga ACB. He plays at the point guard position.

== Early life and career ==
Alocén grew up playing basketball at the youth level for Zaragoza. He made his professional debut on 30 October 2016, playing for Zaragoza in a Liga ACB game against Real Madrid. At age 15 years and 10 months, Alocén became the youngest ACB debutant in club history, breaking Sergi García's record. He also became the third-youngest player in Liga ACB history, behind Ángel Rebolo and Ricky Rubio. At the end of the 2018-19 ACB season, Alocén signed with Real Madrid, but remained on loan at Zaragoza for one season. Alocén was named the Best Young Player of the 2019–20 Basketball Champions League.

On 15 July 2020, he joined Real Madrid's first team. In February 2022 he tore his ACL, which halted his career for 21 months. Eventually, on June 18, 2024, Alocén left Real Madrid to join CB Gran Canaria.

== National team career ==
Playing with the Spanish team, Alocén won gold at the 2016 FIBA U16 European Championship, averaging 9.9 points, 6.4 assists (tournament leader), 2 steals and 2.3 rebounds. Earlier that year he had also played at the 2016 FIBA Under-17 World Championship in his hometown Zaragoza, finishing fourth. In February 2019, Alocén made his first appearance for the Spain men's national basketball team.

== Career statistics ==
Legend
GP	Games played	GS	Games started	MPG	Minutes per game
FG%	Field-goal percentage	3P%	3-point field-goal percentage	FT%	Free-throw percentage
RPG	Rebounds per game	APG	Assists per game	SPG	Steals per game
BPG	Blocks per game	PPG	Points per game	PIR	Performance index rating
**Bold**	Career high

=== EuroLeague ===
Year	Team	GP	GS	MPG	FG%	3P%	FT%	RPG	APG	SPG	BPG	PPG	PIR
2020–21	Real Madrid	**28**	**16**	**13.4**	**.430**	**.282**	.583	**1.4**	**2.3**	.2	**.1**	**3.9**	**3.3**
2021–22	Real Madrid	9	2	10.8	.226	.125	**.800**	1.3	1.6	**.3**	—	2.7	2.4
2023–24	Real Madrid	12	3	8.8	.219	.091	.600	1.3	1.4	.2	**.1**	1.5	1.5
Career		49	21	11.8	.353	.212	.667	1.3	1.9	.2	.1	3.1	2.7

=== Basketball Champions League ===
Year	Team	GP	GS	MPG	FG%	3P%	FT%	RPG	APG	SPG	BPG	PPG
2019–20	Zaragoza	16	12	23.3	.393	.200	.607	3.4	3.7	.9	.1	7.0
Career		16	12	23.3	.393	.200	.607	3.4	3.7	.9	.1	7.0

=== Domestic leagues ===
Year	Team	League	GP	MPG	FG%	3P%	FT%	RPG	APG	SPG	BPG	PPG
2016–17	(Spain) Zaragoza	ACB	2	2.5	.000	.000	—	—	—	—	—	0.0
2017–18	(Spain) Zaragoza	ACB	4	14.2	.385	.250	.000	2.2	2.2	—	—	2.7
2018–19	(Spain) Zaragoza	ACB	37	15.9	.458	.400	.644	1.6	2.4	.6	.0	5.4
2019–20	(Spain) Zaragoza	ACB	28	20.5	.453	.351	.700	2.5	3.4	.5	.1	7.2
2020–21	(Spain) Real Madrid	ACB	38	13.8	.344	.275	.722	1.9	2.0	.4	.0	4.7
2021–22	(Spain) Real Madrid	ACB	11	10.2	.316	.318	.625	1.2	.9	.4	—	3.3
2023–24	(Spain) Real Madrid	ACB	18	11.1	.283	.167	.773	1.3	1.8	.7	.2	3.1
