= Louis Labeyrie =

French basketball player (born 1992)

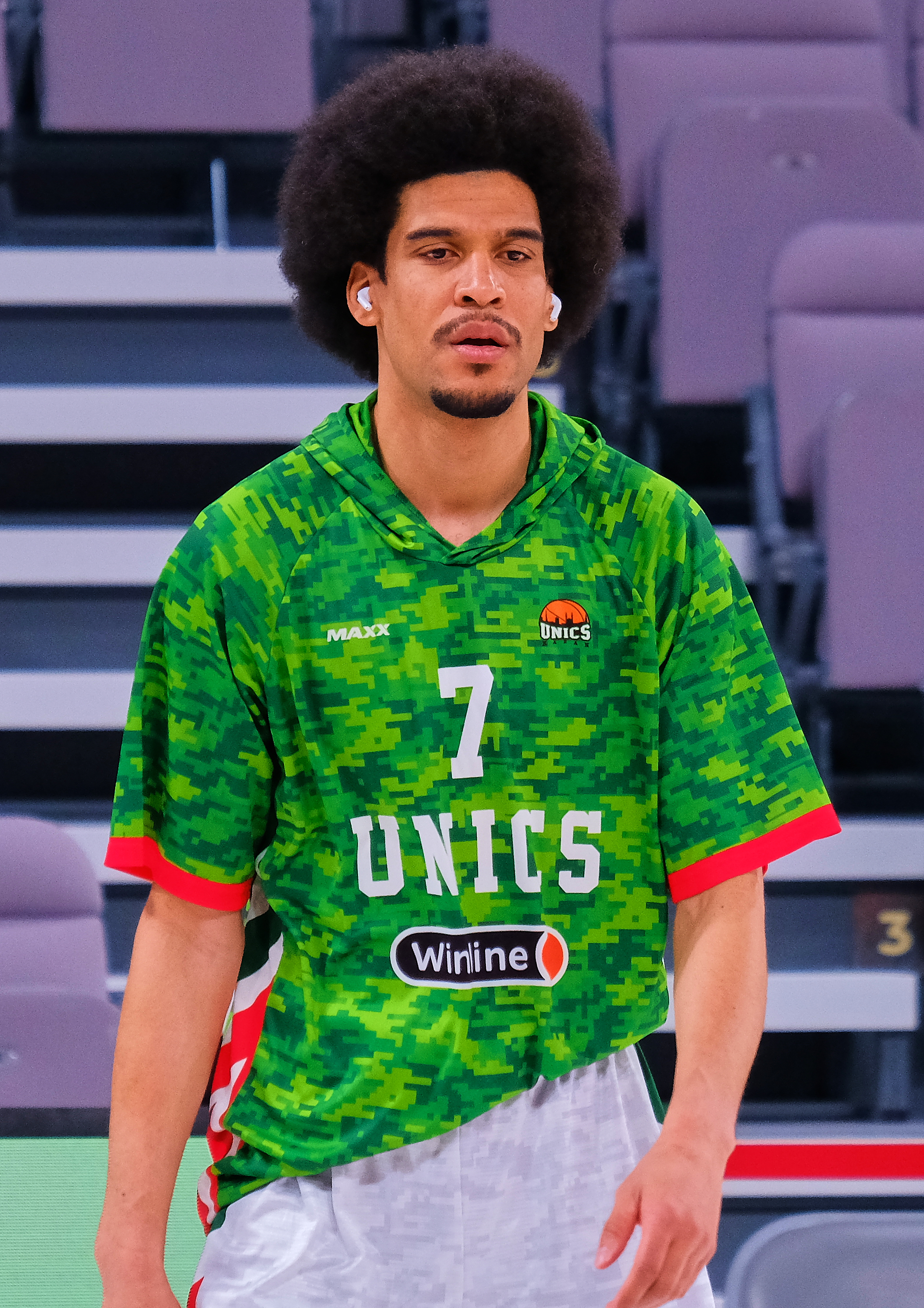
- Labeyrie with UNICS Kazan in 2025

No. 13 – Limoges
- Position: Power forward / center
- League: LNB Élite

Personal information
- Born: 11 February 1992 (age 34) Gonesse, France
- Listed height: 6 ft 10 in (2.08 m)
- Listed weight: 220 lb (100 kg)

Career information
- NBA draft: 2014: 2nd round, 57th overall pick
- Drafted by: Indiana Pacers
- Playing career: 2008–present

Career history
- 2008–2011: Fos Provence
- 2011–2012: Hyères-Toulon
- 2012–2017: Paris-Levallois
- 2017–2018: SIG Strasbourg
- 2018–2022: Valencia
- 2022–2025: UNICS Kazan
- 2025–2026: Gran Canaria
- 2026: SIG Strasbourg
- 2026–present: Limoges

Career highlights
- EuroCup champion (2019); BCL Star Lineup Best Team (2018); All-VTB United League First Team (2023); 2× French Cup winner (2013, 2018); Pro A Sixth Man of the Year (2017)
- Stats at Basketball Reference

Louis Labeyrie (born 11 February 1992) is a French professional basketball player for Limoges CSP of the French LNB Élite. He plays the power forward and center positions.

== Professional career ==
From 2008 to 2011, Labeyrie played for Fos Provence Basket. In 2011, he signed with Hyeres-Toulon for the 2011–12 season.

On 10 July 2012 he signed a three-year deal with Paris-Levallois.

In July 2015 he joined the Knicks for the NBA Summer League.

On 27 July 2018 Labeyrie signed a two-year deal with Valencia Basket of the Liga ACB. He extended his contract for two seasons on 3 July 2020. On 27 July 2022, Labeyrie signed with BC UNICS of the VTB United League.

After starting the 2025–26 season with CB Gran Canaria of the Liga ACB, Labeyrie returned to SIG Strasbourg of the LNB Élite in March 2026.

On August 4, 2026, he signed with Limoges of the French LNB Élite.

=== Draft rights ===
On 26 June 2014, Labeyrie was selected with the 57th overall pick in the 2014 NBA draft by the Indiana Pacers. His draft rights were later traded to the New York Knicks on draft night. On 3 January 2022, New York traded Labeyrie's draft rights to the Los Angeles Lakers, as part of a three-team deal that also included the Cleveland Cavaliers. On 24 June 2026, his draft rights were traded back to New York as part of a five-team deal.

== Career statistics ==
Legend
GP	Games played	GS	Games started	MPG	Minutes per game
FG%	Field-goal percentage	3P%	3-point field-goal percentage	FT%	Free-throw percentage
RPG	Rebounds per game	APG	Assists per game	SPG	Steals per game
BPG	Blocks per game	PPG	Points per game	PIR	Performance index rating
**Bold**	Career high

=== EuroLeague ===
Year	Team	GP	GS	MPG	FG%	3P%	FT%	RPG	APG	SPG	BPG	PPG	PIR
2019–20	Valencia	27	**16**	**20.3**	.495	.324	**.786**	**4.6**	**.7**	**.5**	**.3**	5.1	8.7
2020–21	Valencia	**29**	11	20.2	**.531**	**.360**	.745	3.6	.5	**.5**	**.3**	**7.5**	**9.7**
Career		56	27	20.3	.517	.348	.764	4.1	.6	.5	.3	6.4	9.2
