= 2024–25 Real Madrid Baloncesto season =

Real Madrid
2024–25 season
- President: (Spain) Florentino Pérez
- Head coach: (Spain) Chus Mateo
- Arena: Movistar Arena
- Liga ACB: Winners
- EuroLeague: Playoff series
- Copa del Rey: Runners-up
- Supercopa de España: Runners-up
- Highest home attendance: Liga ACB: 12,050; Real Madrid 73–71 Barcelona (29 December 2024) EuroLeague: 12,130; Real Madrid 96–91 Barcelona (27 February 2025)
- Lowest home attendance: Liga ACB: 5,984; Real Madrid 106–69 Breogán (15 December 2024) EuroLeague: 7,123; Real Madrid 98–84 ALBA Berlin (21 November 2024)
- Average home attendance: Liga ACB: 8,517; EuroLeague: 9,236
- Biggest win: Real Madrid 106–69 Breogán (15 December 2024)
- Biggest defeat: Panathinaikos 85–70 Real Madrid (6 March 2025)
Home	Away

The 2024–25 season was Real Madrid's 94th in existence, their 69th consecutive season in the top flight of Spanish basketball and 18th consecutive season in the EuroLeague.

Times up to 27 October 2024 and from 30 March 2025 are CEST (UTC+2). Times from 27 October 2024 to 30 March 2025 are CET (UTC+1).

== Overview ==
=== Pre-season ===
On 4 April 2024, Rudy Fernández announced his retirement after the 2024 Summer Olympics, leaving Real Madrid at the end of the season after 12 years with the club. On 18 June, another departure followed, as Madrid and Carlos Alocén mutually agreed for the player to put an end to his career at the club. On the next day, Sergio Rodríguez announced his retirement, completing his second stint with Real Madrid and finishing a highly successful career. A week later, the club announced the departure of Vincent Poirier upon expiration of his contract.

On 2 July, Mario Hezonja extended his contract until 2029. The first new signing for Madrid was announced on 3 July, as Andrés Feliz joined from Joventut on a 3-year deal. On 4 July, coach Chus Mateo extended his contract for two more years. On the next day, Edy Tavares renewed until 2029. More renewals followed, as Džanan Musa and captain Sergio Llull agreed to remain in Madrid until 2025. On 12 July, the second new face arrived at the club, as Canadian guard Xavier Rathan-Mayes joined from Yenisey on a 2-year deal.

On 23 July, Fabien Causeur left Real Madrid upon expiration of his contract, putting an end to his 7-year stint at the club. Three days later, Serge Ibaka returned to Madrid on a one-year deal. On 20 August, Usman Garuba signed a three-year deal with the club, returning after three seasons in the NBA.

On 29 August, Real Madrid announced the departure of Guerschon Yabusele after three seasons with the club. Five days later, Alberto Abalde renewed his contract until 2027.

== Players ==
=== Squad information ===
Note: Flags indicate national team eligibility at FIBA-sanctioned events. Players may hold other non-FIBA nationalities not displayed.

Real Madrid roster
Players
Coaches

Pos.	No.	Nat.	Name	Ht.	Wt.	Age
SF	6	(Spain)	Abalde, Alberto	2.02 m (6 ft 8 in)	95 kg (209 lb)	30 – 15 December 1995
PG	7	(Argentina)	Campazzo, Facundo	1.78 m (5 ft 10 in)	84 kg (185 lb)	35 – 23 March 1991
G	8	(Canada)	Rathan-Mayes, Xavier	1.91 m (6 ft 3 in)	94 kg (207 lb)	32 – 29 April 1994
SF	9	(Spain)	González, Hugo (Y)	1.98 m (6 ft 6 in)	93 kg (205 lb)	20 – 5 February 2006
F	11	(Croatia)	Hezonja, Mario	2.06 m (6 ft 9 in)	110 kg (243 lb)	31 – 25 February 1995
G/F	13	(Bosnia and Herzegovina)	Musa, Džanan	2.05 m (6 ft 9 in)	101 kg (223 lb)	27 – 8 May 1999
F	14	(Argentina)	Deck, Gabriel (injured)	1.98 m (6 ft 6 in)	105 kg (231 lb)	31 – 8 February 1995
C	15	(Senegal)	Gueye, Sidi (Y)	2.07 m (6 ft 9 in)	93 kg (205 lb)	18 – 12 October 2007
F/C	16	(Nigeria) (Spain)	Garuba, Usman	2.03 m (6 ft 8 in)	115 kg (254 lb)	24 – 9 March 2002
F/C	18	(Republic of the Congo) (Spain)	Ibaka, Serge	2.10 m (6 ft 11 in)	107 kg (236 lb)	37 – 18 September 1989
C	20	(Angola)	Fernando, Bruno	2.06 m (6 ft 9 in)	109 kg (240 lb)	28 – 15 August 1998
C	22	(Cape Verde)	Tavares, Edy	2.20 m (7 ft 3 in)	125 kg (276 lb)	34 – 22 March 1992
G	23	(Spain)	Llull, Sergio (C)	1.90 m (6 ft 3 in)	94 kg (207 lb)	38 – 15 November 1987
PG	24	(Dominican Republic)	Feliz, Andrés	1.86 m (6 ft 1 in)	92 kg (203 lb)	29 – 15 July 1997
PF	30	(Senegal) (Spain)	Ndiaye, Eli (Y)	2.04 m (6 ft 8 in)	95 kg (209 lb)	22 – 26 June 2004

Head coach

- (Spain) Chus Mateo

Assistant coach(es)

- (Spain) Paco Redondo
- (Spain) Isidoro Calin
- (Spain) Guillermo Frutos

Athletic trainer(s)

- (Spain) Juan Trapero

Legend

- (C) Team captain
- (Y) Youth player
- Injured

- Roster
- Transactions
Updated: April 18, 2025

=== Depth chart ===
Pos.	Starting 5	Bench 1	Bench 2	Bench 3
C	Edy Tavares †	Bruno Fernando	Serge Ibaka †	Sidi Gueye ‡
PF	Mario Hezonja †	Usman Garuba †	Eli Ndiaye ‡
SF	Džanan Musa	Hugo González ‡		Gabriel Deck * (injured)
SG	Alberto Abalde †	Sergio Llull †	Xavier Rathan-Mayes *
PG	Facundo Campazzo	Andrés Feliz

Notes: Blue † – homegrown player; (Note: A homegrown player is a player that played for at least three years before the age of 20 on a Spanish team. In Liga ACB, the team must register at least four homegrown players in rosters of 10–12 players or at least three homegrown players in rosters of 8–9 players. In EuroLeague, the team did not have any limitations regarding the number of homegrown players.) Red * – overseas player; (Note: An overseas player is a player from outside EEA, FIBA Europe or ACP states. In Liga ACB, the team may register at most two overseas players. In EuroLeague, the team did not have any limitations regarding the number of overseas players.) Green ‡ – youth player (Note: In Liga ACB, the team may register under-22 players linked to the youth system. In EuroLeague, the team may register under-20 players linked to the youth system.)

=== Transactions ===
==== In ====
No.	Pos.	Nat.	Name	Age	Moving from		Type	Ends	Transfer fee	Date	Source
4	PG	(United States)	Dennis Smith Jr.	28	Wisconsin Herd	(United States)	Transfer	June 2025	Free	16 January 2025	
8	G	(Canada)	Xavier Rathan-Mayes	32	Yenisey	(Russia)	Transfer	June 2026	Free	12 July 2024	
16	F/C	(Spain)	Usman Garuba	24	Golden State Warriors	(United States)	Transfer	June 2027	Free	20 August 2024	
18	F/C	(Spain)	Serge Ibaka	37	Bayern Munich	(Germany)	Transfer	June 2025	Free	26 July 2024	
20	C	(Angola)	Bruno Fernando	28	Toronto Raptors	(Canada)	Transfer	June 2026	Free	24 January 2025	
24	PG	(Dominican Republic)	Andrés Feliz	29	Joventut	(Spain)	Transfer	June 2027	€500,000	3 July 2024	

==== Out ====
No.	Pos.	Nat.	Name	Age	Moving to		Type	Transfer fee	Date	Source
1	SG	(France)	Fabien Causeur	39	Olimpia Milano	(Italy)	End of contract	Free	23 July 2024	
4	PG	(United States)	Dennis Smith Jr.	28			Released	Free	28 February 2025	
5	G/F	(Spain)	Rudy Fernández	41	Retirement		End of contract	Free	4 April 2024	
12	PG	(Spain)	Carlos Alocén	25	Gran Canaria	(Spain)	End of contract	Free	18 June 2024	
13	PG	(Spain)	Sergio Rodríguez	40	Retirement		End of contract	Free	19 June 2024	
17	C	(France)	Vincent Poirier	32	Anadolu Efes	(Turkey)	End of contract	Free	25 June 2024	
28	PF	(France)	Guerschon Yabusele	30	Philadelphia 76ers	(United States)	Transfer	Undisclosed	29 August 2024	

== Pre-season and friendlies ==
=== Friendly matches ===
7 September 2024 Supercopa Ibérica	Real Madrid (Spanish Basketball Federation)	83–67	(Portuguese Basketball Federation) Benfica	Badajoz
19:30	Scoring by quarter: 23–15, 27–23, 23–12, 10–17
	Pts: Ibaka 18	Report	Pts: Drechsel, Stone 14	Arena: Polideportivo La Granadilla

11 September 2024	Real Madrid (Spanish Basketball Federation)	77–75	(French Federation of Basketball) Monaco	Pontevedra
20:00	Scoring by quarter: 21–17, 14–13, 25–25, 17–20
	Pts: Musa 19	Report	Pts: Okobo 21	Arena: Municipal de Deportes

14 September 2024	Openjobmetis Varese (Italian Basketball Federation)	79–83	(Spanish Basketball Federation) Real Madrid	Mahón
19:30	Scoring by quarter: 22–16, 21–20, 15–20, 21–27
	Pts: Hands 33	Report	Pts: Tavares 18	Arena: Pavelló Menorca

== Competitions ==
=== Overview ===
Competition	First match	Last match	Starting round	Final position	Record							
Competition	First match	Last match	Starting round	Final position	Pld	W	D	L	PF	PA	PD	Win %
Liga ACB	29 September 2024	25 June 2025	Round 1	Winners	43	38		5	3,779	3,375	+404	88.37
EuroLeague	3 October 2024	1 May 2025	Round 1	Playoff series	40	22		18	3,343	3,268	+75	55.00
Copa del Rey	14 February 2025	16 February 2025	Quarter-finals	Runners-up	3	2		1	251	225	+26	66.67
Supercopa de España	21 September 2024	22 September 2024	Semi-finals	Runners-up	2	1		1	169	173	−4	50.00
Total					88	63	0	25	7,542	7,041	+501	71.59

Source: Competitions

=== Liga ACB ===
==== League table ====
Pos	Team	Pld	W	L	PF	PA	PD	Qualification or relegation
1	Real Madrid	34	30	4	2967	2641	+326	Qualification to playoffs
2	Valencia Basket	34	25 (Note: Valencia Basket finished ahead of La Laguna Tenerife on head–to–head record: Valencia Basket 96–81 La Laguna Tenerife, La Laguna Tenerife 99–102 Valencia Basket.)	9	3289	2910	+379	Qualification to playoffs
3	La Laguna Tenerife	34	25	9	2970	2827	+143	Qualification to playoffs
4	Unicaja	34	23	11	3057	2857	+200	Qualification to playoffs
5	Barça	34	21	13	3133	2936	+197	Qualification to playoffs

Source: ACB
Rules for classification: 1) Win–loss record; 2) Head–to–head record; 3) Head–to–head point difference; 4) Point difference; 5) Points scored; 6) Sum of quotients of points scored (Note: Head–to–head record is used only after all the matches between the teams in question have been played)

==== Results summary ====
Overall						Home					Away				
Pld	W	L	PF	PA	PD	W	L	PF	PA	PD	W	L	PF	PA	PD
34	30	4	2967	2641	+326	17	0	1515	1304	+211	13	4	1452	1337	+115

Source: Competitive matches

==== Results by round ====
Round	1	2	3	4	5	6	7	8	9	10	11	12	13	14	15	16	17	18	19	20	21	22	23	24	25	26	27	28	29	30	31	32	33	34
Ground	A	H	A	H	H	A	H	H	A	H	H	A	H	A	A	H	A	H	H	A	A	H	H	A	H	A	A	H	A	H	A	A	H	A
Result	L	W	L	W	W	W	W	W	L	W	W	L	W	W	W	W	W	W	W	W	W	W	W	W	W	W	W	W	W	W	W	W	W	W
Position	10	7	10	6	4	3	3	2	3	3	2	3	3	4	3	3	2	1	1	1	1	1	1	1	1	1	1	1	1	1	1	1	1	1

Source: Competitive matches
A = Away; H = Home; W = Win; L = Loss; R = Rest

==== Matches ====
29 September 2024 1	Leyma Coruña	86–85	Real Madrid	A Coruña
18:30	Scoring by quarter: 16–22, 21–22, 23–19, 26–22
	Pts: Taylor 20; Rebs: Lima 7 Asts: Scrubb, Taylor 4 PIR: Taylor 19	Boxscore	Pts: Campazzo 21; Rebs: Tavares 6 Asts: Rathan-Mayes 4 PIR: Campazzo 24	Arena: Coliseum da Coruña; Attendance: 9,300; Referees: Juan Carlos García González, Alberto Sánchez Sixto, Igor Esteve

6 October 2024 2	Real Madrid	101–95	Casademont Zaragoza	Madrid
12:30	Scoring by quarter: 23–20, 24–26, 28–23, 26–26
	Pts: Deck, Musa 18; Rebs: Musa 7 Asts: Campazzo 8 PIR: Musa 28	Boxscore	Pts: Bell-Haynes 21; Rebs: Sulejmanović 6 Asts: Spissu 5 PIR: Dubljević 24	Arena: WiZink Center; Attendance: 7,937; Referees: Óscar Perea, Francisco Araña, Andrés Fernández

13 October 2024 3	Surne Bilbao Basket	83–79	Real Madrid	Bilbao
12:30	Scoring by quarter: 22–18, 24–16, 14–25, 23–20
	Pts: Kullamäe 18; Rebs: Jones 6 Asts: Kullamäe 4 PIR: Jones, Kullamäe 19	Boxscore	Pts: Deck 23; Rebs: Tavares 8 Asts: Campazzo 8 PIR: Campazzo 29	Arena: Bilbao Arena; Attendance: 9,576; Referees: Emilio Pérez Pizarro, Alfonso Olivares, Cristóbal Sánchez

20 October 2024 4	Real Madrid	95–67	Bàsquet Girona	Madrid
12:30	Scoring by quarter: 23–18, 22–16, 31–15, 19–18
	Pts: three players 14; Rebs: González 6 Asts: Campazzo 5 PIR: Campazzo 22	Boxscore	Pts: Durham 21; Rebs: Iroegbu 5 Asts: Iroegbu 3 PIR: Durham 23	Arena: WiZink Center; Attendance: 7,276; Referees: Fernando Calatrava, Juan de Dios Oyón, Carlos Merino

27 October 2024 5	Real Madrid	86–61	Baxi Manresa	Madrid
12:30	Scoring by quarter: 22–13, 25–8, 16–19, 23–21
	Pts: Hezonja, Rathan-Mayes 14; Rebs: Ibaka 8 Asts: Rathan-Mayes 4 PIR: Tavares 17	Boxscore	Pts: Cățe 10; Rebs: Sagnia 7 Asts: Sagnia 3 PIR: Sagnia 18	Arena: WiZink Center; Attendance: 7,522; Referees: Jordi Aliaga, Jorge Martínez, Roberto Lucas

3 November 2024 6	UCAM Murcia	64–85	Real Madrid	Murcia
18:30	Scoring by quarter: 11–22, 20–18, 17–26, 16–19
	Pts: Ennis 12; Rebs: four players 4 Asts: Håkanson 5 PIR: Ennis 15	Boxscore	Pts: Hezonja 21; Rebs: Tavares 9 Asts: Llull 4 PIR: Hezonja, Tavares 20	Arena: Palacio de Deportes; Attendance: 7,262; Referees: Carlos Peruga, Arnau Padrós, Iyán González

10 November 2024 7	Real Madrid	83–77	Dreamland Gran Canaria	Madrid
12:30	Scoring by quarter: 17–16, 22–20, 20–18, 24–23
	Pts: Campazzo 20; Rebs: Tavares 7 Asts: Campazzo 9 PIR: Campazzo 33	Boxscore	Pts: Brussino 17; Rebs: Pelos 7 Asts: Albicy, Tobey 4 PIR: Albicy 17	Arena: WiZink Center; Attendance: 8,076; Referees: Javier Torres, Alberto Sánchez Sixto, Alberto Baena

17 November 2024 8	Real Madrid	85–78	Hiopos Lleida	Madrid
12:30	Scoring by quarter: 28–13, 23–12, 15–34, 19–19
	Pts: Rathan-Mayes 16; Rebs: Hezonja 7 Asts: Campazzo 5 PIR: Campazzo 19	Boxscore	Pts: Bropleh 18; Rebs: Oriola 9 Asts: Hasbrouck 4 PIR: Oriola 17	Arena: WiZink Center; Attendance: 7,089; Referees: Alfonso Olivares, Sergio Manuel, Yasmina Alcaraz

1 December 2024 9	Joventut	80–76	Real Madrid	Badalona
18:30	Scoring by quarter: 21–23, 19–22, 19–12, 21–19
	Pts: Robertson 18; Rebs: Tomić 9 Asts: Dotson 3 PIR: Tomić 25	Boxscore	Pts: Campazzo 19; Rebs: Tavares 8 Asts: Campazzo 4 PIR: Campazzo 26	Arena: Palau Municipal d'Esports; Attendance: 10,675; Referees: Fernando Calatrava, Vicente Martínez, Roberto Lucas

8 December 2024 10	Real Madrid	90–77	Unicaja	Madrid
18:30	Scoring by quarter: 18–13, 21–21, 21–18, 30–25
	Pts: Deck 24; Rebs: Abalde 7 Asts: Campazzo 7 PIR: Deck 24	Boxscore	Pts: Kravish 16; Rebs: Kravish 8 Asts: Taylor 4 PIR: Kravish 25	Arena: WiZink Center; Attendance: 9,460; Referees: Carlos Peruga, Carlos Cortés, Joaquín García

15 December 2024 11	Real Madrid	106–69	Río Breogán	Madrid
12:30	Scoring by quarter: 19–8, 24–21, 27–19, 36–21
	Pts: Musa 22; Rebs: Deck 9 Asts: Feliz 6 PIR: Deck 27	Boxscore	Pts: Aranitović 13; Rebs: Aranitović, Vila 8 Asts: Hilliard, Nakić 2 PIR: Apić 14	Arena: WiZink Center; Attendance: 5,984; Referees: Luis Miguel Castillo, Esperanza Mendoza, David Sánchez

22 December 2024 12	Valencia Basket	85–84	Real Madrid	Valencia
18:30	Scoring by quarter: 17–9, 23–21, 16–29, 29–25
	Pts: Jones 16; Rebs: Ojeleye 7 Asts: Montero 7 PIR: Jones 19	Boxscore	Pts: Hezonja 20; Rebs: Deck, Tavares 8 Asts: Campazzo 8 PIR: Deck 25	Arena: La Fonteta; Attendance: 7,914; Referees: Óscar Perea, Rafael Serrano, Andrés Fernández

29 December 2024 13	Real Madrid	73–71	Barça	Madrid
20:30	Scoring by quarter: 21–15, 15–16, 21–20, 16–20
	Pts: Campazzo 17; Rebs: Hezonja 11; Asts: Campazzo 6 PIR: Hezonja 24	Boxscore	Pts: Parker 18; Rebs: Parker 9 Asts: Veselý 5 PIR: Satoranský 22	Arena: WiZink Center; Attendance: 12,050; Referees: Antonio Conde, Fernando Calatrava, Roberto Lucas

6 January 2025 15	Baskonia	82–89	Real Madrid	Vitoria-Gasteiz
20:30	Scoring by quarter: 18–28, 21–19, 17–16, 26–26
	Pts: Šamanić 15; Rebs: Diop 8 Asts: Forrest 7 PIR: Rogkavopoulos 16	Boxscore	Pts: Musa 29; Rebs: Tavares 8 Asts: Campazzo 6 PIR: Musa 38	Arena: Buesa Arena; Attendance: 12,453; Referees: Emilio Pérez Pizarro, Javier Torres, Vicente Martínez

8 January 2025 14	Covirán Granada	79–84	Real Madrid	Granada
20:30	Scoring by quarter: 25–18, 23–20, 16–18, 15–28
	Pts: Noua 18; Rebs: Noua 7 Asts: García 7 PIR: Noua 22	Boxscore	Pts: Hezonja 23; Rebs: Tavares 10; Asts: Campazzo 6 PIR: Hezonja 24	Arena: Palacio de Deportes; Attendance: 7,969; Referees: Carlos Peruga, Alberto Baena, Fabio Fernández

12 January 2025 16	Real Madrid	96–86	La Laguna Tenerife	Madrid
17:00	Scoring by quarter: 15–20, 30–22, 34–16, 17–28
	Pts: Hezonja 16; Rebs: Tavares 7 Asts: Rathan-Mayes 7 PIR: Hezonja 24	Boxscore	Pts: Krämer 22; Rebs: Scrubb 5 Asts: Huertas 11; PIR: Krämer 21	Arena: Movistar Arena; Attendance: 8,727; Referees: Óscar Perea, Arnau Padrós, Guillermo Ríos

19 January 2025 17	MoraBanc Andorra	84–100	Real Madrid	Andorra la Vella
18:30	Scoring by quarter: 24–22, 17–34, 18–21, 25–23
	Pts: Harding 24; Rebs: Doumbouya 8 Asts: Bassas 5 PIR: Harding 27	Boxscore	Pts: Musa 19; Rebs: Garuba 7 Asts: Llull 5 PIR: Musa 23	Arena: Pavelló Toni Martí; Attendance: 4,376; Referees: Jordi Aliaga, Carlos Cortés, Joaquín García

26 January 2025 18	Real Madrid	90–74	Leyma Coruña	Madrid
17:00	Scoring by quarter: 29–12, 17–18, 23–21, 21–23
	Pts: Ibaka 18; Rebs: four players 5 Asts: Campazzo, Feliz 4 PIR: Ibaka 25	Boxscore	Pts: Jakovičs 14; Rebs: Burjanadze 7 Asts: Scrubb, Huskić 5 PIR: Scrubb 19	Arena: Movistar Arena; Attendance: 7,320; Referees: Juan Carlos García González, Iyán González, Cristóbal Sánchez

2 February 2025 19	Real Madrid	86–73	Joventut	Madrid
18:30	Scoring by quarter: 22–20, 18–19, 18–19, 28–15
	Pts: Musa 21; Rebs: Tavares 9 Asts: three players 3 PIR: Musa 25	Boxscore	Pts: Tomić, Robertson 13; Rebs: Tomić 6 Asts: Robertson 3 PIR: Tomić 18	Arena: Movistar Arena; Attendance: 8,294; Referees: Emilio Pérez Pizarro, Andrés Fernández, Igor Esteve

9 February 2025 20	Hiopos Lleida	84–95	Real Madrid	Lleida
12:30	Scoring by quarter: 21–28, 16–18, 28–20, 19–29
	Pts: Božić, van der Vuurst 12; Rebs: Božić 6 Asts: van der Vuurst 9 PIR: Božić 19	Boxscore	Pts: Hezonja 22; Rebs: Hezonja 12; Asts: Llull 8 PIR: Hezonja 33	Arena: Espai Fruita Barris Nord; Attendance: 6,016; Referees: Antonio Conde, Luis Miguel Castillo, Guillermo Ríos

2 March 2025 21	Dreamland Gran Canaria	54–69	Real Madrid	Las Palmas
18:30	Scoring by quarter: 9–12, 9–19, 22–17, 14–21
	Pts: Brussino 14; Rebs: Tobey 7 Asts: Thomasson 4 PIR: Thomasson 16	Boxscore	Pts: Hezonja 14; Rebs: Hezonja 8 Asts: Campazzo 4 PIR: Fernando 20	Arena: Gran Canaria Arena; Attendance: 8,058; Referees: Juan Carlos García González, Carlos Cortés, Alberto Baena

9 March 2025 22	Real Madrid	80–75	UCAM Murcia	Madrid
12:30	Scoring by quarter: 23–28, 14–15, 21–16, 22–16
	Pts: Musa 15; Rebs: Garuba 9 Asts: Campazzo 5 PIR: Tavares 21	Boxscore	Pts: Kurucs, Stephens 15; Rebs: Kurucs 11; Asts: Håkanson 6 PIR: Kurucs 19	Arena: Movistar Arena; Attendance: 8,564; Referees: Rafael Serrano, Iyán González, Cristóbal Sánchez

16 March 2025 23	Real Madrid	83–78	Baskonia	Madrid
18:30	Scoring by quarter: 21–20, 18–20, 17–13, 27–25
	Pts: Abalde, Hezonja 16; Rebs: Hezonja 10; Asts: Campazzo 4 PIR: Hezonja 22	Boxscore	Pts: Howard 15; Rebs: Luwawu-Cabarrot 8 Asts: Forrest 5 PIR: Hall 24	Arena: Movistar Arena; Attendance: 9,078; Referees: Martín Caballero, Arnau Padrós, Rubén Sánchez Mohedas

23 March 2025 24	Unicaja	105–107	Real Madrid	Málaga
18:30	Scoring by quarter: 21–25, 27–21, 30–22, 27–39
	Pts: Carter 24; Rebs: Kravish 5 Asts: Perry, Díaz 5 PIR: Carter 21	Boxscore	Pts: Musa 24; Rebs: Tavares 10; Asts: Musa 6 PIR: Musa 37	Arena: Martín Carpena; Attendance: 10,681; Referees: Antonio Conde, Jorge Martínez, Javier Torres

30 March 2025 25	Real Madrid	88–70	Surne Bilbao Basket	Madrid
17:00	Scoring by quarter: 22–17, 12–17, 29–18, 25–18
	Pts: Ibaka 19; Rebs: Tavares 8 Asts: Campazzo, Feliz 4 PIR: Tavares 27	Boxscore	Pts: Sylla 13; Rebs: Sylla 6 Asts: Kullamäe 4 PIR: Sylla 15	Arena: Movistar Arena; Attendance: 7,853; Referees: Juan Carlos García González, Esperanza Mendoza, Carlos Merino

6 April 2025 26	Barça	89–91	Real Madrid	Barcelona
18:30	Scoring by quarter: 24–20, 15–22, 22–26, 28–23
	Pts: Punter 19; Rebs: Anderson 7 Asts: Brizuela, Punter 3 PIR: Parra 20	Boxscore	Pts: Llull 19; Rebs: Tavares 10; Asts: Musa 6 PIR: Tavares 25	Arena: Palau Blaugrana; Attendance: 7,334; Referees: Carlos Peruga, Carlos Cortés, Sergio Manuel

13 April 2025 27	La Laguna Tenerife	68–79	Real Madrid	San Cristóbal de La Laguna
13:00	Scoring by quarter: 15–23, 19–22, 15–21, 19–13
	Pts: Abromaitis 15; Rebs: Doornekamp, Krämer 4 Asts: Fernández 5 PIR: Abromaitis 15	Boxscore	Pts: Hezonja 16; Rebs: Fernando 10; Asts: Campazzo 5 PIR: Fernando 17	Arena: Santiago Martín; Attendance: 5,146; Referees: Emilio Pérez Pizarro, Arnau Padrós, Juan de Dios Oyón

20 April 2025 28	Real Madrid	98–97	MoraBanc Andorra	Madrid
12:30	Scoring by quarter: 29–29, 17–15, 30–25, 22–28
	Pts: Musa 21; Rebs: Ibaka 7 Asts: Campazzo, Garuba 3 PIR: Musa 24	Boxscore	Pts: Evans 31; Rebs: dos Anjos 10; Asts: three players 4 PIR: Evans 31	Arena: Movistar Arena; Attendance: 7,455; Referees: Óscar Perea, Luis Miguel Castillo, Igor Esteve

27 April 2025 29	Bàsquet Girona	71–79	Real Madrid	Girona
12:30	Scoring by quarter: 21–15, 8–19, 24–27, 18–18
	Pts: Pons, Marcos 11; Rebs: Geben 9 Asts: Iroegbu 5 PIR: Geben 18	Boxscore	Pts: Musa 22; Rebs: Tavares 8 Asts: Campazzo 7 PIR: Campazzo 20	Arena: Fontajau; Attendance: 5,198; Referees: Jordi Aliaga, Jorge Martínez, Raúl Zamorano

4 May 2025 30	Real Madrid	96–89	Valencia Basket	Madrid
18:30	Scoring by quarter: 27–20, 19–24, 28–19, 22–26
	Pts: Feliz 20; Rebs: Ndiaye, Tavares 8 Asts: Feliz 4 PIR: Feliz 26	Boxscore	Pts: Reuvers 13; Rebs: Costello 6 Asts: Montero 9 PIR: Montero, Pradilla 17	Arena: Movistar Arena; Attendance: 7,433; Referees: Carlos Peruga, Alberto Sánchez Sixto, Fabio Fernández

11 May 2025 31	Río Breogán	69–79	Real Madrid	Lugo
18:30	Scoring by quarter: 13–24, 14–10, 27–25, 15–20
	Pts: Grant 24; Rebs: four players 5 Asts: Grant 5 PIR: Grant 26	Boxscore	Pts: Musa 15; Rebs: Fernando 8 Asts: Llull 4 PIR: Fernando 25	Arena: Pazo dos Deportes; Attendance: 5,310; Referees: Alfonso Olivares, Luis Miguel Castillo, Yasmina Alcaraz

18 May 2025 32	Baxi Manresa	65–67	Real Madrid	Manresa
12:30	Scoring by quarter: 10–21, 16–18, 20–14, 19–14
	Pts: Alston 19; Rebs: Cățe 8 Asts: Hunt 5 PIR: Jou 10	Boxscore	Pts: Tavares 14; Rebs: Fernando 12; Asts: Llull 3 PIR: Tavares 15	Arena: Nou Congost; Attendance: 5,000; Referees: Martín Caballero, Francisco Araña, Roberto Lucas

25 May 2025 33	Real Madrid	79–67	Covirán Granada	Madrid
17:00	Scoring by quarter: 18–9, 18–18, 21–23, 22–17
	Pts: Hezonja 21; Rebs: Tavares 10; Asts: Campazzo 6 PIR: Tavares 22	Boxscore	Pts: Noua 19; Rebs: Noua, Valtonen 7 Asts: Rousselle 5 PIR: García 15	Arena: Movistar Arena; Attendance: 6,712; Referees: Antonio Conde, Sergio Manuel, Raúl Zamorano

30 May 2025 34	Casademont Zaragoza	89–104	Real Madrid	Zaragoza
18:30	Scoring by quarter: 23–28, 17–32, 28–20, 21–24
	Pts: Sulejmanović 20; Rebs: Sulejmanović 6 Asts: Spissu 8 PIR: Yusta 21	Boxscore	Pts: Hezonja 23; Rebs: Fernando 7 Asts: Campazzo 7 PIR: Hezonja 24	Arena: Pabellón Príncipe Felipe; Attendance: 6,298; Referees: Juan Carlos García González, Juan de Dios Oyón, Igor Esteve

=== ACB Playoffs ===
==== Quarterfinals ====
3 June 2025 1	Real Madrid	82–76	Baskonia	Madrid
19:00	Scoring by quarter: 15–14, 22–24, 22–13, 23–25
	Pts: Tavares 16; Rebs: Tavares 13; Asts: Llull 6 PIR: Tavares 35	Boxscore	Pts: Howard 17; Rebs: Hall 6 Asts: Forrest 6 PIR: Howard 18	Arena: Movistar Arena; Attendance: 9,067; Referees: Carlos Peruga, Carlos Cortés, Vicente Martínez

6 June 2025 2	Baskonia	103–112	Real Madrid	Vitoria-Gasteiz
21:15	Scoring by quarter: 33–27, 23–27, 25–34, 22–24
	Pts: Forrest 30; Rebs: Moneke 6 Asts: Forrest 7 PIR: Forrest 33	Boxscore	Pts: Llull 19; Rebs: Fernando, Tavares 10; Asts: Campazzo 6 PIR: Tavares 22	Arena: Buesa Arena; Attendance: 12,154; Referees: Antonio Conde, Arnau Padrós, Alberto Baena

==== Semifinals ====
11 June 2025 1	Real Madrid	99–81	Unicaja	Madrid
21:15	Scoring by quarter: 29–14, 22–17, 24–22, 24–28
	Pts: Musa 23; Rebs: Feliz 6 Asts: Campazzo 7 PIR: Musa 27	Boxscore	Pts: Ejim 13; Rebs: Pérez, Carter 5 Asts: Díaz 6 PIR: Ejim 15	Arena: Movistar Arena; Attendance: 10,089; Referees: Emilio Pérez Pizarro, Óscar Perea, Francisco Araña

13 June 2025 2	Real Madrid	90–75	Unicaja	Madrid
21:15	Scoring by quarter: 23–19, 23–22, 21–17, 23–17
	Pts: Campazzo, Hezonja 18; Rebs: Hezonja 6 Asts: Campazzo 4 PIR: Llull, Campazzo 19	Boxscore	Pts: Perry 16; Rebs: Pérez, Barreiro 6 Asts: three players 3 PIR: Pérez 18	Arena: Movistar Arena; Attendance: 10,174; Referees: Antonio Conde, Fernando Calatrava, Martín Caballero

15 June 2025 3	Unicaja	86–84	Real Madrid	Málaga
21:15	Scoring by quarter: 23–13, 25–21, 22–26, 16–24
	Pts: Osetkowski 21; Rebs: Osetkowski 6 Asts: Díaz 6 PIR: Osetkowski 17	Boxscore	Pts: Hezonja 18; Rebs: Tavares 7 Asts: Feliz 5 PIR: Hezonja 20	Arena: Martín Carpena; Attendance: 10,681; Referees: Carlos Peruga, Carlos Cortés, Alfonso Olivares

17 June 2025 4	Unicaja	79–86	Real Madrid	Málaga
21:15	Scoring by quarter: 22–16, 21–23, 20–22, 16–25
	Pts: Carter 17; Rebs: Osetkowski, Taylor 5 Asts: Díaz 4 PIR: Ejim 14	Boxscore	Pts: Hezonja 20; Rebs: Tavares 12; Asts: Campazzo 6 PIR: Campazzo, Tavares 24	Arena: Martín Carpena; Attendance: 10,681; Referees: Emilio Pérez Pizarro, Óscar Perea, Jordi Aliaga

==== Finals ====
20 June 2024 1	Real Madrid	89–75	Valencia Basket	Madrid
21:15	Scoring by quarter: 19–15, 16–17, 29–28, 25–15
	Pts: Feliz 18; Rebs: Fernando 7 Asts: Feliz 3 PIR: Feliz 22	Boxscore	Pts: Badio 20; Rebs: Pradilla 8 Asts: Jones 5 PIR: Badio 15	Arena: Movistar Arena; Attendance: 10,064; Referees: Antonio Conde, Carlos Cortés, Arnau Padrós

22 June 2024 2	Real Madrid	102–96(OT)	Valencia Basket	Madrid
18:30	Scoring by quarter: 22–25, 26–20, 21–23, 20–21, Overtime: 13–7
	Pts: Campazzo 18; Rebs: Tavares 10; Asts: Campazzo 11; PIR: Campazzo 19	Boxscore	Pts: Montero 23; Rebs: Pradilla 8 Asts: Montero 8 PIR: Montero 26	Arena: Movistar Arena; Attendance: 11,142; Referees: Emilio Pérez Pizarro, Óscar Perea, Francisco Araña

25 June 2024 3	Valencia Basket	70–81	Real Madrid	Valencia
21:15	Scoring by quarter: 19–23, 21–16, 9–21, 21–21
	Pts: López-Arostegui 14; Rebs: Sestina 8 Asts: Jones 3 PIR: López-Arostegui 16	Boxscore	Pts: Hezonja 16; Rebs: Hezonja 9 Asts: Campazzo 8 PIR: Fernando 21	Arena: La Fonteta; Attendance: 8,081; Referees: Carlos Peruga, Jordi Aliaga, Alberto Sánchez Sixto

=== EuroLeague ===
==== League table ====
Pos	Team	Pld	W	L	PF	PA	PD	Qualification
5	(Spanish Basketball Federation) Barcelona	34	20	14	2966	2837	+129	Qualification to playoffs
6	(Turkish Basketball Federation) Anadolu Efes	34	20	14	2941	2788	+153	Qualification to playoffs
7	(Spanish Basketball Federation) Real Madrid	34	20	14	2870	2797	+73	Qualification to play-in
8	(French Federation of Basketball) Paris Basketball	34	19	15	2940	2910	+30	Qualification to play-in
9	(German Basketball Federation) Bayern Munich	34	19	15	2965	2984	−19	Qualification to play-in

Source: EuroLeague
Rules for classification: Regular season tiebreakers

==== Results summary ====
Overall						Home					Away				
Pld	W	L	PF	PA	PD	W	L	PF	PA	PD	W	L	PF	PA	PD
34	20	14	2870	2797	+73	13	4	1543	1462	+81	7	10	1327	1335	−8

Last updated: 10 April 2025.
Source: Competitive matches

==== Results by round ====
Round	1	2	3	4	5	6	7	8	9	10	11	12	13	14	15	16	17	18	19	20	21	22	23	24	25	26	27	28	29	30	31	32	33	34
Ground	A	H	A	H	H	A	A	A	H	H	H	A	A	H	H	A	H	A	H	A	H	H	H	A	A	A	H	A	A	H	H	A	H	A
Result	L	W	L	W	W	L	L	L	W	L	W	W	L	L	L	W	W	W	W	W	W	L	W	L	L	L	W	L	W	W	W	W	W	W
Position	14	9	13	10	3	9	11	12	11	11	10	10	12	13	13	13	12	10	8	7	7	8	6	8	10	11	10	12	12	10	9	8	6	7

Source: Competitive matches
A = Away; H = Home; W = Win; L = Loss; P = Postponed

==== Matches ====
3 October 2024 1	Bayern Munich (German Basketball Federation)	97–89	(Spanish Basketball Federation) Real Madrid	Munich
20:45	Scoring by quarter: 26–29, 26–22, 12–22, 33–16
	Pts: Napier 25; Rebs: Voigtmann 10; Asts: Edwards 6 PIR: Napier, Voigtmann 23	Boxscore	Pts: Campazzo 19; Rebs: Tavares 9 Asts: Campazzo 9 PIR: Campazzo 21	Arena: SAP Garden; Attendance: 10,088; Referees: Mehdi Difallah, Saulius Račys, Sašo Petek

10 October 2024 2	Real Madrid (Spanish Basketball Federation)	93–86	(Basketball Federation of Serbia) Partizan Mozzart Bet	Madrid
20:45	Scoring by quarter: 24–24, 26–23, 18–17, 25–22
	Pts: Ibaka 15; Rebs: Ibaka 7 Asts: Campazzo 11; PIR: Campazzo 22	Boxscore	Pts: C. Jones 15; Rebs: Davies 5 Asts: Bonga 6 PIR: C. Jones, T. Jones 16	Arena: WiZink Center; Attendance: 8,623; Referees: Emin Moğulkoç, Milan Nedović, Tomasz Trawicki

15 October 2024 3	Baskonia (Spanish Basketball Federation)	76–72	(Spanish Basketball Federation) Real Madrid	Vitoria-Gasteiz
20:30	Scoring by quarter: 16–18, 20–17, 12–17, 28–20
	Pts: Howard 15; Rebs: Sedekerskis 8 Asts: Sedekerskis 5 PIR: Moneke 21	Boxscore	Pts: Musa 17; Rebs: Tavares 15; Asts: Llull 7 PIR: Tavares 29	Arena: Buesa Arena; Attendance: 11,044; Referees: Saša Pukl, Artūras Šukys, Sérgio Silva

17 October 2024 4	Real Madrid (Spanish Basketball Federation)	90–86	(Hellenic Basketball Federation) Panathinaikos AKTOR	Madrid
20:45	Scoring by quarter: 28–19, 15–19, 27–20, 20–28
	Pts: Campazzo 19; Rebs: Ndiaye, Tavares 6 Asts: Campazzo 6 PIR: Campazzo 28	Boxscore	Pts: Nunn 23; Rebs: Lessort 7 Asts: Nunn 6 PIR: Nunn 25	Arena: WiZink Center; Attendance: 10,175; Referees: Sreten Radović, Gytis Vilius, Kristaps Konstantinovs

24 October 2024 5	Real Madrid (Spanish Basketball Federation)	95–72	(Basketball Federation of Serbia) Crvena zvezda Meridianbet	Madrid
20:45	Scoring by quarter: 22–10, 24–19, 25–25, 24–18
	Pts: Musa 17; Rebs: three players 6 Asts: Hezonja, Campazzo 6 PIR: Campazzo 30	Boxscore	Pts: Teodosić 11; Rebs: Davidovac 7 Asts: Teodosić 4 PIR: Teodosić, Kalinić 12	Arena: WiZink Center; Attendance: 8,387; Referees: Mehdi Difallah, Rain Peerandi, Hugues Thépénier

29 October 2024 6	Olympiacos (Hellenic Basketball Federation)	79–69	(Spanish Basketball Federation) Real Madrid	Piraeus
20:15	Scoring by quarter: 17–21, 19–13, 20–25, 23–10
	Pts: Vezenkov 23; Rebs: McKissic 9 Asts: Fall 6 PIR: Vezenkov 25	Boxscore	Pts: Hezonja 15; Rebs: Tavares 6 Asts: Campazzo 10; PIR: Hezonja 17	Arena: Peace and Friendship Stadium; Attendance: 12,349; Referees: Damir Javor, Milivoje Jovčić, Milan Nedović

31 October 2024 7	Maccabi Playtika Tel Aviv (Israeli Basketball Association)	79–78	(Spanish Basketball Federation) Real Madrid	Belgrade (Note: Since 24 October 2023, Maccabi Playtika Tel Aviv play their home matches in Belgrade due to the inability to host matches in Israel as a result of the Gaza war until further notice.)
20:05	Scoring by quarter: 21–23, 15–20, 19–21, 24–14
	Pts: Lee 19; Rebs: Rayman 14; Asts: Jokubaitis 7 PIR: Hoard 17	Boxscore	Pts: Hezonja 18; Rebs: Tavares 7 Asts: Campazzo 7 PIR: Campazzo 22	Arena: Aleksandar Nikolić Hall; Attendance: 0 Referees: Tomislav Hordov, Saulius Račys, Nick Van den Broeck

7 November 2024 8	EA7 Emporio Armani Milan (Italian Basketball Federation)	85–76	(Spanish Basketball Federation) Real Madrid	Assago
20:30	Scoring by quarter: 24–16, 23–24, 15–15, 23–21
	Pts: Dimitrijević 22; Rebs: LeDay 8 Asts: Mannion 5 PIR: LeDay 23	Boxscore	Pts: Ibaka, Hezonja 15; Rebs: Tavares 9 Asts: Llull 4 PIR: Ibaka, Deck 15	Arena: Unipol Forum; Attendance: 9,309; Referees: Saša Pukl, Gytis Vilius, Uroš Obrknežević

12 November 2024 9	Real Madrid (Spanish Basketball Federation)	98–86	(Italian Basketball Federation) Virtus Segafredo Bologna	Madrid
20:45	Scoring by quarter: 28–25, 25–24, 27–18, 18–19
	Pts: Hezonja 20; Rebs: Ibaka, Deck 6 Asts: Campazzo 9 PIR: Campazzo 27	Boxscore	Pts: Shengelia 20; Rebs: Žižić 7 Asts: Cordinier 7 PIR: Cordinier 25	Arena: WiZink Center; Attendance: 7,549; Referees: Piotr Pastusiak, Luka Kardum, Mario Majkić

14 November 2024 10	Real Madrid (Spanish Basketball Federation)	64–74	(Turkish Basketball Federation) Anadolu Efes	Madrid
20:45	Scoring by quarter: 6–19, 19–28, 24–11, 15–16
	Pts: Campazzo 20; Rebs: Tavares 13; Asts: Campazzo 4 PIR: Campazzo 24	Boxscore	Pts: Bryant 13; Rebs: Poirier 6 Asts: Beaubois 4 PIR: Šmits 14	Arena: WiZink Center; Attendance: 8,434; Referees: Robert Lottermoser, Uroš Nikolić, Eduard Udyanskyy

21 November 2024 11	Real Madrid (Spanish Basketball Federation)	98–84	(German Basketball Federation) ALBA Berlin	Madrid
20:45	Scoring by quarter: 23–22, 32–33, 24–13, 19–16
	Pts: Rathan-Mayes 16; Rebs: Hezonja 8 Asts: Campazzo 10; PIR: Campazzo 25	Boxscore	Pts: Procida 18; Rebs: Delow 7 Asts: Samar 8 PIR: Procida 17	Arena: WiZink Center; Attendance: 7,123; Referees: Joseph Bissang, Seffi Shemmesh, Denis Hadžić

28 November 2024 12	Barcelona (Spanish Basketball Federation)	90–97(OT)	(Spanish Basketball Federation) Real Madrid	Barcelona
20:45	Scoring by quarter: 17–22, 21–12, 14–20, 22–20, Overtime: 10–10, 6–13
	Pts: Punter 27; Rebs: Veselý 8 Asts: Brizuela, Punter 4 PIR: Veselý 26	Boxscore	Pts: Tavares 24; Rebs: Tavares 18; Asts: Campazzo 10; PIR: Tavares 39	Arena: Palau Blaugrana; Attendance: 7,572; Referees: Saša Pukl, Piotr Pastusiak, Saulius Račys

3 December 2024 13	LDLC ASVEL (French Federation of Basketball)	80–78	(Spanish Basketball Federation) Real Madrid	Décines-Charpieu
20:00	Scoring by quarter: 30–26, 21–17, 8–23, 21–12
	Pts: Maledon 23; Rebs: Roberson 7 Asts: Maledon 7 PIR: Maledon 31	Boxscore	Pts: Hezonja 19; Rebs: Tavares 8 Asts: Campazzo 12; PIR: Campazzo, Tavares 19	Arena: LDLC Arena; Attendance: 8,995; Referees: Borys Ryzhyk, Ioannis Foufis, Vassilis Pitsilkas

5 December 2024 14	Real Madrid (Spanish Basketball Federation)	70–82	(Turkish Basketball Federation) Fenerbahçe Beko	Madrid
20:45	Scoring by quarter: 20–12, 11–25, 16–23, 23–22
	Pts: Campazzo 14; Rebs: Tavares 7 Asts: Campazzo 6 PIR: Campazzo 19	Boxscore	Pts: Hayes-Davis 33; Rebs: Birch 7 Asts: Baldwin 5 PIR: Hayes-Davis 30	Arena: WiZink Center; Attendance: 9,633; Referees: Robert Lottermoser, Igor Dragojević, Maxime Boubert

12 December 2024 15	Real Madrid (Spanish Basketball Federation)	83–92	(Lithuanian Basketball Federation) Žalgiris	Madrid
20:45	Scoring by quarter: 19–24, 19–30, 22–18, 23–20
	Pts: Musa 15; Rebs: Hezonja 8 Asts: Campazzo 5 PIR: Hezonja 22	Boxscore	Pts: Walker 21; Rebs: Francisco 5 Asts: Francisco 4 PIR: Francisco 22	Arena: WiZink Center; Attendance: 7,842; Referees: Damir Javor, Miloš Koljenšić, Luka Kardum

17 December 2024 16	Paris Basketball (French Federation of Basketball)	85–96	(Spanish Basketball Federation) Real Madrid	Paris
20:30	Scoring by quarter: 17–26, 31–26, 19–18, 18–26
	Pts: Lô 30; Rebs: three players 5 Asts: Lô 7 PIR: Lô 35	Boxscore	Pts: Campazzo 19; Rebs: Tavares 14; Asts: Campazzo 6 PIR: Campazzo 28	Arena: Adidas Arena; Attendance: 6,694; Referees: Saša Pukl, Milivoje Jovčić, Anne Panther

19 December 2024 17	Real Madrid (Spanish Basketball Federation)	94–72	(French Federation of Basketball) Monaco	Madrid
20:45	Scoring by quarter: 29–22, 24–13, 24–12, 17–25
	Pts: Musa 22; Rebs: Garuba 6 Asts: Musa 5 PIR: Musa 26	Boxscore	Pts: James 19; Rebs: James, Korkmaz 4 Asts: James 8 PIR: James 22	Arena: WiZink Center; Attendance: 7,886; Referees: Tomislav Hordov, Rain Peerandi, Michele Rossi

26 December 2024 18	ALBA Berlin (German Basketball Federation)	69–80	(Spanish Basketball Federation) Real Madrid	Berlin
19:00	Scoring by quarter: 15–28, 19–17, 17–16, 18–19
	Pts: McCormack 15; Rebs: McCormack 8 Asts: Hermannsson 8 PIR: McCormack 21	Boxscore	Pts: Llull 20; Rebs: Tavares 10; Asts: Campazzo 9 PIR: Hezonja 21	Arena: Uber Arena; Attendance: 9,765; Referees: Ilija Belošević, Borys Ryzhyk, Tomasz Trawicki

3 January 2025 19	Real Madrid (Spanish Basketball Federation)	88–76	(German Basketball Federation) Bayern Munich	Madrid
21:00	Scoring by quarter: 23–16, 24–14, 15–20, 26–26
	Pts: Musa 15; Rebs: Tavares 10; Asts: Campazzo 5 PIR: Hezonja 18	Boxscore	Pts: Edwards 18; Rebs: Booker, da Silva 4 Asts: Booker, Napier 3 PIR: Edwards, Napier 14	Arena: Movistar Arena; Attendance: 9,789; Referees: Damir Javor, Oļegs Latiševs, Maxime Boubert

10 January 2025 20	Žalgiris (Lithuanian Basketball Federation)	64–83	(Spanish Basketball Federation) Real Madrid	Kaunas
19:00	Scoring by quarter: 26–15, 8–20, 12–20, 18–28
	Pts: Walker 17; Rebs: Smailagić, Walker 5 Asts: Giedraitis 4 PIR: Walker 15	Boxscore	Pts: Musa 17; Rebs: Abalde, Ndiaye 7 Asts: Campazzo, Rathan-Mayes 4 PIR: Musa 18	Arena: Žalgirio Arena; Attendance: 15,034; Referees: Sreten Radović, Seffi Shemmesh, Hüseyin Çelik

14 January 2025 21	Real Madrid (Spanish Basketball Federation)	116–113	(Israeli Basketball Association) Maccabi Playtika Tel Aviv	Madrid
20:45	Scoring by quarter: 33–30, 24–33, 34–27, 25–23
	Pts: Campazzo 31; Rebs: Garuba 6 Asts: Campazzo 8 PIR: Campazzo 43	Boxscore	Pts: Jokubaitis 20; Rebs: Jokubaitis 7 Asts: Blatt 8 PIR: Jokubaitis 27	Arena: Movistar Arena; Attendance: 8,163; Referees: Tomislav Hordov, Uroš Nikolić, Vasiliki Tsaroucha

16 January 2025 22	Real Madrid (Spanish Basketball Federation)	86–96	(Hellenic Basketball Federation) Olympiacos	Madrid
20:45	Scoring by quarter: 19–22, 19–25, 16–26, 32–23
	Pts: Hezonja 17; Rebs: Tavares 8 Asts: Campazzo 4 PIR: Tavares 19	Boxscore	Pts: Fournier 28; Rebs: Vezenkov 9 Asts: Vildoza 5 PIR: Fournier 25	Arena: Movistar Arena; Attendance: 10,045; Referees: Saša Pukl, Carmelo Paternicò, Luka Kardum

23 January 2025 23	Real Madrid (Spanish Basketball Federation)	90–89	(Spanish Basketball Federation) Baskonia	Madrid
20:45	Scoring by quarter: 22–21, 20–24, 22–22, 26–22
	Pts: Hezonja, Campazzo 22; Rebs: Tavares 9 Asts: Campazzo 6 PIR: Campazzo 29	Boxscore	Pts: Rogkavopoulos 22; Rebs: Rogkavopoulos 11; Asts: Moneke 5 PIR: Moneke 28	Arena: Movistar Arena; Attendance: 9,182; Referees: Ilija Belošević, Milan Nedović, Rain Peerandi

31 January 2025 24	Monaco (French Federation of Basketball)	77–73	(Spanish Basketball Federation) Real Madrid	Fontvieille
19:00	Scoring by quarter: 20–13, 16–26, 23–17, 18–17
	Pts: Strazel 13; Rebs: Blossomgame, Diallo 6 Asts: Calathes 10; PIR: Calathes 17	Boxscore	Pts: Hezonja 15; Rebs: Hezonja 8 Asts: Campazzo 5 PIR: Hezonja 16	Arena: Salle Gaston Médecin; Attendance: 3,157; Referees: Robert Lottermoser, Piotr Pastusiak, Anne Panther

4 February 2025 25	Anadolu Efes (Turkish Basketball Federation)	79–73	(Spanish Basketball Federation) Real Madrid	Istanbul
18:30	Scoring by quarter: 25–17, 13–21, 18–23, 23–12
	Pts: Bryant 21; Rebs: Poirier 8 Asts: Thompson 5 PIR: Bryant 24	Boxscore	Pts: Hezonja 18; Rebs: three players 5 Asts: Campazzo 10; PIR: Fernando 14	Arena: Basketball Development Center; Attendance: 9,967; Referees: Tomislav Hordov, Gytis Vilius, Maxime Boubert

6 February 2025 26	Fenerbahçe Beko (Turkish Basketball Federation)	78–67	(Spanish Basketball Federation) Real Madrid	Istanbul
18:30	Scoring by quarter: 16–16, 24–12, 18–19, 20–20
	Pts: Hayes-Davis 20; Rebs: Hayes-Davis 7 Asts: Hall 6 PIR: Hayes-Davis 23	Boxscore	Pts: Campazzo 11; Rebs: Abalde 6 Asts: Campazzo 3 PIR: three players 12	Arena: Ülker Sports and Event Hall; Attendance: 12,578; Referees: Mehdi Difallah, Oļegs Latiševs, Guido Giovannetti

27 February 2025 27	Real Madrid (Spanish Basketball Federation)	96–91	(Spanish Basketball Federation) Barcelona	Madrid
20:45	Scoring by quarter: 23–25, 17–18, 30–24, 26–24
	Pts: Hezonja 19; Rebs: Hezonja 8 Asts: Abalde 5 PIR: Musa 24	Boxscore	Pts: Parra 20; Rebs: Parra, Anderson 7 Asts: Satoranský 4 PIR: Anderson 26	Arena: Movistar Arena; Attendance: 12,130; Referees: Ilija Belošević, Borys Ryzhyk, Miloš Koljenšić

6 March 2025 28	Panathinaikos AKTOR (Hellenic Basketball Federation)	85–70	(Spanish Basketball Federation) Real Madrid	Marousi
20:45	Scoring by quarter: 24–13, 16–20, 23–20, 22–17
	Pts: Nunn 18; Rebs: Mitoglou 9 Asts: Grant 9 PIR: Grant 21	Boxscore	Pts: Hezonja 18; Rebs: Hezonja 8 Asts: Campazzo 6 PIR: Tavares 20	Arena: OAKA Altion; Attendance: 18,940; Referees: Sreten Radović, Emin Moğulkoç, Milan Nedović

13 March 2025 29	Virtus Segafredo Bologna (Italian Basketball Federation)	67–80	(Spanish Basketball Federation) Real Madrid	Bologna
20:45	Scoring by quarter: 17–30, 16–20, 21–18, 13–12
	Pts: Morgan 11; Rebs: Shengelia 7 Asts: Cordinier, Morgan 4 PIR: Shengelia 13	Boxscore	Pts: Musa, Tavares 13; Rebs: Hezonja 6 Asts: Campazzo 7 PIR: Musa 16	Arena: Segafredo Arena; Attendance: 7,121; Referees: Mehdi Difallah, Tomislav Hordov, Artūras Šukys

20 March 2025 30	Real Madrid (Spanish Basketball Federation)	81–70	(French Federation of Basketball) LDLC ASVEL	Madrid
20:45	Scoring by quarter: 32–10, 20–24, 16–19, 13–17
	Pts: Tavares 23; Rebs: Hezonja, Tavares 6 Asts: Hezonja 4 PIR: Tavares 28	Boxscore	Pts: Maledon 25; Rebs: Roberson 6 Asts: Maledon 5 PIR: Maledon 35	Arena: Movistar Arena; Attendance: 7,767; Referees: Damir Javor, Saulius Račys, Mario Majkić

25 March 2025 31	Real Madrid (Spanish Basketball Federation)	96–89	(Italian Basketball Federation) EA7 Emporio Armani Milan	Madrid
20:45	Scoring by quarter: 31–16, 23–25, 24–22, 18–26
	Pts: Musa 21; Rebs: Tavares 7 Asts: Campazzo 6 PIR: Tavares 27	Boxscore	Pts: LeDay 15; Rebs: Mirotić, Causeur 4 Asts: Mirotić 5 PIR: Shields 20	Arena: Movistar Arena; Attendance: 9,544; Referees: Emin Moğulkoç, Piotr Pastusiak, Igor Dragojević

28 March 2025 32	Crvena zvezda Meridianbet (Basketball Federation of Serbia)	72–78	(Spanish Basketball Federation) Real Madrid	Belgrade
20:00	Scoring by quarter: 9–22, 18–20, 18–13, 27–23
	Pts: Miller-McIntyre 24; Rebs: three players 7 Asts: Kalinić 5 PIR: Miller-McIntyre 17	Boxscore	Pts: Tavares 14; Rebs: Tavares 10; Asts: Campazzo, Llull 5 PIR: Tavares 19	Arena: Belgrade Arena; Attendance: 20,997; Referees: Robert Lottermoser, Gytis Vilius, Kristaps Konstantinovs

3 April 2025 33	Real Madrid (Spanish Basketball Federation)	105–104	(French Federation of Basketball) Paris Basketball	Madrid
21:00	Scoring by quarter: 23–28, 30–25, 21–27, 31–24
	Pts: Hezonja 26; Rebs: Tavares 9 Asts: Musa 6 PIR: Hezonja 29	Boxscore	Pts: Shorts 24; Rebs: Ward 10; Asts: Shorts 10; PIR: Shorts 23	Arena: Movistar Arena; Attendance: 9,769; Referees: Saša Pukl, Uroš Nikolić, Luka Kardum

10 April 2025 34	Partizan Mozzart Bet (Basketball Federation of Serbia)	89–91	(Spanish Basketball Federation) Real Madrid	Belgrade
20:30	Scoring by quarter: 24–22, 22–26, 28–17, 15–26
	Pts: Davies 22; Rebs: Bonga 11; Asts: C. Jones 6 PIR: Davies 22	Boxscore	Pts: Musa 15; Rebs: Ibaka 10; Asts: Campazzo 7 PIR: Campazzo 23	Arena: Belgrade Arena; Attendance: 19,212; Referees: Mehdi Difallah, Saulius Račys, Michele Rossi

=== EuroLeague Playoffs ===
==== Play-ins ====
15 April 2025 Play-in A	Real Madrid (Spain)	73–81	(French Federation of Basketball) Paris Basketball	Madrid
21:00	Scoring by quarter: 22–27, 14–19, 22–16, 15–19
	Pts: Campazzo 17; Rebs: Deck 8 Asts: Campazzo 5 PIR: Campazzo 23	Boxscore	Pts: Shorts 23; Rebs: Ward, Jantunen 7 Asts: Shorts 9 PIR: Shorts 27	Arena: Movistar Arena; Attendance: 11,086; Referees: Ilija Belošević, Robert Lottermoser, Borys Ryzhyk

18 April 2025 Play-in C	Real Madrid (Spain)	93–71	(German Basketball Federation) Bayern Munich	Madrid
20:45	Scoring by quarter: 33–17, 19–16, 21–22, 20–16
	Pts: Hezonja 19; Rebs: Hezonja 7 Asts: Campazzo 5 PIR: Hezonja 24	Boxscore	Pts: Napier 19; Rebs: Napier, Voigtmann 4 Asts: Weiler-Babb, Voigtmann 4 PIR: Napier 22	Arena: Movistar Arena; Attendance: 9,273; Referees: Damir Javor, Mehdi Difallah, Gytis Vilius

==== Playoff series ====
23 April 2025 1	Olympiacos (Hellenic Basketball Federation)	84–72	(Spanish Basketball Federation) Real Madrid	Piraeus
20:30	Scoring by quarter: 27–14, 20–15, 17–22, 20–21
	Pts: Vezenkov 23; Rebs: Milutinov 8 Asts: Vildoza 5 PIR: Vezenkov 31	Boxscore	Pts: Llull 16; Rebs: Garuba, Hezonja 5 Asts: Campazzo 5 PIR: Llull 12	Arena: Peace and Friendship Stadium; Attendance: 12,349; Referees: Saša Pukl, Carmelo Paternicò, Milan Nedović

25 April 2025 2	Olympiacos (Greece)	77–71	(Spanish Basketball Federation) Real Madrid	Piraeus
20:30	Scoring by quarter: 15–25, 23–13, 19–16, 20–17
	Pts: Vezenkov 22; Rebs: Vezenkov 7 Asts: Walkup 6 PIR: Milutinov 23	Boxscore	Pts: Hezonja 22; Rebs: Hezonja 8 Asts: Llull 4 PIR: Hezonja 24	Arena: Peace and Friendship Stadium; Attendance: 12,349; Referees: Sreten Radović, Oļegs Latiševs, Uroš Nikolić

29 April 2025 3	Real Madrid (Spain)	80–72	(Hellenic Basketball Federation) Olympiacos	Madrid
21:00	Scoring by quarter: 28–21, 10–23, 20–12, 22–16
	Pts: Tavares 15; Rebs: three players 5 Asts: Abalde 6 PIR: Musa, Tavares 20	Boxscore	Pts: Vezenkov 21; Rebs: Vezenkov 9 Asts: Walkup 6 PIR: Vezenkov 26	Arena: Movistar Arena; Attendance: 10,187; Referees: Ilija Belošević, Mehdi Difallah, Luka Kardum

1 May 2025 4	Real Madrid (Spain)	84–86	(Hellenic Basketball Federation) Olympiacos	Madrid
21:00	Scoring by quarter: 21–16, 26–26, 18–26, 19–18
	Pts: Hezonja 21; Rebs: Feliz, Hezonja 6 Asts: Abalde 7 PIR: Hezonja 18	Boxscore	Pts: Fournier 23; Rebs: Milutinov 8 Asts: Vezenkov 6 PIR: Fournier 18	Arena: Movistar Arena; Attendance: 11,368; Referees: Damir Javor, Milivoje Jovčić, Milan Nedović

=== Copa del Rey ===
14 February 2025 Quarterfinal	Real Madrid	92–69	Baxi Manresa	Las Palmas
18:30	Scoring by quarter: 22–22, 21–8, 20–19, 29–20
	Pts: Hezonja 24; Rebs: Musa 8 Asts: Llull 4 PIR: Hezonja 25	Boxscore	Pts: Alston 17; Rebs: Massa 9 Asts: Obasohan 4 PIR: Massa 22	Arena: Gran Canaria Arena; Attendance: 9,218; Referees: Carlos Peruga, Jordi Aliaga, Alfonso Olivares

15 February 2025 Semifinal	Dreamland Gran Canaria	63–80	Real Madrid	Las Palmas
21:30	Scoring by quarter: 16–10, 15–20, 16–25, 16–25
	Pts: Homesley 15; Rebs: Salvó 8 Asts: Homesley 5 PIR: Salvó 15	Boxscore	Pts: Hezonja 14; Rebs: Tavares 11; Asts: Campazzo 7 PIR: Tavares 19	Arena: Gran Canaria Arena; Attendance: 9,800; Referees: Antonio Conde, Fernando Calatrava, Arnau Padrós

16 February 2025 Final	Unicaja	93–79	Real Madrid	Las Palmas
20:00	Scoring by quarter: 18–15, 21–21, 25–19, 29–24
	Pts: Perry 27; Rebs: Taylor 8 Asts: Perry 6 PIR: Perry 32	Boxscore	Pts: Campazzo, Llull 14; Rebs: Campazzo, Tavares 6 Asts: Campazzo 5 PIR: Campazzo 21	Arena: Gran Canaria Arena; Attendance: 9,870; Referees: Emilio Pérez Pizarro, Óscar Perea, Jordi Aliaga

=== Supercopa de España ===
21 September 2024 Semifinal	Real Madrid	89–83	Barça	Murcia
18:30	Scoring by quarter: 20–18, 21–24, 26–19, 22–22
	Pts: Campazzo 18; Rebs: Deck 10; Asts: Campazzo 6 PIR: Campazzo 33	Boxscore	Pts: Parker 17; Rebs: Metu 6 Asts: Laprovíttola 8 PIR: Parker 17	Arena: Palacio de Deportes; Attendance: 7,400; Referees: Carlos Peruga, Fernando Calatrava, Luis Miguel Castillo

22 September 2024 Final	Real Madrid	80–90	Unicaja	Murcia
20:00	Scoring by quarter: 19–32, 26–17, 18–19, 17–22
	Pts: Campazzo 19; Rebs: Tavares 13; Asts: Llull 3 PIR: Tavares 16	Boxscore	Pts: Taylor 22; Rebs: Taylor 6 Asts: Taylor 6 PIR: Taylor 29	Arena: Palacio de Deportes; Attendance: 7,400; Referees: Carlos Peruga, Sergio Manuel, Iyán González

== Statistics ==
=== Liga ACB ===
Player	GP	GS	MPG	2FG%	3FG%	FT%	RPG	APG	SPG	BPG	PPG	PIR
Dennis Smith Jr.	2	0	7:19	–	50%	–	0.5	1	0.5	–	1.5	1.5
Alberto Abalde	43	29	19:48	49.6%	41.7%	77.2%	2.5	1.3	0.6	–	6.8	7.7
Facundo Campazzo	40	38	23	59.1%	35.8%	87.6%	2.1	4.9	1.5	–	11.1	15.2
Xavier Rathan-Mayes	29	6	12:49	50.9%	29.6%	65.5%	1	1.3	0.4	0.1	4.7	3.3
Hugo González	36	6	13:07	55.3%	25%	76.6%	2.2	0.8	0.4	0.3	4.5	4.2
Mario Hezonja	40	16	24:23	52.1%	38.6%	83.7%	5	1.2	1.1	0.1	14.1	14.1
Džanan Musa	36	22	19:03	55.2%	43.3%	84.3%	2.8	1.4	0.7	0.2	12.9	14.1
Gabriel Deck	19	10	22:31	55.4%	32.5%	73.8%	3.6	0.9	0.4	0.2	8	9.1
Usman Garuba	33	9	15:02	62.6%	26.8%	67.5%	3.6	0.5	0.7	0.7	5.3	6.4
Serge Ibaka	20	1	13:31	62.7%	36.4%	60%	3.1	0.8	0.3	1.1	6.6	8
Bruno Fernando	22	2	15:17	61.4%	50%	59.4%	5	0.6	0.5	0.8	6.6	9
Edy Tavares	41	38	21:47	65.6%	–	66.1%	6.8	1	0.4	1.6	8.7	15
Sergio Llull	40	8	16:37	48.9%	34.7%	84.3%	1.5	2.3	0.4	0.1	8.6	7.8
Andrés Feliz	38	2	18:39	58.5%	32.9%	80.3%	3.2	2.3	0.8	0.1	7.3	8.9
Eli Ndiaye	36	28	14:07	56.4%	28.4%	61.9%	2.8	0.3	0.4	0.2	3.8	3.6
Sidi Gueye	4	0	5:31	20%	–	75%	1	–	0.3	0.5	1.3	3.3
Declan Duru	1	0	1:36	–	–	–	–	–	–	–	–	-1
Gildas Giménez	1	0	0:53	–	–	–	–	–	–	–	–	0
TOTAL				56.9%	35.6%	77.8%	38.4	16.6	7.5	3.9	88.2	104.8

Source: ACB

=== EuroLeague ===
Player	GP	GS	MPG	2FG%	3FG%	FT%	RPG	APG	SPG	BPG	PPG	PIR
Dennis Smith Jr.	2	1	10:19	50%	–	100%	1.5	0.5	–	–	4	0.5
Alberto Abalde	39	28	18:52	58.9%	46%	88.5%	2.4	1.7	0.5	–	5.9	6.6
Facundo Campazzo	39	33	25:44	56.1%	33.8%	86%	3.1	6	1	0.1	12	17.5
Xavier Rathan-Mayes	23	5	11:58	51.5%	35.7%	63.2%	0.9	1.4	0.5	–	5.3	3.9
Hugo González	30	1	7:32	35.7%	33.3%	68.8%	1.3	0.3	0.1	0.3	1.9	1.2
Mario Hezonja	38	17	27:03	61.5%	31.5%	81.9%	5.3	1.5	0.8	0.1	14.9	14.3
Džanan Musa	35	23	21:47	53.3%	37.2%	81.2%	2.9	2	0.4	0.1	12.2	12.5
Gabriel Deck	28	15	23:22	61.8%	41.2%	65.4%	3.2	1.4	0.5	0.2	8	8.6
Usman Garuba	27	9	14:05	65.5%	23.5%	50%	3.1	0.6	0.6	0.4	3.9	3.8
Serge Ibaka	29	2	12:19	63.2%	31.7%	75%	3.2	0.7	0.2	0.5	6.2	6
Bruno Fernando	12	2	13:52	56.8%	–	78.3%	3	0.6	0.4	0.3	5	5.6
Edy Tavares	40	37	23:15	73.8%	–	72.2%	6.6	1.2	0.7	1.2	10.2	15.3
Sergio Llull	40	3	17:05	40.5%	29.2%	81.2%	1.4	2.2	0.4	–	6.6	5.1
Andrés Feliz	33	5	14:11	54.4%	29.2%	62.1%	1.8	1.6	0.7	0.1	4.8	4.8
Eli Ndiaye	25	19	13:58	54.5%	34.1%	66.7%	2.4	0.5	0.6	0.1	3.6	4.2
Sidi Gueye	3	0	1:35	–	–	100%	–	–	–	–	0.7	0.3
Declan Duru	1	0	0:57	–	–	–	–	–	–	–	–	-2
TOTAL				59.3%	33.6%	77.5%	36.6	18.7	6	2.8	84.2	96.1

Source: EuroLeague
