= 2023–24 Real Madrid Baloncesto season =

Real Madrid
2023–24 season
- President: (Spain) Florentino Pérez
- Head coach: (Spain) Chus Mateo
- Arena: WiZink Center
- Liga ACB: Winners
- EuroLeague: Runners-up
- Copa del Rey: Winners
- Supercopa de España: Winners
- Highest home attendance: Liga ACB: 12,025; Real Madrid 104–98 Barcelona (31 May 2024) EuroLeague: 11,432; Real Madrid 65–64 Barcelona (26 October 2023)
- Lowest home attendance: Liga ACB: 6,123; Real Madrid 94–80 Granada (5 May 2024) EuroLeague: 5,984; Real Madrid 86–79 ASVEL (1 February 2024)
- Average home attendance: Liga ACB: 8,592; EuroLeague: 8,914
- Biggest win: Real Madrid 105–70 Gran Canaria (15 May 2024)
- Biggest defeat: AS Monaco 98–74 Real Madrid (19 January 2024)
Home	Away

The 2023–24 season was Real Madrid's 93rd in existence, their 68th consecutive season in the top flight of Spanish basketball and 17th consecutive season in the EuroLeague.

Times up to 29 October 2023 and from 31 March 2024 are CEST (UTC+2). Times from 29 October 2023 to 31 March 2024 are CET (UTC+1).

== Overview ==
=== Pre-season ===
On 24 June, Real Madrid announced that Ádám Hanga left the club at the expiration of his contract. He was followed by Petr Cornelie, Nigel Williams-Goss and Anthony Randolph.

On 28 June, Gabriel Deck extended his contract with Madrid until 2028. On 11 July, another extension was announced, as Rudy Fernández signed a new deal until 2024. A day later, Sergio Rodríguez also extended for a further year.

On 18 July, Madrid announced the first new signing of the summer, as Facundo Campazzo returned to the club on a four-year deal.

== Players ==
=== Squad information ===
Note: Flags indicate national team eligibility at FIBA-sanctioned events. Players may hold other non-FIBA nationalities not displayed.

Real Madrid roster
Players
Coaches

Pos.	No.	Nat.	Name	Ht.	Wt.	Age
SG	1	(France)	Causeur, Fabien	1.96 m (6 ft 5 in)	86 kg (190 lb)	39 – 16 June 1987
G/F	5	(Spain)	Fernández, Rudy	1.96 m (6 ft 5 in)	83 kg (183 lb)	41 – 4 April 1985
SF	6	(Spain)	Abalde, Alberto	2.02 m (6 ft 8 in)	95 kg (209 lb)	30 – 15 December 1995
PG	7	(Argentina)	Campazzo, Facundo	1.78 m (5 ft 10 in)	84 kg (185 lb)	35 – 23 March 1991
SF	9	(Spain)	González, Hugo	1.98 m (6 ft 6 in)	94 kg (207 lb)	20 – 5 February 2006
F	11	(Croatia)	Hezonja, Mario	2.06 m (6 ft 9 in)	102 kg (225 lb)	31 – 25 February 1995
PG	12	(Spain)	Alocén, Carlos	1.94 m (6 ft 4 in)	84 kg (185 lb)	25 – 30 December 2000
PG	13	(Spain)	Rodríguez, Sergio	1.91 m (6 ft 3 in)	83 kg (183 lb)	40 – 12 June 1986
F	14	(Argentina)	Deck, Gabriel	1.98 m (6 ft 6 in)	105 kg (231 lb)	31 – 8 February 1995
C	17	(France)	Poirier, Vincent	2.13 m (7 ft 0 in)	110 kg (243 lb)	33 – 17 October 1993
C	22	(Cape Verde)	Tavares, Edy	2.20 m (7 ft 3 in)	125 kg (276 lb)	34 – 22 March 1992
G	23	(Spain)	Llull, Sergio (C)	1.90 m (6 ft 3 in)	94 kg (207 lb)	38 – 15 November 1987
PF	28	(France)	Yabusele, Guerschon	2.01 m (6 ft 7 in)	123 kg (271 lb)	30 – 17 December 1995
F/C	30	(Senegal) (Spain)	Ndiaye, Eli	2.04 m (6 ft 8 in)	95 kg (209 lb)	22 – 26 June 2004
G/F	31	(Bosnia and Herzegovina)	Musa, Džanan	2.05 m (6 ft 9 in)	101 kg (223 lb)	27 – 8 May 1999

Head coach

- (Spain) Chus Mateo

Assistant coach(es)

- (Spain) Paco Redondo
- (Spain) Isidoro Calin
- (Spain) Guillermo Frutos

Athletic trainer(s)

- (Spain) Juan Trapero

Legend

- (C) Team captain
- Injured

- Roster
Updated: 26 July 2024

=== Depth chart ===
Pos.	Starting 5	Bench 1	Bench 2	Bench 3
C	Edy Tavares *	Vincent Poirier
PF	Guerschon Yabusele	Gabriel Deck †		Eli Ndiaye *
SF	Mario Hezonja *	Rudy Fernández *	Alberto Abalde *	Hugo González *
SG	Džanan Musa	Sergio Llull *	Fabien Causeur
PG	Facundo Campazzo	Sergio Rodríguez *		Carlos Alocén *

† indicates an overseas player.

* indicates a "cupo" player.

In compliance with ACB's homegrown player policy, only 2 overseas players can be in the roster for every given match, with the exception of those holding a European citizenship, or from any country with an association treaty, such as the Cotonou Agreement. In addition to that, at least 4 of the players in a 12 or more player roster must be "cupo" players (i.e. they are Spanish, or must have been in the youth systems of a Spanish club for at least 3 years). Euroleague Basketball does not have any policy in regards of players' origin, so it is possible for teams to call more than two overseas players for a match in Euroleague competitions.

=== Transactions ===
==== In ====
No.	Pos.	Nat.	Name	Age	Moving from		Type	Ends	Transfer fee	Date	Source
7	PG	(Argentina)	Facundo Campazzo	35	Crvena zvezda	(Serbia)	Transfer	June 2027	Free	18 July 2023	

==== Out ====
No.	Pos.	Nat.	Name	Age	Moving to		Type	Transfer fee	Date	Source
0	G	(United States)	Nigel Williams-Goss	32	Olympiacos	(Greece)	End of contract	Free	27 June 2023	
3	F/C	(United States) (Slovenia)	Anthony Randolph	37	Retirement		End of contract	Free	29 June 2023	
8	SF	(Hungary)	Ádám Hanga	37	Crvena zvezda	(Serbia)	End of contract	Free	24 June 2023	
21	F/C	(France)	Petr Cornelie	31	AS Monaco	(France)	End of contract	Free	26 June 2023	

== Pre-season and friendlies ==
=== Friendly matches ===
2 September 2023	Surne Bilbao Basket	85–81	Real Madrid	Pamplona
19:45	Scoring by quarter: 18–17, 23–18, 19–20, 25–26
	Pts: Smith 15	Report	Pts: Deck 19	Arena: Navarra Arena

9 September 2023 Trofeo Costa del Sol	Real Madrid (Spanish Basketball Federation)	85–65	(German Basketball Federation) Bayern Munich	Rincón de la Victoria
19:30	Scoring by quarter: 25–18, 16–18, 26–16, 18–13
	Pts: Hezonja 20	Report	Pts: Edwards 14	Arena: Polideportivo Ruben Ruzafa

10 September 2023 Trofeo Costa del Sol	Unicaja	83–66	Real Madrid	Málaga
18:30	Scoring by quarter: 19–9, 16–18, 21–23, 27–16
	Pts: Đedović, Thomas 15	Report	Pts: Hezonja 17	Arena: Martín Carpena

10 October 2023	Real Madrid (Spanish Basketball Federation)	127–123	(USA Basketball) Dallas Mavericks	Madrid
20:45	Scoring by quarter: 38–37, 27–34, 25–28, 37–24
	Pts: Campazzo 20	Report	Pts: Hardaway 21	Arena: WiZink Center; Attendance: 12,763

== Competitions ==
=== Overview ===
Competition	First match	Last match	Starting round	Final position	Record							
Competition	First match	Last match	Starting round	Final position	Pld	W	D	L	PF	PA	PD	Win %
Liga ACB	24 September 2023	12 June 2024	Round 1	Winners	42	36		6	3,722	3,328	+394	85.71
EuroLeague	6 October 2023	26 May 2024	Round 1	Runners-up	39	31		8	3,384	3,114	+270	79.49
Copa del Rey	15 February 2024	18 February 2024	Quarter-finals	Winners	3	3		0	275	240	+35	100.00
Supercopa de España	16 September 2023	17 September 2023	Semi-finals	Winners	2	2		0	178	161	+17	100.00
Total					86	72	0	14	7,559	6,843	+716	83.72

Last updated: 12 June 2024
Source: Competitions

=== Liga ACB ===
==== League table ====
Pos	Team	Pld	W	L	PF	PA	PD	Qualification or relegation
1	Unicaja	34	28	6	3016	2627	+389	Qualification to playoffs
2	Real Madrid	34	28	6	3001	2707	+294	Qualification to playoffs
3	Barça	34	23	11	2985	2769	+216	Qualification to playoffs
4	Valencia Basket	34	21	13	2856	2788	+68	Qualification to playoffs
5	UCAM Murcia	34	21	13	2829	2735	+94	Qualification to playoffs

Source: ACB
Rules for classification: 1) Win–loss record; 2) Head–to–head record; 3) Head–to–head point difference; 4) Point difference; 5) Points scored; 6) Sum of quotients of points scored (Note: Head–to–head record is used only after all the matches between the teams in question have been played)

==== Results summary ====
Overall						Home					Away				
Pld	W	L	PF	PA	PD	W	L	PF	PA	PD	W	L	PF	PA	PD
34	28	6	3001	2707	+294	15	2	1546	1348	+198	13	4	1455	1359	+96

Last updated: 12 May 2024.
Source: Competitive matches

==== Results by round ====
Round	1	2	3	4	5	6	7	8	9	10	11	12	13	14	15	16	17	18	19	20	21	22	23	24	25	26	27	28	29	30	31	32	33	34
Ground	H	A	H	A	H	A	H	A	A	H	H	H	H	A	A	H	A	A	H	A	H	A	A	H	A	A	H	A	H	A	H	H	A	H
Result	W	W	W	W	W	W	W	W	W	L	W	W	W	W	W	W	W	L	W	L	W	W	W	W	W	W	L	L	W	W	W	W	L	W
Position	1	1	1	1	1	1	1	1	1	1	1	1	1	1	1	1	1	1	1	1	1	1	1	1	1	1	1	2	2	2	1	1	2	2

Source: Competitive matches
A = Away; H = Home; W = Win; L = Loss; R = Rest

==== Matches ====
24 September 2023 1	Real Madrid	101–70	Casademont Zaragoza	Madrid
12:30	Scoring by quarter: 33–18, 24–13, 26–19, 18–20
	Pts: Tavares 15; Rebs: Hezonja 7 Asts: Campazzo 7 PIR: Tavares 19	Boxscore	Pts: Yusta 16; Rebs: Yusta 5 Asts: Bell-Haynes 3 PIR: Yusta 16	Arena: WiZink Center; Attendance: 6,731; Referees: Óscar Perea, Jorge Martínez, Yasmina Alcaraz

29 September 2023 2	Baxi Manresa	88–94	Real Madrid	Manresa
21:00	Scoring by quarter: 26–22, 16–21, 25–30, 21–21
	Pts: Badio 16; Rebs: Geben, Vaulet 6 Asts: Pérez 9 PIR: Geben, Badio 14	Boxscore	Pts: Musa 23; Rebs: Musa 7 Asts: Campazzo 8 PIR: Musa 31	Arena: Nou Congost; Attendance: 4,855; Referees: Carlos Peruga, Francisco Araña, Roberto Lucas

1 October 2023 3	Real Madrid	86–79	Barça	Madrid
18:30	Scoring by quarter: 14–13, 23–20, 22–17, 27–29
	Pts: Poirier 22; Rebs: Diagne, Poirier 8 Asts: three players 5 PIR: Poirier 29	Boxscore	Pts: Brizuela 14; Rebs: Parra 8 Asts: three players 4 PIR: Jokubaitis 18	Arena: WiZink Center; Attendance: 11,235; Referees: Martín Caballero, Juan de Dios Oyón, Joaquín García

8 October 2023 4	Bàsquet Girona	74–93	Real Madrid	Girona
18:30	Scoring by quarter: 17–23, 11–22, 24–33, 22–15
	Pts: Iroegbu 17; Rebs: Martínez 6 Asts: Iroegbu 4 PIR: Iroegbu 23	Boxscore	Pts: Musa 14; Rebs: Diagne, Poirier 6 Asts: Campazzo 7 PIR: Campazzo, Poirier 19	Arena: Fontajau; Attendance: 5,249; Referees: Emilio Pérez Pizarro, Alberto Sánchez Sixto, David Sánchez

15 October 2023 5	Real Madrid	106–92	UCAM Murcia	Madrid
12:30	Scoring by quarter: 15–22, 27–15, 39–25, 25–30
	Pts: Tavares 18; Rebs: Tavares 8 Asts: Campazzo 10; PIR: Tavares 24	Boxscore	Pts: Birgander 16; Rebs: Kurucs 5 Asts: Håkanson 4 PIR: Birgander 21	Arena: WiZink Center; Attendance: 7,492; Referees: Jordi Aliaga, Esperanza Mendoza, Alberto Baena

22 October 2023 6	Lenovo Tenerife	76–82	Real Madrid	San Cristóbal de La Laguna
13:00	Scoring by quarter: 14–27, 20–20, 27–18, 15–17
	Pts: Fernández 18; Rebs: three players 6 Asts: Huertas 6 PIR: Fernández 16	Boxscore	Pts: Tavares 14; Rebs: Tavares 8 Asts: Rodríguez 6 PIR: Tavares 23	Arena: Santiago Martín; Attendance: 5,197; Referees: Miguel Ángel Pérez Pérez, Carlos Cortés, Javier Torres

29 October 2023 7	Real Madrid	91–68	Zunder Palencia	Madrid
12:30	Scoring by quarter: 30–11, 22–14, 15–18, 24–25
	Pts: Hezonja 16; Rebs: Tavares 13; Asts: Campazzo 6 PIR: Tavares 23	Boxscore	Pts: Benite 13; Rebs: Pasečņiks 9 Asts: Brown 3 PIR: Pasečņiks 20	Arena: WiZink Center; Attendance: 9,106; Referees: Carlos Peruga, Andrés Fernández, Guillermo Ríos

5 November 2023 8	Covirán Granada	76–83	Real Madrid	Granada
12:30	Scoring by quarter: 13–25, 21–15, 31–22, 11–21
	Pts: Krämer 16; Rebs: Tomàs 8 Asts: Costa 11; PIR: Costa 21	Boxscore	Pts: Campazzo 21; Rebs: Poirier 10; Asts: Campazzo 5 PIR: Campazzo 29	Arena: Palacio de Deportes; Attendance: 8,014; Referees: Juan Carlos García González, Arnau Padrós, Yasmina Alcaraz

12 November 2023 9	Surne Bilbao Basket	84–87	Real Madrid	Bilbao
17:00	Scoring by quarter: 11–20, 22–16, 23–27, 28–24
	Pts: Kullamäe 17; Rebs: Killeya-Jones, De Ridder 5 Asts: Smith, Pantzar 4 PIR: Pantzar 21	Boxscore	Pts: Campazzo 21; Rebs: Tavares 10; Asts: Campazzo 7 PIR: Campazzo 29	Arena: Bilbao Arena; Attendance: 9,897; Referees: Óscar Perea, Jorge Martínez, Cristóbal Sánchez

19 November 2023 10	Real Madrid	93–99	Unicaja	Madrid
12:30	Scoring by quarter: 25–26, 29–13, 18–27, 21–33
	Pts: Campazzo 18; Rebs: three players 5 Asts: Campazzo 5 PIR: Campazzo 16	Boxscore	Pts: Kravish 23; Rebs: Kravish, Díaz 6 Asts: Díaz 7 PIR: Taylor 27	Arena: WiZink Center; Attendance: 8,556; Referees: Emilio Pérez Pizarro, Javier Torres, Alberto Sánchez Sixto

26 November 2023 11	Real Madrid	85–76	MoraBanc Andorra	Madrid
12:30	Scoring by quarter: 20–16, 23–17, 26–26, 16–17
	Pts: Hezonja 21; Rebs: Tavares 9 Asts: Rodríguez 9 PIR: Tavares 30	Boxscore	Pts: Montero 25; Rebs: Marić 8 Asts: Montero 5 PIR: Montero 30	Arena: WiZink Center; Attendance: 6,272; Referees: Antonio Conde, Rubén Sánchez Mohedas, Vicente Martínez

3 December 2023 12	Real Madrid	91–58	Río Breogán	Madrid
12:30	Scoring by quarter: 17–19, 24–9, 27–12, 23–18
	Pts: Musa 17; Rebs: Ndiaye 9 Asts: Abalde 6 PIR: Musa 21	Boxscore	Pts: Fernández 19; Rebs: Fernández 7 Asts: Rudan 4 PIR: Fernández 18	Arena: WiZink Center; Attendance: 6,998; Referees: Óscar Perea, Arnau Padrós, Cristóbal Sánchez

10 December 2023 13	Real Madrid	97–71	Dreamland Gran Canaria	Madrid
12:30	Scoring by quarter: 31–14, 23–23, 20–16, 23–18
	Pts: Hezonja 19; Rebs: Poirier 6 Asts: Rodríguez 6 PIR: Hezonja 22	Boxscore	Pts: Happ 26; Rebs: three players 6 Asts: Bassas 10; PIR: Happ 25	Arena: WiZink Center; Attendance: 7,731; Referees: Fernando Calatrava, Iyán González, Carlos Merino

16 December 2023 14	Monbus Obradoiro	74–85	Real Madrid	Santiago de Compostela
20:45	Scoring by quarter: 19–15, 15–24, 14–23, 26–23
	Pts: Tinkle 18; Rebs: Tinkle 7 Asts: Zurbriggen 5 PIR: Tinkle 21	Boxscore	Pts: Musa 17; Rebs: Abalde 7 Asts: Rodríguez 8 PIR: Tavares 20	Arena: Fontes do Sar; Attendance: 6,000; Referees: Emilio Pérez Pizarro, Juan de Dios Oyón, Vicente Martínez

23 December 2023 15	Joventut	73–101	Real Madrid	Badalona
18:30	Scoring by quarter: 18–26, 17–27, 20–26, 18–22
	Pts: Andrews 11; Rebs: Tomić 9 Asts: Ribas, Tomić 3 PIR: Ribas 12	Boxscore	Pts: Musa 15; Rebs: Hezonja 6 Asts: Campazzo 5 PIR: Musa 21	Arena: Palau Municipal d'Esports; Attendance: 11,104; Referees: Luis Miguel Castillo, Sergio Manuel, Raúl Zamorano

31 December 2023 16	Real Madrid	83–74	Valencia Basket	Madrid
12:30	Scoring by quarter: 20–15, 21–19, 26–19, 16–21
	Pts: Campazzo 17; Rebs: Tavares 10; Asts: Campazzo 7 PIR: Tavares 29	Boxscore	Pts: Jones 19; Rebs: Ojeleye, Inglis 8 Asts: Jones 5 PIR: Jones 20	Arena: WiZink Center; Attendance: 9,640; Referees: Benjamín Jiménez, Alfonso Olivares, Roberto Lucas

7 January 2024 17	Baskonia	85–99	Real Madrid	Vitoria-Gasteiz
18:30	Scoring by quarter: 20–35, 23–16, 23–22, 19–26
	Pts: Miller-McIntyre, Howard 16; Rebs: Costello 6 Asts: Chiozza, Kotsar 3 PIR: Moneke 20	Boxscore	Pts: Yabusele 26; Rebs: Poirier 9 Asts: Campazzo 5 PIR: Campazzo, Musa 25	Arena: Buesa Arena; Attendance: 15,313; Referees: Antonio Conde, Rafael Serrano, Arnau Padrós

14 January 2024 18	UCAM Murcia	73–61	Real Madrid	Murcia
12:30	Scoring by quarter: 19–16, 17–10, 16–25, 21–10
	Pts: Ennis 18; Rebs: Todorović, Diagne 7 Asts: Ennis 4 PIR: Sleva 16	Boxscore	Pts: Campazzo 15; Rebs: Yabusele, Hezonja 8 Asts: three players 3 PIR: Yabusele 15	Arena: Palacio de Deportes; Attendance: 7,500; Referees: Jordi Aliaga, Juan de Dios Oyón, Andrés Fernández

21 January 2024 19	Real Madrid	95–80	Surne Bilbao Basket	Madrid
18:30	Scoring by quarter: 30–22, 18–16, 28–14, 19–28
	Pts: Yabusele 16; Rebs: Poirier 7 Asts: Campazzo 10; PIR: Poirier, Campazzo 20	Boxscore	Pts: Hlinason 19; Rebs: Killeya-Jones 5 Asts: Renfroe 7 PIR: Hlinason 26	Arena: WiZink Center; Attendance: 8,122; Referees: Martín Caballero, Vicente Martínez, David Sánchez

28 January 2024 20	Dreamland Gran Canaria	100–77	Real Madrid	Las Palmas
13:00	Scoring by quarter: 25–9, 32–27, 21–24, 22–17
	Pts: Happ 17; Rebs: Brussino 7 Asts: Bassas, Albicy 4 PIR: Slaughter 21	Boxscore	Pts: Musa 17; Rebs: Poirier 9 Asts: three players 3 PIR: Musa, Poirier 17	Arena: Gran Canaria Arena; Attendance: 9,103; Referees: Juan Carlos García González, Luis Miguel Castillo, Fabio Fernández

4 February 2024 21	Real Madrid	92–79	Bàsquet Girona	Madrid
12:30	Scoring by quarter: 28–18, 20–26, 20–14, 24–21
	Pts: Poirier 19; Rebs: Poirier 10; Asts: Campazzo 8 PIR: Poirier 37	Boxscore	Pts: Iroegbu 16; Rebs: four players 5 Asts: Colom 8 PIR: Marcos 15	Arena: WiZink Center; Attendance: 8,513; Referees: Carlos Cortés, Jorge Martínez, Esperanza Mendoza

11 February 2024 22	Río Breogán	73–80	Real Madrid	Lugo
12:30	Scoring by quarter: 24–15, 18–24, 15–15, 16–26
	Pts: McLemore 21; Rebs: McLemore 5 Asts: Quintela 5 PIR: McLemore 19	Boxscore	Pts: Llull 17; Rebs: Deck 9 Asts: Campazzo 7 PIR: Tavares 19	Arena: Pazo dos Deportes; Attendance: 5,310; Referees: Óscar Perea, Rafael Serrano, Iyán González

3 March 2024 23	MoraBanc Andorra	70–89	Real Madrid	Andorra la Vella
12:30	Scoring by quarter: 16–26, 25–11, 14–31, 15–21
	Pts: Harding 19; Rebs: Pérez 7 Asts: Montero 10; PIR: Montero 22	Boxscore	Pts: Yabusele 18; Rebs: Tavares 12; Asts: Campazzo 8 PIR: Tavares 28	Arena: Pavelló de Govern; Attendance: 4,733; Referees: Benjamín Jiménez, Javier Torres, Alberto Baena

10 March 2024 24	Real Madrid	80–78	Lenovo Tenerife	Madrid
12:30	Scoring by quarter: 20–19, 18–22, 25–18, 17–19
	Pts: five players 10; Rebs: Tavares 10; Asts: Llull 4 PIR: Musa 20	Boxscore	Pts: Guy 14; Rebs: Guerra 12; Asts: Fitipaldo 5 PIR: Guerra 22	Arena: WiZink Center; Attendance: 9,282; Referees: Carlos Peruga, Francisco Araña, Cristóbal Sánchez

17 March 2024 25	Unicaja	81–87	Real Madrid	Málaga
18:30	Scoring by quarter: 19–24, 21–24, 24–16, 17–23
	Pts: Osetkowski 20; Rebs: Thomas, Díaz 5 Asts: Kalinoski, Díaz 4 PIR: Osetkowski 23	Boxscore	Pts: Musa 19; Rebs: Yabusele 8 Asts: Campazzo 7 PIR: Musa 21	Arena: Martín Carpena; Attendance: 10,681; Referees: Emilio Pérez Pizarro, Carlos Cortés, Roberto Lucas

24 March 2024 26	Zunder Palencia	78–86	Real Madrid	Palencia
12:30	Scoring by quarter: 13–17, 17–26, 26–23, 22–20
	Pts: Hands 21; Rebs: three players 6 Asts: van der Vuurst 6 PIR: Hands 26	Boxscore	Pts: Musa 21; Rebs: Campazzo, Yabusele 5 Asts: Campazzo 6 PIR: Campazzo 35	Arena: Pabellón Municipal; Attendance: 5,015; Referees: Miguel Ángel Pérez Pérez, Alberto Sánchez Sixto, Iyán González

31 March 2024 27	Real Madrid	72–83	Baxi Manresa	Madrid
12:30	Scoring by quarter: 15–17, 19–24, 18–19, 20–23
	Pts: Poirier 19; Rebs: Poirier 9 Asts: Rodríguez 6 PIR: Poirier 32	Boxscore	Pts: Badio 20; Rebs: Oriola 10; Asts: García 5 PIR: Robinson 20	Arena: WiZink Center; Attendance: 7,678; Referees: Rafael Serrano, Sergio Manuel, David Sánchez

7 April 2024 28	Barça	85–79	Real Madrid	Barcelona
18:30	Scoring by quarter: 27–11, 18–22, 19–25, 21–21
	Pts: Laprovíttola 25; Rebs: Veselý 8 Asts: Satoranský, Laprovíttola 5 PIR: Laprovíttola 23	Boxscore	Pts: Deck, Musa 14; Rebs: Deck 13; Asts: Campazzo 6 PIR: Deck 25	Arena: Palau Blaugrana; Attendance: 7,726; Referees: Carlos Peruga, Martín Caballero, Francisco Araña

14 April 2024 29	Real Madrid	95–92	Joventut	Madrid
18:30	Scoring by quarter: 22–20, 15–25, 31–20, 27–27
	Pts: Hezonja 20; Rebs: Poirier 9 Asts: Deck, Abalde 4 PIR: Hezonja 25	Boxscore	Pts: Tomić 19; Rebs: Tomić 6 Asts: Feliz 6 PIR: Tomić 24	Arena: WiZink Center; Attendance: 7,356; Referees: Óscar Perea, Luis Miguel Castillo, Vicente Martínez

21 April 2024 30	Casademont Zaragoza	70–79	Real Madrid	Zaragoza
12:30	Scoring by quarter: 17–20, 9–17, 19–26, 25–16
	Pts: Kravić 17; Rebs: Kravić 6 Asts: four players 2 PIR: Kravić 21	Boxscore	Pts: Deck 15; Rebs: Tavares 9 Asts: Campazzo 4 PIR: Campazzo 15	Arena: Pabellón Príncipe Felipe; Attendance: 6,285; Referees: Fernando Calatrava, Alfonso Olivares, Joaquín García

28 April 2024 31	Real Madrid	79–69	Monbus Obradoiro	Madrid
12:30	Scoring by quarter: 28–20, 10–17, 23–19, 18–13
	Pts: Musa 13; Rebs: Tavares 8 Asts: Musa 4 PIR: Musa 17	Boxscore	Pts: Scrubb 25; Rebs: Suárez, Pustovyi 6 Asts: Dotson 4 PIR: Scrubb 24	Arena: WiZink Center; Attendance: 7,377; Referees: Juan Carlos García González, Alberto Sánchez Sixto, Yasmina Alcaraz

5 May 2024 32	Real Madrid	94–80	Covirán Granada	Madrid
12:30	Scoring by quarter: 22–19, 29–23, 26–15, 17–23
	Pts: Abalde, Musa 14; Rebs: Tavares 9 Asts: Campazzo 5 PIR: Tavares 26	Boxscore	Pts: Dime 14; Rebs: three players 5 Asts: Costa 10; PIR: Dime, Rousselle 16	Arena: WiZink Center; Attendance: 6,123; Referees: Carlos Cortés, Arnau Padrós, Guillermo Ríos

10 May 2024 33	Valencia Basket	99–93	Real Madrid	Valencia
21:00	Scoring by quarter: 28–27, 19–22, 28–23, 24–21
	Pts: Anderson 22; Rebs: Pradilla 7 Asts: Jones 9 PIR: Jones 23	Boxscore	Pts: Musa 13; Rebs: Tavares 9 Asts: Hezonja 5 PIR: Tavares 21	Arena: La Fonteta; Attendance: 7,993; Referees: Emilio Pérez Pizarro, Jorge Martínez, Carlos Merino

12 May 2024 34	Real Madrid	106–100	Baskonia	Madrid
18:30	Scoring by quarter: 28–26, 28–21, 20–29, 30–24
	Pts: Musa 19; Rebs: Fernández, Campazzo 5 Asts: Rodríguez, Campazzo 6 PIR: Poirier 27	Boxscore	Pts: Miller-McIntyre 23; Rebs: Sedekerskis 8 Asts: Miller-McIntyre 12; PIR: Miller-McIntyre 32	Arena: WiZink Center; Attendance: 7,475; Referees: Antonio Conde, Alfonso Olivares, Iyán González

=== ACB Playoffs ===
==== Quarterfinals ====
15 May 2024 1	Real Madrid	105–70	Dreamland Gran Canaria	Madrid
20:30	Scoring by quarter: 27–25, 19–13, 31–15, 28–17
	Pts: Musa 26; Rebs: Poirier, Campazzo 5 Asts: Campazzo 7 PIR: Musa 28	Boxscore	Pts: Shurna 12; Rebs: four players 4 Asts: Bassas 5 PIR: Salvó 19	Arena: WiZink Center; Attendance: 7,516; Referees: Fernando Calatrava, Carlos Cortés, Alberto Sánchez Sixto

17 May 2024 2	Dreamland Gran Canaria	71–73	Real Madrid	Las Palmas
20:30	Scoring by quarter: 18–25, 15–18, 25–17, 13–13
	Pts: Shurna 19; Rebs: Salvó 8 Asts: Bassas 4 PIR: Shurna 18	Boxscore	Pts: Tavares 13; Rebs: Tavares 8 Asts: Campazzo 5 PIR: Tavares 20	Arena: Gran Canaria Arena; Attendance: 6,382; Referees: Carlos Peruga, Javier Torres, Vicente Martínez

==== Semifinals ====
29 May 2024 1	Real Madrid	97–78	Barça	Madrid
20:30	Scoring by quarter: 24–14, 20–22, 28–26, 25–16
	Pts: Campazzo 20; Rebs: Tavares 15; Asts: Campazzo 10; PIR: Tavares 35	Boxscore	Pts: Laprovíttola 13; Rebs: da Silva 7 Asts: Rubio 10; PIR: Rubio 22	Arena: WiZink Center; Attendance: 11,274; Referees: Carlos Peruga, Jordi Aliaga, Luis Miguel Castillo

31 May 2024 2	Real Madrid	104–98	Barça	Madrid
20:30	Scoring by quarter: 22–24, 22–16, 29–22, 31–36
	Pts: Llull, Musa 18; Rebs: Tavares 9 Asts: Hezonja 6 PIR: Hezonja 23	Boxscore	Pts: Veselý 24; Rebs: Rubio 5 Asts: Satoranský 11; PIR: Satoranský 26	Arena: WiZink Center; Attendance: 12,025; Referees: Emilio Pérez Pizarro, Fernando Calatrava, Alberto Sánchez Sixto

2 June 2024 3	Barça	92–95	Real Madrid	Barcelona
18:30	Scoring by quarter: 20–28, 25–21, 31–23, 16–23
	Pts: Parker 27; Rebs: Hernangómez 8 Asts: Laprovíttola 9 PIR: Parker 26	Boxscore	Pts: Campazzo 21; Rebs: Tavares, Yabusele 5 Asts: Musa 7 PIR: Campazzo 27	Arena: Palau Blaugrana; Attendance: 7,066; Referees: Antonio Conde, Javier Torres, Alfonso Olivares

==== Finals ====
8 June 2024 1	Real Madrid	84–76	UCAM Murcia	Madrid
20:30	Scoring by quarter: 18–13, 19–20, 27–15, 20–28
	Pts: Musa 16; Rebs: Tavares 9 Asts: Campazzo 7 PIR: Musa 20	Boxscore	Pts: Caupain 16; Rebs: Sant-Roos 8 Asts: Sant-Roos 4 PIR: Sant-Roos 22	Arena: WiZink Center; Attendance: 11,134; Referees: Carlos Peruga, Rafael Serrano, Arnau Padrós

10 June 2024 2	Real Madrid	79–63	UCAM Murcia	Madrid
20:30	Scoring by quarter: 18–15, 22–15, 17–22, 22–11
	Pts: Fernández 14; Rebs: Tavares 12; Asts: Campazzo 5 PIR: Fernández 20	Boxscore	Pts: Sleva 13; Rebs: Morin 8 Asts: Caupain 3 PIR: Kurucs 11	Arena: WiZink Center; Attendance: 11,377; Referees: Antonio Conde, Fernando Calatrava, Sergio Manuel

12 June 2024 3	UCAM Murcia	73–84	Real Madrid	Murcia
20:30	Scoring by quarter: 19–17, 21–15, 16–34, 17–18
	Pts: Ennis 18; Rebs: Sant-Roos, Ennis 5 Asts: Sant-Roos, Håkanson 3 PIR: Ennis 17	Boxscore	Pts: Musa 18; Rebs: Campazzo 7 Asts: Campazzo 6 PIR: Campazzo 28	Arena: Palacio de Deportes; Attendance: 7,500; Referees: Emilio Pérez Pizarro, Óscar Perea, Alfonso Olivares

=== EuroLeague ===
==== League table ====
Pos	Team	Pld	W	L	PF	PA	PD	Qualification
1	(Spanish Basketball Federation) Real Madrid	34	27	7	2924	2681	+243	Qualification to playoffs
2	(Hellenic Basketball Federation) Panathinaikos AKTOR	34	23	11	2752	2580	+172	Qualification to playoffs
3	(French Federation of Basketball) AS Monaco	34	23	11	2770	2671	+99	Qualification to playoffs
4	(Spanish Basketball Federation) Barcelona	34	22	12	2812	2692	+120	Qualification to playoffs
5	(Hellenic Basketball Federation) Olympiacos	34	22	12	2658	2538	+120	Qualification to playoffs

Source: EuroLeague
Rules for classification: All points scored in extra period(s) were not counted in the standings, nor for any tie-break situation.

==== Results summary ====
Overall						Home					Away				
Pld	W	L	PF	PA	PD	W	L	PF	PA	PD	W	L	PF	PA	PD
34	27	7	2924	2681	+243	14	3	1517	1387	+130	13	4	1407	1294	+113

Last updated: 11 April 2024.
Source: Competitive matches

==== Results by round ====
Round	1	2	3	4	5	6	7	8	9	10	11	12	13	14	15	16	17	18	19	20	21	22	23	24	25	26	27	28	29	30	31	32	33	34
Ground	A	A	H	H	H	A	H	A	H	H	A	A	A	H	A	H	A	A	H	A	H	A	H	H	H	A	H	H	A	A	A	H	H	A
Result	W	W	W	W	W	W	W	W	W	W	L	W	W	W	W	W	W	L	W	W	W	L	W	W	W	L	L	L	W	W	W	W	L	W
Position	7	2	1	2	1	1	1	1	1	1	1	1	1	1	1	1	1	1	1	1	1	1	1	1	1	1	1	1	1	1	1	1	1	1

Source: Competitive matches
A = Away; H = Home; W = Win; L = Loss; P = Postponed

==== Matches ====
6 October 2023 1	Baskonia (Spanish Basketball Federation)	77–79	(Spanish Basketball Federation) Real Madrid	Vitoria-Gasteiz
20:30	Scoring by quarter: 23–19, 24–24, 20–19, 10–17
	Pts: Costello 16; Rebs: Diop 11; Asts: Howard 5 PIR: Moneke 22	Boxscore	Pts: Yabusele 18; Rebs: Yabusele 8 Asts: Campazzo 5 PIR: Yabusele 22	Arena: Buesa Arena; Attendance: 14,017; Referees: Ilija Belošević, Emin Moğulkoç, Saulius Račys

12 October 2023 2	Anadolu Efes (Turkish Basketball Federation)	80–103	(Spanish Basketball Federation) Real Madrid	Istanbul
19:30	Scoring by quarter: 24–26, 17–29, 19–25, 20–23
	Pts: Thompson 20; Rebs: Žižić, Thompson 7 Asts: Thompson 5 PIR: Thompson 23	Boxscore	Pts: Yabusele 22; Rebs: Yabusele, Hezonja 8 Asts: Campazzo 10; PIR: Yabusele 39	Arena: Sinan Erdem Dome; Attendance: 15,012; Referees: Matej Boltauzer, Uroš Nikolić, Joseph Bissang

17 October 2023 3	Real Madrid (Spanish Basketball Federation)	93–79	(Lithuanian Basketball Federation) Žalgiris	Madrid
20:45	Scoring by quarter: 25–19, 28–24, 19–19, 21–17
	Pts: Deck 19; Rebs: Poirier 7 Asts: Campazzo 9 PIR: Poirier, Campazzo 28	Boxscore	Pts: Šmits 12; Rebs: Ulanovas 6 Asts: three players 3 PIR: Šmits 14	Arena: WiZink Center; Attendance: 6,778; Referees: Damir Javor, Milivoje Jovčić, Miloš Koljenšić

19 October 2023 4	Real Madrid (Spanish Basketball Federation)	88–71	(Italian Basketball Federation) EA7 Emporio Armani Milan	Madrid
20:45	Scoring by quarter: 19–25, 23–17, 25–19, 21–10
	Pts: Llull 19; Rebs: Poirier 4 Asts: Campazzo 10; PIR: Campazzo 21	Boxscore	Pts: Shields 16; Rebs: Shields 7 Asts: Melli 4 PIR: Shields 19	Arena: WiZink Center; Attendance: 7,657; Referees: Sreten Radović, Gytis Vilius, Sašo Petek

26 October 2023 5	Real Madrid (Spanish Basketball Federation)	65–64	(Spanish Basketball Federation) Barcelona	Madrid
20:45	Scoring by quarter: 12–19, 16–11, 23–11, 14–23
	Pts: Deck 20; Rebs: Hezonja 10; Asts: Campazzo 7 PIR: Deck 20	Boxscore	Pts: Hernangómez 13; Rebs: Veselý 10; Asts: Jokubaitis 4 PIR: Veselý 18	Arena: WiZink Center; Attendance: 11,432; Referees: Ilija Belošević, Milan Nedović, Luka Kardum

9 November 2023 7	Real Madrid (Spanish Basketball Federation)	100–74	(Italian Basketball Federation) Virtus Segafredo Bologna	Madrid
20:45	Scoring by quarter: 26–27, 27–10, 15–14, 32–23
	Pts: Campazzo 18; Rebs: Tavares, Yabusele 7 Asts: Campazzo 11; PIR: Campazzo 39	Boxscore	Pts: Belinelli 15; Rebs: Shengelia 6 Asts: Pajola 7 PIR: Hackett 15	Arena: WiZink Center; Attendance: 8,693; Referees: Seffi Shemmesh, Miloš Koljenšić, Steve Bittner

14 November 2023 8	Valencia Basket (Spanish Basketball Federation)	73–76	(Spanish Basketball Federation) Real Madrid	Valencia
20:30	Scoring by quarter: 26–24, 23–19, 13–20, 11–13
	Pts: Davies 22; Rebs: Davies 4 Asts: Jović 5 PIR: Davies 20	Boxscore	Pts: Deck 17; Rebs: Tavares 7 Asts: Campazzo 5 PIR: Campazzo 23	Arena: La Fonteta; Attendance: 7,997; Referees: Sreten Radović, Jurgis Laurinavičius, Aare Halliko

16 November 2023 9	Real Madrid (Spanish Basketball Federation)	91–73	(French Federation of Basketball) AS Monaco	Madrid
20:45	Scoring by quarter: 30–20, 23–19, 27–11, 11–23
	Pts: Musa 21; Rebs: Poirier 11; Asts: three players 5 PIR: Musa 29	Boxscore	Pts: Motiejūnas 14; Rebs: Hall 8 Asts: Okobo 6 PIR: Motiejūnas 17	Arena: WiZink Center; Attendance: 8,782; Referees: Damir Javor, Sérgio Silva, Vasiliki Tsaroucha

23 November 2023 10	Real Madrid (Spanish Basketball Federation)	99–75	(German Basketball Federation) ALBA Berlin	Madrid
20:45	Scoring by quarter: 27–17, 17–16, 23–18, 32–24
	Pts: Hezonja 26; Rebs: Tavares 6 Asts: Campazzo 13; PIR: Hezonja 25	Boxscore	Pts: Procida 14; Rebs: Koumadje 8 Asts: Samar 5 PIR: Procida, Thiemann 15	Arena: WiZink Center; Attendance: 6,866; Referees: Saša Pukl, Carmelo Paternicò, Vassilis Pitsilkas

28 November 2023 6	Maccabi Playtika Tel Aviv (Israeli Basketball Association)	70–99	(Spanish Basketball Federation) Real Madrid	Belgrade (Note: From 24 October onwards, Maccabi Playtika Tel Aviv will play their home matches at the Aleksandar Nikolić Hall in Belgrade due to the inability to host matches in Israel as a result of the Gaza war.)
20:15 (CET)	Scoring by quarter: 21–36, 20–16, 15–22, 14–25
	Pts: Brown 16; Rebs: Nebo 9 Asts: Brown 9 PIR: Brown 24	Boxscore	Pts: Tavares 19; Rebs: Tavares 8 Asts: Campazzo 9 PIR: Tavares 24	Arena: Aleksandar Nikolić Hall; Attendance: 0 Referees: Matej Boltauzer, Mehdi Difallah, Ioannis Foufis
Note: The match was originally to be played on 2 November at 20:05 (21:05 IST), but was postponed due to the inability to host matches in Israel as a result of the Gaza war.

30 November 2023 11	Fenerbahçe Beko (Turkish Basketball Federation)	100–99(OT)	(Spanish Basketball Federation) Real Madrid	Istanbul
18:45	Scoring by quarter: 16–29, 21–15, 22–23, 28–20, Overtime: 13–12
	Pts: Gudurić 21; Rebs: Hayes-Davis, Gudurić 7 Asts: Gudurić 5 PIR: Gudurić 29	Boxscore	Pts: Campazzo 33; Rebs: Deck, Poirier 8 Asts: Campazzo 7 PIR: Campazzo 32	Arena: Ülker Sports and Event Hall; Attendance: 11,787; Referees: Robert Lottermoser, Miloš Koljenšić, Luka Kardum

5 December 2023 12	Olympiacos (Hellenic Basketball Federation)	71–77	(Spanish Basketball Federation) Real Madrid	Piraeus
20:15	Scoring by quarter: 19–23, 17–14, 21–24, 14–16
	Pts: Walkup 17; Rebs: Peters 7 Asts: Walkup 4 PIR: Peters 16	Boxscore	Pts: Musa 23; Rebs: Hezonja 10; Asts: Campazzo 9 PIR: Musa, Hezonja 21	Arena: Peace and Friendship Stadium; Attendance: 12,239; Referees: Ilija Belošević, Tomislav Hordov, Michele Rossi

7 December 2023 13	Panathinaikos AKTOR (Hellenic Basketball Federation)	78–90	(Spanish Basketball Federation) Real Madrid	Marousi
20:15	Scoring by quarter: 23–24, 22–22, 10–26, 23–18
	Pts: Nunn 24; Rebs: Mitoglou 9 Asts: Vildoza, Nunn 4 PIR: Lessort 20	Boxscore	Pts: Hezonja 19; Rebs: Tavares 9 Asts: Campazzo 6 PIR: Hezonja 23	Arena: OAKA Altion; Attendance: 18,005; Referees: Mehdi Difallah, Saulius Račys, Gentian Cici

14 December 2023 14	Real Madrid (Spanish Basketball Federation)	88–73	(German Basketball Federation) Bayern Munich	Madrid
20:45	Scoring by quarter: 19–23, 23–14, 21–20, 25–16
	Pts: Llull 16; Rebs: Poirier 9 Asts: Campazzo 3 PIR: Poirier 20	Boxscore	Pts: Bonga 15; Rebs: Bonga 5 Asts: Bolmaro 3 PIR: Bonga 18	Arena: WiZink Center; Attendance: 8,417; Referees: Milan Nedović, Luka Kardum, Adar Peer

19 December 2023 15	Crvena zvezda Meridianbet (Basketball Federation of Serbia)	58–72	(Spanish Basketball Federation) Real Madrid	Belgrade
19:00	Scoring by quarter: 20–20, 14–25, 11–16, 13–11
	Pts: Mitrović, Teodosić 14; Rebs: Bolomboy 10; Asts: Teodosić 5 PIR: Teodosić 18	Boxscore	Pts: Hezonja 17; Rebs: Hezonja 10; Asts: Rodríguez 8 PIR: Hezonja 19	Arena: Štark Arena; Attendance: 19,714; Referees: Emin Moğulkoç, Tomasz Trawicki, Sérgio Silva

21 December 2023 16	Real Madrid (Spanish Basketball Federation)	91–75	(Basketball Federation of Serbia) Partizan Mozzart Bet	Madrid
20:45	Scoring by quarter: 26–19, 22–17, 28–15, 15–24
	Pts: Musa 23; Rebs: Tavares 8 Asts: Rodríguez 9 PIR: Musa 27	Boxscore	Pts: Caboclo 18; Rebs: Ponitka 7 Asts: Nunnally 4 PIR: Koprivica 15	Arena: WiZink Center; Attendance: 9,563; Referees: Robert Lottermoser, Joseph Bissang, Kristaps Konstantinovs

28 December 2023 17	LDLC ASVEL (French Federation of Basketball)	76–77	(Spanish Basketball Federation) Real Madrid	Décines-Charpieu
20:00	Scoring by quarter: 19–18, 20–15, 18–18, 19–26
	Pts: Luwawu-Cabarrot 20; Rebs: Fall, Kahudi 6 Asts: Lee 7 PIR: Lee 19	Boxscore	Pts: Poirier 17; Rebs: Tavares 12; Asts: Rodríguez 6 PIR: Tavares 26	Arena: LDLC Arena; Attendance: 11,313; Referees: Piotr Pastusiak, Jurgis Laurinavičius, Hüseyin Çelik

3 January 2024 18	Barcelona (Spanish Basketball Federation)	83–78	(Spanish Basketball Federation) Real Madrid	Barcelona
20:30	Scoring by quarter: 21–25, 24–22, 15–15, 23–16
	Pts: Veselý 27; Rebs: Satoranský, Hernangómez 6 Asts: Laprovíttola 8 PIR: Veselý 28	Boxscore	Pts: Musa 19; Rebs: Tavares 7 Asts: Campazzo 8 PIR: Musa 24	Arena: Palau Blaugrana; Attendance: 7,611; Referees: Emin Moğulkoç, Mehdi Difallah, Kristaps Konstantinovs

5 January 2024 19	Real Madrid (Spanish Basketball Federation)	130–126(OT)	(Turkish Basketball Federation) Anadolu Efes	Madrid
20:45	Scoring by quarter: 25–18, 13–18, 26–25, 17–20, Overtime: 10–10, 11–11, 9–9, 19–15
	Pts: Musa 40; Rebs: Hezonja, Tavares 12; Asts: Campazzo 11; PIR: Musa 45	Boxscore	Pts: Larkin 32; Rebs: Pleiß 11; Asts: Larkin 9 PIR: Larkin 33	Arena: WiZink Center; Attendance: 8,221; Referees: Matej Boltauzer, Robert Vyklický, Sérgio Silva

9 January 2024 20	Bayern Munich (German Basketball Federation)	71–92	(Spanish Basketball Federation) Real Madrid	Munich
20:30	Scoring by quarter: 18–24, 18–21, 17–19, 18–28
	Pts: Francisco 14; Rebs: Bolmaro, Ibaka 5 Asts: three players 3 PIR: Francisco 14	Boxscore	Pts: Poirier 18; Rebs: Campazzo 7 Asts: Llull 4 PIR: Poirier 23	Arena: BMW Park; Attendance: 6,377; Referees: Sreten Radović, Saša Pukl, Seffi Shemmesh

11 January 2024 21	Real Madrid (Spanish Basketball Federation)	96–86(OT)	(Spanish Basketball Federation) Valencia Basket	Madrid
20:45	Scoring by quarter: 16–24, 19–16, 23–15, 24–27, Overtime: 14–4
	Pts: Campazzo 19; Rebs: Tavares 19; Asts: Campazzo 7 PIR: Tavares 32	Boxscore	Pts: Davies 19; Rebs: Toure 7 Asts: Jones 6 PIR: Jović 21	Arena: WiZink Center; Attendance: 8,264; Referees: Robert Lottermoser, Miloš Koljenšić, Uroš Nikolić

19 January 2024 22	AS Monaco (French Federation of Basketball)	98–74	(Spanish Basketball Federation) Real Madrid	Fontvieille
19:00	Scoring by quarter: 33–20, 23–20, 24–14, 18–20
	Pts: Loyd 19; Rebs: Hall 7 Asts: James 12; PIR: James 32	Boxscore	Pts: Musa 12; Rebs: Poirier, Yabusele 9 Asts: Causeur, Alocén 2 PIR: Musa 15	Arena: Salle Gaston Médecin; Attendance: 4,698; Referees: Oļegs Latiševs, Gytis Vilius, Sašo Petek

25 January 2024 23	Real Madrid (Spanish Basketball Federation)	90–85	(Hellenic Basketball Federation) Olympiacos	Madrid
20:45	Scoring by quarter: 30–13, 22–17, 16–25, 22–30
	Pts: Musa 20; Rebs: Poirier 9 Asts: Campazzo 9 PIR: Campazzo 21	Boxscore	Pts: Papanikolaou 25; Rebs: Sikma 10; Asts: Mitrou-Long 7 PIR: Papanikolaou 26	Arena: WiZink Center; Attendance: 10,432; Referees: Ilija Belošević, Carmelo Paternicò, Saulius Račys

30 January 2024 24	Real Madrid (Spanish Basketball Federation)	106–101	(Israeli Basketball Association) Maccabi Playtika Tel Aviv	Madrid
20:45	Scoring by quarter: 29–18, 23–27, 28–28, 26–28
	Pts: Musa 19; Rebs: Poirier 10; Asts: Campazzo, Hezonja 5 PIR: Poirier 29	Boxscore	Pts: Baldwin 28; Rebs: three players 6 Asts: Brown 9 PIR: Colson 28	Arena: WiZink Center; Attendance: 8,326; Referees: Sreten Radović, Fernando Rocha, Artūras Šukys

1 February 2024 25	Real Madrid (Spanish Basketball Federation)	86–79	(French Federation of Basketball) LDLC ASVEL	Madrid
20:45	Scoring by quarter: 24–18, 21–17, 17–15, 24–29
	Pts: Yabusele 26; Rebs: Abalde, Poirier 5 Asts: Rodríguez 9 PIR: Yabusele 33	Boxscore	Pts: Lee 23; Rebs: Scott, Fall 6 Asts: Lee 7 PIR: Lee 28	Arena: WiZink Center; Attendance: 5,984; Referees: Tomislav Hordov, Seffi Shemmesh, Leandro Lezcano

8 February 2024 26	EA7 Emporio Armani Milan (Italian Basketball Federation)	81–76	(Spanish Basketball Federation) Real Madrid	Assago
20:30	Scoring by quarter: 23–19, 25–10, 18–25, 15–22
	Pts: Shields 27; Rebs: Mirotić, Voigtmann 5 Asts: Hall, Melli 3 PIR: Mirotić, Shields 29	Boxscore	Pts: Musa 12; Rebs: Yabusele, Poirier 7 Asts: Campazzo 7 PIR: Campazzo 13	Arena: Forum; Attendance: 11,457; Referees: Matej Boltauzer, Emin Moğulkoç, Mehdi Difallah

29 February 2024 27	Real Madrid (Spanish Basketball Federation)	86–97	(Hellenic Basketball Federation) Panathinaikos AKTOR	Madrid
20:45	Scoring by quarter: 24–18, 12–27, 25–22, 25–30
	Pts: Yabusele 18; Rebs: Poirier 7 Asts: Campazzo 7 PIR: Yabusele 24	Boxscore	Pts: Lessort 26; Rebs: Mitoglou 9 Asts: Nunn 7 PIR: Lessort 33	Arena: WiZink Center; Attendance: 10,828; Referees: Matej Boltauzer, Emin Moğulkoç, Joseph Bissang

7 March 2024 28	Real Madrid (Spanish Basketball Federation)	79–89	(Turkish Basketball Federation) Fenerbahçe Beko	Madrid
20:45	Scoring by quarter: 15–20, 18–23, 25–24, 21–22
	Pts: Llull 17; Rebs: Tavares, Yabusele 6 Asts: Campazzo 5 PIR: Musa 20	Boxscore	Pts: Hayes-Davis 17; Rebs: Hayes-Davis 12; Asts: Calathes 6 PIR: Hayes-Davis 26	Arena: WiZink Center; Attendance: 10,127; Referees: Damir Javor, Mehdi Difallah, Milivoje Jovčić

15 March 2024 29	Virtus Segafredo Bologna (Italian Basketball Federation)	74–89	(Spanish Basketball Federation) Real Madrid	Bologna
20:30	Scoring by quarter: 15–23, 16–21, 21–17, 22–28
	Pts: Cordinier 12; Rebs: Cordinier 8 Asts: Belinelli 5 PIR: Cordinier 16	Boxscore	Pts: Yabusele 15; Rebs: Poirier 8 Asts: Campazzo 4 PIR: Poirier 24	Arena: Segafredo Arena; Attendance: 9,517; Referees: Robert Lottermoser, Milan Nedović, Eduard Udyanskyy

19 March 2024 30	ALBA Berlin (German Basketball Federation)	79–86	(Spanish Basketball Federation) Real Madrid	Berlin
20:00	Scoring by quarter: 26–16, 14–20, 17–22, 22–28
	Pts: Thomas 16; Rebs: Koumadje 6 Asts: Hermannsson 5 PIR: Thomas 17	Boxscore	Pts: Hezonja 22; Rebs: Hezonja 8 Asts: Campazzo 6 PIR: Hezonja 28	Arena: Mercedes-Benz Arena; Attendance: 11,240; Referees: Tomislav Hordov, Miloš Koljenšić, Sašo Petek

21 March 2024 31	Partizan Mozzart Bet (Basketball Federation of Serbia)	76–88	(Spanish Basketball Federation) Real Madrid	Belgrade
20:30	Scoring by quarter: 13–13, 18–20, 23–35, 22–20
	Pts: Kaminsky 19; Rebs: Punter 7 Asts: Nunnally, Punter 3 PIR: Nunnally 21	Boxscore	Pts: Hezonja 25; Rebs: Poirier 8 Asts: Campazzo 8 PIR: Hezonja 33	Arena: Štark Arena; Attendance: 20,200; Referees: Fernando Rocha, Jakub Zamojski, Rain Peerandi

29 March 2024 32	Real Madrid (Spanish Basketball Federation)	101–94	(Basketball Federation of Serbia) Crvena zvezda Meridianbet	Madrid
20:45	Scoring by quarter: 20–21, 24–26, 28–28, 29–19
	Pts: Musa 30; Rebs: Tavares 11; Asts: Rodríguez, Llull 6 PIR: Musa 40	Boxscore	Pts: Nedović 30; Rebs: Hanga 6 Asts: Hanga 7 PIR: Nedović 32	Arena: WiZink Center; Attendance: 9,189; Referees: Matej Boltauzer, Artūras Šukys, Maxime Boubert

5 April 2024 33	Real Madrid (Spanish Basketball Federation)	91–95	(Spanish Basketball Federation) Baskonia	Madrid
20:45	Scoring by quarter: 27–17, 21–25, 16–23, 27–30
	Pts: Hezonja 18; Rebs: Hezonja 7 Asts: Campazzo 9 PIR: Campazzo 25	Boxscore	Pts: Howard 35; Rebs: Sedekerskis 14; Asts: Miller-McIntyre 12; PIR: Howard 27	Arena: WiZink Center; Attendance: 9,484; Referees: Mehdi Difallah, Tomislav Hordov, Saulius Račys

11 April 2024 34	Žalgiris (Lithuanian Basketball Federation)	62–64	(Spanish Basketball Federation) Real Madrid	Kaunas
19:00	Scoring by quarter: 9–16, 16–15, 17–13, 20–20
	Pts: Evans, Manek 14; Rebs: Manek 7 Asts: Ulanovas 6 PIR: Evans 16	Boxscore	Pts: Musa 17; Rebs: Musa, Poirier 7 Asts: Llull 4 PIR: Musa 19	Arena: Žalgirio Arena; Attendance: 15,077; Referees: Robert Lottermoser, Uroš Nikolić, Joseph Bissang

=== EuroLeague Playoffs ===
23 April 2024 1	Real Madrid (Spain)	90–74	(Spanish Basketball Federation) Baskonia	Madrid
21:00	Scoring by quarter: 26–17, 22–20, 22–16, 20–21
	Pts: Musa 16; Rebs: three players 7 Asts: Rodríguez 6 PIR: Musa 20	Boxscore	Pts: Howard 15; Rebs: Sedekerskis 7 Asts: Miller-McIntyre 5 PIR: Costello 17	Arena: WiZink Center; Attendance: 9,632; Referees: Emin Moğulkoç, Oļegs Latiševs, Ioannis Foufis

25 April 2024 2	Real Madrid (Spain)	101–90	(Spanish Basketball Federation) Baskonia	Madrid
21:00	Scoring by quarter: 23–21, 23–19, 28–23, 27–27
	Pts: Campazzo 24; Rebs: Tavares 9 Asts: Campazzo 7 PIR: Campazzo 33	Boxscore	Pts: Marinković 20; Rebs: Miller-McIntyre, Sedekerskis 6 Asts: Miller-McIntyre 8 PIR: Marinković 24	Arena: WiZink Center; Attendance: 10,688; Referees: Fernando Rocha, Saša Pukl, Jakub Zamojski

1 May 2024 3	Baskonia (Spanish Basketball Federation)	98–102	(Spanish Basketball Federation) Real Madrid	Vitoria-Gasteiz
20:30	Scoring by quarter: 22–22, 34–30, 17–20, 25–30
	Pts: Howard 29; Rebs: Miller-McIntyre 7 Asts: Miller-McIntyre 11; PIR: Miller-McIntyre 25	Boxscore	Pts: Yabusele 23; Rebs: Tavares 13; Asts: Rodríguez 9 PIR: three players 26	Arena: Buesa Arena; Attendance: 13,440; Referees: Robert Lottermoser, Uroš Nikolić, Piotr Pastusiak

=== EuroLeague Final Four ===
24 May 2024 Semifinal	Real Madrid (Spain)	87–76	(Greece) Olympiacos	Berlin
21:00	Scoring by quarter: 28–10, 28–27, 15–21, 16–18
	Pts: Musa 20; Rebs: Hezonja 6 Asts: Campazzo 9 PIR: Musa 23	Boxscore	Pts: Peters 23; Rebs: Peters 10; Asts: Walkup 5 PIR: Peters 26	Arena: Uber Arena; Attendance: 13,578; Referees: Sreten Radović, Damir Javor, Emin Moğulkoç

26 May 2024 Final	Real Madrid (Spain)	80–95	(Greece) Panathinaikos AKTOR	Berlin
19:00	Scoring by quarter: 36–25, 18–24, 7–15, 19–31
	Pts: Musa 15; Rebs: Hezonja 8 Asts: Campazzo, Musa 4 PIR: Musa 19	Boxscore	Pts: Sloukas 24; Rebs: Grant, Lessort 6 Asts: Grant 5 PIR: Sloukas 31	Arena: Uber Arena; Attendance: 13,578; Referees: Fernando Rocha, Ilija Belošević, Mehdi Difallah

=== Copa del Rey ===
15 February 2024 Quarterfinal	Real Madrid	84–79	UCAM Murcia	Málaga
18:00	Scoring by quarter: 25–17, 19–17, 19–22, 21–23
	Pts: Campazzo 16; Rebs: Hezonja 7 Asts: Campazzo 4 PIR: Campazzo 25	Boxscore	Pts: Ennis 17; Rebs: Sant-Roos, Todorović 5 Asts: Caupain 4 PIR: Caupain, Ennis 12	Arena: Martín Carpena; Attendance: 9,736; Referees: Emilio Pérez Pizarro, Benjamín Jiménez, Alfonso Olivares

17 February 2024 Semifinal	Real Madrid	95–76	Valencia Basket	Málaga
18:00	Scoring by quarter: 23–17, 25–22, 32–16, 15–21
	Pts: Musa 18; Rebs: Poirier, Tavares 8 Asts: Campazzo 9 PIR: Poirier, Campazzo 22	Boxscore	Pts: Davies 18; Rebs: Inglis 9 Asts: Jones 4 PIR: Davies, López-Arostegui 13	Arena: Martín Carpena; Attendance: 10,900; Referees: Carlos Peruga, Carlos Cortés, Luis Miguel Castillo

18 February 2024 Final	Real Madrid	96–85	Barça	Málaga
18:30	Scoring by quarter: 19–19, 24–26, 23–18, 30–22
	Pts: Campazzo 18; Rebs: Yabusele 9 Asts: Campazzo 6 PIR: Poirier 32	Boxscore	Pts: Parker 19; Rebs: Hernangómez 8 Asts: Laprovíttola 4 PIR: Parker 17	Arena: Martín Carpena; Attendance: 10,900; Referees: Antonio Conde, Rafael Serrano, Arnau Padrós

=== Supercopa de España ===
16 September 2023 Semifinal	Barça	80–90	Real Madrid	Murcia
18:30	Scoring by quarter: 25–22, 15–20, 19–25, 21–23
	Pts: Laprovíttola 27; Rebs: Abrines 4 Asts: Laprovíttola 5 PIR: Laprovíttola 32	Boxscore	Pts: Musa 24; Rebs: Tavares 11; Asts: Campazzo 5 PIR: Tavares 28	Arena: Palacio de Deportes; Attendance: 7,400; Referees: Benjamín Jiménez, Rafael Serrano, Cristóbal Sánchez

17 September 2023 Final	Unicaja	81–88	Real Madrid	Murcia
19:00	Scoring by quarter: 17–21, 14–23, 25–17, 25–27
	Pts: Perry 17; Rebs: Kalinoski 6 Asts: Perry 4 PIR: Perry 16	Boxscore	Pts: Campazzo 19; Rebs: Tavares 11; Asts: Campazzo 5 PIR: Campazzo 23	Arena: Palacio de Deportes; Attendance: 7,400; Referees: Antonio Conde, Rafael Serrano, Javier Torres

== Statistics ==
=== Liga ACB ===
Player	GP	GS	MPG	2FG%	3FG%	FT%	RPG	APG	SPG	BPG	PPG	PIR
Fabien Causeur	35	18	14:56	63.5%	32.6%	69%	1.7	1.2	0.6	0.3	5.8	5.4
Rudy Fernández	27	0	12:58	50%	37.7%	83.3%	1.7	0.7	0.6	0.1	4	4.6
Alberto Abalde	40	21	15:41	58.1%	42.3%	90.9%	2.6	1.7	0.5	–	5.1	6
Facundo Campazzo	39	36	23:06	55.6%	40.3%	92.7%	2.3	5.6	1.6	–	11.7	17
Mario Hezonja	38	15	22	50.6%	34.2%	88%	4.4	1.4	0.8	0.1	10.6	11.2
Carlos Alocén	18	6	11:43	40%	16.7%	77.3%	1.3	1.8	0.7	0.2	3.1	3
Sergio Rodríguez	31	1	14:23	38.3%	35.7%	92.3%	1.2	3.7	0.3	–	4	4.2
Gabriel Deck	23	10	20:49	53.7%	42.3%	81%	4.1	1.5	0.6	–	8.2	9.2
Vincent Poirier	41	3	18:11	63.2%	12.5%	80.5%	5.3	0.9	0.4	1.5	8.2	13.1
Edy Tavares	35	35	22:03	74.6%	–	70.9%	7.3	0.8	0.3	1.6	9.6	17.1
Sergio Llull	36	3	16:55	46.6%	31.6%	79.2%	1.3	2.1	0.5	0.1	8.1	6.4
Guerschon Yabusele	32	19	21:05	58.6%	40.9%	80.5%	3.2	1.1	0.6	0.3	9.2	10.7
Eli Ndiaye	25	6	11:50	62.2%	38.5%	78.9%	2.4	0.3	0.2	0.6	4.2	5.4
Džanan Musa	40	35	20:47	59.9%	40.2%	82.4%	2.8	2	0.8	0.2	14.2	15.1
Ismaila Diagne	4	2	12:32	58.3%	–	75%	4.5	0.5	0.3	1	5	8.5
Hugo González	10	0	5:42	71.4%	33.3%	91.7%	0.8	0.3	0.2	–	3	2.9
TOTAL				58.3%	36.6%	82.1%	37.1	20.2	7.1	4.2	88.6	109.9

Source: ACB

=== EuroLeague ===
Player	GP	GS	MPG	2FG%	3FG%	FT%	RPG	APG	SPG	BPG	PPG	PIR
Fabien Causeur	32	18	15:13	53%	39.4%	88.9%	1.3	1.1	0.4	0.2	5.1	4.5
Rudy Fernández	24	0	15:23	50%	36.5%	85.7%	1.9	1.5	0.9	–	3.3	4.9
Alberto Abalde	24	9	12:49	50%	41.3%	87.5%	1.9	0.7	0.4	–	3.6	4
Facundo Campazzo	37	36	25:17	57.8%	32.2%	86.6%	2.9	6.5	1.3	–	11.5	16.7
Mario Hezonja	38	17	23:18	52.2%	43.1%	92.1%	4.6	0.9	1	0.1	13.5	13.3
Carlos Alocén	12	3	8:48	28.6%	9.1%	60%	1.3	1.4	0.2	0.1	1.5	1.5
Sergio Rodríguez	32	0	15:11	35.6%	35.6%	87.5%	1.4	4.2	0.5	–	4.4	4.5
Gabriel Deck	28	15	21:13	68.4%	35.8%	87.8%	3.2	1.1	0.6	–	9	9.9
Vincent Poirier	37	5	18:21	67.5%	40%	70.6%	5.3	0.6	0.4	1.5	9	13.4
Edy Tavares	34	33	22:53	60.7%	–	73.8%	6.5	1.4	0.7	1.5	9.4	14.9
Sergio Llull	33	2	18:03	42.9%	34%	72.7%	1.2	2	0.3	–	7.9	5.2
Guerschon Yabusele	27	13	23:35	65.2%	46.1%	86.8%	4.9	1	0.8	0.2	10.5	14.2
Eli Ndiaye	23	13	11:09	56.7%	32%	66.7%	2.3	0.5	0.4	0.2	2.9	3.3
Džanan Musa	38	29	21:01	61%	41.3%	81.9%	2.7	2.2	0.3	0.2	13.5	14.5
Ismaila Diagne	2	1	3:05	–	–	–	–	–	–	–	–	-2
Hugo González	6	1	4:24	100%	–	100%	0.2	0.3	–	–	0.7	-0.3
TOTAL				58%	37.8%	81.5%	36.5	20.6	6.5	3.6	88.7	107.6

Source: EuroLeague
