= Hugo González (basketball) =

Spanish basketball player (born 2006)

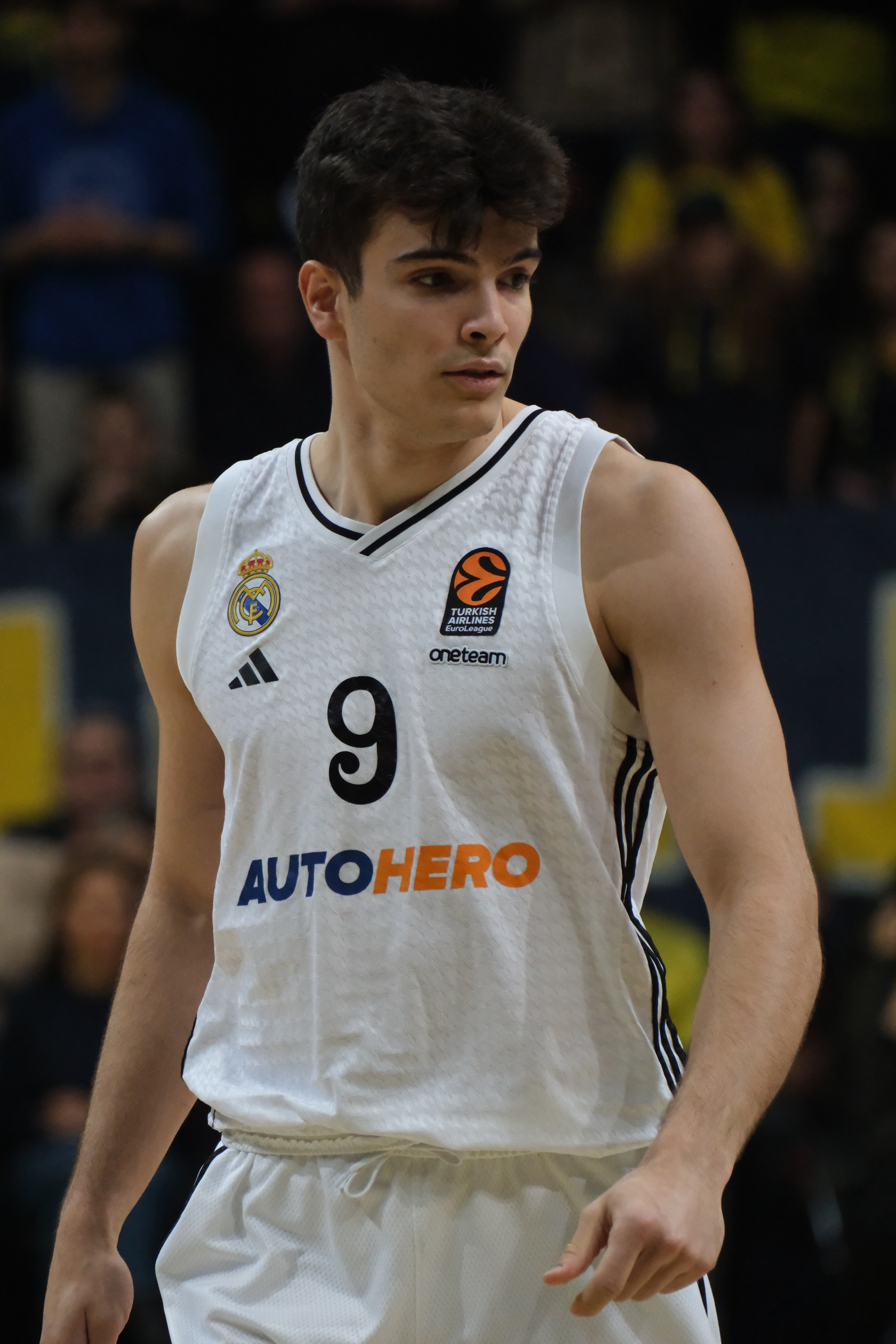
- González with Real Madrid in 2025

No. 28 – Boston Celtics
- Position: Shooting guard
- League: NBA

Personal information
- Born: 5 February 2006 (age 20) Madrid, Spain
- Listed height: 6 ft 6 in (1.98 m)
- Listed weight: 200 lb (91 kg)

Career information
- NBA draft: 2025: 1st round, 28th overall pick
- Drafted by: Boston Celtics
- Playing career: 2022–present

Career history
- 2022–2025: Real Madrid
- 2022–2024: →Real Madrid B
- 2025–present: Boston Celtics

Career highlights
- 2× Liga ACB champion (2024, 2025); All-Liga ACB Young Players Team (2025); Euroleague NGT MVP (2024)
- Stats at NBA.com
- Stats at Basketball Reference
Medals
Men's basketball
Representing Spain
FIBA U17 World Cup
Silver medal – second place	2022 Spain	Team
FIBA U18 European Championship
Silver medal – second place	2023 Serbia	Team

Hugo González Peña (born 5 February 2006) is a Spanish professional basketball player for the Boston Celtics of the National Basketball Association (NBA).

== Early life and career ==
González was born in Madrid to parents who both played professional basketball in Spain. He began playing basketball at age nine with an academy in San Agustín del Guadalix, where his father, Paco, had played near the end of his career. González spent three years with the academy before joining Real Madrid's youth system in the 2017–18 season.

González progressed through Real Madrid's academy and played for its junior and reserve teams while beginning to make appearances for the senior team. In 2023, he helped Real Madrid's under-18 team win the Euroleague Basketball Next Generation Tournament. The team retained the title in 2024, when González was named the tournament's most valuable player. He scored 23 points and recorded six assists in the championship game against U18 PFBB INSEP Paris and averaged 17.5 points, 6.5 rebounds and 3.8 assists during the tournament.

== Professional career ==
=== Real Madrid (2022–2025) ===
On 2 October 2022, González made his first-team and Liga ACB debut for Real Madrid against Monbus Obradoiro. He played three minutes and eight seconds, scoring four points and recording a PIR of five in a Real Madrid victory. At 16 years, seven months and 27 days old, he became the fourth-youngest Real Madrid player to appear in the ACB.

González became part of Real Madrid's senior rotation during the 2024–25 season and was selected to the All-Liga ACB Young Players Team. During his first-team career, he won the Spanish Super Cup in 2023, the Copa del Rey in 2024 and consecutive Liga ACB championships in 2024 and 2025. Real Madrid announced his departure from the club on 30 June 2025.

=== Boston Celtics (2025–present) ===
On 25 June 2025, González was selected by the Boston Celtics with the 28th overall pick in the 2025 NBA draft. He signed his rookie-scale contract with Boston on 1 July and subsequently joined the Celtics' roster for the 2025 NBA Summer League in Las Vegas.

González made his NBA debut on 24 October 2025 against the New York Knicks, recording six points, four rebounds, one assist and two steals in a 105–95 loss. He made his first NBA start two days later against the Detroit Pistons.

On 20 December, González recorded his first NBA double-double, finishing with 10 points, 10 rebounds, two steals and one block in a 112–96 victory over the Toronto Raptors. On 23 January 2026, he made a corner three-pointer with four-tenths of a second remaining in the first overtime period to force a second overtime against the Brooklyn Nets. Boston won the game 130–126.

On 2 March, González recorded career highs of 18 points and 16 rebounds, along with three steals and two blocks, in a 108–81 victory over the Milwaukee Bucks. He finished his rookie regular season averaging 3.9 points and 3.3 rebounds over 74 games, including three starts.

== National team career ==
=== Junior teams ===
In July 2022, González played for Spain at the 2022 FIBA Under-17 Basketball World Cup in Málaga, helping the team win the silver medal after losing the final to the United States.

In July 2023, he won a silver medal at the 2023 FIBA U18 European Championship in Niš, Serbia, where Spain lost the final to the host team. González was selected to the tournament's All-Star Five after averaging 14.3 points, 6.6 rebounds and 1.7 assists per game.

González also represented Spain at the 2024 FIBA U18 EuroBasket, averaging 20.7 points, 6.9 rebounds and 2.6 assists over seven games.

=== Senior team ===
On 20 February 2025, González made his debut for the senior Spanish national team, scoring 11 points and collecting six rebounds in an 83–66 loss to Latvia during EuroBasket 2025 qualification.

He returned to the national team for two 2027 FIBA World Cup qualifying games in July 2026, averaging 12.5 points, 3.5 rebounds and 3.5 assists. In a 109–81 victory over Denmark on 2 July, González recorded 16 points, five rebounds and five assists.

== Career statistics ==
Legend
GP	Games played	GS	Games started	MPG	Minutes per game
FG%	Field goal percentage	3P%	3-point field goal percentage	FT%	Free throw percentage
RPG	Rebounds per game	APG	Assists per game	SPG	Steals per game
BPG	Blocks per game	PPG	Points per game	**Bold**	Career high

=== NBA ===
==== Regular season ====
Year	Team	GP	GS	MPG	FG%	3P%	FT%	RPG	APG	SPG	BPG	PPG
2025–26	Boston	74	3	14.6	.476	.362	.500	3.3	.5	.6	.3	3.9
Career		74	3	14.6	.476	.362	.500	3.3	.5	.6	.3	3.9

==== Playoffs ====
Year	Team	GP	GS	MPG	FG%	3P%	FT%	RPG	APG	SPG	BPG	PPG
2026	Boston	4	0	4.8	.000	.000	.000	1.0	.5	.0	.3	.0
Career		4	0	4.8	.000	.000	.000	1.0	.5	.0	.3	.0

=== ACB ===
Regular season & playoffs

Year	Team	GP	MPG	PPG	2P%	3P%	FT%	RPG	APG	Ref.
2022–23	Real Madrid	4	2	1.5	1.000	.000	1.000	.0	.0	
2023–24	Real Madrid	10	6	3.0	.714	.333	.917	.8	.3	
2024–25	Real Madrid	36	13	4.5	.553	.250	.766	2.2	.8	
Career		50	11	4.0	.571	.262	.810	1.8	.6	

=== EuroLeague ===
Legend
GP	Games played	GS	Games started	MPG	Minutes per game
FG%	Field-goal percentage	3P%	3-point field-goal percentage	FT%	Free-throw percentage
RPG	Rebounds per game	APG	Assists per game	SPG	Steals per game
BPG	Blocks per game	PPG	Points per game	PIR	Performance index rating
**Bold**	Career high

Year	Team	GP	GS	MPG	FG%	3P%	FT%	RPG	APG	SPG	BPG	PPG	PIR
2023–24	Real Madrid	6	1	4.4	.200	.000	1.000	.2	.3	.0	.0	.7	-.3
2024–25	Real Madrid	30	1	7.6	.345	.333	.688	1.3	.3	.1	.3	1.9	1.2
Career		36	2	7.0	.333	.290	.722	1.1	.3	.1	.2	1.7	.9
