= Sidi Gueye =

Senegalese basketball player (born 2007)

Santa Clara Broncos
- Position: Power forward / center
- Conference: West Coast Conference

Personal information
- Born: 12 October 2007 (age 19) Guédiawaye, Senegal
- Listed height: 6 ft 11 in (2.11 m)
- Listed weight: 215 lb (98 kg)

Career information
- College: Arizona (2025–2026); Santa Clara (2026–present)
- Playing career: 2024–2025

Career history
- 2024–2025: Real Madrid

Career highlights
- Liga ACB champion (2025); EB Next Generation Tournament champion (2024)

El Hadji Sidi Makhtar Gueye (born 12 October 2007) is a Senegalese college basketball player for the Santa Clara Broncos of the West Coast Conference (WCC). He previously played for the Arizona Wildcats.

== Early career ==
Gueye joined Real Madrid's youth team in the summer of 2021, at the age of 13, and initially played for the U15 team (Cadete B). He subsequently progressed through several of the club's youth teams and made his debut in adult basketball on 22 October 2022, when he played for Real Madrid's B team in the fourth-tier EBA league. He played a total of three games for the B team that season, while mostly playing for the U16 team. In the 2023-24 season, he was part of the A-youth squad (Juvenil A), but was mostly in the B team squad, with which he averaged 8.3 points, 6.6 rebounds, 2 assists, and 1.2 blocks in 23 appearances. In addition, Sidi Gueye won the Euroleague Basketball Next Generation Tournament with the A-Youth team.

Gueye made his debut for Real Madrid's professional team on 20 October 2024, in a league game against Bàsquet Girona, and just four days later, he made his first EuroLeague appearance against Crvena zvezda.

== College career ==
On 30 April 2025, Gueye committed to play college basketball in the United States for the Arizona Wildcats. He played sparingly and averaged 1.3 points and 0.8 rebounds per game. Following the season he transferred to Santa Clara.
