= 2025–26 Real Madrid Baloncesto season =

Real Madrid
2025–26 season
- President: (Spain) Florentino Pérez
- Head coach: (Italy) Sergio Scariolo
- Arena: Movistar Arena
- Liga ACB: Quarter-finals
- EuroLeague: Runners-up
- Copa del Rey: Runners-up
- Supercopa de España: Runners-up
- Highest home attendance: Liga ACB: 11,736; Real Madrid 100–105 Barcelona (4 January 2026) EuroLeague: 12,156; Real Madrid 80–61 Barcelona (16 January 2026)
- Lowest home attendance: Liga ACB: 5,539; Real Madrid 87–75 Manresa (26 October 2025) EuroLeague: 0 Real Madrid 98–86 Maccabi Tel Aviv (8 January 2026); Real Madrid 92–83 Hapoel Tel Aviv (24 March 2026)
- Average home attendance: Liga ACB: 7,693; EuroLeague: 8,130
- Biggest win: Real Madrid 112–76 Girona (14 December 2025)
- Biggest defeat: Crvena zvezda 90–75 Real Madrid (17 October 2025)
Home	Away

The 2025–26 season was Real Madrid's 95th in existence, their 70th consecutive season in the top flight of Spanish basketball and 19th consecutive season in the EuroLeague.

Times up to 25 October 2025 and from 29 March 2026 are CEST (UTC+2). Times from 27 October 2024 to 30 March 2025 are CET (UTC+1).

== Players ==
=== Squad information ===
Note: Flags indicate national team eligibility at FIBA-sanctioned events. Players may hold other non-FIBA nationalities not displayed.

Real Madrid roster
Players
Coaches

Pos.	No.	Nat.	Name	Ht.	Wt.	Age
PF	0	(Canada)	Lyles, Trey	2.06 m (6 ft 9 in)	106 kg (234 lb)	31 – 5 November 1995
SG	1	(Germany)	Krämer, David	1.96 m (6 ft 5 in)	92 kg (203 lb)	29 – 14 January 1997
C	5	(Mali)	Sissoko, Mady	2.06 m (6 ft 9 in)	113 kg (249 lb)	25 – 20 December 2000
G/F	6	(Spain)	Abalde, Alberto	2.02 m (6 ft 8 in)	95 kg (209 lb)	30 – 15 December 1995
PG	7	(Argentina)	Campazzo, Facundo	1.78 m (5 ft 10 in)	84 kg (185 lb)	35 – 23 March 1991
PF	8	(United States)	Okeke, Chuma	2.01 m (6 ft 7 in)	104 kg (229 lb)	28 – 18 August 1998
G/F	9	(Italy)	Procida, Gabriele	1.98 m (6 ft 6 in)	88 kg (194 lb)	24 – 1 June 2002
F	11	(Croatia)	Hezonja, Mario	2.06 m (6 ft 9 in)	110 kg (243 lb)	31 – 25 February 1995
G	12	(France)	Maledon, Théo	1.93 m (6 ft 4 in)	79 kg (174 lb)	25 – 12 June 2001
F/C	13	(Spain)	Almansa, Izan	2.08 m (6 ft 10 in)	104 kg (229 lb)	21 – 7 June 2005
F	14	(Argentina)	Deck, Gabriel	1.98 m (6 ft 6 in)	105 kg (231 lb)	31 – 8 February 1995
F/C	16	(Spain)	Garuba, Usman	2.03 m (6 ft 8 in)	115 kg (254 lb)	24 – 9 March 2002
C	22	(Cape Verde)	Tavares, Edy (injured)	2.20 m (7 ft 3 in)	125 kg (276 lb)	34 – 22 March 1992
G	23	(Spain)	Llull, Sergio (C)	1.90 m (6 ft 3 in)	94 kg (207 lb)	38 – 15 November 1987
PG	24	(Dominican Republic)	Feliz, Andrés	1.86 m (6 ft 1 in)	92 kg (203 lb)	29 – 15 July 1997
C	25	(Ukraine)	Len, Alex (injured)	2.13 m (7 ft 0 in)	113 kg (249 lb)	33 – 16 June 1993
C	77	(Turkey)	Yurtseven, Ömer	2.13 m (7 ft 0 in)	125 kg (276 lb)	28 – 19 June 1998

Head coach

- (Italy) Sergio Scariolo

Assistant coach(es)

- (Spain) Luis Guil
- (Spain) Isidoro Calín
- (Montenegro) Stefan Ivanović
- (Italy) Matteo Cassinerio
- (Spain) Piti Hurtado
- (Spain) David Jimeno

Athletic trainer(s)

- (Spain) Juan Trapero

Legend

- (C) Team captain
- Injured

- Roster
Updated: May 2, 2026

=== Depth chart ===
Pos.	Starting 5	Bench 1	Bench 2	Bench 3	Inactive
C	Mady Sissoko	Ömer Yurtseven	Izan Almansa ‡	Alex Len (injured)	Edy Tavares † (injured)
PF	Gabriel Deck	Trey Lyles *	Chuma Okeke *		Usman Garuba † (injured)
SF	Mario Hezonja †	Gabriele Procida
SG	Alberto Abalde †	Sergio Llull †	David Krämer
PG	Facundo Campazzo	Théo Maledon	Andrés Feliz

Notes: Blue † – homegrown player; (Note: A homegrown player is a player that played for at least three years before the age of 20 on a Spanish team. In Liga ACB, the team must register at least four homegrown players in rosters of 10–12 players or at least three homegrown players in rosters of 8–9 players. In EuroLeague, the team did not have any limitations regarding the number of homegrown players.) Red * – overseas player; (Note: An overseas player is a player from outside EEA, FIBA Europe or ACP states. In Liga ACB, the team may register at most two overseas players. In EuroLeague, the team did not have any limitations regarding the number of overseas players.) Green ‡ – youth player (Note: In Liga ACB, the team may register under-22 players linked to the youth system. In EuroLeague, the team may register under-20 players linked to the youth system.)

=== Transactions ===
==== In ====
No.	Pos.	Nat.	Name	Age	Moving from		Type	Ends	Transfer fee	Date	Source
0	PF	(Canada) (United States)	Trey Lyles	31	Sacramento Kings	(United States)	Transfer	June 2026	Free	10 September 2025	
1	SG	(Germany) (Slovakia)	David Krämer	29	Tenerife	(Spain)	Transfer	June 2026	Undisclosed	11 July 2025	
5	C	(Mali)	Mady Sissoko	25	Trieste	(Italy)	Transfer	June 2026	Undisclosed	1 June 2026	
8	PF	(United States)	Chuma Okeke	28	Cleveland Cavaliers	(United States)	Transfer	June 2027	Free	30 July 2025	
9	G/F	(Italy)	Gabriele Procida	24	ALBA Berlin	(Germany)	Transfer	June 2028	Free	25 July 2025	
12	G	(France)	Théo Maledon	25	ASVEL	(France)	Transfer	June 2027	Free	7 July 2025	
13	F/C	(Spain)	Izan Almansa	21	Perth Wildcats	(Australia)	Transfer	June 2029	Undisclosed	27 August 2025	
25	C	(Ukraine)	Alex Len	33	Los Angeles Lakers	(United States)	Transfer	June 2027	Free	30 October 2025	
77	C	(Turkey)	Ömer Yurtseven	28	Golden State Warriors	(United States)	Transfer	June 2026	Free	16 May 2026	

==== Out ====
No.	Pos.	Nat.	Name	Age	Moving to		Type	Transfer fee	Date	Source
8	G	(Canada)	Xavier Rathan-Mayes	32	Bayern Munich	(Germany)	Released	Free	25 July 2025	
9	SF	(Spain)	Hugo González	20	Boston Celtics	(United States)	Transfer	Undisclosed	30 June 2025	
13	G/F	(Bosnia and Herzegovina)	Džanan Musa	27	Dubai Basketball	(United Arab Emirates)	End of contract	Free	7 July 2025	
18	F/C	(Spain) (Republic of the Congo)	Serge Ibaka	37			End of contract	Free	2 July 2025	
20	C	(Angola)	Bruno Fernando	28	Partizan	(Serbia)	Released	Free	2 July 2025	
30	PF	(Spain) (Senegal)	Eli Ndiaye	22	Atlanta Hawks	(United States)	End of contract	Free	2 July 2025	

== Pre-season and friendlies ==
=== Friendly matches ===
6 September 2025 Trofeo Costa del Sol	ALBA Berlin (German Basketball Federation)	65–90	(Spanish Basketball Federation) Real Madrid	Málaga
20:00	Scoring by quarter: 12–27, 24–25, 18–23, 11–15
	Pts: Kayil, Griesel 12	Report	Pts: Campazzo 16	Arena: Palacio San Miguel

7 September 2025 Trofeo Costa del Sol	Unicaja	82–89	Real Madrid	Málaga
18:00	Scoring by quarter: 28–15, 12–23, 29–20, 13–31
	Pts: Duarte, Kalinoski 14	Report	Pts: Llull 22	Arena: Martín Carpena

13 September 2025	Casademont Zaragoza	64–94	Real Madrid	Segovia
19:00	Scoring by quarter: 8–17, 19–26, 12–21, 25–30
	Pts: González 10	Report	Pts: Campazzo 18	Arena: Pabellón Pedro Delgado

19 September 2025 Torneo EncestaRías	Río Breogán	83–78(OT)	Real Madrid	Pontevedra
21:15	Scoring by quarter: 16–21, 13–20, 14–15, 26–13, Overtime: 14–9
	Pts: Aranitović 15	Report	Pts: Lyles, Okeke 14	Arena: Municipal de Deportes

20 September 2025 Torneo EncestaRías	Real Madrid	87–80	Baskonia	Pontevedra
18:00	Scoring by quarter: 16–19, 24–19, 28–21, 19–21
	Pts: Feliz, Procida 14	Report	Pts: Frisch 20	Arena: Municipal de Deportes

== Competitions ==
=== Overview ===
Competition	First match	Last match	Starting round	Final position	Record							
Competition	First match	Last match	Starting round	Final position	Pld	W	D	L	PF	PA	PD	Win %
Liga ACB	5 October 2025	6 June 2026	Round 1	Quarter-finals	37	27		10	3,470	3,194	+276	72.97
EuroLeague	30 September 2025	24 May 2026	Round 1	Runners-up	44	28		16	3,876	3,652	+224	63.64
Copa del Rey	19 February 2026	22 February 2026	Quarter-finals	Runners-up	3	2		1	297	276	+21	66.67
Supercopa de España	27 September 2025	28 September 2025	Semi-finals	Runners-up	2	1		1	166	169	−3	50.00
Total					86	58	0	28	7,809	7,291	+518	67.44

Source: Competitions

=== Liga ACB ===
==== League table ====
Pos	Team	Pld	W	L	PF	PA	PD	Qualification or relegation
1	Real Madrid	34	26	8	3160	2906	+254	Qualification to playoffs
2	Valencia Basket	34	25 (Note: Head–to–head record: Valencia Basket 2–2 (+14), Kosner Baskonia 2–2 (+2), UCAM Murcia 2–2 (−16).)	9	3218	2829	+389	Qualification to playoffs
3	Kosner Baskonia	34	25	9	3177	2950	+227	Qualification to playoffs
4	UCAM Murcia	34	25	9	3113	2876	+237	Qualification to playoffs
5	Barça	34	24	10	3046	2815	+231	Qualification to playoffs

Source: ACB
Rules for classification: 1) Win–loss record; 2) Head–to–head record; 3) Head–to–head point difference; 4) Point difference; 5) Points scored; 6) Sum of quotients of points scored (Note: Head–to–head record is used only after all the matches between the teams in question have been played)

==== Results summary ====
Overall						Home					Away				
Pld	W	L	PF	PA	PD	W	L	PF	PA	PD	W	L	PF	PA	PD
34	26	8	3160	2906	+254	12	5	1604	1459	+145	14	3	1556	1447	+109

Source: Competitive matches

==== Results by round ====
Round	1	2	3	4	5	6	7	8	9	10	11	12	13	14	15	16	17	18	19	20	21	22	23	24	25	26	27	28	29	30	31	32	33	34
Ground	H	A	H	H	A	A	H	A	A	H	A	H	A	H	A	H	A	H	H	A	A	H	A	A	H	A	H	A	H	H	A	H	H	A
Result	W	L	W	W	W	W	W	W	W	W	W	W	W	L	W	W	W	W	W	W	W	W	W	W	W	W	L	W	W	L	L	L	L	L
Position	9	9	6	5	5	4	2	2	2	1	1	1	1	1	1	1	1	1	1	1	1	1	1	1	1	1	1	1	1	1	1	1	1	1

Source: Competitive matches
A = Away; H = Home; W = Win; L = Loss; R = Rest

==== Matches ====
5 October 2025 1	Real Madrid	81–71	Dreamland Gran Canaria	Madrid
12:30	Scoring by quarter: 22–18, 22–15, 27–23, 10–15
	Pts: Hezonja 13; Rebs: Tavares 5 Asts: Campazzo 9 PIR: Tavares 15	Boxscore	Pts: Labeyrie 13; Rebs: Salvó 7 Asts: Angola 6 PIR: Pelos 16	Arena: Movistar Arena; Attendance: 6,832; Referees: Fernando Calatrava, Jorge Martínez, Vicente Martínez

12 October 2025 2	Baskonia	105–100	Real Madrid	Vitoria-Gasteiz
19:00	Scoring by quarter: 18–34, 31–24, 28–23, 28–19
	Pts: Forrest 26; Rebs: Nowell 5 Asts: Forrest 7 PIR: Forrest 43	Boxscore	Pts: Lyles 24; Rebs: Fernando 6 Asts: Campazzo 7 PIR: Lyles 30	Arena: Buesa Arena; Attendance: 11,046; Referees: Carlos Peruga, Carlos Cortés, Iyán González

19 October 2025 3	Real Madrid	90–80	Recoletas Salud San Pablo Burgos	Madrid
12:30	Scoring by quarter: 25–20, 16–26, 27–22, 22–12
	Pts: Hezonja 17; Rebs: Almansa 7 Asts: Hezonja 5 PIR: Hezonja 21	Boxscore	Pts: Samuels 16; Rebs: De Sousa 8 Asts: Jackson 7 PIR: Jackson 22	Arena: Movistar Arena; Attendance: 6,473; Referees: Óscar Perea, Alberto Baena, Esperanza Mendoza

26 October 2025 4	Real Madrid	87–75	Baxi Manresa	Madrid
19:00	Scoring by quarter: 21–17, 21–18, 23–20, 22–20
	Pts: Tavares 16; Rebs: Tavares 14; Asts: Maledon 4 PIR: Tavares 39	Boxscore	Pts: Golden 18; Rebs: three players 5 Asts: Pérez 7 PIR: Golden 18	Arena: Movistar Arena; Attendance: 5,539; Referees: Emilio Pérez Pizarro, Luis Miguel Castillo, Yasmina Alcaraz

2 November 2025 5	Casademont Zaragoza	83–95	Real Madrid	Zaragoza
12:30	Scoring by quarter: 20–27, 25–21, 23–25, 15–22
	Pts: Yusta 30; Rebs: Dubljević 9 Asts: three players 2 PIR: Yusta 31	Boxscore	Pts: Tavares 16; Rebs: Lyles 9 Asts: Maledon 7 PIR: Tavares 27	Arena: Pabellón Príncipe Felipe; Attendance: 7,588; Referees: Fernando Calatrava, Sergio Manuel, Rubén Sánchez Mohedas

9 November 2025 6	Joventut	75–80	Real Madrid	Badalona
19:00	Scoring by quarter: 17–16, 18–21, 20–26, 20–17
	Pts: Rubio 18; Rebs: Tomić 7 Asts: Rubio, Tomić 3 PIR: Tomić 26	Boxscore	Pts: Len 12; Rebs: Lyles 9 Asts: three players 4 PIR: Lyles 16	Arena: Palau Municipal d'Esports; Attendance: 11,372; Referees: Jordi Aliaga, Alfonso Olivares, Igor Esteve

16 November 2025 7	Real Madrid	82–70	Surne Bilbao	Madrid
17:00	Scoring by quarter: 23–16, 16–27, 24–19, 19–8
	Pts: Maledon 17; Rebs: Tavares 8 Asts: Campazzo 4 PIR: Maledon 23	Boxscore	Pts: Pantzar 14; Rebs: Hlinason 8 Asts: Frey 5 PIR: Pantzar 16	Arena: Movistar Arena; Attendance: 7,125; Referees: Martín Caballero, Roberto Lucas, Guillermo Ríos

22 November 2025 8	Coviran Granada	100–111	Real Madrid	Granada
19:00	Scoring by quarter: 29–31, 19–25, 31–22, 21–33
	Pts: Thomas, Costa 17; Rebs: Božić 7 Asts: Costa 7 PIR: Costa 20	Boxscore	Pts: Hezonja 20; Rebs: Okeke 6 Asts: Maledon 10; PIR: Maledon 26	Arena: Palacio de Deportes; Attendance: 7,727; Referees: Arnau Padrós, Joaquín García, Cristóbal Sánchez

7 December 2025 9	La Laguna Tenerife	70–71	Real Madrid	San Cristóbal de La Laguna
13:00	Scoring by quarter: 16–18, 9–15, 23–16, 22–22
	Pts: Van Beck 15; Rebs: Fitipaldo 4 Asts: Fitipaldo 4 PIR: Van Beck 17	Boxscore	Pts: Hezonja 17; Rebs: Tavares 7 Asts: Campazzo 3 PIR: Llull 14	Arena: Santiago Martín; Attendance: 5,100; Referees: Emilio Pérez Pizarro, David Sánchez, Óscar Perea

14 December 2025 10	Real Madrid	112–76	Bàsquet Girona	Madrid
17:00	Scoring by quarter: 28–22, 31–27, 27–16, 26–11
	Pts: Lyles 16; Rebs: Len 7 Asts: Campazzo 7 PIR: three players 19	Boxscore	Pts: Marić 12; Rebs: Marić 7 Asts: Needham 4 PIR: Marić 15	Arena: Movistar Arena; Attendance: 6,807; Referees: Carlos Peruga, Alberto Baena, Fabio Fernández

20 December 2025 11	Hiopos Lleida	81–88	Real Madrid	Lleida
19:00	Scoring by quarter: 19–28, 24–18, 24–20, 14–22
	Pts: Golomán 15; Rebs: Golomán 8 Asts: Paulí 5 PIR: Golomán 19	Boxscore	Pts: Hezonja 22; Rebs: Tavares 8 Asts: Campazzo 4 PIR: Hezonja 23	Arena: Espai Fruita Barris Nord; Attendance: 5,629; Referees: Sergio Manuel, Juan de Dios Oyón, Vicente Martínez

28 December 2025 12	Real Madrid	91–82	Unicaja	Madrid
19:00	Scoring by quarter: 27–30, 19–24, 25–12, 20–16
	Pts: Hezonja 19; Rebs: Tavares 9 Asts: Feliz 4 PIR: Hezonja 20	Boxscore	Pts: Balcerowski 17; Rebs: Barreiro 6 Asts: Díaz 6 PIR: Balcerowski 20	Arena: Movistar Arena; Attendance: 9,783; Referees: Jordi Aliaga, Francisco Araña, Esperanza Mendoza

30 December 2025 13	UCAM Murcia	80–91	Real Madrid	Murcia
21:00	Scoring by quarter: 18–22, 14–19, 23–26, 25–24
	Pts: Forrest 13; Rebs: Cățe 8 Asts: Sant-Roos 5 PIR: Cacok 17	Boxscore	Pts: Campazzo 15; Rebs: Len 6 Asts: Llull 4 PIR: Campazzo 22	Arena: Palacio de Deportes; Attendance: 7,500; Referees: Óscar Perea, Jorge Martínez, Carlos Merino

4 January 2026 14	Real Madrid	100–105	Barça	Madrid
12:30	Scoring by quarter: 24–28, 20–20, 31–29, 25–28
	Pts: Hezonja 27; Rebs: Hezonja 4 Asts: Llull 8 PIR: Hezonja 30	Boxscore	Pts: Laprovíttola, Punter 19; Rebs: Hernangómez 10; Asts: Laprovíttola 9 PIR: Laprovíttola 27	Arena: Movistar Arena; Attendance: 11,736; Referees: Carlos Peruga, Carlos Cortés, Alberto Sánchez Sixto

11 January 2026 15	MoraBanc Andorra	85–90	Real Madrid	Andorra la Vella
18:00	Scoring by quarter: 21–13, 20–27, 17–21, 27–29
	Pts: Castañeda 21; Rebs: Okoye 6 Asts: Evans, Kuric 3 PIR: Pustovyi, Castañeda 16	Boxscore	Pts: Hezonja 14; Rebs: Tavares 7 Asts: Llull, Maledon 4 PIR: Tavares 20	Arena: Pavelló Toni Martí; Attendance: 3,922; Referees: Antonio Conde, Juan de Dios Oyón, Yasmina Alcaraz

18 January 2026 16	Real Madrid	94–79	Valencia Basket	Madrid
19:00	Scoring by quarter: 9–24, 34–19, 33–17, 18–19
	Pts: Hezonja 23; Rebs: Tavares, Deck 7 Asts: Campazzo 5 PIR: Hezonja 23	Boxscore	Pts: Thompson 19; Rebs: Pradilla 6 Asts: Moore 5 PIR: Thompson 20	Arena: Movistar Arena; Attendance: 10,852; Referees: Fernando Calatrava, Arnau Padrós, Igor Esteve

24 January 2026 17	Río Breogán	85–103	Real Madrid	Lugo
19:00	Scoring by quarter: 19–19, 24–24, 22–27, 20–33
	Pts: Mavra 17; Rebs: Dibba, Mavra 5 Asts: Russell 6 PIR: Mavra 18	Boxscore	Pts: Hezonja 28; Rebs: three players 6 Asts: Llull, Campazzo 6 PIR: Hezonja 30	Arena: Pazo dos Deportes; Attendance: 5,310; Referees: Martín Caballero, Alberto Sánchez Sixto, Raúl Zamorano

1 February 2026 18	Real Madrid	99–78	Casademont Zaragoza	Madrid
17:00	Scoring by quarter: 21–22, 24–19, 20–14, 34–23
	Pts: Procida 18; Rebs: Len 7 Asts: Campazzo 6 PIR: Procida 24	Boxscore	Pts: Robinson 19; Rebs: Robinson 9 Asts: Spissu 11; PIR: Robinson 24	Arena: Movistar Arena; Attendance: 8,175; Referees: Rafael Serrano, Iyán González, David Sánchez

8 February 2026 19	Real Madrid	94–79	Coviran Granada	Madrid
17:00	Scoring by quarter: 24–19, 16–17, 30–18, 24–25
	Pts: Krämer 22; Rebs: Lyles 6 Asts: Llull 7 PIR: Krämer 19	Boxscore	Pts: Božić 19; Rebs: Alibegović 11; Asts: Rousselle 5 PIR: Božić 25	Arena: Movistar Arena; Attendance: 7,586; Referees: Francisco Araña, Javier Torres, Vicente Martínez

15 February 2026 20	Unicaja	92–96	Real Madrid	Málaga
19:00	Scoring by quarter: 25–20, 31–19, 25–34, 11–23
	Pts: Sulejmanović 18; Rebs: Đedović 4 Asts: Perry 5 PIR: Sulejmanović 19	Boxscore	Pts: Hezonja 26; Rebs: Hezonja 9 Asts: Feliz, Llull 4 PIR: Hezonja 35	Arena: Martín Carpena; Attendance: 10,681; Referees: Emilio Pérez Pizarro, Juan de Dios Oyón, Carlos Merino

8 March 2026 21	Dreamland Gran Canaria	80–82	Real Madrid	Las Palmas
19:00	Scoring by quarter: 25–20, 13–26, 18–16, 24–20
	Pts: Tobey 22; Rebs: four players 4 Asts: Brussino 7 PIR: Tobey 21	Boxscore	Pts: Campazzo 18; Rebs: Campazzo 5 Asts: four players 3 PIR: Campazzo 24	Arena: Gran Canaria Arena; Attendance: 7,376; Referees: Alfonso Olivares, Jorge Martínez, Igor Esteve

15 March 2026 22	Real Madrid	95–78	Hiopos Lleida	Madrid
17:00	Scoring by quarter: 16–17, 31–9, 28–27, 20–25
	Pts: Maledon 18; Rebs: Lyles 11; Asts: Campazzo 5 PIR: Okeke, Maledon 20	Boxscore	Pts: Golomán 19; Rebs: three players 5 Asts: Agada, Batemon 4 PIR: Golomán 19	Arena: Movistar Arena; Attendance: 7,596; Referees: Luis Miguel Castillo, Alberto Sánchez Sixto, Rubén Sánchez Mohedas

22 March 2026 23	Barça	76–95	Real Madrid	Barcelona
19:00	Scoring by quarter: 18–15, 15–36, 20–20, 23–24
	Pts: Veselý 15; Rebs: Parra, Clyburn 4 Asts: Satoranský 4 PIR: Clyburn 16	Boxscore	Pts: Campazzo 15; Rebs: Tavares 7 Asts: Campazzo 5 PIR: Campazzo 20	Arena: Palau Blaugrana; Attendance: 7,032; Referees: Antonio Conde, Rafael Serrano, Joaquín García

28 March 2026 24	Bàsquet Girona	93–95	Real Madrid	Girona
21:00	Scoring by quarter: 13–22, 23–15, 24–29, 33–29
	Pts: Livingston 24; Rebs: Busquets 10; Asts: Livingston 5 PIR: Livingston 25	Boxscore	Pts: Hezonja 19; Rebs: Feliz 7 Asts: three players 4 PIR: Feliz 24	Arena: Fontajau; Attendance: 5,532; Referees: Alfonso Olivares, Francisco Araña, Carlos Merino

5 April 2026 25	Real Madrid	97–90	MoraBanc Andorra	Madrid
17:00	Scoring by quarter: 18–30, 29–17, 28–13, 22–30
	Pts: Len 17; Rebs: three players 5 Asts: Hezonja, Feliz 6 PIR: Len 24	Boxscore	Pts: Pons 20; Rebs: Ortega 6 Asts: Evans 9 PIR: Pons 19	Arena: Movistar Arena; Attendance: 6,438; Referees: Óscar Perea, Jordi Aliaga, Iyán González

12 April 2026 26	Recoletas Salud San Pablo Burgos	78–94	Real Madrid	Burgos
19:00	Scoring by quarter: 20–25, 19–18, 18–23, 21–28
	Pts: Meindl 18; Rebs: Meindl 6 Asts: Neto 3 PIR: Meindl 16	Boxscore	Pts: Hezonja 20; Rebs: Len 10; Asts: Maledon, Campazzo 5 PIR: Hezonja 22	Arena: Coliseum Burgos; Attendance: 9,073; Referees: Emilio Pérez Pizarro, Juan de Dios Oyón, Ariadna Chueca

19 April 2026 27	Real Madrid	90–95	La Laguna Tenerife	Madrid
19:00	Scoring by quarter: 21–26, 20–19, 19–23, 30–27
	Pts: Feliz, Tavares 18; Rebs: Tavares 7 Asts: Campazzo, Maledon 3 PIR: Tavares 32	Boxscore	Pts: Huertas 25; Rebs: Giedraitis, Shermadini 6 Asts: Huertas 6 PIR: Huertas 25	Arena: Movistar Arena; Attendance: 8,207; Referees: Luis Miguel Castillo, Arnau Padrós, Guillermo Ríos

26 April 2026 28	Valencia Basket	82–96	Real Madrid	Valencia
19:00	Scoring by quarter: 19–22, 22–23, 22–30, 19–21
	Pts: Taylor, Montero 16; Rebs: Taylor 6 Asts: Montero 9 PIR: Montero 29	Boxscore	Pts: Tavares 18; Rebs: Tavares 12; Asts: Campazzo 6 PIR: Tavares 31	Arena: Roig Arena; Attendance: 15,068; Referees: Carlos Peruga, Alberto Sánchez Sixto, Andrés Fernández

3 May 2026 29	Real Madrid	131–123(OT)	UCAM Murcia	Madrid
12:00	Scoring by quarter: 25–29, 25–34, 31–29, 33–22, Overtime: 17–9
	Pts: Hezonja 40; Rebs: Hezonja 11; Asts: Hezonja 6 PIR: Hezonja 53	Boxscore	Pts: DeJulius 27; Rebs: Cacok 7 Asts: DeJulius 12; PIR: DeJulius 39	Arena: Movistar Arena; Attendance: 6,219; Referees: Emilio Pérez Pizarro, Alfonso Olivares, Cristóbal Sánchez

10 May 2026 30	Real Madrid	97–101	Río Breogán	Madrid
17:00	Scoring by quarter: 18–15, 28–28, 21–28, 30–30
	Pts: Llull 20; Rebs: Len 9 Asts: Maledon, Llull 4 PIR: Len 26	Boxscore	Pts: Aranitović 19; Rebs: Andrić, Cook 5 Asts: Russell 6 PIR: Aranitović 22	Arena: Movistar Arena; Attendance: 6,010; Referees: Carlos Cortés, Raúl Zamorano, Ariadna Chueca

14 May 2026 31	Surne Bilbao	88–82	Real Madrid	Bilbao
20:00	Scoring by quarter: 24–22, 16–22, 20–22, 28–16
	Pts: Hlinason 22; Rebs: Hlinason 7 Asts: Hilliard 6 PIR: Hlinason, Hilliard 29	Boxscore	Pts: Lyles 19; Rebs: Lyles 8 Asts: Campazzo 7 PIR: Lyles 22	Arena: Bilbao Arena; Attendance: 8,791; Referees: Fernando Calatrava, Alberto Baena, David Sánchez

17 May 2026 32	Real Madrid	81–89	Asisa Joventut	Madrid
12:30	Scoring by quarter: 20–15, 20–23, 22–21, 19–30
	Pts: Hezonja 13; Rebs: Deck 6 Asts: Campazzo, Maledon 5 PIR: Okeke, Maledon 14	Boxscore	Pts: Rubio 21; Rebs: Parker 9 Asts: Hanga 5 PIR: Rubio 27	Arena: Movistar Arena; Attendance: 7,377; Referees: Martín Caballero, Arnau Padrós, Andrés Fernández

24 May 2026 33	Real Madrid	83–88	Kosner Baskonia	Madrid
21:00	Scoring by quarter: 29–26, 17–16, 20–22, 17–24
	Pts: Hezonja 21; Rebs: Hezonja 7 Asts: Campazzo 5 PIR: Hezonja 27	Boxscore	Pts: Luwawu-Cabarrot 21; Rebs: Forrest 6 Asts: three players 3 PIR: Luwawu-Cabarrot, Forrest 21	Arena: Movistar Arena; Attendance: 6,545; Referees: Carlos Peruga, Francisco Araña, Iyán González

29 May 2026 34	Baxi Manresa	94–87	Real Madrid	Manresa
18:00	Scoring by quarter: 26–19, 30–29, 18–25, 20–14
	Pts: Ubal 16; Rebs: Oriola 12; Asts: Pérez 8 PIR: Oriola 22	Boxscore	Pts: Hezonja 32; Rebs: Maledon 8 Asts: Feliz 6 PIR: Hezonja 24	Arena: Nou Congost; Attendance: 4,920; Referees: Alfonso Olivares, Javier Torres, Ariadna Chueca

=== ACB Playoffs ===
==== Quarterfinals ====
2 June 2026 1	Real Madrid	97–98	La Laguna Tenerife	Madrid
19:00	Scoring by quarter: 26–21, 24–27, 25–23, 22–27
	Pts: Lyles 15; Rebs: Deck 7 Asts: three players 3 PIR: Feliz 18	Boxscore	Pts: Fernández, Van Beck 17; Rebs: Abromaitis 5 Asts: Huertas 9 PIR: Fernández 18	Arena: Movistar Arena; Attendance: 7,827; Referees: Emilio Pérez Pizarro, Sergio Manuel, Igor Esteve

4 June 2026 2	La Laguna Tenerife	83–118	Real Madrid	San Cristóbal de La Laguna
21:00	Scoring by quarter: 24–21, 21–30, 20–34, 18–33
	Pts: Mills 21; Rebs: Scrubb 6 Asts: Huertas 3 PIR: Mills 19	Boxscore	Pts: Hezonja 20; Rebs: Hezonja, Sissoko 7 Asts: Campazzo 8 PIR: Hezonja 30	Arena: Santiago Martín; Attendance: 5,100; Referees: Óscar Perea, Alberto Sánchez Sixto, Vicente Martínez

6 June 2026 3	Real Madrid	95–107	La Laguna Tenerife	Madrid
18:00	Scoring by quarter: 24–23, 21–26, 28–21, 22–37
	Pts: Hezonja 22; Rebs: Lyles 11; Asts: Maledon 4 PIR: Hezonja 21	Boxscore	Pts: Mills 29; Rebs: Yebo 7 Asts: Fernández 6 PIR: Yebo 28	Arena: Movistar Arena; Attendance: 9,034; Referees: Antonio Conde, Fernando Calatrava, Joaquín García

=== EuroLeague ===
==== League table ====
Pos	Team	Pld	W	L	PF	PA	PD	Qualification
1	(Hellenic Basketball Federation) Olympiacos	38	26	12	3406	3144	+262	Qualification to playoffs
2	(Spanish Basketball Federation) Valencia Basket	38	25	13	3418	3243	+175	Qualification to playoffs
3	(Spanish Basketball Federation) Real Madrid	38	24	14	3342	3156	+186	Qualification to playoffs
4	(Turkish Basketball Federation) Fenerbahçe Beko	38	24	14	3114	3061	+53	Qualification to playoffs
5	(Lithuanian Basketball Federation) Žalgiris	38	23	15	3304	3125	+179	Qualification to playoffs

Source: EuroLeague
Rules for classification: Regular season tiebreakers

==== Results summary ====
Overall						Home					Away				
Pld	W	L	PF	PA	PD	W	L	PF	PA	PD	W	L	PF	PA	PD
38	24	14	3342	3156	+186	18	1	1756	1520	+236	6	13	1586	1636	−50

Last updated: 16 April 2026.
Source: Competitive matches

==== Results by round ====
Round	1	2	3	4	5	6	7	8	9	10	11	12	13	14	15	16	17	18	19	20	21	22	23	24	25	26	27	28	29	30	31	32	33	34	35	36	37	38
Ground	A	H	H	H	A	A	A	H	A	A	H	H	A	A	H	A	H	A	H	A	H	H	H	H	A	A	A	A	H	H	H	A	H	H	A	A	A	H
Result	L	W	W	W	L	L	L	W	W	L	L	W	W	W	W	L	W	L	W	W	W	W	W	W	L	L	L	W	W	W	W	L	W	W	L	L	W	W
Position	14	7	3	2	7	10	11	9	6	9	11	10	10	10	9	9	9	10	10	6	6	5	5	3	5	4	6	4	4	4	3	4	3	3	3	5	3	3

Source: Competitive matches
A = Away; H = Home; W = Win; L = Loss; P = Postponed

==== Matches ====
30 September 2025 1	Virtus Bologna (Italian Basketball Federation)	74–68	(Spanish Basketball Federation) Real Madrid	Bologna
20:45	Scoring by quarter: 14–19, 24–16, 17–15, 19–18
	Pts: Edwards 14; Rebs: Smailagić, Niang 4 Asts: Niang 3 PIR: Niang 16	Boxscore	Pts: Hezonja 14; Rebs: Okeke 7 Asts: Campazzo 5 PIR: Campazzo, Deck 13	Arena: PalaDozza; Attendance: 5,471; Referees: Mehdi Difallah, Gytis Vilius, Steve Bittner

2 October 2025 2	Real Madrid (Spanish Basketball Federation)	89–77	(Hellenic Basketball Federation) Olympiacos	Madrid
20:45	Scoring by quarter: 19–29, 28–24, 17–16, 25–8
	Pts: Hezonja 18; Rebs: Deck 6 Asts: Campazzo 8 PIR: Hezonja 18	Boxscore	Pts: Dorsey 20; Rebs: Milutinov, Vezenkov 9 Asts: Fournier 5 PIR: Milutinov 17	Arena: Movistar Arena; Attendance: 7,920; Referees: Damir Javor, Uroš Nikolić, Dragan Porobić

9 October 2025 3	Real Madrid (Spanish Basketball Federation)	85–72	(French Federation of Basketball) LDLC ASVEL	Madrid
21:00	Scoring by quarter: 27–19, 21–18, 18–16, 19–19
	Pts: Okeke 17; Rebs: Fernando, Lyles 6 Asts: Feliz 6 PIR: Okeke 25	Boxscore	Pts: Jackson 16; Rebs: Traoré 8 Asts: Ngouama 3 PIR: Massa 17	Arena: Movistar Arena; Attendance: 7,165; Referees: Saša Pukl, Rain Peerandi, Vassilis Pitsilkas

15 October 2025 4	Real Madrid (Spanish Basketball Federation)	93–86	(Basketball Federation of Serbia) Partizan Mozzart Bet	Madrid
20:45	Scoring by quarter: 24–12, 28–21, 23–23, 18–30
	Pts: Tavares 19; Rebs: Tavares 8 Asts: Campazzo 6 PIR: Tavares 27	Boxscore	Pts: Parker 23; Rebs: Osetkowski 6 Asts: Brown 3 PIR: Osetkowski 20	Arena: Movistar Arena; Attendance: 8,467; Referees: Emin Moğulkoç, Borys Ryzhyk, Ioannis Foufis

17 October 2025 5	Crvena zvezda Meridianbet (Basketball Federation of Serbia)	90–75	(Spanish Basketball Federation) Real Madrid	Belgrade
19:00	Scoring by quarter: 20–25, 23–14, 24–14, 23–22
	Pts: Nwora, Miller-McIntyre 18; Rebs: Miller-McIntyre 8 Asts: Miller-McIntyre 8 PIR: Miller-McIntyre 22	Boxscore	Pts: Okeke 16; Rebs: Okeke 8 Asts: Okeke, Maledon 3 PIR: Okeke 25	Arena: Belgrade Arena; Attendance: 20,293; Referees: Mehdi Difallah, Jakub Zamojski, Saulius Račys

22 October 2025 6	Maccabi Rapyd Tel Aviv (Israeli Basketball Association)	92–91	(Spanish Basketball Federation) Real Madrid	Belgrade (Note: Since 24 October 2023, Maccabi Playtika Tel Aviv play their home matches in Belgrade due to the inability to host matches in Israel as a result of the Gaza war until further notice.)
20:05	Scoring by quarter: 17–27, 40–21, 19–26, 16–17
	Pts: Walker 27; Rebs: Sorkin 6 Asts: Blatt 9 PIR: Sorkin 30	Boxscore	Pts: Hezonja 24; Rebs: Lyles 10; Asts: Campazzo 5 PIR: Lyles 29	Arena: Aleksandar Nikolić Hall; Attendance: 526; Referees: Damir Javor, Milan Nedović, Uroš Obrknežević

28 October 2025 7	Bayern Munich (German Basketball Federation)	90–84	(Spanish Basketball Federation) Real Madrid	Munich
20:30	Scoring by quarter: 27–25, 17–32, 25–10, 21–17
	Pts: Mike 29; Rebs: da Silva 10; Asts: Jović 6 PIR: Mike 30	Boxscore	Pts: Lyles 20; Rebs: Tavares 7 Asts: Maledon 4 PIR: Tavares 24	Arena: SAP Garden; Attendance: 11,500; Referees: Ilija Belošević, Igor Dragojević, Gytis Vilius

30 October 2025 8	Real Madrid (Spanish Basketball Federation)	84–58	(Turkish Basketball Federation) Fenerbahçe Beko	Madrid
21:00	Scoring by quarter: 25–16, 24–6, 15–13, 20–23
	Pts: Maledon 15; Rebs: Tavares 9 Asts: Campazzo 6 PIR: Maledon, Tavares 23	Boxscore	Pts: Baldwin 14; Rebs: Horton-Tucker 6 Asts: Baldwin 3 PIR: Colson 11	Arena: Movistar Arena; Attendance: 9,076; Referees: Tomislav Hordov, Oļegs Latiševs, Sašo Petek

7 November 2025 9	Barcelona (Spanish Basketball Federation)	92–101	(Spanish Basketball Federation) Real Madrid	Barcelona
20:30	Scoring by quarter: 24–34, 24–24, 21–27, 23–16
	Pts: Clyburn 19; Rebs: Shengelia 6 Asts: Shengelia 7 PIR: Clyburn 23	Boxscore	Pts: Lyles 29; Rebs: Tavares 10; Asts: Maledon, Campazzo 5 PIR: Lyles 32	Arena: Palau Blaugrana; Attendance: 7,294; Referees: Sreten Radović, Artūras Šukys, Kristaps Konstantinovs

11 November 2025 10	Valencia Basket (Spanish Basketball Federation)	89–76	(Spanish Basketball Federation) Real Madrid	Valencia
20:30	Scoring by quarter: 22–21, 23–17, 22–22, 22–16
	Pts: Moore 16; Rebs: Costello, Moore 5 Asts: Taylor 5 PIR: Moore 18	Boxscore	Pts: Lyles 23; Rebs: Lyles 9 Asts: Campazzo 7 PIR: Lyles 24	Arena: Roig Arena; Attendance: 14,922; Referees: Emin Moğulkoç, Milivoje Jovčić, Hugues Thépénier

13 November 2025 11	Real Madrid (Spanish Basketball Federation)	77–87	(Hellenic Basketball Federation) Panathinaikos AKTOR	Madrid
20:45	Scoring by quarter: 16–22, 22–30, 21–21, 18–14
	Pts: Tavares 20; Rebs: Tavares 10; Asts: Maledon 3 PIR: Tavares 30	Boxscore	Pts: Shorts 19; Rebs: Hernangómez 11; Asts: Sloukas 7 PIR: Shorts 24	Arena: Movistar Arena; Attendance: 10,176; Referees: Ilija Belošević, Joseph Bissang, Piotr Pastusiak

20 November 2025 12	Real Madrid (Spanish Basketball Federation)	100–99	(Lithuanian Basketball Federation) Žalgiris	Madrid
20:45	Scoring by quarter: 22–16, 21–21, 19–25, 38–37
	Pts: Maledon 25; Rebs: Tavares 11; Asts: Maledon 5 PIR: Maledon 34	Boxscore	Pts: Francisco 33; Rebs: Tubelis 5 Asts: Francisco 11; PIR: Francisco 37	Arena: Movistar Arena; Attendance: 9,152; Referees: Robert Lottermoser, Miloš Koljenšić, Marcin Kowalski

25 November 2025 13	Hapoel IBI Tel Aviv (Israeli Basketball Association)	74–75	(Spanish Basketball Federation) Real Madrid	Botevgrad (Note: During the 2025–26 EuroLeague season, Hapoel IBI Tel Aviv play their home matches in Bulgaria (Sofia and Botevgrad) due to the inability to host matches in Israel as a result of the Gaza war until further notice.)
19:00	Scoring by quarter: 18–22, 18–17, 22–21, 16–15
	Pts: Jones, Blakeney 14; Rebs: Oturu 9 Asts: Micić 5 PIR: Bryant, Blakeney 15	Boxscore	Pts: Hezonja 19; Rebs: Tavares 7 Asts: Campazzo 4 PIR: Hezonja 24	Arena: Arena Botevgrad; Attendance: 3,420; Referees: Sreten Radović, Artūras Šukys, Maxime Boubert

4 December 2025 14	Anadolu Efes (Turkish Basketball Federation)	75–81	(Spanish Basketball Federation) Real Madrid	Istanbul
18:15	Scoring by quarter: 17–17, 24–20, 18–23, 16–21
	Pts: Šmits 21; Rebs: Loyd 5 Asts: Weiler-Babb 9 PIR: Šmits 24	Boxscore	Pts: Hezonja 22; Rebs: Garuba 7 Asts: Campazzo 6 PIR: Hezonja 20	Arena: Turkcell Basketball Development Center; Attendance: 9,982; Referees: Tomislav Hordov, Milivoje Jovčić, Luka Kardum

11 December 2025 15	Real Madrid (Spanish Basketball Federation)	94–87	(Spanish Basketball Federation) Kosner Baskonia	Madrid
21:00	Scoring by quarter: 24–23, 18–16, 29–21, 23–27
	Pts: Hezonja 17; Rebs: Okeke 8 Asts: Campazzo 5 PIR: Campazzo 22	Boxscore	Pts: Howard 22; Rebs: Diakite, Luwawu-Cabarrot 5 Asts: Forrest 7 PIR: Howard, Luwawu-Cabarrot 21	Arena: Movistar Arena; Attendance: 8,141; Referees: Saša Pukl, Oļegs Latiševs, Tomasz Trawicki

16 December 2025 16	EA7 Emporio Armani Milan (Italian Basketball Federation)	89–82	(Spanish Basketball Federation) Real Madrid	Milan
20:30	Scoring by quarter: 23–21, 27–18, 16–21, 23–22
	Pts: Gudurić 22; Rebs: Gudurić 5 Asts: Shields, Gudurić 3 PIR: Gudurić 21	Boxscore	Pts: Campazzo 25; Rebs: Lyles, Okeke 7 Asts: Lyles 3 PIR: Campazzo 28	Arena: Allianz Cloud Arena; Attendance: 3,503; Referees: Emin Moğulkoç, Saulius Račys, Sašo Petek

18 December 2025 17	Real Madrid (Spanish Basketball Federation)	95–90	(French Federation of Basketball) Paris Basketball	Madrid
20:45	Scoring by quarter: 24–21, 25–29, 21–24, 25–16
	Pts: Maledon 21; Rebs: Okeke 8 Asts: Lyles 6 PIR: Maledon 27	Boxscore	Pts: Rhoden 19; Rebs: Dokossi 9 Asts: Hifi 5 PIR: Rhoden 26	Arena: Movistar Arena; Attendance: 7,923; Referees: Sreten Radović, Sérgio Silva, Stefan Ćalić

26 December 2025 18	Monaco (French Federation of Basketball)	100–95	(Spanish Basketball Federation) Real Madrid	Fontvieille
19:30	Scoring by quarter: 21–20, 26–23, 23–27, 30–25
	Pts: Okobo 22; Rebs: three players 7 Asts: James 5 PIR: Okobo 19	Boxscore	Pts: Campazzo 28; Rebs: Tavares 11; Asts: Campazzo 10; PIR: Campazzo 41	Arena: Salle Gaston Médecin; Attendance: 5,000; Referees: Milan Nedović, Miloš Koljenšić, Eduard Udyanskyy

2 January 2026 19	Real Madrid (Spanish Basketball Federation)	107–93	(United Arab Emirates Basketball Association) Dubai Basketball	Madrid
20:45	Scoring by quarter: 27–24, 17–34, 29–16, 34–19
	Pts: Hezonja 20; Rebs: Deck 7 Asts: Campazzo 6 PIR: Lyles 21	Boxscore	Pts: Bacon 26; Rebs: Kabengele 4 Asts: Avramović 7 PIR: Wright 16	Arena: Movistar Arena; Attendance: 9,875; Referees: Sreten Radović, Artūras Šukys, Sašo Petek

6 January 2026 20	LDLC ASVEL (French Federation of Basketball)	69–80	(Spanish Basketball Federation) Real Madrid	Décines-Charpieu
20:00	Scoring by quarter: 18–17, 23–19, 20–20, 8–24
	Pts: Watson 14; Rebs: Traoré 8 Asts: Heurtel 5 PIR: Traoré 12	Boxscore	Pts: Lyles 21; Rebs: Tavares 9 Asts: four players 3 PIR: Lyles 26	Arena: LDLC Arena; Attendance: 8,803; Referees: Robert Lottermoser, Saulius Račys, Christian Theis

8 January 2026 21	Real Madrid (Spanish Basketball Federation)	98–86	(Israeli Basketball Association) Maccabi Rapyd Tel Aviv	Madrid
20:45	Scoring by quarter: 21–25, 27–22, 28–18, 22–21
	Pts: Hezonja 16; Rebs: Tavares 11; Asts: Maledon 6 PIR: Hezonja, Tavares 20	Boxscore	Pts: DiBartolomeo 14; Rebs: Hoard 7 Asts: Sorkin 6 PIR: DiBartolomeo, Leaf 15	Arena: Movistar Arena; Attendance: 0 (Note: Real Madrid played their regular season home game against Maccabi Rapyd Tel Aviv behind closed doors for safety reasons.); Referees: Emin Moğulkoç, Ioannis Foufis, Guido Giovannetti

16 January 2026 22	Real Madrid (Spanish Basketball Federation)	80–61	(Spanish Basketball Federation) Barcelona	Madrid
20:45	Scoring by quarter: 21–14, 22–17, 20–16, 17–14
	Pts: Garuba 16; Rebs: Okeke 8 Asts: Campazzo 5 PIR: Tavares 20	Boxscore	Pts: Brizuela 13; Rebs: Parra 7 Asts: Shengelia, Laprovíttola 3 PIR: Shengelia 12	Arena: Movistar Arena; Attendance: 12,156; Referees: Damir Javor, Tomislav Hordov, Gytis Vilius

20 January 2026 23	Real Madrid (Spanish Basketball Federation)	106–77	(Italian Basketball Federation) EA7 Emporio Armani Milan	Madrid
20:45	Scoring by quarter: 30–23, 24–13, 24–19, 28–22
	Pts: Lyles 17; Rebs: three players 5 Asts: Maledon 7 PIR: Lyles 25	Boxscore	Pts: Gudurić 15; Rebs: Brooks, Nebo 4 Asts: Brown 3 PIR: Gudurić 15	Arena: Movistar Arena; Attendance: 7,513; Referees: Sreten Radović, Artūras Šukys, Vasiliki Tsaroucha

22 January 2026 24	Real Madrid (Spanish Basketball Federation)	90–78	(French Federation of Basketball) Monaco	Madrid
20:45	Scoring by quarter: 23–13, 31–18, 17–22, 19–25
	Pts: Lyles 20; Rebs: Tavares 10; Asts: Campazzo 10; PIR: Campazzo 28	Boxscore	Pts: James 17; Rebs: James, Mirotić 6 Asts: James 7 PIR: James 19	Arena: Movistar Arena; Attendance: 10,116; Referees: Milan Nedović, Marcin Kowalski, Luka Kardum

27 January 2026 25	Paris Basketball (French Federation of Basketball)	98–92	(Spanish Basketball Federation) Real Madrid	Paris
20:45	Scoring by quarter: 24–18, 26–24, 25–24, 23–26
	Pts: Hifi 21; Rebs: Faye 7 Asts: Robinson 5 PIR: M'Baye, Hifi 17	Boxscore	Pts: Lyles 21; Rebs: Hezonja 7 Asts: Campazzo 7 PIR: Lyles, Hezonja 19	Arena: Adidas Arena; Attendance: 7,871; Referees: Oļegs Latiševs, Miloš Koljenšić, Anne Panther

3 February 2026 26	Panathinaikos AKTOR (Hellenic Basketball Federation)	82–81	(Spanish Basketball Federation) Real Madrid	Marousi
20:15	Scoring by quarter: 16–26, 20–18, 24–17, 22–20
	Pts: Sloukas 22; Rebs: Hernangómez, Faried 6 Asts: Grant 7 PIR: Sloukas 27	Boxscore	Pts: Len 18; Rebs: Tavares 6 Asts: Lyles, Campazzo 5 PIR: Len 27	Arena: Telekom Center Athens; Attendance: 18,999; Referees: Ilija Belošević, Milivoje Jovčić, Jakub Zamojski

5 February 2026 27	Dubai Basketball (United Arab Emirates Basketball Association)	93–85	(Spanish Basketball Federation) Real Madrid	Dubai
17:00	Scoring by quarter: 11–19, 26–25, 32–24, 24–17
	Pts: Musa 20; Rebs: Petrušev 6 Asts: Avramović 7 PIR: Musa 25	Boxscore	Pts: Campazzo 24; Rebs: Tavares 9 Asts: Hezonja 5 PIR: Tavares 25	Arena: Coca-Cola Arena; Attendance: 7,648; Referees: Tomislav Hordov, Piotr Pastusiak, Saulius Račys

13 February 2026 28	Partizan Mozzart Bet (Basketball Federation of Serbia)	73–77	(Spanish Basketball Federation) Real Madrid	Belgrade
20:30	Scoring by quarter: 19–20, 14–23, 28–19, 12–15
	Pts: Brown 14; Rebs: Bonga, Fernando 8 Asts: Calathes, Brown 4 PIR: Fernando 22	Boxscore	Pts: Lyles, Hezonja 14; Rebs: Tavares 7 Asts: Campazzo, Hezonja 4 PIR: Lyles 20	Arena: Belgrade Arena; Attendance: 18,254; Referees: Emin Moğulkoç, Rain Peerandi, Thomas Bissuel

26 February 2026 29	Real Madrid (Spanish Basketball Federation)	93–70	(German Basketball Federation) Bayern Munich	Madrid
20:45	Scoring by quarter: 19–12, 34–21, 25–14, 15–23
	Pts: Hezonja 16; Rebs: Okeke 5 Asts: Campazzo 6 PIR: Hezonja 19	Boxscore	Pts: Jessup 17; Rebs: Gabriel 8 Asts: Dimitrijević 4 PIR: Jessup 18	Arena: Movistar Arena; Attendance: 9,728; Referees: Damir Javor, Gytis Vilius, Josip Radojković

5 March 2026 30	Real Madrid (Spanish Basketball Federation)	92–84	(Italian Basketball Federation) Virtus Bologna	Madrid
20:45	Scoring by quarter: 22–23, 24–17, 18–21, 28–23
	Pts: Hezonja 19; Rebs: Okeke 7 Asts: Campazzo, Feliz 4 PIR: Tavares, Hezonja 22	Boxscore	Pts: Edwards 32; Rebs: Smailagić 11; Asts: Edwards, Vildoza 5 PIR: Edwards 27	Arena: Movistar Arena; Attendance: 8,368; Referees: Ilija Belošević, Milan Nedović, Steve Bittner

12 March 2026 31	Real Madrid (Spanish Basketball Federation)	96–79	(Spanish Basketball Federation) Valencia Basket	Madrid
20:45	Scoring by quarter: 20–19, 31–24, 24–22, 21–14
	Pts: Hezonja 16; Rebs: Tavares 9 Asts: Campazzo 9 PIR: Hezonja 19	Boxscore	Pts: Montero 18; Rebs: Pradilla 10; Asts: Montero 5 PIR: Montero 27	Arena: Movistar Arena; Attendance: 10,837; Referees: Saša Pukl, Oļegs Latiševs, Marcin Kowalski

20 March 2026 32	Žalgiris (Lithuanian Basketball Federation)	87–85	(Spanish Basketball Federation) Real Madrid	Kaunas
19:00	Scoring by quarter: 25–29, 28–26, 15–17, 19–13
	Pts: Francisco 20; Rebs: Tubelis 9 Asts: Williams-Goss 10; PIR: Francisco 22	Boxscore	Pts: Hezonja 18; Rebs: Tavares 10; Asts: Llull, Abalde 4 PIR: Tavares 25	Arena: Žalgirio Arena; Attendance: 15,316; Referees: Sreten Radović, Borys Ryzhyk, Miloš Koljenšić

24 March 2026 33	Real Madrid (Spanish Basketball Federation)	92–83	(Israeli Basketball Association) Hapoel IBI Tel Aviv	Madrid
20:45	Scoring by quarter: 24–19, 21–16, 26–25, 21–23
	Pts: Hezonja 15; Rebs: Hezonja 10; Asts: Campazzo 5 PIR: Hezonja 23	Boxscore	Pts: Jones 15; Rebs: Micić, Edwards 5 Asts: Micić 4 PIR: Edwards 19	Arena: Movistar Arena; Attendance: 0 (Note: Real Madrid played their regular season home game against Hapoel IBI Tel Aviv behind closed doors for safety reasons.); Referees: Damir Javor, Gytis Vilius, Saulius Račys

26 March 2026 34	Real Madrid (Spanish Basketball Federation)	82–71	(Turkish Basketball Federation) Anadolu Efes	Madrid
20:45	Scoring by quarter: 11–21, 31–12, 18–20, 22–18
	Pts: Lyles 14; Rebs: Tavares 9 Asts: Campazzo 7 PIR: Deck 21	Boxscore	Pts: Loyd 21; Rebs: Osmani 7 Asts: Loyd 6 PIR: Loyd 35	Arena: Movistar Arena; Attendance: 9,805; Referees: Mehdi Difallah, Josip Radojković, Manuel Attard

3 April 2026 35	Kosner Baskonia (Spanish Basketball Federation)	98–96	(Spanish Basketball Federation) Real Madrid	Vitoria-Gasteiz
20:30	Scoring by quarter: 29–27, 19–26, 25–23, 25–20
	Pts: Luwawu-Cabarrot 26; Rebs: Luwawu-Cabarrot 6 Asts: Villar, Luwawu-Cabarrot 3 PIR: Luwawu-Cabarrot 26	Boxscore	Pts: Campazzo 21; Rebs: Tavares 11; Asts: Campazzo 9 PIR: Campazzo 30	Arena: Buesa Arena; Attendance: 11,239; Referees: Saša Pukl, Milan Nedović, Joseph Bissang

7 April 2026 36	Olympiacos (Hellenic Basketball Federation)	102–88	(Spanish Basketball Federation) Real Madrid	Piraeus
20:15	Scoring by quarter: 31–19, 18–23, 23–15, 30–31
	Pts: Dorsey 37; Rebs: Vezenkov 9 Asts: Joseph 6 PIR: Dorsey 43	Boxscore	Pts: Lyles 22; Rebs: Tavares 9 Asts: three players 4 PIR: Lyles 24	Arena: Peace and Friendship Stadium; Attendance: 12,750; Referees: Tomislav Hordov, Luka Kardum, Thomas Bissuel

9 April 2026 37	Fenerbahçe Beko (Turkish Basketball Federation)	69–74	(Spanish Basketball Federation) Real Madrid	Istanbul
19:45	Scoring by quarter: 21–19, 13–21, 24–14, 11–20
	Pts: Boston 21; Rebs: Melli 6 Asts: Baldwin 5 PIR: Boston 21	Boxscore	Pts: Campazzo 15; Rebs: Lyles, Tavares 5 Asts: Hezonja 5 PIR: Campazzo 18	Arena: Ülker Sports and Event Hall; Attendance: 12,803; Referees: Robert Lottermoser, Oļegs Latiševs, Marcin Kowalski

16 April 2026 38	Real Madrid (Spanish Basketball Federation)	103–82	(Basketball Federation of Serbia) Crvena zvezda Meridianbet	Madrid
20:45	Scoring by quarter: 27–25, 29–19, 21–19, 26–19
	Pts: Hezonja 19; Rebs: Lyles, Maledon 5 Asts: Campazzo 8 PIR: Campazzo 21	Boxscore	Pts: Nwora 15; Rebs: Miller-McIntyre, Izundu 7 Asts: Miller-McIntyre 6 PIR: Nwora, Moneke 15	Arena: Movistar Arena; Attendance: 10,812; Referees: Borys Ryzhyk, Jakub Zamojski, Rain Peerandi

=== EuroLeague Playoffs ===
==== Playoff series ====
29 April 2026 1	Real Madrid (Spanish Basketball Federation)	86–82	(Israeli Basketball Association) Hapoel IBI Tel Aviv	Madrid
20:45	Scoring by quarter: 27–18, 21–15, 22–22, 16–27
	Pts: Campazzo 21; Rebs: Okeke 7 Asts: Hezonja 5 PIR: Campazzo 18	Boxscore	Pts: Blakeney 25; Rebs: Oturu 17; Asts: Jones 8 PIR: Oturu 38	Arena: Movistar Arena; Attendance: 6,908 (Note: Real Madrid played their playoff series home games against Hapoel IBI Tel Aviv with attendance limited to season ticket holders for safety reasons.); Referees: Ilija Belošević, Gytis Vilius, Kristaps Konstantinovs

1 May 2026 2	Real Madrid (Spanish Basketball Federation)	102–75	(Israeli Basketball Association) Hapoel IBI Tel Aviv	Madrid
20:45	Scoring by quarter: 24–21, 16–21, 33–20, 29–13
	Pts: Campazzo 23; Rebs: Garuba 9 Asts: Campazzo 6 PIR: Campazzo 30	Boxscore	Pts: Oturu 19; Rebs: Bryant, Blakeney 5 Asts: Bryant, Micić 4 PIR: Oturu 16	Arena: Movistar Arena; Attendance: 6,588; Referees: Emin Moğulkoç, Mehdi Difallah, Marcin Kowalski

5 May 2026 3	Hapoel IBI Tel Aviv (Israeli Basketball Association)	76–69	(Spanish Basketball Federation) Real Madrid	Botevgrad (Note: After a brief return to Israel, on March 4, 2026, the EuroLeague announced Hapoel IBI Tel Aviv would go back to hosting matches in Bulgaria due to the inability to do so in Israel as a result of the 2026 Iran war.)
18:00	Scoring by quarter: 18–21, 16–15, 21–10, 21–23
	Pts: Jones, Bryant 19; Rebs: Edwards 10; Asts: Bryant 3 PIR: Bryant 28	Boxscore	Pts: Lyles 14; Rebs: three players 5 Asts: Maledon 5 PIR: Lyles 17	Arena: Arena Botevgrad; Attendance: 2,630; Referees: Sreten Radović, Robert Lottermoser, Saulius Račys

7 May 2026 4	Hapoel IBI Tel Aviv (Israeli Basketball Association)	81–87	(Spanish Basketball Federation) Real Madrid	Botevgrad
20:00	Scoring by quarter: 21–23, 15–23, 17–17, 28–24
	Pts: Oturu 29; Rebs: Micić, Oturu 7 Asts: Micić 11; PIR: Micić, Oturu 34	Boxscore	Pts: Garuba 16; Rebs: Garuba, Deck 6 Asts: Campazzo 7 PIR: Garuba 20	Arena: Arena Botevgrad; Attendance: 2,200; Referees: Saša Pukl, Emin Moğulkoç, Oļegs Latiševs

=== EuroLeague Final Four ===
22 May 2026 Semifinal	Valencia Basket (Spain)	90–105	(Spain) Real Madrid	Marousi
20:00	Scoring by quarter: 28–26, 28–36, 17–24, 17–19
	Pts: three players 15; Rebs: Pradilla 8 Asts: Montero 9 PIR: Pradilla 23	Boxscore	Pts: Hezonja 25; Rebs: Deck, Feliz 8 Asts: Campazzo 8 PIR: Hezonja 33	Arena: Telekom Center Athens; Attendance: N/A; Referees: Robert Lottermoser, Mehdi Difallah, Oļegs Latiševs

24 May 2026 Final	Olympiacos (Greece)	92–85	(Spain) Real Madrid	Marousi
20:00	Scoring by quarter: 19–26, 27–18, 15–21, 31–20
	Pts: Fournier 20; Rebs: Milutinov 8 Asts: Joseph 5 PIR: Peters 26	Boxscore	Pts: Lyles 24; Rebs: Lyles 8 Asts: Campazzo 6 PIR: Lyles 30	Arena: Telekom Center Athens; Attendance: N/A; Referees: Sreten Radović, Robert Lottermoser, Oļegs Latiševs

=== Copa del Rey ===
19 February 2026 Quarterfinal	Real Madrid	100–70	Unicaja	Valencia
21:00	Scoring by quarter: 28–12, 22–16, 23–16, 27–26
	Pts: Lyles 16; Rebs: Lyles 6 Asts: Maledon, Feliz 4 PIR: Lyles 23	Boxscore	Pts: Webb 18; Rebs: Webb 7 Asts: Balcerowski 4 PIR: Webb 17	Arena: Roig Arena; Attendance: 14,062; Referees: Carlos Peruga, Arnau Padrós, Jorge Martínez

21 February 2026 Semifinal	Valencia Basket	106–108	Real Madrid	Valencia
18:00	Scoring by quarter: 34–16, 20–34, 25–27, 27–31
	Pts: Montero 26; Rebs: Reuvers 5 Asts: Thompson 5 PIR: Montero 27	Boxscore	Pts: Hezonja 25; Rebs: Tavares, Garuba 8 Asts: Maledon 5 PIR: Tavares 24	Arena: Roig Arena; Attendance: 15,221; Referees: Antonio Conde, Jordi Aliaga, Sergio Manuel

22 February 2026 Final	Real Madrid	89–100	Kosner Baskonia	Valencia
19:00	Scoring by quarter: 26–26, 26–21, 20–20, 17–33
	Pts: Feliz, Hezonja 15; Rebs: Feliz 9 Asts: Campazzo 5 PIR: Campazzo 19	Boxscore	Pts: Luwawu-Cabarrot 28; Rebs: Forrest 9 Asts: Forrest 11; PIR: Forrest 38	Arena: Roig Arena; Attendance: 15,314; Referees: Carlos Peruga, Antonio Conde, Fernando Calatrava

=== Supercopa de España ===
27 September 2025 Semifinal	Real Madrid	72–71	La Laguna Tenerife	Málaga
21:00	Scoring by quarter: 18–17, 17–28, 20–15, 17–11
	Pts: Deck, Llull 12; Rebs: Okeke, Tavares 7 Asts: Feliz 4 PIR: Deck 19	Boxscore	Pts: Shermadini 23; Rebs: Abromaitis 5 Asts: Fitipaldo 5 PIR: Shermadini 28	Arena: Martín Carpena; Attendance: 8,507; Referees: Antonio Conde, Óscar Perea, Andrés Fernández

28 September 2025 Final	Real Madrid	94–98	Valencia Basket	Málaga
19:00	Scoring by quarter: 27–24, 17–27, 25–18, 25–29
	Pts: Hezonja 19; Rebs: three players 7 Asts: Campazzo 5 PIR: Campazzo 21	Boxscore	Pts: de Larrea 21; Rebs: Costello 7 Asts: Moore 6 PIR: de Larrea 23	Arena: Martín Carpena; Attendance: 9,630; Referees: Emilio Pérez Pizarro, Jordi Aliaga, Rafael Serrano

== Statistics ==
=== Liga ACB ===
Player	GP	GS	MPG	2FG%	3FG%	FT%	RPG	APG	SPG	BPG	PPG	PIR
Trey Lyles	28	8	20:50	54.9%	37.4%	79%	5	1.8	0.4	0.8	11.7	14.1
David Krämer	30	10	12:56	61.3%	41.6%	73.2%	1.8	0.4	0.5	–	6.7	5.7
Mady Sissoko	3	2	14:31	85.7%	–	75%	4.7	–	–	0.7	6	8.3
Alberto Abalde	32	21	16:21	60.7%	33.8%	77.4%	1.5	1.2	0.5	–	5.2	5
Facundo Campazzo	31	27	22:24	57.8%	30.8%	87.3%	1.9	4.6	1.1	0.1	9.3	11.2
Chuma Okeke	25	14	19:33	57.5%	38.2%	78.6%	3.6	0.8	0.7	0.3	6.7	8
Gabriele Procida	29	6	14:22	77.3%	41.9%	76.5%	1.6	0.7	0.5	0.1	6.4	5.8
Mario Hezonja	31	30	23:54	57.5%	36.6%	89%	4.9	1.9	0.9	0.1	17.5	19.1
Théo Maledon	31	7	19:36	51.3%	35.3%	85.3%	2.4	3.4	0.5	0.2	9.5	11.6
Izan Almansa	19	1	10:29	71.7%	–	77.8%	2.3	0.4	0.2	0.3	5.1	5.8
Gabriel Deck	20	10	22:05	57.5%	24.3%	71.8%	3.4	0.8	0.6	0.2	7.4	8
Usman Garuba	26	1	12:54	63.5%	50%	72.5%	3.2	0.8	0.8	0.8	5.4	7.2
Bruno Fernando	3	1	10:08	45.5%	–	50%	3.7	0.3	0.7	0.3	4	4.7
Edy Tavares	21	1	21:42	75.8%	–	75.4%	6.4	0.5	0.8	2.2	9.3	16.4
Sergio Llull	36	9	16:39	45.7%	28%	86.2%	1.3	2.4	0.4	–	6.9	6.1
Andrés Feliz	31	6	16:59	59.6%	31.1%	80%	2.8	2.2	0.6	0.1	7.7	9.3
Alex Len	21	8	13:23	67.5%	–	61.3%	3.6	0.7	0.5	1.2	7.1	9.6
Ömer Yurtseven	5	3	13:32	67.9%	–	75%	3	0.6	0.4	1.2	8.8	10.6
Egor Amosov	1	0	1:12	–	–	–	–	–	–	–	–	–
Gunars Grinvalds	1	0	1:06	–	–	50%	–	–	–	–	1	–
TOTAL				60.2%	34.4%	79.8%	36.5	18.2	7.5	4.3	93.8	110.3

Source: ACB

=== EuroLeague ===
Player	GP	GS	MPG	2FG%	3FG%	FT%	RPG	APG	SPG	BPG	PPG	PIR
Trey Lyles	42	12	21:11	54.5%	45.9%	78.6%	4.5	1.5	0.5	0.5	13.5	15.1
David Krämer	14	2	11:20	36.4%	32%	50%	1.2	0.9	0.2	–	2.5	0.9
Alberto Abalde	42	40	15:34	45.8%	46.9%	80%	1.6	1.3	0.4	–	4.6	3.8
Facundo Campazzo	44	37	24:23	46.3%	42.1%	84.4%	1.9	5.1	1.1	–	12	14.4
Chuma Okeke	43	32	17:54	64.1%	38.6%	68.4%	3.9	0.8	0.6	0.5	5.6	8
Gabriele Procida	8	1	4:59	40%	40%	100%	0.5	0.1	–	–	1.6	0.9
Mario Hezonja	44	36	22:36	52.1%	30.6%	80.5%	4	2.4	0.8	–	13.3	12.4
Théo Maledon	38	3	17	52.3%	32%	86.9%	2.2	2.9	0.5	0.1	9.4	11.2
Izan Almansa	3	0	3:12	100%	–	–	–	–	–	–	0.7	-0.7
Gabriel Deck	41	8	20:24	66.9%	33.8%	82.5%	3.5	1.2	0.4	–	7.1	8.7
Usman Garuba	40	1	12:29	63.4%	60%	66%	2.8	0.5	0.8	0.7	5.2	6.4
Bruno Fernando	5	0	10:25	66.7%	–	66.7%	3.4	0.8	0.2	0.2	4.4	5.2
Edy Tavares	39	39	22:45	68.9%	–	73%	6.6	0.6	0.6	1.8	9.6	15.5
Sergio Llull	40	0	10:39	35.7%	26.8%	66.7%	0.8	1.5	0.2	–	3.1	1.9
Andrés Feliz	39	6	16:39	52.7%	41.2%	73%	2.5	2	0.6	–	6.9	6.7
Alex Len	23	3	9:10	52.3%	–	76.7%	2	0.3	0.1	0.9	3	3.7
Gunars Grinvalds	1	0	0:48	–	–	–	–	–	–	–	–	–
TOTAL				56%	37.7%	78.9%	37.6	19.2	6.3	3.9	88.1	103.6

Source: EuroLeague
