= 2026 EuroLeague SuperCup =

Basketball tournament in Abu Dhabi

- Season: 2026–27 EuroLeague

Tournament details
- Arena: Etihad Arena; Abu Dhabi, United Arab Emirates
- Dates: 18–19 September 2026

Final positions
- Champions: (Spanish Basketball Federation) Real Madrid (1st title)
- Runners-up: (Hellenic Basketball Federation) Olympiacos
- Third place: (Turkish Basketball Federation) Fenerbahçe Tarfin
- Fourth place: (United Arab Emirates Basketball Association) Dubai Basketball

Awards and statistics
- MVP: (Federaçao Caboverdiana de Basquetbol) Edy Tavares
- Top scorer(s): (French Federation of Basketball) Élie Okobo (38 points)

The 2026 EuroLeague SuperCup, officially known as the Euroleague Basketball SuperCup Abu Dhabi 2026 for sponsorship reasons, was the inaugural edition of the EuroLeague SuperCup, an annual men's professional basketball tournament organized by Euroleague Basketball. The competition serves as the official opening event of the 2026–27 EuroLeague season.

The tournament was held in a Final Four format and took place between 18 and 19 September 2026 at the Etihad Arena on Yas Island in Abu Dhabi, United Arab Emirates.

Real Madrid became the first ever SuperCup holders, defeating Olympiacos 93–89 in the championship game, in a rematch of the 2026 EuroLeague final.

== History and organization ==
The creation of the EuroLeague SuperCup was officially approved during the EuroLeague Basketball Shareholders General Assembly in July 2026. On 24 August 2026, Euroleague Basketball and the Department of Culture and Tourism – Abu Dhabi (DCT Abu Dhabi) officially announced the details of the inaugural tournament, expanding on their multi-year partnership following the 2025 EuroLeague Final Four in the city.

== Qualified teams ==
Four teams qualified for the inaugural tournament based on their competitive results and regional status from the previous seasons.

Team	Method of qualification	Appearance
(Greece) Olympiacos	2025–26 EuroLeague champions	1st
(Spain) Real Madrid	2025–26 EuroLeague runners-up	1st
(Turkey) Fenerbahçe Tarfin	2024–25 EuroLeague champions	1st
(United Arab Emirates) Dubai Basketball	Host team	1st

== Venue ==
The tournament will be hosted entirely at the Etihad Arena, located on Yas Island in Abu Dhabi. The indoor arena has a seating capacity of 18,000 for basketball events.

Abu Dhabi
Etihad Arena
Capacity: 18,000
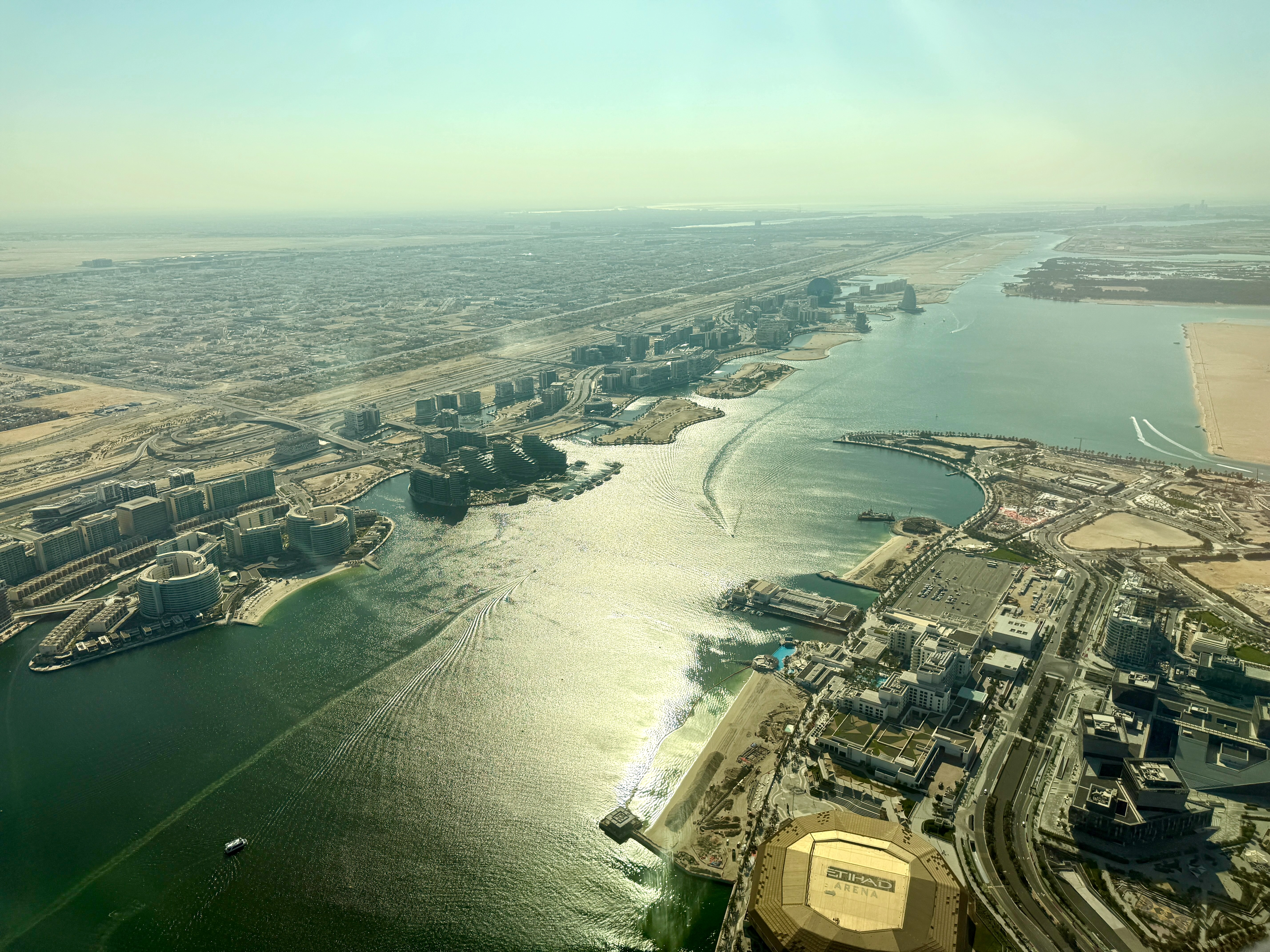

== Bracket ==
Semifinals
18 September
(Hellenic Basketball Federation) Olympiacos	92
(Turkish Basketball Federation) Fenerbahçe Tarfin	90
18 September
(United Arab Emirates Basketball Association) Dubai Basketball	95
(Spanish Basketball Federation) Real Madrid	98

Championship game
19 September
(Hellenic Basketball Federation) Olympiacos	89
(Spanish Basketball Federation) Real Madrid	93
Third place game
19 September
(Turkish Basketball Federation) Fenerbahçe Tarfin	85
(United Arab Emirates Basketball Association) Dubai Basketball	77

== Semifinals ==
=== Semifinal A ===
18 September 2026	Olympiacos (Hellenic Basketball Federation)	92–90	(Turkish Basketball Federation) Fenerbahçe Tarfin	Abu Dhabi, United Arab Emirates
16:00 (CEST)	Scoring by quarter: 20–25, 23–20, 26–33, 23–12
	Pts: Fournier 19; Rebs: Hall 12; Asts: Miller-McIntyre 4 PIR: Hall 21	Boxscore	Pts: Shields 18; Rebs: Key 6 Asts: Baldwin, Clyburn 4 PIR: Key 31	Arena: Etihad Arena; Referees: Robert Lottermoser, Emilio Pérez, Luka Kardum

Starters:			Pts	Reb	Ast
PG	0	(Bulgaria) Codi Miller-McIntyre	2	2	4
SG	22	(Greece) Tyler Dorsey	9	0	1
SF	3	(United States) Tyson Ward	9	1	1
PF	14	(Bulgaria) Sasha Vezenkov	7	3	1
C	45	(Azerbaijan) Donta Hall	12	12	1
Reserves:					
G	8	(Dominican Republic) Jean Montero	13	1	3
SF	16	(Greece) Kostas Papanikolaou	DNP		
PF	24	(Senegal) Mbaye Ndiaye	9	5	1
C	29	(Greece) Antonis Karagiannidis	DNP		
PG	34	(Canada) Cory Joseph	10	1	3
C	88	(United States) Tyrique Jones	2	3	0
SG	94	(France) Evan Fournier	19	1	2
Head coach:
(Hellenic Basketball Federation) Georgios Bartzokas

Olympiacos	Fenerbahçe

Olympiacos	Statistics	Fenerbahçe
22/40 (55.0%)	2-pt field goals	15/27 (55.6%)
10/23 (43.5%)	3-pt field goals	14/27 (51.9%)
18/19 (94.7%)	Free throws	18/22 (81.8%)
16	Offensive rebounds	8
16	Defensive rebounds	13
32	Total rebounds	21
17	Assists	21
19	Turnovers	19
10	Steals	7
1	Blocks	2
23	Fouls	18

Starters:			Pts	Reb	Ast
PG	2	(United States) Wade Baldwin	9	1	4
SG	31	(Denmark) Shavon Shields	18	3	1
SF	21	(United States) Will Clyburn	8	2	4
PF	4	(Italy) Nicolò Melli	5	3	2
C	1	(United States) Marcus Bingham	10	1	2
Reserves:					
C	5	(Turkey) Sertaç Şanlı	DNP		
G	8	(United States) Talen Horton-Tucker	8	0	1
G/F	9	(United States) Johnny Juzang	3	0	1
PG	11	(United States) Trent Forrest	7	2	3
SF	17	(Turkey) Onuralp Bitim	0	0	0
C	30	(Gabon) Chris Silva	5	2	1
Head coach:
(Lithuanian Basketball Federation) Šarūnas Jasikevičius

=== Semifinal B ===
18 September 2026	Dubai Basketball (United Arab Emirates Basketball Association)	95–98(OT)	(Spanish Basketball Federation) Real Madrid	Abu Dhabi, United Arab Emirates
19:00 (CEST)	Scoring by quarter: 27–18, 16–24, 20–22, 25–24, Overtime: 7–10
	Pts: Okobo 24; Rebs: Shengelia 5 Asts: Bacon 4 PIR: Bacon 21	Boxscore	Pts: Tavares, Luwawu-Cabarrot 20; Rebs: Tavares, Pradilla 7 Asts: Luwawu-Cabarrot 6 PIR: Tavares 22	Arena: Etihad Arena; Referees: Ilija Belošević, Emin Moğulkoç, Gytis Vilius

Starters:			Pts	Reb	Ast
PG	25	(United States) McKinley Wright	12	0	2
SG	0	(France) Élie Okobo	24	1	3
SF	3	(United States) Dwayne Bacon	19	1	4
PF	4	(United States) Jaron Blossomgame	4	3	1
C	17	(Canada) Mfiondu Kabengele	10	3	0
Reserves:					
SF	1	(United States) Justin Anderson	3	0	1
SG	6	(United States) Davion Mintz	3	2	1
F	8	(Latvia) Dāvis Bertāns	0	1	0
C	21	(Guinea) Mamadi Diakite	5	0	0
PF	23	(Georgia (country)) Tornike Shengelia	11	5	1
F/C	30	(Serbia) Filip Petrušev	0	0	0
PG	44	(Greece) Thomas Walkup	4	1	3
Head coach:
(Spanish Basketball Federation) Xavi Pascual

Dubai	Real Madrid

Dubai	Statistics	Real Madrid
18/33 (54.5%)	2-pt field goals	18/42 (42.9%)
12/26 (46.2%)	3-pt field goals	13/24 (54.2%)
23/26 (88.5%)	Free throws	23/26 (88.5%)
5	Offensive rebounds	16
20	Defensive rebounds	22
25	Total rebounds	38
16	Assists	24
17	Turnovers	22
8	Steals	7
2	Blocks	0
21	Fouls	28

Starters:			Pts	Reb	Ast
PG	7	(Argentina) Facundo Campazzo	5	1	4
SG	24	(Dominican Republic) Andrés Feliz	10	3	2
SF	14	(Argentina) Gabriel Deck	15	3	1
PF	8	(United States) Chuma Okeke	4	1	0
C	22	(Cape Verde) Edy Tavares	20	7	1
Reserves:					
SG	2	(Ukraine) Max Shulga	0	0	0
G/F	3	(France) Timothé Luwawu-Cabarrot	20	3	6
PF	4	(Spain) Jaime Pradilla	13	7	3
G/F	6	(Spain) Alberto Abalde	0	3	4
G	12	(France) Théo Maledon	4	0	0
PF	20	(Finland) Mikael Jantunen	5	2	3
C	33	(France) Olivier Sarr	2	1	0
Head coach:
(Spanish Basketball Federation) Pedro Martínez

== Third place game ==
19 September 2026	Fenerbahçe Tarfin (Turkish Basketball Federation)	85–77	(United Arab Emirates Basketball Association) Dubai Basketball	Abu Dhabi, United Arab Emirates
16:00 (CEST)	Scoring by quarter: 22–21, 25–18, 17–26, 21–12
	Pts: Horton-Tucker 23; Rebs: Melli 4 Asts: Sargiūnas 4 PIR: Horton-Tucker 28	Boxscore	Pts: Okobo, Bertāns 14; Rebs: Okobo, Blossomgame 6 Asts: Wright, Walkup 6 PIR: Blossomgame 13	Arena: Etihad Arena; Referees: Emilio Pérez, Kristaps Konstantinovs, Thomas Bissuel

Starters:			Pts	Reb	Ast
PG	11	(United States) Trent Forrest	11	3	3
SG	8	(United States) Talen Horton-Tucker	23	3	0
SF	17	(Turkey) Onuralp Bitim	2	1	0
PF	4	(Italy) Nicolò Melli	3	4	2
C	30	(Gabon) Chris Silva	4	3	0
Reserves:					
G	2	(United States) Wade Baldwin	11	1	3
C	5	(Turkey) Sertaç Şanlı	2	1	1
SG	10	(Turkey) Melih Mahmutoğlu	1	0	0
F	12	(United States) Braxton Key	8	1	1
SF	21	(United States) Will Clyburn	6	2	1
G/F	31	(Denmark) Shavon Shields	10	1	0
G	43	(Lithuania) Ignas Sargiūnas	4	2	4
Head coach:
(Lithuanian Basketball Federation) Šarūnas Jasikevičius

Fenerbahçe	Dubai

Fenerbahçe	Statistics	Dubai
17/25 (68.0%)	2-pt field goals	15/36 (41.7%)
10/29 (34.5%)	3-pt field goals	10/25 (40.0%)
21/25 (84.0%)	Free throws	17/22 (77.3%)
2	Offensive rebounds	14
22	Defensive rebounds	25
24	Total rebounds	39
15	Assists	25
7	Turnovers	14
9	Steals	4
4	Blocks	3
21	Fouls	22

Starters:			Pts	Reb	Ast
PG	44	(Greece) Thomas Walkup	3	2	6
SG	0	(France) Élie Okobo	14	6	4
SF	1	(United States) Justin Anderson	0	2	1
PF	23	(Georgia (country)) Tornike Shengelia	8	2	1
C	30	(Serbia) Filip Petrušev	7	2	0
Reserves:					
PF	4	(United States) Jaron Blossomgame	6	6	1
SG	6	(United States) Davion Mintz	2	4	4
F	8	(Latvia) Dāvis Bertāns	14	2	0
G	11	(Bosnia and Herzegovina) Kosta Kondić	5	2	0
C	17	(Canada) Mfiondu Kabengele	9	3	1
C	21	(Guinea) Mamadi Diakite	7	4	1
PG	25	(United States) McKinley Wright	2	3	6
Head coach:
(Spanish Basketball Federation) Xavi Pascual

== Championship game ==
19 September 2026	Olympiacos (Hellenic Basketball Federation)	89–93	(Spanish Basketball Federation) Real Madrid	Abu Dhabi, United Arab Emirates
19:00 (CEST)	Scoring by quarter: 15–24, 28–23, 29–28, 17–18
	Pts: Vezenkov 22; Rebs: Vezenkov 5 Asts: Miller-McIntyre 9 PIR: Vezenkov 25	Boxscore	Pts: Luwawu-Cabarrot 12; Rebs: Deck, Tavares 7 Asts: Campazzo 9 PIR: Campazzo 17	Arena: Etihad Arena; Referees: Ilija Belošević, Emin Moğulkoç, Luka Kardum

Starters:			Pts	Reb	Ast
PG	0	(Bulgaria) Codi Miller-McIntyre	3	1	9
SG	22	(Greece) Tyler Dorsey	7	1	0
SF	3	(United States) Tyson Ward	10	2	0
PF	14	(Bulgaria) Sasha Vezenkov	22	5	2
C	45	(Azerbaijan) Donta Hall	13	4	1
Reserves:					
G	8	(Dominican Republic) Jean Montero	12	4	4
SF	16	(Greece) Kostas Papanikolaou	2	1	1
PF	24	(Senegal) Mbaye Ndiaye	4	3	3
C	29	(Greece) Antonis Karagiannidis	DNP		
PG	34	(Canada) Cory Joseph	2	0	2
C	88	(United States) Tyrique Jones	0	3	1
SG	94	(France) Evan Fournier	14	1	1
Head coach:
(Hellenic Basketball Federation) Georgios Bartzokas

Olympiacos	Real Madrid

Olympiacos	Statistics	Real Madrid
19/45 (42.2%)	2-pt field goals	20/32 (62.5%)
8/22 (36.4%)	3-pt field goals	10/28 (35.7%)
27/37 (73.0%)	Free throws	23/26 (88.5%)
14	Offensive rebounds	14
16	Defensive rebounds	30
30	Total rebounds	44
24	Assists	31
13	Turnovers	23
14	Steals	8
2	Blocks	3
21	Fouls	29

2026 EuroLeague SuperCup champions

Real Madrid
(1st title)

Starters:			Pts	Reb	Ast
PG	7	(Argentina) Facundo Campazzo	7	5	9
SG	12	(France) Théo Maledon	10	3	6
SF	14	(Argentina) Gabriel Deck	8	7	2
PF	20	(Finland) Mikael Jantunen	11	2	1
C	22	(Cape Verde) Edy Tavares	6	7	0
Reserves:					
G/F	3	(France) Timothé Luwawu-Cabarrot	12	4	2
PF	4	(Spain) Jaime Pradilla	11	3	5
G/F	6	(Spain) Alberto Abalde	5	1	0
PF	8	(United States) Chuma Okeke	2	0	0
G	23	(Spain) Sergio Llull	3	1	1
PG	24	(Dominican Republic) Andrés Feliz	11	3	4
C	30	(United States) Damian Jones	7	3	1
Head coach:
(Spanish Basketball Federation) Pedro Martínez
