= Jaime Pradilla =

Spanish basketball player (2001-)

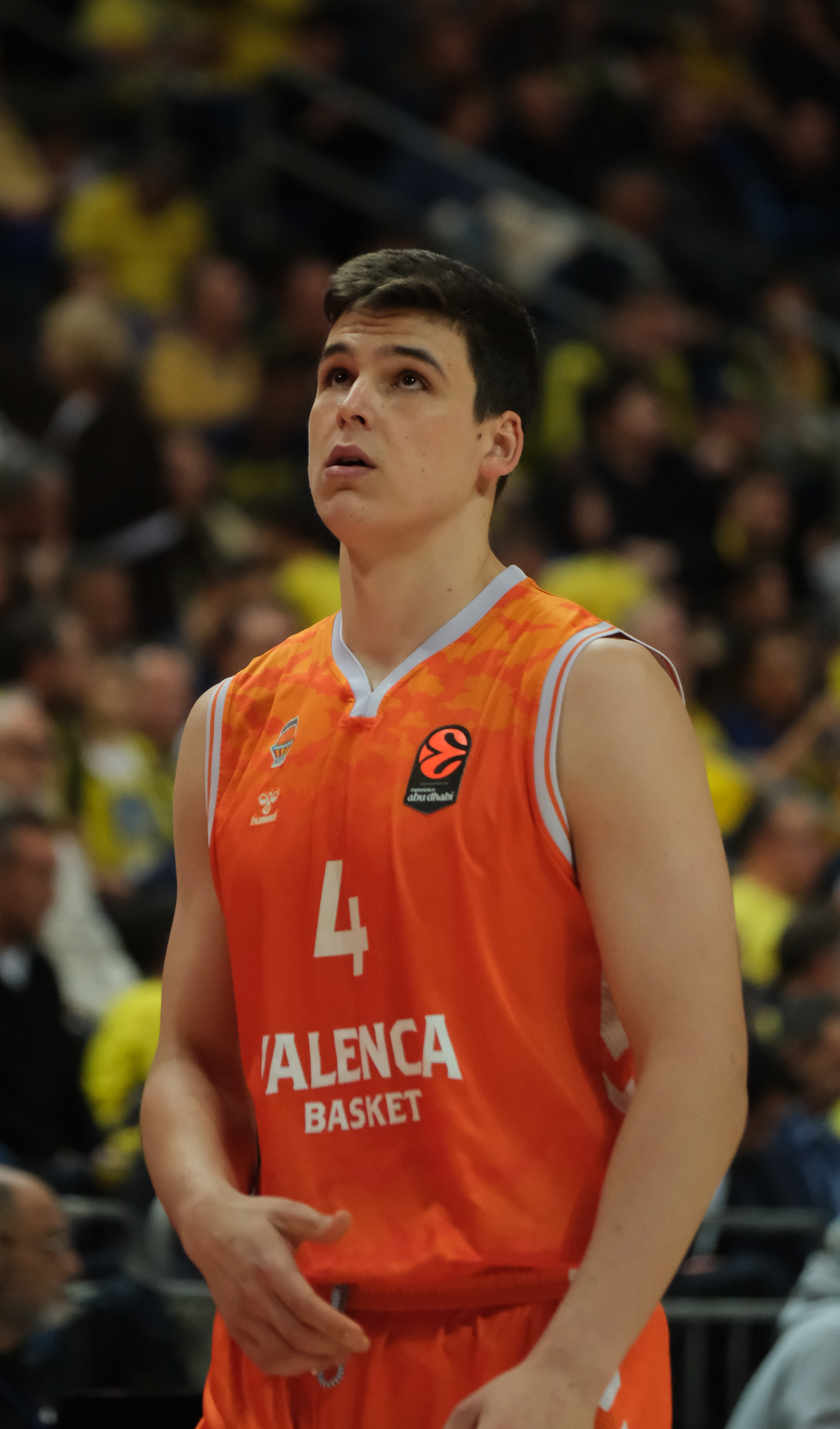
- Pradilla with Valencia Basket 2026

No. 4 – Real Madrid
- Position: Power forward / center
- League: Liga ACB; EuroLeague

Personal information
- Born: 3 January 2001 (age 25) Zaragoza, Spain
- Listed height: 2.05 m (6 ft 9 in)
- Listed weight: 106 kg (234 lb)

Career information
- Playing career: 2017–present

Career history
- 2017–2020: Zaragoza
- 2017–2019: →Olivar
- 2019–2020: →Palencia
- 2020–2026: Valencia
- 2026–present: Real Madrid

Career highlights
- EuroLeague SuperCup champion (2026); Liga ACB champion (2026); Spanish Supercup winner (2025)
Medals
Men's basketball
Representing Spain
EuroBasket
Gold medal – first place	2022 Czech Republic–Georgia–Italy–Germany
FIBA U18 EuroBasket
Gold medal – first place	2019 Greece
FIBA U16 EuroBasket
Gold medal – first place	2016 Poland

Jaime Pradilla Gayán (Note: In this Spanish name, the first or paternal surname is Pradilla and the second or maternal family name is Gayán.) (born 3 January 2001) is a Spanish professional basketball player for Real Madrid of the Liga ACB and the EuroLeague. He also represents Spain national team in international competitions.

== Professional career ==
Born in Zaragoza, Pradilla played in the youth ranks of Basket Zaragoza. At age 16, he made his debut for the farm team Simply Olivar in the Liga EBA, the Spanish fourth-tier.

On 29 September 2018, Pradilla debuted in the Liga ACB with Zaragoza and became the second player born in the 21st century to play in the league. He scored 2 points in 10 minutes in the away loss to Baskonia.

In August 2019, he was sent on loan to Palencia Baloncesto.

In July 2020, Pradilla signed a four-year contract with Valencia Basket.

On July 7, 2026, Pradilla signed a five–year contract with Real Madrid of the Liga ACB and the EuroLeague.

== National team career ==
Pradilla debuted for Spain on 26 November 2021. He also played at EuroBasket 2022 with Spain and won the gold medal.

== Career statistics ==
Legend
GP	Games played	GS	Games started	MPG	Minutes per game
FG%	Field-goal percentage	3P%	3-point field-goal percentage	FT%	Free-throw percentage
RPG	Rebounds per game	APG	Assists per game	SPG	Steals per game
BPG	Blocks per game	PPG	Points per game	PIR	Performance index rating
**Bold**	Career high

=== EuroLeague ===
Year	Team	GP	GS	MPG	FG%	3P%	FT%	RPG	APG	SPG	BPG	PPG	PIR
2020–21	Valencia	17	5	7.2	.513	**.400**	**.778**	1.3	.3	.2	**.1**	2.9	2.4
2022–23	Valencia	30	**8**	13.4	.526	.381	.429	2.1	.6	.2	**.1**	**3.9**	3.7
2023–24	Valencia	**31**	7	**13.6**	**.571**	.300	.583	**3.3**	**.7**	**.5**	.0	3.4	**4.8**
Career		78	20	12.1	.540	.361	.574	2.4	.6	.3	.1	3.5	3.8
