= Alberto Abalde =

Spanish basketball player (born 1995)

- Abalde with Real Madrid in 2026

No. 6 – Real Madrid
- Position: Small forward / shooting guard
- League: Liga ACB; EuroLeague

Personal information
- Born: 15 December 1995 (age 30) Ferrol, Spain
- Listed height: 2.02 m (6 ft 8 in)
- Listed weight: 95 kg (209 lb)

Career information
- NBA draft: 2015: undrafted
- Playing career: 2013–present

Career history
- 2013–2016: Badalona
- 2013–2014: →Prat
- 2016–2020: Valencia
- 2016–2017: →Badalona
- 2020–present: Real Madrid

Career highlights
- EuroLeague champion (2023); EuroLeague SuperCup champion (2026); Euroleague NGT MVP (2013); 3× Liga ACB champion (2022, 2024, 2025); Spanish League All-Young Players Team (2017); All-Liga ACB Second Team (2020); EuroCup champion (2019); Spanish Cup winner (2024); 2× Spanish Supercup champion (2020, 2022)
Medals
Men's basketball
Representing Spain
FIBA Europe Under-20 Championship
Silver medal – second place	2014 Greece	Spain
FIBA Europe Under-18 Championship
Bronze medal – third place	2013 Latvia	Spain

Alberto Abalde Díaz (born 15 December 1995) is a Spanish professional basketball player for Real Madrid of the Liga ACB and the EuroLeague. He has experience on the Spain under-18 and under-20 national teams, having won the bronze and silver medals on the international stage. He also competed with the senior national team at the 2020 Summer Olympics.

== Career ==
After playing in Joventut Badalona's youth setup, Abalde made his debut with the first team in 2013. In that year, Abalde became the MVP of the final of the Nike International Junior Tournament, where Joventut beat Barcelona in the final.

The National Basketball Association released a list noting that Abalde had entered the 2015 NBA draft in late April 2015.

On 17 August 2016, Abalde signed a four-year contract with Valencia Basket, who loaned him one more season to the team from Badalona.

On July 21, 2020, Abalde parted ways with Valencia, after his buyout clause was exercised, and he signed a lucrative five-year deal with EuroLeague powerhouse Real Madrid.

In September 2021, Abalde suffered a quadriceps injury during a game.

In September 2024, Abalde signed a contract extension with Real Madrid. The new contract would keep him on the team until the end of the 2026-2027 season.

In August 2025, Abalde had to leave the LaFamilia training camp ahead of the Eurobasket 2025 after suffering a myofascial tear in the short adductor muscle of his left leg during Spain's match against France.

== Awards and accomplishments ==
=== Spain national team ===
Junior national team

- 2013 FIBA Europe Under-18 Championship: Bronze
- 2014 FIBA Europe Under-20 Championship: Silver

== Career statistics ==
Legend
GP	Games played	GS	Games started	MPG	Minutes per game
FG%	Field-goal percentage	3P%	3-point field-goal percentage	FT%	Free-throw percentage
RPG	Rebounds per game	APG	Assists per game	SPG	Steals per game
BPG	Blocks per game	PPG	Points per game	PIR	Performance index rating
**Bold**	Career high

=== EuroLeague ===
†	Denotes seasons in which Abalde won the EuroLeague

Year	Team	GP	GS	MPG	FG%	3P%	FT%	RPG	APG	SPG	BPG	PPG	PIR
2017–18	Valencia	25	9	19.1	**.497**	**.519**	.870	2.1	1.7	.3	—	7.6	6.9
2019–20	Valencia	23	4	**21.7**	.427	.283	.735	**4.0**	1.7	**.5**	—	**7.8**	**8.9**
2020–21	Real Madrid	**39**	**23**	19.5	.451	.435	.841	2.7	**2.3**	**.5**	—	7.2	8.3
2021–22	Real Madrid	30	19	18.8	.396	.338	.750	3.0	1.5	**.5**	—	6.0	5.4
2022–23†	Real Madrid	24	10	14.4	.302	.250	.667	2.1	1.6	.3	—	2.6	2.9
2023–24	Real Madrid	24	9	12.8	.441	.413	**.875**	1.9	.7	.4	.0	3.6	4.0
Career		165	74	17.9	.431	.386	.778	2.6	1.6	.4	.0	5.9	6.3

=== Individual ===
- Nike International Junior Tournament MVP: (2013)

== Personal life ==
Abalde's sister Tamara is also a professional basketball player.

On June 1, 2023, Abalde got engaged to Carolina.
