= Chuma Okeke =

Nigerian-American basketball player (born 1998)

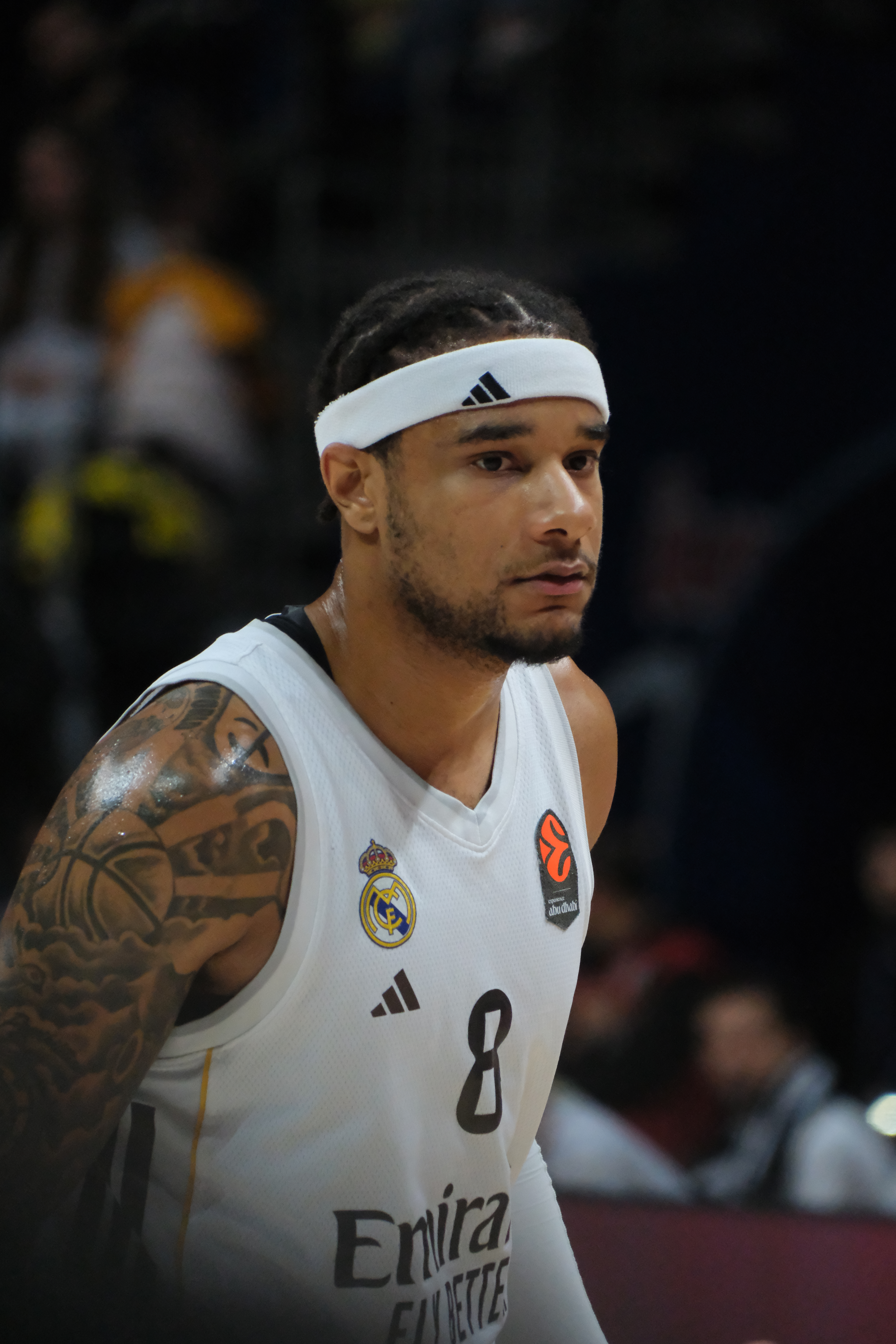
- Okeke with Real Madrid in 2026

No. 8 – Real Madrid
- Position: Power forward / small forward
- League: Liga ACB; EuroLeague

Personal information
- Born: August 18, 1998 (age 28) Atlanta, Georgia, U.S.
- Listed height: 6 ft 7 in (2.01 m)
- Listed weight: 229 lb (104 kg)

Career information
- High school: Westlake (Atlanta, Georgia)
- College: Auburn (2017–2019)
- NBA draft: 2019: 1st round, 16th overall pick
- Drafted by: Orlando Magic
- Playing career: 2020–present

Career history
- 2020–2024: Orlando Magic
- 2023: →Lakeland Magic
- 2024–2025: Westchester Knicks
- 2025: Philadelphia 76ers
- 2025: Cleveland Cavaliers
- 2025–present: Real Madrid

Career highlights
- EuroLeague SuperCup champion (2026); All-NBA G League Third Team (2025); Mr. Georgia Basketball (2017)
- Stats at NBA.com
- Stats at Basketball Reference

Chukwuma Julian "Chuma" Okeke (/ˈtʃuːmə oʊˈkeɪkeɪ/ CHOO-mə oh-KAY-kay; born August 18, 1998) is a Nigerian-American professional basketball player for Real Madrid of the Liga ACB and the EuroLeague. Okeke played college basketball for the Auburn Tigers before being drafted 16th overall in the 2019 NBA draft by the Orlando Magic. He has also played for the Westchester Knicks, Philadelphia 76ers, and Cleveland Cavaliers.

== High school career ==
Okeke attended Westlake High School in Atlanta. As a junior, he won the Georgia Class 6A state championship, scoring 13 points in a 68–58 win over Pebblebrook High School. Okeke was named Mr. Georgia Basketball after his senior season, after he averaged 24.4 points, 15 rebounds and 2.4 steals per game. He was a consensus four-star recruit and was ranked among the top 50 players in his class by some scouting services.

== College career ==
Okeke played for the Auburn Tigers.

In his freshman season, Okeke averaged 7.5 points and 5.8 rebounds per game. He grabbed 197 rebounds in the season, the most by an Auburn freshman since Jeff Moore in 1984–85.

As a sophomore, Okeke averaged 12 points, 6.8 rebounds, 1.8 steals and 1.2 blocks per game while starting in all 38 games. On March 29, 2019, in a Sweet 16 win over top-seeded North Carolina at the 2019 NCAA tournament, he tore his ACL and was injured for the rest of the tournament. Despite his absence, Auburn advanced to its first Final Four appearance in program history.

== Professional career ==
=== Orlando Magic (2020–2024) ===
On June 20, 2019, Okeke was selected with the 16th overall pick by the Orlando Magic in the 2019 NBA draft. Okeke was considered to be a lottery pick in the draft, but after suffering an ACL injury in the 2019 NCAA tournament, he fell to the 16th selection by the Magic, and was referred to by ESPN analyst Mike Schmitz as the "steal of the draft."

During his rehab, Okeke signed a one-year G League contract with the Magic's affiliate in Lakeland with the intent of starting his rookie-scale contract in 2020. At the time, the Magic faced a salary cap crunch that prevented them from adding Okeke's rookie salary to their books. He reported to Lakeland's training camp as a draft rights player on October 28, 2019. However, Okeke never played a game with Lakeland.

On November 16, 2020, the Orlando Magic signed Okeke. In a preseason game against the Atlanta Hawks, Okeke recorded 9 points with 2 three-pointers. On March 26, 2021, he scored a career-high 22 points on 60 percent shooting from the field in a 105–112 loss to the Portland Trail Blazers. Okeke averaged over 12 points after the trade deadline before suffering a season-ending minor ankle injury against the Cleveland Cavaliers. On February 25, 2022, he scored a career-high 26 points in a 119–111 win over the Houston Rockets, surpassing his previous career-high mark set during the 2020–21 season.

=== Westchester Knicks / Philadelphia 76ers (2024–2025) ===
On August 1, 2024, Okeke signed with the New York Knicks, but was waived on September 28. On October 2, he re-signed with the Knicks, but was waived again on October 19. On October 28, he joined the Westchester Knicks. On February 6, 2025, Okeke signed a 10-day contract with the Philadelphia 76ers, and on February 18, he returned to Westchester. On March 15, Okeke signed a second 10-day contract with the 76ers.

=== Cleveland Cavaliers (2025) ===
On April 3, 2025, Okeke signed a deal with the Cleveland Cavaliers. He made two appearances for Cleveland, averaging 2.5 points, two rebounds, and one assist.

=== Real Madrid (2025–present) ===
On July 18, 2025, Okeke signed with Real Madrid of the Liga ACB and the EuroLeague.

== Career statistics ==
Legend
GP	Games played	GS	Games started	MPG	Minutes per game
FG%	Field goal percentage	3P%	3-point field goal percentage	FT%	Free throw percentage
RPG	Rebounds per game	APG	Assists per game	SPG	Steals per game
BPG	Blocks per game	PPG	Points per game	**Bold**	Career high

=== NBA ===
==== Regular season ====
Year	Team	GP	GS	MPG	FG%	3P%	FT%	RPG	APG	SPG	BPG	PPG
2020–21	Orlando	45	19	**25.2**	.417	.348	.750	4.0	**2.2**	1.1	.5	7.8
2021–22	Orlando	**70**	**20**	25.0	.376	.318	**.846**	5.0	1.7	**1.4**	**.6**	**8.6**
2022–23	Orlando	27	8	19.2	.352	.302	.762	3.6	1.4	.7	.4	4.7
2023–24	Orlando	47	8	9.2	.357	.280	.571	1.7	.4	.2	.1	2.3
2024–25	Philadelphia	7	3	24.5	**.545**	**.455**	.667	**6.1**	1.9	.7	.4	6.9
2024–25	Cleveland	2	0	12.5	.286	.167	—	2.0	1.0	.0	.5	2.5
Career		198	58	20.3	.387	.321	.787	3.8	1.5	.9	.4	6.3

==== Playoffs ====
Year	Team	GP	GS	MPG	FG%	3P%	FT%	RPG	APG	SPG	BPG	PPG
2024	Orlando	2	0	**4.9**	**.667**	**.500**	**1.000**	.0	**.5**	.0	.0	**3.0**
2025	Cleveland	**3**	0	4.3	.250	.250	—	.0	.3	.3	.0	1.0
Career		5	0	4.4	.429	.333	1.000	.0	.4	.2	.0	1.8

=== College ===
Year	Team	GP	GS	MPG	FG%	3P%	FT%	RPG	APG	SPG	BPG	PPG
2017–18	Auburn	34	0	21.6	.458	**.391**	.673	5.8	1.1	.7	.7	7.5
2018–19	Auburn	**38**	**38**	**29.1**	**.496**	.387	**.722**	**6.8**	**1.9**	**1.8**	**1.2**	**12.0**
Career		72	38	25.5	.481	.389	.703	6.3	1.5	1.3	1.0	9.9

== Personal life ==
Okeke's father, Chuka Okeke, is from Nigeria.
