= EuroLeague SuperCup MVP =

Annual basketball award

The EuroLeague SuperCup MVP is an annual award given to the "Most Valuable Player" of the EuroLeague SuperCup Final Four tournament. The award is presented by EuroLeague.

== Winners ==
Year	Player	Club	Ref.
2026	(Cape Verde) Edy Tavares	(Spanish Basketball Federation) Real Madrid	

== See also ==
- EuroLeague MVP
- EuroLeague Final Four MVP
- EuroLeague Playoffs MVP
- EuroLeague awards
