= Edy Tavares =

Cape Verdean basketball player (born 1992)

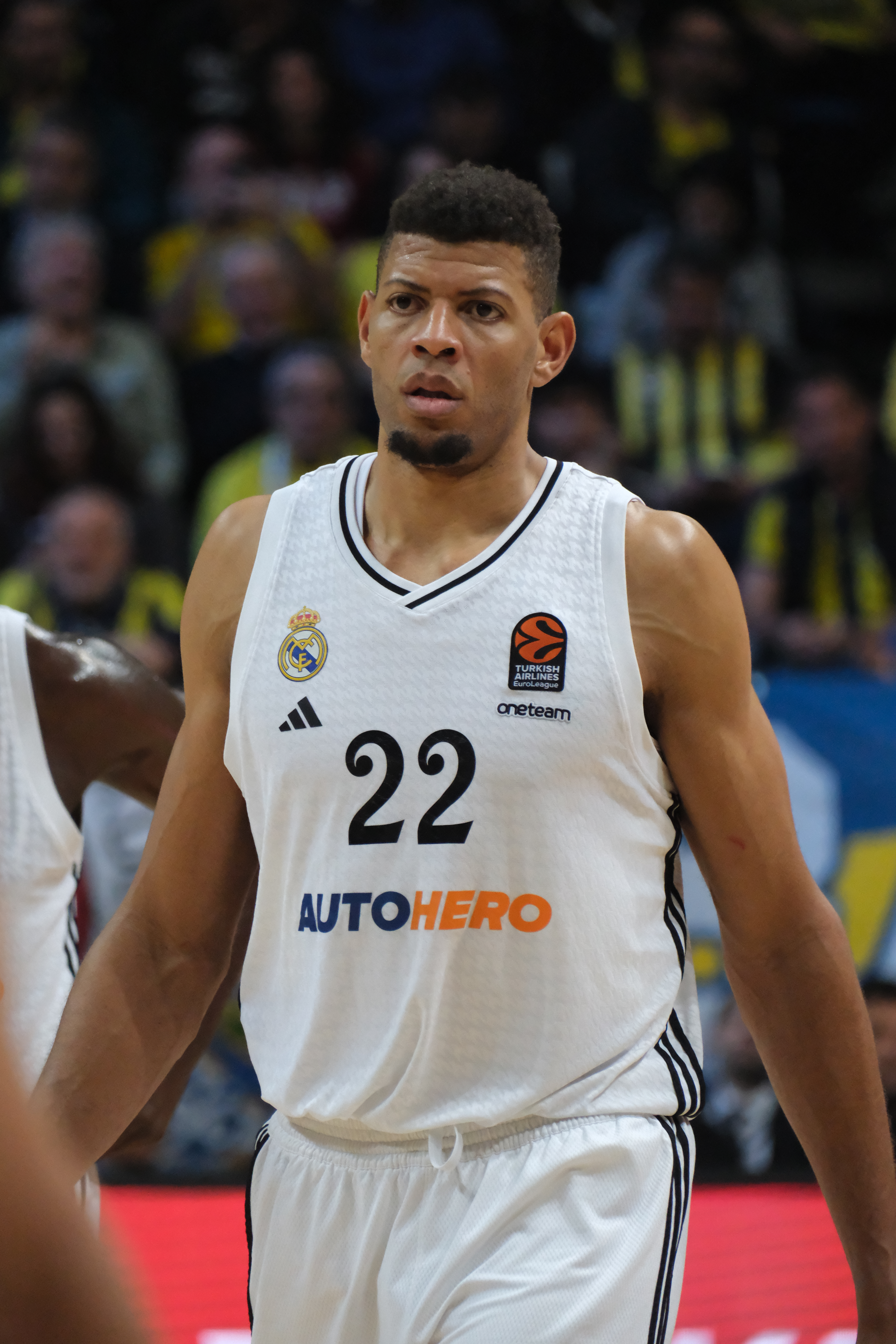
- Tavares with Real Madrid in 2025

No. 22 – Real Madrid
- Position: Center
- League: Liga ACB; EuroLeague

Personal information
- Born: March 22, 1992 (age 34) Maio, Cape Verde
- Listed height: 2.22 m (7 ft 3 in)
- Listed weight: 275 lb (125 kg)

Career information
- NBA draft: 2014: 2nd round, 43rd overall pick
- Drafted by: Atlanta Hawks
- Playing career: 2009–present

Career history
- 2009–2015: Gran Canaria
- 2011–2013: →La Palma
- 2015–2016: Atlanta Hawks
- 2015–2016: →Austin Spurs
- 2015: →Canton Charge
- 2016: →Bakersfield Jam
- 2016–2017: Raptors 905
- 2017: Cleveland Cavaliers
- 2017: Raptors 905
- 2017–present: Real Madrid

Career highlights
- 2× EuroLeague champion (2018, 2023); EuroLeague SuperCup champion (2026); EuroLeague Final Four MVP (2023); 3× All-EuroLeague First Team (2021–2023); 4× All-EuroLeague Second Team (2019, 2024–2026); 3× EuroLeague Best Defender (2019, 2021, 2023); 7× EuroLeague blocks leader (2019–2024, 2026); EuroLeague SuperCup MVP (2026); EuroLeague 25th Anniversary Team (2025); All-EuroCup First Team (2015); 5× Liga ACB champion (2018, 2019, 2022, 2024, 2025); 6× Spanish Supercup winner (2018–2023); Liga ACB Finals MVP (2022); 3× All-Liga ACB First Team (2019, 2021, 2023); 3× All-Liga ACB Second Team (2020, 2022, 2026); 6× Liga ACB Best Defender (2021–2026); 9× Liga ACB blocks leader (2015, 2018, 2019, 2021–2026); Liga ACB rebounding leader (2024); All-Liga ACB Young Players Team (2014); Spanish Supercup MVP (2022); NBA D-League Defensive Player of the Year (2017); All-NBA D-League First Team (2017); NBA D-League All-Defensive Team (2017); NBA D-League All-Star (2017); EuroLeague career stats leaders: EuroLeague all-time rebounds leader; EuroLeague all-time blocks leader
- Stats at NBA.com
- Stats at Basketball Reference

Walter Samuel "Edy" Tavares da Veiga (born March 22, 1992) is a Cape Verdean professional basketball player for Real Madrid of the Liga ACB and the EuroLeague. He was selected with the 43rd overall pick in 2014 NBA draft by the Atlanta Hawks and has played internationally for the Cape Verde national basketball team. Tavares receives praise as a physical phenomenon, standing 7 ft 3 in (2.21 m) tall and possessing a 7 ft 9 in (2.36 m) wingspan.

After being scouted in his hometown, Tavares started playing for Gran Canaria in 2009. He was drafted in the 2014 NBA draft by the Atlanta Hawks where he played one season. In 2017, Tavares signed with Real Madrid where he reached stardom, winning two EuroLeague titles and six All-EuroLeague Team selections, as well as several domestic accolades. Tavares is the EuroLeague's all-time leader in rebounds and blocks.

Tavares guided the Cape Verdean national team to their first-ever World Cup in 2023, and has played at AfroBasket in 2013 and 2021.

== Early life ==
Tavares was born in Cape Verde on the island of Maio. His father was also tall, at 6 ft 8 in (2.03 m), and worked on shipping vessels which caused him to be away for long periods of time. Tavares worked as a cashier in his grandmother's shop after school and played beach football as a hobby. He did not play any basketball until he was 17 years old, and his talent was discovered by a German tourist who was on vacation in Cape Verde in 2009. The tourist set up a meeting between Tavares and his friend, Raúl Rodriguez, who was a Spanish director of the CB Gran Canaria youth academy. After Rodriguez received a photo that showed Tavares' size, they later met in Praia. There, he had his first training; at the time, Tavares was 7 ft 1 in (2.16 m).

He started playing at the Gran Canaria youth academy, where a second under-18 team was created to accommodate Tavares.

== Professional career ==
=== Spain ===
From 2009 to 2011, Tavares played for CB Gran Canaria's junior team in the Liga EBA. In 2011, he was loaned to UB La Palma of the LEB Oro for the 2011–12 season. In 2012, he returned to Gran Canaria and made his Liga ACB debut on January 6, 2013. He also played three games for La Palma in 2012–13 as well.

In April 2013, Tavares declared for the 2013 NBA draft but later withdrew his name and returned to Gran Canaria for the 2013–14 season.

On June 19, 2014, Tavares re-signed with Gran Canaria on a three-year deal, while still remaining eligible for the 2014 NBA draft.

On June 26, 2014, Tavares was selected with the 43rd overall pick in the 2014 NBA draft by the Atlanta Hawks, becoming the first Cape Verdean-born player to be drafted in the NBA. On August 26, 2014, it was announced Tavares would return to Gran Canaria for the 2014–15 season. During their 2014–15 season, Tavares earned All-EuroCup First Team honors.

=== Atlanta Hawks ===
On July 6, 2015, Tavares joined the Atlanta Hawks for the 2015 NBA Summer League. Three days later, he signed a multi-year deal with the Hawks. He made his debut for the Hawks on October 29 recording one point and one rebound in a 112–101 win over the New York Knicks. During his rookie season, using the flexible assignment rule, Tavares received multiple assignments to the Austin Spurs, Canton Charge and Bakersfield Jam of the NBA Development League. On October 31, 2016, he was waived by the Hawks after appearing in one game for the team in the 2016–17 season.

=== Raptors 905 ===
On November 12, 2016, Tavares was acquired by Raptors 905 of the NBA Development League. On February 6, 2017, he was named in the Eastern Conference All-Star team for the 2017 NBA D-League All-Star Game. At the season's end, he was named the recipient of the NBA Development League Defensive Player of the Year Award.

=== Cleveland Cavaliers ===
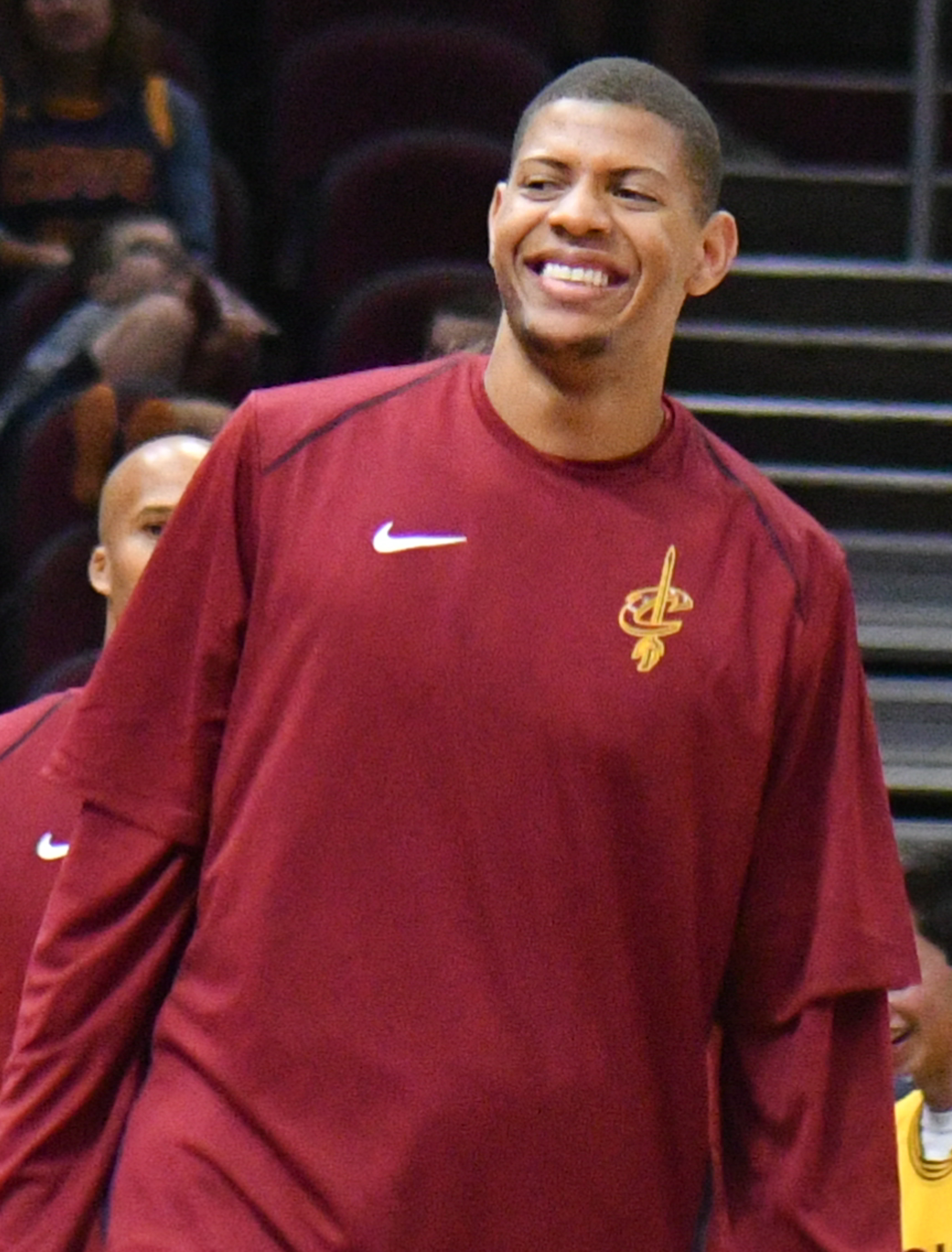
Tavares with the Cleveland Cavaliers in 2017

On April 12, 2017, Tavares signed with the Cleveland Cavaliers. He made his debut for the Cavaliers that night, recording 10 rebounds and six blocks in a 99–83 loss to the Toronto Raptors. Tavares did not play at all in the 2017 playoffs due to a hand injury. The Cavaliers made the Finals, but lost to the Golden State Warriors in five games. On October 11, 2017, Tavares was waived by the Cavaliers.

=== Brief return to Raptors 905 ===
Shortly after getting waived by the Cavaliers, Tavares returned to Raptors 905, ultimately playing only one regular season game for them, scoring 13 points, with 10 rebounds and 3 blocks vs. the Grand Rapids Drive on November 5, 2017.

=== Return to Spain ===
==== 2017–18 season ====
On November 10, 2017, Tavares signed with Real Madrid until the end of the 2019–20 season. In May 2018, Real Madrid won the 2017–18 EuroLeague championship, after defeating Fenerbahçe in the final game with 85–80. Over 17 EuroLeague games, Tavares averaged 6.5 points, 5.3 rebounds and 1.5 blocks per game.

==== 2018–19 season ====
Tavares won the 2018–19 ACB season with Madrid. In the 2018–19 EuroLeague, he was named the EuroLeague Best Defender.

==== 2019–20 season ====
On September 21, 2019, Tavares set an individual record for most blocks in a Spanish Supercup game, with 7 blocks in the semi-final against Fuenlabrada. Real went on to win the Supercup for a second year in a row. The season was suspended due to the COVID-19 pandemic.

==== 2020–21 season ====
In the 2020–21 season, Tavares was named to the All-EuroLeague First Team for the first time in his career. He was also named the EuroLeague Best Defender for the second time in his career.

==== 2021–22 season ====
In the EuroLeague, Tavares made a second straight All-EuroLeague First Team selection.

In June, Tavares won his third Liga ACB championship. On June 19, 2022, he had a double-double of 25 points and 13 rebounds in Game 4 of the finals; the 81–74 win over Barcelona clinched Madrid's title. Tavares was named the ACB Finals MVP after the series in which he averaged 13.2 points, 6.2 rebounds and 20 index rating per game.

==== 2022–23 season ====
Tavares opened the season by helping Madrid win their 5th consecutive Supercopa de España and was named MVP after his 24-point and 12-rebounds performance on against Barcelona in the final. Tavares crowned his season by winning the Euroleague Final 79–78 against Olympiakos, being named EuroLeague Final Four MVP for scoring 13 points and collecting a game-high 10 rebounds.

== National team career ==
Tavares played with the Cape Verde national basketball team at AfroBasket 2013. The following seven years, Tavares did not represent his country due to his club's incompatible dates with the FIBA tournaments. Tavares was again on the roster of Cape Verde for AfroBasket 2021. On August 25, 2021, Tavares recorded 20 points, 18 rebounds and 6 blocks in a shocking overtime victory over Angola; during the last minute of the game, Tavares shattered the backboard with a game-tying dunk, causing a delay in game. He helped his country reach the fourth place in the tournament, while individually he was named to the All-AfroBasket Team as well.

In February 2023, during the last window of the 2023 FIBA Basketball World Cup qualifiers, Tavares joined Cape Verde again and helped the team qualify for its first-ever World Cup. Cape Verde became the smallest nation to ever to qualify for a World Cup.

== Career statistics ==
Legend
GP	Games played	GS	Games started	MPG	Minutes per game
FG%	Field-goal percentage	3P%	3-point field-goal percentage	FT%	Free-throw percentage
RPG	Rebounds per game	APG	Assists per game	SPG	Steals per game
BPG	Blocks per game	PPG	Points per game	PIR	Performance index rating
**Bold**	Career high	†	Won a EuroLeague championship	*	Led the league

=== NBA ===
==== Regular season ====
Year	Team	GP	GS	MPG	FG%	3P%	FT%	RPG	APG	SPG	BPG	PPG
2015–16	Atlanta	**11**	0	6.6	.579	.000	**.375**	1.9	.3	**.1**	.6	2.3
2016–17	Atlanta	1	0	4.0	**1.000**	.000	.000	1.0	.0	.0	.0	2.0
2016–17	Cleveland	1	0	**24.0**	.750	.000	.000	**10.0**	**1.0**	.0	**6.0**	**6.0**
Career		13	0	7.8	.625	.000	.273	2.5	.3	.1	.9	2.5

=== EuroLeague ===
Year	Team	GP	GS	MPG	FG%	3P%	FT%	RPG	APG	SPG	BPG	PPG	PIR
2017–18†	Real Madrid	29	23	17.4	.682*	—	.623	5.3	.5	.4	1.5	6.5	10.6
2018–19	Real Madrid	34	28	19.4	**.794***	—	.632	6.2	.7	.4	1.7*	7.4	13.4
2019–20	Real Madrid	28*	28*	22.9	.680*	.000	.653	7.1	.8	.6	**2.2***	7.2	14.5
2020–21	Real Madrid	36	31	**26.0**	.651	—	.716	**8.0***	1.1	**1.0**	1.8*	**11.4**	18.1
2021–22	Real Madrid	35	34	23.0	.689	.000	.737	7.5	1.0	.9	1.7	10.9	**18.4**
2022–23†	Real Madrid	**40**	38	25.0	.676	—	**.780**	6.9	**1.5**	.9	**2.2***	11.2	18.0
2023–24	Real Madrid	34	33	22.9	.607	—	.738	6.5	1.4	.7	1.5*	9.4	14.9
2024–25	Real Madrid	**40**	37	23.3	.738	—	.722	6.6	1.2	.7	1.2	10.2	15.3
2025–26	Real Madrid	39	**39**	22.8	.689	—	.730	6.6	.6	.6	1.8*	9.6	15.5
Career		315	291	22.7	.685	.000	.717	6.8	1.0	.7	1.7	9.5	15.6

=== Domestic leagues ===
Season	Team	League	GP	MPG	FG%	3P%	FT%	RPG	APG	SPG	BPG	PPG
2011–12	UB La Palma	LEB Oro	21	6.7	.552	.000	.333	1.7	.0	.2	.5	1.6
2012–13	Herbalife Gran Canaria	Liga ACB	12	5.6	.500	.000	.667	2.2	.2	.2	.5	1.5
2013–14	Herbalife Gran Canaria	Liga ACB	35	20.7	.593	.000	.722	6.8	.3	.5	1.5	6.0
2014–15	Herbalife Gran Canaria	Liga ACB	36	22.0	.583	.000	.628	7.9	.3	.8	1.8	8.0
2017–18	Real Madrid	Liga ACB	36	20.6	.674	.000	.582	6.3	.5	.4	2.2	7.9

== See also ==
- List of Cape Verdeans
- List of tallest players in National Basketball Association history
