= Antonis Karagiannidis =

Greek basketball player

- Karagiannidis with Olympiacos in 2026

No. 29 – Olympiacos
- Position: Center / power forward
- League: GBL; EuroLeague

Personal information
- Born: April 13, 2002 (age 24) Thessaloniki, Greece
- Listed height: 6 ft 8 in (2.03 m)
- Listed weight: 230 lb (104 kg)

Career information
- NBA draft: 2024: undrafted
- Playing career: 2020–present

Career history
- 2020–2023: PAOK Thessaloniki
- 2022–2023: →Aias Evosmou
- 2023–2026: Promitheas Patras
- 2026–present: Olympiacos

Career highlights
- Greek Super Cup winner (2026)

Antonis Karagiannidis (Greek: Αντώνης Καραγιαννίδης; born April 13, 2002) is a Greek professional basketball player for Olympiacos of the Greek Basketball League (GBL) and the EuroLeague. Standing at 2.06 metres (6 feet 9 inches) tall, he plays the power forward and center positions.

== Professional career ==
Karagiannidis began playing basketball with PAOK in 2020. During his tenure with PAOK, he saw limited time of action. He was loaned to Aias Evosmou, in order to gain more playing time. On June 23, 2023, he entered the 2023 international G League draft, and was drafted 7th from the Texas Legends. He was waived by the Legends the same year without appearing in a game.

On 2023, he joined Promitheas Patras of the Greek Basketball League. After 2 impressive years with the club, Karagiannidis was brought out by Olympiacos for 500.000 euros, and signed a 5-year deal with the club. He was loaned back to Promitheas Patras for the following season.

== Greek senior national team ==
In September, Karagiannidis also joined the preseason of the Greek national basketball team for the EuroBasket 2025 with Greece. He was eventually cut from the final roster of the team.
