= Trent Forrest =

American basketball player (born 1998)

- Forrest with Fenerbahçe in 2026

No. 11 – Fenerbahçe
- Position: Point guard
- League: BSL; EuroLeague

Personal information
- Born: June 12, 1998 (age 28) Dothan, Alabama, U.S.
- Listed height: 6 ft 5 in (1.96 m)
- Listed weight: 210 lb (95 kg)

Career information
- High school: Chipley (Chipley, Florida)
- College: Florida State (2016–2020)
- NBA draft: 2020: undrafted
- Playing career: 2020–present

Career history
- 2020–2022: Utah Jazz
- 2022–2024: Atlanta Hawks
- 2022–2024: →College Park Skyhawks
- 2024–2026: Baskonia
- 2026–present: Fenerbahçe

Career highlights
- Turkish Super Cup winner (2026); Spanish Cup winner (2026); Spanish Cup MVP (2026); Second-team All-ACC (2020)
- Stats at NBA.com
- Stats at Basketball Reference

Landon Trent Forrest (born June 12, 1998) is an American professional basketball player for Fenerbahçe of the Basketbol Süper Ligi (BSL) and the EuroLeague. He played college basketball for the Florida State Seminoles.

== Early life and high school career ==
Forrest grew up in Chipley, Florida and attended Chipley High School. During his high school career, Forrest scored over 3,000 points. As a senior, he led Chipley to a state championship, scoring 26 points in the title game against Paxton High School. Forrest also participated in Amateur Athletic Union competition with the Alabama Challenge and Georgia Stars. He was ranked in the top 50 of his high school class. Forrest signed with Florida State because he fell in love with the vision of coach Leonard Hamilton. Forrest turned down offers from Miami (Florida), Georgia Tech, Tennessee, UCF and Wichita State.

== College career ==
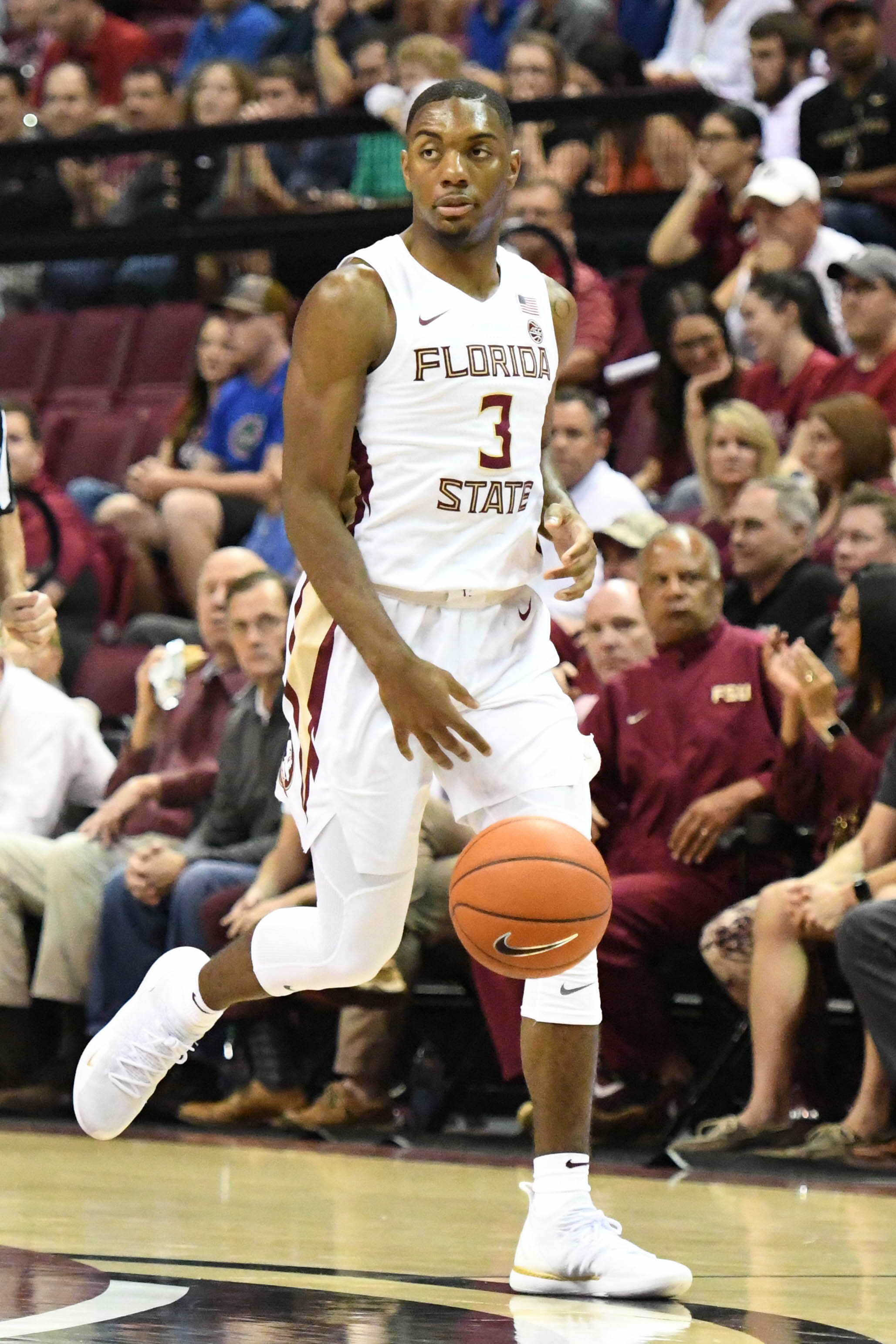
Forrest with Florida State in 2018.

Forrest averaged 4.9 points, 2.7 rebounds, 1.6 assists, and 1.2 steals per game as a freshman, playing backup point guard to Xavier Rathan-Mayes. As a sophomore, Forrest finished fifth on the team in scoring with 7.9 points per game and third in rebounding with 4.9 per game, helping Florida State reach the Elite Eight. During a game against Villanova on November 25, 2018, Forrest had the cartilage torn completely off the bone in his big toe, yet played through pain and did not miss a single game. During the 2019 NCAA Tournament, Forrest scored 20 points and had five rebounds in the Sweet 16 loss to Gonzaga and was named to the West Regional All-Tournament Team. As a junior, Forrest averaged 9.3 points, 4.5 rebounds, and 3.7 assists per game. He graduated from Florida State in December 2019 with a degree in sports management, and he earned the Skip Prosser Award for best scholar-athlete in the ACC since he carried a 3.43 GPA. At the conclusion of the regular season, Forrest was selected to the Second Team All-ACC and to the Defensive Team. He averaged 11.6 points, 4.4 rebounds and 4.0 assists per game as a senior.

== Professional career ==
=== Utah Jazz (2020–2022) ===
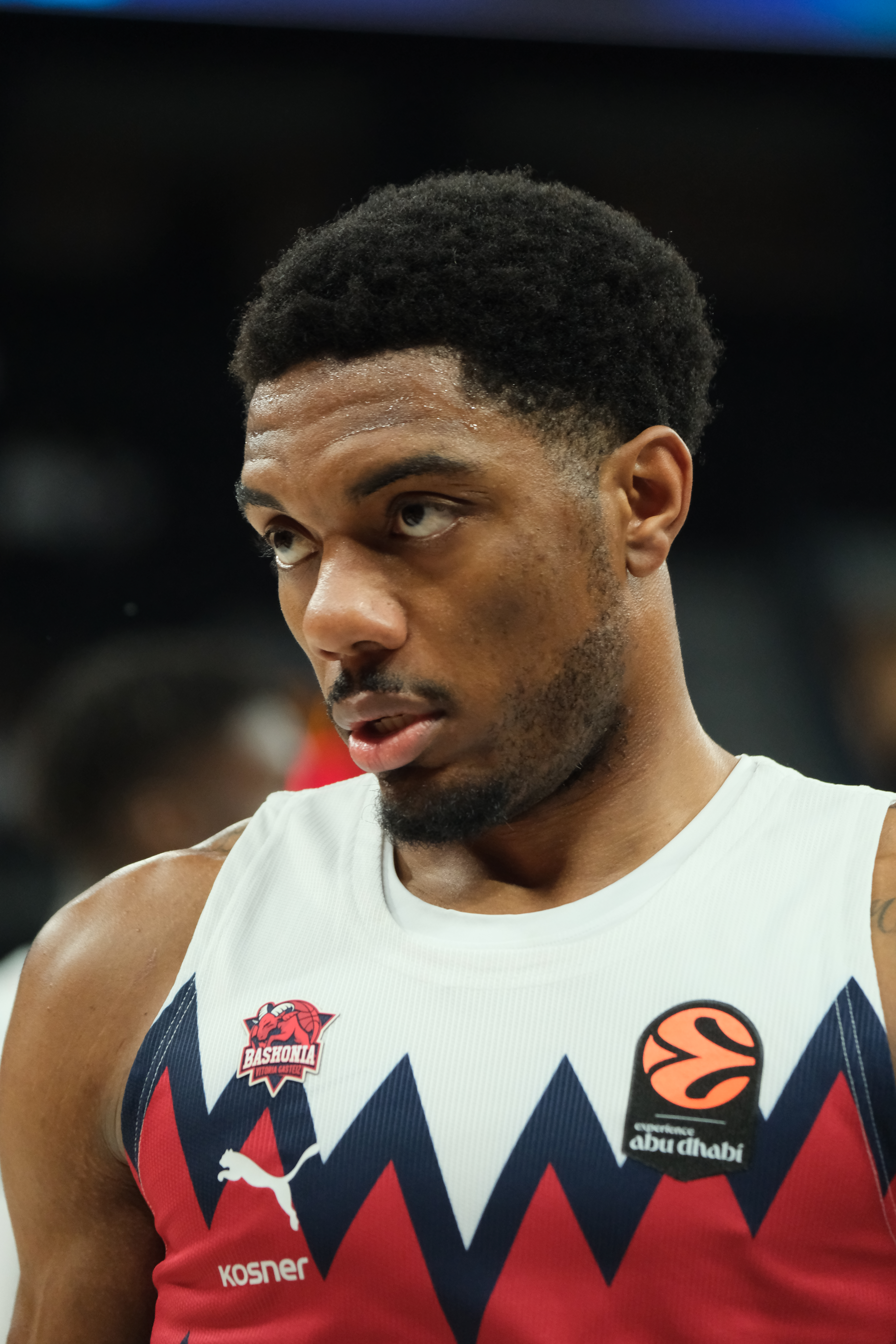
Forrest with Baskonia in 2026

After going undrafted in the 2020 NBA draft, Forrest signed a two-way contract with the Utah Jazz on November 25, 2020.

On August 11, 2021, Forrest signed a second two-way contract and on April 10, 2022, his deal was converted into a standard NBA contract.

=== Atlanta Hawks (2022–2024) ===
On August 8, 2022, Forrest signed a two-way contract with the Atlanta Hawks.

On September 12, 2023, the Atlanta Hawks re-signed Forrest to a two-way contract.

On February 29, 2024, Forrest's contract was converted to a standard NBA contract by the Hawks.

=== Baskonia (2024–2026) ===
On August 8, 2024, Forrest signed with Baskonia of the Spanish Liga ACB.

=== Fenerbahçe (2026–present) ===
On July 8, 2026, Forrest signed a 2+1 year contract with Fenerbahçe of the Basketbol Süper Ligi (BSL).

== Career statistics ==
Legend
| GP | Games played | GS | Games started | MPG | Minutes per game |
| FG% | Field goal percentage | 3P% | 3-point field goal percentage | FT% | Free throw percentage |
| RPG | Rebounds per game | APG | Assists per game | SPG | Steals per game |
| BPG | Blocks per game | PPG | Points per game | **Bold** | Career high |

=== NBA ===
==== Regular season ====
| Year | Team | GP | GS | MPG | FG% | 3P% | FT% | RPG | APG | SPG | BPG | PPG |
|---|---|---|---|---|---|---|---|---|---|---|---|---|
| 2020–21 | Utah | 30 | 0 | 10.1 | .451 | **.192** | **1.000** | 1.5 | 1.5 | .3 | **.1** | 2.9 |
| 2021–22 | Utah | **60** | **6** | **12.8** | **.490** | .185 | .792 | **1.7** | 1.8 | **.5** | **.1** | **3.3** |
| 2022–23 | Atlanta | 23 | 3 | 12.0 | .417 | .000 | .667 | 1.6 | 1.7 | .3 | **.1** | 2.3 |
| 2023–24 | Atlanta | 38 | 0 | 10.9 | .378 | .200 | .765 | 1.3 | 2.4 | .3 | **.1** | 2.2 |
| Career | | 151 | 9 | 11.6 | .444 | .185 | .828 | 1.5 | 1.9 | .4 | .1 | 2.8 |

==== Playoffs ====
| Year | Team | GP | GS | MPG | FG% | 3P% | FT% | RPG | APG | SPG | BPG | PPG |
|---|---|---|---|---|---|---|---|---|---|---|---|---|
| 2021 | Utah | 4 | 0 | 2.5 | .500 | — | — | .0 | .0 | .0 | .0 | 1.0 |
| Career | | 4 | 0 | 2.5 | .500 | — | — | .0 | .0 | .0 | .0 | 1.0 |

=== College ===
| Year | Team | GP | GS | MPG | FG% | 3P% | FT% | RPG | APG | SPG | BPG | PPG |
|---|---|---|---|---|---|---|---|---|---|---|---|---|
| 2016–17 | Florida State | 35 | 0 | 15.4 | .473 | .125 | .676 | 2.7 | 1.6 | 1.2 | .1 | 4.9 |
| 2017–18 | Florida State | 34 | 2 | 25.6 | **.492** | .214 | .697 | **4.9** | **4.1** | 1.6 | .4 | 7.9 |
| 2018–19 | Florida State | **37** | **36** | 29.9 | .439 | .233 | .779 | 4.5 | 3.7 | **1.9** | .2 | 9.3 |
| 2019–20 | Florida State | 31 | 31 | **30.9** | .459 | **.281** | **.822** | 4.4 | 4.0 | **1.9** | **.6** | **11.6** |
| Career | | 137 | 69 | 25.4 | .462 | .248 | .748 | 4.1 | 3.3 | 1.6 | .3 | 8.3 |

== Personal life ==
Both his mother, Barbara Lee, and his father, Lester Forrest, played basketball at Chipola Junior College. His mother is the pastor of the All Things New Worship Center and Forrest played drums in the church. His father is the manager of Gilmore Park for Chipley's recreation department and built the youth basketball program in the town. Forrest has an older brother, Trey, who also played basketball. He is a cousin of basketball player Saben Lee.

== See also ==
- List of All-Atlantic Coast Conference men's basketball teams
