= EuroLeague SuperCup =

European basketball tournament for EuroLeague clubs

- Sport: Basketball
- Founded: 2026; 0 years ago
- Organising body: Euroleague Basketball
- No. of teams: 4
- Continent: Europe
- Most recent champion: (Spanish Basketball Federation) Real Madrid (1st title)
- Most titles: (Spanish Basketball Federation) Real Madrid (1 title)
- Website: euroleaguebasketball.net

The EuroLeague SuperCup or Euroleague Basketball SuperCup is an annual men's professional basketball tournament that serves as the official opening event of the EuroLeague basketball season.

The creation of the tournament was officially approved during the EuroLeague Basketball Shareholders General Assembly in July 2026. The inaugural edition of the competition is to took place from September 18 to 19, 2026, exactly one week before the start of the EuroLeague regular season.

== History ==
As part of EuroLeague Basketball's strategic expansion and financial growth into new markets outside of Europe, the league's executive board proposed the creation of a pre-season tournament. Following final approval by the club-shareholders, the SuperCup became the third active official tournament managed by the EuroLeague Basketball company, alongside the EuroLeague and the EuroCup.

== Format ==
The EuroLeague SuperCup utilizes a Final Four knockout format. The tournament features four invited top-tier clubs competing in two single-elimination semifinal matches, a third-place playoff, and the championship final to crown the winner.

== EuroLeague SuperCup by season ==
EuroLeague SuperCup
Year	Host City	Champion	Score	Runner-up	Third place	Fourth place
2026	(United Arab Emirates) Abu Dhabi	(Spanish Basketball Federation) Real Madrid	93–89	(Hellenic Basketball Federation) Olympiacos	(Turkish Basketball Federation) Fenerbahçe	(United Arab Emirates Basketball Association) Dubai

== See also ==
- EuroLeague
- EuroLeague SuperCup MVP
- European Super Cup
- FIBA Europe SuperCup Women
