= Jaycee Carroll =

American-Azerbaijani basketball player

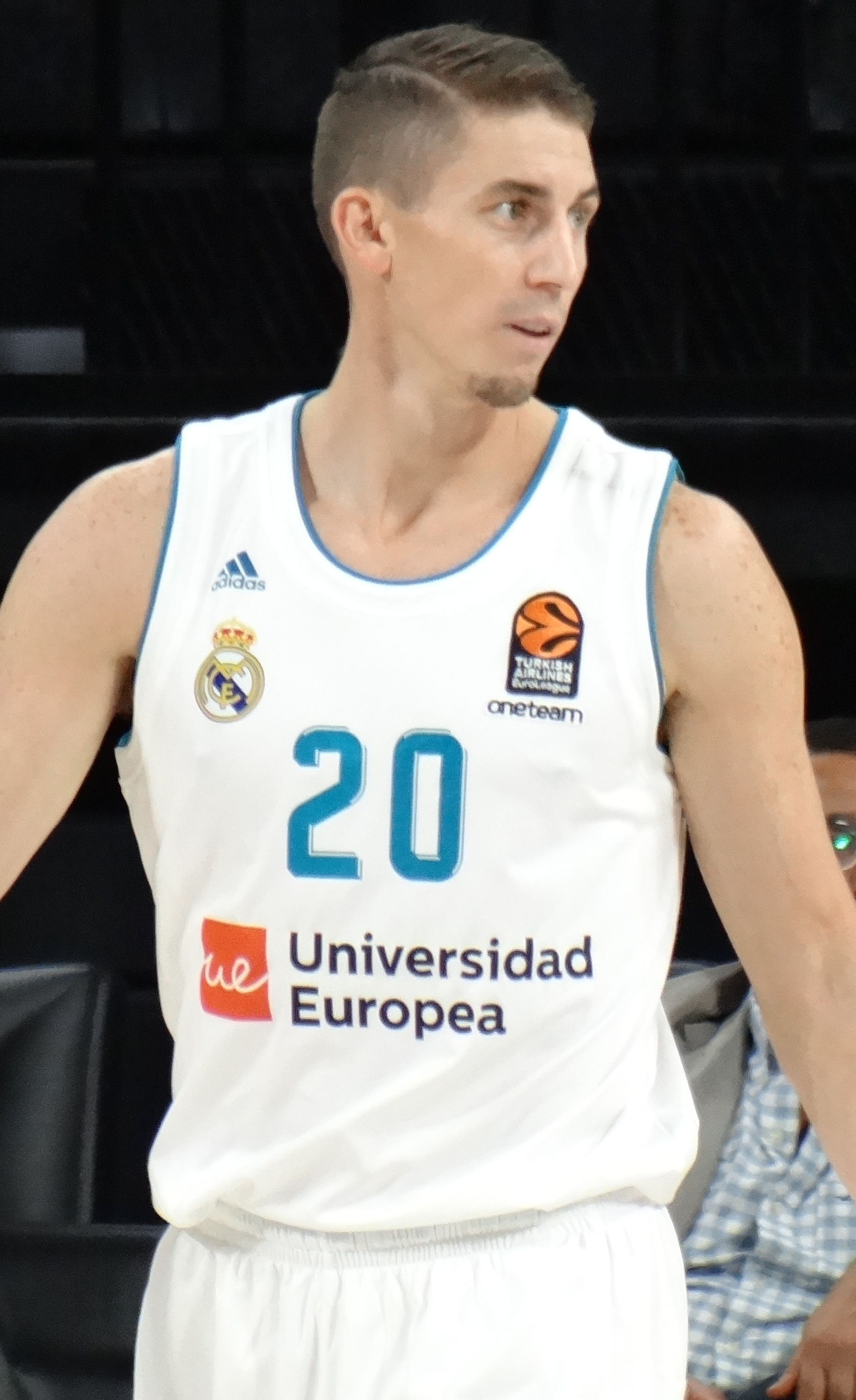
- Carroll with Real Madrid in 2017

Personal information
- Born: April 16, 1983 (age 43) Laramie, Wyoming, U.S.
- Listed height: 6 ft 2 in (1.88 m)
- Listed weight: 181 lb (82 kg)

Career information
- High school: Evanston (Evanston, Wyoming)
- College: Utah State (2004–2008)
- NBA draft: 2008: undrafted
- Playing career: 2008–2021
- Position: Shooting guard

Career history
- 2008–2009: Teramo
- 2009–2011: Gran Canaria
- 2011–2021: Real Madrid

Career highlights
- 2× EuroLeague champion (2015, 2018); 3× EuroLeague 50–40–90 club (2017, 2018, 2021); FIBA Intercontinental Cup champion (2015); 5× Liga ACB champion (2013, 2015, 2016, 2018, 2019); 6× Spanish Cup winner (2012, 2014, 2015, 2016, 2017, 2020); 6× Spanish Supercup winner (2012, 2013, 2014, 2018, 2019, 2020); EuroCup Top Scorer (2011); 2× Liga ACB Top Scorer (2010, 2011); All-Liga ACB Team (2011); Liga ACB Free Throw Percentage leader (2017); 2× Spanish League All-Star Game 3 Point Shootout champion (2015, 2016); 3× Copa Toyota champion (2009–2011); AP Honorable Mention All-American (2008); WAC Player of the Year (2008); 2× First-team All-WAC (2007, 2008); Big West tournament MVP (2005)

Jaycee Don Carroll (born April 16, 1983) is an American-born naturalized Azerbaijani former professional basketball player. He has also represented the senior Azerbaijani national team. While playing college basketball for the Utah State University Aggies, he was known for his scoring prowess, shooting ability, shooting range, and endurance. He has the 2nd highest 3 point field goal percentage in NCAA Division I history. He is the Aggies' all-time scoring leader, and also holds 9 other school records. When he finished his college basketball career, he had the 14th most 3 pointers made, and 52nd most points scored in NCAA DI history.

== High school career ==
As a sophomore at Evanston High School, in Evanston, Wyoming, Carroll earned a spot on the varsity squad. During his junior year, he averaged 27.4 points, 3.3 steals and 2.8 assists per game. To gain these stats Jaycee shot 20,000 shots that summer with his father the coach of the freshman team. In his senior year, he set the state record for points per game at 39.4. Additionally, he averaged 9.1 rebounds and 3.6 steals per game. During a game against Green River, Jaycee scored 56 points, making 14 of 16 three-point attempts. Jaycee was named the Wyoming Gatorade Player of the Year as both a junior and senior. Carroll chose to play college ball at Utah State University, in nearby Logan, Utah. Carroll also ran track and field at Evanston and reached the state championships in multiple events.

== College career ==
As a freshman, after taking a two-year break from basketball, to serve an LDS mission in Chile, Carroll broke numerous school and league records and earned multiple conference and national honors. Carroll was named a Freshman All-American by CollegeInsider.com and Rivals.com. He finished the year scoring 18 points against ninth-ranked Arizona, in the first round of the NCAA tournament. He averaged 14.7 points per game, making 47.6 percent of his three-point shots and 52.3 percent overall. He broke Utah State's freshman single-game scoring record (with 28 points) and season scoring record (with 470 points). Carroll also became the first freshman in the history of the Big West Conference to be named the Most Valuable Player of the league's postseason tournament.

During his sophomore season, Carroll continued to break records. On February 2, 2006, versus New Mexico State, Carroll made 10 three-pointers, which broke both the team and conference records. He averaged 16.3 points per game, converting 45.1 percent of his three-pointers (which led the WAC) and 46.5 percent overall. He scored 21 points, to go along with seven rebounds and three assists, against Washington, in a losing effort in the first round of the NCAA Tournament in March. For the second straight season, he earned second-team all-conference honors. By the end of his sophomore year, Carroll was ranked 33rd all-time in career scoring, and 5th all-time in three-pointers made, at Utah State.

Carroll continued to increase his scoring in his junior year. His 21.3 points per game led the WAC and was 10th in the nation. He also led the WAC in three-point shooting percentage (43.2 percent), shot 52.7 from the field, and pulled down 6.3 rebounds per game. Carroll had a career-high scoring game against New Mexico St., on scoring 44 points in 34 minutes, shooting 12 of 16 from the field, 5 of 7 from three-point range, and 15–15 from the free throw line. The 44-point mark was the most points ever scored by a Utah State Aggie in the Dee Glen Smith Spectrum in a single game. By the end of his junior season, he ranked 7th all-time at USU for career points, with 1,737, needing only 391 points to pass the mark of 2,127 set by Greg Grant in 1986. Carroll was named to the Associated Press All-American team as an honorable mention.

Carroll spent much of the summer prior to his senior year in the gym, practicing his shot. He attempted 23,963 shots, making 20,010 (83%) of them. He was named the WAC Preseason Player of the Year for the 2007–08 season, by both the media and WAC coaches, one of the top 15 seniors by SportsIllustrated.com, and a first-team high-major All-American by Collegehoops.net. Among all active Division 1 college basketball players, Carroll started the season ranked first in career three-point shooting percentage (45.2), third in career scoring and third in career scoring average (17.5) (among returning seniors). Carroll's 32 points versus Utah Valley State on December 20, 2007, propelled him past Wayne Estes, to reach second place on USU's all-time scoring list with 2,009 points. Carroll became Utah State's all-time leading scorer on January 19, 2008, in a game against Idaho, in Logan. He passed Greg Grant on his first basket – a three-pointer – which gave him 2,129 career points. After leading his team to a regular-season conference championship, he was named WAC Player of the Year.

Carroll completed his career at Utah State with a loss to Illinois State in the first round of the NIT. He scored a total 2,507 career points, falling 35 short of breaking the record, at the time held by Keith Van Horn, for all-time leading college basketball scorer in the state of Utah. That Utah state record is now 2,720 career points, currently held by Tyler Haws of BYU. Carroll was selected as one of the best three-point shooters in the nation, and along with 7 others, competed in the 3-Point Shootout at the 2008 NCAA Final Four in San Antonio, Texas. The final event of his collegiate career was the NABC All-Star Game, at the Final Four.

== Professional career ==
Carroll was one of 64 players competing at his first pre NBA draft camp event – the Portsmouth Invitational Tournament – which was held on April 9–12, 2008. After going undrafted, he played for the New Jersey Nets' summer league squad in the 2008 Orlando Pro Summer League camp, earning second-team honors. He also signed contracts to play for the Nets summer team in the 2008 Rocky Mountain Revue in Salt Lake City, and for the Toronto Raptors summer team in the 2008 Las Vegas Summer League.

After the completion of the NBA summer leagues, Carroll signed a contract with Teramo Basket, a team in the Italian first division.

In 2009, he started playing for Gran Canaria in the Spanish ACB. According to his agent: "Jaycee hopes to develop his combo guard skills this year and sign a contract with an NBA team in the near future".

Carroll played for the Boston Celtics summer team in the Orlando Pro Summer League in 2010, and later with the New York Knicks summer team in the NBA Summer League.

=== Real Madrid ===
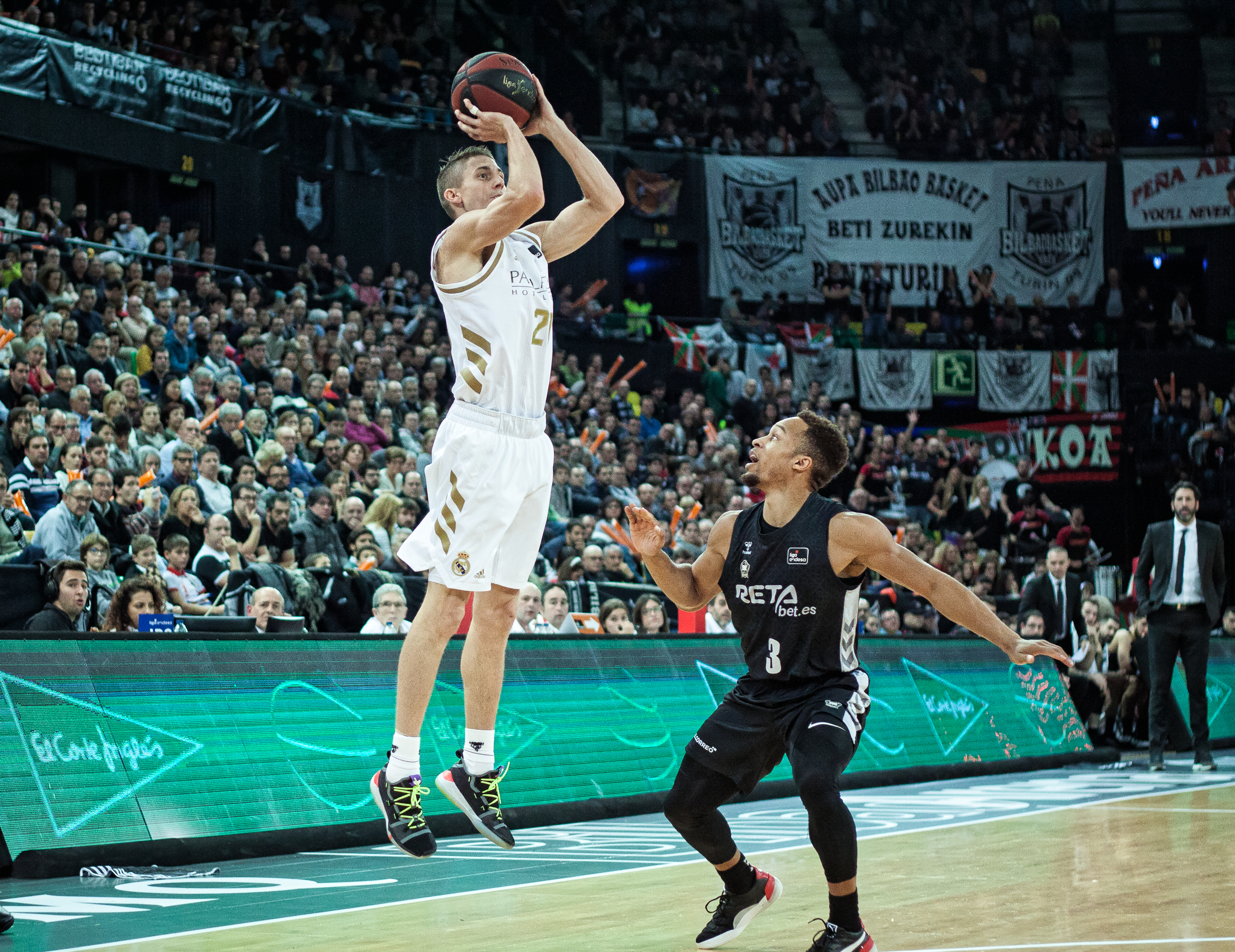
Carroll shooting in 2019

In July 2011, Carroll signed a three-year contract with Real Madrid. On July 22, 2013, he signed a contract extension with Real Madrid, that would keep him in the club until 2017.

In the 2014–15 season, Real Madrid won the EuroLeague championship, after defeating Olympiacos, by a score of 78–59, in the EuroLeague Finals. Real Madrid eventually finished the season by also winning the Spanish League 2014–15 season championship, after a 3–0 series sweep in the Spanish ACB League Finals series against Barcelona. With that title, Real Madrid won the triple crown.

In May 2018, Real Madrid won the 2017–18 EuroLeague championship, after defeating Fenerbahçe Doğuş in the final game 85–80. Over 36 EuroLeague games, Carroll averaged 9.4 points per game.

== National team career ==
Carroll tried to become naturalized by Azerbaijan in the winter of 2011, but problems with bureaucracy kept it from happening then. When rumors started to appear about him gaining naturalization with Montenegro instead, he finally received his Azerbaijani passport in April 2012.

Carroll played with the senior Azerbaijani national basketball team in two games of the FIBA EuroBasket 2013 qualification, where he scored 27 points in the team's 79–96 loss to Sweden, and 26 points in the team's wide margin victory versus Luxembourg (95–77).

== Career statistics ==
Legend
GP	Games played	GS	Games started	MPG	Minutes per game
FG%	Field-goal percentage	3P%	3-point field-goal percentage	FT%	Free-throw percentage
RPG	Rebounds per game	APG	Assists per game	SPG	Steals per game
BPG	Blocks per game	PPG	Points per game	PIR	Performance index rating
**Bold**	Career high

=== EuroLeague ===
†	Denotes season in which Carroll won the EuroLeague
*	Led the league

Year	Team	GP	GS	MPG	FG%	3P%	FT%	RPG	APG	SPG	BPG	PPG	PIR
2011–12	Real Madrid	16	1	**22.4**	.503	**.514**	.865	2.6	.8	.1	**.2**	**14.2**	**11.7**
2012–13	Real Madrid	29	2	21.5	.479	.425	.884	**2.9**	.6	**.6**	.1	11.9	10.0
2013–14	Real Madrid	16	0	13.9	.440	.397	.889	1.6	.8	.5	—	7.1	6.0
2014–15†	Real Madrid	30*	8	17.7	.523	.481	.886	2.0	.7	.5	—	9.6	9.0
2015–16	Real Madrid	27	**11**	17.6	.432	.367	.885	1.5	**.9**	.3	.1	8.4	5.9
2016–17	Real Madrid	**36**	2	17.0	.481	.432	.911	1.5	.8	.2	.1	9.1	6.3
2017–18†	Real Madrid	**36***	5	16.0	**.513**	.458	.957	.9	.5	.3	.2	9.4	7.1
2018–19	Real Madrid	31	3	16.2	.462	.343	**.960***	1.1	.5	.2	.1	9.1	6.2
2019–20	Real Madrid	22	6	13.4	.436	.405	.833	1.2	.5	.2	.1	7.5	4.5
2020–21	Real Madrid	31	8	14.9	.502	.403	.944	1.1	.5	.2	—	9.4	7.1
Career		274	46	17.0	.478	.421	.912	1.6	.6	.3	.1	9.5	7.3

=== Other leagues ===
Year	Team	League	GP	MPG	FG%	3P%	FT%	RPG	APG	SPG	BPG	PPG
2008–09	Teramo Basket	Lega A	34	27.9	.535	.465	.833	4.6	1.1	1.6	.1	15.9
2009–10	Gran Canaria 2014	Liga ACB	36	28.9	.579	.388	.836	3.5	1.8	1.0	.4	18.8
2010–11	Gran Canaria 2014	Liga ACB	36	28.5	.486	.444	.908	2.9	1.3	.9	.2	19.3
2011–12	Real Madrid	Liga ACB	44	22.5	.521	.404	.853	2.5	1.0	.6	.2	11.6
2012–13	Real Madrid	Liga ACB	44	19.0	.564	.439	.836	1.9	.5	.7	.0	8.0
2013–14	Real Madrid	Liga ACB	32	18.0	.517	.408	.886	2.2	.7	.5	.1	9.3
2014–15	Real Madrid	Liga ACB	40	16.8	.537	.445	.791	1.9	.6	.6	.2	9.1

== Awards and accomplishments ==
=== High school and college ===
- 2007–08 Lowe's Second Team All-Senior All-American
- 2007–08 AP All-American Honorable Mention
- 2007–08 Collegehoops.net Second Team High-Major All-American
- 2007–08 NABC All-Star Game
- 2007–08 CollegeInsider.com WAC Player of the Year
- 2007–08 WAC Player of the Year
- 2007–08 WAC First Team All-Conference
- 2007–08 United States Basketball Writers Association All-District VIII Team
- 2007–08 National Association of Basketball Coaches All-District 14 Second Team
- 2007–08 Chip Hilton Player of the Year Finalist
- 2007–08 Lowe's Senior CLASS Award Finalist
- 2007–08 Preseason WAC Player of the Year (both media and coaches)
- 2007–08 Sports Illustrated top-15 Senior
- 2007–08 Collegehoops.net Preseason High-Major All-American
- 2006–07 AP All-American Honorable Mention
- 2006–07 WAC First Team All-Conference
- 2006–07 United States Basketball Writers Association All-District VIII Team
- 2006–07 National Association of Basketball Coaches All-District 14 Second Team
- 2005–06 WAC Second Team All-Conference
- 2004–05 Rivals.com Freshman All-American
- 2004–05 CollegeInsider.com Freshman All-American
- 2004–05 Big West Conference tournament MVP
- 2004–05 Big West Second Team All-Conference
- 2004–05 Big West Freshman of the Year
- Wyoming High School Player of the Year (twice)

=== Pro career ===
- 2012 Spanish King's Cup: Winner
- 2012 Spanish Supercup: Winner
- 2012–13 Spanish League: Champion
- 2013 Spanish Supercup: Winner
- 2014 Spanish King's Cup: Winner
- 2014 Spanish Supercup: Winner
- 2015 Spanish King's Cup: Winner
- 2014–15 EuroLeague: Champion
- 2014–15 Spanish League: Champion
- 2015 FIBA Intercontinental Cup: Champion
- 2016 Spanish King's Cup: Winner

== See also ==
- List of people from Laramie, Wyoming
