= Pablo Laso =

Spanish basketball player and coach

- Laso coaching Anadolu Efes in 2026

Anadolu Efes
- Title: Head coach
- League: BSL; EuroLeague

Personal information
- Born: 13 October 1967 (age 59) Vitoria-Gasteiz, Spain
- Listed height: 5 ft 10 in (1.78 m)
- Listed weight: 180 lb (82 kg)

Career information
- NBA draft: 1989: undrafted
- Playing career: 1984–2003
- Position: Point guard
- Coaching career: 2003–present

Career history

Playing
- 1984–1995: Baskonia
- 1995–1997: Real Madrid
- 1998–1999: Pallacanestro Trieste
- 1999: Baloncesto Málaga
- 1999–2002: Girona
- 2002: Lleida Bàsquet
- 2003: Valladolid

Coaching
- 2003–2004: AB Castelló
- 2004–2005: Pamesa Valencia
- 2006–2007: Cantabria Baloncesto
- 2007–2011: Gipuzkoa
- 2011–2022: Real Madrid
- 2023–2024: Bayern Munich
- 2024–2025: Baskonia
- 2025–present: Anadolu Efes

Career highlights
- As player: FIBA Saporta Cup champion (1997); Spanish Cup winner (1995); Spanish Cup MVP (1995); Spanish League career stats leaders: Spanish League all-time leader in steals; As head coach: FIBA Intercontinental Cup champion (2015); 2× EuroLeague champion (2015, 2018); 6× Liga ACB champion (2013, 2015, 2016, 2018, 2019, 2022); Basketball Bundesliga champion (2024); 6× Spanish Cup winner (2012, 2014–2017, 2020); German Cup winner (2024); 7× Spanish Supercup winner (2012–2014, 2018–2021); VTB United League Supercup winner (2026); 2× EuroLeague Coach of the Year (2015, 2018); 5× Liga ACB Coach of the Year (2013–2015, 2018, 2021); 4× AEEB Spanish Coach of the Year (2013, 2015, 2016, 2018)

Pablo Laso Biurrun (born 13 October 1967) is a Spanish professional basketball coach and former player. He is currently the head coach for Anadolu Efes of the BSL and EuroLeague. He was the head coach of Real Madrid for eleven seasons from 2011 to 2022, guiding them to two EuroLeague championships and six ACB titles. As a player, he was a prominent point guard in Spain and Italy.

== Professional playing career ==
=== Club career ===
After 11 seasons with Baskonia he signed for Real Madrid in 1995. Real Madrid paid Baskonia 35 million pesetas (approximately 230,000 euros) for the transfer.

Laso played 17,378 minutes (4th most) in 624 games (9th most) in the Liga ACB (the top-tier level Spanish League). He holds the ACB records for most career assists (2,896) and most career steals (1,219).

He won the 1995 edition of the Spanish Cup, and won the Most Valuable Player award of the tournament. He also won the championship of the FIBA Saporta Cup's 1996–97 season.

=== National team career ===
Laso played in 61 games with the senior Spanish national team. He played at the EuroBasket 1989, the 1994 FIBA World Championship, and the EuroBasket 1995.

== Professional coaching career ==
In 2008, Laso led Bruesa GBC, to achieve a league promotion to the Spanish top-tier level Liga ACB

Laso led Real Madrid to win the EuroLeague championships of the 2014–15 season, and the 2017–18 season. He also led Real Madrid to win 6 Spanish League championships (2013, 2015, 2016, 2018, 2019, 2022), 5 Spanish Cups (2012, 2014, 2015, 2016, 2017, 2020), and 6 Spanish Supercups (2012, 2013, 2014, 2018, 2019, 2020).

Laso also led Real Madrid to win the championship of the 2015 edition of the FIBA Intercontinental Cup.

During the 2014 ACB Playoffs Real Madrid played a rematch of the 2014 Euroleague Final Four semifinal against FC Barcelona Bàsquet. Laso suffered an Achilles tendon rupture after Madrid's loss in the first game of the series. The coach chose to coach Game 2 on crutches, which resulted in a Madrid victory. Laso opted for surgery and returned to Real's sideline in a wheelchair in game 4. The coach would be ejected from the game by referees early in the second half and was wheeled from the arena escorted by security. Barcelona would go on to win the ACB championship 3-1.

In July 2022, Madrid parted ways with Laso for medical reasons. He had suffered a heart attack during the 2022 ACB Playoffs that forced him to stay in the hospital for two days. Real had consulted doctors and cardiologists who said it would be a risk for Laso's health if he continued his job as head coach.

On June 12, 2023, he signed with FC Bayern Munich of the German Basketball Bundesliga. While Bayern struggled in the Euroleague -- finishing with 15th place, Bayern won the domestic double under Laso -- winning their first Bundesliga since 2019.

On June 28, 2024, he signed with Saski Baskonia of the Spanish Liga ACB. He was fired during the summer after a year for Baskonia.

On December 13, 2025, he took over Anadolu Efes of the BSL and EuroLeague after the dismissal of Igor Kokoškov.

== Head coaching record ==
Legend
G	Games coached	W	Games won	L	Games lost	W–L %	Win-loss %

Note: The EuroLeague is not the only competition in which the team played during the season. He also coached in domestic competition, and regional competition if applicable.

=== EuroLeague ===
Team	Year	G	W	L	W–L%	Result
Real Madrid	2011–12	16	12	4	.750	Eliminated in Top 16 stage
Real Madrid	2012–13	29	21	8	.724	Lost in the final game
Real Madrid	2013–14	31	25	6	.806	Lost in the final game
Real Madrid	2014–15	30	24	6	.800	Won Euroleague Championship
Real Madrid	2015–16	27	12	15	.444	Eliminated in quarterfinals
Real Madrid	2016–17	36	26	10	.722	Lost in 3rd place game
Real Madrid	2017–18	36	24	12	.667	Won EuroLeague Championship
Real Madrid	2018–19	35	26	9	.743	Won in 3rd place game
Real Madrid	2020–21	39	22	17	.564	Eliminated in quarterfinals
Real Madrid	2021–22	31	21	10	.677	Lost in the final game
Bayern Munich	2023–24	34	13	21	.382	Eliminated in the regular season
Baskonia	2024–25	34	14	20	.412	Eliminated in the regular season
Anadolu Efes	2025–26	22	6	16	.273	Eliminated in the regular season
Career		400	246	154	.615	

== Honours ==
=== As player ===
- Copa del Rey (Spanish Cup): (1)
  - 1995
- FIBA Saporta Cup: (1)
  - 1997

=== As head coach ===
- Liga ACB (Spanish League): (6)
  - 2013, 2015, 2016, 2018, 2019, 2022
- Copa del Rey (Spanish Cup): (6)
  - 2012, 2014, 2015, 2016, 2017, 2020
- Supercopa de España de Baloncesto (Spanish Supercup): (6)
  - 2012, 2013, 2014, 2018, 2019, 2020
- Basketball Bundesliga (German League): (1)
  - 2024
- BBL-Pokal (German Cup): (1)
  - 2024
- EuroLeague: (2)
  - 2015, 2018
- FIBA Intercontinental Cup: (1)
  - 2015

== See also ==
- List of EuroLeague-winning head coaches
