= 2019 Supercopa de España de Baloncesto =

2019 Supercopa Endesa^{1}
Tournament details
- Country: Spain
- City: Madrid
- Venue(s): WiZink Center
- Dates: 21–22 September 2019
- Teams: 4
- Defending champions: Real Madrid

Final positions
- Champions: Real Madrid (6th title)
- Runner-up: Barça
- Semifinalists: Valencia Basket; Montakit Fuenlabrada

Tournament statistics
- Matches played: 3
- Attendance: 35,219 (11,740 per match)

Awards
- MVP: Facundo Campazzo
- ^{1} Sponsored name, referring to Endesa.

The 2019 Supercopa de España de Baloncesto, also known as Supercopa Endesa for sponsorship reasons, was the 16th edition of the Supercopa de España de Baloncesto, an annual basketball competition for clubs in the Spanish basketball league system that were successful in its major competitions in the preceding season. Real Madrid defended successfully the title and conquered its second consecutive Supercup, 6th overall.

The final between Real Madrid and Barça beat the record attendance for a supercup match with 12,348 spectators. Also, the tournament beat the accumulated attendance record for a supercup edition with 35,219 accumulated spectators after three games (11,740 spectators per game).

All times were in Central European Summer Time (UTC+02:00).

== Qualification ==
The tournament featured the host team, the winners from the two major competitions (2018–19 Liga Endesa and 2019 Copa del Rey) and the winner from the 2018–19 EuroCup.

=== Qualified teams ===
The following four teams qualified for the tournament.

Team	Method of qualification	Appearance	Last appearance as
Montakit Fuenlabrada	Host team	1st	Debut
Real Madrid	2018–19 Liga Endesa champion	14th	2018 winners
Barça	2019 Copa del Rey champion	14th	2018 semifinalists
Valencia Basket	2018–19 EuroCup champion	5th	2017 winners

== Venue ==
On July 24, 2018, ACB selected and announced Madrid to host the supercup in September 2019. The former building, which was built in 1960, was destroyed by a fire in 2001. Architects Enrique Hermoso and Paloma Huidobro projected a High-Tech style new arena that was built at the same location between 2002 and 2005. The arena hosted two major international basketball events in the first decade of the 21st century - the knockout stage of EuroBasket 2007 and the 2008 Euroleague Final Four. It also hosted the final stage of the Copa del Rey of basketball in 2006, 2009, 2011 and 2019. The arena was the finals venue for the 2014 World Cup and the 2015 Euroleague Final Four.

Madrid	2019 Supercopa de España de Baloncesto (Spain)
WiZink Center	2019 Supercopa de España de Baloncesto (Spain)
Capacity: 13,109	2019 Supercopa de España de Baloncesto (Spain)

== Draw ==
The draw was held on 2 September 2020 in Madrid, Spain. Real Madrid as the league champion and Barça as cup champion were the seeded teams.

== Bracket ==
Semifinals
Real Madrid	116
Montakit Fuenlabrada	61
Barça	71
Valencia Basket	65

Final
Real Madrid	89
Barça	79

== Semifinals ==
=== Barça vs. Valencia Basket ===
21 September 2019	Barça	71–65	Valencia Basket	Madrid
18:30	Scoring by quarter: 15–15, 14–17, 20–17, 22–16
	Pts: Higgins 15; Rebs: Mirotić, Tomić 5 Asts: Pangos 5 PIR: Claver 15	Boxscore	Pts: Marinković 17; Rebs: Dubljević 6 Asts: Vives 5 PIR: Marinković 12	Arena: WiZink Center; Attendance: 11,018; Referees: Daniel Hierrezuelo, Carlos Cortés, Raúl Zamorano

Starters:			Pts	Reb	Ast
G	3	(Canada) Kevin Pangos	5	3	5
G	22	(United States) Cory Higgins	15	2	3
F	30	(Spain) Víctor Claver	11	4	2
F	33	(Spain) Nikola Mirotić	14	5	0
C	44	(Croatia) Ante Tomić	3	5	1
Reserves:					
F	0	(Uganda) Brandon Davies	6	4	1
F	8	(Hungary) Ádám Hanga	0	1	0
F	10	(Latvia) Rolands Šmits	0	0	0
C	14	(Ukraine) Artem Pustovyi	DNP		
F	18	(Spain) Pierre Oriola	0	0	0
G	23	(United States) Malcolm Delaney	8	3	2
G	24	(Slovakia) Kyle Kuric	9	2	0
Head coach:
(Serbia) Svetislav Pešić

Barça	Valencia

Barça	Statistics	Valencia
18/38 (47%)	2 point field goals	15/26 (57%)
8/24 (33%)	3 point field goals	11/30 (36%)
11/15 (73%)	Free throws	2/2 (100%)
36	Rebounds	29
14	Assists	15
8	Steals	6
14	Turnovers	20
2	Blocks	2

Starters:			Pts	Reb	Ast
F	6	(Spain) Alberto Abalde	4	5	1
G	9	(Belgium) Sam Van Rossom	7	2	2
F	12	(Australia) Brock Motum	10	2	0
C	14	(Montenegro) Bojan Dubljević	0	6	4
F	30	(Spain) Joan Sastre	0	1	1
Reserves:					
F	2	(Serbia) Vanja Marinković	17	0	0
G	3	(United States) Jordan Loyd	7	2	1
C	7	(France) Louis Labeyrie	5	2	0
C	10	(United States) Mike Tobey	9	3	0
G	16	(Spain) Guillem Vives	3	2	5
F	19	(Spain) Fernando San Emeterio	0	0	0
F	42	(Canada) Aaron Doornekamp	3	1	1
Head coach:
(Spain) Jaume Ponsarnau

=== Real Madrid vs. Montakit Fuenlabrada ===
21 September 2019	Real Madrid	116–61	Montakit Fuenlabrada	Madrid
21:00	Scoring by quarter: 28–11, 24–10, 31–22, 33–18
	Pts: Carroll 18; Rebs: Tavares 10; Asts: Campazzo 9 PIR: Tavares 27	Boxscore	Pts: Bobrov 11; Rebs: Mockevičius 12; Asts: Rowland 5 PIR: Mockevičius 12	Arena: WiZink Center; Attendance: 11,853; Referees: Carlos Peruga, Fernando Calatrava, Jordi Aliaga

Starters:			Pts	Reb	Ast
F	3	(Slovenia) Anthony Randolph	12	2	0
G	7	(Argentina) Facundo Campazzo	12	6	9
G	20	(Azerbaijan) Jaycee Carroll	18	1	1
C	22	(Cape Verde) Edy Tavares	8	10	2
F	44	(Sweden) Jeffery Taylor	5	1	6
Reserves:					
G	1	(France) Fabien Causeur	5	1	4
F	5	(Spain) Rudy Fernández	9	1	0
G	8	(Argentina) Nicolás Laprovíttola	8	3	5
F	9	(Spain) Felipe Reyes	9	0	0
F	14	(Argentina) Gabriel Deck	9	1	2
G	23	(Spain) Sergio Llull	8	2	2
C	25	(United States) Jordan Mickey	13	7	1
Head coach:
(Spain) Pablo Laso

Madrid	Fuenlabrada

Madrid	Statistics	Fuenlabrada
21/37 (56%)	2 point field goals	22/53 (41%)
19/26 (73%)	3 point field goals	3/24 (12%)
17/21 (80%)	Free throws	8/10 (80%)
39	Rebounds	38
32	Assists	11
7	Steals	8
12	Turnovers	18
8	Blocks	2

Starters:			Pts	Reb	Ast
G	0	(Bulgaria) E. J. Rowland	7	0	5
G	3	(United States) Karvel Anderson	8	1	0
F	21	(Belgium) Pierre-Antoine Gillet	0	0	0
F	31	(Democratic Republic of the Congo) Christian Eyenga	8	3	1
C	55	(Lithuania) Egidijus Mockevičius	8	12	1
Reserves:					
F	4	(Ukraine) Vyacheslav Bobrov	11	3	0
G	7	(Spain) Tomás Bellas	2	2	1
G	9	(Spain) Francis Alonso	3	3	2
C	12	(Spain) Osas Ehigiator	0	1	1
G	27	(Spain) Marc García	7	2	0
F	33	(Bosnia and Herzegovina) Njegoš Sikiraš	7	5	0
F	34	(United States) DeAndre Liggins	DNP		
Head coach:
(Spain) Jota Cuspinera

== Final ==
22 September 2019	Real Madrid	89–79	Barça	Madrid
19:00	Scoring by quarter: 21–20, 27–13, 21–30, 20–16
	Pts: Campazzo 16; Rebs: Mickey 7 Asts: Campazzo 5 PIR: Campazzo 22	Boxscore	Pts: Davies 23; Rebs: Mirotić 6 Asts: Pangos 5 PIR: Davies 20	Arena: WiZink Center; Attendance: 12,348; Referees: Daniel Hierrezuelo, Carlos Peruga, Fernando Calatrava

Starters:			Pts	Reb	Ast
F	3	(Slovenia) Anthony Randolph	2	2	0
G	7	(Argentina) Facundo Campazzo	16	5	5
G	20	(Azerbaijan) Jaycee Carroll	9	4	0
C	22	(Cape Verde) Edy Tavares	5	6	0
F	44	(Sweden) Jeffery Taylor	8	2	0
Reserves:					
G	1	(France) Fabien Causeur	DNP		
F	5	(Spain) Rudy Fernández	10	4	1
G	8	(Argentina) Nicolás Laprovíttola	9	1	2
F	9	(Spain) Felipe Reyes	2	1	0
F	14	(Argentina) Gabriel Deck	9	5	1
G	23	(Spain) Sergio Llull	9	1	3
C	25	(United States) Jordan Mickey	10	7	2
Head coach:
(Spain) Pablo Laso

Madrid	Barça

Madrid	Statistics	Barça
20/37 (54%)	2 point field goals	20/43 (46%)
8/28 (28%)	3 point field goals	5/25 (20%)
25/29 (86%)	Free throws	24/29 (82%)
43	Rebounds	40
14	Assists	14
4	Steals	3
9	Turnovers	9
1	Blocks	3

Starters:			Pts	Reb	Ast
F	0	(Uganda) Brandon Davies	23	4	3
G	3	(Canada) Kevin Pangos	2	1	5
G	22	(United States) Cory Higgins	13	5	1
F	30	(Spain) Víctor Claver	3	5	1
F	33	(Spain) Nikola Mirotić	14	6	0
Reserves:					
F	8	(Hungary) Ádám Hanga	3	3	0
F	10	(Latvia) Rolands Šmits	2	1	0
C	14	(Ukraine) Artem Pustovyi	DNP		
F	18	(Spain) Pierre Oriola	2	3	0
G	23	(United States) Malcolm Delaney	13	3	2
G	24	(Slovakia) Kyle Kuric	0	1	2
C	44	(Croatia) Ante Tomić	4	4	0
Head coach:
(Serbia) Svetislav Pešić

2019 Supercopa Endesa champions
Real Madrid
6th title
