= 2017 Copa del Rey de Baloncesto =

81st edition of the Spanish King's Basketball Cup

Tournament details
- Arena: Fernando Buesa Arena; Vitoria-Gasteiz
- Dates: 16–19 February 2017

Final positions
- Champions: Real Madrid (27th title)
- Runners-up: Valencia Basket

Awards and statistics
- MVP: (Spain) Sergio Llull

The 2017 Copa del Rey de Baloncesto is the 81st edition of the Spanish King's Basketball Cup. It is managed by the ACB and is held in Vitoria-Gasteiz, in the Fernando Buesa Arena on February 16–19, 2017. Real Madrid defended successfully the title and conquered its fourth consecutive cup, 27th overall.

The semifinal between Baskonia and Real Madrid beat the record attendance for a Copa del Rey match with 15,465 spectators. Also, the tournament beat the accumulated attendance record for a Copa del Rey edition with 103,968 accumulated spectators after seven games (14,853 spectators per game).

== Qualified teams ==
The seven first qualified after the first half of the 2016–17 ACB regular season qualified to the tournament. As Baskonia, host team, finished between the seven first teams, the eighth qualified joined the Copa del Rey.

| Pos | Team | Pld | W | L | PF | PA | PD | Seeding |
|---|---|---|---|---|---|---|---|---|
| 1 | Real Madrid | 16 | 13 | 3 | 1418 | 1234 | +184 | Qualified as seeded teams |
| 2 | Valencia Basket | 16 | 12 | 4 | 1337 | 1191 | +146 | Qualified as seeded teams |
| 3 | Iberostar Tenerife | 16 | 12 | 4 | 1258 | 1148 | +110 | Qualified as seeded teams |
| 4 | FC Barcelona Lassa | 16 | 12 | 4 | 1334 | 1246 | +88 | Qualified as seeded teams |
| 5 | Baskonia (H) | 16 | 11 | 5 | 1349 | 1229 | +120 | |
| 6 | Herbalife Gran Canaria | 16 | 10 | 6 | 1356 | 1222 | +134 | |
| 7 | Unicaja | 16 | 10 | 6 | 1351 | 1273 | +78 | |
| 8 | MoraBanc Andorra | 16 | 9 | 7 | 1355 | 1359 | −4 | |

Source: ACB
(H) Hosts

== Draw ==
The 2017 Copa del Rey de Baloncesto was drawn on 16 January 2017 at approximately 12:00 CET and was broadcast live on YouTube and on TV in many countries. The seeded teams were paired in the quarterfinals with the non-seeded teams. There were not any restrictions for the draw of the semifinals. As in recent seasons, the first qualified team plays its quarterfinal game on Thursday.

== Bracket ==
Quarterfinals; 16–17 February
Baskonia | 90
Iberostar Tenerife | 81
Real Madrid | 99
MoraBanc Andorra | 93
FC Barcelona Lassa | 82
Unicaja | 70
Valencia Basket | 88
Herbalife Gran Canaria | 72

Semifinals; 18 February
Baskonia | 99
Real Madrid | 103
FC Barcelona Lassa | 67
Valencia Basket | 76

Final; 19 February
Real Madrid | 97
Valencia Basket | 95

== Quarterfinals ==
=== Baskonia vs. Iberostar Tenerife ===
| 16 February 2017 | Baskonia | 90–81 | Iberostar Tenerife | Vitoria-Gasteiz |
| 19:00 (CET) | Scoring by quarter: 22–15, 23–19, 16–21, 29–26 |
| | Pts: Larkin 26; Rebs: Voigtmann 7 Asts: Larkin 8 PIR: Larkin 34 | Boxscore | Pts: Grigonis 23; Rebs: Abromaitis 10; Asts: Grigonis 6 PIR: Grigonis 28 | Arena: Fernando Buesa Arena; Attendance: 14,625; Referees: Miguel Ángel Pérez Pérez, Benjamín Jiménez, Fernando Calatrava |

| Starters: | | | Pts | Reb | Ast |
|---|---|---|---|---|---|
| PG | 0 | (United States) Shane Larkin | 26 | 3 | 8 |
| SG | 10 | (France) Rodrigue Beaubois | 10 | 5 | 2 |
| SF | 8 | (Hungary) Ádám Hanga | 16 | 4 | 2 |
| PF | 14 | (France) Kim Tillie | 10 | 5 | 1 |
| C | 7 | (Germany) Johannes Voigtmann | 3 | 7 | 3 |
| Reserves: | | | | | |
| PF | 1 | (Italy) Andrea Bargnani | 6 | 2 | 0 |
| SF | 9 | (Lithuania) Tadas Sedekerskis | DNP | | |
| C | 12 | (Spain) Ilimane Diop | 8 | 4 | 0 |
| PG | 15 | (Argentina) Nicolás Laprovíttola | 0 | 2 | 0 |
| PF | 23 | (Georgia (country)) Tornike Shengelia | DNP | | |
| PF | 34 | (United States) Chase Budinger | 10 | 6 | 1 |
| PG | 55 | (Brazil) Rafa Luz | 1 | 0 | 1 |
Head coach:
(Spanish Basketball Federation) Sito Alonso

| Baskonia | Iberostar Tenerife |

| Starters: | | | Pts | Reb | Ast |
|---|---|---|---|---|---|
| PG | 00 | (Spain) Rodrigo San Miguel | 5 | 1 | 2 |
| SG | 13 | (Lithuania) Marius Grigonis | 23 | 1 | 6 |
| SF | 42 | (Canada) Aaron Doornekamp | 7 | 4 | 3 |
| PF | 11 | (United States) Will Hanley | 0 | 1 | 0 |
| C | 31 | (Greece) Georgios Bogris | 18 | 9 | 2 |
| Reserves: | | | | | |
| SG | 5 | (Argentina) Nicolás Richotti | 0 | 0 | 0 |
| C | 7 | (Senegal) Mamadou Niang | DNP | | |
| PG | 10 | (Spain) Ferran Bassas | 0 | 0 | 0 |
| SF | 12 | (France) Tariq Kirksay | 5 | 2 | 0 |
| C | 17 | (Spain) Fran Vázquez | 2 | 2 | 0 |
| PF | 21 | (United States) Tim Abromaitis | 11 | 10 | 0 |
| PG | 34 | (United States) Davin White | 10 | 3 | 3 |
Head coach:
(Spanish Basketball Federation) Txus Vidorreta

=== Real Madrid vs. MoraBanc Andorra ===
| 16 February 2017 | Real Madrid | 99–93(OT) | MoraBanc Andorra | Vitoria-Gasteiz |
| 21:30 (CET) | Scoring by quarter: 15–23, 18–20, 23–16, 30–27, Overtime: 13–7 |
| | Pts: Randolph 25; Rebs: Dončić 10; Asts: Llull 11; PIR: Llull 28 | Boxscore | Pts: Shermadini 27; Rebs: Albicy, Stević 8 Asts: Albicy 4 PIR: Shermadini 28 | Arena: Fernando Buesa Arena; Attendance: 14,597; Referees: Daniel Hierrezuelo, Carlos Peruga, Francisco José Araña |

| Starters: | | | Pts | Reb | Ast |
|---|---|---|---|---|---|
| PG | 23 | (Spain) Sergio Llull | 22 | 7 | 11 |
| SG | 8 | (Lithuania) Jonas Mačiulis | 2 | 4 | 0 |
| SF | 44 | (Sweden) Jeffery Taylor | 2 | 2 | 0 |
| PF | 9 | (Spain) Felipe Reyes | 0 | 3 | 0 |
| C | 14 | (Mexico) Gustavo Ayón | 10 | 4 | 1 |
| Reserves: | | | | | |
| PF | 3 | (United States) Anthony Randolph | 25 | 6 | 0 |
| PG | 4 | (Croatia) Dontaye Draper | 0 | 0 | 0 |
| SG | 5 | (Spain) Rudy Fernández | 7 | 4 | 1 |
| SF | 6 | (Argentina) Andrés Nocioni | 11 | 8 | 2 |
| PG | 7 | (Slovenia) Luka Dončić | 12 | 10 | 7 |
| SG | 20 | (Azerbaijan) Jaycee Carroll | 8 | 1 | 0 |
| C | 21 | (United States) Othello Hunter | 0 | 3 | 0 |
Head coach:
(Spanish Basketball Federation) Pablo Laso

| Real Madrid | MoraBanc Andorra |

| Starters: | | | Pts | Reb | Ast |
|---|---|---|---|---|---|
| PG | 16 | (France) Andrew Albicy | 15 | 8 | 4 |
| SG | 23 | (United States) David Walker | 3 | 3 | 0 |
| SF | 25 | (Czech Republic) David Jelínek | 4 | 2 | 3 |
| PF | 43 | (Greece) Thanasis Antetokounmpo | 9 | 2 | 0 |
| C | 17 | (Georgia (country)) Giorgi Shermadini | 27 | 7 | 0 |
| Reserves: | | | | | |
| PG | 5 | (Austria) Thomas Schreiner | 9 | 1 | 1 |
| PF | 7 | (Georgia (country)) Beka Burjanadze | 7 | 7 | 2 |
| PF | 8 | (Andorra) Hugo Schneider | 0 | 0 | 0 |
| C | 14 | (Serbia) Oliver Stević | 4 | 8 | 1 |
| PG | 15 | (Spain) David Navarro | 13 | 4 | 3 |
| PG | 24 | (Andorra) Guillem Colom | 0 | 0 | 0 |
| SF | 35 | (Spain) Nil Brià | 2 | 0 | 0 |
Head coach:
(Spanish Basketball Federation) Joan Peñarroya

=== Valencia Basket vs. Herbalife Gran Canaria ===
| 17 February 2017 | Valencia Basket | 88–72 | Herbalife Gran Canaria | Vitoria-Gasteiz |
| 19:00 (CET) | Scoring by quarter: 23–17, 26–17, 13–16, 26–22 |
| | Pts: Dubljević 22; Rebs: Dubljević 11; Asts: Van Rossom 7 PIR: Dubljević 32 | Boxscore | Pts: Pasečņiks 12; Rebs: O'Neale 6 Asts: Oliver 7 PIR: Aguilar 13 | Arena: Fernando Buesa Arena; Attendance: 14,352; Referees: José Antonio Martín Bertrán, Antonio Conde, Carlos Cortés |

| Starters: | | | Pts | Reb | Ast |
|---|---|---|---|---|---|
| PG | 16 | (Spain) Guillem Vives | 12 | 2 | 4 |
| SG | 17 | (Spain) Rafa Martínez | 3 | 3 | 2 |
| SF | 19 | (Spain) Fernando San Emeterio | 2 | 2 | 2 |
| PF | 43 | (United States) Luke Sikma | 6 | 6 | 6 |
| C | 14 | (Montenegro) Bojan Dubljević | 22 | 11 | 32 |
| Reserves: | | | | | |
| PF | 0 | (United States) Will Thomas | 2 | 1 | 0 |
| SG | 8 | (France) Antoine Diot | 3 | 2 | 1 |
| PG | 9 | (Belgium) Sam van Rossom | 8 | 1 | 7 |
| PF | 10 | (Central African Republic) Romain Sato | 7 | 2 | 0 |
| PF | 18 | (Spain) Pierre Oriola | 14 | 1 | 0 |
| SF | 30 | (Spain) Joan Sastre | 9 | 0 | 2 |
| C | 55 | (Ukraine) Viacheslav Kravtsov | 0 | 3 | 0 |
Head coach:
(Spanish Basketball Federation) Pedro Martínez

| Valencia Basket | Herbalife Gran Canaria |

| Starters: | | | Pts | Reb | Ast |
|---|---|---|---|---|---|
| PG | 7 | (North Macedonia) Bo McCalebb | 10 | 0 | 2 |
| SG | 9 | (Finland) Sasu Salin | 7 | 2 | 0 |
| SF | 15 | (United States) Royce O'Neale | 4 | 6 | 2 |
| PF | 13 | (Dominican Republic) Eulis Báez | 4 | 2 | 1 |
| C | 14 | (Latvia) Anžejs Pasečņiks | 12 | 2 | 0 |
| Reserves: | | | | | |
| C | 2 | (North Macedonia) Richard Hendrix | 5 | 2 | 1 |
| PG | 4 | (Spain) Albert Oliver | 7 | 1 | 7 |
| C | 6 | (Croatia) Darko Planinić | 4 | 3 | 0 |
| SF | 21 | (Spain) Oriol Paulí | 0 | 1 | 1 |
| SF | 22 | (Spain) Xavi Rabaseda | 3 | 0 | 0 |
| SG | 24 | (United States) Kyle Kuric | 9 | 2 | 2 |
| PF | 34 | (Spain) Pablo Aguilar | 7 | 2 | 3 |
Head coach:
(Spanish Basketball Federation) Luis Casimiro

=== FC Barcelona Lassa vs. Unicaja ===
| 17 February 2017 | FC Barcelona Lassa | 82–70 | Unicaja | Vitoria-Gasteiz |
| 21:30 (CET) | Scoring by quarter: 17–22, 11–11, 30–18, 24–19 |
| | Pts: Rice 20; Rebs: Tomić 6 Asts: Rice 7 PIR: Eriksson 23 | Boxscore | Pts: Nedović 16; Rebs: Suárez 7 Asts: Nedović 3 PIR: Nedović 18 | Arena: Fernando Buesa Arena; Attendance: 14,535; Referees: Juan Carlos García González, Emilio Pérez Pizarro, Sergio Manuel |

| Starters: | | | Pts | Reb | Ast |
|---|---|---|---|---|---|
| PG | 2 | (Montenegro) Tyrese Rice | 20 | 2 | 7 |
| SG | 32 | (United States) Alex Renfroe | 11 | 4 | 3 |
| SF | 33 | (Greece) Stratos Perperoglou | 1 | 4 | 2 |
| PF | 14 | (Bulgaria) Aleksandar Vezenkov | 4 | 1 | 0 |
| C | 44 | (Croatia) Ante Tomić | 13 | 6 | 1 |
| Reserves: | | | | | |
| PG | 1 | (United States) Xavier Munford | 3 | 0 | 0 |
| SF | 10 | (Spain) Víctor Claver | 0 | 5 | 1 |
| PF | 13 | (Brazil) Vítor Faverani | 7 | 5 | 0 |
| PG | 16 | (Serbia) Stefan Peno | DNP | | |
| SG | 20 | (Sweden) Marcus Eriksson | 18 | 4 | 0 |
| C | 21 | (Senegal) Moussa Diagne | 0 | 1 | 0 |
| SG | 25 | (Finland) Petteri Koponen | 5 | 0 | 2 |
Head coach:
(Hellenic Basketball Federation) Georgios Bartzokas

| FC Barcelona Lassa | Unicaja |

| Starters: | | | Pts | Reb | Ast |
|---|---|---|---|---|---|
| PG | 8 | (United States) Kyle Fogg | 8 | 2 | 0 |
| SG | 16 | (Serbia) Nemanja Nedović | 16 | 2 | 3 |
| SF | 21 | (Poland) Adam Waczyński | 3 | 2 | 0 |
| PF | 23 | (United States) Jeff Brooks | 12 | 5 | 1 |
| C | 44 | (Serbia) Dejan Musli | 6 | 6 | 0 |
| Reserves: | | | | | |
| C | 2 | (Democratic Republic of the Congo) Viny Okouo | 0 | 0 | 0 |
| PG | 9 | (Spain) Alberto Díaz | 7 | 2 | 2 |
| SF | 11 | (Spain) Dani Díez | 0 | 0 | 0 |
| SG | 15 | (United States) Jamar Smith | 10 | 0 | 1 |
| PG | 20 | (Croatia) Oliver Lafayette | DNP | | |
| SF | 43 | (Spain) Carlos Suárez | 6 | 7 | 2 |
| C | 92 | (Slovenia) Alen Omić | 2 | 1 | 0 |
Head coach:
(Spanish Basketball Federation) Joan Plaza

== Semifinals ==
=== Baskonia vs. Real Madrid ===
| 18 February 2017 | Baskonia | 99–103(OT) | Real Madrid | Vitoria-Gasteiz |
| 18:30 (CET) | Scoring by quarter: 20–15, 15–29, 29–24, 25–21, Overtime: 10–14 |
| | Pts: Beaubois 27; Rebs: Voigtmann 11; Asts: Larkin 9 PIR: Beaubois 25 | Boxscore | Pts: Dončić, Llull 23; Rebs: Dončić 6 Asts: Ayón 8 PIR: Dončić 26 | Arena: Fernando Buesa Arena; Attendance: 15,465; Referees: José Antonio Martín Bertrán, Miguel Ángel Pérez Pérez, Benjamín Jiménez |

| Starters: | | | Pts | Reb | Ast |
|---|---|---|---|---|---|
| PG | 0 | (United States) Shane Larkin | 17 | 1 | 9 |
| SG | 10 | (France) Rodrigue Beaubois | 27 | 1 | 2 |
| SF | 8 | (Hungary) Ádám Hanga | 19 | 4 | 2 |
| PF | 7 | (Germany) Johannes Voigtmann | 10 | 11 | 6 |
| C | 12 | (Spain) Ilimane Diop | 2 | 5 | 0 |
| Reserves: | | | | | |
| PF | 1 | (Italy) Andrea Bargnani | 8 | 1 | 0 |
| SF | 9 | (Lithuania) Tadas Sedekerskis | DNP | | |
| PF | 14 | (France) Kim Tillie | 8 | 2 | 2 |
| PG | 15 | (Argentina) Nicolás Laprovíttola | 0 | 1 | 2 |
| PF | 23 | (Georgia (country)) Tornike Shengelia | DNP | | |
| PF | 34 | (United States) Chase Budinger | 8 | 7 | 2 |
| PG | 55 | (Brazil) Rafa Luz | 0 | 0 | 0 |
Head coach:
(Spanish Basketball Federation) Sito Alonso

| Baskonia | Real Madrid |

| Starters: | | | Pts | Reb | Ast |
|---|---|---|---|---|---|
| PG | 23 | (Spain) Sergio Llull | 23 | 1 | 4 |
| SG | 20 | (Azerbaijan) Jaycee Carroll | 3 | 2 | 0 |
| SF | 8 | (Lithuania) Jonas Mačiulis | 2 | 0 | 1 |
| PF | 9 | (Spain) Felipe Reyes | 6 | 4 | 0 |
| C | 14 | (Mexico) Gustavo Ayón | 13 | 5 | 8 |
| Reserves: | | | | | |
| PF | 3 | (United States) Anthony Randolph | 20 | 4 | 1 |
| PG | 4 | (Croatia) Dontaye Draper | DNP | | |
| SG | 5 | (Spain) Rudy Fernández | 3 | 5 | 5 |
| SF | 6 | (Argentina) Andrés Nocioni | 3 | 0 | 0 |
| PG | 7 | (Slovenia) Luka Dončić | 23 | 6 | 3 |
| C | 21 | (United States) Othello Hunter | 4 | 2 | 0 |
| SF | 44 | (Sweden) Jeffery Taylor | 3 | 5 | 2 |
Head coach:
(Spanish Basketball Federation) Pablo Laso

=== FC Barcelona Lassa vs. Valencia Basket ===
| 18 February 2017 | FC Barcelona Lassa | 67–76 | Valencia Basket | Vitoria-Gasteiz |
| 21:00 (CET) | Scoring by quarter: 17–19, 21–10, 13–30, 16–17 |
| | Pts: Tomić 17; Rebs: Tomić 15; Asts: Renfroe 6 PIR: Tomić 33 | Boxscore | Pts: San Emeterio 16; Rebs: Sikma 8 Asts: Van Rossom 6 PIR: San Emeterio 18 | Arena: Fernando Buesa Arena; Attendance: 15,412; Referees: Juan Carlos García González, Emilio Pérez Pizarro, Carlos Cortés |

| Starters: | | | Pts | Reb | Ast |
|---|---|---|---|---|---|
| PG | 2 | (Montenegro) Tyrese Rice | 3 | 1 | 3 |
| SG | 32 | (United States) Alex Renfroe | 3 | 0 | 6 |
| SF | 20 | (Sweden) Marcus Eriksson | 3 | 3 | 1 |
| PF | 14 | (Bulgaria) Aleksandar Vezenkov | 11 | 1 | 0 |
| C | 21 | (Senegal) Moussa Diagne | 0 | 0 | 0 |
| Reserves: | | | | | |
| PG | 1 | (United States) Xavier Munford | 7 | 4 | 0 |
| SF | 10 | (Spain) Víctor Claver | 5 | 1 | 0 |
| PF | 13 | (Brazil) Vítor Faverani | 0 | 2 | 0 |
| PG | 16 | (Serbia) Stefan Peno | 2 | 3 | 1 |
| SG | 24 | (United States) Brad Oleson | DNP | | |
| SG | 25 | (Finland) Petteri Koponen | 16 | 2 | 4 |
| C | 44 | (Croatia) Ante Tomić | 17 | 15 | 3 |
Head coach:
(Hellenic Basketball Federation) Georgios Bartzokas

| FC Barcelona Lassa | Valencia Basket |

| Starters: | | | Pts | Reb | Ast |
|---|---|---|---|---|---|
| PG | 8 | (France) Antoine Diot | 2 | 4 | 4 |
| SG | 17 | (Spain) Rafa Martínez | 10 | 3 | 0 |
| SF | 19 | (Spain) Fernando San Emeterio | 16 | 4 | 0 |
| PF | 43 | (United States) Luke Sikma | 2 | 8 | 0 |
| C | 14 | (Montenegro) Bojan Dubljević | 13 | 3 | 1 |
| Reserves: | | | | | |
| PF | 0 | (United States) Will Thomas | 2 | 3 | 0 |
| PG | 9 | (Belgium) Sam van Rossom | 7 | 4 | 6 |
| PF | 10 | (Central African Republic) Romain Sato | 0 | 1 | 0 |
| PG | 16 | (Spain) Guillem Vives | 3 | 0 | 3 |
| PF | 18 | (Spain) Pierre Oriola | 11 | 2 | 0 |
| SF | 30 | (Spain) Joan Sastre | 3 | 2 | 0 |
| C | 55 | (Ukraine) Viacheslav Kravtsov | 7 | 1 | 0 |
Head coach:
(Spanish Basketball Federation) Pedro Martínez

== Final ==
| 19 February 2017 | Real Madrid | 97–95 | Valencia Basket | Vitoria-Gasteiz |
| 18:30 (CET) | Scoring by quarter: 22–16, 25–29, 27–26, 23–24 |
| | Pts: Llull 22; Rebs: Randolph 7 Asts: Dončić 6 PIR: Randolph 26 | Boxscore | Pts: Dubljević 28; Rebs: Oriola 8 Asts: Van Rossom 7 PIR: Dubljević 31 | Arena: Fernando Buesa Arena; Attendance: 14,982; Referees: Juan Carlos García González, Antonio Conde, Benjamín Jiménez |

| Starters: | | | Pts | Reb | Ast |
|---|---|---|---|---|---|
| PG | 23 | (Spain) Sergio Llull | 22 | 0 | 4 |
| SG | 5 | (Spain) Rudy Fernández | 2 | 1 | 2 |
| SF | 44 | (Sweden) Jeffery Taylor | 5 | 1 | 1 |
| PF | 3 | (United States) Anthony Randolph | 20 | 7 | 1 |
| C | 9 | (Spain) Felipe Reyes | 1 | 0 | 1 |
| Reserves: | | | | | |
| PG | 4 | (Croatia) Dontaye Draper | 0 | 1 | 1 |
| SF | 6 | (Argentina) Andrés Nocioni | 0 | 3 | 2 |
| PG | 7 | (Slovenia) Luka Dončić | 9 | 4 | 6 |
| SG | 8 | (Lithuania) Jonas Mačiulis | 3 | 0 | 1 |
| C | 14 | (Mexico) Gustavo Ayón | 18 | 2 | 1 |
| SG | 20 | (Azerbaijan) Jaycee Carroll | 14 | 0 | 0 |
| C | 21 | (United States) Othello Hunter | 3 | 2 | 0 |
Head coach:
(Spanish Basketball Federation) Pablo Laso

| Real Madrid | Valencia Basket |

Copa del Rey MVP
(Spain) Sergio Llull
Game rules
Game was played under FIBA rules.

2017 Copa del Rey winners
Real Madrid
27th title

| Starters: | | | Pts | Reb | Ast |
|---|---|---|---|---|---|
| PG | 9 | (Belgium) Sam van Rossom | 6 | 1 | 7 |
| SG | 17 | (Spain) Rafa Martínez | 7 | 2 | 1 |
| SF | 19 | (Spain) Fernando San Emeterio | 17 | 3 | 1 |
| PF | 43 | (United States) Luke Sikma | 6 | 4 | 3 |
| C | 14 | (Montenegro) Bojan Dubljević | 28 | 5 | 1 |
| Reserves: | | | | | |
| PF | 0 | (United States) Will Thomas | 4 | 6 | 0 |
| PG | 8 | (France) Antoine Diot | 2 | 0 | 2 |
| PF | 10 | (Central African Republic) Romain Sato | 5 | 5 | 0 |
| PG | 16 | (Spain) Guillem Vives | 2 | 1 | 2 |
| PF | 18 | (Spain) Pierre Oriola | 6 | 8 | 1 |
| SF | 30 | (Spain) Joan Sastre | 12 | 2 | 1 |
| C | 55 | (Ukraine) Viacheslav Kravtsov | 0 | 0 | 0 |
Head coach:
(Spanish Basketball Federation) Pedro Martínez
