= Felipe Reyes =

Spanish basketball player (born 1980)

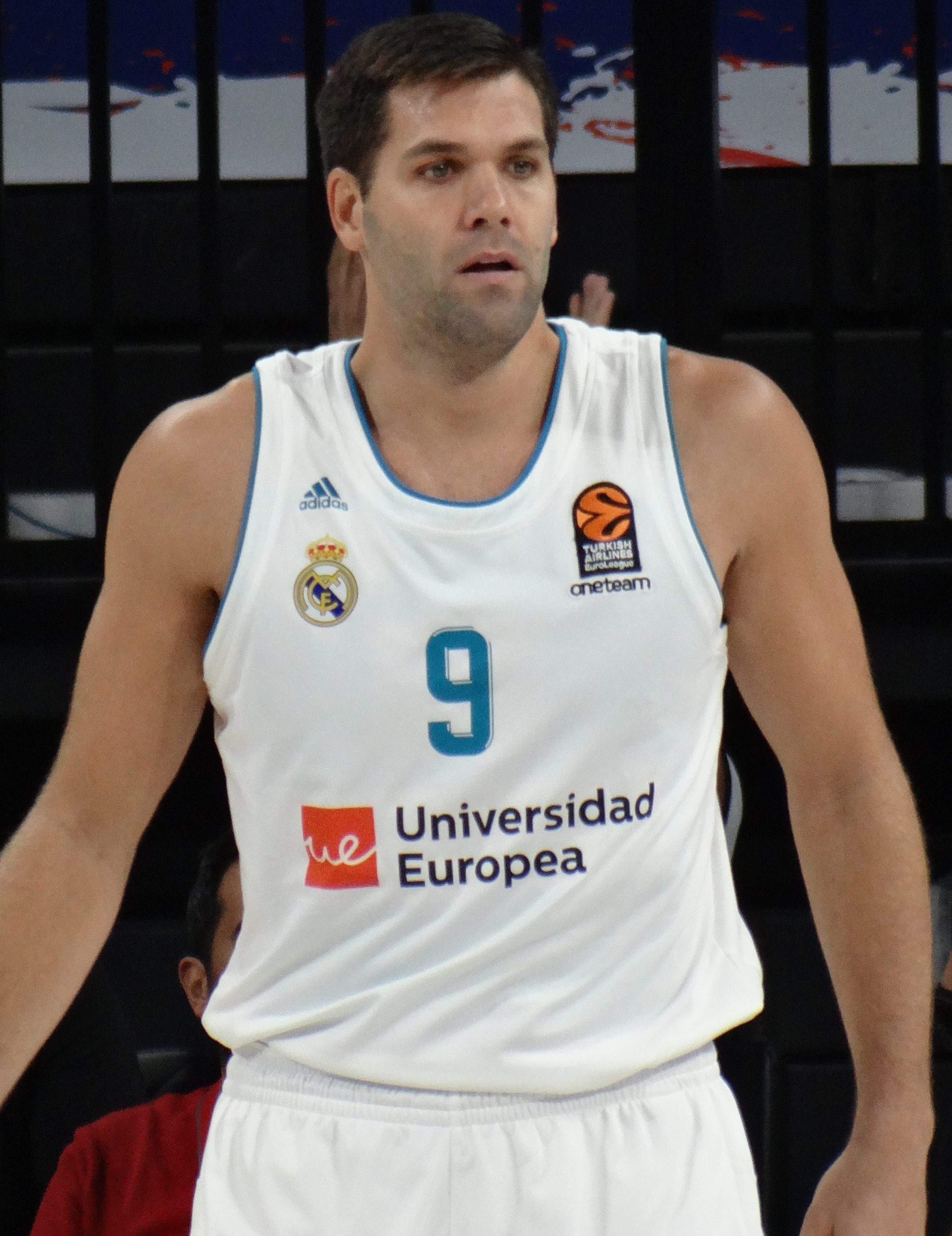
- Reyes with Real Madrid in 2017

Personal information
- Born: 16 March 1980 (age 46) Córdoba, Spain
- Listed height: 6 ft 9 in (2.06 m)
- Listed weight: 265 lb (120 kg)

Career information
- NBA draft: 2002: undrafted
- Playing career: 1998–2021
- Position: Power forward / center
- Number: 9

Career history
- 1998–2004: Estudiantes
- 2004–2021: Real Madrid

Career highlights
- 2× EuroLeague champion (2015, 2018); All-EuroLeague First Team (2015); EuroLeague Legend (2022); FIBA EuroStar (2007); EuroCup champion (2007); FIBA Intercontinental Cup champion (2015); 7× Liga ACB champion (2005, 2007, 2013, 2015, 2016, 2018, 2019); 7× Spanish Cup winner (2000, 2012, 2014–2017, 2020); 6× Spanish Supercup winner (2012–2014), (2018, 2019, 2020); 2× Liga ACB MVP (2009, 2015); 2× Liga ACB Finals MVP (2007, 2013); 4× All-Liga ACB Team (2007–2009, 2015); 2× Liga ACB All-Star (2001 I, 2003); Spanish League all-time leader in games played; Liga ACB all-time leader in total rebounds
Medals
Men's basketball
Representing Spain
Olympic Games
Silver medal – second place	2008 Beijing	Team
Silver medal – second place	2012 London	Team
Bronze medal – third place	2016 Rio de Janeiro	Team
FIBA World Cup
Gold medal – first place	2006 Japan
EuroBasket
Gold medal – first place	2009 Poland
Gold medal – first place	2011 Lithuania
Gold medal – first place	2015 France–Croatia–Germany–Latvia
Silver medal – second place	2003 Sweden
Silver medal – second place	2007 Spain
Bronze medal – third place	2001 Turkey
FIBA U19 World Cup
Gold medal – first place	1999 Portugal	U19 Team
FIBA Europe U20 Championship
Bronze medal – third place	2000 Macedonia	U20 Team
FIBA Europe U18 Championship
Gold medal – first place	1998 Bulgaria	U18 Team

Felipe Reyes Cabanás (born 16 March 1980) is a Spanish former professional basketball player. He represented the senior Spain national team. Standing at a height of 2.06 m (6 ft 9 in), and weighing 120 kg (260 lb), he played at the power forward and center positions.

During his pro club career, Reyes won two EuroLeague championships, in 2015 and 2018. He was also an All-EuroLeague First Team selection in the EuroLeague 2014–15 season. He was named a EuroLeague Legend in 2022. With Spain's senior national team, he won the gold medal at the 2006 FIBA World Cup, and gold medals at the 2009 EuroBasket, the 2011 EuroBasket, and the 2015 EuroBasket.

== Professional career ==
=== Estudiantes Madrid (1998–2004) ===
Reyes began his professional club career in the Spanish top-tier level ACB League, with Estudiantes Madrid, during the Spanish League 1998–99 season. In that same season, he also played with the club's second level reserve team, Estudiantes B, in the Spanish 2nd-tier level EBA League. He played with Estudiantes through the Spanish League 2003–04 season. With Estudiantes, he also played in the European-wide secondary level EuroCup, and the European-wide premier level EuroLeague.

=== Real Madrid (2004–2021) ===
Reyes moved to the Spanish EuroLeague club Real Madrid, before the 2004–05 season. In May 2015, he was named to the 2014–15 season's All-EuroLeague First Team, for his performance during the season; and he was also named the Spanish ACB League Most Valuable Player of the 2014–15 ACB season, marking the second time in his career that he won that award.

During that 2014–15 season, Reyes' club, Real Madrid, won the EuroLeague season's championship, after defeating Olympiacos, by a score of 78–59, in the league's final game. Real Madrid eventually finished the season, by also winning the Spanish ACB League season championship, after a 3–0 series sweep in the Spanish League final series against Barcelona. With that title, Real Madrid had won the Triple Crown for the season.

On 27 June 2015, Reyes signed a two-year contract extension with Real Madrid. He became the Spanish ACB League's all-time career leader in total rebounds, in March 2017, after surpassing the previous record holder, Granger Hall.

In May 2018, Real Madrid won the 2017–18 EuroLeague season's championship, after defeating Fenerbahçe Doğuş in the final game, by a score of 85–80. Over 35 EuroLeague games played that season, Reyes averaged 8.4 points and 4.3 rebounds per game.

On 4 February 2019, Reyes became the ACB League's all-time leader in games played, including both formats of the league (ACB & Primera División). He achieved that after he played in his 779th Spanish League game, against Unicaja Málaga, eclipsing the league's previous record-holder for most games played, Joan Creus's tally. On 15 February 2019, Reyes became the all-time leader in games played in the Spanish King's Cup tournament, as he overtook Juan Carlos Navarro, to achieve that record.

On 24 July 2020 Reyes re-signed with the team.

On 23 June 2021 Reyes announced the end of his professional basketball career in which he was the captain of the team.

== National team career ==
Reyes was a member of the junior national teams of Spain. With Spain's junior national teams, he won medals at the following tournaments: the gold medal at the 1998 FIBA Europe Under-18 Championship, the gold medal at the 1999 FIBA Under-19 World Cup, and the bronze medal at the 2000 FIBA Europe Under-20 Championship.

Reyes was a long-time member of the senior Spain men's national basketball team. With Spain's senior national team, he won the following medals: the bronze medal at the 2001 EuroBasket, the silver medal at the 2003 EuroBasket, the gold medal at the 2006 FIBA World Cup, the silver medal at the 2007 EuroBasket, the silver medal at the 2008 Summer Olympics, the gold medal at the 2009 EuroBasket, the gold medal at the 2011 EuroBasket, the silver medal at the 2012 Summer Olympics, the gold medal at the 2015 EuroBasket, and the bronze medal at the 2016 Summer Olympics. With Spain, he also played at the 2002 FIBA World Cup, the 2004 Summer Olympics, the 2005 EuroBasket, the 2010 FIBA World Cup, and the 2014 FIBA World Cup.

== Personal life ==
Reyes' older brother, Alfonso, is also a former professional basketball player. Reyes' nickname is "Espartaco" (English: "Spartacus").

== Career statistics ==
Legend
GP	Games played	GS	Games started	MPG	Minutes per game
FG%	Field-goal percentage	3P%	3-point field-goal percentage	FT%	Free-throw percentage
RPG	Rebounds per game	APG	Assists per game	SPG	Steals per game
BPG	Blocks per game	PPG	Points per game	PIR	Performance index rating
**Bold**	Career high

=== EuroLeague ===
†	Denotes seasons in which Reyes won the EuroLeague
*	Led the league

Year	Team	GP	GS	MPG	FG%	3P%	FT%	RPG	APG	SPG	BPG	PPG	PIR
2000–01	Estudiantes	12	7	15.8	.547	—	.638	4.1	.6	.8	.3	7.9	8.4
2004–05	Real Madrid	17	14	22.8	.398	—	.560	**7.7**	1.2	**1.6**	.4	6.8	10.9
2005–06	Real Madrid	22	**22**	**26.5**	.507	—	.606	7.5	**1.4**	1.1	.3	9.8	13.5
2007–08	Real Madrid	19	10	24.4	.500	—	.604	7.1	.9	1.3	**.5**	12.6	**15.8**
2008–09	Real Madrid	19	10	24.4	.500	**.500**	.800	6.5	1.1	1.3	.1	**13.6**	**15.8**
2009–10	Real Madrid	14	2	17.8	.432	—	.780	5.0	.9	.8	.1	7.3	9.1
2010–11	Real Madrid	21	21	19.1	.422	.200	.838	5.5	.9	.4	.2	8.7	9.8
2011–12	Real Madrid	16	0	18.5	.468	—	.793	6.3	.6	.6	.2	8.4	11.3
2012–13	Real Madrid	29	0	18.1	.456	.294	.706	5.1	.5	.5	.3	7.6	8.9
2013–14	Real Madrid	30	0	16.5	.462	.304	.855	4.8	.7	.3	.2	9.1	10.3
2014–15†	Real Madrid	30*	20	19.1	.502	.294	.814	5.1	1.0	.5	.3	10.7	13.3
2015–16	Real Madrid	26	20	18.9	.509	.414	.829	5.9	.9	.5	.2	10.8	13.9
2016–17	Real Madrid	30	18	12.4	.477	.333	.818	2.8	.7	.3	.3	5.3	6.9
2017–18†	Real Madrid	**35**	7	15.5	.582	.429	.793	4.3	.8	.2	.2	8.4	10.9
2018–19	Real Madrid	23	1	8.9	**.593**	—	**.935**	2.1	.3	.3	.0	4.0	5.0
2019–20	Real Madrid	7	0	8.0	.429	.200	.833	1.6	.4	.3	.1	3.4	2.4
2020–21	Real Madrid	5	0	4.3	.250	—	.750	1.2	.2	.2	.2	1.4	0.8
Career		357	157	17.8	.488	.320	.749	5.0	.8	.6	.2	8.5	10.6

== Awards and accomplishments ==
=== Pro career ===
- 7× Spanish Cup winner: (2000, 2012, 2014–2017, 2020)
- 7× Spanish League champion: (2005, 2007, 2013, 2015, 2016, 2018, 2019)
- EuroCup champion: (2007)
- 4× All-Spanish League Team: (2007–2009, 2015)
- 2× Spanish League Finals MVP: (2007, 2013)
- 2× Spanish League MVP: (2009, 2015)
- 6× Spanish Supercup winner: (2012–2014), (2018, 2019, 2020)
- All-EuroLeague First Team: (2015)
- 2× EuroLeague champion: (2015, 2018)
- FIBA Intercontinental Cup champion: (2015)
- Spanish League all-time leader in games played
- Spanish League all-time leader in total rebounds

=== Spanish junior national team ===
- FIBA U18 European Championship: Gold
- FIBA Under-19 Basketball World Cup: Gold
- FIBA U20 European Championship: Bronze

=== Spanish senior national team ===
- EuroBasket 2001: Bronze
- EuroBasket 2003: Silver
- 2006 FIBA World Championship: Gold
- FIBA EuroStar: (2007)
- EuroBasket 2007: Silver
- 2008 Summer Olympic Games: (silver)
- EuroBasket 2009: Gold
- EuroBasket 2011: Gold
- 2012 Summer Olympic Games: (silver)
- EuroBasket 2015: Gold
- 2016 Summer Olympic Games: (bronze)
