= Sergio Llull =

Spanish basketball player (born 1987)

- Llull with Real Madrid in 2026

No. 23 – Real Madrid
- Position: Shooting guard / point guard
- League: Liga ACB; EuroLeague

Personal information
- Born: 15 November 1987 (age 38) Mahón, Menorca, Spain
- Listed height: 1.94 m (6 ft 4 in)
- Listed weight: 207 lb (94 kg)

Career information
- NBA draft: 2009: 2nd round, 34th overall pick
- Drafted by: Denver Nuggets
- Playing career: 2005–present

Career history
- 2005–2007: Manresa
- 2005–2006: →Finques Olesa
- 2007–present: Real Madrid

Career highlights
- 3× EuroLeague champion (2015, 2018, 2023); EuroLeague MVP (2017); EuroLeague 25th Anniversary Team (2025); EuroLeague Basketball 2010–20 All-Decade Team; All-EuroLeague First Team (2017); All-EuroLeague Second Team (2011); EuroLeague SuperCup champion (2026); 9× Liga ACB champion (2007, 2013, 2015, 2016, 2018, 2019, 2022, 2024, 2025); 7× Copa del Rey (2012, 2014–2017, 2020, 2024); Liga ACB MVP (2017); 2× Liga ACB Finals MVP (2015, 2016); 3× Liga ACB Domestic Player of the Year (2016, 2017, 2019); 3× All-Liga ACB First Team (2012, 2015, 2017); 2× Copa del Rey MVP (2012, 2017); 9× Spanish Supercup (2012–2014, 2018–2023); 3× Spanish Supercup MVP (2014, 2018, 2021); FIBA Intercontinental Cup champion (2015); FIBA Intercontinental Cup MVP (2015); EuroLeague career stats leaders: EuroLeague all-time leader in games played; EuroLeague all-time leader in three-pointers made
- Stats at Basketball Reference
Medals
Men's basketball
Representing Spain
Olympic Games
| Silver medal – second place | 2012 London | Team |
| Bronze medal – third place | 2016 Rio de Janeiro | Team |
World Cup
| Gold medal – first place | 2019 China |
EuroBasket
| Gold medal – first place | 2009 Poland |
| Gold medal – first place | 2011 Lithuania |
| Gold medal – first place | 2015 France–Croatia–Germany–Latvia |
| Bronze medal – third place | 2013 Slovenia |
FIBA Europe U20 Championship
| Silver medal – second place | 2007 Slovenia & Italy | U20 Team |
FIBA Europe U18 Championship
| Gold medal – first place | 2004 Spain | U18 Team |

Sergio Llull Melià (Spanish pronunciation: [ˈseɾxjo ˈʎuʎ]; born 15 November 1987) is a Spanish professional basketball player and the team captain for Real Madrid of the Liga ACB and the EuroLeague. He is a 6 ft 3 in (1.91 m) combo guard. Llull was selected by the Denver Nuggets in the second round of the 2009 NBA draft with the 34th overall pick, but his draft rights were traded to the New York Knicks.

Llull is Real Madrid's all-time leader in points scored. He is also a two−time All-EuroLeague Team selection, and was the EuroLeague MVP of the 2016–17 season. As a regular member of the senior Spain national team, he has won a FIBA World Cup title, three EuroBasket gold medals, as well as a bronze. He also won two Summer Olympics medals, a silver in 2012, and a bronze in 2016.

== Professional career ==
=== Early years ===
Llull began his career playing for the La Salle Maò and CB i Unió Manresana junior clubs as a youth. He made his professional debut with the Spanish ACB League club Manresa during the 2005–06 season. He also played with the Spanish 4th Division club Finques Olesa that season, on loan. He returned to Manresa, and played in the Spanish 2nd Division in the next season.

=== Real Madrid ===
Llull joined the Spanish EuroLeague club Real Madrid in 2007. In 2009, Real Madrid exercised a club option to extend his contract for another 2 years. In 2010, Llull extended his contract with Real Madrid through the year 2014.

He was named the MVP of the final of the mid-season three game 2012 Spanish King's Cup tournament. Later that year, Llull extended his contract with Real Madrid once again, this time through the 2017–18 season.

In the 2014–15 season, Real Madrid won the EuroLeague championship, after defeating Olympiacos by a score of 78–59 in the 2015 EuroLeague Final. Real Madrid eventually finished the season by also winning the Spanish League championship, after a 3–0 series sweep in the Spanish League Finals series against Barcelona. By winning the Spanish League championship, Real Madrid won the triple crown. Llull was named the Spanish League Finals MVP of 2015.

In the Summer of 2015, Llull once again extended his contract with Real Madrid, this time through the 2020–21 season. The 6-year contract extension was at a per season salary of €2.7 million net income per season, and his contract included a record buyout option of €25 million (US$28.64 million as of 3 February 2019 exchange rate), the highest buyout amount ever in European club basketball history.

Llull was named the EuroLeague MVP of the 2016–17 season. In May 2018, Real Madrid won the 2017–18 EuroLeague season championship, after defeating Fenerbahçe Doğuş in the final game, by a score of 85–80. Llull missed most of the season due to a torn ACL injury, only to come back into the team's rotation at the Final Four, where he helped his team to grab their second EuroLeague title in four seasons.

In the 2022–23 season, Llull was crucial in Real Madrid's road to their eleventh EuroLeague title. In the championship game on 21 May, against Olympiacos, he scored a high-arching jump shot with 3.1 second left to give Madrid the final advantage in their 79–78 win. Llull won his third EuroLeague title.

In the 2025–26 season, Llull helped Real Madrid make it to another final of the EuroLeague. In the championship game on 24 May, against Olympiacos, he scored 3 points as Olympiacos defeated Real Madrid 92-85. Llull suffered his fifth EuroLeague final defeat.

In 2026, Llull extended his contract for another season, until 2027. Llull became the first EuroLeague player to play at 20 seasons.

=== NBA draft rights ===
Llull was chosen by the Denver Nuggets with the 34th pick in the 2009 NBA draft. The Houston Rockets then bought his draft rights from the Nuggets for approximately $2.25 million, which at the time made him the most expensive player ever to be purchased during the draft's second round. On 27 November 2020, Llull's draft rights were traded to the New York Knicks.

== National team career ==
As a member of the junior Spain national basketball teams, Llull won the gold medal at the 2004 FIBA Europe Under-18 Championship, and he won the silver medal at the 2007 FIBA Europe Under-20 Championship. He has also played with the senior men's Spain national basketball team.

Llull won the gold medal at the 2019 FIBA World Cup, three gold medals at the EuroBasket, in 2009, 2011, and 2015. He also won the silver medal at the 2012 Summer Olympics, the bronze medal at the EuroBasket 2013, and the bronze medal at the 2016 Summer Olympics. He also played at the 2010 FIBA World Championship, and at the 2014 FIBA World Cup.

Llull competed at the 2020 Summer Olympics and the 2024 Summer Olympics.

== Player profile ==
Early in his career, Llull was known for his straight line speed, jumping ability, and open court fast break dunks. Later in his career, he has been known for his long-distance 3 point shooting, and clutch shots. Llull averaged a PIR of 16.8 in the EuroLeague, during the 2016–17 season.

He can play at either the point guard or shooting guard position. He spent the early part of his club EuroLeague career playing as a shooting guard, and then switched to the point guard position later in his club career. In the senior men's Spain national team, he has mainly played at the shooting guard position.

== Career statistics ==
Legend
| GP | Games played | GS | Games started | MPG | Minutes per game |
| FG% | Field-goal percentage | 3P% | 3-point field-goal percentage | FT% | Free-throw percentage |
| RPG | Rebounds per game | APG | Assists per game | SPG | Steals per game |
| BPG | Blocks per game | PPG | Points per game | PIR | Performance index rating |
| **Bold** | Career high | † | Won a EuroLeague championship | * | Led the league | ‡ | EuroLeague record |

=== EuroLeague ===
| Year | Team | GP | GS | MPG | FG% | 3P% | FT% | RPG | APG | SPG | BPG | PPG | PIR |
|---|---|---|---|---|---|---|---|---|---|---|---|---|---|
| 2007–08 | Real Madrid | 15 | 2 | 8.1 | .370 | .000 | .789 | .4 | .9 | .2 | .1 | 2.3 | 1.7 |
| 2008–09 | Real Madrid | 19 | 4 | 19.0 | .468 | .380 | .926 | 1.1 | 2.2 | .5 | **.2** | 6.9 | 6.6 |
| 2009–10 | Real Madrid | 18 | 1 | 21.1 | **.521** | **.418** | .724 | 1.2 | 2.0 | **1.0** | .1 | 9.5 | 9.4 |
| 2010–11 | Real Madrid | 23* | 22* | 28.0 | .406 | .343 | .841 | **2.3** | 3.0 | .8 | .1 | 11.9 | 10.8 |
| 2011–12 | Real Madrid | 16 | 11 | 22.2 | .427 | .295 | .719 | 1.5 | 3.2 | .6 | — | 7.4 | 7.0 |
| 2012–13 | Real Madrid | 27 | 25 | 27.0 | .400 | .339 | .781 | **2.3** | 3.2 | .6 | .1 | 10.4 | 9.2 |
| 2013–14 | Real Madrid | 31* | 31* | **29.1** | .466 | .338 | .796 | 1.8 | 4.1 | .6 | .0 | 11.4 | 12.0 |
| 2014–15† | Real Madrid | 30* | 30* | 27.5 | .439 | .379 | .821 | 1.7 | 5.8 | .8 | .1 | 10.4 | 13.9 |
| 2015–16 | Real Madrid | 24 | 23 | 27.8 | .378 | .350 | .807 | 1.8 | 4.6 | .7 | **.2** | 12.8 | 12.5 |
| 2016–17 | Real Madrid | 33 | **33** | 27.8 | .416 | .330 | .847 | 1.8 | **5.9** | .7 | .1 | **16.5** | **16.8** |
| 2017–18† | Real Madrid | 4 | 0 | 18.0 | .361 | .375 | .500 | .5 | 4.5 | .5 | — | 10.0 | 6.5 |
| 2018–19 | Real Madrid | 27 | 22 | 21.4 | .358 | .321 | **.958** | 2.0 | 4.0 | .4 | — | 10.5 | 9.3 |
| 2019–20 | Real Madrid | 16 | 2 | 18.6 | .287 | .288 | .893 | 1.2 | 3.5 | .6 | .1 | 7.5 | 4.9 |
| 2020–21 | Real Madrid | 26 | 3 | 17.7 | .365 | .330 | .863 | 1.5 | 3.0 | .4 | — | 8.7 | 7.8 |
| 2021–22 | Real Madrid | 36 | 2 | 19.8 | .329 | .306 | .701 | 1.7 | 2.8 | .5 | — | 8.8 | 6.4 |
| 2022–23† | Real Madrid | 29 | 3 | 16.8 | .306 | .294 | .913 | 1.2 | 2.4 | .3 | — | 6.1 | 5.1 |
| 2023–24 | Real Madrid | 33 | 2 | 18.1 | .371 | .340 | .727 | 1.2 | 2.0 | .3 | .0 | 7.9 | 5.2 |
| 2024–25 | Real Madrid | **40** | 3 | 17.1 | .326 | .292 | .813 | 1.4 | 2.2 | .4 | — | 6.6 | 5.1 |
| 2025–26 | Real Madrid | **40** | 0 | 10.7 | .295 | .268 | .667 | .8 | 1.5 | .2 | — | 3.1 | 1.9 |
| Career | | 487‡ | 219 | 21.0 | .384 | .328 | .812 | 1.5 | 3.2 | .5 | .0 | 8.9 | 8.1 |

== Awards and accomplishments ==
=== Pro career ===
- Liga ACB (Spanish League) champion (8×):

2007, 2013, 2015, 2016, 2018, 2019, 2022, 2024

- Copa del Rey (Spanish Cup) winner (7×):

2012, 2014, 2015, 2016, 2017, 2020, 2024

- Supercopa de España (Spanish Supercup) winner (9×):

2012, 2013, 2014, 2018, 2019, 2020, 2021, 2022, 2023

- EuroLeague champion (3×):

2015, 2018, 2023

- Triple Crown winner:

2015

- FIBA Intercontinental Cup champion:

2015

=== Spanish junior national team ===
- 2004 FIBA Europe Under-18 Championship: Gold
- 2007 FIBA Europe Under-20 Championship: Silver

=== Spanish senior national team ===
- EuroBasket 2009: Gold
- EuroBasket 2011: Gold
- 2012 Summer Olympics: Silver
- EuroBasket 2013: Bronze
- EuroBasket 2015: Gold
- 2016 Summer Olympics: Bronze
- 2019 FIBA World Championship: Gold

=== Individual awards ===
- 2× All-EuroLeague Team:
  - All-EuroLeague Second Team: 2011
  - All-EuroLeague First Team: 2017
- 1× All-Decade Euroleague team member
- 2× Spanish ACB League MVP of the Month: February 2012, February 2016
- 2× Spanish King's Cup MVP: 2012, 2017
- 3× All-Spanish ACB League Team: 2012, 2015, 2017
- 2× EuroLeague MVP of the Month: April 2013, November 2016
- 3× Spanish Supercup MVP: 2014, 2018, 2021
- 2× Spanish ACB League Finals MVP: 2015, 2016
- FIBA Intercontinental Cup MVP: 2015
- Spanish League MVP: 2017
- EuroLeague MVP: 2017
- EuroLeague all-time leader in three-pointers made
