= 1995 Copa del Rey de Baloncesto =

The 1995 Copa del Rey was the 59th edition of the Spanish basketball Cup. It was organized by the ACB and was played in Granada in the Palacio de Deportes between March 3 and 5, 1995. Taugrés Baskonia won its first title after defeating Amway Zaragoza in the final game.

== Competition format ==
The top four teams in the 1993–94 ACB season (FC Barcelona Banca Catalana, Real Madrid, 7Up Joventut and Estudiantes Caja Postal) joined directly the Final Eight stage, which would be played during the 1994–95 ACB season.

The other four places would be decided in a tournament called League of the Cup that was played in April and May 1994, with the eliminated teams in the play-offs of the 1993–94 season. Eliminated teams in the round of 16 would be divided into two groups of four teams. The two first qualified teams would play a playoff qualifier with each one of the four quarterfinalists to get a spot in the Final Eight.

As OAR Ferrol was dissolved before the 1994–95 season, its spot would be decided in a best-of-three playoff between Cáceres and Amway Zaragoza.

== League of the Cup ==
=== Group stage ===
==== Group A ====
Pos	Team	Pld	W	L	PF	PA	PD	LEO	AND	BRE	PAM
1	Elmar León	6	5	1	551	523	+28		81–78	85–88	123–118
2	Festina Andorra	6	3	3	508	492	+16	86–88		94–79	83–80
3	Dyc Breogán	6	3	3	517	527	−10	80–86	77–76		89–100
4	Pamesa Valencia	6	1	5	544	578	−34	73–88	87–91	86–104	

==== Group B ====
Pos	Team	Pld	W	L	PF	PA	PD	TAU	OAR	ZAR	UNI
1	Taugrés Baskonia	6	4	2	501	452	+49		76–78	85–63	81–70
2	OAR Ferrol	6	3	3	450	425	+25	67–75		68–83	65–68
3	Natwest Zaragoza	6	3	3	451	505	−54	75–93	49–86		85–83
4	Unicaja Polti	6	2	4	484	504	−20	99–91	74–86	90–96	

=== Playoffs ===
The two first qualified teams of each group would play a last qualifying playoff against the four quarterfinalists of the 1993–94 season.

Team 1	Agg.	Team 2	1st leg	2nd leg	3rd leg
Caja San Fernando	0–2	Festina Andorra	96–99	85–101	
TDK Manresa	1–2	Taugrés Baskonia	94–83	77–80	78–82
Coren Ourense	0–2	Elmar León	74–82	81–84	
Cáceres CB	1–2	OAR Ferrol	73–69	63–65	80–83

== Repechage playoff ==
As OAR Ferrol resigned to its berth in Liga ACB, a repechage playoff was played in December 1994 and January 1995. The winner of this best-of-three series would take the vacant spot at the Final Eight of the competition.

Team 1	Agg.	Team 2	1st leg	2nd leg	3rd leg
Cáceres CB	1–2	Amway Zaragoza	85–89	97–90	91–98

== Final Eight Bracket ==
Quarterfinals; March 2, 3
Real Madrid	88
Baloncesto León	74
7Up Joventut	89
Taugrés Baskonia	96
FC Barcelona Banca Catalana	61
Amway Zaragoza	66
Estudiantes Caja Postal	87
Festina Andorra	86

Semifinals; March 4
Real Madrid	79
Taugrés Baskonia	86
Amway Zaragoza	84
Estudiantes Caja Postal	75

Final; March 5
Taugrés Baskonia	88
Amway Zaragoza	80
Third place
Real Madrid	66
Estudiantes Caja Postal	76

== Final ==
5 March 1995
20:00 GTM+1

Boxscore

Taugrés Baskonia	88–80	Amway Zaragoza
Scoring by half: 40–39, 48–41
Pts: Green 20; Rebs: Green 20; Asts: Laso 7 PIR: Green 32		Pts: Bannister 20; Rebs: Bannister, Murcia 5 Asts: Turner 5 PIR: three players 15

Palacio de Deportes, Granada
Attendance: 7,500
Referees: Francisco Javier Fajardo, Manuel Guillén

1995 Copa del Rey champions

First title

- MVP of the Tournament: Pablo Laso
