= Carlos Suárez (basketball) =

Spanish basketball player (born 1986)

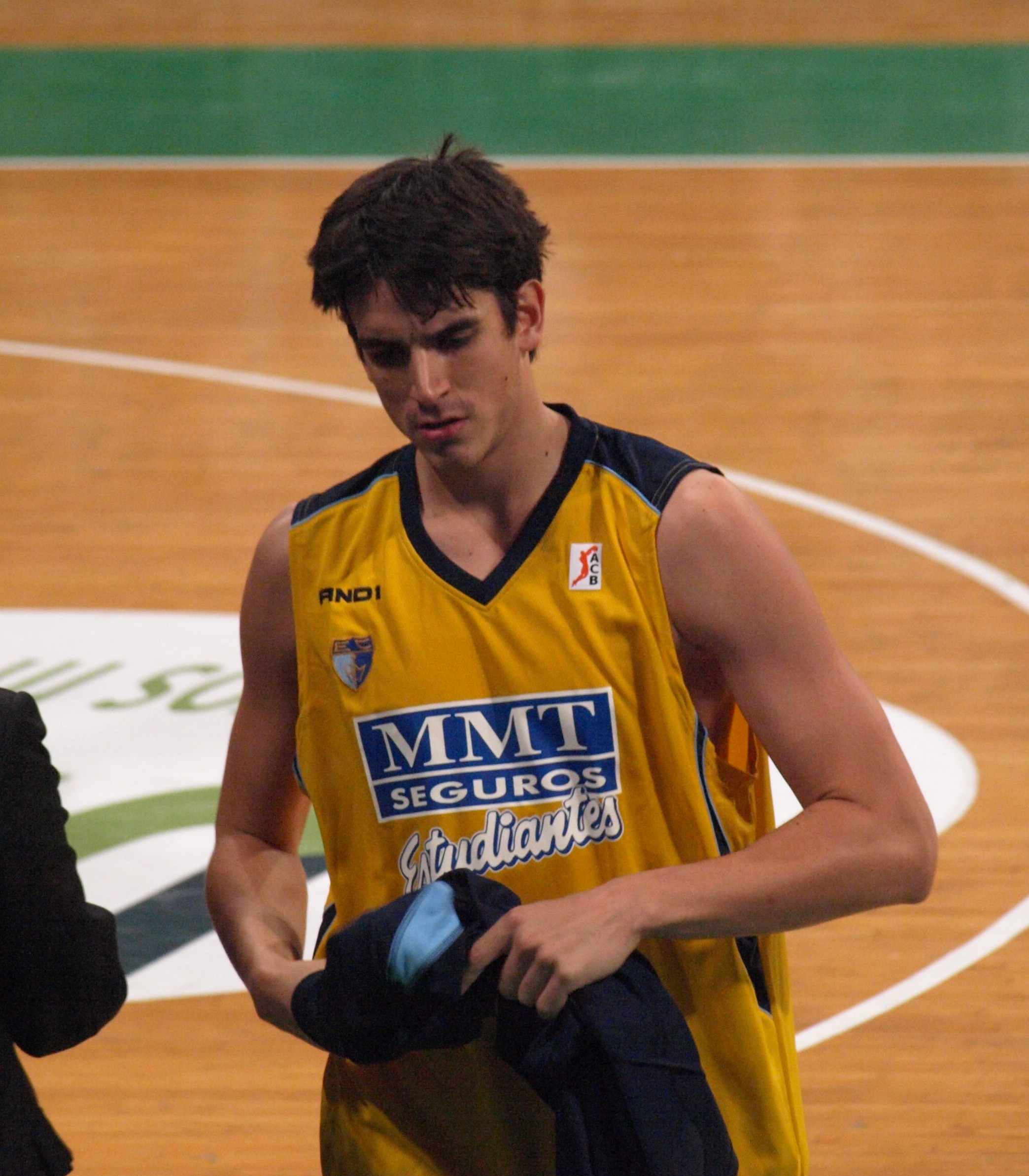
- Carlos Suárez with Estudiantes in 2008

Personal information
- Born: May 23, 1986 (age 40) Aranjuez, Spain
- Listed height: 6 ft 8 in (2.03 m)
- Listed weight: 230 lb (104 kg)

Career information
- NBA draft: 2008: undrafted
- Playing career: 2004–2024
- Position: Small forward / power forward
- Number: 15

Career history
- 2004–2010: Estudiantes
- 2010–2013: Real Madrid
- 2013–2022: Unicaja Málaga
- 2022–2023: San Pablo Burgos
- 2023–2024: Estudiantes

Career highlights
- Liga ACB champion (2013); EuroCup champion (2017); Copa del Rey winner (2012); Supercopa de España winner (2012); Copa Princesa de Asturias winner (2024); All-ACB Team (2010); ACB Rising Star Award (2006)
Medals
Men's basketball
Representing Spain
FIBA Europe Under-18 Championship
Gold medal – first place	2004 Spain	Team

Carlos Suárez García-Osorio (born May 23, 1986) is a Spanish former professional basketball player. Standing at a height of 6 ft 8 in (2.03 m), he played at the small forward and power forward positions.

== Professional career ==
Carlos Suárez joined the Liga ACB club Estudiantes's senior team during the 2005, rising from club's junior team ranks.

In September 2010, he signed a four-year contract with Real Madrid. With Madrid, Suárez won the Liga ACB in the 2013 season, and the Spanish Cup and Supercup in 2012.

In August 2013, Suárez signed a 1+1 year contract with Unicaja. In February 2015, he extended his contract for 2 more seasons.

In the 2016–17 season, Suárez won the EuroCup with Unicaja after beating Valencia Basket in the Finals. He signed a two-year contract extension on June 14, 2020.

== Spain national team ==
In July 2010, Suárez played for the first time with the senior Spain national team, but did not make the final 12-man roster for the 2010 FIBA World Championship.

== Career statistics ==
Legend
GP	Games played	GS	Games started	MPG	Minutes per game
FG%	Field-goal percentage	3P%	3-point field-goal percentage	FT%	Free-throw percentage
RPG	Rebounds per game	APG	Assists per game	SPG	Steals per game
BPG	Blocks per game	PPG	Points per game	PIR	Performance index rating
**Bold**	Career high

=== EuroLeague ===
*	Led the league

Year	Team	GP	GS	MPG	FG%	3P%	FT%	RPG	APG	SPG	BPG	PPG	PIR
2004–05	Estudiantes	6	2	14.3	**.720**	**.500**	.667	2.0	.5	.3	—	**8.2**	8.8
2010–11	Real Madrid	23*	21	23.5	.364	.329	.800	**4.3**	1.7	.5	.1	6.5	**9.3**
2011–12	Real Madrid	16	15	18.4	.415	.243	**.846**	2.6	1.3	**.9**	**.2**	4.6	6.8
2012–13	Real Madrid	29	**26**	17.0	.385	.280	.593	3.0	1.3	.3	.1	3.6	5.2
2013–14	Málaga	24	7	**24.5**	.317	.301	.833	4.0	2.1	.6	**.2**	5.5	8.2
2014–15	Málaga	18	5	19.9	.357	.255	.810	4.2	1.4	.4	**.2**	5.5	8.2
2015–16	Málaga	24	9	18.5	.307	.255	.735	3.5	1.8	.8	**.2**	3.9	6.4
2017–18	Málaga	**30**	7	19.0	.389	.352	**.846**	3.5	**2.2**	.4	.1	5.4	9.2
Career		170	92	19.9	.372	.297	.781	3.5	1.7	.5	.1	5.1	7.6

== Awards and accomplishments ==
=== Team awards ===
- EuroCup: 2016–17
- Copa del Rey: 2012
- Supercopa de España: 2012
- Liga ACB: 2012–13
- Copa Princesa de Asturias: 2024

=== Individual awards ===
- ACB Rising Star Award: 2005–06
- All-ACB Team: 2009–10
