= 2018 Supercopa de España de Baloncesto =

2018 Supercopa Endesa
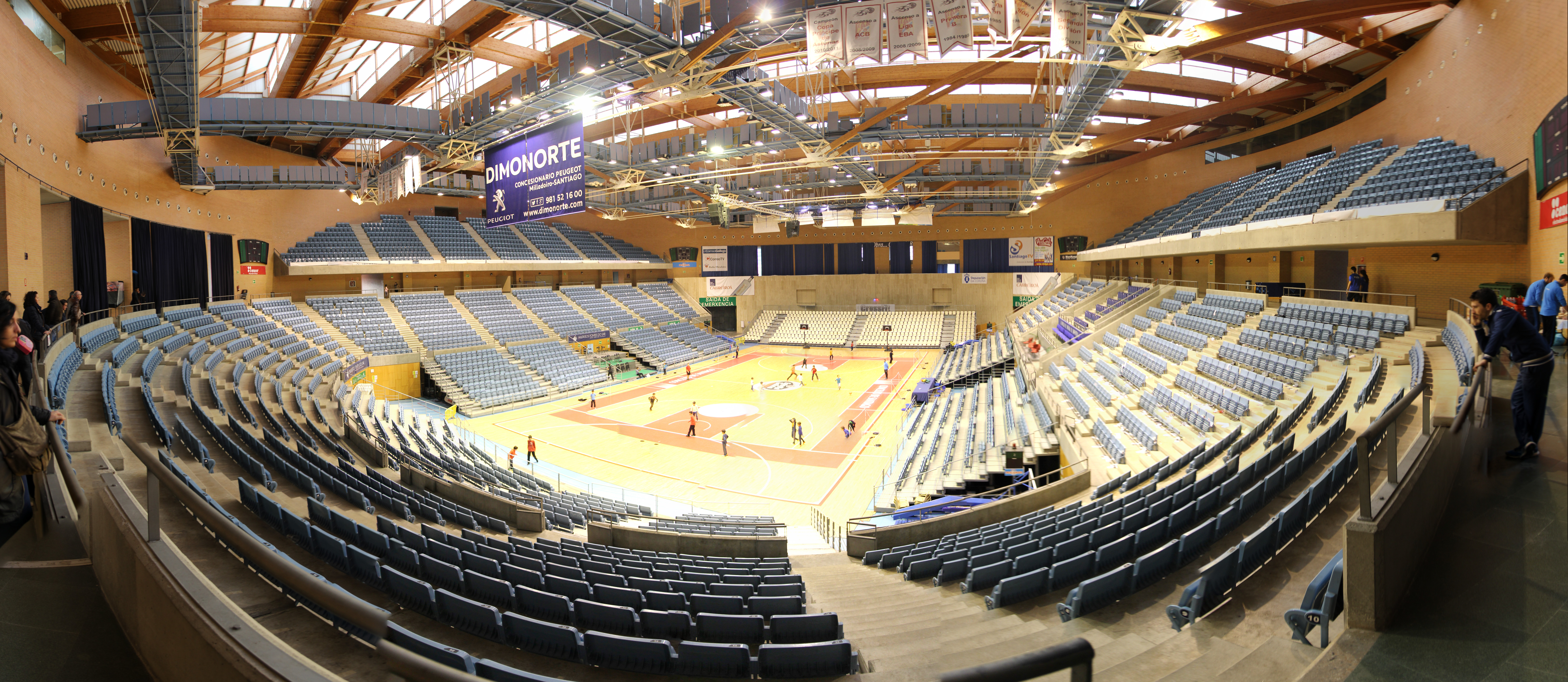
- The Multiusos Fontes do Sar hosted the Supercopa

Tournament details
- Arena: Multiusos Fontes do Sar; Santiago de Compostela, Spain
- Dates: 21–22 September 2018

Final positions
- Champions: Real Madrid (5th title)
- Runners-up: Kirolbet Baskonia

Awards and statistics
- MVP: (Spain) Sergio Llull

The 2018 Supercopa de España de Baloncesto was the 15th edition of the tournament since it is organized by the ACB and the 19th overall. It was also called Supercopa Endesa for sponsorship reasons. It was played in the Multiusos Fontes do Sar in Santiago de Compostela in September 2018. Valencia Basket was the defending champion, but did not qualify for the competition.

All times were in Central European Summer Time (UTC+02:00).

== Participant teams and draw ==
On 8 June 2018, the ACB confirmed Santiago de Compostela to host the tournament.

The semifinals were drawn on 12 September 2018, in which Real Madrid and Barça Lassa were seeded teams, given their status as Liga Endesa and Copa del Rey champions, respectively.

Team	Qualified as	Appearance
Monbus Obradoiro	Host team	1st
Barça Lassa	Copa del Rey champion	14th
Real Madrid	Liga Endesa champion	16th
Kirolbet Baskonia	Liga Endesa runner-up	13th

== Semifinals ==
=== FC Barcelona Lassa vs. Kirolbet Baskonia ===
21 September 2018	FC Barcelona Lassa	76–79	Kirolbet Baskonia	Santiago de Compostela
19:00	Scoring by quarter: 21–22, 13–27, 22–17, 20–13
	Pts: Kuric 16; Rebs: Tomić 7 Asts: Pangos 8 PIR: Pangos 20	Boxscore	Pts: Garino 16; Rebs: Voigtmann 13; Asts: Granger, Huertas 5 PIR: Garino 18	Arena: Multiusos Fontes do Sar; Attendance: 5,295; Referees: Daniel Hierrezuelo, Emilio Pérez Pizarro, Carlos Peruga

Starters:			Pts	Reb	Ast
F	6	(United States) Chris Singleton	6	3	0
F	9	(Slovenia) Jaka Blažič	3	2	1
G	13	(France) Thomas Heurtel	0	2	5
F	30	(Spain) Víctor Claver	13	4	2
C	44	(Croatia) Ante Tomić	9	7	1
Reserves:					
C	1	(France) Kevin Séraphin	DNP		
G	3	(Canada) Kevin Pangos	10	1	8
F	10	(Latvia) Rolands Šmits	9	4	0
C	14	(Ukraine) Artem Pustovyi	0	1	0
F	18	(Spain) Pierre Oriola	8	5	0
F	22	(Spain) Aleix Font	2	1	0
G	24	(United States) Kyle Kuric	16	3	0
Head coach:
(Serbia) Svetislav Pešić

Barça Lassa	Kirolbet Baskonia

Barça	Statistics	Baskonia
17/34 (50%)	2 point field goals	17/35 (48%)
9/25 (36%)	3 point field goals	10/25 (40%)
15/16 (93%)	Free throws	15/19 (78%)
34	Rebounds	33
17	Assists	19
6	Steals	7
15	Turnovers	14
4	Blocks	3

Starters:			Pts	Reb	Ast
C	7	(Germany) Johannes Voigtmann	5	13	0
G	11	(Georgia (country)) Matt Janning	6	2	1
G	15	(Uruguay) Jayson Granger	8	1	5
C	17	(France) Vincent Poirier	10	8	2
F	31	(Denmark) Shavon Shields	13	1	1
Reserves:					
G	3	(Argentina) Luca Vildoza	0	0	1
F	8	(Lithuania) Tadas Sedekerskis	DNP		
G	9	(Brazil) Marcelo Huertas	6	0	5
C	12	(Spain) Ilimane Diop	5	1	1
F	23	(Georgia (country)) Tornike Shengelia	7	4	2
F	29	(Argentina) Patricio Garino	16	0	0
G	32	(United States) Darrun Hilliard	3	1	1
Head coach:
(Spain) Pedro Martínez

=== Monbus Obradoiro vs. Real Madrid ===
21 September 2018	Monbus Obradoiro	61–81	Real Madrid	Santiago de Compostela
21:30	Scoring by quarter: 12–20, 22–20, 8–28, 19–13
	Pts: Vasileiadis 15; Rebs: Llovet 5 Asts: Navarro 5 PIR: Navarro 17	Boxscore	Pts: Llull 17; Rebs: Ayón, Carroll 6 Asts: Llull 6 PIR: Llull 19	Arena: Multiusos Fontes do Sar; Attendance: 5,471; Referees: Juan Carlos García González, Miguel Ángel Pérez Pérez, Rafael Serrano

Starters:			Pts	Reb	Ast
F	7	(United States) Benjamin Simons	5	2	0
F	9	(Spain) Nacho Llovet	0	5	0
C	32	(Iceland) Tryggvi Hlinason	4	3	0
G	44	(Spain) Pepe Pozas	2	2	4
F	77	(Greece) Kostas Vasileiadis	15	2	1
Reserves:					
G	3	(Spain) Albert Sàbat	14	3	0
F	8	(United States) Kendall Stephens	6	2	0
G	11	(Slovakia) Vladimir Brodziansky	2	4	0
F	13	(Germany) Andreas Obst	2	1	0
G	16	(Sweden) Nick Spires	4	1	0
F	20	(Andorra) David Navarro	7	3	5
C	54	(Latvia) Mārtiņš Laksa	DNP		
Head coach:
(Spain) Moncho Fernández

Monbus Obradoiro	Real Madrid

Obradoiro	Statistics	Madrid
11/34 (32%)	2 point field goals	22/37 (59%)
8/25 (32%)	3 point field goals	9/24 (37%)
15/17 (88%)	Free throws	10/16 (62%)
30	Rebounds	39
10	Assists	23
3	Steals	6
13	Turnovers	10
1	Blocks	2

Starters:			Pts	Reb	Ast
G	1	(France) Fabien Causeur	7	2	1
F	3	(Slovenia) Anthony Randolph	12	5	1
C	22	(Cape Verde) Edy Tavares	6	4	1
G	23	(Spain) Sergio Llull	17	1	6
F	44	(Sweden) Jeffery Taylor	8	2	1
Reserves:					
F	5	(Spain) Rudy Fernández	2	4	3
G	7	(Argentina) Facundo Campazzo	4	1	5
F	9	(Spain) Felipe Reyes	4	1	0
C	14	(Mexico) Gustavo Ayón	4	6	3
G	20	(Azerbaijan) Jaycee Carroll	5	6	2
F	24	(Argentina) Gabriel Deck	10	2	0
G	25	(Slovenia) Klemen Prepelič	2	1	0
Head coach:
(Spain) Pablo Laso

== Final ==
22 September 2018	Real Madrid	80–73	Kirolbet Baskonia	Santiago de Compostela
19:15	Scoring by quarter: 20–21, 22–23, 19–18, 19–11
	Pts: Llull 15; Rebs: Fernández 7 Asts: Llull, Taylor 3 PIR: Llull 15	Boxscore	Pts: Shields 14; Rebs: Poirier 7 Asts: Hilliard 4 PIR: Diop 14	Arena: Multiusos Fontes do Sar; Attendance: 5,314; Referees: Daniel Hierrezuelo, Emilio Pérez Pizarro, Miguel Ángel Pérez Pérez

Starters:			Pts	Reb	Ast
G	1	(France) Fabien Causeur	1	2	1
F	3	(Slovenia) Anthony Randolph	8	3	1
C	22	(Cape Verde) Edy Tavares	7	3	1
G	23	(Spain) Sergio Llull	15	2	3
F	44	(Sweden) Jeffery Taylor	0	6	3
Reserves:					
F	5	(Spain) Rudy Fernández	4	7	2
G	7	(Argentina) Facundo Campazzo	13	2	1
F	9	(Spain) Felipe Reyes	0	3	2
C	14	(Mexico) Gustavo Ayón	12	5	1
G	20	(Azerbaijan) Jaycee Carroll	5	0	1
F	24	(Argentina) Gabriel Deck	2	0	1
G	25	(Slovenia) Klemen Prepelič	13	0	0
Head coach:
(Spain) Pablo Laso

Real Madrid	Kirolbet Baskonia

Madrid	Statistics	Baskonia
19/36 (52%)	2 point field goals	20/41 (48%)
11/31 (35%)	3 point field goals	8/18 (44%)
9/14 (64%)	Free throws	9/14 (64%)
35	Rebounds	35
17	Assists	14
9	Steals	7
10	Turnovers	16
4	Blocks	3

Starters:			Pts	Reb	Ast
G	11	(Georgia (country)) Matt Janning	2	2	3
G	15	(Uruguay) Jayson Granger	5	1	0
C	17	(France) Vincent Poirier	11	7	0
F	23	(Georgia (country)) Tornike Shengelia	12	3	1
F	31	(Denmark) Shavon Shields	14	4	1
Reserves:					
G	3	(Argentina) Luca Vildoza	5	1	2
C	7	(Germany) Johannes Voigtmann	2	2	0
F	8	(Lithuania) Tadas Sedekerskis	DNP		
G	9	(Brazil) Marcelo Huertas	0	0	3
C	12	(Spain) Ilimane Diop	11	3	0
F	29	(Argentina) Patricio Garino	5	2	0
G	32	(United States) Darrun Hilliard	6	2	4
Head coach:
(Spain) Pedro Martínez

2018 Supercopa Endesa champions
Real Madrid
5th title
