= Jeffery Taylor =

Swedish basketball player (born 1989)

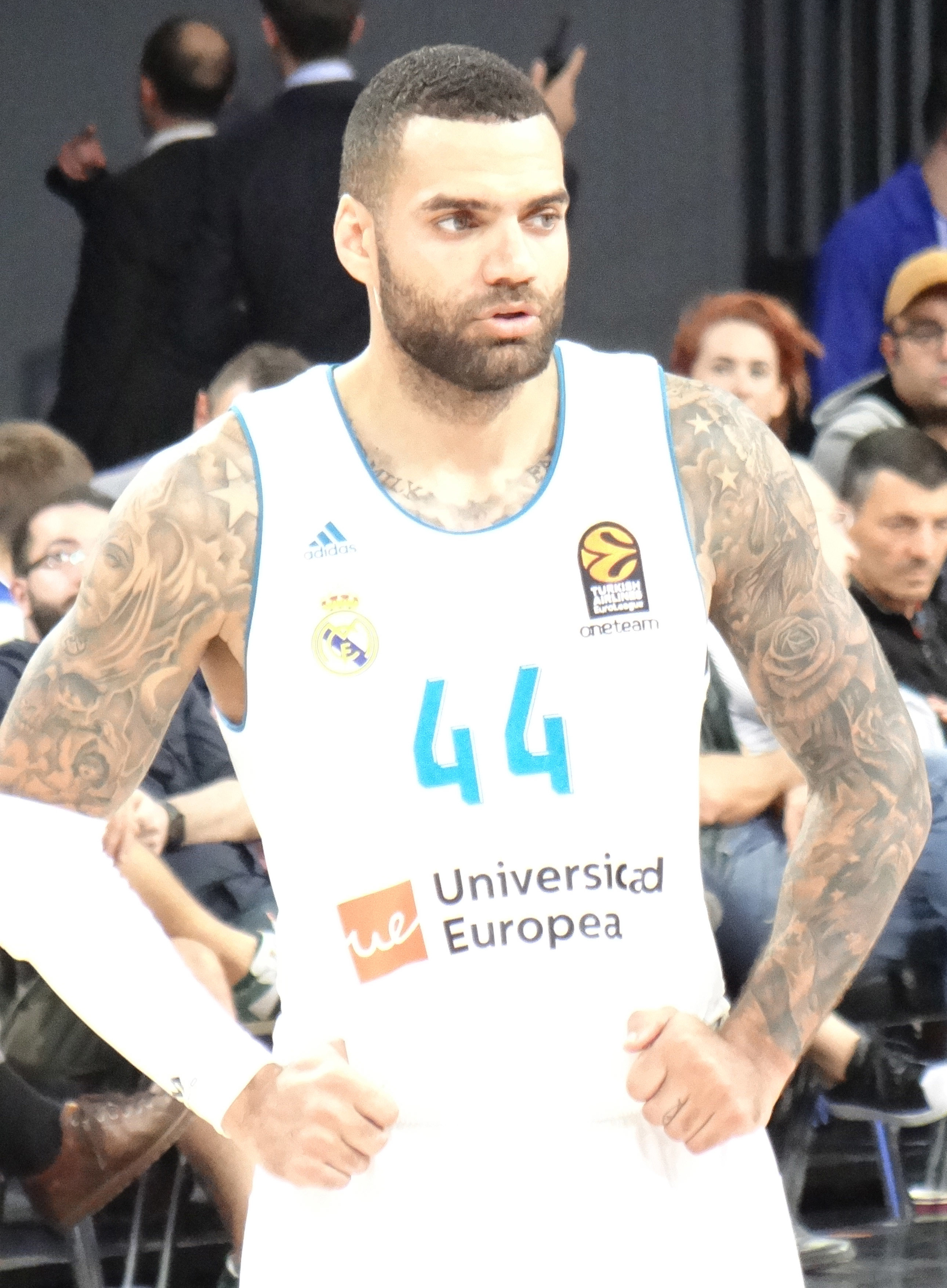
- Taylor with Real Madrid in 2017

No. 44 – Norrköping Dolphins
- Position: Small forward
- League: Basketligan

Personal information
- Born: May 23, 1989 (age 37) Norrköping, Sweden
- Listed height: 6 ft 7 in (2.01 m)
- Listed weight: 225 lb (102 kg)

Career information
- High school: Hobbs (Hobbs, New Mexico)
- College: Vanderbilt (2008–2012)
- NBA draft: 2012: 2nd round, 31st overall pick
- Drafted by: Charlotte Bobcats
- Playing career: 2012–present

Career history
- 2012–2015: Charlotte Bobcats / Hornets
- 2014–2015: →Austin Spurs
- 2015–2022: Real Madrid
- 2022–2025: Vilnius Wolves
- 2025–2026: U-BT Cluj-Napoca
- 2026–present: Norrköping Dolphins

Career highlights
- EuroLeague champion (2018); FIBA Intercontinental Cup champion (2015); 4× Liga ACB champion (2016, 2018, 2019, 2022); 3× Spanish Cup winner (2016, 2017, 2020); 4× Spanish Super Cup winner (2018–2021); Romanian League champion (2026); Romanian Cup winner (2026); Romanian Super Cup winner (2026); First-team All-SEC (2012); 2× Second-team All-SEC (2010, 2011); 3× SEC All-Defensive team (2010–2012)
- Stats at NBA.com
- Stats at Basketball Reference

Jeffery Matthew Taylor (born May 23, 1989) is a Swedish-American professional basketball player for Norrköping Dolphins of the Basketligan. He played college basketball for Vanderbilt University, before being drafted 31st overall by the Charlotte Bobcats in the 2012 NBA draft.

== High school career ==
Considered a four-star recruit by Rivals.com, Taylor was listed as the No. 10 small forward and the No. 52 player in the nation in 2008.

== College career ==
After Taylor's freshman season of 2008–09, DraftExpress.com said, "One of the most pleasant surprises in last season’s mediocre SEC [Southeastern Conference] was the emergence of Vanderbilt freshman Jeff Taylor." He averaged 12.2 points and 6.2 rebounds on his way to SEC All-Freshman honors. However, he showed one weakness in an otherwise solid season by shooting only 22 percent from three-point range.

His sophomore season saw some progress, but also some cause for concern; one scout said near the end of the season, "while he is improved in many areas, he has regressed in some as well." Taylor improved his scoring average to 13.3 per game, but his rebounding dropped slightly to 5.2 per game. The most obvious issue was his perimeter shooting, which saw a decline; he attempted only 11 three-pointers and made only one. Nonetheless, he was named to the All-SEC second team by the league's coaches, and was also named to the SEC All-Defensive Team.

In 2010–11, he further established his reputation as a defensive stopper, frequently being called on to defend every position on the floor except center while again being named to the SEC All-Defensive Team. Taylor also improved his three-point shooting to a more respectable 34.5% while attempting more than twice as many shots from behind the arc as in his first two seasons combined. Averaging 14.7 points and 5.5 rebounds, he was again named second-team All-SEC.

Taylor was widely viewed as a potential early entry into the 2011 NBA draft, based mainly on his athleticism and defensive skills. However, he decided to stay at Vanderbilt for his senior season in 2011–12. His decision to return, along with those of fellow stars John Jenkins and Festus Ezeli, made the Commodores a likely preseason top-10 pick.

== Professional career ==
=== Charlotte Bobcats / Hornets (2012–2015) ===
Taylor was selected with 31st overall pick in the 2012 NBA draft by the Charlotte Bobcats. On July 13, 2012, he signed his first professional contract with the Bobcats.

On November 23, 2012, Taylor scored a career high 16 points in a 91–101 loss to the Atlanta Hawks.

On December 21, 2013, it was announced that Taylor would miss the remainder of the season with a torn right Achilles tendon. He had been averaging 8.0 points and 2.3 rebounds in 24.2 minutes per game.

After serving out his 24-game suspension by the NBA that was handed down to him in September 2014 for assaulting his girlfriend, Taylor was set to return to action with a stint in the NBA Development League with the Hornets' affiliate team, the Fort Wayne Mad Ants. However, with the maximum allowance of four NBA players already being on assignment to the Mad Ants, the flexible assignment rule was used on December 28, 2014, so the Hornets could assign Taylor to the Austin Spurs, the San Antonio Spurs' one-to-one D-League affiliate. He was recalled by the Hornets on January 9, 2015.

On June 30, 2015, the Hornets decided not to extend a qualifying offer to Taylor, thus making him an unrestricted free agent.

=== Real Madrid (2015–2022) ===
On August 27, 2015, Taylor signed a one-year deal with the Spanish team Real Madrid.

In May 2018, Real Madrid won the 2017–18 EuroLeague championship, after defeating Fenerbahçe Doğuş in the final game with 85–80. Over 34 EuroLeague games, Taylor averaged 5.9 points, 1.9 rebounds and 1.2 assists per game.

=== BC Wolves (2022–2025) ===
On December 23, 2022, Taylor signed with BC Wolves of the Lithuanian Basketball League (LKL) until the end of the 2022–23 season. On May 24, 2023, Taylor renewed his contract with the Lithuanian club through 2025, with an option for an additional year.

=== U-BT Cluj-Napoca (2025–present) ===
On June 28, 2025, Taylor signed with U-BT Cluj-Napoca of the Romanian Liga Națională and the EuroCup.

== Career statistics ==
Legend
GP	Games played	GS	Games started	MPG	Minutes per game
FG%	Field-goal percentage	3P%	3-point field-goal percentage	FT%	Free-throw percentage
RPG	Rebounds per game	APG	Assists per game	SPG	Steals per game
BPG	Blocks per game	PPG	Points per game	PIR	Performance index rating
**Bold**	Career high

=== NBA ===
==== Regular season ====
Year	Team	GP	GS	MPG	FG%	3P%	FT%	RPG	APG	SPG	BPG	PPG
2012–13	Charlotte	**77**	**29**	19.6	**.431**	**.344**	**.728**	1.9	**.8**	**.6**	**.2**	6.1
2013–14	Charlotte	26	8	**24.2**	.376	.269	.553	**2.3**	**.8**	.5	**.2**	**8.0**
2014–15	Charlotte	29	13	14.8	.395	.306	.634	1.8	**.8**	.4	**.2**	4.4
Career		132	50	19.4	.409	.319	.665	2.0	.8	.5	.2	6.1

=== EuroLeague ===
†	Denotes seasons in which Taylor won the EuroLeague

Year	Team	GP	GS	MPG	FG%	3P%	FT%	RPG	APG	SPG	BPG	PPG	PIR
2015–16	Real Madrid	25	3	15.2	.473	.323	.611	**2.1**	.5	.2	**.1**	4.3	2.6
2016–17	Real Madrid	30	22	15.5	.500	.392	.667	1.8	.5	.4	**.1**	4.6	3.6
2017–18†	Real Madrid	**34**	**23**	**20.6**	.419	.352	.700	1.9	1.2	**.5**	**.1**	**5.9**	4.7
2018–19	Real Madrid	**34**	22	18.2	**.534**	**.448**	.630	1.6	**1.4**	.3	**.1**	5.6	**4.9**
2019–20	Real Madrid	24	14	18.6	.444	.393	.667	**2.1**	1.3	.4	**.1**	4.8	3.9
2020–21	Real Madrid	32	14	14.8	.430	.265	**.750**	1.5	.5	.4	**.1**	3.6	2.0
2021–22	Real Madrid	23	8	13.1	.466	.405	**.750**	1.2	.7	.3	**.1**	3.3	2.1
Career		202	106	16.8	.466	.373	.681	1.7	.9	.4	.1	4.6	3.5

=== College ===
Year	Team	GP	GS	MPG	FG%	3P%	FT%	RPG	APG	SPG	BPG	PPG
2008–09	Vanderbilt	31	31	26.0	.502	.220	.691	6.2	1.7	.9	.4	12.2
2009–10	Vanderbilt	33	33	26.8	.493	.091	.746	5.2	1.7	1.1	.4	13.3
2010–11	Vanderbilt	34	33	31.7	.449	.345	.719	5.5	2.4	1.0	.6	14.7
2011–12	Vanderbilt	36	36	32.1	.493	.423	.605	5.6	1.7	1.3	.4	16.1

== International career ==
Taylor participated in the 2013 edition of the EuroBasket. It was his first official appearance with the Swedish senior squad. He was Sweden's top scorer, averaging 21.2 points per game, along with 4.6 rebounds per game.

== Personal life ==
Taylor is the second-oldest of the six children of Jeff Taylor, who briefly played in the NBA before playing in Sweden, where he lived until his death. While the younger Taylor is a citizen of both Sweden and the United States by birth, he played for Norrköping Dolphins youth team, and has lived in the U.S. since 2006, he has said, "...if someone asks where I'm from, I say Sweden." However, he grew up steeped in the basketball culture of Hobbs, New Mexico, where his father was a high school star in the late 1970s:

I just always wanted to be a Hobbs High School Eagle. It’s kind of a thing I always grew up with. I heard stories about their crowds and stuff like that.

Taylor left Sweden for Hobbs in 2006, at the age of 17, moving in with his grandmother. Besides his desire to play at his father's alma mater, he determined that playing high school basketball in America would enhance his college basketball prospects. He quickly drew major interest from NCAA Division I programs, especially after a senior season when he averaged more than 30 points while leading Hobbs to a state title.

Taylor, named one of the top 150 recruits in the country by ESPN, considered about a half-dozen schools before narrowing his choices to Vanderbilt and Texas, eventually choosing Vanderbilt. He was one of three top-150 recruits signed by Commodores head coach Kevin Stallings in 2008.

=== Assault ===
On September 25, 2014, Taylor was arrested at a hotel in East Lansing, Michigan, charged with one count of domestic assault, assault, and malicious destruction of property. He was later suspended by the NBA for 24 games without pay after he pleaded guilty to the charges. He also received a one-year suspension from the Swedish national team.

== See also ==
- List of people banned or suspended by the NBA
