= 2014 Supercopa de España de Baloncesto =

2014 Supercopa Endesa
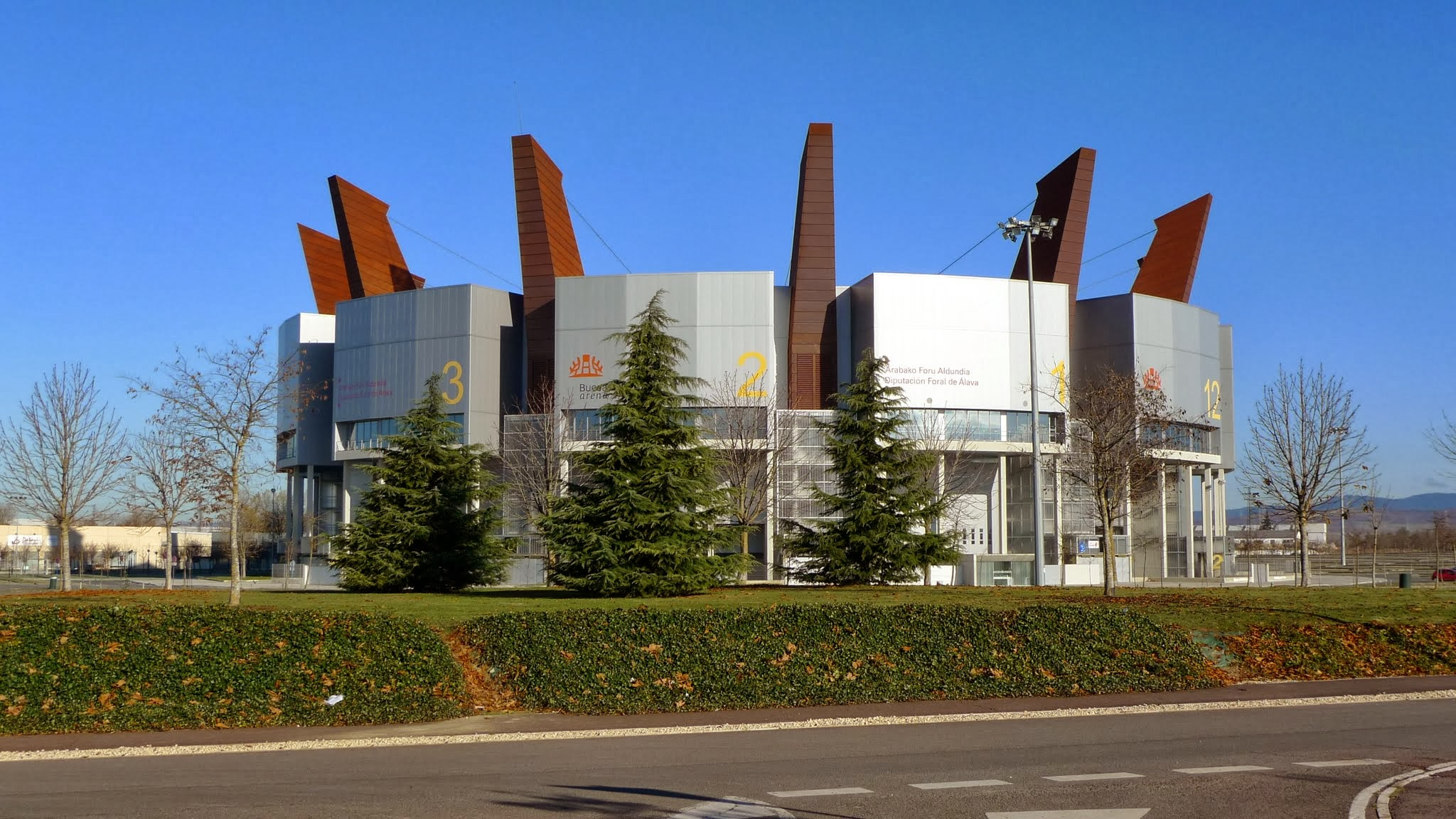
- The Fernando Buesa Arena hosted the Supercopa

Tournament details
- Arena: Fernando Buesa Arena; Vitoria-Gasteiz, Spain
- Dates: 26 September 2014– 27 September 2014

Final positions
- Champions: Real Madrid; 4th title
- Runners-up: FC Barcelona

Awards and statistics
- MVP: (Spain) Sergio Llull
- Top scorer(s): (Spain) Sergio Llull – 37

The Supercopa de España de Baloncesto 2014 is the 11th edition of the tournament, since it is organized by the ACB. It is also called Supercopa Endesa for sponsorship reasons.

It was played in the Fernando Buesa Arena in Vitoria-Gasteiz on September 26 and 27.

== Participant teams ==
On 20 May 2014, the ACB announced the three first participants. The fourth participant was announced on 16 June 2014, after FC Barcelona qualified for the 2013–14 ACB Finals.

Team	Qualification	Participation
Laboral Kutxa Baskonia	Host team	10th
FC Barcelona	2013–14 ACB champion	11th
Real Madrid	2014 Copa del Rey champion	12th
Valencia Basket	2013–14 Eurocup champion	3rd

== Semifinals ==
The draw of the semifinals was on September 10, 2014, and it was held in the Palacio Escoriaza-Esquivel, Vitoria-Gasteiz.

La 1

26 September 2014
19:00

Boxscore

Real Madrid	89–76	Valencia Basket
Scoring by quarter: 19–26, 24–17, 17–15, 29–18
Pts: Fernández 21; Rebs: Reyes 6 Asts: Fernández, Llull 3 PIR: Fernández 24		Pts: Lončar 17; Rebs: Harangody 9 Asts: Ribas 7 PIR: Lončar 17

Fernando Buesa Arena, Vitoria-Gasteiz
Referees: Martín Bertrán, García González, Peruga

FORTA

26 September 2014
21:30

Boxscore

Laboral Kutxa Baskonia	66–95	FC Barcelona
Scoring by quarter: 16–31, 13–18, 17–22, 20–24
Pts: Heurtel 17; Rebs: Iverson 7 Asts: Heurtel 5 PIR: Heurtel 22		Pts: Abrines 16; Rebs: Tomić 7 Asts: Huertas 4 PIR: Satoranský 20

Fernando Buesa Arena, Vitoria-Gasteiz
Attendance: 8,226
Referees: Pérez Pizarro, Pérez Pérez, Cortés

== Final ==
La 1

27 September 2014
19:00

Boxscore

Real Madrid	99–78	FC Barcelona
Scoring by quarter: 29–14, 20–25, 22–20, 28–20
Pts: Llull 21; Rebs: Fernández 5 Asts: Rodríguez 6 PIR: Llull 24		Pts: Tomić 15; Rebs: Doellman 7 Asts: Huertas 6 PIR: Tomić 18

Fernando Buesa Arena, Vitoria-Gasteiz
Attendance: 8,452
Referees: Pérez Pizarro, García González, Pérez Pérez
