= 2012 Copa del Rey de Baloncesto =

Copa del Rey 2012
- League: Copa del Rey
- Sport: Basketball
- Finals champions: Real Madrid
- Runners-up: FC Barcelona Regal
- Finals MVP: (Spain) Sergio Llull

Copa del Rey seasons
- ← 2010–11 2012–13 →

The Copa del Rey de Baloncesto 2011–12 was the 76th edition of the Spanish King's Basketball Cup. It was managed by the ACB League and was held in Barcelona, in the Palau Sant Jordi on February 16–19.

It was the first time the Cup was played in Barcelona since 1986.

== Bracket ==
Quarterfinals; February 16 & 17		Semifinals; February 18		Final; February 19
FC Barcelona Regal	75
Lucentum Alicante	54	FC Barcelona Regal	66
Caja Laboral	72	Caja Laboral	57
Lagun Aro GBC	65			FC Barcelona Regal	74
Unicaja	65			Real Madrid	91
Banca Cívica	75	Banca Cívica	84
Real Madrid	75	Real Madrid	92
Mad-Croc Fuenla.	66

=== Quarterfinals ===
FORTA & Teledeporte (Spain)

February 16
19:00 GTM+1

Report (in Spanish)

Caja Laboral	72–65	Lagun Aro GBC
Scoring by quarter: 17–16, 11–22, 27–11, 17–16
Pts: Bjelica 22; Rebs: Prigioni, Teletović 8 Asts: Prigioni 6		Pts: Baron 22; Rebs: Doblas 7 Asts: Doblas, Vidal 3

Palau Sant Jordi, Barcelona
Attendance: 11,400
Referees: J.A. Martín, Jiménez Trujillo, J. Araña

Teledeporte (Spain)

February 16
21:30 GTM+1

Report (in Spanish)

FC Barcelona Regal	75–53	Lucentum Alicante
Scoring by quarter: 17–13, 24–12, 21–10, 13–19
Pts: Lorbek 17; Rebs: Mickeal 10; Asts: Navarro 5		Pts: Llompart 14; Rebs: Llompart 7 Asts: Llompart 3

Palau Sant Jordi, Barcelona
Attendance: 14,500
Referees: D. Hierrezuelo, J.C. García González, C. Cortés

FORTA & Teledeporte (Spain)

February 17
19:00 GTM+1

Report (in Spanish)

Unicaja	65–77	Banca Cívica
Scoring by quarter: 12–16, 16–20, 14–20, 23–21
Pts: Valters, Darden 12; Rebs: Freeland 13; Asts: Valters 2		Pts: Calloway 16; Rebs: Rubio 7 Asts: Urtasun, Davis 3

Palau Sant Jordi, Barcelona
Attendance: 11,320
Referees: J.L. Redondo, A. Conde, L. Guirao

Teledeporte (Spain)

February 17
21:30 GTM+1

Report (in Spanish)

Real Madrid	75–66	Baloncesto Fuenlabrada
Scoring by quarter: 15–16, 20–15, 20–22, 20–13
Pts: Reyes 17; Rebs: Reyes 12; Asts: Rodríguez 5		Pts: Mainoldi 13; Rebs: Hall 6 Asts: Four players 2

Palau Sant Jordi, Barcelona
Attendance: 14,100
Referees: E. Pérez Pizarro, Ó. Perea, C. Peruga

=== Semifinals ===
Teledeporte (Spain)

February 18
18:00 GTM+1

Report (in Spanish)

FC Barcelona Regal	66–57	Caja Laboral
Scoring by quarter: 19–18, 15–15, 14–19, 18–5
Pts: Lorbek 26; Rebs: N'Dong 8 Asts: Eidson 4		Pts: Teletović 15; Rebs: Bjelica 8 Asts: Prigioni 4

Palau Sant Jordi, Barcelona
Attendance: 14,700
Referees: D. Hierrezuelo, J.L. Redondo, A. Conde

FORTA & Teledeporte (Spain)

February 18
20:30 GTM+1

Report (in Spanish)

Real Madrid	92–84	Banca Cívica
Scoring by quarter: 27–14, 19–30, 30–16, 16–24
Pts: Mirotić 21; Rebs: Suárez 10; Asts: Llull 7		Pts: Bogdanović 13; Rebs: Triguero 7 Asts: Calloway 9

Palau Sant Jordi, Barcelona
Attendance: 14,570
Referees: J.A. Martín Bertrán, J.C. García González, F.J. Araña

=== Final ===
Teledeporte (Spain)

February 19
18:00 GTM+1

Report (in Spanish)

FC Barcelona Regal	74–91	Real Madrid
Scoring by quarter: 17–22, 16–20, 23–23, 18–26
Pts: Navarro 16; Rebs: N'Dong 11; Asts: Navarro 5		Pts: Llull 23; Rebs: Mirotić 5 Asts: Llull 5

Palau Sant Jordi, Barcelona
Attendance: 15,128
Referees: D. Hierrezuelo, E. Pérez Pizarro, J.C. García González

Copa del Rey 2012 Champions
Real Madrid
23rd title
