= Víctor Claver =

Spanish basketball player (born 1988)

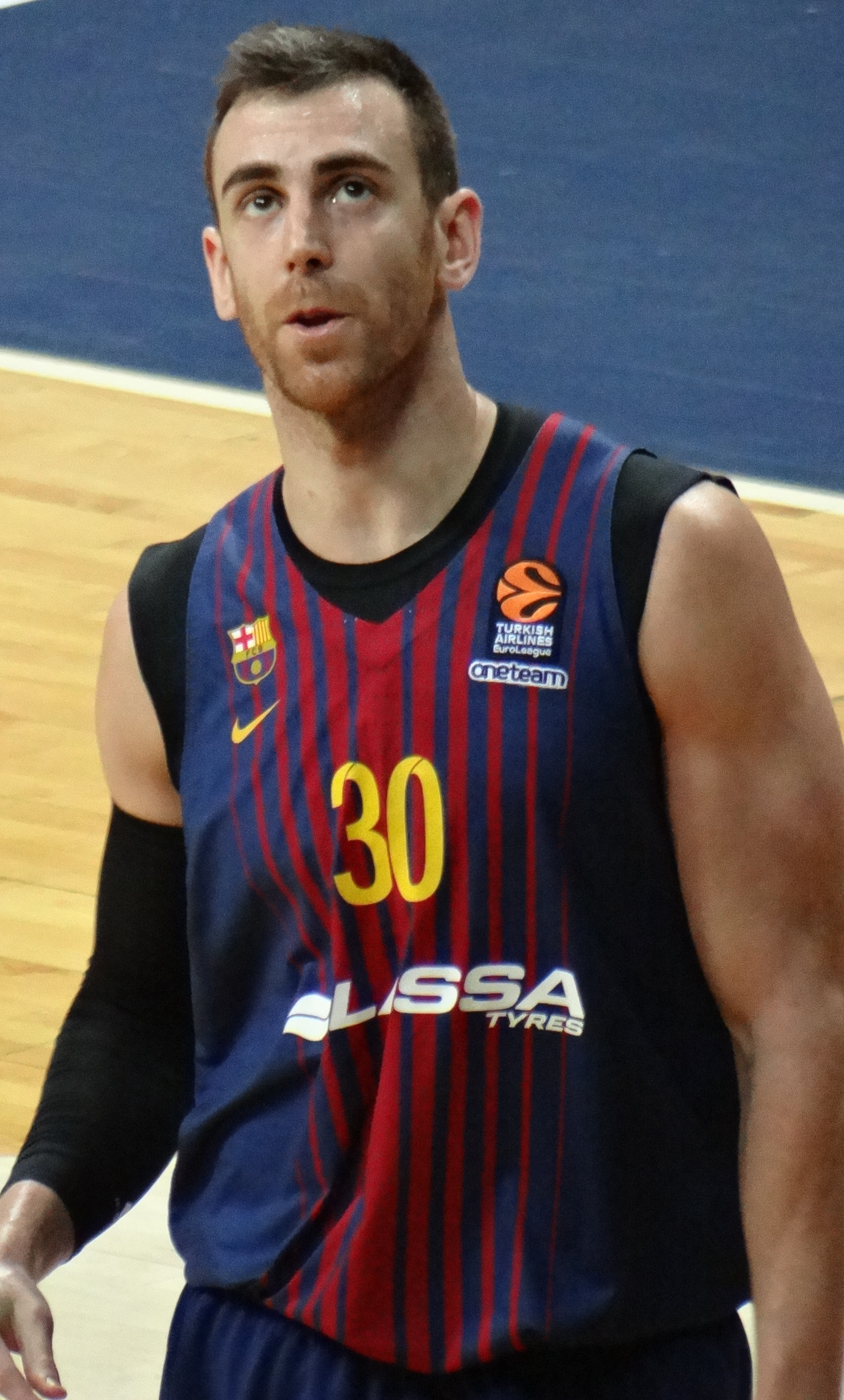
- Claver with Barcelona in EuroLeague 2018

Personal information
- Born: 30 August 1988 (age 38) Valencia, Spain
- Listed height: 6 ft 9.5 in (2.07 m)
- Listed weight: 224 lb (102 kg)

Career information
- NBA draft: 2009: 1st round, 22nd overall pick
- Drafted by: Portland Trail Blazers
- Playing career: 2006–2024
- Position: Power forward / small forward
- Number: 1, 18, 9, 10, 30

Career history
- 2006–2012: Valencia
- 2012–2015: Portland Trail Blazers
- 2015: Khimki Moscow
- 2015–2016: Lokomotiv Kuban
- 2016–2021: FC Barcelona
- 2021–2024: Valencia

Career highlights
- Liga ACB champion (2021); 2× EuroCup champion (2010, 2015); 3× Spanish Cup winner (2018, 2019, 2021); All-VTB United League Second Team (2016); EuroCup Rising Star (2010); Liga ACB All-Star Game Slam Dunk champion (2008)
- Stats at NBA.com
- Stats at Basketball Reference
Medals
Men's basketball
Representing Spain
Olympic Games
Silver medal – second place	2012 London	Team
Bronze medal – third place	2016 Rio de Janeiro	Team
World Cup
Gold medal – first place	2019 China
EuroBasket
Gold medal – first place	2009 Poland
Gold medal – first place	2011 Lithuania
Gold medal – first place	2015 France–Croatia–Germany–Latvia
Bronze medal – third place	2013 Slovenia
FIBA Europe Under-18 Championship
Bronze medal – third place	2006 Greece	U18 Team

Víctor Claver Arocas (born 30 August 1988) is a Spanish former professional basketball player who last served as the team captain for Valencia of the Spanish Liga ACB and the EuroLeague.

== Professional career ==
=== Valencia (2006–2012) ===
Claver began his playing career with the youth teams of his school, Sagrado Corazón HH. Maristas de Valencia, in Spain. He made his professional debut with Valencia during the 2006–07 season. He played in Europe's second-tier level competition, the EuroCup, for the first time during the 2007–08 season, and won it in the 2009–10 season.

He also played in the European top-tier level, EuroLeague, during the 2010–11 season, and averaged 10.9 points and 4.9 rebounds, over 14 games.

=== Portland Trail Blazers (2012–2015) ===
Claver was drafted 22nd overall by the Portland Trail Blazers in the 2009 NBA draft. On 12 July 2012, Claver signed a three-year deal with the Trail Blazers. He was assigned to the NBA D-League's Idaho Stampede on 7 December 2012, and recalled on 9 December 2012. The following day, he made his first NBA start, scoring 4 points in 25 minutes with 5 rebounds and 2 assists. Claver was reassigned to the Idaho Stampede on 14 December 2012, and recalled on 16 December 2012. He played 80 games for the Trail Blazers over the next three years.

On 19 February 2015, Claver was traded, along with Will Barton, Thomas Robinson and a lottery-protected 2016 first-round pick, to the Denver Nuggets in exchange for Arron Afflalo and Alonzo Gee. Three days later, he was waived by the Nuggets before playing in a game for them.

=== Khimki Moscow (2015) ===
On 1 March 2015, Claver signed with BC Khimki of Russia for the rest of the season. On 17 July 2015 Claver and Khimki parted ways.

=== Attempt to return to Spain ===
In August 2015, he had a deal with Baskonia, but Valencia using the right of first refusal, matched the offer, and kept his rights in Spain. Baskonia obviously was not eager to pay a buy out to Valencia, but the Spanish forward did not want to play in his old team. According to reports, he did not want to play in a team which in the next season was going to compete in the second-tier level EuroCup, which led to Claver signing with a team outside the Spanish borders.

=== Lokomotiv Kuban (2015–2016) ===
On 2 September 2015, the Russian team Lokomotiv Kuban announced a one-year deal with Claver for the 2015–16 season.

=== FC Barcelona (2016–2021) ===
On 20 July 2016, he signed a three-year deal with FC Barcelona Lassa, after his new team reached an agreement with Valencia for acquiring his rights. On 2 July 2019, he extended his contract with FC Barcelona through 2022. On 12 July 2021, Claver officially parted ways with the club after five years.

=== Return to Valencia (2021–2024) ===
On 13 July 2021, he signed a three-year deal with Valencia and he plays again for his hometown Valencia.

On 1 July 2024, Claver announced his retirement from professional basketball.

== National team career ==
He was on Spain's junior national teams that won bronze medals at the 2006 FIBA Europe Under-18 Championship, and at the 2008 FIBA Europe Under-20 Championship. He has also played with the Spain men's national basketball team. Spain's medal cache included: gold medals at the EuroBasket 2009, EuroBasket 2011 and at the EuroBasket 2015, and a bronze medal at the EuroBasket 2013.

He also played at the 2010 FIBA World Championship, the 2014 FIBA Basketball World Cup, at the 2012 Summer Olympics, where Spain won a silver medal, and at the 2016 Summer Olympics, where Spain won a bronze medal.

== Career statistics ==
Legend
GP	Games played	GS	Games started	MPG	Minutes per game
FG%	Field-goal percentage	3P%	3-point field-goal percentage	FT%	Free-throw percentage
RPG	Rebounds per game	APG	Assists per game	SPG	Steals per game
BPG	Blocks per game	PPG	Points per game	PIR	Performance index rating
**Bold**	Career high

=== NBA ===
==== Regular season ====
Year	Team	GP	GS	MPG	FG%	3P%	FT%	RPG	APG	SPG	BPG	PPG
2012–13	Portland	**49**	**16**	**16.6**	.392	.287	.467	**2.4**	**.9**	**.5**	**.2**	**3.8**
2013–14	Portland	21	0	8.8	.405	.167	**.909**	1.9	.6	.1	.1	2.2
2014–15	Portland	10	0	7.6	**.450**	**.545**	.000	2.0	.1	.1	.1	2.4
Career		80	16	13.4	.398	.293	.585	2.2	.7	.4	.2	3.2

==== Playoffs ====
Year	Team	GP	GS	MPG	FG%	3P%	FT%	RPG	APG	SPG	BPG	PPG
2014	Portland	2	0	3.5	.000	.000	.000	0.5	.0	.0	.0	.0

=== EuroLeague ===
*	Led the league

Year	Team	GP	GS	MPG	FG%	3P%	FT%	RPG	APG	SPG	BPG	PPG	PIR
2010–11	Valencia	14	14	**27.6**	.472	.368	.841	4.9	1.4	**1.4**	.4	**10.9**	12.1
2015–16	Lokomotiv	31*	**31***	27.0	.500	.400	.780	**5.9**	**1.6**	.8	**.5**	9.4	**13.5**
2016–17	Barcelona	27	19	22.0	.459	.377	.778	4.4	1.3	.9	.3	6.0	8.4
2017–18	Barcelona	24	6	16.0	.451	.422	.800	2.9	1.2	.6	.3	4.6	5.4
2018–19	Barcelona	**35**	25	21.2	.477	.339	.821	3.2	1.0	.6	.4	5.3	7.5
2019–20	Barcelona	17	15	21.2	**.507**	**.455**	**1.000**	3.0	**1.6**	.8	.2	5.7	7.9
2020–21	Barcelona	15	4	12.6	.481	.200	.714	1.9	.3	.4	.1	2.3	2.7
2022–23	Valencia	30	12	17.7	.471	.413	.815	2.6	.9	.8	.1	4.8	5.2
2023–24	Valencia	21	5	14.8	.403	.385	.750	2.1	.6	.4	—	3.4	3.2
Career		214	131	20.3	.474	.386	.812	3.5	1.1	.7	.3	5.8	7.5
