= 2012 Supercopa de España de Baloncesto =

The Supercopa de España de Baloncesto 2012 was the 9th edition of this tournament. It is also called Supercopa Endesa for sponsorship reasons.

It was played in the Pabellón Príncipe Felipe in Zaragoza. Real Madrid was the champion after defeating FC Barcelona Regal, the defending champion.

== Participant teams ==
Participant teams were known officially on 18 June 2012.

Team	Qualification	Appearance
Regal FC Barcelona	2011–12 Liga ACB champion	8th
Real Madrid	2012 Copa del Rey champion	7th
Valencia Basket	2011–12 Eurocup runner-up	2nd
CAI Zaragoza	Host team	2nd

== Semifinals ==
The draw of semifinals was made on 6 September 2012.

La 1

September 22
19:00 CEST

Stats

FC Barcelona Regal	77–63	Valencia BC
Scoring by quarter: 22–12, 16–20, 19–17, 20–14
Pts: Mickeal 15; Rebs: Lorbek 9 Asts: Huertas 5 PIR: Mickeal 24		Pts: Faverani 14; Rebs: Faverani 6 Asts: three players 2 PIR: Martínez 14

Pabellón Príncipe Felipe, Zaragoza
Attendance: 6,100
Referees: Pérez Pizarro, Conde, Peruga

FORTA

September 22
21:30 CEST

Stats

CAI Zaragoza	64–72	Real Madrid
Scoring by quarter: 17–21, 14–15, 9–22, 24–14
Pts: Rudež 17; Rebs: Aguilar 7 Asts: Roll 5 PIR: Roll 17		Pts: Mirotić 14; Rebs: Mirotić 11; Asts: Rodríguez 5 PIR: Mirotić 23

Pabellón Príncipe Felipe, Zaragoza
Attendance: 6,500
Referees: García González, Perea, Jiménez

== Final ==
La 1

September 23
19:00 CEST

Stats

FC Barcelona Regal	84–95	Real Madrid
Scoring by quarter: 23–30, 20–14, 13–21, 28–30
Pts: Jawai 20; Rebs: Ingles 5 Asts: Huertas 7 PIR: Ingles 21		Pts: Fernández 22; Rebs: three players 5 Asts: Rodríguez 3 PIR: Fernández 25

Pabellón Príncipe Felipe, Zaragoza
Attendance: 7,000
Referees: Pérez Pizarro, Conde, García González

Supercopa de España 2012
Champions
Real Madrid
Second title
