= Usman Garuba =

Spanish basketball player (born 2002)

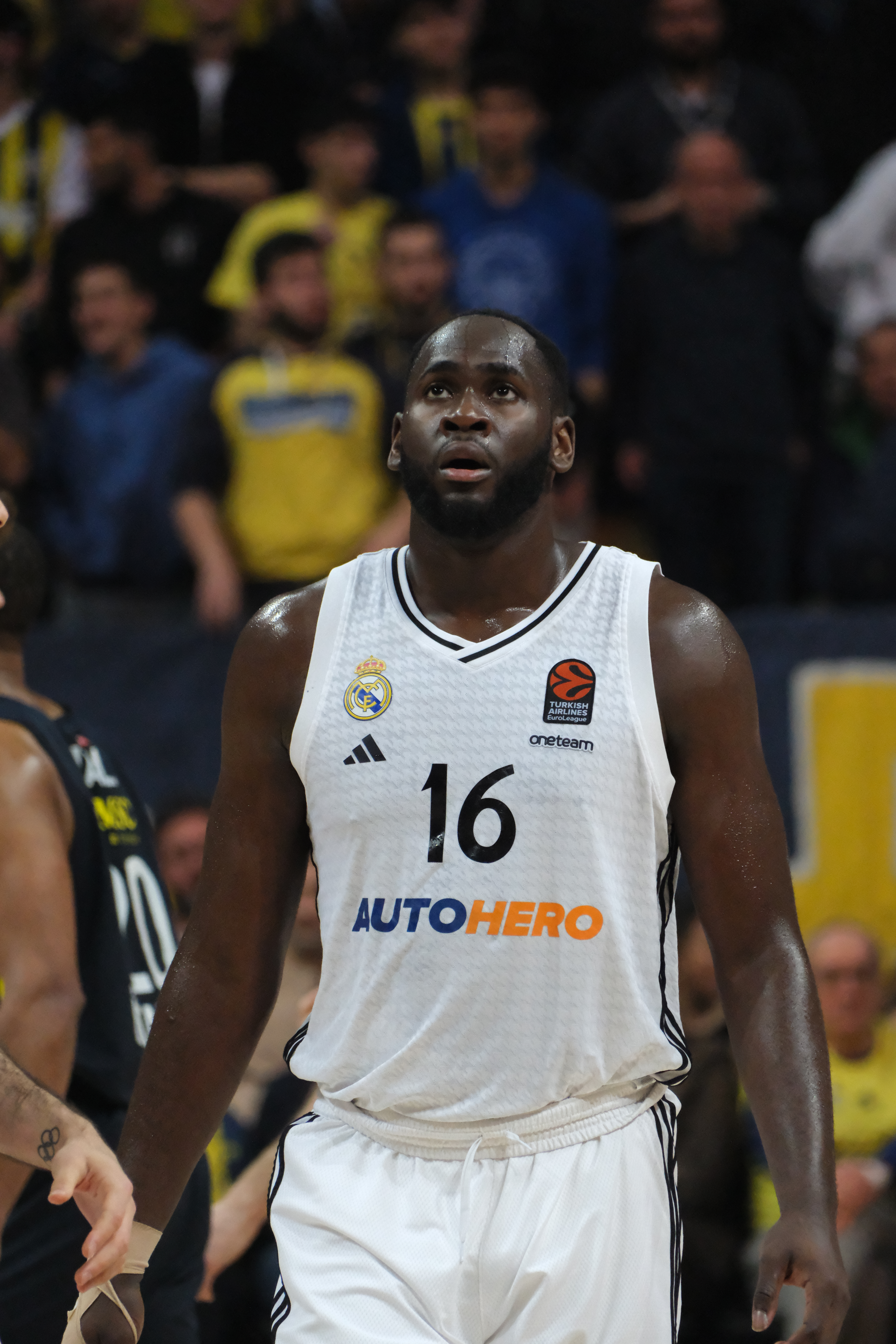
- Garuba with Real Madrid in 2025

No. 16 – Real Madrid
- Position: Center / power forward
- League: Liga ACB; EuroLeague

Personal information
- Born: 9 March 2002 (age 24) Madrid, Spain
- Listed height: 6 ft 8 in (2.03 m)
- Listed weight: 253 lb (115 kg)

Career information
- NBA draft: 2021: 1st round, 23rd overall pick
- Drafted by: Houston Rockets
- Playing career: 2017–present

Career history
- 2017–2021: Real Madrid
- 2017–2019: →Real Madrid B
- 2021–2023: Houston Rockets
- 2021–2022: →Rio Grande Valley Vipers
- 2023–2024: Golden State Warriors
- 2023–2024: →Santa Cruz Warriors
- 2024–present: Real Madrid

Career highlights
- EuroLeague Rising Star (2021); 2× Liga ACB champion (2019, 2025); Spanish Supercup winner (2020); ACB Best Young Player (2021); 2× ACB All-Young Players Team (2020, 2021); EB Next Generation Tournament champion (2019); FIBA U16 European Championship MVP (2016)
- Stats at NBA.com
- Stats at Basketball Reference
Medals
Men's basketball
Representing Spain
EuroBasket
Gold medal – first place	2022 Czech Republic–Georgia–Italy–Germany
FIBA U18 European Championship
Gold medal – first place	2019 Greece	Team
FIBA U16 European Championship
Gold medal – first place	2016 Poland	Team
Silver medal – second place	2018 Serbia	Team

Destiny Usman Garuba Alari (born 9 March 2002) is a Spanish professional basketball player for Real Madrid of the Spanish Liga ACB and the EuroLeague. Listed at 2.03 m (6 ft 8 in), he plays at both the power forward and center positions.

Garuba was born in Madrid, Spain to Nigerian parents and joined the youth academy of Real Madrid at age 11. In 2019, when he was 17 years old, he became the youngest starter in Real Madrid history. In the 2020–21 season, Garuba was named EuroLeague Rising Star and ACB Best Young Player. He earned most valuable player (MVP) honors at the 2016 FIBA U16 European Championship at age 14. In the 2021 NBA draft, he was selected by the Houston Rockets with the 23rd overall pick.

== Early life and youth career ==
Born in Hospital 12 de Octubre in Madrid, Garuba was raised in the neighborhood of Villaverde Bajo (Madrid) and the municipality of Azuqueca de Henares (province of Guadalajara). He grew up playing football, his original passion, but switched to basketball because his exceptional height limited his success in the former sport. Garuba idolized former NBA player Kareem Abdul-Jabbar. In November 2011, he joined Escuela Municipal de Baloncesto de Azuqueca (Municipal Basketball School of Azuqueca), where coach and coordinator David Serrano helped him start his basketball career and where he earned the nickname of "La pantera de Azuqueca" ("The Panther of Azuqueca").

In 2013, Garuba joined the lower categories of Real Madrid. He stood 1.89 m (6 ft 2 1/2 in) and weighed 81 kg (179 lb) by the time he was 12 years old. In 2015, Garuba helped his team win the Minicopa Endesa, an under-14 Spanish club tournament. He debuted by posting 24 points and 16 rebounds in a win over Valencia. In the following year, Garuba led Real Madrid to another Minicopa title and was named MVP of the competition. He averaged 22.8 rebounds per game in the tournament, grabbing 32 against Joventut Badalona in the final.

In February 2018, Garuba gained his first Adidas Next Generation Tournament (ANGT) experience with the Real Madrid under-18 team at the Munich qualifying tournament, after missing the previous edition with a quadriceps injury. He was selected to the All-Tournament Team, despite being one of the youngest participants. In the final tournament, Garuba averaged 12 points and 6.5 rebounds per game and was named ANGT Rising Star. In January 2019, he was named MVP of the ANGT Munich tournament after averaging 16.5 points, seven rebounds and 3.8 assists per game. Garuba helped Real Madrid win the final tournament and joined MVP Mario Nakić on the All-Tournament Team.

== Professional career ==
=== Real Madrid (2017–2021) ===
In the 2017–18 season, Garuba played for Real Madrid B, the reserve team for Real Madrid in the Liga EBA, the fourth-tier league in Spain. In 11 games, he averaged 11.1 points, 9.2 rebounds and 1.7 blocks per game. In the 2018–19 season, he continued to primarily play for Real Madrid B, averaging 14.6 points, 12.0 rebounds, 2.1 assists and 1.5 blocks per game over 22 Liga EBA appearances. On 28 October 2018, at 16 years and seven months of age, Garuba debuted for Real Madrid in the Liga ACB, the first-tier league in Spain, against Miraflores. He became the youngest center in ACB history, surpassing José Ángel Antelo, and the third-youngest Real Madrid debutant, behind Luka Dončić and Roberto Núñez.

In the 2019–20 season, Garuba became a full-time member of Real Madrid's senior team. In his season debut against Joventut Badalona, at 17 years, six months and 19 days of age, he eclipsed Dončić as Real Madrid's youngest-ever starter. On 29 September, Garuba recorded 13 points and 10 rebounds in a win over Murcia to become the youngest player with a double-double or 10 rebounds in ACB history; Dončić had previously held both records. He was also the second-youngest player to post an efficiency rating of 24 in the ACB, behind only Ricky Rubio. On 30 October 2019, Garuba made his EuroLeague debut, recording 12 points, four rebounds, three steals, and a Performance Index Rating (PIR) of 20, against Bayern Munich. He finished the season averaging 4.4 points, 4.4 rebounds and 0.7 blocks in 15 minutes per game in the ACB and EuroLeague and was an ACB All-Young Players Team selection.

On 22 December 2020, Garuba recorded 12 points, six rebounds, three assists and 25 PIR in a 91–62 win over Alba Berlin. On 18 April 2021, he posted 14 points and 12 rebounds in a 101–92 victory over Joventut Badalona. Garuba won the ACB Best Young Player Award and was named to the ACB All-Young Players Team for his second straight season. On 29 April, he recorded a career-high 24 points, 12 rebounds and 30 PIR, leading Real Madrid to an 82–76 win over Anadolu Efes in game 4 of the EuroLeague Playoffs. Garuba earned EuroLeague Rising Star honors after averaging 3.9 points and four rebounds per game in the competition.

=== Houston Rockets (2021–2023) ===
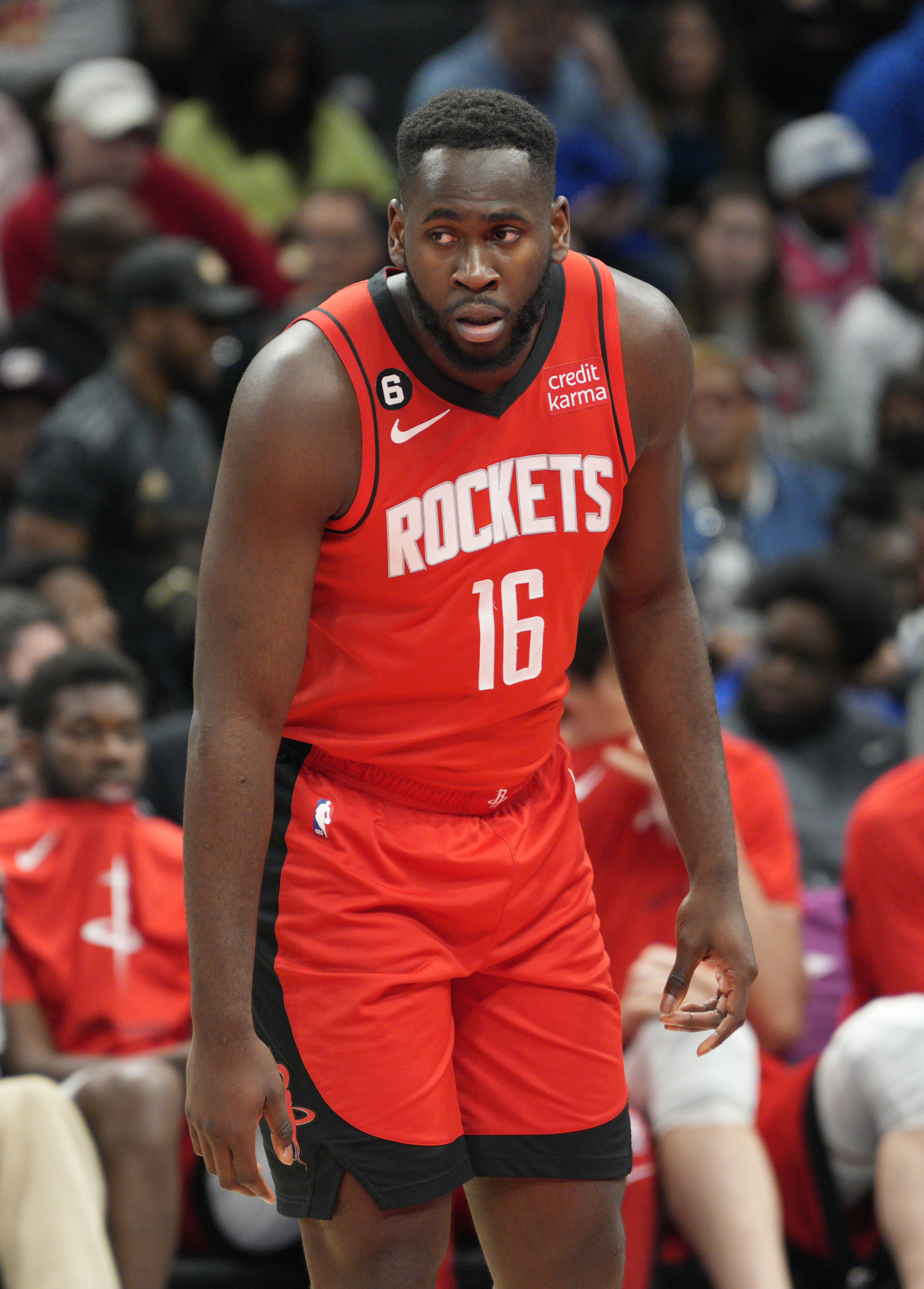
Garuba with the Rockets in 2023

In the 2021 NBA draft, he was drafted by the Houston Rockets with the 23rd overall pick during a run in the 2020 Tokyo Olympics. He made his 2021 NBA Summer League debut in a 92–76 loss versus the Toronto Raptors where he went scoreless along with six rebounds and one steal. On 16 August, he officially signed his rookie contract. On 5 October, he made his preseason debut off the bench against the Washington Wizards in a 125–119 loss with five points and a rebound in six minutes of action. On 26 January 2022, the Houston Rockets announced that Garuba had undergone successful surgery to repair his fractured left wrist and was expected to be sidelined for six to eight weeks.

On 8 July 2023, Garuba was traded to the Atlanta Hawks in a five-team trade. Four days later, he was traded once again to Oklahoma City Thunder alongside TyTy Washington Jr., Rudy Gay and a 2026 2nd round pick in exchange for Patty Mills and on 21 August, he was waived by the Thunder.

=== Golden State Warriors (2023–2024) ===
On 25 September 2023, Garuba signed a two-way contract with the Golden State Warriors and their NBA G League affiliate, the Santa Cruz Warriors and on 14 April 2024, he signed a standard contract with Golden State.

=== Return to Real Madrid (2024–present) ===
On 20 August 2024, Garuba returned to Real Madrid, signing for three years.

In September 2024, Garuba suffered an injury to his left foot.

In May 2026, Garuba suffered a complete tear of his left Achilles tendon.

== National team career ==
=== Junior national team ===
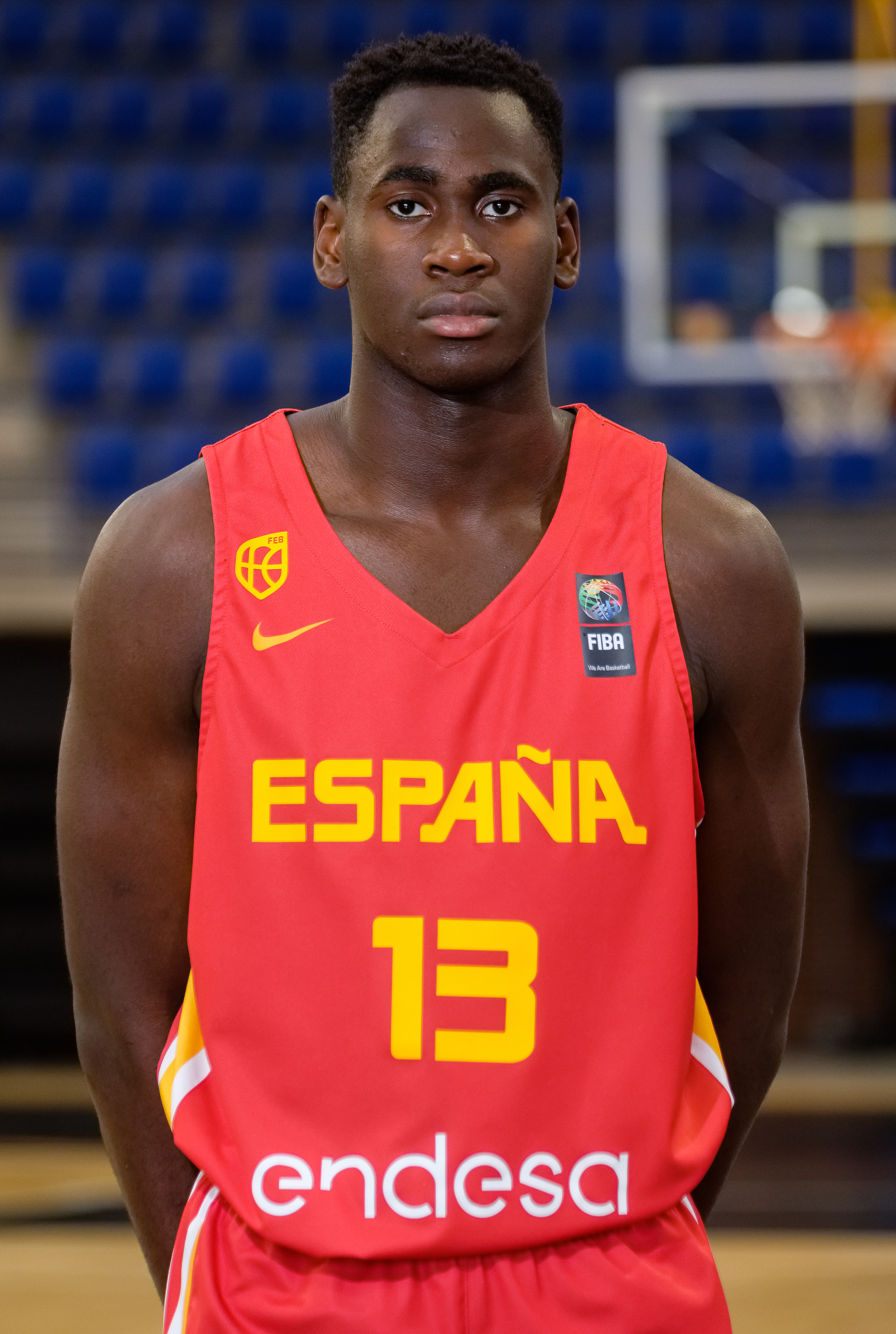
Garuba with the Spain under-18 team in 2019

Garuba made his junior national team debut for Spain at the 2016 FIBA U16 European Championship in Radom, Poland. He was named MVP after leading his team to a gold medal and averaging 16.3 points, 12.4 rebounds, and a tournament-leading 2.9 blocks per game. A 14-year-old and the second-youngest player in the tournament, Garuba became the first player from a lower age group to ever win MVP at the event. After recording 15 points, 11 rebounds and 10 blocks in the final against Lithuania, he joined Dario Šarić and Ricky Rubio as the only players in history with a triple-double in the final of the tournament.

In the summer of 2017, Garuba was unable to return to national team duty because he was recovering from a knee injury suffered earlier that year. At the 2018 FIBA U16 European Championship in Novi Sad, Serbia, he averaged 16.3 points and 12.3 rebounds per game and led Spain to a silver medal, earning a spot on the All-Star Five. Garuba helped Spain win a gold medal at the 2019 FIBA U18 European Championship in Volos, Greece, joining his teammate and MVP Santi Aldama on the All-Star Five after averaging 15.6 points, 12.9 rebounds and 2.1 blocks per game.

=== Senior national team ===
In 2021, Garuba played on Spain men's national basketball team at the 2020 Summer Olympics in Tokyo, Japan which were delayed by one year due to the ongoing COVID-19 pandemic. While there, he was drafted as the 23rd overall pick by the Houston Rockets during the 2021 NBA draft.

== Career statistics ==
Legend
GP	Games played	GS	Games started	MPG	Minutes per game
FG%	Field goal percentage	3P%	3-point field goal percentage	FT%	Free throw percentage
RPG	Rebounds per game	APG	Assists per game	SPG	Steals per game
BPG	Blocks per game	PPG	Points per game	**Bold**	Career high

=== NBA ===
==== Regular season ====
Year	Team	GP	GS	MPG	FG%	3P%	FT%	RPG	APG	SPG	BPG	PPG
2021–22	Houston	24	**2**	10.0	.432	.250	**.714**	3.5	.7	.4	**.5**	2.0
2022–23	Houston	**75**	1	**12.9**	**.486**	**.407**	.617	**4.1**	**.9**	**.6**	.4	**3.0**
2023–24	Golden State	6	0	3.0	.167	.000	.500	1.2	.2	.2	**.5**	.5
Career		105	3	11.7	.467	.363	.625	3.8	.8	.5	.4	2.6

== Personal life ==
Garuba's parents are from Benin City, Nigeria but left to escape conflict in their hometown. After initially moving to Brussels, they settled in Madrid in the 1990s without work permits. His father, Mustapha, works for manufacturing company Bimbo in Azuqueca de Henares, and his mother, Betty, works for the Azuqueca employment program. Garuba has one younger brother, Sediq (b. 2004), and a younger sister, Uki (b. 2010).
