= 2017–18 Euroleague Basketball Next Generation Tournament =

Adidas NGT
- Season: 2017–18
- Teams: 32

Regular season
- Season MVP: (Lithuania) Deividas Sirvydis (Lietuvos rytas)

Finals
- Champions: (Lithuania) Lietuvos rytas
- Runners-up: (Italy) Stella Azzurra

The 2017–18 Euroleague Basketball Next Generation Tournament, also called Adidas Next Generation Tournament by sponsorship reasons, is the 16th edition of the international junior basketball tournament organized by the Euroleague Basketball Company.

As in past years, 32 teams joined the first stage, which are played in four qualifying tournaments between January and February 2017.

== Qualifying tournaments ==
=== Torneig de Bàsquet Junior Ciutat de L'Hospitalet ===
The Torneig de Bàsquet Junior Ciutat de L'Hospitalet was played between 5 and 7 January 2018.

==== Group A ====
Pos	Team	Pld	W	L	GF	GA	GD	Qualification	JOV	HGC	VIR	HOS
1	(Spain) Divina Seguros Joventut	3	3	0	275	236	+39	Qualification to the final	—	84–71	—	—
2	(Spain) Herbalife Gran Canaria	3	2	1	215	222	−7		—	—	—	77–74
3	(Italy) Virtus Bologna	3	1	2	220	217	+3		83–94	64–67	—	—
4	(Spain) Torrons Vicens L'Hospitalet	3	0	3	212	247	−35		82–97	—	56–73	—

Source: Adidas NGT
Rules for classification: 1) points; 2) Head-to-head; 3) Points difference; 4) Points scored.

==== Group B ====
Pos	Team	Pld	W	L	GF	GA	GD	Qualification	FCB	ASV	UNI	PRO
1	(Spain) FC Barcelona Lassa	3	3	0	278	247	+31	Qualification to the final	—	87–81	87–82	104–84
2	(France) ASVEL Villeurbanne	3	1	2	235	230	+5		—	—	78–82	—
3	(Spain) Unicaja	3	1	2	227	236	−9		—	—	—	63–71
4	(Greece) Promitheas	3	1	2	216	243	−27		—	61–76	—	—

Source: Adidas NGT
Rules for classification: 1) points; 2) Head-to-head; 3) Points difference; 4) Points scored.

==== Classification games ====
Torrons Vicens L'Hospitalet (Spain)	92–85	(Greece) Promitheas

Virtus Bologna (Italy)	86–99	(Spain) Unicaja

Herbalife Gran Canaria (Spain)	81–90	(France) ASVEL Villeurbanne

==== Final ====
7 January 2018
19:00

Report

Divina Seguros Joventut (Spain)	77–74	(Spain) FC Barcelona Lassa
Scoring by quarter: 17–23, 18–13, 22–27, 20–11
Pts: Parrado 23; Rebs: Signes 13; Asts: Cuevas, Zagars 5 PIR: Parrado 28		Pts: Šamanic 27; Rebs: Šamanic 16; Asts: Žižić 7 PIR: Šamanic 33

Pavelló L'Hospitalet Nord, L'Hospitalet de Llobregat
Attendance: 568
Referees: Xavier Gotsens (ESP), Víctor Carreras (ESP)

=== Kaunas Tournament ===
The Kaunas Tournament was played between 19 and 21 January 2018.

==== Group A ====
Pos	Team	Pld	W	L	GF	GA	GD	Qualification	STE	ZAL	KHI	VEF
1	(Italy) Stella Azzurra	3	3	0	260	214	+46	Qualification to the final	—	88–75	—	79–56
2	(Lithuania) Žalgiris	3	2	1	265	216	+49		—	—	83–76	—
3	(Russia) Khimki	3	1	2	241	245	−4		83–93	—	—	82–69
4	(Latvia) VEF Rīga	3	0	3	177	268	−91		—	52–107	—	—

Source: Adidas NGT
Rules for classification: 1) points; 2) Head-to-head; 3) Points difference; 4) Points scored.

==== Group B ====
Pos	Team	Pld	W	L	GF	GA	GD	Qualification	LRY	CSK	PAR	FNB
1	(Lithuania) Lietuvos Rytas	3	3	0	246	169	+77	Qualification to the final	—	80–61	85–56	—
2	(Russia) CSKA Moscow	3	1	2	204	214	−10		—	—	73–77	70–57
3	(France) Centre Fédéral	3	1	2	194	220	−26		—	—	—	61–62
4	(Turkey) Fenerbahçe Doğuş	3	1	2	171	212	−41		52–81	—	—	—

Source: Adidas NGT
Rules for classification: 1) points; 2) Head-to-head; 3) Points difference; 4) Points scored.

==== Classification games ====
VEF Rīga (Latvia)	86–81	(Turkey) Fenerbahçe Doğuş

Khimki (Russia)	72–74	(France) Centre Fédéral

Žalgiris (Lithuania)	82–65	(Russia) CSKA Moscow

==== Final ====
21 January 2018
13:45

Report

Stella Azzurra (Italy)	55–76	(Lithuania) Lietuvos Rytas
Scoring by quarter: 14–25, 16–21, 10–23, 15–7
Pts: Eboua 14; Rebs: Eboua 11; Asts: Spagnolo, Donadio 2 PIR: Eboua 13		Pts: Blaževič 19; Rebs: Blaževič 11; Asts: Astrauskas, Jarumbauskas 3 PIR: Blaževič 32

Žalgiris Arena, Kaunas
Attendance: 469

=== Munich Tournament ===
The Munich Tournament was played between 9 and 11 February 2018.

==== Group A ====
Pos	Team	Pld	W	L	GF	GA	GD	Qualification	BAY	OLY	BRO	BET
1	(Germany) Bayern Munich	3	2	1	233	224	+9	Qualification to the final	—	74–66	90–91	69–67
2	(Greece) Olympiacos	3	2	1	235	225	+10		—	—	—	80–77
3	(Germany) Brose Bamberg	3	2	1	248	251	−3		—	74–89	—	83–72
4	(Spain) Real Betis Energía Plus	3	0	3	216	232	−16		—	—	—	—

Source: Adidas NGT
Rules for classification: 1) points; 2) Head-to-head; 3) Points difference; 4) Points scored.

==== Group B ====
Pos	Team	Pld	W	L	GF	GA	GD	Qualification	RMB	ALB	DAR	ULM
1	(Spain) Real Madrid	3	2	1	251	192	+59	Qualification to the final	—	98–56	89–63	—
2	(Germany) Alba Berlin	3	2	1	218	222	−4		—	—	74–58	88–66
3	(Turkey) Darüşşafaka	3	1	2	196	214	−18		—	—	—	—
4	(Germany) ratiopharm Ulm	3	1	2	190	227	−37		73–64	—	51–75	—

Source: Adidas NGT
Rules for classification: 1) points; 2) Head-to-head; 3) Points difference; 4) Points scored.

==== Classification games ====
Real Betis Energía Plus (Spain)	67–78	(Germany) ratiopharm Ulm

Brose Bamberg (Germany)	70–101	(Turkey) Darüşşafaka

Olympiacos (Greece)	57–83	(Germany) Alba Berlin

==== Final ====
11 February 2018
16:00

Boxscore

Bayern Munich (Germany)	57–77	(Spain) Real Madrid
Scoring by quarter: 11–21, 15–17, 14–22, 17–17
Pts: Binapfl 16; Rebs: Rudan, Grant 5 Asts: Dueh, Grant 2 PIR: Dueh 16		Pts: Nakić 23; Rebs: Garuba 11; Asts: Pantzar 7 PIR: Nakić 34

Audi Dome, Munich
Attendance: 2,100

=== Belgrade Tournament ===
The Belgrade Tournament was played between 23 and 25 February 2018.

==== Group A ====
Pos	Team	Pld	W	L	GF	GA	GD	Qualification	CZV	EFS	REY	SPA
1	(Serbia) Crvena zvezda mts	3	3	0	244	173	+71	Qualification to the final	—	87–70	—	71–53
2	(Turkey) Anadolu Efes	3	2	1	224	226	−2		—	—	75–70	—
3	(Italy) Umana Reyer Venezia	3	1	2	185	224	−39		50–86	—	—	65–63
4	(Bosnia and Herzegovina) Spars Ziraat Bank	3	0	3	185	215	−30		—	69–79	—	—

Source: Adidas NGT
Rules for classification: 1) points; 2) Head-to-head; 3) Points difference; 4) Points scored.

==== Group B ====
Pos	Team	Pld	W	L	GF	GA	GD	Qualification	PAR	MEG	GBA	CIB
1	(Serbia) Partizan NIS	3	3	0	278	232	+46	Qualification to the final	—	101–98	—	99–71
2	(Serbia) Mega Bemax	3	2	1	264	231	+33		—	—	—	99–71
3	(Czech Republic) GBA Prague	3	1	2	191	207	−16		63–78	59–67	—	—
4	(Croatia) Cibona	3	0	3	204	267	−63		—	—	62–69	—

Source: Adidas NGT
Rules for classification: 1) points; 2) Head-to-head; 3) Points difference; 4) Points scored.

==== Classification games ====
Spars Ziraat Bank (Bosnia and Herzegovina)	89–68	(Croatia) Cibona

Umana Reyer Venezia (Italy)	55–72	(Czech Republic) GBA Prague

Anadolu Efes (Turkey)	70–85	(Serbia) Mega Bemax

==== Final ====
25 February 2018
20:00

Boxscore

Crvena zvezda mts (Serbia)	90–59	(Serbia) Partizan NIS
Scoring by quarter: 18–15, 22–12, 25–18, 25–14
Pts: Paunović 26; Rebs: Paunović 8 Asts: Vasić 5 PIR: Paunović 33		Pts: Brkić 16; Rebs: Pecarski 11; Asts: Karapandžić 5 PIR: Brkić 16

Železnik Hall, Belgrade
Attendance: 2,000

== Final Tournament ==
The Final Tournament was played between 17 and 20 May 2018 in Belgrade, Serbia.

=== Teams ===
Title Holder	Qualified teams	Invited teams
(France) Centre Fédéral	(Spain) Divina Seguros Joventut (Lithuania) Lietuvos Rytas (Spain) Real Madrid (Serbia) Crvena zvezda mts	(Italy) Stella Azzurra (Germany) Bayern Munich (Serbia) Mega Bemax

=== Group A ===
Pos	Team	Pld	W	L	GF	GA	GD	Qualification	LRY	RMB	MEG	CFE
1	(Lithuania) Lietuvos Rytas	3	3	0	253	184	+69	Qualification to the final	—	—	103–65	80–53
2	(Spain) Real Madrid	3	2	1	226	189	+37		66–70	—	78–72	—
3	(Serbia) Mega Bemax	3	1	2	212	241	−29		—	—	—	75–60
4	(France) Centre Fédéral	3	0	3	160	237	−77		—	47–82	—	—

Source: Adidas NGT
Rules for classification: 1) points; 2) Head-to-head; 3) Points difference; 4) Points scored.

=== Group B ===
Pos	Team	Pld	W	L	GF	GA	GD	Qualification	STE	JOV	CZV	BAY
1	(Italy) Stella Azzurra	3	3	0	234	209	+25	Qualification to the final	—	—	—	67–63
2	(Spain) Divina Seguros Joventut	3	2	1	271	247	+24		82–92	—	—	—
3	(Serbia) Crvena zvezda mts	3	1	2	214	228	−14		64–75	78–90	—	—
4	(Germany) Bayern Munich	3	0	3	203	238	−35		—	77–99	63–72	—

Source: Adidas NGT
Rules for classification: 1) points; 2) Head-to-head; 3) Points difference; 4) Points scored.

=== Final ===
20 May 2018
10:00

Boxscore

Lietuvos Rytas (Lithuania)	76–71	(Italy) Stella Azzurra
Scoring by quarter: 21–16, 17–15, 19–19, 19–21
Pts: Blaževič 20; Rebs: Blaževič 11; Asts: three players 3 PIR: Sirvydis, Blaževič 21		Pts: Conti 22; Rebs: Eboua 13; Asts: Conti 5 PIR: Conti 27

Štark Arena, Belgrade
Attendance: 2,000
Referees: Marcin Kowalski (POL), Saulius Racys (SWE), Mykola Ambrosov (UKR)

=== Awards ===
MVP

- (Lithuania) Deividas Sirvydis (Lietuvos Rytas)

Rising star

- (Spain) Usman Garuba (Real Madrid)

All-tournament team

- (Philippines) Dalph Adem Panopio (Stella Azzurra)
- (Lithuania) Deividas Sirvydis (Lietuvos Rytas)
- (Croatia) Mario Nakić (Real Madrid)
- (Spain) Joel Parra (Divina Seguros Joventut)
- (Lithuania) Marek Blaževič (Lietuvos Rytas)
