= Aleksandar Langović =

Serbian basketball player (born 2001)

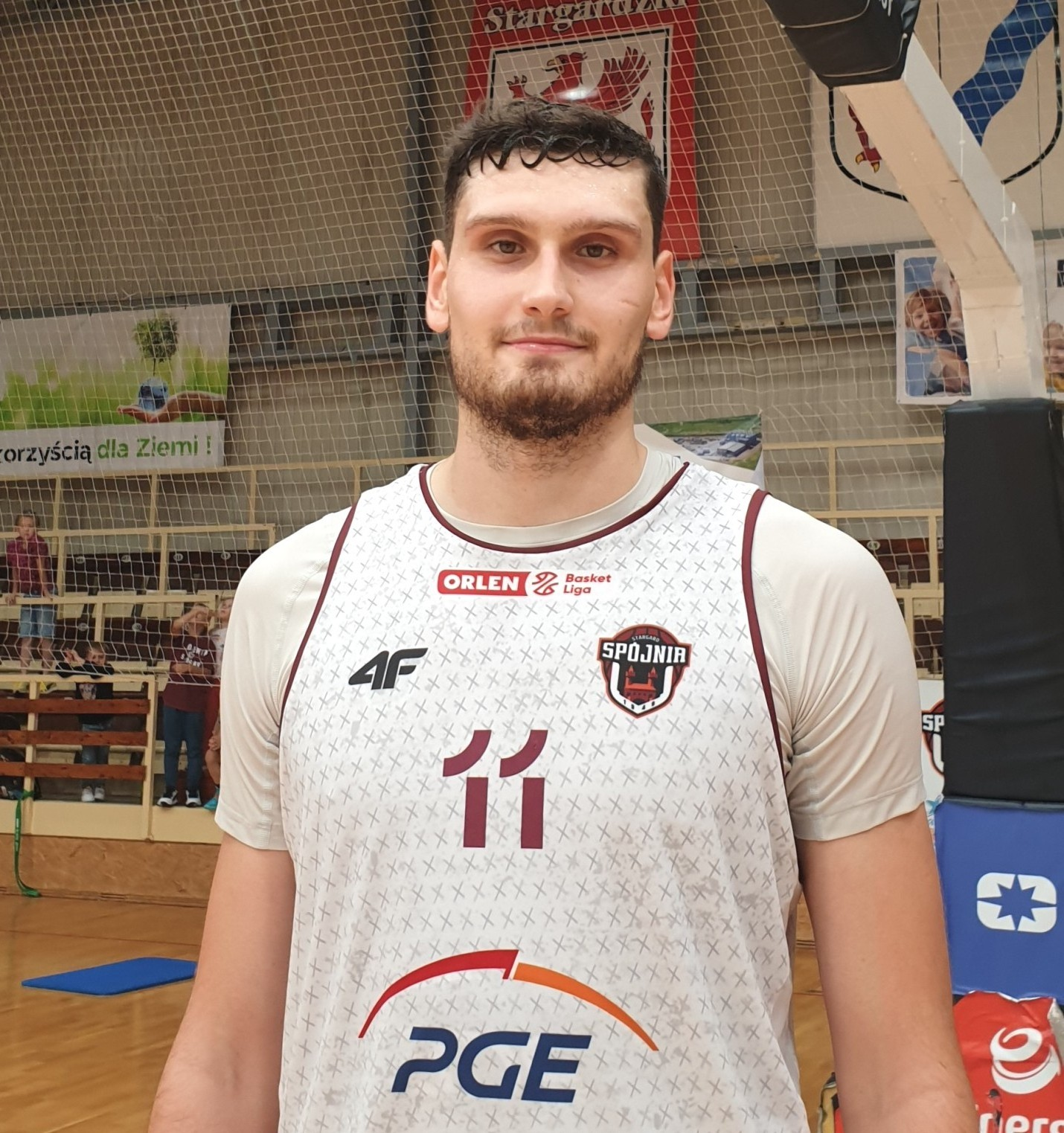

Free Agent
- Position: Power forward / small forward

Personal information
- Born: February 19, 2001 (age 25) Prijepolje, Serbia, FR Yugoslavia
- Listed height: 2.06 m (6 ft 9 in)
- Listed weight: 93 kg (205 lb)

Career information
- Playing career: 2018–present

Career history
- 2018–2023: Mega Basket
- 2018–2020: → OKK Beograd
- 2021–2022: → Podgorica
- 2022–2023: → Borac Banja Luka
- 2023–2025: Spójnia Stargard
- 2025–2026: Twarde Pierniki Toruń
Medals
Men's basketball
Representing Serbia
FIBA Europe Under-16 Championship
| Bronze medal – third place | 2017 Montenegro | U16 team |

Aleksandar Langović (Serbian Cyrillic: Александар Ланговић; born February 19, 2001) is a Serbian professional basketball player who last played for Twarde Pierniki Toruń of the Polish Basketball League (PLK).

== Early career ==
Langović joined the youth teams of Mega Basket in 2015. In August 2018, he participated at the Basketball Without Borders Europe camp in Belgrade, Serbia. Langović was selected to the all-tournament team for the 2018–19 season of the Next Generation Tournament. He played a key role in Mega reaching the championship game with 12.0 points, 5.3 rebounds and 2.3 assists per game.

== Professional career ==
Prior to the 2018–19 ABA League First Division season, Langović was promoted to the Mega Bemax first team. Also, he was added to OKK Beograd team for the 2018–19 Basketball League of Serbia season as a two-way affiliate player. On April 18, 2018, he made his OKK Beograd debut and the first career start in a road win against Dunav with 9 points, 6 rebounds, and 1 assist.

On 18 June 2021, Langović was loaned out to Podgorica.

On August 8, 2023, he signed with Spójnia Stargard of the Polish Basketball League (PLK).

On June 25, 2025, he signed with Twarde Pierniki Toruń of the Polish Basketball League (PLK).

== National team career ==
Langović was a member of the Serbian under-16 team that won the bronze medal at the 2017 FIBA Europe Under-16 Championship in Montenegro. Over seven tournament games, he averaged 10.3 points, 6.4 rebounds and 0.4 assists per game. He was a member of the Serbian under-17 team that participated at the 2018 FIBA Under-17 Basketball World Cup in Argentina. Over seven tournament games, he averaged 9.1 points, 7.0 rebounds and 0.6 assists per game.
