= Paul Eboua =

Cameroonian-Italian basketball player

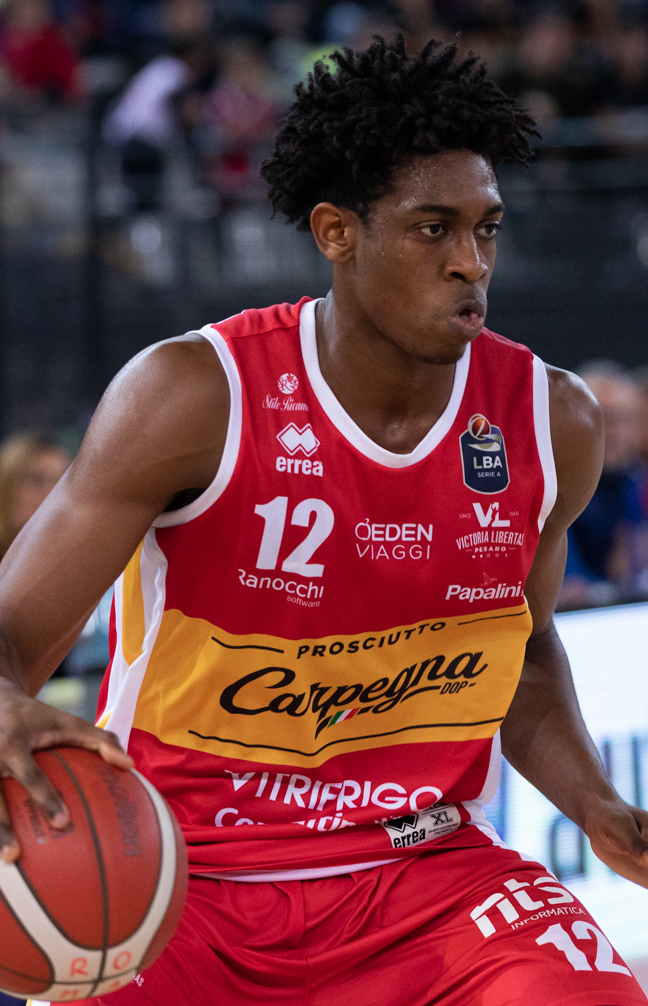
- Eboua with Victoria Libertas Pesaro in 2019

No. 00 – Derthona Basket
- Position: Power forward / small forward
- League: LBA; EuroCup

Personal information
- Born: 15 February 2000 (age 26) Yaoundé, Cameroon
- Listed height: 2.03 m (6 ft 8 in)
- Listed weight: 97 kg (214 lb)

Career information
- NBA draft: 2020: undrafted
- Playing career: 2015–present

Career history
- 2017–2020: Stella Azzurra Roma
- 2018–2019: →Roseto Sharks
- 2019–2020: →Victoria Libertas Pesaro
- 2021: Long Island Nets
- 2021: Victoria Libertas Pesaro
- 2021–2022: Brescia Leonessa
- 2022–2024: Vanoli Cremona
- 2024–2026: Olimpia Milano
- 2024: →Vanoli Cremona
- 2024–2025: →Trapani Shark
- 2026: →ASVEL Basket
- 2026–present: Derthona Basket
- Stats at NBA.com
- Stats at Basketball Reference

Paul Herman Eboua (born 15 February 2000) is a Cameroonian-Italian professional basketball player for Derthona Basket of the Italian Lega Basket Serie A (LBA) and the EuroCup. He played youth basketball for Stella Azzurra Roma.

== Early life and career ==
Eboua was born in Yaoundé, Cameroon but grew up in Douala. He started playing basketball at age 14 while attending Lycée de Makepe in Douala.

=== Stella Azzurra Roma (2015–2020) ===
In 2015, while playing at the University of Douala, he was noticed by Italian club Stella Azzurra Roma. That summer, Eboua moved to Rome, his family staying in Cameroon, to join Stella Azzurra, despite not speaking Italian or English and having only one year of basketball experience. His teammate Jordan Philippe Bayehe, who was also from Cameroon, helped him acclimate.

On 15 April 2016, Eboua played in the Jordan Brand Classic International Game in Brooklyn, New York. In January 2018, he averaged 14.8 points and 11 rebounds per game at the Kaunas tournament of the Adidas Next Generation Tournament (ANGT), an international junior competition, leading Stella Azzurra to the ANGT finals in Belgrade. In the following month, Eboua participated in a Basketball Without Borders camp in Los Angeles.

== Professional career ==
In the 2017–18 season, Eboua played for Stella Azzurra Roma in the Serie B Basket, averaging 3.3 points and 4.1 rebounds in 20 games.

=== Loan to Roseto Sharks (2018–2019) ===
On 7 October 2018, he was loaned to Roseto Sharks of the Serie A2 Basket, the second-tier Italian league. On 13 January 2019, he recorded season-highs of 18 points and nine rebounds a win over Pallacanestro Mantovana. In 35 games, Eboua averaged 5.3 points and 3.4 rebounds in 14.9 minutes per game. On 20 April 2019, he declared for the 2019 NBA draft. However, he withdrew from the draft in June.

=== Loan to Victoria Libertas Pesaro (2019–2020) ===
On 9 July 2019, Eboua was loaned to Victoria Libertas Pesaro of the Lega Basket Serie A (LBA), the top Italian league, for one season. On 9 September, he was sidelined for about one month after suffering a knee sprain in a car accident in Trieste. On 5 January 2020, Eboua scored a career-high 20 points in a loss to Pallacanestro Trieste. On 19 January, he recorded 15 points and 12 rebounds in a loss to Dinamo Sassari. Eboua finished the season averaging 7.4 points and 5.3 rebounds in 21.6 minutes per game. On 18 April, he parted ways with VL Pesaro to return to Stella Azzurra. One week later, Eboua declared for the 2020 NBA draft "with the full intent to stay in."

After going undrafted in the 2020 NBA draft, Eboua signed an Exhibit 10 contract with the Miami Heat on 25 November 2020. On 16 December, Eboua was waived by the Heat. On 18 December 2020, the Brooklyn Nets claimed him off waivers, and then waived him the next day.

=== Long Island Nets (2021) ===
On January 27, 2021, Eboua was included as an affiliate player in the roster for the Long Island Nets of the NBA G League.

=== Return to Victoria Libertas Pesaro (2021) ===
On March 21, 2021, Eboua signed a contract and returned to Victoria Libertas Pesaro of the Lega Basket Serie A.

=== Basket Brescia Leonessa (2021–2022) ===
On August 23, 2021, he signed with Basket Brescia Leonessa of the Italian Lega Basket Serie A (LBA).

=== Vanoli Cremona (2022–2024) ===
On June 29, 2022, he signed with Vanoli Cremona of the Italian Serie A2.

=== Olimpia Milano (2024–2026) ===
On June 14, 2024, he signed with Olimpia Milano of the Italian Lega Basket Serie A (LBA), then was loaned to Vanoli Cremona for the 2024–25 season. After a loan spell at Trapani Shark, he was loaned out to ASVEL Basket of the French LNB Élite and the EuroLeague in January 2026.

=== Derthona Basket (2026–present) ===
In 2026, Eboua parted ways with Olimpia Milano and signed a contract with Derthona Basket of the Lega Basket Serie A, joining the team to play in the EuroCup.
