= 2018–19 Euroleague Basketball Next Generation Tournament =

Adidas NGT
- Season: 2018–19
- Teams: 32

Regular season
- Season MVP: (Croatia) Mario Nakić (Real Madrid)

Finals
- Champions: (Spain) Real Madrid
- Runners-up: (Serbia) KK Mega Basket

The 2018–19 Euroleague Basketball Next Generation Tournament, also called Adidas Next Generation Tournament by sponsorship reasons, is the 17th edition of the international junior basketball tournament organized by the Euroleague Basketball Company.

As in past years, 32 teams joined the first stage, which are played in four qualifying tournaments between December 2018 and February 2019.

== Qualifying tournaments ==
=== Valencia ===
The Valencia Tournament was played between 28 and 30 December 2018.

==== Group A ====
Pos	Team	Pld	W	L	GF	GA	GD	Qualification
1	(Spain) Valencia	3	3	0	207	188	+19	Qualification to the final
2	(Germany) Porsche Ludwigsburg	3	2	1	196	167	+29	
3	(Spain) Barça Lassa	3	1	2	218	233	−15	
4	(Czech Republic) USK Future Stars Prague	3	0	3	178	211	−33	

Source: Adidas NGT
Rules for classification: 1) points; 2) Head-to-head; 3) Points difference; 4) Points scored.

==== Group B ====
Pos	Team	Pld	W	L	GF	GA	GD	Qualification
1	(Italy) Unipol Virtus Bologna	3	2	1	191	192	−1	Qualification to the final
2	(Spain) Divina Seguros Joventut	3	2	1	235	198	+37	
3	(Spain) Movistar Estudiantes	3	1	2	195	216	−21	
4	(France) ASVEL Villeurbanne	3	1	2	169	184	−15	

Source: Adidas NGT
Rules for classification: 1) points; 2) Head-to-head; 3) Points difference; 4) Points scored.

==== Day 1 ====
Group A	Valencia (Spain)	56–52	(Germany) Porsche Ludwigsburg

Group A	Barça Lassa (Spain)	78–71	(Czech Republic) USK Future Stars Prague

Group B	Movistar Estudiantes (Spain)	61–63	(Italy) Unipol Virtus Bologna

Group B	Divina Seguros Joventut (Spain)	67–53	(France) ASVEL Villeurbanne

==== Day 2 ====
Group A	USK Future Stars Prague (Czech Republic)	60–70	(Spain) Valencia

Group A	Porsche Ludwigsburg (Germany)	81–64	(Spain) Barça Lassa

Group B	Unipol Virtus Bologna (Italy)	76–73	(Spain) Divina Seguros Joventut

Group B	ASVEL Villeurbanne (France)	58–65	(Spain) Movistar Estudiantes

==== Day 3 ====
Group A	Porsche Ludwigsburg (Germany)	63–47	(Czech Republic) USK Future Stars Prague

Group A	Valencia (Spain)	81–76	(Spain) Barça Lassa

Group B	Unipol Virtus Bologna (Italy)	52–58	(France) ASVEL Villeurbanne

Group B	Divina Seguros Joventut (Spain)	95–69	(Spain) Movistar Estudiantes

==== Classification games ====
7th Place	USK Future Stars Prague (Czech Republic)	59–61	(France) ASVEL Villeurbanne

5th Place	Barça Lassa (Spain)	92–74	(Spain) Movistar Estudiantes

3rd Place	Porsche Ludwigsburg (Germany)	80–84	(Spain) Divina Seguros Joventut

==== Final ====
30 December 2018
18:30

Report

Valencia (Spain)	82–71	(Italy) Unipol Virtus Bologna
Scoring by quarter: 19-6, 18-23, 21-18, 24-24
Pts: Marc García 20; Rebs: Alfonso Jose Rives 9 Asts: Marc García, Alejandro Ortega 9 PIR: Marc García 30		Pts: Gabriele Procida, Matteo Nicoli 20; Rebs: Gabriele Procida 9 Asts: Deri Lorenzo 6 PIR: Gabriele Procida 23

Pavelló Municipal Font de San Lluís, Valencia
Attendance: 1,600

=== Munich Tournament ===
The Munich Tournament was played between 25 and 27 January 2019.

==== Group A ====
Pos	Team	Pld	W	L	GF	GA	GD	Qualification
1	(Israel) Maccabi Teddy Tel Aviv	3	3	0	246	218	+28	Qualification to the final
2	(Germany) Farport Skyliners Frankfurt	3	2	1	187	183	+4	
3	(Germany) Bayern Munich	3	1	2	198	205	−7	
4	(Serbia) Partizan NIS	3	0	3	199	224	−25	

Source: Adidas NGT
Rules for classification: 1) points; 2) Head-to-head; 3) Points difference; 4) Points scored.

==== Group B ====
Pos	Team	Pld	W	L	GF	GA	GD	Qualification
1	(Spain) Real Madrid	3	3	0	298	174	+124	Qualification to the final
2	(Germany) Ratiopharm Ulm	3	2	1	257	228	+29	
3	(Germany) Alba Berlin	3	1	2	220	283	−63	
4	(Greece) Panathinaikos OPAP Athens	3	0	3	179	269	−90	

Source: Adidas NGT
Rules for classification: 1) points; 2) Head-to-head; 3) Points difference; 4) Points scored.

==== Day 1 ====
Group A	Maccabi Teddy Tel Aviv (Israel)	90–83	(Serbia) Partizan NIS

Group A	Bayern Munich (Germany)	55–61	(Germany) Farport Skyliners Frankfurt

Group B	Alba Berlin (Germany)	82–78	(Greece) Panathinaikos OPAP Athens

Group B	Real Madrid (Spain)	89–74	(Germany) Ratiopharm Ulm

==== Day 2 ====
Group A	Farport Skyliners Frankfurt (Germany)	58–73	(Israel) Maccabi Teddy Tel Aviv

Group A	Partizan NIS (Serbia)	61–66	(Germany) Bayern Munich

Group B	Alba Berlin (Germany)	78–94	(Germany) Ratiopharm Ulm

Group B	Real Madrid (Spain)	98–40	(Greece) Panathinaikos OPAP Athens

==== Day 3 ====
Group A	Partizan NIS (Serbia)	55–68	(Germany) Farport Skyliners Frankfurt

Group A	Bayern Munich (Germany)	77–83	(Israel) Maccabi Teddy Tel Aviv

Group B	Panathinaikos OPAP Athens (Greece)	61–89	(Germany) Ratiopharm Ulm

Group B	Alba Berlin (Germany)	60–111	(Spain) Real Madrid

==== Classification games ====
7th Place	Partizan NIS (Serbia)	77–62	(Greece) Panathinaikos OPAP Athens

5th Place	Bayern Munich (Germany)	94–62	(Germany) Alba Berlin

3rd Place	Farport Skyliners Frankfurt (Germany)	86–61	(Germany) Ratiopharm Ulm

==== Final ====
27 January 2019
16:00

Boxscore

Maccabi Teddy Tel Aviv (Israel)	58–96	(Spain) Real Madrid
Scoring by quarter: 17-18, 15-25, 16-27, 10-26
Pts: Avdija 18; Rebs: Avdija 11; Asts: Avdija 6 PIR: Dori Sahar 18		Pts: Garuba 22; Rebs: Garuba 9 Asts: Ziga Samar 8 PIR: Garuba 30

Audi Dome, Munich
Attendance: 600

=== Kaunas Tournament ===
The Kaunas Tournament was played between 8 and 10 February 2019.

==== Group A ====
Pos	Team	Pld	W	L	GF	GA	GD	Qualification
1	(Lithuania) Žalgiris Kaunas	3	3	0	240	191	+49	Qualification to the final
2	(France) CFBB Paris	3	2	1	217	219	−2	
3	(Spain) Torrons Vicens L'Hospitalet	3	1	2	238	254	−16	
4	(Russia) Lokomotiv Kuban Krasnodar	3	0	3	231	262	−31	

Source: Adidas NGT
Rules for classification: 1) points; 2) Head-to-head; 3) Points difference; 4) Points scored.

==== Group B ====
Pos	Team	Pld	W	L	GF	GA	GD	Qualification
1	(Lithuania) Lietuvos Rytas	3	2	1	259	214	+45	Qualification to the final
2	(Italy) Stella Azzurra Rome	3	2	1	229	223	+6	
3	(Russia) CSKA Moscow	3	2	1	243	208	+35	
4	(Denmark) DAB Copenhagen	3	0	3	191	277	−86	

Source: Adidas NGT
Rules for classification: 1) points; 2) Head-to-head; 3) Points difference; 4) Points scored.

==== Day 1 ====
Group A	Lokomotiv Kuban Krasnodar (Russia)	63–84	(Lithuania) Žalgiris Kaunas

Group A	Torrons Vicens L'Hospitalet (Spain)	72–77	(France) CFBB Paris

Group B	DAB Copenhagen (Denmark)	66–92	(Lithuania) Lietuvos Rytas

Group B	CSKA Moscow (Russia)	71–68	(Italy) Stella Azzurra Rome

==== Day 2 ====
Group A	CFBB Paris (France)	82–75	(Russia) Lokomotiv Kuban Krasnodar

Group A	Žalgiris Kaunas (Lithuania)	84–70	(Spain) Torrons Vicens L'Hospitalet

Group B	Lietuvos Rytas (Lithuania)	85–64	(Russia) CSKA Moscow

Group B	DAB Copenhagen (Denmark)	70–77	(Italy) Stella Azzurra Rome

==== Day 3 ====
Group A	Lokomotiv Kuban Krasnodar (Russia)	93–96	(Spain) Torrons Vicens L'Hospitalet

Group A	CFBB Paris (France)	58–72	(Lithuania) Žalgiris Kaunas

Group B	CSKA Moscow (Russia)	108–55	(Denmark) DAB Copenhagen

Group B	Stella Azzurra Rome (Italy)	84–82	(Lithuania) Lietuvos Rytas

==== Classification games ====
7th Place	Lokomotiv Kuban Krasnodar (Russia)	94–84	(Denmark) DAB Copenhagen

5th Place	Torrons Vicens L'Hospitalet (Spain)	62–64	(Russia) CSKA Moscow

3rd Place	CFBB Paris (France)	67–49	(Italy) Stella Azzurra

==== Final ====
20 February 2019
14:15

Report

Žalgiris Kaunas (Lithuania)	92–79	(Lithuania) Lietuvos Rytas
Scoring by quarter: 20-12, 21-20, 27-22, 24-25
Pts: Kriisa 27; Rebs: Dovydas Rimkus, Gabrielius Celka 6 Asts: Laurynas Vaištaras 5 PIR: Kriisa 32		Pts: Daniel Baslyk 23; Rebs: Adas Šimonis, Ąžuolas Tubelis 7 Asts: Augustas Marčiulionis 4 PIR: Ąžuolas Tubelis 31

Žalgiris Arena, Kaunas
Attendance: 1,300

=== Belgrade Tournament ===
The Belgrade Tournament was played between 22 and 24 February 2019.

==== Group A ====
Pos	Team	Pld	W	L	GF	GA	GD	Qualification
1	(Serbia) Crvena zvezda mts	3	3	0	301	215	+86	Qualification to the final
2	(Greece) Olympiacos	3	2	1	262	249	+13	
3	(Italy) Umana Reyer Venezia	3	1	2	225	263	−38	
4	(Croatia) Cedevita	3	0	3	214	275	−61	

Source: Adidas NGT
Rules for classification: 1) points; 2) Head-to-head; 3) Points difference; 4) Points scored.

==== Group B ====
Pos	Team	Pld	W	L	GF	GA	GD	Qualification
1	(Serbia) Mega Bemax	3	3	0	241	180	+61	Qualification to the final
2	(Slovenia) Petrol Olimpija	3	2	1	224	229	−5	
3	(Bosnia and Herzegovina) OKK Spars Sarajevo	3	1	2	204	236	−32	
4	(Turkey) Fenerbahçe Beko Istanbul	3	0	3	215	239	−24	

Source: Adidas NGT
Rules for classification: 1) points; 2) Head-to-head; 3) Points difference; 4) Points scored.

==== Day 1 ====
Group A	Crvena zvezda mts (Serbia)	99–87	(Greece) Olympiacos

Group A	Cedevita (Croatia)	76–85	(Italy) Umana Reyer Venezia

Group B	Fenerbahçe Beko Istanbul (Turkey)	72–73	(Bosnia and Herzegovina) OKK Spars Sarajevo

Group B	Mega Bemax (Serbia)	74–61	(Slovenia) Petrol Olimpija

==== Day 2 ====
Group A	Umana Reyer Venezia (Italy)	69–100	(Serbia) Crvena zvezda mts

Group A	Olympiacos (Greece)	88–79	(Croatia) Cedevita

Group B	Mega Bemax (Serbia)	81–64	(Turkey) Fenerbahçe Beko Istanbul

Group B	Petrol Olimpija (Slovenia)	78–76	(Bosnia and Herzegovina) OKK Spars Sarajevo

==== Day 3 ====
Group A	Olympiacos (Greece)	87–71	(Italy) Umana Reyer Venezia

Group A	Crvena zvezda mts (Serbia)	102–59	(Croatia) Cedevita

Group B	OKK Spars Sarajevo (Bosnia and Herzegovina)	55–86	(Serbia) Mega Bemax

Group B	Fenerbahçe Beko Istanbul (Turkey)	79–85	(Slovenia) Petrol Olimpija

==== Classification games ====
7th Place	Cedevita (Croatia)	84–89	(Turkey) Fenerbahçe Beko Istanbul

5th Place	Umana Reyer Venezia (Italy)	81–83	(Bosnia and Herzegovina) OKK Spars Sarajevo

3rd Place	Olympiacos (Greece)	87–86	(Slovenia) Petrol Olimpija

==== Final ====
24 February 2019
19:00

Boxscore

Crvena zvezda mts (Serbia)	63–73	(Serbia) Mega Bemax
Scoring by quarter: 17-22, 14-16, 19-15, 13-20
Pts: Vukašin Mašić, Lazar Živanović 12; Rebs: Marko Pavicevic 6 Asts: Vukašin Mašić 6 PIR: Vukašin Mašić 13		Pts: Langović 18; Rebs: Langović 11; Asts: Marko Kljajević 4 PIR: Langović 30

Železnik Hall, Belgrade
Attendance: 1,500

== Final Tournament ==
The Final Tournament was played between 16 and 19 May 2019 in Vitoria-Gasteiz, Spain.

=== Teams ===
Title Holder	Qualified teams	Invited teams
(Lithuania) Lietuvos Rytas	(Spain) Valencia (Spain) Real Madrid (Lithuania) Žalgiris Kaunas (Serbia) Mega Bemax	(Germany) Bayern Munich (Israel) Maccabi Teddy Tel Aviv (Serbia) Crvena zvezda mts

=== Group A ===
Pos	Team	Pld	W	L	GF	GA	GD	Qualification
1	(Serbia) Mega Bemax	3	3	0	242	204	+38	Qualification to the final
2	(Germany) Bayern Munich	3	2	1	244	241	+3	
3	(Israel) Maccabi Teddy Tel Aviv	3	1	2	211	235	−24	
4	(Lithuania) Žalgiris Kaunas	3	0	3	214	231	−17	

Source: Adidas NGT
Rules for classification: 1) points; 2) Head-to-head; 3) Points difference; 4) Points scored.

=== Group B ===
Pos	Team	Pld	W	L	GF	GA	GD	Qualification
1	(Spain) Real Madrid	3	3	0	275	176	+99	Qualification to the final
2	(Serbia) Crvena zvezda mts	3	2	1	211	218	−7	
3	(Spain) Valencia	3	1	2	228	268	−40	
4	(Lithuania) Lietuvos Rytas	3	0	3	229	281	−52	

Source: Adidas NGT
Rules for classification: 1) points; 2) Head-to-head; 3) Points difference; 4) Points scored.

==== Day 1 ====
Group A	Maccabi Teddy Tel Aviv (Israel)	69–80	(Serbia) Mega Bemax

Group A	Bayern Munich (Germany)	85–83	(Lithuania) Žalgiris Kaunas

Group B	Valencia (Spain)	54–97	(Spain) Real Madrid

Group B	Lietuvos Rytas (Lithuania)	66–81	(Serbia) Crvena zvezda mts

==== Day 2 ====
Group A	Mega Bemax (Serbia)	87–74	(Germany) Bayern Munich

Group A	Žalgiris Kaunas (Lithuania)	70–71	(Israel) Maccabi Teddy Tel Aviv

Group B	Real Madrid (Spain)	98–72	(Lithuania) Lietuvos Rytas

Group B	Crvena zvezda mts (Serbia)	80–72	(Spain) Valencia

==== Day 3 ====
Group A	Bayern Munich (Germany)	85–71	(Israel) Maccabi Teddy Tel Aviv

Group A	Mega Bemax (Serbia)	75–61	(Lithuania) Žalgiris Kaunas

Group B	Real Madrid (Spain)	80–50	(Serbia) Crvena zvezda mts

Group B	Lietuvos Rytas (Lithuania)	91–102	(Spain) Valencia

=== Final ===
19 May 2019
10:00

Boxscore

Mega Bemax (Serbia)	76–95	(Spain) Real Madrid
Scoring by quarter: 20–20, 13–30, 22–22, 21–23
Pts: three players 12; Rebs: Marković 10; Asts: Andrić 4 PIR: Marković 16		Pts: Nakić 33; Rebs: Sylla 14; Asts: Queeley, Sylla 6 PIR: Nakić 41

Fernando Buesa Arena, Vitoria-Gasteiz
Attendance: 700
Referees: Ingus Baumanis (LAT), Michele Rossi (ITA), Sinan İşgüder (TUR)

=== Awards ===
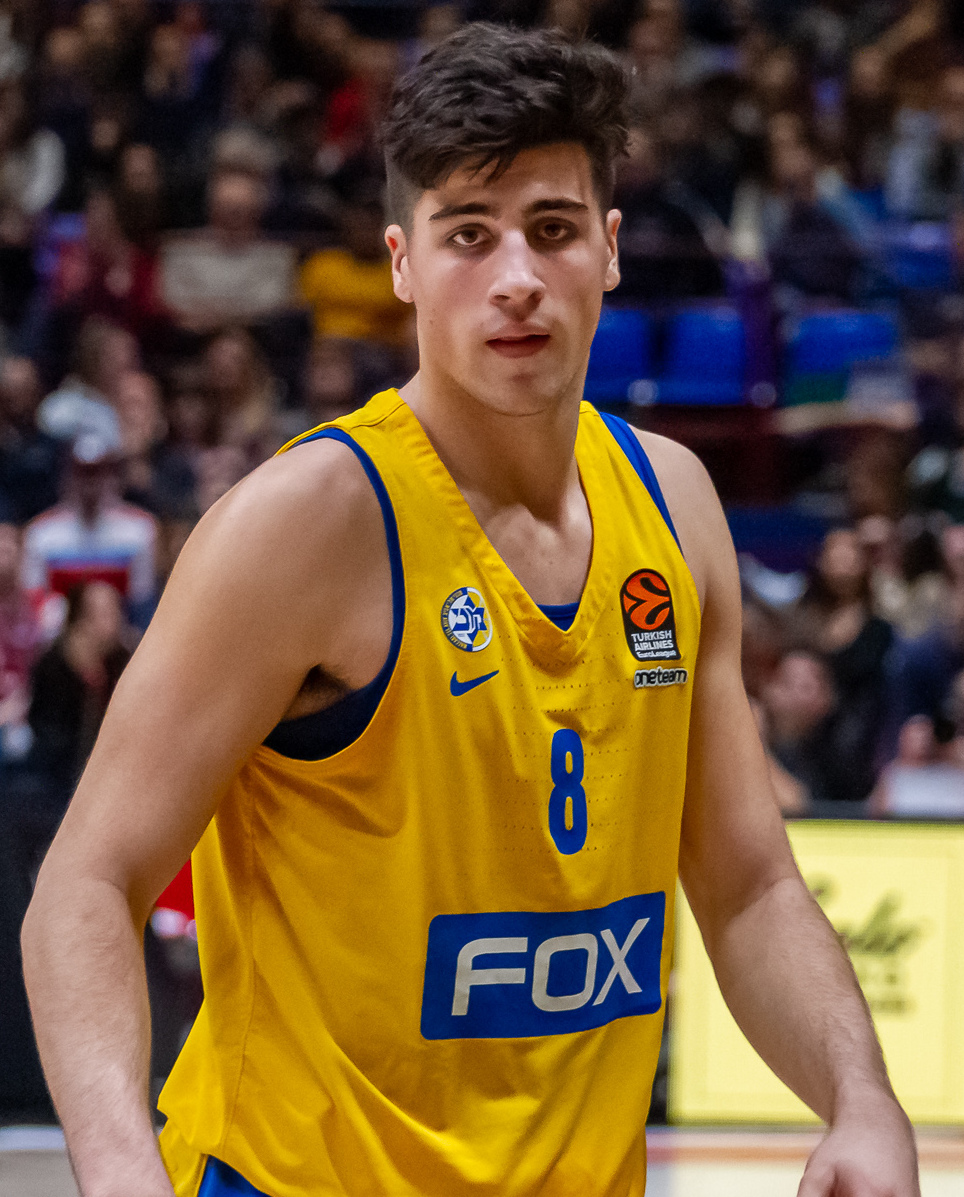
Deni Avdija

MVP

- (Croatia) Mario Nakić (Real Madrid)

Rising star

- (Lithuania) Paulius Murauskas (Žalgiris Kaunas)

All-Tournament Team

- (Croatia) Mario Nakić (Real Madrid)
- (Spain) Usman Garuba (Real Madrid)
- (Israel) Deni Avdija (Maccabi Teddy Tel Aviv)
- (Serbia) Aleksandar Langović (Mega Bemax)
- (Croatia) Matej Rudan (Bayern Munich)
