= 2019–20 Real Madrid Baloncesto season =

Real Madrid
2019–20 season
- President: Florentino Pérez
- Head coach: Pablo Laso
- Arena: WiZink Center
- Liga ACB: 2nd (Note: Regular season was cancelled due to the COVID-19 pandemic.)
- Playoffs: Group stage
- EuroLeague: 2nd (Note: Season was cancelled due to the COVID-19 pandemic.)
- Copa del Rey: Winners
- Supercopa: Winners
- Highest home attendance: Liga ACB: 9,852; Real Madrid 94–95 Baskonia (19 January 2020) EuroLeague: 12,729; Real Madrid 86–76 Barcelona (14 November 2019)
- Lowest home attendance: Liga ACB: 6,922; Real Madrid 92–76 Gran Canaria (24 November 2019) EuroLeague: 7,019; Real Madrid 87–78 ASVEL (5 March 2020)
- Average home attendance: Liga ACB: 8,086; EuroLeague: 9,649
- Biggest win: Real Madrid 91–60 Andorra (22 December 2019)
- Biggest defeat: Barça 83–63 Real Madrid (29 December 2019)
Home	Away

The 2019–20 season was Real Madrid's 89th in existence, their 64th consecutive season in the top flight of Spanish basketball and 13th consecutive season in the EuroLeague. This was also the ninth season in a row under head coach Pablo Laso.

Times up to 26 October 2019 and from 29 March 2020 were CEST (UTC+2). Times from 27 October 2019 to 28 March 2020 were CET (UTC+1).

== Players ==
=== Squad information ===
Note: Flags indicate national team eligibility at FIBA-sanctioned events. Players may hold other non-FIBA nationalities not displayed.

Real Madrid roster
Players
Coaches

Pos.	No.	Nat.	Name	Ht.	Age
PG	7	(Argentina)	Campazzo, Facundo	1.81 m (5 ft 11 in)	29 – 23 March 1991
SG	20	(Azerbaijan)	Carroll, Jaycee	1.88 m (6 ft 2 in)	37 – 16 April 1983
SG	1	(France)	Causeur, Fabien	1.95 m (6 ft 5 in)	33 – 16 June 1987
SF	14	(Argentina)	Deck, Gabriel	1.98 m (6 ft 6 in)	25 – 8 February 1995
G/F	5	(Spain)	Fernández, Rudy	1.96 m (6 ft 5 in)	35 – 4 April 1985
F/C	16	(Spain)	Garuba, Usman	2.03 m (6 ft 8 in)	18 – 9 March 2002
PG	8	(Argentina)	Laprovíttola, Nicolás	1.90 m (6 ft 3 in)	30 – 31 January 1990
G	23	(Spain)	Llull, Sergio	1.88 m (6 ft 2 in)	32 – 15 November 1987
C	50	(Tunisia)	Mejri, Salah	2.18 m (7 ft 2 in)	34 – 15 June 1986
C	25	(United States)	Mickey, Jordan	2.03 m (6 ft 8 in)	25 – 9 July 1994
SF	17	(Serbia)	Nakić, Mario	2.02 m (6 ft 8 in)	19 – 14 June 2001
PF	3	(Slovenia)	Randolph, Anthony	2.11 m (6 ft 11 in)	30 – 15 July 1989
F/C	9	(Spain)	Reyes, Felipe (C)	2.04 m (6 ft 8 in)	40 – 16 March 1980
C	22	(Cape Verde)	Tavares, Edy	2.21 m (7 ft 3 in)	28 – 22 March 1992
G/F	44	(Sweden)	Taylor, Jeffery	2.01 m (6 ft 7 in)	31 – 23 May 1989
PF	33	(United States)	Thompkins, Trey	2.08 m (6 ft 10 in)	30 – 29 May 1990

Head coach

- (Spain) Pablo Laso

Legend

- (C) Team captain
- Injured

- Roster

=== Depth chart ===
Pos.	Starting 5	Bench 1	Bench 2	Bench 3
C	Edy Tavares	Jordan Mickey	Salah Mejri
PF	Anthony Randolph	Trey Thompkins	Usman Garuba	Felipe Reyes
SF	Gabriel Deck	Rudy Fernández	Mario Nakić
SG	Jeffery Taylor	Fabien Causeur	Jaycee Carroll
PG	Facundo Campazzo	Sergio Llull	Nicolás Laprovíttola

Colours: Blue = homegrown player; Red = non–FIBA Europe player

=== Transactions ===
==== In ====
No.	Pos.	Nat.	Name	Age	Moving from		Type	Ends	Date	Source
	SF	(Montenegro)	Dino Radončić	20	UCAM Murcia	(Spain)	Loan return	June 2020	1 July 2019	
	C	(Spain)	Sebas Saiz	24	Iberostar Tenerife	(Spain)	Loan return	June 2019	1 July 2019	
	C	(Brazil)	Felipe dos Anjos	21	Club Melilla Baloncesto	(Spain)	Loan return	Undisclosed	1 July 2019	
8	PG	(Argentina)	Nicolás Laprovíttola	29	Club Joventut Badalona	(Spain)	Transfer	June 2021	9 July 2019	
25	C	(United States)	Jordan Mickey	25	Khimki	(Russia)	End of contract	June 2021	15 July 2019	
	PG	(Spain)	Carlos Alocén	18	Casademont Zaragoza	(Spain)	Transfer	June 2024	24 July 2019	
50	C	(Tunisia)	Salah Mejri	33	Liaoning Flying Leopards	(China)	Transfer	June 2020	10 October 2019	

==== Out ====
No.	Pos.	Nat.	Name	Age	Moving to		Type	Date	Source
32	C	(Serbia)	Ognjen Kuzmić	29	Crvena zvezda mts	(Serbia)	End of contract	4 July 2019	
16	SF	(Spain)	Santiago Yusta	22	Iberostar Tenerife	(Spain)	End of contract	9 July 2019	
	SF	(Montenegro)	Dino Radončić	20	UCAM Murcia	(Spain)	Transfer	25 July 2019	
14	C	(Mexico)	Gustavo Ayón	34	Zenit Saint Petersburg	(Russia)	End of contract	26 July 2019	
	C	(Spain)	Sebas Saiz	25	Sun Rockers Shibuya	(Japan)	End of contract	1 August 2019	
25	SG	(Slovenia)	Klemen Prepelič	26	Club Joventut Badalona	(Spain)	Loan	6 August 2019	
	PG	(Spain)	Carlos Alocén	18	Casademont Zaragoza	(Spain)	Loan	24 July 2019	

== Pre-season and friendlies ==
=== Torneo Costa del Sol ===
6 September 2019	Real Madrid	80–77	Zenit Saint Petersburg	Frigiliana
20:00	Scoring by quarter: 20–19, 19–24, 23–15, 18–19
	Pts: Carroll 20; Rebs: three players 5 Asts: Nakić 3 PIR: Carroll, Garuba 16	Boxscore	Pts: Trushkin 19; Rebs: Iverson, Thomas 6 Asts: Ayón, Hollins 4 PIR: Trushkin 17	Arena: Villa de Frigiliana; Referees: Daniel Hierrezuelo, José Ramón García, Alberto Sánchez

7 September 2019	Unicaja	69–76	Real Madrid	Nerja
20:00	Scoring by quarter: 16–24, 12–19, 19–18, 22–15
	Pts: Avramović 20	Boxscore	Pts: Carroll 18	Arena: Municipal; Referees: Benjamín Jiménez, José Ramón García, Alberto Sánchez

=== Torneo Liberbank Ciudad de Oviedo ===
11 September 2019	Liberbank Oviedo Baloncesto	68–73	Real Madrid	Oviedo
21:00	Scoring by quarter: 15–22, 22–18, 13–22, 18–11
	Pts: Reyes 17	Boxscore	Pts: Mickey 16	Arena: Polideportivo de Pumarín; Attendance: 1,200; Referees: Benjamín Jiménez, Vicente Martínez, Yasmina Alcaraz

12 September 2019	Real Madrid	72–66	Kirolbet Baskonia	Oviedo
21:00	Scoring by quarter: 9–23, 23–11, 14–21, 26–11
	Pts: Carroll 23; Rebs: Causeur, Mickey 6 Asts: Causeur 3 PIR: Carroll 24	Boxscore	Pts: three players 12; Rebs: Fall 9 Asts: Granger 4 PIR: Fall 17	Arena: Polideportivo de Pumarín; Attendance: 1,300; Referees: Emilio Pérez Pizarro, Vicente Martínez, David Sánchez

=== Trofeo Ibercaja Ciudad de Zaragoza ===
14 September 2019	Casademont Zaragoza	72–63	Real Madrid	Zaragoza
19:30	Scoring by quarter: 17–20, 19–9, 14–21, 22–13
	Pts: Radović 13; Rebs: Hlinason, Vázquez 7 Asts: Seeley 5 PIR: Radović 12	Boxscore	Pts: Carroll 16; Rebs: Randolph 7 Asts: three players 2 PIR: Randolph 16	Arena: Pabellón Príncipe Felipe; Attendance: 6,453; Referees: Carlos Peruga, Javier Torres, Arnau Padrós

== Competitions ==
=== Overview ===
Competition	First match	Last match	Starting round	Final position	Record							
Competition	First match	Last match	Starting round	Final position	Pld	W	D	L	PF	PA	PD	Win %
Liga ACB	27 September 2019	26 June 2020	Round 1	5th	28	21	0	7	2,429	2,187	+242	75.00
EuroLeague	3 October 2019	5 March 2020	Round 1	2nd	28	22	0	6	2,371	2,165	+206	78.57
Copa del Rey	13 February 2020	16 February 2020	Quarterfinals	Winners	3	3	0	0	279	219	+60	100.00
Supercopa de España	21 September 2019	22 September 2019	Semifinals	Winners	2	2	0	0	205	140	+65	100.00
Total					61	48	0	13	5,284	4,711	+573	78.69

Source: Competitions

=== Liga ACB ===
==== League table ====
Pos	Team	Pld	W	L	PF	PA	PD	Qualification
1	Barça	23	19	4	2041	1847	+194	Qualification to playoffs
2	Real Madrid	23	18	5	1988	1758	+230	Qualification to playoffs
3	Casademont Zaragoza	23	16	7	1911	1810	+101	Qualification to playoffs
4	Iberostar Tenerife	22	14	8	1802	1736	+66	Qualification to playoffs
5	RETAbet Bilbao Basket	23	14	9	1906	1908	−2	Qualification to playoffs

Source: ACB

==== Results summary ====
Overall						Home					Away				
Pld	W	L	PF	PA	PD	W	L	PF	PA	PD	W	L	PF	PA	PD
23	18	5	1988	1758	+230	10	2	1096	905	+191	8	3	892	853	+39

Source: Competitive matches

==== Results by round ====
Round	1	2	3	4	5	6	7	8	9	10	11	12	13	14	15	16	17	18	19	20	21	22	23	24	25	26	27	28	29	30	31	32	33	34
Ground	A	H	A	H	A	H	A	H	A	H	A	H	A	H	A	H	A	H	A	H	H	A	H	A	H	A	H	A	A	H	A	H	H	A
Result	W	W	W	W	W	W	W	W	L	W	L	W	W	W	L	W	W	L	W	L	W	W	W	V	V	V	V	V	V	V	V	V	V	V
Position	3	1	1	1	1	1	1	1	1	1	1	1	1	1	1	1	1	1	1	2	2	2	2											

Source: Competitive matches
A = Away; H = Home; W = Win; L = Loss; V = Void

==== Matches ====
27 September 2019 1	Club Joventut Badalona	69–88	Real Madrid	Badalona
21:30	Scoring by quarter: 22–23, 14–18, 13–24, 20–23
	Pts: Prepelič 19; Rebs: Omić 11; Asts: Prepelič, Zisis 5 PIR: Harangody 18	Boxscore	Pts: Carroll 17; Rebs: Tavares 7 Asts: three players 3 PIR: Carroll 15	Arena: Palau Municipal d'Esports; Attendance: 7,024; Referees: Benjamín Jiménez Trujillo, Martín Caballero, Alberto Baena

29 September 2019 2	Real Madrid	97–69	UCAM Murcia	Madrid
20:00	Scoring by quarter: 30–13, 19–12, 19–18, 29–26
	Pts: Llull 17; Rebs: Garuba 10; Asts: Causeur 7 PIR: Garuba 24	Boxscore	Pts: Cățe 13; Rebs: Tumba 8 Asts: four players 2 PIR: Cățe 14	Arena: WiZink Center; Attendance: 7,279; Referees: José Antonio Martín Bertrán, Jorge Martínez, Vicente Martínez

5 October 2019 3	Iberostar Tenerife	71–76	Real Madrid	San Cristóbal de La Laguna
20:30	Scoring by quarter: 11–18, 23–20, 20–14, 17–24
	Pts: Shermadini 20; Rebs: Atkins, Shermadini 7 Asts: Huertas 5 PIR: Shermadini 26	Boxscore	Pts: Llull 19; Rebs: Tavares 10; Asts: three players 3 PIR: Llull 17	Arena: Santiago Martín; Attendance: 5,211; Referees: Carlos Peruga, Vicente Bultó, Roberto Lucas

13 October 2019 4	Real Madrid	89–64	Montakit Fuenlabrada	Madrid
12:30	Scoring by quarter: 22–14, 26–17, 21–12, 20–21
	Pts: Carroll 15; Rebs: Tavares 12; Asts: Llull 5 PIR: Deck 23	Boxscore	Pts: Gillet 14; Rebs: Ehigiator, Eyenga 6 Asts: Rowland 4 PIR: Gillet, Rowland 13	Arena: WiZink Center; Attendance: 8,031; Referees: Carlos Cortés, Rafael Serrano, Joaquín García

19 October 2019 5	Monbus Obradoiro	76–83	Real Madrid	Santiago de Compostela
20:30	Scoring by quarter: 23–19, 14–25, 20–21, 19–18
	Pts: Kravić 19; Rebs: Kravić 7 Asts: Muñoz 3 PIR: Kravić 25	Boxscore	Pts: Campazzo, Laprovíttola 14; Rebs: Garuba 13; Asts: Causeur 3 PIR: Campazzo 12	Arena: Multiusos Fontes do Sar; Attendance: 5,824; Referees: Antonio Conde, Jordi Aliaga, Yasmina Alcaraz

27 October 2019 6	Real Madrid	94–74	Baxi Manresa	Madrid
12:30	Scoring by quarter: 27–28, 28–16, 21–15, 18–15
	Pts: Deck 18; Rebs: three players 5 Asts: Laprovíttola 7 PIR: Tavares 24	Boxscore	Pts: Kravish, Sakho 12; Rebs: Kravish 6 Asts: Pérez 6 PIR: Sakho 16	Arena: WiZink Center; Attendance: 7,595; Referees: Carlos Peruga, Raúl Zamorano, Cristóbal Sánchez

3 November 2019 7	Kirolbet Baskonia	89–91	Real Madrid	Vitoria-Gasteiz
18:30	Scoring by quarter: 21–23, 13–24, 36–18, 19–26
	Pts: Shengelia 20; Rebs: Shengelia 7 Asts: Vildoza 5 PIR: Janning 23	Boxscore	Pts: Randolph 22; Rebs: Deck, Garuba 6 Asts: three players 4 PIR: Randolph 26	Arena: Buesa Arena; Attendance: 11,275; Referees: José Antonio Martín Bertrán, Fernando Calatrava, Alberto Sánchez

10 November 2019 8	Real Madrid	82–71	Unicaja	Madrid
18:30	Scoring by quarter: 21–13, 25–24, 16–14, 20–20
	Pts: Llull 13; Rebs: Tavares 10; Asts: Campazzo 3 PIR: Tavares 24	Boxscore	Pts: Adams, Suárez 16; Rebs: Gerun 7 Asts: Adams 2 PIR: Gerun 17	Arena: WiZink Center; Attendance: 8,510; Referees: Emilio Pérez Pizarro, Luis Castillo, Arnau Padrós

17 November 2019 9	RETAbet Bilbao Basket	82–81(OT)	Real Madrid	Bilbao
18:30	Scoring by quarter: 23–21, 18–16, 19–17, 17–23, Overtime: 5–4
	Pts: Bouteille 22; Rebs: Balvín 16; Asts: Rousselle 5 PIR: Bouteille 24	Boxscore	Pts: Llull 24; Rebs: Tavares 13; Asts: Llull 3 PIR: Tavares 24	Arena: Bilbao Arena; Attendance: 10,001; Referees: Antonio Conde, Vicente Bultó, Vicente Martínez

24 November 2019 10	Real Madrid	92–76	Herbalife Gran Canaria	Madrid
20:00	Scoring by quarter: 23–14, 25–16, 18–28, 26–18
	Pts: Laprovíttola 16; Rebs: Garuba, Laprovíttola 7 Asts: Laprovíttola 5 PIR: Laprovíttola 19	Boxscore	Pts: Shurna, Radičević 12; Rebs: Costello 6 Asts: three players 4 PIR: Shurna 20	Arena: WiZink Center; Attendance: 6,922; Referees: Óscar Perea, Jordi Aliaga, Esperanza Mendoza

1 December 2019 11	Casademont Zaragoza	84–67	Real Madrid	Zaragoza
18:30	Scoring by quarter: 20–17, 22–16, 17–14, 25–20
	Pts: Radović 14; Rebs: Radović 14; Asts: San Miguel 6 PIR: Hlinason 17	Boxscore	Pts: Carroll 14; Rebs: Garuba 8 Asts: Campazzo 6 PIR: Campazzo 13	Arena: Pabellón Príncipe Felipe; Attendance: 10,195; Referees: Emilio Pérez Pizarro, Javier Torres, Alfonso Olivares

8 December 2019 12	Real Madrid	104–93	San Pablo Burgos	Madrid
20:00	Scoring by quarter: 26–13, 29–24, 27–28, 22–28
	Pts: Thompkins 27; Rebs: Tavares 11; Asts: Campazzo 7 PIR: Thompkins 30	Boxscore	Pts: McFadden 23; Rebs: Lima 11; Asts: Fitipaldo 6 PIR: McFadden 28	Arena: WiZink Center; Attendance: 8,459; Referees: Fernando Calatrava, Vicente Bultó, Yasmina Alcaraz

14 December 2019 13	Coosur Real Betis	64–84	Real Madrid	Seville
20:30	Scoring by quarter: 10–26, 15–15, 17–21, 22–22
	Pts: Conger 20; Rebs: Conger 7 Asts: Sipahi 5 PIR: Conger 20	Boxscore	Pts: Causeur 18; Rebs: Tavares 9 Asts: Campazzo 6 PIR: Causeur, Thompkins 16	Arena: San Pablo; Attendance: 6,415; Referees: Miguel Ángel Pérez Pérez, José Ramón García Ortiz, Jacobo Rial

22 December 2019 14	Real Madrid	91–60	MoraBanc Andorra	Madrid
17:00	Scoring by quarter: 24–12, 26–2, 20–23, 21–23
	Pts: Thompkins 14; Rebs: Tavares 12; Asts: Fernández, Thompkins 5 PIR: Tavares 25	Boxscore	Pts: Musli 17; Rebs: Musli 7 Asts: Hannah 5 PIR: Musli 17	Arena: WiZink Center; Attendance: 8,989; Referees: Óscar Perea, Sergio Manuel, Rubén Sánchez

29 December 2019 15	Barça	83–63	Real Madrid	Barcelona
18:30	Scoring by quarter: 22–5, 17–22, 23–18, 21–18
	Pts: Mirotić 20; Rebs: Mirotić 6 Asts: Delaney, Kuric 3 PIR: Hanga 18	Boxscore	Pts: Thompkins 13; Rebs: Garuba 5 Asts: Campazzo 6 PIR: Thompkins, Randolph 12	Arena: Palau Blaugrana; Attendance: 7,387; Referees: Daniel Hierrezuelo, Juan de Dios Oyón, Rafael Serrano

6 January 2020 16	Real Madrid	85–78(OT)	Valencia Basket	Madrid
18:30	Scoring by quarter: 26–19, 14–21, 16–27, 20–9, Overtime: 9–2
	Pts: Fernández 22; Rebs: Tavares 7 Asts: Campazzo 8 PIR: Fernández 21	Boxscore	Pts: Abalde 16; Rebs: Dubljević 11; Asts: Loyd, Van Rossom 4 PIR: Abalde 16	Arena: WiZink Center; Attendance: 7,256; Referees: José Antonio Martín Bertrán, Luis Castillo, Iyán González

12 January 2020 17	Movistar Estudiantes	72–87	Real Madrid	Madrid
18:30	Scoring by quarter: 19–22, 11–31, 19–16, 23–18
	Pts: Kadji 19; Rebs: Arteaga 7 Asts: Douglas 4 PIR: Kadji 14	Boxscore	Pts: Mickey 20; Rebs: Tavares 8 Asts: Laprovíttola 10; PIR: Thompkins 29	Arena: WiZink Center; Attendance: 13,165; Referees: Emilio Pérez Pizarro, Jorge Martínez, Carlos Merino

19 January 2020 18	Real Madrid	94–95	Kirolbet Baskonia	Madrid
18:30	Scoring by quarter: 32–18, 6–21, 22–24, 34–32
	Pts: Campazzo 27; Rebs: Tavares 8 Asts: Campazzo 4 PIR: Campazzo 23	Boxscore	Pts: Henry 26; Rebs: Polonara 9 Asts: Stauskas 5 PIR: Henry 27	Arena: WiZink Center; Attendance: 9,852; Referees: Antonio Conde, Sergio Manuel, Vicente Martínez

26 January 2020 19	Baxi Manresa	75–80	Real Madrid	Manresa
17:00	Scoring by quarter: 17–26, 21–14, 24–17, 13–23
	Pts: Vaulet 19; Rebs: Mitrović 6 Asts: Cvetković 6 PIR: Vaulet 20	Boxscore	Pts: Deck 17; Rebs: Deck 11; Asts: Campazzo 4 PIR: Deck 28	Arena: Nou Congost; Attendance: 5,000; Referees: Carlos Cortés, Martín Caballero, Arnau Padrós

2 February 2020 20	Real Madrid	83–86	Club Joventut Badalona	Madrid
12:30	Scoring by quarter: 17–10, 25–24, 28–27, 13–25
	Pts: Carroll 15; Rebs: Mickey 10; Asts: three players 4 PIR: Deck 21	Boxscore	Pts: Prepelič 22; Rebs: López-Arostegui 10; Asts: Wroten 5 PIR: Prepelič 22	Arena: WiZink Center; Attendance: 8,224; Referees: Óscar Perea, Javier Torres, Iyán González

9 February 2020 21	Real Madrid	93–69	Coosur Real Betis	Madrid
12:30	Scoring by quarter: 27–12, 26–19, 20–20, 20–18
	Pts: Carroll 16; Rebs: Deck, Tavares 6 Asts: Campazzo 13; PIR: Campazzo 25	Boxscore	Pts: Green 15; Rebs: Niang 7 Asts: three players 2 PIR: Niang, Whittington 11	Arena: WiZink Center; Attendance: 7,564; Referees: Emilio Pérez Pizarro, Rafael Serrano, David Sánchez Benito

1 March 2020 22	Unicaja	88–92	Real Madrid	Málaga
18:30	Scoring by quarter: 16–25, 22–19, 18–25, 32–23
	Pts: Adams 20; Rebs: Gerun 9 Asts: Adams 6 PIR: Adams 24	Boxscore	Pts: Carroll, Tavares 17; Rebs: Tavares 9 Asts: Campazzo 11; PIR: Tavares 20	Arena: Martín Carpena; Attendance: 10,020; Referees: Carlos Cortés, Luis Miguel Castillo, Alfonso Olivares

8 March 2020 23	Real Madrid	92–70	Casademont Zaragoza	Madrid
12:30	Scoring by quarter: 21–18, 26–13, 21–20, 24–19
	Pts: Carroll 14; Rebs: Garuba 12; Asts: Campazzo 7 PIR: three players 17	Boxscore	Pts: Benzing 12; Rebs: Thompson 7 Asts: Brussino, Seeley 4 PIR: Hlinason 12	Arena: WiZink Center; Attendance: 8,346; Referees: Daniel Hierrezuelo, Francisco José Araña, Esperanza Mendoza

24	Montakit Fuenlabrada	vs.	Real Madrid	Fuenlabrada
		Boxscore		Arena: Fernando Martín

25	Real Madrid	vs.	Barça	Madrid
		Boxscore		Arena: WiZink Center

26	MoraBanc Andorra	vs.	Real Madrid	Andorra la Vella
		Boxscore		Arena: M.I. Govern Andorra

27	Real Madrid	vs.	Movistar Estudiantes	Madrid
		Boxscore		Arena: WiZink Center

28	UCAM Murcia	vs.	Real Madrid	Murcia
		Boxscore		Arena: Palacio de Deportes

29	San Pablo Burgos	vs.	Real Madrid	Burgos
		Boxscore		Arena: Coliseum Burgos

30	Real Madrid	vs.	Iberostar Tenerife	Madrid
		Boxscore		Arena: WiZink Center

31	Valencia Basket	vs.	Real Madrid	Valencia
		Boxscore		Arena: La Fonteta

32	Real Madrid	vs.	Monbus Obradoiro	Madrid
		Boxscore		Arena: WiZink Center

33	Real Madrid	vs.	RETAbet Bilbao Basket	Madrid
		Boxscore		Arena: WiZink Center

34	Herbalife Gran Canaria	vs.	Real Madrid	Las Palmas
		Boxscore		Arena: Gran Canaria Arena

==== Playoffs ====
===== Group stage =====
Pos	Team	Pld	W	L	PF	PA	PD	Qualification
1	Valencia Basket (H)	5	4	1	460	411	+49	Qualification to the semifinals
2	San Pablo Burgos	5	3	2	444	440	+4	Qualification to the semifinals
3	Real Madrid	5	3	2	441	429	+12	
4	Herbalife Gran Canaria	5	2	3	425	448	−23	
5	MoraBanc Andorra	5	2	3	452	450	+2	
6	Casademont Zaragoza	5	1	4	423	467	−44	

Source: ACB
(H) Hosts

18 June 2020 1	Real Madrid	91–73	Herbalife Gran Canaria	Valencia
18:30	Scoring by quarter: 37–16, 21–32, 11–14, 22–11
	Pts: Carroll, Llull 19; Rebs: Thompkins 8 Asts: Deck 4 PIR: Llull 20	Boxscore	Pts: Costello 26; Rebs: Costello 8 Asts: Cook 4 PIR: Costello 28	Arena: La Fonteta; Referees: José Antonio Martín Bertrán, Juan Carlos García González, Joaquín García González

20 June 2020 2	San Pablo Burgos	87–83	Real Madrid	Valencia
15:30	Scoring by quarter: 22–23, 22–18, 24–21, 19–21
	Pts: McFadden 18; Rebs: Aguilar 11; Asts: three players 3 PIR: McFadden 19	Boxscore	Pts: Campazzo, Llull 13; Rebs: Tavares 10; Asts: three players 3 PIR: Tavares 28	Arena: La Fonteta; Referees: Fernando Calatrava, Carlos Cortés, Rafael Serrano

22 June 2020 3	Real Madrid	95–90	Valencia Basket	Valencia
18:30	Scoring by quarter: 31–21, 25–31, 18–19, 21–19
	Pts: Campazzo 29; Rebs: Tavares 9 Asts: Campazzo 11; PIR: Campazzo 42	Boxscore	Pts: Abalde 17; Rebs: Loyd, Tobey 6 Asts: Colom 4 PIR: Abalde 21	Arena: La Fonteta; Referees: Emilio Pérez Pizarro, Fernando Calatrava, Arnau Padros

24 June 2020 4	MoraBanc Andorra	91–75	Real Madrid	Valencia
18:30	Scoring by quarter: 19–12, 23–18, 29–28, 20–17
	Pts: Hannah 23; Rebs: Pérez 7 Asts: Massenat 5 PIR: Hannah 20	Boxscore	Pts: Campazzo 18; Rebs: Tavares, Thompkins 7 Asts: Campazzo 6 PIR: Campazzo 26	Arena: La Fonteta; Referees: Daniel Hierrezuelo, Sergio Manuel, Javier Torres

26 June 2020 5	Real Madrid	97–88	Casademont Zaragoza	Valencia
21:30	Scoring by quarter: 22–17, 26–19, 29–25, 20–27
	Pts: Tavares 22; Rebs: Tavares 14; Asts: Campazzo 6 PIR: Tavares 43	Boxscore	Pts: Ennis 13; Rebs: Barreiro 5 Asts: Alocén 6 PIR: Alocén 23	Arena: La Fonteta; Referees: Carlos Peruga, Óscar Perea, Joaquín García González

=== EuroLeague ===
==== League table ====
Pos	Team	Pld	W	L	PF	PA	PD
1	(Turkey) Anadolu Efes	28	24	4	2432	2166	+266
2	(Spain) Real Madrid	28	22	6	2371	2165	+206
3	(Spain) Barcelona	28	22	6	2357	2193	+164
4	(Russia) CSKA Moscow	28	19	9	2305	2125	+180
5	(Israel) Maccabi Tel Aviv	28	19	9	2291	2164	+127

Source: EuroLeague
Rules for classification: All points scored in extra period(s) were not counted in the standings, nor for any tie-break situation.

==== Results summary ====
Overall						Home					Away				
Pld	W	L	PF	PA	PD	W	L	PF	PA	PD	W	L	PF	PA	PD
28	22	6	2371	2165	+206	13	1	1235	1096	+139	9	5	1136	1069	+67

Source: Competitive matches

==== Results by round ====
Round	1	2	3	4	5	6	7	8	9	10	11	12	13	14	15	16	17	18	19	20	21	22	23	24	25	26	27	28	29	30	31	32	33	34
Ground	H	H	A	A	A	H	A	H	H	H	A	H	H	H	A	A	A	H	A	A	H	A	H	A	A	H	A	H	H	A	A	H	A	H
Result	W	W	L	L	L	W	W	W	W	W	W	W	W	W	W	W	W	W	L	L	L	W	W	W	W	W	W	W	V	V	V	V	V	V
Position	9	5	6	11	13	11	8	7	6	3	3	3	2	3	1	1	2	2	2	2	3	4	3	2	2	2	2	2						

Source: Competitive matches
A = Away; H = Home; W = Win; L = Loss; V = Void

==== Matches ====
3 October 2019 1	Real Madrid (Spain)	81–77	(Turkey) Fenerbahçe Beko	Madrid
21:00	Scoring by quarter: 30–21, 13–21, 21–13, 17–22
	Pts: Taylor 19; Rebs: Randolph, Tavares 5 Asts: Campazzo 8 PIR: Campazzo 24	Boxscore	Pts: de Colo 22; Rebs: Williams 10; Asts: Sloukas 5 PIR: de Colo, Williams 20	Arena: WiZink Center; Attendance: 10,434; Referees: Robert Lottermoser, Oļegs Latiševs, Mehdi Difallah

10 October 2019 2	Real Madrid (Spain)	86–85	(Israel) Maccabi FOX Tel Aviv	Madrid
21:00	Scoring by quarter: 22–22, 28–22, 15–21, 21–20
	Pts: Mickey 16; Rebs: Mickey 11; Asts: Llull 5 PIR: Mickey 30	Boxscore	Pts: Wilbekin 22; Rebs: Hunter 7 Asts: Wilbekin 4 PIR: Wilbekin 27	Arena: WiZink Center; Attendance: 9,738; Referees: Damir Javor, Carmelo Paternicò, Uroš Obrknežević

17 October 2019 3	Žalgiris (Lithuania)	86–73	(Spain) Real Madrid	Kaunas
19:00	Scoring by quarter: 18–15, 20–19, 19–26, 29–13
	Pts: LeDay 26; Rebs: LeDay 9 Asts: Grigonis 5 PIR: LeDay 35	Boxscore	Pts: Randolph 15; Rebs: Mickey 6 Asts: Llull 4 PIR: Randolph 15	Arena: Žalgirio Arena; Attendance: 15,109; Referees: Sreten Radović, Robert Lottermoser, Seffi Shemmesh

24 October 2019 4	Anadolu Efes (Turkey)	76–60	(Spain) Real Madrid	Istanbul
19:30	Scoring by quarter: 15–11, 14–20, 27–19, 20–10
	Pts: Dunston, Simon 17; Rebs: Simon 9 Asts: Micić, Simon 4 PIR: Dunston 27	Boxscore	Pts: Llull 14; Rebs: Mickey 8 Asts: Campazzo 7 PIR: Fernández 15	Arena: Sinan Erdem Dome; Attendance: 15,167; Referees: Luigi Lamonica, Milivoje Jovčić, Milan Nedović

30 October 2019 5	Bayern Munich (Germany)	95–86	(Spain) Real Madrid	Munich
20:30	Scoring by quarter: 22–20, 19–18, 26–19, 28–29
	Pts: Monroe 18; Rebs: Lučić 6 Asts: Lô 7 PIR: Barthel 24	Boxscore	Pts: Randolph 17; Rebs: Randolph 10; Asts: Campazzo 6 PIR: Garuba, Randolph 20	Arena: Audi Dome; Attendance: 5,763; Referees: Matej Boltauzer, Spiros Gkontas, Semen Ovinov

1 November 2019 6	Real Madrid (Spain)	85–71	(Germany) ALBA Berlin	Madrid
21:00	Scoring by quarter: 28–14, 14–24, 22–18, 21–15
	Pts: three players 12; Rebs: Tavares 8 Asts: Campazzo 8 PIR: Tavares 20	Boxscore	Pts: Hermannsson 13; Rebs: Nnoko, Sikma 6 Asts: Sikma 4 PIR: Thiemann 15	Arena: WiZink Center; Attendance: 10,289; Referees: Christos Christodoulou, Sérgio Silva, Robert Vyklický

7 November 2019 7	Crvena zvezda mts (Serbia)	60–75	(Spain) Real Madrid	Belgrade
19:00	Scoring by quarter: 9–12, 18–21, 25–16, 8–26
	Pts: Baron 17; Rebs: L. Brown 6 Asts: L. Brown 5 PIR: L. Brown 24	Boxscore	Pts: Llull 16; Rebs: Tavares 9 Asts: Llull 5 PIR: Tavares 21	Arena: Štark Arena; Attendance: 16,457; Referees: Carmelo Paternicò, Emin Moğulkoç, Gytis Vilius

14 November 2019 8	Real Madrid (Spain)	86–76	(Spain) Barcelona	Madrid
21:00	Scoring by quarter: 32–14, 16–36, 23–14, 15–12
	Pts: Randolph 16; Rebs: Randolph 7 Asts: Campazzo 6 PIR: Randolph 20	Boxscore	Pts: Mirotić 19; Rebs: Higgins 6 Asts: Delaney 4 PIR: Kuric, Tomić 16	Arena: WiZink Center; Attendance: 12,729; Referees: Luigi Lamonica, Damir Javor, Tomasz Trawicki

19 November 2019 9	Real Madrid (Spain)	104–76	(Russia) Khimki	Madrid
21:00	Scoring by quarter: 31–25, 34–17, 27–14, 12–20
	Pts: Randolph 19; Rebs: Deck, Tavares 5 Asts: Sergio Llull 6 PIR: Randolph 23	Boxscore	Pts: Kramer 14; Rebs: Monia, Evans 5 Asts: Jović 5 PIR: Gill 16	Arena: WiZink Center; Attendance: 8,873; Referees: Saša Pukl, Miloš Koljenšić, Amit Balak

22 November 2019 10	Real Madrid (Spain)	97–81	(Russia) CSKA Moscow	Madrid
21:00	Scoring by quarter: 23–19, 29–29, 23–16, 22–17
	Pts: Campazzo 18; Rebs: Deck 11; Asts: Campazzo, Deck 6 PIR: Deck 33	Boxscore	Pts: Voigtmann 20; Rebs: Bolomboy 6 Asts: James 5 PIR: Voigtmann 19	Arena: WiZink Center; Attendance: 11,112; Referees: Robert Lottermoser, Oļegs Latiševs, Uroš Nikolić

29 November 2019 11	Zenit Saint Petersburg (Russia)	71–86	(Spain) Real Madrid	Saint Petersburg
18:00	Scoring by quarter: 19–22, 18–22, 19–22, 15–20
	Pts: Ayón 18; Rebs: Ayón 10; Asts: Albicy 5 PIR: Thomas 20	Boxscore	Pts: Campazzo 19; Rebs: Tavares 12; Asts: Campazzo 6 PIR: Deck 25	Arena: Sibur Arena; Attendance: 6,184; Referees: Christos Christodoulou, Sašo Petek, Anne Panther

5 December 2019 12	Real Madrid (Spain)	111–99	(Spain) Valencia Basket	Madrid
21:00	Scoring by quarter: 30–29, 23–20, 27–21, 31–29
	Pts: Randolph 18; Rebs: Thompkins 6 Asts: Campazzo 17; PIR: Randolph 28	Boxscore	Pts: Loyd 21; Rebs: Dubljević, Labeyrie 6 Asts: Loyd 5 PIR: Loyd 25	Arena: WiZink Center; Attendance: 8,956; Referees: Ilija Belošević, Carmelo Paternicò, Seffi Shemmesh

12 December 2019 13	Real Madrid (Spain)	93–77	(Greece) Olympiacos	Madrid
21:00	Scoring by quarter: 21–10, 20–20, 31–18, 21–29
	Pts: Causeur 18; Rebs: Tavares 10; Asts: Campazzo 6 PIR: Causeur 21	Boxscore	Pts: Cherry, Vezenkov 12; Rebs: Reed 6 Asts: Rochestie 9 PIR: Reed 16	Arena: WiZink Center; Attendance: 8,206; Referees: Damir Javor, Jakub Zamojski, Gytis Vilius

17 December 2019 14	Real Madrid (Spain)	76–67	(Italy) A|X Armani Exchange Milan	Madrid
21:00	Scoring by quarter: 18–21, 12–18, 24–13, 22–15
	Pts: Randolph 16; Rebs: Tavares, Randolph 7 Asts: Campazzo 12; PIR: Campazzo 25	Boxscore	Pts: Micov 22; Rebs: Brooks 9 Asts: Brooks, Rodríguez 2 PIR: Micov 18	Arena: WiZink Center; Attendance: 8,933; Referees: Sreten Radović, Saša Pukl, Joseph Bissang

19 December 2019 15	Kirolbet Baskonia (Spain)	55–77	(Spain) Real Madrid	Vitoria-Gasteiz
21:00	Scoring by quarter: 13–15, 16–30, 15–12, 11–20
	Pts: Shields 14; Rebs: Fall 9 Asts: Henry, Shengelia 2 PIR: Shields 12	Boxscore	Pts: Mickey 15; Rebs: Mickey 8 Asts: Laprovíttola 8 PIR: Mickey 21	Arena: Buesa Arena; Attendance: 11,648; Referees: Luigi Lamonica, Spiros Gkontas, Milan Nedović

26 December 2019 16	Panathinaikos OPAP (Greece)	75–87	(Spain) Real Madrid	Athens
20:00	Scoring by quarter: 18–22, 16–22, 24–22, 17–21
	Pts: Calathes 19; Rebs: Fredette 9 Asts: Calathes 7 PIR: Fredette 22	Boxscore	Pts: Randolph 22; Rebs: Tavares 14; Asts: Campazzo 8 PIR: Tavares 32	Arena: O.A.K.A. Attendance: 12,513; Referees: Matej Boltauzer, Oļegs Latiševs, Mehdi Difallah

3 January 2020 17	LDLC ASVEL (France)	77–87	(Spain) Real Madrid	Villeurbanne
20:45	Scoring by quarter: 21–23, 16–23, 22–20, 18–15
	Pts: Kahudi 18; Rebs: Jekiri 11; Asts: Jo. Taylor 5 PIR: Kahudi 22	Boxscore	Pts: Thompkins 20; Rebs: Mickey, Thompkins 7 Asts: Campazzo 9 PIR: Mickey 24	Arena: Astroballe; Attendance: 5,548; Referees: Fernando Rocha, Emin Moğulkoç, Nick van den Broeck

9 January 2020 18	Real Madrid (Spain)	88–82	(Lithuania) Žalgiris	Madrid
21:00	Scoring by quarter: 20–18, 27–23, 21–18, 20–23
	Pts: Thompkins 20; Rebs: Thompkins 5 Asts: Campazzo 8 PIR: Thompkins 21	Boxscore	Pts: Lekavičius 21; Rebs: three players 4 Asts: Walkup 6 PIR: Lekavičius 20	Arena: WiZink Center; Attendance: 9,096; Referees: Damir Javor, Michele Rossi, Aare Halliko

14 January 2020 19	CSKA Moscow (Russia)	60–55	(Spain) Real Madrid	Moscow
18:00	Scoring by quarter: 14–21, 12–12, 17–10, 17–12
	Pts: James 19; Rebs: Kurbanov 10; Asts: six players 1 PIR: Hines, Kurbanov 13	Boxscore	Pts: Thompkins 14; Rebs: Tavares 9 Asts: Campazzo 5 PIR: Campazzo 18	Arena: Megasport Arena; Attendance: 8,517; Referees: Christos Christodoulou, Carmelo Paternicò, Joseph Bissang

16 January 2020 20	Khimki (Russia)	102–94	(Spain) Real Madrid	Mytishchi
18:00	Scoring by quarter: 25–21, 30–23, 25–25, 22–25
	Pts: Shved 21; Rebs: Shved, Timma 5 Asts: Shved 13; PIR: Shved 31	Boxscore	Pts: Mickey 20; Rebs: Mickey 5 Asts: Laprovíttola 6 PIR: Mickey 29	Arena: Mytishchi Arena; Attendance: 4,711; Referees: Robert Lottermoser, Tomislav Hordov, Sašo Petek

24 January 2020 21	Real Madrid (Spain)	75–80	(Turkey) Anadolu Efes	Madrid
21:00	Scoring by quarter: 20–20, 20–23, 15–16, 20–21
	Pts: Thompkins 15; Rebs: Tavares 12; Asts: Llull 5 PIR: Tavares 20	Boxscore	Pts: Larkin 32; Rebs: Singleton 7 Asts: Larkin, Simon 4 PIR: Larkin 36	Arena: WiZink Center; Attendance: 11,338; Referees: Ilija Belošević, Sreten Radović, Gytis Vilius

30 January 2020 22	Maccabi FOX Tel Aviv (Israel)	77–81	(Spain) Real Madrid	Tel Aviv
20:05	Scoring by quarter: 19–21, 19–15, 11–21, 28–24
	Pts: Wilbekin 21; Rebs: Hunter 6 Asts: Jackson, Wilbekin 4 PIR: Wilbekin 22	Boxscore	Pts: Randolph 19; Rebs: Tavares 10; Asts: Campazzo 8 PIR: Randolph 23	Arena: Menora Mivtachim Arena; Attendance: 10,689; Referees: Luigi Lamonica, Fernando Rocha, Uroš Nikolić

4 February 2020 23	Real Madrid (Spain)	70–69	(Spain) Kirolbet Baskonia	Madrid
21:00	Scoring by quarter: 14–19, 23–19, 16–11, 17–20
	Pts: Thompkins 20; Rebs: Thompkins 6 Asts: Campazzo 11; PIR: Campazzo 21	Boxscore	Pts: Shields 14; Rebs: Fall 7 Asts: Christon, Shengelia 4 PIR: Shields 14	Arena: WiZink Center; Attendance: 8,465; Referees: Saša Pukl, Emin Moğulkoç, Petri Mäntylä

6 February 2020 24	ALBA Berlin (Germany)	97–103	(Spain) Real Madrid	Berlin
20:00	Scoring by quarter: 25–41, 35–9, 11–29, 26–24
	Pts: Giedraitis 17; Rebs: Nnoko, Sikma 7 Asts: Sikma 8 PIR: Giedraitis 20	Boxscore	Pts: Carroll, Randolph 27; Rebs: Tavares 8 Asts: Campazzo 19; PIR: Randolph 33	Arena: Mercedes-Benz Arena; Attendance: 10,457; Referees: Oļegs Latiševs, Mario Majkić, Uroš Obrknežević

20 February 2020 25	Fenerbahçe Beko (Turkey)	65–94	(Spain) Real Madrid	Istanbul
18:45	Scoring by quarter: 15–22, 16–25, 20–24, 14–23
	Pts: de Colo 21; Rebs: Kalinić 4 Asts: de Colo 6 PIR: de Colo 23	Boxscore	Pts: Carroll 20; Rebs: Tavares 8 Asts: Campazzo 8 PIR: Carroll, Tavares 19	Arena: Ülker Sports and Event Hall; Attendance: 12,705; Referees: Ilija Belošević, Borys Ryzhyk, Carmelo Paternicò

24 February 2020 26	Real Madrid (Spain)	96–78	(Greece) Panathinaikos OPAP	Madrid
21:00	Scoring by quarter: 27–16, 21–25, 25–24, 23–13
	Pts: Tavares 15; Rebs: Tavares 10; Asts: Campazzo 10; PIR: Tavares 30	Boxscore	Pts: Calathes 13; Rebs: Papapetrou 6 Asts: Calathes 6 PIR: Thomas 15	Arena: WiZink Center; Attendance: 9,893; Referees: Robert Lottermoser, Matej Boltauzer, Tomislav Hordov

3 March 2020 27	A|X Armani Exchange Milan (Italy)	73–78	(Spain) Real Madrid	Assago
20:45	Scoring by quarter: 25–21, 20–24, 10–11, 18–32
	Pts: Moraschini 21; Rebs: Micov, Moraschini 6 Asts: Micov 3 PIR: Moraschini 24	Boxscore	Pts: Fernández 16; Rebs: Tavares 12; Asts: Laprovíttola 6 PIR: Tavares 29	Arena: Mediolanum Forum; Attendance: 0 (Note: Due to COVID-19 pandemic, Euroleague Basketball decided there would be no individual admission, including fans, VIPs, journalists or additional club staff. As a result, the match was held behind closed doors.); Referees: Christos Christodoulou, Fernando Rocha, Miloš Koljenšić

5 March 2020 28	Real Madrid (Spain)	87–78	(France) LDLC ASVEL	Madrid
21:00	Scoring by quarter: 14–20, 25–18, 28–25, 20–15
	Pts: Carroll 19; Rebs: Tavares 8 Asts: Campazzo 7 PIR: Carroll 19	Boxscore	Pts: Jean-Charles 13; Rebs: Jekiri 11; Asts: Strazel 5 PIR: Jekiri 18	Arena: WiZink Center; Attendance: 7,019; Referees: Sreten Radović, Uroš Nikolić, Clemens Fritz

29	Real Madrid (Spain)	vs.	(Serbia) Crvena zvezda mts	Madrid
		Boxscore		Arena: WiZink Center

30	Olympiacos (Greece)	vs.	(Spain) Real Madrid	Piraeus
		Boxscore		Arena: Peace and Friendship Stadium

31	Valencia Basket (Spain)	vs.	(Spain) Real Madrid	Valencia
		Boxscore		Arena: La Fonteta

32	Real Madrid (Spain)	vs.	(Germany) Bayern Munich	Madrid
		Boxscore		Arena: WiZink Center

33	Barcelona (Spain)	vs.	(Spain) Real Madrid	Barcelona
		Boxscore		Arena: Palau Blaugrana

34	Real Madrid (Spain)	vs.	(Russia) Zenit Saint Petersburg	Madrid
		Boxscore		Arena: WiZink Center

=== Copa del Rey ===
==== Quarterfinals ====
13 February 2020	Real Madrid	93–83	RETAbet Bilbao Basket	Málaga
21:30	Scoring by quarter: 23–21, 27–26, 23–16, 20–20
	Pts: Llull 19; Rebs: Tavares 14; Asts: Campazzo 9 PIR: Tavares 26	Boxscore	Pts: Rousselle 16; Rebs: Balvín 12; Asts: Rousselle 5 PIR: Balvín 19	Arena: Martín Carpena; Attendance: 10,070; Referees: Carlos Peruga, Fernando Calatrava, Juan de Dios Oyón

==== Semifinals ====
15 February 2020	Real Madrid	91–68	Valencia Basket	Málaga
18:30	Scoring by quarter: 18–11, 16–9, 33–24, 24–24
	Pts: Randolph 16; Rebs: Tavares 10; Asts: Campazzo 9 PIR: Campazzo 31	Boxscore	Pts: Abalde 12; Rebs: Abalde, Dubljević 6 Asts: Colom, Sastre 5 PIR: Abalde 17	Arena: Martín Carpena; Attendance: 10,437; Referees: Daniel Hierrezuelo, Carlos Peruga, Juan de Dios Oyón

==== Final ====
16 February 2020	Unicaja	68–95	Real Madrid	Málaga
18:30	Scoring by quarter: 13–26, 15–17, 14–25, 26–27
	Pts: Brizuela 22; Rebs: Suárez 6 Asts: Adams, Brizuela 3 PIR: Brizuela 19	Boxscore	Pts: Carroll 20; Rebs: Reyes 5 Asts: Campazzo 13; PIR: Campazzo 29	Arena: Martín Carpena; Attendance: 10,874; Referees: José Antonio Martín Bertrán, Carlos Peruga, Fernando Calatrava

=== Supercopa de España ===
==== Semifinals ====
21 September 2019	Real Madrid	116–61	Montakit Fuenlabrada	Madrid
21:00	Scoring by quarter: 28–11, 24–10, 31–22, 33–18
	Pts: Carroll 18; Rebs: Tavares 10; Asts: Campazzo 9 PIR: Tavares 27	Boxscore	Pts: Bobrov 11; Rebs: Mockevičius 12; Asts: Rowland 5 PIR: Mockevičius 12	Arena: WiZink Center; Attendance: 11,853; Referees: Carlos Peruga, Fernando Calatrava, Jordi Aliaga

==== Final ====
22 September 2019	Real Madrid	89–79	Barça	Madrid
19:00	Scoring by quarter: 21–20, 27–13, 21–30, 20–16
	Pts: Campazzo 16; Rebs: Mickey 7 Asts: Campazzo 5 PIR: Campazzo 22	Boxscore	Pts: Davies 23; Rebs: Mirotić 6 Asts: Pangos 5 PIR: Davies 20	Arena: WiZink Center; Attendance: 12,348; Referees: Daniel Hierrezuelo, Carlos Peruga, Fernando Calatrava

== Statistics ==
Legend
GP	Games played	GS	Games started	MPG	Minutes per game
FG%	Field-goal percentage	3FG%	3-point field-goal percentage	FT%	Free-throw percentage
RPG	Rebounds per game	APG	Assists per game	SPG	Steals per game
BPG	Blocks per game	PPG	Points per game	PIR	PIR per game

=== Liga ACB ===
Player	GP	GS	MPG	2FG%	3FG%	FT%	RPG	APG	SPG	BPG	PPG	PIR
Facundo Campazzo	26	20	22:35	.448	.408	.896	2.5	5.0	1.1	0.0	11.2	14.9
Jaycee Carroll	25	12	17:13	.476	.400	.878	1.7	0.5	0.3	0.1	10.4	7.3
Fabien Causeur	26	9	14:49	.585	.276	.767	1.3	1.4	0.6	0.0	6.2	5.8
Gabriel Deck	23	19	20:25	.648	.439	.840	3.7	1.5	0.6	0.1	9.5	12.5
Rudy Fernández	19	1	16:34	.333	.322	.798	2.3	1.6	0.7	0.3	5.2	5.9
Usman Garuba	24	12	16:46	.602	.315	.558	5.3	0.5	0.5	0.9	4.4	7.4
Nicolás Laprovíttola	26	5	15:05	.325	.457	.732	1.9	2.9	0.4	0.0	6.0	6.9
Sergio Llull	19	5	20:27	.514	.366	.907	1.2	2.7	0.7	0.1	12.1	9.8
Salah Mejri	4	0	9:38	.600	.000	.333	2.0	0.8	0.3	0.3	3.3	2.3
Jordan Mickey	15	2	16:07	.533	.416	.654	4.1	0.3	0.7	0.9	6.8	7.7
Mario Nakić	9	1	9:11	.248	.504	.500	1.0	0.6	0.2	0.2	2.8	1.3
Anthony Randolph	20	14	18:11	.405	.413	.821	3.0	0.5	0.6	0.3	8.3	7.6
Felipe Reyes	15	0	9:01	.433	.493	.839	2.7	0.5	0.2	0.2	3.9	4.7
Matteo Spagnolo	1	0	0:34	.000	.000	.000	0.0	0.0	0.0	0.0	0.0	0.0
Edy Tavares	28	26	23:04	.708	.000	.727	7.8	0.4	0.5	1.9	8.4	16.2
Jeffery Taylor	22	9	16:20	.594	.453	.610	1.4	0.9	0.3	0.1	4.9	3.8
Trey Thompkins	17	5	23:58	.567	.404	.822	4.2	2.1	0.7	0.3	11.8	12.2
Boris Tišma	1	0	0:46	1.000	.000	.000	0.0	0.0	0.0	0.0	2.0	2.0

Source: ACB

=== EuroLeague ===
Player	GP	GS	MPG	2FG%	3FG%	FT%	RPG	APG	SPG	BPG	PPG	PIR
Facundo Campazzo	28	27	23:53	.523	.310	.870	2.3	7.1	1.4	0.0	9.9	15.4
Jaycee Carroll	22	6	13:24	.476	.405	.833	1.2	0.5	0.2	0.1	7.5	4.5
Fabien Causeur	25	12	16:19	.608	.473	.650	1.5	1.5	0.3	0.0	7.5	7.3
Gabriel Deck	24	17	20:04	.513	.259	.820	3.2	1.5	0.3	0.1	7.4	8.9
Rudy Fernández	25	3	19:57	.303	.416	.771	2.0	2.0	1.0	0.1	8.1	9.3
Usman Garuba	14	4	11:55	.742	.333	.500	2.9	0.4	0.9	0.3	4.4	6.4
Nicolás Laprovíttola	23	0	13:31	.556	.283	.867	1.4	3.0	0.3	0.0	5.0	5.5
Sergio Llull	16	2	18:33	.286	.288	.893	1.2	3.5	0.6	0.1	7.5	4.9
Salah Mejri	6	0	5:02	.667	.000	1.000	1.2	0.2	0.0	0.2	1.0	1.7
Jordan Mickey	26	2	16:35	.677	.333	.780	4.2	0.6	0.4	1.0	9.0	10.8
Mario Nakić	3	1	3:58	.750	.000	.000	0.7	0.0	0.3	0.0	2.0	1.3
Anthony Randolph	19	19	23:57	.531	.491	.766	4.3	0.4	0.8	0.2	13.7	15.1
Felipe Reyes	7	0	7:57	.500	.200	.833	1.6	0.4	0.3	0.1	3.4	2.4
Edy Tavares	28	28	22:55	.685	.000	.653	7.1	0.8	0.6	2.2	7.2	14.5
Jeffery Taylor	24	14	18:37	.512	.393	.667	2.1	1.3	0.4	0.1	4.8	3.9
Trey Thompkins	20	5	19:55	.578	.485	.893	3.9	0.7	0.5	0.2	10.8	11.3

Source: EuroLeague

=== Copa del Rey ===
Player	GP	GS	MPG	2FG%	3FG%	FT%	RPG	APG	SPG	BPG	PPG	PIR
Facundo Campazzo	3	3	26:54	.428	.600	.670	5.0	10.3	2.7	0.0	13.7	27.3
Jaycee Carroll	3	3	19:55	.769	.333	1.000	1.7	1.3	0.7	0.3	13.0	9.3
Fabien Causeur	3	0	12:17	.250	.498	.835	1.7	1.3	0.3	0.3	7.7	6.7
Gabriel Deck	3	3	24:55	.738	.493	.000	3.7	2.7	1.0	0.0	10.3	13.7
Rudy Fernández	3	0	7:33	.000	.300	.000	0.7	0.3	0.0	0.0	3.0	1.0
Nicolás Laprovíttola	2	0	2:57	.000	1.000	.000	0.0	0.5	0.0	0.0	1.5	1.0
Sergio Llull	3	0	15:06	.498	.353	1.000	1.7	1.0	0.0	0.3	9.7	7.0
Jordan Mickey	1	0	15:22	1.000	.000	.000	2.0	1.0	0.0	1.0	2.0	3.0
Anthony Randolph	3	3	21:42	.667	.418	1.000	3.7	0.3	0.3	0.7	10.0	11.3
Felipe Reyes	2	0	15:10	.250	.000	1.000	5.5	1.5	0.5	0.0	2.0	9.5
Edy Tavares	3	3	24:03	.824	.000	.835	9.3	1.0	1.0	1.3	11.0	21.0
Jeffery Taylor	3	0	15:59	.401	.498	.000	1.3	0.3	0.3	0.0	5.3	3.7
Trey Thompkins	2	0	21:28	1.000	.500	1.000	3.5	0.5	1.0	0.5	9.5	9.0

Source: ACB

=== Supercopa de España ===
Player	GP	GS	MPG	2FG%	3FG%	FT%	RPG	APG	SPG	BPG	PPG	PIR
Facundo Campazzo	2	2	22:13	.667	.714	.714	5.5	7.0	0.0	0.0	14.0	24.0
Jaycee Carroll	2	2	17:10	.500	.400	1.000	2.5	0.5	1.0	0.0	13.5	10.5
Fabien Causeur	1	0	14:04	.500	.500	.000	1.0	4.0	0.0	0.0	5.0	6.0
Gabriel Deck	2	0	24:25	.546	.000	.857	3.0	1.5	1.0	0.0	9.0	11.5
Rudy Fernández	2	0	14:34	.000	.625	1.000	2.5	0.5	0.5	0.0	9.5	11.5
Nicolás Laprovíttola	2	0	15:16	.500	.500	.800	2.0	3.5	1.5	0.0	8.5	10.5
Sergio Llull	2	0	18:51	.667	.333	1.000	1.5	2.5	0.5	0.0	8.5	9.5
Jordan Mickey	2	0	19:04	.556	1.000	.667	7.0	1.5	0.0	1.0	11.5	16.5
Anthony Randolph	2	2	13:37	.000	.500	1.000	2.0	0.0	0.0	0.0	7.0	4.5
Felipe Reyes	2	0	9:46	.714	.000	.500	0.5	0.0	0.0	0.0	5.5	4.0
Edy Tavares	2	2	17:43	.667	.000	.833	8.0	1.0	0.5	3.5	6.5	15.5
Jeffery Taylor	2	2	20:07	.800	.200	1.000	1.5	3.0	0.5	0.0	6.5	6.0

Source: ACB
