= Mario Nakić =

Serbian-Croatian basketball player (born 2001)

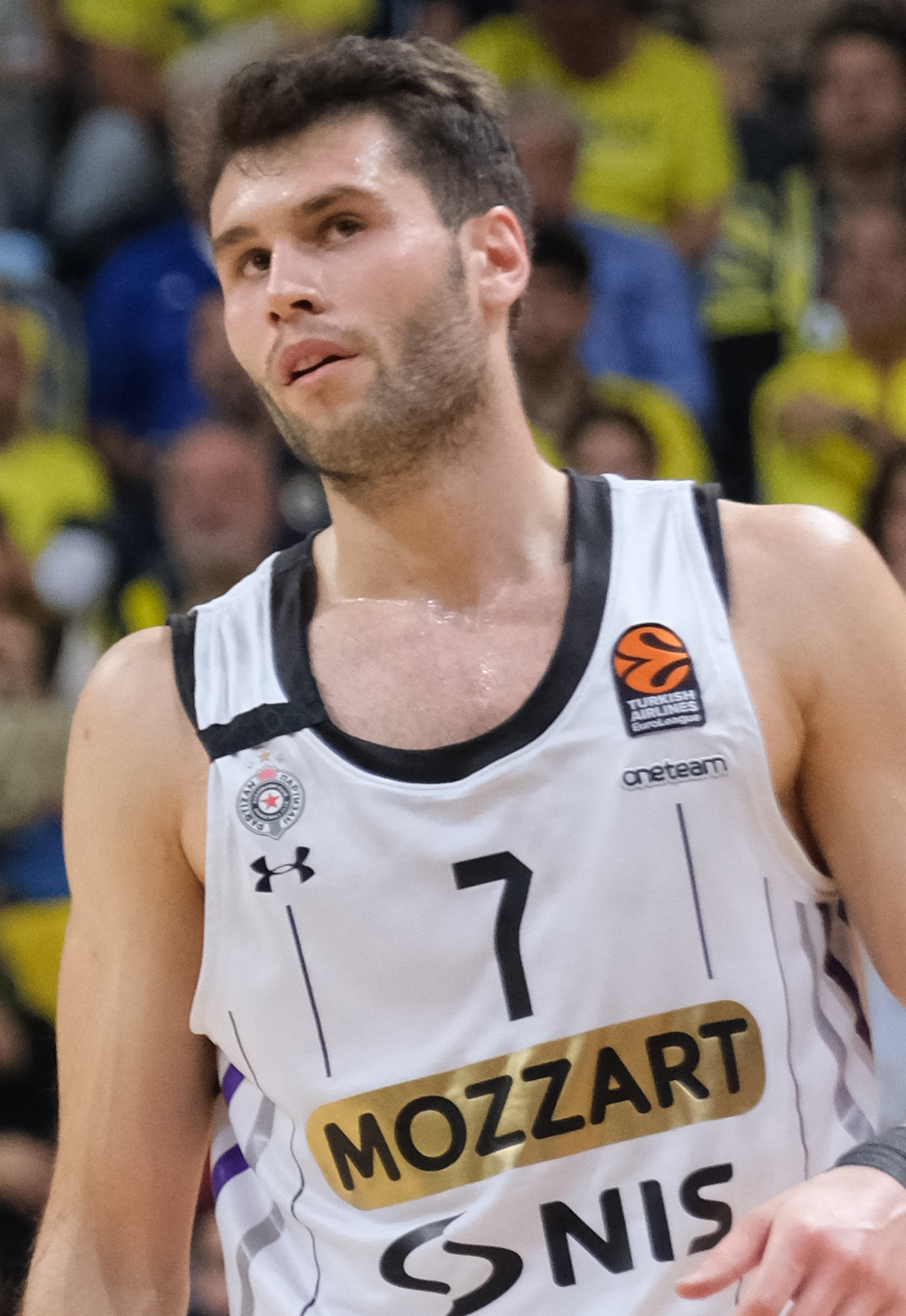
- Nakić with Partizan in 2024

No. 7 – Partizan Belgrade
- Position: Small forward
- League: Serbian SuperLeague; ABA League; EuroLeague

Personal information
- Born: 14 June 2001 (age 25) Belgrade, Serbia, FR Yugoslavia
- Listed height: 2.02 m (6 ft 8 in)
- Listed weight: 99 kg (218 lb)

Career information
- Playing career: 2018–present

Career history
- 2018–2021: Real Madrid
- 2020–2021: →Oostende
- 2021–2022: Andorra
- 2022–2024: Igokea
- 2024–present: Partizan

Career highlights
- ABA League champion (2025); Serbian League champion (2025); Belgian League champion (2021); Belgian Cup winner (2021); 2× Bosnian League champion (2023, 2024); Bosnian Cup winner (2023); EB Next Generation Tournament champion (2019); EB Next Generation Tournament MVP (2019)

Mario Nakić (Serbian Cyrillic: Марио Накић; born 14 June 2001) is a Serbian professional basketball player for Partizan Belgrade of the Serbian SuperLeague, the ABA League, and the EuroLeague.

== Early life and career ==
Nakić was born in Belgrade, Serbia, FR Yugoslavia to a Croatian father and a Serbian mother. His father is Ivo Nakić, a former Croatian professional basketball player. His mother is Zorica Desnica. Nakić's older half-brother is Filip Živojinović, a son of Serbian former tennis player Slobodan Živojinović.

He started his basketball career with the youth team of Zemun where he played until 2014. In the 2014–15 season, Nakić played with the youth selection of Serbian powerhouse Partizan. He moved to the Real Madrid's youth team one year later, for the 2015–16 season. He was selected to the all-tournament team for the 2017–18 season of the Next Generation Tournament. Nakić was a member of the Real Madrid U18 team that won the Next Generation Tournament in the 2018–19 season. He was named the MVP and selected to the all-tournament team after helping defeat Mega Bemax Belgrade in the final. He set championship game records with 33 points and a performance index rating of 41.

== Professional career ==
=== Real Madrid (2018–2021) ===
On 24 May 2018 Nakić made a debut with Real Madrid in the Liga ACB (the top-tier Spanish League). He scored two points in a Real Madrid's 2017–18 season loss from Herbalife Gran Canaria.

Following the 2020–21 season Nakić declared himself for the 2021 NBA draft. On 19 July 2021 he withdrawn his name from consideration for the 2021 NBA draft.

=== Andorra (2021–2022) ===
On 3 August 2021 he signed with MoraBanc Andorra of the Liga ACB. Previously declared, Nakić subsequently withdrawn his name from consideration for the 2022 NBA draft. In 27 ACB League games with Andorra, Nakić averaged 4.1 points and 2 rebounds per game. He also appeared in 18 EuroCup games, averaging 5.7 points and 2.7 rebounds per game with Andorra.

=== Igokea (2022–2024) ===
On 16 August 2022, Nakić signed a 3-year contract with Igokea of the ABA League. On October 27, 2022, suffered a season-ending injury against Czech team Nymburk. In his debut season with Igokea, Nakić appeared in only three ABA League games (before injury), averaging 14.7 points and 8.7 rebounds per game.

In 2023–24 season, Nakić returned to the court and appeared in 27 ABA League games with Igokea, averaging 8.3 points on 45.1% shooting from the field, 2.6 rebounds and 1.6 assists.

=== Partizan (2024–present) ===
On 20 August 2024, Nakić signed with Partizan Mozzart Bet of the Serbian SuperLeague, ABA League, and the EuroLeague. By signing for Partizan Mario is following in the footsteps of his father Ivo Nakić who also played for the club under the leadership of Željko Obradović and won the 1988–89 FIBA Korać Cup and 1991–92 FIBA European League. In his debut season with Partizan, Nakić averaged 2.1 points and 1 rebound over 12 EuroLeague games. During the 2024–25 season, Partizan managed to lift the record eighth ABA League championship, and the Serbian League championship, the first one after 11 seasons.

On September 29, 2025, Nakic signed a contract extension to stay with the team until the summer of 2027.

== National team career ==
Nakić was eligible to play for either Croatia or Serbia. In May 2019, the Croatian national team head coach Veljko Mršić stated that Nakić has not decided anything yet, but he is closer to play for Serbia. That was followed by confirmation of the Basketball Federation of Serbia Vice president Igor Rakočević. In the end, the Serbian head coach Aleksandar Đorđević confirmed that Nakić has not decided anything yet. In September 2022, Nakić stated that there is no decision yet which nation team he will represent.

On February 21, 2025, he made his debut for the senior national team of Serbia in the away match of the qualification for Eurobasket 2025 against Finland.

== Career achievements and awards ==
- EB Next Generation Tournament MVP (2019)
- 2× All-EB Next Generation Tournament Team (2018, 2019)

== Career statistics ==
Legend
GP	Games played	GS	Games started	MPG	Minutes per game
FG%	Field-goal percentage	3P%	3-point field-goal percentage	FT%	Free-throw percentage
RPG	Rebounds per game	APG	Assists per game	SPG	Steals per game
BPG	Blocks per game	PPG	Points per game	PIR	Performance index rating
**Bold**	Career high

=== EuroLeague ===
Year	Team	GP	GS	MPG	FG%	3P%	FT%	RPG	APG	SPG	BPG	PPG	PIR
2019–20	Real Madrid	3	1	4.0	**.750**	—	.000	.7	.0	**.3**	.0	2.0	1.3
2024–25	Partizan	**12**	**3**	**8.7**	.455	**.250**	**1.000**	**1.0**	**.2**	.2	**.1**	**2.1**	**2.0**
Career		15	4	7.6	.633	.250	.500	.9	.2	.3	.1	2.1	1.0
