= 2019–20 Valencia Basket season =

Valencia Basket
2019–20 season
- Owner: Juan Roig
- Head coach: Jaume Ponsarnau
- Arena: La Fonteta
- Liga ACB: 7th (Note: Regular season was cancelled due to the COVID-19 pandemic.)
- Playoffs: Semifinalist
- EuroLeague: 10th (Note: Season was cancelled due to the COVID-19 pandemic.)
- Copa del Rey: Semifinalist
- Supercopa: Semifinalist
- Highest home attendance: Liga ACB: 7,783; Valencia 98–91 Tenerife (29 December 2019) EuroLeague: 7,840; Valencia 76–77 Barcelona (5 February 2020)
- Lowest home attendance: Liga ACB: 6,678; Valencia 95–72 Real Betis (6 October 2019) EuroLeague: 6,954; Valencia 94–90 Zenit (19 November 2019)
- Average home attendance: Liga ACB: 7,096; EuroLeague: 7,433
- Biggest win: Burgos 62–99 Valencia (26 October 2019)
- Biggest defeat: Olympiacos 89–63 Valencia (11 October 2019)
Home	Away	Third

The 2019–20 season was Valencia Basket's 34th in existence and the club's 24th consecutive season in the top flight of Spanish basketball and the fifth season in the EuroLeague. It was the second consecutive season under head coach Jaume Ponsarnau.

Times up to 26 October 2019 and from 29 March 2020 were CEST (UTC+2). Times from 27 October 2019 to 28 March 2020 were CET (UTC+1).

== Players ==
=== Squad information ===
Note: Flags indicate national team eligibility at FIBA-sanctioned events. Players may hold other non-FIBA nationalities not displayed.

Valencia Basket roster
Players
Coaches

Pos.	No.	Nat.	Name	Ht.	Age
SF	6	(Spain)	Abalde, Alberto	2.02 m (6 ft 8 in)	29 – 15 December 1995
PG	1	(Spain)	Colom, Quino	1.88 m (6 ft 2 in)	36 – 1 November 1988
SF	42	(Canada)	Doornekamp, Aaron	2.01 m (6 ft 7 in)	39 – 5 December 1985
C	14	(Montenegro)	Dubljević, Bojan (C)	2.05 m (6 ft 9 in)	33 – 24 October 1991
PF	7	(France)	Labeyrie, Louis	2.08 m (6 ft 10 in)	33 – 11 February 1992
SG	3	(United States)	Loyd, Jordan	1.93 m (6 ft 4 in)	32 – 27 July 1993
SG	2	(Serbia)	Marinković, Vanja	1.98 m (6 ft 6 in)	28 – 9 January 1997
PF	12	(Australia)	Motum, Brock	2.08 m (6 ft 10 in)	34 – 16 October 1990
PF	5	(Senegal)	Ndour, Maurice	2.06 m (6 ft 9 in)	33 – 18 June 1992
SF	19	(Spain)	San Emeterio, Fernando	1.99 m (6 ft 6 in)	41 – 1 January 1984
SG	30	(Spain)	Sastre, Joan	2.01 m (6 ft 7 in)	33 – 10 December 1991
C	10	(United States)	Tobey, Mike	2.13 m (7 ft 0 in)	31 – 10 October 1994
PG	9	(Belgium)	Van Rossom, Sam	1.88 m (6 ft 2 in)	39 – 3 June 1986
PG	16	(Spain)	Vives, Guillem	1.92 m (6 ft 4 in)	32 – 16 September 1993

Head coach

- (Spain) Jaume Ponsarnau

Legend

- (C) Team captain
- Injured

- Roster

=== Transactions ===
==== In ====
No.	Pos.	Nat.	Name	Age	Moving from		Type	Ends	Date	Source
51	C	(Iceland)	Tryggvi Hlinason	21	Monbus Obradoiro	(Spain)	Loan return	June 2021	16 June 2019	
1	PG	(Spain)	Sergi García	22	Baxi Manresa	(Spain)	Loan return	June 2021	1 July 2019	
12	PF	(Australia)	Brock Motum	28	Anadolu Efes	(Turkey)	End of contract	June 2021	2 July 2019	
1	PG	(Spain)	Quino Colom	30	Bahçeşehir Koleji	(Turkey)	End of contract	June 2021	14 July 2019	
5	PF	(Senegal)	Maurice Ndour	27	UNICS	(Russia)	End of contract	June 2020	16 July 2019	
2	SG	(Serbia)	Vanja Marinković	22	Partizan NIS	(Serbia)	Transfer	June 2021	23 July 2019	
3	SG	(United States)	Jordan Loyd	26	Toronto Raptors	(Canada)	End of contract	June 2020	5 August 2019	

==== Out ====
No.	Pos.	Nat.	Name	Age	Moving to		Type	Date	Source
17	SG	(Spain)	Rafa Martínez	37	RETAbet Bilbao Basket	(Spain)	End of contract	13 June 2019	
51	C	(Iceland)	Tryggvi Hlinason	21	Casademont Zaragoza	(Spain)	Transfer	16 June 2019	
8	PG	(France)	Antoine Diot	30	LDLC ASVEL	(France)	End of contract	28 June 2019	
21	SG	(United States)	Matt Thomas	24	Toronto Raptors	(Canada)	Transfer	19 July 2019	
1	PG	(Spain)	Sergi García	22	Rasta Vechta	(Germany)	Loan	24 July 2019	
0	PF	(United States)	Will Thomas	33	Zenit Saint Petersburg	(Russia)	End of contract	7 August 2019	
1	PG	(Spain)	Sergi García	22	Kirolbet Baskonia	(Spain)	Transfer	5 December 2019	

== Pre-season and friendlies ==
=== Friendly matches ===
30 August 2019	TAU Castelló	48–81	Valencia Basket	Castellón de la Plana
20:45	Scoring by quarter: 14–24, 12–22, 15–11, 7–24
	Pts: Gatell 16; Rebs: van Zegeren 9 Asts: Faner 5 PIR: Gatell 13	Boxscore	Pts: Doornekamp, Marinković 12; Rebs: Tobey 10; Asts: Van Rossom 6 PIR: Tobey, Van Rossom 15	Arena: Ciutat de Castelló; Attendance: 2,250; Referees: José Antonio Martín Bertrán, Arnau Padrós, Òscar Perea

7 September 2019	LDLC ASVEL	60–88	Valencia Basket	Alicante
18:30	Scoring by quarter: 17–20, 15–21, 13–23, 15–24
	Pts: Lighty, Payne 10; Rebs: Payne 6 Asts: Jackson 3 PIR: Payne 14	Boxscore	Pts: Tobey 17; Rebs: Tobey 6 Asts: Vives 8 PIR: Tobey, Vives 19	Arena: Pedro Ferrándiz; Referees: Fernando Calatrava, Martín Caballero, Alfonso Olivares

=== Trofeo Feria Ciudad de Albacete ===
12 September 2019	UCAM Murcia	70–87	Valencia Basket	Albacete
21:00	Scoring by quarter: 14–33, 28–20, 12–15, 16–19
	Pts: Townes 14; Rebs: Townes 5 Asts: three players 1 PIR: Lecomte 16	Boxscore	Pts: Loyd 19; Rebs: Loyd 5 Asts: Tobey 3 PIR: Loyd 25	Arena: Pabellón del Parque; Attendance: 600; Referees: Rafael Serrano, Raúl Zamorano, Carlos Marino

=== Trofeo Ciutat de València ===
15 September 2019	Valencia Basket	81–90	San Pablo Burgos	Valencia
19:00	Scoring by quarter: 21–21, 15–30, 24–13, 21–16
	Pts: Dubljević 12; Rebs: Tobey 7 Asts: Loyd 5 PIR: Doornekamp 16	Boxscore	Pts: McFadden 19; Rebs: Huskić 8 Asts: Fitipaldo 9 PIR: McFadden 24	Arena: La Fonteta; Attendance: 6,990; Referees: Fernando Calatrava, Martín Caballero, Raúl Zamorano

== Competitions ==
=== Overview ===
Competition	First match	Last match	Starting round	Final position	Record							
Competition	First match	Last match	Starting round	Final position	Pld	W	D	L	PF	PA	PD	Win %
Liga ACB	26 September 2019	28 June 2020	Round 1	Semifinalist	29	16	0	13	2,483	2,280	+203	55.17
EuroLeague	4 October 2019	5 March 2020	Round 1	10th	28	12	0	16	2,284	2,305	−21	42.86
Copa del Rey	13 February 2020	15 February 2020	Quarterfinals	Semifinalist	2	1	0	1	150	169	−19	50.00
Supercopa de España	21 September 2019		Semifinals	Semifinalist	1	0	0	1	65	71	−6	0.00
Total					60	29	0	31	4,982	4,825	+157	48.33

Source: Competitions

=== Liga ACB ===
==== League table ====
Pos	Team	Pld	W	L	PF	PA	PD	Qualification
5	RETAbet Bilbao Basket	23	14	9	1906	1908	−2	Qualification to playoffs
6	MoraBanc Andorra	23	13	10	1865	1814	+51	Qualification to playoffs
7	Valencia Basket	23	12	11	1950	1794	+156	Qualification to playoffs
8	Kirolbet Baskonia	23	12	11	1926	1886	+40	Qualification to playoffs
9	Unicaja	23	12	11	1823	1798	+25	Qualification to playoffs

Source: ACB

==== Results summary ====
Overall						Home					Away				
Pld	W	L	PF	PA	PD	W	L	PF	PA	PD	W	L	PF	PA	PD
23	12	11	1950	1794	+156	9	3	1043	890	+153	3	8	907	904	+3

Source: Competitive matches

==== Results by round ====
Round	1	2	3	4	5	6	7	8	9	10	11	12	13	14	15	16	17	18	19	20	21	22	23	24	25	26	27	28	29	30	31	32	33	34
Ground	H	A	H	A	H	A	H	A	H	A	H	A	H	A	H	A	H	H	A	H	A	H	A	H	A	A	H	H	A	A	H	A	H	A
Result	W	L	W	L	L	W	L	L	W	L	W	W	W	L	W	L	W	W	L	L	W	W	L	V	V	V	V	V	V	V	V	V	V	V
Position	2	6	3	6	10	6	8	13	10	12	9	8	5	6	5	8	6	6	7	8	7	6	7											

Source: Competitive matches
A = Away; H = Home; W = Win; L = Loss; V = Void

==== Matches ====
26 September 2019 1	Valencia Basket	89–68	MoraBanc Andorra	Valencia
20:00	Scoring by quarter: 25–18, 22–9, 19–17, 23–24
	Pts: Labeyrie, Loyd 13; Rebs: Tobey 7 Asts: Van Rossom 6 PIR: Labeyrie 21	Boxscore	Pts: three players 10; Rebs: Llovet 7 Asts: three players 2 PIR: Diagne 15	Arena: La Fonteta; Attendance: 7,212; Referees: Miguel Ángel Pérez Pérez, Juan de Dios Oyón, Jacobo Rial

29 September 2019 2	RETAbet Bilbao Basket	83–79	Valencia Basket	Bilbao
12:30	Scoring by quarter: 28–18, 25–16, 18–23, 12–22
	Pts: Martínez 16; Rebs: Kulboka 6 Asts: Rousselle 6 PIR: Martínez 22	Boxscore	Pts: Vives 15; Rebs: Tobey 9 Asts: Van Rossom 4 PIR: Motum 16	Arena: Bilbao Arena; Attendance: 7,333; Referees: Carlos Peruga, Rafael Serrano, Cristóbal Sánchez

6 October 2019 3	Valencia Basket	95–72	Coosur Real Betis	Valencia
17:00	Scoring by quarter: 26–12, 18–23, 26–22, 25–15
	Pts: Dubljević, Motum 14; Rebs: Dubljević, Labeyrie 10; Asts: Van Rossom 7 PIR: Dubljević 22	Boxscore	Pts: Slaughter 13; Rebs: Whittington 7 Asts: three players 3 PIR: Slaughter 11	Arena: La Fonteta; Attendance: 6,678; Referees: Emilio Pérez Pizarro, José Ramón García Ortiz, Vicente Martínez

13 October 2019 4	Barça	97–94	Valencia Basket	Barcelona
18:30	Scoring by quarter: 27–23, 25–23, 22–26, 23–22
	Pts: Mirotić 33; Rebs: Mirotić 5 Asts: Mirotić 6 PIR: Mirotić 43	Boxscore	Pts: Loyd 30; Rebs: Dubljević 7 Asts: Vives 4 PIR: Loyd 37	Arena: Palau Blaugrana; Attendance: 6,998; Referees: Antonio Conde, Alberto Sánchez, Arnau Padrós

20 October 2019 5	Valencia Basket	63–79	Unicaja	Valencia
18:30	Scoring by quarter: 15–20, 23–28, 15–18, 10–13
	Pts: Doornekamp 11; Rebs: Dubljević 10; Asts: Van Rossom 5 PIR: Dubljević 14	Boxscore	Pts: Fernández, Thompson 12; Rebs: Suárez 8 Asts: Adams, Suárez 5 PIR: Suárez 18	Arena: La Fonteta; Attendance: 7,327; Referees: Daniel Hierrezuelo, Óscar Perea, Esperanza Mendoza

26 October 2019 6	San Pablo Burgos	62–93	Valencia Basket	Burgos
20:30	Scoring by quarter: 16–15, 13–27, 16–26, 17–25
	Pts: Bassas 11; Rebs: Tokoto 8 Asts: three players 2 PIR: Tokoto 13	Boxscore	Pts: Motum 14; Rebs: Labeyrie 8 Asts: Colom 6 PIR: Colom 22	Arena: Coliseum Burgos; Attendance: 9,309; Referees: Fernando Calatrava, Rafael Serrano, Alfonso Olivares

3 November 2019 7	Valencia Basket	86–88(OT)	Herbalife Gran Canaria	Valencia
20:30	Scoring by quarter: 23–20, 20–17, 22–20, 6–14, Overtime: 15–17
	Pts: Loyd 17; Rebs: Dubljević 7 Asts: Colom 7 PIR: San Emeterio 21	Boxscore	Pts: Cook 24; Rebs: Costello 9 Asts: Cook 8 PIR: Cook 34	Arena: La Fonteta; Attendance: 7,034; Referees: Emilio Pérez Pizarro, Vicente Bultó, Yasmina Alcaraz

10 November 2019 8	UCAM Murcia	97–95(OT)	Valencia Basket	Murcia
20:00	Scoring by quarter: 24–13, 22–21, 14–27, 21–20, Overtime: 16–14
	Pts: Booker, Eddie 24; Rebs: Rojas 9 Asts: Booker 9 PIR: Eddie 26	Boxscore	Pts: Dubljević 20; Rebs: Dubljević 9 Asts: Loyd 6 PIR: Dubljević 23	Arena: Palacio de Deportes; Attendance: 5,399; Referees: Carlos Peruga, Óscar Perea, Alberto Baena

17 November 2019 9	Valencia Basket	92–74	Casademont Zaragoza	Valencia
17:00	Scoring by quarter: 25–11, 28–18, 24–22, 15–23
	Pts: Abalde 19; Rebs: Ndour, Tobey 8 Asts: Dubljević 5 PIR: Abalde 22	Boxscore	Pts: Barreiro, Benzing 12; Rebs: Radović 6 Asts: Alocén, Brussino 4 PIR: Barreiro 14	Arena: La Fonteta; Attendance: 7,079; Referees: Juan Carlos García González, Francisco José Araña, Iyán González

24 November 2019 10	Kirolbet Baskonia	85–74	Valencia Basket	Vitoria-Gasteiz
18:30	Scoring by quarter: 19–19, 19–13, 33–20, 14–22
	Pts: Shields 17; Rebs: Shields 9 Asts: Henry 5 PIR: Shields 24	Boxscore	Pts: Loyd 20; Rebs: Dubljević 6 Asts: Vives 4 PIR: Dubljević 20	Arena: Buesa Arena; Attendance: 9,335; Referees: Daniel Hierrezuelo, José Ramón García Ortiz, Martín Caballero

30 November 2019 11	Valencia Basket	86–76	Monbus Obradoiro	Valencia
18:00	Scoring by quarter: 21–22, 18–15, 21–16, 26–23
	Pts: Loyd 16; Rebs: Dubljević 8 Asts: Colom, Dubljević 4 PIR: three players 18	Boxscore	Pts: Kravić 21; Rebs: Kravić 15; Asts: Kravić 4 PIR: Kravić 38	Arena: La Fonteta; Attendance: 6,781; Referees: José Antonio Martín Bertrán, Sergio Manuel, Jacobo Rial

7 December 2019 12	Montakit Fuenlabrada	70–81	Valencia Basket	Fuenlabrada
18:00	Scoring by quarter: 19–18, 16–10, 10–26, 25–27
	Pts: Bellas 14; Rebs: Gillet 9 Asts: Bellas 5 PIR: Mockevičius 21	Boxscore	Pts: Loyd 14; Rebs: Tobey 5 Asts: Colom 4 PIR: Loyd 17	Arena: Fernando Martín; Attendance: 5,356; Referees: Juan Carlos García González, Luis Castillo, Alfonso Olivares

15 December 2019 13	Valencia Basket	79–63	Movistar Estudiantes	Valencia
20:00	Scoring by quarter: 16–15, 15–17, 25–14, 23–17
	Pts: Loyd 13; Rebs: Labeyrie 12; Asts: Colom 4 PIR: Labeyrie 18	Boxscore	Pts: Kadji 16; Rebs: Kadji 6 Asts: Scrubb 7 PIR: Kadji 20	Arena: La Fonteta; Attendance: 6,937; Referees: Carlos Cortés, Martín Caballero, Roberto Lucas

22 December 2019 14	Baxi Manresa	79–76	Valencia Basket	Manresa
12:30	Scoring by quarter: 31–14, 13–20, 16–14, 19–28
	Pts: Magarity 16; Rebs: Báez, Vaulet 5 Asts: Pérez 11; PIR: Pérez 24	Boxscore	Pts: Loyd 20; Rebs: Labeyrie 6 Asts: Doornekamp, Van Rossom 3 PIR: Loyd 20	Arena: Nou Congost; Attendance: 4,925; Referees: Antonio Conde, Francisco José Araña, Jorge Martínez

29 December 2019 15	Valencia Basket	98–91	Iberostar Tenerife	Valencia
20:00	Scoring by quarter: 22–23, 25–22, 28–20, 23–26
	Pts: Dubljević 21; Rebs: Dubljević 8 Asts: three players 4 PIR: Dubljević 29	Boxscore	Pts: Shermadini 17; Rebs: Díez, Shermadini 5 Asts: Huertas 14; PIR: Huertas 24	Arena: La Fonteta; Attendance: 7,783; Referees: Emilio Pérez Pizarro, Sergio Manuel, Vicente Martínez

6 January 2020 16	Real Madrid	85–78(OT)	Valencia Basket	Madrid
18:30	Scoring by quarter: 26–19, 14–21, 16–27, 20–9, Overtime: 9–2
	Pts: Fernández 22; Rebs: Tavares 7 Asts: Campazzo 8 PIR: Fernández 21	Boxscore	Pts: Abalde 16; Rebs: Dubljević 11; Asts: Loyd, Van Rossom 4 PIR: Abalde 16	Arena: WiZink Center; Attendance: 7,256; Referees: José Antonio Martín Bertrán, Luis Castillo, Iyán González

12 January 2020 17	Valencia Basket	100–70	Club Joventut Badalona	Valencia
20:00	Scoring by quarter: 21–16, 27–21, 26–15, 26–18
	Pts: Labeyrie 13; Rebs: Doornekamp 6 Asts: Van Rossom 6 PIR: Labeyrie 16	Boxscore	Pts: Kanter 14; Rebs: three players 4 Asts: Zisis 4 PIR: Kanter 14	Arena: La Fonteta; Attendance: 7,290; Referees: Miguel Ángel Pérez Pérez, Juan de Dios Oyón, Raúl Zamorano

19 January 2020 18	Valencia Basket	82–62	UCAM Murcia	Valencia
20:00	Scoring by quarter: 21–13, 23–17, 21–18, 17–14
	Pts: Labeyrie 16; Rebs: Dubljević 9 Asts: Colom 4 PIR: Labeyrie 20	Boxscore	Pts: Booker 14; Rebs: Larentzakis, Radončić 6 Asts: Larentzakis 7 PIR: Larentzakis 16	Arena: La Fonteta; Attendance: 6,963; Referees: Juan Carlos García González, Jorge Martínez, Jacobo Rial

26 January 2020 19	Monbus Obradoiro	86–83	Valencia Basket	Santiago de Compostela
20:00	Scoring by quarter: 21–15, 23–27, 17–26, 25–15
	Pts: Daum 16; Rebs: Kravić 6 Asts: four players 4 PIR: Czerapowicz 21	Boxscore	Pts: San Emeterio 20; Rebs: Dubljević 7 Asts: Van Rossom 3 PIR: San Emeterio 21	Arena: Multiusos Fontes do Sar; Attendance: 5,329; Referees: Jordi Aliaga, Rafael Serrano, Cristóbal Sánchez

2 February 2020 20	Valencia Basket	78–81	RETAbet Bilbao Basket	Valencia
20:00	Scoring by quarter: 20–19, 11–19, 21–21, 26–22
	Pts: Dubljević 20; Rebs: Abalde, Labeyrie 7 Asts: Vives 4 PIR: Abalde 22	Boxscore	Pts: Bouteille 24; Rebs: Balvín 8 Asts: Schreiner 9 PIR: Bouteille 22	Arena: La Fonteta; Attendance: 7,288; Referees: Daniel Hierrezuelo, Francisco José Araña, Joaquín García

9 February 2020 21	Movistar Estudiantes	73–77	Valencia Basket	Madrid
20:00	Scoring by quarter: 11–21, 21–20, 22–17, 19–19
	Pts: Avramović 15; Rebs: Dangubić, Vicedo 6 Asts: Pressey 8 PIR: Vicedo 16	Boxscore	Pts: Dubljević 18; Rebs: Dubljević 9 Asts: three players 3 PIR: Dubljević 26	Arena: WiZink Center; Attendance: 8,763; Referees: Óscar Perea, Vicente Bultó, Javier Torres

1 March 2020 22	Valencia Basket	95–66	San Pablo Burgos	Valencia
20:00	Scoring by quarter: 15–16, 28–15, 28–14, 24–21
	Pts: Abalde 15; Rebs: Abalde 8 Asts: Colom 4 PIR: Abalde 27	Boxscore	Pts: Fitipaldo 13; Rebs: Clark 8 Asts: Bassas, Fitipaldo 5 PIR: Fitipaldo 13	Arena: La Fonteta; Attendance: 6,785; Referees: Miguel Ángel Pérez Pérez, Jorge Martínez, Arnau Padros

8 March 2020 23	Herbalife Gran Canaria	87–77	Valencia Basket	Las Palmas
13:00	Scoring by quarter: 16–11, 19–18, 24–20, 28–28
	Pts: Shurna 23; Rebs: Costello 11; Asts: Cook 11; PIR: Costello 23	Boxscore	Pts: Doornekamp 19; Rebs: Labeyrie 7 Asts: four players 2 PIR: Marinković 20	Arena: Gran Canaria Arena; Attendance: 5,517; Referees: Carlos Cortés, Jordi Aliaga, Raúl Zamorano

24	Valencia Basket	vs.	Kirolbet Baskonia	Valencia
		Boxscore		Arena: La Fonteta

25	Iberostar Tenerife	vs.	Valencia Basket	San Cristóbal de La Laguna
		Boxscore		Arena: Santiago Martín

26	Club Joventut Badalona	vs.	Valencia Basket	Badalona
		Boxscore		Arena: Palau Municipal d'Esports

27	Valencia Basket	vs.	Baxi Manresa	Valencia
		Boxscore		Arena: La Fonteta

28	Valencia Basket	vs.	Barça	Valencia
		Boxscore		Arena: La Fonteta

29	MoraBanc Andorra	vs.	Valencia Basket	Andorra la Vella
		Boxscore		Arena: M.I. Govern Andorra

30	Casademont Zaragoza	vs.	Valencia Basket	Zaragoza
		Boxscore		Arena: Pabellón Príncipe Felipe

31	Valencia Basket	vs.	Real Madrid	Valencia
		Boxscore		Arena: La Fonteta

32	Unicaja	vs.	Valencia Basket	Málaga
		Boxscore		Arena: Martín Carpena

33	Valencia Basket	vs.	Montakit Fuenlabrada	Valencia
		Boxscore		Arena: La Fonteta

34	Coosur Real Betis	vs.	Valencia Basket	Seville
		Boxscore		Arena: San Pablo

==== Playoffs ====
===== Group stage =====
Pos	Team	Pld	W	L	PF	PA	PD	Qualification
1	Valencia Basket (H)	5	4	1	460	411	+49	Qualification to the semifinals
2	San Pablo Burgos	5	3	2	444	440	+4	Qualification to the semifinals
3	Real Madrid	5	3	2	441	429	+12	
4	Herbalife Gran Canaria	5	2	3	425	448	−23	
5	MoraBanc Andorra	5	2	3	452	450	+2	
6	Casademont Zaragoza	5	1	4	423	467	−44	

Source: ACB
(H) Hosts

18 June 2020 1	MoraBanc Andorra	74–90	Valencia Basket	Valencia
15:30	Scoring by quarter: 14–22, 27–28, 19–17, 14–23
	Pts: Jelínek 11; Rebs: Todorović 7 Asts: Hannah 6 PIR: Senglin 12	Boxscore	Pts: Abalde 17; Rebs: Tobey 13; Asts: Van Rossom 7 PIR: Tobey 27	Arena: La Fonteta; Referees: Miguel Ángel Pérez Pérez, Luis Miguel Castillo, Javier Torres

20 June 2020 2	Valencia Basket	89–71	Casademont Zaragoza	Valencia
21:30	Scoring by quarter: 15–20, 20–25, 24–10, 30–16
	Pts: Tobey 17; Rebs: Tobey 11; Asts: Van Rossom 5 PIR: Tobey 24	Boxscore	Pts: three players 14; Rebs: Radović 4 Asts: three players 4 PIR: Alocén, Ennis 17	Arena: La Fonteta; Referees: Daniel Hierrezuelo, Jordi Aliaga, Juan de Dios Oyón

22 June 2020 3	Real Madrid	95–90	Valencia Basket	Valencia
18:30	Scoring by quarter: 31–21, 25–31, 18–19, 21–19
	Pts: Campazzo 29; Rebs: Tavares 9 Asts: Campazzo 11; PIR: Campazzo 42	Boxscore	Pts: Abalde 17; Rebs: Loyd, Tobey 6 Asts: Colom 4 PIR: Abalde 21	Arena: La Fonteta; Referees: Emilio Pérez Pizarro, Fernando Calatrava, Arnau Padros

24 June 2020 4	Valencia Basket	94–90	San Pablo Burgos	Valencia
21:30	Scoring by quarter: 20–27, 19–24, 19–16, 36–23
	Pts: Tobey 21; Rebs: Tobey 13; Asts: Van Rossom 7 PIR: Tobey 28	Boxscore	Pts: Fitipaldo 17; Rebs: Lima 7 Asts: Bassas 9 PIR: Fitipaldo 17	Arena: La Fonteta; Referees: José Antonio Martín Bertrán, Juan Carlos García González, Jordi Aliaga

26 June 2020 5	Herbalife Gran Canaria	81–97	Valencia Basket	Valencia
18:30	Scoring by quarter: 23–29, 21–22, 12–26, 25–20
	Pts: Harper 15; Rebs: Shurna 6 Asts: Cook 8 PIR: Cook, Paulí 19	Boxscore	Pts: Loyd 26; Rebs: Tobey 11; Asts: Colom, Loyd 3 PIR: Loyd 29	Arena: La Fonteta; Referees: Daniel Hierrezuelo, Antonio Conde, Sergio Manuel

===== Semifinals =====
28 June 2020	Valencia Basket	73–75	Kirolbet Baskonia	Valencia
20:00	Scoring by quarter: 17–12, 25–21, 13–23, 18–19
	Pts: Van Rossom 14; Rebs: Tobey 9 Asts: three players 3 PIR: Tobey, Van Rossom 13	Boxscore	Pts: Dragić 21; Rebs: Polonara, Shields 5 Asts: Henry, Vildoza 4 PIR: Dragić 25	Arena: La Fonteta; Referees: Juan Carlos García González, Carlos Peruga, Fernando Calatrava

=== EuroLeague ===
==== League table ====
Pos	Team	Pld	W	L	PF	PA	PD
8	(Turkey) Fenerbahçe Beko	28	13	15	2153	2188	−35
9	(Lithuania) Žalgiris	28	12	16	2213	2142	+71
10	(Spain) Valencia Basket	28	12	16	2252	2273	−21
11	(Greece) Olympiacos	28	12	16	2243	2282	−39
12	(Italy) A|X Armani Exchange Milan	28	12	16	2163	2236	−73

Source: EuroLeague
Rules for classification: All points scored in extra period(s) were not counted in the standings, nor for any tie-break situation.

==== Results summary ====
Overall						Home					Away				
Pld	W	L	PF	PA	PD	W	L	PF	PA	PD	W	L	PF	PA	PD
28	12	16	2252	2273	−21	7	7	1185	1135	+50	5	9	1067	1138	−71

Source: Competitive matches

==== Results by round ====
Round	1	2	3	4	5	6	7	8	9	10	11	12	13	14	15	16	17	18	19	20	21	22	23	24	25	26	27	28	29	30	31	32	33	34
Ground	H	A	H	A	A	H	A	H	H	H	A	A	A	H	A	A	H	H	A	A	A	H	H	A	H	H	A	H	A	H	H	A	A	H
Result	L	L	L	L	L	W	L	W	W	W	L	L	W	W	L	W	W	L	W	W	L	W	L	W	L	L	L	L	V	V	V	V	V	V
Position	18	18	18	18	18	18	18	16	15	13	14	15	14	10	11	10	10	10	9	7	7	7	8	7	7	8	10	10						

Source: Competitive matches
A = Away; H = Home; W = Win; L = Loss; V = Void

==== Matches ====
4 October 2019 1	Valencia Basket (Spain)	71–96	(Russia) CSKA Moscow	Valencia
21:00	Scoring by quarter: 17–24, 21–26, 16–26, 17–20
	Pts: Tobey 14; Rebs: Tobey 6 Asts: Vives 5 PIR: Tobey 18	Boxscore	Pts: Hilliard 22; Rebs: Bolomboy, Hackett 6 Asts: Hackett, James 5 PIR: James 28	Arena: La Fonteta; Attendance: 7,390; Referees: Luigi Lamonica, Jakub Zamojski, Robert Vyklický

11 October 2019 2	Olympiacos (Greece)	89–63	(Spain) Valencia Basket	Piraeus
20:30	Scoring by quarter: 31–22, 23–8, 18–14, 17–19
	Pts: Milutinov, Spanoulis 17; Rebs: Milutinov 14; Asts: Spanoulis 6 PIR: Milutinov 29	Boxscore	Pts: Loyd 12; Rebs: Abalde, Dubljević 4 Asts: Van Rossom 4 PIR: Motum 12	Arena: Peace and Friendship Stadium; Attendance: 6,617; Referees: Matej Boltauzer, Petri Mäntylä (Finland), Joseph Bissang

18 October 2019 3	Valencia Basket (Spain)	78–83	(Turkey) Anadolu Efes	Valencia
21:00	Scoring by quarter: 27–23, 19–16, 17–30, 15–14
	Pts: Dubljević 22; Rebs: Dubljević 7 Asts: Van Rossom 5 PIR: Dubljević 27	Boxscore	Pts: Simon 19; Rebs: Dunston, Peters 7 Asts: Micić 12; PIR: Micić 26	Arena: La Fonteta; Attendance: 7,205; Referees: Christos Christodoulou, Anne Panther, Michele Rossi

24 October 2019 4	Maccabi Tel Aviv (Israel)	76–63	(Spain) Valencia Basket	Tel Aviv
20:05	Scoring by quarter: 18–11, 15–17, 23–16, 20–19
	Pts: Wilbekin 14; Rebs: Hunter 8 Asts: Wolters 9 PIR: Casspi 19	Boxscore	Pts: Loyd 17; Rebs: Labeyrie 8 Asts: four players 2 PIR: Dubljević, San Emeterio 22	Arena: Menora Mivtachim Arena; Attendance: 10,511; Referees: Robert Lottermoser, Mario Majkić, Igor Dragojević

30 October 2019 5	Barcelona (Spain)	83–77	(Spain) Valencia Basket	Barcelona
21:00	Scoring by quarter: 21–19, 23–22, 18–24, 21–12
	Pts: Higgins 20; Rebs: Davies, Mirotić 7 Asts: Hanga 6 PIR: Mirotić 23	Boxscore	Pts: Loyd 17; Rebs: Dubljević 10; Asts: Colom 3 PIR: Dubljević 24	Arena: Palau Blaugrana; Attendance: 5,734; Referees: Saša Pukl, Mehdi Difallah, Ioannis Foufis

1 November 2019 6	Valencia Basket (Spain)	81–72	(France) LDLC ASVEL	Valencia
19:00	Scoring by quarter: 16–18, 19–18, 21–16, 25–20
	Pts: Dubljević 13; Rebs: Dubljević 8 Asts: Colom 6 PIR: Vives 17	Boxscore	Pts: Jean-Charles 20; Rebs: Jekiri 9 Asts: Diot 6 PIR: Jean-Charles 24	Arena: La Fonteta; Attendance: 7,399; Referees: Borys Ryzhyk, Gytis Vilius, Marko Juras

8 November 2019 7	Panathinaikos OPAP (Greece)	91–80	(Spain) Valencia Basket	Athens
20:30	Scoring by quarter: 26–18, 19–17, 23–29, 23–16
	Pts: Thomas 19; Rebs: Calathes 12; Asts: Calathes 9 PIR: Thomas 23	Boxscore	Pts: Loyd 27; Rebs: Dubljević, Loyd 5 Asts: Loyd 8 PIR: Loyd 41	Arena: O.A.K.A. Attendance: 9,130; Referees: Oļegs Latiševs, Milivoje Jovčić, Miloš Koljenšić

15 November 2019 8	Valencia Basket (Spain)	82–56	(Germany) Bayern Munich	Valencia
21:00	Scoring by quarter: 20–16, 19–13, 20–18, 23–9
	Pts: Marinković 19; Rebs: Dubljević 7 Asts: Colom, Loyd 4 PIR: Motum 18	Boxscore	Pts: Lučić 14; Rebs: Radošević 4 Asts: three players 2 PIR: Lučić 13	Arena: La Fonteta; Attendance: 7,166; Referees: Christos Christodoulou, Sérgio Silva, Michele Rossi

19 November 2019 9	Valencia Basket (Spain)	94–90	(Russia) Zenit Saint Petersburg	Valencia
21:00	Scoring by quarter: 15–16, 18–22, 24–25, 37–27
	Pts: Abalde 18; Rebs: Dubljević 11; Asts: Colom 7 PIR: Abalde 20	Boxscore	Pts: Renfroe, Thomas 17; Rebs: Iverson, Renfroe 5 Asts: Renfroe 6 PIR: Renfroe 27	Arena: La Fonteta; Attendance: 6,954 (tentative); Referees: Sreten Radović, Joseph Bissang, Igor Dragojević

21 November 2019 10	Valencia Basket (Spain)	89–84	(Russia) Khimki	Valencia
21:00	Scoring by quarter: 26–33, 25–15, 21–22, 17–14
	Pts: Dubljević 18; Rebs: Tobey 10; Asts: Colom 11; PIR: Dubljević 29	Boxscore	Pts: Jović 19; Rebs: Booker 10; Asts: Jović 11; PIR: Jović 33	Arena: La Fonteta; Attendance: 7,023; Referees: Luigi Lamonica, Sašo Petek, Tomasz Trawicki

28 November 2019 11	Crvena zvezda mts (Serbia)	76–73	(Spain) Valencia Basket	Belgrade
19:00	Scoring by quarter: 17–19, 20–22, 23–10, 16–22
	Pts: L. Brown 19; Rebs: Faye 8 Asts: L. Brown 6 PIR: L. Brown 21	Boxscore	Pts: Dubljević 22; Rebs: Dubljević 8 Asts: three players 3 PIR: Dubljević 29	Arena: Aleksandar Nikolić Hall; Attendance: 6,087; Referees: Spiros Gkontas, Petri Mäntylä (Finland), Jakub Zamojski

5 December 2019 12	Real Madrid (Spain)	111–99	(Spain) Valencia Basket	Madrid
21:00	Scoring by quarter: 30–29, 23–20, 27–21, 31–29
	Pts: Randolph 18; Rebs: Thompkins 6 Asts: Campazzo 17; PIR: Randolph 28	Boxscore	Pts: Loyd 21; Rebs: Dubljević, Labeyrie 6 Asts: Loyd 5 PIR: Loyd 25	Arena: WiZink Center; Attendance: 8,956; Referees: Ilija Belošević, Carmelo Paternicò, Seffi Shemmesh

13 December 2019 13	Žalgiris (Lithuania)	82–86	(Spain) Valencia Basket	Kaunas
19:00	Scoring by quarter: 21–19, 27–28, 9–17, 25–22
	Pts: Ulanovas 16; Rebs: Landale 4 Asts: Walkup 7 PIR: Lekavičius, Walkup 15	Boxscore	Pts: Labeyrie 22; Rebs: Abalde, Labeyrie 5 Asts: Colom 9 PIR: Colom, Labeyrie 22	Arena: Žalgirio Arena; Attendance: 14,752; Referees: Robert Lottermoser, Matej Boltauzer, Aare Halliko

17 December 2019 14	Valencia Basket (Spain)	105–77	(Spain) Kirolbet Baskonia	Valencia
21:00	Scoring by quarter: 19–19, 27–17, 23–22, 36–19
	Pts: Dubljević 25; Rebs: Dubljević 5 Asts: Colom 6 PIR: Dubljević 25	Boxscore	Pts: Shields 22; Rebs: Shengelia 8 Asts: Henry 5 PIR: Shields 25	Arena: La Fonteta; Attendance: 7,697; Referees: Milivoje Jovčić, Damir Javor, Ingus Baumanis

19 December 2019 15	A|X Armani Exchange Milan (Italy)	78–71	(Spain) Valencia Basket	Assago
20:45	Scoring by quarter: 26–24, 17–19, 19–10, 16–18
	Pts: Della Valle 15; Rebs: Tarczewski 10; Asts: Rodríguez 8 PIR: Tarczewski 22	Boxscore	Pts: Dubljević 20; Rebs: Dubljević, Tobey 6 Asts: Colom 6 PIR: Dubljević 21	Arena: Mediolanum Forum; Attendance: 7,531; Referees: Borys Ryzhyk, Oļegs Latiševs, Miloš Koljenšić

27 December 2019 16	Fenerbahçe Beko (Turkey)	98–100(OT)	(Spain) Valencia Basket	Istanbul
18:45	Scoring by quarter: 24–22, 24–18, 22–19, 14–25, Overtime: 14–16
	Pts: de Colo 31; Rebs: de Colo 7 Asts: Sloukas 9 PIR: de Colo 37	Boxscore	Pts: Dubljević 30; Rebs: Dubljević 12; Asts: Abalde, Van Rossom 5 PIR: Dubljević 42	Arena: Ülker Sports and Event Hall; Attendance: 8,211; Referees: Luigi Lamonica, Elias Koromilas, Saulius Racys

3 January 2020 17	Valencia Basket (Spain)	91–77	(Germany) ALBA Berlin	Valencia
21:00	Scoring by quarter: 18–27, 19–15, 25–15, 29–20
	Pts: Loyd 19; Rebs: Dubljević 10; Asts: Van Rossom 11; PIR: Abalde 22	Boxscore	Pts: Eriksson 14; Rebs: Nnoko 8 Asts: Sikma 6 PIR: Nnoko 16	Arena: La Fonteta; Attendance: 7,809; Referees: Sreten Radović, Sašo Petek, Eduard Udyanskyy

10 January 2020 18	Valencia Basket (Spain)	91–93	(Greece) Olympiacos	Valencia
21:00	Scoring by quarter: 16–16, 20–23, 27–31, 28–23
	Pts: San Emeterio 23; Rebs: Dubljević 9 Asts: three players 2 PIR: Marinković 26	Boxscore	Pts: Printezis 18; Rebs: Printezis, Vezenkov 7 Asts: Spanoulis 8 PIR: Printezis 26	Arena: La Fonteta; Attendance: 7,142; Referees: Ilija Belošević, Seffi Shemmesh, Hugues Thépénier

14 January 2020 19	Khimki (Russia)	75–84	(Spain) Valencia Basket	Mytishchi
18:00	Scoring by quarter: 23–29, 24–15, 15–19, 13–21
	Pts: Shved 18; Rebs: Shved 5 Asts: Jović, Shved 5 PIR: Gill 17	Boxscore	Pts: San Emeterio 18; Rebs: Abalde 11; Asts: Van Rossom 7 PIR: San Emeterio 25	Arena: Mytishchi Arena; Attendance: 2,917; Referees: Damir Javor, Tomasz Trawicki, Josip Radojković

17 January 2020 20	Zenit Saint Petersburg (Russia)	81–86	(Spain) Valencia Basket	Saint Petersburg
18:00	Scoring by quarter: 16–20, 26–26, 9–17, 30–23
	Pts: Albicy 18; Rebs: Iverson 7 Asts: Albicy 4 PIR: Albicy 18	Boxscore	Pts: Marinković 14; Rebs: Ndour 5 Asts: Van Rossom 8 PIR: Ndour 23	Arena: Sibur Arena; Attendance: 4,730; Referees: Carmelo Paternicò, Mehdi Difallah, Spiros Gkontas

23 January 2020 21	CSKA Moscow (Russia)	81–70	(Spain) Valencia Basket	Moscow
18:00	Scoring by quarter: 20–17, 22–22, 18–17, 21–14
	Pts: Voigtmann 19; Rebs: Voigtmann 10; Asts: James 5 PIR: Voigtmann 26	Boxscore	Pts: Van Rossom 16; Rebs: Dubljević, Labeyrie 8 Asts: Colom, Doornekamp 4 PIR: Doornekamp, Dubljević 12	Arena: Megasport Arena; Attendance: 6,479; Referees: Saša Pukl, Anne Panther, Sérgio Silva

31 January 2020 22	Valencia Basket (Spain)	94–87	(Greece) Panathinaikos OPAP	Valencia
21:00	Scoring by quarter: 27–25, 28–20, 25–19, 14–23
	Pts: Dubljević 19; Rebs: Dubljević 7 Asts: Colom 6 PIR: Dubljević 26	Boxscore	Pts: Calathes 22; Rebs: Calathes, Papagiannis 10; Asts: Calathes 5 PIR: Calathes 25	Arena: La Fonteta; Attendance: 7,817; Referees: Borys Ryzhyk, Milivoje Jovčić, Gytis Vilius

5 February 2020 23	Valencia Basket (Spain)	76–77	(Spain) Barcelona	Valencia
21:00	Scoring by quarter: 21–18, 22–19, 23–16, 10–24
	Pts: San Emeterio 17; Rebs: Dubljević 13; Asts: four players 3 PIR: San Emeterio 22	Boxscore	Pts: Mirotić 26; Rebs: Claver, Oriola 5 Asts: Hanga 6 PIR: Mirotić 32	Arena: La Fonteta; Attendance: 7,840; Referees: Matej Boltauzer, Fernando Rocha, Hugues Thépénier

7 February 2020 24	Bayern Munich (Germany)	59–66	(Spain) Valencia Basket	Munich
20:30	Scoring by quarter: 13–15, 17–9, 16–21, 13–21
	Pts: Monroe 15; Rebs: Monroe 6 Asts: Šiško 6 PIR: Monroe 15	Boxscore	Pts: Doornekamp, Tobey 11; Rebs: Tobey 6 Asts: Colom 5 PIR: Doornekamp 14	Arena: Audi Dome; Attendance: 4,412; Referees: Luigi Lamonica, Sašo Petek, Josip Radojković

21 February 2020 25	Valencia Basket (Spain)	82–85	(Israel) Maccabi Tel Aviv	Valencia
21:00	Scoring by quarter: 19–18, 19–15, 23–25, 21–27
	Pts: Dubljević 19; Rebs: Tobey 6 Asts: Colom 9 PIR: Dubljević 20	Boxscore	Pts: Wilbekin 20; Rebs: Hunter 9 Asts: Dorsey 5 PIR: Dorsey 25	Arena: La Fonteta; Attendance: 7,807; Referees: Sreten Radović, Mehdi Difallah, Tomasz Trawicki

28 February 2020 26	Valencia Basket (Spain)	86–93	(Turkey) Fenerbahçe Beko	Valencia
21:00	Scoring by quarter: 14–21, 27–26, 19–18, 26–28
	Pts: Marinković 22; Rebs: Tobey 6 Asts: Colom 5 PIR: Marinković 23	Boxscore	Pts: Williams 22; Rebs: Thomas 5 Asts: De Colo 5 PIR: Williams 24	Arena: La Fonteta; Attendance: 7,378; Referees: Oļegs Latiševs, Piotr Pastusiak, Mario Majkić

3 March 2020 27	LDLC ASVEL (France)	72–65	(Spain) Valencia Basket	Villeurbanne
20:45	Scoring by quarter: 20–17, 18–13, 18–22, 16–13
	Pts: Lighty 20; Rebs: Jekiri, Yabusele 7 Asts: Taylor 5 PIR: Taylor 18	Boxscore	Pts: Vives 14; Rebs: Labeyrie 7 Asts: Abalde 5 PIR: Labeyrie 17	Arena: Astroballe; Attendance: 4,491 (tentative); Referees: Robert Lottermoser, Tomislav Hordov, Saulius Racys

5 March 2020 28	Valencia Basket (Spain)	81–83(OT)	(Italy) A|X Armani Exchange Milan	Valencia
21:00	Scoring by quarter: 12–19, 16–17, 20–12, 17–17, Overtime: 16–18
	Pts: Abalde 21; Rebs: three players 6 Asts: Colom 7 PIR: Dubljević 31	Boxscore	Pts: Rodríguez 16; Rebs: Micov 7 Asts: Rodríguez 9 PIR: Rodríguez 20	Arena: La Fonteta; Attendance: 0 (Note: Due to COVID-19 pandemic, Euroleague Basketball decided that there will be no individual admission, including fans, VIPs, journalists or additional club staff.); Referees: Borys Ryzhyk, Damir Javor, Emin Moğulkoç

29	Anadolu Efes (Turkey)	vs.	(Spain) Valencia Basket	Istanbul
		Boxscore		Arena: Sinan Erdem Dome

30	Valencia Basket (Spain)	vs.	(Lithuania) Žalgiris	Valencia
		Boxscore		Arena: La Fonteta

31	Valencia Basket (Spain)	vs.	(Spain) Real Madrid	Valencia
		Boxscore		Arena: La Fonteta

32	ALBA Berlin (Germany)	vs.	(Spain) Valencia Basket	Berlin
		Boxscore		Arena: Mercedes-Benz Arena

33	Kirolbet Baskonia (Spain)	vs.	(Spain) Valencia Basket	Vitoria-Gasteiz
		Boxscore		Arena: Buesa Arena

34	Valencia Basket (Spain)	vs.	(Serbia) Crvena zvezda mts	Valencia
		Boxscore		Arena: La Fonteta

=== Copa del Rey ===
==== Quarterfinals ====
13 February 2020	Barça	78–82	Valencia Basket	Málaga
19:00	Scoring by quarter: 18–19, 20–22, 14–23, 26–18
	Pts: Mirotić 25; Rebs: Mirotić 8 Asts: Delaney 8 PIR: Mirotić 24	Boxscore	Pts: Tobey 16; Rebs: Abalde 9 Asts: Doornekamp, San Emeterio 4 PIR: Tobey 22	Arena: Martín Carpena; Attendance: 9,857; Referees: Emilio Pérez Pizarro, Carlos Cortés, Luis Castillo

==== Semifinals ====
15 February 2020	Real Madrid	91–68	Valencia Basket	Málaga
18:30	Scoring by quarter: 18–11, 16–9, 33–24, 24–24
	Pts: Randolph 16; Rebs: Tavares 10; Asts: Campazzo 9 PIR: Campazzo 31	Boxscore	Pts: Abalde 12; Rebs: Abalde, Dubljević 6 Asts: Colom, Sastre 5 PIR: Abalde 17	Arena: Martín Carpena; Attendance: 10,437; Referees: Daniel Hierrezuelo, Carlos Peruga, Juan de Dios Oyón

=== Supercopa de España ===
==== Semifinals ====
21 September 2019	Barça	71–65	Valencia Basket	Madrid
18:30	Scoring by quarter: 15–15, 14–17, 20–17, 22–16
	Pts: Higgins 15; Rebs: Mirotić, Tomić 5 Asts: Pangos 5 PIR: Claver 15	Boxscore	Pts: Marinković 17; Rebs: Dubljević 6 Asts: Vives 5 PIR: Marinković 12	Arena: WiZink Center; Attendance: 11,018; Referees: Daniel Hierrezuelo, Carlos Cortés, Raúl Zamorano

== Statistics ==
Legend
GP	Games played	GS	Games started	MPG	Minutes per game
FG%	Field-goal percentage	3FG%	3-point field-goal percentage	FT%	Free-throw percentage
RPG	Rebounds per game	APG	Assists per game	SPG	Steals per game
BPG	Blocks per game	PPG	Points per game	PIR	PIR per game

=== Liga ACB ===
Player	GP	GS	MPG	2FG%	3FG%	FT%	RPG	APG	SPG	BPG	PPG	PIR
Alberto Abalde	27	8	17:57	.581	.425	.764	3.3	1.5	0.6	0.0	8.7	10.9
Quino Colom	28	5	15:31	.524	.258	.808	1.2	2.9	0.5	0.0	6.4	6.1
Aaron Doornekamp	28	17	17:30	.466	.432	.763	2.6	0.9	0.5	0.1	5.5	5.3
Bojan Dubljević	29	15	21:07	.549	.385	.816	5.9	1.7	0.5	0.2	10.2	13.8
Louis Labeyrie	28	11	20:15	.623	.331	.754	5.0	0.6	0.6	0.4	7.1	11.9
Jordan Loyd	23	13	22:40	.522	.403	.842	1.7	2.1	1.2	0.1	12.8	10.7
Vanja Marinković	22	4	12:50	.573	.363	.890	0.9	0.4	0.5	0.1	5.9	4.1
Brock Motum	18	4	12:22	.586	.407	.780	1.7	0.1	0.2	0.2	5.6	4.7
Maurice Ndour	19	10	16:46	.499	.191	.825	3.7	0.6	0.6	0.5	6.0	7.1
Tomáš Pavelka	1	0	1:12	.000	.000	.000	2.0	0.0	0.0	0.0	0.0	1.0
Fernando San Emeterio	24	12	18:40	.507	.412	.893	2.4	1.5	0.3	0.0	7.6	9.0
Joan Sastre	20	9	14:31	.500	.444	.875	0.8	1.0	0.7	0.1	4.9	4.8
Mike Tobey	23	12	17:07	.612	.381	.574	6.4	0.6	0.2	0.6	8.4	11.0
Sam Van Rossom	20	16	21:56	.523	.438	.850	1.9	4.1	0.4	0.0	8.4	8.7
Guillem Vives	20	9	18:18	.487	.375	.893	1.8	2.3	1.3	0.3	6.8	7.8

Source: ACB

=== EuroLeague ===
Player	GP	GS	MPG	2FG%	3FG%	FT%	RPG	APG	SPG	BPG	PPG	PIR
Alberto Abalde	23	4	21:42	.505	.283	.735	4.0	1.7	0.5	0.0	7.8	8.9
Quino Colom	26	8	18:28	.430	.315	.709	1.5	4.2	0.7	0.0	7.3	9.1
Aaron Doornekamp	28	13	16:11	.517	.405	.688	2.3	0.9	0.4	0.1	4.9	4.9
Bojan Dubljević	26	21	23:29	.598	.349	.828	6.5	1.7	0.6	0.2	14.2	18.0
Guillem Ferrando	1	0	4:20	.000	.000	.000	1.0	1.0	0.0	0.0	0.0	–2.0
Millán Jiménez	1	0	0:20	.000	.000	.000	0.0	0.0	0.0	0.0	0.0	0.0
Louis Labeyrie	27	16	20:15	.603	.324	.786	4.6	0.7	0.5	0.3	5.1	8.7
Jordan Loyd	18	9	21:53	.405	.429	.774	1.9	2.4	0.7	0.1	11.1	8.8
Vanja Marinković	27	11	14:53	.554	.329	.833	1.0	0.4	0.4	0.0	6.3	3.9
Brock Motum	20	3	12:56	.534	.387	.806	1.5	0.5	0.4	0.1	6.2	5.3
Maurice Ndour	26	12	15:01	.604	.400	.806	2.4	0.4	0.9	0.3	6.3	7.0
Fernando San Emeterio	24	15	17:45	.492	.468	.750	1.8	1.6	0.4	0.0	7.3	8.5
Joan Sastre	12	5	13:39	.471	.611	.700	1.3	1.1	0.8	0.3	4.7	5.6
Mike Tobey	21	2	15:15	.607	.308	.711	4.3	0.6	0.5	0.5	8.1	8.7
Sam Van Rossom	14	7	20:43	.500	.348	.938	2.1	4.6	0.5	0.0	6.9	9.0
Guillem Vives	20	14	20:25	.532	.246	.913	1.4	2.0	0.8	0.1	5.7	4.3

Source: EuroLeague

=== Copa del Rey ===
Player	GP	GS	MPG	2FG%	3FG%	FT%	RPG	APG	SPG	BPG	PPG	PIR
Alberto Abalde	2	0	23:38	.429	.250	.857	7.5	1.0	0.0	0.0	10.5	14.0
Quino Colom	2	0	17:56	.364	.429	.500	1.0	3.0	1.0	0.0	9.0	5.5
Aaron Doornekamp	2	1	21:01	.500	.667	.778	4.0	2.5	0.5	0.0	9.5	12.0
Bojan Dubljević	2	2	20:57	.444	.500	.000	6.0	0.5	0.0	0.0	10.0	9.0
Louis Labeyrie	2	0	23:53	.500	.333	.000	3.5	1.5	0.0	1.5	3.5	7.0
Vanja Marinković	1	1	7:10	1.000	.000	.000	0.0	0.0	0.0	0.0	2.0	0.0
Maurice Ndour	2	2	15:25	.500	.500	.500	1.5	0.0	1.0	0.0	5.0	4.5
Fernando San Emeterio	2	1	19:46	.667	.250	.500	1.5	2.5	1.0	0.0	4.0	7.5
Joan Sastre	2	1	16:31	.500	.167	.000	1.0	2.5	0.5	0.0	2.5	2.5
Mike Tobey	2	0	18:55	.625	.333	.500	4.5	0.0	0.5	0.0	13.5	13.5
Guillem Vives	2	2	18:17	.200	.500	1.000	0.0	1.5	0.0	0.5	6.5	0.5

Source: ACB

=== Supercopa de España ===
Player	GP	GS	MPG	2FG%	3FG%	FT%	RPG	APG	SPG	BPG	PPG	PIR
Alberto Abalde	1	1	18:30	.667	.000	.000	5.0	1.0	1.0	0.0	4.0	6.0
Aaron Doornekamp	1	0	18:28	.000	.500	.000	1.0	1.0	1.0	1.0	3.0	3.0
Bojan Dubljević	1	1	26:37	.000	.000	.000	6.0	4.0	0.0	0.0	0.0	4.0
Louis Labeyrie	1	0	10:52	.500	.333	.000	2.0	0.0	0.0	0.0	5.0	2.0
Jordan Loyd	1	0	16:12	.667	.500	.000	2.0	1.0	1.0	0.0	7.0	–1.0
Vanja Marinković	1	0	20:37	.500	.625	.000	0.0	0.0	1.0	0.0	17.0	12.0
Brock Motum	1	1	21:22	1.000	.000	1.000	2.0	0.0	0.0	0.0	10.0	9.0
Fernando San Emeterio	1	0	3:55	.000	.000	.000	0.0	0.0	0.0	0.0	0.0	–1.0
Joan Sastre	1	1	9:40	.000	.000	.000	1.0	1.0	0.0	0.0	0.0	–2.0
Mike Tobey	1	0	13:22	.750	.500	.000	3.0	0.0	0.0	0.0	9.0	10.0
Sam Van Rossom	1	1	22:15	.500	.333	.000	2.0	2.0	1.0	0.0	7.0	5.0
Guillem Vives	1	0	18:01	.000	1.000	.000	2.0	5.0	1.0	1.0	3.0	9.0

Source: ACB
