= 2020 ACB Playoffs =

Tournament details
- Country: Spain
- City: Valencia
- Venue(s): La Fonteta
- Dates: 17–30 June 2020
- Teams: 12
- Defending champions: Real Madrid

Final positions
- Champions: Kirolbet Baskonia; 4th ACB title 4th Spanish title
- Runner-up: Barça
- Semifinalists: Valencia Basket; San Pablo Burgos

Tournament statistics
- Matches played: 33

The 2020 ACB Playoffs, also known as 2020 Liga Endesa Playoffs for sponsorship reasons, was the postseason tournament of the ACB's 2019–20 season, which began on 24 September 2019. The playoffs started on 17 June 2020 and ended on 30 June 2020 with the Final. All matches were played behind closed doors.

Real Madrid was the defending champion which was eliminated in group stage by San Pablo Burgos which qualified to semifinals for its first time. Kirolbet Baskonia won their fourth ACB and Spanish title after 10 years of the last Spanish title.

All times were in Central European Summer Time (UTC+02:00).

== Format ==
Due to the COVID-19 pandemic, the top 12 teams after round 23 played in the Pavelló Municipal Font de Sant Lluís (Valencia) to win the league. The teams were divided into two groups of six, playing every team in their group once. The top two teams per group qualified for the semifinals. From semifinals onwards, the teams played a single-elimination tournament consisting of two rounds. A total of 33 matches were played within two weeks.

== Qualifying ==
Initially, eight teams would qualify for the playoffs. However, due to the COVID-19 pandemic, the playoffs were expanded to 12 teams after the early ending of the regular season.

| Pos | Team | Pld | W | L | PF | PA | PD | Qualification |
|---|---|---|---|---|---|---|---|---|
| 1 | Barça | 23 | 19 | 4 | 2041 | 1847 | +194 | Qualification to playoffs |
| 2 | Real Madrid | 23 | 18 | 5 | 1988 | 1758 | +230 | Qualification to playoffs |
| 3 | Casademont Zaragoza | 23 | 16 | 7 | 1911 | 1810 | +101 | Qualification to playoffs |
| 4 | Iberostar Tenerife | 22 | 14 | 8 | 1802 | 1736 | +66 | Qualification to playoffs |
| 5 | RETAbet Bilbao Basket | 23 | 14 | 9 | 1906 | 1908 | −2 | Qualification to playoffs |
| 6 | MoraBanc Andorra | 23 | 13 | 10 | 1865 | 1814 | +51 | Qualification to playoffs |
| 7 | Valencia Basket | 23 | 12 | 11 | 1950 | 1794 | +156 | Qualification to playoffs |
| 8 | Kirolbet Baskonia | 23 | 12 | 11 | 1926 | 1886 | +40 | Qualification to playoffs |
| 9 | Unicaja | 23 | 12 | 11 | 1823 | 1798 | +25 | Qualification to playoffs |
| 10 | San Pablo Burgos | 23 | 12 | 11 | 1840 | 1874 | −34 | Qualification to playoffs |
| 11 | Herbalife Gran Canaria | 22 | 11 | 11 | 1775 | 1787 | −12 | Qualification to playoffs |
| 12 | Club Joventut Badalona | 23 | 9 | 14 | 1936 | 2020 | −84 | Qualification to playoffs |

Source: ACB

== Venue ==
On May 27, 2020, ACB selected and announced Valencia to host the exceptional playoffs in the two last weeks of June. The matches were played in La Fonteta and the teams trained in L'Alqueria del Basket which had 9 indoor courts, 4 outdoor courts and 15,000 square metres.

| Valencia | Valencia (Spain) |
| La Fonteta | Valencia (Spain) |

== Group stage ==
The teams were divided into two groups of six, playing every team in their group once. The top two teams per group qualified for the semifinals. It started on 17 June and ended on 26 June 2020.

=== Group A ===
| Pos | Team | Pld | W | L | PF | PA | PD | Qualification |
|---|---|---|---|---|---|---|---|---|
| 1 | Barça | 5 | 4 | 1 | 432 | 400 | +32 | Qualification to the semifinals |
| 2 | Kirolbet Baskonia | 5 | 3 | 2 | 402 | 379 | +23 | Qualification to the semifinals |
| 3 | Unicaja | 5 | 3 | 2 | 418 | 395 | +23 | |
| 4 | Iberostar Tenerife | 5 | 2 | 3 | 381 | 406 | −25 | |
| 5 | Club Joventut Badalona | 5 | 2 | 3 | 423 | 429 | −6 | |
| 6 | RETAbet Bilbao Basket | 5 | 1 | 4 | 359 | 406 | −47 | |

Source: ACB

| 17 June 2020 | Barça | 96–92 | Club Joventut Badalona | Valencia |
| 15:30 | Scoring by quarter: 21–17, 23–13, 30–27, 22–35 |
| | Pts: Mirotić 16; Rebs: Claver, Tomić 6 Asts: Hanga 8 PIR: Mirotić 21 | Boxscore | Pts: Morgan 21; Rebs: Omić 8 Asts: three players 4 PIR: Omić 21 | Arena: La Fonteta; Referees: Antonio Conde, Jordi Aliaga, Sergio Manuel |

| 17 June 2020 | Iberostar Tenerife | 70–83 | Unicaja | Valencia |
| 18:30 | Scoring by quarter: 15–20, 17–23, 22–19, 16–21 |
| | Pts: Salin 15; Rebs: Díez 11; Asts: Huertas 9 PIR: Bogris, Díez 18 | Boxscore | Pts: Waczyński 17; Rebs: Gerun 5 Asts: Mekel 10; PIR: Gerun, Waczyński 16 | Arena: La Fonteta; Referees: Carlos Peruga, Fernando Calatrava, Juan de Dios Oyón |

| 17 June 2020 | RETAbet Bilbao Basket | 64–87 | Kirolbet Baskonia | Valencia |
| 21:30 | Scoring by quarter: 23–23, 14–21, 13–28, 14–15 |
| | Pts: Rousselle 12; Rebs: Balvín 10; Asts: Schreiner 6 PIR: Balvín, Martínez 12 | Boxscore | Pts: Vildoza 20; Rebs: Shengelia 9 Asts: Henry 6 PIR: Vildoza 30 | Arena: La Fonteta; Referees: Daniel Hierrezuelo, Carlos Cortés, Rafael Serrano |

| 19 June 2020 | RETAbet Bilbao Basket | 79–86(OT) | Club Joventut Badalona | Valencia |
| 15:30 | Scoring by quarter: 22–23, 23–20, 11–7, 17–23, Overtime: 6–13 |
| | Pts: Rousselle 18; Rebs: Balvín, Cruz 7 Asts: three players 4 PIR: Lammers, Rousselle 16 | Boxscore | Pts: Prepelič 21; Rebs: Omić 12; Asts: Dimitrijević 7 PIR: Prepelič 25 | Arena: La Fonteta; Referees: Miguel Ángel Pérez Pérez, Luis Miguel Castillo, José Ramón García Ortiz |

| 19 June 2020 | Unicaja | 73–84 | Barça | Valencia |
| 18:30 | Scoring by quarter: 20–14, 21–24, 15–23, 17–23 |
| | Pts: Waczyński 13; Rebs: Suárez 9 Asts: Mekel 5 PIR: Waczyński 18 | Boxscore | Pts: Mirotić 19; Rebs: Tomić 7 Asts: Heurtel 6 PIR: Tomić 25 | Arena: La Fonteta; Referees: Juan Carlos García González, Óscar Perea, Javier Torres |

| 19 June 2020 | Kirolbet Baskonia | 79–72 | Iberostar Tenerife | Valencia |
| 21:30 | Scoring by quarter: 22–15, 22–18, 21–21, 14–18 |
| | Pts: Shengelia 21; Rebs: Shengelia 6 Asts: Shengelia 7 PIR: Shengelia 34 | Boxscore | Pts: Shermadini 18; Rebs: Shermadini 11; Asts: Huertas 7 PIR: Shermadini 23 | Arena: La Fonteta; Referees: José Antonio Martín Bertrán, Antonio Conde, Arnau Padros |

| 21 June 2020 | Iberostar Tenerife | 70–78 | RETAbet Bilbao Basket | Valencia |
| 15:30 | Scoring by quarter: 15–20, 17–13, 20–28, 18–17 |
| | Pts: Zeisloft 22; Rebs: Díez 5 Asts: Huertas 5 PIR: Zeisloft 17 | Boxscore | Pts: Martínez, Rousselle 13; Rebs: Sulejmanović 10; Asts: Rousselle 5 PIR: Martínez 19 | Arena: La Fonteta; Referees: Juan Carlos García González, Jordi Aliaga, Joaquín García González |

| 21 June 2020 | Club Joventut Badalona | 89–98 | Unicaja | Valencia |
| 18:30 | Scoring by quarter: 20–13, 16–26, 20–22, 33–37 |
| | Pts: Prepelič 26; Rebs: López-Arostegui, Omić 8 Asts: four players 3 PIR: Prepelič 23 | Boxscore | Pts: Bouteille 28; Rebs: Suárez 7 Asts: Guerrero 4 PIR: Bouteille 29 | Arena: La Fonteta; Referees: Daniel Hierrezuelo, Carlos Cortés, Juan de Dios Oyón |

| 21 June 2020 | Barça | 81–75 | Kirolbet Baskonia | Valencia |
| 21:30 | Scoring by quarter: 20–11, 22–28, 13–17, 26–19 |
| | Pts: Hanga 15; Rebs: Mirotić 8 Asts: Hanga 7 PIR: Mirotić 22 | Boxscore | Pts: Shields 26; Rebs: Eric 8 Asts: Granger, Henry 4 PIR: Shields 22 | Arena: La Fonteta; Referees: Carlos Peruga, Emilio Pérez Pizarro, Sergio Manuel |

| 23 June 2020 | Kirolbet Baskonia | 87–86(OT) | Unicaja | Valencia |
| 15:30 | Scoring by quarter: 19–19, 25–14, 10–23, 22–20, Overtime: 11–10 |
| | Pts: Henry 14; Rebs: Polonara, Vildoza 7 Asts: Shengelia 7 PIR: Henry 21 | Boxscore | Pts: Díaz, Mekel 17; Rebs: Thompson 9 Asts: Adams 3 PIR: Bouteille, Thompson 18 | Arena: La Fonteta; Referees: Carlos Peruga, Antonio Conde, Carlos Cortés |

| 23 June 2020 | RETAbet Bilbao Basket | 73–85 | Barça | Valencia |
| 18:30 | Scoring by quarter: 16–19, 17–15, 23–27, 17–24 |
| | Pts: Rousselle, Sulejmanović 11; Rebs: Cruz 9 Asts: Serron 6 PIR: Rodríguez 14 | Boxscore | Pts: Oriola 23; Rebs: Oriola 9 Asts: Hanga 12; PIR: Oriola 29 | Arena: La Fonteta; Referees: Fernando Calatrava, Luis Miguel Castillo, José Ramón García Ortiz |

| 23 June 2020 | Iberostar Tenerife | 82–80 | Club Joventut Badalona | Valencia |
| 21:30 | Scoring by quarter: 18–12, 11–23, 26–15, 27–30 |
| | Pts: Lundberg 20; Rebs: Bogris 9 Asts: López 8 PIR: Lundberg 22 | Boxscore | Pts: Prepelič 18; Rebs: Omić 9 Asts: Prepelič 5 PIR: Morgan 16 | Arena: La Fonteta; Referees: Emilio Pérez Pizarro, Rafael Serrano, Joaquín García González |

| 25 June 2020 | Club Joventut Badalona | 76–74 | Kirolbet Baskonia | Valencia |
| 15:30 | Scoring by quarter: 16–13, 23–17, 15–21, 22–23 |
| | Pts: Kanter 18; Rebs: Kanter 7 Asts: Ventura 3 PIR: Kanter 20 | Boxscore | Pts: Polonara 18; Rebs: Polonara 7 Asts: three players 3 PIR: Polonara 21 | Arena: La Fonteta; Referees: Miguel Ángel Pérez Pérez, Juan de Dios Oyón, José Ramón García Ortiz |

| 25 June 2020 | Unicaja | 78–65 | RETAbet Bilbao Basket | Valencia |
| 18:30 | Scoring by quarter: 20–13, 22–26, 19–9, 17–17 |
| | Pts: Adams 19; Rebs: three players 6 Asts: Díaz 8 PIR: Adams 17 | Boxscore | Pts: Rousselle 14; Rebs: Balvín 11; Asts: Rousselle 7 PIR: Balvín 26 | Arena: La Fonteta; Referees: José Antonio Martín Bertrán, Rafael Serrano, Arnau Padros |

| 25 June 2020 | Barça | 86–87 | Iberostar Tenerife | Valencia |
| 21:30 | Scoring by quarter: 17–25, 20–22, 24–14, 25–26 |
| | Pts: Davies 20; Rebs: Davies 11; Asts: Heurtel, Ribas 4 PIR: Davies 24 | Boxscore | Pts: Konaté 18; Rebs: Guerra 6 Asts: Lundberg 6 PIR: Konaté 27 | Arena: La Fonteta; Referees: Emilio Pérez Pizarro, Luis Miguel Castillo, Javier Torres |

=== Group B ===
| Pos | Team | Pld | W | L | PF | PA | PD | Qualification |
|---|---|---|---|---|---|---|---|---|
| 1 | Valencia Basket (H) | 5 | 4 | 1 | 460 | 411 | +49 | Qualification to the semifinals |
| 2 | San Pablo Burgos | 5 | 3 | 2 | 444 | 440 | +4 | Qualification to the semifinals |
| 3 | Real Madrid | 5 | 3 | 2 | 441 | 429 | +12 | |
| 4 | Herbalife Gran Canaria | 5 | 2 | 3 | 425 | 448 | −23 | |
| 5 | MoraBanc Andorra | 5 | 2 | 3 | 452 | 450 | +2 | |
| 6 | Casademont Zaragoza | 5 | 1 | 4 | 423 | 467 | −44 | |

Source: ACB
(H) Hosts

| 18 June 2020 | MoraBanc Andorra | 74–90 | Valencia Basket | Valencia |
| 15:30 | Scoring by quarter: 14–22, 27–28, 19–17, 14–23 |
| | Pts: Jelínek 11; Rebs: Todorović 7 Asts: Hannah 6 PIR: Senglin 12 | Boxscore | Pts: Abalde 17; Rebs: Tobey 13; Asts: Van Rossom 7 PIR: Tobey 27 | Arena: La Fonteta; Referees: Miguel Ángel Pérez Pérez, Luis Miguel Castillo, Javier Torres |

| 18 June 2020 | Real Madrid | 91–73 | Herbalife Gran Canaria | Valencia |
| 18:30 | Scoring by quarter: 37–16, 21–32, 11–14, 22–11 |
| | Pts: Carroll, Llull 19; Rebs: Thompkins 8 Asts: Deck 4 PIR: Llull 20 | Boxscore | Pts: Costello 26; Rebs: Costello 8 Asts: Cook 4 PIR: Costello 28 | Arena: La Fonteta; Referees: José Antonio Martín Bertrán, Juan Carlos García González, Joaquín García González |

| 18 June 2020 | Casademont Zaragoza | 86–92 | San Pablo Burgos | Valencia |
| 21:30 | Scoring by quarter: 21–26, 18–21, 24–22, 23–23 |
| | Pts: Benzing, Ennis 15; Rebs: Brussino 8 Asts: Alocén 7 PIR: Brussino 22 | Boxscore | Pts: McFadden 14; Rebs: Aguilar, Rivero 5 Asts: Bassas 7 PIR: Bassas 17 | Arena: La Fonteta; Referees: Emilio Pérez Pizarro, Óscar Perea, Arnau Padros |

| 20 June 2020 | San Pablo Burgos | 87–83 | Real Madrid | Valencia |
| 15:30 | Scoring by quarter: 22–23, 22–18, 24–21, 19–21 |
| | Pts: McFadden 18; Rebs: Aguilar 11; Asts: three players 3 PIR: McFadden 19 | Boxscore | Pts: Campazzo, Llull 13; Rebs: Tavares 10; Asts: three players 3 PIR: Tavares 28 | Arena: La Fonteta; Referees: Fernando Calatrava, Carlos Cortés, Rafael Serrano |

| 20 June 2020 | MoraBanc Andorra | 88–104 | Herbalife Gran Canaria | Valencia |
| 18:30 | Scoring by quarter: 14–25, 23–27, 27–23, 24–29 |
| | Pts: Hannah 14; Rebs: three players 4 Asts: four players 3 PIR: Senglin 15 | Boxscore | Pts: Cook 21; Rebs: Costello, Rabaseda 5 Asts: Cook 10; PIR: Cook 30 | Arena: La Fonteta; Referees: Carlos Peruga, Óscar Perea, Sergio Manuel |

| 20 June 2020 | Valencia Basket | 89–71 | Casademont Zaragoza | Valencia |
| 21:30 | Scoring by quarter: 15–20, 20–25, 24–10, 30–16 |
| | Pts: Tobey 17; Rebs: Tobey 11; Asts: Van Rossom 5 PIR: Tobey 24 | Boxscore | Pts: three players 14; Rebs: Radović 4 Asts: three players 4 PIR: Alocén, Ennis 17 | Arena: La Fonteta; Referees: Daniel Hierrezuelo, Jordi Aliaga, Juan de Dios Oyón |

| 22 June 2020 | Herbalife Gran Canaria | 91–87(OT) | San Pablo Burgos | Valencia |
| 15:30 | Scoring by quarter: 21–24, 19–10, 20–22, 18–22, Overtime: 13–9 |
| | Pts: Bourousis 25; Rebs: Costello 9 Asts: Cook 6 PIR: Bourousis 32 | Boxscore | Pts: Benite 26; Rebs: three players 9 Asts: Bassas 4 PIR: Benite 26 | Arena: La Fonteta; Referees: Daniel Hierrezuelo, Óscar Perea, Javier Torres |

| 22 June 2020 | Real Madrid | 95–90 | Valencia Basket | Valencia |
| 18:30 | Scoring by quarter: 31–21, 25–31, 18–19, 21–19 |
| | Pts: Campazzo 29; Rebs: Tavares 9 Asts: Campazzo 11; PIR: Campazzo 42 | Boxscore | Pts: Abalde 17; Rebs: Loyd, Tobey 6 Asts: Colom 4 PIR: Abalde 21 | Arena: La Fonteta; Referees: Emilio Pérez Pizarro, Fernando Calatrava, Arnau Padros |

| 22 June 2020 | Casademont Zaragoza | 93–113 | MoraBanc Andorra | Valencia |
| 21:30 | Scoring by quarter: 28–24, 17–26, 19–25, 29–38 |
| | Pts: Benzing, Brussino 19; Rebs: Hlinason, Radović 5 Asts: Alocén, Radović 5 PIR: Brussino 21 | Boxscore | Pts: Todorović 26; Rebs: Olumuyiwa 7 Asts: Hannah, Walker 5 PIR: Todorović 29 | Arena: La Fonteta; Referees: Antonio Conde, Rafael Serrano, José Ramón García Ortiz |

| 24 June 2020 | Casademont Zaragoza | 85–76 | Herbalife Gran Canaria | Valencia |
| 15:30 | Scoring by quarter: 19–26, 26–23, 26–17, 14–10 |
| | Pts: Brussino 20; Rebs: Brussino 9 Asts: Brussino 4 PIR: Brussino 34 | Boxscore | Pts: Okoye 17; Rebs: Costello 13; Asts: Cook 7 PIR: Costello 23 | Arena: La Fonteta; Referees: Miguel Ángel Pérez Pérez, Juan de Dios Oyón, Arnau Padros |

| 24 June 2020 | MoraBanc Andorra | 91–75 | Real Madrid | Valencia |
| 18:30 | Scoring by quarter: 19–12, 23–18, 29–28, 20–17 |
| | Pts: Hannah 23; Rebs: Pérez 7 Asts: Massenat 5 PIR: Hannah 20 | Boxscore | Pts: Campazzo 18; Rebs: Tavares, Thompkins 7 Asts: Campazzo 6 PIR: Campazzo 26 | Arena: La Fonteta; Referees: Daniel Hierrezuelo, Sergio Manuel, Javier Torres |

| 24 June 2020 | Valencia Basket | 94–90 | San Pablo Burgos | Valencia |
| 21:30 | Scoring by quarter: 20–27, 19–24, 19–16, 36–23 |
| | Pts: Tobey 21; Rebs: Tobey 13; Asts: Van Rossom 7 PIR: Tobey 28 | Boxscore | Pts: Fitipaldo 17; Rebs: Lima 7 Asts: Bassas 9 PIR: Fitipaldo 17 | Arena: La Fonteta; Referees: José Antonio Martín Bertrán, Juan Carlos García González, Jordi Aliaga |

| 26 June 2020 | San Pablo Burgos | 88–86 | MoraBanc Andorra | Valencia |
| 15:30 | Scoring by quarter: 17–22, 23–31, 22–19, 26–14 |
| | Pts: Benite 23; Rebs: Lima 8 Asts: Bassas 5 PIR: Apić 23 | Boxscore | Pts: Jelínek 19; Rebs: Sy 7 Asts: Massenat 8 PIR: Jelínek, Massenat 14 | Arena: La Fonteta; Referees: Juan Carlos García González, Carlos Cortés, Fernando Calatrava |

| 26 June 2020 | Herbalife Gran Canaria | 81–97 | Valencia Basket | Valencia |
| 18:30 | Scoring by quarter: 23–29, 21–22, 12–26, 25–20 |
| | Pts: Harper 15; Rebs: Shurna 6 Asts: Cook 8 PIR: Cook, Paulí 19 | Boxscore | Pts: Loyd 26; Rebs: Tobey 11; Asts: Colom, Loyd 3 PIR: Loyd 29 | Arena: La Fonteta; Referees: Daniel Hierrezuelo, Antonio Conde, Sergio Manuel |

| 26 June 2020 | Real Madrid | 97–88 | Casademont Zaragoza | Valencia |
| 21:30 | Scoring by quarter: 22–17, 26–19, 29–25, 20–27 |
| | Pts: Tavares 22; Rebs: Tavares 14; Asts: Campazzo 6 PIR: Tavares 43 | Boxscore | Pts: Ennis 13; Rebs: Barreiro 5 Asts: Alocén 6 PIR: Alocén 23 | Arena: La Fonteta; Referees: Carlos Peruga, Óscar Perea, Joaquín García González |

== Final Four ==
The Final Four was a single-elimination tournament consisting of two rounds. It was played on 28–30 June 2020.

=== Bracket ===
Semifinals
Barça | 98
San Pablo Burgos | 84
Valencia Basket | 73
Kirolbet Baskonia | 75

Final
Barça | 67
Kirolbet Baskonia | 69

=== Semifinals ===
| 28 June 2020 | Barça | 98–84 | San Pablo Burgos | Valencia |
| 17:00 | Scoring by quarter: 23–17, 20–24, 29–17, 26–26 |
| | Pts: Mirotić 18; Rebs: Oriola 6 Asts: Heurtel 11; PIR: Heurtel 20 | Boxscore | Pts: Benite 16; Rebs: Aguilar 7 Asts: Bassas 4 PIR: Apić, Fitipaldo 13 | Arena: La Fonteta; Referees: Daniel Hierrezuelo, Carlos Cortés, Jordi Aliaga |

| 28 June 2020 | Valencia Basket | 73–75 | Kirolbet Baskonia | Valencia |
| 20:00 | Scoring by quarter: 17–12, 25–21, 13–23, 18–19 |
| | Pts: Van Rossom 14; Rebs: Tobey 9 Asts: three players 3 PIR: Tobey, Van Rossom 13 | Boxscore | Pts: Dragić 21; Rebs: Polonara, Shields 5 Asts: Henry, Vildoza 4 PIR: Dragić 25 | Arena: La Fonteta; Referees: Juan Carlos García González, Carlos Peruga, Fernando Calatrava |

=== Final ===
| 30 June 2020 | Barça | 67–69 | Kirolbet Baskonia | Valencia |
| 20:00 | Scoring by quarter: 16–17, 23–16, 12–18, 16–18 |
| | Pts: Heurtel 21; Rebs: Davies 8 Asts: Heurtel 5 PIR: Heurtel 25 | Boxscore | Pts: Vildoza 17; Rebs: Diop 7 Asts: Henry 3 PIR: Vildoza 20 | Arena: La Fonteta; Referees: Carlos Peruga, Daniel Hierrezuelo, Antonio Conde |
