= 2020 Copa del Rey de Baloncesto =

Spanish basketball competition

2020 Copa del Rey
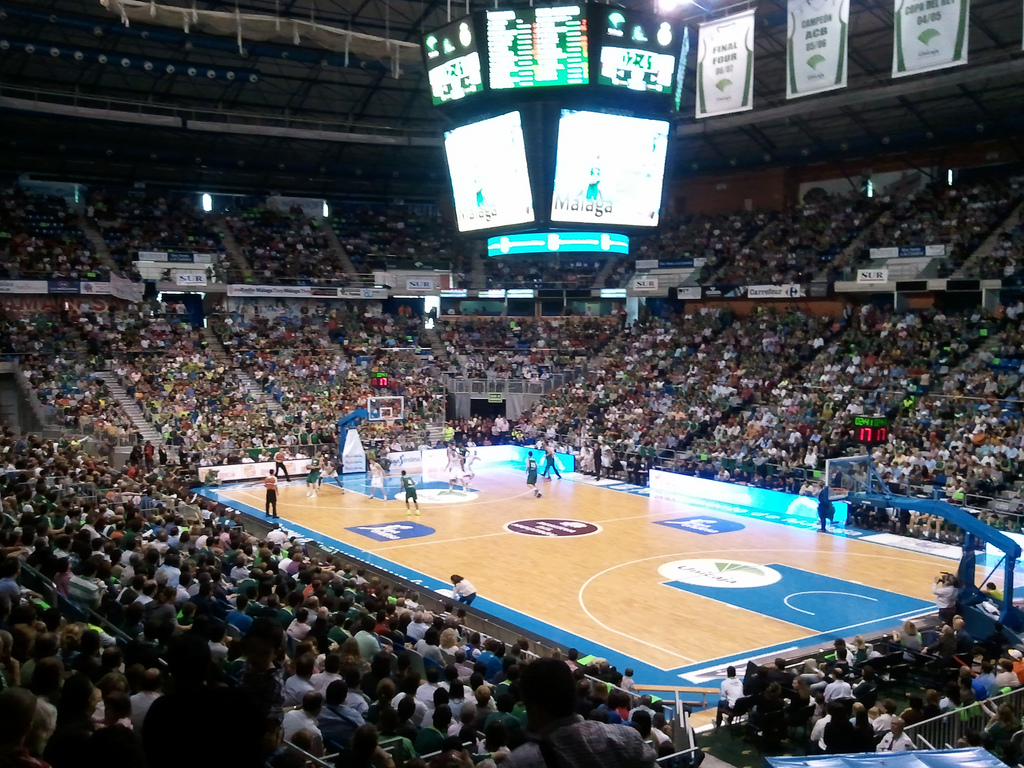
- The Martín Carpena will host the Copa del Rey

Tournament details
- Country: Spain
- City: Málaga
- Venue: Martín Carpena
- Dates: 13–16 February 2020
- Teams: 8
- Defending champions: Barça

Final positions
- Champions: Real Madrid (28th title)
- Runners-up: Unicaja
- Semifinalists: Valencia Basket; MoraBanc Andorra

Tournament statistics
- Matches played: 7

Awards
- MVP: (Argentina) Facundo Campazzo
- All statistics correct as of 16 February 2020.

The 2020 Copa del Rey de Baloncesto was the 84th edition of the Spanish King's Basketball Cup. It was managed by the ACB and was held in Málaga, in the Martín Carpena in February 2020.

All times are in Central European Time (UTC+01:00).

== Qualified teams ==
The top seven ranking teams after the first half of the 2019–20 ACB regular season and Unicaja, as host team, qualified for the cup.

Pos	Team	Pld	W	L	PF	PA	PD	Seeding
1	Real Madrid	17	14	3	1454	1275	+179	Qualified as seeded teams
2	Barça	17	13	4	1542	1409	+133	Qualified as seeded teams
3	Casademont Zaragoza	17	12	5	1423	1342	+81	Qualified as seeded teams
4	Iberostar Tenerife	17	11	6	1388	1279	+109	Qualified as seeded teams
5	RETAbet Bilbao Basket	17	10	7	1407	1413	−6	Qualified as unseeded teams
6	Valencia Basket	17	9	8	1458	1339	+119	Qualified as unseeded teams
7	MoraBanc Andorra	17	9	8	1391	1372	+19	Qualified as unseeded teams
9	Unicaja (H)	17	9	8	1305	1310	−5	Qualified as unseeded teams

Source: ACB
(H) Qualified as host

== Draw ==
The 2020 Copa del Rey de Baloncesto was drawn on 13 January 2020. The seeded teams were paired in the quarterfinals with the non-seeded teams. There were not any restrictions for the draw of the semifinals. As in recent seasons, the first qualified team plays its quarterfinal game on Thursday.

== Bracket ==
Quarterfinals
13 February
Barça	78
Valencia Basket	82
13 February
Real Madrid	93
RETAbet Bilbao Basket	83
14 February
Iberostar Tenerife	85
MoraBanc Andorra	87
14 February
Unicaja	90
Casademont Zaragoza	86

Semifinals
15 February
Valencia Basket	68
Real Madrid	91
15 February
MoraBanc Andorra	59
Unicaja	92

Final
16 February
Real Madrid	95
Unicaja	68

== Quarterfinals ==
=== Barça vs. Valencia Basket ===
13 February 2020	Barça	78–82	Valencia Basket	Málaga
19:00 CET (UTC+1)	Scoring by quarter: 18–19, 20–22, 14–23, 26–18
	Pts: Mirotić 25; Rebs: Mirotić 8 Asts: Delaney 8 PIR: Mirotić 24	Boxscore	Pts: Tobey 16; Rebs: Abalde 9 Asts: San Emeterio, Doornekamp 4 PIR: Tobey 22	Arena: Martín Carpena Arena; Attendance: 9.857; Referees: Emilio Pérez Pizarro, Carlos Cortés Rey, Luis Miguel Castillo

=== Real Madrid vs. RETAbet Bilbao Basket ===
13 February 2020	Real Madrid	93–83	RETAbet Bilbao Basket	Málaga
21:30 CET (UTC+1)	Scoring by quarter: 23–21, 27–26, 23–16, 20–20
	Pts: Llull 19; Rebs: Tavares 14; Asts: Campazzo 9 PIR: Tavares 26	Boxscore	Pts: Rousselle 16; Rebs: Balvín 12; Asts: Rousselle 5 PIR: Balvín 19	Arena: Martín Carpena Arena; Attendance: 10.070; Referees: Carlos Peruga, Fernando Calatrava Cuevas, Juan de Dios Oyón Cauqui

=== Iberostar Tenerife vs. MoraBanc Andorra ===
14 February 2020	Iberostar Tenerife	85–87	MoraBanc Andorra	Málaga
19:00 CET (UTC+1)	Scoring by quarter: 27–28, 17–21, 18–21, 23–17
	Pts: Huertas 20; Rebs: Salin, White 5 Asts: Huertas 12; PIR: Huertas 28	Boxscore	Pts: 20 Todorović; Rebs: 6 Pérez, Diagne; Asts: 6 Massenat, Hannah; PIR: 20 Todorović	Arena: Martín Carpena; Attendance: 8,736; Referees: Daniel Hierrezuelo, Antonio Conde, Martín Caballero

=== Unicaja vs. Casademont Zaragoza ===
14 February 2020	Unicaja	90–86	Casademont Zaragoza	Málaga
21:30 CET (UTC+1)	Scoring by quarter: 18–23, 23–25, 28–15, 21–23
	Pts: A. Díaz 15; Rebs: Guerrero 9 Asts: J. Fernández 7 PIR: A. Díaz 18	Boxscore	Pts: 29 Seeley; Rebs: 10 Brussino; Asts: 7 San Miguel; PIR: 26 Seeley	Arena: Martín Carpena; Attendance: 10.346; Referees: José Antonio Martín Bertrán, Óscar Pérez, Rafael Serrano

== Semifinals ==
=== Valencia Basket vs. Real Madrid ===
15 February 2020	Valencia Basket	68–91	Real Madrid	Málaga
18:30 CET (UTC+1)	Scoring by quarter: 11–18, 9–16, 24–33, 24–24
	Pts: Abalde 12; Rebs: Abalde, Dubljević 6 Asts: Colom, Sastre 5 PIR: Abalde 17	Boxscore	Pts: Randolph 16; Rebs: Tavares 10; Asts: Campazzo 7 PIR: Campazzo 31	Arena: Martín Carpena; Attendance: 10.437; Referees: Dani Hierrezuelo, Carlos Peruga, Juan de Dios Oyón

=== MoraBanc Andorra vs. Unicaja ===
15 February 2020	MoraBanc Andorra	59–92	Unicaja	Málaga
21:30 CET (UTC+1)	Scoring by quarter: 16–25, 14–23, 19–20, 10–24
	Pts: Hannah 16; Rebs: Llovet 6 Asts: Massenat 4 PIR: Massenat 14	Boxscore	Pts: 19 Fernández; Rebs: 8 Guerrero; Asts: 4 Fernández, Adams, Suárez; PIR: 22 Fernández	Arena: Martín Carpena; Attendance: 10.781; Referees: José Antonio Martín Bertrán, Antonio Conde, Carlos Cortés

== Final ==
16 February 2020	Real Madrid	95–68	Unicaja	Málaga
18:30 CET (UTC+1)	Scoring by quarter: 26–13, 17–15, 25–14, 27–26
	Pts: Carroll 20; Rebs: Reyes 5 Asts: Campazzo 13; PIR: Campazzo 29	Boxscore	Pts: 22 Brizuela; Rebs: 6 Suárez; Asts: 3 Brizuela, Adams; PIR: 19 Brizuela	Arena: Martín Carpena; Attendance: 10,874; Referees: José Antonio Martín Bertrán, Carlos Peruga, Fernando Calatrava

2020 Copa del Rey winners
Real Madrid
28th title
