= 2019–20 ACB season =

Liga Endesa^{1}
- Season: 2019–20
- Games played: 238
- Teams: 18

Regular season
- Season MVP: (Spain) Nikola Mirotić
- Relegated: None (Note: Relegations to LEB Oro were revoked due to the COVID-19 pandemic.)

Finals
- Champions: Kirolbet Baskonia; 4th ACB title 4th Spanish title
- Runners-up: Barça
- Semi-finalists: Valencia Basket; San Pablo Burgos
- Finals MVP: (Argentina) Luca Vildoza

Statistical leaders
Points	(Slovenia) Klemen Prepelič	21.7
Rebounds	(Slovenia) Alen Omić	8.0
Assists	(Brazil) Marcelinho Huertas	8.0

Records
- Biggest home win: Gran Canaria 92–54 Bilbao (26 January 2020)
- Biggest away win: Burgos 62–93 Valencia (26 October 2019)
- Highest scoring: Joventut 104–106 Manresa (14 December 2019); Zaragoza 99–111 Tenerife (11 January 2020)
- Winning streak: 8 games Real Madrid
- Losing streak: 10 games Montakit Fuenlabrada
- Highest attendance: 13,165; Estudiantes 72–87 Real Madrid (12 January 2020)
- Lowest attendance: 3,194; Andorra 93–69 Obradoiro (19 January 2020)
- Attendance: 1,369,822 (6,682 per match)
- ^{1} Sponsored league name, referring to Endesa.

The 2019–20 ACB season, also known as Liga Endesa for sponsorship reasons, was the 37th season of the top Spanish professional basketball league, since its establishment in 1983. It started on 24 September 2019 with the first round of the regular season and ended on 30 June 2020 in an exceptional end-of-season tournament in Valencia due to the COVID-19 pandemic.

Real Madrid was the defending champion which was eliminated by San Pablo Burgos which qualified to semifinals for its first time. Kirolbet Baskonia won their fourth ACB and Spanish title after 10 years of the last Spanish title.

== Teams ==
=== Promotion and relegation (pre-season) ===
A total of 18 teams contested the league, including 16 sides from the 2018–19 season and two promoted from the 2018–19 LEB Oro. This include the top team from the LEB Oro, and the winners of the LEB Oro Final Four.

Teams promoted from LEB Oro

- Coosur Real Betis
- RETAbet Bilbao Basket

=== Venues and locations ===
Location of teams in 2019–20 ACB
Location of teams from the Canary Islands in 2019–20 ACB

Team	Home city	Arena	Capacity
Barça	Barcelona	Palau Blaugrana	7,585
Baxi Manresa	Manresa	Nou Congost	5,000
Casademont Zaragoza	Zaragoza	Pabellón Príncipe Felipe	10,744
Club Joventut Badalona	Badalona	Palau Municipal d'Esports	12,760
Coosur Real Betis	Seville	San Pablo	7,242
Herbalife Gran Canaria	Las Palmas	Gran Canaria Arena	9,870
Iberostar Tenerife	San Cristóbal de La Laguna	Santiago Martín	5,000
Kirolbet Baskonia	Vitoria-Gasteiz	Fernando Buesa Arena	15,504
Monbus Obradoiro	Santiago de Compostela	Multiusos Fontes do Sar	6,000
Montakit Fuenlabrada	Fuenlabrada	Fernando Martín	5,700
MoraBanc Andorra	Andorra la Vella	M.I. Govern Andorra	5,005
Movistar Estudiantes	Madrid	WiZink Center	13,109
Real Madrid	Madrid	WiZink Center	13,109
RETAbet Bilbao Basket	Bilbao	Bilbao Arena	10,014
San Pablo Burgos	Burgos	Coliseum Burgos	9,000
UCAM Murcia	Murcia	Palacio de Deportes	7,454
Unicaja	Málaga	Martín Carpena	10,642
Valencia Basket	Valencia	Fuente de San Luis	8,500

=== Personnel and sponsorship ===
Team	Head coach	Captain	Kit manufacturer	Shirt sponsor
Barça	(Serbia) Svetislav Pešić	(Croatia) Ante Tomić	Nike	Assistència Sanitària
Baxi Manresa	(Spain) Pedro Martínez	(Spain) Pere Tomàs	Pentex	Baxi
Casademont Zaragoza	(Spain) Porfirio Fisac	(Spain) Carlos Alocén	Mercury	Casademont
Club Joventut Badalona	(Spain) Carles Duran	(Spain) Albert Ventura	Spalding	Fundación Probitas
Coosur Real Betis	(Spain) Curro Segura	(Spain) Pablo Almazán	Kappa	Coosur
Herbalife Gran Canaria	(Greece) Fotios Katsikaris	(Spain) Oriol Paulí	Spalding	Herbalife
Iberostar Tenerife	(Spain) Txus Vidorreta	(Brazil) Marcelo Huertas	Austral	Iberostar
Kirolbet Baskonia	(Montenegro) Duško Ivanović	(Georgia (country)) Tornike Shengelia	Kelme	Kirolbet
Monbus Obradoiro	(Spain) Moncho Fernández	(Spain) Pepe Pozas	Geff	Estrella Galicia 0,0
Montakit Fuenlabrada	(Spain) Paco García	(Democratic Republic of the Congo) Christian Eyenga	Pentex	Montakit
MoraBanc Andorra	(Spain) Ibon Navarro	(Andorra) Guillem Colom	Spalding	MoraBanc, Andorra
Movistar Estudiantes	(Spain) Javier Zamora	(Spain) Édgar Vicedo	Wibo	Movistar
Real Madrid	(Spain) Pablo Laso	(Spain) Felipe Reyes	Adidas	Palladium Hotel Group
RETAbet Bilbao Basket	(Spain) Álex Mumbrú	(Spain) Rafa Martínez	Hummel	RETAbet
San Pablo Burgos	(Spain) Joan Peñarroya	(Spain) Javi Vega	Hummel	Inmobiliaria San Pablo, Burgos
UCAM Murcia	(Spain) Sito Alonso	(Dominican Republic) Sadiel Rojas	Nike	UCAM, Costa Cálida
Unicaja	(Spain) Luis Casimiro	(Spain) Carlos Suárez	Joma	Unicaja, Málaga
Valencia Basket	(Spain) Jaume Ponsarnau	(Montenegro) Bojan Dubljević	Luanvi	Cultura del Esfuerzo (Note: Cultura del Esfuerzo (transl. "Culture of Effort") is the motto of the club.)

=== Managerial changes ===
Team	Outgoing manager	Manner of departure	Date of vacancy	Position in table	Replaced with	Date of appointment
Movistar Estudiantes	(Spain) Josep Maria Berrocal	Sacked	4 June 2019	Pre-season	(Serbia) Aleksandar Džikić	3 July 2019
San Pablo Burgos	(Spain) Diego Epifanio	End of contract	20 June 2019	Pre-season	(Spain) Joan Peñarroya	22 June 2019
Baxi Manresa	(Spain) Joan Peñarroya	Resigned	21 June 2019	Pre-season	(Spain) Pedro Martínez	24 June 2019
Herbalife Gran Canaria	(Spain) Pedro Martínez	Resigned	22 June 2019	Pre-season	(Greece) Fotios Katsikaris	26 June 2019
Kirolbet Baskonia	(Croatia) Velimir Perasović	Sacked	20 December 2019	6th (7–6)	(Montenegro) Duško Ivanović	24 December 2019
Movistar Estudiantes	(Serbia) Aleksandar Džikić	Sacked	21 January 2020	18th (4–14)	(Spain) Javier Zamora	21 January 2020
Montakit Fuenlabrada	(Spain) Jota Cuspinera	Sacked	27 January 2020	18th (4–15)	(Spain) Paco García	28 January 2020

== Season summary ==
On March 10, 2020, the Ministry of Health of Spain decreed that all games would be played behind closed doors due to the COVID-19 pandemic. On March 11, 2020, ACB postponed all the games of the Rounds 24 and 25, as well as those postponed games that were planned in this period. On March 16, 2020, the ACB clubs agreed unanimously on the temporary suspension of the league until April 24. On April 2, 2020, ACB suspended indefinitely the league and started to work on future scenarios to restart the league. On April 20, 2020, the ACB clubs agreed unanimously to finish prematurely the regular season due to force majeure and to continue the league with a 12-team format with two groups and a Final Four to decide the winner, with all games played in a single stage. Relegations to LEB Oro were revoked. On May 27, 2020, ACB selected and announced Valencia to host the exceptional playoffs in the two last weeks of June. The matches were played in La Fonteta and the teams trained in L'Alqueria del Basket which had 9 indoor courts, 4 outdoor courts and 15,000 square metres.

== Regular season ==
=== League table ===
Pos	Team	Pld	W	L	PF	PA	PD	Qualification
1	Barça	23	19	4	2041	1847	+194	Qualification to playoffs
2	Real Madrid	23	18	5	1988	1758	+230	Qualification to playoffs
3	Casademont Zaragoza	23	16	7	1911	1810	+101	Qualification to playoffs
4	Iberostar Tenerife	22	14	8	1802	1736	+66	Qualification to playoffs
5	RETAbet Bilbao Basket	23	14	9	1906	1908	−2	Qualification to playoffs
6	MoraBanc Andorra	23	13	10	1865	1814	+51	Qualification to playoffs
7	Valencia Basket	23	12	11	1950	1794	+156	Qualification to playoffs
8	Kirolbet Baskonia	23	12	11	1926	1886	+40	Qualification to playoffs
9	Unicaja	23	12	11	1823	1798	+25	Qualification to playoffs
10	San Pablo Burgos	23	12	11	1840	1874	−34	Qualification to playoffs
11	Herbalife Gran Canaria	22	11	11	1775	1787	−12	Qualification to playoffs
12	Club Joventut Badalona	23	9	14	1936	2020	−84	Qualification to playoffs
13	Baxi Manresa	23	9	14	1843	1937	−94	
14	Monbus Obradoiro	23	9	14	1832	1972	−140	
15	Coosur Real Betis	23	8	15	1787	1890	−103	
16	UCAM Murcia	22	7	15	1769	1845	−76	
17	Montakit Fuenlabrada	22	5	17	1727	1885	−158	
18	Movistar Estudiantes	23	5	18	1703	1863	−160	

Source: ACB

=== Positions by round ===
The table lists the positions of teams after completion of each round. In order to preserve chronological evolvements, any postponed matches are not included in the round at which they were originally scheduled, but added to the full round they were played immediately afterwards.

Team ╲ Round	1	2	3	4	5	6	7	8	9	10	11	12	13	14	15	16	17	18	19	20	21	22	23
Barça	8	5	6	5	4	3	3	3	2	2	2	2	2	2	2	2	2	2	2	1	1	1	1
Real Madrid	3	1	1	1	1	1	1	1	1	1	1	1	1	1	1	1	1	1	1	2	2	2	2
Casademont Zaragoza	9	2	4	3	2	2	2	2	3	3	3	3	3	3	3	3	3	3	3	3	3	3	3
Iberostar Tenerife	15	10	12	8	5	8	4	4	4	4	8	7	4	4	4	4	4	4	4	4	4	4	4
RETAbet Bilbao Basket	4	4	5	4	7	4	6	7	7	10	11	12	12	9	8	7	5	5	6	6	5	5	5
MoraBanc Andorra	17	11	8	12	8	10	12	9	5	8	6	4	7	10	7	5	7	7	5	5	6	7	6
Valencia Basket	2	6	3	6	10	6	8	13	10	12	9	8	5	6	5	8	6	6	7	8	7	6	7
Kirolbet Baskonia	1	7	9	13	9	7	9	5	11	7	10	9	6	7	11	12	10	10	10	11	10	8	8
Unicaja	12	15	14	9	6	9	5	6	12	9	12	11	11	11	9	6	9	8	8	7	8	9	9
San Pablo Burgos	6	3	2	2	3	5	7	12	6	5	4	6	9	5	6	9	8	9	9	9	9	10	10
Herbalife Gran Canaria	11	14	11	7	11	13	14	11	9	11	7	10	10	12	10	11	11	12	11	10	11	11	11
Club Joventut Badalona	16	17	18	18	17	14	10	8	8	6	5	5	8	8	12	10	12	11	12	12	12	12	12
Baxi Manresa	7	8	10	14	15	18	16	17	17	17	17	17	15	14	14	13	13	13	13	14	14	13	13
Monbus Obradoiro	10	18	17	17	18	17	18	18	16	15	15	13	13	13	13	14	14	14	14	13	13	14	14
Coosur Real Betis	14	9	16	15	16	15	15	16	18	18	16	16	17	18	18	16	15	16	16	16	16	16	15
UCAM Murcia	5	12	7	10	12	11	11	10	13	13	13	14	14	15	15	15	16	15	15	15	15	15	16
Montakit Fuenlabrada	13	16	13	16	14	16	17	15	14	14	14	15	16	17	16	17	17	17	18	18	17	17	17
Movistar Estudiantes	18	13	15	11	13	12	13	14	15	16	18	18	18	16	17	18	18	18	17	17	18	18	18

Leader and qualification to playoffs
Qualification to playoffs
Relegation to LEB Oro

Source: ACB

=== Results ===
Home \ Away	BAR	BAX	ZGZ	JOV	BET	HGC	IBT	KBA	MOB	MKF	MBA	MOV	RMB	RBB	BUR	UCM	UNI	VBC
Barça	—	86–74			77–59	89–75	103–71	95–87		87–74		94–72	83–63	92–94			95–105	97–94
Baxi Manresa	75–84	—	85–67		74–84	74–75	61–81		79–85		79–72		75–80	101–97		93–92	79–69	79–76
Casademont Zaragoza	89–83	86–79	—	90–92		81–62	99–111	101–80	96–64	75–65		97–87	84–67	84–61		80–70		
Club Joventut Badalona	80–95	104–106	72–93	—			77–73		101–77	79–81		78–76	69–88	97–86	74–82	104–93	82–97	
Coosur Real Betis	95–100	88–89	69–71	95–88	—	82–81					86–81	88–66	64–84	81–79	79–66		66–88	
Herbalife Gran Canaria	65–81		73–79	68–79		—		72–89	102–100	102–78	80–67			92–54	92–89	85–79		87–77
Iberostar Tenerife	83–87			96–90	94–89	100–79	—	78–79	90–78	74–63		76–59	71–76	67–81	85–82	85–78		
Kirolbet Baskonia		79–80		87–86	84–73		75–58	—	83–69	80–92	73–77	105–82	89–91		74–82		77–78	85–74
Monbus Obradoiro	86–92	97–83			82–73			79–92	—	78–77	75–73	78–57	76–83	98–96	73–76	72–83		86–83
Montakit Fuenlabrada	90–94	87–83		95–98	69–85			92–98		—		93–85			76–87	75–74	81–82	70–81
MoraBanc Andorra	86–84		106–78	90–76		60–70	76–86	97–82	93–69	79–69	—	69–65			87–74	86–89	89–73	
Movistar Estudiantes	67–74	87–79	67–85			82–78	72–74				79–87	—	72–87		76–78	91–70	78–68	73–77
Real Madrid		94–74	92–70	83–86	93–69	92–76		94–95		89–64	91–60		—		104–93	97–69	82–71	85–78
RETAbet Bilbao Basket		88–77			75–69	90–97		79–75	99–72	92–80	82–87	87–80	82–81	—			98–95	83–79
San Pablo Burgos	80–82	79–65	69–78	92–89	85–72		54–70			89–85	93–88 (Note: Result modified by the competition court. The match originally ended 94–88.)			93–95	—	92–82	77–60	62–93
UCAM Murcia	83–87		89–73		90–78			75–86	90–95	94–71	72–87			56–57		—	82–74	97–95
Unicaja			75–81	77–65	79–71	79–76	80–88	82–72	85–67			62–67	88–92	77–70			—	
Valencia Basket			92–74	100–70	95–72	86–88	98–91		86–76		89–68	79–63		78–81	95–66	82–62	63–79	—

Source: ACB
Legend: Blue = home team win; Red = away team win.

== Playoffs ==
=== Group stage ===
==== Group A ====
Pos	Team	Pld	W	L	PF	PA	PD	Qualification	BAR	KBA	UNI	IBT	JOV	RBB
1	Barça	5	4	1	432	400	+32	Qualification to the semifinals	—	81–75	—	86–87	96–92	—
2	Kirolbet Baskonia	5	3	2	402	379	+23	Qualification to the semifinals	—	—	87–86	79–72	—	—
3	Unicaja	5	3	2	418	395	+23		73–84	—	—	—	—	78–65
4	Iberostar Tenerife	5	2	3	381	406	−25		—	—	70–83	—	82–80	70–78
5	Club Joventut Badalona	5	2	3	423	429	−6		—	76–74	89–98	—	—	—
6	RETAbet Bilbao Basket	5	1	4	359	406	−47		73–85	64–87	—	—	79–86	—

Source: ACB

==== Group B ====
Pos	Team	Pld	W	L	PF	PA	PD	Qualification	VBC	BUR	RMB	HGC	MBA	ZGZ
1	Valencia Basket (H)	5	4	1	460	411	+49	Qualification to the semifinals	—	94–90	—	—	—	89–71
2	San Pablo Burgos	5	3	2	444	440	+4	Qualification to the semifinals	—	—	87–83	—	88–86	—
3	Real Madrid	5	3	2	441	429	+12		95–90	—	—	91–73	—	97–88
4	Herbalife Gran Canaria	5	2	3	425	448	−23		81–97	91–87	—	—	—	—
5	MoraBanc Andorra	5	2	3	452	450	+2		74–90	—	91–75	88–104	—	—
6	Casademont Zaragoza	5	1	4	423	467	−44		—	86–92	—	85–76	93–113	—

Source: ACB
(H) Hosts

=== Final Four ===
Semifinals
Barça	98
San Pablo Burgos	84
Valencia Basket	73
Kirolbet Baskonia	75

Final
Barça	67
Kirolbet Baskonia	69

== Final standings ==
Pos	Team	Pld	W	L	Qualification
1	Kirolbet Baskonia (C)	30	17	13	Already qualified to EuroLeague
2	Barça	30	24	6	Already qualified to EuroLeague
3	Valencia Basket	29	16	13	Already qualified to EuroLeague
4	San Pablo Burgos	29	15	14	Qualification to Champions League regular season
5	Real Madrid	28	21	7	Already qualified to EuroLeague
6	Casademont Zaragoza	28	17	11	Qualification to Champions League regular season
7	Iberostar Tenerife	27	16	11	Qualification to Champions League regular season
8	RETAbet Bilbao Basket	28	15	13	Qualification to Champions League regular season
9	MoraBanc Andorra	28	15	13	Qualification to EuroCup
10	Unicaja	28	15	13	Qualification to EuroCup
11	Herbalife Gran Canaria	27	13	14	Qualification to EuroCup
12	Club Joventut Badalona	28	11	17	Qualification to EuroCup
13	Baxi Manresa	23	9	14	
14	Monbus Obradoiro	23	9	14	
15	Coosur Real Betis	23	8	15	
16	UCAM Murcia	22	7	15	
17	Montakit Fuenlabrada	22	5	17	
18	Movistar Estudiantes	23	5	18	

Source: ACB
(C) Champions

== Attendances ==
Attendances only include regular season games:

Pos	Team	Total	High	Low	Average	Change
1	San Pablo Burgos	113,258	9,583	9,214	9,438	+3.1%
2	Casademont Zaragoza	112,451	10,510	8,078	9,371	+18.6%
3	Movistar Estudiantes	99,813	13,165	7,312	9,074	+5.4%
4	Kirolbet Baskonia	107,170	11,589	7,625	8,931	−2.4%
5	RETAbet Bilbao Basket	93,502	10,001	7,333	8,500	+28.0%^{1}
6	Real Madrid	97,027	9,852	6,922	8,086	−7.3%
7	Unicaja	77,683	10,020	6,805	7,768	+2.6%
8	Valencia Basket	85,157	7,783	6,678	7,096	−2.4%
9	Herbalife Gran Canaria	67,342	7,271	5,364	6,122	+16.3%
10	Barça	62,619	7,387	4,005	5,693	+7.0%
11	Club Joventut Badalona	66,599	9,328	3,912	5,550	+6.3%
12	UCAM Murcia	55,096	6,877	5,014	5,510	−1.7%
13	Coosur Real Betis	58,534	6,824	3,722	5,321	+139.5%^{1}
14	Montakit Fuenlabrada	51,788	5,589	4,896	5,179	+1.3%
15	Monbus Obradoiro	61,245	5,964	4,579	5,104	+4.1%
16	Iberostar Tenerife	58,470	5,211	4,061	4,873	+6.4%
17	Baxi Manresa	54,180	5,000	3,740	4,515	−4.0%
18	MoraBanc Andorra	47,888	4,523	3,194	3,991	−1.4%
	League total	1,369,822	13,165	3,194	6,682	+7.2%

Source: ACB
Notes:
1: Team played last season in LEB Oro.

== Awards ==
All official awards of the 2019–20 ACB season.

=== MVP ===
Pos.	Player	Team
PF	(Spain) Nikola Mirotić	Barça

=== Finals MVP ===
Pos.	Player	Team
PG	(Argentina) Luca Vildoza	Kirolbet Baskonia

=== All-ACB Teams ===
Pos.	First Team		Second Team	
Pos.	Player	Team	Player	Team
PG	(Argentina) Facundo Campazzo	Real Madrid	(Brazil) Marcelo Huertas	Iberostar Tenerife
SG	(Slovenia) Klemen Prepelič	Club Joventut Badalona	(Spain) Alberto Abalde	Valencia Basket
SF	(France) Axel Bouteille	Unicaja	(Hungary) Ádám Hanga	Barça
PF	(Spain) Nikola Mirotić	Barça	(Georgia (country)) Tornike Shengelia	Kirolbet Baskonia
C	(Georgia (country)) Giorgi Shermadini	Iberostar Tenerife	(Cape Verde) Edy Tavares	Real Madrid

=== Best Young Player Award ===
Player	Team
(Spain) Carlos Alocén	Casademont Zaragoza

=== Best All-Young Team ===
Player	Team
(Spain) Carlos Alocén	Casademont Zaragoza
(Spain) Usman Garuba	Real Madrid
(North Macedonia) Nenad Dimitrijević	Club Joventut Badalona
(Lithuania) Arnoldas Kulboka	RETAbet Bilbao Basket
(Czech Republic) Vít Krejčí	Casademont Zaragoza

=== Player of the round ===
Round	Player	Team	PIR
1	(Spain) Nikola Mirotić	Barça	39
2	(Uganda) Brandon Davies	Barça	35
3	(United States) Earl Clark	San Pablo Burgos	30
4	(Spain) Nikola Mirotić (2)	Barça	43
5	(United States) D. J. Seeley	Casademont Zaragoza	30
6	(United States) Fletcher Magee	Monbus Obradoiro	33
7	(United States) Omar Cook	Herbalife Gran Canaria	34
8	(Georgia (country)) Tornike Shengelia	Kirolbet Baskonia	32
9	(United States) Earl Clark (2)	San Pablo Burgos	28
10	(Georgia (country)) Giorgi Shermadini	Iberostar Tenerife	35
11	(Spain) Xabier López-Arostegui	Club Joventut Badalona	25
12	(Spain) Jaime Fernández	Unicaja	38
12	(Georgia (country)) Giorgi Shermadini (2)	Iberostar Tenerife	38
13	(France) Axel Bouteille	RETAbet Bilbao Basket	39
14	(Georgia (country)) Giorgi Shermadini (3)	Iberostar Tenerife	42
15	(Montenegro) Bojan Dubljević	Valencia Basket	29
15	(United States) Matt Costello	Herbalife Gran Canaria	29
16	(Slovenia) Alen Omić	Club Joventut Badalona	33
17	(Brazil) Marcelo Huertas	Iberostar Tenerife	35
18	(Georgia (country)) Giorgi Shermadini (4)	Iberostar Tenerife	31
19	(Montenegro) Nemanja Radović	Casademont Zaragoza	32
22	(Georgia (country)) Tornike Shengelia (2)	Kirolbet Baskonia	44
23	(United States) Erick Green	Coosur Real Betis	28

=== Player of the month ===
Month	Rounds	Player	Team	PIR	W–L	Ref
September	1–2	(Uganda) Brandon Davies	Barça	30.0	2–0	
October	3–6	(Spain) Nikola Mirotić	Barça	30.0	2–2	
November	7–10	(United States) Askia Booker	UCAM Murcia	23.7	2–2	
December	11–15	(Georgia (country)) Giorgi Shermadini	Iberostar Tenerife	24.6	3–2	
January	16–19	(Spain) Nikola Mirotić (2)	Barça	28.7	2–1	
February	20–21	(Georgia (country)) Tornike Shengelia	Kirolbet Baskonia	29.0	1–1	
March	22–23	(Georgia (country)) Tornike Shengelia (2)	Kirolbet Baskonia	30.5	2–0	

== ACB clubs in international competitions ==
Euroleague Basketball competitions
Team	Competition	Progress	Result
Real Madrid	EuroLeague	Regular season	2nd of 18 teams (22–6)
Barça	EuroLeague	Regular season	3rd of 18 teams (22–6)
Valencia Basket	EuroLeague	Regular season	10th of 18 teams (12–16)
Kirolbet Baskonia	EuroLeague	Regular season	13th of 18 teams (12–16)
Unicaja	EuroCup	Quarterfinals	11–5
Club Joventut Badalona	EuroCup	Top 16 Group H	3rd of 4 teams (8–8)
MoraBanc Andorra	EuroCup	Top 16 Group H	4th of 4 teams (8–8)

FIBA competitions
Team	Competition	Progress	Result
Iberostar Tenerife	Intercontinental Cup	Champions	2–0
Iberostar Tenerife	Champions League	Final Eight	
Casademont Zaragoza	Champions League	Final Eight	
San Pablo Burgos	Champions League	Final Eight	
Baxi Manresa	Champions League	Regular season Group A	5th of 8 teams (7–7)
