= Axel Bouteille =

French basketball player (born 1995)

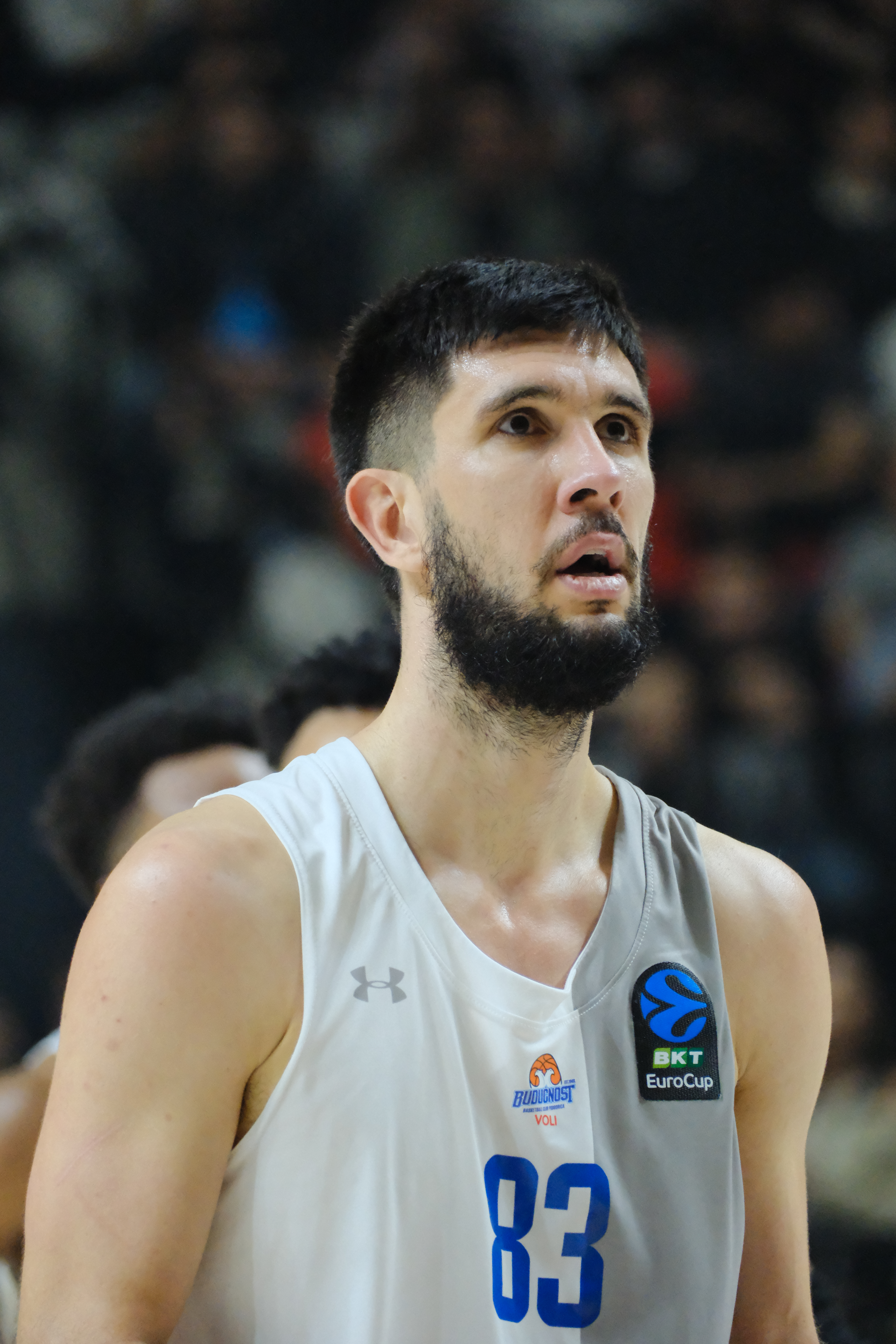
- Bouteille with Budućnost VOLI in 2026

No. 83 – Budućnost VOLI
- Position: Small forward
- League: Montenegrin League; ABA League

Personal information
- Born: 14 April 1995 (age 31) Roanne, Loire, France
- Listed height: 2.01 m (6 ft 7 in)
- Listed weight: 95 kg (209 lb)

Career information
- NBA draft: 2017: undrafted
- Playing career: 2013–present

Career history
- 2013–2017: Élan Chalon
- 2017–2019: Limoges CSP
- 2019–2020: Bilbao Basket
- 2020–2022: Unicaja
- 2022–2023: Türk Telekom
- 2023–2025: Bahçeşehir Koleji
- 2025–present: Budućnost VOLI

Career highlights
- All-EuroCup First Team (2023); All-ACB First Team (2020); Pro A champion (2017)

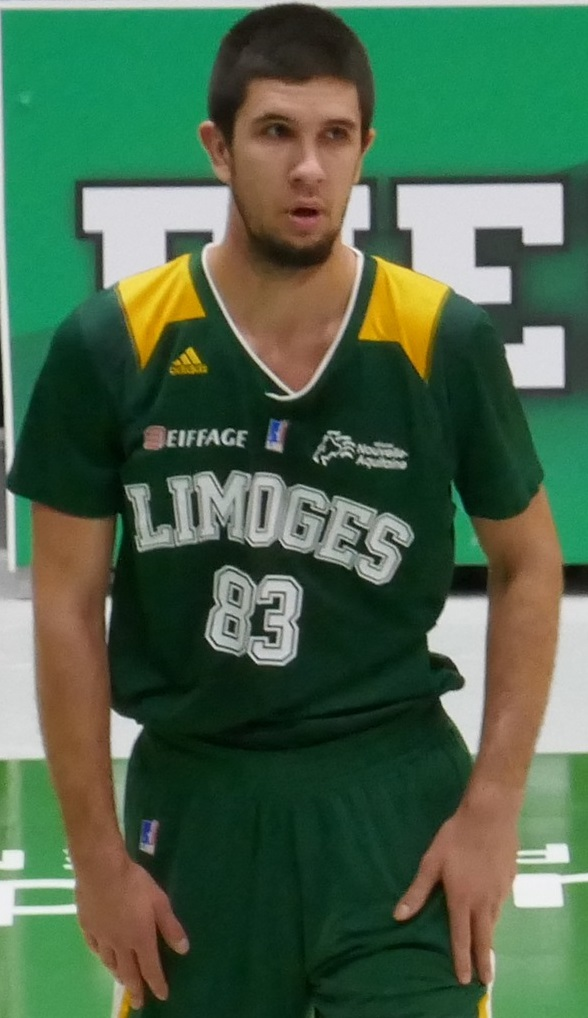
Bouteille with Limoges in 2017

Axel Bouteille (born 14 April 1995) is a French professional basketball player for Budućnost VOLI of the Prva A Liga and the Adriatic League. He is a 2.01 m (6 ft 7 in) tall small forward.

== Professional Career ==
Bouteille began his basketball career at the youth ranks of Hyères-Toulon before joining Élan Chalon when he was fifteen years old. He played his first matches in LNB Pro A during the 2013–14 season, where he averaged 1.5 points in four games. On 24 April 2016, Bouteille declared for the 2016 NBA draft, but was ultimately not selected.

After successful seasons with Èlan Chalon in the Pro A, Bouteille signed a two-year contract with CSP Limoges on 26 April 2017.

On 3 July 2019, his signing for Bilbao Basket was made official.

In February 2020, he joined Unicaja until the end of the 2021–22 season.

On 15 July 2022, Bouteille signed with Türk Telekom of the Basketbol Süper Ligi (BSL).

On 7 July 2023 he signed with Bahçeşehir Koleji of the Basketbol Süper Ligi (BSL).

On July 8, 2025, he signed with Budućnost VOLI of the Prva A Liga and the Adriatic League.

== National team career ==
As a member of the junior national teams of France, Bouteille played at the 2013 FIBA Europe Under-20 Championship, where the team finished fourth. He also played with the team at the 2014 FIBA Europe Under-20 Championship, and the 2015 FIBA Europe Under-20 Championship.

In April 2017, Bouteille was included in the preliminary squad for the EuroBasket 2017, but was omitted from the final selection.

== Personal life ==
He is the son of former professional basketball player Franck Bouteille.
