= Jonathan Rousselle =

French basketball player

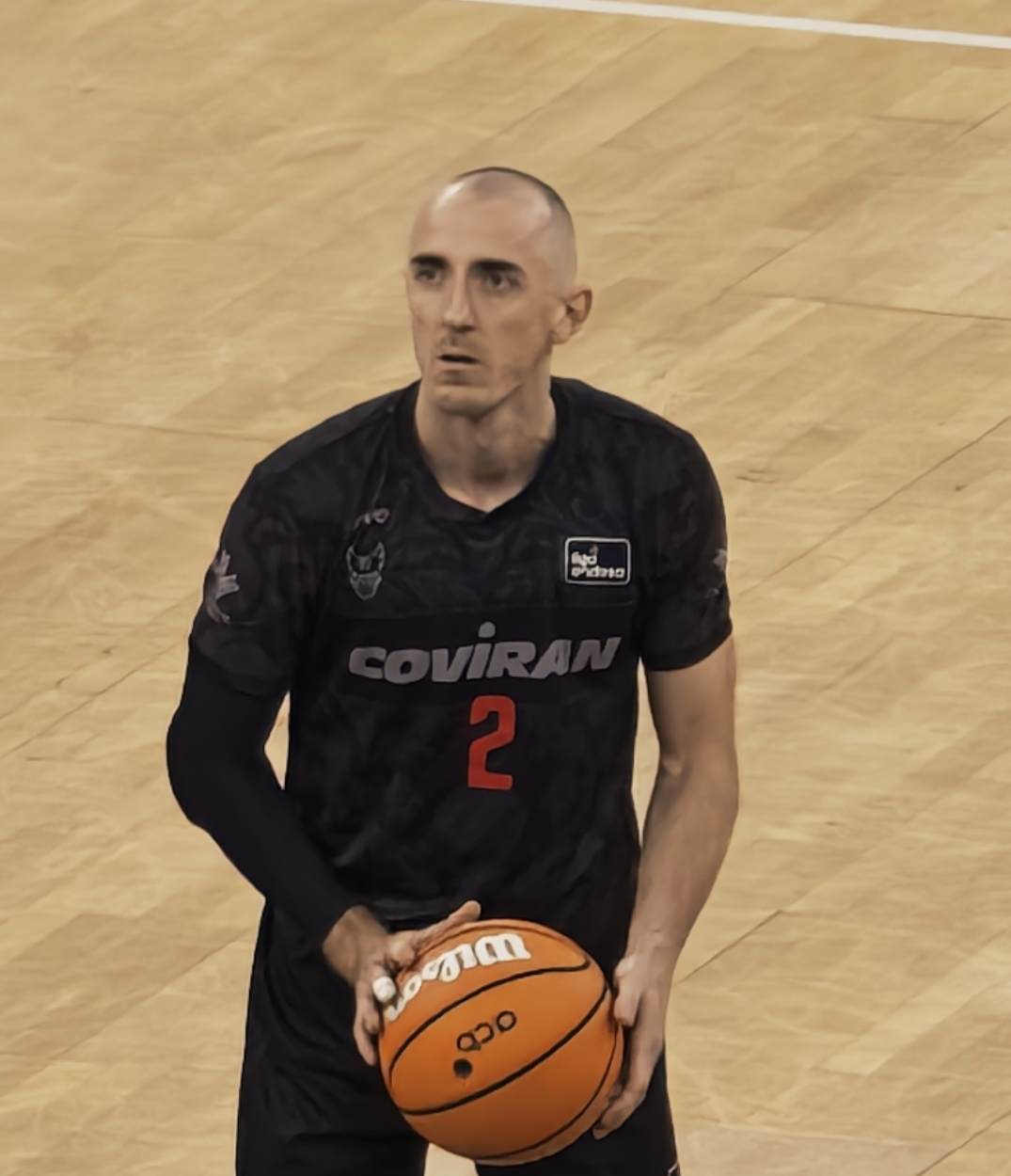
- Rousselle with Granada in 2025

No. 2 – Covirán Granada
- Position: Point guard
- League: Liga ACB

Personal information
- Born: 7 February 1990 (age 35) Seclin, France
- Listed height: 6 ft 4 in (1.93 m)
- Listed weight: 169 lb (77 kg)

Career information
- Playing career: 2008–present

Career history
- 2008–2011: BCM Gravelines
- 2011–2013: SOMB Boulogne-sur-Mer
- 2013–2014: BCM Gravelines
- 2014–2018: Cholet
- 2018–2019: Limoges CSP
- 2019–2022: Bilbao Basket
- 2022–2023: JDA Dijon
- 2023–present: Granada

Jonathan Rousselle (born 7 February 1990) is a French basketball player for Granada of the Liga ACB. Rousselle plays as a point guard.

== Professional career ==
He signed with Cholet in May 2014.

Rousselle averaged 7.6 points and 3.9 assists per game in 2019–20. He re-signed with RETAbet Bilbao Basket on 8 June 2020.

On 12 July 2022 he signed with JDA Dijon Basket of the LNB Pro A.

On 30 November 2023 he signed with Granada of the Liga ACB.
