= State Teachers and Agricultural College for Negroes (Georgia) =

School in Forsyth, Georgia (1902–1938)

State Teachers and Agricultural College of Forsyth
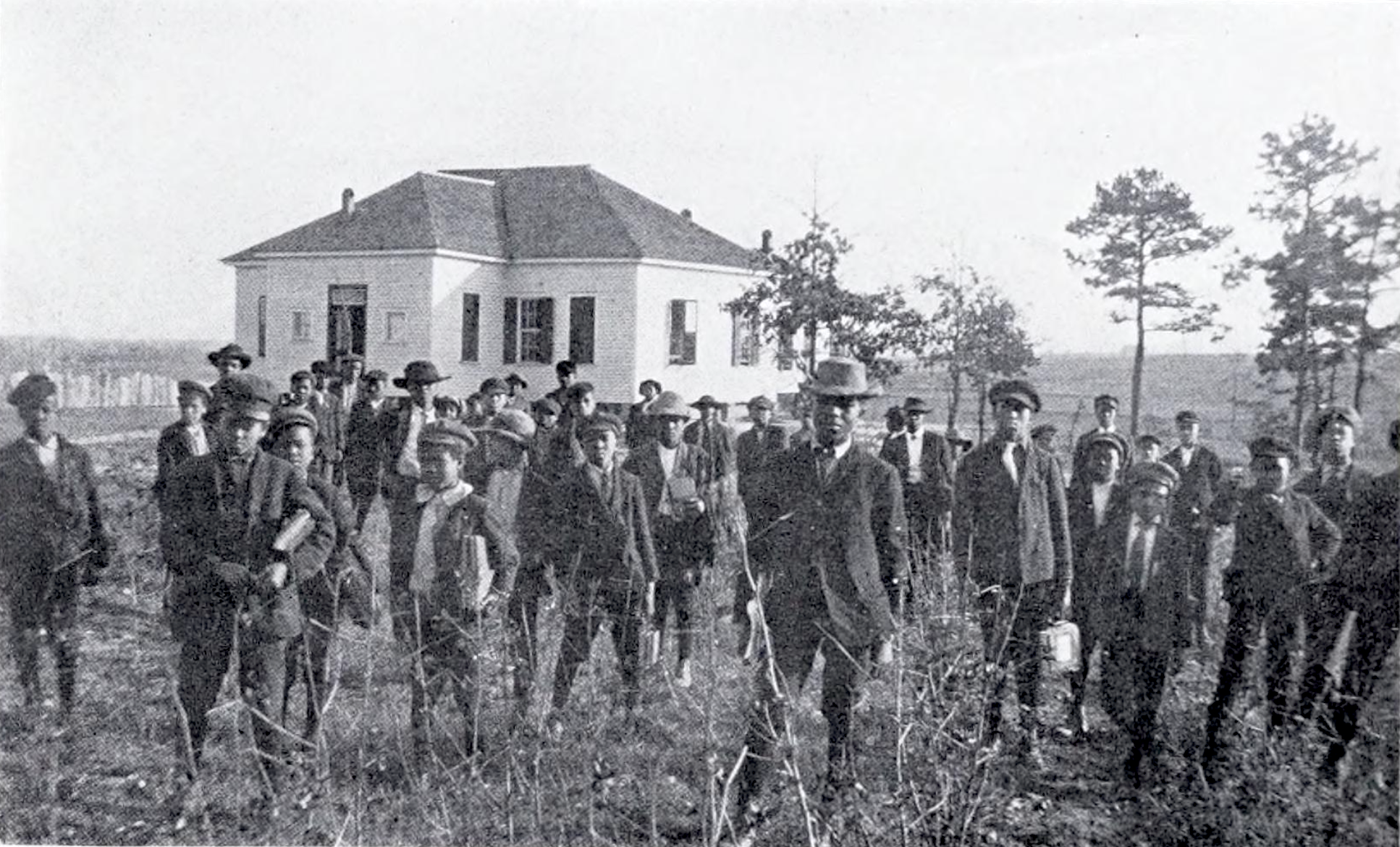
- Students, c. 1910

Location
- Martin Luther King Dr. (GA Route 83), Forsyth, Georgia, United States
- Coordinates: 33.023414°N 83.954347°W

Information
- Other name: Hubbard School, Hubbard Training School, State Teachers and Agricultural College of Forsyth
- Former names: Forsyth Normal and Industrial School (1902–1922), School of Agriculture and Mechanic Arts for the Training of Negroes (1922–1931), State Teachers and Agricultural College for Negroes (1931–1938)
- School type: Private Black elementary, secondary, vocational school, junior college, teacher training school
- Founded: 1902
- Founder: William Merida Hubbard
- Closed: 1938
- Affiliation: American Missionary Association; Daniel Hand Fund
- Followed by: Fort Valley State College

State Teachers and Agricultural College for Negroes (1902 – 1938) was a private school for African American students in Forsyth, Georgia. It was founded in 1902 as an elementary school for Black children by William Merida Hubbard. The school was accredited as vocational training school in 1918, the first in the State of Georgia. For the last 7 years it was the official school for the state for the instruction of African American teachers, and was then added to the University System of Georgia.

The school closed in 1938, and in 1939, the school was consolidated into Fort Valley State College (now Fort Valley State University) by the State of Georgia. The campus was reopened as the Hubbard Training School, a high school. It was also known as Forsyth Normal and Industrial School (1902–1922), and the School of Agriculture and Mechanic Arts for the Training of Negroes (1922–1931).

== History ==
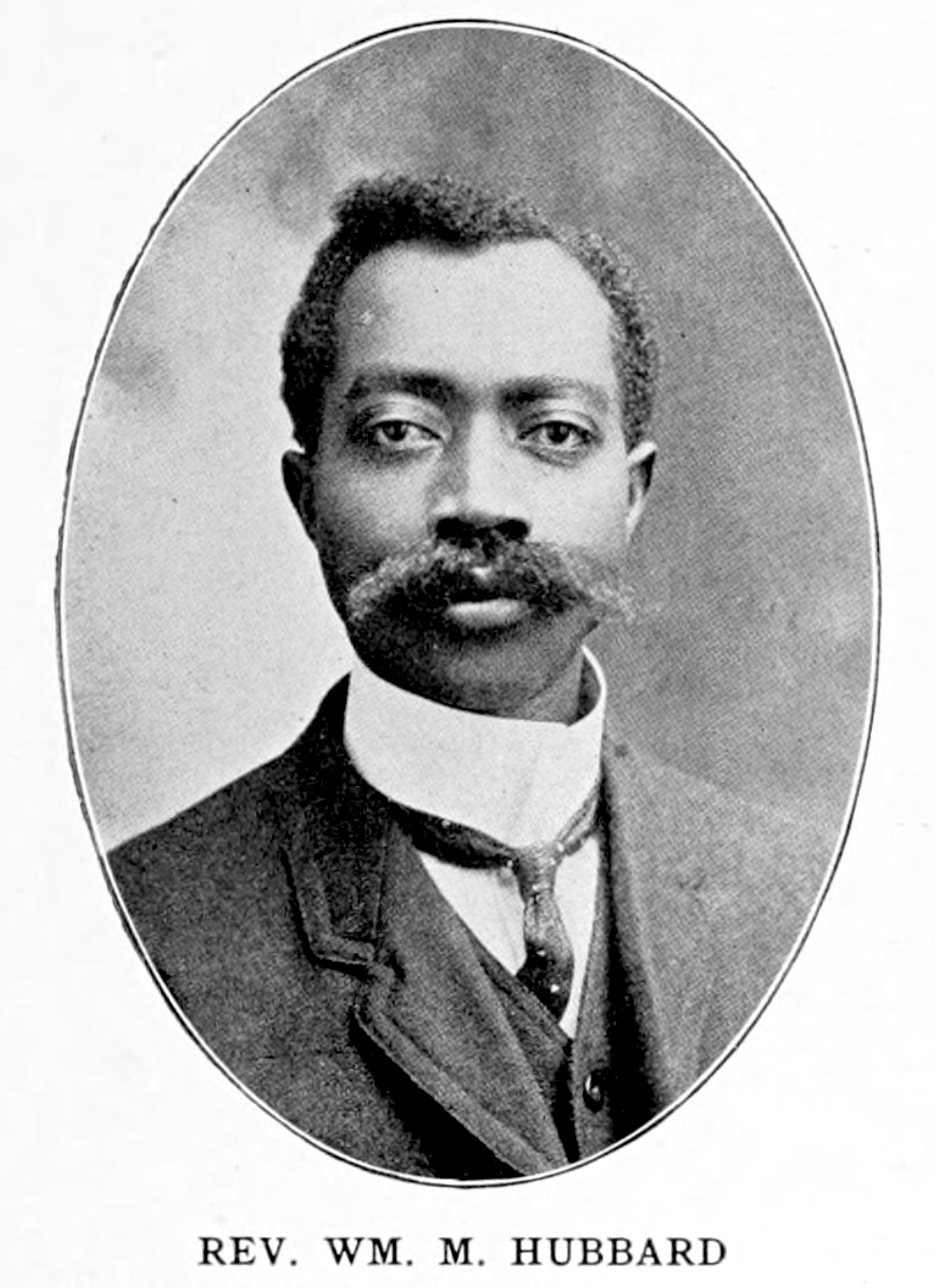
Rev. William Merida Hubbard, founder and principal

The State Teachers and Agricultural College of Forsyth was founded as the Forsyth Normal and Industrial School in 1902, a private Black school established by Rev. William Merida Hubbard (1865–1941), who also served as principal. Early funding for the school came from the American Missionary Association and the Daniel Hand Fund. The first class was held in a small church building with 7 students. Hubbard was able to work alongside white members of the community to erected a school building on 10 acres (4.0 ha).

In 1908, the school had 443 students and 6 teachers.

The grade range within the school was increased to the 11th grade in 1916. Two years later in 1918, the school was accredited as the first vocational school for African American students in Georgia. It was renamed School of Agriculture and Mechanic Arts for the Training of Negroes in 1922. For a brief few years in the 1920s the school was expanded to accommodate a junior college and an additional 2,000-plus students, however it was destroyed by a fire in 1927.

In 1931, the name was changed to the State Teachers and Agricultural College for Negroes, and it became a public school. It became an official school for the State of Georgia for the instruction of African American teachers between 1931 and 1938. By 1932, it was one of three African American public colleges added to the University System of Georgia.

== Closure and legacy ==
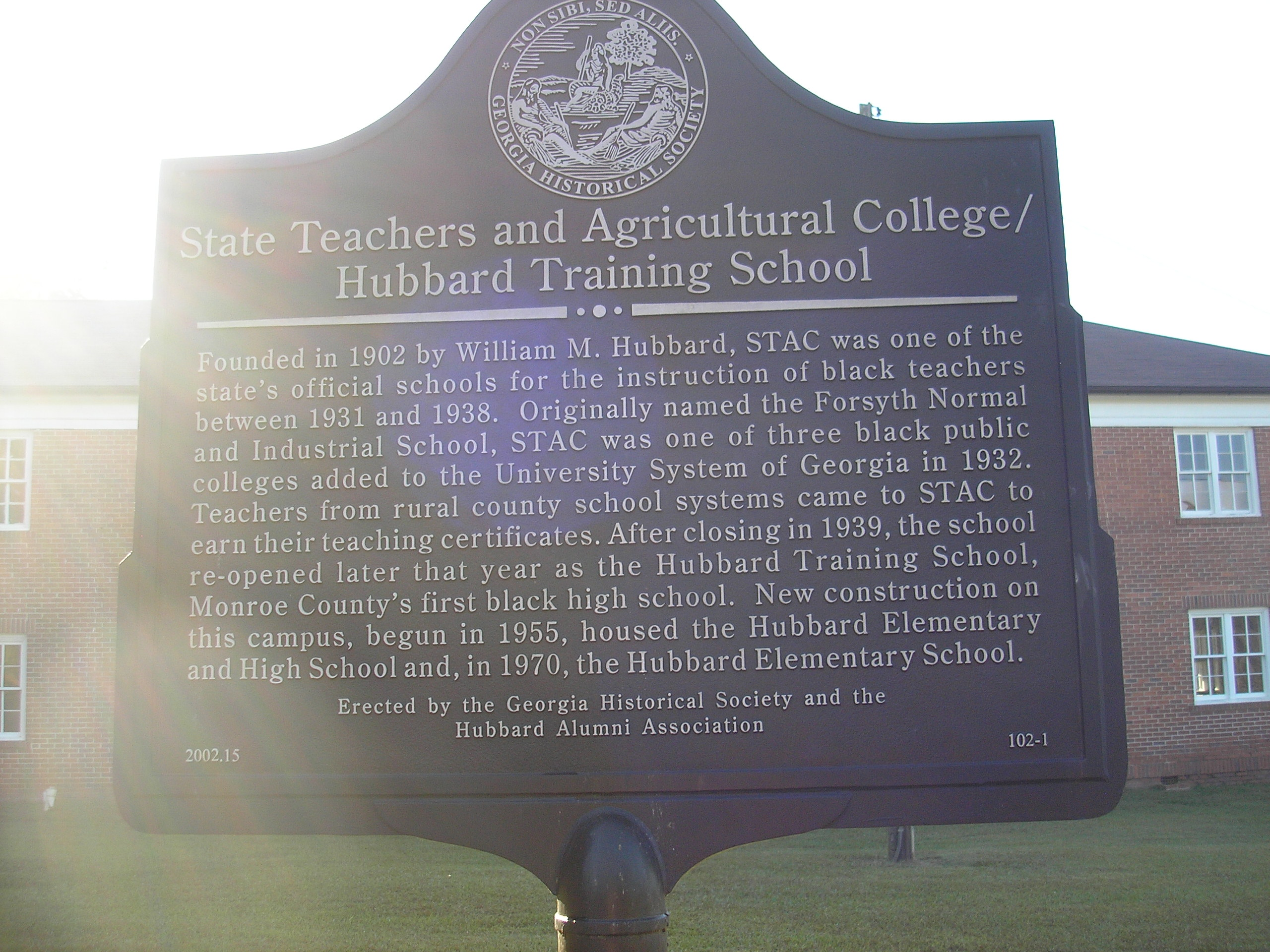
Historical marker

It closed in 1938, and in 1939 the State of Georgia took over the leadership of the school. The State Teachers and Agricultural College of Forsyth and the Fort Valley High and Industrial School were both consolidated at the same time to form the Fort Valley State College (now Fort Valley State University) with Horace Mann Bond as its president.

The former campus for the State Teachers and Agricultural College of Forsyth was given to the Monroe County Board of Education, and it was reopened as the Hubbard Training School, Monroe County’s first black high school led by Samuel Hubbard, the son of William Merida Hubbard. In 1955, the campus constructed Hubbard Elementary and High School, and in 1970 they added Hubbard Elementary School.

The site is contains a historical marker erected in 2002 by the Georgia Historical Society and the Hubbard Alumni Association, dedicated to the State Teachers and Agricultural College for Negroes and the Hubbard Training School.

The State Teachers and Agricultural College for Negroes Women's Dormitory and Teachers' Cottage (a former campus building) has been listed on the National Register of Historic Places since May 30, 2003.

== See also ==
- National Register of Historic Places listings in Monroe County, Georgia
