= 2016–17 Real Madrid Baloncesto season =

Real Madrid
2016–17 season
- Chairman: Florentino Pérez
- Head coach: Pablo Laso
- Arena: WiZink Center
- Liga ACB: 1st
- Playoffs: Runners-up
- EuroLeague: 4th
- Copa del Rey: Winners
- Supercopa de España: Semi-finals
| Home | Away |

The 2016–17 season was Real Madrid's 86th in existence, their 34th consecutive season in the top flight of Spanish basketball and 10th consecutive season in the top flight of European basketball. The club was involved in four competitions.

== Players ==
=== Squad information ===
Real Madrid roster
Players
Coaches

| Pos. | No. | Nat. | Name | Ht. | Wt. | Age |
|---|---|---|---|---|---|---|
| C | 14 | (Mexico) | Ayón, Gustavo | 2.08 m (6 ft 10 in) | 113 kg (249 lb) | 32 – 1 April 1985 |
| SG | 20 | (Azerbaijan) | Carroll, Jaycee | 1.88 m (6 ft 2 in) | 84 kg (185 lb) | 34 – 16 April 1983 |
| G/F | 7 | (Slovenia) | Dončić, Luka | 2.01 m (6 ft 7 in) | 99 kg (218 lb) | 18 – 28 February 1999 |
| PG | 4 | (Croatia) | Draper, Dontaye | 1.80 m (5 ft 11 in) | 84 kg (185 lb) | 32 – 10 August 1984 |
| G/F | 5 | (Spain) | Fernández, Rudy | 1.98 m (6 ft 6 in) | 84 kg (185 lb) | 32 – 4 April 1985 |
| C | 21 | (United States) | Hunter, Othello | 2.03 m (6 ft 8 in) | 107 kg (236 lb) | 31 – 28 May 1986 |
| G | 23 | (Spain) | Llull, Sergio | 1.92 m (6 ft 4 in) | 95.4 kg (210 lb) | 29 – 15 November 1987 |
| SF | 8 | (Lithuania) | Mačiulis, Jonas | 2.01 m (6 ft 7 in) | 107 kg (236 lb) | 32 – 10 February 1985 |
| F | 6 | (Argentina) | Nocioni, Andrés | 2.03 m (6 ft 8 in) | 102 kg (225 lb) | 37 – 30 November 1979 |
| C | 3 | (Slovenia) | Randolph, Anthony | 2.11 m (6 ft 11 in) | 104 kg (229 lb) | 27 – 15 July 1989 |
| F/C | 9 | (Spain) | Reyes, Felipe (C) | 2.06 m (6 ft 9 in) | 118 kg (260 lb) | 37 – 16 March 1980 |
| PF | 36 | (Spain) | Suárez, Álex | 2.06 m (6 ft 9 in) | 101 kg (223 lb) | 23 – 27 September 1993 |
| G/F | 44 | (Sweden) | Taylor, Jeffery | 2.01 m (6 ft 7 in) | 102 kg (225 lb) | 28 – 23 May 1989 |
| PF | 33 | (United States) | Thompkins, Trey | 2.08 m (6 ft 10 in) | 111 kg (245 lb) | 27 – 29 May 1990 |

Head coach

- (Spain) Pablo Laso

Assistant coach(es)

- (Spain) Jesús Mateo
- (Spain) Francisco Redondo

Fitness trainer(s)

- (Spain) Juan Trapero

Legend

- (C) Team captain
- Injured

- Roster
Updated: October 8, 2016

=== Depth chart ===
| Pos. | Starting 5 | Bench 1 | Bench 2 | Bench 3 |
|---|---|---|---|---|
| C | Gustavo Ayón | Felipe Reyes | | Othello Hunter |
| PF | Anthony Randolph | Andrés Nocioni | Trey Thompkins | Álex Suárez |
| SF | Rudy Fernández | Jonas Mačiulis | Jeffery Taylor |
| SG | Jaycee Carroll | Luka Dončić |
| PG | Sergio Llull | Dontaye Draper |

Colours: Blue = homegrown player; Red = non–FIBA Europe player

=== Players in ===
| No. | Pos. | Nat. | Name | Age | Moving from | | Type | Ends | Transfer fee | Date | Source |
|---|---|---|---|---|---|---|---|---|---|---|---|
| 3 | PF | (Slovenia) | Anthony Randolph | 27 | Lokomotiv Kuban | (Russia) | End of contract | 2017 | Free | 15 July 2016 | |
| 4 | PG | (Croatia) | Dontaye Draper | 31 | Lokomotiv Kuban | (Russia) | End of contract | 2017 | Free | 20 July 2016 | |
| 21 | C | (United States) | Othello Hunter | 30 | Olympiacos | (Greece) | End of contract | 2018 | Free | 29 August 2016 | |
| 36 | PF | (Spain) | Álex Suárez | 22 | Bilbao Basket | (Spain) | Loan return | 2018 | Free | | |

Total spending: ▼€0

=== Players out ===
| No. | Pos. | Nat. | Name | Age | Moving to | | Type | Transfer fee | Date | Source |
|---|---|---|---|---|---|---|---|---|---|---|
| 41 | C | (Spain) | Willy Hernangómez | 22 | New York Knicks | (United States) | End of contract | Free | 8 July 2016 | |
| 13 | PG | (Spain) | Sergio Rodríguez | 30 | Philadelphia 76ers | (United States) | Transfer | Undisclosed | 13 July 2016 | |
| 4 | PF | (Senegal) | Maurice Ndour | 24 | New York Knicks | (United States) | End of contract | Free | 14 July 2016 | |
| 3 | G | (United States) | K. C. Rivers | 29 | Panathinaikos | (Greece) | End of contract | Free | 24 July 2016 | |
| 22 | C | (Brazil) | Augusto Lima | 24 | Žalgiris | (Lithuania) | Loan | Free | 29 July 2016 | |

Total income: ▲€0

Total expenditure: €0

== Club ==
=== Technical staff ===
| Position | Staff |
|---|---|
| Head coach | Pablo Laso |
| Assistant coach | Jesús Mateo; Francisco Redondo |
| Fitness trainer | Juan Trapero |

Source: Real Madrid

=== Kit ===
Supplier: Adidas / Sponsor: Teka

| Home | Away |

== Pre-season and friendlies ==
Win Loss

| 16 September 2016 1 | Real Madrid (Spain) | 87–90 | (Turkey) Fenerbahçe | Cártama, Spain |
| 20:00 (CEST) | Scoring by quarter: 20–22, 25–25, 13–27, 29–16 |
| | Pts: Dončić 19; Rebs: Ayón 8 Asts: Dončić 4 PIR: Dončić 22 | Boxscore | Pts: Dixon 22; Rebs: Udoh 8 Asts: Sloukas 7 PIR: Dixon 27 | Arena: Pabellón Municipal de Cártama; Attendance: 1,500; Referees: Morales, Muñoz, López |

| 17 September 2016 2 | Unicaja (Spain) | 78–83 | (Spain) Real Madrid | Torremolinos, Spain |
| | Scoring by quarter: 11–23, 26–23, 23–17, 18–20 |
| | Pts: Musli 15; Rebs: Musli 8 Asts: Lafayette 6 PIR: Musli 20 | Boxscore | Pts: Dončić 16; Rebs: Randolph, Reyes 6 Asts: Ayón, Draper 4 PIR: Dončić 26 | Arena: Palacio San Miguel de Torremolinos; Attendance: 1,500; Referees: Hierrezuelo, Jiménez, Conde |

| 3 October 2016 3 | Real Madrid (Spain) | 142–137(OT) | (United States) Oklahoma City Thunder | Madrid, Spain |
| 20:30 (CEST) | Scoring by quarter: 22–35, 28–30, 37–30, 39–31, Overtime: 16–11 |
| | Pts: Carroll 24; Rebs: Nocioni, Randolph 6 Asts: Llull 9 | Boxscore | Pts: Oladipo 34; Rebs: Kanter 10; Asts: Oladipo 5 | Arena: Barclaycard Center; Attendance: 12,414; Referees: Globe, Boland, Radović |

== Competitions ==
=== Overall ===
| Competition | Started round | Current position / round | Final position / round | First match | Last match |
|---|---|---|---|---|---|
| Liga ACB | Matchday 1 | 2nd | – | 30 September 2016 | 14 May 2017 |
| EuroLeague | Matchday 1 | 1st | 4th | 12 October 2016 | 7 April 2017 |
| Copa del Rey | Quarterfinals | — | Winners | 16 February 2017 | 19 February 2017 |
| Supercopa de España | Semifinals | — | Semifinalists | 23 September 2016 | |

Updated to match played February 24, 2017
Source: Competitions

=== Overview ===
| Competition | Record | | | | | | | |
| Competition | Pld | W | D | L | PF | PA | PD | Win % |
|---|---|---|---|---|---|---|---|---|
| Liga ACB | 26 | 19 | 0 | 7 | 2,265 | 2,038 | +227 | 73.08 |
| EuroLeague | 30 | 23 | 0 | 7 | 2,585 | 2,353 | +232 | 76.67 |
| Copa del Rey | 3 | 3 | 0 | 0 | 299 | 287 | +12 | 100.00 |
| Supercopa de España | 1 | 0 | 0 | 1 | 93 | 99 | −6 | 0.00 |
| Total | 60 | 45 | 0 | 15 | 5,242 | 4,777 | +465 | 75.00 |

Last updated: March 3, 2017
Source: Competitions

=== Supercopa de España ===
Win Loss

| 23 September 2016 Semifinals | Real Madrid | 93–99 | FC Barcelona Lassa | Vitoria-Gasteiz |
| 21:30 (CEST) | Scoring by quarter: 26–26, 22–21, 22–26, 23–26 |
| | Pts: Llull 27; Rebs: Dončić 8 Asts: Fernández 5 PIR: Llull 22 | Boxscore | Pts: Rice 30; Rebs: Tomić 8 Asts: Rice 6 PIR: Rice 34 | Arena: Fernando Buesa Arena; Attendance: 9,257; Referees: García González, Jiménez, Peruga |

=== Liga ACB ===
==== League table ====
| Pos | Team | Pld | W | L | PF | PA | PD | Qualification or relegation |
|---|---|---|---|---|---|---|---|---|
| 1 | Real Madrid | 32 | 25 | 7 | 2803 | 2500 | +303 | Qualification to playoffs |
| 2 | Baskonia | 32 | 23 | 9 | 2697 | 2445 | +252 | Qualification to playoffs |
| 3 | Valencia Basket | 32 | 23 | 9 | 2639 | 2398 | +241 | Qualification to playoffs |
| 4 | Unicaja | 32 | 22 | 10 | 2661 | 2495 | +166 | Qualification to playoffs |
| 5 | Iberostar Tenerife | 32 | 22 | 10 | 2466 | 2277 | +189 | Qualification to playoffs |

Source: ACB

==== Results summary ====
| Overall | | | | | | Home | | | | | Away | | | | |
| Pld | W | L | PF | PA | PD | W | L | PF | PA | PD | W | L | PF | PA | PD |
|---|---|---|---|---|---|---|---|---|---|---|---|---|---|---|---|
| 26 | 19 | 7 | 2265 | 2038 | +227 | 12 | 1 | 1198 | 995 | +203 | 7 | 6 | 1067 | 1043 | +24 |

Last updated: April 8, 2017.
Source: Competitive matches

==== Results by round ====
| Round | 1 | 2 | 3 | 4 | 5 | 6 | 7 | 8 | 9 | 10 | 11 | 12 | 13 | 14 | 15 | 16 | 17 | 18 | 19 | 20 | 21 | 22 | 23 | 24 | 25 | 26 | 27 | 28 | 29 | 30 | 31 | 32 | 33 | 34 |
|---|---|---|---|---|---|---|---|---|---|---|---|---|---|---|---|---|---|---|---|---|---|---|---|---|---|---|---|---|---|---|---|---|---|---|
| Ground | H | A | R | H | A | H | A | H | A | H | H | A | H | A | A | H | A | H | R | A | A | H | A | H | A | H | A | H | H | A | H | A | H | A |
| Result | W | W | R | W | W | W | L | W | W | W | W | W | W | L | L | W | W | W | R | W | L | L | L | W | L | W | W | W | W | W | W | W | W | W |
| Position | 4 | 1 | 3 | 3 | 1 | 1 | 2 | 1 | 1 | 1 | 1 | 1 | 1 | 1 | 1 | 1 | 1 | 1 | 1 | 1 | 1 | 2 | 3 | 2 | 3 | 3 | 3 | 2 | | | | | | |

Last updated: April 10, 2017.
Source: Competitive matches
Ground: A = Away; H = Home; R = Rest. Result: L = Loss; W = Win; R = Rest; P = Postponed.

==== Matches ====
Win Loss

| 30 September 2016 1 | Real Madrid | 101–90 | Unicaja | Madrid |
| 20:00 (CEST) | Scoring by quarter: 26–24, 31–26, 14–23, 30–17 |
| | Pts: Ayón 16; Rebs: Randolph 7 Asts: Llull 9 PIR: Ayón, Llull 20 | Boxscore | Pts: Musli 14; Rebs: Suárez 7 Asts: Nedović 5 PIR: Suárez 21 | Arena: Barclaycard Center; Attendance: 9,145; Referees: Martín Bertrán, Cortés, Aliaga |

| 6 October 2016 2 | Valencia Basket | 75–94 | Real Madrid | Valencia |
| 20:00 (CEST) | Scoring by quarter: 17–23, 19–19, 18–34, 21–18 |
| | Pts: three players 12; Rebs: Sikma 9 Asts: Vives 7 PIR: Thomas 18 | Boxscore | Pts: Llull 18; Rebs: Hunter 9 Asts: Llull 8 PIR: Llull 27 | Arena: Fuente de San Luis; Attendance: 8,500; Referees: Pérez Pérez, Araña, Fernández |

| 16 October 2016 4 | Real Madrid | 93–86 | UCAM Murcia | Madrid |
| 18:30 (CEST) | Scoring by quarter: 22–19, 20–17, 26–28, 25–22 |
| | Pts: Llull 23; Rebs: Reyes 8 Asts: Fernández, Llull 5 PIR: Llull 27 | Boxscore | Pts: Benite, Campazzo 19; Rebs: Delía 7 Asts: Campazzo 14; PIR: Campazzo 26 | Arena: Barclaycard Center; Attendance: 9,028; Referees: Hierrezuelo, Perea, Rial |

| 23 October 2016 5 | Movistar Estudiantes | 88–96 | Real Madrid | Madrid |
| 18:30 (CEST) | Scoring by quarter: 17–22, 25–15, 26–33, 20–26 |
| | Pts: Jackson 21; Rebs: Traoré 6 Asts: Cook 5 PIR: Jackson 25 | Boxscore | Pts: Carroll 24; Rebs: Ayón 11; Asts: Llull 4 PIR: Randolph 26 | Arena: Barclaycard Center; Attendance: 13,570; Referees: Pérez Pizarro, Manuel, Serrano |

| 30 October 2016 6 | Real Madrid | 94–68 | Tecnyconta Zaragoza | Madrid |
| 12:30 (CET) | Scoring by quarter: 21–21, 16–16, 25–11, 32–20 |
| | Pts: Carroll 19; Rebs: Ayón 9 Asts: Llull 5 PIR: Reyes 23 | Boxscore | Pts: Benzing 23; Rebs: Fotu 10; Asts: Bellas 3 PIR: Fotu 22 | Arena: Barclaycard Center; Attendance: 9,445; Referees: Bultó, Oyón, Caballero |

| 6 November 2016 7 | FC Barcelona Lassa | 85–75 | Real Madrid | Barcelona |
| 18:30 (CET) | Scoring by quarter: 20–15, 29–18, 18–20, 18–22 |
| | Pts: Tomić 19; Rebs: Tomić 7 Asts: Tomić 5 PIR: Tomić 33 | Boxscore | Pts: Draper 13; Rebs: Randolph 8 Asts: Mačiulis 5 PIR: Hunter 16 | Arena: Palau Blaugrana; Attendance: 6,581; Referees: García González, Calatrava, Munar |

| 13 November 2016 8 | Real Madrid | 86–59 | Iberostar Tenerife | Madrid |
| 12:30 (CET) | Scoring by quarter: 23–19, 23–13, 20–14, 20–13 |
| | Pts: Ayón, Carroll 14; Rebs: Ayón, Hunter 7 Asts: Llull 6 PIR: Dončić 21 | Boxscore | Pts: Doornekamp 11; Rebs: Beirán 7 Asts: four players 2 PIR: Vázquez 13 | Arena: Barclaycard Center; Attendance: 6,596; Referees: Conde, Araña, Cardús |

| 20 November 2016 9 | Herbalife Gran Canaria | 68–76 | Real Madrid | Las Palmas |
| 18:30 (CET) | Scoring by quarter: 17–21, 22–16, 17–18, 12–21 |
| | Pts: Kuric 15; Rebs: Hendrix 9 Asts: Oliver 4 PIR: Pasečņiks 12 | Boxscore | Pts: Llull 13; Rebs: Reyes 10; Asts: Llull 7 PIR: Ayón 19 | Arena: Gran Canaria Arena; Attendance: 8,661; Referees: Jiménez Trujillo, Castillo, Oyón |

| 27 November 2016 10 | Real Madrid | 96–70 | ICL Manresa | Madrid |
| 18:30 (CET) | Scoring by quarter: 25–17, 16–19, 33–15, 22–19 |
| | Pts: Llull 24; Rebs: Ayón 11; Asts: Dončić 7 PIR: Llull 37 | Boxscore | Pts: Čakarun, Trapani 13; Rebs: Čakarun, Trapani 6 Asts: Montañez 3 PIR: Čakarun 18 | Arena: Barclaycard Center; Attendance: 8,214; Referees: Pérez Pérez, Manuel, Mas Cagide |

| 4 December 2016 11 | Real Madrid | 92–76 | Montakit Fuenlabrada | Madrid |
| 12:30 (CET) | Scoring by quarter: 23–12, 24–20, 24–19, 21–25 |
| | Pts: Dončić 23; Rebs: Reyes 8 Asts: Dončić 11; PIR: Dončić 34 | Boxscore | Pts: Rey 16; Rebs: Rey 8 Asts: Håkanson 4 PIR: Rey 21 | Arena: Barclaycard Center; Attendance: 8,412; Referees: Peruga, Sánchez Monserrat, Serrano |

| 11 December 2016 12 | RETAbet Bilbao Basket | 77–85 | Real Madrid | Bilbao |
| 18:30 (CET) | Scoring by quarter: 13–22, 25–26, 24–17, 15–20 |
| | Pts: Buva 23; Rebs: Bamforth 6 Asts: Mumbrú 6 PIR: Buva 21 | Boxscore | Pts: Ayón 14; Rebs: Reyes 7 Asts: Dončić 4 PIR: Ayón 19 | Arena: Bilbao Arena; Attendance: 9,833; Referees: Conde, García Ortiz, Martín Caballero |

| 18 December 2016 13 | Real Madrid | 106–59 | Rio Natura Monbus Obradoiro | Madrid |
| 12:30 (CET) | Scoring by quarter: 20–22, 28–18, 33–8, 25–11 |
| | Pts: Carroll 23; Rebs: Hunter 8 Asts: Fernández 8 PIR: Llull 22 | Boxscore | Pts: Allen 19; Rebs: Allen 6 Asts: Dulkys 6 PIR: Yusta 16 | Arena: WiZink Center; Attendance: 6,783; Referees: García González, Aliaga, Munar |

| 27 December 2016 14 | Real Betis Energía Plus | 86–85 | Real Madrid | Sevilla |
| 21:30 (CET) | Scoring by quarter: 23–28, 18–18, 19–23, 26–16 |
| | Pts: Lockett, Mahalbašić 16; Rebs: Lockett 6 Asts: three players 2 PIR: Lockett 23 | Boxscore | Pts: Llull 20; Rebs: Reyes 11; Asts: Llull 5 PIR: Reyes 20 | Arena: San Pablo; Attendance: 7,112; Referees: Pérez Pérez, Bultó, Mas Cagide |

| 3 January 2017 15 | Baskonia | 77–62 | Real Madrid | Vitoria-Gasteiz |
| 19:30 (CET) | Scoring by quarter: 20–19, 12–8, 33–15, 12–20 |
| | Pts: Hanga, Larkin 16; Rebs: Voigtmann 7 Asts: Hanga, Larkin 3 PIR: Hanga 18 | Boxscore | Pts: Dončić, Fernández 12; Rebs: Hunter 7 Asts: Llull 3 PIR: Randolph 19 | Arena: Fernando Buesa Arena; Attendance: 14,316; Referees: Pérez Pizarro, Calatrava, Martínez |

| 8 January 2017 16 | Real Madrid | 96–92(OT) | MoraBanc Andorra | Madrid |
| 18:30 (CET) | Scoring by quarter: 26–21, 7–23, 21–13, 25–22, Overtime: 17–13 |
| | Pts: Llull 23; Rebs: Ayón 15; Asts: Llull 11; PIR: Ayón 30 | Boxscore | Pts: Shermadini 21; Rebs: Shermadini 15; Asts: Albicy 10; PIR: Shermadini 44 | Arena: WiZink Center; Attendance: 8,295; Referees: Jiménez Trujillo, Araña, Zamorano |

| 15 January 2017 17 | Divina Seguros Joventut | 78–81 | Real Madrid | Badalona |
| 18:30 (CET) | Scoring by quarter: 20–17, 24–14, 17–23, 17–27 |
| | Pts: Bogdanović 16; Rebs: three players 4 Asts: Smith, Vidal 3 PIR: Jordan 20 | Boxscore | Pts: Reyes 18; Rebs: Dončić 7 Asts: Llull 6 PIR: Reyes 20 | Arena: Palau Municipal d'Esports; Attendance: 7,946; Referees: Hierrezuelo, Manuel, Pérez Niz |

| 22 January 2017 18 | Real Madrid | 85–71 | Valencia Basket | Madrid |
| 18:30 (CET) | Scoring by quarter: 16–21, 22–24, 26–8, 21–18 |
| | Pts: Llull 16; Rebs: Ayón 7 Asts: Llull 13; PIR: Fernández, Llull 21 | Boxscore | Pts: Vives 10; Rebs: Dubljević 10; Asts: Dubljević 3 PIR: Thomas 12 | Arena: WiZink Center; Attendance: 10,289; Referees: Conde, Calatrava, Rial |

| 5 February 2017 20 | UCAM Murcia | 61–89 | Real Madrid | Murcia |
| 18:30 (CET) | Scoring by quarter: 18–28, 9–20, 18–23, 16–18 |
| | Pts: Rojas 14; Rebs: Rojas 12; Asts: Campazzo, Rojas 3 PIR: Rojas 24 | Boxscore | Pts: Carroll 21; Rebs: Reyes 6 Asts: Llull 4 PIR: Carroll, Llull 24 | Arena: Palacio de Deportes; Attendance: 7,500; Referees: García González, Sánchez Monserrat, Munar |

| 12 February 2017 21 | Unicaja | 82–78 | Real Madrid | Málaga |
| 18:30 (CET) | Scoring by quarter: 19–21, 21–15, 18–17, 24–25 |
| | Pts: Nedović 25; Rebs: Brooks 9 Asts: Nedović 5 PIR: Brooks 23 | Boxscore | Pts: Randolph 18; Rebs: Randolph 11; Asts: Llull 9 PIR: Randolph 27 | Arena: Martín Carpena; Attendance: 10,473; Referees: Martín Bertrán, Araña, Sacristán |

| 26 February 2017 22 | Real Madrid | 81–93 | Herbalife Gran Canaria | Madrid |
| 18:30 (CET) | Scoring by quarter: 9-23, 24-21, 25-20, 23-29 |
| | Pts: Llull 28; Rebs: three players 4 Asts: Fernández 4 PIR: Llull 24 | Boxscore | Pts: Kuric 19; Rebs: Aguilar 8 Asts: Oliver 10; PIR: Oliver 19 | Arena: WiZink Center; Attendance: 9,301; Referees: M.A. Pérez Pérez, Jorge Martínez, Andrés Fernández |

| 4 March 2017 23 | Iberostar Tenerife | 75–64 | Real Madrid | San Cristóbal de La Laguna |
| 19:00 (CET) | Scoring by quarter: 26–24, 17–13, 14–15, 18–11 |
| | Pts: Doornekamp 17; Rebs: Mamadou Niang 7 Asts: San Miguel, White 3 PIR: Bogris 19 | Boxscore | Pts: Llull 15; Rebs: Fernández 9 Asts: Dončić 4 PIR: Dončić 22 | Arena: Santiago Martín; Attendance: 5,177; Referees: Jiménez Trujillo, Sergio Manuel, Rafael Serrano |

| 12 March 2017 24 | Real Madrid | 76–75 | FC Barcelona Lassa | Madrid |
| 18:30 (CET) | Scoring by quarter: 23–23, 24–13, 15–21, 14–18 |
| | Pts: Llull 16; Rebs: Hunter 10; Asts: Llull 7 PIR: Hunter 17 | Boxscore | Pts: Perperoglou 16; Rebs: Tomić 8 Asts: Tomić 4 PIR: Tomić 26 | Arena: WiZink Center; Attendance: 12,448; Referees: J.A. Martín Bertrán, Carlos Cortés, Martín Caballero |

| 18 March 2017 25 | Rio Natura Monbus Obradoiro | 90–83 | Real Madrid | Santiago de Compostela |
| 19:00 (CET) | Scoring by quarter: 21–28, 16–10, 31–24, 22–21 |
| | Pts: Bendžius 21; Rebs: Whittington 7 Asts: McConnell 12; PIR: McConnell 29 | Boxscore | Pts: Llull, Dončić 17; Rebs: Ayón 5 Asts: Llull 5 PIR: Dončić, Ayón 15 | Arena: Multiusos Fontes do Sar; Attendance: 5,760; Referees: Carlos Peruga, Jordi Aliaga, M.A. Pérez Niz |

| 26 March 2017 26 | Real Madrid | 104–76 | RETAbet Bilbao Basket | Madrid |
| 12:30 (CET) | Scoring by quarter: 23-20, 23-19, 27-22, 31-15 |
| | Pts: Llull 29; Rebs: Ayón 7 Asts: Draper 5 PIR: Llull 32 | Boxscore | Pts: Buva 19; Rebs: Eric 8 Asts: Tabu 5 PIR: Eric 22 | Arena: WiZink Center; Attendance: 8,745; Referees: Antonio Conde, Oscar Perea, J.J. Martínez Díez |

| 1 April 2017 27 | Montakit Fuenlabrada | 99–101 | Real Madrid | Fuenlabrada |
| 18:30 (CET) | Scoring by quarter: 26-22, 30-28, 24-30, 19-21 |
| | Pts: Wear 22; Rebs: Three Players 5 Asts: Rupnik 10; PIR: Wear 24 | Boxscore | Pts: Llull 28; Rebs: Reyes 14; Asts: Llull 4 PIR: Reyes 40 | Arena: Fernando Martín; Attendance: 5,700; Referees: Jiménez Trujillo, Castillo, Pedro Munar |

| 9 April 2017 28 | Real Madrid | 86–82 | Baskonia | Madrid |
| 18:30 (CET) | Scoring by quarter: 16-18, 24-19, 25-22, 21-23 |
| | Pts: Dončić 15; Rebs: Dončić 13; Asts: Dončić, Llull 4 PIR: Dončić 32 | Boxscore | Pts: Beaubois 19; Rebs: Voigtmann 10; Asts: Larkin 5 PIR: Voigtmann 22 | Arena: WiZink Center; Attendance: 10,178; Referees: M.A. Pérez Pérez, J.R. García Ortiz, Juan de Dios Oyón |

| 16 April 2017 29 | Real Madrid | 87–76 | Real Betis Energía Plus | Madrid |
| | | | | Arena: WiZink Center |

| 23 April 2017 30 | ICL Manresa | vs. | Real Madrid | Manresa |
| | | | | Arena: Nou Congost |

| 30 April 2017 31 | Real Madrid | vs. | Movistar Estudiantes | Madrid |
| | | | | Arena: WiZink Center |

| 6 May 2017 32 | Tecnyconta Zaragoza | vs. | Real Madrid | Zaragoza |
| | | | | Arena: Príncipe Felipe |

| 11 May 2017 33 | Real Madrid | vs. | Divina Seguros Joventut | Madrid |
| | | | | Arena: WiZink Center |

| 14 May 2017 34 | MoraBanc Andorra | vs. | Real Madrid | Andorra la Vella |
| | | | | Arena: Poliesportiu d'Andorra |

==== Results overview ====
Win Draw Loss

| Opposition | Home score | Away score | Double |
|---|---|---|---|
| Baskonia | 86–82 | 77–62 | 148-159 |
| Divina Seguros Joventut | | 78–81 | |
| FC Barcelona Lassa | 76–75 | 85–75 | 151–160 |
| Herbalife Gran Canaria | 81-93 | 68–76 | 169–162 |
| Iberostar Tenerife | 86–59 | 81–93 | 167-152 |
| ICL Manresa | 96–70 | | |
| Montakit Fuenlabrada | 92–76 | 91-101 | 193-167 |
| MoraBanc Andorra | 96–92 | | |
| Movistar Estudiantes | | 88–96 | |
| Real Betis Energía Plus | | 86–85 | |
| RETAbet Bilbao Basket | 104–76 | 77–85 | 189-153 |
| Rio Natura Monbus Obradoiro | 106–59 | 90-83 | 189–149 |
| Tecnyconta Zaragoza | 94–68 | | |
| UCAM Murcia | 93–86 | 61–89 | 182–147 |
| Unicaja | 101–90 | 82–78 | 179–172 |
| Valencia Basket | 85–71 | 75–94 | 179–146 |

=== EuroLeague ===
==== League table ====
| Pos | Team | Pld | W | L | PF | PA | PD | Qualification |
|---|---|---|---|---|---|---|---|---|
| 1 | (Spain) Real Madrid | 30 | 23 | 7 | 2585 | 2353 | +232 | Advance to Playoffs |
| 2 | (Russia) CSKA Moscow | 30 | 22 | 8 | 2608 | 2355 | +253 | Advance to Playoffs |
| 3 | (Greece) Olympiacos | 30 | 19 | 11 | 2330 | 2221 | +109 | Advance to Playoffs |
| 4 | (Greece) Panathinaikos Superfoods | 30 | 19 | 11 | 2263 | 2187 | +76 | Advance to Playoffs |
| 5 | (Turkey) Fenerbahçe | 30 | 18 | 12 | 2256 | 2233 | +23 | Advance to Playoffs |

Source: EuroLeague
Rules for classification: All points scored in extra period(s) will not be counted in the standings, nor for any tie-break situation.

==== Results summary ====
| Overall | | | | | | Home | | | | | Away | | | | |
| Pld | W | L | PF | PA | PD | W | L | PF | PA | PD | W | L | PF | PA | PD |
|---|---|---|---|---|---|---|---|---|---|---|---|---|---|---|---|
| 30 | 23 | 7 | 2585 | 2353 | +232 | 14 | 1 | 1338 | 1174 | +164 | 9 | 6 | 1247 | 1179 | +68 |

Last updated: April 8, 2017.
Source: Competitive matches

==== Results by round ====
| Round | 1 | 2 | 3 | 4 | 5 | 6 | 7 | 8 | 9 | 10 | 11 | 12 | 13 | 14 | 15 | 16 | 17 | 18 | 19 | 20 | 21 | 22 | 23 | 24 | 25 | 26 | 27 | 28 | 29 | 30 |
|---|---|---|---|---|---|---|---|---|---|---|---|---|---|---|---|---|---|---|---|---|---|---|---|---|---|---|---|---|---|---|
| Ground | H | A | H | A | H | A | H | A | H | A | H | A | H | A | A | H | H | A | A | H | A | A | H | A | H | A | H | A | H | H |
| Result | W | W | L | W | W | L | W | W | W | L | W | L | W | L | W | W | W | W | W | W | W | W | W | L | W | L | W | W | W | W |
| Position | 2 | 2 | 3 | 3 | 2 | 2 | 2 | 2 | 2 | 2 | 2 | 2 | 2 | 2 | 2 | 2 | 2 | 2 | 1 | 1 | 1 | 1 | 1 | 1 | 1 | 1 | 1 | 1 | 1 | 1 |

Last updated: April 8, 2017.
Source: Competitive matches
Ground: A = Away; H = Home; R = Rest. Result: L = Loss; W = Win; R = Rest; P = Postponed.

==== Matches ====
Win Loss

| 12 October 2016 1 | Real Madrid (Spain) | 83–65 | (Greece) Olympiacos | Madrid |
| 21:00 (CEST) | Scoring by quarter: 24–17, 18–23, 20–13, 21–12 |
| | Pts: Llull 22; Rebs: Fernández 7 Asts: Fernández, Llull 4 PIR: Llull 20 | Boxscore | Pts: Lojeski 14; Rebs: Birch 10; Asts: Spanoulis 5 PIR: Spanoulis 14 | Arena: Barclaycard Center; Attendance: 11,723; Referees: Luigi Lamonica (ITA), Robert Lottermosser (GER), Oļegs Latiševs (LAT) |

| 20 October 2016 2 | Maccabi FOX Tel Aviv (Israel) | 82–89 | (Spain) Real Madrid | Tel Aviv |
| 20:05 (CEST) | Scoring by quarter: 16–20, 17–26, 24–16, 25–27 |
| | Pts: Rudd 18; Rebs: Rudd 7 Asts: Goudelock, Weems 5 PIR: Goudelock 22 | Boxscore | Pts: Carroll 18; Rebs: Ayón 8 Asts: Llull 11; PIR: Ayón 16 | Arena: Menora Mivtachim Arena; Attendance: 10,728; Referees: Borys Rhyzhyk (UKR), Milivoje Jovčić (SRB), Spiros Gkontas (GRE) |

| 25 October 2016 3 | Real Madrid (Spain) | 87–91 | (Spain) Baskonia | Madrid |
| 21:00 (CEST) | Scoring by quarter: 19–32, 24–22, 23–15, 21–22 |
| | Pts: Ayón 16; Rebs: Randolph 13; Asts: Dončić, Fernández 4 PIR: Dončić 24 | Boxscore | Pts: Blažič 21; Rebs: Voigtmann 11; Asts: Larkin 5 PIR: Voigtmann 26 | Arena: Barclaycard Center; Attendance: 10,098; Referees: Damir Javor (SLO), Emin Moğulkoç (TUR), Tomislav Hordov (CRO) |

| 27 October 2016 4 | EA7 Emporio Armani Milan (Italy) | 90–101 | (Spain) Real Madrid | Assago |
| 20:00 (CEST) | Scoring by quarter: 20–26, 21–26, 25–23, 24–26 |
| | Pts: Hickman 19; Rebs: Sanders 6 Asts: Simon 6 PIR: Hickman 24 | Boxscore | Pts: Randolph 20; Rebs: Randolph 14; Asts: Llull 6 PIR: Randolph 26 | Arena: Mediolanum Forum; Attendance: 12,518; Referees: Elias Koromilas (GRE), Matej Boltauzer (SLO), Petri Mäntylä (FIN) |

| 3 November 2016 5 | Real Madrid (Spain) | 90–81 | (Turkey) Galatasaray Odeabank | Madrid |
| 20:00 (CET) | Scoring by quarter: 19–22, 26–25, 21–17, 24–17 |
| | Pts: Llull 23; Rebs: Randolph 10; Asts: Fernández 6 PIR: Llull 23 | Boxscore | Pts: Micov 17; Rebs: Tyus 8 Asts: Güler 5 PIR: Tyus 16 | Arena: Barclaycard Center; Attendance: 8,914 (tentative); Referees: Saša Pukl (SLO), Ilija Belošević (SRB), Jurgis Laurinavičius (LTU) |

| 11 November 2016 6 | CSKA Moscow (Russia) | 91–90 | (Spain) Real Madrid | Moscow |
| 18:30 (CET) | Scoring by quarter: 17–26, 32–12, 24–30, 18–22 |
| | Pts: De Colo 28; Rebs: Kurbanov 8 Asts: Teodosić 6 PIR: De Colo 35 | Boxscore | Pts: Llull 21; Rebs: Dončić 8 Asts: Llull 7 PIR: Llull 21 | Arena: Megasport Arena; Attendance: 12,017; Referees: Robert Lottermoser (GER), Oļegs Latiševs (LAT), Piotr Pastusiak (POL) |

| 16 November 2016 7 | Real Madrid (Spain) | 87–84 | (Greece) Panathinaikos Superfoods | Madrid |
| 21:00 (CET) | Scoring by quarter: 21–23, 32–27, 19–18, 15–16 |
| | Pts: Llull 30; Rebs: Ayón 6 Asts: Ayón 5 PIR: Llull 27 | Boxscore | Pts: Feldeine 19; Rebs: Bourousis 9 Asts: N. Calathes 9 PIR: N. Calathes 24 | Arena: Barclaycard Center; Attendance: 10,489; Referees: Sreten Radović (CRO), Milivoje Jovčić (SRB), Jakub Zamojski (POL) |

| 18 November 2016 8 | FC Barcelona Lassa (Spain) | 63–102 | (Spain) Real Madrid | Barcelona |
| 21:00 (CET) | Scoring by quarter: 17–29, 14–25, 15–21, 17–27 |
| | Pts: Rice 23; Rebs: Vezenkov 10; Asts: Rice 5 PIR: Rice 23 | Boxscore | Pts: Llull 20; Rebs: Randolph 11; Asts: Llull 7 PIR: Randolph 25 | Arena: Palau Blaugrana; Attendance: 7,013; Referees: Borys Rhyzhyk (UKR), Carmelo Paternico (ITA), Matej Boltauzer (SLO) |

| 24 November 2016 9 | Real Madrid (Spain) | 89–75 | (Russia) UNICS | Madrid |
| 21:00 (CET) | Scoring by quarter: 25–17, 15–20, 22–18, 27–20 |
| | Pts: Reyes 16; Rebs: Fernández 7 Asts: Llull 7 PIR: Reyes 24 | Boxscore | Pts: Parakhouski 19; Rebs: Langford, Parakhouski 7 Asts: Langford 5 PIR: Parakhouski 21 | Arena: Barclaycard Center; Attendance: 8,620; Referees: Christos Christodoulou (GRE), Emin Moğulkoç (TUR), Uroš Obrknežević (SRB) |

| 1 December 2016 10 | Fenerbahçe (Turkey) | 78–77 | (Spain) Real Madrid | Istanbul |
| 18:45 (CET) | Scoring by quarter: 23–19, 16–21, 18–17, 21–20 |
| | Pts: Nunnally 18; Rebs: Udoh 10; Asts: Sloukas, Dixon 6 PIR: Udoh, Nunnally 22 | Boxscore | Pts: Randolph 16; Rebs: Hunter 7 Asts: Fernández 9 PIR: Randolph 18 | Arena: Fenerbahçe Ülker Sports Arena; Attendance: 12,576; Referees: Sreten Radović (CRO), Robert Lottermoser (GER), Piotr Pastusiak (POL) |

| 8 December 2016 11 | Real Madrid (Spain) | 96–91 | (Lithuania) Žalgiris | Madrid |
| 21:00 (CET) | Scoring by quarter: 25–22, 24–27, 25–20, 22–22 |
| | Pts: Dončić 17; Rebs: Ayón 7 Asts: Fernández 7 PIR: Dončić 24 | Boxscore | Pts: Pangos 19; Rebs: Ulanovas, Westermann 6 Asts: Pangos, Westermann 4 PIR: Ulanovas 19 | Arena: Barclaycard Center; Attendance: 10,436; Referees: Luigi Lamonica (ITA), Oļegs Latiševs (LAT), Clemens Fritz (GER) |

| 15 December 2016 12 | Darüşşafaka Doğuş (Turkey) | 81–68 | (Spain) Real Madrid | Istanbul |
| 18:00 (CET) | Scoring by quarter: 17–20, 18–11, 17–13, 29–24 |
| | Pts: Wanamaker 27; Rebs: Erden 7 Asts: Wilbekin 3 PIR: Wanamaker 31 | Boxscore | Pts: Reyes 16; Rebs: Ayón 9 Asts: Draper, Dončić 6 PIR: Reyes, Hunter 18 | Arena: Volkswagen Arena; Attendance: 4,933; Referees: Fernando Rocha (POR), Elias Koromilas (GRE), Tomislav Hordov (CRO) |

| 20 December 2016 13 | Real Madrid (Spain) | 95–72 | (Germany) Brose Bamberg | Madrid |
| 20:45 (CET) | Scoring by quarter: 24–9, 23–16, 25–15, 23–32 |
| | Pts: Dončić 16; Rebs: three players 7 Asts: Llull 6 PIR: Dončić 25 | Boxscore | Pts: Staiger 18; Rebs: Theis 5 Asts: three players 3 PIR: Staiger 21 | Arena: Barclaycard Center; Attendance: 8,210; Referees: Christos Christodoulou (GRE), Borys Rhyzhyk (UKR), Miloš Koljenšić (MNE) |

| 22 December 2016 14 | Crvena zvezda mts (Serbia) | 82–70 | (Spain) Real Madrid | Belgrade |
| 19:00 (CET) | Scoring by quarter: 20–19, 23–16, 19–16, 20–19 |
| | Pts: Simonović 20; Rebs: Kuzmić 8 Asts: Jović 6 PIR: Simonović 22 | Boxscore | Pts: Taylor 25; Rebs: Randolph, Ayón 5 Asts: Ayón 7 PIR: Taylor 27 | Arena: Aleksandar Nikolić; Attendance: 6,498; Referees: Ioannis Foufis (GRE), Petri Mäntylä (FIN), Marcin Kowalski (POL) |

| 29 December 2016 15 | Anadolu Efes (Turkey) | 78–80 | (Spain) Real Madrid | Istanbul |
| 18:00 (CET) | Scoring by quarter: 22–21, 14–16, 27–24, 15–19 |
| | Pts: Paul 16; Rebs: Honeycutt 10; Asts: Heurtel 6 PIR: Dunston 17 | Boxscore | Pts: Dončić 17; Rebs: Hunter 8 Asts: Dončić 9 PIR: Dončić 31 | Arena: Abdi İpekçi Arena; Attendance: 4,722; Referees: Damir Javor (SLO), Oļegs Latiševs (LAT), Robert Vyklický (CZE) |

| 6 January 2017 16 | Real Madrid (Spain) | 95–85 | (Russia) CSKA Moscow | Madrid |
| 21:00 (CET) | Scoring by quarter: 23–24, 27–22, 24–24, 21–15 |
| | Pts: Llull 24; Rebs: Randolph 9 Asts: Llull 6 PIR: Ayón, Llull 24 | Boxscore | Pts: de Colo 18; Rebs: Augustine 5 Asts: Teodosić 5 PIR: Khryapa 15 | Arena: WiZink Center; Attendance: 11,998; Referees: Sreten Radović (CRO), Milivoje Jovčić (SRB), Piotr Pastusiak (POL) |

| 13 January 2017 17 | Real Madrid (Spain) | 80–75 | (Israel) Maccabi FOX Tel Aviv | Madrid |
| 21:00 (CET) | Scoring by quarter: 16–21, 21–15, 16–20, 27–19 |
| | Pts: Fernández, Ayón 14; Rebs: Dončić 11; Asts: Dončić 8 PIR: Dončić 32 | Boxscore | Pts: Goudelock, Rudd 18; Rebs: Iverson 10; Asts: Smith 3 PIR: Rudd 25 | Arena: WiZink Center; Attendance: 11,079; Referees: Saša Pukl (SLO), Carmelo Paternico (ITA), Marko Juras (SRB) |

| 20 January 2017 18 | Žalgiris (Lithuania) | 59–74 | (Spain) Real Madrid | Kaunas |
| 18:00 (CET) | Scoring by quarter: 17–17, 16–24, 20–12, 6–21 |
| | Pts: Lima 13; Rebs: Jankūnas 7 Asts: Westermann 7 PIR: Lima 17 | Boxscore | Pts: Hunter 14; Rebs: Hunter 6 Asts: Llull 8 PIR: Ayón 22 | Arena: Žalgirio Arena; Attendance: 12,896; Referees: Damir Javor (SLO), Oļegs Latiševs (LAT), Emin Moğulkoç (TUR) |

| 25 January 2017 19 | Brose Bamberg (Germany) | 89–91 | (Spain) Real Madrid | Nuremberg |
| 20:00 (CET) | Scoring by quarter: 21–25, 26–26, 22–19, 20–21 |
| | Pts: Causeur 14; Rebs: Melli 6 Asts: Strēlnieks 8 PIR: Strēlnieks 18 | Boxscore | Pts: Llull 26; Rebs: Ayón 8 Asts: three players 4 PIR: Ayón 28 | Arena: Arena Nürnberger Versicherung; Attendance: 8,000; Referees: Ilija Belošević (SRB), Piotr Pastusiak (POL), Miloš Koljenšić (MNE) |

| 27 January 2017 20 | Real Madrid (Spain) | 94–89 | (Italy) EA7 Emporio Armani Milan | Madrid |
| 21:00 (CET) | Scoring by quarter: 22–18, 24–31, 23–24, 25–16 |
| | Pts: Llull 20; Rebs: Randolph, Ayón 8 Asts: Llull 9 PIR: Dončić 23 | Boxscore | Pts: Simon 20; Rebs: Mačvan 7 Asts: Kalnietis 4 PIR: Simon 21 | Arena: WiZink Center; Attendance: 10,358; Referees: Borys Ryzhyk (UKR), Elias Koromilas (GRE), Aare Halliko (EST) |

| 3 February 2017 21 | Baskonia (Spain) | 71–79 | (Spain) Real Madrid | Vitoria-Gasteiz |
| 20:30 (CET) | Scoring by quarter: 15–16, 21–23, 16–20, 19–20 |
| | Pts: Beaubois 20; Rebs: Voigtmann 13; Asts: Voigtmann 5 PIR: Voigtmann 21 | Boxscore | Pts: Dončić, Taylor 16; Rebs: Dončić 9 Asts: Llull 8 PIR: Dončić 30 | Arena: Fernando Buesa Arena; Attendance: 13,735; Referees: Sreten Radović (CRO), Matej Boltauzer (SLO), Ioannis Foufis (GRE) |

| 9 February 2017 22 | UNICS (Russia) | 77–81 | (Spain) Real Madrid | Kazan |
| 17:00 (CET) | Scoring by quarter: 18–17, 18–26, 23–14, 18–24 |
| | Pts: Langford 20; Rebs: Williams 6 Asts: Colom 9 PIR: Langford 25 | Boxscore | Pts: Randolph 19; Rebs: Dončić 7 Asts: Dončić 11; PIR: Randolph 25 | Arena: Basket Hall Kazan; Attendance: 4,731; Referees: Christos Christodoulou (GRE), Milivoje Jovčić (SRB), Tomislav Hordov (CRO) |

| 24 February 2017 23 | Real Madrid (Spain) | 101–83 | (Turkey) Darüşşafaka Doğuş | Madrid |
| 21:00 (CET) | Scoring by quarter: 30–14, 23–23, 22–23, 26–23 |
| | Pts: Llull 26; Rebs: Fernández 6 Asts: Llull 8 PIR: Llull 31 | Boxscore | Pts: Anderson 18; Rebs: Žižić 10; Asts: Bertāns 6 PIR: Anderson, Žižić 18 | Arena: WiZink Center; Attendance: 10,751; Referees: Borys Ryzhyk (UKR), Damir Javor (SLO), Miloš Koljenšić (MNE) |

| 2 March 2017 24 | Galatasaray Odeabank (Turkey) | 87–84 | (Spain) Real Madrid | Istanbul |
| 18:45 (CET) | Scoring by quarter: 25–20, 24–26, 24–14, 14–24 |
| | Pts: Daye 20; Rebs: Pleiß 1 Asts: Güler 9 PIR: Pleiß 21 | Boxscore | Pts: Randolph 16; Rebs: Dončić 8 Asts: Dončić 8 PIR: Dončić 26 | Arena: Abdi İpekçi Arena; Attendance: 3,909; Referees: Luigi Lamonica (ITA), Petros Papapetrou (GRE), Marko Juras (SRB) |

| 10 March 2017 25 | Real Madrid (Spain) | 98–68 | (Serbia) Crvena zvezda mts | Madrid |
| 21:00 (CET) | Scoring by quarter: 38–24, 25–20, 17–13, 18–11 |
| | Pts: Ayón, Mačiulis 12; Rebs: Hunter 8 Asts: Llull 10; PIR: Ayón 25 | Boxscore | Pts: Simonović 13; Rebs: Bjelica 8 Asts: Jenkins 6 PIR: Simonović 16 | Arena: WiZink Center; Attendance: 10,247; Referees: Robert Lottermoser (GER), Srios Gkontas (GRE), Marcin Kowalski (POL) |

| 16 March 2017 26 | Panathinaikos Superfoods (Greece) | 88–82 | (Spain) Real Madrid | Athens |
| 20:15 (CET) | Scoring by quarter: 21–19, 22–22, 15–17, 30–24 |
| | Pts: Singleton 21; Rebs: Singleton 9 Asts: Calathes 5 PIR: Singleton 23 | Boxscore | Pts: Randolph 13; Rebs: Randolph 9 Asts: Llull 8 PIR: Hunter 16 | Arena: Olympic Sports Center Athens; Attendance: 16,800; Referees: Ilija Belosevic (SRB), Matej Boltauzer (SLO), Amit Balak (ISR) |

| 22 March 2017 27 | Real Madrid (Spain) | 85–69 | (Spain) FC Barcelona Lassa | Madrid |
| 21:00 (CET) | Scoring by quarter: 22–13, 19–14, 23–24, 21–18 |
| | Pts: Llull 21; Rebs: Dončić 6 Asts: Llull 6 PIR: Llull 32 | Boxscore | Pts: Tyrese Rice, Tomić 12; Rebs: Tomić 10; Asts: Tyrese Rice 4 PIR: Tomić 16 | Arena: WiZink Center; Attendance: 11,759; Referees: Luigi Lamonica (ITA), Emin Mogulkoc (TUR), Milos Koljensic (MNE) |

| 24 March 2017 28 | Olympiacos (Greece) | 73–79 | (Spain) Real Madrid | Piraeus |
| 20:00 (CET) | Scoring by quarter: 20–19, 17–18, 17–21, 19–21 |
| | Pts: Milutinov 18; Rebs: Papanikolaou 6 Asts: Spanoulis 3 PIR: Milutinov 24 | Boxscore | Pts: Randolph, Llull 21; Rebs: Randolph 5 Asts: Llull 5 PIR: Randolph 30 | Arena: Peace and Friendship Stadium; Attendance: 11,039; Referees: Sreten Randovic (CRO), Fernando Rocha (POR), David Romano (ISR) |

| 31 March 2017 29 | Real Madrid (Spain) | 61–56 | (Turkey) Fenerbahçe | Madrid |
| 21:00 (CEST) | Scoring by quarter: 20–16, 9–16, 19–11, 13–13 |
| | Pts: Llull 16; Rebs: Ayón 8 Asts: Ayón 3 PIR: Ayón, Llull 11 | Boxscore | Pts: Bogdanović 15; Rebs: Veselý 8 Asts: Dixon 4 PIR: Veselý 18 | Arena: WiZink Center; Attendance: 10,827; Referees: Christos Christodoulou (GRE), Sasa Pukl (SLO), Amit Balak (ISR) |

| 7 April 2017 30 | Real Madrid (Spain) | 97–80 | (Turkey) Anadolu Efes | Madrid |
| 21:00 (CEST) | Scoring by quarter: 16-21, 21-15, 25-24, 35-20 |
| | Pts: Carroll 29; Rebs: Ayón, Hunter 7 Asts: Dončić 11; PIR: Carroll 29 | Boxscore | Pts: Dunston 15; Rebs: Brown 8 Asts: Honeycutt 2 PIR: Dunston 15 | Arena: WiZink Center; Attendance: 8,894; Referees: Robert Lottemoser (GER), Milivoje Jovcic (SRB), Peteri Mantyla (FIN) LOTTERMOSER, ROBERT (GER), JOVCIC, MILIVOJE (SRB), MANTYLA, PETRI (FIN) |

==== Results overview ====
Win Draw Loss

| Opposition | Home score | Away score | Double |
|---|---|---|---|
| (Turkey) Anadolu Efes | 97-80 | 78–80 | 177–158 |
| (Spain) Baskonia | 87–91 | 71–79 | 166–162 |
| (Germany) Brose Bamberg | 95–72 | 89–91 | 186–161 |
| (Serbia) Crvena zvezda mts | 98–68 | 82–70 | 168–160 |
| (Russia) CSKA Moscow | 95–85 | 91–90 | 185–176 |
| (Turkey) Darüşşafaka Doğuş | 101–83 | 81–68 | 169–164 |
| (Italy) EA7 Emporio Armani Milan | 94–89 | 90–101 | 195–179 |
| (Spain) FC Barcelona Lassa | 85–69 | 63–102 | 187–132 |
| (Turkey) Fenerbahçe | 61–56 | 78–77 | 138–134 |
| (Turkey) Galatasaray Odeabank | 90–81 | 87–84 | 174–168 |
| (Israel) Maccabi FOX Tel Aviv | 80–75 | 82–89 | 169–157 |
| (Greece) Olympiacos | 83–65 | 79–73 | 162–138 |
| (Greece) Panathinaikos Superfoods | 87–84 | 88–82 | 169–182 |
| (Russia) UNICS | 89–75 | 77–81 | 170–152 |
| (Lithuania) Žalgiris | 96–91 | 59–74 | 170–150 |

=== Euroleague Playoffs ===
==== Quarterfinals ====
Win Loss

| 19 April 2017 QF1 | Real Madrid (Spain) | vs. | (Turkey) Darüşşafaka Doğuş | Madrid |
| 21:00 (CEST) |
| | | [ Boxscore] | | Arena: WiZink Center |

| 21 April 2017 QF2 | Real Madrid (Spain) | vs. | (Turkey) Darüşşafaka Doğuş | Madrid |
| 21:00 (CEST) |
| | | [ Boxscore] | | Arena: WiZink Center |

| 26 April 2017 QF3 | Darüşşafaka Doğuş (Turkey) | vs. | (Spain) Real Madrid | Istanbul |
| 20:00 (CEST) |
| | | [ Boxscore] | | Arena: Volkswagen Arena |

=== Copa del Rey ===
Win Loss

| 16 February 2017 Quarterfinals | Real Madrid | 99–93(OT) | MoraBanc Andorra | Vitoria-Gasteiz |
| 21:30 (CET) | Scoring by quarter: 15–23, 18–20, 23–16, 30–27, Overtime: 13–7 |
| | Pts: Randolph 25; Rebs: Dončić 10; Asts: Llull 11; PIR: Llull 28 | Boxscore | Pts: Shermadini 27; Rebs: Albicy, Stević 8 Asts: Albicy 4 PIR: Shermadini 28 | Arena: Fernando Buesa Arena; Attendance: 14,597; Referees: Daniel Hierrezuelo, Carlos Peruga, Francisco José Araña |

| 18 February 2017 Semifinals | Baskonia | 99–103(OT) | Real Madrid | Vitoria-Gasteiz |
| 18:30 (CET) | Scoring by quarter: 20–15, 15–29, 29–24, 25–21, Overtime: 10–14 |
| | Pts: Beaubois 27; Rebs: Voigtmann 11; Asts: Larkin 9 PIR: Beaubois 25 | Boxscore | Pts: Dončić, Llull 23; Rebs: Dončić 6 Asts: Ayón 8 PIR: Dončić 26 | Arena: Fernando Buesa Arena; Attendance: 15,465; Referees: José Antonio Martín Bertrán, Miguel Ángel Pérez Pérez, Benjamín Jiménez |

| 19 February 2017 Final | Real Madrid | 97–95 | Valencia Basket | Vitoria-Gasteiz |
| 18:30 (CET) | Scoring by quarter: 22–16, 25–29, 27–26, 23–24 |
| | Pts: Llull 22; Rebs: Randolph 7 Asts: Dončić 6 PIR: Randolph 26 | Boxscore | Pts: Dubljević 28; Rebs: Oriola 8 Asts: Van Rossom 7 PIR: Dubljević 31 | Arena: Fernando Buesa Arena; Attendance: 14,982; Referees: Juan Carlos García González, Antonio Conde, Benjamín Jiménez |

== Statistics ==
Legend
| GP | Games played | GS | Games started | MPG | Minutes per game |
| FG% | Field-goal percentage | 3FG% | 3-point field-goal percentage | FT% | Free-throw percentage |
| RPG | Rebounds per game | APG | Assists per game | SPG | Steals per game |
| BPG | Blocks per game | PPG | Points per game | PIR | PIR per game |

=== Liga ACB ===
| Player | GP | GS | MPG | FG% | 3FG% | FT% | RPG | APG | SPG | BPG | PPG | PIR |
|---|---|---|---|---|---|---|---|---|---|---|---|---|
| Gustavo Ayón | 24 | 23 | 0.0 | .000 | .000 | .000 | 0.0 | 0.0 | 0.0 | 0.0 | 0.0 | 0.0 |
| Jaycee Carroll | 26 | 7 | 0.0 | .000 | .000 | .000 | 0.0 | 0.0 | 0.0 | 0.0 | 0.0 | 0.0 |
| Luka Dončić | 26 | 10 | 0.0 | .000 | .000 | .000 | 0.0 | 0.0 | 0.0 | 0.0 | 0.0 | 0.0 |
| Dontaye Draper | 21 | 0 | 0.0 | .000 | .000 | .000 | 0.0 | 0.0 | 0.0 | 0.0 | 0.0 | 0.0 |
| Rudy Fernández | 23 | 9 | 0.0 | .000 | .000 | .000 | 0.0 | 0.0 | 0.0 | 0.0 | 0.0 | 0.0 |
| Othello Hunter | 24 | 0 | 0.0 | .000 | .000 | .000 | 0.0 | 0.0 | 0.0 | 0.0 | 0.0 | 0.0 |
| Sergio Llull | 25 | 25 | 0.0 | .000 | .000 | .000 | 0.0 | 0.0 | 0.0 | 0.0 | 0.0 | 0.0 |
| Jonas Mačiulis | 21 | 20 | 0.0 | .000 | .000 | .000 | 0.0 | 0.0 | 0.0 | 0.0 | 0.0 | 0.0 |
| Andrés Nocioni | 20 | 0 | 0.0 | .000 | .000 | .000 | 0.0 | 0.0 | 0.0 | 0.0 | 0.0 | 0.0 |
| Anthony Randolph | 24 | 15 | 0.0 | .000 | .000 | .000 | 0.0 | 0.0 | 0.0 | 0.0 | 0.0 | 0.0 |
| Felipe Reyes | 26 | 14 | 0.0 | .000 | .000 | .000 | 0.0 | 0.0 | 0.0 | 0.0 | 0.0 | 0.0 |
| Álex Suárez | 8 | 0 | 0.0 | .000 | .000 | .000 | 0.0 | 0.0 | 0.0 | 0.0 | 0.0 | 0.0 |
| Jeffery Taylor | 23 | 7 | 0.0 | .000 | .000 | .000 | 0.0 | 0.0 | 0.0 | 0.0 | 0.0 | 0.0 |
| Trey Thompkins | 3 | 0 | 0.0 | .000 | .000 | .000 | 0.0 | 0.0 | 0.0 | 0.0 | 0.0 | 0.0 |

Last updated: July 9, 2016.
Source: ACB

=== EuroLeague ===
| Player | GP | GS | MPG | FG% | 3FG% | FT% | RPG | APG | SPG | BPG | PPG | PIR |
|---|---|---|---|---|---|---|---|---|---|---|---|---|
| Gustavo Ayón | 24 | 24 | 20:23 | 69.8% | - | 46.7% | 4.9 | 2.4 | 1.1 | 0.7 | 9.5 | 13.4 |
| Jaycee Carroll | 24 | 2 | 17:31 | .000 | .000 | .000 | 0.0 | 0.0 | 0.0 | 0.0 | 0.0 | 0.0 |
| Luka Dončić | 23 | 12 | 19:20 | .000 | .000 | .000 | 0.0 | 0.0 | 0.0 | 0.0 | 0.0 | 0.0 |
| Dontaye Draper | 21 | 2 | 14:16 | .000 | .000 | .000 | 0.0 | 0.0 | 0.0 | 0.0 | 0.0 | 0.0 |
| Rudy Fernández | 20 | 6 | 26:06 | .000 | .000 | .000 | 0.0 | 0.0 | 0.0 | 0.0 | 0.0 | 0.0 |
| Othello Hunter | 24 | 0 | 17:03 | .000 | .000 | .000 | 0.0 | 0.0 | 0.0 | 0.0 | 0.0 | 0.0 |
| Sergio Llull | 21 | 21 | 27:58 | .000 | .000 | .000 | 0.0 | 0.0 | 0.0 | 0.0 | 0.0 | 0.0 |
| Jonas Mačiulis | 20 | 18 | 16:55 | .000 | .000 | .000 | 0.0 | 0.0 | 0.0 | 0.0 | 0.0 | 0.0 |
| Andrés Nocioni | 13 | 0 | 6:18 | .000 | .000 | .000 | 0.0 | 0.0 | 0.0 | 0.0 | 0.0 | 0.0 |
| Anthony Randolph | 22 | 4 | 20:03 | .000 | .000 | .000 | 0.0 | 0.0 | 0.0 | 0.0 | 0.0 | 0.0 |
| Felipe Reyes | 22 | 17 | 14:40 | .000 | .000 | .000 | 0.0 | 0.0 | 0.0 | 0.0 | 0.0 | 0.0 |
| Álex Suárez | 0 | 0 | 0.0 | .000 | .000 | .000 | 0.0 | 0.0 | 0.0 | 0.0 | 0.0 | 0.0 |
| Jeffery Taylor | 18 | 11 | 14:25 | .000 | .000 | .000 | 0.0 | 0.0 | 0.0 | 0.0 | 0.0 | 0.0 |
| Trey Thompkins | 15 | 3 | 12:10 | .000 | .000 | .000 | 0.0 | 0.0 | 0.0 | 0.0 | 0.0 | 0.0 |

Last updated: July 9, 2016.
Source: EuroLeague

=== Copa del Rey ===
| Player | GP | GS | MPG | FG% | 3FG% | FT% | RPG | APG | SPG | BPG | PPG | PIR |
|---|---|---|---|---|---|---|---|---|---|---|---|---|
| Gustavo Ayón | 0 | 0 | 0.0 | .000 | .000 | .000 | 0.0 | 0.0 | 0.0 | 0.0 | 0.0 | 0.0 |
| Jaycee Carroll | 0 | 0 | 0.0 | .000 | .000 | .000 | 0.0 | 0.0 | 0.0 | 0.0 | 0.0 | 0.0 |
| Luka Dončić | 0 | 0 | 0.0 | .000 | .000 | .000 | 0.0 | 0.0 | 0.0 | 0.0 | 0.0 | 0.0 |
| Dontaye Draper | 0 | 0 | 0.0 | .000 | .000 | .000 | 0.0 | 0.0 | 0.0 | 0.0 | 0.0 | 0.0 |
| Rudy Fernández | 0 | 0 | 0.0 | .000 | .000 | .000 | 0.0 | 0.0 | 0.0 | 0.0 | 0.0 | 0.0 |
| Othello Hunter | 0 | 0 | 0.0 | .000 | .000 | .000 | 0.0 | 0.0 | 0.0 | 0.0 | 0.0 | 0.0 |
| Sergio Llull | 0 | 0 | 0.0 | .000 | .000 | .000 | 0.0 | 0.0 | 0.0 | 0.0 | 0.0 | 0.0 |
| Jonas Mačiulis | 0 | 0 | 0.0 | .000 | .000 | .000 | 0.0 | 0.0 | 0.0 | 0.0 | 0.0 | 0.0 |
| Andrés Nocioni | 0 | 0 | 0.0 | .000 | .000 | .000 | 0.0 | 0.0 | 0.0 | 0.0 | 0.0 | 0.0 |
| Anthony Randolph | 0 | 0 | 0.0 | .000 | .000 | .000 | 0.0 | 0.0 | 0.0 | 0.0 | 0.0 | 0.0 |
| Felipe Reyes | 0 | 0 | 0.0 | .000 | .000 | .000 | 0.0 | 0.0 | 0.0 | 0.0 | 0.0 | 0.0 |
| Álex Suárez | 0 | 0 | 0.0 | .000 | .000 | .000 | 0.0 | 0.0 | 0.0 | 0.0 | 0.0 | 0.0 |
| Jeffery Taylor | 0 | 0 | 0.0 | .000 | .000 | .000 | 0.0 | 0.0 | 0.0 | 0.0 | 0.0 | 0.0 |
| Trey Thompkins | 0 | 0 | 0.0 | .000 | .000 | .000 | 0.0 | 0.0 | 0.0 | 0.0 | 0.0 | 0.0 |

Last updated: July 9, 2016.
Source: ACB

=== Supercopa de España ===
| Player | GP | GS | MPG | FG% | 3FG% | FT% | RPG | APG | SPG | BPG | PPG | PIR |
|---|---|---|---|---|---|---|---|---|---|---|---|---|
| Gustavo Ayón | 1 | 1 | 19.0 | .667 | .000 | .000 | 0.0 | 0.0 | 0.0 | 1.0 | 4.0 | 0.0 |
| Jaycee Carroll | 1 | 0 | 19.0 | .300 | .200 | 1.000 | 5.0 | 1.0 | 0.0 | 0.0 | 10.0 | 8.0 |
| Luka Dončić | 1 | 0 | 24.0 | .286 | .000 | 1.000 | 8.0 | 1.0 | 1.0 | 1.0 | 8.0 | 18.0 |
| Dontaye Draper | 1 | 0 | 12.0 | .667 | .000 | 1.000 | 1.0 | 3.0 | 0.0 | 0.0 | 9.0 | 9.0 |
| Rudy Fernández | 1 | 1 | 25.0 | .385 | .000 | .000 | 2.0 | 5.0 | 0.0 | 0.0 | 15.0 | 11.0 |
| Othello Hunter | 1 | 0 | 18.0 | .429 | .000 | .500 | 7.0 | 2.0 | 1.0 | 0.0 | 7.0 | 10.0 |
| Sergio Llull | 1 | 1 | 28.0 | .556 | .667 | 1.000 | 1.0 | 2.0 | 1.0 | 0.0 | 27.0 | 22.0 |
| Jonas Mačiulis | 0 | 0 | 0.0 | .000 | .000 | .000 | 0.0 | 0.0 | 0.0 | 0.0 | 0.0 | 0.0 |
| Andrés Nocioni | 1 | 0 | 2.0 | .000 | .000 | .000 | 1.0 | 0.0 | 0.0 | 0.0 | 0.0 | 0.0 |
| Anthony Randolph | 1 | 1 | 22.0 | .400 | 1.000 | 1.000 | 5.0 | 2.0 | 1.0 | 0.0 | 7.0 | 9.0 |
| Felipe Reyes | 1 | 0 | 18.0 | .400 | .000 | .500 | 4.0 | 1.0 | 1.0 | 1.0 | 6.0 | 10.0 |
| Álex Suárez | 0 | 0 | 0.0 | .000 | .000 | .000 | 0.0 | 0.0 | 0.0 | 0.0 | 0.0 | 0.0 |
| Jeffery Taylor | 1 | 1 | 12.0 | .000 | .000 | .000 | 1.0 | 0.0 | 0.0 | 0.0 | 0.0 | 0.0 |
| Trey Thompkins | 0 | 0 | 0.0 | .000 | .000 | .000 | 0.0 | 0.0 | 0.0 | 0.0 | 0.0 | 0.0 |

Last updated: September 23, 2016.
Source: ACB
