= National Register of Historic Places listings in Monroe County, Georgia =

This is a list of properties and districts in Monroe County, Georgia that are listed on the National Register of Historic Places (NRHP).

This National Park Service list is complete through NPS recent listings posted January 2, 2026.

== Current listings ==
	Name on the Register	Image	Date listed	Location	City or town	Description
1	Culloden Historic District	Culloden Historic District	March 13, 1980 (#80001119)	Hickory Grove Rd., Main, College and Orange Sts. 32°51′51″N 84°05′48″W	Culloden	
2	Forsyth Commercial Historic District	Forsyth Commercial Historic District	January 13, 1983 (#83000239)	Main, Lee, Johnston, Adams, Jackson, Kimball, and Harris Sts. 33°02′04″N 83°56′20″W	Forsyth	
3	Forsyth Railroad Depots and Baggage Room	Forsyth Railroad Depots and Baggage Room	July 23, 2013 (#13000532)	E. Adams St. 33°02′07″N 83°56′03″W	Forsyth	
4	Front Circle, Tift College	Front Circle, Tift College	February 8, 1980 (#80001120)	Tift College Dr. 33°02′08″N 83°55′57″W	Forsyth	
5	Great Hill Place	Great Hill Place	July 24, 1973 (#73000633)	W of Bolingbroke off GA 41; 32°56′42″N 83°49′04″W	Bolingbroke	
6	Hil'ardin/Sharp-Hardin-Wright House		June 22, 1979 (#79000735)	212 S. Lee St. 33°01′40″N 83°56′19″W	Forsyth	
7	Monroe County Courthouse	Monroe County Courthouse	September 18, 1980 (#80001121)	Courthouse Sq. 33°02′03″N 83°56′20″W	Forsyth	
8	Montpelier Female Institute	Montpelier Female Institute	October 10, 1975 (#75000602)	W of Macon; 32°52′11″N 83°53′01″W	Macon	Historical marker at 32.865105°N 83.882016°W Down a private road, if it still exists
9	State Teachers and Agricultural College for Negroes Women's Dormitory and Teachers' Cottage	State Teachers and Agricultural College for Negroes Women's Dormitory and Teachers' Cottage	May 30, 2003 (#03000475)	Martin Luther King Dr. 33°01′25″N 83°57′16″W	Forsyth	Part of the former State Teachers and Agricultural College for Negroes (Georgia)
