= State Teachers and Agricultural College for Negroes Women's Dormitory and Teachers' Cottage =

Historic buildings in Forsyth, Georgia

- U.S. National Register of Historic Places
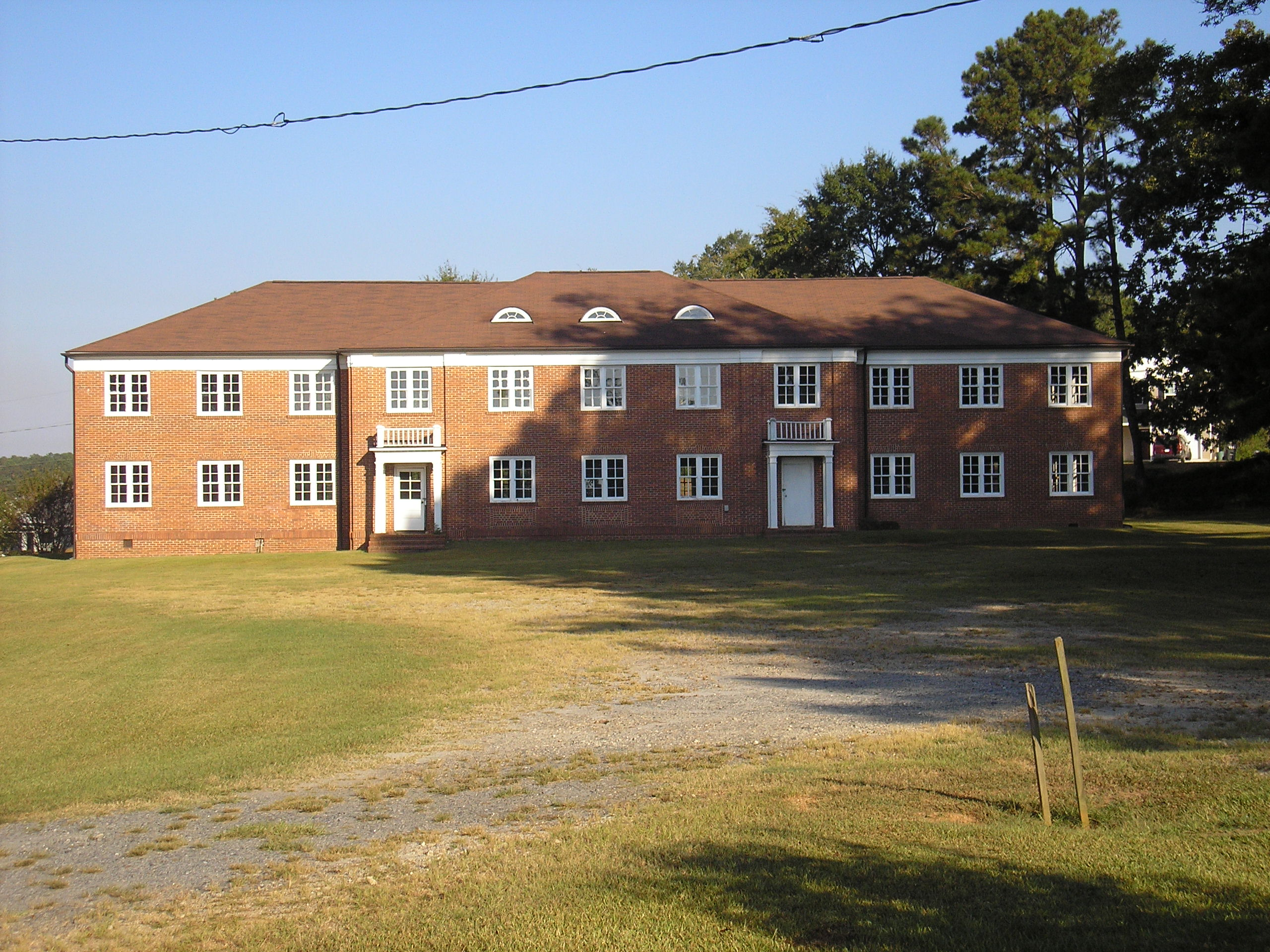
- Women's dormitory, c. 2013

- Location within Georgia
- Nearest city: Forsyth, Georgia, United States
- Coordinates: 33°01′24″N 83°57′16″W
- Area: 3 acres (1.2 ha)
- Built: c. 1929
- Architectural style: Colonial Revival, Craftsman bungalow
- NRHP reference No.: 03000475
- Added to NRHP: May 30, 2003

State Teachers and Agricultural College for Negroes Women's Dormitory and Teachers' Cottage are two historic buildings associated with the former State Teachers and Agricultural College for Negroes in Forsyth, Georgia. The site has been listed on the National Register of Historic Places since May 30, 2005; for architecture, educational history, and Black ethnic heritage. It was also known as the Hubbard Training School Dormitory, Hubbard School Dormitory, and the School of Agriculture and Mechanic Arts for the Training of Negroes Dormitory.

== History ==
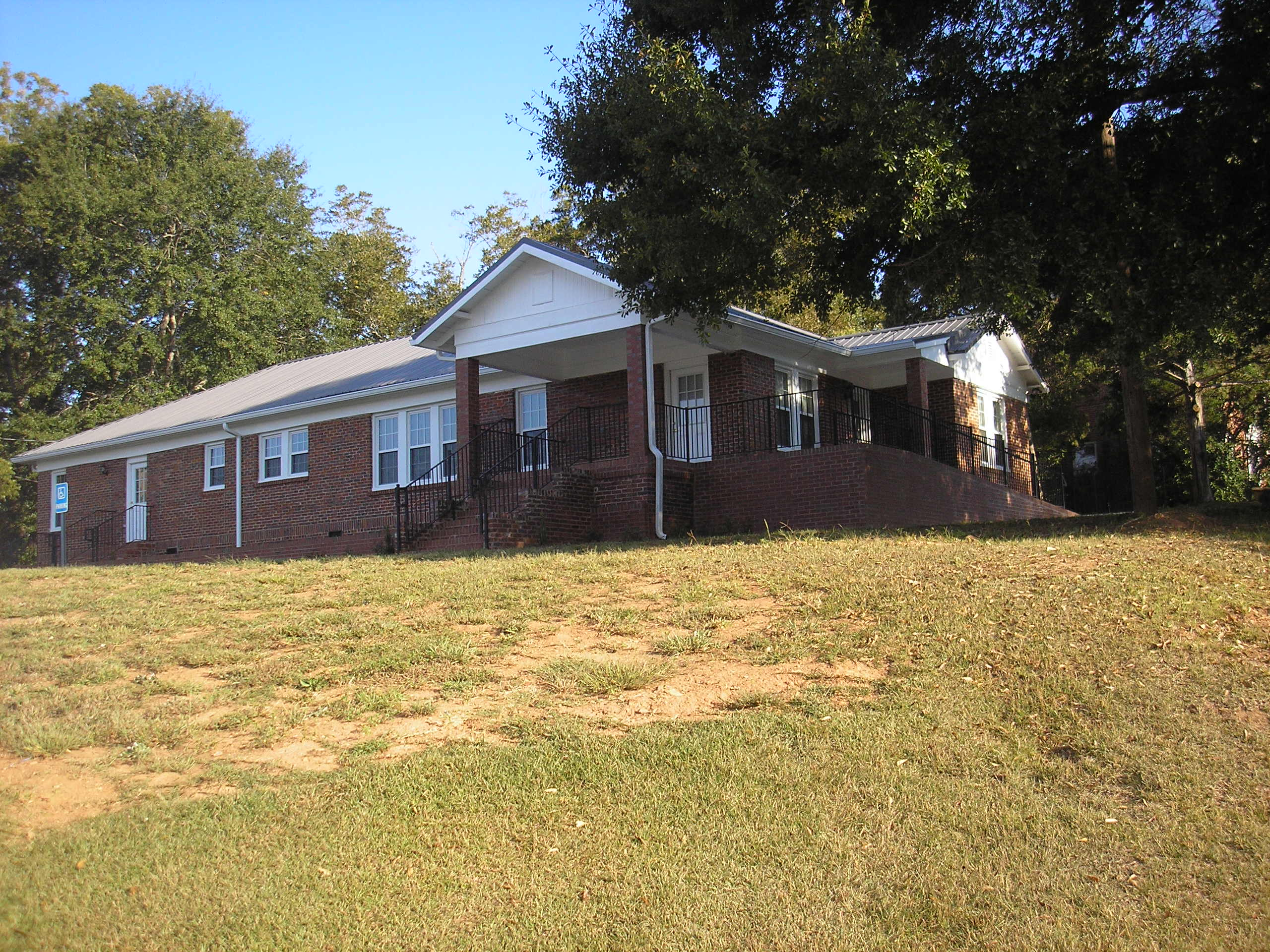
Teachers' cottage, c. 2013

Founded in 1902, as the Forsyth Normal and Industrial School, a private school for African American students in elementary and secondary school, and affiliated with the American Missionary Association. In 1931, the school name was changed to the State Teachers and Agricultural College for Negroes (STAC), and it became an official school for the State of Georgia for the instruction of African American teachers, active between 1931 and 1938. By 1932, it was one of three African American public colleges added to the University System of Georgia.

The State Teachers and Agricultural College for Negroes Women's Dormitory was built in 1936 in a Colonial Revival-style; and the Teachers' Cottage was built in 1929-–1930 in the Craftsman-style. These two buildings are the only two publicly owned African American educational buildings remaining in Georgia, as of 2003.

== See also ==
- National Register of Historic Places listings in Monroe County, Georgia
