= Chris Flanagan (broadcaster) =

American news anchor

- Born: Christopher Flanagan; December 18, 1970 (age 55); Connecticut
- Education: Colorado State University Southern Connecticut State University
- Occupation: News Anchor
- Years active: 1992-present
- Spouse: Kristin
- Children: 3

Christopher Flanagan is an American News Anchor currently working for WDVM-TV in the Washington, D.C., market. Before that, he was at FOX affiliate and former network- owned-and-operated station WFXT in Boston, Massachusetts.

== Education ==
Flanagan graduated from Daniel Hand High School in Madison, CT in 1989. He is a graduate of Southern Connecticut State University.

== Career ==
Starting his career as a weekend Sports Analyst from 1992 to 2004, Flanagan then took over the Main Anchor position at WOI-DT in Des Moines, Iowa, a position he held for four years while being nominated for several Emmys. He departed the station in order to take on an anchor position on the weekday morning show for WFAA in Dallas. Flanagan then left Dallas to take on his second Main Anchor position, this time for WEWS-TV in Cleveland, Ohio. In 2016, Flanagan joined the staff of WFXT in Boston as an Anchor/Reporter.

Flanagan joined WDVM-TV in Washington, DC as an evening anchor on July 11, 2022, which coincided with that station's news department relaunch as DC News Now.
