= Jack Driscoll (American football) =

American football player (born 1997)

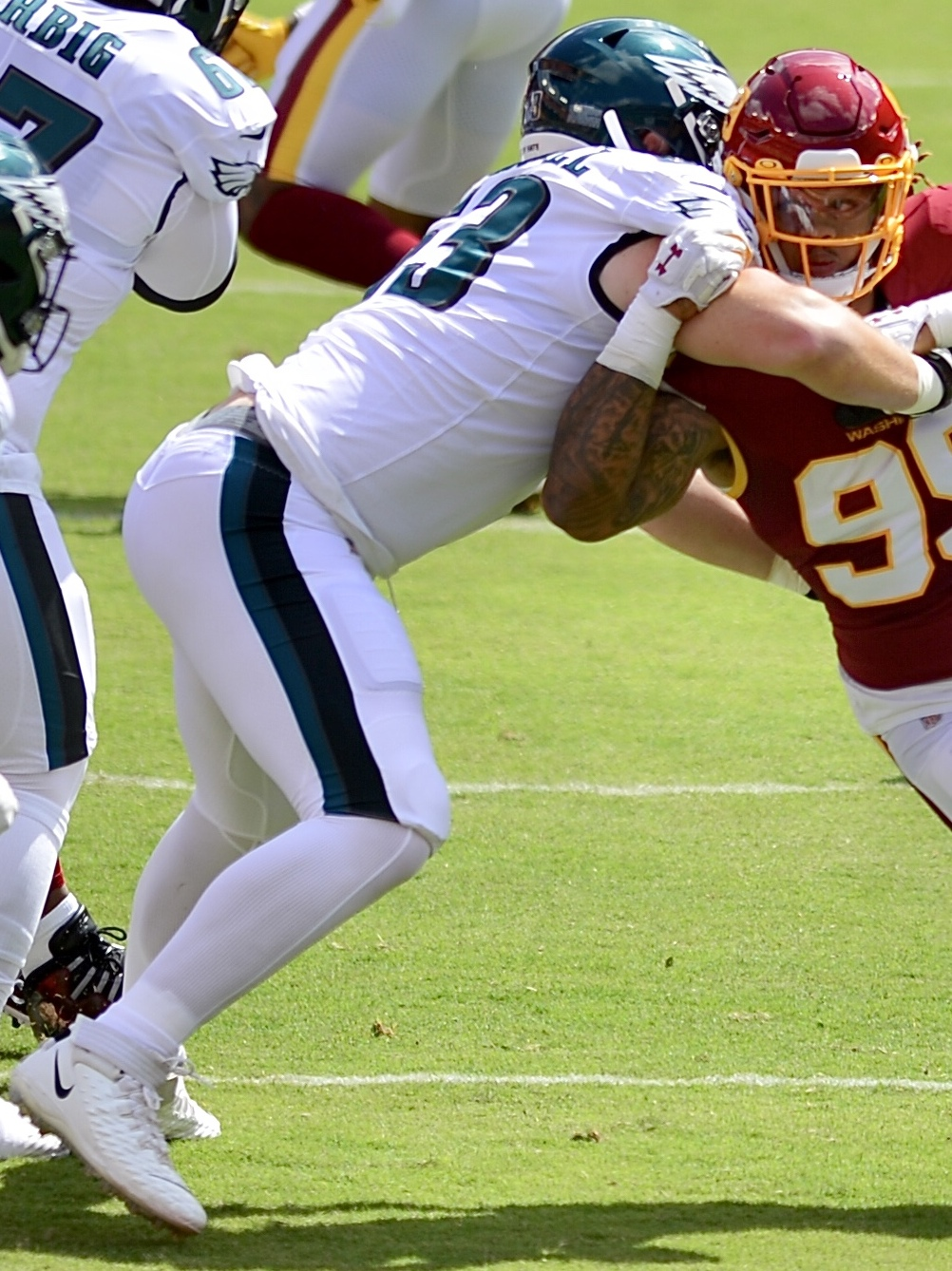
- Driscoll with the Philadelphia Eagles in 2020

No. 68 – Pittsburgh Steelers
- Position: Offensive tackle
- Roster status: Injured reserve/designated for return

Personal information
- Born: April 1, 1997 (age 29); Madison, Connecticut, U.S.
- Listed height: 6 ft 5 in (1.96 m)
- Listed weight: 312 lb (142 kg)

Career information
- High school: Daniel Hand (Madison)
- College: UMass (2015–2017); Auburn (2018–2019)
- NFL draft: 2020: 4th round, 145th overall pick

Career history
- Philadelphia Eagles (2020–2023); Miami Dolphins (2024)*; Philadelphia Eagles (2024); Pittsburgh Steelers (2025–present)
- * Offseason or practice squad member only

Awards and highlights
- Super Bowl champion (LIX)

Career NFL statistics as of 2025
- Games played: 67
- Games started: 18
- Stats at Pro Football Reference

Jack Driscoll (born April 1, 1997) is an American professional football offensive tackle for the Pittsburgh Steelers of the National Football League (NFL). He played college football for the UMass Minutemen and Auburn Tigers and was selected by the Philadelphia Eagles in the fourth round of the 2020 NFL draft.

== Early life ==
Driscoll was one of three children born in Madison, Connecticut to Cory and John Driscoll. His father played college football for the University of New Hampshire. Driscoll attended Daniel Hand High School where he played tackle, defensive end and offensive tackle positions for the Daniel Hand Tigers team. While in high school, Driscoll first worked at a Nike store. In his senior season, Driscoll was team captain and voted Most Valuable Player. Graduating in 2014, Driscoll was rated as a two-star recruit by 247Sports, with offers from Army and the University of Massachusetts.

== College career ==
A two-star recruit, Driscoll committed to UMass over an offer from Army. He played at UMass for three years before transferring to Auburn for his final two seasons as a graduate transfer. He won the starting job at right tackle and spent two years playing in that position in the Southeastern Conference. He played in the East-West All-Star Game.

Driscoll earned a bachelor’s degree in hospitality and tourism management from Massachusetts and a graduate degree from Auburn.

== Professional career ==
Pre-draft measurables
| Height | Weight | Arm length | Hand span | Wingspan | 40-yard dash | 10-yard split | 20-yard split | Vertical jump | Broad jump | Bench press |
|---|---|---|---|---|---|---|---|---|---|---|
| 6 ft 4 5/8 in (1.95 m) | 306 lb (139 kg) | 33 in (0.84 m) | 9 7/8 in (0.25 m) | 6 ft 6 1/2 in (1.99 m) | 5.02 s | 1.74 s | 2.87 s | 29.5 in (0.75 m) | 9 ft 6 in (2.90 m) | 23 reps |
All values from NFL Combine

=== Philadelphia Eagles (first stint) ===
Driscoll was selected by the Philadelphia Eagles in the fourth round (145th overall) of the 2020 NFL draft. During his professional debut against the Washington Football Team on September 13, 2020, Driscoll left the game with an undisclosed injury. He was placed on injured reserve on December 18 after suffering a knee injury in Week 14. He finished the season with four starts at right tackle.

On September 2, 2021, Driscoll was placed on injured reserve. He was activated on October 2, and placed back on injured reserve on November 30.

In his four years in Philadelphia, Driscoll was a primary backup tackle and guard with 17 starts in 54 games.

=== Miami Dolphins ===
On March 18, 2024, Driscoll signed with the Miami Dolphins. He was released by the Dolphins on August 28.

=== Philadelphia Eagles (second stint) ===
On September 4, 2024, Driscoll was signed to the Philadelphia Eagles practice squad. He was promoted to the active roster on October 23. He won a Super Bowl championship when the Eagles defeated the Kansas City Chiefs 40–22 in Super Bowl LIX.

=== Pittsburgh Steelers ===
On October 29, 2025, the Pittsburgh Steelers signed Driscoll to their practice squad. He was promoted to the active roster on December 31.

On March 11, 2026, Driscoll re-signed with the Steelers. He was placed on injured reserve due to an ankle injury on August 30.

== Personal life ==
Driscoll's father, John, played at New Hampshire and was a 12th-round selection by the Buffalo Bills in 1989. Driscoll has a brother named Flynn and a sister named Grace. Driscoll has stated he owns a large baseball card collection.
