= Daniel Hand High School =

Location
- 286 Green Hill Road; Madison, Connecticut 06443; United States; 41°17′36″N 72°37′12″W

Information
- Type: Public
- Motto: PRIDE - Perseverance, Respect, Integrity, Dedication, Enthusiasm
- Established: 1884 (142 years ago)
- School district: Madison Public Schools
- Superintendent: Craig Cooke
- CEEB code: 070370
- Principal: Anthony Salutari
- Teaching staff: 79.50 (FTE)
- Grades: 9-12
- Enrollment: 776 (2023-2024)
- Student to teacher ratio: 9.76
- Colors: Black and gold
- Fight song: On Wisconsin
- Athletics conference: Southern Connecticut Conference (SCC)
- Mascot: Tiger
- Rival: Guilford
- Feeder schools: Polson Middle School
- Website: www.madison.k12.ct.us/daniel-hand-high-school

Daniel Hand High School is a four-year comprehensive public high school in Madison, Connecticut, United States. It serves grades 9 through 12 and is the only high school in Madison Public Schools.

== History ==
Businessman Daniel Hand, a native of Madison, funded construction of a high school for the city in 1884 at the price of $15,000 and relinquished property ownership to the local government. Under the name of Hand Academy, it served the city until 1921, when the building was torn down and a schoolhouse for all grades was built. That school lasted forty years until Madison Public Schools constructed a purpose-built high school in 1961 and named it Daniel Hand High School.

== Athletics ==
Daniel Hand athletic team's mascot are the Tigers and compete in the Southern Connecticut Conference.

State Championships
Sport	Year(s)
Baseball	2021
Basketball (boys)	2022
Basketball (girls)	1999, 2017
Cross country (boys)	2007, 2008
Field hockey	2014, 2017, 2023
Football	1976, 1977, 1982, 1984, 1989, 1997, 2003, 2004, 2005, 2011, 2012, 2017, 2018, 2023, 2025
Golf (boys)	2012, 2013, 2019, 2021, 2023, 2026
Gymnastics	1978, 1979, 1980, 1981, 1985, 1993, 1997, 1998, 1999, 2000, 2003, 2006, 2007, 2013, 2014, 2015, 2016, 2017, 2022, 2023, 2024
Hockey (boys)	2006, 2014
Lacrosse (boys)	2024
Soccer (boys)	1993, 1995, 1997*, 2016, 2017, 2018, 2019
Softball	2001
Swimming and diving (girls)	2018
Tennis (boys)	1980, 1981, 2013*, 2014, 2018
Tennis (girls)	2011, 2012, 2017, 2019
Track and field (outdoor, boys)	2010, 2017, 2024, 2025, 2026
Track and field (outdoor, girls)	2010
Wrestling	1978, 1982, 1983, 1995, 2012

* denotes a co-championship

# denotes state open championship

== Performing arts ==
DHHS has a competitive mixed-gender show choir, "VIBE", and previously fielded the all-female "Aura". VIBE has won regional-level championships before, and is regarded as one of the most consistently successful choirs in New England. The program has also hosted an annual competition, the Connecticut Classic, which has drawn choirs from as far as Mississippi and California.

== Notable alumni ==
- Jack Driscoll, NFL player for the Philadelphia Eagles
- Chris Flanagan, broadcaster in the Washington, DC television market
- Joe Trapani, basketball player
- Streeter Seidell, head writer for Saturday Night Live and formerly CollegeHumor
- Madison Hamburg, director of the documentary Murder on Middle Beach
