= Forsyth Commercial Historic District =

Historic district in Georgia, United States

- U.S. National Register of Historic Places
- U.S. Historic district
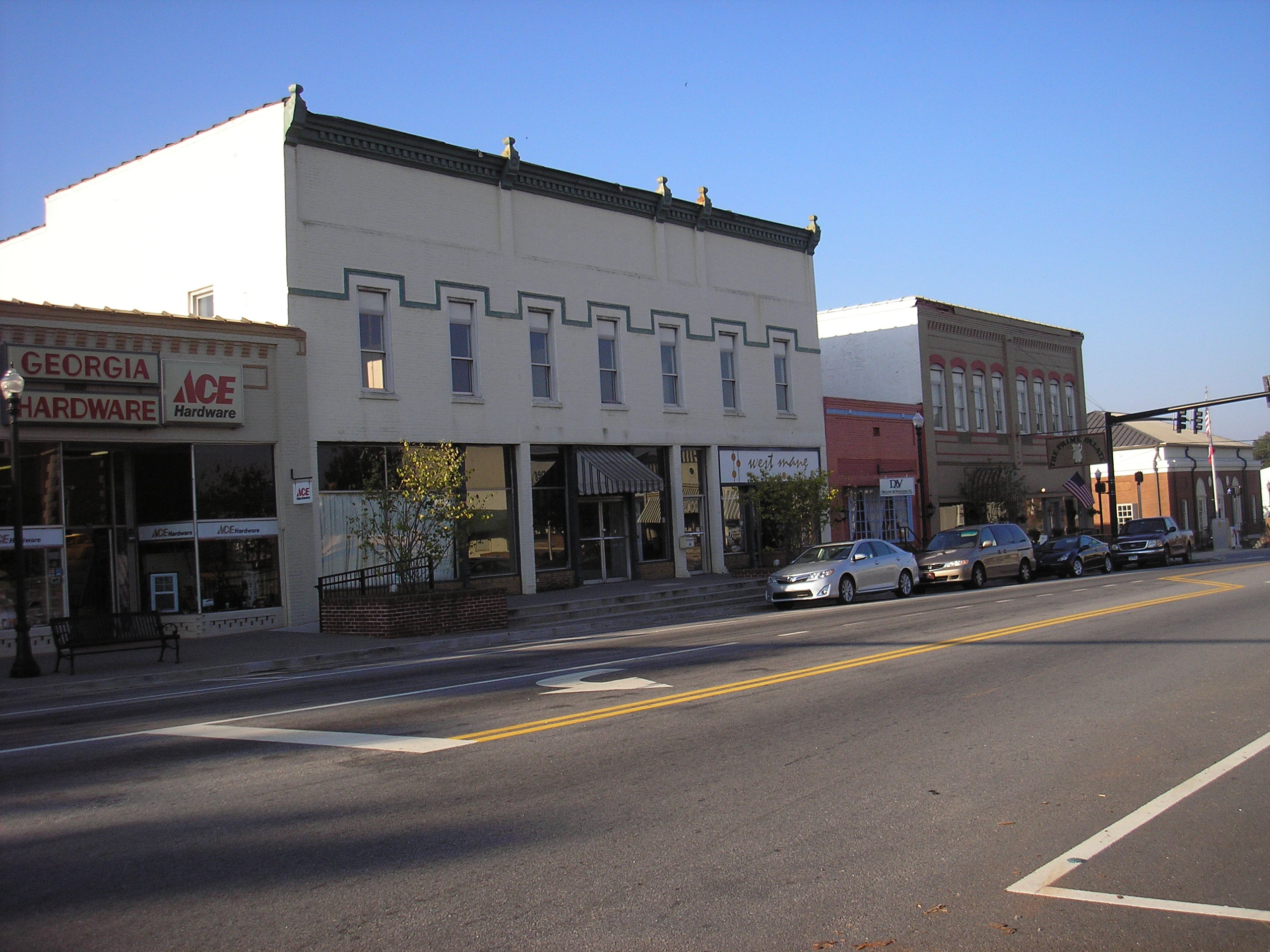

- Location within Georgia
- Location: Main, Lee, Johnston, Adams, Jackson, Kimball, and Harris Sts., Forsyth, Georgia
- Coordinates: 33°02′04″N 83°56′20″W
- Area: 15 acres (6.1 ha)
- Architect: Multiple
- Architectural style: Late 19th and 20th Century Revivals, Late Victorian
- NRHP reference No.: 83000239
- Added to NRHP: January 13, 1983

Forsyth Commercial Historic District in Forsyth, Georgia is a 15 acres (6.1 ha) historic district which was listed on the National Register of Historic Places in 1983. It is approximately the area of Main, Lee, Johnston, Adams, Jackson, Kimball, and Harris Streets, and it included 60 contributing buildings.

== Geography ==
The district was deemed significant in part "for its fine collection of 19th and early 20th century commercial buildings that represents the prevailing design principles and construction practices of commercial architecture during this period of time, especially as found in small piedmont Georgia cities. Significant local interpretations of prevailing national styles such as the Italianate, Romanesque, Renaissance Revival, Victorian Eclectic, Neoclassical, Commercial and Colonial Revival are well represented."

It includes the Monroe County Courthouse, which was already separately listed on the National Register.
