= Joe Trapani =

American-Italian basketball player

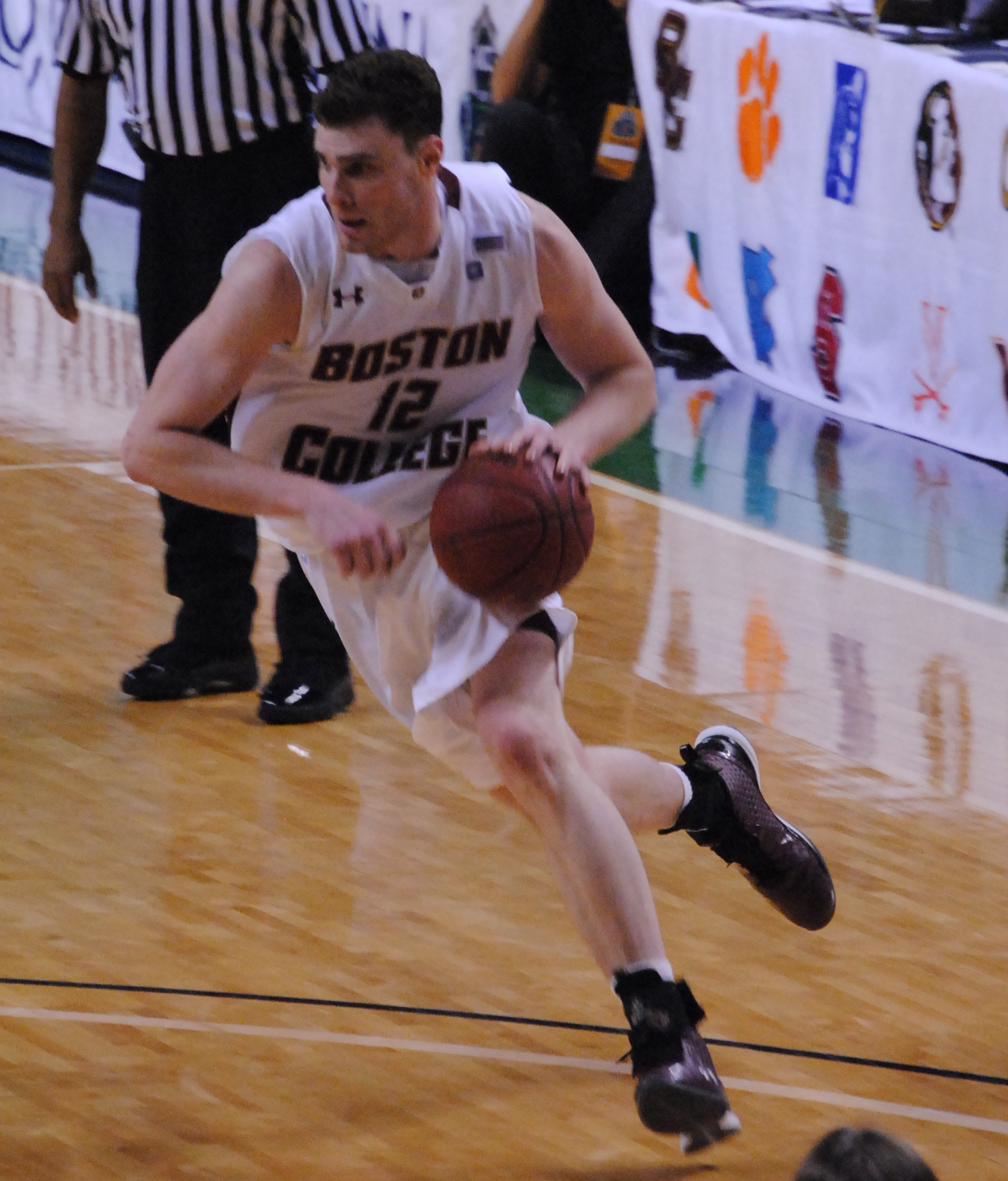
- Trapani playing for Boston College

Personal information
- Born: July 1, 1988 (age 38) Madison, Connecticut, U.S.
- Listed height: 6 ft 8 in (2.03 m)
- Listed weight: 232 lb (105 kg)

Career information
- High school: Daniel Hand (Madison, Connecticut)
- College: Vermont (2006–2007); Boston College (2008–2011)
- NBA draft: 2011: undrafted
- Playing career: 2011–2019
- Position: Power forward / small forward

Career history
- 2011: A.S. Junior Casale
- 2011–2012: Fulgor Libertas Forlì
- 2012: Maine Red Claws
- 2012–2013: Medi Bayreuth
- 2013–2014: Spirou Charleroi
- 2014–2015: SPO Rouen Basket
- 2015–2016: Cholet Basket
- 2016–2017: ICL Manresa
- 2018–2019: Orlandina Basket

Career highlights
- 2× Third-team All-ACC (2010, 2011); America East All-Rookie team (2007)

Joseph Charles Trapani (born July 1, 1988) is an American-Italian former basketball player. He played college basketball for the Vermont Catamounts and Boston College Eagles.

== College career ==
Trapani played at Daniel Hand High School in Madison, Connecticut and initially chose to play college basketball at the University of Vermont after bigger-named schools such as Virginia and Boston College wanted him to spend a year in prep school. He averaged 11.4 points and 4.4 rebounds per game and was named to the America East Conference All-Rookie team in 2007. In the offseason, Trapani decided that he wanted to play at a higher level of competition and transferred to Boston College of the Atlantic Coast Conference. Trapani was a three-year starter for the Eagles, earning third-team All-ACC honors as a junior in 2009–10 and as a senior in 2010–11.

== Professional career ==
Following the close of his college career, Trapani was not drafted in the 2011 NBA draft and the 2011 lockout prevented him attending an NBA training camp. He signed with A.S. Junior Casale of Italy's Lega Basket Serie A, but left the club early in the season due to contract issues, moving to Fulgor Libertas Forlì and then closing the 2011–12 season with the Maine Red Claws of the NBA Development League. After stints with Medi Bayreuth in Germany and Spirou Charleroi in Belgium, Trapani signed with SPO Rouen Basket of France's top division for the 2014–15 season. He averaged 10.2 points and 7.5 rebounds for the club before being lost for the season with a shoulder injury in March 2015.

On September 14, 2015, Trapani signed with Cholet Basket for the 2015–16 season.

Trapani signed with ICL Manresa of Spain's Liga ACB on August 7, 2016.
