= Daniel Hand =

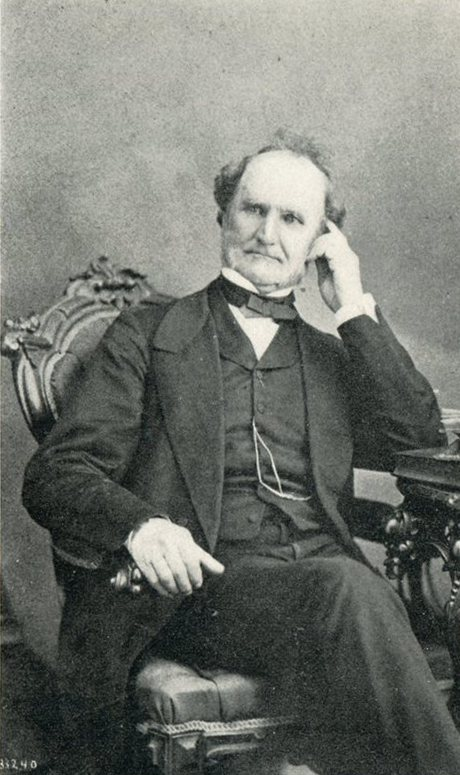
Daniel Hand

Daniel Hand (born July 16, 1801, in Madison, Connecticut), was an American businessman, abolitionist, and philanthropist from Connecticut. He funded the construction of Hand Academy, which later became Daniel Hand High School in Connecticut. He established a significant fund to educate African Americans in the South.

Hand's philanthropic endeavors extended beyond education. He was actively involved in supporting various charitable organizations and causes. His contributions were pivotal in the advancement of education for African Americans during the Reconstruction era. The Daniel Hand Fund for the Education of Colored People, established through his generosity, provided substantial resources for schools and institutions dedicated to African American education in the Southern United States.

Hand's commitment to abolitionism and his efforts to improve the lives of freed slaves and their descendants highlight his significant impact on American society in the 19th century. His legacy continues to be remembered through the institutions and programs he helped establish and fund.
