= 2017–18 EuroLeague regular season =

The 2017–18 EuroLeague Regular Season are played from 12 October 2017 to 6 April 2018. A total of 16 teams will compete in the regular season to decide the eight places of the playoffs.

Times since 2 November 2017 up to 23 March 2018 are CET (UTC+1), times up to 27 October 2017 and since 29 March 2018 are CEST (UTC+2).

== Format ==
In the regular season, teams play against each other home-and-away in a round-robin format. The eight first qualified teams will advance to the Playoffs, while the last eight qualified teams will be eliminated. The matchdays are from 12 October 2017 to 6 April 2018.

=== Tiebreakers ===
When all teams have played each other twice:

1. Best record in head-to-head games between all tied teams.
2. Higher cumulative score difference in head-to-head games between all tied teams.
3. Higher cumulative score difference for the entire regular season.
4. Higher total of points scored for the entire regular season.
5. Higher sum of quotients of points in favor and points against of each match played in the regular season.

If a tiebreaker does not resolve a tie completely, a new tiebreak process is initiated with only those teams that remain tied. All points scored in extra periods will not be counted in the standings, nor for any tie-break situation.

== League table ==
Pos	Team	Pld	W	L	PF	PA	PD	Qualification
1	(Russia) CSKA Moscow	30	24	6	2675	2377	+298	Advance to Playoffs
2	(Turkey) Fenerbahçe Doğuş	30	21	9	2381	2208	+173	Advance to Playoffs
3	(Greece) Olympiacos	30	19	11	2268	2250	+18	Advance to Playoffs
4	(Greece) Panathinaikos Superfoods	30	19	11	2334	2291	+43	Advance to Playoffs
5	(Spain) Real Madrid	30	19	11	2576	2375	+201	Advance to Playoffs
6	(Lithuania) Žalgiris	30	18	12	2417	2389	+28	Advance to Playoffs
7	(Spain) Kirolbet Baskonia	30	16	14	2487	2373	+114	Advance to Playoffs
8	(Russia) Khimki	30	16	14	2338	2352	−14	Advance to Playoffs
9	(Spain) Unicaja	30	13	17	2347	2435	−88	
10	(Israel) Maccabi Tel Aviv	30	13	17	2440	2530	−90	
11	(Spain) Valencia Basket	30	12	18	2336	2420	−84	
12	(Germany) Brose Bamberg	30	11	19	2309	2446	−137	
13	(Spain) FC Barcelona Lassa	30	11	19	2456	2404	+52	
14	(Serbia) Crvena zvezda mts	30	11	19	2333	2515	−182	
15	(Italy) AX Armani Exchange Olimpia	30	10	20	2407	2530	−123	
16	(Turkey) Anadolu Efes	30	7	23	2321	2530	−209	

Source: EuroLeague
Rules for classification: All points scored in extra period(s) will not be counted in the standings, nor for any tie-break situation.

=== Positions by round ===
The table lists the positions of teams after completion of each round. In order to preserve chronological evolvements, any postponed matches are not included in the round at which they were originally scheduled, but added to the full round they were played immediately afterwards. For example, if a match is scheduled for round 13, but then postponed and played between rounds 16 and 17, it will be added to the standings for round 16.

Team \ Round	1	2	3	4	5	6	7	8	9	10	11	12	13	14	15	16	17	18	19	20	21	22	23	24	25	26	27	28	29	30
CSKA Moscow	5	9	6	4	2	1	1	1	1	1	1	1	1	1	1	1	1	1	1	1	1	1	1	1	1	1	1	1	1	1
Fenerbahçe Doğuş	9	8	7	7	7	4	4	4	3	3	3	3	3	4	5	5	5	4	2	2	3	3	3	3	3	3	2	2	2	2
Olympiacos	4	3	3	2	3	6	2	2	2	2	2	2	2	2	2	2	3	2	3	5	2	2	2	2	2	2	3	3	3	3
Panathinaikos Superfoods	16	12	13	11	12	9	8	6	4	4	5	4	4	3	3	3	2	5	5	4	5	4	7	7	6	6	6	5	5	4
Real Madrid	3	1	1	1	1	3	6	3	5	7	8	8	7	6	6	4	4	3	4	3	4	5	4	5	4	4	4	4	4	5
Žalgiris	7	11	8	10	11	8	7	8	7	8	7	6	5	5	4	6	6	6	6	6	6	6	5	4	5	7	5	7	6	6
Kirolbet Baskonia	13	14	16	15	15	14	13	11	11	11	9	9	9	9	9	9	9	9	9	9	9	9	9	9	9	8	8	8	7	7
Khimki	6	4	2	5	4	2	3	7	8	6	6	7	6	8	8	7	8	7	7	7	7	7	6	6	7	5	7	6	8	8
Unicaja	8	10	11	14	13	10	11	14	14	16	16	13	11	10	10	10	10	10	10	10	10	10	10	10	10	11	10	13	10	9
Maccabi Tel Aviv	2	2	4	6	6	5	5	5	6	5	4	5	8	7	7	8	7	8	8	8	8	8	8	8	8	9	9	9	9	10
Valencia Basket	11	7	5	3	5	7	10	12	12	12	13	14	15	15	14	14	14	14	14	13	14	12	13	12	12	14	12	12	13	11
Brose Bamberg	15	16	12	9	8	11	9	9	9	9	10	10	10	11	12	13	13	12	13	14	11	13	11	13	14	12	13	10	11	12
FC Barcelona Lassa	1	5	9	12	9	12	12	10	10	10	11	12	13	13	13	12	12	13	11	12	13	15	15	15	15	13	15	15	15	13
Crvena zvezda mts	10	6	10	8	10	13	15	16	16	15	12	11	12	12	11	11	11	11	12	11	12	11	12	11	11	10	11	11	12	14
AX Armani Exchange Olimpia	12	13	14	13	14	16	16	13	13	14	15	16	14	14	16	15	16	15	15	15	15	14	14	14	13	15	14	14	14	15
Anadolu Efes	14	15	15	16	16	15	14	15	15	13	14	15	16	16	15	16	15	16	16	16	16	16	16	16	16	16	16	16	16	16

== Matches ==
=== Round 1 ===
12 October 2017	CSKA Moscow (Russia)	93–84	(Italy) AX Armani Exchange Olimpia	Moscow
19:00	Scoring by quarter: 16–30, 22–18, 27–16, 28–20
	Pts: Higgins 21; Rebs: Clyburn 12; Asts: Rodríguez 4 PIR: Clyburn 28	Boxscore	Pts: Goudelock 17; Rebs: Tarczewski 6 Asts: Theodore 6 PIR: Micov 22	Arena: Megasport Arena; Attendance: 7,233; Referees: Saša Pukl (SLO), Spiros Gkontas (GRE), Tomislav Hordov (CRO)

12 October 2017	Anadolu Efes (Turkey)	74–88	(Spain) Real Madrid	Istanbul
19:00	Scoring by quarter: 19–28, 17–17, 20–17, 18–26
	Pts: McCollum 26; Rebs: Ledo 9 Asts: Simon 3 PIR: McCollum 30	Boxscore	Pts: Dončić 27; Rebs: Ayón 10; Asts: Ayón, Dončić 4 PIR: Dončić 32	Arena: Sinan Erdem Dome; Attendance: 6,788; Referees: Robert Lottermoser (GER), Carmelo Paternicò (ITA), Ioannis Foufis (GRE)

12 October 2017	Brose Bamberg (Germany)	71–88	(Israel) Maccabi Tel Aviv	Bamberg
20:00	Scoring by quarter: 20–14, 16–23, 23–18, 12–33
	Pts: Zisis 16; Rebs: Radošević 6 Asts: Hickman, Zisis 5 PIR: Zisis 18	Boxscore	Pts: Jackson 27; Rebs: Jackson 7 Asts: Jackson 9 PIR: Jackson 41	Arena: Brose Arena; Attendance: 6,150; Referees: Juan Carlos García González (ESP), Mario Majkič (SLO), Jurgis Laurinavičius (LTU)

12 October 2017	Olympiacos (Greece)	75–64	(Spain) Kirolbet Baskonia	Heraklion
21:00	Scoring by quarter: 16–12, 25–21, 19–16, 15–15
	Pts: Printezis 17; Rebs: Thompson 7 Asts: Papanikolaou 4 PIR: Papanikolaou 22	Boxscore	Pts: Shengelia 13; Rebs: three players 5 Asts: Shengelia 4 PIR: Voigtmann 17	Arena: Heraklion Arena; Attendance: 4,621; Referees: Borys Rhyzhyk (UKR), Fernando Rocha (POR), Amit Balak (ISR)

12 October 2017	Unicaja (Spain)	68–67	(Turkey) Fenerbahçe Doğuş	Málaga
21:00	Scoring by quarter: 20–20, 16–21, 14–16, 18–10
	Pts: Shermadini 10; Rebs: Augustine 6 Asts: three players 3 PIR: Milosavljević 15	Boxscore	Pts: Sloukas 15; Rebs: Veselý 8 Asts: Sloukas 7 PIR: Sloukas 23	Arena: Palacio de Deportes José María Martín Carpena; Attendance: 8,267; Referees: Christos Christodoulou (GRE), Ilija Belošević (SRB), Rain Peerandi (EST)

13 October 2017	Khimki (Russia)	75–70	(Spain) Valencia Basket	Mytishchi
19:00	Scoring by quarter: 18–17, 25–19, 16–21, 16–13
	Pts: Shved 19; Rebs: Robinson, Thomas 6 Asts: Jenkins, Shved 3 PIR: Robinson 20	Boxscore	Pts: Green 22; Rebs: Green 8 Asts: Vives 6 PIR: Green 29	Arena: Mytishchi Arena; Attendance: 6,579; Referees: Luigi Lamonica (ITA), Oļegs Latiševs (LAT), Miloš Koljenšić (MNE)

13 October 2017	Žalgiris (Lithuania)	78–76	(Serbia) Crvena zvezda mts	Kaunas
19:00	Scoring by quarter: 15–13, 28–27, 10–17, 25–19
	Pts: Jankūnas 15; Rebs: Ulanovas 6 Asts: Micić 4 PIR: Jankūnas 28	Boxscore	Pts: Bjelica 18; Rebs: Lessort 5 Asts: Rochestie 7 PIR: Bjelica 17	Arena: Žalgirio Arena; Attendance: 11,456; Referees: Elias Koromilas (GRE), Matej Boltauzer (SLO), Anne Panther (GER)

13 October 2017	FC Barcelona Lassa (Spain)	98–71	(Greece) Panathinaikos Superfoods	Barcelona
21:00	Scoring by quarter: 24–20, 16–15, 25–19, 33–17
	Pts: Séraphin 24; Rebs: Moerman 11; Asts: Heurtel 9 PIR: Séraphin 31	Boxscore	Pts: Pappas 20; Rebs: Singleton 5 Asts: Calathes 6 PIR: Pappas 25	Arena: Palau Blaugrana; Attendance: 5,424; Referees: Damir Javor (SLO), Emin Moğulkoç (TUR), Jakub Zamojski (POL)

=== Round 2 ===
19 October 2017	Maccabi Tel Aviv (Israel)	74–68	(Spain) Kirolbet Baskonia	Tel Aviv
20:05	Scoring by quarter: 19–16, 20–14, 17–23, 18–15
	Pts: Cole 24; Rebs: Tyus 8 Asts: DiBartolomeo 6 PIR: Cole 24	Boxscore	Pts: Beaubois 22; Rebs: Voigtmann 6 Asts: Granger 6 PIR: Beaubois 23	Arena: Menora Mivtachim Arena; Attendance: 10,600; Referees: Damir Javor (SLO), Elias Koromilas (GRE), Mehdi Difallah (FRA)

19 October 2017	Panathinaikos Superfoods (Greece)	93–83	(Germany) Brose Bamberg	Athens
20:15	Scoring by quarter: 22–15, 21–20, 26–21, 24–27
	Pts: Calathes 23; Rebs: Singleton 10; Asts: Calathes 6 PIR: Calathes 25	Boxscore	Pts: Hickman, Radošević 19; Rebs: Radošević 6 Asts: Nikolić 6 PIR: Radošević 26	Arena: Olympic Indoor Hall; Attendance: 7,812; Referees: Milivoje Jovčić (SRB), Emilio Pérez Pizarro (ESP), Tomislav Hordov (CRO)

19 October 2017	AX Armani Exchange Olimpia (Italy)	86–92(OT)	(Turkey) Fenerbahçe Doğuş	Assago
20:45	Scoring by quarter: 21–23, 17–14, 16–27, 26–16, Overtime: 6–12
	Pts: Bertāns, M'Baye 16; Rebs: Tarczewski 6 Asts: Theodore 7 PIR: Bertāns, Theodore 17	Boxscore	Pts: Sloukas 17; Rebs: Melli 11; Asts: Sloukas 9 PIR: Sloukas 27	Arena: Mediolanum Forum; Attendance: 8,281; Referees: Miguel Pérez Pérez (ESP), Ioannis Foufis (GRE), Jakub Zamojski (POL)

19 October 2017	Real Madrid (Spain)	82–69	(Russia) CSKA Moscow	Madrid
21:00	Scoring by quarter: 20–15, 25–18, 11–20, 26–16
	Pts: Randolph 16; Rebs: Ayón 11; Asts: Taylor 4 PIR: Dončić 21	Boxscore	Pts: Clyburn 15; Rebs: Clyburn 9 Asts: De Colo 3 PIR: Clyburn 19	Arena: WiZink Center; Attendance: 11,077; Referees: Luigi Lamonica (ITA), Borys Rhyzhyk (UKR), Emin Moğulkoç (TUR)

20 October 2017	Khimki (Russia)	85–77	(Lithuania) Žalgiris	Mytishchi
19:00	Scoring by quarter: 21–15, 25–21, 17–17, 22–24
	Pts: Robinson 19; Rebs: Robinson 10; Asts: Marković 9 PIR: Robinson 28	Boxscore	Pts: Jankūnas 24; Rebs: Jankūnas, White 8 Asts: Pangos 10; PIR: Jankūnas 36	Arena: Mytishchi Arena; Attendance: 5,346; Referees: Saša Pukl (SLO), Robert Lottermoser (GER), Carlos Peruga (ESP)

20 October 2017	Crvena zvezda mts (Serbia)	90–82	(Spain) FC Barcelona Lassa	Belgrade
19:00	Scoring by quarter: 24–13, 20–19, 18–25, 28–25
	Pts: Bjelica 23; Rebs: Antić, Lessort 9 Asts: Rochestie 7 PIR: Rochestie 27	Boxscore	Pts: Séraphin 16; Rebs: Tomić 8 Asts: Heurtel 11; PIR: Heurtel 21	Arena: Aleksandar Nikolić Hall; Attendance: 6,086; Referees: Oļegs Latiševs (LAT), Carmelo Paternicò (ITA), Piotr Pastusiak (POL)

20 October 2017	Olympiacos (Greece)	80–75	(Spain) Unicaja	Piraeus
20:00	Scoring by quarter: 21–11, 16–22, 22–14, 21–28
	Pts: Thompson 15; Rebs: Printezis 6 Asts: Roberts 4 PIR: Printezis, Thompson 14	Boxscore	Pts: McCallum, Milosavljević 14; Rebs: Musli 7 Asts: Díaz 3 PIR: Musli 19	Arena: Peace and Friendship Stadium; Attendance: 7,228; Referees: Sreten Radović (CRO), Matej Boltauzer (SLO), Viesturs Ozols (LAT)

20 October 2017	Valencia Basket (Spain)	78–71	(Turkey) Anadolu Efes	Valencia
21:00	Scoring by quarter: 19–13, 19–25, 28–10, 12–23
	Pts: Green 24; Rebs: Dubljević 10; Asts: Vives 5 PIR: Green 33	Boxscore	Pts: Štimac 22; Rebs: Štimac 6 Asts: Adams, Štimac 4 PIR: Štimac 27	Arena: Fuente de San Luis; Attendance: 6,267; Referees: Fernando Rocha (POR), Sašo Petek (SLO), Anne Panther (GER)

=== Round 3 ===
24 October 2017	Khimki (Russia)	85–78	(Serbia) Crvena zvezda mts	Mytishchi
19:00	Scoring by quarter: 20–28, 23–16, 21–11, 21–23
	Pts: Anderson 24; Rebs: Thomas 10; Asts: Shved 9 PIR: Anderson 28	Boxscore	Pts: Bjelica 15; Rebs: Lessort 8 Asts: Rochestie 5 PIR: Lessort 18	Arena: Mytishchi Arena; Attendance: 5,198; Referees: Miguel Pérez Pérez (ESP), Spiros Gkontas (GRE), Amit Balak (ISR)

24 October 2017	Maccabi Tel Aviv (Israel)	68–69	(Greece) Olympiacos	Tel Aviv
20:05	Scoring by quarter: 18–18, 15–17, 12–16, 23–18
	Pts: Cole 22; Rebs: Tyus 8 Asts: Jackson, Roll 3 PIR: Cole 26	Boxscore	Pts: Printezis 21; Rebs: Papanikolaou 9 Asts: Roberts, Thompson 3 PIR: Milutinov 19	Arena: Menora Mivtachim Arena; Attendance: 10,500; Referees: Saša Pukl (SLO), Emilio Pérez Pizarro (ESP), Tomislav Hordov (CRO)

24 October 2017	Real Madrid (Spain)	100–90	(Italy) AX Armani Exchange Olimpia	Madrid
21:00	Scoring by quarter: 30–28, 24–26, 27–20, 19–16
	Pts: Dončić 27; Rebs: Dončić 8 Asts: Ayón, Campazzo 6 PIR: Dončić 41	Boxscore	Pts: Goudelock, Gudaitis 20; Rebs: Gudaitis 7 Asts: Theodore 5 PIR: Gudaitis 28	Arena: WiZink Center; Attendance: 8,067; Referees: Damir Javor (SLO), Petri Mäntylä (FIN), Marcin Kowalski (POL)

24 October 2017	FC Barcelona Lassa (Spain)	75–81	(Lithuania) Žalgiris	Barcelona
21:00	Scoring by quarter: 21–24, 18–21, 15–17, 21–19
	Pts: Hanga 19; Rebs: Hanga 10; Asts: Koponen 6 PIR: Hanga 24	Boxscore	Pts: Micić 20; Rebs: Jankūnas 7 Asts: Micić 8 PIR: Micić 24	Arena: Palau Blaugrana; Attendance: 5,034; Referees: Luigi Lamonica (ITA), Ilija Belošević (SRB), Milan Nedović (SLO)

25 October 2017	CSKA Moscow (Russia)	81–63	(Greece) Panathinaikos Superfoods	Moscow
19:00	Scoring by quarter: 27–15, 16–18, 17–18, 21–12
	Pts: Rodríguez 25; Rebs: Clyburn 7 Asts: Rodríguez 9 PIR: Rodríguez 29	Boxscore	Pts: Rivers 17; Rebs: Antetokounmpo, Singleton 6 Asts: Calathes 4 PIR: Lekavičius, Singleton 15	Arena: Universal Sports Hall CSKA; Attendance: 4,906; Referees: Sreten Radović (CRO), Oļegs Latiševs (LAT), Fernando Rocha (POR)

25 October 2017	Fenerbahçe Doğuş (Turkey)	81–70	(Turkey) Anadolu Efes	Istanbul
19:45	Scoring by quarter: 15–20, 19–14, 28–18, 19–18
	Pts: Veselý 15; Rebs: Melli 8 Asts: Wanamaker 7 PIR: Wanamaker 20	Boxscore	Pts: Simon 20; Rebs: three players 5 Asts: Simon 4 PIR: Simon 23	Arena: Ülker Sports Arena; Attendance: 10,977; Referees: Daniel Hierrezuelo (ESP), Milivoje Jovčić (SRB), Arturas Šukys (LTU)

25 October 2017	Kirolbet Baskonia (Spain)	63–80	(Spain) Valencia Basket	Vitoria-Gasteiz
20:30	Scoring by quarter: 13–28, 26–22, 15–17, 9–13
	Pts: Shengelia 22; Rebs: Shengelia 11; Asts: Granger 9 PIR: Shengelia 26	Boxscore	Pts: Green, Pleiß 15; Rebs: Pleiß 7 Asts: Doornekamp, Van Rossom 4 PIR: Dubljević 21	Arena: Fernando Buesa Arena; Attendance: 9,196; Referees: Christos Christodoulou (GRE), Piotr Pastusiak (POL), Mario Majkič (SLO)

25 October 2017	Unicaja (Spain)	76–80	(Germany) Brose Bamberg	Málaga
21:00	Scoring by quarter: 22–24, 13–15, 23–15, 18–26
	Pts: Nedović 26; Rebs: Augustine, Shermadini 5 Asts: three players 3 PIR: Nedović 25	Boxscore	Pts: Hickman 18; Rebs: Rubit 11; Asts: Hackett 5 PIR: Rubit 27	Arena: Palacio de Deportes José María Martín Carpena; Attendance: 6,978; Referees: Carmelo Paternicò (ITA), Elias Koromilas (GRE), Aare Halliko (EST)

=== Round 4 ===
26 October 2017	Crvena zvezda mts (Serbia)	87–84	(Israel) Maccabi Tel Aviv	Belgrade
19:00	Scoring by quarter: 19–24, 20–25, 23–12, 25–23
	Pts: Rochestie 22; Rebs: Lazić 7 Asts: Feldeine 8 PIR: Feldeine 26	Boxscore	Pts: Thomas 28; Rebs: Tyus 8 Asts: Cole 6 PIR: Thomas 31	Arena: Kombank Arena; Attendance: 8,230; Referees: Luigi Lamonica (ITA), Carlos Peruga (ESP), Anne Panther (GER)

26 October 2017	Žalgiris (Lithuania)	66–87	(Spain) Real Madrid	Kaunas
19:00	Scoring by quarter: 16–18, 15–22, 19–23, 16–24
	Pts: Pangos 20; Rebs: Jankūnas, Ulanovas 4 Asts: Pangos 5 PIR: Pangos 25	Boxscore	Pts: Dončić 28; Rebs: Dončić 9 Asts: Campazzo 6 PIR: Dončić 35	Arena: Žalgirio Arena; Attendance: 13,148; Referees: Matej Boltauzer (SLO), Jakub Zamojski (POL), Spiros Gkontas (GRE)

26 October 2017	Olympiacos (Greece)	92–75	(Russia) Khimki	Piraeus
20:15	Scoring by quarter: 22–20, 27–20, 25–15, 18–20
	Pts: Milutinov 17; Rebs: three players 5 Asts: three players 3 PIR: Printezis 18	Boxscore	Pts: Shved 23; Rebs: Robinson 11; Asts: Shved 5 PIR: Shved 26	Arena: Peace and Friendship Stadium; Attendance: 7,381; Referees: Damir Javor (SLO), Carlos Cortés (ESP), Petri Mäntylä (FIN)

26 October 2017	AX Armani Exchange Olimpia (Italy)	78–74	(Spain) FC Barcelona Lassa	Assago
21:00	Scoring by quarter: 17–22, 22–17, 15–14, 24–21
	Pts: Theodore 19; Rebs: Gudaitis 11; Asts: Theodore 7 PIR: Theodore 24	Boxscore	Pts: Heurtel, Navarro 13; Rebs: Moerman 9 Asts: Heurtel 7 PIR: Heurtel 16	Arena: Mediolanum Forum; Attendance: 7,345; Referees: Saša Pukl (SLO), Amit Balak (ISR), Siniša Herceg (CRO)

27 October 2017	Anadolu Efes (Turkey)	80–98	(Russia) CSKA Moscow	Istanbul
18:45	Scoring by quarter: 26–27, 17–27, 17–19, 20–25
	Pts: Simon 23; Rebs: Dunston 7 Asts: three players 4 PIR: Simon 24	Boxscore	Pts: Clyburn 20; Rebs: Hunter, Kurbanov 6 Asts: De Colo 5 PIR: De Colo 26	Arena: Sinan Erdem Dome; Attendance: 6,540; Referees: Miguel Pérez Pérez (ESP), Mario Majkič (SLO), Uroš Obrknežević (SRB)

27 October 2017	Brose Bamberg (Germany)	78–72	(Spain) Kirolbet Baskonia	Bamberg
20:00	Scoring by quarter: 17–17, 18–15, 25–19, 18–21
	Pts: Wright 13; Rebs: Hackett 6 Asts: Lô 7 PIR: Wright 20	Boxscore	Pts: Granger 17; Rebs: Shengelia 9 Asts: Granger 6 PIR: Granger 16	Arena: Brose Arena; Attendance: 6,150; Referees: Sreten Radović (CRO), Oļegs Latiševs (LAT), Nick van den Broeck (BEL)

27 October 2017	Panathinaikos Superfoods (Greece)	70–68	(Turkey) Fenerbahçe Doğuş	Athens
20:30	Scoring by quarter: 19–21, 17–23, 17–11, 17–13
	Pts: Pappas 24; Rebs: Singleton 8 Asts: Calathes 6 PIR: Pappas 23	Boxscore	Pts: Veselý 15; Rebs: Melli 8 Asts: Sloukas 4 PIR: Melli 24	Arena: Olympic Indoor Hall; Attendance: 12,680; Referees: Borys Ryzhyk (UKR), Robert Lottermoser (GER), Benjamín Jiménez (ESP)

27 October 2017	Valencia Basket (Spain)	91–53	(Spain) Unicaja	Valencia
21:00	Scoring by quarter: 31–11, 26–14, 16–17, 18–11
	Pts: Green 19; Rebs: Pleiß 6 Asts: Van Rossom 8 PIR: Abalde, Thomas 19	Boxscore	Pts: Waczyński 15; Rebs: three players 4 Asts: Suárez 3 PIR: Waczyński 11	Arena: Fuente de San Luis; Attendance: 6,165; Referees: Emin Moğulkoç (TUR), Tomislav Hordov (CRO), Mykola Ambrosov (UKR)

=== Round 5 ===
2 November 2017	Crvena zvezda mts (Serbia)	69–75	(Germany) Brose Bamberg	Belgrade
18:00	Scoring by quarter: 18–30, 16–13, 19–16, 16–16
	Pts: Rochestie 22; Rebs: Lessort 9 Asts: Feldeine 4 PIR: Rochestie 24	Boxscore	Pts: Rubit 15; Rebs: Radošević 7 Asts: Nikolić 4 PIR: Radošević 16	Arena: Kombank Arena; Attendance: 5,892; Referees: Juan Carlos García González (ESP), Ioannis Foufis (GRE), Joseph Bissang (FRA)

2 November 2017	Fenerbahçe Doğuş (Turkey)	79–66	(Spain) Valencia Basket	Istanbul
18:45	Scoring by quarter: 20–18, 18–12, 19–19, 22–17
	Pts: Datome 16; Rebs: Melli 6 Asts: Sloukas 7 PIR: Veselý 23	Boxscore	Pts: San Emeterio 11; Rebs: Thomas 8 Asts: Van Rossom, Vives 4 PIR: Dubljević 14	Arena: Ülker Sports Arena; Attendance: 10,215; Referees: Ilija Belošević (SRB), Matej Boltauzer (SLO), Elias Koromilas (GRE)

2 November 2017	Kirolbet Baskonia (Spain)	85–84	(Greece) Panathinaikos Superfoods	Vitoria-Gasteiz
20:00	Scoring by quarter: 27–24, 20–21, 16–22, 22–17
	Pts: Granger 20; Rebs: Poirier 5 Asts: three players 3 PIR: Granger 23	Boxscore	Pts: Pappas 22; Rebs: Rivers 9 Asts: Calathes 14; PIR: Calathes 24	Arena: Fernando Buesa Arena; Attendance: 13,108; Referees: Saša Pukl (SLO), Milivoje Jovčić (SRB), Amit Balak (ISR)

2 November 2017	Maccabi Tel Aviv (Israel)	79–68	(Italy) AX Armani Exchange Olimpia	Tel Aviv
20:05	Scoring by quarter: 18–14, 21–15, 21–13, 19–26
	Pts: Thomas 14; Rebs: Tyus 15; Asts: Cole 8 PIR: Tyus 22	Boxscore	Pts: Bertāns 13; Rebs: Tarczewski 7 Asts: Bertāns 4 PIR: Gudaitis 16	Arena: Menora Mivtachim Arena; Attendance: 10,600; Referees: Daniel Hierrenzuelo (ESP), Borys Ryzhyk (UKR), Mehdi Difallah (FRA)

2 November 2017	Real Madrid (Spain)	80–86	(Russia) Khimki	Madrid
21:00	Scoring by quarter: 23–25, 16–20, 20–21, 21–20
	Pts: Dončić 12; Rebs: Ayón 10; Asts: Causeur 5 PIR: Dončić 18	Boxscore	Pts: Shved 20; Rebs: Thomas 6 Asts: Marković 8 PIR: Shved 21	Arena: WiZink Center; Attendance: 9,482; Referees: Christos Christodoulou (GRE), Robert Lottermoser (GER), Piotr Pastusiak (POL)

3 November 2017	CSKA Moscow (Russia)	94–91	(Lithuania) Žalgiris	Moscow
18:00	Scoring by quarter: 22–19, 29–17, 18–26, 25–29
	Pts: Clyburn 26; Rebs: Hunter 7 Asts: De Colo 10; PIR: De Colo 25	Boxscore	Pts: Micić 20; Rebs: Jankūnas 5 Asts: Micić 7 PIR: Micić 28	Arena: Megasport Arena; Attendance: 7,103; Referees: Damir Javor (SLO), Benjamín Jiménez (ESP), Siniša Herceg (CRO)

3 November 2017	Anadolu Efes (Turkey)	74–79	(Spain) Unicaja	Istanbul
18:30	Scoring by quarter: 19–25, 16–10, 24–18, 15–26
	Pts: Štimac 17; Rebs: Štimac 11; Asts: Adams 6 PIR: Štimac 23	Boxscore	Pts: three players 13; Rebs: Augustine, Suárez 8 Asts: Nedović 8 PIR: Augustine 18	Arena: Sinan Erdem Dome; Attendance: 4,112; Referees: Luigi Lamonica (ITA), Petri Mäntylä (FIN), Marcin Kowalski (POL)

3 November 2017	FC Barcelona Lassa (Spain)	73–51	(Greece) Olympiacos	Barcelona
21:00	Scoring by quarter: 14–14, 18–12, 17–15, 24–10
	Pts: Séraphin 13; Rebs: Hanga 6 Asts: Pressey, Heurtel 5 PIR: Oriola 15	Boxscore	Pts: Papapetrou 11; Rebs: Milutinov, Printezis 6 Asts: Papanikolaou 4 PIR: Milutinov 16	Arena: Palau Blaugrana; Attendance: 5,743; Referees: Sreten Radović (CRO), Fernando Rocha (POR), Miloš Koljenšić (MNE)

=== Round 6 ===
9 November 2017	CSKA Moscow (Russia)	94–67	(Spain) Valencia Basket	Moscow
18:00	Scoring by quarter: 20–19, 23–19, 30–16, 21–13
	Pts: De Colo 23; Rebs: Hunter 10; Asts: Rodríguez 7 PIR: De Colo 28	Boxscore	Pts: Pleiß 12; Rebs: Pleiß 7 Asts: Doornekamp 3 PIR: Pleiß 17	Arena: Megasport Arena; Attendance: 7,015; Referees: Sreten Radović (CRO), Jakub Zamojski (POL), Erşan Kartal (TUR)

9 November 2017	Maccabi Tel Aviv (Israel)	90–83	(Spain) Real Madrid	Tel Aviv
20:05	Scoring by quarter: 22–30, 25–12, 17–24, 26–17
	Pts: Thomas 21; Rebs: Bolden, Tyus 7 Asts: Cole 5 PIR: Tyus 20	Boxscore	Pts: Dončić 19; Rebs: Randolph 9 Asts: Dončić 6 PIR: Dončić 30	Arena: Menora Mivtachim Arena; Attendance: 10,728; Referees: Saša Pukl (SLO), Elias Koromilas (GRE), Carmelo Paternicò (ITA)

9 November 2017	AX Armani Exchange Olimpia (Italy)	62–94	(Lithuania) Žalgiris	Assago
20:45	Scoring by quarter: 20–25, 11–25, 10–20, 21–24
	Pts: Goudelock 13; Rebs: Tarczewski 10; Asts: three players 2 PIR: Tarczewski 15	Boxscore	Pts: Jankūnas 13; Rebs: four players 5 Asts: Micić 7 PIR: Ulanovas 18	Arena: Mediolanum Forum; Attendance: 7,513; Referees: Juan Carlos García González (ESP), Piotr Pastusiak (POL), Clemens Fritz (GER)

9 November 2017	FC Barcelona Lassa (Spain)	85–89	(Turkey) Anadolu Efes	Barcelona
21:00	Scoring by quarter: 15–26, 20–16, 22–25, 28–22
	Pts: Séraphin 19; Rebs: three players 4 Asts: Heurtel 9 PIR: Claver 15	Boxscore	Pts: Štimac 22; Rebs: Dunston 9 Asts: five players 2 PIR: Štimac 29	Arena: Palau Blaugrana; Attendance: 4,913; Referees: Robert Lottermoser (GER), Borys Ryzhyk (UKR), Jurgis Laurinavičius (LTU)

10 November 2017	Khimki (Russia)	91–90	(Spain) Kirolbet Baskonia	Mytishchi
18:00	Scoring by quarter: 18–21, 22–27, 21–16, 30–26
	Pts: Gill, Shved 20; Rebs: Robinson 8 Asts: Shved 5 PIR: Gill 25	Boxscore	Pts: Janning 19; Rebs: Poirier 9 Asts: Granger 11; PIR: Voigtmann 20	Arena: Mytishchi Arena; Attendance: 5,559; Referees: Luigi Lamonica (ITA), Ioannis Foufis (GRE), David Romano (ISR)

10 November 2017	Olympiacos (Greece)	62–70	(Greece) Panathinaikos Superfoods	Piraeus
20:00	Scoring by quarter: 17–16, 13–19, 17–14, 15–21
	Pts: Strēlnieks 18; Rebs: Milutinov 7 Asts: Mantzaris, Papanikolaou 3 PIR: Papapetrou 17	Boxscore	Pts: Gist 15; Rebs: Gist, Singleton 6 Asts: Calathes, Vougioukas 2 PIR: Gist, Rivers 15	Arena: Peace and Friendship Stadium; Attendance: 11,039; Referees: Ilija Belošević (SRB), Matej Boltauzer (SLO), Oļegs Latiševs (LAT)

10 November 2017	Brose Bamberg (Germany)	57–80	(Turkey) Fenerbahçe Doğuş	Bamberg
20:00	Scoring by quarter: 16–21, 17–22, 13–11, 11–26
	Pts: Rubit 12; Rebs: Wright 8 Asts: Lô, Zisis 3 PIR: Mitrović 12	Boxscore	Pts: Veselý 15; Rebs: Sloukas, Wanamaker 6 Asts: Sloukas 7 PIR: Datome, Wanamaker 20	Arena: Brose Arena; Attendance: 5,920; Referees: Daniel Hierrezuelo (ESP), Tomislav Hordov (CRO), Mehdi Difallah (FRA)

10 November 2017	Unicaja (Spain)	79–65	(Serbia) Crvena zvezda mts	Málaga
20:45	Scoring by quarter: 22–12, 23–19, 18–19, 16–15
	Pts: Nedović 17; Rebs: Brooks 7 Asts: McCallum, Nedović 4 PIR: Milosavljević 19	Boxscore	Pts: three players 10; Rebs: Jovanović 8 Asts: Rochestie 6 PIR: Lessort 20	Arena: Palacio de Deportes José María Martín Carpena; Attendance: 7,521; Referees: Christos Christodoulou (GRE), Fernando Rocha (POR), Renaud Geller (BEL)

=== Round 7 ===
14 November 2017	Maccabi Tel Aviv (Israel)	72–92	(Turkey) Anadolu Efes	Tel Aviv
20:05	Scoring by quarter: 19–19, 16–28, 26–20, 11–15
	Pts: Jackson 20; Rebs: Bolden 8 Asts: Cole 4 PIR: Bolden 24	Boxscore	Pts: McCollum 31; Rebs: Štimac 13; Asts: Dunston, McCollum 3 PIR: McCollum 33	Arena: Menora Mivtachim Arena; Attendance: 10,728; Referees: Milivoje Jovčić (SRB), Juan Carlos García González (ESP), Anne Panther (GER)

14 November 2017	Panathinaikos Superfoods (Greece)	93–65	(Russia) Khimki	Athens
20:15	Scoring by quarter: 26–16, 20–11, 26–22, 21–16
	Pts: Denmon 24; Rebs: Gist 6 Asts: Calathes 11; PIR: Gist 23	Boxscore	Pts: Shved 17; Rebs: Robinson 10; Asts: Marković 5 PIR: Shved 14	Arena: Olympic Indoor Hall; Attendance: 9,315; Referees: Sreten Radović (CRO), Carlos Peruga (ESP), Sérgio Silva (POR)

14 November 2017	Kirolbet Baskonia (Spain)	105–75	(Spain) Real Madrid	Vitoria-Gasteiz
20:30	Scoring by quarter: 36–17, 28–27, 24–19, 17–12
	Pts: Beaubois 15; Rebs: Poirier 8 Asts: Huertas 6 PIR: Huertas 20	Boxscore	Pts: Dončić 18; Rebs: Tavares 7 Asts: Dončić, Randolph 4 PIR: Dončić 19	Arena: Fernando Buesa Arena; Attendance: 10,639; Referees: Fernando Rocha (POR), Spiros Gkontas (GRE), Josip Radojković (CRO)

14 November 2017	Unicaja (Spain)	83–85(OT)	(Lithuania) Žalgiris	Málaga
20:45	Scoring by quarter: 17–21, 17–20, 14–18, 24–13, Overtime: 11–13
	Pts: McCallum 19; Rebs: Brooks 11; Asts: Salin 6 PIR: Brooks 29	Boxscore	Pts: Pangos 21; Rebs: White 6 Asts: Pangos 5 PIR: Pangos 19	Arena: Palacio de Deportes José María Martín Carpena; Attendance: 6,866; Referees: Ilija Belošević (SRB), Sašo Petek (SLO), Miloš Koljenšić (MNE)

15 November 2017	Fenerbahçe Doğuş (Turkey)	83–90(OT)	(Greece) Olympiacos	Istanbul
18:45	Scoring by quarter: 17–18, 23–12, 13–27, 22–18, Overtime: 8–15
	Pts: Nunnally 22; Rebs: Nunnally 4 Asts: Datome, Nunnally 4 PIR: Nunnally 24	Boxscore	Pts: Roberts 21; Rebs: Printezis 7 Asts: Papanikolaou 6 PIR: Printezis 19	Arena: Ülker Sports Arena; Attendance: 12,828; Referees: Borys Ryzhyk (UKR), Benjamín Jiménez (ESP), Carmelo Paternicò (ITA)

15 November 2017	Crvena zvezda mts (Serbia)	59–85	(Russia) CSKA Moscow	Belgrade
19:00	Scoring by quarter: 10–22, 17–22, 7–21, 25–20
	Pts: Rochestie 15; Rebs: Bjelica, Jovanović 6 Asts: Rochestie 5 PIR: Rochestie 22	Boxscore	Pts: De Colo 16; Rebs: Hunter 10; Asts: Rodríguez 9 PIR: Hines 26	Arena: Kombank Arena; Attendance: 13,467; Referees: Daniel Hierrezuelo (ESP), Aare Halliko (EST), David Romano (ISR)

15 November 2017	Brose Bamberg (Germany)	84–81	(Spain) FC Barcelona Lassa	Nuremberg
20:00	Scoring by quarter: 12–38, 25–21, 25–17, 22–15
	Pts: Wright 16; Rebs: Rubit 9 Asts: Wright 5 PIR: Wright 25	Boxscore	Pts: Sanders 17; Rebs: Sanders, Séraphin 6 Asts: Heurtel 6 PIR: Sanders 26	Arena: Arena Nürnberger Versicherung; Attendance: 8,000; Referees: Luigi Lamonica (ITA), Matej Boltauzer (SLO), Marcin Kowalski (POL)

15 November 2017	Valencia Basket (Spain)	98–103(OT)	(Italy) AX Armani Exchange Olimpia	Valencia
20:45	Scoring by quarter: 20–19, 25–22, 19–17, 10–16, Overtime: 11–11, 13–18
	Pts: Green 22; Rebs: Doornekamp 9 Asts: Green 5 PIR: Green 24	Boxscore	Pts: Jerrells 30; Rebs: Tarczewski 10; Asts: Kalnietis, Theodore 4 PIR: Jerrells 27	Arena: Fuente de San Luis; Attendance: 5,736; Referees: Christos Christodoulou (GRE), Robert Lottermoser (GER), Oļegs Latiševs (LAT)

=== Round 8 ===
16 November 2017	Khimki (Russia)	69–77	(Israel) Maccabi Tel Aviv	Mytishchi
18:00	Scoring by quarter: 19–28, 20–14, 16–20, 14–15
	Pts: Shved 21; Rebs: Robinson 13; Asts: Monia 6 PIR: Robinson 29	Boxscore	Pts: Jackson 19; Rebs: Bolden 7 Asts: Jackson 6 PIR: Jackson 22	Arena: Mytishchi Arena; Attendance: 5,488; Referees: Fernando Rocha (POR), Emin Moğulkoç (TUR), Tomasz Trawicki (POL)

16 November 2017	Anadolu Efes (Turkey)	81–82	(Greece) Panathinaikos Superfoods	Istanbul
18:30	Scoring by quarter: 21–28, 23–20, 16–14, 21–20
	Pts: Motum 21; Rebs: Murić 6 Asts: Balbay, Simon 4 PIR: Motum 24	Boxscore	Pts: Calathes 29; Rebs: Calathes 9 Asts: Calathes 10; PIR: Calathes 42	Arena: Sinan Erdem Dome; Attendance: 5,245; Referees: Carmelo Paternicò (ITA), Piotr Pastusiak (POL), Milija Vojinović (SRB)

16 November 2017	Žalgiris (Lithuania)	77–97	(Spain) Kirolbet Baskonia	Kaunas
19:00	Scoring by quarter: 15–21, 17–33, 25–16, 20–27
	Pts: Jankūnas 20; Rebs: Kavaliauskas 4 Asts: Micić 8 PIR: Jankūnas 20	Boxscore	Pts: Beaubois, Shengelia 19; Rebs: Shengelia, Voigtmann 8 Asts: Granger 7 PIR: Shengelia, Voigtmann 26	Arena: Žalgirio Arena; Attendance: 11,246; Referees: Damir Javor (SLO), Joseph Bissang (FRA), Petros Papapetrou (GRE)

16 November 2017	Real Madrid (Spain)	89–57	(Spain) Unicaja	Madrid
21:00	Scoring by quarter: 19–12, 21–15, 22–11, 27–19
	Pts: Carroll 17; Rebs: Dončić 10; Asts: Dončić 6 PIR: Dončić 28	Boxscore	Pts: Díaz, Milosavljević 10; Rebs: Díez, Milosavljević 6 Asts: Soluade 4 PIR: Milosavljević 13	Arena: WiZink Center; Attendance: 8,260; Referees: Sreten Radović (CRO), Sérgio Silva (POR), Moritz Reiter (GER)

17 November 2017	CSKA Moscow (Russia)	93–95(OT)	(Turkey) Fenerbahçe Doğuş	Moscow
18:00	Scoring by quarter: 16–27, 25–19, 22–15, 20–22, Overtime: 10–12
	Pts: De Colo 18; Rebs: Clyburn 6 Asts: De Colo 6 PIR: Hines 27	Boxscore	Pts: Veselý 31; Rebs: Thompson 12; Asts: Sloukas, Wanamaker 9 PIR: Veselý 30	Arena: Megasport Arena; Attendance: 11,213; Referees: Saša Pukl (SLO), Robert Lottermoser (GER), Oļegs Latiševs (LAT)

17 November 2017	Olympiacos (Greece)	85–59	(Serbia) Crvena zvezda mts	Piraeus
20:00	Scoring by quarter: 22–13, 25–24, 20–12, 18–10
	Pts: Thompson 14; Rebs: Milutinov 12; Asts: Strēlnieks 5 PIR: Milutinov 22	Boxscore	Pts: Rochestie 20; Rebs: Rochestie 6 Asts: Radičević 5 PIR: Rochestie 17	Arena: Peace and Friendship Stadium; Attendance: 7,841; Referees: Miguel Pérez Pérez (ESP), Jakub Zamojski (POL), Michele Rossi (ITA)

17 November 2017	AX Armani Exchange Olimpia (Italy)	71–62	(Germany) Brose Bamberg	Assago
20:45	Scoring by quarter: 13–16, 14–19, 16–16, 28–11
	Pts: Jerrells, Tarczewski 12; Rebs: Gudaitis 8 Asts: Jerrells, Theodore 4 PIR: Tarczewski 19	Boxscore	Pts: Wright 12; Rebs: three players 6 Asts: Hickman, Lô 3 PIR: Rubit 15	Arena: Mediolanum Forum; Attendance: 7,838; Referees: Borys Ryzhyk (UKR), Emilio Pérez Pizarro (ESP), Ingus Baumanis (LAT)

17 November 2017	FC Barcelona Lassa (Spain)	89–71	(Spain) Valencia Basket	Barcelona
21:00	Scoring by quarter: 24–18, 26–14, 21–24, 18–15
	Pts: Oriola 14; Rebs: Ribas 5 Asts: Hanga, Heurtel 5 PIR: Moerman 17	Boxscore	Pts: Pleiß 13; Rebs: Pleiß 7 Asts: Vives 7 PIR: Vives 15	Arena: Palau Blaugrana; Attendance: 5,089; Referees: Ilija Belošević (SRB), Elias Koromilas (GRE), Marko Juras (SRB)

=== Round 9 ===
23 November 2017	Žalgiris (Lithuania)	91–83	(Turkey) Anadolu Efes	Kaunas
19:00	Scoring by quarter: 22–26, 25–18, 19–17, 25–22
	Pts: Ulanovas 22; Rebs: Ulanovas 7 Asts: Pangos 7 PIR: Ulanovas 32	Boxscore	Pts: Dunston 17; Rebs: three players 6 Asts: Simon 5 PIR: Dunston 25	Arena: Žalgirio Arena; Attendance: 10,195; Referees: Miguel Pérez Pérez (ESP), Fernando Rocha (POR), Aare Halliko (EST)

23 November 2017	Brose Bamberg (Germany)	83–82	(Spain) Valencia Basket	Bamberg
20:00	Scoring by quarter: 20–23, 21–24, 11–19, 31–16
	Pts: Hickman 26; Rebs: Rubit 8 Asts: Hackett, Hickman 4 PIR: Hickman 28	Boxscore	Pts: Green 17; Rebs: Pleiß 7 Asts: San Emeterio 4 PIR: Thomas 19	Arena: Brose Arena; Attendance: 6,150; Referees: Sreten Radović (CRO), Mario Majkič (SLO), Uroš Obrknežević (SRB)

23 November 2017	AX Armani Exchange Olimpia (Italy)	85–86	(Greece) Olympiacos	Assago
20:45	Scoring by quarter: 21–17, 21–29, 20–20, 23–20
	Pts: Gudaitis 19; Rebs: Gudaitis, Tarczewski 10; Asts: Micov 5 PIR: Gudaitis 28	Boxscore	Pts: McLean 22; Rebs: McLean 7 Asts: Strēlnieks 5 PIR: McLean 25	Arena: Mediolanum Forum; Attendance: 7,827; Referees: Daniel Hierrezuelo (ESP), Damir Javor (SLO), Anne Panther (GER)

23 November 2017	FC Barcelona Lassa (Spain)	89–67	(Israel) Maccabi Tel Aviv	Barcelona
21:00	Scoring by quarter: 22–11, 22–13, 22–20, 23–23
	Pts: Koponen 20; Rebs: Séraphin 11; Asts: Heurtel 7 PIR: Koponen, Sanders 19	Boxscore	Pts: Kane 13; Rebs: Kane, Tyus 7 Asts: Jackson, Roll 4 PIR: Kane 22	Arena: Palau Blaugrana; Attendance: 5,034; Referees: Saša Pukl (SLO), Piotr Pastusiak (POL), Spiros Gkontas (GRE)

23 November 2017	Crvena zvezda mts (Serbia)	81–85	(Spain) Kirolbet Baskonia	Belgrade
21:00	Scoring by quarter: 17–22, 21–25, 19–17, 24–21
	Pts: Lessort 19; Rebs: Bjelica 6 Asts: Feldeine 6 PIR: Lessort 18	Boxscore	Pts: Voigtmann 17; Rebs: Voigtmann 8 Asts: Voigtmann 5 PIR: Shengelia 23	Arena: Kombank Arena; Attendance: 5,467; Referees: Carmelo Paternicò (ITA), Elias Koromilas (GRE), Sérgio Silva (POR)

24 November 2017	Fenerbahçe Doğuş (Turkey)	71–67	(Russia) Khimki	Istanbul
18:45	Scoring by quarter: 24–15, 14–11, 20–22, 13–19
	Pts: Nunnally 20; Rebs: Datome 7 Asts: Wanamaker 6 PIR: Nunnally 27	Boxscore	Pts: Shved 21; Rebs: Robinson 5 Asts: Shved 5 PIR: Shved 20	Arena: Ülker Sports Arena; Attendance: 11,508; Referees: Christos Christodoulou (GRE), Ilija Belošević (SRB), Juan Carlos García González (ESP)

24 November 2017	Panathinaikos Superfoods (Greece)	82–80	(Spain) Real Madrid	Athens
20:00	Scoring by quarter: 23–28, 17–26, 24–15, 18–11
	Pts: Rivers 20; Rebs: Gist 7 Asts: Calathes 8 PIR: Gist 18	Boxscore	Pts: Dončić 19; Rebs: Reyes 8 Asts: Fernández 4 PIR: Fernández 19	Arena: Olympic Indoor Hall; Attendance: 16,231; Referees: Luigi Lamonica (ITA), Oļegs Latiševs (LAT), Milan Nedović (SLO)

24 November 2017	Unicaja (Spain)	80–89	(Russia) CSKA Moscow	Málaga
20:45	Scoring by quarter: 16–27, 23–19, 26–17, 15–26
	Pts: Augustine 18; Rebs: Augustine 9 Asts: Díaz, McCallum Jr. 4 PIR: Augustine 26	Boxscore	Pts: Rodríguez 21; Rebs: Hines 8 Asts: three players 4 PIR: Rodríguez 22	Arena: Palacio de Deportes José María Martín Carpena; Attendance: 7,893; Referees: Milivoje Jovčić (SRB), Matej Boltauzer (SLO), Petros Papapetrou (GRE)

=== Round 10 ===
30 November 2017	Khimki (Russia)	82–73	(Germany) Brose Bamberg	Mytishchi
18:00	Scoring by quarter: 23–21, 19–19, 20–16, 20–17
	Pts: Shved 26; Rebs: three players 5 Asts: Shved 5 PIR: Shved 25	Boxscore	Pts: Hickman 21; Rebs: Taylor 6 Asts: Zisis 6 PIR: Hickman, Wright 17	Arena: Mytishchi Arena; Attendance: 5,351; Referees: Daniel Hierrezuelo (ESP), Oļegs Latiševs (LAT), Artūras Šukys (LTU)

30 November 2017	Anadolu Efes (Turkey)	73–68	(Italy) AX Armani Exchange Olimpia	Istanbul
18:30	Scoring by quarter: 23–16, 10–14, 19–20, 21–18
	Pts: Štimac 19; Rebs: Štimac 10; Asts: Motum 4 PIR: Štimac 29	Boxscore	Pts: Micov, Theodore 15; Rebs: Tarczewski 8 Asts: Micov 5 PIR: Micov 17	Arena: Sinan Erdem Dome; Attendance: 4,092; Referees: Saša Pukl (SLO), Benjamín Jiménez (ESP), Igor Dragojević (MNE)

30 November 2017	Maccabi Tel Aviv (Israel)	81–74	(Lithuania) Žalgiris	Tel Aviv
20:05	Scoring by quarter: 15–14, 24–15, 26–22, 16–23
	Pts: Cole 26; Rebs: Bolden 10; Asts: Jackson 6 PIR: Cole 26	Boxscore	Pts: Milaknis 19; Rebs: Jankūnas, White 6 Asts: Pangos 6 PIR: Jankūnas 18	Arena: Menora Mivtachim Arena; Attendance: 10,728; Referees: Juan Carlos García González (ESP), Elias Koromilas (GRE), Mario Majkič (SLO)

30 November 2017	Kirolbet Baskonia (Spain)	69–83	(Turkey) Fenerbahçe Doğuş	Vitoria-Gasteiz
20:30	Scoring by quarter: 25–15, 12–26, 14–25, 18–17
	Pts: Shengelia 13; Rebs: Voigtmann 6 Asts: Granger 6 PIR: Timma 16	Boxscore	Pts: Nunnally 16; Rebs: Wanamaker 6 Asts: Sloukas, Veselý 6 PIR: Veselý 22	Arena: Fernando Buesa Arena; Attendance: 11,213; Referees: Luigi Lamonica (ITA), Sreten Radović (CRO), Matej Boltauzer (SLO)

30 November 2017	Valencia Basket (Spain)	64–72	(Greece) Olympiacos	Valencia
20:30	Scoring by quarter: 13–20, 17–15, 15–19, 19–18
	Pts: Green 26; Rebs: Pleiß 8 Asts: Vives 5 PIR: Pleiß 23	Boxscore	Pts: Papanikolaou 13; Rebs: Printezis 14; Asts: Papanikolaou, Papapetrou 4 PIR: Papanikolaou 16	Arena: Fuente de San Luis; Attendance: 7,084; Referees: Milivoje Jovčić (SRB), Fernando Rocha (POR), Tomasz Trawicki (POL)

1 December 2017	CSKA Moscow (Russia)	92–78	(Spain) FC Barcelona Lassa	Moscow
18:00	Scoring by quarter: 24–24, 20–15, 22–19, 26–20
	Pts: Clyburn 22; Rebs: Hines 6 Asts: De Colo 11; PIR: De Colo 30	Boxscore	Pts: Séraphin, Heurtel 11; Rebs: Oriola 7 Asts: Heurtel 5 PIR: Séraphin 15	Arena: Megasport Arena; Attendance: 12,008; Referees: Damir Javor (SLO), Emin Moğulkoç (TUR), Michele Rossi (ITA)

1 December 2017	Panathinaikos Superfoods (Greece)	82–71	(Spain) Unicaja	Athens
20:00	Scoring by quarter: 16–15, 16–20, 22–19, 28–17
	Pts: Gist 17; Rebs: Gist 11; Asts: Calathes 12; PIR: Gist 30	Boxscore	Pts: Nedović 16; Rebs: Augustine 6 Asts: A. Díaz, Nedović 4 PIR: Suárez 19	Arena: Olympic Indoor Hall; Attendance: 11,797; Referees: Borys Ryzhyk (UKR), Tomislav Hordov (CRO), Jakub Zamojski (POL)

1 December 2017	Real Madrid (Spain)	83–87	(Serbia) Crvena zvezda mts	Madrid
21:00	Scoring by quarter: 24–19, 15–27, 19–21, 25–20
	Pts: Dončić 20; Rebs: Reyes 8 Asts: Fernández, Dončić 5 PIR: Dončić 32	Boxscore	Pts: Rochestie 18; Rebs: Bjelica 6 Asts: Rochestie 7 PIR: Rochestie 18	Arena: WiZink Center; Attendance: 9,239; Referees: Christos Christodoulou (GRE), Robert Lottermoser (GER), Piotr Pastusiak (POL)

=== Round 11 ===
7 December 2017	Žalgiris (Lithuania)	80–74	(Greece) Panathinaikos Superfoods	Kaunas
19:00	Scoring by quarter: 10–20, 21–13, 33–14, 16–27
	Pts: Jankūnas 17; Rebs: Ulanovas 11; Asts: Pangos 11; PIR: Ulanovas 19	Boxscore	Pts: Pappas 16; Rebs: Calathes, Gabriel 6 Asts: Lekavičius 5 PIR: Pappas 13	Arena: Žalgirio Arena; Attendance: 12,380; Referees: Sreten Radović (CRO), Carmelo Paternicò (ITA), David Romano (ISR)

7 December 2017	Brose Bamberg (Germany)	76–92	(Russia) CSKA Moscow	Bamberg
20:00	Scoring by quarter: 20–22, 19–20, 20–28, 17–22
	Pts: Rubit 16; Rebs: Wright 5 Asts: Hackett 5 PIR: Rubit 18	Boxscore	Pts: De Colo 20; Rebs: Clyburn 9 Asts: Rodríguez 7 PIR: De Colo 24	Arena: Brose Arena; Attendance: 5,396; Referees: Borys Ryzhyk (UKR), Carlos Peruga (ESP), Rain Peerandi (EST)

7 December 2017	Maccabi Tel Aviv (Israel)	94–91	(Spain) Valencia Basket	Tel Aviv
20:05	Scoring by quarter: 25–21, 21–25, 23–19, 25–26
	Pts: Jackson 21; Rebs: Tyus 8 Asts: Roll 6 PIR: Jackson 20	Boxscore	Pts: Green 24; Rebs: Pleiß 7 Asts: Green 7 PIR: Green 28	Arena: Menora Mivtachim Arena; Attendance: 10,728; Referees: Luigi Lamonica (ITA), Oļegs Latiševs (LAT), Saulius Racys (SWE)

7 December 2017	Kirolbet Baskonia (Spain)	88–82	(Spain) Unicaja	Vitoria-Gasteiz
20:30	Scoring by quarter: 27–12, 14–24, 18–20, 29–26
	Pts: Timma 24; Rebs: Shengelia 6 Asts: Voigtmann 6 PIR: Timma 21	Boxscore	Pts: Waczyński 25; Rebs: Augustine 6 Asts: Nedović 8 PIR: Waczyński 22	Arena: Fernando Buesa Arena; Attendance: 10,346; Referees: Damir Javor (SLO), Petri Mäntylä (FIN), Jurgis Laurinavičius (LTU)

7 December 2017	AX Armani Exchange Olimpia (Italy)	71–77	(Russia) Khimki	Assago
20:45	Scoring by quarter: 24–12, 14–19, 18–24, 15–22
	Pts: Jerrells 17; Rebs: Tarczewski 5 Asts: Theodore 8 PIR: Theodore 22	Boxscore	Pts: Shved 29; Rebs: Honeycutt 7 Asts: Shved 4 PIR: Shved 35	Arena: Mediolanum Forum; Attendance: 8,209; Referees: Matej Boltauzer (SLO), Emilio Pérez Pizarro (ESP), Tomislav Hordov (CRO)

8 December 2017	Crvena zvezda mts (Serbia)	100–81	(Turkey) Anadolu Efes	Belgrade
19:00	Scoring by quarter: 29–23, 21–21, 24–18, 26–19
	Pts: Feldeine 29; Rebs: Lessort 9 Asts: Rochestie 6 PIR: Feldeine 32	Boxscore	Pts: Dunston 16; Rebs: Štimac 8 Asts: three players 4 PIR: Dragić 19	Arena: Aleksandar Nikolić Hall; Attendance: 6,123; Referees: Juan Carlos García González (ESP), Ioannis Foufis (GRE), Robert Vyklický (CZE)

8 December 2017	Olympiacos (Greece)	92–83(OT)	(Spain) Real Madrid	Piraeus
20:00	Scoring by quarter: 18–8, 16–22, 22–17, 16–25, Overtime: 20–11
	Pts: Printezis 21; Rebs: Papanikolaou 8 Asts: Spanoulis 4 PIR: Printezis 27	Boxscore	Pts: Dončić 33; Rebs: Thompkins 10; Asts: Dončić 4 PIR: Dončić 36	Arena: Peace and Friendship Stadium; Attendance: 11,501; Referees: Saša Pukl (SLO), Ilija Belošević (SRB), Emin Moğulkoç (TUR)

8 December 2017	FC Barcelona Lassa (Spain)	68–83	(Turkey) Fenerbahçe Doğuş	Barcelona
21:00	Scoring by quarter: 28–22, 10–17, 13–25, 17–19
	Pts: Hanga 15; Rebs: Séraphin 9 Asts: Heurtel 10; PIR: Hanga 18	Boxscore	Pts: Sloukas 17; Rebs: Datome 9 Asts: Sloukas 5 PIR: Sloukas 17	Arena: Palau Blaugrana; Attendance: 6,437; Referees: Robert Lottermoser (GER), Elias Koromilas (GRE), Milan Nedović (SLO)

=== Round 12 ===
14 December 2017	Fenerbahçe Doğuş (Turkey)	89–90	(Lithuania) Žalgiris	Istanbul
18:45	Scoring by quarter: 24–16, 18–25, 22–22, 25–27
	Pts: Veselý 20; Rebs: Veselý 5 Asts: Nunnally 6 PIR: Veselý 29	Boxscore	Pts: Pangos 22; Rebs: Toupane 7 Asts: Pangos 7 PIR: Pangos 23	Arena: Ülker Sports Arena; Attendance: 11,031; Referees: Miguel Pérez Pérez (ESP), Piotr Pastusiak (POL), Spiros Gkontas (GRE)

14 December 2017	Brose Bamberg (Germany)	67–65	(Greece) Olympiacos	Bamberg
20:00	Scoring by quarter: 15–14, 17–26, 18–18, 17–7
	Pts: Wright 20; Rebs: Wright 7 Asts: three players 2 PIR: Wright 23	Boxscore	Pts: Printezis 12; Rebs: McLean 8 Asts: Spanoulis 4 PIR: Printezis 19	Arena: Brose Arena; Attendance: 6,150; Referees: Damir Javor (SLO), Juan Carlos García González (ESP), Joseph Bissang (FRA)

14 December 2017	Unicaja (Spain)	93–84	(Russia) Khimki	Málaga
20:00	Scoring by quarter: 27–26, 20–22, 20–18, 26–18
	Pts: Nedović 21; Rebs: Augustine 12; Asts: Nedović 7 PIR: Augustine 31	Boxscore	Pts: Shved 28; Rebs: Thomas 13; Asts: Jenkins, Thomas 5 PIR: Gill 22	Arena: Palacio de Deportes José María Martín Carpena; Attendance: 5,871; Referees: Luigi Lamonica (ITA), Saša Pukl (SLO), Nick Van den Broeck (BEL)

14 December 2017	Real Madrid (Spain)	87–75	(Spain) FC Barcelona Lassa	Madrid
20:45	Scoring by quarter: 15–15, 25–23, 28–14, 19–23
	Pts: Dončić 16; Rebs: Reyes 8 Asts: Dončić 7 PIR: Dončić 26	Boxscore	Pts: Tomić 12; Rebs: Hanga 7 Asts: Heurtel, Navarro 3 PIR: Tomić 17	Arena: WiZink Center; Attendance: 10,516; Referees: Sreten Radović (CRO), Carmelo Paternicò (ITA), Sérgio Silva (POR)

15 December 2017	CSKA Moscow (Russia)	101–86	(Israel) Maccabi Tel Aviv	Moscow
18:30	Scoring by quarter: 21–20, 28–14, 23–23, 29–29
	Pts: De Colo 26; Rebs: Hines, Kurbanov 6 Asts: Rodríguez 11; PIR: De Colo 33	Boxscore	Pts: Cole 24; Rebs: Bolden 5 Asts: Cole 7 PIR: Cole 29	Arena: Megasport Arena; Attendance: 9,044; Referees: Daniel Hierrezuelo (ESP), Milivoje Jovčić (SRB), Anne Panther (GER)

15 December 2017	Anadolu Efes (Turkey)	81–82	(Spain) Kirolbet Baskonia	Istanbul
18:30	Scoring by quarter: 19–24, 23–21, 26–20, 13–17
	Pts: McCollum 21; Rebs: Štimac 17; Asts: Simon 8 PIR: McCollum, Štimac 16	Boxscore	Pts: Shengelia 17; Rebs: Poirier 12; Asts: Granger 9 PIR: Poirier 35	Arena: Sinan Erdem Dome; Attendance: 3,536; Referees: Robert Lottermoser (GER), Oļegs Latiševs (LAT), Josip Radojković (CRO)

15 December 2017	Panathinaikos Superfoods (Greece)	80–72	(Italy) AX Armani Exchange Olimpia	Athens
20:15	Scoring by quarter: 14–23, 25–18, 25–16, 16–15
	Pts: Rivers 20; Rebs: Gist 7 Asts: Calathes 12; PIR: Gist 18	Boxscore	Pts: Micov 13; Rebs: Cinciarini 4 Asts: Goudelock 4 PIR: Gudaitis 18	Arena: Olympic Indoor Hall; Attendance: 8,863; Referees: Ilija Belošević (SRB), Fernando Rocha (POR), Carlos Cortés (ESP)

15 December 2017	Valencia Basket (Spain)	82–86	(Serbia) Crvena zvezda mts	Valencia
20:30	Scoring by quarter: 22–26, 16–14, 25–16, 19–30
	Pts: San Emeterio 17; Rebs: Dubljević 10; Asts: Vives 5 PIR: Pleiß, San Emeterio 15	Boxscore	Pts: Feldeine 26; Rebs: Bjelica 9 Asts: Feldeine 5 PIR: Feldeine 31	Arena: Fuente de San Luis; Attendance: 6,715; Referees: Borys Ryzhyk (UKR), Jakub Zamojski (POL), Elias Koromilas (GRE)

=== Round 13 ===
19 December 2017	Fenerbahçe Doğuş (Turkey)	82–56	(Serbia) Crvena zvezda mts	Istanbul
18:45	Scoring by quarter: 17–11, 24–22, 21–9, 20–14
	Pts: Veselý 15; Rebs: Veselý 8 Asts: Sloukas 8 PIR: Veselý 24	Boxscore	Pts: Dobrić 15; Rebs: Lessort 9 Asts: Dangubić 4 PIR: Dobrić 17	Arena: Ülker Sports Arena; Attendance: 10,439; Referees: Christos Christodoulou (GRE), Fernando Rocha (POR), Michele Rossi (ITA)

19 December 2017	Žalgiris (Lithuania)	88–84	(Germany) Brose Bamberg	Kaunas
19:00	Scoring by quarter: 21–22, 29–27, 22–23, 16–12
	Pts: Milaknis 20; Rebs: Jankūnas 5 Asts: Pangos 6 PIR: Jankūnas 22	Boxscore	Pts: Wright 22; Rebs: Wright 5 Asts: Zisis 9 PIR: Wright 21	Arena: Žalgirio Arena; Attendance: 11,180; Referees: Elias Koromilas (GRE), Milija Vojinović (SRB), Milan Nedović (SLO)

19 December 2017	Panathinaikos Superfoods (Greece)	89–76	(Israel) Maccabi Tel Aviv	Athens
20:15	Scoring by quarter: 25–21, 24–22, 18–13, 22–20
	Pts: Gist, Rivers 15; Rebs: Gist, Singleton 10; Asts: Gist, Lekavičius 4 PIR: Singleton 23	Boxscore	Pts: Cole 14; Rebs: Thomas 8 Asts: Jackson 6 PIR: Jackson 18	Arena: Olympic Indoor Hall; Attendance: 11,472; Referees: Robert Lottermoser (GER), Borys Ryzhyk (UKR), Benjamín Jiménez (ESP)

19 December 2017	Real Madrid (Spain)	91–72	(Spain) Valencia Basket	Madrid
20:45	Scoring by quarter: 24–18, 19–23, 21–17, 27–14
	Pts: Campazzo 14; Rebs: Thompkins 11; Asts: Campazzo 8 PIR: Campazzo 23	Boxscore	Pts: Dubljević 18; Rebs: Doornekamp, San Emeterio 4 Asts: Van Rossom 4 PIR: Dubljević 18	Arena: WiZink Center; Attendance: 9,098; Referees: Damir Javor (SLO), Tomislav Hordov (CRO), Renaud Geller (BEL)

20 December 2017	Khimki (Russia)	86–68	(Turkey) Anadolu Efes	Mytishchi
18:00	Scoring by quarter: 26–19, 11–14 , 20–23, 29–12
	Pts: Shved 25; Rebs: Gill, Honeycutt 6 Asts: Shved 6 PIR: Shved 30	Boxscore	Pts: McCollum 20; Rebs: three players 8 Asts: McCollum, Simon 3 PIR: Dunston 22	Arena: Mytishchi Arena; Attendance: 5,211; Referees: Daniel Hierrezuelo (ESP), Piotr Pastusiak (POL), Amit Balak (ISR)

20 December 2017	Olympiacos (Greece)	88–86	(Russia) CSKA Moscow	Piraeus
20:00	Scoring by quarter: 23–20, 22–28, 19–20, 24–18
	Pts: McLean 25; Rebs: McLean 12; Asts: Spanoulis 8 PIR: McLean 30	Boxscore	Pts: Rodríguez 23; Rebs: Clyburn 10; Asts: De Colo 3 PIR: De Colo 21	Arena: Peace and Friendship Stadium; Attendance: 11,318; Referees: Sreten Radović (CRO), Oļegs Latiševs (LAT), Emilio Pérez Pizarro (ESP)

20 December 2017	AX Armani Exchange Olimpia (Italy)	92–85	(Spain) Kirolbet Baskonia	Assago
20:45	Scoring by quarter: 27–25, 22–12, 27–21, 16–27
	Pts: Goudelock, Jerrells 15; Rebs: Gudaitis 8 Asts: Jerrells 7 PIR: Jerrells 25	Boxscore	Pts: Shengelia 19; Rebs: Poirier 6 Asts: Vildoza 4 PIR: Shengelia 26	Arena: Mediolanum Forum; Attendance: 6,203; Referees: Saša Pukl (SLO), Jakub Zamojski (POL), Robert Vyklický (CZE)

20 December 2017	FC Barcelona Lassa (Spain)	83–90	(Spain) Unicaja	Barcelona
21:00	Scoring by quarter: 24–26, 21–18, 19–22, 19–24
	Pts: Heurtel 19; Rebs: Séraphin 10; Asts: Heurtel 9 PIR: Heurtel 24	Boxscore	Pts: Nedović 26; Rebs: Augustine 14; Asts: three players 4 PIR: Augustine 27	Arena: Palau Blaugrana; Attendance: 5,483; Referees: Ilija Belošević (SRB), Emin Moğulkoç (TUR), Mario Majkič (SLO)

=== Round 14 ===
21 December 2017	Crvena zvezda mts (Serbia)	63–69	(Greece) Panathinaikos Superfoods	Belgrade
19:00	Scoring by quarter: 15–20, 23–21, 11–17, 14–11
	Pts: Feldeine 21; Rebs: Dangubić 6 Asts: Rochestie 5 PIR: Lessort 13	Boxscore	Pts: Denmon, Gist 16; Rebs: Lojeski, Singleton 6 Asts: Lekavičius, Pappas 4 PIR: Gist 18	Arena: Aleksandar Nikolić Hall; Attendance: 5,978; Referees: Miguel Pérez Pérez (ESP), Petri Mäntylä (FIN), Seffi Shemmesh (ISR)

21 December 2017	Brose Bamberg (Germany)	66–81	(Spain) Real Madrid	Bamberg
20:00	Scoring by quarter: 13–29, 22–21, 16–18, 15–13
	Pts: Hackett 13; Rebs: Wright 8 Asts: Lô 4 PIR: Lô 14	Boxscore	Pts: Thompkins 20; Rebs: Tavares 10; Asts: Dončić 8 PIR: Thompkins 22	Arena: Brose Arena; Attendance: 6,150; Referees: Christos Christodoulou (GRE), Borys Ryzhyk (UKR), Rain Peerandi (EST)

21 December 2017	Maccabi Tel Aviv (Israel)	82–73	(Turkey) Fenerbahçe Doğuş	Tel Aviv
20:05	Scoring by quarter: 24–15, 16–21, 20–18, 22–19
	Pts: Jackson 20; Rebs: Bolden 9 Asts: Bolden, Jackson 5 PIR: Jackson 22	Boxscore	Pts: Veselý 18; Rebs: Melli 8 Asts: Muhammed 5 PIR: Veselý 27	Arena: Menora Mivtachim Arena; Attendance: 10,728; Referees: Damir Javor (SLO), Carlos Peruga (ESP), Joseph Bissang (FRA)

21 December 2017	Valencia Basket (Spain)	63–71	(Lithuania) Žalgiris	Valencia
20:45	Scoring by quarter: 16–19, 20–15, 10–20, 17–17
	Pts: Green 14; Rebs: Dubljević 10; Asts: San Emeterio 5 PIR: Dubljević 21	Boxscore	Pts: Micić 16; Rebs: Jankūnas 11; Asts: Micić 5 PIR: Ulanovas 18	Arena: Fuente de San Luis; Attendance: 6,437; Referees: Robert Lottermoser (GER), Milivoje Jovčić (SRB), Igor Dragojević (MNE)

22 December 2017	CSKA Moscow (Russia)	79–68	(Russia) Khimki	Moscow
18:00	Scoring by quarter: 23–16, 20–17, 14–22, 22–13
	Pts: Higgins 26; Rebs: Kurbanov 7 Asts: Kurbanov 4 PIR: Higgins 31	Boxscore	Pts: Shved 16; Rebs: Gill 6 Asts: Honeycutt 4 PIR: Honeycutt 17	Arena: Universal Sports Hall CSKA; Attendance: 4,920; Referees: Juan Carlos García González (ESP), Carmelo Paternicò (ITA), Uroš Obrknežević (SRB)

22 December 2017	Anadolu Efes (Turkey)	58–61	(Greece) Olympiacos	Istanbul
18:30	Scoring by quarter: 9–17, 16–16, 14–12, 19–16
	Pts: Simon 17; Rebs: Simon 7 Asts: McCollum 4 PIR: McCollum 23	Boxscore	Pts: Spanoulis 12; Rebs: McLean 7 Asts: Spanoulis 4 PIR: McLean 20	Arena: Sinan Erdem Dome; Attendance: 5,650; Referees: Saša Pukl (SLO), Fernando Rocha (POR), Mehdi Difallah (FRA)

22 December 2017	Kirolbet Baskonia (Spain)	85–82	(Spain) FC Barcelona Lassa	Vitoria-Gasteiz
20:30	Scoring by quarter: 22–17, 30–18, 22–22, 11–25
	Pts: Shengelia 24; Rebs: Shengelia 6 Asts: Huertas 10; PIR: Shengelia 31	Boxscore	Pts: Ribas 15; Rebs: Oriola, Tomić 5 Asts: Navarro 7 PIR: Ribas 21	Arena: Fernando Buesa Arena; Attendance: 12,467; Referees: Luigi Lamonica (ITA), Piotr Pastusiak (POL), Spiros Gkontas (GRE)

22 December 2017	Unicaja (Spain)	74–71	(Italy) AX Armani Exchange Olimpia	Málaga
20:45	Scoring by quarter: 26–20, 9–22, 20–11, 19–18
	Pts: Brooks, Nedović 15; Rebs: Brooks 11; Asts: McCallum 4 PIR: Brooks 26	Boxscore	Pts: Goudelock 18; Rebs: Tarczewski 7 Asts: Theodore 5 PIR: Theodore 18	Arena: Palacio de Deportes José María Martín Carpena; Attendance: 6,260; Referees: Oļegs Latiševs (LAT), Elias Koromilas (GRE), Tomislav Hordov (CRO)

=== Round 15 ===
28 December 2017	Fenerbahçe Doğuş (Turkey)	77–79	(Spain) Real Madrid	Istanbul
18:45	Scoring by quarter: 17–10, 19–27, 25–25, 16–17
	Pts: Wanamaker 20; Rebs: Melli 7 Asts: Sloukas, Nunnally 3 PIR: Wanamaker 23	Boxscore	Pts: Dončić 20; Rebs: Dončić 8 Asts: Dončić 10; PIR: Dončić 37	Arena: Ülker Sports Arena; Attendance: 12,918; Referees: Robert Lottermoser (GER), Elias Koromilas (GRE), Carmelo Paternico (ITA)

28 December 2017	Žalgiris (Lithuania)	74–68	(Greece) Olympiacos	Kaunas
19:00	Scoring by quarter: 22–19, 14–19, 12–15, 26–15
	Pts: Pangos, Milaknis 14; Rebs: Jankūnas 5 Asts: Pangos 7 PIR: Pangos 17	Boxscore	Pts: Papapetrou 13; Rebs: Thompson 8 Asts: Spanoulis 7 PIR: McLean 17	Arena: Žalgirio Arena; Attendance: 15,480; Referees: Daniel Hierrezuelo (ESP), Damir Javor (SLO), Sérgio Silva (POR)

28 December 2017	Maccabi Tel Aviv (Israel)	78–89	(Spain) Unicaja	Tel Aviv
20:05	Scoring by quarter: 22–19, 25–20, 11–22, 20–28
	Pts: Cole 16; Rebs: Bolden 10; Asts: Jackson 5 PIR: Bolden 18	Boxscore	Pts: Nedović 20; Rebs: Shermadini 9 Asts: McCallum Jr., Nedović 6 PIR: Shermadini 26	Arena: Menora Mivtachim Arena; Attendance: 10,728; Referees: Christos Christodoulou (GRE), Milivoje Jovčić (SRB), Artūras Šukys (LTU)

28 December 2017	Valencia Basket (Spain)	67–63	(Greece) Panathinaikos Superfoods	Valencia
21:00	Scoring by quarter: 12–17, 20–15, 16–16, 19–15
	Pts: Green 21; Rebs: Doornekamp 7 Asts: Van Rossom 4 PIR: Green 26	Boxscore	Pts: Lojeski 17; Rebs: Singleton 13; Asts: Singleton 3 PIR: Singleton 25	Arena: Fuente de San Luis; Attendance: 6,900; Referees: Luigi Lamonica (ITA), Fernando Rocha (POR), David Romano (ISR)

29 December 2017	Khimki (Russia)	65–79	(Spain) FC Barcelona Lassa	Mytishchi
18:00	Scoring by quarter: 15–25, 17–11, 25–21, 8–22
	Pts: Shved 22; Rebs: Gill 5 Asts: Monia 5 PIR: Honeycutt 18	Boxscore	Pts: three players 12; Rebs: Tomić 8 Asts: Ribas 8 PIR: Tomić 22	Arena: Mytishchi Arena; Attendance: 6,627; Referees: Saša Pukl (SLO), Borys Ryzhyk (UKR), Rain Peerandi (EST)

29 December 2017	Anadolu Efes (Turkey)	69–58	(Germany) Brose Bamberg	Istanbul
18:30	Scoring by quarter: 15–18, 14–20, 15–10, 25–10
	Pts: Brown 21; Rebs: Dunston 13; Asts: Dragić 5 PIR: Brown 29	Boxscore	Pts: Hickman 10; Rebs: Musli 9 Asts: Hackett 7 PIR: Hackett 16	Arena: Sinan Erdem Dome; Attendance: 2,514; Referees: Juan Carlos García González (ESP), Oļegs Latiševs (LAT), Aare Halliko (EST)

29 December 2017	Kirolbet Baskonia (Spain)	81–90	(Russia) CSKA Moscow	Vitoria-Gasteiz
20:30	Scoring by quarter: 26–18, 22–33, 24–19, 9–20
	Pts: Shengelia 20; Rebs: Shengelia 13; Asts: Beaubois, Granger 3 PIR: Shengelia 33	Boxscore	Pts: Rodríguez 25; Rebs: Rodríguez, Clyburn 6 Asts: Rodríguez 8 PIR: Rodríguez 35	Arena: Fernando Buesa Arena; Attendance: 14,923; Referees: Ilija Belošević (SRB), Matej Boltauzer (SLO), Anne Panther (GER)

29 December 2017	AX Armani Exchange Olimpia (Italy)	88–91	(Serbia) Crvena zvezda mts	Assago
20:45	Scoring by quarter: 15–29, 25–16, 20–16, 28–30
	Pts: Micov 16; Rebs: Gudaitis 8 Asts: Cinciarini 5 PIR: Cinciarini 20	Boxscore	Pts: Feldeine 19; Rebs: Bjelica 7 Asts: Antić 5 PIR: Bjelica 28	Arena: Mediolanum Forum; Attendance: 8,667; Referees: Carlos Peruga (ESP), Piotr Pastusiak (POL), Ioannis Foufis (GRE)

=== Round 16 ===
4 January 2018	Panathinaikos Superfoods (Greece)	90–79	(Turkey) Anadolu Efes	Athens
20:15	Scoring by quarter: 23–12, 24–21, 23–23, 20–23
	Pts: Calathes 17; Rebs: Gist 5 Asts: Calathes 9 PIR: Calathes 25	Boxscore	Pts: Adams 20; Rebs: Dunston 8 Asts: Štimac 4 PIR: Dunston 20	Arena: Olympic Indoor Hall; Attendance: 12,505; Referees: Robert Lottermoser (GER), Borys Ryzhyk (UKR), Milivoje Jovčić (SRB)

4 January 2018	Unicaja (Spain)	83–85	(Spain) Valencia Basket	Málaga
20:45	Scoring by quarter: 19–19, 29–20, 21–26, 14–20
	Pts: Nedović 23; Rebs: McCallum Jr., Brooks 4 Asts: McCallum Jr. 7 PIR: Nedović 20	Boxscore	Pts: Martínez 17; Rebs: Pleiß 8 Asts: Van Rossom 7 PIR: Pleiß 21	Arena: Palacio de Deportes José María Martín Carpena; Attendance: 8,338; Referees: Damir Javor (SLO), Carmelo Paternico (ITA), Anne Panther (GER)

4 January 2018	FC Barcelona Lassa (Spain)	85–72	(Russia) CSKA Moscow	Barcelona
21:00	Scoring by quarter: 25–17, 22–25, 19–13, 19–17
	Pts: Koponen 13; Rebs: Tomić, Moerman 7 Asts: Heurtel 8 PIR: Hanga 13	Boxscore	Pts: De Colo 23; Rebs: De Colo, Hines 6 Asts: Rodríguez 4 PIR: De Colo 31	Arena: Palau Blaugrana; Attendance: 6,609; Referees: Christos Christodoulou (GRE), Fernando Rocha (POR), Mario Majkić (SLO)

5 January 2018	Fenerbahçe Doğuş (Turkey)	79–74	(Spain) Kirolbet Baskonia	Istanbul
18:45	Scoring by quarter: 18–22, 18–16, 27–21, 16–15
	Pts: Gudurić 18; Rebs: Thompson 10; Asts: three players 4 PIR: Wanamaker 24	Boxscore	Pts: Shengelia 15; Rebs: Poirier, Shengelia 6 Asts: Granger 5 PIR: Shengelia 22	Arena: Ülker Sports Arena; Attendance: 11,392; Referees: Saša Pukl (SLO), Sreten Radović (CRO), Jakub Zamojski (POL)

5 January 2018	Crvena zvezda mts (Serbia)	77–65	(Lithuania) Žalgiris	Belgrade
19:00	Scoring by quarter: 16–18, 17–13, 15–14, 29–20
	Pts: Rochestie 16; Rebs: Lessort 9 Asts: Rochestie 10; PIR: Rochestie 26	Boxscore	Pts: Pangos 19; Rebs: Pangos 7 Asts: Pangos 3 PIR: Pangos 19	Arena: Aleksandar Nikolić Hall; Attendance: 6,123; Referees: Luigi Lamonica (ITA), Emilio Pérez Pizarro (ESP), Marcin Kowalski (POL)

5 January 2018	Brose Bamberg (Germany)	70–74	(Russia) Khimki	Bamberg
20:00	Scoring by quarter: 26–26, 16–14, 16–16, 12–18
	Pts: Wright 20; Rebs: Wright 10; Asts: Hackett 6 PIR: Wright 19	Boxscore	Pts: Shved 28; Rebs: Thomas 7 Asts: Shved 6 PIR: Thomas 28	Arena: Brose Arena; Attendance: 6,150; Referees: Daniel Hierrezuelo (ESP), Tomislav Hordov (CRO), Tomasz Trawicki (POL)

5 January 2018	Olympiacos (Greece)	87–80	(Italy) AX Armani Exchange Olimpia	Piraeus
20:00	Scoring by quarter: 26–17, 22–17, 22–19, 17–27
	Pts: Papanikolaou, Wiltjer 15; Rebs: Papanikolaou 7 Asts: Spanoulis 7 PIR: Spanoulis 22	Boxscore	Pts: Goudelock 20; Rebs: Tarczewski 6 Asts: Jerrells 4 PIR: Goudelock 17	Arena: Peace and Friendship Stadium; Attendance: 6,500; Referees: Miguel Pérez Pérez (ESP), Milija Vojinović (SRB), Sašo Petek (SLO)

5 January 2018	Real Madrid (Spain)	93–81	(Israel) Maccabi Tel Aviv	Madrid
20:45	Scoring by quarter: 25–26, 23–24, 21–10, 24–21
	Pts: Reyes 14; Rebs: Tavares 12; Asts: Causeur 6 PIR: Campazzo, Tavares 21	Boxscore	Pts: Jackson 29; Rebs: Parakhouski 8 Asts: Jackson, Roll 5 PIR: Jackson 32	Arena: WiZink Center; Attendance: 9,462; Referees: Ilija Belošević (SRB), Piotr Pastusiak (POL), Spiros Gkontas (GRE)

=== Round 17 ===
11 January 2018	Panathinaikos Superfoods (Greece)	84–75	(Spain) FC Barcelona Lassa	Athens
20:00	Scoring by quarter: 17–19, 19–15, 18–14, 30–27
	Pts: Calathes, Gist 17; Rebs: Gist 6 Asts: Calathes 12; PIR: Calathes 31	Boxscore	Pts: Heurtel 18; Rebs: Hanga, Moerman 6 Asts: Claver 4 PIR: Heurtel 17	Arena: Olympic Indoor Hall; Attendance: 17,158; Referees: Ilija Belošević (SRB), Carmelo Paternicò (ITA), Piotr Pastusiak (POL)

11 January 2018	Maccabi Tel Aviv (Israel)	90–88	(Germany) Brose Bamberg	Tel Aviv
20:05	Scoring by quarter: 20–25, 19–16, 26–23, 25–24
	Pts: Roll 23; Rebs: Bolden 10; Asts: Jackson 8 PIR: DiBartolomeo 21	Boxscore	Pts: Hickman 23; Rebs: Musli, Wright 7 Asts: Hackett, Hickman 4 PIR: Musli 29	Arena: Menora Mivtachim Arena; Attendance: 10,500; Referees: Borys Ryzhyk (UKR), Benjamín Jiménez (ESP), Joseph Bissang (FRA)

11 January 2018	AX Armani Exchange Olimpia (Italy)	81–107	(Russia) CSKA Moscow	Assago
20:45	Scoring by quarter: 15–23, 21–27, 25–27, 20–30
	Pts: Tarczewski 17; Rebs: Tarczewski 6 Asts: Cinciarini, Micov 5 PIR: Tarczewski 25	Boxscore	Pts: De Colo 24; Rebs: Clyburn 9 Asts: Rodríguez 8 PIR: Clyburn 27	Arena: Mediolanum Forum; Attendance: 7,100; Referees: Juan Carlos García González (ESP), Tomislav Hordov (CRO), David Romano (ISR)

11 January 2018	Valencia Basket (Spain)	67–80	(Turkey) Fenerbahçe Doğuş	Valencia
20:45	Scoring by quarter: 7–18, 20–15, 23–18, 17–29
	Pts: Abalde 11; Rebs: Dubljević, Pleiß 5 Asts: Van Rossom 7 PIR: Abalde 17	Boxscore	Pts: Gudurić 15; Rebs: Melli 11; Asts: Sloukas 10; PIR: Melli 20	Arena: Fuente de San Luis; Attendance: 7,216; Referees: Christos Christodoulou (GRE), Milivoje Jovčić (SRB), Michele Rossi (ITA)

12 January 2018	Khimki (Russia)	78–95	(Spain) Real Madrid	Mytishchi
18:00	Scoring by quarter: 17–26, 14–25, 18–16, 29–28
	Pts: Shved 23; Rebs: Thomas 9 Asts: Jenkins, Shved 5 PIR: Honeycutt 20	Boxscore	Pts: Fernández 16; Rebs: Tavares 8 Asts: Campazzo 7 PIR: Tavares 22	Arena: Mytishchi Arena; Attendance: 6,314; Referees: Sreten Radović (CRO), Emin Moğulkoç (TUR), Mehdi Difallah (FRA)

12 January 2018	Anadolu Efes (Turkey)	104–95	(Serbia) Crvena zvezda mts	Istanbul
18:30	Scoring by quarter: 22–21, 28–25, 27–25, 27–24
	Pts: Dragić 24; Rebs: Dunston 7 Asts: four players 4 PIR: Dragić 34	Boxscore	Pts: Bjelica 15; Rebs: Bjelica 6 Asts: Rochestie 4 PIR: Bjelica 22	Arena: Sinan Erdem Dome; Attendance: 2,682; Referees: Miguel Pérez Pérez (ESP), Spiros Gkontas (GRE), Amit Balak (ISR)

12 January 2018	Žalgiris (Lithuania)	79–77	(Spain) Unicaja	Kaunas
19:00	Scoring by quarter: 17–19, 15–21, 20–15, 27–22
	Pts: Pangos 16; Rebs: Jankūnas 9 Asts: Micić 9 PIR: Jankūnas 22	Boxscore	Pts: Waczyński 14; Rebs: Augustine 9 Asts: Nedović 9 PIR: Augustine 21	Arena: Žalgirio Arena; Attendance: 15,392; Referees: Saša Pukl (SLO), Robert Lottermoser (GER), Ioannis Foufis (GRE)

12 January 2018	Kirolbet Baskonia (Spain)	86–54	(Greece) Olympiacos	Vitoria-Gasteiz
20:30	Scoring by quarter: 16–21, 20–9, 36–14, 14–10
	Pts: Voigtmann 19; Rebs: Poirier 9 Asts: Granger 7 PIR: Voigtmann 23	Boxscore	Pts: Printezis 13; Rebs: Printezis 6 Asts: Spanoulis 8 PIR: Printezis 15	Arena: Fernando Buesa Arena; Attendance: 10,722; Referees: Luigi Lamonica (ITA), Oļegs Latiševs (LAT), Milan Nedović (SLO)

=== Round 18 ===
16 January 2018	Crvena zvezda mts (Serbia)	70–79	(Russia) Khimki	Belgrade
19:00	Scoring by quarter: 21–14, 16–17, 17–21, 16–27
	Pts: Rochestie 27; Rebs: Lessort, Rochestie 9 Asts: Rochestie 7 PIR: Rochestie 38	Boxscore	Pts: Shved 29; Rebs: Shved, Thomas 5 Asts: Marković 6 PIR: Shved 33	Arena: Aleksandar Nikolić Hall; Attendance: 5,958; Referees: Juan Carlos García González (ESP), Carmelo Paternicò (ITA), Sérgio Silva (POR)

16 January 2018	Brose Bamberg (Germany)	93–86	(Lithuania) Žalgiris	Bamberg
20:00	Scoring by quarter: 21–23, 16–21, 27–17, 29–25
	Pts: Rubit 22; Rebs: Rubit 7 Asts: Zisis 5 PIR: Rubit 29	Boxscore	Pts: White 23; Rebs: White 8 Asts: Pangos 10; PIR: White 25	Arena: Brose Arena; Attendance: 6,150; Referees: Christos Christodoulou (GRE), Carlos Peruga (ESP), Amit Balak (ISR)

16 January 2018	Olympiacos (Greece)	94–64	(Israel) Maccabi Tel Aviv	Piraeus
20:00	Scoring by quarter: 24–16, 29–24, 17–11, 24–13
	Pts: Spanoulis 13; Rebs: Bogris, Milutinov 7 Asts: Spanoulis 7 PIR: Milutinov 21	Boxscore	Pts: Jackson 13; Rebs: Thomas, Kane 6 Asts: Roll, Jackson 3 PIR: Tyus, Jackson 12	Arena: Peace and Friendship Stadium; Attendance: 8,152; Referees: Daniel Hierrezuelo (ESP), Milivoje Jovčić (SRB), Rain Peerandi (EST)

16 January 2018	Valencia Basket (Spain)	81–76	(Spain) FC Barcelona Lassa	Valencia
20:30	Scoring by quarter: 22–14, 21–22, 19–23, 19–17
	Pts: Dubljević 19; Rebs: Dubljević, Pleiß 7 Asts: Van Rossom 7 PIR: Dubljević 26	Boxscore	Pts: Oriola 15; Rebs: Moerman 8 Asts: Heurtel 10; PIR: Heurtel 26	Arena: Fuente de San Luis; Attendance: 7,375; Referees: Borys Ryzhyk (UKR), Tomislav Hordov (CRO), Sašo Petek (SLO)

17 January 2018	CSKA Moscow (Russia)	110–79	(Turkey) Anadolu Efes	Moscow
18:00	Scoring by quarter: 35–21, 23–25, 23–15, 29–18
	Pts: Higgins 21; Rebs: Clyburn 6 Asts: De Colo 7 PIR: Higgins 24	Boxscore	Pts: Motum 19; Rebs: Štimac 12; Asts: five players 2 PIR: Štimac 25	Arena: Universal Sports Hall CSKA; Attendance: 4,490; Referees: Saša Pukl (SLO), Benjamín Jiménez (ESP), Saulius Racys (SWE)

17 January 2018	Fenerbahçe Doğuş (Turkey)	67–62	(Greece) Panathinaikos Superfoods	Istanbul
18:45	Scoring by quarter: 18–20, 17–10, 12–20, 20–12
	Pts: Thompson 17; Rebs: Veselý 8 Asts: seven players 2 PIR: Thompson 18	Boxscore	Pts: Singleton 14; Rebs: Singleton 12; Asts: Calathes 7 PIR: Singleton 20	Arena: Ülker Sports Arena; Attendance: 12,597; Referees: Luigi Lamonica (ITA), Fernando Rocha (POR), Oļegs Latiševs (LAT)

17 January 2018	Real Madrid (Spain)	75–73	(Spain) Kirolbet Baskonia	Madrid
20:45	Scoring by quarter: 18–17, 16–17, 25–27, 16–12
	Pts: Causeur, Thompkins 13; Rebs: Thompkins 7 Asts: Campazzo 4 PIR: Tavares, Thompkins 20	Boxscore	Pts: Beaubois 18; Rebs: Shengelia 8 Asts: Granger 4 PIR: three players 12	Arena: WiZink Center; Attendance: 10,071; Referees: Robert Lottermoser (GER), Elias Koromilas (GRE), Artūras Šukys (LTU)

17 January 2018	AX Armani Exchange Olimpia (Italy)	101–87	(Spain) Unicaja	Assago
20:45	Scoring by quarter: 31–22, 19–22, 29–27, 22–16
	Pts: Goudelock 18; Rebs: Gudaitis 8 Asts: Theodore 11; PIR: Theodore 26	Boxscore	Pts: Nedović 22; Rebs: Augustine 7 Asts: Nedović 6 PIR: Brooks, Nedović 19	Arena: Mediolanum Forum; Attendance: 6,086; Referees: Ilija Belošević (SRB), Piotr Pastusiak (POL), Clemens Fritz (GER)

=== Round 19 ===
18 January 2018	Khimki (Russia)	82–54	(Greece) Olympiacos	Mytishchi
18:00	Scoring by quarter: 28–14, 21–11, 16–13, 17–16
	Pts: Shved 19; Rebs: Gill 8 Asts: Shved 7 PIR: Shved 19	Boxscore	Pts: Wiltjer 11; Rebs: Papapetrou, Printezis 4 Asts: Strēlnieks 4 PIR: Strēlnieks 15	Arena: Mytishchi Arena; Attendance: 5,989; Referees: Saša Pukl (SLO), Miguel Pérez Pérez (ESP), Uroš Obrknežević (SRB)

18 January 2018	Žalgiris (Lithuania)	86–82	(Spain) Valencia Basket	Kaunas
19:00	Scoring by quarter: 26–19, 21–12, 16–26, 23–25
	Pts: Toupane 18; Rebs: White 8 Asts: Pangos 15; PIR: Pangos, White 17	Boxscore	Pts: Pleiß 20; Rebs: three players 3 Asts: Van Rossom 10; PIR: Pleiß 24	Arena: Žalgirio Arena; Attendance: 12,282; Referees: Damir Javor (SLO), Emin Moğulkoç (TUR), Moritz Reiter (GER)

18 January 2018	Maccabi Tel Aviv (Israel)	89–75	(Serbia) Crvena zvezda mts	Tel Aviv
20:05	Scoring by quarter: 23–16, 24–13, 17–23, 25–23
	Pts: Jackson 22; Rebs: Bolden, Tyus 7 Asts: Cole, Jackson 5 PIR: Jackson 24	Boxscore	Pts: Bjelica 13; Rebs: Dangubić 7 Asts: Rochestie 8 PIR: Rochestie 19	Arena: Menora Mivtachim Arena; Attendance: 10,500; Referees: Christos Christodoulou (GRE), Carlos Peruga (ESP), Robert Vyklický (CZE)

18 January 2018	FC Barcelona Lassa (Spain)	81–66	(Germany) Brose Bamberg	Barcelona
21:00	Scoring by quarter: 18–15, 26–19, 15–18, 22–14
	Pts: Sanders 17; Rebs: Tomić 9 Asts: three players 3 PIR: Sanders 24	Boxscore	Pts: Lô 14; Rebs: Hackett 5 Asts: Hackett 8 PIR: Radošević 13	Arena: Palau Blaugrana; Attendance: 4,101; Referees: Sreten Radović (CRO), Elias Koromilas (GRE), Jakub Zamojski (POL)

19 January 2018	Anadolu Efes (Turkey)	84–89	(Turkey) Fenerbahçe Doğuş	Istanbul
18:30	Scoring by quarter: 24–24, 11–22, 22–22, 27–21
	Pts: Douglas 29; Rebs: Brown 6 Asts: Dragić 5 PIR: Douglas 36	Boxscore	Pts: Wanamaker 18; Rebs: Melli 7 Asts: Wanamaker 8 PIR: Wanamaker 31	Arena: Sinan Erdem Dome; Attendance: 5,009; Referees: Juan Carlos García González (ESP), Carmelo Paternicò (ITA), Anne Panther (GER)

19 January 2018	Panathinaikos Superfoods (Greece)	70–75	(Russia) CSKA Moscow	Athens
20:15	Scoring by quarter: 20–15, 9–16, 22–20, 19–24
	Pts: Pappas 14; Rebs: three players 6 Asts: Calathes 11; PIR: Calathes 22	Boxscore	Pts: Rodríguez 21; Rebs: Kurbanov 9 Asts: three players 3 PIR: Rodríguez 15	Arena: Olympic Indoor Hall; Attendance: 17,734; Referees: Daniel Hierrezuelo (ESP), Robert Lottermoser (GER), Sérgio Silva (POR)

19 January 2018	Kirolbet Baskonia (Spain)	82–83	(Italy) AX Armani Exchange Olimpia	Vitoria-Gasteiz
20:30	Scoring by quarter: 19–22, 17–25, 20–18, 26–18
	Pts: Shengelia 17; Rebs: Shengelia 12; Asts: Granger 6 PIR: Shengelia 29	Boxscore	Pts: Goudelock, Theodore 16; Rebs: Gudaitis 7 Asts: Theodore 8 PIR: Theodore 25	Arena: Fernando Buesa Arena; Attendance: 10,206; Referees: Milivoje Jovčić (SRB), Fernando Rocha (POR), Mehdi Difallah (FRA)

19 January 2018	Unicaja (Spain)	80–75	(Spain) Real Madrid	Málaga
20:45	Scoring by quarter: 20–15, 18–12, 19–25, 23–23
	Pts: McCallum, Waczyński 15; Rebs: Shermadini 7 Asts: Nedović 7 PIR: Waczyński 22	Boxscore	Pts: Dončić 16; Rebs: three players 5 Asts: Campazzo 5 PIR: Dončić 24	Arena: Palacio de Deportes José María Martín Carpena; Attendance: 10,292; Referees: Luigi Lamonica (ITA), Oļegs Latiševs (LAT), Seffi Shemmesh (ISR)

=== Round 20 ===
25 January 2018	Panathinaikos Superfoods (Greece)	94–93(OT)	(Lithuania) Žalgiris	Athens
20:15	Scoring by quarter: 29–17, 18–20, 12–21, 24–25, Overtime: 11–10
	Pts: three players 14; Rebs: Calathes, Vougioukas 8 Asts: Calathes 9 PIR: Vougioukas 19	Boxscore	Pts: Kavaliauskas 21; Rebs: White 8 Asts: Pangos 8 PIR: White 24	Arena: Olympic Indoor Hall; Attendance: 10,192; Referees: Miguel Pérez Pérez (ESP), Milivoje Jovčić (SRB), Jakub Zamojski (POL)

25 January 2018	Real Madrid (Spain)	87–68	(Turkey) Anadolu Efes	Madrid
20:45	Scoring by quarter: 20–14, 19–16, 21–17, 27–21
	Pts: Dončić 17; Rebs: Tavares 9 Asts: Fernández 8 PIR: Tavares 25	Boxscore	Pts: Dragić 18; Rebs: Dragić 5 Asts: Simon 5 PIR: Dragić 21	Arena: WiZink Center; Attendance: 8,417; Referees: Christos Christodoulou (GRE), Borys Ryzhyk (UKR), Aare Halliko (EST)

25 January 2018	Unicaja (Spain)	83–85	(Spain) Kirolbet Baskonia	Málaga
20:45	Scoring by quarter: 21–19, 22–27, 21–21, 19–18
	Pts: Nedović 19; Rebs: Augustine 4 Asts: McCallum, Nedović 3 PIR: Nedović 18	Boxscore	Pts: Timma 17; Rebs: Beaubois, Voigtmann 4 Asts: Granger 8 PIR: Granger 26	Arena: Palacio de Deportes José María Martín Carpena; Attendance: 6,528; Referees: Carmelo Paternicò (ITA), Emin Moğulkoç (TUR), Miloš Koljenšić (MNE)

26 January 2018	CSKA Moscow (Russia)	81–72	(Germany) Brose Bamberg	Moscow
18:00	Scoring by quarter: 18–19, 21–11, 16–16, 26–26
	Pts: De Colo 20; Rebs: Clyburn 8 Asts: Rodríguez 6 PIR: De Colo 28	Boxscore	Pts: Wright 11; Rebs: Wright 7 Asts: Lô 6 PIR: Wright 21	Arena: Megasport Arena; Attendance: 6,601; Referees: Juan Carlos García González (ESP), Oļegs Latiševs (LAT), Marko Juras (SRB)

26 January 2018	Fenerbahçe Doğuş (Turkey)	86–82	(Spain) FC Barcelona Lassa	Istanbul
18:45	Scoring by quarter: 22–18, 20–26, 23–13, 21–25
	Pts: Wanamaker 24; Rebs: Veselý, Wanamaker 5 Asts: Wanamaker 7 PIR: Wanamaker 33	Boxscore	Pts: Heurtel 21; Rebs: Tomić 7 Asts: Ribas 7 PIR: Tomić 27	Arena: Ülker Sports Arena; Attendance: 12,930; Referees: Ilija Belošević (SRB), Saša Pukl (SLO), Sérgio Silva (POR)

26 January 2018	Crvena zvezda mts (Serbia)	89–78	(Greece) Olympiacos	Belgrade
19:00	Scoring by quarter: 24–20, 19–14, 14–29, 32–15
	Pts: Ennis 21; Rebs: Ennis 8 Asts: Rochestie 6 PIR: Ennis 31	Boxscore	Pts: Spanoulis 16; Rebs: Papanikolaou 8 Asts: Papanikolaou 6 PIR: Papanikolaou 23	Arena: Aleksandar Nikolić Hall; Attendance: 5,993; Referees: Benjamín Jiménez (ESP), Piotr Pastusiak (POL), Joseph Bissang (FRA)

26 January 2018	Valencia Basket (Spain)	85–83	(Russia) Khimki	Valencia
20:30	Scoring by quarter: 23–24, 23–20, 17–20, 22–19
	Pts: Pleiß 15; Rebs: Pleiß 9 Asts: Van Rossom 7 PIR: Pleiß 23	Boxscore	Pts: Shved 22; Rebs: Anderson, Gill 7 Asts: Marković 8 PIR: Shved 20	Arena: Fuente de San Luis; Attendance: 6,924; Referees: Luigi Lamonica (ITA), Robert Lottermoser (GER), David Romano (ISR)

26 January 2018	AX Armani Exchange Olimpia (Italy)	102–111	(Israel) Maccabi Tel Aviv	Assago
20:45	Scoring by quarter: 26–30, 24–27, 20–26, 32–28
	Pts: Theodore 22; Rebs: Gudaitis 5 Asts: M'Baye 5 PIR: Gudaitis 27	Boxscore	Pts: Cole 19; Rebs: Jackson 6 Asts: Cole, Jackson 6 PIR: Cole 27	Arena: Mediolanum Forum; Attendance: 8,282; Referees: Matej Boltauzer (SLO), Elias Koromilas (GRE), Uroš Obrknežević (SRB)

=== Round 21 ===
1 February 2018	CSKA Moscow (Russia)	93–87	(Spain) Real Madrid	Moscow
18:00	Scoring by quarter: 33–11, 21–20, 24–29, 15–27
	Pts: Rodríguez 18; Rebs: Clyburn 10; Asts: De Colo, Rodríguez 5 PIR: Higgins 16	Boxscore	Pts: Dončić 21; Rebs: Tavares 9 Asts: Dončić 5 PIR: Dončić 23	Arena: Megasport Arena; Attendance: 12,322; Referees: Saša Pukl (SLO), Milivoje Jovčić (SRB), Carmelo Paternicò (ITA)

1 February 2018	Anadolu Efes (Turkey)	82–66	(Spain) Valencia Basket	Istanbul
18:00	Scoring by quarter: 23–19, 20–12, 20–22, 19–13
	Pts: McCollum 24; Rebs: Simon 8 Asts: McCollum 6 PIR: McCollum 32	Boxscore	Pts: Green 18; Rebs: Sastre, Thomas 6 Asts: Abalde 8 PIR: Green 16	Arena: Sinan Erdem Dome; Attendance: 2,673; Referees: Matej Boltauzer (SLO), Spiros Gkontas (GRE), Mehdi Difallah (FRA)

1 February 2018	FC Barcelona Lassa (Spain)	81–83	(Italy) AX Armani Exchange Olimpia	Barcelona
19:00	Scoring by quarter: 25–15, 23–27, 14–22, 19–19
	Pts: Tomić 14; Rebs: Tomić 6 Asts: Ribas 5 PIR: Tomić 24	Boxscore	Pts: Goudelock 20; Rebs: Gudaitis 9 Asts: Micov, Theodore 4 PIR: Gudaitis 26	Arena: Palau Blaugrana; Attendance: 4,002; Referees: Christos Christodoulou (GRE), Piotr Pastusiak (POL), Mario Majkić (SLO)

1 February 2018	Žalgiris (Lithuania)	99–84	(Israel) Maccabi Tel Aviv	Kaunas
19:00	Scoring by quarter: 26–20, 27–26, 23–16, 23–22
	Pts: Jankūnas 17; Rebs: Jankūnas, White 7 Asts: Pangos 11; PIR: Pangos 23	Boxscore	Pts: Roll 17; Rebs: Bolden 9 Asts: Bolden 5 PIR: Bolden 27	Arena: Žalgirio Arena; Attendance: 14,844; Referees: Daniel Hierrenzuelo (ESP), Miloš Koljenšić (MNE), Aare Halliko (FIN)

1 February 2018	Olympiacos (Greece)	95–70	(Turkey) Fenerbahçe Doğuş	Piraeus
20:00	Scoring by quarter: 34–18, 11–18, 26–18, 24–16
	Pts: Spanoulis, Strēlnieks 19; Rebs: Printezis 7 Asts: four players 3 PIR: Spanoulis, Strēlnieks 22	Boxscore	Pts: Dixon 24; Rebs: Düverioğlu, Veselý 5 Asts: Güler, Sloukas 3 PIR: Dixon 20	Arena: Peace and Friendship Stadium; Attendance: 10,892; Referees: Luigi Lamonica (ITA), Robert Lottermoser (GER), Carlos Peruga (ESP)

2 February 2018	Khimki (Russia)	68–66	(Spain) Unicaja	Mytishchi
18:00	Scoring by quarter: 9–11, 22–28, 19–16, 19–11
	Pts: Shved 22; Rebs: Honeycutt 15; Asts: Shved 4 PIR: Honeycutt 27	Boxscore	Pts: Waczyński 16; Rebs: Augustine 8 Asts: McCallum, Suárez 4 PIR: Augustine 19	Arena: Mytishchi Arena; Attendance: 6,624; Referees: Sreten Radović (CRO), Fernando Rocha (POR), Michele Rossi (ITA)

2 February 2018	Brose Bamberg (Germany)	95–74	(Greece) Panathinaikos Superfoods	Bamberg
20:00	Scoring by quarter: 23–17, 19–15, 15–23, 38–19
	Pts: Rubit 26; Rebs: Rubit 8 Asts: Lô 5 PIR: Rubit 34	Boxscore	Pts: Calathes 31; Rebs: Gist 4 Asts: Calathes 7 PIR: Calathes 30	Arena: Brose Arena; Attendance: 6,150; Referees: Ilija Belošević (SRB), Benjamín Jiménez (ESP), Tomislav Hordov (CRO)

2 February 2018	Kirolbet Baskonia (Spain)	103–84	(Serbia) Crvena zvezda mts	Vitoria-Gasteiz
20:30	Scoring by quarter: 27–17, 26–23, 22–19, 28–25
	Pts: Beaubois 25; Rebs: Shengelia 7 Asts: Huertas 7 PIR: Beaubois 24	Boxscore	Pts: Ennis 22; Rebs: Omić 4 Asts: Rochestie 5 PIR: Ennis 23	Arena: Fernando Buesa Arena; Attendance: 9,622; Referees: Borys Ryzhyk (UKR), Elias Koromilas (GRE), Sérgio Silva (POR)

=== Round 22 ===
8 February 2018	Maccabi Tel Aviv (Israel)	94–82	(Spain) FC Barcelona Lassa	Tel Aviv
20:05	Scoring by quarter: 22–23, 24–15, 19–23, 29–21
	Pts: Jackson 18; Rebs: Parakhouski 7 Asts: Cole 6 PIR: Parakhouski 19	Boxscore	Pts: Heurtel 18; Rebs: Moerman 7 Asts: Heurtel 10; PIR: Heurtel 23	Arena: Menora Mivtachim Arena; Attendance: 10,728; Referees: Milivoje Jovčić (SRB), Carmelo Paternicò (ITA), Jakub Zamojski (POL)

8 February 2018	Panathinaikos Superfoods (Greece)	80–76	(Spain) Kirolbet Baskonia	Athens
20:15	Scoring by quarter: 21–22, 25–18, 21–13, 13–23
	Pts: Gabriel, Gist 15; Rebs: Singleton 9 Asts: Calathes 11; PIR: Gabriel 19	Boxscore	Pts: Beaubois, Shengelia 15; Rebs: Voigtmann 8 Asts: Shengelia 4 PIR: Shengelia 22	Arena: Olympic Indoor Hall; Attendance: 8,567; Referees: Robert Lottermoser (GER), Sreten Radović (CRO), Amit Balak (ISR)

8 February 2018	Valencia Basket (Spain)	103–99	(Russia) CSKA Moscow	Valencia
20:30	Scoring by quarter: 21–23, 28–19, 24–24, 30–33
	Pts: Green 19; Rebs: three players 4 Asts: Abalde 6 PIR: three players 23	Boxscore	Pts: De Colo 30; Rebs: Vorontsevich 7 Asts: Antonov, De Colo 3 PIR: De Colo 31	Arena: Fuente de San Luis; Attendance: 7,058; Referees: Fernando Rocha (POR), Emin Moğulkoç (TUR), Mario Majkić (SLO)

8 February 2018	Unicaja (Spain)	81–68	(Turkey) Anadolu Efes	Málaga
20:45	Scoring by quarter: 23–12, 17–16, 23–27, 18–13
	Pts: Waczyński 20; Rebs: Augustine 12; Asts: Díaz, Milosavljević 5 PIR: Augustine 25	Boxscore	Pts: McCollum 16; Rebs: Dunston 5 Asts: Dragić, McCollum 3 PIR: McCollum 15	Arena: Palacio de Deportes José María Martín Carpena; Attendance: 6,065; Referees: Luigi Lamonica (ITA), Marcin Kowalski (POL), Arturas Šukys (LTU)

9 February 2018	Fenerbahçe Doğuş (Turkey)	77–69	(Germany) Brose Bamberg	Istanbul
18:45	Scoring by quarter: 16–13, 26–19, 19–16, 16–21
	Pts: Veselý 26; Rebs: Veselý 11; Asts: Wanamaker 5 PIR: Veselý 36	Boxscore	Pts: Musli 18; Rebs: Musli 8 Asts: Nikolić, Wright 3 PIR: Musli 22	Arena: Ülker Sports Arena; Attendance: 9,812; Referees: Christos Christodoulou (GRE), Borys Rhyzhyk (UKR), David Romano (ISR)

9 February 2018	Crvena zvezda mts (Serbia)	100–89	(Italy) AX Armani Exchange Olimpia	Belgrade
19:00	Scoring by quarter: 23–20, 27–25, 21–20, 29–24
	Pts: Janković, Lessort 15; Rebs: Lessort 10; Asts: Rochestie 9 PIR: Lessort 19	Boxscore	Pts: Kuzminskas 17; Rebs: Tarczewski 6 Asts: Theodore 8 PIR: Theodore 18	Arena: Aleksandar Nikolić Hall; Attendance: 4,895; Referees: Daniel Hierrezuelo (ESP), Spiros Gkontas (GRE), Aare Halliko (EST)

9 February 2018	Žalgiris (Lithuania)	74–84	(Russia) Khimki	Kaunas
19:00	Scoring by quarter: 26–15, 18–28, 15–18, 15–23
	Pts: Davies 15; Rebs: Pangos, White 6 Asts: Davies 3 PIR: Davies 21	Boxscore	Pts: Gill, Shved 20; Rebs: Thomas 6 Asts: Marković 8 PIR: Honeycutt 24	Arena: Žalgirio Arena; Attendance: 15,172; Referees: Saša Pukl (SLO), Juan Carlos García González (ESP), Clemens Fritz (GER)

9 February 2018	Real Madrid (Spain)	79–80	(Greece) Olympiacos	Madrid
20:45	Scoring by quarter: 20–21, 19–24, 23–20, 17–15
	Pts: Dončić 27; Rebs: Taylor, Thompkins 5 Asts: Campazzo, Dončić 3 PIR: Dončić 33	Boxscore	Pts: Printezis 21; Rebs: Milutinov 12; Asts: Strēlnieks 7 PIR: Printezis 26	Arena: WiZink Center; Attendance: 11,594; Referees: Ilija Belošević (SRB), Oļegs Latiševs (LAT), Anne Panther (GER)

=== Round 23 ===
22 February 2018	CSKA Moscow (Russia)	93–86	(Spain) Kirolbet Baskonia	Moscow
18:00	Scoring by quarter: 20–25, 26–24, 25–22, 22–15
	Pts: Clyburn 19; Rebs: Clyburn, Hines 5 Asts: De Colo 7 PIR: Clyburn 18	Boxscore	Pts: Granger 26; Rebs: Shengelia 10; Asts: Granger 5 PIR: Granger, Shengelia 25	Arena: Megasport Arena; Attendance: 8,712; Referees: Luigi Lamonica (ITA), Matej Boltauzer (SLO), Mehdi Difallah (FRA)

22 February 2018	Fenerbahçe Doğuş (Turkey)	89–70	(Italy) AX Armani Exchange Olimpia	Istanbul
18:45	Scoring by quarter: 23–20, 25–13, 17–15, 24–22
	Pts: Thompson 15; Rebs: Melli 6 Asts: Sloukas, Wanamaker 6 PIR: Sloukas 19	Boxscore	Pts: Micov 19; Rebs: Tarczewski 8 Asts: Cinciarini 7 PIR: Micov 21	Arena: Ülker Sports Arena; Attendance: 10,164; Referees: Juan Carlos García González (ESP), Milivoje Jovčić (SRB), Ioannis Foufis (GRE)

22 February 2018	Olympiacos (Greece)	80–70	(Spain) Valencia Basket	Piraeus
20:00	Scoring by quarter: 22–11, 18–28, 22–16, 18–15
	Pts: Spanoulis 25; Rebs: Papanikolaou 10; Asts: Spanoulis 9 PIR: Spanoulis 29	Boxscore	Pts: San Emeterio 19; Rebs: Dubljević 6 Asts: three players 2 PIR: San Emeterio 15	Arena: Peace and Friendship Stadium; Attendance: 7,669; Referees: Saša Pukl (SLO), Borys Ryzhyk (UKR), Jakub Zamojski (POL)

22 February 2018	Unicaja (Spain)	83–69	(Israel) Maccabi Tel Aviv	Málaga
20:45	Scoring by quarter: 23–19, 19–22, 18–14, 23–14
	Pts: Nedović 15; Rebs: Augustine 9 Asts: Díaz 6 PIR: Augustine, McCallum 18	Boxscore	Pts: Kane 15; Rebs: Jackson, Parakhouski 5 Asts: Jackson 8 PIR: Kane 16	Arena: Palacio de Deportes José María Martín Carpena; Attendance: 7,482; Referees: Spiros Gkontas (GRE), Tomislav Hordov (CRO), Clemens Fritz (GER)

23 February 2018	Khimki (Russia)	78–61	(Greece) Panathinaikos Superfoods	Mytishchi
18:00	Scoring by quarter: 24–18, 22–13, 17–15, 15–15
	Pts: Shved 20; Rebs: Honeycutt 10; Asts: Marković 5 PIR: Shved 17	Boxscore	Pts: Singleton 14; Rebs: Calathes 6 Asts: Calathes, James 5 PIR: Singleton 14	Arena: Mytishchi Arena; Attendance: 7,028; Referees: Carmelo Paternicò (ITA), Emilio Pérez Pizarro (ESP), Mario Majkič (SLO)

23 February 2018	Anadolu Efes (Turkey)	70–86	(Lithuania) Žalgiris	Istanbul
18:30	Scoring by quarter: 23–21, 13–24, 20–23, 14–18
	Pts: McCollum 14; Rebs: Dunston 8 Asts: Douglas 5 PIR: Dunston 19	Boxscore	Pts: White 15; Rebs: Ulanovas 5 Asts: Micić, Pangos 6 PIR: White 22	Arena: Sinan Erdem Dome; Attendance: 3,035; Referees: Miguel Pérez Pérez (ESP), Ilija Belošević (SRB), Elias Koromilas (GRE)

23 February 2018	Brose Bamberg (Germany)	86–62	(Serbia) Crvena zvezda mts	Bamberg
20:45	Scoring by quarter: 21–23, 25–13, 23–9, 17–17
	Pts: Wright 21; Rebs: Musli 13; Asts: Zisis 6 PIR: Wright 29	Boxscore	Pts: Lessort 12; Rebs: Lessort 6 Asts: Bjelica, Rochestie 4 PIR: Lessort 19	Arena: Brose Arena; Attendance: 5,851; Referees: Oļegs Latiševs (LAT), Piotr Pastusiak (POL), Carlos Cortés (ESP)

23 February 2018	FC Barcelona Lassa (Spain)	74–101	(Spain) Real Madrid	Barcelona
21:00	Scoring by quarter: 13–30, 22–22, 22–31, 17–18
	Pts: Heurtel, Vezenkov 11; Rebs: Moerman 5 Asts: Heurtel 6 PIR: Heurtel 16	Boxscore	Pts: Carroll 18; Rebs: Ayón 8 Asts: Campazzo 9 PIR: Campazzo 24	Arena: Palau Blaugrana; Attendance: 6,829; Referees: Robert Lottermoser (GER), Sreten Radović (CRO), Milan Nedović (SLO)

=== Round 24 ===
1 March 2018	Žalgiris (Lithuania)	90–74	(Spain) FC Barcelona Lassa	Kaunas
19:00	Scoring by quarter: 19–15, 25–19, 26–16, 20–24
	Pts: Toupane 21; Rebs: Ulanovas, White 6 Asts: Ulanovas 7 PIR: Pangos, Toupane 19	Boxscore	Pts: Oriola 18; Rebs: Claver 5 Asts: Heurtel 9 PIR: Oriola 20	Arena: Žalgirio Arena; Attendance: 14,477; Referees: Borys Ryzhyk (UKR), Oļegs Latiševs (LAT), Anne Panther (GER)

1 March 2018	Maccabi Tel Aviv (Israel)	73–93	(Russia) CSKA Moscow	Tel Aviv
20:05	Scoring by quarter: 18–22, 18–30, 20–15, 17–26
	Pts: Cole 13; Rebs: Bolden, Kane 6 Asts: Jackson 7 PIR: Bolden 20	Boxscore	Pts: De Colo 19; Rebs: Vorontsevich 7 Asts: Rodríguez 5 PIR: De Colo 27	Arena: Menora Mivtachim Arena; Attendance: 10,582; Referees: Saša Pukl (SLO), Carlos Peruga (ESP), Sérgio Silva (POR)

1 March 2018	Valencia Basket (Spain)	86–70	(Germany) Brose Bamberg	Valencia
20:30	Scoring by quarter: 28–11, 9–23, 23–20, 26–16
	Pts: Abalde 18; Rebs: Dubljević, Thomas 7 Asts: Martínez, San Emeterio 5 PIR: San Emeterio 20	Boxscore	Pts: Musli 14; Rebs: Musli 6 Asts: Hackett, Wright 3 PIR: Musli 18	Arena: Fuente de San Luis; Attendance: 6,640; Referees: Sreten Radović (CRO), Spiros Gkontas (GRE), Robert Vyklický (CZE)

1 March 2018	AX Armani Exchange Olimpia (Italy)	77–64	(Turkey) Anadolu Efes	Assago
20:45	Scoring by quarter: 17–17, 27–12, 14–16, 19–19
	Pts: M'Baye 14; Rebs: Gudaitis 10; Asts: Jerrells 5 PIR: Jerrells 17	Boxscore	Pts: Weems 19; Rebs: three players 6 Asts: Balbay 3 PIR: Štimac, Weems 15	Arena: Mediolanum Forum; Attendance: 6,281; Referees: Benjamín Jiménez (ESP), Piotr Pastusiak (POL), Sašo Petek (SLO)

1 March 2018	Kirolbet Baskonia (Spain)	87–77	(Russia) Khimki	Vitoria-Gasteiz
21:00	Scoring by quarter: 18–26, 26–13, 25–13, 18–25
	Pts: Beaubois 16; Rebs: Shengelia 15; Asts: Granger, Huertas 4 PIR: Shengelia 28	Boxscore	Pts: Shved 23; Rebs: Gill, Todorović 6 Asts: Anderson 4 PIR: Gill 26	Arena: Fernando Buesa Arena; Attendance: 9,684; Referees: Ilija Belošević (SRB), Emin Moğulkoç (TUR), Jakub Zamojski (POL)

2 March 2018	Crvena zvezda mts (Serbia)	80–76	(Spain) Unicaja	Belgrade
19:00	Scoring by quarter: 24–24, 16–13, 22–15, 18–24
	Pts: Rochestie 21; Rebs: Lessort 8 Asts: Feldeine, Rochestie 4 PIR: Rochestie 21	Boxscore	Pts: Waczyński 13; Rebs: Augustine 9 Asts: Augustine 4 PIR: Augustine, Brooks 15	Arena: Aleksandar Nikolić Hall; Attendance: 4,873; Referees: Carmelo Paternicò (ITA), Amit Balak (ISR), Moritz Reiter (GER)

2 March 2018	Panathinaikos Superfoods (Greece)	85–87(OT)	(Greece) Olympiacos	Athens
20:15	Scoring by quarter: 18–16, 16–27, 16–19, 21–9, Overtime: 14–16
	Pts: Calathes 23; Rebs: Singleton 8 Asts: Calathes 10; PIR: Calathes 25	Boxscore	Pts: Roberts 18; Rebs: Papanikolaou, Printezis 6 Asts: Brown 3 PIR: Roberts 18	Arena: Olympic Indoor Hall; Attendance: 17,401; Referees: Daniel Hierrezuelo (ESP), Damir Javor (SLO), Fernando Rocha (POR)

2 March 2018	Real Madrid (Spain)	83–86	(Turkey) Fenerbahçe Doğuş	Madrid
21:00	Scoring by quarter: 20–20, 25–20, 20–28, 18–18
	Pts: Carroll 15; Rebs: Ayón, Tavares 6 Asts: Campazzo 5 PIR: Dončić 17	Boxscore	Pts: Sloukas 20; Rebs: Thompson 6 Asts: Sloukas 4 PIR: Sloukas 24	Arena: WiZink Center; Attendance: 11,385; Referees: Luigi Lamonica (ITA), Matej Boltauzer (SLO), Tomislav Hordov (CRO)

=== Round 25 ===
8 March 2018	Khimki (Russia)	77–86	(Italy) AX Armani Exchange Olimpia	Mytishchi
18:00	Scoring by quarter: 20–30, 19–19, 23–12, 15–25
	Pts: Shved 24; Rebs: Marković 6 Asts: Marković, Shved 6 PIR: Shved 23	Boxscore	Pts: Goudelock 26; Rebs: Gudaitis, Micov 8 Asts: Cinciarini 4 PIR: Goudelock 27	Arena: Mytishchi Arena; Attendance: 6,418; Referees: Saša Pukl (SLO), Sérgio Silva (POR), Rain Peerandi (EST)

8 March 2018	Anadolu Efes (Turkey)	81–94	(Israel) Maccabi Tel Aviv	Istanbul
18:30	Scoring by quarter: 21–20, 21–23, 20–24, 19–27
	Pts: Weems 21; Rebs: three players 5 Asts: Weems 6 PIR: Dunston 20	Boxscore	Pts: Jackson 18; Rebs: Kane 9 Asts: Roll 7 PIR: Roll 23	Arena: Sinan Erdem Dome; Attendance: 2,720; Referees: Luigi Lamonica (ITA), Ioannis Foufis (GRE), Marko Juras (SRB)

8 March 2018	Valencia Basket (Spain)	71–81	(Spain) Kirolbet Baskonia	Valencia
20:30	Scoring by quarter: 20–16, 16–15, 19–22, 16–28
	Pts: San Emeterio 15; Rebs: Doornekamp, Thomas 5 Asts: Vives 4 PIR: San Emeterio 15	Boxscore	Pts: Huertas 19; Rebs: Poirier 12; Asts: Huertas 7 PIR: Huertas 28	Arena: Fuente de San Luis; Attendance: 7,026; Referees: Christos Christodoulou (GRE), Damir Javor (SLO), Clemens Fritz (GER)

8 March 2018	Real Madrid (Spain)	92–75	(Greece) Panathinaikos Superfoods	Madrid
21:00	Scoring by quarter: 19–20, 19–17, 26–18, 28–20
	Pts: Causeur 26; Rebs: Tavares 7 Asts: Campazzo 5 PIR: Causeur 29	Boxscore	Pts: James 23; Rebs: Antetokounmpo 7 Asts: James 4 PIR: James 24	Arena: WiZink Center; Attendance: 10,081; Referees: Ilija Belošević (SRB), Borys Ryzhyk (UKR), Emin Moğulkoç (TUR)

9 March 2018	CSKA Moscow (Russia)	101–76	(Spain) Unicaja	Moscow
18:00	Scoring by quarter: 30–20, 27–23, 22–18, 22–15
	Pts: De Colo 23; Rebs: Kurbanov 6 Asts: Rodríguez 7 PIR: De Colo 21	Boxscore	Pts: Nedović 15; Rebs: Augustine 7 Asts: three players 5 PIR: Augustine 18	Arena: Megasport Arena; Attendance: 9,344; Referees: Sreten Radović (CRO), Oļegs Latiševs (LAT), Joseph Bissang (FRA)

9 March 2018	Žalgiris (Lithuania)	78–85	(Turkey) Fenerbahçe Doğuş	Kaunas
19:00	Scoring by quarter: 24–17, 16–14, 18–21, 20–33
	Pts: Jankūnas 15; Rebs: Jankūnas, Milaknis 5 Asts: Micić 5 PIR: Jankūnas 23	Boxscore	Pts: Datome 16; Rebs: Melli 5 Asts: Kalinić 6 PIR: Sloukas 21	Arena: Žalgirio Arena; Attendance: 15,238; Referees: Robert Lottermoser (GER), Emilio Pérez Pizarro (ESP), Michele Rossi (ITA)

9 March 2018	Olympiacos (Greece)	87–79	(Germany) Brose Bamberg	Piraeus
20:00	Scoring by quarter: 27–19, 15–23, 27–19, 18–18
	Pts: Spanoulis 17; Rebs: McLean, Milutinov 6 Asts: Spanoulis 8 PIR: Milutinov 26	Boxscore	Pts: Wright 23; Rebs: Wright 6 Asts: Hackett 6 PIR: Wright 19	Arena: Peace and Friendship Stadium; Attendance: 8,787; Referees: Matej Boltauzer (SLO), Benjamín Jiménez (ESP), Miloš Koljenšić (MNE)

9 March 2018	FC Barcelona Lassa (Spain)	88–54	(Serbia) Crvena zvezda mts	Barcelona
21:00	Scoring by quarter: 17–12, 28–12, 17–25, 26–5
	Pts: Ribas 18; Rebs: Moerman 9 Asts: Ribas 6 PIR: Ribas 25	Boxscore	Pts: Rochestie 13; Rebs: Omić 5 Asts: Rochestie 3 PIR: Rochestie 14	Arena: Palau Blaugrana; Attendance: 6,829; Referees: Fernando Rocha (POR), Spiros Gkontas (GRE), Petri Mäntylä (FIN)

=== Round 26 ===
13 March 2018	AX Armani Exchange Olimpia (Italy)	77–88	(Spain) Real Madrid	Assago
20:45	Scoring by quarter: 17–25, 19–24, 18–19, 23–20
	Pts: Jerrells 18; Rebs: Goudelock 7 Asts: Jerrells 6 PIR: Jerrells 22	Boxscore	Pts: Ayón 15; Rebs: Thompkins 8 Asts: Campazzo 11; PIR: Campazzo 27	Arena: Mediolanum Forum; Attendance: 10,243; Referees: Christos Christodoulou (GRE), Oļegs Latiševs (LAT), Robert Vyklický (CZE)

15 March 2018	Crvena zvezda mts (Serbia)	106–90	(Spain) Valencia Basket	Belgrade
18:45	Scoring by quarter: 23–23, 27–25, 29–19, 27–23
	Pts: Feldeine 30; Rebs: Lessort 7 Asts: Rochestie 5 PIR: Feldeine 32	Boxscore	Pts: Martínez 22; Rebs: Dubljević, Pleiß 4 Asts: Abalde 6 PIR: Martínez 23	Arena: Aleksandar Nikolić Hall; Attendance: 4,472; Referees: Robert Lottermoser (GER), Elias Koromilas (GRE), Mykola Ambrosov (UKR)

15 March 2018	Brose Bamberg (Germany)	88–79	(Turkey) Anadolu Efes	Bamberg
20:00	Scoring by quarter: 22–22, 22–19, 25–14, 19–24
	Pts: Radošević, Wright 15; Rebs: Rubit 10; Asts: Zisis 5 PIR: Radošević, Wright 21	Boxscore	Pts: McCollum 21; Rebs: Balbay, McCollum 6 Asts: Weems 6 PIR: Štimac 20	Arena: Brose Arena; Attendance: 6,150; Referees: Ilija Belošević (SRB), Carlos Cortés (ESP), Igor Dragojević (MNE)

15 March 2018	Olympiacos (Greece)	63–90	(Spain) FC Barcelona Lassa	Piraeus
20:00	Scoring by quarter: 17–22, 21–18, 14–23, 11–27
	Pts: McLean, Printezis 14; Rebs: McLean 12; Asts: Spanoulis 5 PIR: McLean 23	Boxscore	Pts: Tomić 19; Rebs: Moerman 13; Asts: Heurtel 7 PIR: Tomić 26	Arena: Peace and Friendship Stadium; Attendance: 10,032; Referees: Sreten Radović (CRO), Milivoje Jovčić (SRB), Piotr Pastusiak (POL)

15 March 2018	Maccabi Tel Aviv (Israel)	91–94	(Russia) Khimki	Tel Aviv
20:05	Scoring by quarter: 19–21, 20–23, 27–21, 25–29
	Pts: Jackson 25; Rebs: Kane 9 Asts: Jackson 7 PIR: Jackson 28	Boxscore	Pts: Gill 24; Rebs: Gill, Thomas 7 Asts: Shved 12; PIR: Shved 29	Arena: Menora Mivtachim Arena; Attendance: 10,878; Referees: Juan Carlos García González (ESP), Matej Boltauzer (SLO), Spiros Gkontas (GRE)

15 March 2018	Kirolbet Baskonia (Spain)	84–64	(Lithuania) Žalgiris	Vitoria-Gasteiz
20:45	Scoring by quarter: 27–19, 16–14, 24–12, 17–19
	Pts: Granger 20; Rebs: Voigtmann 7 Asts: Vildoza 10; PIR: Granger 21	Boxscore	Pts: Pangos 12; Rebs: Toupane 5 Asts: Micić 4 PIR: Micić, Pangos 10	Arena: Fernando Buesa Arena; Attendance: 11,227; Referees: Saša Pukl (SLO), Tomislav Hordov (CRO), Ioannis Foufis (GRE)

16 March 2018	Fenerbahçe Doğuş (Turkey)	79–81	(Russia) CSKA Moscow	Istanbul
18:45	Scoring by quarter: 23–25, 17–19, 18–10, 21–27
	Pts: Melli 18; Rebs: Veselý 7 Asts: Sloukas 5 PIR: Veselý 23	Boxscore	Pts: Vorontsevich 17; Rebs: Clyburn, Vorontsevich 4 Asts: De Colo 8 PIR: Vorontsevich 22	Arena: Ülker Sports Arena; Attendance: 12,947; Referees: Daniel Hierrezuelo (ESP), Damir Javor (SLO), Carmelo Paternicò (ITA)

16 March 2018	Unicaja (Spain)	79–90	(Greece) Panathinaikos Superfoods	Málaga
21:00	Scoring by quarter: 24–18, 20–14, 16–26, 19–32
	Pts: Nedović 19; Rebs: Augustine 5 Asts: Nedović 7 PIR: Nedović 24	Boxscore	Pts: Rivers 24; Rebs: Calathes 8 Asts: Calathes 11; PIR: Rivers 27	Arena: Palacio de Deportes José María Martín Carpena; Attendance: 8,043; Referees: Luigi Lamonica (ITA), Petri Mäntylä (FIN), Marcin Kowalski (POL)

=== Round 27 ===
20 March 2018	Fenerbahçe Doğuş (Turkey)	87–73	(Israel) Maccabi Tel Aviv	Istanbul
18:45	Scoring by quarter: 16–21, 29–15, 29–20, 13–17
	Pts: Gudurić 23; Rebs: Thompson 7 Asts: Sloukas 5 PIR: Gudurić 29	Boxscore	Pts: Jackson 13; Rebs: Bolden, Parakhouski 7 Asts: Jackson 3 PIR: Bolden 17	Arena: Ülker Sports Arena; Attendance: 10,909; Referees: Miguel Pérez Pérez (ESP), Oļegs Latiševs (LAT), Piotr Pastusiak (POL)

20 March 2018	Žalgiris (Lithuania)	77–65	(Italy) AX Armani Exchange Olimpia	Kaunas
19:00	Scoring by quarter: 17–16, 14–18, 23–16, 23–15
	Pts: White 16; Rebs: White 8 Asts: Pangos 10; PIR: White 22	Boxscore	Pts: Gudaitis 19; Rebs: Gudaitis 10; Asts: Jerrells 5 PIR: Gudaitis 26	Arena: Žalgirio Arena; Attendance: 13,747; Referees: Milivoje Jovčić (SRB), Elias Koromilas (GRE), Emin Moğulkoç (TUR)

20 March 2018	Panathinaikos Superfoods (Greece)	91–71	(Serbia) Crvena zvezda mts	Athens
20:15	Scoring by quarter: 24–15, 23–23, 30–18, 14–15
	Pts: Singleton 21; Rebs: Payne 9 Asts: Calathes 10; PIR: Calathes 34	Boxscore	Pts: Davidovac 17; Rebs: Janković, Omić 7 Asts: Rochestie 6 PIR: Omić 18	Arena: Olympic Indoor Hall; Attendance: 10,146; Referees: Carmelo Paternicò (ITA), Carlos Peruga (ESP), Clemens Fritz (GER)

20 March 2018	Valencia Basket (Spain)	96–88	(Spain) Real Madrid	Valencia
20:30	Scoring by quarter: 22–21, 24–19, 24–20, 26–28
	Pts: Dubljević 17; Rebs: Dubljević 7 Asts: Van Rossom 5 PIR: Dubljević 18	Boxscore	Pts: Campazzo, Taylor 17; Rebs: Randolph 9 Asts: Campazzo 12; PIR: Campazzo 29	Arena: Fuente de San Luis; Attendance: 7,020; Referees: Saša Pukl (SLO), Spiros Gkontas (GRE), Uroš Obrknežević (SRB)

21 March 2018	CSKA Moscow (Russia)	89–81	(Greece) Olympiacos	Moscow
18:00	Scoring by quarter: 23–26, 21–14, 25–22, 20–19
	Pts: De Colo 25; Rebs: Clyburn 6 Asts: De Colo, Higgins 4 PIR: De Colo 31	Boxscore	Pts: Printezis 24; Rebs: three players 5 Asts: Spanoulis 6 PIR: Printezis 28	Arena: Megasport Arena; Attendance: 11,923; Referees: Luigi Lamonica (ITA), Juan Carlos García González (ESP), Sašo Petek (SLO)

21 March 2018	Anadolu Efes (Turkey)	73–85	(Russia) Khimki	Istanbul
18:45	Scoring by quarter: 29–18, 20–24, 12–19, 12–24
	Pts: Dunston 19; Rebs: Dunston 7 Asts: Balbay, Simon 4 PIR: Dunston 31	Boxscore	Pts: Thomas 17; Rebs: Gill 7 Asts: Shved 8 PIR: Thomas 21	Arena: Sinan Erdem Dome; Attendance: 1,979; Referees: Borys Rhyzhyk (UKR), Oļegs Latiševs (LAT), Michele Rossi (ITA)

21 March 2018	Kirolbet Baskonia (Spain)	103–79	(Germany) Brose Bamberg	Vitoria-Gasteiz
20:30	Scoring by quarter: 27–14, 23–25, 30–13, 23–27
	Pts: Granger 17; Rebs: Diop 6 Asts: Granger 7 PIR: Granger 23	Boxscore	Pts: Zisis 17; Rebs: Wright 6 Asts: Musli 5 PIR: Musli 18	Arena: Fernando Buesa Arena; Attendance: 11,865; Referees: Sreten Radović (CRO), Fernando Rocha (POR), Robert Vyklický (CZE)

21 March 2018	Unicaja (Spain)	95–91	(Spain) FC Barcelona Lassa	Málaga
20:45	Scoring by quarter: 19–25, 30–21, 27–22, 19–23
	Pts: Díez 21; Rebs: Augustine 7 Asts: three players 4 PIR: Díez 27	Boxscore	Pts: Tomić 22; Rebs: Tomić 11; Asts: Heurtel 10; PIR: Tomić 31	Arena: Palacio de Deportes José María Martín Carpena; Attendance: 6,925; Referees: Robert Lottermoser (GER), Matej Boltauzer (SLO), Ingus Baumanis (LAT)

=== Round 28 ===
22 March 2018	Crvena zvezda mts (Serbia)	63–80	(Turkey) Fenerbahçe Doğuş	Belgrade
19:00	Scoring by quarter: 17–22, 14–18, 10–25, 22–15
	Pts: Davidovac 18; Rebs: Lessort 6 Asts: Lessort 4 PIR: Davidovac 25	Boxscore	Pts: Muhammed 25; Rebs: Melli 7 Asts: Gudurić 5 PIR: Muhammed 28	Arena: Aleksandar Nikolić Hall; Attendance: 4,849; Referees: Emilio Pérez Pizarro (ESP), Spiros Gkontas (GRE), Amit Balak (ISR)

22 March 2018	Maccabi Tel Aviv (Israel)	75–76	(Greece) Panathinaikos Superfoods	Tel Aviv
20:05	Scoring by quarter: 20–18, 21–17, 17–21, 17–20
	Pts: Kane 19; Rebs: Kane 9 Asts: Roll 6 PIR: Kane 34	Boxscore	Pts: James 27; Rebs: Singleton 10; Asts: Calathes, James 4 PIR: James 26	Arena: Menora Mivtachim Arena; Attendance: 9,388; Referees: Milivoje Jovčić (SRB), Benjamín Jiménez (ESP), Emin Moğulkoç (TUR)

22 March 2018	Real Madrid (Spain)	88–81	(Lithuania) Žalgiris	Madrid
20:45	Scoring by quarter: 19–16, 22–28, 24–18, 23–19
	Pts: Reyes 16; Rebs: Tavares 9 Asts: Campazzo 8 PIR: Reyes 21	Boxscore	Pts: Jankūnas 21; Rebs: Jankūnas, Milaknis 4 Asts: Micić 7 PIR: Jankūnas 19	Arena: WiZink Center; Attendance: 10,496; Referees: Ilija Belošević (SRB), Piotr Pastusiak (POL), Mario Majkič (SLO)

22 March 2018	AX Armani Exchange Olimpia (Italy)	89–93	(Spain) Valencia Basket	Desio
20:45	Scoring by quarter: 23–17, 20–23, 22–28, 24–25
	Pts: Micov 27; Rebs: Gudaitis 8 Asts: Micov 4 PIR: Micov 34	Boxscore	Pts: Green 18; Rebs: Pleiß 8 Asts: San Emeterio 6 PIR: Dubljević, Pleiß 14	Arena: PalaBancoDesio; Attendance: 5,528; Referees: Damir Javor (SLO), Aare Halliko (EST), Igor Dragojević (MNE)

23 March 2018	Khimki (Russia)	73–90	(Russia) CSKA Moscow	Mytishchi
18:00	Scoring by quarter: 17–29, 20–24, 21–15, 15–22
	Pts: Shved 20; Rebs: Robinson 5 Asts: Shved 8 PIR: Shved 18	Boxscore	Pts: De Colo 17; Rebs: Hunter 7 Asts: Rodríguez 8 PIR: Hunter 20	Arena: Mytishchi Arena; Attendance: 6,789; Referees: Sreten Radović (CRO), Carlos Peruga (ESP), David Romano (ISR)

23 March 2018	Brose Bamberg (Germany)	93–88	(Spain) Unicaja	Bamberg
19:00	Scoring by quarter: 28–19, 27–23, 22–26, 16–20
	Pts: Hickman 28; Rebs: Musli, Wright 5 Asts: three players 4 PIR: Hickman 29	Boxscore	Pts: Nedović 26; Rebs: Augustine, Suárez 8 Asts: Nedović 5 PIR: Nedović 22	Arena: Brose Arena; Attendance: 6,150; Referees: Saša Pukl (SLO), Elias Koromilas (GRE), Renaud Geller (BEL)

23 March 2018	Olympiacos (Greece)	89–82	(Turkey) Anadolu Efes	Piraeus
20:00	Scoring by quarter: 30–15, 19–27, 21–15, 19–25
	Pts: Milutinov 20; Rebs: Milutinov, Printezis 8 Asts: Spanoulis 8 PIR: Milutinov 29	Boxscore	Pts: Simon 18; Rebs: Simon 6 Asts: Simon 8 PIR: Simon 26	Arena: Peace and Friendship Stadium; Attendance: 8,164; Referees: Miguel Pérez Pérez (ESP), Miloš Koljenšić (MNE), Mehdi Difallah (FRA)

23 March 2018	FC Barcelona Lassa (Spain)	73–86	(Spain) Kirolbet Baskonia	Barcelona
21:00	Scoring by quarter: 16–16, 24–27, 18–20, 15–23
	Pts: Koponen 21; Rebs: Moerman 8 Asts: Pressey 3 PIR: Jackson, Koponen 17	Boxscore	Pts: Voigtmann 17; Rebs: Poirier 8 Asts: Poirier 5 PIR: Poirier 22	Arena: Palau Blaugrana; Attendance: 6,829; Referees: Christos Christodoulou (GRE), Borys Rhyzhyk (UKR), Jakub Zamojski (POL)

=== Round 29 ===
29 March 2018	Khimki (Russia)	64–73	(Turkey) Fenerbahçe Doğuş	Mytishchi
17:45	Scoring by quarter: 18–20, 20–17, 15–22, 11–14
	Pts: Shved 19; Rebs: Gill 8 Asts: Shved 8 PIR: Gill 20	Boxscore	Pts: Wanamaker 14; Rebs: Melli 10; Asts: Wanamaker 4 PIR: Melli 27	Arena: Mytishchi Arena; Attendance: 5,113; Referees: Juan Carlos García González (ESP), Fernando Rocha (POR), Tomislav Hordov (CRO)

29 March 2018	Anadolu Efes (Turkey)	83–107	(Spain) FC Barcelona Lassa	Istanbul
19:45	Scoring by quarter: 19–23, 15–32, 33–26, 16–26
	Pts: Motum 19; Rebs: Štimac 4 Asts: Simon 7 PIR: Motum 21	Boxscore	Pts: Heurtel 20; Rebs: Moerman 9 Asts: Heurtel 9 PIR: Heurtel 29	Arena: Sinan Erdem; Attendance: 1,920; Referees: Luigi Lamonica (ITA), Ioannis Foufis (GRE), Sérgio Silva (POR)

29 March 2018	Brose Bamberg (Germany)	78–83	(Italy) AX Armani Exchange Olimpia	Bamberg
20:00	Scoring by quarter: 23–28, 20–15, 21–17, 14–23
	Pts: Hackett 17; Rebs: Mitrović 6 Asts: three players 3 PIR: Rubit 19	Boxscore	Pts: Micov 14; Rebs: Gudaitis 6 Asts: Jerrels 4 PIR: Gudaitis 17	Arena: Brose Arena; Attendance: 6,150; Referees: Oļegs Latiševs (LAT), Benjamín Jiménez (ESP), Spiros Gkontas (GRE)

29 March 2018	Kirolbet Baskonia (Spain)	83–72	(Israel) Maccabi Tel Aviv	Vitoria-Gasteiz
21:00	Scoring by quarter: 22–18, 16–16, 18–19, 27–19
	Pts: Voigtmann 14; Rebs: Poirier 9 Asts: Granger 5 PIR: Voigtmann 17	Boxscore	Pts: Jackson 14; Rebs: Bolden, Kane 8 Asts: Cole, Jackson 5 PIR: Parakhouski 19	Arena: Fernando Buesa Arena; Attendance: 13,827; Referees: Saša Pukl (SLO), Elias Koromilas (GRE), Miloš Koljenšić (MNE)

30 March 2018	Unicaja (Spain)	87–85(OT)	(Greece) Olympiacos	Málaga
18:00	Scoring by quarter: 19–22, 28–11, 7–23, 20–18, Overtime: 13–11
	Pts: Nedović 17; Rebs: Augustine 8 Asts: Suárez 7 PIR: McCallum 18	Boxscore	Pts: Spanoulis 15; Rebs: Milutinov 12; Asts: Spanoulis 8 PIR: Milutinov 22	Arena: José María Martín Carpena; Attendance: 5,751; Referees: Ilija Belošević (SRB), Carmelo Paternicò (ITA), Petri Mäntylä (FIN)

30 March 2018	Crvena zvezda mts (Serbia)	79–82	(Spain) Real Madrid	Belgrade
19:00	Scoring by quarter: 20–27, 19–16, 18–21, 22–18
	Pts: Omić 25; Rebs: Omić 10; Asts: Feldeine 9 PIR: Omić 30	Boxscore	Pts: Dončić 24; Rebs: Dončić, Reyes 9 Asts: Fernández 5 PIR: Dončić 35	Arena: Aleksandar Nikolić Hall; Attendance: 5,745; Referees: Christos Christodoulou (GRE), Jakub Zamojski (POL), Emin Moğulkoç (TUR)

30 March 2018	Žalgiris (Lithuania)	85–73	(Russia) CSKA Moscow	Kaunas
19:00	Scoring by quarter: 23–18, 25–24, 16–18, 21–13
	Pts: Davies 17; Rebs: Ulanovas 6 Asts: Pangos 11; PIR: Pangos 28	Boxscore	Pts: De Colo 18; Rebs: Kurbanov 5 Asts: Westermann 5 PIR: De Colo 14	Arena: Žalgirio Arena; Attendance: 15,525; Referees: Daniel Hierrezuelo (ESP), Borys Ryzhyk (UKR), Emilio Pérez Pizarro (ESP)

30 March 2018	Panathinaikos Superfoods (Greece)	75–56	(Spain) Valencia Basket	Athens
20:15	Scoring by quarter: 23–13, 17–18, 17–16, 18–9
	Pts: Calathes 17; Rebs: Payne 8 Asts: Calathes 10; PIR: Calathes 25	Boxscore	Pts: Green 10; Rebs: Hlinason, Pleiß 6 Asts: four players 2 PIR: Hlinason 9	Arena: Olympic Indoor Hall; Attendance: 12,767; Referees: Sreten Radović (CRO), Matej Boltauzer (SLO), Piotr Pastusiak (POL)

=== Round 30 ===
5 April 2018	CSKA Moscow (Russia)	92–81	(Serbia) Crvena zvezda mts	Moscow
19:00	Scoring by quarter: 23–24, 14–20, 27–19, 28–18
	Pts: Fridzon 20; Rebs: Clyburn, Rodríguez 4 Asts: Higgins, Westermann 5 PIR: Fridzon 29	Boxscore	Pts: Rochestie 13; Rebs: Janković 8 Asts: Rochestie 5 PIR: Dobrić 18	Arena: Megasport Arena; Attendance: 7,209; Referees: Miguel Pérez Pérez (ESP), Fernando Rocha (POR), Rain Peerandi (EST)

5 April 2018	Fenerbahçe Doğuş (Turkey)	91–99(OT)	(Spain) Unicaja	Istanbul
19:15	Scoring by quarter: 14–22, 22–25, 15–12, 32–24, Overtime: 8–16
	Pts: Sloukas 26; Rebs: Datome 6 Asts: Sloukas 7 PIR: Sloukas 33	Boxscore	Pts: Nedović 31; Rebs: Brooks 6 Asts: Nedović 8 PIR: Nedović 36	Arena: Ülker Sports Arena; Attendance: 10,012; Referees: Sreten Radović (CRO), Piotr Pastusiak (POL), David Romano (ISR)

5 April 2018	AX Armani Exchange Olimpia (Italy)	95–96(OT)	(Greece) Panathinaikos Superfoods	Assago
20:45	Scoring by quarter: 27–18, 28–24, 14–19, 18–26, Overtime: 8–9
	Pts: Gudaitis 18; Rebs: Gudaitis 10; Asts: Cinciarini 5 PIR: Gudaitis 29	Boxscore	Pts: three players 18; Rebs: Gist, Singleton 5 Asts: Calathes 6 PIR: Calathes 21	Arena: Mediolanum Forum; Attendance: 6,626; Referees: Daniel Hierrezuelo (ESP), Mario Majkić (SLO), Mehdi Difallah (FRA)

5 April 2018	FC Barcelona Lassa (Spain)	86–82	(Russia) Khimki	Barcelona
21:00	Scoring by quarter: 31–18, 23–27, 18–21, 14–16
	Pts: Navarro 17; Rebs: Vezenkov 6 Asts: Heurtel, Tomić 5 PIR: Heurtel 17	Boxscore	Pts: Gill 21; Rebs: Robinson 8 Asts: Shved 8 PIR: Gill 23	Arena: Palau Blaugrana; Attendance: 6,829; Referees: Damir Javor (SLO), Carmelo Paternicò (ITA), Emin Moğulkoç (TUR)

5 April 2018	Kirolbet Baskonia (Spain)	79–81	(Turkey) Anadolu Efes	Vitoria-Gasteiz
21:00	Scoring by quarter: 18–13, 14–20, 19–27, 28–21
	Pts: Poirier, Shengelia 17; Rebs: Poirier 6 Asts: Granger 11; PIR: Poirier 21	Boxscore	Pts: McCollum 21; Rebs: Demir 4 Asts: McCollum 4 PIR: McCollum 18	Arena: Fernando Buesa Arena; Attendance: 10,311; Referees: Robert Lottermosser (GER), Oļegs Latiševs (LAT), Spiros Gkontas (GRE)

6 April 2018	Olympiacos (Greece)	85–86(OT)	(Lithuania) Žalgiris	Piraeus
18:00	Scoring by quarter: 25–10, 18–21, 16–25, 21–24, Overtime: 5–6
	Pts: Spanoulis 16; Rebs: Milutinov 9 Asts: Spanoulis 6 PIR: Milutinov 26	Boxscore	Pts: Davies 18; Rebs: Davies 6 Asts: Udrih 8 PIR: Davies 24	Arena: Peace and Friendship Stadium; Attendance: 7,176; Referees: Juan Carlos García González (ESP), Matej Boltauzer (SLO), Sérgio Silva (POR)

6 April 2018	Valencia Basket (Spain)	87–84	(Israel) Maccabi Tel Aviv	Valencia
20:30	Scoring by quarter: 24–18, 28–21, 9–18, 26–27
	Pts: Dubljević 15; Rebs: three players 5 Asts: García, Van Rossom 3 PIR: Dubljević 19	Boxscore	Pts: Cole 22; Rebs: Kane, Roll 5 Asts: Cole 5 PIR: Cole 25	Arena: Fuente de San Luis; Attendance: 6,735; Referees: Luigi Lamonica (ITA), Ilija Belošević (SRB), Anne Panther (GER)

6 April 2018	Real Madrid (Spain)	106–86	(Germany) Brose Bamberg	Madrid
21:00	Scoring by quarter: 27–28, 26–22, 29–19, 24–17
	Pts: Randolph 23; Rebs: Ayón 8 Asts: Fernández 6 PIR: Randolph 38	Boxscore	Pts: Hackett 17; Rebs: Musli 8 Asts: Zisis 6 PIR: Musli 21	Arena: WiZink Center; Attendance: 9,468; Referees: Milivoje Jovčić (SRB), Ioannis Foufis (GRE), Amit Balak (ISR)
