= 2020–21 FC Barcelona Bàsquet season =

Spanish basketball club season

FC Barcelona
2020–21 season
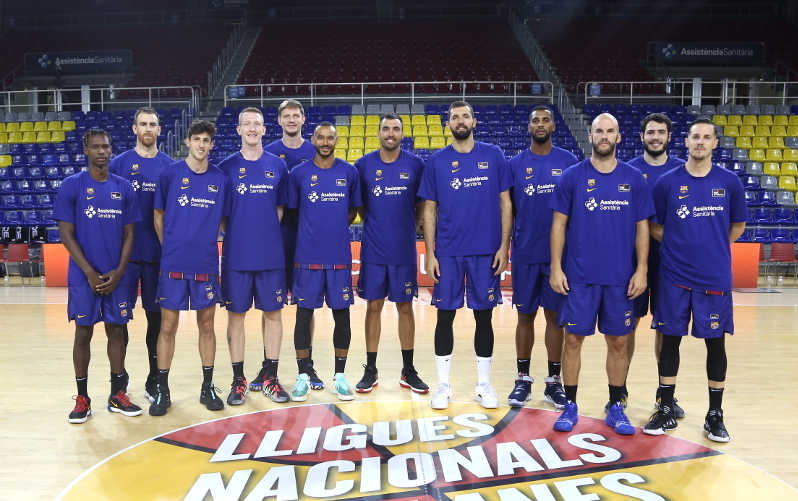
- Barcelona roster in September 2020
- President: Josep Maria Bartomeu; Joan Laporta
- Head coach: Šarūnas Jasikevičius
- Arena: Palau Blaugrana
- Liga ACB: 1st Seed
- Playoffs: Winners
- EuroLeague: 1st Seed
- Playoffs: Runners-up
- Copa del Rey: Winners
- Supercopa: Runners-up
Home	Away

The 2020–21 season was the FC Barcelona's 94th in existence and the club's 56th consecutive season in the top flight of Spanish basketball and the 22nd consecutive season in the EuroLeague. It is the first season under head coach Šarūnas Jasikevičius.

Times up to 24 October 2020 and from 28 March 2021 are CEST (UTC+2). Times from 25 October 2020 to 27 March 2021 are CET (UTC+1).

== Overview ==
=== Pre-season ===
FC Barcelona joined the group of teams that started training camp when players gathered for the first practice on August 8. Coach Šarūnas Jasikevičius gathered his team at the Palau Blaugrana, starting to get ready for the 2020–21 season.

Jasikevičius had seven players available for the beginning of training - Thomas Heurtel, Nick Calathes, Leandro Bolmaro, Sergi Martínez, Rolands Šmits, Aleix Font and Artem Pustovyi. The rest of the players underwent medical tests on August 14 and then join practice. Calathes is one of the few major additions to the team along with Brandon Davies in the first season under Jasikevičius. Barcelona opened its EuroLeague season on October 1 at home against CSKA Moscow.

== Players ==
=== Squad information ===
Note: Flags indicate national team eligibility at FIBA-sanctioned events. Players may hold other non-FIBA nationalities not displayed.

FC Barcelona roster
Players
Coaches

Pos.	No.	Nat.	Name	Ht.	Age
SF	21	(Spain)	Abrines, Álex	1.98 m (6 ft 6 in)	27 – 1 August 1993
SG	9	(Argentina)	Bolmaro, Leandro	1.98 m (6 ft 6 in)	20 – 11 September 2000
PG	99	(Greece)	Calathes, Nick	1.98 m (6 ft 6 in)	32 – 7 February 1989
SF	30	(Spain)	Claver, Víctor	2.07 m (6 ft 9 in)	32 – 30 August 1988
C	0	(Uganda)	Davies, Brandon	2.08 m (6 ft 10 in)	29 – 25 July 1991
C	16	(Spain)	Gasol, Pau	2.16 m (7 ft 1 in)	40 – 6 July 1980
SF	8	(Hungary)	Hanga, Ádám	1.99 m (6 ft 6 in)	32 – 12 April 1989
SG	22	(United States)	Higgins, Cory	1.96 m (6 ft 5 in)	32 – 14 June 1989
SG	24	(Slovakia)	Kuric, Kyle	1.93 m (6 ft 4 in)	31 – 25 August 1989
PF	33	(Spain)	Mirotić, Nikola	2.08 m (6 ft 10 in)	30 – 11 February 1991
PF	18	(Spain)	Oriola, Pierre (C)	2.06 m (6 ft 9 in)	28 – 25 September 1992
C	14	(Ukraine)	Pustovyi, Artem	2.16 m (7 ft 1 in)	28 – 25 June 1992
PF	10	(Latvia)	Šmits, Rolands	2.07 m (6 ft 9 in)	25 – 25 June 1995
PG	2	(France)	Westermann, Léo	1.98 m (6 ft 6 in)	28 – 24 July 1992

Head coach

- (Lithuania) Šarūnas Jasikevičius

Assistant coach(es)

- (Lithuania) Darius Maskoliūnas
- (Lithuania) Tomas Masiulis
- (Spain) David García

Legend

- (C) Team captain
- Injured

- Roster
Updated: June 27, 2021

=== Depth chart ===
Pos.	Starting 5	Bench 1	Bench 2	Bench 3
C	Brandon Davies	Pau Gasol	Pierre Oriola	Artem Pustovyi
PF	Nikola Mirotić	Rolands Šmits		Víctor Claver
SF	Álex Abrines	Ádám Hanga
SG	Cory Higgins	Kyle Kuric
PG	Nick Calathes	Leandro Bolmaro	Léo Westermann

Colours: Blue = homegrown player; Red = non–FIBA Europe player

=== Transactions ===
==== In ====
No.	Pos.	Nat.	Name	Age	Moving from		Type	Ends	Date	Source
99	PG	(Greece)	Nick Calathes	31	Panathinaikos OPAP	(Greece)	Transfer	June 2023	9 July 2020	
2	PG	(France)	Léo Westermann	28	Fenerbahçe Beko	(Turkey)	Transfer	June 2022	6 January 2021	
16	C	(Spain)	Pau Gasol	40	Free agent		Free agency	June 2021	23 February 2021	

==== Out ====
No.	Pos.	Nat.	Name	Age	Moving to		Type	Date	Source
44	C	(Croatia)	Ante Tomić	33	Club Joventut Badalona	(Spain)	End of contract	2 July 2020	
5	SG	(Spain)	Pau Ribas	33	Club Joventut Badalona	(Spain)	Transfer	4 July 2020	
3	PG	(Canada)	Kevin Pangos	27	Zenit Saint Petersburg	(Russia)	End of contract	5 July 2020	
22	SG	(Spain)	Aleix Font	22	Casademont Zaragoza	(Spain)	Transfer	21 August 2020	
13	PG	(France)	Thomas Heurtel	31	Free agent		Contract release	19 January 2021	

== Pre-season and friendlies ==
=== Friendly matches ===
26 August 2020	MoraBanc Andorra	82–90	Barça	Encamp
19:00	Scoring by quarter: 19–18, 22–17, 26–23, 15–32
	Pts: Pálsson 19	Boxscore	Pts: Calathes 15	Arena: Complex Esportiu i Sociocultural d'Encamp; Attendance: 0 Referees: Jordi Aliaga, Arnau Padrós, Alberto Baena

29 August 2020	Barça	89–84	UCAM Murcia	Lleida
18:30	Scoring by quarter: 24–25, 16–16, 18–24, 31–19
	Pts: Calathes 17; Rebs: Martínez 5 Asts: Heurtel 4 PIR: Davies 21	Boxscore	Pts: Frankamp 23; Rebs: Lima 6 Asts: Davis, Frankamp 3 PIR: Frankamp 25	Arena: Pavelló Barris Nord; Attendance: 0 Referees: Òscar Perea, Arnau Padrós, Alberto Baena

30 August 2020	Club Joventut Badalona	68–75	Barça	Badalona
20:00	Scoring by quarter: 20–13, 20–19, 10–28, 18–15
	Pts: Brodziansky 12; Rebs: Tomić 7 Asts: Dimitrijević 4 PIR: Brodziansky 11	Boxscore	Pts: Mirotić 14; Rebs: Mirotić 8 Asts: Heurtel 3 PIR: Mirotić 14	Arena: Palau Municipal d'Esports; Attendance: 0 Referees: Juan de Dios Oyón, Arnau Padrós, Alberto Baena

=== Lliga Catalana ===
4 September 2020	Barça	92–82	Baxi Manresa	Barcelona
21:30	Scoring by quarter: 23–25, 21–16, 24–17, 24–24
	Pts: Oriola 17; Rebs: Oriola 8 Asts: Calathes 11; PIR: Oriola 31	Boxscore	Pts: Martínez, Vaulet 15; Rebs: four players 4 Asts: Pérez 8 PIR: Vaulet 18	Arena: Palau Blaugrana; Attendance: 0 Referees: Jordi Aliaga, Juan de Dios Oyón, Yasmina Alcaraz

6 September 2020	Barça	84–85	MoraBanc Andorra	Barcelona
21:30	Scoring by quarter: 17–15, 23–22, 20–21, 24–27
	Pts: Mirotić 28; Rebs: Bolmaro, Mirotić 5 Asts: Calathes 9 PIR: Mirotić 30	Boxscore	Pts: Senglin 18; Rebs: García 5 Asts: Senglin 6 PIR: Senglin 27	Arena: Palau Blaugrana; Attendance: 0 Referees: José Antonio Martín Bertrán, Óscar Perea, Jordi Aliaga

== Competitions ==
=== Overview ===
Competition	First match	Last match	Starting round	Final position	Record							
Competition	First match	Last match	Starting round	Final position	Pld	W	D	L	PF	PA	PD	Win %
Liga ACB	20 September 2020	15 June 2021	Round 1	Winners	44	38	0	6	3,853	3,209	+644	86.36
EuroLeague	1 October 2020	30 May 2021	Round 1	Runners-up	41	28	0	13	3,280	3,019	+261	68.29
Copa del Rey	12 February 2021	14 February 2021	Quarterfinals	Winners	3	3	0	0	268	234	+34	100.00
Supercopa de España	12 September 2020	13 September 2020	Semifinals	Runners-up	2	1	0	1	139	140	−1	50.00
Total					90	70	0	20	7,540	6,602	+938	77.78

Source: Competitions

=== Liga ACB ===
==== League table ====
Pos	Team	Pld	W	L	PF	PA	PD	Qualification or relegation
1	Real Madrid	36	34	2	3132	2741	+391	Qualification to playoffs
2	Barça	36	32	4	3162	2621	+541	Qualification to playoffs
3	Lenovo Tenerife	36	27	9	3147	2861	+286	Qualification to playoffs
4	Valencia Basket	36	24	12	3107	2917	+190	Qualification to playoffs
5	TD Systems Baskonia	36	23	13	2952	2814	+138	Qualification to playoffs

Source: ACB
Rules for classification: 1) Win–loss record; 2) Head–to–head record; 3) Head–to–head point difference; 4) Point difference; 5) Points scored; 6) Sum of quotients of points scored (Note: Head–to–head record is used only after all the matches between the teams in question have been played)

==== Results summary ====
Overall						Home					Away				
Pld	W	L	PF	PA	PD	W	L	PF	PA	PD	W	L	PF	PA	PD
36	32	4	3162	2621	+541	16	2	1574	1318	+256	16	2	1588	1303	+285

Source: Competitive matches

==== Results by round ====
Round	1	2	3	4	5	6	7	8	9	10	11	12	13	14	15	16	17	18	19	20	21	22	23	24	25	26	27	28	29	30	31	32	33	34	35	36	37	38
Ground	H	A	H	H	R	A	H	A	H	A	H	A	H	A	H	A	H	A	A	H	A	H	A	A	H	H	A	H	A	H	A	H	A	H	R	A	H	A
Result	W	W	W	W	R	L	W	L	W	W	W	W	W	W	W	W	L	W	W	W	W	W	W	W	W	W	W	W	W	L	W	W	W	W	R	W	W	W
Position	8	6	3	2	5	3	3	3	3	3	3	3	3	3	3	3	3	2	2	2	2	2	2	2	2	2	2	2	2	2	2	2	2	2	2	2	2	2

Source: Competitive matches
A = Away; H = Home; W = Win; L = Loss; R = Rest

==== Matches ====
20 September 2020 1	Barça	89–86	Hereda San Pablo Burgos	Barcelona
20:00	Scoring by quarter: 18–23, 27–21, 26–22, 18–20
	Pts: Abrines, Mirotić 22; Rebs: Oriola 11; Asts: Heurtel 8 PIR: Mirotić 35	Boxscore	Pts: Benite 18; Rebs: Horton, Sakho 3 Asts: Cook, Renfroe 6 PIR: Benite 19	Arena: Palau Blaugrana; Attendance: 0 Referees: Daniel Hierrezuelo, Javier Torres, Andrés Fernández

24 September 2020 2	Unicaja	70–79	Barça	Málaga
21:45	Scoring by quarter: 21–16, 17–16, 11–22, 21–25
	Pts: Brizuela 17; Rebs: Abromaitis, Guerrero 6 Asts: Mekel 6 PIR: Mekel 18	Boxscore	Pts: Mirotić 24; Rebs: Mirotić 7 Asts: Heurtel 6 PIR: Mirotić 29	Arena: Martín Carpena; Attendance: 0 Referees: Carlos Cortés, Vicente Bultó, Jacobo Rial

27 September 2020 3	Barça	82–64	RETAbet Bilbao Basket	Barcelona
12:30	Scoring by quarter: 18–17, 21–16, 26–17, 17–14
	Pts: Hanga 13; Rebs: Oriola 6 Asts: Heurtel 7 PIR: Heurtel 22	Boxscore	Pts: Brown 15; Rebs: Balvín, Kingsley 5 Asts: Håkanson 7 PIR: Brown 17	Arena: Palau Blaugrana; Attendance: 0 Referees: Carlos Merino, Raúl Zamorano, Miguel Ángel Pérez

18 October 2020 6	TD Systems Baskonia	82–71	Barça	Vitoria-Gasteiz
18:30	Scoring by quarter: 23–20, 16–20, 31–18, 12–13
	Pts: Giedraitis 19; Rebs: Jekiri 10; Asts: Vildoza 6 PIR: Polonara 26	Boxscore	Pts: Heurtel 15; Rebs: Davies 7 Asts: Calathes 6 PIR: Davies 25	Arena: Buesa Arena; Attendance: 0 Referees: Arnau Padrós, Alberto Sánchez, Juan Carlos García

20 October 2020 4	Barça	87–60	Acunsa GBC	Barcelona
19:00	Scoring by quarter: 26–15, 18–16, 26–18, 17–11
	Pts: Davies, Pustovyi 15; Rebs: Martínez 7 Asts: Bolmaro 10; PIR: Davies 19	Boxscore	Pts: Echenique 17; Rebs: Echenique 7 Asts: Faggiano 4 PIR: Echenique 18	Arena: Palau Blaugrana; Attendance: 0 Referees: Rubén Sánchez, Luis Miguel Castillo, Óscar Perea

25 October 2020 7	Barça	82–71	MoraBanc Andorra	Barcelona
20:00	Scoring by quarter: 19–12, 22–18, 22–24, 19–17
	Pts: Šmits 15; Rebs: Hanga 7 Asts: Calathes 12; PIR: Three players 15	Boxscore	Pts: Three players 10; Rebs: Pérez 7 Asts: García 4 PIR: Pérez 19	Arena: Palau Blaugrana; Attendance: 0 Referees: Jacobo Rial, Vicente Bultó, Daniel Hierrezuelo

30 October 2020 8	UCAM Murcia	77–73	Barça	Murcia
21:15	Scoring by quarter: 29–15, 14–16, 16–18, 18–24
	Pts: Davis 27; Rebs: Radović 9 Asts: Frankamp 5 PIR: Davis 25	Boxscore	Pts: Mirotić 19; Rebs: Abrines, Mirotić 6 Asts: Calathes, Heurtel 3 PIR: Higgins, Mirotić 19	Arena: Palacio de Deportes; Attendance: 0 Referees: Joaquín García, Jorge Martínez, Antonio Conde

1 November 2020 9	Barça	81–74	Iberostar Tenerife	Barcelona
20:00	Scoring by quarter: 19–20, 22–12, 21–20, 19–22
	Pts: Abrines 16; Rebs: Oriola 8 Asts: Heurtel 7 PIR: Abrines 18	Boxscore	Pts: Shermadini 19; Rebs: Shermadini 6 Asts: Huertas 5 PIR: Shermadini 25	Arena: Palau Blaugrana; Attendance: 0 Referees: Vicente Martínez, Rafael Serrano, Miguel Ángel Pérez

8 November 2020 10	Movistar Estudiantes	78–92	Barça	Madrid
18:30	Scoring by quarter: 14–25, 13–23, 25–24, 26–20
	Pts: Brown 19; Rebs: Arteaga 10; Asts: Roberson 6 PIR: Roberson 24	Boxscore	Pts: Pustovyi 18; Rebs: Hanga, Šmits 6 Asts: Heurtel 6 PIR: Pustovyi 23	Arena: WiZink Center; Attendance: 0 Referees: Carlos Peruga, Arnau Padrós, Esperanza Mendoza

14 November 2020 11	Barça	82–53	Coosur Real Betis	Barcelona
20:45	Scoring by quarter: 23–9, 23–13, 18–18, 18–13
	Pts: Mirotić 18; Rebs: Martínez 9 Asts: Calathes 4 PIR: Mirotić 23	Boxscore	Pts: Feldeine 14; Rebs: Ouattara 7 Asts: Campbell 4 PIR: Feldeine 13	Arena: Palau Blaugrana; Attendance: 0 Referees: Vicente Bultó, Alberto Sánchez, Martín Caballero

22 November 2020 12	Casademont Zaragoza	85–97	Barça	Zaragoza
18:30	Scoring by quarter: 24–22, 18–19, 10–29, 33–27
	Pts: Ennis 26; Rebs: Thompson 7 Asts: Thompson 5 PIR: Ennis 22	Boxscore	Pts: Higgins 17; Rebs: Hanga 7 Asts: Calathes 9 PIR: Higgins 20	Arena: Pabellón Príncipe Felipe; Attendance: 0 Referees: Emilio Pérez, Francisco Araña, Fabio Fernández

1 December 2020 17	Barça	90–100	Valencia Basket	Barcelona
21:15	Scoring by quarter: 22–32, 29–19, 19–19, 20–30
	Pts: Mirotić 20; Rebs: Mirotić 9 Asts: Heurtel, Oriola 4 PIR: Mirotić 20	Boxscore	Pts: Williams 25; Rebs: Dubljević, Kalinić 6 Asts: Prepelič 7 PIR: Dubljević 33	Arena: Palau Blaugrana; Attendance: 0 Referees: Juan Carlos García, Luis Miguel Castillo, Vicente Martínez

6 December 2020 13	Barça	91–63	Herbalife Gran Canaria	Barcelona
20:00	Scoring by quarter: 24–12, 29–18, 18–13, 20–20
	Pts: Oriola 14; Rebs: Martínez 9 Asts: Calathes, Heurtel 5 PIR: Higgins 17	Boxscore	Pts: Okoye 11; Rebs: Costello 5 Asts: Costello, Slaughter 3 PIR: Costello 12	Arena: Palau Blaugrana; Attendance: 0 Referees: Óscar Perea, Sergio Manuel, Rubén Sánchez

13 December 2020 14	Monbus Obradoiro	75–78	Barça	Santiago de Compostela
20:00	Scoring by quarter: 22–20, 17–17, 12–24, 24–17
	Pts: Robertson 14; Rebs: Birutis 6 Asts: Pozas 6 PIR: Pozas 18	Boxscore	Pts: Calathes 25; Rebs: Mirotić 9 Asts: Heurtel 3 PIR: Calathes, Mirotić 20	Arena: Multiusos Fontes do Sar; Attendance: 0 Referees: Carlos Peruga, Juan de Dios Oyón, Joaquín García

20 December 2020 15	Barça	88–74	Joventut	Barcelona
18:30	Scoring by quarter: 13–12, 26–17, 33–27, 16–18
	Pts: Hanga 18; Rebs: Oriola 6 Asts: Calathes 7 PIR: Hanga 24	Boxscore	Pts: López-Arostegui 13; Rebs: five players 4 Asts: Ribas 4 PIR: López-Arostegui 15	Arena: Palau Blaugrana; Attendance: 0 Referees: Daniel Hierrezuelo, Martín Caballero, Iyán González

27 December 2020 16	Real Madrid	82–87	Barça	Madrid
21:30	Scoring by quarter: 22–23, 24–23, 19–18, 17–23
	Pts: Llull 14; Rebs: Tavares 11; Asts: Tavares 3 PIR: Tavares 23	Boxscore	Pts: Mirotić 26; Rebs: Mirotić 10; Asts: three players 3 PIR: Mirotić 41	Arena: WiZink Center; Attendance: 0 Referees: Emilio Pérez, Sergio Manuel, Arnau Padrós

3 January 2021 18	Urbas Fuenlabrada	67–83	Barça	Fuenlabrada
18:30	Scoring by quarter: 15–16, 12–14, 20–33, 20–20
	Pts: Eyenga 17; Rebs: Meindl 6 Asts: Samar 4 PIR: Eyenga, Trimble 14	Boxscore	Pts: Higgins 19; Rebs: Higgins, Pustovyi 6 Asts: Calathes 6 PIR: Higgins 33	Arena: Fernando Martín; Attendance: 0 Referees: Jordi Aliaga, Raúl Zamorano, Roberto Lucas

9 January 2021 19	Baxi Manresa	76–99	Barça	Manresa
20:45	Scoring by quarter: 13–22, 25–27, 19–24, 19–26
	Pts: Janning 16; Rebs: Vaulet 11; Asts: Pérez, Tabu 6 PIR: Vaulet 22	Boxscore	Pts: Kuric 25; Rebs: Calathes 6 Asts: Calathes 10; PIR: Calathes 25	Arena: Nou Congost; Attendance: 0 Referees: Fernando Calatrava, Juan de Dios Oyón, Cristóbal Sánchez

24 January 2021 21	Acunsa GBC	68–110	Barça	San Sebastián
17:00	Scoring by quarter: 21–28, 15–34, 16–32, 16–16
	Pts: Radončić 11; Rebs: Olaizola 7 Asts: Oroz; PIR: Radončić 14	Boxscore	Pts: Davies 18; Rebs: Martínez, Pustovyi 6 Asts: Calathes 7 PIR: Davies 21	Arena: Donostia Arena; Attendance: 0 Referees: Carlos Peruga, Francisco Araña, Carlos Merino

31 January 2021 22	Barça	92–63	UCAM Murcia	Barcelona
12:30	Scoring by quarter: 20–11, 17–25, 25–9, 30–18
	Pts: Kuric 15; Rebs: Calathes 5 Asts: Calathes, Higgins 4 PIR: Mirotić 15	Boxscore	Pts: Strawberry 12; Rebs: three players 4 Asts: Lima, Strawberry 2 PIR: Bellas 16	Arena: Palau Blaugrana; Attendance: 0 Referees: Jordi Aliaga, Rafael Serrano, Jacobo Rial

6 February 2021 23	RETAbet Bilbao Basket	73–90	Barça	Bilbao
20:45	Scoring by quarter: 23–25, 16–20, 12–30, 22–15
	Pts: Balvín 14; Rebs: Balvín 4 Asts: Rousselle 4 PIR: Balvín, Huskić 15	Boxscore	Pts: Davies 14; Rebs: Hanga 5 Asts: Westermann 10; PIR: Hanga 17	Arena: Bilbao Arena; Attendance: 0 Referees: Óscar Perea, Martín Caballero, Iyán González

28 February 2021 24	Joventut	62–80	Barça	Badalona
18:30	Scoring by quarter: 12–23, 20–22, 6–20, 24-15
	Pts: Bassas 15; Rebs: Tomić 8 Asts: Ribas 5 PIR: Bassas 19	Boxscore	Pts: Mirotić 21; Rebs: Claver 6 Asts: Higgins 5 PIR: Mirotić 27	Arena: Palau Municipal d'Esports; Attendance: 0 Referees: Miguel Ángel Pérez, Raúl Zamorano, Yasmina Alcaraz

13 March 2021 26	Barça	107–88	Casademont Zaragoza	Barcelona
20:45	Scoring by quarter: 26–26, 29–18, 27–28, 25–16
	Pts: Davies 20; Rebs: Davies 8 Asts: three players 3 PIR: Hanga 28	Boxscore	Pts: Ennis 27; Rebs: Brussino 4 Asts: three players 3 PIR: Ennis 32	Arena: Palau Blaugrana; Referees: Óscar Perea, Alberto Sánchez, Iyán González

16 March 2021 25	Barça	79–55	Unicaja	Barcelona
20:30	Scoring by quarter: 23–13, 17–19, 20–19, 19–4
	Pts: Davies 15; Rebs: Mirotić, Oriola 6 Asts: Calathes 4 PIR: Davies 18	Boxscore	Pts: Thompson 11; Rebs: Nzosa 8 Asts: four players 1 PIR: Thompson 14	Arena: Palau Blaugrana; Attendance: 0 Referees: Fernando Calatrava, Arnau Padrós, Roberto Lucas

21 March 2021 27	Valencia Basket	64–80	Barça	Valencia
18:30	Scoring by quarter: 14–17, 15–24, 18–17, 17–22
	Pts: Tobey 13; Rebs: Pradilla, Tobey 5 Asts: Prepelič 8 PIR: Tobey 20	Boxscore	Pts: Abrines 23; Rebs: Abrines, Mirotić 5 Asts: Calathes 8 PIR: Abrines 28	Arena: La Fonteta; Attendance: 0 Referees: Carlos Peruga, Javier Torres, Alberto Baena

23 March 2021 20	Barça	98–68	Movistar Estudiantes	Barcelona
20:30	Scoring by quarter: 33–15, 31–24, 13–8, 2121
	Pts: Mirotić 18; Rebs: Pustovyi 8 Asts: Calathes 3 PIR: Kuric 19	Boxscore	Pts: Avramović 14; Rebs: Delgado 5 Asts: Barea 5 PIR: Roberson 15	Arena: Palau Blaugrana; Attendance: 0

28 March 2021 28	Barça	81–79	Urbas Fuenlabrada	Barcelona
12:30	Scoring by quarter: 20–17, 11–18, 25–24, 25–20
	Pts: Davies 23; Rebs: Calathes 8 Asts: Calathes 6 PIR: Davies 27	Boxscore	Pts: Trimble 17; Rebs: Meindl 11; Asts: Novak 5 PIR: Alexander, Meindl 16	Arena: Palau Blaugrana; Attendance: 0 Referees: Carlos Cortés, Sergio Manuel, Fabio Fernández

4 April 2021 29	Hereda San Pablo Burgos	77–93	Barça	Burgos
18:30	Scoring by quarter: 15–13, 17–19, 20–35, 25–26
	Pts: Renfroe 13; Rebs: Rivero 6 Asts: Cook 7 PIR: Renfroe 16	Boxscore	Pts: Kuric 24; Rebs: Oriola, Šmits 7 Asts: Calathes 12; PIR: Mirotić 24	Arena: Coliseum Burgos; Referees: Emilio Pérez, Rafael Serrano, Yasmina Alcaraz

11 April 2021 30	Barça	85–87	Real Madrid	Barcelona
18:30	Scoring by quarter: 15–20, 18–22, 24–17, 28–28
	Pts: Higgins 21; Rebs: Hanga 5 Asts: Calathes 4 PIR: Calathes 23	Boxscore	Pts: Fernández 13; Rebs: Garuba 5 Asts: Laprovíttola 5 PIR: Fernández, Garuba 14	Arena: Palau Blaugrana; Attendance: 0 Referees: Antonio Conde, Juan de Dios Oyón, Martín Caballero

14 April 2021 31	Herbalife Gran Canaria	74–92	Barça	Las Palmas
21:15	Scoring by quarter: 17–31, 20–22, 19–21, 18–18
	Pts: Kilpatrick 14; Rebs: Costello 6 Asts: Slaughter 4 PIR: Slaughter 14	Boxscore	Pts: Mirotić 26; Rebs: Gasol, Mirotić 5 Asts: Hanga 8 PIR: Mirotić 26	Arena: Gran Canaria Arena; Attendance: 0 Referees: Fernando Calatrava, Luis Miguel Castillo, Alfonso Olivares

17 April 2021 32	Barça	97–89	Baxi Manresa	Barcelona
18:00	Scoring by quarter: 24–24, 29–27, 28–17, 16–21
	Pts: Davies 21; Rebs: Davies 4 Asts: Calathes 7 PIR: Davies 27	Boxscore	Pts: Eatherton 23; Rebs: Hinrichs 8 Asts: Ferrari 5 PIR: Hinrichs 21	Arena: Palau Blaugrana; Attendance: 0 Referees: Jordi Aliaga, Jorge Martínez, David Sánchez

25 April 2021 33	MoraBanc Andorra	63–79	Barça	Andorra la Vella
12:30	Scoring by quarter: 23–26, 14–18, 18–10, 8–25
	Pts: Hannah 18; Rebs: Olumuyiwa, Paulí 4 Asts: Hannah 6 PIR: Hannah 23	Boxscore	Pts: Bolmaro 26; Rebs: Gasol 8 Asts: Westermann 7 PIR: Bolmaro 32	Arena: M.I. Govern Andorra; Attendance: 0 Referees: Emilio Pérez, Alberto Sánchez, Iyán González

6 May 2021 34	Barça	76–70	Monbus Obradoiro	Barcelona
21:00	Scoring by quarter: 18–17, 18–11, 21–20, 19–22
	Pts: Westermann 14; Rebs: Mirotić 9 Asts: Calathes 4 PIR: Abrines, Gasol 19	Boxscore	Pts: Enoch 17; Rebs: Enoch 8 Asts: Oliver 4 PIR: Enoch 18	Arena: Palau Blaugrana; Attendance: 0 Referees: Fernando Calatrava, Javier Torres, Yasmina Alcaraz

9 May 2021 36	Coosur Real Betis	58–109	Barça	Seville
12:30	Scoring by quarter: 21–21, 4–33, 22–23, 11–32
	Pts: Jordan 16; Rebs: Spires 4 Asts: Campbell 5 PIR: Jordan 23	Boxscore	Pts: Abrines 20; Rebs: four players 4 Asts: Calathes 5 PIR: Abrines 24	Arena: San Pablo; Attendance: 0 Referees: Jordi Aliaga, Raúl Zamorano, David Sánchez

19 May 2021 37	Barça	87–74	TD Systems Baskonia	Barcelona
21:15	Scoring by quarter: 21–21, 20–18, 24–19, 22–16
	Pts: Bolmaro 18; Rebs: Bolmaro, Davies 5 Asts: Bolmaro, Higgins 4 PIR: Bolmaro 17	Boxscore	Pts: Giedraitis 14; Rebs: Jekiri 10; Asts: Colom, Massenat 3 PIR: Sedekerskis 16	Arena: Palau Blaugrana; Attendance: 0 Referees: Óscar Perea, Luis Miguel Castillo, Vicente Martínez

22 May 2021 38	Lenovo Tenerife	72–96	Barça	San Cristóbal de La Laguna
20:45	Scoring by quarter: 17–20, 13–17, 26–28, 16–31
	Pts: Huertas 14; Rebs: three players 5 Asts: Fitipaldo 6 PIR: Fitipaldo 15	Boxscore	Pts: Davies 16; Rebs: Davies, Gasol 5 Asts: Calathes, Higgins 4 PIR: Davies 21	Arena: Santiago Martín; Attendance: 0 Referees: Juan Carlos García, Francisco Araña, Cristóbal Sánchez

==== ACB Playoffs ====
Win Loss

===== Quarterfinals =====
1 June 2021 1	Barça	84–74	Joventut	Barcelona
22:00	Scoring by quarter: 26–18, 14–20, 20–12, 24–24
	Pts: Bolmaro 16; Rebs: Gasol 6 Asts: Bolmaro, Hanga 4 PIR: Gasol 18	Boxscore	Pts: Tomić 17; Rebs: Tomić 8 Asts: Dimitrijević 3 PIR: Brodziansky 19	Arena: Palau Blaugrana; Attendance: 0 Referees: Óscar Perea, Martín Caballero, Cristóbal Sánchez

3 June 2020 2	Joventut	72–63	Barça	Badalona
22:00	Scoring by quarter: 23–13, 8–14, 18–17, 23–19
	Pts: Bassas 20; Rebs: Parra 7 Asts: Tomić 7 PIR: Bassas 19	Boxscore	Pts: Higgins 13; Rebs: Davies 8 Asts: Higgins 5 PIR: Mirotić 19	Arena: Palau Municipal d'Esports; Attendance: 1,000; Referees: Juan Carlos García, Vicente Bultó, Alfonso Olivares

5 June 2020 3	Barça	94–73	Joventut	Barcelona
18:30	Scoring by quarter: 25–21, 20–17, 37–14, 12–21
	Pts: Kuric 22; Rebs: Abrines 7 Asts: Davies, Higgins 3 PIR: Kuric 24	Boxscore	Pts: Brodziansky 11; Rebs: Ventura, Tomić 5 Asts: Dimitrijević 6 PIR: Tomić 23	Arena: Palau Blaugrana; Attendance: 1,000; Referees: Antonio Conde, Fernando Calatrava, Arnau Padrós

===== Semifinals =====
7 June 2021 1	Barça	112–69	Lenovo Tenerife	Barcelona
21:15	Scoring by quarter: 18–18, 25–18, 40–18, 29–15
	Pts: Mirotić 21; Rebs: Abrines 6 Asts: Calathes 7 PIR: Mirotić 23	Boxscore	Pts: Guerra 14; Rebs: Shermadini 4 Asts: Fitipaldo 7 PIR: Guerra 12	Arena: Palau Blaugrana; Attendance: 1,000; Referees: Juan Carlos García, Fernando Calatrava, Martín Caballero

9 June 2021 2	Lenovo Tenerife	80–68	Barça	San Cristóbal de La Laguna
21:15	Scoring by quarter: 15–19, 23–16, 20–20, 22–13
	Pts: Huertas 26; Rebs: Shermadini 10; Asts: Huertas 11; PIR: Shermadini 37	Boxscore	Pts: Gasol 15; Rebs: Mirotić 9 Asts: Calathes 4 PIR: Gasol 21	Arena: Santiago Martín; Referees: Emilio Pérez, Antonio Conde, Sergio Manuel

11 June 2021 3	Barça	89–72	Lenovo Tenerife	Barcelona
22:00	Scoring by quarter: 23–21, 23–18, 22–11, 21–22
	Pts: Gasol 15; Rebs: Gasol 5 Asts: Mirotić 4 PIR: Gasol 24	Boxscore	Pts: Doornekamp 19; Rebs: Doornekamp 5 Asts: Huertas 9 PIR: Doornekamp 22	Arena: Palau Blaugrana; Attendance: 1,000; Referees: Emilio Pérez, Fernando Calatrava, Luis Miguel Castillo

==== Finals ====
13 June 2021 1	Real Madrid	75–89	Barça	Madrid
18:30	Scoring by quarter: 20–15, 16–18, 16–29, 23–27
	Pts: Tavares 16; Rebs: Tavares 11; Asts: Llull 3 PIR: Tavares 26	Boxscore	Pts: Higgins 26; Rebs: Gasol 8 Asts: Calathes 4 PIR: Higgins 26	Arena: WiZink Center; Attendance: 1,000; Referees: Carlos Peruga, Jordi Aliaga, Martín Caballero

15 June 2021 2	Barça	92–73	Real Madrid	Barcelona
22:00	Scoring by quarter: 26–15, 22–15, 29–25, 15–18
	Pts: Mirotić 27; Rebs: Šmits, Gasol 6 Asts: Calathes 7 PIR: Mirotić 35	Boxscore	Pts: Abalde 15; Rebs: Tavares 6 Asts: Alocén 5 PIR: Abalde 21	Arena: Palau Blaugrana; Attendance: 1,000; Referees: Antonio Conde, Emilio Pérez, Luis Miguel Castillo

=== EuroLeague ===
==== League table ====
Pos	Team	Pld	W	L	PF	PA	PD	Qualification
1	(Spain) Barcelona	34	24	10	2706	2469	+237	Qualification to playoffs
2	(Russia) CSKA Moscow	34	24	10	2817	2662	+155	Qualification to playoffs
3	(Turkey) Anadolu Efes	34	22	12	2838	2604	+234	Qualification to playoffs
4	(Italy) A|X Armani Exchange Milan	34	21	13	2720	2599	+121	Qualification to playoffs
5	(Germany) Bayern Munich	34	21	13	2633	2599	+34	Qualification to playoffs

Source: EuroLeague
Rules for classification: All points scored in extra period(s) will not be counted in the standings, nor for any tie-break situation.

==== Results summary ====
Overall						Home					Away				
Pld	W	L	PF	PA	PD	W	L	PF	PA	PD	W	L	PF	PA	PD
34	24	10	2742	2500	+242	12	5	1392	1239	+153	12	5	1350	1261	+89

Last updated: 10 April 2021.
Source: Competitive matches

==== Results by round ====
Round	1	2	3	4	5	6	7	8	9	10	11	12	13	14	15	16	17	18	19	20	21	22	23	24	25	26	27	28	29	30	31	32	33	34
Ground	H	A	A	H	H	A	A	H	H	H	A	A	H	H	H	A	A	H	A	A	A	H	A	H	H	H	A	H	A	A	H	A	A	H
Result	W	L	W	W	W	W	W	W	L	W	L	W	W	W	L	L	L	W	W	W	W	W	W	L	W	L	W	W	W	W	W	L	W	L
Position	3	7	7	5	3	2	1	1	1	1	1	1	1	1	2	2	3	2	2	2	1	1	1	1	1	1	1	1	1	1	1	1	1	1

Source: Competitive matches
A = Away; H = Home; W = Win; L = Loss

==== Matches ====
1 October 2020 1	Barcelona (Spain)	76–66	(Russia) CSKA Moscow	Barcelona
21:00	Scoring by quarter: 24–14, 17–19, 14–15, 21–18
	Pts: Davies 18; Rebs: Abrines, Mirotić 7 Asts: Calathes 7 PIR: Abrines 22	Boxscore	Pts: Shengelia 15; Rebs: Shengelia 5 Asts: James 4 PIR: Shengelia 20	Arena: Palau Blaugrana; Attendance: 0 Referees: Christos Christodoulou, Damir Javor, Michele Rossi

9 October 2020 2	Zenit Saint Petersburg (Russia)	74–70	(Spain) Barcelona	Saint Petersburg
19:00	Scoring by quarter: 16–19, 19–19, 19–17, 20–15
	Pts: Baron, Poythress 16; Rebs: Poythress 11; Asts: Ponitka, Thomas 3 PIR: Poythress 22	Boxscore	Pts: Mirotić 14; Rebs: Mirotić 7 Asts: Calathes 5 PIR: Mirotić 22	Arena: Yubileyny Sports Palace; Attendance: 2,776; Referees: Sreten Radović, Artem Lavrukhin

13 October 2020 3	Valencia Basket (Spain)	66–71	(Spain) Barcelona	Valencia
21:00	Scoring by quarter: 19–16, 16–17, 9–21, 22–17
	Pts: Dubljević, Kalinić 13; Rebs: Dubljević, Labeyrie 8 Asts: Prepelič 5 PIR: Dubljević 20	Boxscore	Pts: Šmits 15; Rebs: Šmits 7 Asts: Hanga 6 PIR: Šmits 23	Arena: La Fonteta; Attendance: 400; Referees: Christos Christodoulou, Mario Majkić, Jurgis Laurinavičius

15 October 2020 4	Barcelona (Spain)	97–89(OT)	(Greece) Panathinaikos OPAP	Barcelona
21:00	Scoring by quarter: 13–18, 23–17, 22–23, 17–17, Overtime: 22–14
	Pts: Higgins 24; Rebs: Higgins 7 Asts: Calathes 6 PIR: Higgins 26	Boxscore	Pts: Foster 24; Rebs: Mitoglou 12; Asts: Sant-Roos 5 PIR: Mitoglou 28	Arena: Palau Blaugrana; Attendance: 0 Referees: Luigi Lamonica, Oļegs Latiševs, Gytis Vilius

23 October 2020 5	Barcelona (Spain)	79–72	(Spain) Real Madrid	Barcelona
21:00	Scoring by quarter: 18–14, 30–13, 16–25, 15–20
	Pts: Kuric 15; Rebs: Martínez 9 Asts: Calathes 7 PIR: Davies 21	Boxscore	Pts: Thompkins 14; Rebs: Thompkins 7 Asts: Campazzo 6 PIR: Thompkins 23	Arena: Palau Blaugrana; Attendance: 0 Referees: Christos Christodoulou, Mehdi Diffalah, Milan Nedović

30 October 2020 6	TD Systems Baskonia (Spain)	71–72	(Spain) Barcelona	Vitoria-Gasteiz
20:30	Scoring by quarter: 19–20, 18–19, 19–19, 15–14
	Pts: Dragić 15; Rebs: Henry 8 Asts: Henry 7 PIR: Polonara 20	Boxscore	Pts: Mirotić 18; Rebs: Mirotić, Oriola 7 Asts: Calathes 6 PIR: Mirotić 27	Arena: Buesa Arena; Attendance: 0 Referees: Luigi Lamonica, Uroš Nikolić, Sašo Petek

5 November 2020 7	ALBA Berlin (Germany)	67–103	(Spain) Barcelona	Berlin
19:00	Scoring by quarter: 18–30, 18–26, 15–23, 16–24
	Pts: Fontecchio 17; Rebs: Sikma 6 Asts: Sikma 6 PIR: Sikma 18	Boxscore	Pts: Mirotić 18; Rebs: Šmits 8 Asts: Calathes 12; PIR: Mirotić 25	Arena: Mercedes-Benz Arena; Attendance: 0 Referees: Ilija Belošević, Emin Moğulkoç, Petri Mäntylä

12 November 2020 8	Barcelona (Spain)	97–55	(Turkey) Fenerbahçe Beko	Barcelona
21:00	Scoring by quarter: 28–17, 23–12, 18–9, 28–17
	Pts: Kuric 25; Rebs: Mirotić 8 Asts: Calathes, Heurtel 8 PIR: Mirotić, Šmits 23	Boxscore	Pts: Brown 10; Rebs: Düverioğlu 4 Asts: Westermann 5 PIR: Brown 10	Arena: Palau Blaugrana; Attendance: 0 Referees: Oļegs Latiševs, Tomislav Hordov, Tomasz Trawicki

20 November 2020 10	Barcelona (Spain)	76–65	(Serbia) Crvena zvezda mts	Barcelona
21:00	Scoring by quarter: 19–6, 20–16, 22–22, 15–21
	Pts: Mirotić 23; Rebs: Oriola 5 Asts: Calathes 8 PIR: Mirotić 31	Boxscore	Pts: Davidovac 12; Rebs: Terry 6 Asts: Rochestie 5 PIR: Terry 13	Arena: Palau Blaugrana; Attendance: 0 Referees: Luigi Lamonica, Anne Panther, Gytis Vilius

27 November 2020 11	LDLC ASVEL (France)	80–68	(Spain) Barcelona	Villeurbanne
20:45	Scoring by quarter: 25–19, 20–17, 20–17, 15–15
	Pts: Lighty 17; Rebs: four players 4 Asts: Cole 4 PIR: Lighty 23	Boxscore	Pts: Mirotić 14; Rebs: Mirotić 9 Asts: Davies 4 PIR: Mirotić 24	Arena: Astroballe; Attendance: 0 Referees: Robert Lottermoser, Fernando Rocha, Eduard Udyanskyy

4 December 2020 12	Žalgiris (Lithuania)	63–72	(Spain) Barcelona	Kaunas
19:00	Scoring by quarter: 14–17, 19–22, 15–16, 14–18
	Pts: Jokubaitis 15; Rebs: Hayes 6 Asts: Hayes, Walkup 4 PIR: Hayes 18	Boxscore	Pts: Davies 16; Rebs: Calathes 5 Asts: Calathes 10; PIR: Davies 21	Arena: Žalgirio Arena; Attendance: 0 Referees: Saša Pukl, Tomislav Hordov, Michele Rossi

8 December 2020 9	Barcelona (Spain)	88–96	(Greece) Olympiacos	Barcelona
19:00	Scoring by quarter: 17–26, 30–25, 16–21, 25–24
	Pts: Mirotić 16; Rebs: Davies 6 Asts: Higgins 5 PIR: Mirotić 19	Boxscore	Pts: Martin 17; Rebs: Martin 8 Asts: Sloukas 10; PIR: Sloukas 23	Arena: Palau Blaugrana; Attendance: 0 Referees: Saša Pukl, Milivoje Jovčić, Fernando Rocha

11 December 2020 13	Barcelona (Spain)	87–71	(Italy) A|X Armani Exchange Milan	Barcelona
21:00	Scoring by quarter: 23–15, 16–28, 21–18, 27–10
	Pts: Davies 21; Rebs: Mirotić 10; Asts: Calathes 14; PIR: Mirotić 29	Boxscore	Pts: Delaney 23; Rebs: Brooks 6 Asts: Delaney 4 PIR: Delaney 22	Arena: Palau Blaugrana; Attendance: 0 Referees: Robert Lottermoser, Oļegs Latiševs, Sašo Petek

16 December 2020 14	Barcelona (Spain)	87–74	(Russia) Khimki	Barcelona
19:00	Scoring by quarter: 32–25, 19–16, 18–12, 18–21
	Pts: Mirotić 24; Rebs: Abrines, Mirotić 4 Asts: Calathes 12; PIR: Mirotić 34	Boxscore	Pts: Shved 22; Rebs: Shved 9 Asts: Shved 6 PIR: Shved 26	Arena: Palau Blaugrana; Attendance: 0 Referees: Luigi Lamonica, Mehdi Difallah, Anne Panther

18 December 2020 15	Barcelona (Spain)	67–68	(Israel) Maccabi Tel Aviv	Barcelona
21:00	Scoring by quarter: 12–17, 20–13, 22–23, 13–15
	Pts: Higgins 16; Rebs: Mirotić 10; Asts: Calathes 4 PIR: Mirotić 20	Boxscore	Pts: Bender 15; Rebs: Caloiaro 7 Asts: Wilbekin 6 PIR: Wilbekin 14	Arena: Palau Blaugrana; Attendance: 0 Referees: Ilija Belošević, Matej Boltauzer, Robert Vyklický

22 December 2020 16	Anadolu Efes (Turkey)	86–79	(Spain) Barcelona	Istanbul
18:30	Scoring by quarter: 18–24, 25–19, 25–11, 18–25
	Pts: Larkin 23; Rebs: Larkin, Moerman 7 Asts: Larkin 8 PIR: Larkin 37	Boxscore	Pts: Mirotić 18; Rebs: Mirotić 8 Asts: Calathes 6 PIR: Mirotić 24	Arena: Sinan Erdem Dome; Attendance: 0 Referees: Robert Lottermoser, Damir Javor, Miloš Koljenšić

30 December 2020 17	Bayern Munich (Germany)	90–77	(Spain) Barcelona	Munich
19:30	Scoring by quarter: 22–26, 21–19, 27–10, 20–22
	Pts: Baldwin 29; Rebs: Reynolds 8 Asts: Baldwin 7 PIR: Baldwin 41	Boxscore	Pts: Abrines 16; Rebs: Abrines, Calathes 5 Asts: Calathes 8 PIR: Abrines 14	Arena: Audi Dome; Attendance: 0 Referees: Christos Christodoulou, Sreten Radović, Amit Balak

7 January 2021 18	Barcelona (Spain)	89–72	(Spain) Valencia Basket	Barcelona
21:00	Scoring by quarter: 18–12, 20–21, 29–21, 22–18
	Pts: Abrines 16; Rebs: Martínez 8 Asts: Calathes 7 PIR: Abrines 18	Boxscore	Pts: Labeyrie 17; Rebs: Tobey 10; Asts: three players 3 PIR: Tobey 22	Arena: Palau Blaugrana; Attendance: 0 Referees: Carmelo Paternicò, Sérgio Silva, Uroš Nikolić

12 January 2021 19	Khimki (Russia)	75–87	(Spain) Barcelona	Khimki
18:00	Scoring by quarter: 26–26, 22–28, 12–19, 15–14
	Pts: Shved 23; Rebs: Booker 5 Asts: Shved 6 PIR: Shved 20	Boxscore	Pts: Higgins, Kuric 18; Rebs: Oriola 10; Asts: Calathes 15; PIR: Higgins 28	Arena: Mytishchi Arena; Attendance: 0 Referees: Borys Ryzhyk, Tomislav Hordov, Robert Vyklický

15 January 2021 20	CSKA Moscow (Russia)	75–88	(Spain) Barcelona	Moscow
18:00	Scoring by quarter: 25–20, 16–22, 15–22, 19–24
	Pts: James 18; Rebs: Hilliard 9 Asts: James, Strēlnieks 4 PIR: Milutinov 23	Boxscore	Pts: Higgins 25; Rebs: three players 6 Asts: Calathes 7 PIR: Higgins 28	Arena: Megasport Arena; Attendance: 3,125; Referees: Matej Boltauzer, Mehdi Difallah, Fernando Rocha

22 January 2021 21	Crvena zvezda mts (Serbia)	60–72	(Spain) Barcelona	Belgrade
19:00	Scoring by quarter: 11–21, 20–14, 14–22, 15–15
	Pts: Dobrić 11; Rebs: O'Bryant 8 Asts: Colom 4 PIR: Davidovac, Walden 11	Boxscore	Pts: Higgins 14; Rebs: Mirotić 8 Asts: Calathes 5 PIR: Calathes, Oriola 17	Arena: Aleksandar Nikolić Hall; Attendance: 0 Referees: Robert Lottermoser, Marcin Kowalski, Michele Rossi

26 January 2021 22	Barcelona (Spain)	85–81	(Russia) Zenit Saint Petersburg	Barcelona
21:00	Scoring by quarter: 16–14, 28–19, 25–17, 16–31
	Pts: Davies 18; Rebs: Calathes, Oriola 7 Asts: Calathes 12; PIR: Calathes, Kuric 21	Boxscore	Pts: Gudaitis, Zubkov 15; Rebs: Ponitka 8 Asts: Pangos, Ponitka 5 PIR: Gudaitis 21	Arena: Palau Blaugrana; Attendance: 0 Referees: Sreten Radović, Gytis Vilius, Emin Moğulkoç

28 January 2021 23	Olympiacos (Greece)	74–76	(Spain) Barcelona	Piraeus
20:00	Scoring by quarter: 12–21, 18–19, 23–10, 21–26
	Pts: McKissic 18; Rebs: Ellis 13; Asts: Sloukas 5 PIR: Spanoulis 13	Boxscore	Pts: Mirotić 16; Rebs: Mirotić 5 Asts: Calathes 7 PIR: Oriola 17	Arena: Peace and Friendship Stadium; Attendance: 0 Referees: Damir Javor, Milivoje Jovčić, Tomasz Trawicki

4 February 2021 24	Barcelona (Spain)	86–88	(Turkey) Anadolu Efes	Barcelona
21:00	Scoring by quarter: 22–27, 28–26, 15–19, 21–16
	Pts: Mirotić 24; Rebs: Davies 7 Asts: Calathes 5 PIR: Mirotić 25	Boxscore	Pts: Micić 26; Rebs: Şanlı 8 Asts: Micić 5 PIR: Micić 30	Arena: Palau Blaugrana; Attendance: 0 Referees: Ilija Belošević, Carmelo Paternicò, Milan Nedović

18 February 2021 25	Barcelona (Spain)	86–62	(Lithuania) Žalgiris	Barcelona
21:00	Scoring by quarter: 24–24, 24–13, 23–10, 15–15
	Pts: Higgins, Oriola 19; Rebs: Oriola 7 Asts: Bolmaro 6 PIR: Higgins, Oriola 27	Boxscore	Pts: Hayes 9 Rebs: Rubit 7 Asts: Grigonis, Walkup 4 PIR: Grigonis 10	Arena: Palau Blaugrana; Attendance: 0 Referees: Borys Ryzhyk, Piotr Pastusiak, Sérgio Silva

26 February 2021 26	Barcelona (Spain)	69–76	(France) LDLC ASVEL	Barcelona
21:00	Scoring by quarter: 15–19, 20–15, 19–20, 15–22
	Pts: Davies 22; Rebs: Davies 8 Asts: Calathes 5 PIR: Davies 29	Boxscore	Pts: Cole 21; Rebs: Howard, Yabusele 8 Asts: Cole 4 PIR: Howard 21	Arena: Palau Blaugrana; Attendance: 0 Referees: Robert Lottermoser, Uroš Nikolić, Michele Rossi

2 March 2021 27	Panathinaikos OPAP (Greece)	77–85	(Spain) Barcelona	Athens
20:00	Scoring by quarter: 17–26, 22–21, 11–12, 27–26
	Pts: Hezonja 21; Rebs: Papagiannis 5 Asts: Bentil 4 PIR: Hezonja 20	Boxscore	Pts: Mirotić 25; Rebs: Mirotić 5 Asts: three players 4 PIR: Mirotić 27	Arena: O.A.K.A. Attendance: 0 Referees: Matej Boltauzer, Anne Panther, Emin Moğulkoç

5 March 2021 28	Barcelona (Spain)	71–57	(Spain) TD Systems Baskonia	Barcelona
21:00	Scoring by quarter: 25–4, 8–22, 17–19, 21–12
	Pts: Mirotić 18; Rebs: Mirotić 10; Asts: Calathes, Higgins 4 PIR: Mirotić 26	Boxscore	Pts: Fall 12; Rebs: Jekiri, Polonara 6 Asts: Henry 8 PIR: Polonara 14	Arena: Palau Blaugrana; Attendance: 0 Referees: Luigi Lamonica, Sreten Radović, Mario Majkić

11 March 2021 29	Real Madrid (Spain)	76–81	(Spain) Barcelona	Madrid
21:00	Scoring by quarter: 19–24, 19–17, 16–16, 22–24
	Pts: Deck 17; Rebs: Tavares 11; Asts: Abalde 4 PIR: Tavares 29	Boxscore	Pts: Oriola 18; Rebs: Oriola 6 Asts: Higgins, Mirotić 5 PIR: Mirotić 24	Arena: WiZink Center; Attendance: 0 Referees: Borys Ryzhyk, Carmelo Paternicò, Sašo Petek

19 March 2021 30	A|X Armani Exchange Milan (Italy)	56–72	(Spain) Barcelona	Milan
20:45	Scoring by quarter: 12–15, 17–23, 15–17, 12–17
	Pts: Shields 10; Rebs: Brooks 5 Asts: Rodríguez 5 PIR: Shields 10	Boxscore	Pts: Mirotić 15; Rebs: Oriola 7 Asts: Calathes 11; PIR: Mirotić 22	Arena: Mediolanum Forum; Attendance: 0 Referees: Ilija Belošević, Damir Javor, Tomislav Hordov

26 March 2021 31	Barcelona (Spain)	80–67	(Germany) ALBA Berlin	Barcelona
21:00	Scoring by quarter: 22–23, 23–17, 17–18, 18–9
	Pts: Mirotić 26; Rebs: Mirotić 7 Asts: Calathes 11; PIR: Mirotić 28	Boxscore	Pts: Sikma 9 Rebs: Sikma 6 Asts: Granger 3 PIR: Giffey 14	Arena: Palau Blaugrana; Attendance: 0 Referees: Oļegs Latiševs, Joseph Bissang, Luka Kardum

30 March 2021 32	Maccabi Tel Aviv (Israel)	99–94(OT)	(Spain) Barcelona	Tel Aviv
20:05	Scoring by quarter: 19–14, 20–24, 26–21, 15–21, Overtime: 19–14
	Pts: Žižić 24; Rebs: Žižić 8 Asts: Jones 8 PIR: Žižić 33	Boxscore	Pts: Mirotić 23; Rebs: Mirotić 10; Asts: Calathes 5 PIR: Mirotić 34	Arena: Menora Mivtachim Arena; Attendance: 3000; Referees: Matej Boltauzer, Mehdi Diffalah, Fernando Rocha

2 April 2021 33	Fenerbahçe Beko (Turkey)	73–82	(Spain) Barcelona	Istanbul
19:45	Scoring by quarter: 25–26, 17–21, 16–15, 15–20
	Pts: Gudurić 19; Rebs: Barthel 6 Asts: De Colo 6 PIR: Gudurić 21	Boxscore	Pts: Kuric 16; Rebs: Davies 9 Asts: three players 4 PIR: Kuric 18	Arena: Ülker Sports and Event Hall; Attendance: 0 Referees: Robert LottermoserElias Koromilas, Rain Peerandi

9 April 2021 34	Barcelona (Spain)	72–82	(Germany) Bayern Munich	Barcelona
21:00	Scoring by quarter: 22–29, 15–14, 18–17, 17–22
	Pts: Bolmaro, Westermann 12; Rebs: Gasol, Hanga 4 Asts: Calathes 5 PIR: Davies 17	Boxscore	Pts: Reynolds 26; Rebs: three players Asts: Baldwin, Šiško 6 PIR: Reynolds 26	Arena: Palau Blaugrana; Attendance: 0 Referees: Christos Christodoulou, Damir Javor, Tomasz Trawicki

==== Quarterfinals ====
Win Loss

21 April 2021 1	Barcelona (Spain)	74–76	(Russia) Zenit Saint Petersburg	Barcelona
21:00	Scoring by quarter: 21–21, 13–27, 20–13, 20–15
	Pts: Davies 18; Rebs: Davies 9 Asts: Higgins 6 PIR: Davies 25	Boxscore	Pts: Pangos 19; Rebs: Black 6 Asts: Pangos 9 PIR: Pangos 33	Arena: Palau Blaugrana; Attendance: 0 Referees: Robert Lottermoser, Emin Moğulkoç, Milan Nedović

23 April 2021 2	Barcelona (Spain)	81–78(OT)	(Russia) Zenit Saint Petersburg	Barcelona
21:00	Scoring by quarter: 13–16, 25–13, 10–19, 18–18, Overtime: 15–12
	Pts: Davies 22; Rebs: Davies 8 Asts: Calathes 4 PIR: Davies 33	Boxscore	Pts: Pangos 23; Rebs: Black 7 Asts: Pangos, Rivers 3 PIR: Pangos 19	Arena: Palau Blaugrana; Attendance: 0 Referees: Luigi Lamonica, Damir Javor, Anne Panther

28 April 2021 3	Zenit Saint Petersburg (Russia)	70–78	(Spain) Barcelona	Saint Petersburg
19:00	Scoring by quarter: 16-16, 17-18, 18-21, 19-23
	Pts: Baron 19; Rebs: Thomas 9 Asts: Pangos 6 PIR: Thomas 21	Boxscore	Pts: Davies 22; Rebs: Davies 8 Asts: Calathes 6 PIR: Davies 28	Arena: Yubileyny Sports Palace; Attendance: 5,178; Referees: Matej Boltauzer, Tomislav Hordov, Uros Nikolic

30 April 2021 4	Zenit Saint Petersburg (Russia)	74–61	(Spain) Barcelona	Saint Petersburg
19:00	Scoring by quarter: 25-13, 11-13, 22-12, 16-23
	Pts: Pangos 22; Rebs: Thomas 9 Asts: Pangos 8 PIR: Pangos 23	Boxscore	Pts: Calathes 19; Rebs: Mirotić 6 Asts: Higgins 4 PIR: Higgins 19	Arena: Yubileyny Sports Palace; Attendance: 4,626; Referees: Saša Pukl, Fernando Rocha, Mehdi Diffalah

4 May 2021 5	Barcelona (Spain)	79–53	(Russia) Zenit Saint Petersburg	Barcelona
21:00	Scoring by quarter: 23–14, 20–16, 14–9, 22–14
	Pts: Higgins 15; Rebs: Davies 8 Asts: Calathes 5 PIR: Gasol 16	Boxscore	Pts: Poythress 11; Rebs: Black, Poythress 5 Asts: Pangos 10; PIR: Thomas 14	Arena: Palau Blaugrana; Attendance: 0 Referees: Robert Lottermoser, Oļegs Latiševs, Tomislav Hordov

==== Final Four ====
28 May 2021 Semifinal	Barcelona (Spain)	84–82	(Italy) AX Armani Exchange Milan	Cologne (Germany)
16:00 (CET)	Scoring by quarter: 27–24, 24–18, 16–29, 17–11
	Pts: Mirotić 21; Rebs: Mirotić 6 Asts: Calathes 6 PIR: Mirotić 28	[euroleaguebasketball.net/en/euroleague/game-center/2020-21/fc-barcelona-ax-armani-exchange-milan/E2020/325/ Boxscore]	Pts: Punter 23; Rebs: Delaney 4 Asts: Delaney 7 PIR: Punter 21	Arena: Lanxess Arena; Referees: Sreten Radović, Matej Boltauzer, Oļegs Latiševs

30 May 2021 Final	Barcelona (Spain)	81–86	(Turkey) Anadolu Efes	Cologne (Germany)
20:30 (CET)	Scoring by quarter: 22–15, 14–24, 22–26, 23–21
	Pts: Higgins 23; Rebs: Davies 11; Asts: Bolmaro 3 PIR: Higgins 23	Boxscore	Pts: Micić 25; Rebs: Moerman 8 Asts: Micić 5 PIR: Larkin, Micić 28	Arena: Lanxess Arena; Referees: Saša Pukl, Oļegs Latiševs, Gytis Vilius

=== Copa del Rey ===
==== Quarterfinals ====
12 February 2021	Barça	103–93(OT)	Unicaja	Madrid
21:30	Scoring by quarter: 15–29, 24–15, 21–21, 28–23, Overtime: 15–5
	Pts: Higgins 22; Rebs: Calathes 5 Asts: Calathes 5 PIR: Higgins 23	Boxscore	Pts: Brizuela 33; Rebs: Suárez, Thompson 7 Asts: Waczyński 5 PIR: Brizuela 22	Arena: WiZink Center; Attendance: 0 Referees: Emilio Pérez, Carlos Cortés, Sergio Manuel

==== Semifinals ====
13 February 2021	Barça	77–68	TD Systems Baskonia	Madrid
19:00	Scoring by quarter: 15–12, 23–15, 26–20, 13–21
	Pts: Mirotić 16; Rebs: Kuric 7 Asts: Calathes 8 PIR: Mirotić 17	Boxscore	Pts: Henry 19; Rebs: Polonara 8 Asts: Vildoza 4 PIR: Jekiri 23	Arena: WiZink Center; Attendance: 0 Referees: Daniel Hierrezuelo, Antonio Conde, Rafael Serrano

==== Final ====
14 February 2021	Real Madrid	73–88	Barça	Madrid
18:30	Scoring by quarter: 11–20, 20–32, 19–17, 23–19
	Pts: Tavares 17; Rebs: Tavares 9 Asts: Alocén 3 PIR: Tavares 28	Boxscore	Pts: Higgins 20; Rebs: Davies 8 Asts: Calathes 9 PIR: Calathes 18	Arena: WiZink Center; Attendance: 0 Referees: Daniel Hierrezuelo, Carlos Peruga, Antonio Conde

=== Supercopa de España ===
==== Semifinals ====
12 September 2020	TD Systems Baskonia	68–72	Barça	San Cristóbal de La Laguna
18:30	Scoring by quarter: 14–22, 14–13, 17–25, 23–12
	Pts: Peters, Vildoza 14; Rebs: three players 5 Asts: Henry 5 PIR: Peters 15	Boxscore	Pts: Abrines 19; Rebs: Mirotić 6 Asts: Calathes 8 PIR: Abrines, Mirotić 19	Arena: Santiago Martín; Attendance: 0 Referees: José Antonio Martín, Carlos Peruga, Sergio Manuel

==== Final ====
13 September 2020	Real Madrid	72–67	Barça	San Cristóbal de La Laguna
18:30	Scoring by quarter: 18–14, 13–18, 19–17, 22–18
	Pts: Campazzo 21; Rebs: Tavares 7 Asts: Campazzo 2 PIR: Campazzo 18	Boxscore	Pts: Mirotić 22; Rebs: Davies 8 Asts: three players 3 PIR: Mirotić 26	Arena: Santiago Martín; Attendance: 0 Referees: Sergio Manuel, Óscar Perea, Carlos Peruga

== Individual awards ==
=== Copa del Rey ===
Finals MVP

- (United States) Cory Higgins

=== Liga ACB ===
Finals MVP

- (Spain) Nikola Mirotić

All-Liga ACB Second Team

- (United States) Cory Higgins
- (Spain) Nikola Mirotić

Best All-Young Team

- (Argentina) Leandro Bolmaro

Player of the Round

- (Spain) Nikola Mirotić – Round 2, Round 16

=== EuroLeague ===
All-EuroLeague First Team

- (Spain) Nikola Mirotić

All-EuroLeague Second Team

- (Uganda) Brandon Davies

MVP of the Round

- (Spain) Nikola Mirotić – Round 6
- (Uganda) Brandon Davies – Round 1–2 of the Playoffs

MVP of the Month

- (Spain) Nikola Mirotić – March
