= 2019–20 FC Barcelona Bàsquet season =

Association football season

FC Barcelona
2019–20 season
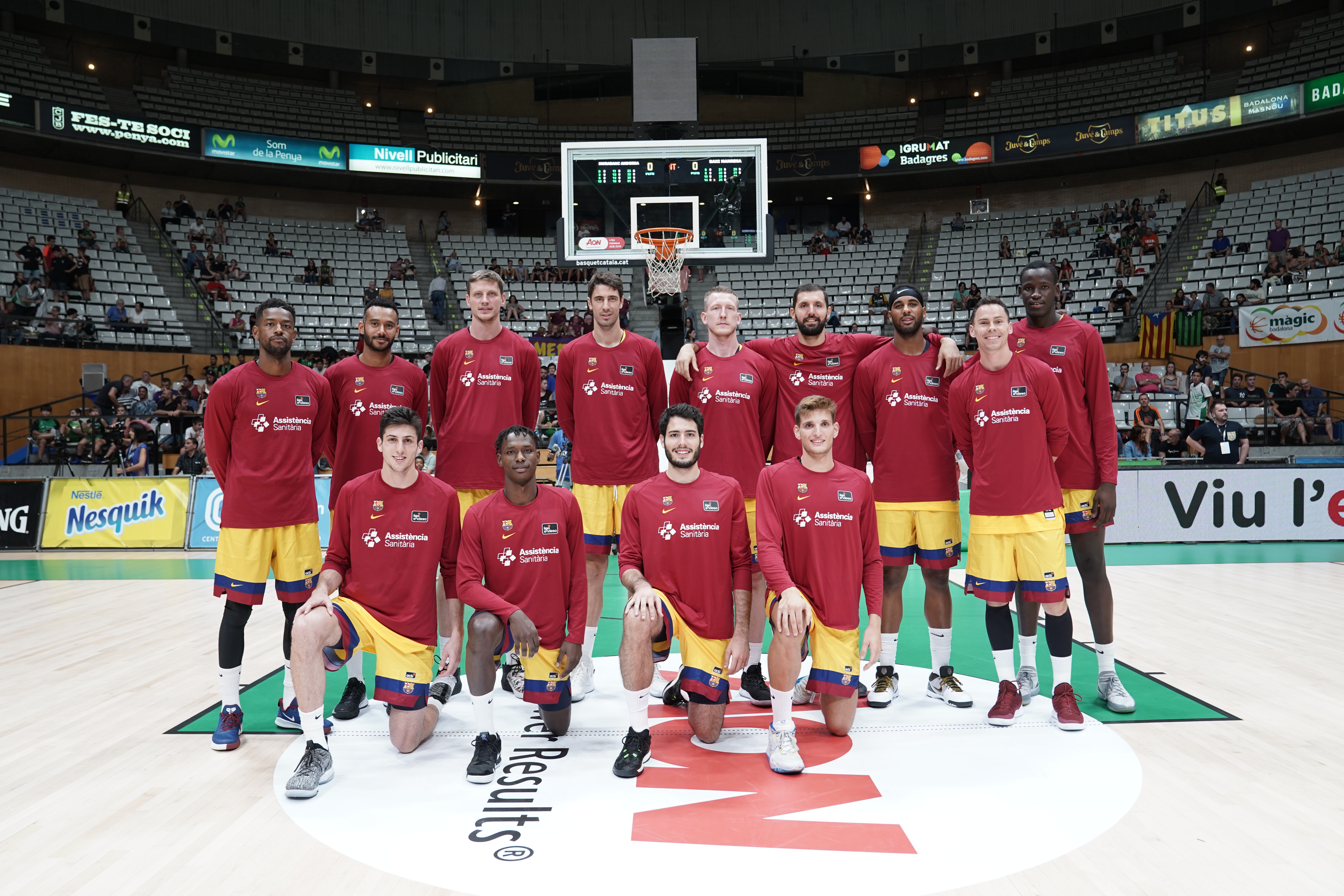
- Barcelona roster in September 2019
- President: Josep Maria Bartomeu
- Head coach: Svetislav Pešić
- Arena: Palau Blaugrana
- Liga ACB: 1st (Note: Regular season was cancelled due to the COVID-19 pandemic.)
- Playoffs: Runners-up
- EuroLeague: 3rd (Note: Season was cancelled due to the COVID-19 pandemic.)
- Copa del Rey: Quarterfinalist
- Supercopa: Runners-up
- Highest home attendance: Liga ACB: 7,387; Barça 83–63 Real Madrid (29 December 2019) EuroLeague: 7,173; Barcelona 90–80 Olympiacos (27 December 2019)
- Lowest home attendance: Liga ACB: 4,005; Barça 103–71 Tenerife (1 December 2019) EuroLeague: 3,585; Barcelona 103–84 Berlin (18 October 2019)
- Average home attendance: Liga ACB: 5,693; EuroLeague: 5,977
- Biggest win: Barça 103–71 Tenerife (1 December 2019)
- Biggest defeat: Barcelona 67–96 CSKA (29 November 2019)
Home	Away

The 2019–20 season was the 93rd in FC Barcelona's history, and the club's 55th consecutive season in the top flight of Spanish basketball and its 21st consecutive season in the EuroLeague. It was the third consecutive season under head coach Svetislav Pešić, who signed in February 2018.

Times up to 26 October 2019 and from 29 March 2020 were CEST (UTC+2). Times from 27 October 2019 to 28 March 2020 were CET (UTC+1).

== Overview ==
On 6 July 2019, Nikola Mirotić of the Milwaukee Bucks signed a three-year contract with Barcelona. It was reported that Mirotić' contract was worth € 26 million, making him the highest-paid basketball player in Europe.

== Players ==
=== Squad information ===
Note: Flags indicate national team eligibility at FIBA-sanctioned events. Players may hold other non-FIBA nationalities not displayed.

FC Barcelona roster
Players
Coaches

Pos.	No.	Nat.	Name	Ht.	Age
SF	21	(Spain)	Abrines, Álex	1.98 m (6 ft 6 in)	26 – 1 August 1993
SG	31	(Argentina)	Bolmaro, Leandro	1.98 m (6 ft 6 in)	19 – 11 September 2000
SF	30	(Spain)	Claver, Víctor	2.07 m (6 ft 9 in)	31 – 30 August 1988
C	0	(Uganda)	Davies, Brandon	2.08 m (6 ft 10 in)	28 – 25 July 1991
SF	8	(Hungary)	Hanga, Ádám	1.99 m (6 ft 6 in)	31 – 12 April 1989
PG	13	(France)	Heurtel, Thomas	1.89 m (6 ft 2 in)	31 – 10 April 1989
SG	22	(United States)	Higgins, Cory	1.96 m (6 ft 5 in)	31 – 14 June 1989
SG	24	(Slovakia)	Kuric, Kyle	1.93 m (6 ft 4 in)	30 – 25 August 1989
SF	32	(Spain)	Martínez, Sergi	2.02 m (6 ft 8 in)	21 – 10 May 1999
PF	33	(Spain)	Mirotić, Nikola	2.08 m (6 ft 10 in)	29 – 11 February 1991
PF	18	(Spain)	Oriola, Pierre	2.06 m (6 ft 9 in)	27 – 25 September 1992
PG	3	(Canada)	Pangos, Kevin	1.85 m (6 ft 1 in)	27 – 26 January 1993
C	14	(Ukraine)	Pustovyi, Artem	2.16 m (7 ft 1 in)	28 – 25 June 1992
SG	5	(Spain)	Ribas, Pau	1.94 m (6 ft 4 in)	33 – 2 March 1987
PF	10	(Latvia)	Šmits, Rolands	2.07 m (6 ft 9 in)	25 – 25 June 1995
C	44	(Croatia)	Tomić, Ante (C)	2.18 m (7 ft 2 in)	33 – 17 February 1987

Head coach

- (Serbia) Svetislav Pešić

Legend

- (C) Team captain
- Injured

- Roster

=== Transactions ===
==== In ====
No.	Pos.	Nat.	Name	Age	Moving from		Type	Ends	Date	Source
22	SG	(United States)	Cory Higgins	30	CSKA Moscow	(Russia)	End of contract	June 2022	2 July 2019	
0	C	(United States)	Brandon Davies	27	Žalgiris	(Lithuania)	Transfer	June 2021	3 July 2019	
33	PF	(Spain)	Nikola Mirotić	28	Milwaukee Bucks	(United States)	End of contract	June 2022	6 July 2019	
21	SF	(Spain)	Álex Abrines	25	Oklahoma City Thunder	(United States)	End of contract	June 2021	12 July 2019	
23	PG	(United States)	Malcolm Delaney	30	Guangdong Southern Tigers	(China)	End of contract	June 2020	12 September 2019	

==== Out ====
No.	Pos.	Nat.	Name	Age	Moving to		Type	Date	Source
1	C	(France)	Kevin Séraphin	29	Free agent		End of contract	16 July 2019	
6	PF	(United States)	Chris Singleton	29	Anadolu Efes	(Turkey)	End of contract	16 July 2019	
9	SG	(Slovenia)	Jaka Blažič	29	Cedevita Olimpija	(Slovenia)	End of contract	16 July 2019	
23	PG	(United States)	Malcolm Delaney	31	Free agent		Contract termination	14 May 2020	

== Pre-season and friendlies ==
=== Friendly match ===
5 September 2019	Barça	69–71	MoraBanc Andorra	Sant Julià de Vilatorta
20:00	Scoring by quarter: 14–20, 17–9, 18–28, 20–14
	Pts: Kuric 11; Rebs: Tomić 8 Asts: Bolmaro, Higgins 4 PIR: Davies 17	Boxscore	Pts: Senglin 12; Rebs: four players 4 Asts: four players 2 PIR: Pérez 12	Arena: Municipal; Attendance: 1,300; Referees: Antonio Zamora, José María Olivares, Sandra Sánchez

=== Lliga Catalana ===
9 September 2019	Club Joventut Badalona	85–87	Barça	Badalona
21:15	Scoring by quarter: 21–21, 25–29, 30–21, 9–16
	Pts: Prepelič 19; Rebs: Kanter 5 Asts: Zisis 7 PIR: Prepelič 18	Boxscore	Pts: Kuric 18; Rebs: Abrines 7 Asts: Hanga 4 PIR: Kuric 22	Arena: Palau Municipal d'Esports; Attendance: 3,718; Referees: José Antonio Martín Bertrán, Óscar Perea, Alberto Baena

11 September 2019	MoraBanc Andorra	92–93	Barça	Badalona
12:00	Scoring by quarter: 27–26, 28–27, 20–22, 17–18
	Pts: Diagne 14	Boxscore	Pts: Mirotić 25	Arena: Palau Municipal d'Esports; Attendance: 4,000; Referees: Jordi Aliaga, Óscar Perea, Alberto Baena

=== Torneo Xacobeo ===
14 September 2019	Monbus Obradoiro	77–80	Barça	Santiago de Compostela
18:30	Scoring by quarter: 19–20, 19–19, 21–20, 18–21
	Pts: Magee 22	Boxscore	Pts: Higgins 22	Arena: Multiusos Fontes do Sar; Referees: Miguel Ángel Pérez Pérez, Carlos Cortes, Jacobo Rial

== Competitions ==
=== Overview ===
Competition	First match	Last match	Starting round	Final position	Record							
Competition	First match	Last match	Starting round	Final position	Pld	W	D	L	PF	PA	PD	Win %
Liga ACB	27 September 2019	30 June 2020	Round 1	Runners-up	30	24	0	6	2,638	2,400	+238	80.00
EuroLeague	4 October 2019	6 March 2020	Round 1	3rd	28	22	0	6	2,357	2,193	+164	78.57
Copa del Rey	13 February 2020		Quarterfinals	Quarterfinalist	1	0	0	1	78	82	−4	0.00
Supercopa de España	21 September 2019	22 September 2019	Semifinals	Runners-up	2	1	0	1	150	154	−4	50.00
Total					61	47	0	14	5,223	4,829	+394	77.05

Source: Competitions

=== Liga ACB ===
==== League table ====
Pos	Team	Pld	W	L	PF	PA	PD	Qualification
1	Barça	23	19	4	2041	1847	+194	Qualification to playoffs
2	Real Madrid	23	18	5	1988	1758	+230	Qualification to playoffs
3	Casademont Zaragoza	23	16	7	1911	1810	+101	Qualification to playoffs
4	Iberostar Tenerife	22	14	8	1802	1736	+66	Qualification to playoffs
5	RETAbet Bilbao Basket	23	14	9	1906	1908	−2	Qualification to playoffs

Source: ACB

==== Results summary ====
Overall						Home					Away				
Pld	W	L	PF	PA	PD	W	L	PF	PA	PD	W	L	PF	PA	PD
23	19	4	2041	1847	+194	9	2	998	868	+130	10	2	1043	979	+64

Source: Competitive matches

==== Results by round ====
Round	1	2	3	4	5	6	7	8	9	10	11	12	13	14	15	16	17	18	19	20	21	22	23	24	25	26	27	28	29	30	31	32	33	34
Ground	A	H	A	H	H	A	H	A	H	A	H	A	H	A	H	A	H	A	H	A	A	H	A	H	A	H	H	A	H	A	A	H	A	H
Result	W	W	L	W	W	L	W	W	W	W	W	W	L	W	W	W	W	W	W	W	W	W	W	V	V	V	V	V	V	V	V	V	V	V
Position	8	5	6	5	4	3	3	3	2	2	2	2	2	2	2	2	2	2	2	1	1	1	1											

Source: Competitive matches
A = Away; H = Home; W = Win; L = Loss; V = Void

==== Matches ====
27 September 2019 1	Monbus Obradoiro	86–92	Barça	Santiago de Compostela
19:30	Scoring by quarter: 18–18, 25–28, 17–21, 26–25
	Pts: Kravić 17; Rebs: Kravić 10; Asts: Pozas 6 PIR: Kravić 26	Boxscore	Pts: Mirotić 27; Rebs: Tomić 9 Asts: Delaney 6 PIR: Mirotić 39	Arena: Multiusos Fontes do Sar; Attendance: 5,397; Referees: Emilio Pérez Pizarro, Luis Miguel Castillo, Iyán González

29 September 2019 2	Barça	95–87(OT)	Kirolbet Baskonia	Barcelona
18:30	Scoring by quarter: 24–19, 18–23, 16–21, 22–17, Overtime: 15–7
	Pts: Davies 24; Rebs: Davies 11; Asts: Hanga 7 PIR: Davies 35	Boxscore	Pts: Shengelia 16; Rebs: Fall 12; Asts: Henry 7 PIR: Fall 19	Arena: Palau Blaugrana; Attendance: 6,578; Referees: Benjamín Jiménez Trujillo, Vicente Bultó, Alfonso Olivares

6 October 2019 3	MoraBanc Andorra	86–84	Barça	Andorra la Vella
20:00	Scoring by quarter: 20–21, 24–19, 18–16, 24–28
	Pts: Diagne 19; Rebs: Diagne 7 Asts: Hannah, Senglin 5 PIR: Diagne 23	Boxscore	Pts: Mirotić 17; Rebs: Hanga, Mirotić 6 Asts: Delaney 6 PIR: Mirotić 19	Arena: M.I. Govern Andorra; Attendance: 4,414; Referees: Daniel Hierrezuelo, Rafael Serrano, Esperanza Mendoza

13 October 2019 4	Barça	97–94	Valencia Basket	Barcelona
18:30	Scoring by quarter: 27–23, 25–23, 22–26, 23–22
	Pts: Mirotić 33; Rebs: Mirotić 5 Asts: Mirotić 6 PIR: Mirotić 43	Boxscore	Pts: Loyd 30; Rebs: Dubljević 7 Asts: Vives 4 PIR: Loyd 37	Arena: Palau Blaugrana; Attendance: 6,998; Referees: Antonio Conde, Alberto Sánchez, Arnau Padrós

20 October 2019 5	Barça	89–75	Herbalife Gran Canaria	Barcelona
20:00	Scoring by quarter: 23–19, 20–24, 29–12, 17–20
	Pts: Davies, Mirotić 20; Rebs: Mirotić 10; Asts: Hanga 6 PIR: Mirotić 25	Boxscore	Pts: Paulí 15; Rebs: Burjanadze 10; Asts: Cook 9 PIR: Paulí 18	Arena: Palau Blaugrana; Attendance: 4,873; Referees: Carlos Cortés, Luis Castillo, Rubén Sánchez

27 October 2019 6	Casademont Zaragoza	89–83	Barça	Zaragoza
18:30	Scoring by quarter: 23–17, 23–23, 25–21, 18–22
	Pts: Benzing, Seeley 15; Rebs: Justiz, Radović 6 Asts: Alocén 9 PIR: Alocén 13	Boxscore	Pts: Davies, Mirotić 21; Rebs: Mirotić 7 Asts: Hanga 5 PIR: Mirotić 31	Arena: Pabellón Príncipe Felipe; Attendance: 9,054; Referees: Miguel Ángel Pérez Pérez, Óscar Perea, Roberto Lucas

3 November 2019 7	Barça	87–74	Montakit Fuenlabrada	Barcelona
20:00	Scoring by quarter: 23–24, 18–18, 25–18, 21–14
	Pts: Davies, Delaney 12; Rebs: Davies 8 Asts: Claver, Delaney 3 PIR: Delaney 16	Boxscore	Pts: García 18; Rebs: Gillet 5 Asts: Bellas 5 PIR: García 20	Arena: Palau Blaugrana; Attendance: 5,245; Referees: Juan Carlos García González, José Ramón García Ortiz, Esperanza Mendoza

10 November 2019 8	Coosur Real Betis	95–100	Barça	Seville
17:00	Scoring by quarter: 23–28, 22–20, 24–30, 26–22
	Pts: Enechionyia, Slaughter 24; Rebs: three players 5 Asts: Rivers, Sipahi 4 PIR: Enechionyia 31	Boxscore	Pts: Higgins 24; Rebs: Delaney, Kuric 5 Asts: Higgins 5 PIR: Higgins 26	Arena: San Pablo; Attendance: 5,410; Referees: Daniel Hierrezuelo, Jorge Martínez, Alfonso Olivares

17 November 2019 9	Barça	94–72	Movistar Estudiantes	Barcelona
12:30	Scoring by quarter: 30–19, 14–13, 26–18, 24–22
	Pts: Davies 20; Rebs: Oriola 8 Asts: Delaney 6 PIR: Davies 25	Boxscore	Pts: Scrubb 18; Rebs: Dangubić 5 Asts: Dangubić 4 PIR: Pressey 19	Arena: Palau Blaugrana; Attendance: 5,468; Referees: Jordi Aliaga, Raúl Zamorano, Alberto Baena

24 November 2019 10	UCAM Murcia	83–87	Barça	Murcia
17:00	Scoring by quarter: 18–19, 23–13, 25–29, 17–26
	Pts: Eddie 24; Rebs: Hunt 8 Asts: Larentzakis 4 PIR: Eddie 20	Boxscore	Pts: Mirotić 20; Rebs: Mirotić 11; Asts: Hanga 4 PIR: Mirotić 28	Arena: Palacio de Deportes; Attendance: 6,877; Referees: Emilio Pérez Pizarro, Francisco José Araña, Javier Torres

1 December 2019 11	Barça	103–71	Iberostar Tenerife	Barcelona
20:00	Scoring by quarter: 26–19, 21–20, 28–24, 28–8
	Pts: Tomić 14; Rebs: Oriola 10; Asts: Ribas 6 PIR: Oriola, Pustovyi 18	Boxscore	Pts: Lundberg 11; Rebs: Shermadini 9 Asts: Huertas 5 PIR: Huertas 13	Arena: Palau Blaugrana; Attendance: 4,005; Referees: Carlos Cortés, Martín Caballero, Vicente Martínez

8 December 2019 12	Baxi Manresa	75–84	Barça	Manresa
18:30	Scoring by quarter: 22–25, 15–16, 22–22, 16–21
	Pts: Dulkys 19; Rebs: Kravish 10; Asts: Pérez 9 PIR: Toolson 18	Boxscore	Pts: Mirotić 21; Rebs: Tomić 13; Asts: Hanga 5 PIR: Mirotić 28	Arena: Nou Congost; Attendance: 5,000; Referees: Óscar Perea, Raúl Zamorano, Roberto Lucas

15 December 2019 13	Barça	95–105	Unicaja	Barcelona
18:30	Scoring by quarter: 26–27, 30–24, 18–25, 21–29
	Pts: Tomić 20; Rebs: Higgins 6 Asts: Delaney 5 PIR: Tomić 21	Boxscore	Pts: Adams 19; Rebs: Suárez 7 Asts: Fernández 7 PIR: Adams 22	Arena: Palau Blaugrana; Attendance: 5,876; Referees: Carlos Peruga, Sergio Manuel, Carlos Merino

22 December 2019 14	Club Joventut Badalona	80–95	Barça	Badalona
18:30	Scoring by quarter: 14–21, 26–25, 20–29, 20–20
	Pts: Morgan 18; Rebs: Omić 9 Asts: Zisis 10; PIR: Morgan 19	Boxscore	Pts: Mirotić 23; Rebs: Tomić 11; Asts: Hanga 6 PIR: Mirotić 31	Arena: Palau Municipal d'Esports; Attendance: 9,328; Referees: José Antonio Martín Bertrán, Vicente Bultó, Arnau Padros

29 December 2019 15	Barça	83–63	Real Madrid	Barcelona
18:30	Scoring by quarter: 22–5, 17–22, 23–18, 21–18
	Pts: Mirotić 20; Rebs: Mirotić 6 Asts: Delaney, Kuric 3 PIR: Hanga 18	Boxscore	Pts: Thompkins 13; Rebs: Garuba 5 Asts: Campazzo 6 PIR: Thompkins, Randolph 12	Arena: Palau Blaugrana; Attendance: 7,387; Referees: Daniel Hierrezuelo, Juan de Dios Oyón, Rafael Serrano

4 January 2020 16	San Pablo Burgos	80–82	Barça	Burgos
20:30	Scoring by quarter: 28–20, 19–24, 15–17, 18–21
	Pts: Benite 22; Rebs: Bassas 6 Asts: Bassas 5 PIR: Benite 17	Boxscore	Pts: Mirotić 28; Rebs: Hanga 7 Asts: Delaney 4 PIR: Mirotić 30	Arena: Coliseum Burgos; Attendance: 9,579; Referees: Antonio Conde, Jordi Aliaga, Rubén Sánchez

12 January 2020 17	Barça	92–94(OT)	RETAbet Bilbao Basket	Barcelona
12:30	Scoring by quarter: 17–14, 24–18, 21–30, 22–22, Overtime: 8–10
	Pts: Mirotić 24; Rebs: Oriola 12; Asts: Delaney, Ribas 3 PIR: Mirotić 35	Boxscore	Pts: Bouteille 20; Rebs: Balvín 9 Asts: Rousselle 9 PIR: Bouteille 21	Arena: Palau Blaugrana; Attendance: 6,155; Referees: Carlos Cortés, Óscar Perea, David Sánchez

19 January 2020 18	Montakit Fuenlabrada	90–94	Barça	Fuenlabrada
12:30	Scoring by quarter: 12–22, 24–25, 26–28, 28–19
	Pts: García 28; Rebs: Mockevičius 9 Asts: Brown 5 PIR: García 29	Boxscore	Pts: Abrines 18; Rebs: Mirotić 7 Asts: Ribas 8 PIR: Mirotić 21	Arena: Fernando Martín; Attendance: 4,906; Referees: Fernando Calatrava, Martín Caballero, Iyán González

25 January 2020 19	Barça	77–59	Coosur Real Betis	Barcelona
20:30	Scoring by quarter: 21–15, 13–16, 13–11, 30–17
	Pts: Kuric 17; Rebs: Šmits, Tomić 7 Asts: Heurtel 6 PIR: Oriola 19	Boxscore	Pts: Conger, Slaughter 16; Rebs: Martín 6 Asts: Sipahi 5 PIR: Conger 17	Arena: Palau Blaugrana; Attendance: 5,006; Referees: Antonio Conde, Javier Torres, Roberto Lucas

2 February 2020 20	Iberostar Tenerife	83–87	Barça	San Cristóbal de La Laguna
18:30	Scoring by quarter: 20–23, 20–27, 18–14, 25–23
	Pts: Salin 24; Rebs: Salin, Shermadini 6 Asts: Huertas 11; PIR: Salin 29	Boxscore	Pts: Mirotić 18; Rebs: three players 6 Asts: Delaney 5 PIR: Mirotić 23	Arena: Santiago Martín; Attendance: 5,100; Referees: Juan Carlos García González, Alberto Sánchez, Jacobo Rial

9 February 2020 21	Herbalife Gran Canaria	65–81	Barça	Las Palmas
18:30	Scoring by quarter: 15–20, 21–22, 15–22, 14–17
	Pts: Burjanadze 13; Rebs: two players 4 Asts: Cook 6 PIR: Burjanadze 16	Boxscore	Pts: Higgins 16; Rebs: Oriola 7 Asts: Delaney 7 PIR: Oriola 20	Arena: Gran Canaria Arena; Attendance: 7,271; Referees: Carlos Peruga, Francisco José Araña, Cristóbal Sánchez

1 March 2020 22	Barça	86–74	Baxi Manresa	Barcelona
12:30	Scoring by quarter: 24–16, 16–23, 26–23, 12–16
	Pts: Davies 24; Rebs: Oriola 7 Asts: Ribas 4 PIR: Davies 27	Boxscore	Pts: Kravish 15; Rebs: Kravish 9 Asts: Pérez 6 PIR: two players 14	Arena: Palau Blaugrana; Attendance: 5,028; Referees: Daniel Hierrezuelo, Rafael Serrano, Rubén Sánchez

8 March 2020 23	Movistar Estudiantes	67–74	Barça	Madrid
18:30	Scoring by quarter: 17–13, 18–15, 17–27, 15–19
	Pts: Avramović 18; Rebs: Arteaga 11; Asts: Jackson 5 PIR: Arteaga 22	Boxscore	Pts: Mirotić 17; Rebs: Oriola, Hanga 9 Asts: Ribas 4 PIR: Mirotić 26	Arena: WiZink Center; Attendance: 10,612; Referees: Emilio Pérez Pizarro, José Ramón García Ortiz, Martín Caballero

24	Barça	vs.	San Pablo Burgos	Barcelona
		Boxscore		Arena: Palau Blaugrana

25	Real Madrid	vs.	Barça	Madrid
		Boxscore		Arena: WiZink Center

26	Barça	vs.	Monbus Obradoiro	Barcelona
		Boxscore		Arena: Palau Blaugrana

27	Barça	vs.	Casademont Zaragoza	Barcelona
		Boxscore		Arena: Palau Blaugrana

28	Valencia Basket	vs.	Barça	Valencia
		Boxscore		Arena: La Fonteta

29	Barça	vs.	Club Joventut Badalona	Barcelona
		Boxscore		Arena: Palau Blaugrana

30	Unicaja	vs.	Barça	Málaga
		Boxscore		Arena: Martín Carpena

31	RETAbet Bilbao Basket	vs.	Barça	Bilbao
		Boxscore		Arena: Bilbao Arena

32	Barça	vs.	MoraBanc Andorra	Barcelona
		Boxscore		Arena: Palau Blaugrana

33	Kirolbet Baskonia	vs.	Barça	Vitoria-Gasteiz
		Boxscore		Arena: Buesa Arena

34	Barça	vs.	UCAM Murcia	Barcelona
		Boxscore		Arena: Palau Blaugrana

==== Playoffs ====
===== Group stage =====
Pos	Team	Pld	W	L	PF	PA	PD	Qualification
1	Barça	5	4	1	432	400	+32	Qualification to the semifinals
2	Kirolbet Baskonia	5	3	2	402	379	+23	Qualification to the semifinals
3	Unicaja	5	3	2	418	395	+23	
4	Iberostar Tenerife	5	2	3	381	406	−25	
5	Club Joventut Badalona	5	2	3	423	429	−6	
6	RETAbet Bilbao Basket	5	1	4	359	406	−47	

Source: ACB

17 June 2020 1	Barça	96–92	Club Joventut Badalona	Valencia
15:30	Scoring by quarter: 21–17, 23–13, 30–27, 22–35
	Pts: Mirotić 16; Rebs: Claver, Tomić 6 Asts: Hanga 8 PIR: Mirotić 21	Boxscore	Pts: Morgan 21; Rebs: Omić 8 Asts: three players 4 PIR: Omić 21	Arena: La Fonteta; Referees: Antonio Conde, Jordi Aliaga, Sergio Manuel

19 June 2020 2	Unicaja	73–84	Barça	Valencia
18:30	Scoring by quarter: 20–14, 21–24, 15–23, 17–23
	Pts: Waczyński 13; Rebs: Suárez 9 Asts: Mekel 5 PIR: Waczyński 18	Boxscore	Pts: Mirotić 19; Rebs: Tomić 7 Asts: Heurtel 6 PIR: Tomić 25	Arena: La Fonteta; Referees: Juan Carlos García González, Óscar Perea, Javier Torres

21 June 2020 3	Barça	81–75	Kirolbet Baskonia	Valencia
21:30	Scoring by quarter: 20–11, 22–28, 13–17, 26–19
	Pts: Hanga 15; Rebs: Mirotić 8 Asts: Hanga 7 PIR: Mirotić 22	Boxscore	Pts: Shields 26; Rebs: Eric 8 Asts: Granger, Henry 4 PIR: Shields 22	Arena: La Fonteta; Referees: Carlos Peruga, Emilio Pérez Pizarro, Sergio Manuel

23 June 2020 4	RETAbet Bilbao Basket	73–85	Barça	Valencia
18:30	Scoring by quarter: 16–19, 17–15, 23–27, 17–24
	Pts: Rousselle, Sulejmanović 11; Rebs: Cruz 9 Asts: Serron 6 PIR: Rodríguez 14	Boxscore	Pts: Oriola 23; Rebs: Oriola 9 Asts: Hanga 12; PIR: Oriola 29	Arena: La Fonteta; Referees: Fernando Calatrava, Luis Miguel Castillo, José Ramón García Ortiz

25 June 2020 5	Barça	86–87	Iberostar Tenerife	Valencia
21:30	Scoring by quarter: 17–25, 20–22, 24–14, 25–26
	Pts: Davies 20; Rebs: Davies 11; Asts: Heurtel, Ribas 4 PIR: Davies 24	Boxscore	Pts: Konaté 18; Rebs: Guerra 6 Asts: Lundberg 6 PIR: Konaté 27	Arena: La Fonteta; Referees: Emilio Pérez Pizarro, Luis Miguel Castillo, Javier Torres

===== Semifinals =====
28 June 2020	Barça	98–84	San Pablo Burgos	Valencia
17:00	Scoring by quarter: 23–17, 20–24, 29–17, 26–26
	Pts: Mirotić 18; Rebs: Oriola 6 Asts: Heurtel 11; PIR: Heurtel 20	Boxscore	Pts: Benite 16; Rebs: Aguilar 7 Asts: Bassas 4 PIR: Apić, Fitipaldo 13	Arena: La Fonteta; Referees: Daniel Hierrezuelo, Carlos Cortés, Jordi Aliaga

===== Final =====
30 June 2020	Barça	67–69	Kirolbet Baskonia	Valencia
20:00	Scoring by quarter: 16–17, 23–16, 12–18, 16–18
	Pts: Heurtel 21; Rebs: Davies 8 Asts: Heurtel 5 PIR: Heurtel 25	Boxscore	Pts: Vildoza 17; Rebs: Diop 7 Asts: Henry 3 PIR: Vildoza 20	Arena: La Fonteta; Referees: Carlos Peruga, Daniel Hierrezuelo, Antonio Conde

=== EuroLeague ===
==== League table ====
Pos	Team	Pld	W	L	PF	PA	PD
1	(Turkey) Anadolu Efes	28	24	4	2432	2166	+266
2	(Spain) Real Madrid	28	22	6	2371	2165	+206
3	(Spain) Barcelona	28	22	6	2357	2193	+164
4	(Russia) CSKA Moscow	28	19	9	2305	2125	+180
5	(Israel) Maccabi Tel Aviv	28	19	9	2291	2164	+127

Source: EuroLeague
Rules for classification: All points scored in extra period(s) were not counted in the standings, nor for any tie-break situation.

==== Results summary ====
Overall						Home					Away				
Pld	W	L	PF	PA	PD	W	L	PF	PA	PD	W	L	PF	PA	PD
28	22	6	2357	2193	+164	11	2	1131	1026	+105	11	4	1226	1167	+59

Source: Competitive matches

==== Results by round ====
Round	1	2	3	4	5	6	7	8	9	10	11	12	13	14	15	16	17	18	19	20	21	22	23	24	25	26	27	28	29	30	31	32	33	34
Ground	A	A	H	A	H	A	A	A	H	H	H	A	H	H	A	H	A	H	A	A	H	H	A	H	A	A	A	H	H	H	A	H	H	A
Result	W	W	W	W	W	L	W	L	W	W	L	W	W	W	W	W	L	L	L	W	W	W	W	W	W	W	W	W	V	V	V	V	V	V
Position	6	2	1	2	1	2	1	3	1	1	2	2	3	2	2	3	3	3	5	5	4	3	2	3	3	3	3	3						

Source: Competitive matches
A = Away; H = Home; W = Win; L = Loss; V = Void

==== Matches ====
4 October 2019 1	Anadolu Efes (Turkey)	64–74	(Spain) Barcelona	Istanbul
19:30	Scoring by quarter: 14–19, 12–18, 20–12, 18–25
	Pts: Peters 16; Rebs: Dunston 9 Asts: Micić 5 PIR: Peters 19	Boxscore	Pts: Mirotić 24; Rebs: Hanga 6 Asts: Delaney 7 PIR: Mirotić 22	Arena: Sinan Erdem Dome; Attendance: 11,580; Referees: Borys Ryzhyk, Matej Boltauzer, Carmelo Paternicò

10 October 2019 2	Zenit Saint Petersburg (Russia)	63–87	(Spain) Barcelona	Saint Petersburg
19:00	Scoring by quarter: 20–19, 20–24, 16–16, 7–28
	Pts: Voronov 10; Rebs: Iverson 8 Asts: Iverson 5 PIR: Iverson 15	Boxscore	Pts: Kuric 24; Rebs: Mirotić 10; Asts: Davies 6 PIR: Kuric 26	Arena: Sibur Arena; Attendance: 6,585; Referees: Christos Christodoulou, Fernando Rocha, Milija Vojinović

18 October 2019 3	Barcelona (Spain)	103–84	(Germany) ALBA Berlin	Barcelona
21:00	Scoring by quarter: 19–25, 27–19, 26–17, 31–23
	Pts: Higgins 22; Rebs: Claver 7 Asts: Hanga 8 PIR: Higgins 27	Boxscore	Pts: Giedraitis 17; Rebs: Nnoko 7 Asts: Siva 8 PIR: Giedraitis 18	Arena: Palau Blaugrana; Attendance: 3,585; Referees: Damir Javor, Piotr Pastusiak, Hugues Thépénier

25 October 2019 4	Crvena zvezda mts (Serbia)	65–73	(Spain) Barcelona	Belgrade
19:00	Scoring by quarter: 16–12, 20–21, 13–24, 16–16
	Pts: Gist 10; Rebs: three players 4 Asts: L. Brown 3 PIR: Faye 10	Boxscore	Pts: Mirotić 21; Rebs: Davies, Mirotić 6 Asts: Higgins 5 PIR: Davies 24	Arena: Aleksandar Nikolić Hall; Attendance: 6,384; Referees: Oļegs Latiševs, Joseph Bissang, Marcin Kowalski

30 October 2019 5	Barcelona (Spain)	83–77	(Spain) Valencia Basket	Barcelona
21:00	Scoring by quarter: 21–19, 23–22, 18–24, 21–12
	Pts: Higgins 20; Rebs: Davies, Mirotić 7 Asts: Hanga 6 PIR: Mirotić 23	Boxscore	Pts: Loyd 17; Rebs: Dubljević 10; Asts: Colom 3 PIR: Dubljević 24	Arena: Palau Blaugrana; Attendance: 5,734; Referees: Saša Pukl, Mehdi Difallah, Ioannis Foufis

1 November 2019 6	A|X Armani Exchange Milan (Italy)	83–70	(Spain) Barcelona	Assago
20:00	Scoring by quarter: 15–20, 15–17, 22–21, 31–12
	Pts: Rodríguez 17; Rebs: Scola 9 Asts: Rodríguez 7 PIR: Micov, Scola 22	Boxscore	Pts: Davies 15; Rebs: three players 5 Asts: Delaney 4 PIR: Davies 14	Arena: Mediolanum Forum; Attendance: 12,064; Referees: Ilija Belošević, Emin Moğulkoç, Joseph Bissang

8 November 2019 7	Žalgiris (Lithuania)	86–93	(Spain) Barcelona	Kaunas
19:00	Scoring by quarter: 20–23, 20–24, 21–19, 25–27
	Pts: LeDay 16; Rebs: Hayes 5 Asts: Walkup 5 PIR: Walkup 18	Boxscore	Pts: Higgins 27; Rebs: Davies, Mirotić 6 Asts: Delaney 7 PIR: Higgins 33	Arena: Žalgirio Arena; Attendance: 15,342; Referees: Borys Ryzhyk, Fernando Rocha, Sašo Petek

14 November 2019 8	Real Madrid (Spain)	86–76	(Spain) Barcelona	Madrid
21:00	Scoring by quarter: 32–14, 16–36, 23–14, 15–12
	Pts: Randolph 16; Rebs: Randolph 7 Asts: Campazzo 6 PIR: Randolph 20	Boxscore	Pts: Mirotić 19; Rebs: Higgins 6 Asts: Delaney 4 PIR: Kuric, Tomić 16	Arena: WiZink Center; Attendance: 12,729; Referees: Luigi Lamonica, Damir Javor, Tomasz Trawicki

20 November 2019 9	Barcelona (Spain)	89–63	(Turkey) Fenerbahçe Beko	Barcelona
21:00	Scoring by quarter: 25–15, 19–15, 23–10, 22–23
	Pts: Higgins 22; Rebs: Mirotić 10; Asts: Delaney 9 PIR: Higgins 22	Boxscore	Pts: Lauvergne 12; Rebs: Štimac 6 Asts: Sloukas 5 PIR: Lauvergne, Sloukas 11	Arena: Palau Blaugrana; Attendance: 6,287; Referees: Christos Christodoulou, Matej Boltauzer, Oļegs Latiševs

22 November 2019 10	Barcelona (Spain)	96–73	(Israel) Maccabi FOX Tel Aviv	Barcelona
21:00	Scoring by quarter: 21–18, 22–28, 31–20, 22–7
	Pts: Mirotić 25; Rebs: Mirotić 14; Asts: four players 3 PIR: Mirotić 35	Boxscore	Pts: Dorsey 15; Rebs: Avdija 7 Asts: Wilbekin 4 PIR: Wilbekin 15	Arena: Palau Blaugrana; Attendance: 6,734; Referees: Milivoje Jovčić, Carmelo Paternicò, Joseph Bissang

29 November 2019 11	Barcelona (Spain)	67–96	(Russia) CSKA Moscow	Barcelona
21:00	Scoring by quarter: 20–18, 18–33, 12–25, 17–20
	Pts: Davies, Mirotić 19; Rebs: Hanga 7 Asts: Delaney 6 PIR: Davies 24	Boxscore	Pts: James 14; Rebs: Hines 7 Asts: James 6 PIR: Kurbanov 19	Arena: Palau Blaugrana; Attendance: 7,002; Referees: Borys Ryzhyk, Saša Pukl, Tomislav Hordov

6 December 2019 12	Khimki (Russia)	94–102	(Spain) Barcelona	Mytishchi
18:00	Scoring by quarter: 22–31, 26–30, 22–23, 24–18
	Pts: Shved 23; Rebs: Booker 5 Asts: Jerebko 6 PIR: Karasev 20	Boxscore	Pts: Mirotić 28; Rebs: Mirotić 9 Asts: Delaney 9 PIR: Mirotić 30	Arena: Mytishchi Arena; Attendance: 6,246; Referees: Fernando Rocha, Mehdi Difallah, Milan Nedović

13 December 2019 13	Barcelona (Spain)	98–86	(Greece) Panathinaikos OPAP	Barcelona
21:00	Scoring by quarter: 28–23, 27–24, 16–18, 27–21
	Pts: Mirotić 23; Rebs: Mirotić 7 Asts: Hanga 6 PIR: Mirotić 30	Boxscore	Pts: Fredette 19; Rebs: Calathes, Papapetrou 5 Asts: Calathes 13; PIR: Calathes 26	Arena: Palau Blaugrana; Attendance: 5,006; Referees: Ilija Belošević, Emin Moğulkoç, Sašo Petek

18 December 2019 14	Barcelona (Spain)	80–67	(France) LDLC ASVEL	Barcelona
21:00	Scoring by quarter: 22–19, 26–19, 15–18, 17–11
	Pts: Abrines 16; Rebs: Tomić 8 Asts: Delaney 5 PIR: Mirotić 17	Boxscore	Pts: Lighty 16; Rebs: Lighty 6 Asts: Lomažs, Taylor 4 PIR: Lighty 20	Arena: Palau Blaugrana; Attendance: 5,028; Referees: Oļegs Latiševs, Piotr Pastusiak, Mario Majkić

20 December 2019 15	Bayern Munich (Germany)	67–77	(Spain) Barcelona	Munich
20:30	Scoring by quarter: 16–20, 9–19, 20–17, 22–21
	Pts: Zipser 19; Rebs: Lučić 4 Asts: Flaccadori 5 PIR: Zipser 17	Boxscore	Pts: Higgins 16; Rebs: Mirotić 9 Asts: Hanga 10; PIR: Hanga 23	Arena: Audi Dome; Attendance: 5,610; Referees: Matej Boltauzer, Ioannis Foufis, Hugues Thépénier

27 December 2019 16	Barcelona (Spain)	90–80	(Greece) Olympiacos	Barcelona
21:00	Scoring by quarter: 20–12, 20–27, 29–19, 21–22
	Pts: Mirotić 21; Rebs: Mirotić 15; Asts: Delaney, Higgins 4 PIR: Mirotić 33	Boxscore	Pts: Reed 15; Rebs: Papanikolaou, Rubit 5 Asts: Rochestie 7 PIR: Rubit 17	Arena: Palau Blaugrana; Attendance: 7,173; Referees: Saša Pukl, Carmelo Paternicò, Tomasz Trawicki

2 January 2020 17	Kirolbet Baskonia (Spain)	76–74	(Spain) Barcelona	Vitoria-Gasteiz
21:00	Scoring by quarter: 21–15, 26–16, 18–23, 11–20
	Pts: Henry 20; Rebs: Shengelia 5 Asts: Henry, Shengelia 3 PIR: Henry 22	Boxscore	Pts: Mirotić 17; Rebs: Davies 6 Asts: Delaney 6 PIR: Mirotić 19	Arena: Buesa Arena; Attendance: 13,628; Referees: Christos Christodoulou, Mehdi Difallah, Sérgio Silva

10 January 2020 18	Barcelona (Spain)	82–86	(Turkey) Anadolu Efes	Barcelona
21:00	Scoring by quarter: 19–24, 23–21, 16–21, 24–20
	Pts: Davies 20; Rebs: Mirotić 8 Asts: Claver, Ribas 5 PIR: Delaney 17	Boxscore	Pts: Larkin 26; Rebs: Simon, Singleton 8 Asts: Larkin 5 PIR: Larkin 35	Arena: Palau Blaugrana; Attendance: 7,031; Referees: Borys Ryzhyk, Fernando Rocha, Sašo Petek

14 January 2020 19	Maccabi FOX Tel Aviv (Israel)	92–85	(Spain) Barcelona	Tel Aviv
20:05	Scoring by quarter: 20–27, 28–14, 17–16, 27–28
	Pts: Dorsey 19; Rebs: Hunter 7 Asts: three players 3 PIR: Dorsey 18	Boxscore	Pts: Mirotić 22; Rebs: Mirotić 10; Asts: Delaney, Hanga 6 PIR: Mirotić 30	Arena: Menora Mivtachim Arena; Attendance: 10,722; Referees: Ilija Belošević, Emin Moğulkoç, Tomislav Hordov

16 January 2020 20	Fenerbahçe Beko (Turkey)	74–80	(Spain) Barcelona	Istanbul
18:45	Scoring by quarter: 12–24, 27–18, 17–19, 18–19
	Pts: Sloukas 14; Rebs: Sloukas 7 Asts: Sloukas 11; PIR: Sloukas 26	Boxscore	Pts: Claver 17; Rebs: Mirotić 11; Asts: Davies 4 PIR: Mirotić 24	Arena: Ülker Sports and Event Hall; Attendance: 12,592; Referees: Damir Javor, Joseph Bissang, Ioannis Foufis

23 January 2020 21	Barcelona (Spain)	86–82	(Serbia) Crvena zvezda mts	Barcelona
21:00	Scoring by quarter: 29–19, 12–23, 21–24, 24–16
	Pts: Mirotić 25; Rebs: Mirotić 6 Asts: Delaney 5 PIR: Mirotić 25	Boxscore	Pts: L. Brown 15; Rebs: Gist 6 Asts: L. Brown 8 PIR: L. Brown 19	Arena: Palau Blaugrana; Attendance: 5,427; Referees: Oļegs Latiševs, Piotr Pastusiak, Seffi Shemmesh

30 January 2020 22	Barcelona (Spain)	90–72	(Russia) Zenit Saint Petersburg	Barcelona
21:00	Scoring by quarter: 21–21, 32–14, 21–19, 16–18
	Pts: Delaney, Kuric 21; Rebs: three players 4 Asts: Heurtel 7 PIR: Kuric 21	Boxscore	Pts: Albicy 16; Rebs: Ayón 10; Asts: four players 3 PIR: Albicy 23	Arena: Palau Blaugrana; Attendance: 5,893; Referees: Christos Christodoulou, Miloš Koljenšić, Jakub Zamojski

5 February 2020 23	Valencia Basket (Spain)	76–77	(Spain) Barcelona	Valencia
21:00	Scoring by quarter: 21–18, 22–19, 23–16, 10–24
	Pts: San Emeterio 17; Rebs: Dubljević 13; Asts: four players 3 PIR: San Emeterio 22	Boxscore	Pts: Mirotić 26; Rebs: Claver, Oriola 5 Asts: Hanga 6 PIR: Mirotić 32	Arena: La Fonteta; Attendance: 7,840; Referees: Matej Boltauzer, Fernando Rocha, Hugues Thépénier

7 February 2020 24	Barcelona (Spain)	84–80	(Italy) A|X Armani Exchange Milan	Barcelona
21:00	Scoring by quarter: 23–17, 13–28, 27–14, 21–21
	Pts: Delaney 26; Rebs: Tomić 7 Asts: Delaney 9 PIR: Delaney 37	Boxscore	Pts: Rodríguez 14; Rebs: Tarczewski 9 Asts: Rodríguez 5 PIR: Tarczewski 18	Arena: Palau Blaugrana; Attendance: 7,013; Referees: Ilija Belošević, Mehdi Difallah, Gytis Vilius

21 February 2020 25	Panathinaikos OPAP (Greece)	81–92	(Spain) Barcelona	Athens
20:30	Scoring by quarter: 23–20, 22–18, 24–29, 12–25
	Pts: Papagiannis 14; Rebs: Papagiannis 8 Asts: Calathes 11; PIR: Papagiannis 21	Boxscore	Pts: Mirotić 20; Rebs: Mirotić 9 Asts: Delaney 6 PIR: Mirotić 23	Arena: O.A.K.A. Attendance: 11,003; Referees: Luigi Lamonica, Damir Javor, Emin Moğulkoç

27 February 2020 26	CSKA Moscow (Russia)	80–82	(Spain) Barcelona	Moscow
18:00	Scoring by quarter: 15–18, 25–19, 20–26, 20–19
	Pts: Hackett 17; Rebs: Bolomboy 7 Asts: Hackett, James 4 PIR: Hilliard 22	Boxscore	Pts: Mirotić 23; Rebs: Mirotić 8 Asts: three players 3 PIR: Mirotić 32	Arena: Megasport Arena; Attendance: 11,355; Referees: Robert Lottermoser, Christos Christodoulou, Uroš Nikolić

4 March 2020 27	ALBA Berlin (Germany)	80–84	(Spain) Barcelona	Berlin
20:00	Scoring by quarter: 18–27, 28–11, 16–28, 18–18
	Pts: Hermannsson 17; Rebs: Sikma 11; Asts: Sikma 4 PIR: Sikma 23	Boxscore	Pts: Abrines 17; Rebs: four players 5 Asts: Higgins 7 PIR: Abrines 21	Arena: Mercedes-Benz Arena; Attendance: 8,797 (tentative); Referees: Carmelo Paternicò, Tomasz Trawicki, Rain Peerandi

6 March 2020 28	Barcelona (Spain)	83–80	(Germany) Bayern Munich	Barcelona
21:00	Scoring by quarter: 21–21, 21–20, 15–27, 26–12
	Pts: Mirotić 28; Rebs: Mirotić 8 Asts: Higgins, Mirotić 4 PIR: Mirotić 37	Boxscore	Pts: Monroe 19; Rebs: Monroe 8 Asts: Zipser 4 PIR: Lučić 19	Arena: Palau Blaugrana; Attendance: 5,788; Referees: Matej Boltauzer, Milivoje Jovčić, Michele Rossi

29	Barcelona (Spain)	vs.	(Lithuania) Žalgiris	Barcelona
		Boxscore		Arena: Palau Blaugrana

30	Barcelona (Spain)	vs.	(Russia) Khimki	Barcelona
		Boxscore		Arena: Palau Blaugrana

31	LDLC ASVEL (France)	vs.	(Spain) Barcelona	Villeurbanne
		Boxscore		Arena: Astroballe

32	Barcelona (Spain)	vs.	(Spain) Kirolbet Baskonia	Barcelona
		Boxscore		Arena: Palau Blaugrana

33	Barcelona (Spain)	vs.	(Spain) Real Madrid	Barcelona
		Boxscore		Arena: Palau Blaugrana

34	Olympiacos (Greece)	vs.	(Spain) Barcelona	Piraeus
		Boxscore		Arena: Peace and Friendship Stadium

=== Copa del Rey ===
==== Quarterfinals ====
13 February 2020	Barça	78–82	Valencia Basket	Málaga
19:00	Scoring by quarter: 18–19, 20–22, 14–23, 26–18
	Pts: Mirotić 25; Rebs: Mirotić 8 Asts: Delaney 8 PIR: Mirotić 24	Boxscore	Pts: Tobey 16; Rebs: Abalde 9 Asts: Doornekamp, San Emeterio 4 PIR: Tobey 22	Arena: Martín Carpena; Attendance: 9,857; Referees: Emilio Pérez Pizarro, Carlos Cortés, Luis Castillo

=== Supercopa de España ===
==== Semifinals ====
21 September 2019	Barça	71–65	Valencia Basket	Madrid
18:30	Scoring by quarter: 15–15, 14–17, 20–17, 22–16
	Pts: Higgins 15; Rebs: Mirotić, Tomić 5 Asts: Pangos 5 PIR: Claver 15	Boxscore	Pts: Marinković 17; Rebs: Dubljević 6 Asts: Vives 5 PIR: Marinković 12	Arena: WiZink Center; Attendance: 11,018; Referees: Daniel Hierrezuelo, Carlos Cortés, Raúl Zamorano

==== Final ====
22 September 2019	Real Madrid	89–79	Barça	Madrid
19:00	Scoring by quarter: 21–20, 27–13, 21–30, 20–16
	Pts: Campazzo 16; Rebs: Mickey 7 Asts: Campazzo 5 PIR: Campazzo 22	Boxscore	Pts: Davies 23; Rebs: Mirotić 6 Asts: Pangos 5 PIR: Davies 20	Arena: WiZink Center; Attendance: 12,348; Referees: Daniel Hierrezuelo, Carlos Peruga, Fernando Calatrava

== Statistics ==
Legend
GP	Games played	GS	Games started	MPG	Minutes per game
FG%	Field-goal percentage	3FG%	3-point field-goal percentage	FT%	Free-throw percentage
RPG	Rebounds per game	APG	Assists per game	SPG	Steals per game
BPG	Blocks per game	PPG	Points per game	PIR	PIR per game

=== Liga ACB ===
Player	GP	GS	MPG	2FG%	3FG%	FT%	RPG	APG	SPG	BPG	PPG	PIR
Álex Abrines	28	7	18:06	.552	.368	.722	2.2	0.5	0.6	0.2	5.5	4.2
Leandro Bolmaro	9	2	12:53	.439	.465	.859	1.0	1.7	0.7	0.3	5.1	4.0
Víctor Claver	20	18	19:44	.595	.341	.900	3.0	0.9	1.1	0.3	5.3	7.3
Brandon Davies	28	13	18:38	.555	.439	.760	4.5	1.0	0.9	0.4	11.3	13.1
Malcolm Delaney	19	6	22:28	.477	.388	.766	1.8	3.6	0.7	0.1	10.3	9.7
Ádám Hanga	27	24	21:08	.551	.293	.730	3.7	4.0	0.9	0.4	7.0	9.9
Thomas Heurtel	8	0	20:00	.563	.281	.833	2.4	5.6	0.9	0.0	8.4	9.5
Cory Higgins	22	18	25:00	.477	.318	.802	1.8	2.0	1.2	0.0	11.0	9.7
Kyle Kuric	30	5	21:01	.541	.368	.902	2.1	1.1	1.0	0.1	8.8	8.2
Sergi Martínez	2	0	3:37	.000	.000	.000	0.0	0.0	0.0	0.0	0.0	–0.5
Nikola Mirotić	25	24	25:51	.637	.324	.897	5.2	1.4	1.1	0.7	19.0	22.7
Pierre Oriola	28	5	18:02	.670	.301	.439	5.0	0.8	0.4	0.1	5.9	8.3
Kevin Pangos	1	0	10:28	.000	.667	.000	1.0	2.0	0.0	0.0	6.0	5.0
Artem Pustovyi	7	0	8:58	.765	.000	.902	2.1	0.4	0.1	0.3	5.0	6.0
Pau Ribas	12	6	18:13	.500	.413	.904	1.4	3.2	0.7	0.1	4.8	7.1
Rolands Šmits	17	5	9:51	.695	.190	.815	1.5	0.4	0.5	0.1	3.1	2.4
Ante Tomić	28	17	19:43	.658	.000	.660	5.0	1.4	1.1	0.2	9.5	13.6

Source: ACB

=== EuroLeague ===
Player	GP	GS	MPG	2FG%	3FG%	FT%	RPG	APG	SPG	BPG	PPG	PIR
Álex Abrines	25	3	14:49	.469	.462	.833	2.1	0.4	0.6	0.1	5.2	4.9
Leandro Bolmaro	6	1	9:12	.286	.000	1.000	0.8	2.3	1.0	0.0	1.8	1.0
Víctor Claver	17	15	21:11	.556	.455	1.000	3.0	1.6	0.8	0.2	5.7	7.9
Brandon Davies	28	14	20:06	.524	.385	.786	3.9	1.6	1.1	0.6	9.6	10.3
Malcolm Delaney	26	6	22:28	.468	.430	.683	2.2	4.8	0.7	0.1	10.2	11.0
Ádám Hanga	28	25	20:15	.573	.276	.750	2.9	3.4	0.7	0.2	5.8	7.9
Thomas Heurtel	3	0	13:21	.333	.400	1.000	2.3	4.7	0.3	0.0	5.3	7.3
Cory Higgins	23	20	26:35	.483	.400	.817	2.1	2.7	0.7	0.1	12.4	11.7
Kyle Kuric	27	3	19:22	.500	.443	.892	2.1	0.9	0.7	0.1	9.4	8.9
Nikola Mirotić	28	28	27:50	.610	.331	.869	6.9	1.6	1.1	0.3	19.0	22.5
Pierre Oriola	28	0	14:36	.676	.500	.556	2.1	0.6	0.3	0.1	3.8	4.4
Artem Pustovyi	1	0	3:44	.000	.000	.000	1.0	0.0	0.0	0.0	0.0	–1.0
Pau Ribas	12	1	9:21	.429	.188	.571	1.2	1.5	0.3	0.0	1.6	2.2
Rolands Šmits	16	10	9:54	.417	.474	.750	1.8	0.3	0.1	0.1	3.1	2.2
Ante Tomić	28	14	16:30	.586	.000	.605	4.0	1.0	0.4	0.3	5.7	7.5

Source: EuroLeague

=== Copa del Rey ===
Player	GP	GS	MPG	2FG%	3FG%	FT%	RPG	APG	SPG	BPG	PPG	PIR
Álex Abrines	1	0	11:30	1.000	.000	.000	1.0	0.0	0.0	0.0	2.0	–1.0
Víctor Claver	1	1	25:36	.000	.833	.000	4.0	3.0	1.0	1.0	15.0	20.0
Brandon Davies	1	0	13:43	.200	.000	.750	4.0	0.0	0.0	0.0	5.0	4.0
Malcolm Delaney	1	1	30:00	.000	.333	.500	6.0	8.0	0.0	0.0	10.0	12.0
Ádám Hanga	1	0	15:10	.000	.500	.000	3.0	2.0	0.0	0.0	3.0	6.0
Cory Higgins	1	1	29:42	.286	.167	.750	3.0	2.0	0.0	0.0	10.0	4.0
Kyle Kuric	1	0	8:19	.000	.000	.000	0.0	0.0	0.0	0.0	0.0	–5.0
Nikola Mirotić	1	1	31:45	.667	.364	.833	8.0	1.0	2.0	0.0	25.0	24.0
Pierre Oriola	1	0	18:10	1.000	.000	.000	2.0	2.0	0.0	0.0	2.0	3.0
Ante Tomić	1	1	16:02	1.000	.000	.000	4.0	1.0	1.0	1.0	6.0	8.0

Source: ACB

=== Supercopa de España ===
Player	GP	GS	MPG	2FG%	3FG%	FT%	RPG	APG	SPG	BPG	PPG	PIR
Víctor Claver	2	2	16:54	.500	.500	.500	4.5	1.5	0.5	0.0	7.0	10.0
Brandon Davies	2	1	23:37	.619	.000	.500	4.0	2.0	1.5	0.5	14.5	15.0
Malcolm Delaney	2	0	20:23	.286	.500	.800	3.0	2.0	0.0	0.0	10.5	12.0
Ádám Hanga	2	0	16:22	.000	.250	.000	2.0	0.0	0.0	0.5	1.5	2.0
Cory Higgins	2	2	30:21	.438	.111	1.000	3.5	2.0	1.5	0.5	14.0	12.5
Kyle Kuric	2	0	17:28	.500	.200	1.000	1.5	1.0	0.0	0.5	4.5	5.0
Nikola Mirotić	2	2	24:22	.539	.273	.833	5.5	0.0	0.5	0.0	14.0	10.5
Pierre Oriola	2	0	11:33	.500	.000	.000	1.5	0.0	0.5	0.5	1.0	2.0
Kevin Pangos	2	2	18:26	.667	.143	.000	2.0	5.0	1.0	0.0	3.5	5.5
Rolands Šmits	2	0	4:01	.333	.000	.000	0.5	0.0	0.0	0.0	1.0	–1.0
Ante Tomić	2	1	16:20	.167	.000	.833	4.5	0.5	0.0	0.0	3.5	2.5

Source: ACB

== Individual awards ==
=== Liga ACB ===
Season MVP

- (Spain) Nikola Mirotić

All-Liga ACB First Team

- (Spain) Nikola Mirotić

All-Liga ACB Second Team

- (Hungary) Ádám Hanga

Player of the Round

- (Spain) Nikola Mirotić – Round 1, Round 4
- (Uganda) Brandon Davies – Round 2

Player of the Month

- (Uganda) Brandon Davies – September
- (Spain) Nikola Mirotić – October, January

=== EuroLeague ===
MVP of the Round

- (United States) Cory Higgins – Round 7
- (Spain) Nikola Mirotić – Round 10, Round 23
- (United States) Malcolm Delaney – Round 24

MVP of the Month

- (Spain) Nikola Mirotić – December, February
