= Obi Enechionyia =

Nigerian-American former professional basketball player

Personal information
- Born: September 19, 1995 (age 31) Springfield, Virginia
- Listed height: 6 ft 8 in (2.03 m)
- Listed weight: 220 lb (100 kg)

Career information
- High school: St. James School (Hagerstown, Maryland)
- College: Temple (2014–2018)
- NBA draft: 2018: undrafted
- Playing career: 2018–2023
- Position: Power forward / center
- Number: 0

Career history
- 2018–2021: Real Betis
- 2021: Iraklis Thessaloniki
- 2021–2022: Alliance Sport Alsace
- 2022–2023: San Pablo Burgos

Obi Enechionyia (born September 19, 1995) is a former Nigerian-American professional basketball player. He competed in college for Temple.

== Early life ==
Enechionyia's father grew up in Nigeria before moving to the U.S. He has two brothers, Nnamdi and Chu, who also played Division I basketball. Enechionyia first began playing basketball in eighth grade, focusing on soccer beforehand. He attended St. James School and was a four-star recruit.

== College career ==
As a freshman, Enechionyia averaged 5.0 points and 3.5 rebounds per game on a Temple squad that participated in the 2015 NIT. He had 17 points, eight rebounds and five blocks in a season-ending loss to Miami in the NIT semifinals. Coming into his sophomore season, Enechionyia sprained his ankle and missed a game against North Carolina and was limited through the first half of the season. Enechionyia averaged 11.0 points and 3.8 rebounds per game as a sophomore. He helped Temple to a 21–12 record and berth in the NCAA Tournament, where the team lost a close game to Iowa in the first round.

In the NIT Season Tipoff, Enechionyia recorded 16 points, eight rebounds, and six blocks against Florida State and 22 points, 12 rebounds, and five blocks against West Virginia. He was named Tournament MVP. He had a season-high 26 points against St. Joseph's in a 78–72 win on November 30, 2016. As a junior, Enechionyia was second on the team in scoring with 13.1 points per game while leading the team in rebounding with 5.8 rebounds per game. He shot 41 percent from floor and 39 percent from behind the arc on a team that finished 16–16. After the season, Enechionyia declared for the 2017 NBA draft, but ultimately returned for his senior year.

Enechionyia was named MVP of the Charleston Classic after recording 12 points in the title game against Clemson. Enechionyia scored a career-high 27 points in an 84–66 loss to Georgia on December 22, 2017. As a senior, Enechionyia averaged 10.8 points and 5.8 rebounds per game. He was selected to be the 2018 American Athletic Conference Scholar Athlete of the Year. After the season, he participated in the Portsmouth Invitational Tournament. Enechionyia finished his Temple career with 1,296 points and 613 rebounds. He graduated with a degree in communications.

== Professional career ==
After going undrafted, Enechionyia signed with the Detroit Pistons in the NBA Summer League. On August 31, 2018, he signed a two-year deal with Real Betis Energía Plus of the Spanish LEB Oro. Enechionyia averaged 5.3 points per game during the 2019–20 season. He re-signed with the team on July 27, 2020.

On January 13, 2021, Enechionyia agreed to terms with Greek club Iraklis Thessaloniki. He averaged 6.3 points and 4.7 rebounds per game. On August 14, 2021, Enechionyia signed with Alliance Sport Alsace of the LNB Pro B.

On July 27, 2022, he signed with San Pablo Burgos of the LEB Oro.
