= Leandro Bolmaro =

Argentine-Italian basketball player (born 2000)

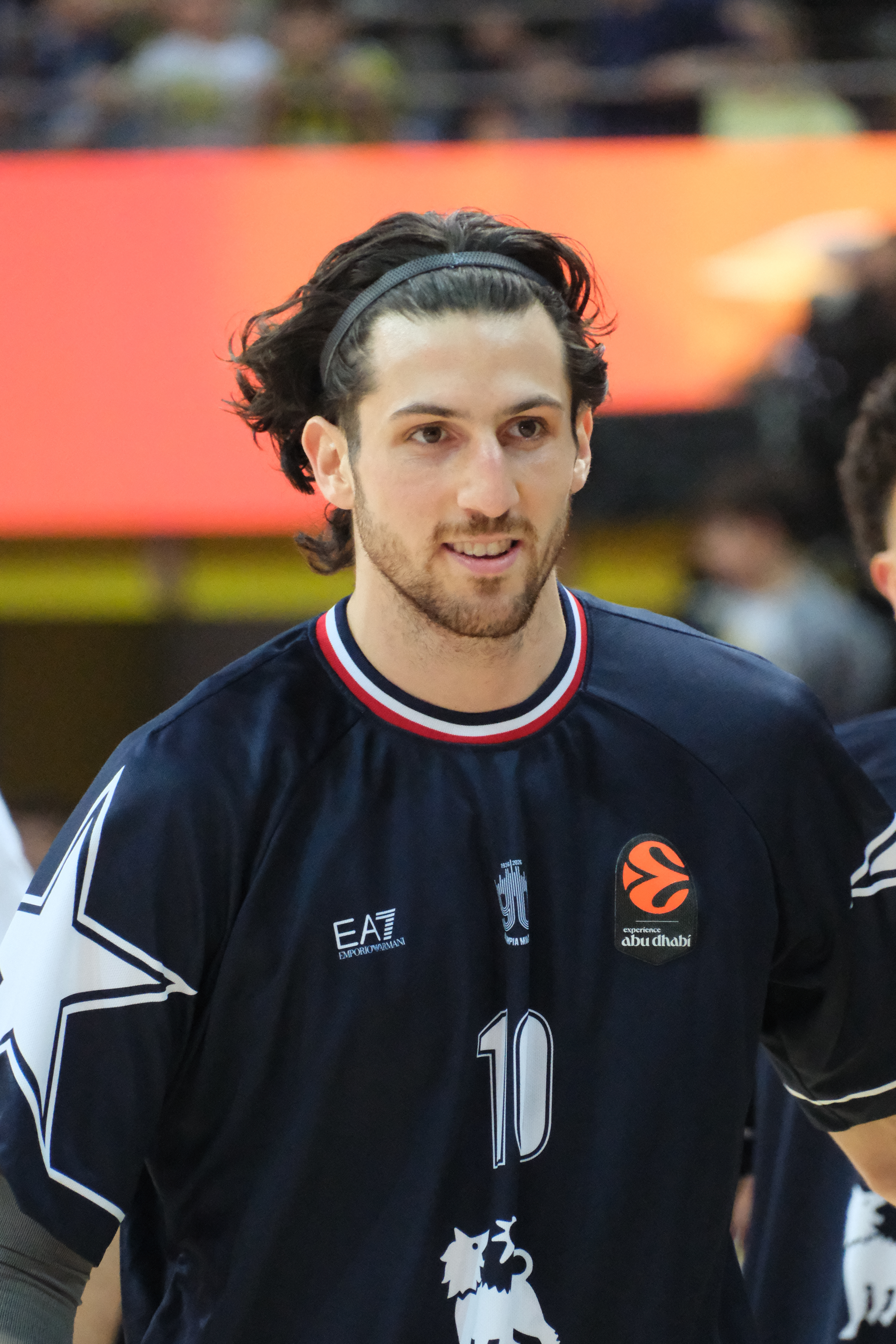
- Bolmaro with Olimpia Milano in 2026

No. 10 – Olimpia Milano
- Position: Guard / small forward
- League: Lega Basket Serie A EuroLeague

Personal information
- Born: 11 September 2000 (age 26) Las Varillas, Argentina
- Listed height: 6 ft 7 in (2.01 m)
- Listed weight: 200 lb (91 kg)

Career information
- NBA draft: 2020: 1st round, 23rd overall pick
- Drafted by: New York Knicks
- Playing career: 2017–present

Career history
- 2017–2018: Estudiantes de Bahía Blanca
- 2018–2021: FC Barcelona
- 2018–2020: →FC Barcelona B
- 2021–2022: Minnesota Timberwolves
- 2021–2022: →Iowa Wolves
- 2022–2023: Utah Jazz
- 2022–2023: →Salt Lake City Stars
- 2023: Tenerife
- 2023–2024: Bayern Munich
- 2024–present: Olimpia Milano

Career highlights
- Lega Serie A champion (2026); Italian Cup winner (2026); 3× Italian Supercup winner (2024–2026); Lega Serie A Defensive Player of the Year (2026); BBL champion (2024); German Cup winner (2024); Liga ACB champion (2021); Spanish Cup winner (2021); Liga ACB Most Spectacular Player (2021)
- Stats at NBA.com
- Stats at Basketball Reference
Medals
Men's basketball
Representing Argentina
FIBA AmeriCup
Gold medal – first place	2022 Brazil
FIBA U-17 South American Championship
Silver medal – second place	2017 Peru

Leandro Nicolás Bolmaro (born 11 September 2000) is an Argentine-Italian professional basketball player for Olimpia Milano of the Italian Lega Basket Serie A (LBA) and the EuroLeague. He also represents the senior Argentina national team.

== Early years and youth career ==
Bolmaro began playing the sport of basketball in his home country of Argentina. He started playing with the youth teams of a local sports club named Almafuerte from Las Varillas town in Córdoba. On 13 April 2018, he played for the World Team at the Nike Hoop Summit in Portland, Oregon.

== Professional career ==
=== Estudiantes de Bahía Blanca (2017–2018) ===
Bolmaro began his pro career on 16 July 2017, when he was 16 years old, after he signed with Estudiantes de Bahía Blanca of the Liga Nacional de Básquet, the top basketball league in Argentina. In 23 games played during the 2017–18 season, Bolmaro averaged 2.0 points, 0.7 rebounds, 0.5 assists, and 0.4 steals, in 7.2 minutes per game. He shot 37.3% overall from the field, 53.6% on 2-point field goals, 17.4% on 3-point field goals, and 75.0% on free throws.

=== Barcelona (2018–2021) ===
For the 2018–19 LEB Oro season, Bolmaro moved to the Spanish club FC Barcelona. He averaged 10.4 points, 3.1 rebounds, 2.7 assists, and 1.2 steals per game for the club reserve team while playing in the LEB Oro, Spain's second-tier level league. With the reserve team, he played in a total of 33 games and averaged 24.1 minutes per game of playing time. He shot 39.6% overall from the field, 45.5% on 2-point field goals, 30.8% on 3-point field goals, and 65.2% on free throws.

In 2019–20 FC Barcelona Bàsquet season, he split playing time between Barcelona's reserve team and senior team, which competed in the Liga ACB, the highest level Spanish league, and the EuroLeague. During the 2019–20 Spanish 3rd Division season, while playing with Barcelona's reserve B team, he averaged 14.9 points, 2.7 rebounds, 3.6 assists, and 1.8 steals, in 26.3 minutes per game, in 9 games played in the Spanish 3rd Division. On 13 August 2020, Bolmaro signed a contract extension with Barcelona through 2023. After getting selected in the NBA draft, Bolmaro opted to stay with FC Barcelona.

In September 2021, Bolmaro paid his buyout clause in order to leave Barcelona and subsequently be able to sign a 4-year rookie-scale contract with the Minnesota Timberwolves.

=== Minnesota Timberwolves (2021–2022) ===
In the 2020 NBA draft, Bolmaro was selected by the New York Knicks with the 23rd overall selection, but his draft rights were traded to the Minnesota Timberwolves in a three-team trade. On 18 September 2021, Bolmaro signed a 4-year, $11.8M rookie contract with the Timberwolves. Bolmaro made his NBA debut on 20 October 2021 in the Timberwolves 124–106 win against the Houston Rockets. He hadn't seen many minutes before 27 November 2021, in which he played a career-high 17 minutes against the Philadelphia 76ers.

=== Utah Jazz (2022–2023) ===
On 6 July 2022, Bolmaro was traded along with Malik Beasley, Jarred Vanderbilt, Patrick Beverley, the draft rights to Walker Kessler, four future first-round picks, and a pick swap to the Utah Jazz in exchange for Rudy Gobert. On 16 February 2023, Bolmaro reached a contract buyout agreement with the Jazz, and he was subsequently waived.

=== Lenovo Tenerife (2023) ===
On 2 March 2023, Bolmaro signed with Lenovo Tenerife of the Liga ACB.

=== Bayern Munich (2023–2024) ===
On 19 July 2023, Bolmaro signed with Bayern Munich. On 6 July 2024, he opted out of his contract with the German club.

== National team career ==
=== Junior national team ===
In 2017, Bolmaro won a silver medal with Argentina's Under-17 national team at the FIBA South America Under-17 Championship in Lima, Peru. He averaged a team-high 13.8 points per game. Bolmaro also represented the Argentine Under-19 national team at the 2019 FIBA Under-19 World Cup in Heraklion, Greece, where his team finished in 11th place. He left the tournament's opening game early with a minor strain. During the tournament, he was Argentina's leading scorer, with an average of 10.8 points per game.

=== Senior national team ===
On 29 July 2021, Bolmaro scored 2 points in a loss to the Spain men's national basketball team at the 2020 Summer Olympics in Tokyo, Japan.

In 2022, Bolmaro won the gold medal with the senior team in the 2022 FIBA AmeriCup held in Recife, Brazil. He was one of Argentina's shooting guards in the tournament.

== Career statistics ==
Legend
GP	Games played	GS	Games started	MPG	Minutes per game
FG%	Field-goal percentage	3P%	3-point field-goal percentage	FT%	Free-throw percentage
RPG	Rebounds per game	APG	Assists per game	SPG	Steals per game
BPG	Blocks per game	PPG	Points per game	PIR	Performance index rating
**Bold**	Career high

=== NBA ===
Year	Team	GP	GS	MPG	FG%	3P%	FT%	RPG	APG	SPG	BPG	PPG
2021–22	Minnesota	**35**	**2**	**6.9**	**.315**	**.278**	.846	**1.2**	**.6**	**.2**	.0	**1.4**
2022–23	Utah	14	0	4.9	.150	.000	—	.5	.5	**.2**	**.1**	.4
Career		49	2	6.3	.270	.227	.846	1.0	.6	.2	.0	1.1

=== EuroLeague ===
Year	Team	GP	GS	MPG	FG%	3P%	FT%	RPG	APG	SPG	BPG	PPG	PIR
2019–20	Barcelona	6	1	9.2	.286	.000	**1.000**	.8	2.3	**1.0**	**.3**	1.8	1.0
2020–21	Barcelona	**30**	0	9.8	.408	**.381**	.786	1.1	1.3	.3	.1	2.9	2.6
2023–24	Bayern Munich	**30**	**28**	**19.8**	**.486**	.302	.732	**2.8**	**3.4**	**1.0**	**.3**	**8.4**	**9.2**
Career		66	29	14.3	.450	.304	.764	1.8	2.3	.7	.2	5.3	5.5

=== Basketball Champions League ===
Year	Team	GP	GS	MPG	FG%	3P%	FT%	RPG	APG	SPG	BPG	PPG
2022–23	Canarias	7	2	14.2	.480	.444	.786	1.6	.9	—	.3	5.6
Career		7	2	14.2	.480	.444	.786	1.6	.9	—	.3	5.6

=== Domestic leagues ===
Year	Team	League	GP	MPG	FG%	3P%	FT%	RPG	APG	SPG	BPG	PPG
2017–18	(Argentina) Est. de Bahía Blanca	LNB	25	7.1	.373	.174	.750	.6	.5	.4	—	1.8
2018–19	(Spain) Barcelona B	LEB Oro	33	24.1	.396	.308	.652	3.1	2.7	1.2	.3	10.4
2019–20	(Spain) Barcelona B	LEB Plata	9	26.8	.450	.281	.643	2.7	3.6	1.8	—	14.9
2019–20	(Spain) Barcelona	ACB	9	12.9	.447	.462	.857	1.0	1.7	.7	.3	5.1
2020–21	(Spain) Barcelona	ACB	41	15.9	.492	.452	.838	1.5	1.8	.8	.2	6.7
2021–22	(United States) Iowa Wolves	G League	11	32.7	.434	.271	.900	5.1	5.7	1.4	.4	13.5
2022–23	(United States) Salt Lake City Stars	G League	7	33.1	.478	.382	.556	6.1	6.4	1.0	.9	12.1
2022–23	(Spain) Canarias	ACB	16	15.1	.407	.250	.739	2.0	.9	.7	.3	6.0
2023–24	(Germany) Bayern Munich	BBL	41	19.6	.477	.385	.800	2.7	2.8	.6	.1	7.7
