= Pepe Pozas =

Spanish basketball player

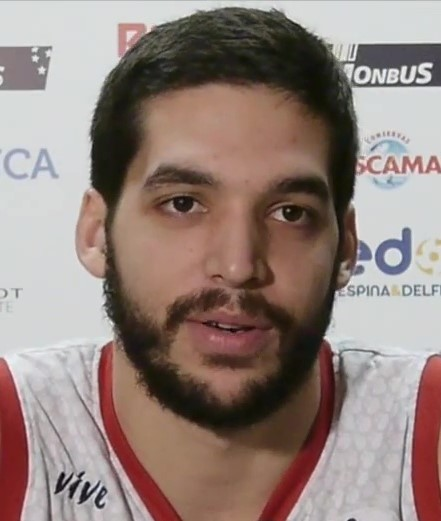
- Pozas in 2014

Retired
- Position: Point guard

Personal information
- Born: May 14, 1992 (age 34)
- Listed height: 6 ft 0 in (1.83 m)
- Listed weight: 187 lb (85 kg)

Career information
- Playing career: 2008–present

Career history
- 2008–2012: Unicaja Malaga
- 2008–2010: → Unicaja Malaga II
- 2009–2012: → CB Axarquía
- 2012–2014: CB Axarquía
- 2014: Blancos de Rueda Valladolid
- 2014–2021: Monbus Obradoiro
- 2021–2023: Coosur Real Betis

José Pozas Checa (born May 14, 1992) is a Spanish professional basketball player for Real Betis Baloncesto of the Liga ACB.
