= Pierre Oriola =

Spanish basketball player (born 1992)

No. 29 – Bàsquet Manresa
- Position: Power forward / center
- League: Liga ACB

Personal information
- Born: September 25, 1992 (age 34) Tàrrega, Spain
- Listed height: 6 ft 10 in (2.08 m)
- Listed weight: 235 lb (107 kg)

Career information
- NBA draft: 2014: undrafted
- Playing career: 2009–present

Career history
- 2009–2013: Manresa
- 2010–2011: → Sant Nicolau
- 2012–2013: → Força Lleida
- 2013–2014: Huesca
- 2014–2016: Sevilla
- 2016–2017: Valencia
- 2017–2022: FC Barcelona
- 2022–2023: Girona
- 2023: AEK Athens
- 2023–2024: Manresa
- 2024–2025: Força Lleida
- 2025: Fuerza Regia de Monterrey
- 2025–present: Manresa
Medals
Representing Spain
World Cup
Gold medal – first place	2019 China	Team
EuroBasket
Bronze medal – third place	2017 Finland–Israel–Romania–Turkey
European U-20 Championship
Bronze medal – third place	2012 Slovenia	Team

Pierre David Oriola Garriga (alternate spelling: Pere Oriola; born 25 September 1992) is a Spanish professional basketball player for Bàsquet Manresa of the Liga ACB. He can play at both the power forward and center positions.

== Professional career ==
Oriola started playing basketball in his hometown team, Club Natació Tàrrega. In 2009 he began his pro career with the Spanish First Division senior team of Manresa. He then played on loan in the Spanish amateur level Liga EBA, with CE Saint Nicolau, during the 2010–11 season. He then joined the Spanish 2nd Division club, Força Lleida, for the 2012–13 season.

He then moved to the Spanish 2nd Division club, Peñas Huesca, for the 2013–14 season. His next team was the first division Spanish club CB Sevilla. With Sevilla, he played in the 2nd-tier level European-wide league, the EuroCup, for the first time during the 2014–15 season.

He then moved to the first division Spanish club Valencia Basket. With Valencia, he won the Spanish League 2016–17 season championship.

On July 14, 2017, FC Barcelona Lassa paid a €1,000,000 contract buyout amount to Valencia Basket, in order to secure Oriola's player rights. Oriola subsequently signed a four-year deal with Barcelona. On July 7, 2020, Oriola renewed his contract with the club through 2024.

On October 15, 2022, he signed with Bàsquet Girona of Liga ACB.

On February 18, 2023, he signed a contract with AEK Athens of the Greek Basket League. In 8 domestic league games, he averaged 5.7 points, 4.8 rebounds and 1.2 assists, playing around 20 minutes per contest.

On November 14, 2025, he was announced as a Bàsquet Manresa player, returning to the club with which he started his professional career for a third stint. On March 19, 2026, he signed a contract extension with Manresa, linking him to the Catalans until 2028.

== Spain national team ==
Oriola was a member of the Spain junior national teams. With Spain's junior national teams, he played at the 2010 FIBA Europe Under-18 Championship, and at the 2012 FIBA Europe Under-20 Championship, where he won a bronze medal.

He has also been a member of the senior Spain national team. With Spain's senior team he played at the EuroBasket 2017 winning a bronze medal, and a gold medal in the 2019 FIBA Basketball World Cup in China.

== Career statistics ==
Legend
GP	Games played	GS	Games started	MPG	Minutes per game
FG%	Field-goal percentage	3P%	3-point field-goal percentage	FT%	Free-throw percentage
RPG	Rebounds per game	APG	Assists per game	SPG	Steals per game
BPG	Blocks per game	PPG	Points per game	PIR	Performance index rating
**Bold**	Career high

=== EuroLeague ===
*	Led the league

Year	Team	GP	GS	MPG	FG%	3P%	FT%	RPG	APG	SPG	BPG	PPG	PIR
2017–18	Barcelona	27	5	**18.8**	.563	.469	.746	3.5	.6	.3	**.3**	**8.3**	**8.4**
2018–19	Barcelona	35	1	17.2	.467	.289	.613	3.5	.7	.3	**.3**	5.5	5.8
2019–20	Barcelona	28*	0	14.6	.600	**.500**	.556	2.1	.6	.3	.1	3.8	4.4
2020–21	Barcelona	**38**	**20**	15.0	.565	**.500**	.589	**3.6**	.8	.2	**.3**	5.4	5.7
2021–22	Barcelona	14	3	13.4	**.645**	**.500**	**1.000**	3.1	**1.1**	**.4**	**.3**	3.4	5.3
Career		142	29	16.0	.546	.413	.646	3.2	.7	.3	.3	5.4	5.9
