= Jeremy Senglin =

American basketball player (born 1995)

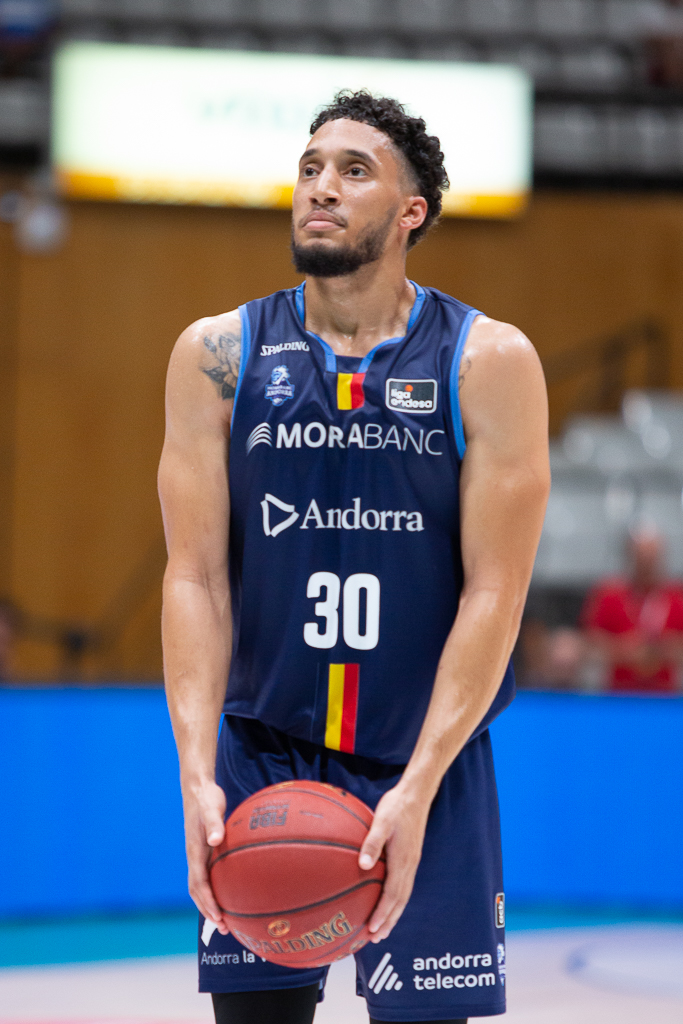
- Senglin with MoraBanc Andorra in 2019

No. 30 – Universo Treviso Basket
- Position: Point guard / shooting guard
- League: Lega Basket Serie A

Personal information
- Born: March 24, 1995 (age 31) Kansas City, Missouri, U.S.
- Listed height: 6 ft 2 in (1.88 m)
- Listed weight: 190 lb (86 kg)

Career information
- High school: Bowie (Arlington, Texas)
- College: Weber State (2013–2017)
- NBA draft: 2017: undrafted
- Playing career: 2017–present

Career history
- 2017–2018: Long Island Nets
- 2018: MHP Riesen Ludwigsburg
- 2018–2019: Nanterre 92
- 2019–2021: MoraBanc Andorra
- 2021–2022: Nanterre 92
- 2022–2023: Fuenlabrada
- 2023: Pallacanestro Reggiana
- 2023–2024: New Basket Brindisi
- 2024: Hapoel Eilat
- 2024–2025: Śląsk Wrocław
- 2025–2026: Nanterre 92
- 2026–present: Universo Treviso Basket

Career highlights
- Polish Supercup winner (2024); 2× First-team All-Big Sky (2016, 2017); Big Sky Freshman of the Year (2014); Big Sky tournament MVP (2016)
- Stats at Basketball Reference

Jeremy Senglin (born March 24, 1995) is an American professional basketball player for Universo Treviso Basket of the Italian Lega Basket Serie A (LBA). He played college basketball for Weber State University.

== College career ==
Senglin came to Weber State from James Bowie High School in Arlington, Texas. He was named first-team All-Big Sky Conference as a junior and senior. On March 10, 2017, Senglin became the second player in school history, and the fourth in conference history, to eclipse the 2,000 career point mark. He finished as Weber State's all-time leading scorer at the time he graduated. He also left as Weber State's and the Big Sky's career leader in 3-pointers made with 345. Set a school and Big Sky single-season record by making 132 3-pointers during his senior year, the most 3-pointers of any player in the country. He finished second in the nation in 3-pointers per game at 3.9, and was sixth in the country in 3-point percentage at 44.7 percent. Led the Wildcats in points, field goals made, 3-pointers made, free throws made, minutes played, assists, and steals. He was twice a part of Big Sky regular season and tournament championship teams and twice played in the NCAA Tournament.

=== College awards and honors ===
- 2× First-team All-Big Sky Conference (2016, 2017)
- 2× Big Sky All-Tournament Team (2016, 2017)
- 2nd All-time leading scorer in Wildcat history (2,078 points)
- 2nd leading scorer in Big Sky history (2017)
- NABC All-District (6) First Team (2017)
- NABC All-District (6) Second Team (2016)
- Gulf Coast Showcase MVP (2016)
- Gulf Coast Showcase All-Tournament Team (2016)
- Big Sky tournament MVP (2016)
- Big Sky Freshman of the Year (2014)

== Professional career ==
Following the close of his college career, Senglin played in the Portsmouth Invitational Tournament. After a strong showing there, he was invited to join the Brooklyn Nets' Summer League team. On August 4, he signed with the Nets to a training camp deal. On October 11 he was waived by Brooklyn. Senglin then signed with Brooklyn's NBA G League team, the Long Island Nets. He played 48 games, averaging 14.5 points and 2.6 assists per game. Senglin set the Long Island franchise single-game scoring record on January 24, 2018, by scoring 40 points against the Maine Red Claws.

On April 7, 2018, Senglin was reported to have signed with MHP Riesen Ludwigsburg of the Basketball Bundesliga.

On June 26, 2019, Senglin signed a contract with MoraBanc Andorra of the Liga ACB. He averaged 7.9 points on 43.6% three-point shooting and 2.4 assists per game. Senglin re-signed with MoraBanc Andorra on July 15, 2020. He averaged 11.3 points, 2.5 rebounds, and 1.8 assists per game.

On July 13, 2021, Senglin signed with Nanterre 92 of the LNB Pro A.

On August 4, 2022, he has signed with Fuenlabrada of the Liga ACB.

On July 1, 2023, he signed with New Basket Brindisi of the Lega Basket Serie A.

On August 20, 2024, he signed with Śląsk Wrocław of the Polish Basketball League (PLK).

On August 4, 2025, he signed with Nanterre 92 of the LNB Pro A.

On October 17, 2026, he signed with Universo Treviso Basket of the Italian Lega Basket Serie A (LBA).
