= 2016 BBL Playoffs =

German basketball postseason

Tournament details
- Country: Germany
- Dates: 7 May –12 June 2016
- Season: 2015–16
- Teams: 8

Final positions
- Champions: Brose Baskets

The 2016 BBL Playoffs was the concluding postseason of the 2015–16 Basketball Bundesliga season. The Playoffs started on 7 May and ended on 12 June 2016.

== Playoff qualifying ==
Pos	Team	Pld	W	L	PF	PA	PD	Pts	Seeding
1	Brose Baskets	34	31	3	3053	2396	+657	62	Seeded teams
2	EWE Baskets Oldenburg	34	27	7	2861	2656	+205	54	Seeded teams
3	Skyliners Frankfurt	34	26	8	2688	2318	+370	52 (Note: Frankfurt 150–147 Munich)	Seeded teams
4	Bayern Munich	34	26	8	3096	2644	+452	52	Seeded teams
5	MHP Riesen Ludwigsburg	34	23	11	2799	2666	+133	46	Unseeded teams
6	Alba Berlin	34	22	12	2797	2518	+279	44	Unseeded teams
7	ratiopharm Ulm	34	21	13	2810	2687	+123	42	Unseeded teams
8	s.Oliver Baskets	34	17	17	2724	2793	−69	34	Unseeded teams

Source: Beko BBL

== Bracket ==
Quarterfinals
1	Brose Baskets	3
8	s.Oliver Baskets	0
4	Bayern Munich	3
5	MHP Riesen Ludwigsburg	2
3	Skyliners Frankfurt	3
6	Alba Berlin	0
2	EWE Baskets Oldenburg	1
7	ratiopharm Ulm	3

Semifinals
1	Brose Baskets	3
4	Bayern Munich	0
3	Skyliners Frankfurt	1
7	ratiopharm Ulm	3

Final
1	Brose Baskets	3
7	ratiopharm Ulm	0

== Quarterfinals ==
The quarterfinals were played in a best of five format from 7 to 19 May 2016.

=== Brose Baskets vs s.Oliver Baskets ===
8 May
20:30

Boxscore

Brose Baskets 95, s.Oliver Baskets 54
Scoring by quarter: 23–13, 25–13, 27–20, 20–8
Pts: Brad Wanamaker 19; Rebs: Daniel Theis 8 Asts: Brad Wanamaker 7	Pts: Devin Searcy 8 Rebs: Lamonte Ulmer 6 Asts: Dru Joyce 5
Bamberg leads series 1–0

Brose Arena, Bamberg
Attendance: 6,800
Referees: Martin Matip, Christof Madinger, Carsten Straube

12 May
20:00

Boxscore

s.Oliver Baskets 71, Brose Baskets 108
Scoring by quarter: 18–33, 11–20, 25–36, 17–19
Pts: Lamonte Ulmer 18; Rebs: Lane, Ulmer 5 Asts: Dru Joyce 6	Pts: Jānis Strēlnieks 19; Rebs: Harris, Miller 5 Asts: Brad Wanamaker 7
Bamberg leads series 2–0

s.Oliver Arena, Würzburg
Attendance: 3,140
Referees: Toni Rodriguez, Konstantin Simonow, Enrico Streit

15 May
17:00

Boxscore

Brose Baskets 93, s.Oliver Baskets 58
Scoring by quarter: 31–12, 25–15, 22–14, 15–17
Pts: Elias Harris 21; Rebs: Daniel Theis 10; Asts: Patrick Heckmann 6	Pts: Devin Searcy 10; Rebs: Ebert, Searcy 3 Asts: Dru Joyce 6
Bamberg wins series 3–0

Brose Arena, Bamberg
Attendance: 6,800
Referees: Clemens Fritz, Benjamin Barth, Steffen Neubecker

=== Bayern Munich vs MHP Riesen Ludwigsburg ===
7 May
19:30

Boxscore

Bayern Munich 97, MHP Riesen Ludwigsburg 80
Scoring by quarter: 21–27, 28–15, 34–21, 14–17
Pts: Nihad Đedović 22; Rebs: Maximilian Kleber 9 Asts: Alex Renfroe 8	Pts: Royce O'Neale 15; Rebs: Jon Brockman 8 Asts: Tekele Cotton 5
Munich leads series 1–0

Audi Dome, Munich
Attendance: 6,123
Referees: Moritz Reiter, Konstantin Simonow, Steffen Neubecker

10 May
20:00

Boxscore

MHP Riesen Ludwigsburg 93, Bayern Munich 74
Scoring by quarter: 22–29, 27–16, 22–18, 22–11
Pts: Jon Brockman 19; Rebs: Jon Brockman 9 Asts: Kerron Johnson 7	Pts: Alex Renfroe 15; Rebs: John Bryant 7 Asts: Alex Renfroe 4
Series tied, 1–1

Arena Ludwigsburg, Ludwigsburg
Attendance: 4,251
Referees: Robert Lottermoser, Johannes Hack, Nebojša Kovačević

14 May
20:30

Boxscore

Bayern Munich 79, MHP Riesen Ludwigsburg 68
Scoring by quarter: 19–14, 20–21, 19–18, 21–15
Pts: Bryce Taylor 19; Rebs: Maximilian Kleber 9 Asts: Alex Renfroe 8	Pts: Jon Brockman 14; Rebs: Royce O'Neale 7 Asts: Kerron Johnson 7
Munich leads series 2–1

Audi Dome, Munich
Attendance: 6,700
Referees: Anne Panther, Oliver Krause, Carsten Straube

17 May
20:30

Boxscore

MHP Riesen Ludwigsburg 75, Bayern Munich 69
Scoring by quarter: 17–16, 30–19, 13–14, 15–20
Pts: Shawn Huff 16; Rebs: Jon Brockman 8 Asts: Kerron Johnson 8	Pts: Maximilian Kleber 19; Rebs: three players 6 Asts: four players 3
Series tied, 2–2

Arena Ludwigsburg, Ludwigsburg
Attendance: 4,500
Referees: Martin Matip, Toni Rodriguez, Clemens Fritz

19 May
20:30

Boxscore

Bayern Munich 87, MHP Riesen Ludwigsburg 76
Scoring by quarter: 19–23, 23–18, 22–11, 23–24
Pts: Anton Gavel 24; Rebs: Maximilian Kleber 8 Asts: Alex Renfroe 8	Pts: Jon Brockman 23; Rebs: Jon Brockman 13; Asts: Kerron Johnson 9
Munich wins series 3–2

Audi Dome, Munich
Attendance: 5,400
Referees: Robert Lottermoser, Moritz Reiter, Anne Panther

=== Skyliners Frankfurt vs Alba Berlin ===
7 May
18:30

Boxscore

Skyliners Frankfurt 83, Alba Berlin 64
Scoring by quarter: 23–11, 17–20, 27–16, 16–17
Pts: Aaron Doornekamp 21; Rebs: Johannes Voigtmann 5 Asts: Jordan Theodore 4	Pts: Brandon Ashley 15; Rebs: three players 5 Asts: Jordan Taylor 4
Frankfurt leads series 1–0

Fraport Arena, Frankfurt
Attendance: 4,860
Referees: Robert Lottermoser, Oliver Krause, Enrico Streit

11 May
19:30

Boxscore

Alba Berlin 65, Skyliners Frankfurt 71
Scoring by quarter: 11–10, 12–22, 25–19, 17–20
Pts: Akpınar, Lowery 11; Rebs: four players 5 Asts: Will Cherry 4	Pts: Philip Scrubb 17; Rebs: Jordan Theodore 8 Asts: Jordan Theodore 5
Frankfurt leads series 2–0

Max-Schmeling-Halle, Berlin
Attendance: 7,312
Referees: Martin Matip, Benjamin Barth, Steffen Neubecker

14 May
18:30

Boxscore

Skyliners Frankfurt 87, Alba Berlin 66
Scoring by quarter: 23–17, 25–21, 22–12, 17–16
Pts: Jordan Theodore 15; Rebs: Danilo Barthel 6 Asts: Jordan Theodore 8	Pts: Alex King 15; Rebs: Dragan Milosavljević 6 Asts: Cherry, Taylor 4
Frankfurt wins series 3–0

Fraport Arena, Frankfurt
Attendance: 5,002
Referees: Moritz Reiter, Toni Rodriguez, Steve Bittner

=== EWE Baskets Oldenburg vs ratiopharm Ulm ===
7 May
17:30

Boxscore

EWE Baskets Oldenburg 81, ratiopharm Ulm 90
Scoring by quarter: 25–25, 16–23, 15–21, 25–21
Pts: Rickey Paulding 18; Rebs: Brian Qvale 8 Asts: Chris Kramer 7	Pts: Raymar Morgan 20; Rebs: Raymar Morgan 9 Asts: Per Günther 7
Ulm leads series 1–0

Große EWE Arena, Oldenburg
Attendance: 5,611
Referees: Anne Panther, Clemens Fritz, Johannes Hack

11 May
20:00

Boxscore

ratiopharm Ulm 85, EWE Baskets Oldenburg 80
Scoring by quarter: 17–21, 25–17, 18–22, 25–20
Pts: Per Günther 35; Rebs: Da'Sean Butler 9 Asts: Per Günther 9	Pts: Rickey Paulding 26; Rebs: four players 4 Asts: Chris Kramer 7
Ulm leads series 2–0

Arena Ulm/Neu-Ulm, Ulm
Attendance: 6,200
Referees: Moritz Reiter, Steve Bittner, Carsten Straube

14 May
17:30

Boxscore

EWE Baskets Oldenburg 87, ratiopharm Ulm 85
Scoring by quarter: 18–24, 35–18, 13–24, 21–19
Pts: Rickey Paulding 30; Rebs: Chris Kramer 9 Asts: Chris Kramer 5	Pts: Raymar Morgan 25; Rebs: Raymar Morgan 9 Asts: Per Günther 8
Ulm leads series 2–1

Große EWE Arena, Oldenburg
Attendance: 5,885
Referees: Martin Matip, Christof Madinger, Nebojša Kovačević

17 May
18:30

Boxscore

ratiopharm Ulm 80, EWE Baskets Oldenburg 79
Scoring by quarter: 22–24, 22–23, 10–18, 26–14
Pts: Raymar Morgan 24; Rebs: Raymar Morgan 13; Asts: Per Günther 5	Pts: Rickey Paulding 16; Rebs: Brian Qvale 9 Asts: Chris Kramer 9
Ulm wins series 3–1

Arena Ulm/Neu-Ulm, Ulm
Attendance: 6,200
Referees: Robert Lottermoser, Anne Panther, Oliver Krause

== Semifinals ==
The semifinals were played in a best of five format from 20 May to 2 June 2016.

=== Brose Baskets vs Bayern Munich ===
22 May
13:20

Boxscore

Brose Baskets 88, Bayern Munich 73
Scoring by quarter: 23–14, 19–18, 21–20, 25–21
Pts: Strēlnieks, Wanamaker 15; Rebs: Daniel Theis 8 Asts: Nikos Zisis 4	Pts: John Bryant 17; Rebs: Maximilian Kleber 8 Asts: three players 3
Bamberg leads series 1–0

Brose Arena, Bamberg
Attendance: 6,800
Referees: Toni Rodriguez, Clemens Fritz, Johannes Hack

25 May
20:30

Boxscore

Bayern Munich 76, Brose Baskets 90
Scoring by quarter: 18–14, 25–20, 19–26, 14–30
Pts: Anton Gavel 16; Rebs: three players 4 Asts: Alex Renfroe 4	Pts: Brad Wanamaker 28; Rebs: Daniel Theis 9 Asts: Brad Wanamaker 5
Bamberg leads series 2–0

Audi Dome, Munich
Attendance: 6,359
Referees: Robert Lottermoser, Anne Panther, Oliver Krause

29 May
19:30

Boxscore

Brose Baskets 96, Bayern Munich 65
Scoring by quarter: 24–10, 25–10, 26–22, 21–23
Pts: Daniel Theis 12; Rebs: Daniel Theis 5 Asts: Wanamaker, Zisis 7	Pts: Anton Gavel 13; Rebs: Kleber, Zipser 6 Asts: Justin Cobbs 4
Bamberg wins series 3–0

Brose Arena, Bamberg
Attendance: 6,800
Referees: Moritz Reiter, Clemens Fritz, Christof Madinger

=== Skyliners Frankfurt vs ratiopharm Ulm ===
20 May
20:00

Boxscore

Skyliners Frankfurt 86, ratiopharm Ulm 90 (OT)
Scoring by quarter: 17–18, 22–27, 20–15, 19–18, Overtime: 8–12
Pts: Jordan Theodore 22; Rebs: Barthel, Theodore 7 Asts: Quantez Robertson 7	Pts: Augustine Rubit 24; Rebs: Raymar Morgan 7 Asts: Chris Babb 4
Ulm leads series 1–0

Fraport Arena, Frankfurt
Attendance: 4,210
Referees: Oliver Krause, Benjamin Barth, Steve Bittner

24 May
20:30

Boxscore

ratiopharm Ulm 83, Skyliners Frankfurt 72
Scoring by quarter: 18–19, 12–13, 22–20, 31–20
Pts: Augustine Rubit 33; Rebs: Augustine Rubit 6 Asts: Babb, Günther 6	Pts: Johannes Voigtmann 12; Rebs: Mike Morrison 6 Asts: Jordan Theodore 5
Ulm leads series 2–0

Arena Ulm/Neu-Ulm, Ulm
Attendance: 6,200
Referees: Moritz Reiter, Christof Madinger, Konstantin Simonow

28 May
15:00

Boxscore

Skyliners Frankfurt 85, ratiopharm Ulm 54
Scoring by quarter: 20–21, 22–9, 21–6, 22–18
Pts: Jordan Theodore 12; Rebs: Aaron Doornekamp 7 Asts: Jordan Theodore 6	Pts: Babb, Günther 10; Rebs: Augustine Rubit 9 Asts: Pierria Henry 5
Ulm leads series 2–1

Fraport Arena, Frankfurt
Attendance: 5,000
Referees: Robert Lottermoser, Anne Panther, Johannes Hack

31 May
19:30

Boxscore

ratiopharm Ulm 73, Skyliners Frankfurt 72
Scoring by quarter: 15–13, 18–9, 21–13, 19–37
Pts: Per Günther 18; Rebs: Chris Babb 8 Asts: Chris Babb 6	Pts: Jordan Theodore 23; Rebs: three players 4 Asts: Jordan Theodore 6
Ulm wins series 3–1

Arena Ulm/Neu-Ulm, Ulm
Attendance: 6,200
Referees: Toni Rodriguez, Moritz Reiter, Clemens Fritz

== Final ==
The final will be played in a best of five format from 5 to 19 June 2016.

5 June
15:00

Boxscore

Brose Baskets 101, ratiopharm Ulm 82
Scoring by quarter: 23–22, 31–17, 22–19, 25–24
Pts: Darius Miller 26; Rebs: Daniel Theis 7 Asts: Nikos Zisis 8	Pts: Raymar Morgan 20; Rebs: Morgan, Rubit 7 Asts: Per Günther 6
Bamberg leads series 1–0

Brose Arena, Bamberg
Attendance: 6,800
Referees: Moritz Reiter, Benjamin Barth, Clemens Fritz

8 June
20:30

Boxscore

ratiopharm Ulm 90, Brose Baskets 92 (OT)
Scoring by quarter: 21–28, 22–11, 22–26, 17–17, Overtime: 8–10
Pts: Per Günther 20; Rebs: Babb, Henry 7 Asts: Per Günther 8	Pts: Brad Wanamaker 23; Rebs: Nicolò Melli 9 Asts: Brad Wanamaker 9
Bamberg leads series 2–0

Arena Ulm/Neu-Ulm, Ulm
Attendance: 6,200
Referees: Robert Lottermoser, Anne Panther, Johannes Hack

12 June
15:00

Boxscore

Brose Baskets 92, ratiopharm Ulm 65
Scoring by quarter: 25–17, 13–20, 27–12, 27–16
Pts: Miller, Wanamaker 19; Rebs: Darius Miller 6 Asts: Wanamaker, Zisis 6	Pts: Raymar Morgan 19; Rebs: Raymar Morgan 12; Asts: Babb, Henry 3
Bamberg wins series 3–0

Brose Arena, Bamberg
Attendance: 6,800
Referees: Robert Lottermoser, Toni Rodriguez, Oliver Krause
