= 2017 BBL-Pokal Final =

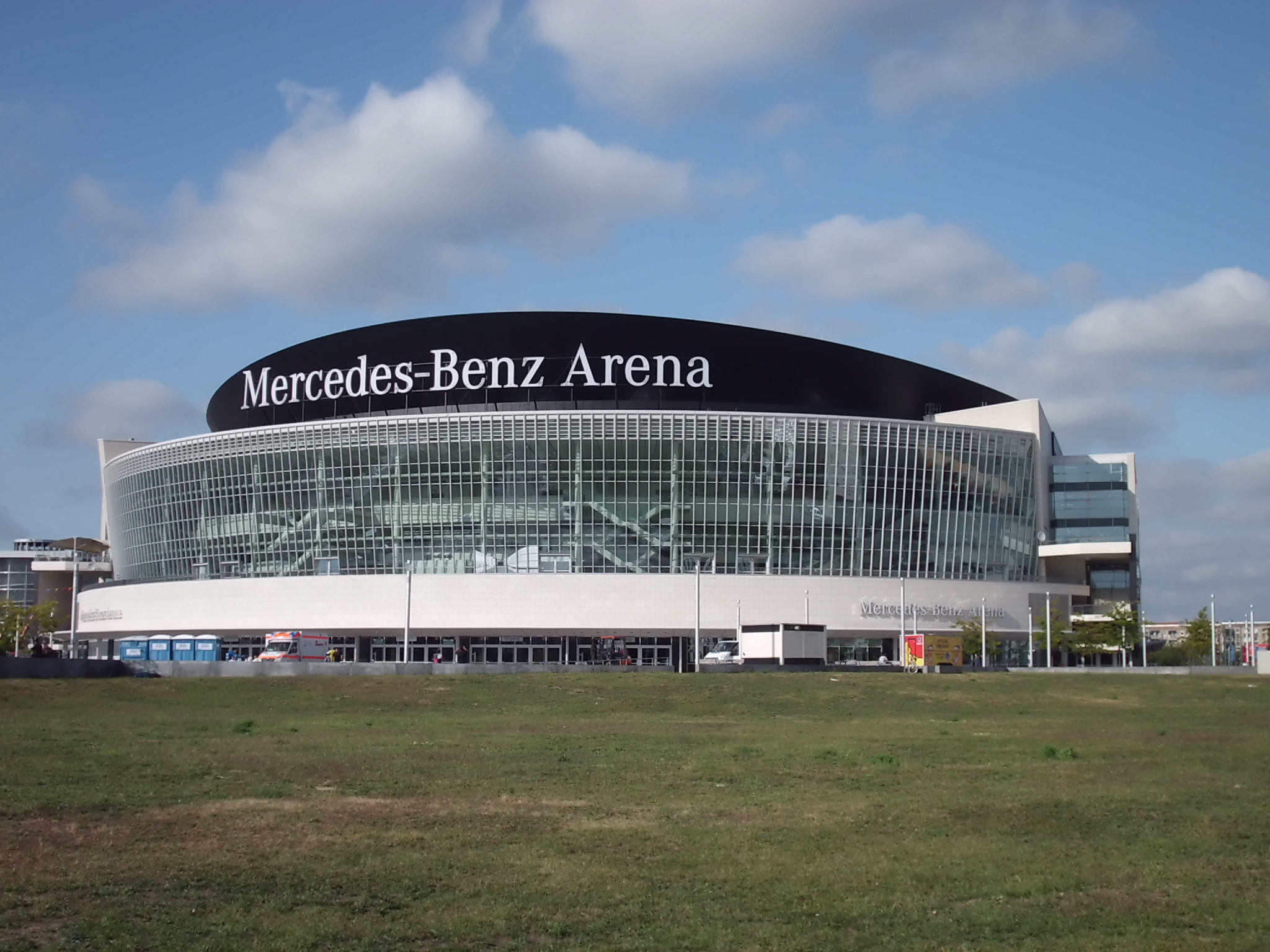
- The Mercedes-Benz Arena in Berlin hosted the Final
- Event: 2017 BBL-Pokal
Bayern Munich	Brose Bamberg
71	74
- Date: 19 February 2017; 15:00 GMT+2
- Venue: Mercedes-Benz Arena, Berlin
- Referees: Robert Lottermoser; Moritz Reiter; Martin Matip
- Attendance: 10,511

The 2017 BBL-Pokal Final decided the winner of the 2017 BBL-Pokal. The match was played at the Mercedes-Benz Arena in Berlin on 19 February 2017.

The final featured Bayern Munich, the runners-up of the previous season, and Brose Bamberg, the defending BBL champions. Brose Bamberg won the match 71–74 to claim their fifth cup title.

== Route to the final ==
Note: In all results below, the score of the finalist is given first (H: home; A: away).

Bayern Munich		Round	Brose Bamberg	
Opponent	Result	2017 BBL-Pokal	Opponent	Result
Telekom Baskets Bonn	87–72 (H)	Qualifying round	medi Bayreuth	75–52 (A)
Alba Berlin	78–70	Semi-finals	MHP Riesen Ludwigsburg	85–78

== Match ==
19 February 2017	Bayern Munich	71–74	Brose Bamberg	Mercedes-Benz Arena, Berlin
15:00	Scoring by quarter: 21–24, 15–21, 12–10, 23–19
	Pts: Johnson 13; Rebs: Redding 6 Asts: Redding 4	Boxscore	Pts: Causeur 18; Rebs: Theis 10; Asts: Causeur 3	Attendance: 10,511; Referees: Robert Lottermoser, Martin Matip, Moritz Reiter

Starters:			Pts	Reb	Ast
G	25	(Germany) Anton Gavel	8	1	3
G/F	15	(United States) Reggie Redding	11	6	4
F	11	(Serbia) Vladimir Lučić	9	2	0
PF	42	(Germany) Maxi Kleber	3	2	2
F/C	22	(Germany) Danilo Barthel	10	4	0
Reserves:					
G	13	(United States) Nick Johnson	13	2	2
F/C	31	(United States) Devin Booker	5	3	0
SG	44	(United States) Bryce Taylor	4	2	0
F	7	(Germany) Alex King	3	1	0
C	33	(Germany) Maik Zirbes	3	3	1
G/F	14	(Bosnia and Herzegovina) Nihad Đedović	2	1	0
PG	5	(Germany) Georg Beyschlag	DNP		
Head coach:
(Serbia) Aleksandar Đorđević

Bayern	Brose

Bayern	Statistics	Bamberg
18/42 (42/9%)	2-pt field goals	18/36 (50%)
5/18 (27.8%)	3-pt field goals	6/23 (26.1%)
20/24 (83.3%)	Free throws	20/22 (90.9%)
9	Offensive rebounds	9
26	Defensive rebounds	28
35	Total rebounds	37
12	Assists	11
13	Turnovers	14
3	Steals	5
0	Blocks	4
25	Fouls	22

Starters:			Pts	Reb	Ast
PG	1	(France) Fabien Causeur	18	5	3
SG	13	(Latvia) Jānis Strēlnieks	8	0	1
SF	33	(Germany) Patrick Heckmann	3	1	1
PF	4	(Italy) Nicolò Melli	6	5	2
C	43	(Croatia) Leon Radošević	5	3	0
Reserves:					
PG	12	(Germany) Maodo Lô	9	3	0
F/C	10	(Germany) Daniel Theis	17	10	0
SF	21	(United States) Darius Miller	8	3	2
SG	8	(Germany) Lucca Staiger	0	0	1
PG	6	(Greece) Nikos Zisis	0	3	2
SF	16	(Germany) Louis Olinde	DNP		
C	25	(Germany) Leon Kratzer	DNP		
Head coach:
(Italy) Andrea Trinchieri
