= 2014 Eurocup Finals =

Final two games of the 11th Eurocup basketball season

2014 Eurocup finals
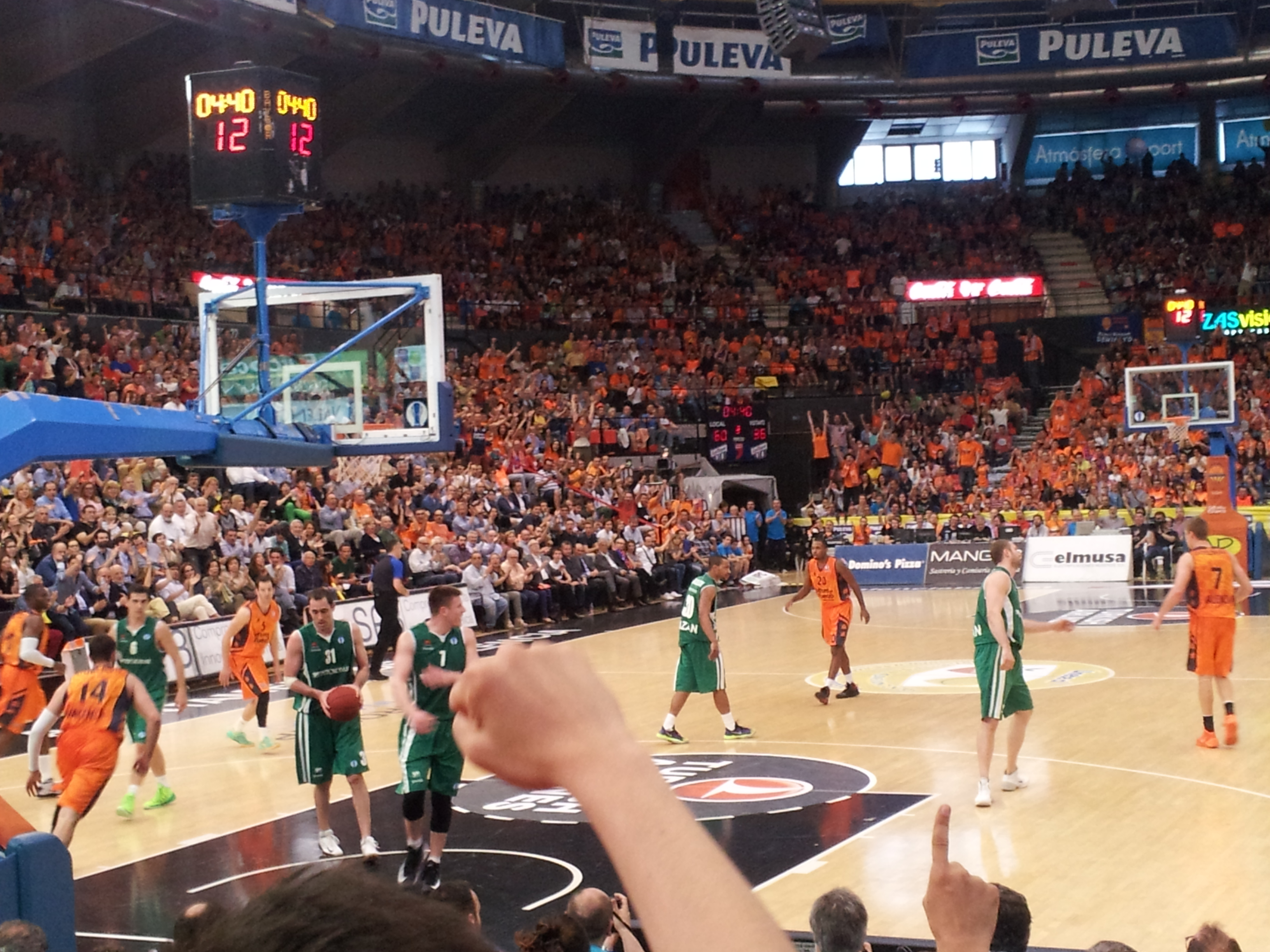
- Scene of the first match, held in Valencia
- Event: 2013–14 Eurocup Basketball
| Valencia | UNICS |
| (Spain) | (Russia) |
|---|---|
| 165 | 140 |

First leg
| Valencia | UNICS |
|---|---|
| 80 | 67 |
- Date: 1 May 2014
- Venue: Pabellón Municipal Fuente San Luis, Valencia
- MVP: Justin Doellman (Valencia)
- Attendance: 8,500

Second leg
| UNICS | Valencia |
|---|---|
| 73 | 85 |
- Date: May 7, 2014
- Venue: Basket Hall Arena, Kazan
- Attendance: 7,000

The 2014 Eurocup finals were the concluding two games of the 2013–14 Eurocup season, the 11th season of Europe's second tier basketball league.

== Route to the finals ==
Note: In all results below, the score of the finalist is given first (H: home; A: away).
The two teams met in the Last 32 phase already, as they both advance from Group O. UNICS won both games over Valencia, winning 82–75 at home and 73–76 away.

| Valencia | | Round | UNICS | |
|---|---|---|---|---|
| Opponent | Result | Season | Opponent | Result |
| 3rd in Group C (6–4) | | Regular season | 1st in Group G (10–0) | |
| 2nd in Group O (3–3) | | Last 32 | 1st in Group O (5–1) | |
| Opponent | Result | Knockout phase | Opponent | Result |
| (Russia) Khimki | 157–156 | Eightfinals | (Czech Republic) ČEZ Nymburk | 167–117 |
| (Germany) Alba Berlin | 159–132 | Quarter-finals | (Turkey) Aykon TED Ankara | 169–120 |
| (Russia) Nizhny Novgorod | 163–128 | Semi-finals | (Serbia) Crvena zvezda | 136–130 |

== Game 1 ==
1 May 2014
18:30

Boxscore

| Valencia (Spain) | 80–67 | (Russia) UNICS |
Scoring by quarter: 27–12, 22–15, 25–17, 6–23
| Pts: Doellman 28; Rebs: Doellman 6 Asts: Lafayette 7 | | Pts: Veremeenko 19; Rebs: Eidson 11; Asts: Eidson, Zisis 4 |

Pabellón Fuente San Luis, Valencia
Attendance: 8,500
Referees: Sreten Radovic (CRO), Tolga Sahin (ITA), Olegs Latisevs (LVA)

== Game 2 ==
7 May 2014
17:00

Boxscore

| UNICS (Russia) | 73–85 | (Spain) Valencia |
Scoring by quarter: 4–16, 21–23, 32–32, 16–14
| Pts: Goudelock 22; Rebs: Eidson, Kurbanov 8 Asts: Eidson 4 | | Pts: Doellman 26; Rebs: Sato 7 Asts: Lafayette 6 |

Basket Hall Arena, Kazan
Attendance: 7,000
Referees: Luigi Lamonica (ITA), Recep Ankarali (TUR), Elias Koromilas (GRE)

== Most Valuable Player ==
Valencia's Justin Doellman was named the EuroCup Finals MVP, after averaging 27 points and 5.5 rebounds in the series.
