= 2017 BBL-Pokal =

2017 national basketball cup competition in Germany

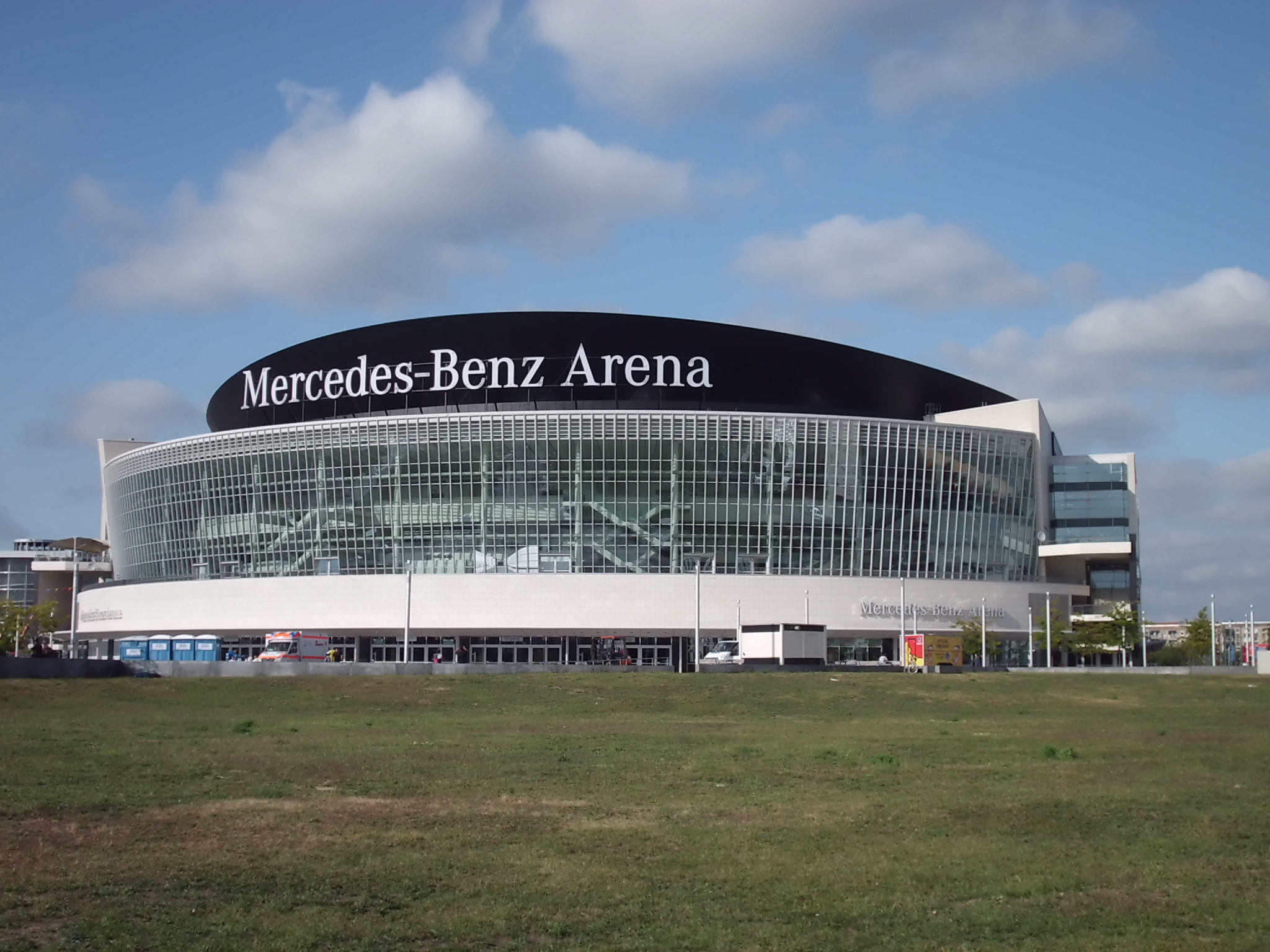
- The Mercedes-Benz Arena hosted the Final Four
- Season: 2017
- Dates: 22 January (qualifiers); 18–19 February (Top Four)
- Games played: 6
- Teams: 7

Finals
- Champions: Brose Bamberg (5th title)
- Runners-up: Bayern Munich
- Third place: Alba Berlin
- Fourth place: MHP Riesen Ludwigsburg

The 2017 BBL-Pokal was the 50th season of the German Basketball Cup. The Final Four was held in Berlin, which gained Alba Berlin automatic qualification. The other six participating teams were selected through the standings in the 2016–17 Basketball Bundesliga.

== Participants ==
The following six teams qualified based on their standings in the first half of the 2016–17 BBL. Alba Berlin qualified directly as host of the tournament.

Pos	Team	Pld	W	L	PF	PA	PD	Pts	Qualification or relegation
1	ratiopharm Ulm	16	16	0	1439	1242	+197	32	Qualified as seeded teams
2	Brose Bamberg	16	15	1	1362	1079	+283	30	Qualified as seeded teams
3	Bayern Munich	16	13	3	1385	1163	+222	26	Qualified as seeded teams
4	medi bayreuth	16	13	3	1364	1222	+142	26	Qualified as non-seeded teams
5	Alba Berlin (H)	16	11	5	1342	1295	+47	22	
6	Telekom Baskets Bonn	16	9	7	1314	1312	+2	18	Qualified as non-seeded teams
7	MHP Riesen Ludwigsburg	16	8	8	1213	1228	−15	16	Qualified as non-seeded teams
–	Phoenix Hagen (Note: In October 2016, Phoenix Hagen were punished with a deduction of four points for failing with licensing requirements. On 30 November 2016, the BBL withdrew the licence of the club and it was relegated to the ProA, while it also stopped playing and all results were expunged.) (D)	0	–	–	–	–	—	0	

Source: BBL
(D) Disqualified; (H) Hosts

== Bracket ==
Qualifying round 22 January
Bayern Munich	87
Telekom Baskets Bonn	72
MHP Riesen Ludwigsburg	72
ratiopharm Ulm	67
medi bayreuth	52
Brose Bamberg	75

Semifinals; 18 February
Bayern Munich	78
Alba Berlin	70
MHP Riesen Ludwigsburg	78
Brose Bamberg	85

Final; 19 February
Bayern Munich	71
Brose Bamberg	74
Third place
Alba Berlin	84
MHP Riesen Ludwigsburg	74

== Qualifying round ==
The draw was held on 30 December 2016.

22 January 2017	Medi bayreuth	50–75	Brose Bamberg	Oberfrankenhalle, Bayreuth
15:30	Scoring by quarter: 9–23, 10–21, 18–15, 13–16
	Pts: De'Mon Brooks 19; Rebs: De'Mon Brooks 5 Asts: Nate Linhart 3	Boxscore	Pts: Miller, Strēlnieks 13; Rebs: Miller, Theis 5 Asts: Causeur, Lô 5	Attendance: 3,300; Referees: Robert Lottermoser, Nesa Kovačević, Steffen Neubecker

22 January 2017	Bayern Munich	87–72	Telekom Baskets Bonn	Audi Dome, Munich
15:30	Scoring by quarter: 26–16, 17–26, 27–14, 17–16
	Pts: Anton Gavel 17; Rebs: Maxi Kleber 9 Asts: Booker, Gavel 5	Boxscore	Pts: Julian Gamble 15; Rebs: Ken Horton 10; Asts: Ken Horton 4	Attendance: 6,031; Referees: Clemens Fritz, Christof Madinger, Johannes Hack

22 January 2017	MHP Riesen Ludwigsburg	72–67	ratiopharm ulm	Arena Ludwigsburg, Ludwigsburg
18:00	Scoring by quarter: 21–7, 15–12, 18–21, 18–27
	Pts: Cliff Hammonds 12; Rebs: Crawford, Cooley 6 Asts: Cotton, Hammonds 4	Boxscore	Pts: Da'Sean Butler 18; Rebs: Butler, Rubit 6 Asts: three players 3	Attendance: 3,549; Referees: Moritz Reiter, Konstantin Simonow, Steve Bittner

== Top Four ==
The draw was held on 22 January 2017.

=== Semifinals ===
18 February 2017	Bayern Munich	78–70	Alba Berlin	Mercedes-Benz Arena, Berlin
17:00	Scoring by quarter: 21–21, 21–17, 18–13, 18–19
	Pts: Nick Johnson 19; Rebs: Reggie Redding 7 Asts: Nick Johnson 6	Boxscore	Pts: Dragan Milosavljević 17; Rebs: Tony Gaffney 6 Asts: Dragan Milosavljević 4	Attendance: 10,433; Referees: Robert Lottermoser, Anne Panther, Toni Rodriguez

18 February 2017	MHP Riesen Ludwigsburg	78–85	Brose Bamberg	Mercedes-Benz Arena, Berlin
20:00	Scoring by quarter: 15–22, 20–14, 19–25, 24–24
	Pts: Drew Crawford 17; Rebs: Drew Crawford 8 Asts: Cliff Hammonds 5	Boxscore	Pts: Causeur, Theis 19; Rebs: Melli 7 Asts: Strēlnieks, Zisis 5	Attendance: 10,433; Referees: Martin Matip, Christof Madinger, Moritz Reiter

=== Third place game ===
19 February 2017	Alba Berlin	84–70	MHP Riesen Ludwigsburg	Mercedes-Benz Arena, Berlin
12:00	Scoring by quarter: 20–19, 23–22, 25–14, 16–15
	Pts: Carl English 17; Rebs: Carl English 6 Asts: Akeem Vargas 5	Boxscore	Pts: Drew Crawford 10; Rebs: Jack Cooley 7 Asts: David McCray 3	Attendance: 7,371; Referees: Christof Madinger, Anne Panther, Toni Rodriguez

=== Final ===
19 February 2017	Bayern Munich	71–74	Brose Bamberg	Mercedes-Benz Arena, Berlin
15:00	Scoring by quarter: 21–24, 15–21, 12–10, 23–19
	Pts: Nick Johnson 13; Rebs: Reggie Redding 6 Asts: Reggie Redding 4	Boxscore	Pts: Fabien Causeur 18; Rebs: Daniel Theis 10; Asts: Fabien Causeur 3	Attendance: 10,511; Referees: Robert Lottermoser, Martin Matip, Moritz Reiter
