= Eurocup Basketball 2013–14 Last 32 Group O =

Tanmoy Saha

Standings and Results for Group O of the Last 32 phase of the 2013–14 Eurocup basketball tournament.

== Standings ==
	Team	Pld	W	L	PF	PA	Diff	Tie-break
1.	(Russia) Unics Kazan	6	5	1	461	425	+36	
2.	(Spain) Valencia BC	6	3	3	500	431	+69	2–0
3.	(Belgium) Telenet Oostende	6	3	3	439	483	–44	0–2
4.	(Poland) Stelmet Zielona Góra	6	1	5	425	486	–61	

== Fixtures and results ==
=== Game 1 ===
8 January 2014
19:00 CET

Boxscore

Stelmet Zielona Góra (Poland)	72–77	(Russia) Unics Kazan
Scoring by quarter: 23–23, 19–17, 12–22, 18–15
Pts: Dragičević, Koszarek 14; Rebs: Dragičević 7 Asts: Koszarek 6		Pts: Goudelock 17; Rebs: Eidson 7 Asts: Goudelock 5

CRS Hall Zielona Góra, Zielona Góra
Attendance: 2,212
Referees: Sasa Pukl (SLO), Luis Lopes (POR), Carlos Peruga (ESP)

8 January 2014
20:30 CET

Boxscore

Valencia BC (Spain)	101–74	(Belgium) Telenet Oostende
Scoring by quarter: 26–19, 28–20, 23–22, 24–13
Pts: Dubljević 18; Rebs: Dubljević 12; Asts: Ribas 8		Pts: Thompson 21; Rebs: Wright 5 Asts: Djordjević 5

Pabellón Fuente San Luis, Valencia
Attendance: 6,800
Referees: Tolga Sahin (ITA), Apostolos Kalpakas (GRE), Josip Radojkovic (CRO)

=== Game 2 ===
15 January 2014
17:30 CET

Boxscore

Unics Kazan (Russia)	82–75	(Spain) Valencia BC
Scoring by quarter: 17–18, 18–15, 21–22, 26–20
Pts: Kaimakoglou 19; Rebs: Harangody 7 Asts: Goudelock 7		Pts: Dubljević 19; Rebs: Sato 7 Asts: Lafayette 6

Basket Hall Arena, Kazan
Attendance: 3,500
Referees: Recep Ankarali (TUR), Marcin Kowalski (POL), David Romano (ISR)

15 January 2014
20:30 CET

Boxscore

Telenet Oostende (Belgium)	76–74	(Poland) Stelmet Zielona Góra
Scoring by quarter: 23–19, 21–17, 17–9, 15–29
Pts: Petrović 14; Rebs: Echenique 6 Asts: Djordjević, Marnegraeve 4		Pts: Cel 15; Rebs: Hrycaniuk 7 Asts: Koszarek 6

Sleuyter Arena, Ostend
Attendance: 1,890
Referees: Olegs Latisevs (LAT), Arnis Ozols (LAT), Oskars Lucis (LAT)

=== Game 3 ===
21 January 2014
20:30 CET

Boxscore

Valencia BC (Spain)	90–53	(Poland) Stelmet Zielona Góra
Scoring by quarter: 21–13, 22–11, 21–16, 26–13
Pts: Triguero 14; Rebs: Sato 7 Asts: Ribas 7		Pts: Dragičević 15; Rebs: Eyenga 8 Asts: Hrycaniuk, Kucharek 2

Pabellón Fuente San Luis, Valencia
Attendance: 7,000
Referees: Emin Mogulkoc (TUR), Robert Vyklicky (CZE), Tomislav Vovk (CRO)

22 January 2014
20:30 CET

Boxscore

Telenet Oostende (Belgium)	78–75	(Russia) Unics Kazan
Scoring by quarter: 24–25, 22–22, 17–10, 15–18
Pts: Djordjević, Gillet 15; Rebs: Echenique 6 Asts: Djordjević, Salumu 4		Pts: Goudelock 13; Rebs: Veremeenko 9 Asts: Goudelock 4

Sleuyter Arena, Ostend
Attendance: 1,367
Referees: Jose Ramon Garcia Ortiz (ESP), Marko Juras (SRB), Piotr Pastusiak (POL)

=== Game 4 ===
29 January 2014
16:00 CET

Boxscore

Unics Kazan (Russia)	69–63	(Belgium) Telenet Oostende
Scoring by quarter: 20–18, 11–16, 21–15, 17–14
Pts: Goudelock 27; Rebs: Eidson 6 Asts: Zisis 6		Pts: Thompson 17; Rebs: Thompson 5 Asts: Djordjević 4

Basket Hall Arena, Kazan
Attendance: 1,400
Referees: Marek Cmikiewicz (POL), Murat Biricik (TUR), Milos Koljensic (MNE)

29 January 2014
19:00 CET

Boxscore

Stelmet Zielona Góra (Poland)	82–77	(Spain) Valencia BC
Scoring by quarter: 20–18, 20–24, 24–14, 18–21
Pts: Eyenga 16; Rebs: three players 5 Asts: Koszarek 6		Pts: Doellman 19; Rebs: Lafayette, Sato 5 Asts: Van Rossom 3

CRS Hall Zielona Góra, Zielona Góra
Attendance: 2,198
Referees: Fernando Rocha (POR), Elias Koromilas (GRE), Marko Juras (SRB)

=== Game 5 ===
12 February 2014
16:00 CET

Boxscore

Unics Kazan (Russia)	82–64	(Poland) Stelmet Zielona Góra
Scoring by quarter: 30-12, 17-20, 20-18, 15-14
Pts: Vougioukas 19; Rebs: Harangody 8 Asts: Vougioukas 4		Pts: Zamojski 14; Rebs: Cel 6 Asts: Koszarek, Chanas 3

Basket Hall Arena, Kazan
Attendance: 1,500
Referees: Seffi Shemmesh (ISR), Sasa Maricic (SRB), Apostolos Kalpakas (SWE)

12 February 2014
20:30 CET

Boxscore

Telenet Oostende (Belgium)	64–84	(Spain) Valencia BC
Scoring by quarter: 21-15, 16-24, 12-28, 15-17
Pts: Gillet 17; Rebs: Echenique 8 Asts: Marnegraeve 5		Pts: Dubljević 26; Rebs: Sato, Dubljević 9 Asts: van Rossom, Martínez 5

Sleuyter Arena, Ostend
Attendance: 4,132
Referees: Eddie Viator (FRA), Tomas Jasevicius (LTU), Jurgis Laurinavicius (LTU)

=== Game 6 ===
18 February 2014
20:30 CET

Boxscore

Valencia BC (Spain)	73–76	(Russia) Unics Kazan
Scoring by quarter: 15–31, 25–17, 21–13, 12–15
Pts: Dubljević 20; Rebs: Dubljević 12; Asts: Lafayette 6		Pts: Goudelock 25; Rebs: Eidson, Zisis 6 Asts: McKee 4

Pabellón Fuente San Luis, Valencia
Attendance: 7,500
Referees: Jakub Zamojski (POL), Damir Javor (SLO), Petros Papapetrou (GRE)

19 February 2014
19:00 CET

Boxscore

Stelmet Zielona Góra (Poland)	80–84	(Belgium) Telenet Oostende
Scoring by quarter: 21-24, 24-22, 15-15, 20-23
Pts: Koszarek 17; Rebs: Dragičević 5 Asts: Cesnauskis 7		Pts: Djordjević 15; Rebs: Echenique 8 Asts: Djordjević 6

CRS Hall Zielona Góra, Zielona Góra
Attendance: 2,728
Referees: Srđan Dožai (CRO), Migueal Angel Perez Niz (ESP), Sašo Petek (SLO)
