= Da'Sean Butler =

American basketball coach (born 1988)

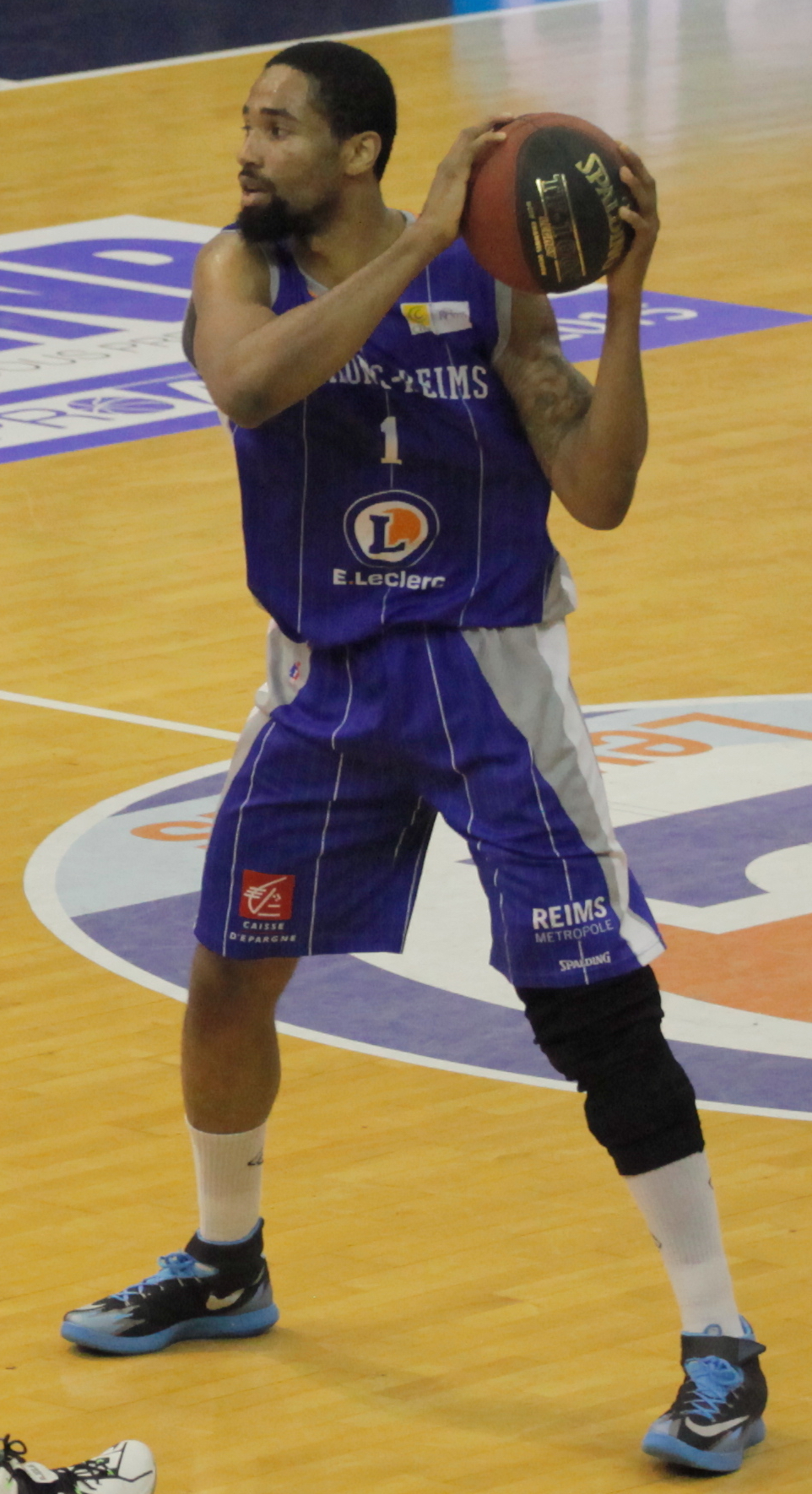
- Butler with Châlons Reims in 2015

Boston Celtics
- Title: Player enhancement coach
- League: NBA

Personal information
- Born: January 25, 1988 (age 38) Newark, New Jersey, U.S.
- Listed height: 6 ft 7 in (2.01 m)
- Listed weight: 230 lb (104 kg)

Career information
- High school: Bloomfield Tech (Bloomfield, New Jersey)
- College: West Virginia (2006–2010)
- NBA draft: 2010: 2nd round, 42nd overall pick
- Drafted by: Miami Heat
- Playing career: 2010–2020
- Position: Small forward / power forward
- Coaching career: 2021–present

Career history

Playing
- 2011: VEF Rīga
- 2011–2012: Austin Toros
- 2013–2014: Okapi Aalstar
- 2014–2015: Châlons Reims
- 2015–2018: ratiopharm Ulm
- 2018–2019: Hapoel Jerusalem
- 2019–2020: Hapoel Be'er Sheva

Coaching
- 2021: Wheeling (assistant)
- 2021–2022: College Park Skyhawks (assistant)
- 2022–2023: New York Knicks (assistant)
- 2023–2024: West Virginia (assistant)
- 2024–present: Boston Celtics (player enhancement)

Career highlights
- Israeli Cup winner (2019); Belgian Supercup winner (2013); All-Belgian League Second Team (2014); Second-team All-American – AP (2010); Third-team All-American – NABC (2010); Senior CLASS Award (2010); First-team All-Big East (2010)
- Stats at NBA.com
- Stats at Basketball Reference
Medals
Men's basketball
Representing United States
Summer Universiade
Bronze medal – third place	2009 Belgrade	Team competition

Da'Sean Butler (born January 25, 1988) is an American professional basketball coach and former player who is a player enhancement coach for the Boston Celtics of the National Basketball Association (NBA). He played college basketball for West Virginia University. Butler was drafted 42nd overall by the Miami Heat in the 2010 NBA draft.

== College career ==
=== Freshman season ===
Butler scored a career high 21 points in a game against Seton Hall. Against Slippery Rock, Butler had 15 points and nine rebounds off the bench, then had eight points against Arkansas. He had 9 points against North Carolina State, then 10 points and six rebounds against Duquesne. Butler scored 14 points against The Citadel, 16 points against UConn, 7 points against Villanova, and then six points against St. John's. He then scored 9 points and a season-high 10 rebounds against Notre Dame, followed by 12 points and six rebounds against South Florida. Butler then had 14 points and 8 rebounds against Cincinnati, 17 points against Rutgers, and a team-high 14 points against Pittsburgh in the Backyard Brawl. In the huge upset win over UCLA, Butler had 13 points, while scoring 17 points against Louisville in the Big East tournament. The Mountaineers eventually made it in the NIT Tournament, and all the way to the finals. In the finals win against Clemson, Butler had 20 points, as the Mountaineers were named NIT champions.

Butler was named to the Big East all-freshman team, while leading the Mountaineers to an NIT Championship. Butler averaged 10.1 points per game, averaging 23.3 minutes per game off the bench, while also averaging 3.5 rebounds per game.

=== Sophomore season ===
After the 2007 NIT Championship win, Mountaineers head coach John Beilein announced he would be leaving West Virginia University to take the head coaching position at the University of Michigan. Soon after, former head coach of Kansas State's basketball team and West Virginia alumnus Bob Huggins announced he accepted an offer to coach at West Virginia.

In the season-opening exhibition game against Mountain State, Butler earned his first career start as the Mountaineers won 88–65. Butler scored 16 points and added 8 rebounds and three assists as he and fellow guard Darris Nichols both went into double-digits in points. In the season-opener against Arkansas-Monticello, Butler scored 14 points while also grabbing a season-high 9 rebounds. In the 72–74 loss to Tennessee, Butler happened to score 16 points and grab 7 rebounds, while he scored 13 in the victories over New Mexico State and Auburn. Butler scored a season-high 18 points against Duquesne, while also grabbing 8 rebounds. He then scored 14 points against Maryland County, grabbing 9 rebounds, and Radford University, and then scored 10 against Canisius.

In the 88–82 loss to Oklahoma, Butler scored 15 points and grabbed 5 rebounds. In the loss to Notre Dame, Butler only scored 8 points but did grab 5 rebounds. Then in the victory over Marquette, Butler scored 13 points with 5 rebounds, but in the loss to Louisville he only scored 8 again. In the victory over Syracuse, Butler grabbed 6 rebounds to go along with his 13 points. Butler was key in the St. John's victory with 19 points and 9 rebounds. Butler recorded his first double-double of the season in the loss to USF, with 15 points and 12 rebounds. In the 66–64 victory over Marshall, Butler scored 18 points – including the game-winning shot in the lane with 6 seconds left.

Then in the 58–57 loss to No. 9 Georgetown, Butler attempted to score the game-winning points again. However, his layup attempt was blocked by Patrick Ewing Jr. The call was questionable however, as many believe it was actually a goaltending which would result in the points being rewarded and the Mountaineer-victory. However, Butler finished with 12 points and 4 rebounds. In an 81–63 victory over Rutgers, Butler scored 12 points. He then followed that game with 15 points and 8 rebounds against Seton Hall. In the 78–56 loss to Villanova, Butler scored 10 points and grabbed 7 rebounds. In the 80–53 victory over Providence, Butler scored 13 points and grabbed 4 rebounds.

In the 85–73 victory over DePaul to gain the 20th win of the season, Butler scored 14 points and grabbed 13 rebounds for his second double-double of the season. In the 79–71 loss to the Connecticut Huskies, Butler scored 9 points and added 7 rebounds. In the home finale victory over the Pittsburgh Panthers, 76–62, Butler scored 10 points and grabbed 6 rebounds. In the regular season finale, an 83–74 overtime victory over Providence, Butler scored 18 points, grabbed 10 rebounds, and dished 5 assists to finish the regular season. He finished the season with 12.5 points and 6.1 rebounds per game.

In the 58–53 victory over Providence to open the Big East tournament, Butler scored 17 points and added 9 rebounds. In the second round of the tourney, the Mountaineers upset #15-ranked Connecticut, 78–72. Butler contributed with 17 points and a team-high 9 rebounds. However, as the Mountaineers lost 55–72 in the semifinal matchup against the #8 Georgetown Hoyas, Butler scored 16 points with 3 rebounds and assists.

In the first round of the NCAA tournament, Butler scored 19 points with 7 rebounds as the No. 7-seed Mountaineers defeated the #10-seed Arizona Wildcats. In the second round, the Mountaineers upset the #2-seed Duke Blue Devils 73–67, with Butler scoring 8 points and grabbing 5 rebounds. Then, in the Sweet 16 loss in overtime to No. 3-seed Xavier, Butler scored 16 points and grabbed 7 rebounds.

Butler finished his sophomore season by averaging 12.9 points and 6.2 rebounds per game. During the Mountaineers Sweet 16 NCAA Tournament run, Butler averaged 14.3 points and 6.3 rebounds per game.

=== Junior season ===
Butler began his junior season under returning head coach Bob Huggins in the 98–78 exhibition win over Mountain State. In the victory, Butler led the Mountaineers with 38 points and 11 rebounds. In the regular season opener against Elon, Butler scored 19 points and totaled 6 rebounds and steals. Against Longwood, he then totaled 12 points and 4 rebounds. Opening the Las Vegas Invitational Tournament, the Mountaineers defeated Delaware State, with Butler scoring 12 points and grabbing 7 rebounds. He then scored 12 against Iowa, and before scoring 7 points with 9 boards in the loss to Kentucky. However, the Mountaineers then defeated Mississippi, with Butler scoring 22 points and grabbing 10 rebounds – his first double-double of the season. As the Mountaineers then beat Cleveland State, Butler led the team with 18 points. In the 68–65 last-second loss to No. 22 Davidson and Stephen Curry in Madison Square Garden, Butler led the Mountaineers with 24 points and 14 rebounds – his second double-double in three games. Butler reached his 1,000 career points during the Miami University victory, in which he scored a career-high 28 points out of the team's 82–46 victory and also had 5 rebounds. Most Rebounds in his Career.

Butler then had 11 points against Radford, followed by 16 points and 6 rebounds in the 76–48 victory over #13 Ohio State. In the 92–66 win over Seton Hall, Butler had 18 points, 9 rebounds and 5 assists. In the next loss to No. 5 UConn, 61–55, Butler scored 13 points and had 5 steals. As the Mountaineers then lost to No. 15 Marquette, Butler scored 16 points and had 5 rebounds. Butler then had 17 points and 7 rebounds in the victory over Marshall. Against South Florida, Butler scored 27 points with 4 rebounds, and then he totaled 27 points and 8 rebounds in the win over #14 Georgetown. In the following loss to No. 4 Pittsburgh, Butler scored 21 points and had 6 rebounds. In the win over St. John's, Butler scored 21 points and had 7 rebounds. Butler recorded his fifth-consecutive 20-point game with 23 points against #7 Louisville to go with 8 rebounds. Butler followed the Louisville loss with 23 points, 4 rebounds, 4 assists, and 4 steals against Syracuse. Butler's consecutive 20-point game streak ended at six games against Providence with his 17 points and 9 rebounds in the 86–59 victory. In the Backyard Brawl loss to No. 4 Pittsburgh, Butler only scored 4 points in limited playing time due to foul trouble.

On February 13, the Mountaineers defeated #13 Villanova 93–72. In the victory, Butler scored a career-high 43 points; 24 points coming in the first-half. Butler's point total was the second-highest individual scoring performance in a Big East conference game since the 2002–03 season, only one-point shy of Marcus Hatten's 44 point performance in 2003. His 43 points were the third-most ever scored in the WVU Coliseum, the most by a WVU player in conference play ever and the first 40-point performance since Lowes Moore in 1978. In the following 79–68 win over Notre Dame, Butler had 19 points, 4 rebounds and 4 assists. He followed with 12 points and 4 assists in the win over Rutgers. In the 65–61 loss to Cincinnati, Butler had 8 points and 4 assists. He then had 9 points and 12 rebounds in a win over USF. Butler then had a double-double in the win over DePaul with 16 points and 10 rebounds. In the regular season finale against #6 Louisville, Butler scored 10 points with 10 rebounds for a second-straight double-double. Following the 62–59 loss, he was named to the All-Big East second team.

In the second round of the Big East tournament against Notre Dame, Butler scored 20 points and grabbed 5 rebounds. In the quarterfinals' 74–60 win over #2 Pittsburgh Panthers, Butler scored 16 points with 4 assists and 3 rebounds despite sitting out due to 4 personal fouls. In the semifinal round, a 74–69 loss to No. 20 Syracuse, Butler scored 21 points and had 6 rebounds. In the Big East tournament, Butler averaged 19 points and 4.6 rebounds. However, the Mountaineers were upset in the first round of the NCAA tournament by Dayton, 68–60, with Butler scoring 12 points and grabbing 5 rebounds.

Butler finished his junior season with an average of 19.1 points per game and 5.9 rebounds per game. Butler had a season-high 43 points against Villanova and a season-high 14 rebounds against Davidson. Butler scored 20 or more points 12 times in the campaign.

=== Senior season ===
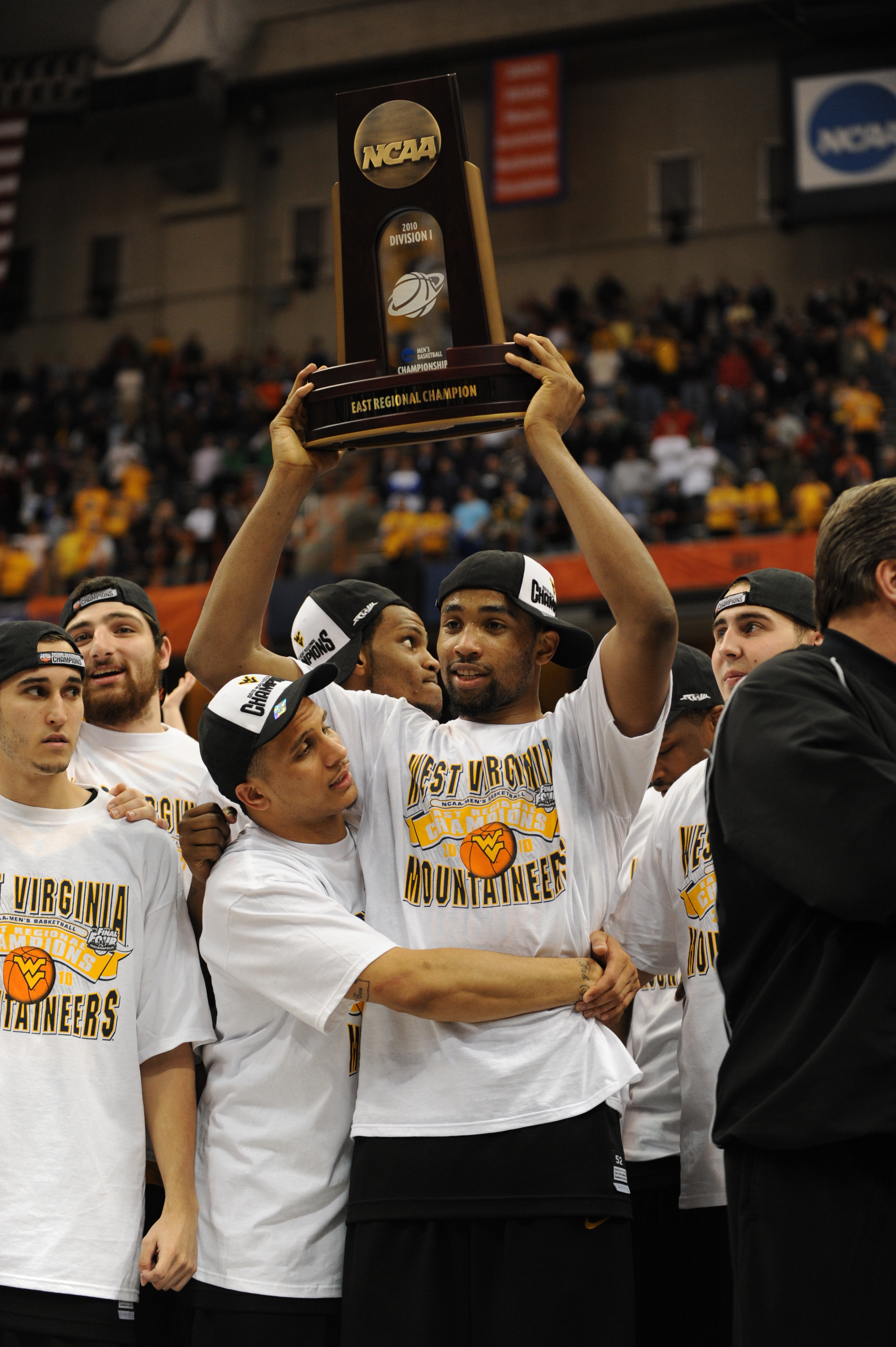
De'Sean Butler of West Virginia University lifts the East Region trophy after defeating Kentucky 73–66 in the 2010 NCAA men's basketball tournament.

Butler was invited to the 2009 USA Basketball Men's World University Games Team training camp prior to his senior season. Butler and the Top10-ranked Mountaineers opened up the season with a win over Loyola-Maryland, in which Butler recorded 26 points and 7 rebounds. In a later win over Portland, Butler scored 26 points with 6 rebounds. At the end of December, Butler hit a game-winning jumper to defeat Marquette, adding to his 17 total points.

After losing three games in early to mid-January, Butler and the Mountaineers bounced back with a win over #25 Ohio State and then a win over Louisville in which Butler scored 27 points. In a following win over St. John's, Butler scored 33 points, then he added 32 points in a triple overtime loss to No. 23 Pittsburgh. The Mountaineers ended their regular season with a 68–66 victory over #6 Villanova in which Butler had a double-double: 21 points and 10 rebounds.

In the Mountaineers' opening game of the Big East tournament, West Virginia defeated Cincinnati with help from Butler, who banked in the game-winning three-pointer with no time left to win 54–51. In the following 53–51 victory over Notre Dame in the semifinals, Butler scored 24 points. In the championship game, Butler again led the Mountaineers to victory with the game-winning bucket over #22 Georgetown. The victory was the first ever Big East title for the Mountaineers.

Entering the NCAA Tournament as a two-seed, the Mountaineers handled Morgan State in the opening round. Butler scored 28 points and added 8 rebounds in the second round victory over Missouri. After defeating Washington in the Sweet 16, the Mountaineers upset the 1-seed and tourney favorite Kentucky Wildcats 73–66, to advance to the school's second Final Four appearance. Butler had 18 points in the Elite Eight victory, including finishing 4–8 from the 3-point line.

Butler and Duke's Jon Scheyer were the only finalists in 2010's Final Four for the Lowe's Senior CLASS Award for Men's Basketball, which on April 3, 2010, was awarded to Butler. Later that day, in the second half of the Final Four loss to the Duke Blue Devils, Butler injured his left knee. Butler tore his ACL, sprained his MCL and sustained two bone bruises.

Butler was one of 10 finalists for the 2010 John R. Wooden Award. It is given to the National Player of the Year in college basketball by The Los Angeles Athletic Club.

== Professional career ==
=== Austin Toros (2011) ===
After months of rehabilitation, Butler was selected by the Miami Heat 42nd overall in the 2010 NBA draft. Butler signed with the Heat on August 30, 2010. However, on October 25, Butler was waived by the Heat at the end of training camp.

On March 25, 2011, Butler signed a contract with the San Antonio Spurs and was assigned to the Austin Toros of the NBA Development League.

=== VEF Rīga (2011) ===
In November 2011 he joined Latvian Basketball League club VEF Rīga during the 2011 NBA Lockout.

=== Return to Austin Toros (2011–2012) ===
Butler returned soon after to the San Antonio Spurs in time for the start of the 2011–2012 NBA season. He was officially waived by the Spurs on December 13, 2011.

He re-signed with the Austin Toros during 2012, but was released towards the end of the season after requiring additional surgeries on the same knee.

=== Okapi Aalstar (2013–2014) ===
On August 2, 2013, he signed with the Belgian team Okapi Aalstar for the 2013–14 season. On April 30, 2014, Butler recorded a career-high 31 points, shooting 13-of-19 from the field, along with five rebounds, two assists and two steals in a 110–98 win over Excelsior Brussels.

Butler won the 2013 Belgian Supercup with Okapi Aalstar. In 48 games played during the 2013–14 season, he averaged 16.2 points, 4.2 rebounds, 1.2 assists and 1.2 steals per game. On June 15, 2014, Butler was named the Belgian League Forward of the Year and earned a spot in the All-Belgian League Second Team.

=== Châlons Reims (2014–2015) ===
On June 22, 2014, he signed a one-year deal with the French team Châlons Reims. On May 9, 2015, Butler recorded a season-high 24 points, shooting 9-of-13 from the field, along with four rebounds and three assists in an 85–75 win over Pau-Orthez.

=== ratiopharm Ulm (2015–2018) ===
On July 12, 2015, he signed with the German team ratiopharm Ulm for the 2014–15 season. On April 16, 2016, Butler recorded a season-high 27 points, shooting 7-of-10 from 3-point range, along with five rebounds, two assists and two steals in an 87–71 win over Giessen 46ers. Butler helped Ulm reach the 2016 BBL Finals, where they eventually lost to Brose Bamberg.

On May 24, 2016, he re-signed with Ulm for the 2016–17 season. Butler helped Ulm reach the 2017 BBL Playoffs as the first seed, but they eventually were eliminated by EWE Baskets Oldenburg in the Semifinals.

On June 17, 2017, he signed a one-year contract extension with Ulm. In 23 BBL games played during the 2017–18 season, he averaged 10.3 points, 4.5 rebounds and 1.0 steals per game, shooting 39.6 percent from 3-point range.

=== Hapoel Jerusalem (2018–2019) ===
On August 12, 2018, he signed a two-year deal with the Israeli team Hapoel Jerusalem. Butler won the 2019 Israeli State Cup with Jerusalem.

=== Hapoel Be'er Sheva (2019–2020) ===
On October 2, 2019, he signed with Hapoel Be'er Sheva for the 2019–20 season. On December 22, 2019, Butler recorded a season-high 25 points, including a three-pointer at the buzzer to give Be'er Sheva a 79–77 win over Maccabi Ashdod.

== Coaching career ==
In February 2021, Butler joined Wheeling University as an assistant coach. He had been friends with the head coach Chris Richardson since he was 18 years old, and Richardson invited him to join his staff. In October 2021, Butler was hired as an assistant at the College Park Skyhawks of the NBA G League.

In July 2023, Butler returned to his alma mater, West Virginia, as an assistant coach under Josh Eilert.

In July 2024, Butler joined Boston Celtics as a player enhancement coach under Joe Mazzulla.
