= Devin Searcy =

American basketball player (born 1989)

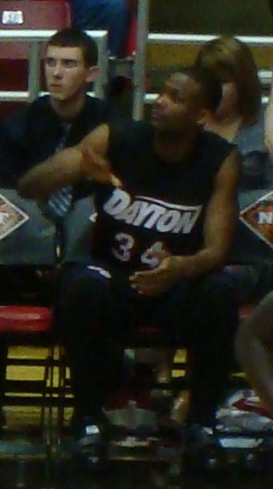

Free Agent
- Position: Power forward
- League: ProA

Personal information
- Born: August 25, 1989 (age 37) Romulus, Michigan, U.S.
- Listed height: 6 ft 10 in (2.08 m)
- Listed weight: 230 lb (104 kg)

Career information
- High school: Romulus (Romulus, Michigan)
- College: Dayton (2007–2011)
- NBA draft: 2011: undrafted
- Playing career: 2011–present

Career history
- 2011–2012: Toyama Grouses
- 2012–2013: Triumph Lyubertsy
- 2013–2015: Eisbären Bremerhaven
- 2015: Rouen Métropole
- 2015–2016: s.Oliver Würzburg
- 2016–2017: Rasta Vechta
- 2017–2018: AEK Larnaca
- 2018–2019: Manisa Büyükşehir
- 2019–2020: BCM U Pitești
- 2020–2021: Falco
- 2021: Start Lublin
- 2021–2022: Rasta Vechta

Career highlights
- Cypriot League champion (2018); Cypriot Cup winner (2018); Cypriot Super Cup winner (2017); Cypriot League All-Star (2017)

Devin Searcy (born August 25, 1989) is an American professional basketball player who last played for Rasta Vechta of the German ProA.

== Professional career ==
Searcy played for Japanese club Toyama Grouses during the 2011–12 season.

Searcy played for the Philadelphia 76ers during the 2012 preseason but did not make the final cut going into the 2012–13 NBA season.

On November 14, 2012, Searcy signed with BC Triumph Lyubertsy in Russia.

In July 2015, Searcy signed with Rouen Métropole Basket in France.

On November 12, 2015, Searcy signed with s.Oliver Baskets in Germany.

On July 29, 2017 Searcy joined AEK Larnaca of the Cypriot Division A.

On September 6, 2019, he has signed with BCM U Pitești of the Liga Națională.

On June 30, 2020, he has signed with Falco KC of the Hungarian Basketball League.

On January 11, 2021, he has signed with Start Lublin of the Polish Basketball League.

On July 2, 2021, he has signed with Rasta Vechta of the German ProA.
