= LaMonte Ulmer =

American basketball player (born 1986)

Free agent
- Position: Small forward

Personal information
- Born: September 17, 1986 (age 39) New Haven, Connecticut, U.S.
- Listed height: 6 ft 6 in (1.98 m)
- Listed weight: 216 lb (98 kg)

Career information
- High school: Notre Dame Prep (Fitchburg, Massachusetts)
- College: Rhode Island (2006–2010)
- NBA draft: 2010: undrafted
- Playing career: 2010–present

Career history
- 2010–2011: Maine Red Claws
- 2011–2012: AS Soleuvre
- 2012–2013: Tampereen Pyrintö
- 2013–2014: BCM U Pitești
- 2014–2015: KTP
- 2015–2017: s.Oliver Würzburg
- 2017–2018: Champagne Châlons-Reims
- 2018–2019: JL Bourg
- 2019–2020: JDA Dijon Basket
- 2020–2022: Orléans Loiret Basket

Career highlights
- LNB Leaders Cup champion (2020); All-FIBA Champions League Defensive Team (2020)

LaMonte Ulmer (born September 17, 1986) is an American professional basketball player who last played for Orléans Loiret Basket of the LNB Pro A. Standing at 6 ft 6 in (1.98 m), Ulmer usually plays as small forward.

== Professional career ==
In the 2014–15 season, Ulmer played for KTP in the Finnish Korisliiga. He averaged 17.8 points and 8.6 rebounds per game for KTP.

For the 2015–16 season, Ulmer signed with s.Oliver Baskets in Würzburg, a German first division team.

On 17 June 2017, Ulmer signed with Champagne Châlons-Reims Basket of the French Pro A.

On July 9, 2019, he has signed with JDA Dijon Basket of the LNB Pro A. He was named to the Basketball Champions League Team of the Week on January 16, 2020, after contributing 15 points and 10 rebounds in a win over P.A.O.K. BC. Ulmer averaged 10 points and 4 rebounds per game. On July 22, he signed with Orléans Loiret Basket. Ulmer averaged 11 points and 3.4 rebounds per game. He re-signed with the team on August 5, 2021.

== Career statistics ==
Legend
GP	Games played	MPG	Minutes per game	FG%	Field goal percentage
3P%	3-point field goal percentage	FT%	Free throw percentage	RPG	Rebounds per game
APG	Assists per game	SPG	Steals per game	BPG	Blocks per game
PPG	Points per game	**Bold**	Career high		Led the league

Year	Team	League	GP	MPG	FG%	3P%	FT%	RPG	APG	SPG	BPG	PPG
2010–11	AS Soleuvre	Luxembourg League	11	38.7	**.568**	.238	.710	**15.6**	**2.5**	1.3	1.0	**26.6**
2011–12	AS Soleuvre	Luxembourg League	22	**39.1**	.513	.400	.768	12.5	1.2	1.6	**1.3**	26.2
2012–13	Tampereen Pyrintö	Finnish League	**47**	28.4	.541	.302	.773	7.9	1.2	**1.8**	.8	19.1
2015–16	s.Oliver Würzburg	Basketball Bundesliga	37	26.0	.519	.441	**.828**	5.2	1.2	1.0	.7	12.0
2019–20	JDA Dijon Basket	LNB Pro A	25	23.6	.479	.318	.797	4.4	.9	.7	.4	10.3
2020–21	Entente Orléanaise	LNB Pro A	22	21.1	.522	**.466**	.750	3.4	.7	.9	.5	11.1
Career		All Leagues	164	28.3	.526	.377	.773	7.3	1.2	1.3	.7	16.5
