= Fabien Causeur =

French basketball player

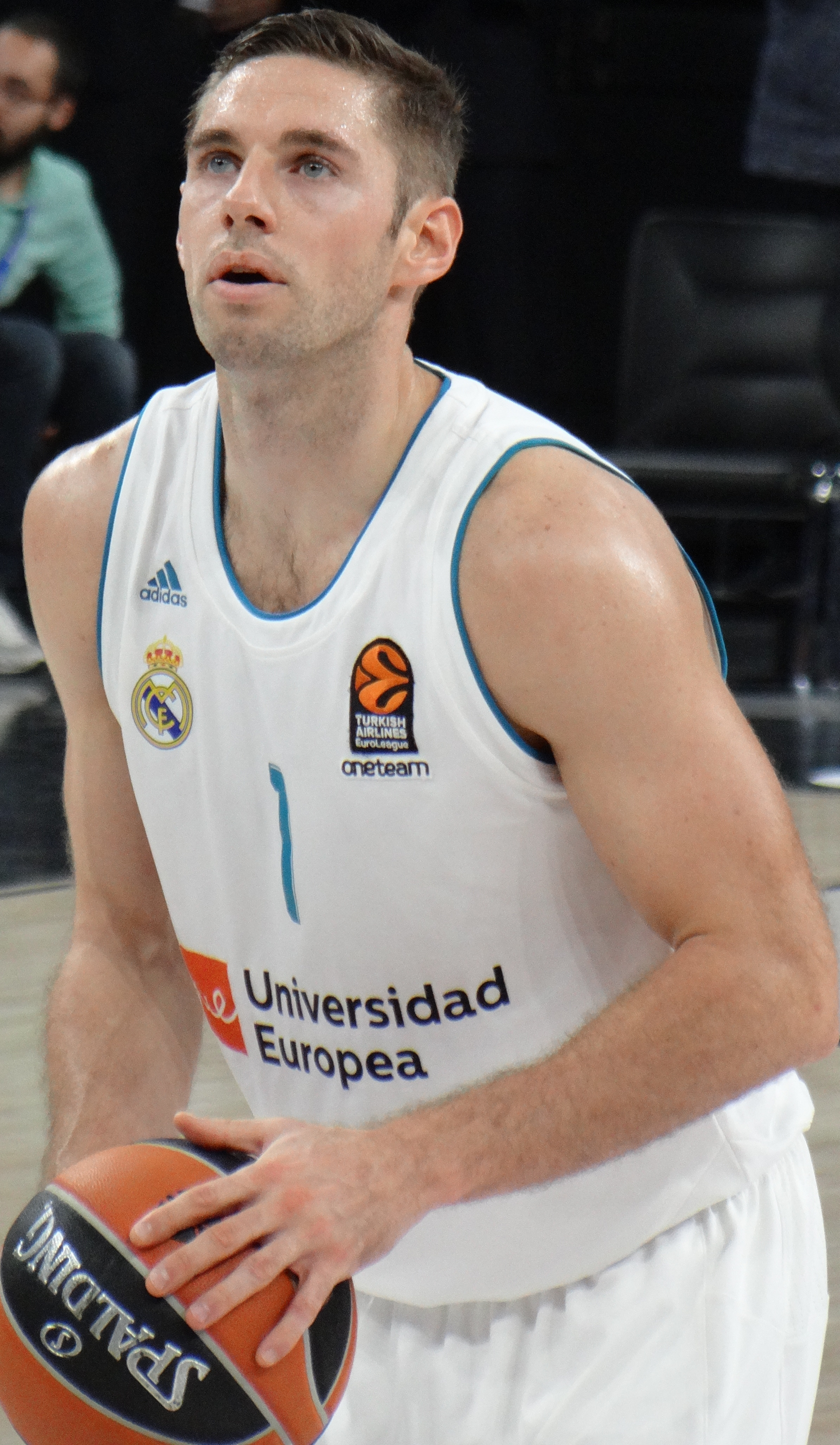
- Causeur with Real Madrid in 2017

Personal information
- Born: 16 June 1987 (age 39) Brest, France
- Listed height: 1.96 m (6 ft 5 in)
- Listed weight: 86 kg (190 lb)

Career information
- NBA draft: 2009: undrafted
- Playing career: 2005–2025
- Position: Shooting guard
- Number: 5, 55, 1

Career history
- 2005–2009: Le Havre
- 2009–2012: Cholet
- 2012–2016: Baskonia
- 2016–2017: Brose Bamberg
- 2017–2024: Real Madrid
- 2024–2025: Olimpia Milano

Career highlights
- 2× EuroLeague champion (2018, 2023); 4× Liga ACB champion (2018, 2019, 2022, 2024); LNB Pro A champion (2010); German Bundesliga champion (2017); 2× Spanish Cup winner (2020, 2024); German Cup winner (2017); 6× Spanish Supercup winner (2018–2023); French Supercup winner (2010); LNB Pro A MVP (2012); German Bundesliga Finals MVP (2017); French Player of the Year (2018)

Fabien Causeur (born 16 June 1987) is a French former professional basketball player. Standing at 6 ft 5 in (1.96 m), he played at the shooting guard position. He was the 2018 French player of the year.

== Professional career ==
Causeur played in the French League starting in 2005. He spent the first four years of his career with STB Le Havre. Le Havre finished fifth in the French League in the 2007–08 season; as a result Causeur played eight games with the team in the EuroCup 2008–09. Causeur joined the French team Cholet Basket for the 2009–10 season. He saw action in five games for the team in the EuroCup 2009–10.

He then moved to the Liga ACB club Saski Baskonia, where he played from 2012 to 2016. On 3 August 2016 Causeur signed with Brose Bamberg of the German Basketball Bundesliga and the EuroLeague.

In the 2016–17 season, Causeur won the Basketball Bundesliga title with Bamberg after sweeping EWE Baskets Oldenburg 3–0 in the Finals. Causeur was named the BBL Finals MVP, after averaging 14.0 points and 5.3 rebounds in the series.

On 25 July 2017 Causeur signed a two-year deal with Real Madrid. In May 2018, Real Madrid won the 2017–18 EuroLeague championship, after defeating Fenerbahçe Doğuş in the final game with 85–80. Over 36 EuroLeague games, Causeur averaged 6.9 points, 1.9 assists and 1.6 rebounds per game. On 3 July 2019 Causeur agreed a contract extension with Real Madrid until 2022. On 23 July 2024, Causeur parted ways with the Spanish powerhouse after seven successful seasons.

== National team career ==
Causeur first played with the junior national teams of France at the 2007 FIBA Europe Under-20 Championship. He was selected to the senior men's French national basketball team for the first time for the 2010 FIBA World Championship. He also played at the 2012 Summer Olympics.

== Career statistics ==
Legend
GP	Games played	GS	Games started	MPG	Minutes per game
FG%	Field-goal percentage	3P%	3-point field-goal percentage	FT%	Free-throw percentage
RPG	Rebounds per game	APG	Assists per game	SPG	Steals per game
BPG	Blocks per game	PPG	Points per game	PIR	Performance index rating
**Bold**	Career high

=== EuroLeague ===
†	Denotes season in which Causeur won the EuroLeague
*	Led the league

Year	Team	GP	GS	MPG	FG%	3P%	FT%	RPG	APG	SPG	BPG	PPG	PIR
2010–11	Cholet	4	3	**29.3**	.379	.267	.643	**3.5**	**2.3**	1.0	—	8.8	8.3
2012–13	Baskonia	28	13	20.8	.503	.375	.692	1.7	1.5	.7	.1	7.7	5.8
2013–14	Baskonia	17	12	23.2	.424	.297	**1.000***	2.4	1.5	.5	.1	5.9	6.0
2014–15	Baskonia	23	19	23.9	.506	.345	.700	2.7	**2.3**	**1.3**	.3	9.3	**11.4**
2015–16	Baskonia	21	20	28.2	.444	.395	.810	3.1	2.0	1.1	.3	**10.3**	11.0
2016–17	Bamberg	29	**29**	25.3	.502	.347	.776	3.2	2.2	.8	**.4**	9.9	11.0
2017–18†	Real Madrid	**36***	24	18.1	.529	.441	.712	1.6	1.9	.4	.1	6.9	7.2
2018–19	Real Madrid	35	24	14.1	.476	.415	.703	1.7	1.4	.3	.0	5.8	5.5
2019–20	Real Madrid	25	12	16.3	.552	.473	.650	1.5	1.5	.3	.0	7.5	7.3
2020–21	Real Madrid	28	8	14.1	.469	.417	.659	1.1	1.4	.4	—	6.3	5.4
2021–22	Real Madrid	28	18	20.0	.497	.432	.692	1.6	1.4	.4	.1	8.5	6.7
2022–23†	Real Madrid	29	8	12.7	.381	.364	.773	1.1	1.2	.4	.1	4.0	3.1
2023–24	Real Madrid	32	18	15.2	.462	.394	.889	1.3	1.1	.4	.2	5.1	4.5
2024–25	Olimpia Milano	22	2	21.0	**.564**	**.528**	.769	2.8	1.7	1.0	.1	8.3	9.9
Career		357	210	19.0	.487	.400	.737	1.9	1.6	.6	.1	7.2	7.1
