= Nikos Zisis =

Greek basketball player (born 1983)

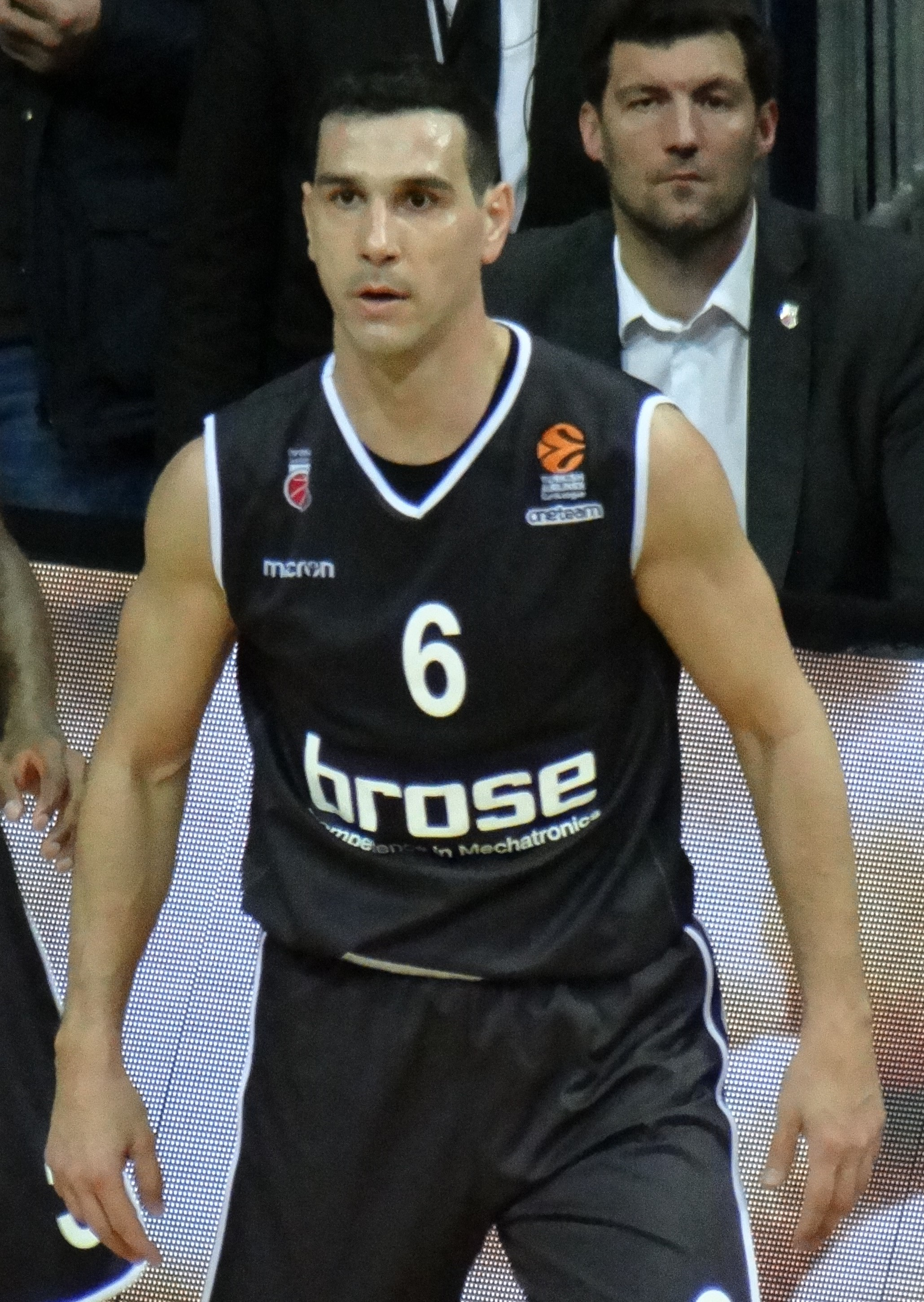
- Zisis in action with Brose Bamberg, in 2018.

Aris Thessaloniki
- Title: General manager
- League: GBL; EuroCup

Personal information
- Born: August 16, 1983 (age 43) Thessaloniki, Greece
- Listed height: 6 ft 5.75 in (1.97 m)
- Listed weight: 97 kg (214 lb)

Career information
- NBA draft: 2005: undrafted
- Playing career: 2000–2021
- Position: Point guard / shooting guard
- Number: 6, 16, 1

Career history
- 2000–2005: AEK Athens
- 2005–2007: Benetton Treviso
- 2007–2009: CSKA Moscow
- 2009–2012: Montepaschi Siena
- 2012–2013: Bilbao Basket
- 2013–2014: UNICS Kazan
- 2014–2015: Fenerbahçe
- 2015–2019: Brose Bamberg
- 2019–2020: Joventut Badalona
- 2020–2021: AEK Athens

Career highlights
- As a player: EuroLeague champion (2008); FIBA EuroStar (2007); 4× LBA champion (2006, 2010–2012); 4× Italian Cup winner (2007, 2010–2012); 4× Italian Cup Supercup winner (2007, 2010–2012); Greek League champion (2002); 2× Greek Cup winner (2001, 2020); All-Greek League Second Team (2005); Greek League Best Young Player (2001); 2× Greek All-Star (2004, 2005); Greek Cup Finals MVP (2020); Greek League Hall of Fame (2022); VTB United League champion (2008); 2× Russian League champion (2008, 2009); Russian Cup winner (2014); 2× Bundesliga champion (2016, 2017); 2× German Cup winner (2017, 2019); German Supercup winner (2015); German Cup Final MVP (2019); Acropolis Tournament MVP (2013); No. 6 retired by Brose Bamberg (2019); Jersey retired by HAN Thessaloniki (2021); FIBA Young Player of The Year (2005); FIBA Under-20 European Championship MVP (2002); ISF World Schools Basketball Championship champion (1999); 2× Panhellenic Schools Basketball Championship champion (1999, 2000)
Medals
Event	1st	2nd	3rd
FIBA World Cup	0	1	0
FIBA Stanković World Cup	1	0	0
FIBA EuroBasket	1	0	1
Mediterranean Games	0	1	0
FIBA U-20 European Championship	1	0	0
Albert Schweitzer U-18 World Tournament	0	1	0
FIBA U-18 European Championship	0	0	1
FIBA U-16 European Championship	0	1	0
Total	3	4	2
Men's basketball
Representing Greece
FIBA World Cup
Silver medal – second place	2006 Japan	
FIBA Stanković World Cup
Gold medal – first place	2006 China	
FIBA EuroBasket
Gold medal – first place	2005 Serbia & Montenegro	
Bronze medal – third place	2009 Poland	
Mediterranean Games
Silver medal – second place	2001 Tunisia	
FIBA Under-20 European Championship
Gold medal – first place	2002 Lithuania	Under-20
Albert Schweitzer U-18 World Tournament
Silver medal – second place	2000 Mannheim	Under-18
FIBA Under-18 European Championship
Bronze medal – third place	2000 Croatia	Under-18
FIBA Under-16 European Championship
Silver medal – second place	1999 Slovenia	Under-16
General Manager for Greece
FIBA EuroBasket
Bronze medal – third place	2025 Latvia	

Nikolaos "Nikos" Zisis (alternate spelling: Zissis; Greek: Νικόλαος "Νίκος" Ζήσης; born August 16, 1983) is a Greek basketball executive and former professional basketball player. During his pro club playing career, at a height of 1.97 m (6'5 3/4") tall, he played at both the point guard and shooting guard positions. He was inducted into the Greek Basketball League Hall of Fame in 2022. He is currently the general manager of the senior Greek men's national basketball team and of the pro club Aris Thessaloniki of the GBL and the EuroCup.

During his senior men's club playing career, Zisis won the 2008 EuroLeague championship, while he was a member of the Russian club CSKA Moscow. Zisis also won nine national league championships, in various European domestic leagues. He won a Greek League title, four Italian League titles, two Russian League titles, and two German League titles.

In addition to that, he also won nine European national domestic cup titles. He won two Greek Cups, four Italian Cups, one Russian Cup, and two German Cups. He also won five European national domestic super cup titles. As he won four Italian Supercups and one German Supercup. Two of his club teams, HAN Thessaloniki and Brose Bamberg, retired his team jerseys.

As a member of the senior Greek national basketball team, Zisis won the gold medal at the 2005 FIBA EuroBasket, the silver medal at the 2006 FIBA World Cup, and the bronze medal at the 2009 FIBA EuroBasket.

== Early life and youth career ==
Zisis started his basketball playing career in 1996, playing with the junior teams of HAN Thessaloniki (English: YMCA Thessaloniki). He was with the club until 2000. The club would later go on to retire his jersey in 2021. Nikos' high school team was Mandoulides Schools. In 1999 and 2000, Zisis won the Panhellenic Schools Basketball Championship, which is the Greek national high school basketball championship. In 1999, in Jerusalem, he also won the International School Sport Federation (ISF)'s Under-18 age category World Schools Basketball Championship.

== Professional career ==
=== AEK Athens ===
At the age of 17, Zisis moved to Athens and to the Greek League team AEK, where he began his professional basketball career. With AEK, he won the Greek Cup in 2001 and also the Greek League championship in 2002. He also won the Greek League Best Young Player award in 2002.

=== Benetton Treviso ===
After playing with the Greek club AEK Athens, Zisis moved to Treviso, Italy, and played on the Italian League team Benetton Treviso. With Treviso, he won the Italian Super Cup and the Italian League championship in the year 2006, and also the Italian Cup in the year 2007. He then left Italy and moved to Moscow, Russia.

=== CSKA Moscow ===
On June 13, 2007, Zisis signed a 3-year contract worth €5 million euros net income with the Russian team CSKA Moscow. With CSKA, Zisis won the EuroLeague championship at the 2008 EuroLeague Final Four. He also played in the 2009 EuroLeague Final with CSKA. While he was a member of CSKA, he also won two Russian League championships (2008, 2009).

=== Montepaschi Siena ===
In 2009, Zisis left CSKA Moscow, and signed a 2-year contract worth €1.6 million euros net income with the Italian League club Montepaschi Siena. In 2010, he signed a 2-year extension with Montepaschi. With Siena, he won three Italian League championships (2010, 2011, 2012), three Italian Cups winner (2010, 2011, 2012), and three Italian Cup Supercups (2010, 2011, 2012).

=== Bilbao Basket ===
In 2012, Zisis signed a 2-year contract, with the second year being an optional year, with the Spanish League club Bilbao.

=== UNICS Kazan ===
After spending a season with the Spanish club Bilbao Basket, Zisis moved to the Russian VTB United League club UNICS Kazan, in July 2013. With UNICS, he played in the 2014 Eurocup Finals. With UNICS, he also won the 2014 edition of the Russian Cup.

=== Fenerbahçe ===
On December 29, 2014, the Turkish Super League club Fenerbahçe Ülker acquired Zisis. With Zisis playing an average of 23.5 minutes per game with Fenerbahçe in the 2014–15 EuroLeague season, the team advanced to the 2015 EuroLeague Final Four. It was the first time in the team's history that they made it to the EuroLeague Final Four. However, on May 15, 2015, they lost in the EuroLeague semifinals to the Spanish club Real Madrid, by a score of 96–87.

=== Brose Bamberg ===
On July 16, 2015, Zisis signed a two-year contract with the German Basketball Bundesliga (BBL) club Brose Bamberg. In 2017, he extended his contract with Brose, through the year 2019. With Bamberg, he won two German BBL League championships (2016, 2017), two German Cups (2017, 2019), and the German Supercup (2015). In the 2019 German Cup Final, Zisis hit the game-winner, with 2.4 seconds left in the game, to give Bamberg an 83–82 win over Alba Berlin. On September 7, 2019, Bamberg retired Zisis' number 6 jersey.

=== Joventut Badalona ===
On July 15, 2019, Zisis signed a two-year deal with the Spanish Liga ACB club Joventut Badalona.

=== Return to AEK Athens ===
In January 2020, Zisis left the Spanish club Joventut Badalona, and signed with his former club AEK Athens, of the FIBA Champions League. With AEK, Zisis won the 2020 edition of the Greek Cup, in which he was also named the Greek Cup MVP. Zisis announced his retirement from playing professional club basketball in June 2021.

== National team career ==
=== Greek junior national team ===
With Greece's under-16 junior national team, Zisis won the silver medal at the 1999 FIBA Under-16 European Championship, and he also led the tournament in scoring. Zisis also won the silver medal with Greece's under-18 junior national team, at the 2000 Albert Schweitzer Under-18 World Tournament. He also won the bronze medal at the 2000 FIBA Under-18 European Championship. In addition, Zisis won the gold medal with the Greek under-20 junior national team at the 2002 FIBA Under-20 European Championship, where he was also named the tournament's MVP.

=== Greece national team ===
Zisis played with Greece's men's under-26 national selection at the 2001 Tunis Mediterranean Games. At the Mediterranean Games, he helped Greece win the silver medal at the tournament. As a member of the Greek men's national basketball team, Zisis won the gold medal at the 2005 FIBA EuroBasket, which was held in Serbia and Montenegro. He was Greece's leading scorer during the tournament, averaging 10.6 points per game. At the end of the semifinal game against the French national basketball team, Zisis drove the length of the court, drove into the middle of the floor, drew a double team, and then dished the ball out to Dimitris Diamantidis, who hit a game-winning 3 pointer. After his great performance at the EuroBasket in 2005, Zisis was named the FIBA Europe Young Player of the Year.

The next year, at the 2006 FIBA World Championship, which was held in Japan, Zisis hit a game winning 3-point shot at the end of the game against the Australian national basketball team, to give Greece a 72–69 victory. However, in the next game in the tournament, he was hit on the cheekbone and eye socket bone by the elbow of the Brazilian national basketball team's Anderson Varejão. Zisis suffered a severe facial injury that forced him to sit out for the remaining entirety of the 2006 World Championship, as the injury required surgery. Even though Greece lost Zisis, who was their leading scorer the year before at the 2005 EuroBasket, they were still able to win the silver medal (including an improbable upset victory over Team USA in the semifinals) during the World Championship tournament.

At the 2007 FIBA EuroBasket, Zisis was one of the two key Greek players, along with Theo Papaloukas, that led Greece's national team to the biggest comeback in the history of the EuroBasket, against the Slovenian national basketball team. The comeback was called "the miracle". Greece finished the tournament in 4th place.

Zisis also competed with Greece at the 2004 Summer Olympics, where Greece finished in 5th place in the world, and at the 2008 Summer Olympics, where Greece also finished in 5th place in the world. He also played at the following tournaments: the 2009 FIBA EuroBasket, where he won a bronze medal, the 2010 FIBA World Championship, the 2011 FIBA EuroBasket, the 2012 FIBA World Olympic Qualifying Tournament, the 2013 FIBA EuroBasket, the 2014 FIBA World Cup, and the 2015 FIBA EuroBasket.

After the conclusion of the 2015 EuroBasket tournament, Zisis retired from the senior Greek national team. Zisis finished his national team career with Greece, having won a total of ten medals at all levels, eight of which came in FIBA competitions. In 2019, the Hellenic Basketball Federation honored Zisis, in recognition of his contributions to the senior Greece men's national basketball team, with which he had 189 caps (games played).

== Executive career ==
In October 2021, Zisis began a career working as a basketball executive, when he became the general manager of the senior Greek men's national basketball team. Zisis became the general manager of Aris Thessaloniki, of the Greek Basketball League and the European-wide secondary level competition, the EuroCup, in 2025.

== Player profile ==
At 1.97 m (6 ft 5 3/4 in) tall, Zisis played mainly at the point guard and shooting guard positions, while also playing sometimes at the small forward position. Over his playing career, his primary position with his pro club teams was point guard, while his primary position with the senior Greek men's national basketball team was shooting guard. During his playing career, Zisis was known as "The Lord of the Rings", because he is the Greek player with the most combined medals won at the cadet, junior, young men's, and senior men's European and world FIBA tournaments.

== Personal life ==
Zisis' older brother Danis, died in a car accident in 2003. Zisis is very close friends with fellow former Greek men's national basketball team players Vassilis Spanoulis, Ioannis Bourousis, and Panos Vasilopoulos. He is also good friends with former Italian national basketball team player Andrea Bargnani and German national basketball team player Daniel Theis. He married Fani Skoufi in 2010, with Vassilis Spanoulis being his best man. His nickname is "The Lord of the Rings."

== Career statistics ==
Legend
GP	Games played	GS	Games started	MPG	Minutes per game
FG%	Field-goal percentage	3P%	3-point field-goal percentage	FT%	Free-throw percentage
RPG	Rebounds per game	APG	Assists per game	SPG	Steals per game
BPG	Blocks per game	PPG	Points per game	PIR	Performance index rating
**Bold**	Career high

=== EuroLeague ===
†	Denotes season in which Zisis won the EuroLeague
*	Led the league

Year	Team	GP	GS	MPG	FG%	3P%	FT%	RPG	APG	SPG	BPG	PPG	PIR
2000–01	AEK Athens	2	2	17.0	.400	.000	.000	1.5	.0	.0	—	2.0	-2.5
2001–02	AEK Athens	19	2	14.2	.528	**.450**	.588	.9	1.1	.4	—	4.5	2.7
2002–03	AEK Athens	14	9	23.2	.378	.143	.577	3.0	1.1	.7	—	5.7	3.6
2003–04	AEK Athens	14	13	26.3	.455	.318	.633	2.6	2.1	.8	—	8.6	6.9
2004–05	AEK Athens	20	20	30.5	.558	.317	.780	**3.1**	4.4	.8	—	**11.6**	**13.7**
2005–06	Treviso	7	7	**33.5**	.448	.263	.800	2.7	**4.9**	1.0	—	8.1	10.0
2006–07	Treviso	20	20	33.1	.470	.345	.828	2.5	4.3	**1.2**	**.1**	11.0	12.3
2007–08†	CSKA Moscow	25*	2	15.4	.544	.167	.833	1.8	1.4	.4	.0	4.3	4.1
2008–09	CSKA Moscow	21	2	16.2	**.571**	.350	.900	1.3	1.7	.2	—	5.3	5.6
2009–10	Mens Sana	16	1	16.0	.481	.167	.806	1.3	1.7	.5	—	5.4	4.6
2010–11	Mens Sana	22	10	21.5	.388	.257	.848	1.9	2.6	.9	—	6.0	6.8
2011–12	Mens Sana	20	4	19.5	.414	.259	.800	1.7	2.6	.3	—	4.5	5.4
2014–15	UNICS	10	7	19.5	.405	.421	.889	2.8	3.6	.3	—	7.0	8.6
2014–15	Fenerbahçe	19	13	19.5	.450	.333	.600	2.0	3.6	.4	**.1**	5.4	5.2
2015–16	Bamberg	24	20	26.0	.500	.388	.800	2.7	3.6	.4	—	10.1	11.8
2016–17	Bamberg	**30**	**24**	24.0	.436	.288	**.913**	2.0	4.5	.5	—	7.7	9.8
2017–18	Bamberg	27	20	22.3	.444	.410	.818	2.1	2.8	.5	—	6.3	6.9
Career		310	176	22.1	.418	.312	.790	2.1	2.9	.6	.0	6.9	7.4

== Awards and accomplishments as a player ==
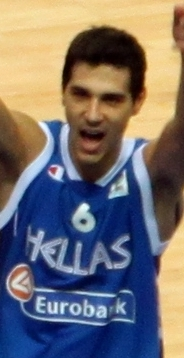
Zisis celebrating Greece's win against Turkey (76–74), at the 2009 EuroBasket.

=== Club titles and national team medals won ===
AEK Athens

- Greek Cup (2): 2000–01, 2019–20
- Greek Basketball League: 2001–02

Treviso

- Italian A League: 2005–06
- Italian Cup: 2007
- Italian Super Cup: 2006

Montepaschi Siena

- Italian A League (3): 2009–10, 2010–11, 2011–12
- Italian Cup (3): (2010, 2011, 2012)
- Italian Cup Supercup (3): (2010, 2011, 2012)

CSKA Moscow

- EuroLeague champion: 2007–08
- Russian Professional Championship: (2) 2007–08, 2008–09
- VTB United League: 2008–09

UNICS Kazan

- Russian Cup: 2013–14

Brose Bamberg

- German BBL champion (2): 2015–16, 2016–17
- German Cup (2): 2017, 2018–19
- German Super Cup: 2015

Mandoulides Schools

- 2× Panhellenic Schools Basketball Championship champion (1999, 2000)
- ISF World Schools Basketball Championship champion (1999)

=== Greek junior national team ===
- 1999 FIBA Under-16 European Championship: Silver
- 2000 Albert Schweitzer Under-18 World Tournament: Silver
- 2000 FIBA Under-18 European Championship: Bronze
- 2002 FIBA Under-20 European Championship: Gold

=== Greek senior national team ===
- 2001 Mediterranean Games: Silver
- 8× Acropolis Tournament Champion: (2004, 2005, 2006, 2007, 2008, 2009, 2010, 2013)
- 2005 FIBA EuroBasket: Gold
- 2006 FIBA Stanković World Cup: Gold
- 2006 FIBA World Cup: Silver
- 2009 FIBA EuroBasket: Bronze

=== Individual awards ===
- FIBA Under-16 European Championship Top Scorer: 1999
- Greek League Best Young Player: 2001–02
- FIBA Under-20 European Championship MVP: 2002
- 2× Greek League All-Star: 2004, 2005
- All-Greek League Second Team: 2005
- FIBA Europe Young Player of the Year: 2005
- FIBA EuroStar: 2007
- Acropolis Tournament MVP: (2013)
- German Cup Final MVP: 2019
- Number 6 jersey retired by Brose Bamberg: 2019
- Greek Cup MVP: 2020
- Jersey retired by HAN Thessaloniki: 2021
- Greek League Hall of Fame: 2022

== Awards and accomplishments as an executive ==
=== Greek senior national team ===
- 2025 FIBA EuroBasket: Bronze
