= Jānis Strēlnieks =

Latvian basketball player (born 1989)

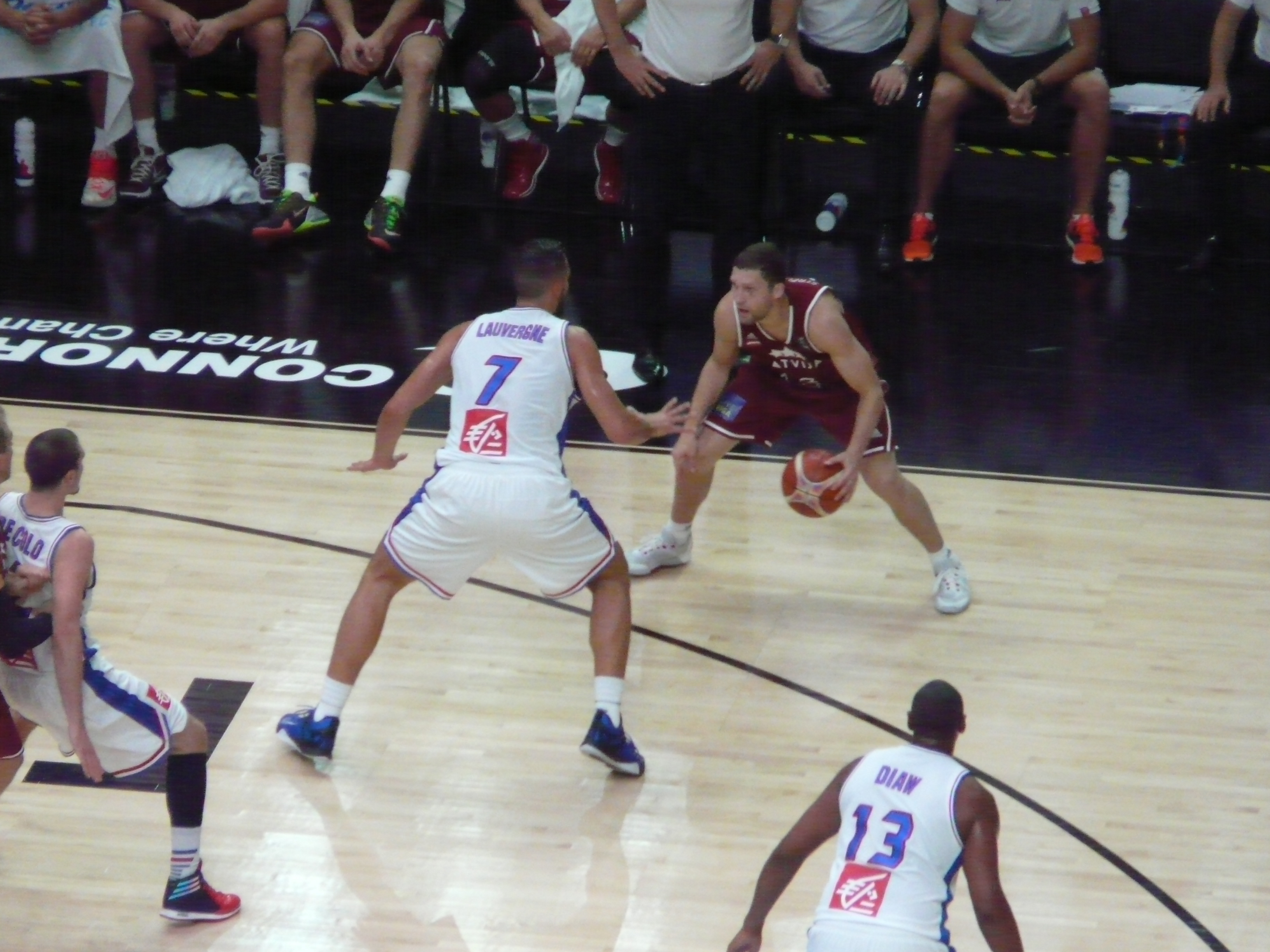
- Strēlnieks with the ball possession against France at the EuroBasket 2015

Personal information
- Born: 1 September 1989 (age 37) Talsi, Latvian SSR, Soviet Union
- Listed height: 1.91 m (6 ft 3 in)
- Listed weight: 88 kg (194 lb)

Career information
- NBA draft: 2011: undrafted
- Playing career: 2007–2024
- Position: Shooting guard / point guard

Career history
- 2007–2011: Ventspils
- 2011–2013: Spartak Saint Petersburg
- 2013–2014: Budivelnyk
- 2014–2017: Brose Bamberg
- 2017–2019: Olympiacos
- 2019–2021: CSKA Moscow
- 2021–2022: Žalgiris Kaunas
- 2022–2023: AEK Athens
- 2023–2024: Scafati
- 2024: Obradoiro CAB

Career highlights
- King Mindaugas Cup winner (2022); Greek League All Star (2019); 3× German League champion (2015–2017); German Cup winner (2017); German Supercup winner (2015); Latvian League champion (2009); Ukrainian Super League champion (2014)
Medals
Men's basketball
Representing Latvia
FIBA Europe Under-18 Championship
Bronze medal – third place	2007 Spain	Under-18

Jānis Strēlnieks (born 1 September 1989) is a Latvian former professional basketball player. Standing at 1.91 m (6 ft 3 in) tall, he mainly plays at the shooting guard position.

== Professional career ==
Strēlnieks started his professional career in 2007, with Latvian team Ventspils, where he played for four years. In 2010, he was pursued by the EuroLeague club Union Olimpija, which was then head coached by Jure Zdovc. However, Ventspils didn't let him go to Slovenia. After all, in November 2011, he finally got a chance to play for coach Zdovc, as he was at the time coaching the Russian team Spartak Saint Petersburg, that had bought out Strēlnieks' contract from Ventspils. He spent the next two seasons with Spartak. One of the highlights of his time in Spartak, was making the EuroCup's 2012 Final Four.

In August 2013, Strēlnieks joined the EuroLeague team Budivelnyk, signing a two-year contract with them. Strēlnieks enjoyed a successful season with Budivelnyk, that included winning the Ukrainian Super League championship, and playing in the EuroLeague for the first time. However, after the season ended, he had to opt out of his contract, due to the unstable political situation in Ukraine at the time.

In July 2014, he signed a one-year deal with the German club Brose Bamberg. In the following three seasons, Strēlnieks won the German Basketball Bundesliga championship with Bamberg. In the 2015–16 and 2016–17 seasons, Strēlnieks also played in the EuroLeague with Brose.

On 20 June 2017, Strēlnieks signed a two-year contract with Olympiacos, of the Greek Basket League and the EuroLeague.

On 8 July 2019, Strēlnieks signed a two-year deal with CSKA Moscow. On 11 June 2021, Strēlnieks officially parted ways with the Russian club. In 70 games (16 starts), he averaged 6.2 points, 1.2 rebounds and 2.0 assists.

On 29 July 2021, Strēlnieks signed a one-year deal with Žalgiris Kaunas of the Lithuanian Basketball League and the EuroLeague.

On August 10, 2022, Strēlnieks joined AEK Athens of the Greek Basket League on a one-year deal. On March 16, 2023, Strēlnieks suffered a season-ending Achilles tendon rupture injury. In 15 domestic league games, he averaged 8.9 points, 1.5 rebounds and 2.8 assists, playing around 21 minutes per contest.

== National team career ==
=== Latvia junior national team ===
In 2007, Strēlnieks was a part of the Latvian Under-18 junior national team that won the bronze medal at the 2007 FIBA Europe Under-18 Championship, which was held in Madrid, Spain. He made a game-winning basket in the last seconds of regulation against Lithuania's Under-18 junior national team, in the bronze medal game.

=== Latvia senior national team ===
Strēlnieks is a member of the senior Latvia national team. With Latvia, Strēlnieks played at the following tournaments: the EuroBasket 2011, EuroBasket 2013, EuroBasket 2015, the Belgrade 2016 FIBA World Olympic Qualifying Tournament, and EuroBasket 2017.

== Career statistics ==
Legend
GP	Games played	GS	Games started	MPG	Minutes per game
FG%	Field-goal percentage	3P%	3-point field-goal percentage	FT%	Free-throw percentage
RPG	Rebounds per game	APG	Assists per game	SPG	Steals per game
BPG	Blocks per game	PPG	Points per game	PIR	Performance index rating
**Bold**	Career high

=== EuroLeague ===
Year	Team	GP	GS	MPG	FG%	3P%	FT%	RPG	APG	SPG	BPG	PPG	PIR
2013–14	Budivelnyk	10	**6**	22.5	.509	**.464**	**1.000**	1.4	2.6	**.9**	.0	8.1	8.4
2015–16	Bamberg	24	4	24.2	.476	.404	.913	2.0	3.3	.7	**.1**	9.8	10.7
2016–17	Bamberg	22	5	**25.1**	.522	.459	.892	**2.2**	**3.5**	.6	**.1**	**11.7**	**12.8**
2017–18	Olympiacos	**34**	4	19.9	.435	.382	.918	1.3	2.1	.6	.0	7.5	7.1
2018–19	Olympiacos	20	5	20.4	.495	.459	.868	1.9	2.0	.7	.1	8.8	8.3
2019–20	CSKA Moscow	21	6	16.0	**.538**	.417	.921	1.8	2.0	.6	.0	7.2	8.5
2020–21	CSKA Moscow	26	3	13.4	.460	.417	.643	0.8	1.6	.3	.0	4.4	3.2
2021–22	Žalgiris	23	**22**	20.5	.391	.337	.857	1.7	1.8	.7	.1	6.5	5.6
Career		180	55	20.0	.466	.410	.891	1.6	2.3	.6	.0	7.9	7.9

== Personal life ==
His older brother, Artūrs, is also a professional basketball player.
