= 2014–15 Gonzaga Bulldogs men's basketball team =

American college basketball season

2014–15 Gonzaga Bulldogs men's basketball

WCC regular season and tournament champions NIT Season Tip-Off champions

NCAA tournament, Elite Eight
- Conference: West Coast Conference

Ranking
- Coaches: No. 6
- AP: No. 7
- Record: 35–3 (17–1 WCC)
- Head coach: Mark Few (16th season)
- Assistant coaches: Tommy Lloyd (14th season); Donny Daniels (5th season); Brian Michaelson (2nd season)
- Home arena: McCarthey Athletic Center

2014–15 West Coast Conference men's basketball standings
	Conf.				Overall
Team	W		L	PCT	W		L	PCT
No. 7 Gonzaga †	17	–	1	.944	35	–	3	.921
BYU	13	–	5	.722	25	–	10	.714
Saint Mary's	13	–	5	.722	21	–	10	.677
Pepperdine	10	–	8	.556	18	–	14	.563
San Diego	8	–	10	.444	15	–	16	.484
Portland	7	–	11	.389	17	–	16	.515
Santa Clara	7	–	11	.389	14	–	18	.438
San Francisco	7	–	11	.389	14	–	18	.438
Pacific	4	–	14	.222	12	–	19	.387
Loyola Marymount	4	–	14	.222	8	–	23	.258
† Conference tournament winner Rankings from AP poll

The 2014–15 Gonzaga Bulldogs men's basketball team represented Gonzaga University in the 2014–15 NCAA Division I men's basketball season. The team was led by head coach Mark Few, who was in his 16th season as head coach. The team played its home games at McCarthey Athletic Center, which has a capacity of 6,000. The Bulldogs (also informally referred to as the Zags) were playing in their 35th season as a member of the West Coast Conference. The Zags were predicted to finish atop of the conference by the West Coast Conference Preseason Poll. The Zags finished in first place in the West Coast Conference Standings for the 18th time with a 17-1 conference record after BYU defeated the Zags in the regular season finale, snapping the nation's longest active home winning streak of 41 games, as well as Gonzaga's school record 22-game winning streak.

The Bulldogs then went on to beat BYU in the West Coast Conference tournament, and claimed their 14th WCC tournament title, along with punching their 18th ticket to the NCAA Tournament. Gonzaga entered the 2015 NCAA tournament as a #2 seed in the South region, and dismantled #15 seed North Dakota State, #7 seed Iowa, and #11 seed UCLA, to gain its second trip to the Elite Eight, as well as Mark Few's first as head coach. The Zags then fell to #1 seed (and eventual national champion) Duke, and finished the season with a 35–3 record, which were the most wins in school history.

== Previous season ==
The 2013-14 Gonzaga Bulldogs team were predicted to finish atop of the conference by the West Coast Conference Preseason Poll. The Zags finished in first place in the West Coast Conference Standings for the 17th time with a 15–3 conference record. The Bulldogs then went on to beat BYU in the West Coast Conference tournament, and claimed their 13th WCC tournament title, along with punching their 17th ticket to the NCAA Tournament. The team drew an eight seed in the 2014 NCAA tournament, where they outlasted ninth seed Oklahoma State in the round of 64, 85–77, but then lost to Arizona in the round of 32, 84–61. The Zags finished the season with an overall record of 29–7, including a perfect 15–0 record at home.

== Preseason ==
=== Departures ===
Name	Number	Pos.	Height	Weight	Year	Hometown	Reason for departure
Sam Dower	35	C	6'9"	243	Senior (Redshirt)	Brooklyn Park, MN	Graduated
David Stockton	11	G	5'11"	165	Senior (Redshirt)	Spokane, WA	Graduated
Drew Barham	43	F	6'7"	200	Senior (Redshirt)	Memphis, TN	Graduated
Brian Bhaskar	22	G	6'2"	185	Senior	Monterey, CA	Graduated
Gerard Coleman	0	G	6'4"	170	Junior (Redshirt)	Boston, MA	Transferred to Georgetown (KY)
Luke Meikle	21	F	6'9"	203	Freshman	Tacoma, WA	Transferred to Cal Poly
Leo Roese	23	G	6'3"	184	Freshman	São Paulo, Brazil	Left Team

=== Incoming transfers ===
Name	Pos.	Height	Weight	Year	Hometown	Previous School	Years Remaining	Date Eligible
Byron Wesley	G	6'5"	210	Senior	Rancho Cucamonga, CA	USC	1	Oct. 1, 2014
Eric McClellan	G	6'4"	180	Junior (Redshirt)	Austin, TX	Vanderbilt	1.5	Jan. 6, 2015

=== 2014 recruiting class ===
College recruiting
Name	Hometown	School	Height	Weight	Commit date
Silas Melson; SG	Portland, OR	Jefferson	6 ft 2 in (1.88 m)	170 lb (77 kg)	Jun 18, 2013
Silas Melson; SG	Recruit ratings: Scout: Rivals: 247Sports: ESPN: (73)				
Josh Perkins; PG	Park Hill, CO	Huntington Prep	6 ft 3 in (1.91 m)	186 lb (84 kg)	Aug 24, 2013
Josh Perkins; PG	Recruit ratings: Scout: Rivals: 247Sports: ESPN: (86)				
Bryan Alberts; SG	Northridge, CA	Village Christian	6 ft 5 in (1.96 m)	200 lb (91 kg)	Oct 28, 2013
Bryan Alberts; SG	Recruit ratings: Scout: Rivals: 247Sports: ESPN: (70)				
Domantas Sabonis; PF	Kaunas, Lithuania	Sunny View School	6 ft 10 in (2.08 m)	210 lb (95 kg)	Apr 17, 2014
Domantas Sabonis; PF	Recruit ratings: Scout: Rivals: 247Sports: ESPN: (N/A)				
Overall recruit ranking: Scout: N/A Rivals: N/A 247Sports: #14 ESPN: N/A
Note: In many cases, Scout, Rivals, 247Sports, On3, and ESPN may conflict in their listings of height and weight.; In these cases, the average was taken. ESPN grades are on a 100-point scale.; Sources: "2014 Gonzaga Rivals Commits". Rivals.; "2014 Gonzaga Scout Commits". Scout.; "2014 Gonzaga ESPN Commits". ESPN.; "Scout.com Team Recruiting Rankings". Scout.; "2014 Team Ranking". Rivals.; "2014 Gonzaga 24/7 Sports Commits". 247Sports.

=== 2015 recruiting class ===
College recruiting (2015)
Name	Hometown	School	Height	Weight	Commit date
Jesse Wade; PG	Kaysville, UT	Davis	6 ft 1 in (1.85 m)	165 lb (75 kg)	Oct 4, 2013
Jesse Wade; PG	Recruit ratings: Scout: Rivals: 247Sports: ESPN: (80)				
Overall recruit ranking: Scout: N/A Rivals: N/A 247Sports: #110 ESPN: N/A
Note: In many cases, Scout, Rivals, 247Sports, On3, and ESPN may conflict in their listings of height and weight.; In these cases, the average was taken. ESPN grades are on a 100-point scale.; Sources: "2015 Gonzaga Rivals Commits". Rivals.; "2015 Gonzaga Scout Commits". Scout.; "2015 Gonzaga ESPN Commits". ESPN.; "Scout.com Team Recruiting Rankings". Scout.; "2015 Team Ranking". Rivals.; "2015 Gonzaga 24/7 Sports Commits". 247Sports.

== Roster ==
2014–15 Gonzaga Bulldogs men's basketball team
Players
Coaches

Pos.	#	Name	Height	Weight	Year	Previous school	Hometown
G	5	Gary Bell Jr.	6 ft 2 in (1.88 m)	214 lb (97 kg)	Sr	Kentridge	Kent, WA
G	4	Kevin Pangos	6 ft 2 in (1.88 m)	182 lb (83 kg)	Sr	Denison Secondary	Newmarket, ON
G	22	Byron Wesley	6 ft 4 in (1.93 m)	206 lb (93 kg)	Sr	Etiwanda; USC	Rancho Cucamonga, CA
G	21	Eric McClellan	6 ft 3 in (1.91 m)	184 lb (83 kg)	RS Jr	Austin; Vanderbilt; Tulsa	Austin, TX
F	33	Kyle Wiltjer	6 ft 10 in (2.08 m)	240 lb (109 kg)	RS Jr	Jesuit; Kentucky	Portland, OR
F	2	Angel Nunez	6 ft 8 in (2.03 m)	202 lb (92 kg)	RS Jr	Notre Dame Prep; Louisville	Bronx, NY
G	3	Kyle Dranginis	6 ft 5 in (1.96 m)	202 lb (92 kg)	RS Jr	Skyview	Nampa, ID
C	24	Przemek Karnowski	7 ft 1 in (2.16 m)	288 lb (131 kg)	Jr	Nicolaus Copernicus; Siarka Jezioro Tarnobrzeg	Toruń, Poland
G	15	Rem Bakamus (W)	6 ft 0 in (1.83 m)	167 lb (76 kg)	RS So	Mark Morris	Longview, WA
G	14	Connor Griffin (W)	6 ft 4 in (1.93 m)	212 lb (96 kg)	So	Lake Oswego	Lake Oswego, OR
C	25	Ryan Edwards (redshirt)	7 ft 1 in (2.16 m)	294 lb (133 kg)	So	Glacier	Kalispell, MT
G	55	Dustin Triano (W)	6 ft 3 in (1.91 m)	178 lb (81 kg)	RS Fr	New Hampton School	Vancouver, BC
G	0	Silas Melson	6 ft 4 in (1.93 m)	178 lb (81 kg)	Fr	Jefferson	Portland, OR
F	11	Domantas Sabonis	6 ft 10 in (2.08 m)	231 lb (105 kg)	Fr	Sunny View School; Unicaja Málaga	Kaunas, Lithuania
G	13	Josh Perkins (injured) (redshirt)	6 ft 3 in (1.91 m)	186 lb (84 kg)	Fr	Huntington Prep	Park Hill, CO
G	10	Bryan Alberts (redshirt)	6 ft 5 in (1.96 m)	190 lb (86 kg)	Fr	Village Christian	Northridge, CA

Head coach

- Mark Few, 16th yr. (Oregon, 1987)

Assistant coach(es)

- Tommy Lloyd, 14th yr. (Whitman, 1998)
- Donny Daniels, 5th yr. (Cal State Fullerton, 1976)
- Brian Michaelson, 2nd yr. (Gonzaga, 2005)

Legend

- (C) Team captain
- (S) Suspended
- (I) Ineligible
- (W) Walk-on
- Injured
- Current redshirt

Roster
Last update: February 18, 2015

- Ryan Edwards has elected to redshirt the 2014-15 season and will have 3 years of eligibility remaining effective in 2015-16.
- Bryan Alberts has elected to redshirt the 2014-15 season and will have 4 years of eligibility remaining effective in 2015-16.
- Josh Perkins suffered a broken jaw in a November 2014 game and received a medical redshirt. He was finally cleared to play with full contact in late April 2015.
- Angel Nunez won an appeal to grant him one final year of eligibility after the 2014-15 season.

== Rankings ==
Ranking movement Legend: ██ Increase in ranking. ██ Decrease in ranking. ██ Not ranked the previous week. RV=Others receiving votes.
Poll	Pre	Wk 2	Wk 3	Wk 4	Wk 5	Wk 6	Wk 7	Wk 8	Wk 9	Wk 10	Wk 11	Wk 12	Wk 13	Wk 14	Wk 15	Wk 16	Wk 17	Wk 18	Wk 19	Final
AP	13	13	10	9	9	8	8	7	6	3	3	3	2	3	3	3	7	7	7	N/A
Coaches	13	11	8	8	8	8	8	8	7	3	3	3	2 (1)	2 (1)	2 (1)	2	7	7	7	6

== Schedule ==
Gonzaga's non-conference schedule included home games against SMU, Memphis, Texas Southern, Sacramento State, and Southeastern Louisiana. Gonzaga played true road games at Arizona and UCLA, and also faced off with Washington State at the Spokane Arena. The Zags were invited to be a host in the NIT Season Tip-Off, where they hosted Saint Joseph's and St. Thomas Aquinas and then traveled to Madison Square Garden in New York to play Georgia and ultimately St. John's in the championship game. Gonzaga also played in the 12th annual Battle in Seattle at KeyArena against Cal Poly. Gonzaga played 18 conference games (home-and-home) during the season.

Date time, TV	Rank^{#}	Opponent^{#}	Result	Record	High points	High rebounds	High assists	Site (attendance) city, state
Exhibition
11/01/2014*; 6:00 PM, KHQ	No. 13	Thompson Rivers	W 95–69	-	15 – Wesley	8 – Wesley	4 – Tied	McCarthey Athletic Center (-); Spokane, WA
11/08/2014*	No. 13	vs. Texas; Secret Scrimmage	W 73–56	-	–	–	–	GCU Arena (-); Phoenix, AZ
Regular Season
11/14/2014*; 6:00 pm, KHQ/RTNW	No. 13	Sacramento State	W 104–58	1–0	18 – Wiltjer	8 – Sabonis	6 – Perkins	McCarthey Athletic Center (6,000); Spokane, WA
11/17/2014*; 8:00 pm, ESPN2	No. 13	No. 22 SMU; ESPN Tip-Off Marathon	W 72–56	2–0	17 – Pangos	9 – Sabonis	7 – Pangos	McCarthey Athletic Center (6,000); Spokane, WA
11/19/2014*; 8:00 pm, ESPNU	No. 13	Saint Joseph's; NIT Season Tip-Off	W 94–42	3–0	18 – Bell Jr.	11 – Sabonis	6 – Tied	McCarthey Athletic Center (6,000); Spokane, WA
11/22/2014*; 6:00 pm, KHQ/RTNW	No. 13	St. Thomas Aquinas; NIT Season Tip-Off	W 109–55	4–0	24 – Nunez	11 – Tied	7 – Tied	McCarthey Athletic Center (6,000); Spokane, WA
11/26/2014*; 6:30 pm, ESPN2	No. 10	vs. Georgia; NIT Season Tip-Off Semifinals	W 88–76	5–0	32 – Wiltjer	6 – Tied	6 – Pangos	Madison Square Garden (5,128); New York, NY
11/28/2014*; 4:00 pm, ESPN2	No. 10	vs. St. John's; NIT Season Tip-Off Finals	W 73–66	6–0	14 – Sabonis	9 – Sabonis	9 – Pangos	Madison Square Garden (5,548); New York, NY
12/02/2014*; 6:00 pm, KHQ/RTNW	No. 9	Southeastern Louisiana	W 76–57	7–0	20 – Wiltjer	9 – Karnowski	3 – Tied	McCarthey Athletic Center (6,000); Spokane, WA
12/06/2014*; 2:15 pm, ESPN	No. 9	at No. 3 Arizona	L 63–66 ^{OT}	7–1	15 – Wiltjer	7 – Karnowski	6 – Pangos	McKale Center (14,655); Tucson, AZ
12/10/2014*; 8:00 pm, ESPNU	No. 9	vs. Washington State	W 81–66	8–1	22 – Karnowski	9 – Wesley	4 – Wiltjer	Spokane Arena (11,521); Spokane, WA
12/13/2014*; 7:00 pm, ESPN2	No. 9	at UCLA	W 87–74	9–1	24 – Wiltjer	9 – Wesley	5 – Dranginis	Pauley Pavilion (10,006); Los Angeles, CA
12/15/2014*; 6:00 pm, KHQ/RTNW	No. 8	Texas Southern	W 94–54	10–1	21 – Wiltjer	7 – Nunez	6 – Pangos	McCarthey Athletic Center (6,000); Spokane, WA
12/20/2014*; 7:00 pm, KHQ/RTNW	No. 8	vs. Cal Poly; Battle in Seattle	W 63–50	11–1	16 – Tied	8 – Karnowski	3 – Dranginis	KeyArena (11,741); Seattle, WA
12/27/2014; 3:00 pm, ESPN2	No. 8	at BYU	W 87–80	12–1 (1–0)	24 – Wiltjer	10 – Tied	7 – Pangos	Marriott Center (20,900); Provo, UT
12/29/2014; 8:00 pm, KHQ/RTNW	No. 7	at San Diego	W 60–48	13–1 (2–0)	15 – Wiltjer	8 – Karnowski	4 – Pangos	Jenny Craig Pavilion (4,517); San Diego, CA
01/03/2015; 6:30 pm, ESPN2	No. 7	at Portland	W 87–75	14–1 (3–0)	21 – Tied	6 – Sabonis	5 – Pangos	Chiles Center (4,852); Portland, OR
01/08/2015; 6:00 pm, KHQ/RTNW	No. 6	San Francisco	W 88–57	15–1 (4–0)	17 – Pangos	9 – Sabonis	5 – Pangos	McCarthey Athletic Center (6,000); Spokane, WA
01/10/2015; 1:00 pm, KHQ/RTNW	No. 6	Santa Clara	W 79–57	16–1 (5–0)	18 – Karnowski	9 – Tied	4 – Pangos	McCarthey Athletic Center (6,000); Spokane, WA
01/15/2015; 7:30 pm, KHQ/RTNW	No. 3	at Pepperdine	W 78–76	17–1 (6–0)	24 – Wiltjer	12 – Sabonis	5 – Pangos	Firestone Fieldhouse (3,250); Malibu, CA
01/17/2015; 1:00 pm, KHQ/RTNW	No. 3	at Loyola Marymount	W 72–55	18–1 (7–0)	17 – Bell	8 – Sabonis	6 – Pangos	Gersten Pavilion (4,026); Los Angeles, CA
01/22/2015; 8:00 pm, ESPNU	No. 3	Saint Mary's	W 68–47	19–1 (8–0)	14 – Pangos	13 – Sabonis	5 – Pangos	McCarthey Athletic Center (6,000); Spokane, WA
01/24/2015; 5:00 pm, KHQ/RTNW	No. 3	Pacific	W 91–60	20–1 (9–0)	13 – Tied	8 – Sabonis	4 – Wiltjer	McCarthey Athletic Center (6,000); Spokane, WA
01/29/2015; 6:00 pm, KHQ/RTNW	No. 3	Portland	W 64–46	21–1 (10–0)	13 – Sabonis	11 – Sabonis	4 – Karnowski	McCarthey Athletic Center (6,000); Spokane, WA
01/31/2015*; 7:00 pm, ESPN2	No. 3	Memphis	W 82–64	22–1	17 – Karnowski	11 – Sabonis	5 – Tied	McCarthey Athletic Center (6,000); Spokane, WA
02/05/2015; 8:00 pm, ESPN2	No. 2	at Santa Clara	W 77–63	23–1 (11–0)	22 – Wiltjer	9 – Sabonis	7 – Pangos	Leavey Center (4,700); Santa Clara, CA
02/07/2015; 8:30 pm, ESPN2	No. 2	at San Francisco	W 81–70	24–1 (12–0)	29 – Wiltjer	11 – Wiltjer	4 – Pangos	War Memorial Gymnasium (4,000); San Francisco, CA
02/12/2015; 6:00 pm, KHQ/RTNW	No. 3	Loyola Marymount	W 80–51	25–1 (13–0)	21 – Wiltjer	10 – Wiltjer	8 – Pangos	McCarthey Athletic Center (6,000); Spokane, WA
02/14/2015; 5:00 pm, KHQ/RTNW	No. 3	Pepperdine	W 56–48	26–1 (14–0)	19 – Pangos	7 – Karnowski	3 – Tied	McCarthey Athletic Center (6,000); Spokane, WA
02/19/2015; 8:00 pm, KHQ/RTNW	No. 3	at Pacific	W 86–74	27–1 (15–0)	45 – Wiltjer	6 – Wiltjer	8 – Pangos	Alex G. Spanos Center (5,672); Stockton, CA
02/21/2015; 7:00 pm, ESPN2	No. 3	at Saint Mary's	W 70–60	28–1 (16–0)	16 – Wiltjer	12 – Wiltjer	7 – Pangos	McKeon Pavilion (3,500); Moraga, CA
02/26/2015; 8:00 pm, ESPN2	No. 3	San Diego	W 59–39	29–1 (17–0)	14 – Karnowski	8 – Karnowski	4 – Pangos	McCarthey Athletic Center (6,000); Spokane, WA
02/28/2015; 7:00 pm, ESPN2	No. 3	BYU	L 70–73	29–2 (17–1)	17 – Wesley	9 – Wesley	5 – Pangos	McCarthey Athletic Center (6,000); Spokane, WA
WCC Tournament
03/07/2015; 6:00 pm, ESPN2	No. 7	vs. San Francisco; Quarterfinals	W 81–72	30–2	24 – Karnowski	8 – Wiltjer	5 – Pangos	Orleans Arena (8,537); Las Vegas, NV
03/09/2015; 6:00 PM, ESPN	No. 7	vs. Pepperdine; Semifinals	W 79–61	31–2	25 – Wesley	9 – Wiltjer	6 – Pangos	Orleans Arena (8,546); Las Vegas, NV
03/10/2015; 6:00 PM, ESPN	No. 7	vs. BYU; Final	W 91–75	32–2	18 – Wiltjer	10 – Wiltjer	5 – Pangos	Orleans Arena (8,585); Las Vegas, NV
NCAA tournament
03/20/2015*; 7:10 pm, TNT	(2 S) No. 7	vs. (15 S) North Dakota State; Second round	W 86–76	33–2	23 – Wiltjer	11 – Sabonis	5 – Pangos	KeyArena (14,852); Seattle, WA
03/22/2015*; 4:10 pm, TBS	(2 S) No. 7	vs. (7 S) Iowa; Third round	W 87–68	34–2	24 – Wiltjer	9 – Sabonis	4 – Tied	KeyArena (14,901); Seattle, WA
03/27/2015*; 4:15 pm, CBS	(2 S) No. 7	vs. (11 S) UCLA; Sweet Sixteen	W 74–62	35–2	18 – Karnowski	10 – Wiltjer	4 – Wiltjer	NRG Stadium (21,168); Houston, TX
03/29/2015*; 2:05 pm, CBS	(2 S) No. 7	vs. (1 S) No. 4 Duke; Elite Eight	L 52–66	35–3	16 – Wiltjer	5 – Tied	2 – Tied	NRG Stadium (20,744); Houston, TX
*Non-conference game. ^{#}Rankings from AP Poll. (#) Tournament seedings in parentheses. S=South Region. All times are in Pacific Time.

== See also ==
- 2014–15 Gonzaga Bulldogs women's basketball team
- 2014–15 West Coast Conference men's basketball season
