= 2018 EuroLeague Final Four =

European professional basketball tournament

- The official logo was unveiled on 13 February 2018
- Season: 2017–18 EuroLeague

Tournament details
- Arena: Štark Arena; Belgrade, Serbia
- Dates: 18–20 May 2018

Final positions
- Champions: (Spain) Real Madrid (10th title)
- Runners-up: (Turkey) Fenerbahçe Doğuş
- Third place: (Lithuania) Žalgiris
- Fourth place: (Russia) CSKA Moscow

Awards and statistics
- MVP: (Slovenia) Luka Dončić
- Top scorer(s): (Italy) Nicolo Melli (32 points)

The 2018 EuroLeague Final Four was the concluding EuroLeague Final Four tournament of the 2017–18 EuroLeague season, the 61st season of Europe's premier club basketball tournament, and the 18th season since it was organised by Euroleague Basketball. It was the 31st Final Four of the modern EuroLeague Final Four era (1988–present), and the 33rd time overall that the competition had concluded with a final four format. The Final Four was played at the Štark Arena in Belgrade, Serbia, on 18 and 20 May 2018.

== Venue ==
On 26 October 2016 Euroleague Basketball announced that the Final Four would be held in the Štark Arena in Belgrade. It is designed as a universal hall for sports, cultural events and other programs. It was the first time the EuroLeague Final Four was hosted in Belgrade, or in the country of Serbia. The Arena's total floor area is 48,000 square metres. For sports, it has a regular seating capacity for fans of 18,386, and also has 70 luxury boxes, which include a total of 860 seats. The arena's cost was estimated at €70 million. Štark Arena is a member of the European Arenas Association (EAA).

Belgrade	2018 EuroLeague Final Four (Europe)
Štark Arena	2018 EuroLeague Final Four (Europe)
Capacity: 18,386	2018 EuroLeague Final Four (Europe)

== Background ==
=== CSKA Moscow ===
CSKA Moscow finished the regular season as the number one seed, after having a 24–6 record. In the quarter-finals, the team played another Russian side in Khimki. CSKA won the series 3–1 over Khimki, after a controversial 88–89 win in Game 4. In the United League season, CSKA was in second place while battling for the first seed.

=== Fenerbahçe Doğuş ===
Fenerbahçe finished second in the regular season and defeated Kirolbet Baskonia in the quarter-finals. Fenerbahçe reached the Final Four for a fourth straight year. Head coach Željko Obradović had the opportunity to win his tenth EuroLeague title, a record for most titles by a coach.

=== Real Madrid ===
Madrid battled injuries during the regular season, as Sergio Llull, Ognjen Kuzmić and Rudy Fernández missed most of the games. As a five-seed, the team beat Panathinaikos in a controversial quarterfinal series, 1–3. The star player for Madrid during the season was Luka Dončić, who led the league in Performance Index Rating (PIR), and was later a top-three pick in the 2018 NBA draft. Dončić's games during the Final Four were televised in the United States, by NBA TV.

In the 2017–18 ACB season, Real Madrid was the number one seed.

=== Žalgiris ===
In the regular season, Žalgiris qualified as the sixth seed. Žalgiris won the series over favored Olympiacos, 3–1. For EuroLeague Legend Šarūnas Jasikevičius, this was his first visit to the Final Four as a head coach and also for the club since 1999. In its domestic LKL season, the club dominated as well, as it was in a secure first seed.

== Bracket ==
Semifinals
18 May
(Russia) CSKA Moscow	83
(Spain) Real Madrid	92
18 May
(Turkey) Fenerbahçe Doğuş	76
(Lithuania) Žalgiris	67

Championship game
20 May
(Spain) Real Madrid	85
(Turkey) Fenerbahçe Doğuş	80
Third place game
20 May
(Russia) CSKA Moscow	77
(Lithuania) Žalgiris	79

== Semifinals ==
=== Semifinal A ===
Russian champions CSKA Moscow returned to the Final Four to make it their seventh consecutive semi-final appearance. CSKA guard Sergio Rodríguez would play the semi-final against his former club, which he won the EuroLeague title with in 2015, as well as the EuroLeague MVP award in 2014.

Real Madrid would play its fourth Final Four in five years. The match would be a re-match of the 2017 third-place game. During the regular season, both teams won their respective games at home, with this game being considered a Real Madrid home game.

18 May 2018	CSKA Moscow (Russia)	83–92	(Spain) Real Madrid	Belgrade, Serbia
21:00 UTC+02:00	Scoring by quarter: 30–20, 16–27, 10–16, 27–29
	Pts: De Colo 20; Rebs: Hines 9 Asts: Rodríguez 6 PIR: Hines 23	Boxscore	Pts: Dončić, Llull 16; Rebs: Ayón 11; Asts: Llull 5 PIR: three players 18	Arena: Štark Arena; Attendance: 15,232; Referees: Luigi Lamonica (ITA), Robert Lottermoser (GER), Matej Boltauzer (SLO)

Starters:			Pts	Reb	Ast
PG	13	(Spain) Sergio Rodríguez	5	2	6
SG	22	(United States) Cory Higgins	15	2	3
SF	41	(Russia) Nikita Kurbanov	7	1	0
PF	11	(Russia) Semyon Antonov	0	0	0
C	44	(United States) Othello Hunter	4	7	0
Reserves:					
PG	1	(France) Nando de Colo	20	1	1
C	3	(United States) Victor Rudd	0	0	0
SG	7	(Russia) Vitaly Fridzon	0	0	0
PF	20	(Russia) Andrey Vorontsevich	0	1	1
SF	21	(United States) Will Clyburn	16	7	2
PF	31	(Russia) Victor Khryapa	0	1	0
C	42	(United States) Kyle Hines	16	9	1
Head coach:
(Hellenic Basketball Federation) Dimitrios Itoudis

CSKA Moscow	Real Madrid

CSKA	Statistics	R.Madrid
18/44 (40.9%)	2-pt field goals	17/34 (50%)
10/24 (41.7%)	3-pt field goals	12/27 (44.4%)
17/19 (89.5%)	Free throws	22/36 (61.1%)
13	Offensive rebounds	14
25	Defensive rebounds	29
38	Total rebounds	43
14	Assists	20
13	Turnovers	13
4	Steals	6
3	Blocks	5
29	Fouls	22

Starters:			Pts	Reb	Ast
PG	11	(Argentina) Facundo Campazzo	0	1	1
SG	7	(Slovenia) Luka Dončić	16	7	2
SF	44	(Sweden) Jeffery Taylor	3	1	0
PF	9	(Spain) Felipe Reyes	5	2	0
C	14	(Mexico) Gustavo Ayón	12	11	1
Reserves:					
SG	1	(France) Fabien Causeur	6	2	3
PF	3	(Slovenia) Anthony Randolph	2	2	2
SF	5	(Spain) Rudy Fernández	6	2	2
SG	20	(Azerbaijan) Jaycee Carroll	9	2	3
C	22	(Cape Verde) Edy Tavares	5	0	0
PG	23	(Spain) Sergio Llull	16	0	5
PF	33	(United States) Trey Thompkins	12	6	1
Head coach:
(Spanish Basketball Federation) Pablo Laso

=== Semifinal B ===
Defending champions Fenerbahçe Doğuş returned to the Final Four to make it their third straight appearance. Led by head coach Željko Obradović, the all-time record holder for most EuroLeague championships won by a head coach, it defeated Kirolbet Baskonia 1–3 in the quarter-finals, to clinch a semi-final spot.

Žalgiris Kaunas qualified for its first Final Four in 20 years, as the last time the team participated was in 1999, where it claimed the championship as well. The club beat Olympiacos 3–1 in the play-offs, despite not having home court advantage.

18 May 2018	Fenerbahçe Doğuş (Turkey)	76–67	(Lithuania) Žalgiris Kaunas	Belgrade, Serbia
18:00 UTC+02:00	Scoring by quarter: 19–13, 20–20, 15–17, 22–17
	Pts: Muhammed 19; Rebs: Düverioğlu 5 Asts: Melli 6 PIR: Muhammed 18	Boxscore	Pts: Pangos 16; Rebs: Davies 11; Asts: Micić, Pangos 4 PIR: Davies 21	Arena: Štark Arena; Attendance: 16,967; Referees: Daniel Hierrezuelo (ESP), Sreten Radović (CRO), Oļegs Latiševs (LAT)

Starters:			Pts	Reb	Ast
PG	11	(United States) Brad Wanamaker	9	1	3
SG	23	(Serbia) Marko Gudurić	0	0	1
SF	33	(Serbia) Nikola Kalinić	2	1	2
PF	24	(Czech Republic) Jan Veselý	8	3	0
C	44	(Jordan) Ahmet Düverioğlu	4	5	0
Reserves:					
PF	1	(United States) Jason Thompson	0	2	0
PF	4	(Italy) Nicolò Melli	4	3	6
SG	10	(Turkey) Melih Mahmutoğlu	DNP		
PG	16	(Greece) Kostas Sloukas	14	1	3
SF	21	(United States) James Nunnally	0	0	1
PG	35	(Turkey) Ali Muhammed	19	1	0
SF	70	(Italy) Luigi Datome	16	2	0
Head coach:
(Basketball Federation of Serbia) Željko Obradović

Fenerbahçe	Žalgiris

Fenerbahçe	Statistics	Žalgiris
24/42 (57.1%)	2-pt field goals	21/40 (52.5%)
7/18 (38.9%)	3-pt field goals	2/10 (20%)
7/11 (63.6%)	Free throws	19/27 (70.4%)
9	Offensive rebounds	16
13	Defensive rebounds	21
22	Total rebounds	37
16	Assists	13
10	Turnovers	20
13	Steals	5
3	Blocks	2
27	Fouls	19

Starters:			Pts	Reb	Ast
PG	3	(Canada) Kevin Pangos	16	5	4
SG	92	(Lithuania) Edgaras Ulanovas	7	3	0
SF	6	(France) Axel Toupane	6	1	1
PF	13	(Lithuania) Paulius Jankūnas	4	4	0
C	0	(United States) Brandon Davies	12	11	2
Reserves:					
PG	9	(Slovenia) Beno Udrih	2	1	0
C	19	(Lithuania) Martynas Sajus	DNP		
SG	21	(Lithuania) Artūras Milaknis	0	0	1
SG	22	(Serbia) Vasilije Micić	5	1	4
PF	30	(United States) Aaron White	10	6	0
C	44	(Lithuania) Antanas Kavaliauskas	5	2	1
PG	66	(Lithuania) Paulius Valinskas	DNP		
Head coach:
(Lithuanian Basketball Federation) Šarūnas Jasikevičius

== Third place game ==
20 May 2018	CSKA Moscow (Russia)	77–79	(Lithuania) Žalgiris Kaunas	Belgrade
17:00 UTC+02:00	Scoring by quarter: 19–22, 16–19, 13–28, 29–10
	Pts: Kulagin, Hunter 14; Rebs: Hunter 8 Asts: three players 3 PIR: Hunter 25	Boxscore	Pts: Jankūnas, Micić 15; Rebs: White 7 Asts: Pangos, Micić 4 PIR: Jankūnas 17	Arena: Štark Arena; Attendance: 14,548; Referees: Daniel Hierrezuelo (ESP), Elias Koromilas (GRE), Robert Lottermoser (GER)

Starters:			Pts	Reb	Ast
PG	13	(Spain) Sergio Rodríguez	9	1	3
SG	22	(United States) Cory Higgins	12	3	0
SF	41	(Russia) Nikita Kurbanov	0	0	3
PF	11	(Russia) Semyon Antonov	0	0	1
C	44	(United States) Othello Hunter	14	8	0
Reserves:					
PG	1	(France) Nando de Colo	5	1	2
C	3	(United States) Victor Rudd	7	1	1
SG	7	(Russia) Vitaly Fridzon	5	0	0
SF	21	(United States) Will Clyburn	2	3	1
PG	30	(Russia) Mikhail Kulagin	14	2	1
PF	31	(Russia) Victor Khryapa	3	1	0
C	42	(United States) Kyle Hines	6	3	3
Head coach:
(Hellenic Basketball Federation) Dimitrios Itoudis

CSKA Moscow	Žalgiris

CSKA	Statistics	Žalgiris
14/37 (37.8%)	2-pt field goals	25/43 (58.1%)
12/29 (41.4%)	3-pt field goals	5/11 (45.5%)
13/24 (54.2%)	Free throws	14/21 (66.7%)
13	Offensive rebounds	10
18	Defensive rebounds	27
31	Total rebounds	37
15	Assists	16
9	Turnovers	19
8	Steals	1
5	Blocks	1
23	Fouls	25

Starters:			Pts	Reb	Ast
PG	3	(Canada) Kevin Pangos	9	1	4
SG	92	(Lithuania) Edgaras Ulanovas	14	1	0
SF	6	(France) Axel Toupane	6	4	0
PF	13	(Lithuania) Paulius Jankūnas	15	5	2
C	0	(United States) Brandon Davies	2	4	1
Reserves:					
PG	9	(Slovenia) Beno Udrih	2	2	2
PF	20	(Lithuania) Gytis Masiulis	DNP		
SG	21	(Lithuania) Artūras Milaknis	3	3	1
SG	22	(Serbia) Vasilije Micić	15	4	4
PF	30	(United States) Aaron White	4	7	2
C	44	(Lithuania) Antanas Kavaliauskas	9	5	0
PG	66	(Lithuania) Paulius Valinskas	DNP		
Head coach:
(Lithuanian Basketball Federation) Šarūnas Jasikevičius

== Championship game ==
20 May 2018	Real Madrid (Spain)	85–80	(Turkey) Fenerbahçe Doğuş	Belgrade
20:00 UTC+02:00	Scoring by quarter: 21–17, 17–23, 25–15, 22–25
	Pts: Causeur 17; Rebs: three players 5 Asts: Dončić 4 PIR: Causeur 21	Boxscore	Pts: Melli 28; Rebs: Melli 6 Asts: Wanamaker 5 PIR: Melli 27	Arena: Štark Arena; Attendance: 16,967; Referees: Luigi Lamonica (ITA), Borys Ryzhyk (UKR), Oļegs Latiševs (LAT)

Starters:			Pts	Reb	Ast
PG	11	(Argentina) Facundo Campazzo	0	1	0
SG	7	(Slovenia) Luka Dončić	15	3	4
SF	1	(France) Fabien Causeur	17	2	2
PF	9	(Spain) Felipe Reyes	6	3	0
C	14	(Mexico) Gustavo Ayón	4	2	1
Reserves:					
PF	3	(Slovenia) Anthony Randolph	3	1	0
SF	5	(Spain) Rudy Fernández	5	5	3
SG	20	(Azerbaijan) Jaycee Carroll	9	0	0
C	22	(Cape Verde) Edy Tavares	8	5	2
PG	23	(Spain) Sergio Llull	5	0	2
PF	33	(United States) Trey Thompkins	10	5	1
SF	44	(Sweden) Jeffery Taylor	3	3	1
Head coach:
(Spanish Basketball Federation) Pablo Laso

Real Madrid	Fenerbahçe

R.Madrid	Statistics	Fenerbahçe
16/32 (50%)	2-pt field goals	21/39 (53.8%)
9/21 (42.9%)	3-pt field goals	7/20 (35%)
26/34 (76.5%)	Free throws	17/20 (85%)
13	Offensive rebounds	10
24	Defensive rebounds	19
37	Total rebounds	29
16	Assists	17
12	Turnovers	12
8	Steals	4
3	Blocks	2
26	Fouls	27

2017–18 EuroLeague champions

Real Madrid
10th title

Starters:			Pts	Reb	Ast
PG	11	(United States) Brad Wanamaker	14	5	5
SG	23	(Serbia) Marko Gudurić	0	1	2
SF	33	(Serbia) Nikola Kalinić	7	3	1
PF	24	(Czech Republic) Jan Veselý	3	5	2
C	44	(Jordan) Ahmet Düverioğlu	8	1	0
Reserves:					
PF	1	(United States) Jason Thompson	0	0	0
PF	4	(Italy) Nicolò Melli	28	6	1
SG	10	(Turkey) Melih Mahmutoğlu	DNP		
PG	16	(Greece) Kostas Sloukas	7	1	4
SF	21	(United States) James Nunnally	0	0	1
PG	35	(Turkey) Ali Muhammed	7	2	1
SF	70	(Italy) Luigi Datome	6	2	0
Head coach:
(Basketball Federation of Serbia) Željko Obradović

- Team captains (C): (Spain) Felipe Reyes (Real Madrid and (Turkey) Melih Mahmutoğlu (Fenerbahçe )
