= 2017–18 EuroLeague =

EuroLeague season

2017–18 Turkish Airlines EuroLeague^{1}
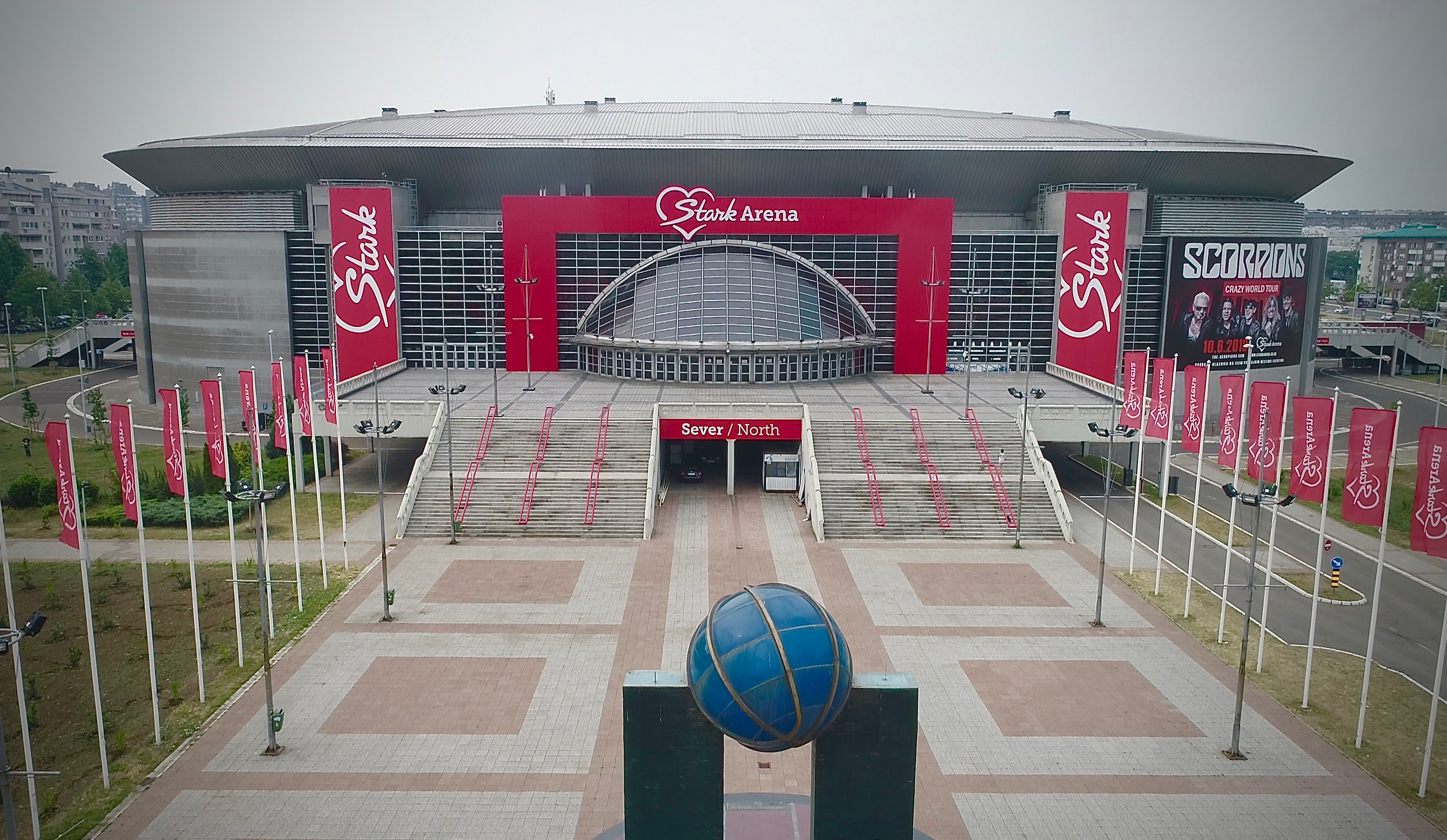
- The Štark Arena in Belgrade hosted the Final Four
- Season: 2017–18
- Duration: 12 October 2017 – 20 May 2018
- Games played: 260
- Teams: 16

Regular season
- Season MVP: (Slovenia) Luka Dončić

Finals
- Champions: (Spain) Real Madrid (10th title)
- Runners-up: (Turkey) Fenerbahçe Doğuş
- Third place: (Lithuania) Žalgiris
- Fourth place: (Russia) CSKA Moscow
- Final Four MVP: (Slovenia) Luka Dončić

Awards
- Best Defender: (United States) Kyle Hines
- Rising Star: (Slovenia) Luka Dončić
- Coach of the Year: (Spain) Pablo Laso

Statistical leaders
Points	(Russia) Alexey Shved	21.8
Rebounds	(United States) James Augustine	6.7
Assists	(Greece) Nick Calathes	8.0
Index Rating	(Slovenia) Luka Dončić	21.5

Records
- Biggest home win: Valencia Basket 91–53 Unicaja (27 October 2017)
- Biggest away win: AX Milan 62–94 Žalgiris (9 November 2017)
- Highest scoring: AX Milan 102–111 Maccabi Tel Aviv (26 January 2018)
- Winning streak: 7 games Real Madrid
- Losing streak: 10 games Valencia Basket
- Highest attendance: 18,243; Panathinaikos 82–89 Real Madrid (19 April 2018)
- Lowest attendance: 1,920; Anadolu Efes 83–107 Barcelona (29 March 2018)
- ^{1} Sponsored league name, referring to Turkish Airlines.

The 2017–18 Turkish Airlines EuroLeague was the 18th season of the modern era of Euroleague Basketball and the eighth under the title sponsorship of the Turkish Airlines. Including the competition's previous incarnation as the FIBA Europe Champions Cup, this was the 61st season of the premier competition for European men's professional basketball clubs.

The 2018 EuroLeague Final Four was played at the Štark Arena, in Belgrade, Serbia. Real Madrid won its record tenth EuroLeague title, after defeating defending champions Fenerbahçe Doğuş in the championship game.

== Team allocation ==
A total of sixteen teams participate. The labels in the parentheses show how each team qualified for the place of its starting round (TH: EuroLeague title holders). Eleven teams were placed as Licensed Clubs, long-term licenses, while five spots were given to Associated Clubs, based on merit.

- LC: Qualified as a licensed club with a long-term licence
- 1st, 2nd, etc.: League position after Playoffs
- EC: EuroCup champion
- WC: Wild card

Licensed Clubs		Associated Clubs	
(Spain) Baskonia (LC)	(Turkey) Anadolu Efes (LC)	(Spain) Unicaja (EC)	(Germany) Brose Bamberg (1st)
(Spain) FC Barcelona Lassa (LC)	(Turkey) Fenerbahçe Doğuş^{TH} (LC)	(Spain) Valencia Basket (1st)	(Serbia) Crvena zvezda mts (1st)
(Spain) Real Madrid (LC)	(Italy) AX Armani Exchange Milan (LC)	(Russia) Khimki (2nd)	
(Greece) Olympiacos (LC)	(Lithuania) Žalgiris (LC)		
(Greece) Panathinaikos Superfoods (LC)	(Russia) CSKA Moscow (LC)		
(Israel) Maccabi FOX Tel Aviv (LC)

Notes

1. ABA League (ABA): Serbian Crvena zvezda mts qualified through the ABA League.
2. VTB United League (VTB): Russian Khimki qualified through the VTB United League.

== Teams ==
A total of 16 teams from 9 countries took part in the league, including 11 sides with a long-term licence from the 2016–17 season, 1 team qualified from the EuroCup and the 4 highest-placed teams from the ABA League, the German Bundesliga, the VTB United League and Spain's ACB.

Brose Bamberg and Crvena zvezda qualified, after winning the Bundesliga and ABA League titles respectively. Galatasaray Odeabank and Darüşşafaka did not appear this season, as Galatasaray did not have any opportunity in the previous season to qualify and Darüşşafaka finished their two-year wild card. UNICS lost its place in the EuroLeague, as Khimki qualified as runner-up of the VTB United League. Unicaja qualified as the EuroCup champions, after beating Valencia Basket in the Finals. However, Valencia also qualified as the Spanish champions.

=== Venues and locations ===
Location of teams in 2017–18 EuroLeague

Team	Home city	Arena	Capacity
(Turkey) Anadolu Efes	Istanbul	Sinan Erdem Dome	16,000
(Italy) AX Armani Exchange Olimpia	Milan	Mediolanum Forum	12,700
(Germany) Brose Bamberg	Bamberg	Brose Arena	6,150
(Serbia) Crvena zvezda mts	Belgrade	Štark Arena	18,386
(Serbia) Crvena zvezda mts	Belgrade	Aleksandar Nikolić (Note: The Aleksandar Nikolić was being used as back-up arena by Crvena zvezda, in case the Štark Arena was not available.)	5,878
(Russia) CSKA Moscow	Moscow	Megasport Arena	13,344
(Spain) FC Barcelona Lassa	Barcelona	Palau Blaugrana	7,585
(Turkey) Fenerbahçe Doğuş	Istanbul	Ülker Sports Arena	13,059
(Russia) Khimki	Khimki	Mytishchi Arena	7,280
(Spain) Kirolbet Baskonia	Vitoria-Gasteiz	Fernando Buesa Arena	15,504
(Israel) Maccabi FOX Tel Aviv	Tel Aviv	Menora Mivtachim Arena	10,383
(Greece) Olympiacos	Piraeus, Athens	Peace and Friendship Stadium	11,640
(Greece) Panathinaikos Superfoods	Marousi, Athens	Olympic Sports Center Athens	18,989
(Spain) Real Madrid	Madrid	WiZink Center	15,000
(Spain) Unicaja	Málaga	Martín Carpena	11,300
(Spain) Valencia Basket	Valencia	Fuente de San Luis	8,500
(Lithuania) Žalgiris	Kaunas	Žalgirio Arena	15,552

=== Personnel and sponsorship ===
Team	Head coach	Captain	Kit manufacturer	Shirt sponsor
(Turkey) Anadolu Efes	(Turkey) Ergin Ataman	(Turkey) Doğuş Balbay	Adidas	Anadolu Efes
(Italy) AX Armani Exchange Olimpia	(Italy) Simone Pianigiani	(Italy) Andrea Cinciarini	Armani	Armani Exchange
(Germany) Brose Bamberg	(Italy) Luca Banchi	(Germany) Elias Harris	Macron	Brose
(Serbia) Crvena zvezda mts	(Serbia) Dušan Alimpijević	(Serbia) Branko Lazić	Nike	Mobile Telephony of Serbia
(Russia) CSKA Moscow	(Greece) Dimitrios Itoudis	(Russia) Victor Khryapa	Nike	Rostelecom
(Spain) FC Barcelona Lassa	(Serbia) Svetislav Pešić	(Spain) Juan Carlos Navarro	Nike	Lassa Tyres
(Turkey) Fenerbahçe Doğuş	(Serbia) Željko Obradović	(Turkey) Melih Mahmutoğlu	Nike	Doğuş Group
(Russia) Khimki	(Greece) Georgios Bartzokas	(Russia) Sergei Monia	Adidas	Khimki Group
(Spain) Kirolbet Baskonia	(Spain) Pedro Martínez	(Georgia (country)) Tornike Shengelia	Kelme	Kirolbet
(Israel) Maccabi FOX Tel Aviv	(Croatia) Neven Spahija	(Israel) John DiBartolomeo	Nike	FOX
(Greece) Olympiacos	(Greece) Ioannis Sfairopoulos	(Greece) Vassilis Spanoulis	Nike	Skrats
(Greece) Panathinaikos Superfoods	(Spain) Xavi Pascual	(Greece) Ian Vougioukas	Adidas	Pame Stoixima
(Spain) Real Madrid	(Spain) Pablo Laso	(Spain) Felipe Reyes	Adidas	European University
(Spain) Unicaja	(Spain) Joan Plaza	(Spain) Carlos Suárez	Spalding	Unicaja, Andalusia
(Spain) Valencia Basket	(Spain) Txus Vidorreta	(Spain) Rafa Martínez	Luanvi	Cultura del Esfuerzo^{1}
(Lithuania) Žalgiris	(Lithuania) Šarūnas Jasikevičius	(Lithuania) Paulius Jankūnas	Adidas	Skycop

Notes
1. Cultura del Esfuerzo (English: "Culture of Effort") is the motto of the club.

=== Managerial changes ===
Team	Outgoing manager	Manner of departure	Date of vacancy	Position in table	Replaced with	Date of appointment
(Spain) FC Barcelona Lassa	(Greece) Georgios Bartzokas	Sacked	7 June 2017	Pre-season	(Spain) Sito Alonso	16 June 2017
(Spain) Kirolbet Baskonia	(Spain) Sito Alonso	Mutual consent	16 June 2017	Pre-season	(Argentina) Pablo Prigioni	16 June 2017
(Spain) Valencia Basket	(Spain) Pedro Martínez	End of contract	20 June 2017	Pre-season	(Spain) Txus Vidorreta	20 June 2017
(Israel) Maccabi FOX Tel Aviv	(Latvia) Ainars Bagatskis	Sacked	16 May 2017	Pre-season	(Croatia) Neven Spahija	26 June 2017
(Italy) AX Armani Exchange Olimpia	(Croatia) Jasmin Repeša	Mutual consent	3 June 2017	Pre-season	(Italy) Simone Pianigiani	26 June 2017
(Russia) Khimki	(Montenegro) Duško Ivanović	Sacked	29 June 2017	Pre-season	(Greece) Georgios Bartzokas	30 June 2017
(Serbia) Crvena zvezda mts	(Montenegro) Dejan Radonjić	End of contract	15 July 2017	Pre-season	(Serbia) Dušan Alimpijević	21 July 2017
(Spain) Baskonia	(Argentina) Pablo Prigioni	Resigned	25 October 2017	16th (0–3)	(Spain) Pedro Martínez	27 October 2017
(Turkey) Anadolu Efes	(Croatia) Velimir Perasović	Sacked	16 December 2017	15th (3–9)	(Turkey) Ergin Ataman	18 December 2017
(Spain) FC Barcelona Lassa	(Spain) Sito Alonso	Sacked	4 February 2018	13th (7–14)	(Serbia) Svetislav Pešić	9 February 2018
(Germany) Brose Bamberg	(Italy) Andrea Trinchieri	Sacked	19 February 2018	13th (8–14)	(Italy) Luca Banchi	4 March 2018

== Regular season ==
In the regular season, teams play against each other home and away in a round-robin format. The top eight teams advance to the playoffs and the bottom eight teams are eliminated. The regular season runs from 12 October 2017 to 6 April 2018.

=== League table ===
Pos	Team	Pld	W	L	PF	PA	PD	Qualification
1	(Russia) CSKA Moscow	30	24	6	2675	2377	+298	Advance to Playoffs
2	(Turkey) Fenerbahçe Doğuş	30	21	9	2381	2208	+173	Advance to Playoffs
3	(Greece) Olympiacos	30	19	11	2268	2250	+18	Advance to Playoffs
4	(Greece) Panathinaikos Superfoods	30	19	11	2334	2291	+43	Advance to Playoffs
5	(Spain) Real Madrid	30	19	11	2576	2375	+201	Advance to Playoffs
6	(Lithuania) Žalgiris	30	18	12	2417	2389	+28	Advance to Playoffs
7	(Spain) Kirolbet Baskonia	30	16	14	2487	2373	+114	Advance to Playoffs
8	(Russia) Khimki	30	16	14	2338	2352	−14	Advance to Playoffs
9	(Spain) Unicaja	30	13	17	2347	2435	−88	
10	(Israel) Maccabi Tel Aviv	30	13	17	2440	2530	−90	
11	(Spain) Valencia Basket	30	12	18	2336	2420	−84	
12	(Germany) Brose Bamberg	30	11	19	2309	2446	−137	
13	(Spain) FC Barcelona Lassa	30	11	19	2456	2404	+52	
14	(Serbia) Crvena zvezda mts	30	11	19	2333	2515	−182	
15	(Italy) AX Armani Exchange Olimpia	30	10	20	2407	2530	−123	
16	(Turkey) Anadolu Efes	30	7	23	2321	2530	−209	

Source: EuroLeague
Rules for classification: All points scored in extra period(s) will not be counted in the standings, nor for any tie-break situation.

=== Results ===
Home \ Away	EFS	AXM	BRO	CZV	CSK	FCB	FBD	KHI	BKN	MTA	OLY	PAO	RMB	UNI	VBC	ZAL
Anadolu Efes	—	73–68	69–58	104–95	80–98	83–107	84–89	73–85	81–82	81–94	58–61	81–82	74–88	74–79	82–66	70–86
AX Armani Exchange Olimpia	77–64	—	71–62	88–91	81–107	78–74	86–92	71–77	92–85	102–111	85–86	95–96	77–88	101–87	89–93	62–94
Brose Bamberg	88–79	78–83	—	86–62	76–92	84–81	57–80	70–74	78–72	71–88	67–65	95–74	66–81	93–88	83–82	93–86
Crvena zvezda mts	100–81	100–89	69–75	—	59–85	90–82	63–80	70–79	81–85	87–84	89–78	63–69	79–82	80–76	106–90	77–65
CSKA Moscow	110–79	93–84	81–72	92–81	—	92–78	93–95	79–68	93–86	101–86	89–81	81–63	93–87	101–76	94–67	94–91
FC Barcelona Lassa	85–89	81–83	81–66	88–54	85–72	—	68–83	86–82	73–86	89–67	73–51	98–71	74–101	83–90	89–71	75–81
Fenerbahçe Doğuş	81–70	89–70	77–69	82–56	79–81	86–82	—	71–67	79–74	87–73	83–90	67–62	77–79	91–99	79–66	89–90
Khimki	86–68	77–86	82–73	85–78	73–90	65–79	64–73	—	91–90	69–77	82–54	78–61	78–95	68–66	75–70	85–77
Kirolbet Baskonia	79–81	82–83	103–79	103–84	81–90	85–82	69–83	87–77	—	83–72	86–54	85–84	105–75	88–82	63–80	84–64
Maccabi FOX Tel Aviv	72–92	79–68	90–88	89–75	73–93	94–82	82–73	91–94	74–68	—	68–69	75–76	90–83	78–89	94–91	81–74
Olympiacos	89–82	87–80	87–79	85–59	88–86	63–90	95–70	92–75	75–64	94–64	—	62–70	92–83	80–75	80–70	85–86
Panathinaikos Superfoods	90–79	80–72	93–83	91–71	70–75	84–75	70–68	93–65	80–76	89–76	85–87	—	82–80	82–71	75–56	94–93
Real Madrid	87–68	100–90	106–86	83–87	82–69	87–75	83–86	80–86	75–73	93–81	79–80	92–75	—	89–57	91–72	88–81
Unicaja	81–68	74–71	76–80	79–65	80–89	95–91	68–67	93–84	83–85	83–69	87–85	79–90	80–75	—	83–85	83–85
Valencia Basket	78–71	98–103	86–70	82–86	103–99	81–76	67–80	85–83	71–81	87–84	64–72	67–63	96–88	91–53	—	63–71
Žalgiris	91–83	77–65	88–84	78–76	85–73	90–74	78–85	74–84	77–97	99–84	74–68	80–74	66–87	79–77	86–82	—

Source: EuroLeague
Legend: Blue = home team win; Red = away team win.
Matches with lighter background shading were decided after overtime.

== Playoffs ==
Playoffs series are best-of-five. The first team to win three games wins the series. A 2–2–1 format is used – teams with home-court advantage play games 1, 2, and 5 at home, while their opponents host games 3 and 4. Games 4 and 5 are only played if necessary. The four victorious teams advance to the Final Four.

=== Series ===
Team 1	Series	Team 2	Game 1	Game 2	Game 3	Game 4	Game 5
CSKA Moscow (Russia)	3–1	(Russia) Khimki	98–95	89–84	73–79	89–88	
Panathinaikos Superfoods (Greece)	1–3	(Spain) Real Madrid	95–67	82–89	74–81	82–89	
Fenerbahçe Doğuş (Turkey)	3–1	(Spain) Kirolbet Baskonia	82–73	95–89	83–88	92–83	
Olympiacos (Greece)	1–3	(Lithuania) Žalgiris	78–87	79–68	60–80	91–101	

== Final Four ==
The Final Four, held over a single weekend, is the last phase of the season. The four remaining teams play a single knockout round on Friday evening, with the two winners advancing to the championship game. Sunday starts with the third-place game, followed by the championship game. The Final Four was played at the Štark Arena in Belgrade, Serbia in May 2018.

Semifinals
18 May
(Russia) CSKA Moscow	83
(Spain) Real Madrid	92
18 May
(Turkey) Fenerbahçe Doğuş	76
(Lithuania) Žalgiris	67

Championship game
20 May
(Spain) Real Madrid	85
(Turkey) Fenerbahçe Doğuş	80
Third place game
20 May
(Russia) CSKA Moscow	77
(Lithuania) Žalgiris	79

== Attendances ==
Attendances include playoff games:

Pos	Team	Total	High	Low	Average	Change
	2018 Final Four games	63,714	16,967	14,548	15,929	+7.5%
1	Žalgiris	230,518	15,525	10,195	13,560	+17.8%
2	Panathinaikos Superfoods	221,085	18,243	7,812	13,005	+13.0%
3	Fenerbahçe Doğuş	196,620	12,987	9,812	11,566	+3.1%
4	Baskonia	192,959	14,923	9,196	11,351	−2.4%
5	Maccabi FOX Tel Aviv	160,968	11,060	9,388	10,731	−1.4%
6	Real Madrid	170,516	12,557	8,067	10,030	−2.7%
7	Olympiacos	151,516	11,690	4,621	8,913	−4.8%^{2}
8	CSKA Moscow	139,579	12,322	4,490	8,211	−1.0%^{3}
9	AX Armani Exchange Olimpia	112,084	10,250	5,528	7,472	−21.2%^{5}
10	Unicaja	109,080	10,292	5,751	7,272	+12.7%^{1}
11	Valencia Basket	101,298	7,375	5,736	6,753	+15.6%^{1}
12	Crvena zvezda mts	94,151	13,467	4,472	6,277	−36.1%
13	Brose Bamberg	92,817	8,000	5,396	6,188	−3.5%^{4}
14	Khimki	102,367	7,028	5,113	6,022	+205.8%^{1}
15	FC Barcelona Lassa	85,185	6,829	4,002	5,679	+15.2%
16	Anadolu Efes	58,495	6,788	1,920	3,900	−26.7%
	League total	2,282,897	18,243	1,920	8,780	+3.6%

Source: EuroLeague
Notes:
1: 2016–17 season average applied to EuroCup games.
2: Olympiacos played one match at Heraklion Arena, in Heraklion, instead of their regular arena.
3: CSKA Moscow played three matches at Universal Sports Hall CSKA, instead of Megasport Arena.
4: Brose Bamberg played one match at Arena Nürnberger Versicherung, instead of Brose Arena.
5: AX Armani Exchange Olimpia played one match at PalaBancoDesio, instead of Mediolanum Forum.

== Awards ==
=== EuroLeague MVP ===
- (Slovenia) Luka Dončić ( (Spain) Real Madrid)

=== EuroLeague Final Four MVP ===
- (Slovenia) Luka Dončić ( (Spain) Real Madrid)

=== All-EuroLeague Teams ===
Pos.	First Team		Second Team	
G	(Greece) Nick Calathes	(Greece) Panathinaikos	(Greece) Vassilis Spanoulis	(Greece) Olympiacos
G	(France) Nando de Colo	(Russia) CSKA Moscow	(Canada) Kevin Pangos	(Lithuania) Žalgiris
F	(Slovenia) Luka Dončić	(Spain) Real Madrid	(Spain) Sergio Rodríguez	(Russia) CSKA Moscow
F	(Georgia (country)) Tornike Shengelia	(Spain) Kirolbet Baskonia	(Russia) Alexey Shved	(Russia) Khimki
C	(Czech Republic) Jan Veselý	(Turkey) Fenerbahçe	(Lithuania) Paulius Jankūnas	(Lithuania) Žalgiris

=== Alphonso Ford Top Scorer Trophy ===
- (Russia) Alexey Shved ( (Russia) Khimki)

=== Best Defender ===
- (United States) Kyle Hines ( (Russia) CSKA Moscow)

=== Rising Star ===
- (Slovenia) Luka Dončić ( (Spain) Real Madrid)

=== Coach of the Year ===
- (Spain) Pablo Laso ( (Spain) Real Madrid)

=== Magic Moment ===
- (Czech Republic) Jan Veselý ( (Turkey) Fenerbahçe)

=== MVP of the Round ===
Regular season

Round	Player	Team	PIR	Ref.
1	(United States) Pierre Jackson	(Israel) Maccabi FOX Tel Aviv	41	
2	(United States) Erick Green	(Spain) Valencia Basket	33	
3	(Slovenia) Luka Dončić	(Spain) Real Madrid	41	
4	(Slovenia) Luka Dončić (2)	(Spain) Real Madrid	35	
5	(France) Nando de Colo	(Russia) CSKA Moscow	37	
6	(Serbia) Vladimir Štimac	(Turkey) Anadolu Efes	29	
7	(United States) Errick McCollum	(Turkey) Anadolu Efes	33	
8	(Greece) Nick Calathes	(Greece) Panathinaikos Superfoods	42	
9	(Lithuania) Edgaras Ulanovas	(Lithuania) Žalgiris	32	
10	(France) Nando de Colo (2)	(Russia) CSKA Moscow	30	
10	(United States) James Gist	(Greece) Panathinaikos Superfoods	30	
11	(Russia) Alexey Shved	(Russia) Khimki	35	
12	(France) Vincent Poirier	(Spain) Kirolbet Baskonia	35	
13	(United States) Jamel McLean	(Greece) Olympiacos	30	
13	(Russia) Alexey Shved (2)	(Russia) Khimki	30	
14	(United States) Cory Higgins	(Russia) CSKA Moscow	31	
14	(Georgia (country)) Tornike Shengelia	(Spain) Kirolbet Baskonia	31	
15	(Slovenia) Luka Dončić (3)	(Spain) Real Madrid	37	
16	(United States) Malcolm Thomas	(Russia) Khimki	28	
17	(Slovenia) Zoran Dragić	(Turkey) Anadolu Efes	34	
18	(Russia) Alexey Shved (3)	(Russia) Khimki	33	
19	(United States) Brad Wanamaker	(Turkey) Fenerbahçe Doğuş	31	
20	(United States) Brad Wanamaker (2)	(Turkey) Fenerbahçe Doğuş	33	
21	(United States) Augustine Rubit	(Germany) Brose Bamberg	34	
22	(Czech Republic) Jan Veselý	(Turkey) Fenerbahçe Doğuş	36	
23	(Greece) Vassilis Spanoulis	(Greece) Olympiacos	29	
23	(United States) Dorell Wright	(Germany) Brose Bamberg	29	
24	(Georgia (country)) Tornike Shengelia (2)	(Spain) Kirolbet Baskonia	28	
25	(France) Fabien Causeur	(Spain) Real Madrid	29	
26	(Dominican Republic) James Feldeine	(Serbia) Crvena zvezda mts	32	
27	(Greece) Nick Calathes (2)	(Greece) Panathinaikos Superfoods	34	
28	(Georgia (country)) Ricky Hickman	(Germany) Brose Bamberg	29	
28	(Serbia) Nikola Milutinov	(Greece) Olympiacos	29	
29	(Slovenia) Luka Dončić (4)	(Spain) Real Madrid	35	
30	(Slovenia) Anthony Randolph	(Spain) Real Madrid	38	

Playoffs

Game	Player	Team	PIR	Ref.
1	(Greece) Nick Calathes (3)	(Greece) Panathinaikos Superfoods	29	
2	(Spain) Sergio Rodríguez	(Russia) CSKA Moscow	36	
3	(United States) Anthony Gill	(Russia) Khimki	29	
3	(Russia) Alexey Shved (4)	(Russia) Khimki	29	
4	(Lithuania) Edgaras Ulanovas (2)	(Lithuania) Žalgiris	27	

=== MVP of the Month ===
Month	Week	Player	Team	Ref.
2017
October	1–4	(Slovenia) Luka Dončić	(Spain) Real Madrid	
November	5–10	(Greece) Nick Calathes	(Greece) Panathinaikos Superfoods	
December	10–15	(Lithuania) Paulius Jankūnas	(Lithuania) Žalgiris	
2018
January	16–20	(France) Nando de Colo	(Russia) CSKA Moscow	
February	21–23	(Russia) Alexey Shved	(Russia) Khimki	
March	24–29	(Georgia (country)) Tornike Shengelia	(Spain) Kirolbet Baskonia	
April	30–PO4	(United States) Brandon Davies	(Lithuania) Žalgiris	

== Individual statistics ==
=== Rating ===
Rank	Name	Team	Games	Rating	PIR
1.	(Slovenia) Luka Dončić	(Spain) Real Madrid	33	711	21.55
2.	(Russia) Alexey Shved	(Russia) Khimki	34	693	20.38
3.	(France) Nando de Colo	(Russia) CSKA Moscow	32	606	18.94

=== Points ===
Rank	Name	Team	Games	Points	PPG
1.	(Russia) Alexey Shved	(Russia) Khimki	34	740	21.76
2.	(France) Nando de Colo	(Russia) CSKA Moscow	32	533	16.66
3.	(Slovenia) Luka Dončić	(Spain) Real Madrid	33	529	16

=== Rebounds ===
Rank	Name	Team	Games	Rebounds	RPG
1.	(United States) James Augustine	(Spain) Unicaja	29	194	6.69
2.	(Lithuania) Artūras Gudaitis	(Italy) AX Armani Exchange Olimpia	29	183	6.31
3.	(Georgia (country)) Tornike Shengelia	(Spain) Kirolbet Baskonia	33	200	6.06

=== Assists ===
Rank	Name	Team	Games	Assists	APG
1.	(Greece) Nick Calathes	(Greece) Panathinaikos Superfoods	31	249	8.03
2.	(France) Thomas Heurtel	(Spain) FC Barcelona Lassa	30	193	6.43
3.	(Canada) Kevin Pangos	(Lithuania) Žalgiris	36	212	5.89

=== Other statistics ===
Category	Player	Team	Games	Average
Steals	(Greece) Nick Calathes	(Greece) Panathinaikos Superfoods	31	1.74
Blocks	(Armenia) Bryant Dunston	(Turkey) Anadolu Efes	30	1.73
Turnovers	(Greece) Vassilis Spanoulis	(Greece) Olympiacos	24	3.46
Fouls drawn	(Russia) Alexey Shved	(Russia) Khimki	34	6.03
Minutes	(Russia) Alexey Shved	(Russia) Khimki	34	32:12
2P%	(Jordan) Ahmet Düverioğlu	(Turkey) Fenerbahçe Doğuş	27	70.9%
3P%	(Germany) Johannes Voigtmann	(Spain) Kirolbet Baskonia	34	57.7%
FT%	(Australia) Brock Motum	(Turkey) Anadolu Efes	29	96.7%

== See also ==
- 2017–18 EuroCup Basketball
- 2017–18 Basketball Champions League
- 2017–18 FIBA Europe Cup
