= Eric McClellan =

American basketball player (born 1993)

Free agent
- Position: Shooting guard

Personal information
- Born: April 6, 1993 (age 33) Austin, Texas, U.S.
- Listed height: 6 ft 5 in (1.96 m)
- Listed weight: 195.2 lb (89 kg)

Career information
- High school: Stephen F. Austin (Austin, Texas)
- College: Tulsa (2011–2012); Vanderbilt (2013–2014); Gonzaga (2014–2016)
- NBA draft: 2016: undrafted
- Playing career: 2016–present

Career history
- 2016: Limburg United
- 2016–2017: Tigers Tübingen
- 2017: Koroivos Amaliadas
- 2017–2018: Mineros de Zacatecas
- 2018: Pieno žvaigždės
- 2019–2021: Kapfenberg Bulls

Career highlights
- Austrian League champion (2019); 2x Austrian Cup winner (2019, 2020); WCC Defensive Player of the Year (2016)

Eric McClellan (born April 6, 1993) is an American professional basketball player who last played for Kapfenberg Bulls. A 6 foot 4 inch (1.93 meter) shooting guard, McClellan played college basketball for Tulsa, Vanderbilt and Gonzaga. McClellan entered the 2016 NBA draft but was not selected in the draft's two rounds.

== High school career ==
McClellan played high school basketball at Stephen F. Austin. As a junior at Stephen F. Austin, he led his team to a 29-4 record and the District 15-5A championship his senior season, where he averaged 18.9 points, 6.4 rebounds and 4.8 assists per game.

== College career ==
McClellan chose Tulsa to start his college career. As a freshman, he averaged 8.5 points and 2.5 rebounds in 21.3 minutes per game. After one year at Tulsa, he transferred to Vanderbilt, where he became the starting guard of the team during the 2013-14 season. As a sophomore at Vanderbilt, he averaged 14.2 points and 4.4 rebounds per game, and led the team in scoring. On January 10, 2014, McClellan was suspended for the rest of the season after violating academic policy and was dismissed from Vanderbilt.

The next season, he transferred to Gonzaga, where as a junior, he was a role player for Mark Few. As a senior, he gained more playing time after the departure of Kevin Pangos from the team. At the end of the season, he averaged 10.7 points, 2 assists and 3.2 rebounds in 26.9 minutes per game.

== Professional career ==
After going undrafted in the 2016 NBA draft, McClellan joined Limburg United of the Belgian League. After averaging 14.2 points and 3 rebounds per game in 5 league games, he left Limburg and joined Tigers Tübingen of the Basketball Bundesliga. On February 21, 2017, he left Tigers Tübingen and joined Koroivos Amaliadas of the Greek Basket League, replacing D'Vauntes Smith-Rivera on the team's squad.

On November 19, 2020, he joined Kapfenberg Bulls of the Austrian Basketball Bundesliga. With Bulls, he managed to win the Austrian League in 2019 and the Austrian Cup twice, in 2019 and 2020. On November 30, 2020, he terminated his contract with the club.
