= Dr. John M. Denison Secondary School =

Location
- 135 Bristol Road; Newmarket, Ontario, L3Y 8J7; Canada; 44°4′8″N 79°28′38″W

Information
- School type: High school
- Religious affiliation: Secular
- Founded: 1989
- School board: York Region District School Board
- Superintendent: Farooq Shabbar
- Area trustee: Carolyn Butterworth; Pamela McCarthy
- Principal: Seiji Ishiguro
- Grades: 9-12
- Enrolment: >1000 (February 2024)
- Language: English
- Area: Newmarket
- Colours: black, white and silver
- Mascot: Husky
- Team name: Huskies
- Website: www.yrdsb.ca/schools/denison.ss/Pages/default.aspx
- Last updated: February 2024

Dr. J.M. Denison S.S. is a public high school in the York Region District School Board located on 135 Bristol Road, Newmarket, Ontario, Canada. It opened in 1989, additions were built in 1991, and a new technological studies wing was completed in late 2009. The school is just south of the border between Newmarket and East Gwillimbury.

Dr. J.M. Denison S.S. is named after John Michael Denison (1933–2001), a family physician and former coroner for York Region. Denison was a doctor who was highly acclaimed in and around Newmarket.

== Feeder schools ==
- Denne Public School
- Maple Leaf Public School
- Holland Landing Public School
- Park Avenue Public School
- Alexander Muir Public School
- Phoebe Gilman Public School

The school also receives students from Canadian Martyrs Catholic School, due to its proximity.

== Extra-curricular activities ==
=== Athletics ===
Denison students take part in a variety of sports including volleyball, basketball, rugby, track and field, soccer, ice hockey, field hockey, and others. Inter-school sports are governed by the York Region Athletic Association. An optional outdoor education course that teaches survival skills is no longer offered.

=== Music ===
Denison students can also participate in several musical groups that Denison has to offer, including the award-winning Paramedics of Rhythm and the Shades of Gray. Students can show off their talent in the Wind Ensemble, Denison Singers and the Denison Music Council. The Music department also plans yearly trips to show the students places outside of Newmarket and Toronto, including a yearly trip to see a musical in Stratford, Ontario. The Denison Wind Ensemble travelled to Ottawa in May 2010 to compete in the national music contest, MusicFest Canada.

=== Student clubs ===
There are a variety of student clubs for students to participate in including the Eco-Ethical group, who work to raise awareness about environmental and social justice issues among their peers and the community. They host an annual Fairly Bazaar and Fashion4U show and a webpage on "everyday ideas to help make the world a better place".

The math club at Denison has generated some attention in recent years, with the offer of a variety of different math contests. The science club competes in the Science Olympics annually. Programmers are encouraged to partake in the biannual programming competition "Pyweek". In 2014, a team from Denison called "101 Factorial" placed third for the entertainment value of their game "Hyperturret Defense".

== Notable alumni ==
- Kevin Pangos, NBA basketball player with Cleveland Cavaliers
- Kurtis Gabriel, former NHL hockey player
- Sam Bennett, NHL hockey player with Florida Panthers

== See also ==
- Education in Ontario
- List of secondary schools in Ontario
