= Kevin Pangos =

Canadian basketball player (born 1993)

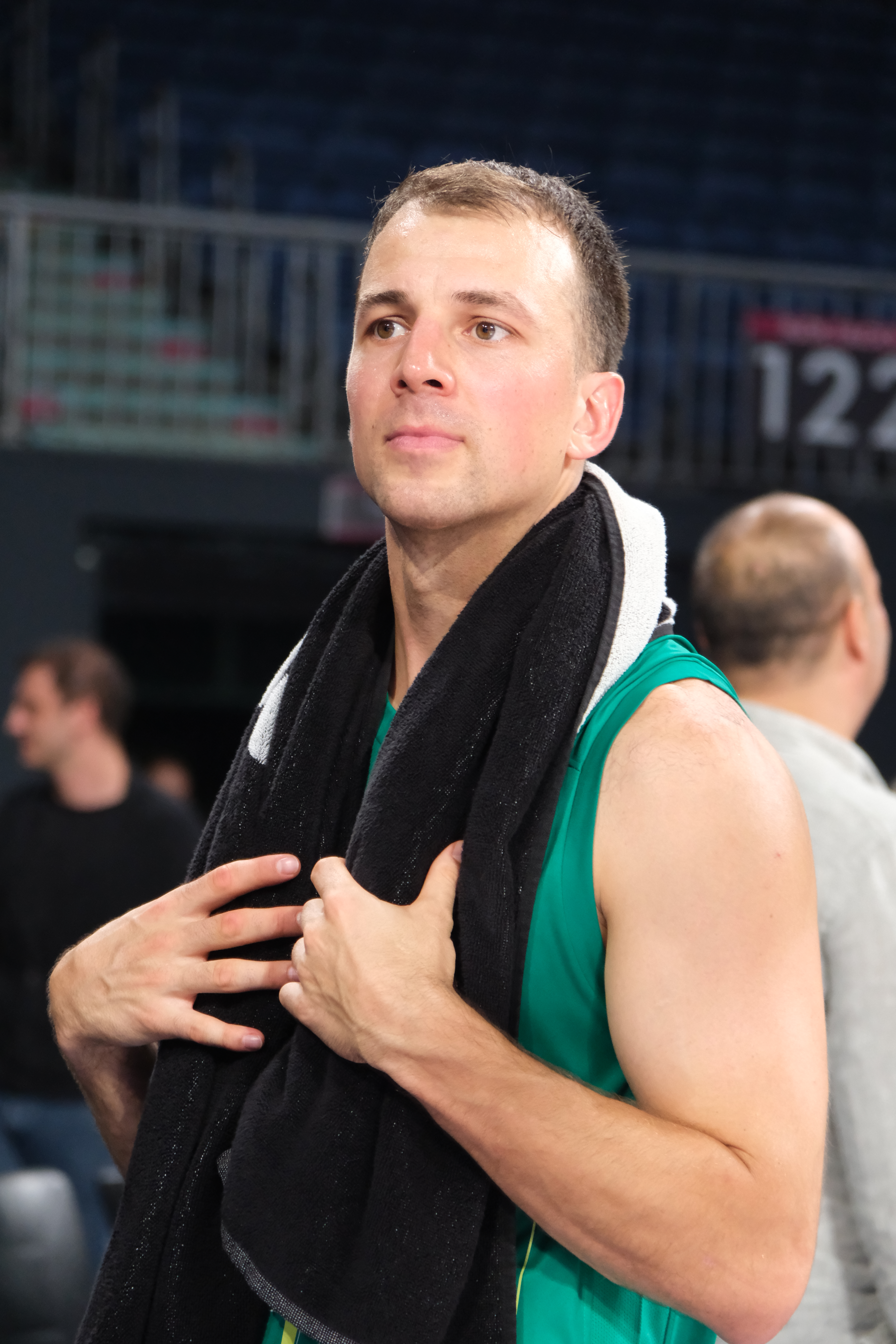
- Pangos with Esenler Erokspor in 2025

Arizona Wildcats
- Title: Assistant coach
- League: Big 12 Conference

Personal information
- Born: January 26, 1993 (age 33) Holland Landing, Ontario, Canada
- Listed height: 6 ft 1 in (1.85 m)
- Listed weight: 179 lb (81 kg)

Career information
- High school: Denison (Newmarket, Ontario)
- College: Gonzaga (2011–2015)
- NBA draft: 2015: undrafted
- Playing career: 2015–2026
- Position: Point guard
- Number: 4, 3, 5, 6, 47
- Coaching career: 2026–present

Career history

Playing
- 2015–2016: Gran Canaria
- 2016–2018: Žalgiris Kaunas
- 2018–2020: FC Barcelona
- 2020–2021: Zenit Saint Petersburg
- 2021–2022: Cleveland Cavaliers
- 2021–2022: →Cleveland Charge
- 2022–2023: Olimpia Milano
- 2023–2024: Valencia
- 2024–2025: Napoli
- 2025–2026: Esenler Erokspor

Coaching
- 2026–present: Arizona (assistant)

Career highlights
- All-EuroLeague First Team (2021); All-EuroLeague Second Team (2018); All-EuroCup Second Team (2016); LBA champion (2023); All-VTB United League Second Team (2021); Spanish Cup winner (2019); 2× Lithuanian League champion (2017, 2018); All-Lithuanian League Team (2018); Lithuanian League Foreign Player of the Year (2018); 2× King Mindaugas Cup winner (2017, 2018); Third-team All-American – AP, NABC, TSN (2015); WCC Player of the Year (2015); 4× First-team All-WCC (2012–2015); WCC Newcomer of the Year (2012)

Career NBA statistics
- Points: 39 (1.6 ppg)
- Rebounds: 11 (0.5 rpg)
- Assists: 30 (1.3 apg)
- Stats at NBA.com
- Stats at Basketball Reference
Medals
Men's basketball
Representing Canada
FIBA Americas U18 Championship
Bronze medal – third place	2012 São Sebastião do Paraíso	National team
FIBA World U17 Cup
Bronze medal – third place	2010 Hamburg	National team
FIBA Americas U16 Championship
Bronze medal – third place	2009 Mendoza	National team

Kevin Joseph Pangos (born January 26, 1993) is a Canadian-Slovenian basketball coach and former player who is currently an assistant coach for the Arizona Wildcats men's basketball team. He played college basketball for the Gonzaga Bulldogs. He was named the 2015 WCC Player of the Year, as well as a third-team All-American by Sporting News. Pangos has also represented Canada on the international stage.

== Early life ==
Pangos is a third-generation Slovene Canadian as his paternal grandparents emigrated to Canada from the former Yugoslav Republic. He has a Slovenian passport. Like many young Canadians, Pangos played minor hockey. He had family connections to the game—an uncle played in the NHL, and a cousin was drafted by the Washington Capitals—but he did not like the sport as much as basketball. In any event, he had much deeper family links to that sport. His father Bill played basketball for the University of Toronto and finished his 26th season as the head women's basketball coach at York University in Toronto in 2013, his mother Patty played Canadian Interuniversity Sport basketball at McMaster University, and his sister Kayla played under their father at York.

Growing up, Pangos' biggest inspiration was Steve Nash, a Canadian who developed into one of the NBA's top point guards and a two-time MVP. At training camps throughout his youth, Pangos paid special attention to stories about Nash; he recalled in a 2013 interview, "Someone would say, 'Steve Nash would make 500 shots a day.' I figured I had to make 500 shots a day."

Although he played for various national and provincial youth squads, he frequently trained alone or with his father, as he found relatively little high-level competition in Ontario.

== High school career ==
Pangos played for Dr. John M. Denison Secondary School in Newmarket, Ontario. In his grade 12 season, he led Denison to the OFSAA Triple-A title game where he scored a game-high 26 points in a 69–64 loss to Anderson CVI. He is highly respected for being one of the top players to come from a high school in the Regional Municipality of York.

College recruiting
Name	Hometown	School	Height	Weight	Commit date
Kevin Pangos; PG	Newmarket, ON	Dr. John M. Denison (ON)	6 ft 1 in (1.85 m)	175 lb (79 kg)	Nov 11, 2010
Kevin Pangos; PG	Recruit ratings: Scout: Rivals: (92)				
Overall recruit ranking:
Note: In many cases, Scout, Rivals, 247Sports, On3, and ESPN may conflict in their listings of height and weight.; In these cases, the average was taken. ESPN grades are on a 100-point scale.; Sources: "2011 Gonzaga". Rivals.; "2011 Basketball Recruiting Commits". Scout.; "Scout.com Team Recruiting Rankings". Scout.; "2011 Team Ranking". Rivals.

== College career ==
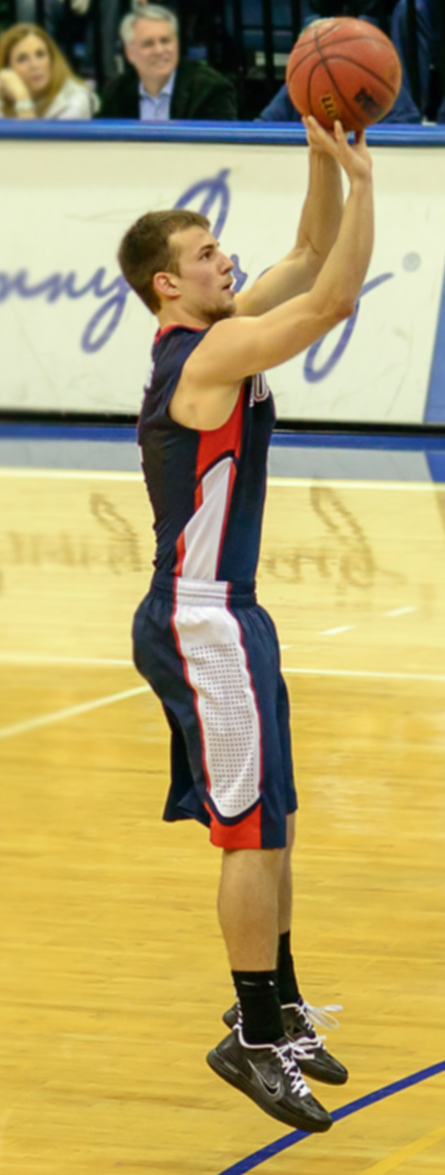
Pangos taking a jump shot for Gonzaga.

Pangos received offers from several NCAA Division I schools including Michigan, Temple, UNLV, Portland, and Cincinnati. Notably, he and Trey Burke were both offered scholarships to Michigan, but only on a first-come, first-served basis; Burke accepted first. Pangos opted for Gonzaga after receiving favorable reviews from Kelly Olynyk and his family; the Pangos and Olynyk families are longtime friends in the closely knit Canadian basketball community.

In his second NCAA game against Washington State he scored 33 points and tied a school record with nine three-pointers made in an 89–81 victory. This game kicked off a stellar 2011-12 freshman season at Gonzaga, as Pangos led the team in many statistical categories including points, assists, steals, minutes played, 3-pointers made, and free throw percentage. He helped Gonzaga to a 13–3 record in the West Coast Conference, good enough for second place, and a 26–7 overall record.

In the WCC semi-finals Pangos led Gonzaga by BYU in a 77–58 victory, scoring a game-high 30 points on 10–17 shooting. Pangos did not perform well in the 2012 West Coast Conference finals in a 78–74 overtime loss to Saint Mary's. Pangos shot just 3–18 from the field and 1–10 from three-point range.

Gonzaga entered the 2012 NCAA men's basketball tournament as a #7 seed. In his first NCAA tournament appearance, Pangos scored 13 points on 5–7 shooting and added 5 assists in a lop-sided 77–54 victory over West Virginia; however, Gonzaga would lose to #2-seeded Ohio State in the third round of the tournament 73–66. Pangos would score just 10 points on 3–13 shooting.

On January 29, 2015, against Portland, Pangos broke Blake Stepp's school record of 288 made 3-pointers. As of March 11, 2015, Pangos currently has a school-record of 313 3-pointers, which is good enough for fifth place all-time in West Coast Conference men's basketball.

== Professional career ==
=== Gran Canaria (2015–2016) ===
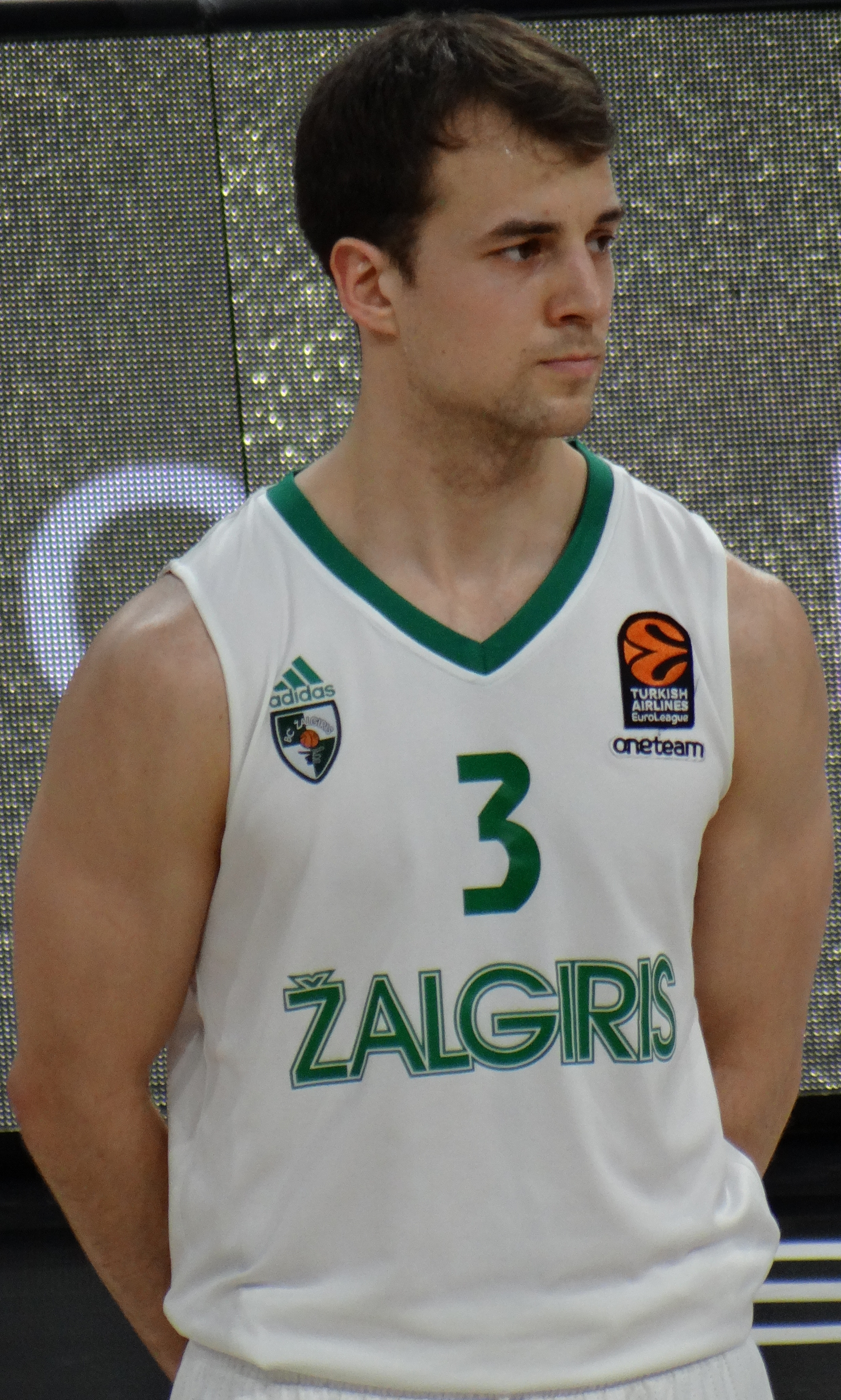
Pangos with Žalgiris Kaunas in 2018

On July 24, 2015, Pangos signed a two-year deal with the Spanish club Herbalife Gran Canaria.

=== Žalgiris (2016–2018) ===
In 2016, Pangos joined the Lithuanian club Žalgiris, with whom Pangos signed a "1+1" deal. In May 2018, he was named the All-EuroLeague Second Team for the 2017–18 season. With Žalgiris, he reached the 2018 EuroLeague Final Four, the team's first participation in 20 years. There, the team finished in third place after losing to Fenerbahçe and defeating CSKA Moscow.

=== Barcelona (2018–2020) ===
On July 25, 2018, Pangos signed a two-year deal with FC Barcelona Lassa of the Liga ACB and the EuroLeague. Due to an injury, he played three games during the 2019–20 season. Pangos parted ways with Barcelona on July 5, 2020.

=== Zenit Saint Petersburg (2020–2021) ===
On July 6, 2020, Pangos signed with Zenit Saint Petersburg of the VTB United League and the EuroLeague. He had an exceptionally productive season in Russia, making the All-EuroLeague First Team in the process and averaging 13.5 points and 6.6 assists per game. On July 23, 2021, Pangos officially parted ways with Zenit.

=== Cleveland Cavaliers (2021–2022) ===
On September 17, 2021, Pangos signed with the Cleveland Cavaliers. On February 19, 2022, he was waived.

On February 23, 2022, Pangos joined Russian club CSKA Moscow, signing a contract until the end of the 2023–2024 season. But he never appeared in a game with the team due to the 2022 Russian invasion of Ukraine.

=== Olimpia Milano (2022–2023) ===
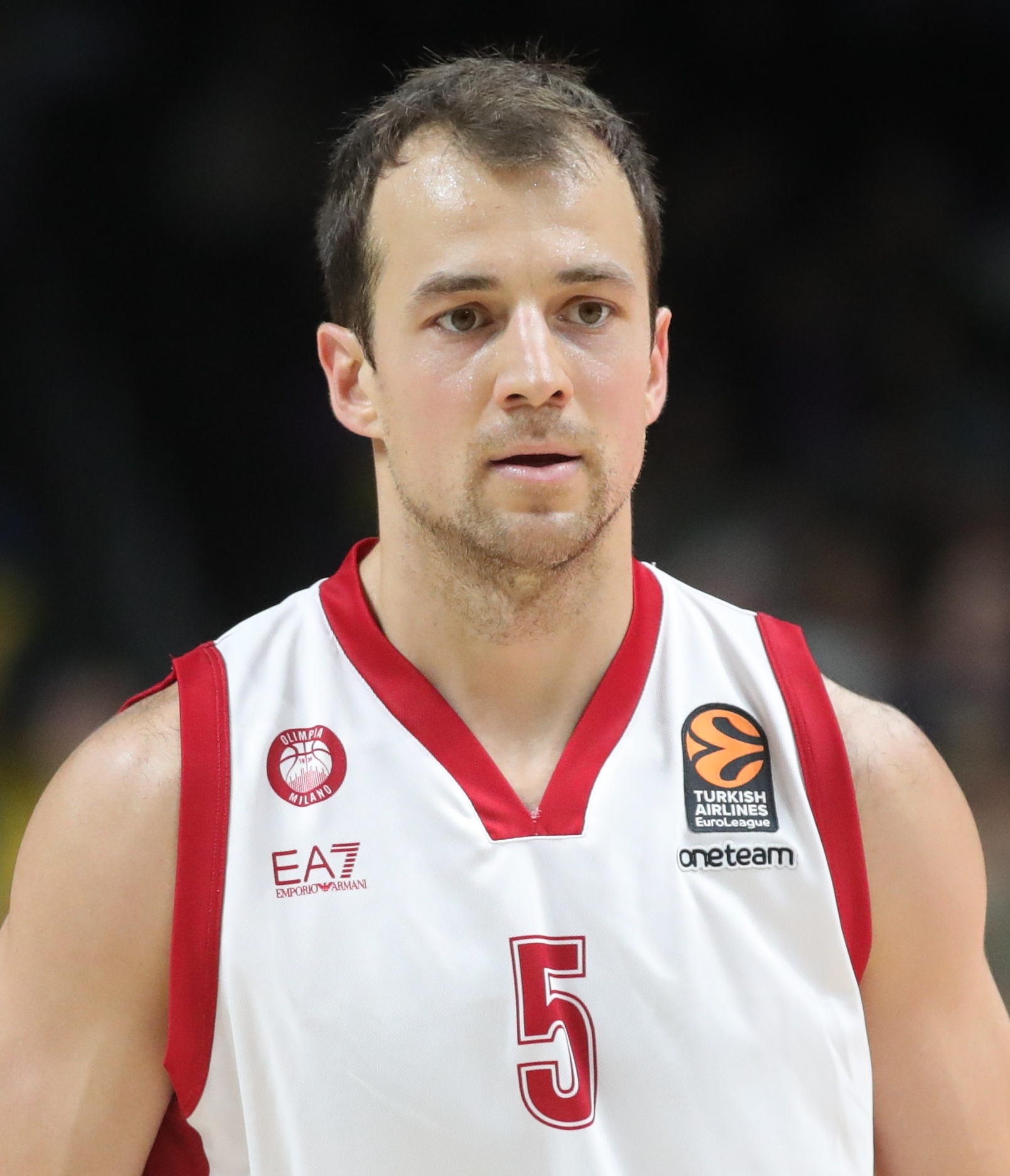
Pangos with Olimpia Milano in 2023

On July 27, 2022, Pangos signed a two-year contract with Olimpia Milano of the Lega Basket Serie A (LBA) and the EuroLeague. At the beginning of his second season with the Italian powerhouse, he fell out of favor with head coach and president of basketball operations Ettore Messina and continued training separated from the active roster.

=== Valencia (2023–2024) ===
On December 30, 2023, Pangos officially parted ways with Olimpia Milano and signed with Spanish club Valencia Basket for the rest of the season, with an option for an additional season. On June 14, 2024, Pangos was released by the Spanish club.

=== Napoli Basket (2024–2025) ===
On August 2, 2024, he signed with Napoli Basket of the Lega Basket Serie A (LBA).

=== Esenler Erokspor (2025–2026) ===
On October 14, 2025, he signed with Esenler Erokspor of the Basketbol Süper Ligi (BSL).

== National team career ==
Pangos played for the 2009 Canadian Cadet Men's National team that won bronze at the 2009 FIBA Americas Under-16 Championship, where he averaged 18.4 points, 5.4 rebounds, 3.8 assists, and 3.2 steals per game.

Pangos also represented Canada at the 2010 FIBA Under-17 World Championship, where he averaged 15.8 points, 5 rebounds, and 1.3 steals per game, en route to a bronze-medal game victory over Lithuania. He was named to the All-Tournament Team.

In 2011, Pangos travelled with Canada's Under-19 men's basketball team to Latvia, for the 2011 FIBA Under-19 World Championship. He finished second on the team in scoring, averaging 13.5 points per game, and led the team in assists, with 3.1 per game Pangos finished fourth among the tournament in steals per game leaders, averaging 2.1 per game.

On May 24, 2022, Pangos agreed to a three-year commitment to play with the Canadian senior men's national team.

== Coaching career ==
In October 2026 Pangos joined the coaching staff of the Arizona Wildcats men's basketball team under Tommy Lloyd, who was an assistant coach at Gonzaga during Pangos's time there.

== Career statistics ==
Legend
GP	Games played	GS	Games started	MPG	Minutes per game
FG%	Field-goal percentage	3P%	3-point field-goal percentage	FT%	Free-throw percentage
RPG	Rebounds per game	APG	Assists per game	SPG	Steals per game
BPG	Blocks per game	PPG	Points per game	PIR	Performance index rating
**Bold**	Career high

=== NBA ===
Year	Team	GP	GS	MPG	FG%	3P%	FT%	RPG	APG	SPG	BPG	PPG
2021–22	Cleveland	24	3	6.9	.326	.231	.750	.5	1.3	.1	.0	1.6
Career		24	3	6.9	.326	.231	.750	.5	1.3	.1	.0	1.6

=== EuroLeague ===
*	Led the league

Year	Team	GP	GS	MPG	FG%	3P%	FT%	RPG	APG	SPG	BPG	PPG	PIR
2016–17	Žalgiris	30	30	20.8	.381	.457	.862	1.8	3.2	**.9**	—	8.7	7.2
2017–18	Žalgiris	36*	36*	27.5	**.483**	**.475**	.754	**2.7**	5.9	.7	**.1**	12.7	14.2
2018–19	Barcelona	35	16	20.3	.386	.317	.741	1.1	3.2	.4	—	7.0	6.1
2020–21	Zenit	**39**	**39***	**29.0**	.449	.390	.845	2.1	**6.7**	.7	—	**13.5**	**14.8**
2022–23	Milano	16	11	25.0	.373	.303	.750	2.3	3.4	.6	—	8.9	7.7
2023–24	Milano	5	3	24.4	.371	.300	**1.000**	1.8	3.0	.4	—	7.2	6.0
2023–24	Valencia	12	4	13.5	.226	.200	**1.000**	.8	2.3	.3	—	1.9	1.9
Career		173	139	23.9	.422	.392	.802	1.9	4.5	.6	.0	9.8	9.8

=== Liga ACB ===
Season	Player	GP	GS	MPG	FG%	3FG%	FT%	RPG	APG	SPG	BPG	PPG	PIR
2015–16	Gran Canaria	30	24	23.0	.385	.373	.875	2.3	4.5	0.9	0.0	11.0	11.1
Career		30	24	23.0	.385	.373	.875	2.3	4.5	0.9	0.0	11.0	11.1

== Awards and achievements ==
- 2015 CBB 3-point Contest Champion
- 2012 WCC Newcomer of the Year
- 2012 First Team All-WCC
- 2012 WCC All-Freshman Team.
- 2013 First Team All-WCC
- 2014 First Team All-WCC
- 2015 First Team All-WCC
- 2015 WCC Player of the Year
- 2015 Sporting News Third Team All-American
